= United States men's Olympic water polo team statistics (scorers) =

This article contains lists of scorers for the United States men's national water polo team at the Summer Olympics, and is part of the United States men's Olympic water polo team statistics series. The lists are updated as of March 30, 2020.

== Abbreviations ==
No.	Cap number	Rk	Rank	Ref	Reference
H	Handedness	L	Left-handed	R	Right-handed
Pos	Playing position	FP	Field player	GK	Goalkeeper
CB	Center back (2-meter defense)	CF	Center forward (2-meter offense)	D	Driver (attacker)
U	Utility (except goalkeeper)	MP	Matches played	TMP	Total matches played
G	Goals	TG	Total goals	G/M	Goals per match

== Players with at least one goal at the Olympics ==
The following table is pre-sorted by number of total goals (in descending order), number of total matches played (in ascending order), edition of the Olympics (in ascending order), name of the player (in ascending order), respectively.

Tony Azevedo is the top scorer of all time for the United States men's Olympic water polo team, with 61 goals.

As a skilled left-hander, Chris Humbert is the American water polo player with the second most goals at the Olympic Games, scoring 37.

Players with at least one goals at the Olympics
Rk	Player	Games (goals)	TG	TMP	G/M	Pos	H	Height	Ref
1	Tony Azevedo	2000 (13), 2004 (15), 2008 (17) (silver) , 2012 (11), 2016 (5)	61	35	1.743	D	R	6 ft 1 in (1.85 m)	
2	Chris Humbert	1992 (7), 1996 (14), 2000 (16)	37	23	1.609	CF	L	6 ft 6.5 in (1.99 m)	
3	Bruce Bradley	1968 (18), 1972 (17) (bronze)	35	17	2.059	FP		6 ft 2 in (1.88 m)	
4	Wolf Wigo	1996 (8), 2000 (16), 2004 (7)	31	23	1.348	D		6 ft 1.5 in (1.87 m)	
5	Terry Schroeder	1984 (13) (silver) , 1988 (10) (silver) , 1992 (4)	27	21	1.286	CF		6 ft 2.5 in (1.89 m)	
6	Ryan Bailey	2000 (3), 2004 (2), 2008 (6) (silver) , 2012 (13)	24	30	0.800	CF	R	6 ft 5.5 in (1.97 m)	
7	Jody Campbell	1984 (10) (silver) , 1988 (12) (silver)	22	14	1.571	CF		6 ft 2.5 in (1.89 m)	
8	Mike Evans	1988 (10) (silver) , 1992 (7), 1996 (5)	22	21	1.048	D		6 ft 2 in (1.88 m)	
9	Kevin Robertson	1984 (13) (silver) , 1988 (8) (silver)	21	14	1.500	D	L	5 ft 8.5 in (1.74 m)	
10	Chris Oeding	1996 (11), 2000 (8)	19	16	1.188	D		6 ft 0.5 in (1.84 m)	
11	Phil Daubenspeck	1932 (14) (bronze) , 1936 (4)	18	7	2.571	FP			
12	Layne Beaubien	2004 (5), 2008 (8) (silver) , 2012 (4)	17	22	0.773	CB/U	R	6 ft 5.5 in (1.97 m)	
13	Peter Varellas	2008 (5) (silver) , 2012 (11)	16	15	1.067	D	L	6 ft 3 in (1.91 m)	
14	Jesse Smith	2004 (9), 2008 (3) (silver) , 2012 (3), 2016 (1)	16	27	0.593	CB/U	R	6 ft 4 in (1.93 m)	
15	Gary Sheerer	1968 (8), 1972 (7) (bronze)	15	17	0.882	FP		5 ft 8.5 in (1.74 m)	
16	Jeff Powers	2004 (4), 2008 (6) (silver) , 2012 (5)	15	22	0.682	CF/CB/U	R	6 ft 7 in (2.01 m)	
17	Peter Campbell	1984 (4) (silver) , 1988 (9) (silver)	13	14	0.929	CF/U		6 ft 3.5 in (1.92 m)	
18	Fred Tisue	1960 (12)	12	7	1.714	FP		5 ft 8.5 in (1.74 m)	
19	Russ Webb	1968 (6), 1972 (5) (bronze)	11	17	0.647	CB		6 ft 2 in (1.88 m)	
20	Stan Cole	1964 (2), 1968 (3), 1972 (6) (bronze)	11	20	0.550	CF/D	R	6 ft 1 in (1.85 m)	
21	Gavin Arroyo	1996 (6), 2000 (4)	10	16	0.625	CB		6 ft 2.5 in (1.89 m)	
22	Adam Wright	2004 (1), 2008 (4) (silver) , 2012 (5)	10	22	0.455	D	R	6 ft 3 in (1.91 m)	
23	James Bergeson	1988 (9) (silver)	9	7	1.286	D		6 ft 0 in (1.83 m)	
24	Jim Ferguson	1972 (9) (bronze)	9	9	1.000	D		6 ft 2 in (1.88 m)	
25	Ron Crawford	1960 (5), 1964 (4), 1968 (0)	9	17	0.529	D/CF	R	5 ft 10.5 in (1.79 m)	
25	Barry Weitzenberg	1968 (8), 1972 (1) (bronze)	9	17	0.529	FP		6 ft 1 in (1.85 m)	
27	Budd Goodwin	1904 (8) (gold)	8	2	4.000	FP			
28	Bret Bonanni	2016 (8)	8	5	1.600	D	R	6 ft 4 in (1.93 m)	
29	Gary Figueroa	1984 (8) (silver)	8	7	1.143	D		6 ft 0 in (1.83 m)	
30	Wally O'Connor	1924 (1) (bronze) , 1928 (3), 1932 (2) (bronze) , 1936 (2)	8	10	0.800	FP			
31	Bill Kooistra	1952 (7), 1956 (1)	8	12	0.667	FP		5 ft 10.5 in (1.79 m)	
32	Josh Samuels	2016 (7)	7	5	1.400	D	R	6 ft 4 in (1.93 m)	
33	Erich Fischer	1992 (7)	7	7	1.000	CB/U		6 ft 2.5 in (1.89 m)	
34	Jeremy Laster	1996 (7)	7	8	0.875	D	L	6 ft 4.5 in (1.94 m)	
35	Craig Klass	1988 (2) (silver) , 1992 (5)	7	13	0.538	CF	L	6 ft 4.5 in (1.94 m)	
36	Doug Kimbell	1988 (2) (silver) , 1992 (5)	7	14	0.500	CB		6 ft 8.5 in (2.04 m)	
37	Alex Rousseau	1992 (5), 1996 (2)	7	15	0.467	CF	L	6 ft 4.5 in (1.94 m)	
38	Kyle Kopp	1996 (4), 2000 (3)	7	16	0.438	CF		6 ft 6.5 in (1.99 m)	
39	Herbert Topp	1928 (6)	6	3	2.000	FP			
40	Rick McNair	1996 (6)	6	8	0.750	CB		6 ft 4.5 in (1.94 m)	
41	Bob Hughes	1952 (6), 1956 (0)	6	14	0.429	CF		6 ft 6 in (1.98 m)	
42	Tim Hutten	2008 (3) (silver) , 2012 (3)	6	15	0.400	CB	R	6 ft 5 in (1.96 m)	
43	Joe Vargas	1984 (5) (silver)	5	7	0.714	D		6 ft 2.5 in (1.89 m)	
44	Peter Asch	1972 (5) (bronze)	5	9	0.556	FP		6 ft 2 in (1.88 m)	
45	Wally Wolf	1956 (0), 1960 (5)	5	12	0.417	FP		5 ft 10.5 in (1.79 m)	
46	John Mann	2012 (3), 2016 (2)	5	13	0.385	CF	R	6 ft 6 in (1.98 m)	
47	Austin Clapp	1932 (4) (bronze)	4	4	1.000	FP			
47	Ron Volmer	1960 (4)	4	4	1.000	FP		6 ft 0 in (1.83 m)	
47	Alex Bowen	2016 (4)	4	4	1.000	D	R	6 ft 5 in (1.96 m)	
50	Jack Spargo	1952 (4)	4	5	0.800	D		5 ft 9 in (1.75 m)	
50	Luca Cupido	2016 (4)	4	5	0.800	D	R	6 ft 4 in (1.93 m)	
52	Drew McDonald	1984 (4) (silver)	4	7	0.571	CB		6 ft 4.5 in (1.94 m)	
52	Greg Boyer	1988 (4) (silver)	4	7	0.571	CF		6 ft 2.5 in (1.89 m)	
52	Alan Mouchawar	1988 (4) (silver)	4	7	0.571	U		6 ft 0.5 in (1.84 m)	
52	Charlie Harris	1992 (4)	4	7	0.571	CF		6 ft 4.5 in (1.94 m)	
56	Ronald Severa	1956 (0), 1960 (4)	4	10	0.400	FP		5 ft 10.5 in (1.79 m)	
57	Dave Ashleigh	1964 (2), 1968 (2)	4	11	0.364	FP	R	6 ft 0 in (1.83 m)	
58	Kirk Everist	1992 (2), 1996 (2)	4	15	0.267	D		6 ft 2.5 in (1.89 m)	
59	John Norton	1924 (3) (bronze)	3	3	1.000	FP			
59	Dan Drown	1964 (3)	3	3	1.000	FP	R	6 ft 2 in (1.88 m)	
61	Chuck Bittick	1960 (3)	3	5	0.600	FP		6 ft 2 in (1.88 m)	
62	Doug Burke	1984 (3) (silver)	3	7	0.429	D		6 ft 0 in (1.83 m)	
62	John Siman	1984 (3) (silver)	3	7	0.429	CB		6 ft 5.5 in (1.97 m)	
64	Herb Vollmer	1920 (0), 1924 (3) (bronze)	3	8	0.375	FP		6 ft 0 in (1.83 m)	
64	Sean Kern	2000 (3)	3	8	0.375	CF/CB		6 ft 4.5 in (1.94 m)	
64	Robert Lynn	2000 (3)	3	8	0.375	CB/U		6 ft 1.5 in (1.87 m)	
67	Jeff Campbell	1988 (1) (silver) , 1992 (2)	3	14	0.214	CB		6 ft 3.5 in (1.92 m)	
68	David Hesser	1904 (2) (gold)	2	2	1.000	FP			
69	Art Austin	1924 (2) (bronze)	2	5	0.400	FP			
69	Alex Obert	2016 (2)	2	5	0.400	CF/CB	R	6 ft 6 in (1.98 m)	
71	J. W. Krumpholz	2008 (2) (silver)	2	7	0.286	CF	R	6 ft 3 in (1.91 m)	
71	Rick Merlo	2008 (2) (silver)	2	7	0.286	U	R	6 ft 3 in (1.91 m)	
73	George Schroth	1924 (1) (bronze) , 1928 (1)	2	8	0.250	FP		6 ft 4 in (1.93 m)	
73	Dean Willeford	1968 (2)	2	8	0.250	FP		5 ft 10.5 in (1.79 m)	
73	Troy Barnhart, Jr.	1996 (2)	2	8	0.250	CF		6 ft 3.5 in (1.92 m)	
73	Shea Buckner	2012 (2)	2	8	0.250	D	R	6 ft 5 in (1.96 m)	
77	Peter Hudnut	2008 (1) (silver) , 2012 (1)	2	15	0.133	CB	R	6 ft 5 in (1.96 m)	
78	John Parker	1968 (2), 1972 (0) (bronze)	2	17	0.118	FP		6 ft 2 in (1.88 m)	
79	Louis Handley	1904 (1) (gold)	1	2	0.500	FP			
79	Ray Ruddy	1936 (1)	1	2	0.500	FP			
79	Edwin Knox	1948 (1)	1	2	0.500	FP			
82	James Carson	1920 (1)	1	3	0.333	FP			
82	Harry Hebner	1920 (1)	1	3	0.333	FP		5 ft 10.5 in (1.79 m)	
82	Sam Greller	1928 (1)	1	3	0.333	FP			
82	Bob Bray	1948 (1)	1	3	0.333	CF			
82	Lee Case	1948 (1)	1	3	0.333	FP			
82	Chris Christensen	1948 (1)	1	3	0.333	FP			
82	Bob Saari	1964 (1)	1	3	0.333	FP	R	6 ft 2 in (1.88 m)	
89	Sam Kooistra	1956 (1)	1	4	0.250	FP		6 ft 0.5 in (1.84 m)	
89	Alex Roelse	2016 (1)	1	4	0.250	CB	R	6 ft 7 in (2.01 m)	
91	Thomas Dunstan	2016 (1)	1	5	0.200	D	L	6 ft 4 in (1.93 m)	
92	Bill Dornblaser	1952 (1)	1	7	0.143	FP			
92	Tim Shaw	1984 (1) (silver)	1	7	0.143	D		6 ft 2 in (1.88 m)	
92	Jon Svendsen	1984 (1) (silver)	1	7	0.143	CB		6 ft 2.5 in (1.89 m)	
92	Omar Amr	2004 (1)	1	7	0.143	D		5 ft 10.5 in (1.79 m)	
92	Dan Klatt	2004 (1)	1	7	0.143	CB		6 ft 4.5 in (1.94 m)	
92	Brett Ormsby	2004 (1)	1	7	0.143	D		6 ft 2.5 in (1.89 m)	
92	Chris Segesman	2004 (1)	1	7	0.143	CB		6 ft 3.5 in (1.92 m)	
99	Marvin Burns	1952 (1), 1960 (0)	1	10	0.100	FP		6 ft 3.5 in (1.92 m)	
Rk	Player	Games (goals)	TG	TMP	G/M	Pos	H	Height	Ref

=== Historical progression – total goals at the Olympics ===
The following table shows the historical progression of the record of total goals at the Olympic Games.

TG	Achievement	Games	No.	Player	Pos	H	Height	Date	Age	Duration of record	Ref
8	Set record	1904 (gold)		Budd Goodwin	FP			Sep 6, 1904	20	27 years, 340 days	
14	Broke record	1932 (bronze)		Phil Daubenspeck	FP			Aug 11, 1932	26	3 years, 365 days	
18	Broke record	1936		Phil Daubenspeck	FP			Aug 10, 1936	30	36 years, 25 days	
18	Tied record	1968	6	Bruce Bradley	FP		6 ft 2 in (1.88 m)	Oct 25, 1968	21	36 years, 25 days	
35	Broke record	1972 (bronze)	6	Bruce Bradley	FP		6 ft 2 in (1.88 m)	Sep 4, 1972	25	28 years, 27 days	
37	Broke record	2000	10	Chris Humbert	CF	L	6 ft 6.5 in (1.99 m)	Oct 1, 2000	30	7 years, 328 days	
45	Broke record	2008 (silver)	8	Tony Azevedo	D	R	6 ft 1 in (1.85 m)	Aug 24, 2008	26	3 years, 354 days	
56	Broke record	2012	8	Tony Azevedo	D	R	6 ft 1 in (1.85 m)	Aug 12, 2012	30	4 years, 2 days	
61	Broke record	2016	8	Tony Azevedo	D	R	6 ft 1 in (1.85 m)	Aug 14, 2016	34	8 years, 204 days	

== Players with at least one goal in an Olympic tournament ==
The following table is pre-sorted by number of goals (in descending order), number of matches played (in ascending order), edition of the Olympics (in ascending order), Cap number or name of the player (in ascending order), respectively.

Bruce Bradley is the American male player with the most goals in an Olympic tournament, scoring 18.

Players with at least one goal in an Olympic tournament
Rk	Player	Games	No.	G	MP	G/M	Pos	H	Height	Age	Ref
1	Bruce Bradley	1968	6	18	8	2.250	FP		6 ft 2 in (1.88 m)	21	
2	Tony Azevedo	2008 (silver)	8	17	7	2.429	D	R	6 ft 1 in (1.85 m)	26	
3	Bruce Bradley	1972 (bronze)	6	17	9	1.889	FP		6 ft 2 in (1.88 m)	25	
4	Wolf Wigo	2000	9	16	8	2.000	D		6 ft 1.5 in (1.87 m)	27	
4	Chris Humbert	2000	10	16	8	2.000	CF	L	6 ft 6.5 in (1.99 m)	30	
6	Tony Azevedo	2004	8	15	7	2.143	D	R	6 ft 1 in (1.85 m)	22	
7	Phil Daubenspeck	1932 (bronze)		14	4	3.500	FP			26	
8	Chris Humbert	1996	10	14	8	1.750	CF	L	6 ft 6.5 in (1.99 m)	26	
9	Kevin Robertson	1984 (silver)	2	13	7	1.857	D	L	5 ft 8.5 in (1.74 m)	25	
9	Terry Schroeder	1984 (silver)	10	13	7	1.857	CF		6 ft 2.5 in (1.89 m)	25	
11	Tony Azevedo	2000	8	13	8	1.625	D	R	6 ft 1 in (1.85 m)	18	
11	Ryan Bailey	2012	9	13	8	1.625	CF	R	6 ft 5.5 in (1.97 m)	36	
13	Fred Tisue	1960		12	7	1.714	FP		5 ft 8.5 in (1.74 m)	21	
13	Jody Campbell	1988 (silver)	11	12	7	1.714	CF		6 ft 2.5 in (1.89 m)	28	
15	Chris Oeding	1996	5	11	8	1.375	D		6 ft 0.5 in (1.84 m)	24	
15	Peter Varellas	2012	2	11	8	1.375	D	L	6 ft 3 in (1.91 m)	27	
15	Tony Azevedo	2012	8	11	8	1.375	D	R	6 ft 1 in (1.85 m)	30	
18	Jody Campbell	1984 (silver)	11	10	7	1.429	CF		6 ft 2.5 in (1.89 m)	24	
18	Terry Schroeder	1988 (silver)	10	10	7	1.429	CF		6 ft 2.5 in (1.89 m)	29	
18	Mike Evans	1988 (silver)	13	10	7	1.429	D		6 ft 2 in (1.88 m)	28	
21	James Bergeson	1988 (silver)	3	9	7	1.286	D		6 ft 0 in (1.83 m)	27	
21	Peter Campbell	1988 (silver)	4	9	7	1.286	CF/U		6 ft 3.5 in (1.92 m)	28	
21	Jesse Smith	2004	11	9	7	1.286	U	R	6 ft 4 in (1.93 m)	21	
24	Jim Ferguson	1972 (bronze)	8	9	9	1.000	D		6 ft 2 in (1.88 m)	23	
25	Budd Goodwin	1904 (gold)		8	2	4.000	FP			20	
26	Bret Bonanni	2016	10	8	5	1.600	D	R	6 ft 4 in (1.93 m)	22	
27	Gary Figueroa	1984 (silver)	3	8	7	1.143	D		6 ft 0 in (1.83 m)	27	
27	Kevin Robertson	1988 (silver)	2	8	7	1.143	D	L	5 ft 8.5 in (1.74 m)	29	
27	Layne Beaubien	2008 (silver)	7	8	7	1.143	U	R	6 ft 5.5 in (1.97 m)	32	
30	Barry Weitzenberg	1968	8	8	8	1.000	FP		6 ft 1 in (1.85 m)	22	
30	Gary Sheerer	1968	9	8	8	1.000	FP		5 ft 8.5 in (1.74 m)	21	
30	Wolf Wigo	1996	13	8	8	1.000	D		6 ft 1.5 in (1.87 m)	23	
30	Chris Oeding	2000	5	8	8	1.000	D		6 ft 0.5 in (1.84 m)	29	
34	Josh Samuels	2016	7	7	5	1.400	D	R	6 ft 4 in (1.93 m)	25	
35	Mike Evans	1992	4	7	6	1.167	D		6 ft 2 in (1.88 m)	32	
36	Bill Kooistra	1952		7	7	1.000	FP		5 ft 10.5 in (1.79 m)	25	
36	Chris Humbert	1992	9	7	7	1.000	CF	L	6 ft 6.5 in (1.99 m)	22	
36	Erich Fischer	1992	12	7	7	1.000	CB/U		6 ft 2.5 in (1.89 m)	26	
36	Wolf Wigo	2004	2	7	7	1.000	D		6 ft 1.5 in (1.87 m)	31	
40	Jeremy Laster	1996	3	7	8	0.875	D	L	6 ft 4.5 in (1.94 m)	22	
41	Gary Sheerer	1972 (bronze)	5	7	9	0.778	FP		5 ft 8.5 in (1.74 m)	25	
42	Herbert Topp	1928		6	3	2.000	FP			28	
43	Jeff Powers	2008 (silver)	4	6	7	0.857	U	R	6 ft 7 in (2.01 m)	28	
43	Ryan Bailey	2008 (silver)	9	6	7	0.857	CF	R	6 ft 5.5 in (1.97 m)	32	
45	Russ Webb	1968	3	6	8	0.750	CB		6 ft 2 in (1.88 m)	23	
45	Gavin Arroyo	1996	6	6	8	0.750	CB		6 ft 2.5 in (1.89 m)	24	
45	Rick McNair	1996	8	6	8	0.750	CB		6 ft 4.5 in (1.94 m)	24	
48	Bob Hughes	1952		6	9	0.667	CF		6 ft 6 in (1.98 m)	21	
48	Stan Cole	1972 (bronze)	2	6	9	0.667	CF/D	R	6 ft 1 in (1.85 m)	26	
50	Tony Azevedo	2016	8	5	5	1.000	D	R	6 ft 1 in (1.85 m)	34	
51	Ron Crawford	1960		5	6	0.833	D/CF	R	5 ft 10.5 in (1.79 m)	20	
51	Craig Klass	1992	11	5	6	0.833	CF	L	6 ft 4.5 in (1.94 m)	27	
53	Wally Wolf	1960		5	7	0.714	FP		5 ft 10.5 in (1.79 m)	29	
53	Joe Vargas	1984 (silver)	6	5	7	0.714	D		6 ft 2.5 in (1.89 m)	28	
53	Doug Kimbell	1992	5	5	7	0.714	CB		6 ft 8.5 in (2.04 m)	32	
53	Alex Rousseau	1992	13	5	7	0.714	CF	L	6 ft 4.5 in (1.94 m)	24	
53	Layne Beaubien	2004	7	5	7	0.714	CB	R	6 ft 5.5 in (1.97 m)	28	
53	Peter Varellas	2008 (silver)	2	5	7	0.714	D	L	6 ft 3 in (1.91 m)	23	
59	Mike Evans	1996	11	5	8	0.625	D		6 ft 2 in (1.88 m)	36	
59	Jeff Powers	2012	4	5	8	0.625	CB	R	6 ft 7 in (2.01 m)	32	
59	Adam Wright	2012	5	5	8	0.625	D	R	6 ft 3 in (1.91 m)	35	
62	Russ Webb	1972 (bronze)	3	5	9	0.556	CB		6 ft 2 in (1.88 m)	27	
62	Peter Asch	1972 (bronze)	7	5	9	0.556	FP		6 ft 2 in (1.88 m)	23	
64	Phil Daubenspeck	1936		4	3	1.333	FP			30	
64	Ron Crawford	1964	2	4	3	1.333	D/CF	R	5 ft 10.5 in (1.79 m)	24	
66	Austin Clapp	1932 (bronze)		4	4	1.000	FP			21	
66	Ron Volmer	1960		4	4	1.000	FP		6 ft 0 in (1.83 m)	24	
66	Alex Bowen	2016	9	4	4	1.000	D	R	6 ft 5 in (1.96 m)	22	
69	Jack Spargo	1952		4	5	0.800	D		5 ft 9 in (1.75 m)	21	
69	Luca Cupido	2016	6	4	5	0.800	D	R	6 ft 4 in (1.93 m)	20	
71	Ronald Severa	1960		4	7	0.571	FP		5 ft 10.5 in (1.79 m)	24	
71	Peter Campbell	1984 (silver)	4	4	7	0.571	CF		6 ft 3.5 in (1.92 m)	24	
71	Drew McDonald	1984 (silver)	9	4	7	0.571	CB		6 ft 4.5 in (1.94 m)	28	
71	Alan Mouchawar	1988 (silver)	7	4	7	0.571	U		6 ft 0.5 in (1.84 m)	28	
71	Greg Boyer	1988 (silver)	9	4	7	0.571	CF		6 ft 2.5 in (1.89 m)	30	
71	Charlie Harris	1992	6	4	7	0.571	CF		6 ft 4.5 in (1.94 m)	28	
71	Terry Schroeder	1992	10	4	7	0.571	CF		6 ft 2.5 in (1.89 m)	33	
71	Jeff Powers	2004	4	4	7	0.571	CF	R	6 ft 7 in (2.01 m)	24	
71	Adam Wright	2008 (silver)	5	4	7	0.571	D	R	6 ft 3 in (1.91 m)	31	
80	Kyle Kopp	1996	4	4	8	0.500	CF		6 ft 6.5 in (1.99 m)	29	
80	Gavin Arroyo	2000	6	4	8	0.500	CB		6 ft 2.5 in (1.89 m)	28	
80	Layne Beaubien	2012	7	4	8	0.500	U	R	6 ft 5.5 in (1.97 m)	36	
83	Wally O'Connor	1928		3	2	1.500	FP			24	
84	John Norton	1924 (bronze)		3	3	1.000	FP			24	
84	Dan Drown	1964	8	3	3	1.000	FP	R	6 ft 2 in (1.88 m)	21	
86	Herb Vollmer	1924 (bronze)		3	5	0.600	FP		6 ft 0 in (1.83 m)	29	
86	Chuck Bittick	1960		3	5	0.600	FP		6 ft 2 in (1.88 m)	20	
88	Doug Burke	1984 (silver)	5	3	7	0.429	D		6 ft 0 in (1.83 m)	27	
88	John Siman	1984 (silver)	8	3	7	0.429	CB		6 ft 5.5 in (1.97 m)	31	
88	Tim Hutten	2008 (silver)	10	3	7	0.429	CB	R	6 ft 5 in (1.96 m)	23	
88	Jesse Smith	2008 (silver)	11	3	7	0.429	CB	R	6 ft 4 in (1.93 m)	25	
92	Stan Cole	1968	5	3	8	0.375	CF/D	R	6 ft 1 in (1.85 m)	23	
92	Robert Lynn	2000	3	3	8	0.375	CB/U		6 ft 1.5 in (1.87 m)	33	
92	Kyle Kopp	2000	4	3	8	0.375	CF		6 ft 6.5 in (1.99 m)	33	
92	Sean Kern	2000	11	3	8	0.375	CF/CB		6 ft 4.5 in (1.94 m)	22	
92	Ryan Bailey	2000	13	3	8	0.375	CF	R	6 ft 5.5 in (1.97 m)	25	
92	Tim Hutten	2012	10	3	8	0.375	CB	R	6 ft 5 in (1.96 m)	27	
92	Jesse Smith	2012	11	3	8	0.375	CB	R	6 ft 4 in (1.93 m)	29	
92	John Mann	2012	12	3	8	0.375	CF	R	6 ft 6 in (1.98 m)	27	
100	David Hesser	1904 (gold)		2	2	1.000	FP				
101	Wally O'Connor	1936		2	3	0.667	FP			32	
101	Dave Ashleigh	1964	3	2	3	0.667	FP	R	6 ft 0 in (1.83 m)	21	
101	Stan Cole	1964	6	2	3	0.667	CF/D	R	6 ft 1 in (1.85 m)	19	
104	Wally O'Connor	1932 (bronze)		2	4	0.500	FP			28	
105	Art Austin	1924 (bronze)		2	5	0.400	FP			22	
105	Alex Obert	2016	4	2	5	0.400	CF/CB	R	6 ft 6 in (1.98 m)	24	
105	John Mann	2016	12	2	5	0.400	CF	R	6 ft 6 in (1.98 m)	31	
108	Doug Kimbell	1988 (silver)	5	2	7	0.286	CB		6 ft 8.5 in (2.04 m)	28	
108	Craig Klass	1988 (silver)	6	2	7	0.286	CF	L	6 ft 4.5 in (1.94 m)	23	
108	Kirk Everist	1992	7	2	7	0.286	D		6 ft 2.5 in (1.89 m)	25	
108	Jeff Campbell	1992	8	2	7	0.286	CB		6 ft 3.5 in (1.92 m)	29	
108	Ryan Bailey	2004	13	2	7	0.286	CF	R	6 ft 5.5 in (1.97 m)	29	
108	Rick Merlo	2008 (silver)	6	2	7	0.286	U	R	6 ft 3 in (1.91 m)	26	
108	J. W. Krumpholz	2008 (silver)	12	2	7	0.286	CF	R	6 ft 3 in (1.91 m)	20	
115	Dave Ashleigh	1968	2	2	8	0.250	FP	R	6 ft 0 in (1.83 m)	25	
115	Dean Willeford	1968	7	2	8	0.250	FP		5 ft 10.5 in (1.79 m)	24	
115	John Parker	1968	10	2	8	0.250	FP		6 ft 2 in (1.88 m)	22	
115	Alex Rousseau	1996	7	2	8	0.250	CF	L	6 ft 4.5 in (1.94 m)	28	
115	Kirk Everist	1996	9	2	8	0.250	D		6 ft 2.5 in (1.89 m)	29	
115	Troy Barnhart, Jr.	1996	12	2	8	0.250	CF		6 ft 3.5 in (1.92 m)	25	
115	Shea Buckner	2012	6	2	8	0.250	D	R	6 ft 5 in (1.96 m)	25	
122	Wally O'Connor	1924 (bronze)		1	1	1.000	FP			20	
123	Louis Handley	1904 (gold)		1	2	0.500	FP			30	
123	Ray Ruddy	1936		1	2	0.500	FP			24	
123	Edwin Knox	1948		1	2	0.500	FP			34	
126	James Carson	1920		1	3	0.333	FP			19	
126	Harry Hebner	1920		1	3	0.333	FP		5 ft 10.5 in (1.79 m)	29	
126	Sam Greller	1928		1	3	0.333	FP			23	
126	George Schroth	1928		1	3	0.333	FP		6 ft 4 in (1.93 m)	28	
126	Bob Bray	1948		1	3	0.333	CF			28	
126	Lee Case	1948		1	3	0.333	FP			30	
126	Chris Christensen	1948		1	3	0.333	FP			29	
126	Bob Saari	1964	7	1	3	0.333	FP	R	6 ft 2 in (1.88 m)	16	
134	Sam Kooistra	1956		1	4	0.250	FP		6 ft 0.5 in (1.84 m)	21	
134	Alex Roelse	2016	5	1	4	0.250	CB	R	6 ft 7 in (2.01 m)	21	
136	George Schroth	1924 (bronze)		1	5	0.200	FP		6 ft 4 in (1.93 m)	24	
136	Marvin Burns	1952		1	5	0.200	FP		6 ft 3.5 in (1.92 m)	24	
136	Bill Kooistra	1956		1	5	0.200	FP		5 ft 10.5 in (1.79 m)	30	
136	Thomas Dunstan	2016	2	1	5	0.200	D	L	6 ft 4 in (1.93 m)	18	
136	Jesse Smith	2016	11	1	5	0.200	U	R	6 ft 4 in (1.93 m)	33	
141	Bill Dornblaser	1952		1	7	0.143	FP			18	
141	Jon Svendsen	1984 (silver)	7	1	7	0.143	CB		6 ft 2.5 in (1.89 m)	30	
141	Tim Shaw	1984 (silver)	12	1	7	0.143	D		6 ft 2 in (1.88 m)	26	
141	Jeff Campbell	1988 (silver)	8	1	7	0.143	CB		6 ft 3.5 in (1.92 m)	25	
141	Omar Amr	2004	3	1	7	0.143	D		5 ft 10.5 in (1.79 m)	29	
141	Adam Wright	2004	5	1	7	0.143	D	R	6 ft 3 in (1.91 m)	27	
141	Chris Segesman	2004	6	1	7	0.143	CB		6 ft 3.5 in (1.92 m)	25	
141	Dan Klatt	2004	9	1	7	0.143	CB		6 ft 4.5 in (1.94 m)	25	
141	Brett Ormsby	2004	10	1	7	0.143	D		6 ft 2.5 in (1.89 m)	21	
141	Peter Hudnut	2008 (silver)	3	1	7	0.143	CB	R	6 ft 5 in (1.96 m)	28	
151	Peter Hudnut	2012	3	1	8	0.125	CB	R	6 ft 5 in (1.96 m)	32	
152	Barry Weitzenberg	1972 (bronze)	4	1	9	0.111	FP		6 ft 1 in (1.85 m)	25	
Rk	Player	Games	No.	G	MP	G/M	Pos	H	Height	Age	Ref

=== Historical progression – goals in an Olympic tournament ===
The following table shows the historical progression of the record of goals in an Olympic tournament.

G	Achievement	Games	No.	Player	Pos	H	Height	Date	Age	Duration of record	Ref
8	Set record	1904 (gold)		Budd Goodwin	FP			Sep 6, 1904	20	27 years, 340 days	
14	Broke record	1932 (bronze)		Phil Daubenspeck	FP			Aug 11, 1932	26	36 years, 75 days	
18	Broke record	1968	6	Bruce Bradley	FP		6 ft 2 in (1.88 m)	Oct 25, 1968	21	56 years, 132 days	

=== Leading scorers for each Olympic tournament ===
The following table shows the players with at least five goals for each Olympic tournament, and is pre-sorted by edition of the Olympics (in ascending order), number of goals (in descending order), Cap number or name of the player (in ascending order), respectively.

Chris Humbert is the first and only American male player to have been the team-leading scorer for three Olympic tournaments (1992–2000).

Leading scorers for each Olympic tournament
Games	No.	Player	G	MP	G/M	Pos	H	Height	Age	Ref
1904 (gold)		Budd Goodwin	8	2	4.000	FP			20	
1904 (silver)	No players with at least five goals									
1904 (bronze)	No players with at least five goals									
1920	No players with at least five goals									
1924 (bronze)	No players with at least five goals									
1928		Herbert Topp	6	3	2.000	FP			28	
1932 (bronze)		Phil Daubenspeck	14	4	3.500	FP			26	
1936	No players with at least five goals									
1948	No players with at least five goals									
1952		Bill Kooistra	7	7	1.000	FP		5 ft 10.5 in (1.79 m)	25	
1952		Bob Hughes	6	9	0.667	CF		6 ft 6 in (1.98 m)	21	
1956	No players with at least five goals									
1960		Fred Tisue	12	7	1.714	FP		5 ft 8.5 in (1.74 m)	21	
1960		Ron Crawford	5	6	0.833	D/CF	R	5 ft 10.5 in (1.79 m)	20	
1960		Wally Wolf	5	7	0.714	FP		5 ft 10.5 in (1.79 m)	29	
1964	No players with at least five goals									
1968	6	Bruce Bradley	18	8	2.250	FP		6 ft 2 in (1.88 m)	21	
1968	8	Barry Weitzenberg	8	8	1.000	FP		6 ft 1 in (1.85 m)	22	
1968	9	Gary Sheerer	8	8	1.000	FP		5 ft 8.5 in (1.74 m)	21	
1968	3	Russ Webb	6	8	0.750	CB		6 ft 2 in (1.88 m)	23	
1972 (bronze)	6	Bruce Bradley	17	9	1.889	FP		6 ft 2 in (1.88 m)	25	
1972 (bronze)	8	Jim Ferguson	9	9	1.000	D		6 ft 2 in (1.88 m)	23	
1972 (bronze)	5	Gary Sheerer	7	9	0.778	FP		5 ft 8.5 in (1.74 m)	25	
1972 (bronze)	2	Stan Cole	6	9	0.667	CF/D	R	6 ft 1 in (1.85 m)	26	
1972 (bronze)	3	Russ Webb	5	9	0.556	CB		6 ft 2 in (1.88 m)	27	
1972 (bronze)	7	Peter Asch	5	9	0.556	FP		6 ft 2 in (1.88 m)	23	
1984 (silver)	2	Kevin Robertson	13	7	1.857	D	L	5 ft 8.5 in (1.74 m)	25	
1984 (silver)	10	Terry Schroeder	13	7	1.857	CF		6 ft 2.5 in (1.89 m)	25	
1984 (silver)	11	Jody Campbell	10	7	1.429	CF		6 ft 2.5 in (1.89 m)	24	
1984 (silver)	3	Gary Figueroa	8	7	1.143	D		6 ft 0 in (1.83 m)	27	
1984 (silver)	6	Joe Vargas	5	7	0.714	D		6 ft 2.5 in (1.89 m)	28	
1988 (silver)	11	Jody Campbell	12	7	1.714	CF		6 ft 2.5 in (1.89 m)	28	
1988 (silver)	10	Terry Schroeder	10	7	1.429	CF		6 ft 2.5 in (1.89 m)	29	
1988 (silver)	13	Mike Evans	10	7	1.429	D		6 ft 2 in (1.88 m)	28	
1988 (silver)	3	James Bergeson	9	7	1.286	D		6 ft 0 in (1.83 m)	27	
1988 (silver)	4	Peter Campbell	9	7	1.286	CF/U		6 ft 3.5 in (1.92 m)	28	
1988 (silver)	2	Kevin Robertson	8	7	1.143	D	L	5 ft 8.5 in (1.74 m)	29	
1992	4	Mike Evans	7	6	1.167	D		6 ft 2 in (1.88 m)	32	
1992	9	Chris Humbert	7	7	1.000	CF	L	6 ft 6.5 in (1.99 m)	22	
1992	12	Erich Fischer	7	7	1.000	CB/U		6 ft 2.5 in (1.89 m)	26	
1992	5	Doug Kimbell	5	7	0.714	CB		6 ft 8.5 in (2.04 m)	32	
1992	11	Craig Klass	5	6	0.833	CF	L	6 ft 4.5 in (1.94 m)	27	
1992	13	Alex Rousseau	5	7	0.714	CF	L	6 ft 4.5 in (1.94 m)	24	
1996	10	Chris Humbert	14	8	1.750	CF	L	6 ft 6.5 in (1.99 m)	26	
1996	5	Chris Oeding	11	8	1.375	D		6 ft 0.5 in (1.84 m)	24	
1996	13	Wolf Wigo	8	8	1.000	D		6 ft 1.5 in (1.87 m)	23	
1996	3	Jeremy Laster	7	8	0.875	D	L	6 ft 4.5 in (1.94 m)	22	
1996	6	Gavin Arroyo	6	8	0.750	CB		6 ft 2.5 in (1.89 m)	24	
1996	8	Rick McNair	6	8	0.750	CB		6 ft 4.5 in (1.94 m)	24	
1996	11	Mike Evans	5	8	0.625	D		6 ft 2 in (1.88 m)	36	
2000	9	Wolf Wigo	16	8	2.000	D		6 ft 1.5 in (1.87 m)	27	
2000	10	Chris Humbert	16	8	2.000	CF	L	6 ft 6.5 in (1.99 m)	30	
2000	8	Tony Azevedo	13	8	1.625	D	R	6 ft 1 in (1.85 m)	18	
2000	5	Chris Oeding	8	8	1.000	D		6 ft 0.5 in (1.84 m)	29	
2004	8	Tony Azevedo	15	7	2.143	D	R	6 ft 1 in (1.85 m)	22	
2004	11	Jesse Smith	9	7	1.286	U	R	6 ft 4 in (1.93 m)	21	
2004	2	Wolf Wigo	7	7	1.000	D		6 ft 1.5 in (1.87 m)	31	
2004	7	Layne Beaubien	5	7	0.714	CB	R	6 ft 5.5 in (1.97 m)	28	
2008 (silver)	8	Tony Azevedo	17	7	2.429	D	R	6 ft 1 in (1.85 m)	26	
2008 (silver)	7	Layne Beaubien	8	7	1.143	U	R	6 ft 5.5 in (1.97 m)	32	
2008 (silver)	4	Jeff Powers	6	7	0.857	U	R	6 ft 7 in (2.01 m)	28	
2008 (silver)	9	Ryan Bailey	6	7	0.857	CF	R	6 ft 5.5 in (1.97 m)	32	
2008 (silver)	2	Peter Varellas	5	7	0.714	D	L	6 ft 3 in (1.91 m)	23	
2012	9	Ryan Bailey	13	8	1.625	CF	R	6 ft 5.5 in (1.97 m)	36	
2012	2	Peter Varellas	11	8	1.375	D	L	6 ft 3 in (1.91 m)	27	
2012	8	Tony Azevedo	11	8	1.375	D	R	6 ft 1 in (1.85 m)	30	
2012	4	Jeff Powers	5	8	0.625	CB	R	6 ft 7 in (2.01 m)	32	
2012	5	Adam Wright	5	8	0.625	D	R	6 ft 3 in (1.91 m)	35	
2016	10	Bret Bonanni	8	5	1.600	D	R	6 ft 4 in (1.93 m)	22	
2016	7	Josh Samuels	7	5	1.400	D	R	6 ft 4 in (1.93 m)	25	
2016	8	Tony Azevedo	5	5	1.000	D	R	6 ft 1 in (1.85 m)	34	
Games	No.	Player	G	MP	G/M	Pos	H	Height	Age	Ref

== Players with at least three goals (a hat-trick) in an Olympic match ==
The following table is pre-sorted by number of goals (in descending order), date of the match (in ascending order), Cap number or name of the player (in ascending order), respectively.

In water polo, if a player scores three times in a game, a hat-trick is made. Thirty-two American athletes have each made at least one hat-trick in an Olympic match.

Tony Azevedo is the American water polo player with the most hat-tricks made at the Olympic Games, scoring 11.

Bruce Bradley and Chris Humbert are the joint American male players with the second most hat-tricks made at the Olympic Games, scoring 6.

Players with at least three goals in an Olympic match
Rk	Player	Games	No.	G	Date	Match	Pos	H	Age	Ref
1	Herbert Topp	1928		6	Aug 8, 1928	United States 10–0 Malta	FP		28	
1	Phil Daubenspeck	1932 (bronze)		6	Aug 6, 1932	United States 6–1 Brazil	FP		26	
3	Budd Goodwin	1904 (gold)		5	Sep 6, 1904	(United States) NYAC 6–0 (United States) CAA	FP		20	
3	Phil Daubenspeck	1932 (bronze)		5	Aug 7, 1932	United States 10–0 Japan	FP		26	
3	Fred Tisue	1960		5	Aug 27, 1960	United States 10–4 France	FP		21	
3	Tony Azevedo	2008 (silver)	8	5	Aug 10, 2008	United States 8–4 China	D	R	26	
7	Bill Kooistra	1952		4	Jul 27, 1952	United States 8–3 Great Britain	FP		25	
7	Bruce Bradley	1968	6	4	Oct 16, 1968	United States 10–7 Spain	FP		21	
7	Terry Schroeder	1988 (silver)	10	4	Sep 23, 1988	United States 14–7 China	CF		29	
7	Jody Campbell	1988 (silver)	11	4	Sep 26, 1988	United States 18–9 Greece	CF		28	
7	Chris Humbert	1996	10	4	Jul 21, 1996	United States 9–7 Greece	CF	L	26	
7	Chris Humbert	2000	10	4	Sep 25, 2000	United States 12–8 Netherlands	CF	L	30	
7	Wolf Wigo	2004	2	4	Aug 17, 2004	United States 9–6 Kazakhstan	D		31	
7	Tony Azevedo	2008 (silver)	8	4	Aug 24, 2008	Hungary 14–10 United States	D	R	26	
7	Tony Azevedo	2012	8	4	Aug 2, 2012	United States 13–7 Great Britain	D	R	30	
7	Bret Bonanni	2016	10	4	Aug 8, 2016	Spain 10–9 United States	D	R	22	
17	Budd Goodwin	1904 (gold)		3	Sep 5, 1904	(United States) NYAC 5–0 (United States) MAC	FP		20	
17	Austin Clapp	1932 (bronze)		3	Aug 7, 1932	United States 10–0 Japan	FP		21	
17	Phil Daubenspeck	1932 (bronze)		3	Aug 9, 1932	United States 4–4 Germany	FP		26	
17	Bill Kooistra	1952		3	Jul 26, 1952	United States 6–3 Romania	FP		25	
17	Jack Spargo	1952		3	Jul 26, 1952	United States 6–3 Romania	D		21	
17	Bob Hughes	1952		3	Jul 27, 1952	United States 8–3 Great Britain	CF		21	
17	Bob Hughes	1952		3	Jul 30, 1952	United States 4–2 Belgium	CF		21	
17	Fred Tisue	1960		3	Sep 1, 1960	United States 7–6 Netherlands	FP		21	
17	Ron Crawford	1964	2	3	Oct 12, 1964	United States 7–1 Brazil	D/CF	R	24	
17	Gary Sheerer	1968	9	3	Oct 14, 1968	United States 10–5 Brazil	FP		21	
17	Russ Webb	1968	3	3	Oct 16, 1968	United States 10–7 Spain	CB		23	
17	Gary Sheerer	1968	9	3	Oct 17, 1968	United States 6–6 Cuba	FP		21	
17	Bruce Bradley	1968	6	3	Oct 22, 1968	United States 7–5 West Germany	FP		21	
17	Bruce Bradley	1968	6	3	Oct 24, 1968	United States 6–3 Netherlands	FP		21	
17	Bruce Bradley	1968	6	3	Oct 25, 1968	United States 6–4 East Germany	FP		21	
17	Barry Weitzenberg	1968	8	3	Oct 25, 1968	United States 6–4 East Germany	FP		22	
17	Bruce Bradley	1972 (bronze)	6	3	Aug 28, 1972	United States 7–6 Cuba	FP		25	
17	Bruce Bradley	1972 (bronze)	6	3	Sep 3, 1972	United States 6–6 Soviet Union	FP		25	
17	Joe Vargas	1984 (silver)	6	3	Aug 1, 1984	United States 12–5 Greece	D		28	
17	Kevin Robertson	1984 (silver)	2	3	Aug 2, 1984	United States 10–4 Brazil	D	L	25	
17	Gary Figueroa	1984 (silver)	3	3	Aug 2, 1984	United States 10–4 Brazil	D		27	
17	Kevin Robertson	1984 (silver)	2	3	Aug 3, 1984	United States 10–8 Spain	D	L	25	
17	Terry Schroeder	1984 (silver)	10	3	Aug 6, 1984	United States 8–7 Netherlands	CF		25	
17	Kevin Robertson	1984 (silver)	2	3	Aug 7, 1984	United States 12–7 Australia	D	L	25	
17	Terry Schroeder	1984 (silver)	10	3	Aug 7, 1984	United States 12–7 Australia	CF		25	
17	Jody Campbell	1984 (silver)	11	3	Aug 7, 1984	United States 12–7 Australia	CF		24	
17	James Bergeson	1988 (silver)	3	3	Sep 22, 1988	Spain 9–7 United States	D		27	
17	Jody Campbell	1988 (silver)	11	3	Sep 23, 1988	United States 14–7 China	CF		28	
17	Mike Evans	1988 (silver)	13	3	Sep 23, 1988	United States 14–7 China	D		28	
17	James Bergeson	1988 (silver)	3	3	Sep 26, 1988	United States 18–9 Greece	D		27	
17	Alan Mouchawar	1988 (silver)	7	3	Sep 26, 1988	United States 18–9 Greece	U		28	
17	Chris Humbert	1992	9	3	Aug 3, 1992	United States 11–7 France	CF	L	22	
17	Wolf Wigo	1996	13	3	Jul 21, 1996	United States 9–7 Greece	D		23	
17	Chris Humbert	1996	10	3	Jul 22, 1996	United States 9–7 Ukraine	CF	L	26	
17	Mike Evans	1996	11	3	Jul 23, 1996	United States 10–5 Romania	D		36	
17	Chris Oeding	1996	5	3	Jul 28, 1996	United States 12–8 Serbia and Montenegro	D		24	
17	Wolf Wigo	2000	9	3	Sep 23, 2000	Croatia 10–7 United States	D		27	
17	Tony Azevedo	2000	8	3	Sep 25, 2000	United States 12–8 Netherlands	D	R	18	
17	Tony Azevedo	2000	8	3	Sep 27, 2000	United States 9–3 Greece	D	R	18	
17	Tony Azevedo	2000	8	3	Sep 29, 2000	Russia 11–10 United States	D	R	18	
17	Wolf Wigo	2000	9	3	Sep 29, 2000	Russia 11–10 United States	D		27	
17	Wolf Wigo	2000	9	3	Sep 30, 2000	United States 9–8 Croatia	D		27	
17	Chris Humbert	2000	10	3	Sep 30, 2000	United States 9–8 Croatia	CF	L	30	
17	Chris Humbert	2000	10	3	Oct 1, 2000	Italy 10–8 United States	CF	L	30	
17	Tony Azevedo	2004	8	3	Aug 15, 2004	United States 7–6 Croatia	D	R	22	
17	Tony Azevedo	2004	8	3	Aug 27, 2004	United States 6–5 Australia	D	R	22	
17	Tony Azevedo	2004	8	3	Aug 29, 2004	United States 9–8 Italy	D	R	22	
17	Jesse Smith	2004	11	3	Aug 29, 2004	United States 9–8 Italy	U	R	21	
17	Jeff Powers	2008 (silver)	4	3	Aug 12, 2008	United States 12–11 Italy	U	R	28	
17	Tony Azevedo	2008 (silver)	8	3	Aug 16, 2008	United States 7–5 Croatia	D	R	26	
17	Tony Azevedo	2008 (silver)	8	3	Aug 22, 2008	United States 10–5 Serbia	D	R	26	
17	Peter Varellas	2012	2	3	Jul 29, 2012	United States 8–7 Montenegro	D	L	27	
17	Peter Varellas	2012	2	3	Jul 31, 2012	United States 10–8 Romania	D	L	27	
17	Ryan Bailey	2012	9	3	Jul 31, 2012	United States 10–8 Romania	CF	R	36	
17	Ryan Bailey	2012	9	3	Aug 2, 2012	United States 13–7 Great Britain	CF	R	36	
17	Alex Bowen	2016	9	3	Aug 8, 2016	Spain 10–9 United States	D	R	22	
17	Josh Samuels	2016	7	3	Aug 10, 2016	United States 6–3 France	D	R	25	
Rk	Player	Games	No.	G	Date	Match	Pos	H	Age	Ref

== See also ==
- United States men's Olympic water polo team statistics
  - United States men's Olympic water polo team statistics (appearances)
  - United States men's Olympic water polo team statistics (matches played)
  - United States men's Olympic water polo team statistics (goalkeepers)
  - United States men's Olympic water polo team statistics (medalists)
- List of United States men's Olympic water polo team rosters
- United States men's Olympic water polo team results
- United States men's national water polo team
