= KAP7 =

American manufacturer of water polo equipment

KAP7 International, Inc.
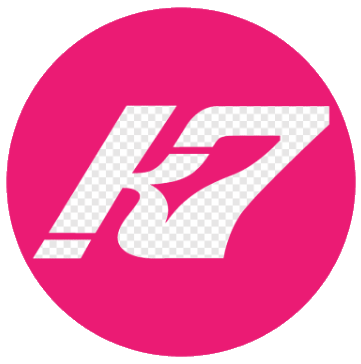
- Type: Private
- Industry: Sports equipment
- Founded: 2004; 22 years ago
- Founders: Brad Schumacher; Wolf Wigo
- Headquarters: Irvine, CA, U.S.
- Area served: Worldwide
- Key people: Brad Schumacher (President); Wolf Wigo (Vice president)
- Products: Water polo equipment
- Website: kap7.com

KAP7 International, Inc. is an American manufacturer of water polo equipment. Products include sportswear (one-piece swimsuits, swim briefs), other apparel (t-shirts, leggins), and sporting goods (balls, goals).

== History ==
KAP7 was founded in California by Brad Schumacher and Wolf Wigo in 2004. Schumacher is an American competitive swimmer, water polo player, and two-time Olympic champion. Wigo is an American water polo player and three-time Olympian.

== Water polo sponsorships ==
KAP7 has been the official water polo ball provider for the following leagues and associations:

Americas

- USA Water Polo (USAWP), since 2017, extended in 2021
- National Collegiate Athletic Association (NCAA), since 2011, extended in 2014, 2017 and 2020
  - NCAA Men's Water Polo Championship
  - NCAA Women's Water Polo Championship

Europe

- Ligue Européenne de Natation (LEN), since 2017
  - European Water Polo Championship
  - LEN European U19 Water Polo Championship
  - LEN European Junior Water Polo Championship
  - LEN Europa Cup
  - LEN Champions League
  - LEN Euro Cup
  - LEN Super Cup
  - LEN Euro League Women
  - Women's LEN Trophy
  - Women's LEN Super Cup

Oceania

- Water Polo Australia (WPA), since 2018, extended in 2019 and 2020
  - Australian Youth Water Polo Championships

World

- World Aquatics (AQUA), since 2025
  - Water polo at the World Aquatics Championships
  - World Aquatics U20 Water Polo Championships
  - World Aquatics U18 Water Polo Championships
