= Glossary of water polo =

The following terms are used in water polo. Rules below reflect the latest FINA Water Polo Rules.

== 0–9 ==
2 meter defense
See hole D.
2 meter line
The line at each end of the pool crossing 2 meters in front of the goal, designated by a red mark on the edge of the pool. The edge of the playing area from the 2 meter mark to the goal line is a red line.
2 meter offense
See center forward.
2 meter zone or area
The area between the 2 meter line and the goal line. No attacking player may be in this area without the ball.
3-3 offense
A basic positional offense composed of two lines containing 3 players each: point and two drivers along the 5 meter line, and wings and center forward along the 2 meter line.
4 meter line (obsolete)
Prior to FINA rule changes in 2005, this was the position for penalty throws, replaced by the present 5 meter line.

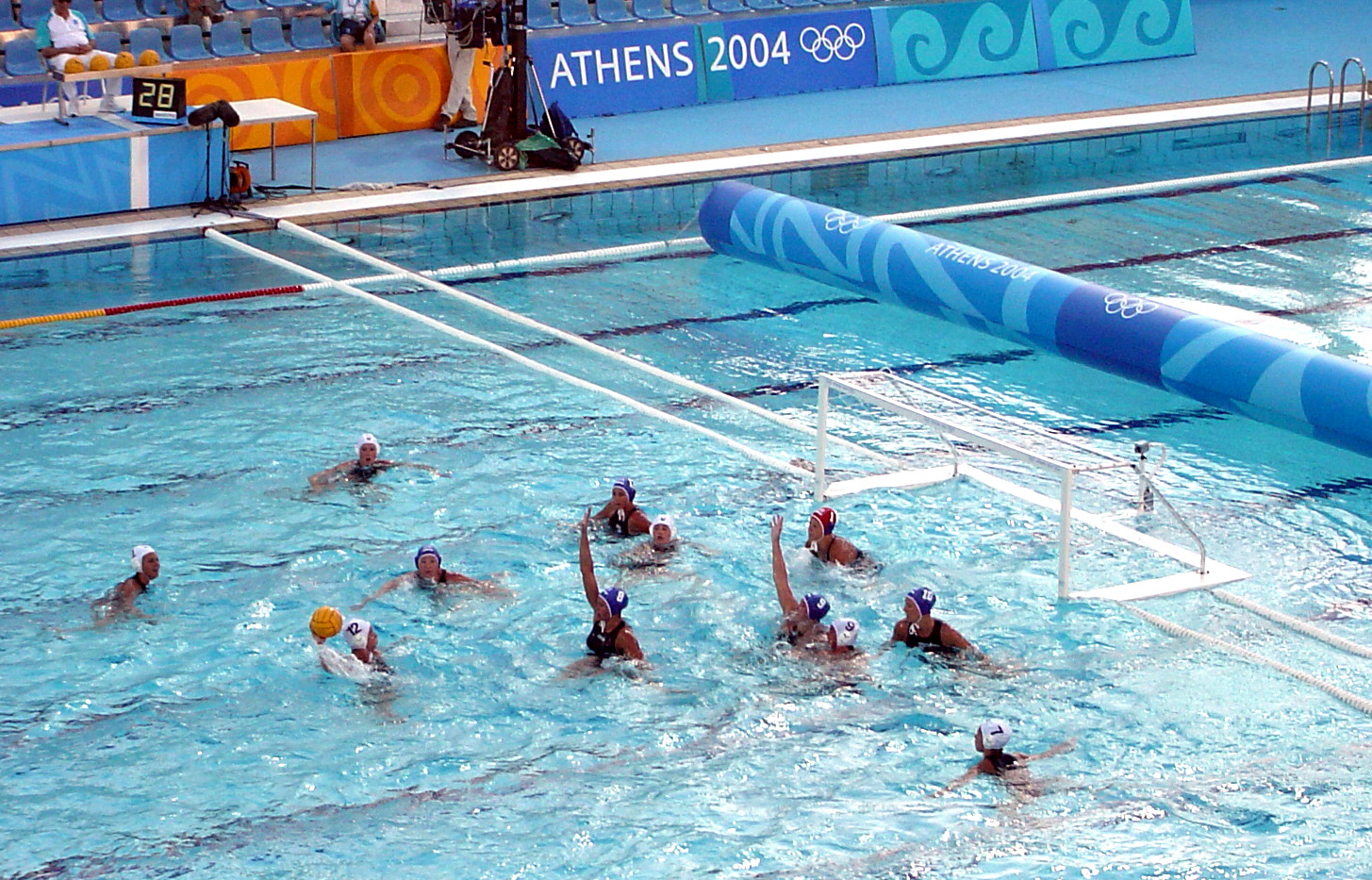
4-2 Offense in Man up situation

4-2 offense
Team on offense positions four players on the 2 meter line, and two players on 5 meter line. Commonly used in man up situations.
5 meter line
The line at each end of the pool crossing 5 meters in front of the goal, designated by a yellow mark on the edge of the pool. The edge of the pool from the 5 meter mark to the 2 meter mark is a yellow line. A player may shoot at the goal from beyond this line without taking a free pass after an ordinary foul, if the shot is made with one continuous motion.
5 meter shot
See penalty shot.
6 on 5 offense
See man-up.
7 meter line (obsolete)
Prior to FINA rule changes in 2005, this was the position for a direct shot on goal after fouls, replaced by the present 5 meter line.

== A ==
advantage rule
The referee may refrain from calling a foul if it would give an advantage to the offending player's team.
angle
cutting the angle: The path that a defender must swim to cut off a fast breaking attacker.
goal angle: The triangle between the ball carrier and the two goal posts. The goalkeeper must play the angle, or position him/herself to best contest the shot.
assist
A pass to a teammate that leads directly to scoring a goal.
attacker
A field player on the team in possession of the ball; see Offense (sports).

== B ==
back door
Offensive player on the weak side gets behind their defender and open for a quick shot.
backhand
A pass or shot in which the ball carrier flips the ball directly behind him/her.

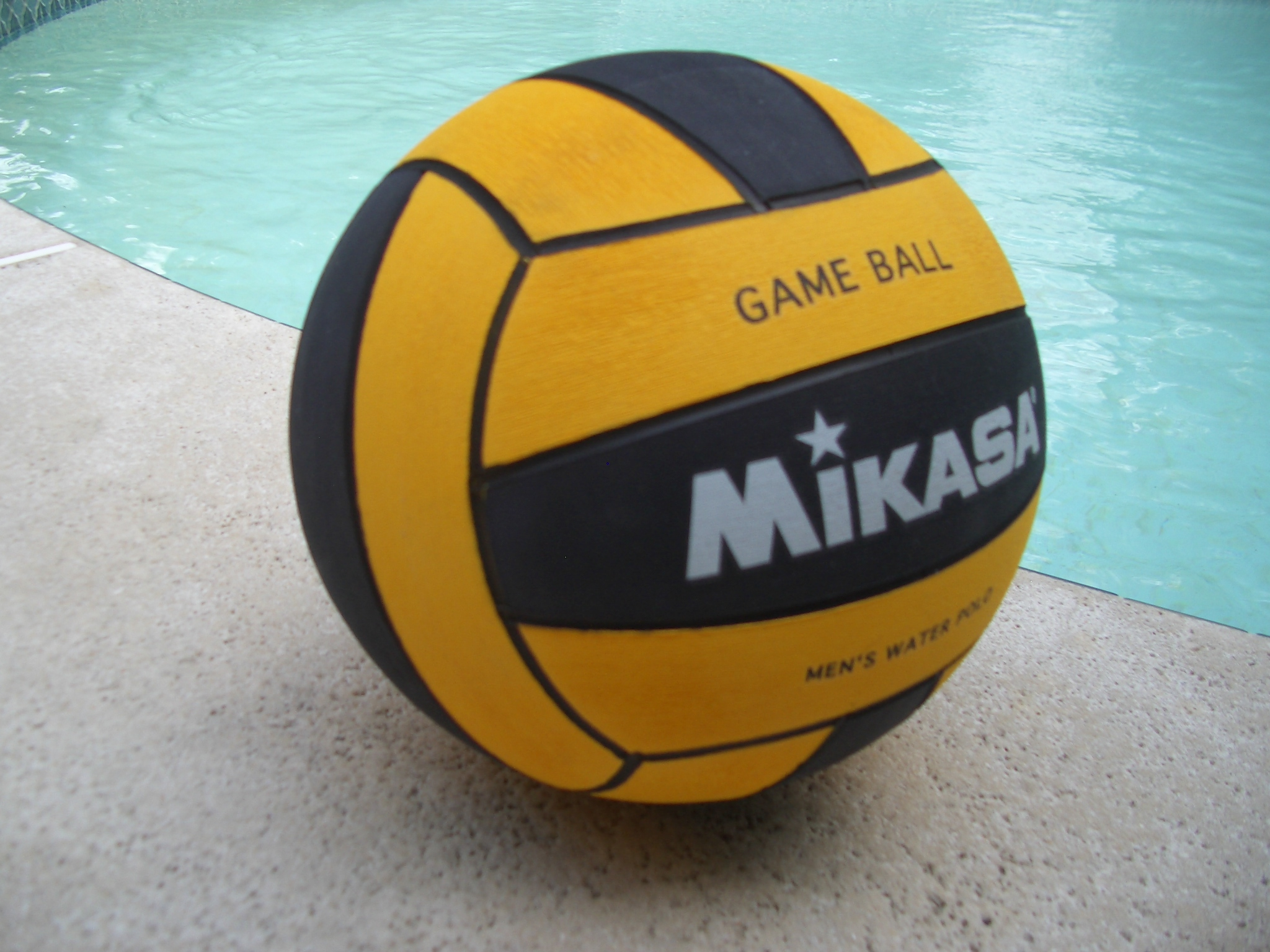
Water polo balls: old (left) and new designs.

ball
A water polo ball is usually a bright yellow color with a gripable surface, allowing it to be held with one hand despite its large size. The cover is a buffed rubberized fabric over a wound nylon fiber base with an inflatable bladder. Ball weight is 400-450 grams (14-16 ounces) and inflated to approximately 90 kPa (13 PSI) of pressure. Water polo balls come in two main sizes: size 5 (0.7 meters or 28 inches in circumference), intended for use by men, and size 4 (0.65 meters or 26.5 inches in circumference), intended for women.
ball out
The referee calls for the ball to be thrown to him/her during a timeout or dead time.
ball under
The player holding the ball, if it is forced under water as a result of contact with a defender, is charged with an ordinary foul, and loses possession.
baulk
See pump fake.
bat shot
See t shot.
blue ball
Shouted to teammates when dark cap team has possession.
bounce shot
See skip shot.
box out
As a shot or pass is taken, a player moves quickly in front of the opponent to prevent the opponent from recovering the pass or rebound.
breakaway
See fast break.
brutality
A violent foul with intention to harm. The fouling player is ejected from the game without substitution. The opponents are awarded a penalty shot, and the ejected player's team plays one man down for the next four minutes of game time. This type of foul is signaled by the referee by crossing the arms in the form of an X.
bunny
A goal scored on a power shot close to the goalkeepers head.

== C ==
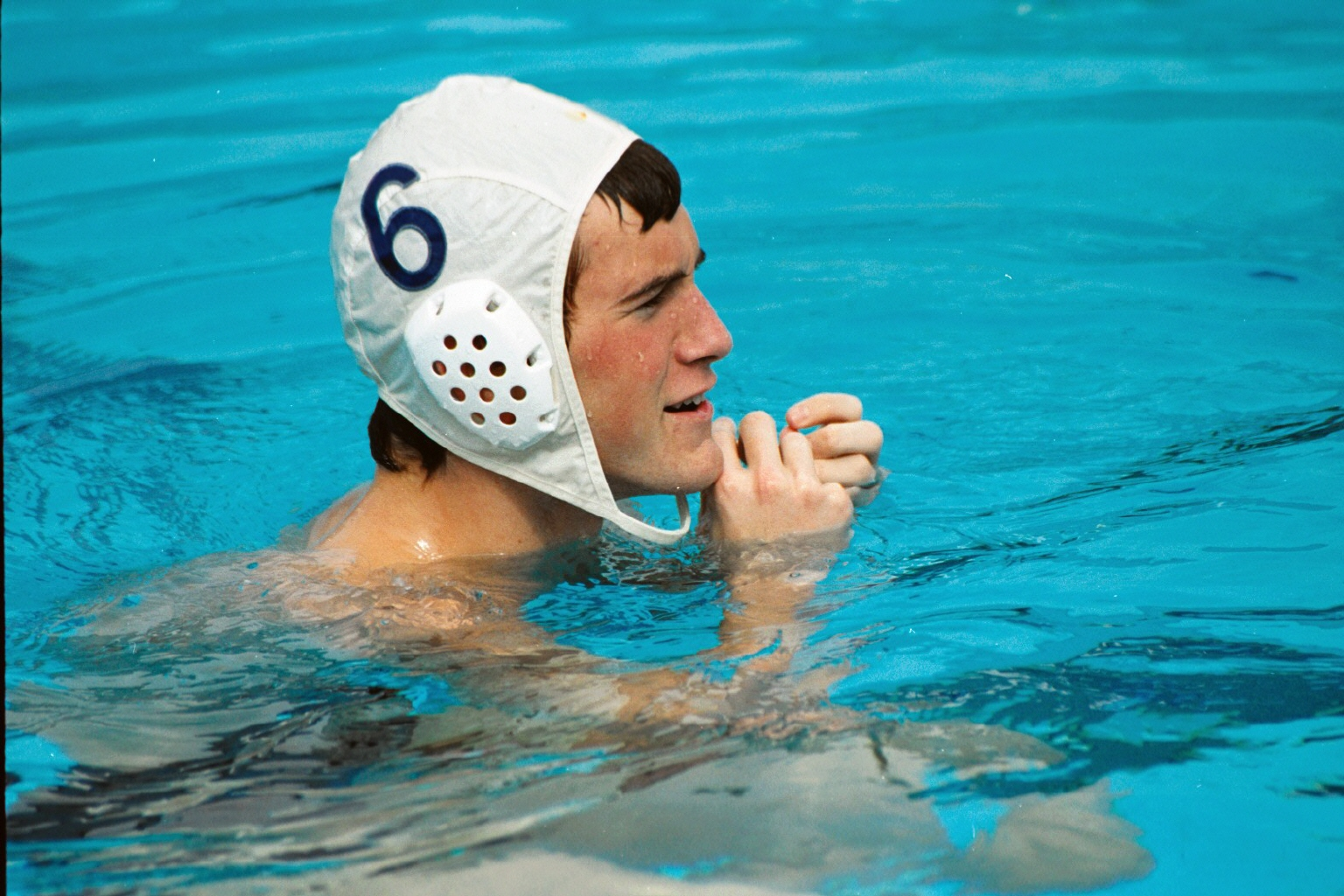
field player cap

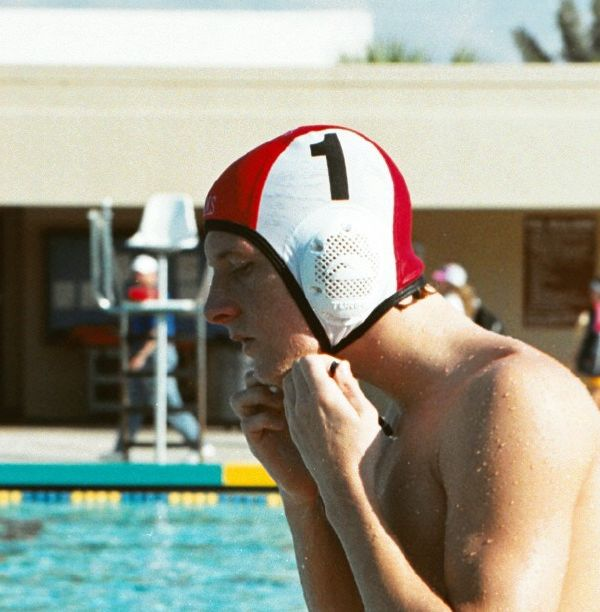
goalkeeper cap

caps
Visiting team field players wear numbered white caps, and home team field players wear dark caps. Both starting goalkeepers wear quartered red caps, numbered "1", substitute goalies caps are numbered either "1-A" in NCAA play or "13" for FINA international play. Caps are fitted with ear protectors.
center forward
Offense player positioned at the 2 meter line in front of the opposing team's goal. Also called 2 meter offense or hole set.
check
To place a hand or forearm on an opponent's chest to hinder movement or maintain position. Also called chug.
cherry picking
A player stays on their offensive end of the pool when the rest of their team is defending, waiting for a turnover, often resulting in a long pass and uncontested goal.
commit
To make a move or take a position over other options, from which recovery is difficult.

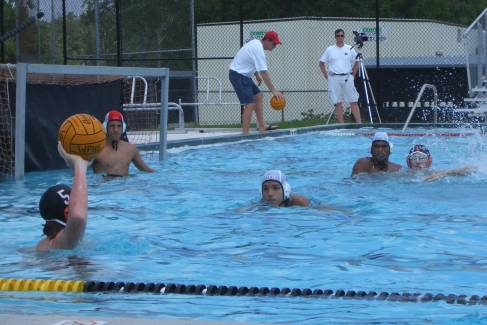
Corner throw from the 2 meter line

corner throw
Free throw awarded to the attacking team when the ball is deflected over the goal line and out of the playing area by the goalkeeper (but NOT defending field player). An attacker puts the ball in play from the 2 meter mark at the edge of the pool.
counterattack, counter
Transition when the defensive team regains control of the ball, advances the ball and sets up offense in front of the opponent's goal.
cover back
Call to defensive teammates to defend players between them and their goal.
crash back
All six defensive field players swim back rapidly to the center of their end as soon as the other team recovers possession, to counter the offensive counterattack.

== D ==
dead time
The time between the whistle for a foul and the restarting of play and the clock. A foul during dead time results in a player ejection. See free throw.
donut
A goal scored over the goalie's outstretched arms.
double post
Offense with two attackers on the 2 meter line in front of the opponent's goal. Also called double hole.
draw a foul (ejection)
Causing an opponent to receive a foul (or ejection).

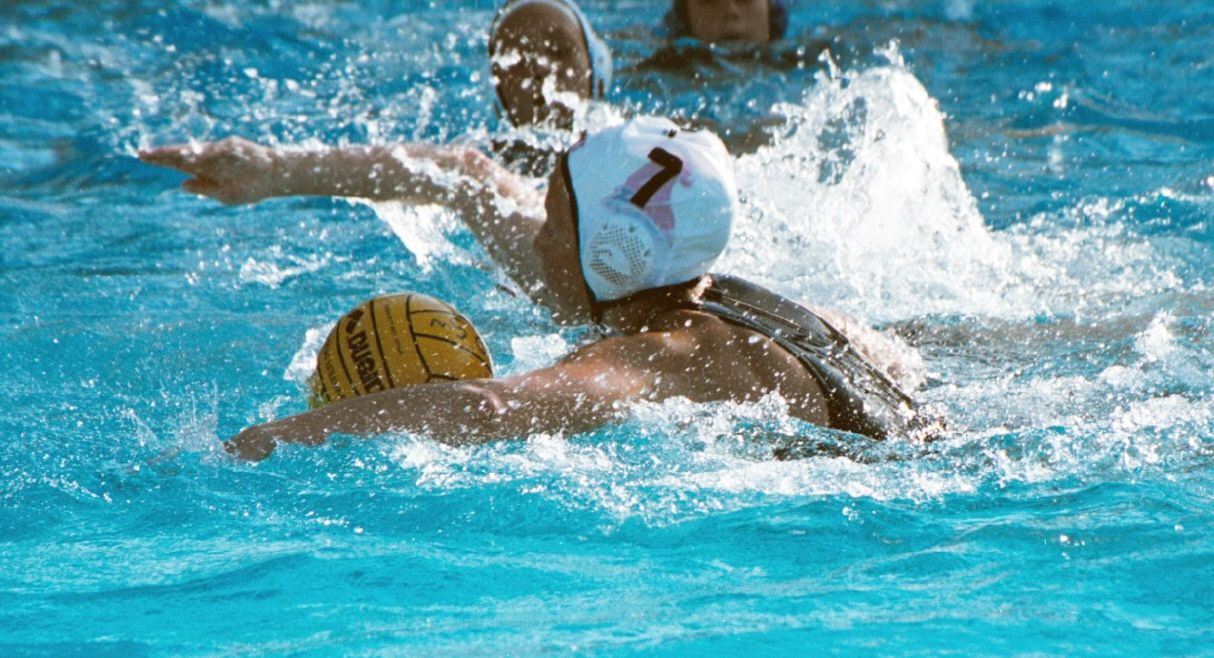
Attacker (7) advances the ball by dribbling

dribbling
The technique of moving the ball while swimming forward, propelled ahead of the player with the wake created by alternating armstrokes. Since ball contact is minimal, this creates advantage for the ball carrier advancing the ball; their defender may not make contact unless the attacker is touching the ball.
driver
A perimeter player in the 3-3 offense, positioned on either side of the point or center forward, who attempts to swim toward the goal to escape their defender, receive the ball and score.
drop
Defenders swim back to the center of the pool to block passes and shots by advancing attackers, while a defender presses the ball carrier to cause a hurried pass.

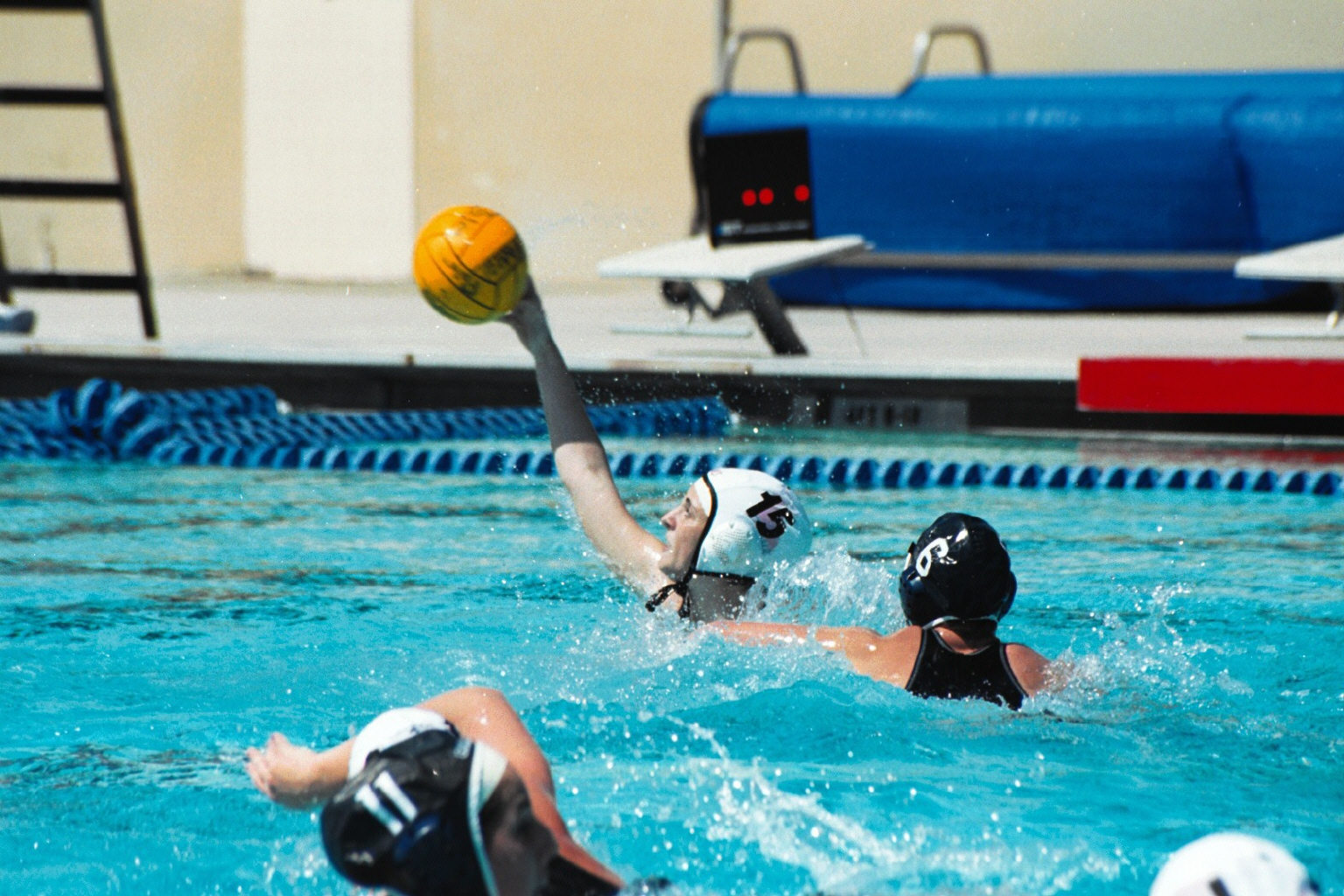
Catching a dry pass

dry pass
A pass thrown and caught in one hand between players; the ball does not touch the water. This pass allows for optimal speed due to fluid motion between catching and throwing.
dumping the ball
An attacking player throws the ball into a far corner, away from the defenders, before the 30 seconds of possession expires for their team, to avoid a fast break opportunity for the opposing team.

== E ==
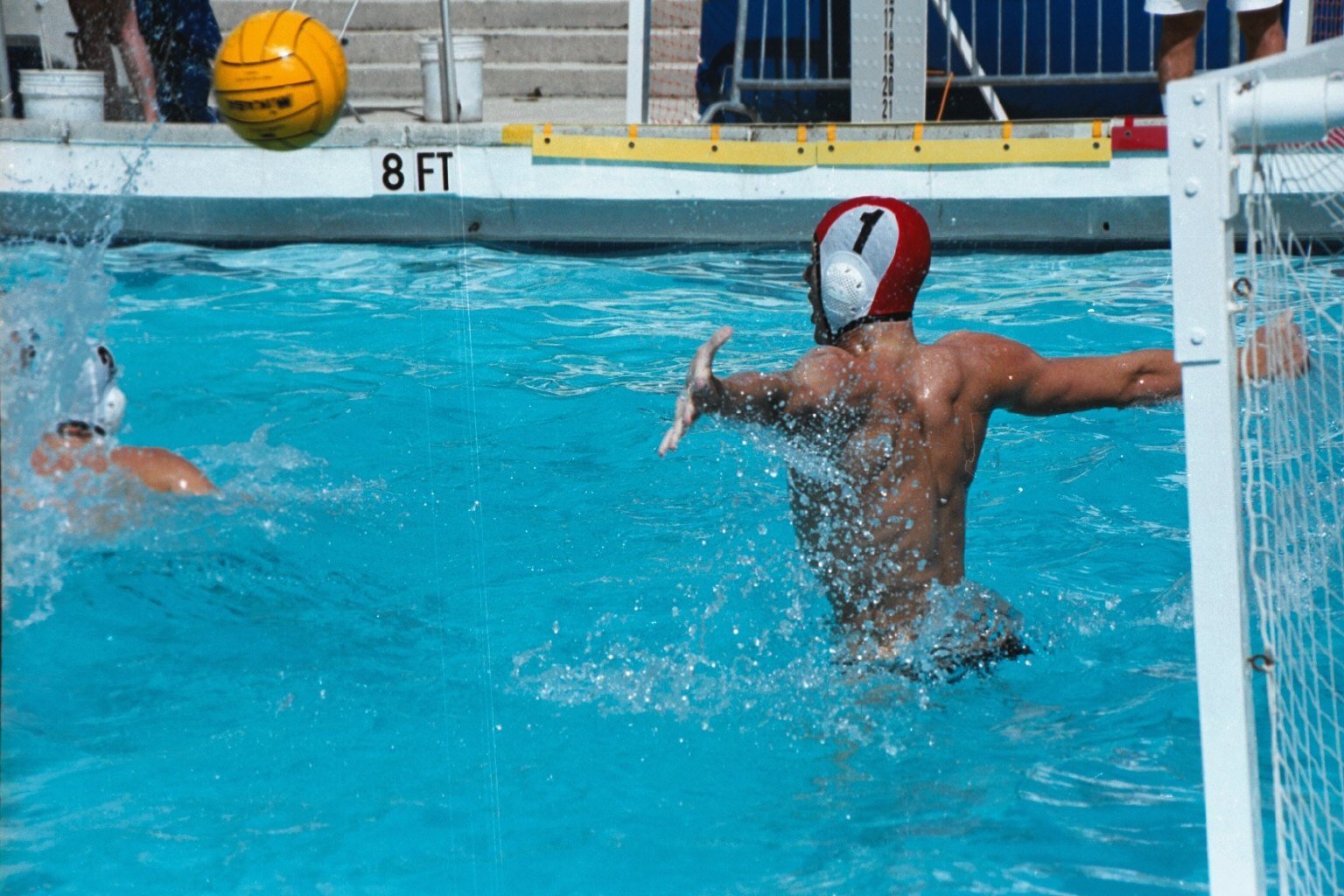
Goalie eggbeatering up to block a shot.

egg-beater
A form of treading water, named because the circular movement of the legs resembles the motion of an egg-beater. This kick allows the player to maintain a constant position to the water level, and also by kicking faster for a brief period the player can get high out of the water for a block, pass, or shot.
ejection
See exclusion foul.
entry pass
Also called entering the ball, refers to the pass, most often a wet pass, into the center forward or 2-meter man. Most offenses focus on entering the ball early in the shot clock, and reacting if a foul or ejection is drawn.

== F ==
face off
See neutral throw.
fast break
The team recovering the ball, usually after an unexpected turnover, sprints to the opponent's goal to gain an advantage in numbers or position, and an easy goal.
field player
One of a team's six players who swim up and down the field of play, excluding the goalkeeper.
FINA
Federation Internationale de Natation, the international organization governing water polo (and swimming) competitions and rules.
flat
An offensive player position, on either side of the point, about 5 to 8 meters out from the goal. See also driver.
fouls
Very common in water polo, both as a defensive strategy or because of holding (usually underwater) and rough play.

Ordinary or minor foul: The referee signals with one short whistle blow and points one hand to the spot of the foul and the other hand in the direction of the team who gains possession. Play continues immediately.

- If by a defender preventing the free movement of an opponent who is not holding the ball, the attacking team has a free throw. The player fouled has three seconds to make a free pass to another offensive player.
- If the attacking team delays play, allows the ball to be pushed underwater, has a player inside the two meter area without the ball or pushes a defending player to create space for a pass or shot, the opposing team is given possession of the ball and play resumes immediately.

Exclusion or major foul: A referee signals a major foul by two short whistle bursts and indicates that the player must leave the field without impacting play and move to the penalty area for twenty seconds.

- Dunking (sinking in FINA rules), intentional splashing, or pulling an opponent back who does not have the ball, also interfering with a free throw or attempting to block a shot with two hands.
- Striking another player intentionally, misconduct or disrespect will also result in exclusion for the entire game.

Penalty foul: The referee signals by blowing their whistle and raising five fingers.

- Any foul is committed inside the 5-meter line and the offensive player had an opportunity to score, or a goal was prevented by the foul. A penalty shot is awarded from the five meter line.

Exclusion and penalty fouls are called personal fouls. A player who receives three personal fouls must sit out the remainder of the match.

free throw
After an ordinary foul, a player of the team retaining possession of the ball puts the ball in play without delay. The defender may not challenge the player in possession until the ball leaves their hand. After a foul, the player putting the ball in play may only make a direct shot on goal if he/she is beyond the 5 meter line and shoots with one continuous motion.
front
Defensive tactic by the hole D when guarding the center forward close to the 2 meter line. The hole D moves between the center forward and the ball to cut off the passing lane.

== G ==
gamed
A player is "gamed" who receives a third exclusion foul or is removed from play for misconduct and may not return for the remainder of the game. Often referred to as being "wrapped".
give and go
Offensive move where player passes the ball and then drives toward the goal to receive a pass and attempt a shot.
goal
Refers to both the result of a score and the physical structure that defines where a score is achieved. A goal is scored after the ball passes completely over the goal line, between the goal posts and under the crossbar. The goal posts are 3 meters apart and the crossbar is 0.9 meters above the water surface.
goal line
The line at each end of the pool crossing the front of the goal, designated by a white mark on the edge of the pool. The playing area extends 0.3 meters behind the goal line, which must be at least 1.66 meters from the pool wall.
goal judge
Official positioned at each goal line who rules on entry of players, goal scoring, corner and penalty throws, and the start of play.
goalkeeper or goalie
The player for each team assigned to remain directly in front of the goal to prevent the opposite team from scoring. Within the five meter area in front of their goal, the goalkeeper may touch the ball with two hands, strike the ball with a clenched fist and touch the bottom of the pool (pool depth permitting). Unlike the field players, he/she cannot cross the half-distance line. Both goalkeepers wear quartered red caps, numbered "1".
goal throw
A free pass by the defending goalkeeper from behind the 2 meter line to restart play, if anyone but the defending goalkeeper was last to touch the ball before it went out over the goal line.
greenie
A quick shot taken by a perimeter player following a pass from the hole set. Derived from guerrini.

== H ==
half-distance line
The midpoint of the pool or playing area, designated on the pool edge by a white mark. The ball is dropped here at the start of play. The edge of the playing area from the half-distance line to each 5 meter line is marked with a green line.

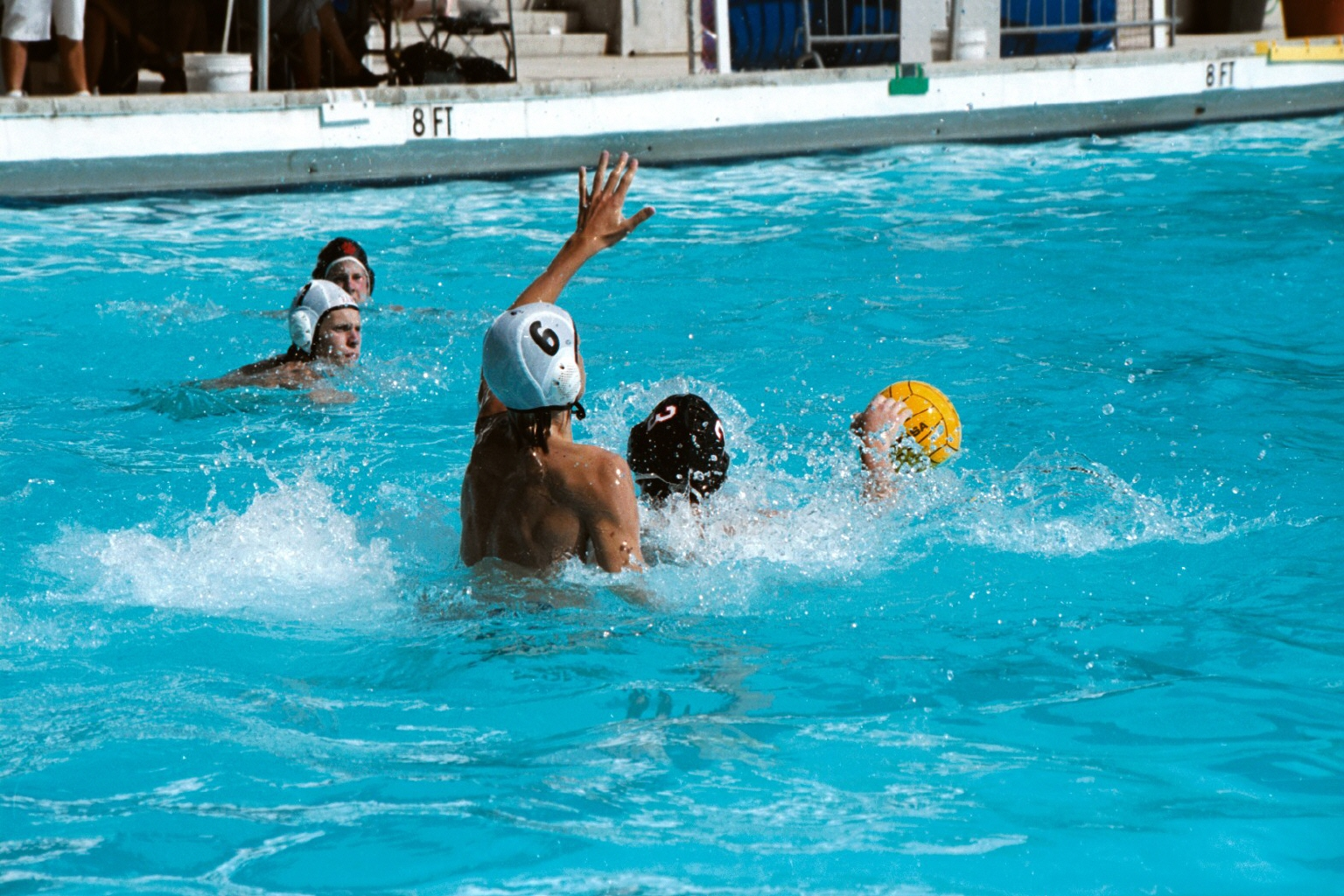
Action in the hole: Hole D (6) and Hole set (3)

hole
Position directly in front of the goal, closest to the 2 meter line.
hole D
Defense player or position on the 2 meter line directly in front of the goal. This position is also called 2 meter defense or hole guard.
hole set
Offense player or position on the 2 meter line directly in front of the goal. This position is also called 2 meter offense or center forward.

== I ==
impede
Defensive guarding that prevents a player from moving; a foul if the impeded player does not have the ball.
inner tube water polo
A version of water polo in which players are allowed to float in inner tubes to avoid treading water during the game, which requires superb conditioning. Usually played as an intramural sport on college campuses, often coed.
inside water
Best position for a defender: between the attacker he/she is guarding and the goal.
inside water shot
The shooter swims toward the goal and unexpectedly flips the ball out of the water past the goalkeeper into the goal, timed with their swimming stroke. Examples are the pop shot and spring shot.

== J ==
Jam
Defenders crash back and occupy the center of the pool, forcing any fast break to the outside and toward the perimeter positions. See drop.

== K ==
kickout (KO)
See exclusion foul.

== L ==
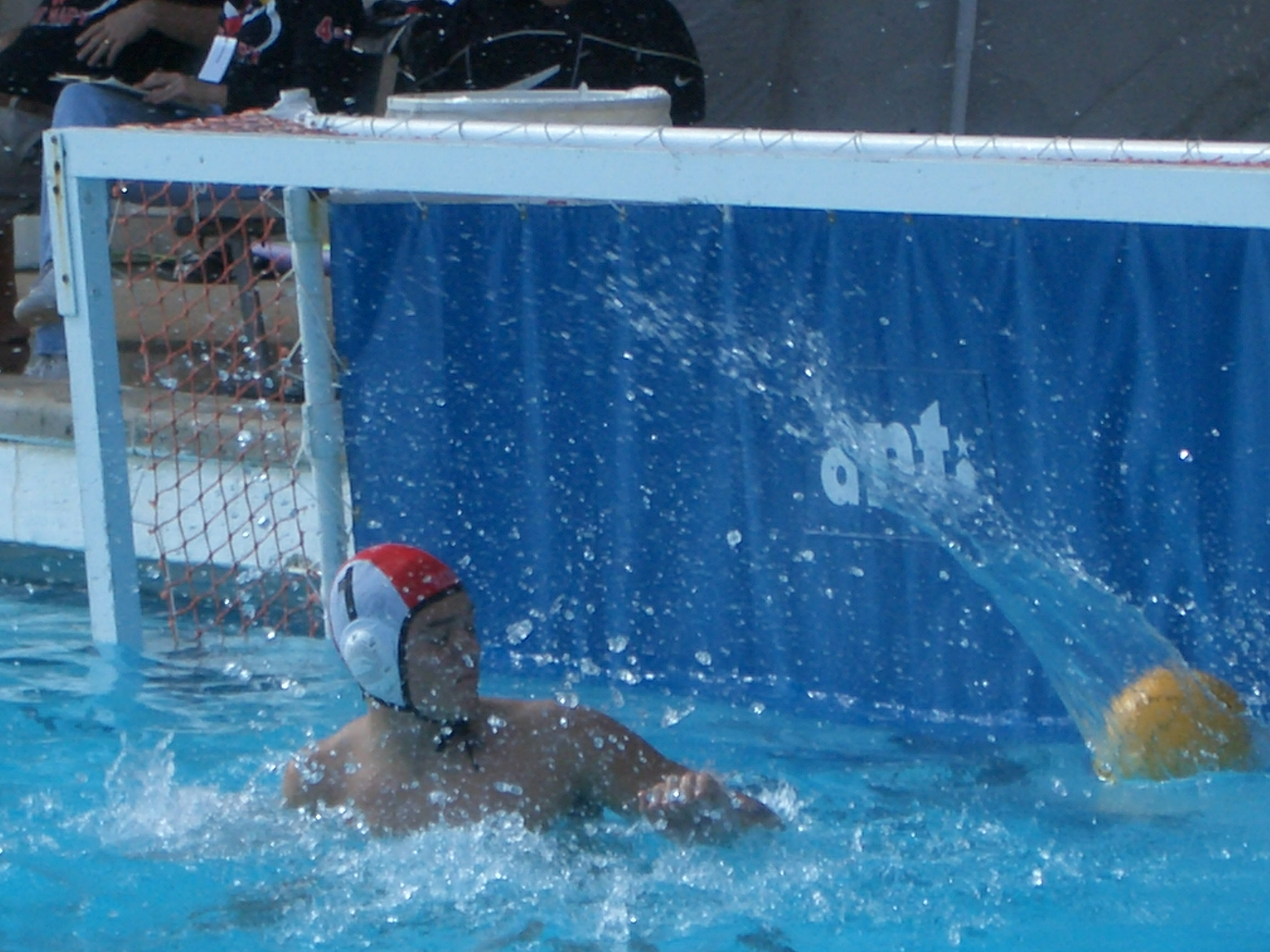
The lob shot

lane press
Defenders closely guard the player with the ball and attempt to block the passing lanes.
lead
To throw a pass ahead of a teammate who is swimming.
loading the ball
To transfer the ball from one hand to the other immediately before a shot, often misdirecting the goalkeeper and increasing the speed and suddenness of the shot.
lob shot
An outside water shot thrown with a high arc, intended to pass over the goalie's hands and under the crossbar.

== M ==
m-drop
A defensive scheme in which defense sets up in an M-shape, hence the name "M-Drop". It is generally used when the offense has a strong center or the center defender has lost position.

man to man
Defensive tactic where each attacker is guarded by a specific defender, regardless of their position on the field of play.
man up
A team has one player more than its opponent, after a player of the opposing team is ejected for an exclusion foul.:
math
A tactical approach to winning games.

== N ==
natural goal
A goal scored from play with both teams at full strength, i.e., not a man up or penalty throw.
neutral throw
The referee restarts play by throwing the ball into the pool between two opposing players, giving each an equal opportunity to recover the ball (like a jump ball in basketball). A neutral throw results when players of each team commit a fouls at the same time, or if the referees disagree on which team committed a foul.
no set
A call from the goalie or point to their offensive teammates to avoid passing the ball into the hole set because of close coverage by defenders. See setting the ball.

== O ==
open
When an offensive player is not guarded by a defender.
outlet pass
During the counterattack, the goalkeeper looks to pass to an open teammate downfield who is fast breaking to the goal or setting up the offense.
outside water shot
The shooter holds the ball out of water before taking the shot at the goal, i.e.: power shot, lob shot or skip shot. Outside water shots require a player to stop swimming, and usually occur outside the 2 meter zone.
overplay
A player commits too early and is caught out of position by an opponent's move.
overtime
If the score is tied at the end of regulation play, two overtime periods of three minutes each are played. Overtime periods are common in tournament play due to the high level of skill of these superior teams.

== P ==
pass
see dry pass and wet pass.
passing lane
The path between the player with the ball and their teammate to whom he/she intends to pass.
period
The game is divided into four periods; the length depends on the level of play:

Level of play	Team level	Time each period	Authority
FINA Water Polo World League	National	8 minutes	FINA
Olympics	National	8 minutes	IOC
US College	Varsity	8 minutes	NCAA
US High School	Varsity	7 minutes	NFHS
US High School	Junior Varsity	6 minutes	NFHS
US High School	Freshman/Sophomore	5 minutes	NFHS

penalty shootout
A tie breaker if the score is tied after two overtime periods. Five players and a goalkeeper are chosen by the coaches of each team. Players shoot from the 5-meter line alternately at either end of the pool in turn until all five have taken a shot. If the score is still tied, the same players shoot alternately until one team misses and the other scores, deciding the winner.
penalty shot
See penalty throw.

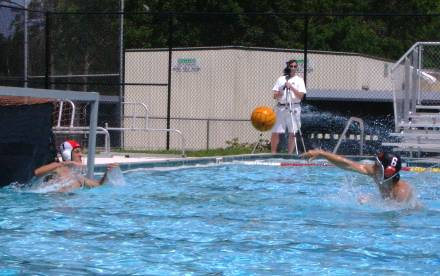
Penalty throw

penalty throw
A shot awarded when any foul is committed inside the five meter line and the offensive player had an opportunity to score, or a goal was prevented by the foul. The penalty shot is attempted from five meters with play stopped. Any defenders flanking the player taking the shot must be no closer than two meters. The goalkeeper must be on the goal line. The referee signals with a whistle and by lowering their arm, and the player taking the penalty shot must immediately throw the ball with an uninterrupted motion toward the goal.
perimeter player
The five offensive positions, other than the center forward, i.e.: wings, drivers and point. The perimeter players interchange their positions several times during a single offensive play.
point
Position on offense in the center of the line furthest from the goal. The point player's position provides opportunities to pass to teammates and communicate among the offense, like the point guard in basketball.
pop shot
An inside water shot, executed by scooping the ball with the non-dominant hand, and "popping" the ball upward, as the player treads up out of the water to meet the ball at its highest point with their outstretched dominant hand and shoots at the goal. During the flight of the ball, from when it is "Popped" up until it reaches the shooting-hand, and contact from behind by a defender will result in a 5-meter penalty shot, and thus it is an effective tool when one has inside water.
possession
Undisputed control of the ball. The team with the ball has 30 seconds to take a shot until possession is given to the opposing team.
power play
See man up.
power shot
An outside water shot in which a player propels their body out of the water and uses their momentum to shoot the ball into the net.
press
Defensive pressure on the attacking team by closely defending each player man to man. See also lane press.
pump fake
When using an outside water shot, the player gets in position to shoot and but stops halfway through, immobilizing or misdirecting the goalkeeper before releasing the ball.

== Q ==
quarter
See period.

== R ==
rear-back
a move used by an attacking player to create space between him/herself and their defender in an attempt to become open for a pass and subsequently attempt a shot. The attacker begins to swim toward the opponents' goal and abruptly stops and slides backward, awaiting a pass from a teammate, usually the center or 2-meter man.
rebound
After an unsuccessful shot at the goal, the ball becomes free in the water, and can be recovered by the offense for another goal attempt or by the defense for a counterattack. A rebound after a shot on goal resets the 30 second possession clock.
red
Shouted to teammates when 10 seconds remain on the shot clock, or in cases where a different color (usually yellow) is used to signify 10 seconds, red can be used to warn teammates of only 5 seconds remaining on the shot clock.

Bench personnel are cautioned with a yellow card, and sent off with a red card.

red card
Shown by a referee to signify that a coach, substitute, or bench personnel has been excluded for misconduct, and is required to leave the pool area immediately and cannot return to the game. See also yellow card.
red flag
A red flag is used by officials at the scorer/timekeeper's table to signal when a player has received three exclusion fouls and must sit out the rest of the game.
reentry area
Area at each end of the pool near each team bench, designated by a red line, where players may enter and exit the playing area for substitution or exclusion penalties.
referee
The two referees control the players, game play and the playing area throughout the match. Their decisions are final including rule infractions, fouls, scoring, possession of the ball and rulings of the timekeeper and goal judges. One referee stands on each side of the pool. The referee with the goal to their right when a team is on the attack is called the attacking or offensive referee. The other, the defensive referee, remains as far back as the attacking player who is furthest from the goal. When the other team regains the ball, their roles reverse as the ball moves to the other goal.
release
To break free from a defender to receive a pass.
rolled
the foul regarding a misconduct or game exclusion. This is because of the referee's circular arm motions signifying the player is done for the game.

== S ==
save
Successful blocked shot by the goalkeeper. Also called a stop.
setting a screen (or pick)
An offense player is positioned to allow their teammate to swim by, while blocking or delaying their defender.
setting the ball
To pass the ball into the center forward, ideally just out of reach of their defender, allowing the center to lunge for the ball and sweep it into the goal with a backhand or power shot.
shot clock
A clock at each corner of the pool deck counting down (from 30 seconds) the time remaining for a team to take a shot. Also known as the possession clock.

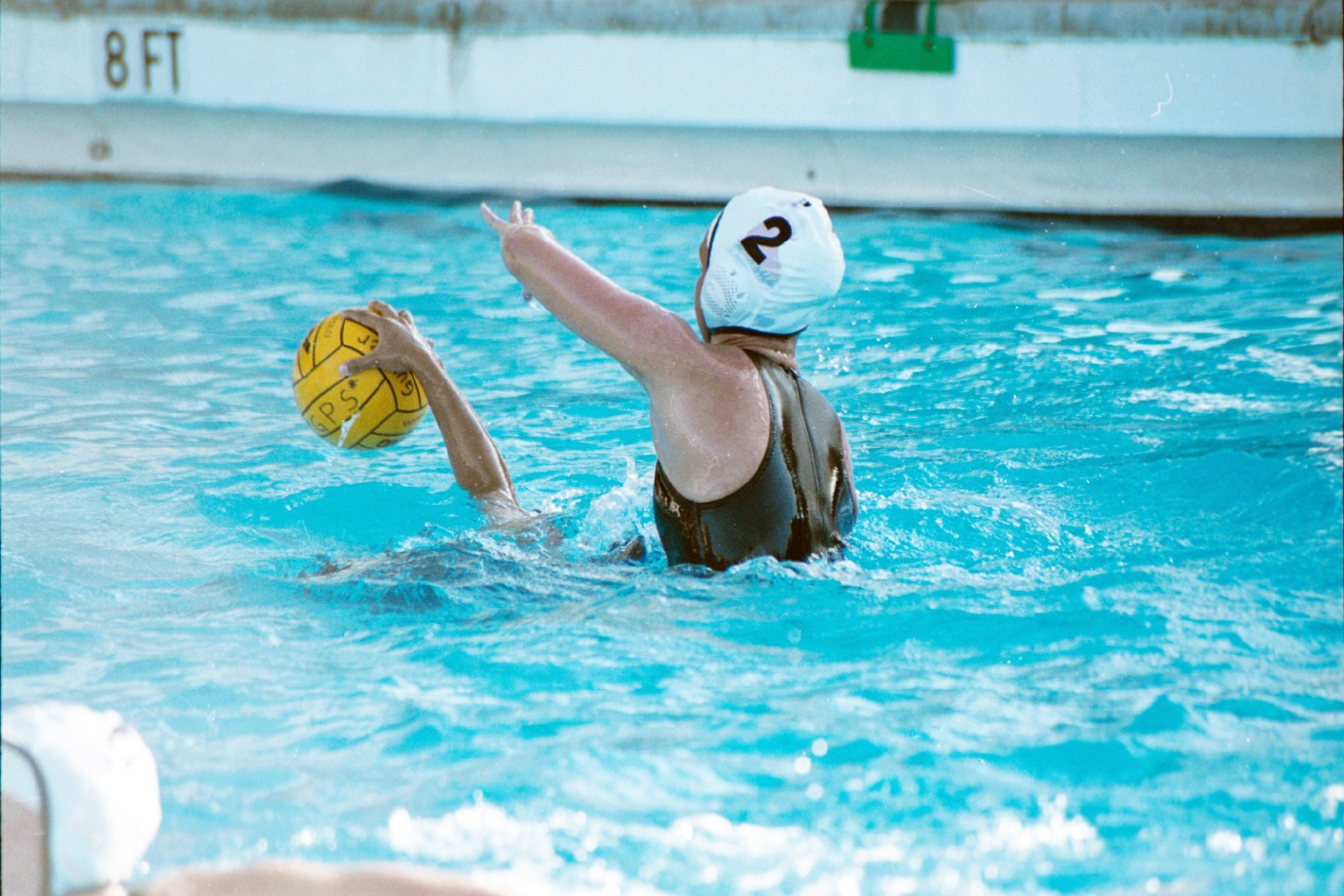
Defender (2) is sinking attacker with the ball

sink
To push an opposing player under the water, an exclusion foul if the player is not holding the ball and is in a position of offensive advantage.
skip shot
An outside water shot executed by throwing the ball at an angle directly into the water. If done properly and with enough force, the ball will skip off the water into the goal, since the goalkeeper cannot easily anticipate the angle. Also called a bounce shot.
slough
A defensive perimeter player intentionally causes an ordinary foul and then moves toward the goal, away from their attacker, who must take a free throw. This tactic allows the defense an opportunity to double-team the hole set and possibly steal the inbound pass. Also called foul and in or foul and drop.
spring shot
An inside water shot executed by pushing the ball slightly into the water (but avoiding a ball under foul) and then allowing a sudden release, and a soft tap-in to beat the goalkeeper.

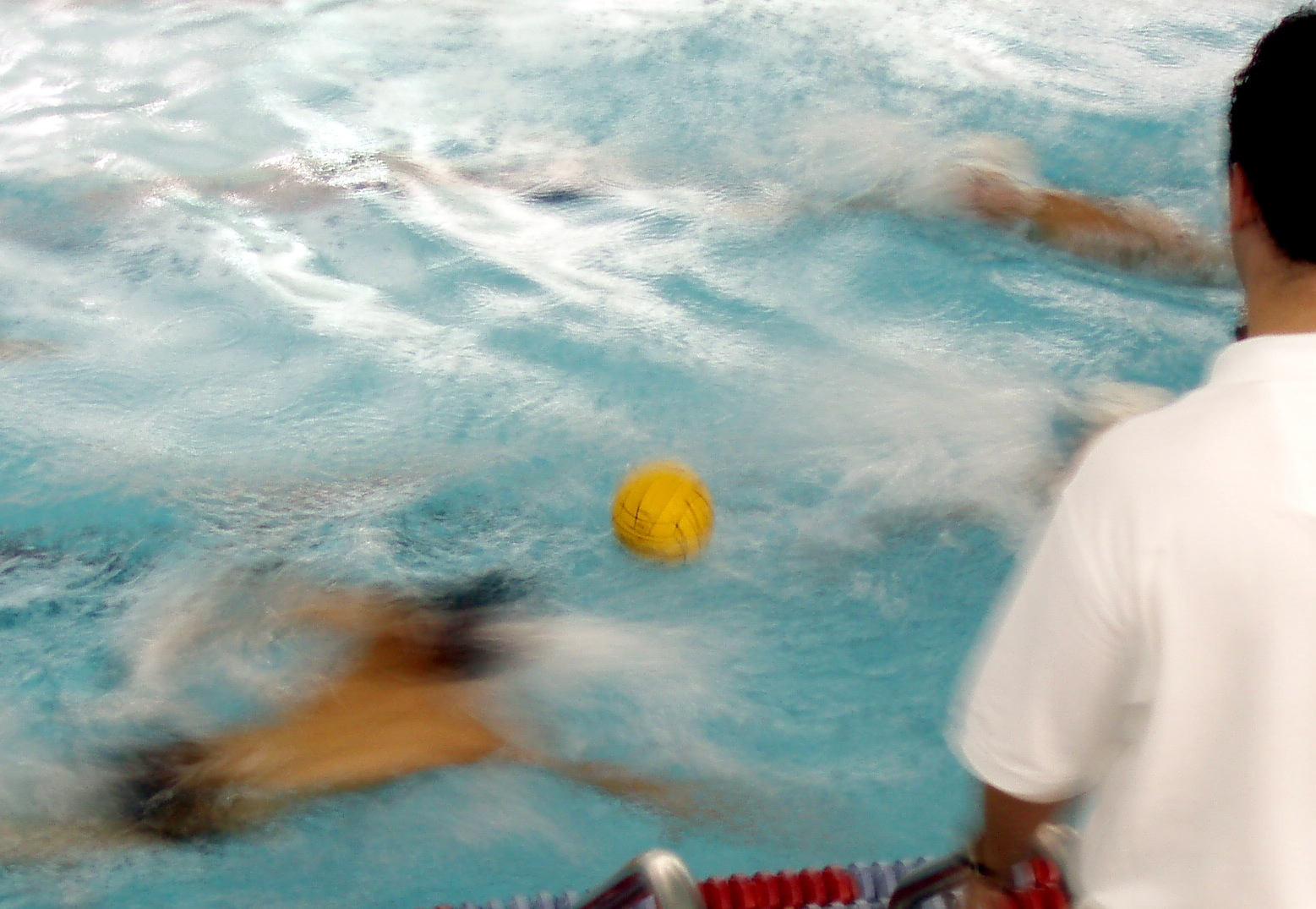
Swimoff or sprint to begin play

sprint
At the start of each period, teams line up on their own goal line. At the referee's whistle, both teams swim to midpoint of the field, where the referee drops the ball. The first team to recover the ball begins their offense.
stalling
Failing to take a shot within 30 seconds or intentional delay in advancing the ball results in a turnover.
steal
A steal occurs when a defensive player or goalkeeper legally causes a turnover by their positive, aggressive action(s).
swim off
See sprint.
switch
Players change defensive assignments to cover a teammate who has fallen behind an opponent, or to match up better with an offensive player in size or speed.

== T ==
tee shot
Executed by scooping the ball with the non-dominant hand, loading the ball to the dominant hand, and propelling the ball forward. The off-hand sets itself up as a tee, as in golf or baseball, and the two hands also finish in the shape of a "T".
timeout
Each team may call two 60 second timeouts in the four periods of regulation play, and one timeout if the game goes into overtime. During game play, only the team in possession of the ball may call a timeout.
tube water polo
See inner tube water polo
turn a defender
An offensive move to get by an opponent using leverage or strength. The result is a 180 degree turn, where the defender is "wheeled" around, resulting in the attacking player possessing inside-water, or position towards the goal, with the defender trailing behind. This maneuver often results in the defender being forced to foul.
turnover
A team loses possession of the ball, which reverts to the opponent, as a result of a foul or possession for more than 30 seconds without a shot on goal.

== U ==
utility player
A player skilled at several offensive or defensive roles, often coming off the bench for substitutions.
USA Water Polo
The National Governing Body (NGB) for the sport of water polo in the United States.

== V ==
V-cut
Offensive player cuts in and quickly out of the defender's area, pushing off of the defender to increase speed; making the letter "V" . Also called "V-out".

== W ==
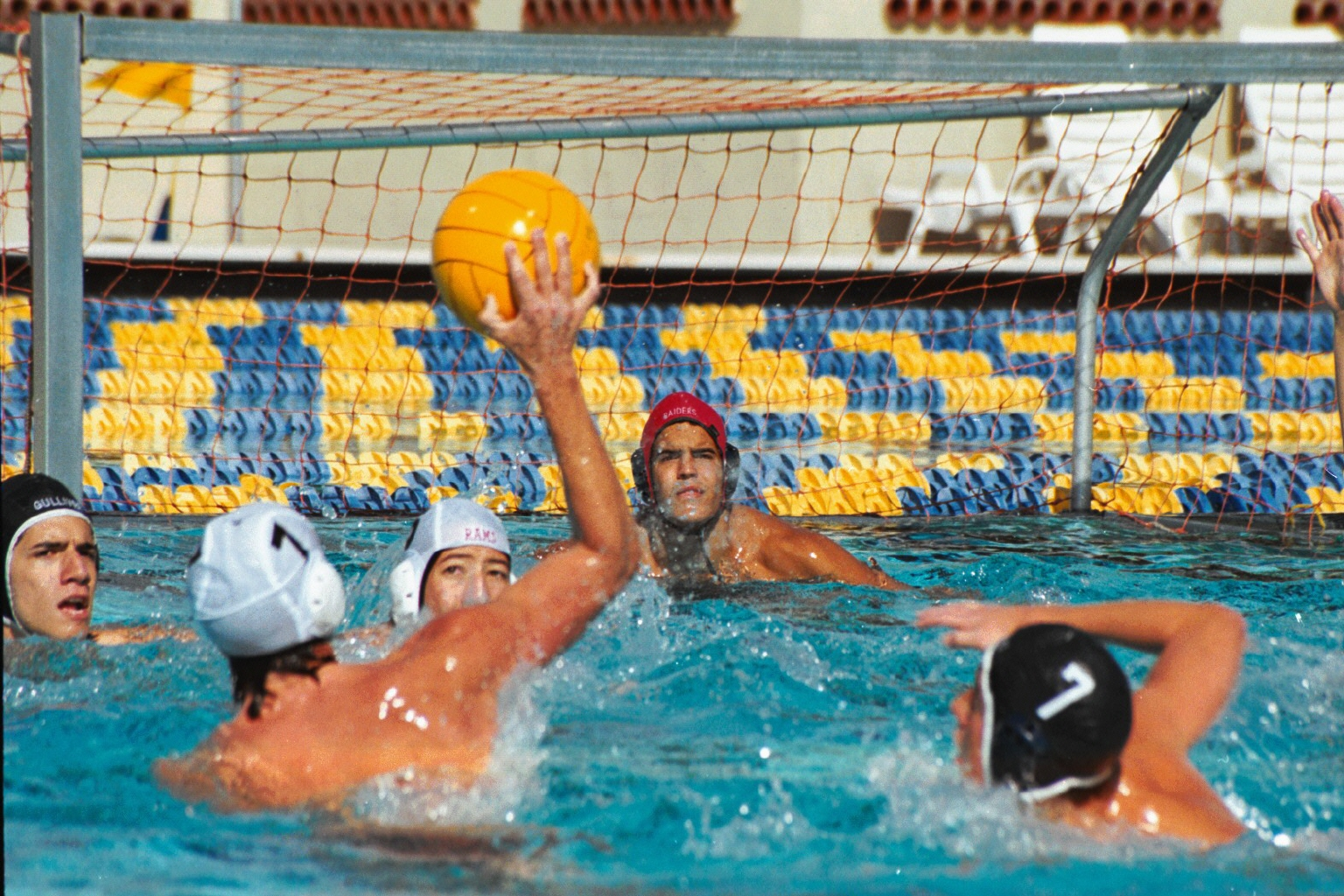
Attacker (7 white) walking in the ball

walk it in
The attacker grips the ball in one hand and either eggbeaters or strokes in toward the goal.
weak side
When an offensive player has possession of the ball on one side of the playing area (the strong side), the opposite side is called the weak side. Players will shout "weak" to notify a teammate with the ball that they are open on the other side of the pool.

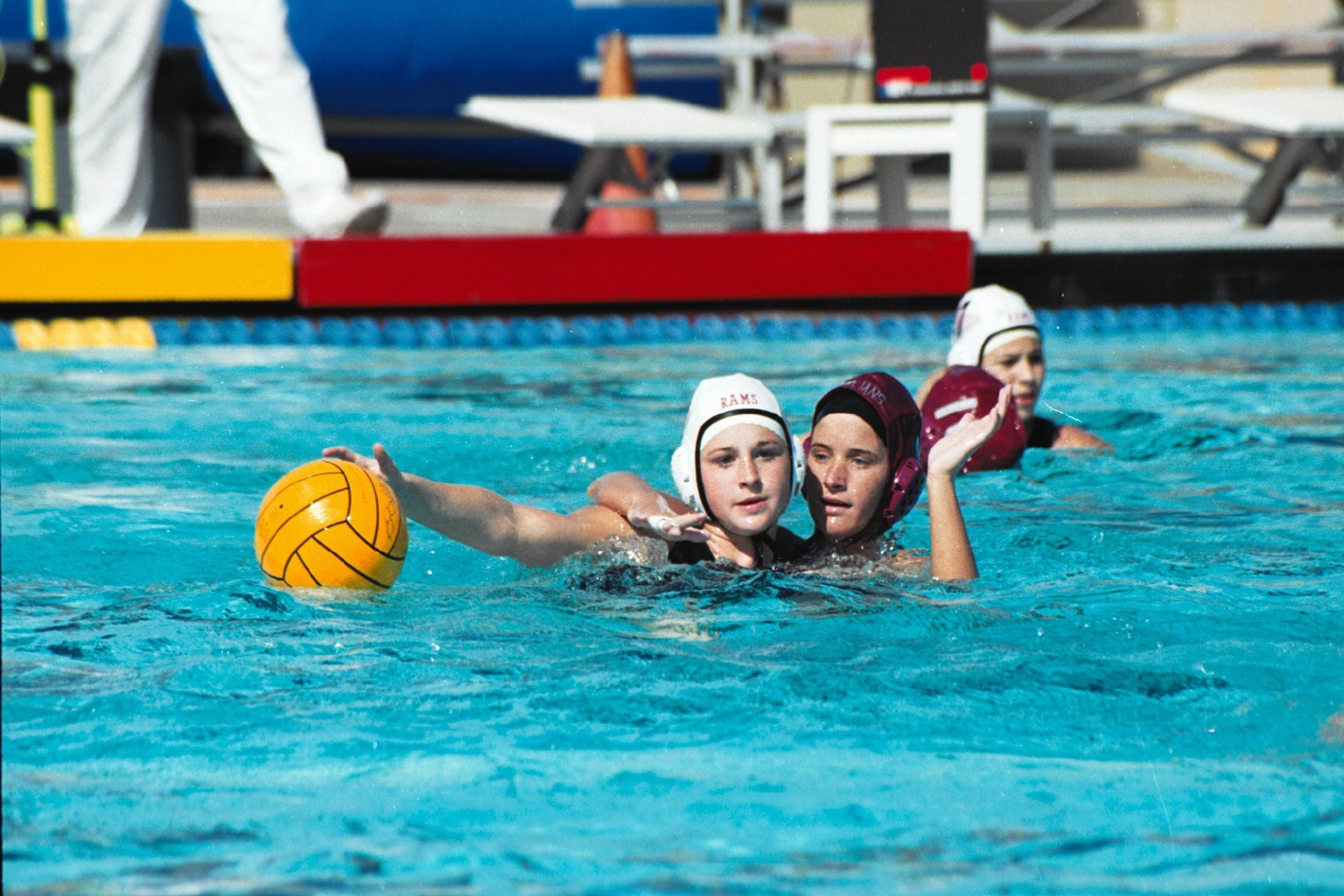
Attacker (white cap) reaches for a wet pass while boxing out her defender

wet pass
A deliberate pass into the water, just out of reach of the intended teammate and their defender. The receiving player can then lunge towards the ball and out of the water to make a shot or pass.
white ball
Shouted to teammates when white cap team has possession.
wing
The position on offense on either side of the center forward, along the 2 meter line. Players at this position may set screens for the drivers, recover rebounds, and shift laterally or toward the half-distance line to spread out the defenders. More generally, the wing is a player or location to either side of the center of the playing area. To move toward the side of the pool to get open for a pass is to wing out.

== Y ==
yellow card
Shown by the referee to indicate that a coach, substitute, or bench personnel has been officially cautioned for misconduct, but may continue participating in the game. If a person receives a second yellow card caution, it has the effect of receiving a red card, and the individual must leave the playing area for the rest of the match. Players out of the water are not show a yellow card in Water Polo.

== Z ==
zone
Defensive arrangement in which players are assigned to defend an area, rather than a specific opponent.

== See also ==
- History of water polo
- List of water polo organizations
- Water polo
