= Michael Evans (water polo) =

American water polo player (born 1960)

Mike Evans
Personal information
- Full name: Michael Scott Evans
- Born: March 26, 1960 (age 66) Fontana, California, U.S.
- Occupations: Coaching, Insurance
- Height: 188 cm (6 ft 2 in)
- Weight: 93 kg (205 lb)
- Spouse: Dina
- Children: 4

Sport
- Sport: Water Polo
- Position: Driver
- College team: University of California, Irvine (1984)
- Club: Newport Foundation WP (1983-1996)
- Coached by: Ted Newland (U. Cal, Irvine)
Medal record
Men's water polo
Representing the United States
Olympic Games
Silver medal – second place	1988 Seoul	Men's water polo

Michael Scott "Evo" Evans (born March 26, 1960) is an American water polo player who competed for the University of California, Irvine and won a silver medal in the 1988 summer Olympics in Seoul, Korea. He later competed for the U.S. Olympic men's water polo teams in the 1992 Barcelona Olympics, and the 1996 Atlanta Olympics.

== Early life ==
Evans was born in Fontana, California, on March 26, 1960. He played water polo for nearby Chaffey High School in Ontario, California from 1974-1978, where he was coached by George Harris. During his years playing water polo for Chaffey High, Evans was named the Citrus Belt League Player of the Year in both 1976 and 1977, and in 1976 set a CIF record of 148 goals scored in a season.

With Evans playing his first year at UC Irvine, having graduated Chaffey High in June, 1978, the Chaffey High Water Polo team won their 30th consecutive Citrus Belt League regular season water polo game on November 8, 1978. Evans had scored a season record of 153 goals during his last year playing for Chaffey High.

== University of California, Irving ==
Evans graduated from the University of California, Irvine in 1984. He played water polo for UC Irvine from 1979 to 1983 under head coach Ted Newland. He was named a collegiate All-American in 1982 and 1983, played in the driver position, and scored 102 goals in 1983. UC Irvine reached the NCAA semifinals in 1981, 1982, and 1983, and won the NCAA national championship in 1982 with Evans as a member of the team.

In team play, from 1983-1996, Evans played for the Newport Foundation.

== 1988-1996 Olympics ==
Representing the U.S. Olympic team, Evan won a team silver medal in the 1988 men's Olympic water polo competition in Seoul, Korea. He also participated in the Water Polo event at the 1992 Olympics in Barcelona, where the U.S. team took an overall fourth place with Italy taking the gold, and Spain taking the Silver. Evans was later on the U.S. mens water polo team in the 1996 Atlanta Olympics, where Hungary and Italy were the heavy pre-game favorites and the U.S. Olympic water Polo team took an overall seventh place. Spain took the gold medal, Croatia took the silver, and Italy took the bronze.

=== International competition ===
Evans was named a U.S. National Water polo team member, where he served from 1985-1996. He was a member of the U.S. National teams that won a gold Medal at the Summer Pan American Games in Indianapolis in 1987 and a silver medal at the Pan American games in Havana, Cuba in 1991. Evans was a member of FINA World Championship teams from 1986-1991, and was a 1988 member of the Goodwill Team.

Evans was a member of the only United States World Cup team in 1991 that won a world championship. He competed with the U.S. National team in Olympic Festivals in 1979, 1990, and 1991.

=== Honors ===
In 2001, he was inducted into the USA Water Polo Hall of Fame. In 2020, he became a member of the U. Cal Irving Hall of Fame.

After ending his elite career in Water Polo, Evans served as a water polo age group coach and referee. In business, he did primarily estate and financial planning for the Cornerstone Benefits Insurance Company which he started on his own.

== See also ==
- UC Irvine Anteaters men's water polo
- List of Olympic medalists in water polo (men)
