= Rick McNair (water polo) =

American water polo player (born 1971)

Personal information
- Full name: Christopher McNair
- Nationality: American
- Born: September 10, 1971 (age 54) Berkeley, California, United States
- Occupations: Model, Investment banker
- Height: 195 cm (6 ft 5 in)
- Weight: 91 kg (201 lb)

Sport
- Sport: Water polo
- College team: Stanford University
- Coached by: Dante Dettamanti (Stanford); Richard Corso (Olympics)

Christopher "Rick" McNair (born September 10, 1971) is an American water polo player who competed for Stanford University. He participated in the men's tournament at the 1996 Atlanta Olympics.

McNair was born September 10, 1971 in Berkeley, California. He attended Stanford University where he competed in water polo under long serving Coach Dante Dettamanti, and earned All-American honors three times.

== 1996 Atlanta Olympics ==
McNair participated with the US water polo team at the 1996 Atlanta Olympics under Head Coach Richard Corso, where the U.S. team placed seventh overall, with Spain taking the gold, Croatia taking the silver, and Italy taking the bronze.

While still a competitor, he worked as a model, and was featured in the Sports Illustrated swimsuit issue in 1994. In the same year, he was featured in an episode of "Baywatch” with several teammates.

After his athletic career, he worked in investment banking, with Peleton Properties as one of his major employers.
