= Wolf Wigo =

American water polo player (born 1973)

Personal information
- Full name: Wolfgang Wigo
- Nickname: Wolf Wigo
- National team: United States
- Born: May 8, 1973 (age 53) Abington, PA
- Education: Stanford University

Sport
- Sport: Water polo
- Rank: All-America collegiate player
- College team: Stanford Cardinal
- Now coaching: University of California, Santa Barbara

Achievements and titles
- National finals: 2 NCAA Championships
Medal record
Men's Water polo
Representing United States
Summer Universiade
Gold medal – first place	1993 Buffalo	Team
Pan American Games
Gold medal – first place	1999 Winnipeg	Team
Gold medal – first place	2003 Santo Domingo	Team
- Updated on 10 August 2023

Wolf Wigo (born May 8, 1973) is an American water polo player and water polo coach. He has played competitive water polo at the national level since age 13. Wigo was a four-year All-America collegiate water polo player and led his Stanford University team to two consecutive NCAA Championships in 1993 and 1994. A member of the U.S. National Polo Team since 1993, Wigo competed in the Olympic Games in 1996, 2000, and 2004. Since 2005, he has been the head coach of the UC Santa Barbara (UCSB) men's water polo program. In 2008 he began coaching the UCSB women's water polo team.

== Early life and education ==
At an early age, Wigo and his sister would travel to a community pool on the West Side in New York City and compete with the Gotham Aqua Kings, having been inspired to swim by his parents who were also swimmers. He was named Swimmer of the Decade at New York's Bronx High School of Science and quickly found success in the activity. Wigo longed for competitive play, however, and soon took up water polo, playing with the St. Francis College Youth Water Polo Club in Brooklyn Heights, New York. At 13 he was the youngest player on the New York Athletic Club (NYAC) team and had earned the Club's prestigious Utzinger Award two years consecutively. Wigo was a National Prep All-American three years in a row. Additionally, while Wigo was still in high school he became a member of the only 17-and-under team from outside California to win the national Junior Olympics in water polo.

=== Stanford University ===
Stanford Cardinal logo

Wigo's college career was plagued by chronic back pain caused by degenerative discs, and he missed substantial parts of his sophomore and junior seasons at Stanford due to his condition. In spite of his back problems, he earned All-American honors in both years. Wigo scored 203 goals from 1991–94 and helped lead the Cardinal to two NCAA championships during his junior and senior seasons. He remains one of only 9 athletes in Stanford's history to be named All-American all four years in college. In 1995, along with swimmer Jenny Thompson, Wolf was named an outstanding senior athlete. He is a 1996 graduate of Stanford with a Bachelor of Arts degree in Political Science.

== Olympics and international play ==
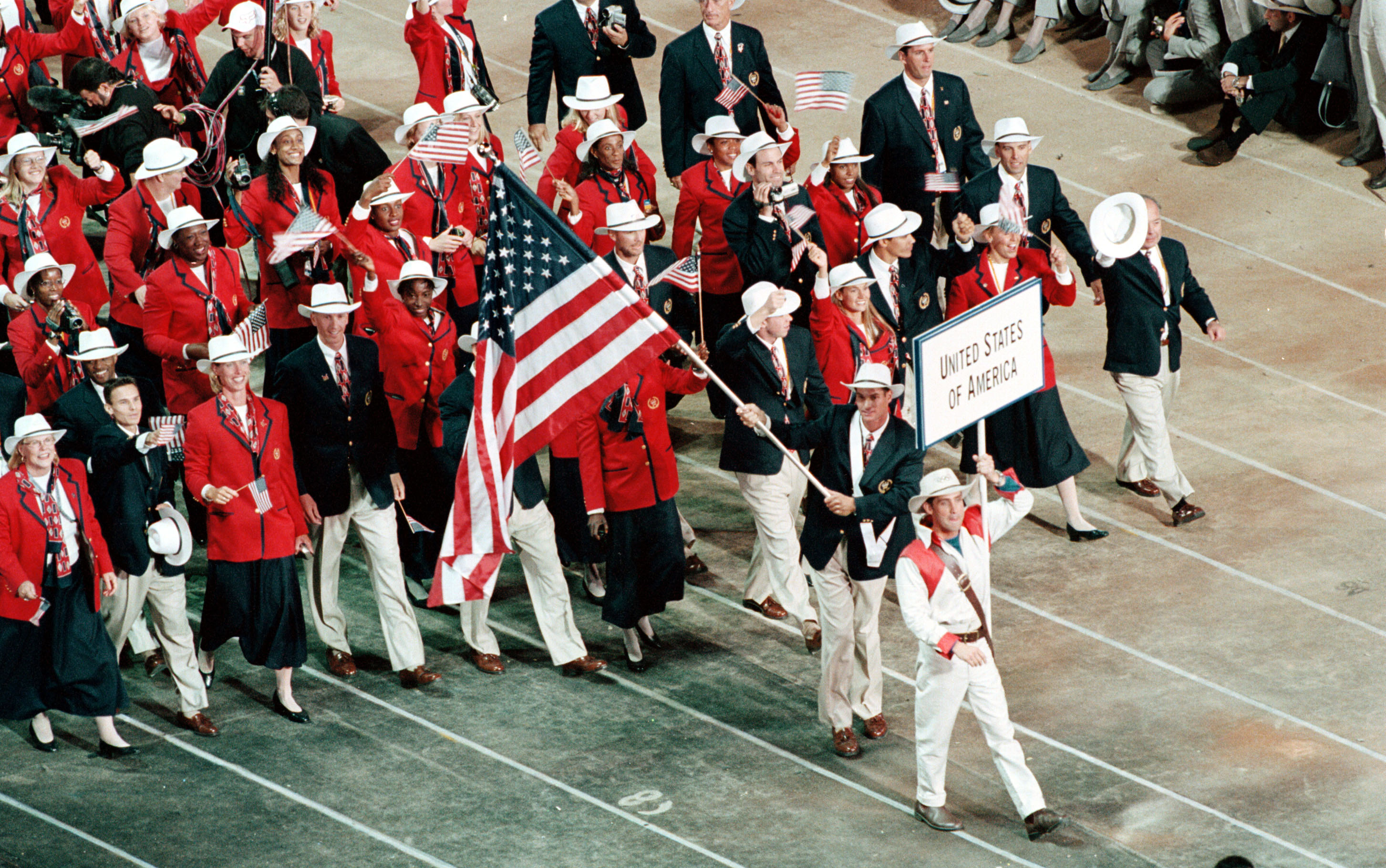
Sydney 2000 US Olympic team

Wigo was chosen for the United States National Water Polo team in 1993. In 1996, he became the first player from east of the Rockies to make the US Olympic team in water polo since 1956. Wigo competed in the Olympic Games in 1996, 2000, and 2004, and was team captain from 2001 to 2004. He led his 2000 Olympic team in Sydney, Australia as the leading scorer, having earned 16 goals. Wigo also helped the U.S. Men's National Team win the 1997 FINA Men's Water Polo World Cup. Between the 2000 and the 2004 Olympics Wolf was a star on the Ethnikos Piraeus team in Athens, Greece. He is still active in USA Water Polo's Premier League, playing for the New York Athletic Club team. He netted 3 goals in the 2006 final game, notching a second consecutive Premier League championship for the NYAC.

Other athletic distinctions include:

- Top US scorer at the 1993 and 1995 World University Games (22 goals in 8 games)
- Leading overall scorer in the 1995 US Olympic festival game
- Leading US scorer at the 1993 Junior World Championships

== Coaching career ==
Wigo served as an assistant water polo coach at Stanford in 1995,1996, and later in 2001 when the Cardinal won the NCAA Championship. He was head coach for the Saddleback El Toro Water Polo Club for two years, and became the UC Santa Barbara men's water polo coach in April 2005, and women's water polo coach in May 2008. Wigo served as an analyst for NBC Sports coverage of water polo at the 2008 and 2012 Summer Olympics. As of 2022, Wigo is the technical director of the Santa Barbara Premier Water Polo Club program.

== Awards and honors ==
- Two year winner of Utzinger Award, the prestigious citation from the NYAC
- Inducted into the NYAC's Hall of Fame
- Four-year AWPCA All-American (1991, 1992, 1993, 1994).
- 1994 NCAA Player of the Year
- American Water Polo Coaches' Association National Scholar-Athlete
- Stanford University Biff Hoffman Award for the school's top senior male athlete.
- Three-time USA Water Polo Male Athlete of the Year (1999, 2000, and 2003)
- First Team All-World by NBC Sports and USA Water Polo (2000)
- Inducted into the USA Water Polo Hall of Fame (2011)

== Personal life ==
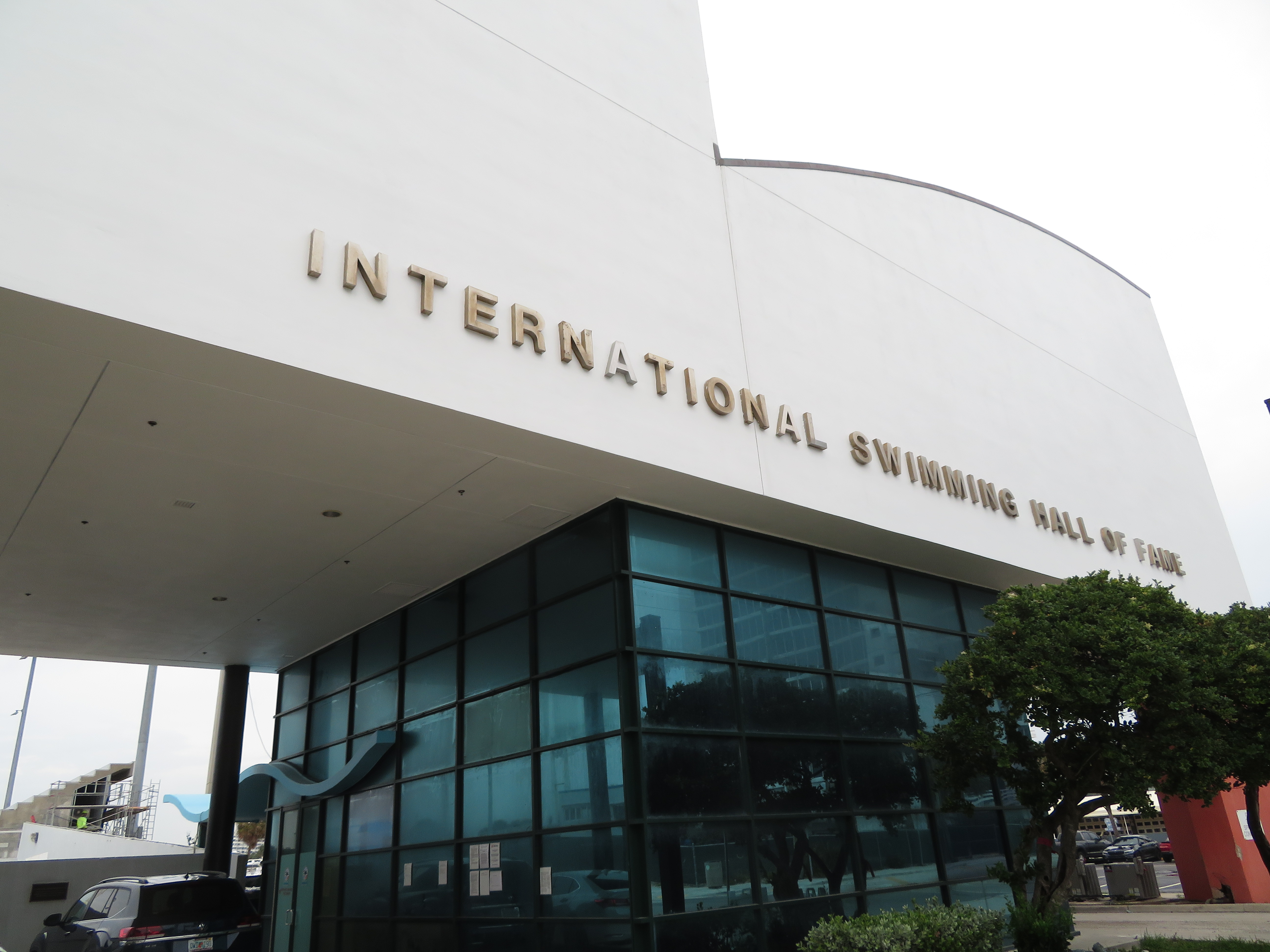
International Swimming Hall of Fame, Fort Lauderdale, Florida - exterior, April 2021

Wigo's given name is Wolfgang, reportedly from a character in James Fenimore Cooper's novel The Heidenmauer. His father, Bruce Wigo, is the former executive director of US Water Polo, and now CEO of the International Swimming Hall of Fame in Ft Lauderdale, Florida. Wolf Wigo's mother, Dawn Young, an actress and filmmaker in New York City, made him the subject of a 2004 award-winning documentary, Beneath The Surface, about his rise in the water polo world to compete in three Olympics.

In December 1998, Wigo was in his father's backyard pool trying to win a bet with his 12-year-old younger twin brothers Drac and Janson that he couldn't swim 20 laps underwater. He blacked out from lack of oxygen because he hyperventilated before he got into the water. His father dived in, pulled him out, and performed CPR, saving his life. The Wigo twins played for Northeast High School in Oakland Park, Florida, reaching the Florida state championship game in 2004 and helping Northeast win the state title in 2005 and 2006. Both brothers signed national letters of intent to play water polo at Stanford in the fall of 2006.

After college, Wigo worked as an equity options trader at the Pacific Stock Exchange in San Francisco (1996–2000). For most of these four years he made trades for Cole Roesler Capital Management until 2:30pm, then went to either Stanford or across the bay to the University of California, Berkeley for his water polo workouts. Every Friday, he would head from the trading floor to the airport, fly south to train with the US National Team all weekend and return home Sunday night.

Wolf and his wife Barbara have a daughter, Athena, born during the 2004 Athens Olympic games.

Wigo is the co-founder of KAP7 International, Inc., a water polo equipment company.

== See also ==
- List of men's Olympic water polo tournament top goal scorers
