= Douglas Kimbell =

American water polo player (born 1960)

Personal information
- Full name: Douglas Burns Kimbell
- Born: June 22, 1960 (age 66) Long Beach, California, U.S.
- Education: Cal State, Long Beach (1982)
- Occupation: Claims specialist
- Height: 205 cm (6 ft 9 in)
- Weight: 104 kg (229 lb)
- Spouse: Darlene Slepcevic Kimbell
- Children: Around 2

Sport
- Sport: Water Polo
- Position: 2-meter guard (Defense)
- College team: UCLA; Santa Ana College; Cal State U. Long Beach
- Club: Industry Hills
- Coached by: Ken Lindgren (Cal State Long Beach); Bill Barnett (Olympics)
Medal record
Men's water polo
Representing the United States
Olympic Games
Silver medal – second place	1988 Seoul	Men's water polo

Douglas Burns "Doug" Kimbell (born June 22, 1960, in Long Beach, California) is a former USA National Team water polo player who earned All-American honors at California State University Long Beach in 1981-2, and later won the silver medal for the United States at the 1988 Summer Olympics in Seoul, South Korea. He was also a member of the USA Water Polo team at the 1992 Summer Olympics, which finished fourth in Barcelona, Spain.

== Early life ==
Kimbell was born June 22, 1960, in Long Beach, California, and graduated from Villa Park High School in 1978, where he won honors as a High School All American in water polo in 1976 and 1977. He had initially been on the basketball team as a Freshman, but as a result of knee problems, switched to Water Polo where he excelled. He still holds many of Villa Park's swimming and water polo scoring records. As their leading scorer, he led the Villa Park Spartans to finish third at the CIF Playoffs for the 3-A Division.

Kimbell was a member of the U.S. National Team from 1980-1995, where one of his primary coaches was Bill Barnett, who like Kimbell, had a career as a water polo player for Long Beach State. Though he was an Olympic prospect for the 1984 Olympics, Kimbell would not gain enough experience to qualify for the U.S. Olympic team until the 1988 Olympics. In Club play, Kimbell played for Industry Hill and the Hackers Water Polo Club in greater Long Beach, and may have stepped in to coach the Hackers.

== Collegiate era ==
He attended University of California Los Angeles briefly on an athletic scholarship for water polo, though he got little playing time on their team whose upperclassmen were more talented and experienced. He then transferred to Santa Ana College (SAC), where he had led the team in water polo goals in one of his seasons. He finished his College career at California State University, Long Beach (CSULB) where he played for Coach Ken Lindgren, and finished out his water polo eligibility for a single season from 1981 though 1982, where he was an All-American both years. Long Beach State Coach Ken Lindgren considered Kimbell his best player on defense, and was the team's second leading scorer as of October, 1981. At Long Beach State, he was a Most Valuable Player in the Pacific Coast Athletic Association, and led the team to a second place finish in the NCAA National Championship. Graduating around 1982, he was a marketing major at Long Beach State, and maintained a 3.0 grade point average through his Senior year.

== 1988-1992 Olympics ==
=== 1988 Seoul Olympic silver medal ===
Kimbell participated with the U.S. Water Polo team that won the silver medal for the United States at the 1988 Summer Olympics in Seoul, South Korea, where he was coached by USA Water Polo Hall of Fame Coach Bill Barnett. Yugoslavia was a strong early favorite, though the U.S. had beaten the Yugoslavian team five of eight times in matches prior to the Olympics. In group play, Yugoslavia and the United States met in their first Olympic match, with the U.S. team defeating Yugoslavia 7-6. However, as Yugoslavia had been the winner of the group competition, while the U.S. team lost to Spain 9-7 in group competition, Yugoslavia progressed to the final round despite having lost the U.S. team in early rounds. Both the U.S. team and Yugoslavia progressed to the semi-final round, and each won their first semi-final match. In the U.S. team's first semi-final match, Kimbell scored a goal against the Soviet Union, helping to lead the team to a 8-7 victory which put them in the final match against Yugoslavia. In the long and close final match, the U.S. had a 5-2 third quarter lead. Yugoslavia scored four consecutive goals to bring the score to 6-5, but the U.S. team soon brought the score to a 6-6 tie. In overtime, the Yugoslavian team scored three additional goals to take a 9-6 lead, and at the game end won by a score of 9-7, taking the gold medal. As second place finishers in the final round, the U.S. team took the silver. The Soviet Union took the bronze medal.

=== 1992 Barcelona Olympics ===
Kimbell was also a member of the USA Water Polo team at the 1992 Summer Olympics, which finished fourth in Barcelona, Spain. Italy took the gold medal in what would become the longest water polo match in Olympic history, defeating Spain 9-8 at the end of six overtimes. Spain took the silver, and the Unified team took the bronze.

In international competition, he played with the U.S. National team at the World Championships in both 1991 and 1994. He participated in Water Polo at the Pan American Games, winning a silver medal in 1991 and a gold in 1995.

=== Honors ===
Kimbell is a member of the Athletic Hall of Fame for both California State University Long Beach and Santa Ana College, though he had little playing time during his brief career at UCLA. In 2000, Kimbell was inducted into the USA Water Polo Hall of Fame.

Kimbell is married to Darlene Slepcevic Kimbell. He is father to son Jackson, born in 1994, and daughter McKenna, born in 2008.

Kimbell later worked as a claims specialist in the Los Angeles area.

== See also ==
- List of Olympic medalists in water polo (men)
