= Jeremy Laster =

American water polo player (born 1974)

Personal information
- Full name: Jeremy Todd Laster
- Born: February 24, 1974 (age 52) Fullerton, California, United States
- Occupation(s): High School Water Polo Coach; Real Estate executive
- Height: 195 cm (6 ft 5 in)
- Weight: 91 kg (201 lb)
- Spouse: Frandy
- Children: 6

Sport
- Sport: Water polo
- College team: Stanford University; B.A. Economics ('96)
- Club: Harvard WP Foundation
- Coached by: Steve Yancy (San Clemente High); Dante Dettamanti (Stanford); Richard Corso ('96 Olympics)
Medal record
Representing United States
Pan American Games
Gold medal – first place	1995 Mar del Plata	Team competition

Jeremy Todd Laster (born February 24, 1974) is an American water polo player who competed for Stanford. He participated in the men's tournament at the 1996 Summer Olympics. He has worked as a high school water polo coach and as CEO and President of the Real Estate Company Rancho Mission Viejo. He has served on the boards of several community youth, high school, and hospital foundations as well as on the board of USA water polo.

== Early life ==
Laster was born February 24, 1974 in Fullerton, California. He attended San Clemente High School, where as a Senior in 1991, coached by Steve Yancy, he led the water polo team to the CIF Southern Section 4A title. In the 4A Southern Section Championship quarterfinal, San Clemente defeated the water polo team from Corona de Mar High School, the nation's top rated team, with Laster scoring 5 goals in San Clemente's close 14-13 overtime victory. San Clemente later won the championship by a score of 9-5 against Capistrano Valley High School.

Laster was San Clemente's all time leading career scorer in water polo, with a three season total of 220 goals and was a CIF and Orange County Player of the Year . At San Clemente, he usually played defense as a two-meter defender handling the opposing team's center, and on offense usually played driver, a perimeter player. In scholastics, he maintained a 3.8 grade point average and was a National Merit Scholar finalist. In his High School Senior year, he trained with his Uncle Don Laster, a High School water polo and swimming coach, in preparation for a competition in Calgary, Canada with the U.S. Jr. National team.

== Stanford University ==
Graduating with a B.A. in Economics in 1996, Laster attended Stanford University, where he was coached in water polo by Dante Dettamanti, who headed Stanford's water polo program from 1977-2002. Laster received All American honors in three years, and as part of a strong nationally recognized team, helped lead Stanford to two NCAA national championships. He was recognized as most Outstanding Male Athlete at Stanford as a recipient of the school's exclusive Block “S” Award in 1995, was an NCAA Most Valuable Player, and as a well-round athlete was an All American in Academics.

Laster married wife Frandy, and the couple had six children. Jeremy's oldest son Anthony also played water polo for Stanford in the driver position, with his first year in 2021.

== 1996 Atlanta Olympics ==
Laster participated in the 1996 Atlanta Olympics, under Head Coach Richard Corso, a USA Hall of Fame inductee, where the US team placed seventh overall among 12 competing countries. One of Laster's Olympic team mates was Chris Oeding, the second highest scorer on the US Olympic team. Though Hungary and Italy were the strong pre-Olympic favorites, Spain defeated Hungary 7-6 in the semi-finals. In the final game Spain beat Croatia, and captured the gold medal with a score of 7-5, leaving Croatia the silver medal, and pre-game favorite Italy the bronze.

=== International highlights ===
In non-Olympic competition, he won a gold medal in the Pan American water polo team competition with the U.S. National team at the Pan American games in Mar del Plata in 1995. In both 1994 and 1998 he was part of the US National teams that won the FINA World Championships, and was a 1997 FINA Cup Gold Medalist.

== Careers ==
In professional water polo, in 1997 he played for Xios, a Greek team.

=== Coaching ===
As a side career, Laster has coached water polo for high schools and age group youth. Laster briefly coached the Stanford’s women’s water polo team, coached Menlo Park's Menlo School, and coached the 14 and under age group team for the Orange County Water Polo Club. Around 2016, he served as a varsity water polo coach for Santa Margarita Catholic High School where his son attended and competed in the sport.

=== Real estate executive ===
Laster has served as CEO and President of the Real Estate Company Rancho Mission Viejo, initially joining the company in 2001. In his position, he oversees planned community development projects, land management, as well as properties intended for commercial use. He was based for a period in San Juan Capistrano. He had worked as an Executive Vice-President and a Director of Asset Management at Rancho Mission Viejo before assuming the role of President. In a former position, he worked as an Associate at Economic Research Associates.

=== Service to the community ===
In community service, Laster has been active with the Community Board at Providence Mission Hospital, and directs the Santa Margarita Catholic High School Eagle Foundation. He has been a board member of the Orange County Youth Sports Foundation, of USA Water Polo and of the Real Estate Professionals of Stanford.
