= Chris Oeding =

American water polo player (born 1971)

Personal information
- Full name: Chris M. Oeding
- Born: September 10, 1971 (age 54) Santa Ana, California, United States
- Occupation: Water Polo Coach
- Height: 185 cm (6 ft 1 in)
- Weight: 83 kg (183 lb)

Sport
- Sport: Water polo
- College team: University of California Berkeley
- Coached by: John Vargas (Corona del Mar High); Steve Heaston (UC Berkeley); Richard Corso (1996 Olympics); John Vargas (2000 Olympics)
Medal record
Representing United States
Pan American Games
Gold medal – first place	1995 Mar del Plata	Team competition

Christopher Oeding (born September 10, 1971) is a former American water polo player and a more recent coach, who competed for the University of California Berkeley, and participated in the men's water polo tournament at the 1996 Summer Olympics in Atlanta and the 2000 Summer Olympics in Sydney. Oeding later had a career as a water polo coach, first at Orange Coast College and then served as the water polo coach at Long Beach City College beginning in 2000, where he led the team to seven state championships through 2025. He has worked as a Women's U.S. National team Assistant coach, and served as a coach to the women's team at the 2016 Olympics in Rio de Jainero where they won the gold medal, at the 2020 Olympics in Tokyo where they won another gold, and at the 2024 Paris Olympics where the women's team placed fourth.

== Early life ==
Oeding was born September 10, 1971 in Santa Ana, California. Graduating in 1989, he attended Corona del Mar High School, where he earned All American honors in water polo in three years, and helped lead the team to the California Interscholastic Federation (CIF) Championships in two years. While a player at the very strong water polo program at Corona del Mar, Oeding played for Coach John Vargas, a 1992 Water Polo Olympian who would later coach him in the 2000 Olympics.

Oeding earned honors as the CIF's Player of the year in 1988, leading Corona del Mar in scoring that year. Chris originally competed in swimming before taking up water polo, becoming a starter in his High School Sophomore year. Chris's brother Jeff, who played for Stanford and may have inspired Chris to pursue the sport, also played water polo for Corona del Mar, and helped lead the team to the CIF Southern Section championship finals in 1984. During Chris's tenure with the team, the Corona del Mar High School team won the CIF Southern Section 4A Championship in both 1987 and 1988, with Chris scoring critical goals in both games. In 1988, Oeding was a Los Angeles Times Player of the Year, and a High School Water Polo First Team honoree. In 1988, was also recognized as a CIF All-Southern Section honoree for his second consecutive year, and considered by several water polo coaches to be one of the nation's top players.

== University of California Berkeley ==
Coached and trained by Head Coach Steve Heaston, Oeding attended and played water polo for the University of California Berkeley on a scholarship, where he helped lead the team to a remarkable three successive national Championships from 1990-1992 at the National Collegiate Athletic Association championships. Oeding's 1992 water polo squad finished the year with an unbeaten 31-0 season record.

Oeding trained and competed with the U.S. Senior National Team from around 1993-2001, where one of his coaches was former Long Beach City College Coach Monte Nitzkowski, who had also served as an Olympic coach.

In non-Olympic international competition, Oeding played on the US water polo team that won the gold at the 1995 Pan American Games in 1995 Olympic water polo competition in Mara del Plata, Buenos Aires, Argentina, and won another gold at the 1999 Pan American Games in Winnipeg, Canada. In a career highlight, he captained the U.S. National team that won the gold medal at the 1997 World Cup in Athens, Greece.

== Olympics ==
=== 1996 Atlanta Olympics ===
Oeding participated in the 1996 Atlanta Olympics, under Head Coach Richard Corso where the US team placed seventh overall among 12 competing countries. A standout player, Oeding was the second highest scorer on the U.S. Olympic team, and his 11 goals for 23 shots was the highest goal per shots taken, at 48 percent was the highest on the US team. Though Hungary and Italy were the strong pre-Olympic favorites, Spain defeated Hungary 7-6 in the semi-finals. In the final game Spain beat Croatia, and captured the gold medal with a score of 7-5, leaving Croatia the silver medal, and pre-game favorite Italy the bronze.

=== 2000 Sydney Olympics ===
Oeding played for the United States Water Polo Team serving as a team captain under Olympic Coach John Vargas in the 2000 Sydney Olympics, where he helped to lead the team to an overall sixth-place finish among twelve competing countries. Chris primarily played in the driver position during the 2000 Olympics. In preliminary rounds, the US team defeated the Netherlands and Croatia, both traditionally strong teams, but lost their last match in the final round 10–8 to Italy. Perennial pre-game favorite Hungary took the gold medal, Russia took the silver, and the historically dominant team from Yugoslavia took the bronze, having had more total goals than the United States. Hungary easily defeated rival Russia in the final game by a score of 13-6, leading in each of the first three periods by a score of 3-1, 8-2, and 10-4.

== Honors ==
He was inducted into the USA Water Polo Hall of Fame in 2024 for his accomplishments both as a coach and athlete.

== Coaching ==
While still a competitive water polo player, Oeding became a water polo and swimming coach, working first for five years at Orange Coast College where he led the team to Orange Coast conference titles in both 1999 and 1997. He has had his primary career of over twenty years at Long Beach City College (LBCC) since beginning his career there in 2000. At Long Beach City College, Oeding and Assistant Coach Dave Kasa led the LBCC Vikings to seven state championships through 2015. His men's squads won state titles in 2005, 2006, 2013 and 2015 while his women's teams were state champs in 2003, 2004, and 2006.

=== National women's team coach ===
In a noteworthy honor and achievement, he served as the U.S. Woman's National Team Assistant water polo coach where he helped direct the US women to a 2016 Rio de Janeiro Olympic gold medal. In 2021, he led the women's national water polo team to a Gold medal at the 2021 Tokyo Olympics, and helped lead the women's team to a fourth place finish at the Paris Olympics in 2024.
