= United States men's Olympic water polo team records and statistics =

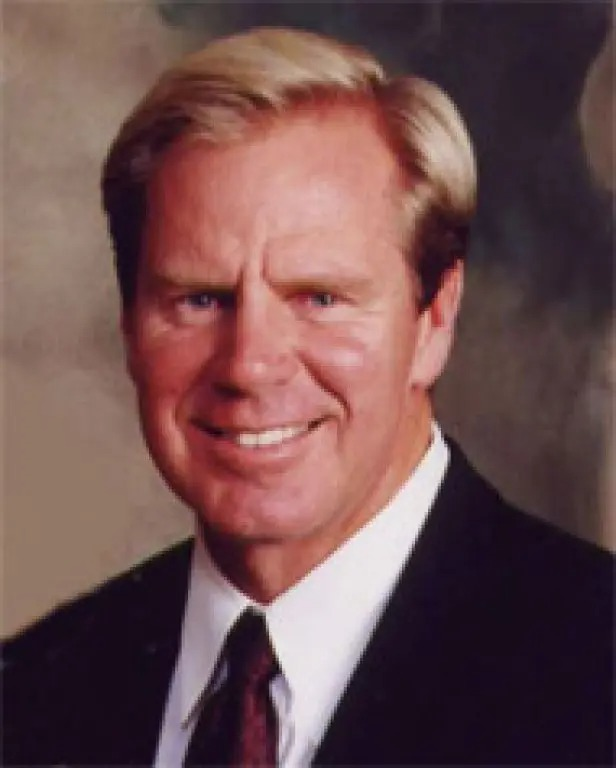
Terry Schroeder is the first and only American (man or woman) to have won medals in the Olympic water polo tournaments both as a player and as a head coach.

This article contains lists of various statistics on the United States men's national water polo team at the Summer Olympics. The lists are updated as of March 30, 2020.

== Abbreviations ==
No.	Cap number	Rk	Rank	App	Appearance	Ref	Reference
(C)	Captain	H	Handedness	L	Left-handed	R	Right-handed
Pos	Playing position	FP	Field player	GK	Goalkeeper		
CB	Center back (2-meter defense)	CF	Center forward (2-meter offense)	D	Driver (attacker)	U	Utility (except goalkeeper)
G	Goals	TG	Total goals	G/M	Goals per match		
MC	Matches coached	MP	Matches played	TMP	Total matches played		

== Basics ==
Men's water polo tournaments have been staged at the Olympic Games since 1900. The United States has participated in 22 of 27 tournaments. The United States team is the only non-European squad to win medals in the men's Olympic water polo tournament.

Best results:

- 1st place ( (gold) Gold medal):
  - (United States) 1904 St. Louis
- 2nd place ( (silver) Silver medal):
  - (United States) 1904 St. Louis
  - (United States) 1984 Los Angeles
  - (South Korea) 1988 Seoul
  - (China) 2008 Beijing
- 3rd place ( (bronze) Bronze medal):
  - (United States) 1904 St. Louis
  - (France) 1924 Paris
  - (United States) 1932 Los Angeles
  - (West Germany) 1972 Munich

Latest medal:

- (silver) Silver medal (2nd place): (China) 2008 Beijing

== Team ==
=== Results ===
==== By tournament ====
The following table shows results of the United States men's national water polo team at the Olympic Games by tournament.

Games	MP	W	D	L	GF	GA	GD	Win %	Finish	Ref
(France) 1900 Paris	Did not participate									
(United States) 1904 St. Louis	See Water polo at the 1904 Summer Olympics									
(United Kingdom) 1908 London	Did not participate									
(Sweden) 1912 Stockholm	Did not participate									
(Belgium) 1920 Antwerp	5	2	0	3	18	19	-1	40.00%	4th of 12	
(France) 1924 Paris	5	2	0	3	10	11	-1	40.00%	**3rd** of 13	
(Netherlands) 1928 Amsterdam	3	1	0	2	11	7	+4	33.33%	7th of 14	
(United States) 1932 Los Angeles	4	2	1	1	20	12	+8	50.00%	**3rd** of 5	
(Germany) 1936 Berlin	3	1	0	2	7	8	-1	33.33%	9th of 16	
(United Kingdom) 1948 London	3	1	1	1	11	11	0	33.33%	11th of 18	
(Finland) 1952 Helsinki	9	5	0	4	35	31	+4	55.56%	4th of 21	
(Australia) 1956 Melbourne	6	2	0	4	15	23	-8	33.33%	5th of 10	
(Italy) 1960 Rome	7	3	0	4	33	35	-2	42.86%	7th of 16	
(Japan) 1964 Tokyo	3	1	0	2	12	9	+3	33.33%	9th of 13	
1968 Mexico City	8	5	1	2	49	43	+6	62.50%	5th of 15	
(West Germany) 1972 Munich	9	6	2	1	50	38	+12	66.67%	**3rd** of 16	
(Canada) 1976 Montreal	Did not qualify									
(Soviet Union) 1980 Moscow	Qualified but withdrew									
(United States) 1984 Los Angeles	7	6	1	0	65	43	+22	85.71%	**2nd** of 12	
(South Korea) 1988 Seoul	7	5	0	2	71	56	+15	71.43%	**2nd** of 12	
(Spain) 1992 Barcelona	7	4	0	3	48	38	+10	57.14%	4th of 12	
(United States) 1996 Atlanta	8	5	0	3	67	57	+10	62.50%	7th of 12	
(Australia) 2000 Sydney	8	3	0	5	69	68	+1	37.50%	6th of 12	
(Greece) 2004 Athens	7	4	0	3	47	50	-3	57.14%	7th of 12	
(China) 2008 Beijing	7	5	0	2	57	50	+7	71.43%	**2nd** of 12	
(United Kingdom) 2012 London	8	3	0	5	61	70	-9	37.50%	8th of 12	
(Brazil) 2016 Rio de Janeiro	5	2	0	3	35	35	0	40.00%	10th of 12	
Total	129	68	6	55	791	714	+77	52.71%		
Games	MP	W	D	L	GF	GA	GD	Win %	Finish	Ref

==== Historical progression – best finish ====
The following table shows the historical progression of the best finish at the Olympic Games, excluding the medal sweep by U.S. teams at the 1904 St. Louis Olympics.

Best finish	Achievement	Games	Date	Duration of record	Ref
4th	**Set record**	(Belgium) 1920 Antwerp	Aug 29, 1920	3 years, 326 days	
3rd	**Broke record**	(France) 1924 Paris	Jul 20, 1924	60 years, 21 days	
3rd	Tied record	(United States) 1932 Los Angeles	Aug 13, 1932	60 years, 21 days	
3rd	Tied record	(West Germany) 1972 Munich	Sep 4, 1972	60 years, 21 days	
2nd	**Broke record**	(United States) 1984 Los Angeles	Aug 10, 1984	42 years, 52 days	
2nd	Tied record	(South Korea) 1988 Seoul	Oct 1, 1988	42 years, 52 days	
2nd	Tied record	(China) 2008 Beijing	Aug 24, 2008	42 years, 52 days	

==== By opponent ====
The following tables show results of the United States men's national water polo team at the Olympic Games by opponent.

Continent	Medals	First	Latest	MP	W	D	L	GF	GA	GD	Win %	Confederation
Teams from Americas	0	1936	1984	10	9	1	0	70	30	+40	90.00%	ASUA
Teams from Asia	0	1932	2008	4	4	0	0	41	17	+24	100.00%	AASF
Teams from Europe	73	1920	2016	111	52	5	54	645	641	+4	46.85%	LEN
Teams from Oceania	0	1984	2012	4	3	0	1	35	26	+9	75.00%	OSA
Total	73	1920	2016	129	68	6	55	791	714	+77	52.71%	

Team	Medals	First	Latest	MP	W	D	L	GF	GA	GD	Win %	Confederation
Australia	0	1984	2012	4	3	0	1	35	26	+9	75.00%	OSA
Austria	0	1952	1952	1	1	0	0	4	1	+3	100.00%	LEN
**Belgium**^{^}	6	1920	1932	7	2	1	4	20	23	-3	28.57%	LEN
Brazil	0	1964	1984	4	4	0	0	33	11	+22	100.00%	ASUA
Canada	0	1972	1972	1	1	0	0	8	1	+7	100.00%	ASUA
China	0	1988	2008	2	2	0	0	22	11	+11	100.00%	AASF
**Croatia**^{^}	3	1996	2016	7	4	0	3	47	52	-5	57.14%	LEN
Cuba	0	1968	1972	2	1	1	0	13	12	+1	50.00%	ASUA
Czechoslovakia^{†}	0	1992	1992	1	1	0	0	9	3	+6	100.00%	LEN
East Germany^{†}	0	1968	1968	1	1	0	0	6	4	+2	100.00%	LEN
**France**^{^}	4	1924	2016	5	3	0	2	29	19	+10	60.00%	LEN
**Germany**^{^}	3	1932	2008	5	3	1	1	26	20	+6	60.00%	LEN
**Great Britain**^{^}	4	1920	2012	4	3	0	1	28	20	+8	75.00%	LEN
Greece	0	1920	2000	6	5	0	1	61	31	+30	83.33%	LEN
**Hungary**^{^}	15	1928	2012	12	1	0	11	48	90	-42	8.33%	LEN
**Italy**^{^}	8	1952	2016	8	4	0	4	58	59	-1	50.00%	LEN
Japan	0	1932	1932	1	1	0	0	10	0	+10	100.00%	AASF
Kazakhstan	0	2004	2004	1	1	0	0	9	6	+3	100.00%	AASF
Malta	0	1928	1928	1	1	0	0	10	0	+10	100.00%	LEN
Mexico	0	1972	1972	1	1	0	0	7	5	+2	100.00%	ASUA
Montenegro	0	2012	2016	2	1	0	1	13	15	-2	50.00%	LEN
**Netherlands**^{^}	2	1924	2000	7	5	0	2	43	35	+8	71.43%	LEN
Romania	0	1952	2012	5	4	0	1	34	25	+9	80.00%	LEN
**Russia**^{^}	2	2000	2004	2	0	0	2	17	20	-3	0.00%	LEN
**Serbia**^{^}	3	2008	2012	3	1	0	2	18	20	-2	33.33%	LEN
**Serbia and Montenegro**^{^†}	1	1996	2004	3	1	0	2	21	25	-4	33.33%	LEN
**Soviet Union**^{^†}	7	1956	1988	4	1	1	2	18	24	-6	25.00%	LEN
**Spain**^{^}	2	1920	2016	9	4	0	5	62	57	+5	44.44%	LEN
**Sweden**^{^}	3	1920	1952	4	1	0	3	6	19	-13	25.00%	LEN
Ukraine	0	1996	1996	1	1	0	0	9	7	+2	100.00%	LEN
**Unified Team**^{^†}	1	1992	1992	2	0	0	2	9	16	-7	0.00%	LEN
Uruguay	0	1936	1948	2	2	0	0	9	1	+8	100.00%	ASUA
**West Germany**^{^†}	1	1968	1984	3	2	1	0	19	16	+3	66.67%	LEN
**Yugoslavia**^{^†}	8	1952	1988	8	2	1	5	30	40	-10	25.00%	LEN
Total	73	1920	2016	129	68	6	55	791	714	+77	52.71%	
Team	Medals	First	Latest	MP	W	D	L	GF	GA	GD	Win %	Confederation

^{^}Teams that have won at least one Olympic medal are shown in bold.
^{†}Defunct teams are shown in italic.

==== Victories, ties and defeats ====
- Biggest victory in an Olympic match
  - **10–0** vs. Malta, Aug 8, 1928
  - **10–0** vs. Japan, Aug 7, 1932
- Heaviest defeat in an Olympic match
  - **0–7** vs. Hungary, Aug 11, 1932
  - **0–7** vs. Sweden, Aug 3, 1948
- Most victories in an Olympic tournament
  - **6**, 1972 Summer Olympics
  - **6**, 1984 Summer Olympics
- Most matches without defeat in an Olympic tournament
  - **8**, 1972 Summer Olympics
- Most defeats in an Olympic tournament
  - **5**, 2000 Summer Olympics
  - **5**, 2012 Summer Olympics
- Most matches without victory in an Olympic tournament
  - **5**, 2000 Summer Olympics
  - **5**, 2012 Summer Olympics
- Most ties in an Olympic tournament
  - **2**, 1972 Summer Olympics
- Most matches without a tie in an Olympic tournament
  - **9**, 1952 Summer Olympics

==== Goals for and against ====
- Most goals for in an Olympic match
  - **18**–9 vs. Greece, Sep 26, 1988
- Least goals for in an Olympic match
  - **0**–5 vs. Hungary, Aug 6, 1928
  - **0**–7 vs. Hungary, Aug 11, 1932
  - **0**–7 vs. Sweden, Aug 3, 1948
  - **0**–4 vs. Hungary, Aug 2, 1952
- Most goals against in an Olympic match
  - 10–**14** vs. Hungary, Aug 24, 2008
- Least goals against in an Olympic match
  - 7–**0** vs. Greece, Aug 24, 1920
  - 5–**0** vs. Spain, Aug 28, 1920
  - 10–**0** vs. Malta, Aug 8, 1928
  - 10–**0** vs. Japan, Aug 7, 1932
  - 7–**0** vs. Uruguay, Jul 30, 1948
- Most matches scoring in an Olympic tournament
  - **9**, 1972 Summer Olympics
- Most matches without scoring in an Olympic tournament
  - **1**, 1928 Summer Olympics
  - **1**, 1932 Summer Olympics
  - **1**, 1948 Summer Olympics
  - **1**, 1952 Summer Olympics
- Most matches conceding a goal in an Olympic tournament
  - **9**, 1952 Summer Olympics
  - **9**, 1972 Summer Olympics

=== Rosters ===
==== Number of competitors and average age, height & weight ====
The following table shows number of competitors and average age, height & weight at the Olympic Games by tournament.

Games	Competitors	Returning Olympians		Average			Finish	Ref
Games	Number	Number	%	Age	Height	Weight	Finish	Ref
(Belgium) 1920 Antwerp	11	0	0.00%	26 years, 77 days			4th of 12	
(France) 1924 Paris	11	1	9.09%	25 years, 72 days (Note: Average age of 10 competitors.)			**3rd** of 13	
(Netherlands) 1928 Amsterdam	11	4	36.36%	25 years, 364 days (Note: Average age of 9 competitors.)			7th of 14	
(United States) 1932 Los Angeles	7 (Note: Only 7 players competed in this tournament. They were all listed in page 607, 629, 630, 631, 632 and 633 of the Official Report of the 1932 Olympic Games (page 623, 646, 647, 648, 649 and 650 of the PDF document). The official report of the International Olympic Committee did not count other reserves or alternates as competitors or medalists.)	1	14.29%	26 years, 220 days			**3rd** of 5	
(Germany) 1936 Berlin	9 (Note: Only 9 players competed in this tournament. They were all listed in page 984 of the Official Report of the 1936 Olympic Games (page 345 of the PDF document). The official report of the International Olympic Committee did not count other reserves or alternates as competitors.)	6	66.67%	29 years, 183 days			9th of 16	
(United Kingdom) 1948 London	8 (Note: Only 8 players competed in this tournament. They were all listed in page 470 and 472 of the Official Report of the 1948 Olympic Games (page 642 and 644 of the PDF document). The official report of the International Olympic Committee did not count other reserves or alternates as competitors.)	2	25.00%	31 years, 185 days			11th of 18	
(Finland) 1952 Helsinki	10 (Note: Only 10 players competed in this tournament. They were all listed in page 599, 600, 603, 604 and 605 of the Official Report of the 1952 Olympic Games (page 602, 603, 606, 607 and 608 of the PDF document). The official report of the International Olympic Committee did not count other reserves or alternates as competitors.)	0	0.00%	22 years, 77 days			4th of 21	
(Australia) 1956 Melbourne	10 (Note: Only 10 players competed in this tournament. They were all listed in page 623 and 624 of the Official Report of the 1956 Olympic Games (page 625 and 626 of the PDF document). The official report of the International Olympic Committee did not count other reserves or alternates as competitors.)	2	20.00%	25 years, 230 days	6 ft 1 in (1.85 m)	182 lb (83 kg)	5th of 10	
(Italy) 1960 Rome	10 (Note: Only 10 players competed in this tournament. They were all listed in page 615, 616, 619, 620 and 623 of the Official Report of the 1960 Olympic Games (page 624, 625, 628, 629 and 632 of the PDF document). The official report of the International Olympic Committee did not count other reserves or alternates as competitors.)	4	40.00%	24 years, 361 days	5 ft 11.5 in (1.82 m)	176 lb (80 kg)	7th of 16	
(Japan) 1964 Tokyo	11	2	18.18%	23 years, 204 days	6 ft 0 in (1.83 m)	174 lb (79 kg)	9th of 13	
1968 Mexico City	11	4	36.36%	24 years, 187 days	6 ft 0.5 in (1.84 m)	184 lb (83 kg)	5th of 15	
(West Germany) 1972 Munich	11	7	63.64%	25 years, 152 days	6 ft 1 in (1.85 m)	188 lb (85 kg)	**3rd** of 16	
(United States) 1984 Los Angeles	13	0	0.00%	27 years, 188 days	6 ft 2 in (1.88 m)	192 lb (87 kg)	**2nd** of 12	
(South Korea) 1988 Seoul	13	5	38.46%	27 years, 345 days	6 ft 2.5 in (1.89 m)	201 lb (91 kg)	**2nd** of 12	
(Spain) 1992 Barcelona	13	7	53.85%	28 years, 348 days	6 ft 3.5 in (1.92 m)	203 lb (92 kg)	4th of 12	
(United States) 1996 Atlanta	13	5	38.46%	27 years, 24 days	6 ft 3.5 in (1.92 m)	203 lb (92 kg)	7th of 12	
(Australia) 2000 Sydney	13	6	46.15%	27 years, 353 days	6 ft 3.5 in (1.92 m)	205 lb (93 kg)	6th of 12	
(Greece) 2004 Athens	13	3	23.08%	25 years, 359 days	6 ft 3.5 in (1.92 m)	211 lb (96 kg)	7th of 12	
(China) 2008 Beijing	13	7	53.85%	27 years, 186 days	6 ft 4 in (1.93 m)	218 lb (99 kg)	**2nd** of 12	
(United Kingdom) 2012 London	13	10	76.92%	30 years, 316 days	6 ft 4.5 in (1.94 m)	220 lb (100 kg)	8th of 12	
(Brazil) 2016 Rio de Janeiro	13	4	30.77%	25 years, 251 days	6 ft 4.5 in (1.94 m)	220 lb (100 kg)	10th of 12	
Games	Number	Number	%	Age	Height	Weight	Finish	Ref
Games	Competitors	Returning Olympians		Average			Finish	Ref

==== Historical progression – returning Olympians ====
The following table shows the historical progression of the record of returning Olympians.

Returning Olympians	Achievement	Games	Date	Duration of record	Ref
0	**Set record**	(Belgium) 1920 Antwerp	Aug 24, 1920	3 years, 324 days	
1	**Broke record**	(France) 1924 Paris	Jul 13, 1924	4 years, 24 days	
4	**Broke record**	(Netherlands) 1928 Amsterdam	Aug 6, 1928	8 years, 2 days	
6	**Broke record**	(Germany) 1936 Berlin	Aug 8, 1936	36 years, 19 days	
7	**Broke record**	(West Germany) 1972 Munich	Aug 27, 1972	39 years, 337 days	
7	Tied record	(Spain) 1992 Barcelona	Aug 1, 1992	39 years, 337 days	
7	Tied record	(China) 2008 Beijing	Aug 10, 2008	39 years, 337 days	
10	**Broke record**	(United Kingdom) 2012 London	Jul 29, 2012	14 years, 64 days	

==== Historical progression – average age, height and weight ====
The following table shows the historical progression of the record of average age at the Olympic Games.

Average age	Achievement	Games	Date	Duration of record	Ref
**26 years, 77 days**	**Set record**	(Belgium) 1920 Antwerp	Aug 24, 1920	11 years, 348 days	
**26 years, 220 days**	**Broke record**	(United States) 1932 Los Angeles	Aug 6, 1932	4 years, 2 days	
**29 years, 183 days**	**Broke record**	(Germany) 1936 Berlin	Aug 8, 1936	11 years, 357 days	
**31 years, 185 days**	**Broke record**	(United Kingdom) 1948 London	Jul 30, 1948	78 years, 63 days	

The following table shows the historical progression of the record of average height at the Olympic Games.

Average height	Achievement	Games	Date	Duration of record	Ref
6 ft 1 in (1.85 m)	**Set record**	(Australia) 1956 Melbourne	Nov 28, 1956	27 years, 247 days	
6 ft 1 in (1.85 m)	Tied record	(West Germany) 1972 Munich	Aug 27, 1972	27 years, 247 days	
6 ft 2 in (1.88 m)	**Broke record**	(United States) 1984 Los Angeles	Aug 1, 1984	4 years, 51 days	
6 ft 2.5 in (1.89 m)	**Broke record**	(South Korea) 1988 Seoul	Sep 21, 1988	3 years, 315 days	
6 ft 3.5 in (1.92 m)	**Broke record**	(Spain) 1992 Barcelona	Aug 1, 1992	16 years, 9 days	
6 ft 3.5 in (1.92 m)	Tied record	(United States) 1996 Atlanta	Jul 20, 1996	16 years, 9 days	
6 ft 3.5 in (1.92 m)	Tied record	(Australia) 2000 Sydney	Sep 23, 2000	16 years, 9 days	
6 ft 3.5 in (1.92 m)	Tied record	(Greece) 2004 Athens	Aug 15, 2004	16 years, 9 days	
6 ft 4 in (1.93 m)	**Broke record**	(China) 2008 Beijing	Aug 10, 2008	3 years, 354 days	
6 ft 4.5 in (1.94 m)	**Broke record**	(United Kingdom) 2012 London	Jul 29, 2012	14 years, 64 days	
6 ft 4.5 in (1.94 m)	Tied record	(Brazil) 2016 Rio de Janeiro	Aug 6, 2016	14 years, 64 days	

The following table shows the historical progression of the record of average weight at the Olympic Games.

Average weight	Achievement	Games	Date	Duration of record	Ref
182 lb (83 kg)	**Set record**	(Australia) 1956 Melbourne	Nov 28, 1956	11 years, 321 days	
184 lb (83 kg)	**Broke record**	1968 Mexico City	Oct 14, 1968	3 years, 318 days	
188 lb (85 kg)	**Broke record**	(West Germany) 1972 Munich	Aug 27, 1972	11 years, 340 days	
190 lb (86 kg)	**Broke record**	(United States) 1984 Los Angeles	Aug 1, 1984	4 years, 51 days	
201 lb (91 kg)	**Broke record**	(South Korea) 1988 Seoul	Sep 21, 1988	3 years, 315 days	
203 lb (92 kg)	**Broke record**	(Spain) 1992 Barcelona	Aug 1, 1992	8 years, 53 days	
203 lb (92 kg)	Tied record	(United States) 1996 Atlanta	Jul 20, 1996	8 years, 53 days	
208 lb (94 kg)	**Broke record**	(Australia) 2000 Sydney	Sep 23, 2000	3 years, 327 days	
210 lb (95 kg)	**Broke record**	(Greece) 2004 Athens	Aug 15, 2004	3 years, 361 days	
218 lb (99 kg)	**Broke record**	(China) 2008 Beijing	Aug 10, 2008	3 years, 354 days	
220 lb (100 kg)	**Broke record**	(United Kingdom) 2012 London	Jul 29, 2012	14 years, 64 days	
220 lb (100 kg)	Tied record	(Brazil) 2016 Rio de Janeiro	Aug 6, 2016	14 years, 64 days	

== Individual ==
=== Appearances ===
==== Most appearances ====
The following tables are pre-sorted by number of Olympic appearances (in descending order), date of the last Olympic appearance (in ascending order), date of the first Olympic appearance (in ascending order), name of the person (in ascending order), respectively.

Sixteen athletes have each made at least three Olympic appearances. Tony Azevedo is the first and only American water polo player (man or woman) to have competed in five Olympic Games (2000–2016).

Rk	Name	Pos	H	App	Games as player	Period	Birthdate	Age of first Olympic app	Age of last Olympic app	Ref
1	Tony Azevedo	D	R	5	2000, 2004, 2008 (silver) , 2012, 2016	15 years, 326 days	Nov 21, 1981	18 years, 307 days	34 years, 267 days	
2	Wally O'Connor	FP		4	1924 (bronze) , 1928, 1932 (bronze) , 1936	12 years, 28 days	Aug 25, 1903	20 years, 323 days	32 years, 351 days	
2	Ryan Bailey	CF	R	4	2000, 2004, 2008 (silver) , 2012	11 years, 324 days	Aug 28, 1975	25 years, 26 days	36 years, 350 days	
2	Jesse Smith	CB/U	R	4	2004, 2008 (silver) , 2012, 2016	11 years, 365 days	Apr 27, 1983	21 years, 110 days	33 years, 109 days	
5	Ron Crawford	D/CF	R	3	1960, 1964, 1968	8 years, 60 days	Dec 6, 1939	20 years, 264 days	28 years, 324 days	
5	Stan Cole	CF/D	R	3	1964, 1968, 1972 (bronze)	7 years, 329 days	Oct 12, 1945	18 years, 365 days	26 years, 328 days	
5	Terry Schroeder	CF		3	1984 (silver) , 1988 (silver) , 1992	8 years, 8 days	Oct 9, 1958	25 years, 297 days	33 years, 305 days	
5	Craig Wilson	GK		3	1984 (silver) , 1988 (silver) , 1992	8 years, 8 days	Feb 5, 1957	27 years, 178 days	35 years, 186 days	
5	Chris Duplanty	GK		3	1988 (silver) , 1992, 1996	7 years, 311 days	Oct 21, 1965	22 years, 336 days	30 years, 281 days	
5	Mike Evans	D		3	1988 (silver) , 1992, 1996	7 years, 311 days	Mar 26, 1960	28 years, 179 days	36 years, 124 days	
5	Chris Humbert	CF	L	3	1992, 1996, 2000	8 years, 61 days	Dec 27, 1969	22 years, 218 days	30 years, 279 days	
5	Wolf Wigo	D		3	1996, 2000, 2004	8 years, 40 days	May 8, 1973	23 years, 73 days	31 years, 113 days	
5	Layne Beaubien	CB/U	R	3	2004, 2008 (silver) , 2012	7 years, 363 days	Jul 4, 1976	28 years, 42 days	36 years, 39 days	
5	Jeff Powers	CF/CB/U	R	3	2004, 2008 (silver) , 2012	7 years, 363 days	Jan 21, 1980	24 years, 207 days	32 years, 204 days	
5	Adam Wright	D	R	3	2004, 2008 (silver) , 2012	7 years, 363 days	May 4, 1977	27 years, 103 days	35 years, 100 days	
5	Merrill Moses	GK	R	3	2008 (silver) , 2012, 2016	8 years, 4 days	Aug 13, 1977	30 years, 363 days	39 years, 1 day	
Rk	Name	Pos	H	App	Games as player	Period	Birthdate	Age of first Olympic app	Age of last Olympic app	Ref

Six men have each made two Olympic appearances as head coaches of the United States men's national team.

Name	App	Games as head coach	Period	Birthdate	Age of first Olympic app	Age of last Olympic app	Ref
Otto Wahle	2	1920, 1924 (bronze)	3 years, 331 days	Nov 5, 1879	40 years, 293 days	44 years, 258 days	
Neil Kohlhase	2	1956, 1960	3 years, 280 days				
Urho Saari	2	1952, 1964	12 years, 80 days				
Monte Nitzkowski	2	1972 (bronze) , 1984 (silver)	11 years, 349 days	Sep 7, 1929	42 years, 355 days	54 years, 338 days	
Bill Barnett	2	1988 (silver) , 1992	3 years, 323 days				
Terry Schroeder	2	2008 (silver) , 2012	4 years, 2 days	Oct 9, 1958	49 years, 306 days	53 years, 308 days	

Four Americans have each made Olympic appearances as players and as head coaches of the United States men's national team.

Rk	Name	App	Games		Period	Birthdate	Age of first Olympic app	Age of last Olympic app	Ref
Rk	Name	App	As player	As head coach	Period	Birthdate	Age of first Olympic app	Age of last Olympic app	Ref
1	Terry Schroeder	5	1984 (silver) , 1988 (silver) , 1992	2008 (silver) , 2012	28 years, 11 days	Oct 9, 1958	25 years, 297 days	53 years, 308 days	
2	Perry McGillivray	2	1920	1928	7 years, 353 days	Aug 5, 1893	27 years, 19 days	35 years, 6 days	
2	Austin Clapp	2	1932 (bronze)	1948	15 years, 363 days	Nov 8, 1910	21 years, 272 days	37 years, 269 days	
2	John Vargas	2	1992	2000	8 years, 61 days	Jun 17, 1961	31 years, 45 days	39 years, 106 days	

==== Historical progression – appearances of players ====
The following table shows the historical progression of appearances of players at the Olympic Games.

App	Achievement	Games	No.	Player	Pos	H	Height	Date	Age	Duration of record	Ref
2	Set record	1924 (bronze)		Herb Vollmer	FP		6 ft 0 in (1.83 m)	Jul 13, 1924	29	8 years, 24 days	
2	Tied record	1928		George Mitchell	FP			Aug 6, 1928	27	8 years, 24 days	
2	Tied record	1928		Wally O'Connor	FP			Aug 6, 1928	24	8 years, 24 days	
2	Tied record	1928		George Schroth	FP		6 ft 4 in (1.93 m)	Aug 6, 1928	28	8 years, 24 days	
2	Tied record	1928		Johnny Weissmuller	FP		6 ft 3 in (1.91 m)	Aug 6, 1928	24	8 years, 24 days	
3	Broke record	1932 (bronze)		Wally O'Connor	FP			Aug 6, 1932	28	4 years, 2 days	
4	Broke record	1936		Wally O'Connor	FP			Aug 8, 1936	32	79 years, 364 days	
4	Tied record	2012	8	Tony Azevedo	D	R	6 ft 1 in (1.85 m)	Jul 29, 2012	30	79 years, 364 days	
4	Tied record	2012	9	Ryan Bailey	CF	R	6 ft 5.5 in (1.97 m)	Jul 29, 2012	36	79 years, 364 days	
5	Broke record	2016	8	Tony Azevedo	D	R	6 ft 1 in (1.85 m)	Aug 6, 2016	34	10 years, 56 days	

=== Matches played ===
==== Players with at least 20 matches played at the Olympics ====
The following table is pre-sorted by number of total matches played (in descending order), edition of the Olympics (in ascending order), name of the player (in ascending order), respectively.

Tony Azevedo is the American water polo player with the most matches played at the Olympic Games.

Players with at least 20 matches played at the Olympics (1920–2016)
Rk	Player	Games (matches played)	TMP	Pos	H	Height	Ref
1	Tony Azevedo	2000 (8), 2004 (7), 2008 (7) (silver) , 2012 (8), 2016 (5)	35	D	R	6 ft 1 in (1.85 m)	
2	Ryan Bailey	2000 (8), 2004 (7), 2008 (7) (silver) , 2012 (8)	30	CF	R	6 ft 5.5 in (1.97 m)	
3	Jesse Smith	2004 (7), 2008 (7) (silver) , 2012 (8), 2016 (5)	27	CB/U	R	6 ft 4 in (1.93 m)	
4	Chris Humbert	1992 (7), 1996 (8), 2000 (8)	23	CF	L	6 ft 6.5 in (1.99 m)	
4	Wolf Wigo	1996 (8), 2000 (8), 2004 (7)	23	D		6 ft 1.5 in (1.87 m)	
6	Layne Beaubien	2004 (7), 2008 (7) (silver) , 2012 (8)	22	CB/U	R	6 ft 5.5 in (1.97 m)	
6	Jeff Powers	2004 (7), 2008 (7) (silver) , 2012 (8)	22	CF/CB/U	R	6 ft 7 in (2.01 m)	
6	Adam Wright	2004 (7), 2008 (7) (silver) , 2012 (8)	22	D	R	6 ft 3 in (1.91 m)	
9	Terry Schroeder	1984 (7) (silver) , 1988 (7) (silver) , 1992 (7)	21	CF		6 ft 2.5 in (1.89 m)	
9	Craig Wilson	1984 (7) (silver) , 1988 (7) (silver) , 1992 (7)	21	GK		6 ft 4.5 in (1.94 m)	
9	Mike Evans	1988 (7) (silver) , 1992 (6), 1996 (8)	21	D		6 ft 2 in (1.88 m)	
12	Stan Cole	1964 (3), 1968 (8), 1972 (9) (bronze)	20	CF/D	R	6 ft 1 in (1.85 m)	

==== Historical progression – total matches played ====
The following table shows the historical progression of the record of total matches played at the Olympic Games.

TMP	Achievement	Games	No.	Player	Pos	H	Height	Date	Age	Duration of record	Ref
10	Set record	1936		Wally O'Connor	FP			Aug 10, 1936	32	20 years, 116 days	
14	Broke record	1956		Bob Hughes	CF		6 ft 6 in (1.98 m)	Dec 4, 1956	25	11 years, 326 days	
17	Broke record	1968	4	Ron Crawford	D/CF	R	5 ft 10.5 in (1.79 m)	Oct 25, 1968	28	3 years, 315 days	
20	Broke record	1972 (bronze)	2	Stan Cole	CF/D	R	6 ft 1 in (1.85 m)	Sep 4, 1972	26	19 years, 340 days	
21	Broke record	1992	1	Craig Wilson	GK		6 ft 4.5 in (1.94 m)	Aug 9, 1992	35	8 years, 53 days	
21	Broke record	1992	10	Terry Schroeder	CF		6 ft 2.5 in (1.89 m)	Aug 9, 1992	33	8 years, 53 days	
21	Tied record	1996	11	Mike Evans	D		6 ft 2 in (1.88 m)	Jul 28, 1996	36	8 years, 53 days	
23	Broke record	2000	10	Chris Humbert	CF	L	6 ft 6.5 in (1.99 m)	Oct 1, 2000	30	11 years, 316 days	
23	Tied record	2004	2	Wolf Wigo	D		6 ft 1.5 in (1.87 m)	Aug 29, 2004	31	11 years, 316 days	
30	Broke record	2012	8	Tony Azevedo	D	R	6 ft 1 in (1.85 m)	Aug 12, 2012	30	4 years, 2 days	
30	Broke record	2012	9	Ryan Bailey	CF	R	6 ft 5.5 in (1.97 m)	Aug 12, 2012	36	4 years, 2 days	
35	Broke record	2016	8	Tony Azevedo	D	R	6 ft 1 in (1.85 m)	Aug 14, 2016	34	10 years, 48 days	

=== Scorers ===
==== Players with at least 15 goals at the Olympics ====
The following table is pre-sorted by number of total goals (in descending order), number of total matches played (in ascending order), edition of the Olympics (in ascending order), name of the player (in ascending order), respectively.

Tony Azevedo is the top scorer of all time for the United States men's Olympic water polo team, with 61 goals.

As a left-hander, Chris Humbert is the American water polo player with the second most goals at the Olympic Games, scoring 37.

Players with at least 15 goals at the Olympics (1920–2016)
Rk	Player	Games (goals)	TG	TMP	G/M	Pos	H	Height	Ref
1	Tony Azevedo	2000 (13), 2004 (15), 2008 (17) (silver) , 2012 (11), 2016 (5)	61	35	1.743	D	R	6 ft 1 in (1.85 m)	
2	Chris Humbert	1992 (7), 1996 (14), 2000 (16)	37	23	1.609	CF	L	6 ft 6.5 in (1.99 m)	
3	Bruce Bradley	1968 (18), 1972 (17) (bronze)	35	17	2.059	FP		6 ft 2 in (1.88 m)	
4	Wolf Wigo	1996 (8), 2000 (16), 2004 (7)	31	23	1.348	D		6 ft 1.5 in (1.87 m)	
5	Terry Schroeder	1984 (13) (silver) , 1988 (10) (silver) , 1992 (4)	27	21	1.286	CF		6 ft 2.5 in (1.89 m)	
6	Ryan Bailey	2000 (3), 2004 (2), 2008 (6) (silver) , 2012 (13)	24	30	0.800	CF	R	6 ft 5.5 in (1.97 m)	
7	Jody Campbell	1984 (10) (silver) , 1988 (12) (silver)	22	14	1.571	CF		6 ft 2.5 in (1.89 m)	
8	Mike Evans	1988 (10) (silver) , 1992 (7), 1996 (5)	22	21	1.048	D		6 ft 2 in (1.88 m)	
9	Kevin Robertson	1984 (13) (silver) , 1988 (8) (silver)	21	14	1.500	D	L	5 ft 8.5 in (1.74 m)	
10	Chris Oeding	1996 (11), 2000 (8)	19	16	1.188	D		6 ft 0.5 in (1.84 m)	
11	Phil Daubenspeck	1932 (14) (bronze) , 1936 (4)	18	7	2.571	FP			
12	Layne Beaubien	2004 (5), 2008 (8) (silver) , 2012 (4)	17	22	0.773	CB/U	R	6 ft 5.5 in (1.97 m)	
13	Peter Varellas	2008 (5) (silver) , 2012 (11)	16	15	1.067	D	L	6 ft 3 in (1.91 m)	
14	Jesse Smith	2004 (9), 2008 (3) (silver) , 2012 (3), 2016 (1)	16	27	0.593	CB/U	R	6 ft 4 in (1.93 m)	
15	Gary Sheerer	1968 (8), 1972 (7) (bronze)	15	17	0.882	FP		5 ft 8.5 in (1.74 m)	
16	Jeff Powers	2004 (4), 2008 (6) (silver) , 2012 (5)	15	22	0.682	CF/CB/U	R	6 ft 7 in (2.01 m)	
Rk	Player	Games (goals)	TG	TMP	G/M	Pos	H	Height	Ref

==== Historical progression – total goals at the Olympics ====
The following table shows the historical progression of the record of total goals at the Olympic Games.

TG	Achievement	Games	No.	Player	Pos	H	Height	Date	Age	Duration of record	Ref
6	Set record	1928		Herbert Topp	FP			Aug 11, 1928	28	4 years, 0 days	
14	Broke record	1932 (bronze)		Phil Daubenspeck	FP			Aug 11, 1932	26	3 years, 365 days	
18	Broke record	1936		Phil Daubenspeck	FP			Aug 10, 1936	30	36 years, 25 days	
18	Tied record	1968	6	Bruce Bradley	FP		6 ft 2 in (1.88 m)	Oct 25, 1968	21	36 years, 25 days	
35	Broke record	1972 (bronze)	6	Bruce Bradley	FP		6 ft 2 in (1.88 m)	Sep 4, 1972	25	28 years, 27 days	
37	Broke record	2000	10	Chris Humbert	CF	L	6 ft 6.5 in (1.99 m)	Oct 1, 2000	30	7 years, 328 days	
45	Broke record	2008 (silver)	8	Tony Azevedo	D	R	6 ft 1 in (1.85 m)	Aug 24, 2008	26	3 years, 354 days	
56	Broke record	2012	8	Tony Azevedo	D	R	6 ft 1 in (1.85 m)	Aug 12, 2012	30	4 years, 2 days	
61	Broke record	2016	8	Tony Azevedo	D	R	6 ft 1 in (1.85 m)	Aug 14, 2016	34	10 years, 48 days	

==== Players with at least 10 goals in an Olympic tournament ====
The following table is pre-sorted by number of goals (in descending order), number of matches played (in ascending order), edition of the Olympics (in ascending order), name of the player (in ascending order), respectively.

Bruce Bradley is the American male player with the most goals in an Olympic tournament, scoring 18.

Players with at least 10 goals in an Olympic tournament (1920–2016)
Rk	Player	Games	No.	G	MP	G/M	Pos	H	Height	Age	Ref
1	Bruce Bradley	1968	6	18	8	2.250	FP		6 ft 2 in (1.88 m)	21	
2	Tony Azevedo	2008 (silver)	8	17	7	2.429	D	R	6 ft 1 in (1.85 m)	26	
3	Bruce Bradley	1972 (bronze)	6	17	9	1.889	FP		6 ft 2 in (1.88 m)	25	
4	Wolf Wigo	2000	9	16	8	2.000	D		6 ft 1.5 in (1.87 m)	27	
4	Chris Humbert	2000	10	16	8	2.000	CF	L	6 ft 6.5 in (1.99 m)	30	
6	Tony Azevedo	2004	8	15	7	2.143	D	R	6 ft 1 in (1.85 m)	22	
7	Phil Daubenspeck	1932 (bronze)		14	4	3.500	FP			26	
8	Chris Humbert	1996	10	14	8	1.750	CF	L	6 ft 6.5 in (1.99 m)	26	
9	Kevin Robertson	1984 (silver)	2	13	7	1.857	D	L	5 ft 8.5 in (1.74 m)	25	
9	Terry Schroeder	1984 (silver)	10	13	7	1.857	CF		6 ft 2.5 in (1.89 m)	25	
11	Tony Azevedo	2000	8	13	8	1.625	D	R	6 ft 1 in (1.85 m)	18	
11	Ryan Bailey	2012	9	13	8	1.625	CF	R	6 ft 5.5 in (1.97 m)	36	
13	Fred Tisue	1960		12	7	1.714	FP		5 ft 8.5 in (1.74 m)	21	
13	Jody Campbell	1988 (silver)	11	12	7	1.714	CF		6 ft 2.5 in (1.89 m)	28	
15	Chris Oeding	1996	5	11	8	1.375	D		6 ft 0.5 in (1.84 m)	24	
15	Peter Varellas	2012	2	11	8	1.375	D	L	6 ft 3 in (1.91 m)	27	
15	Tony Azevedo	2012	8	11	8	1.375	D	R	6 ft 1 in (1.85 m)	30	
18	Jody Campbell	1984 (silver)	11	10	7	1.429	CF		6 ft 2.5 in (1.89 m)	24	
18	Terry Schroeder	1988 (silver)	10	10	7	1.429	CF		6 ft 2.5 in (1.89 m)	29	
18	Mike Evans	1988 (silver)	13	10	7	1.429	D		6 ft 2 in (1.88 m)	28	
Rk	Player	Games	No.	G	MP	G/M	Pos	H	Height	Age	Ref

==== Historical progression – goals in an Olympic tournament ====
The following table shows the historical progression of the record of goals in an Olympic tournament.

G	Achievement	Games	No.	Player	Pos	H	Height	Date	Age	Duration of record	Ref
6	Set record	1928		Herbert Topp	FP			Aug 11, 1928	28	4 years, 0 days	
14	Broke record	1932 (bronze)		Phil Daubenspeck	FP			Aug 11, 1932	26	36 years, 75 days	
18	Broke record	1968	6	Bruce Bradley	FP		6 ft 2 in (1.88 m)	Oct 25, 1968	21	57 years, 341 days	

==== Top scorers for each Olympic tournament ====
The following table shows the top scorers with at least five goals for each Olympic tournament, and is pre-sorted by edition of the Olympics (in ascending order), number of goals (in descending order), Cap number or name of the player (in ascending order), respectively.

Chris Humbert is the first and only American male player to have been the team-leading scorer for three Olympic tournaments (1992–2000).

Top scorers for each Olympic tournament (1920–2016)
Games	No.	Player	G	MP	G/M	Pos	H	Height	Age	Ref
1904 (gold) (silver) (bronze)										
1920	No players with at least five goals									
1924 (bronze)	No players with at least five goals									
1928		Herbert Topp	6	3	2.000	FP			28	
1932 (bronze)		Phil Daubenspeck	14	4	3.500	FP			26	
1936	No players with at least five goals									
1948	No players with at least five goals									
1952		Bill Kooistra	7	7	1.000	FP		5 ft 10.5 in (1.79 m)	25	
1956	No players with at least five goals									
1960		Fred Tisue	12	7	1.714	FP		5 ft 8.5 in (1.74 m)	21	
1964	No players with at least five goals									
1968	6	Bruce Bradley	18	8	2.250	FP		6 ft 2 in (1.88 m)	21	
1972 (bronze)	6	Bruce Bradley	17	9	1.889	FP		6 ft 2 in (1.88 m)	25	
1984 (silver)	2	Kevin Robertson	13	7	1.857	D	L	5 ft 8.5 in (1.74 m)	25	
1984 (silver)	10	Terry Schroeder	13	7	1.857	CF		6 ft 2.5 in (1.89 m)	25	
1988 (silver)	11	Jody Campbell	12	7	1.714	CF		6 ft 2.5 in (1.89 m)	28	
1992	4	Mike Evans	7	6	1.167	D		6 ft 2 in (1.88 m)	32	
1992	9	Chris Humbert	7	7	1.000	CF	L	6 ft 6.5 in (1.99 m)	22	
1992	12	Erich Fischer	7	7	1.000	CB/U		6 ft 2.5 in (1.89 m)	26	
1996	10	Chris Humbert	14	8	1.750	CF	L	6 ft 6.5 in (1.99 m)	26	
2000	9	Wolf Wigo	16	8	2.000	D		6 ft 1.5 in (1.87 m)	27	
2000	10	Chris Humbert	16	8	2.000	CF	L	6 ft 6.5 in (1.99 m)	30	
2004	8	Tony Azevedo	15	7	2.143	D	R	6 ft 1 in (1.85 m)	22	
2008 (silver)	8	Tony Azevedo	17	7	2.429	D	R	6 ft 1 in (1.85 m)	26	
2012	9	Ryan Bailey	13	8	1.625	CF	R	6 ft 5.5 in (1.97 m)	36	
2016	10	Bret Bonanni	8	5	1.600	D	R	6 ft 4 in (1.93 m)	22	
Games	No.	Player	G	MP	G/M	Pos	H	Height	Age	Ref

==== Players with at least 4 goals in an Olympic match ====
The following table is pre-sorted by number of goals (in descending order), date of the match (in ascending order), name of the player (in ascending order), respectively.

In water polo, if a player scores three times in a game, a hat-trick is made. Thirty-two American athletes have each made at least one hat-trick in an Olympic match.

Tony Azevedo is the American water polo player with the most hat-tricks made at the Olympic Games, scoring 11.

Bruce Bradley and Chris Humbert are the joint American male players with the second most hat-tricks made at the Olympic Games, scoring 6.

Players with at least 4 goals in an Olympic match (1920–2016)
Rk	Player	Games	No.	G	Date	Match	Pos	H	Age	Ref
1	Herbert Topp	1928		6	Aug 8, 1928	United States 10–0 Malta	FP		28	
1	Phil Daubenspeck	1932 (bronze)		6	Aug 6, 1932	United States 6–1 Brazil	FP		26	
3	Phil Daubenspeck	1932 (bronze)		5	Aug 7, 1932	United States 10–0 Japan	FP		26	
3	Fred Tisue	1960		5	Aug 27, 1960	United States 10–4 France	FP		21	
3	Tony Azevedo	2008 (silver)	8	5	Aug 10, 2008	United States 8–4 China	D	R	26	
6	Bill Kooistra	1952		4	Jul 27, 1952	United States 8–3 Great Britain	FP		25	
6	Bruce Bradley	1968	6	4	Oct 16, 1968	United States 10–7 Spain	FP		21	
6	Terry Schroeder	1988 (silver)	10	4	Sep 23, 1988	United States 14–7 China	CF		29	
6	Jody Campbell	1988 (silver)	11	4	Sep 26, 1988	United States 18–9 Greece	CF		28	
6	Chris Humbert	1996	10	4	Jul 21, 1996	United States 9–7 Greece	CF	L	26	
6	Chris Humbert	2000	10	4	Sep 25, 2000	United States 12–8 Netherlands	CF	L	30	
6	Wolf Wigo	2004	2	4	Aug 17, 2004	United States 9–6 Kazakhstan	D		31	
6	Tony Azevedo	2008 (silver)	8	4	Aug 24, 2008	Hungary 14–10 United States	D	R	26	
6	Tony Azevedo	2012	8	4	Aug 2, 2012	United States 13–7 Great Britain	D	R	30	
6	Bret Bonanni	2016	10	4	Aug 8, 2016	Spain 10–9 United States	D	R	22	
Rk	Player	Games	No.	G	Date	Match	Pos	H	Age	Ref

=== Goalkeepers ===
==== Starting goalkeepers ====
The following table is pre-sorted by edition of the Olympics (in ascending order), number of matches played (in descending order), Cap number or name of the player (in ascending order), respectively.

Craig Wilson is the first starting goalkeeper for the United States men's national team to have competed in three Olympic Games (1984–1992). He is the only starting goalkeeper to have won two Olympic medals (1984 (silver) , 1988 (silver) ).

Starting goalkeepers (1920–2016)
Games	No.	Goalkeeper	H	Height	Birthdate	Age	MP	Ref
1920		(Unknown)						
1924 (bronze)		Fred Lauer			Oct 13, 1898	25 years, 281 days	5	
1928		Harry Daniels			Jun 23, 1900	28 years, 49 days	3	
1932 (bronze)		Herb Wildman			Sep 6, 1912	19 years, 340 days	4	
1936		Herb Wildman			Sep 6, 1912	23 years, 339 days	2	
1948		Ralph Budelman			Apr 19, 1918	30 years, 106 days	3	
1952		Harry Bisbey			May 10, 1931	21 years, 84 days	9	
1956		Robert Horn		6 ft 2.5 in (1.89 m)	Nov 1, 1931	25 years, 34 days	5	
1960		Robert Horn		6 ft 2.5 in (1.89 m)	Nov 1, 1931	28 years, 307 days	4	
1964	1	Tony van Dorp	R	6 ft 5 in (1.96 m)	Jun 25, 1936	28 years, 110 days	3	
1968	1	Tony van Dorp	R	6 ft 5 in (1.96 m)	Jun 25, 1936	32 years, 122 days	8	
1972 (bronze)	1	Jim Slatton		6 ft 2 in (1.88 m)	Jul 30, 1947	25 years, 36 days	9	
1984 (silver)	1	Craig Wilson		6 ft 4.5 in (1.94 m)	Feb 5, 1957	27 years, 187 days	7	
1988 (silver)	1	Craig Wilson		6 ft 4.5 in (1.94 m)	Feb 5, 1957	31 years, 239 days	7	
1992	1	Craig Wilson		6 ft 4.5 in (1.94 m)	Feb 5, 1957	35 years, 186 days	7	
1996	1	Chris Duplanty		6 ft 2.5 in (1.89 m)	Oct 21, 1965	30 years, 281 days	8	
2000	1	Dan Hackett		6 ft 5.5 in (1.97 m)	Sep 11, 1970	30 years, 20 days	8	
2004	1	Brandon Brooks	R	6 ft 5.5 in (1.97 m)	Apr 29, 1981	23 years, 122 days	7	
2008 (silver)	1	Merrill Moses	R	6 ft 3 in (1.91 m)	Aug 13, 1977	31 years, 11 days	7	
2012	1	Merrill Moses	R	6 ft 3 in (1.91 m)	Aug 13, 1977	34 years, 365 days	8	
2016	1	Merrill Moses	R	6 ft 3 in (1.91 m)	Aug 13, 1977	39 years, 1 day	4	
Games	No.	Goalkeeper	H	Height	Birthdate	Age	MP	Ref

==== Most appearances of goalkeepers ====
The following table is pre-sorted by number of Olympic appearances (in descending order), date of the last Olympic appearance (in ascending order), date of the first Olympic appearance (in ascending order), name of the goalkeeper (in ascending order), respectively.

Ten American goalkeepers have each made at least two Olympic appearances.

Rk	Name	H	App	Games as player	Period	Birthdate	Age of first Olympic app	Age of last Olympic app	Ref
1	Craig Wilson		3	1984 (silver) , 1988 (silver) , 1992	8 years, 8 days	Feb 5, 1957	27 years, 178 days	35 years, 186 days	
1	Chris Duplanty		3	1988 (silver) , 1992, 1996	7 years, 311 days	Oct 21, 1965	22 years, 336 days	30 years, 281 days	
1	Merrill Moses	R	3	2008 (silver) , 2012, 2016	8 years, 4 days	Aug 13, 1977	30 years, 363 days	39 years, 1 day	
4	Fred Lauer		2	1924 (bronze) , 1936	12 years, 28 days	Oct 13, 1898	25 years, 274 days	37 years, 302 days	
4	Herb Wildman		2	1932 (bronze) , 1936	4 years, 4 days	Sep 6, 1912	19 years, 335 days	23 years, 339 days	
4	Robert Horn		2	1956, 1960	3 years, 280 days	Nov 1, 1931	25 years, 27 days	28 years, 307 days	
4	Tony van Dorp	R	2	1964, 1968	4 years, 14 days	Jun 25, 1936	28 years, 108 days	32 years, 122 days	
4	Steve Barnett		2	1968, 1972 (bronze)	3 years, 326 days	Jun 6, 1943	25 years, 130 days	29 years, 90 days	
4	Dan Hackett		2	1996, 2000	4 years, 73 days	Sep 11, 1970	25 years, 313 days	30 years, 20 days	
4	Brandon Brooks	R	2	2004, 2008 (silver)	4 years, 9 days	Apr 29, 1981	23 years, 108 days	27 years, 117 days	

==== Historical progression – appearances of goalkeepers ====
The following table shows the historical progression of appearances of goalkeepers at the Olympic Games.

App	Achievement	Games	No.	Goalkeeper	H	Height	Date	Age	Duration of record	Ref
2	Set record	1936		Herb Wildman			Aug 8, 1936	23	55 years, 359 days	
2	Set record	1936		Fred Lauer			Aug 8, 1936	37	55 years, 359 days	
2	Tied record	1960		Robert Horn		6 ft 2.5 in (1.89 m)	Aug 26, 1960	28	55 years, 359 days	
2	Tied record	1968	1	Tony van Dorp	R	6 ft 5 in (1.96 m)	Oct 14, 1968	32	55 years, 359 days	
2	Tied record	1972 (bronze)	9	Steve Barnett		6 ft 3 in (1.91 m)	Aug 27, 1972	29	55 years, 359 days	
2	Tied record	1988 (silver)	1	Craig Wilson		6 ft 4.5 in (1.94 m)	Sep 21, 1988	31	55 years, 359 days	
3	Broke record	1992	1	Craig Wilson		6 ft 4.5 in (1.94 m)	Aug 1, 1992	35	34 years, 61 days	
3	Tied record	1996	1	Chris Duplanty		6 ft 2.5 in (1.89 m)	Jul 20, 1996	30	34 years, 61 days	
3	Tied record	2016	1	Merrill Moses	R	6 ft 3 in (1.91 m)	Aug 6, 2016	38	34 years, 61 days	

==== Goalkeepers with at least 10 matches played at the Olympics ====
The following table is pre-sorted by number of total matches played (in descending order), edition of the Olympics (in ascending order), name of the goalkeeper (in ascending order), respectively.

Craig Wilson is the American goalkeeper with the most matches played at the Olympic Games.

Goalkeepers with at least 10 matches played at the Olympics (1920–2016)
Rk	Goalkeeper	Games (matches played)	TMP	H	Height	Ref
1	Craig Wilson	1984 (7) (silver) , 1988 (7) (silver) , 1992 (7)	21		6 ft 4.5 in (1.94 m)	
2	Merrill Moses	2008 (7) (silver) , 2012 (8), 2016 (4)	19	R	6 ft 3 in (1.91 m)	
3	Steve Barnett	1968 (8), 1972 (9) (bronze)	17		6 ft 3 in (1.91 m)	
4	Chris Duplanty	1988 (7) (silver) , 1992 (1), 1996 (8)	16		6 ft 2.5 in (1.89 m)	
5	Tony van Dorp	1964 (3), 1968 (8)	11	R	6 ft 5 in (1.96 m)	
6	Dan Hackett	1996 (2), 2000 (8)	10		6 ft 5.5 in (1.97 m)	

==== Historical progression – total matches played by goalkeepers ====
The following table shows the historical progression of the record of total matches played by goalkeepers at the Olympic Games.

TMP	Achievement	Games	No.	Goalkeeper	H	Height	Date	Age	Duration of record	Ref
5	Set record	1924 (bronze)		Fred Lauer			Jul 20, 1924	25	12 years, 20 days	
6	Broke record	1936		Herb Wildman			Aug 9, 1936	23	15 years, 359 days	
6	Tied record	1936		Fred Lauer			Aug 10, 1936	37	15 years, 359 days	
9	Broke record	1952		Harry Bisbey			Aug 2, 1952	21	16 years, 84 days	
9	Tied record	1960		Robert Horn		6 ft 2.5 in (1.89 m)	Sep 2, 1960	28	16 years, 84 days	
11	Broke record	1968	1	Tony van Dorp	R	6 ft 5 in (1.96 m)	Oct 25, 1968	32	3 years, 315 days	
17	Broke record	1972 (bronze)	1	Jim Slatton		6 ft 2 in (1.88 m)	Sep 4, 1972	29	19 years, 340 days	
21	Broke record	1992	1	Craig Wilson		6 ft 4.5 in (1.94 m)	Aug 9, 1992	35	34 years, 53 days	

=== Medalists ===
==== Multiple Olympic medalists in water polo ====
The following table is pre-sorted by number of Olympic medals (in descending order), type of the Olympic medal (in descending order), date of receiving an Olympic medal (in ascending order), name of the person (in ascending order), respectively.

Six American athletes have each won two Olympic medals in water polo. Aside from Wally O'Connor, who won medals before World War II, all were members of the men's national team that won consecutive silver medals in 1984 and 1988.

Rk	Name	Pos	H	Height	Games as player	Medals				Ref
Rk	Name	Pos	H	Height	Games as player	G	S	B	T	Ref
1	Jody Campbell	CF		6 ft 2.5 in (1.89 m)	1984 (silver) , 1988 (silver)	0	2	0	2	
1	Peter Campbell	CF/U		6 ft 3.5 in (1.92 m)	1984 (silver) , 1988 (silver)	0	2	0	2	
1	Kevin Robertson	D	L	5 ft 8.5 in (1.74 m)	1984 (silver) , 1988 (silver)	0	2	0	2	
1	Terry Schroeder	CF		6 ft 2.5 in (1.89 m)	1984 (silver) , 1988 (silver) , 1992	0	2	0	2	
1	Craig Wilson	GK		6 ft 4.5 in (1.94 m)	1984 (silver) , 1988 (silver) , 1992	0	2	0	2	
6	Wally O'Connor	FP			1924 (bronze) , 1928, 1932 (bronze) , 1936	0	0	2	2	

Monte Nitzkowski is the first and only man to have won two Olympic medals as the head coach of the United States men's national team.

Rk	Name	Games as head coach	Medals				Ref
Rk	Name	Games as head coach	G	S	B	T	Ref
1	Monte Nitzkowski	1972 (bronze) , 1984 (silver)	0	1	1	2	

Terry Schroeder is the first and only American (man or woman) to have won medals in the Olympic water polo tournaments both as a player and as a head coach.

Rk	Name	Games		Medals				Ref
Rk	Name	As player	As head coach	G	S	B	T	Ref
1	Terry Schroeder	1984 (silver) , 1988 (silver) , 1992	2008 (silver) , 2012	0	3	0	3	

==== Multiple Olympic medalists in water polo and swimming ====
The following table is pre-sorted by number of Olympic medals (in descending order), type of the Olympic medal (in descending order), date of the Olympic water polo tournament (in ascending order), name of the player (in ascending order), respectively.

Five American athletes have won Olympic medals in water polo and swimming.

As a member of the 1924 and 1928 U.S. Olympic water polo team, Johnny Weissmuller won five Olympic gold medals in swimming and one bronze medal in water polo.

Tim Shaw is the only American athlete to have won Olympic medals in water polo and swimming after World War II.

Rk	Name	Height	Water polo				Swimming	Medals				Ref
Rk	Name	Height	Year	No.	Pos	H	Swimming	G	S	B	T	Ref
1	Johnny Weissmuller	6 ft 3 in (1.91 m)	1924 (bronze); 1928		FP		1924 (gold) – 100 meter freestyle 1924 (gold) – 400 meter freestyle 1924 (gold) – 4×200 meter freestyle relay 1928 (gold) – 100 meter freestyle 1928 (gold) – 4×200 meter freestyle relay	5	0	1	6	
2	Wally O'Connor		1924 (bronze); 1928; 1932 (bronze); 1936		FP		1924 (gold) – 4×200 meter freestyle relay	1	0	2	3	
3	Austin Clapp		1932 (bronze)		FP		1928 (gold) – 4×200 meter freestyle relay	1	0	1	2	
4	Tim Shaw	6 ft 2 in (1.88 m)	1984 (silver)	12	D		1976 (silver) – 400 meter freestyle	0	2	0	2	
5	Jam Handy		1924 (bronze)		FP		1904 (bronze) – 440 yard breaststroke	0	0	2	2	

=== Head coaches ===
Monte Nitzkowski is the first and only coach to lead the United States men's national team to have won two Olympic medals (1972 (bronze) , 1984 (silver) ).

Head coaches (1920–2016)
Games	Head coach	Nationality	Birthdate	Age	MC	W	D	L	Win %	Ref
1920	Otto Wahle	United States	Nov 5, 1879	40 years, 298 days	5	2	0	3	40.00%	
1924 (bronze)	Harry Hebner (did not go) (Note: Harry Hebner was appointed head coach for the 1924 games, but he did not go due to business commitment.)	United States	Jun 15, 1891	33 years, 35 days	0	––	––	––	––	
1924 (bronze)	Otto Wahle	United States	Nov 5, 1879	44 years, 258 days	5	2	0	3	40.00%	
1928	Perry McGillivray	United States	Aug 5, 1893	35 years, 6 days	3	1	0	2	33.33%	
1932 (bronze)	Frank Rivas	United States			4	2	1	1	50.00%	
1936	Clyde Swendsen	United States	May 25, 1895	41 years, 77 days	3	1	0	2	33.33%	
1948	Austin Clapp	United States	Nov 8, 1910	37 years, 269 days	3	1	1	1	33.33%	
1952	Urho Saari	United States			9	5	0	4	55.56%	
1956	Neil Kohlhase	United States			6	2	0	4	33.33%	
1960	Neil Kohlhase	United States			7	3	0	4	42.86%	
1964	Urho Saari	United States			3	1	0	2	33.33%	
1968	Art Lambert	United States			8	5	1	2	62.50%	
1972 (bronze)	Monte Nitzkowski	United States	Sep 7, 1929	42 years, 363 days	9	6	2	1	66.67%	
1980^{*}	Monte Nitzkowski	United States	Sep 7, 1929	50 years, 326 days	0	Qualified but withdrew				
1984 (silver)	Monte Nitzkowski	United States	Sep 7, 1929	54 years, 338 days	7	6	1	0	85.71%	
1988 (silver)	Bill Barnett	United States			7	5	0	2	71.43%	
1992	Bill Barnett	United States			7	4	0	3	57.14%	
1996	Richard Corso	United States			8	5	0	3	62.50%	
2000	John Vargas	United States	Jun 17, 1961	39 years, 106 days	8	3	0	5	37.50%	
2004	Ratko Rudić	Italy	Jun 7, 1948	56 years, 83 days	7	4	0	3	57.14%	
2008 (silver)	Terry Schroeder	United States	Oct 9, 1958	49 years, 320 days	7	5	0	2	71.43%	
2012	Terry Schroeder	United States	Oct 9, 1958	53 years, 308 days	8	3	0	5	37.50%	
2016	Dejan Udovičić	Serbia	Jul 27, 1970	46 years, 18 days	5	2	0	3	40.00%	
Games	Head coach	Nationality	Birthdate	Age	MC	W	D	L	Win %	Ref

^{*}Qualified but withdrew.

==== Historical progression – appearances of head coaches ====
The following table shows the historical progression of appearances of head coaches at the Olympic Games.

App	Achievement	Games	Head coach	Date	Age	Duration of record	Ref
1	Set record	1920	Otto Wahle	Aug 24, 1920	40	3 years, 324 days	
2	Broke record	1924 (bronze)	Otto Wahle	Jul 13, 1924	44	102 years, 80 days	
2	Tied record	1960	Neil Kohlhase	Aug 26, 1960		102 years, 80 days	
2	Tied record	1964	Urho Saari	Oct 11, 1964		102 years, 80 days	
2	Tied record	1984 (silver)	Monte Nitzkowski	Aug 1, 1984	54	102 years, 80 days	
2	Tied record	1992	Bill Barnett	Aug 1, 1992		102 years, 80 days	
2	Tied record	2012	Terry Schroeder	Jul 29, 2012	53	102 years, 80 days	

=== Captains ===
Terry Schroeder and Tony Azevedo are the only two American water polo players (men or women) to have each captained in three Olympic tournaments.

Captains (1920–2016)
Games	No.	Captain	Pos	H	Height	Birthdate	Age	G	MP	G/M	Ref
1920		Harry Hebner	FP		5 ft 10.5 in (1.79 m)	Jun 15, 1891	29 years, 75 days	1	3	0.333	
1924 (bronze)		Herb Vollmer	FP		6 ft 0 in (1.83 m)	Feb 15, 1895	29 years, 156 days	3	5	0.600	
1928		George Mitchell	FP			Apr 23, 1901	27 years, 110 days	0	3	0.000	
1932 (bronze)		Wally O'Connor	FP			Aug 25, 1903	28 years, 352 days	2	4	0.500	
1936		Wally O'Connor	FP			Aug 25, 1903	32 years, 351 days	2	3	0.667	
1948		Edwin Knox	FP			Jul 24, 1914	34 years, 10 days	1	2	0.500	
1952		Jim Norris	CB		5 ft 10.5 in (1.79 m)	Jul 7, 1930	22 years, 26 days	0	8	0.000	
1956		Bill Kooistra	FP		5 ft 10.5 in (1.79 m)	Aug 26, 1926	30 years, 101 days	1	5	0.200	
1960		(Unknown)									
1964		(Unknown)									
1968	2	Dave Ashleigh	FP	R	6 ft 0 in (1.83 m)	Aug 8, 1943	25 years, 78 days	2	8	0.250	
1972 (bronze)	5	Gary Sheerer	FP		5 ft 8.5 in (1.74 m)	Feb 18, 1947	25 years, 199 days	7	9	0.778	
1980^{*}		(Unknown)						––	––	––	
1984 (silver)	10	Terry Schroeder	CF		6 ft 2.5 in (1.89 m)	Oct 9, 1958	25 years, 306 days	13	7	1.857	
1988 (silver)	10	Terry Schroeder	CF		6 ft 2.5 in (1.89 m)	Oct 9, 1958	29 years, 358 days	10	7	1.429	
1992	10	Terry Schroeder	CF		6 ft 2.5 in (1.89 m)	Oct 9, 1958	33 years, 305 days	4	7	0.571	
1996	1	Chris Duplanty	GK		6 ft 2.5 in (1.89 m)	Oct 21, 1965	30 years, 281 days	0	8	0.000	
2000	5	Chris Oeding	D		6 ft 0.5 in (1.84 m)	Sep 10, 1971	29 years, 21 days	8	8	1.000	
2004	2	Wolf Wigo	D		6 ft 1.5 in (1.87 m)	May 8, 1973	31 years, 113 days	7	7	1.000	
2008 (silver)	8	Tony Azevedo	D	R	6 ft 1 in (1.85 m)	Nov 21, 1981	26 years, 277 days	17	7	2.429	
2012	8	Tony Azevedo	D	R	6 ft 1 in (1.85 m)	Nov 21, 1981	30 years, 265 days	11	8	1.375	
2016	8	Tony Azevedo	D	R	6 ft 1 in (1.85 m)	Nov 21, 1981	34 years, 267 days	5	5	1.000	
Games	No.	Captain	Pos	H	Height	Birthdate	Age	G	MP	G/M	Ref

^{*}Qualified but withdrew.

==== Historical progression – appearances of captains ====
The following table shows the historical progression of appearances of captains at the Olympic Games.

App	Achievement	Games	No.	Captain	Pos	H	Height	Date	Age	Duration of record	Ref
1	Set record	1920		Harry Hebner	FP		5 ft 10.5 in (1.79 m)	Aug 24, 1920	29	15 years, 350 days	
1	Tied record	1924 (bronze)		Herb Vollmer	FP		6 ft 0 in (1.83 m)	Jul 13, 1924	29	15 years, 350 days	
1	Tied record	1928		George Mitchell	FP			Aug 6, 1928	27	15 years, 350 days	
1	Tied record	1932 (bronze)		Wally O'Connor	FP			Aug 6, 1932	28	15 years, 350 days	
2	Broke record	1936		Wally O'Connor	FP			Aug 8, 1936	32	55 years, 359 days	
2	Tied record	1988 (silver)	10	Terry Schroeder	CF		6 ft 2.5 in (1.89 m)	Sep 21, 1988	29	55 years, 359 days	
3	Broke record	1992	10	Terry Schroeder	CF		6 ft 2.5 in (1.89 m)	Aug 1, 1992	33	34 years, 61 days	
3	Tied record	2016	8	Tony Azevedo	D	R	6 ft 1 in (1.85 m)	Aug 6, 2016	34	34 years, 61 days	

=== Sprinters ===
The following table shows the players with at least three sprints for each Olympic tournament (2000–2016), and is pre-sorted by edition of the Olympics (in ascending order), number of sprints (in descending order), number of matches played (in descending order), Cap number or name of the player (in ascending order), respectively.

Sprinters are usually the fastest swimmers of the water polo team. If a water polo player won an Olympic medal in swimming, he would be an outstanding sprinter.

Brad Schumacher is the latest example. He won two gold medals for the United States at the 1996 Atlanta Olympics: in the men's 4×100 meter freestyle relay and in the men's 4×200 meter freestyle relay. At the 2000 Sydney Olympics, he was the top sprinter of the men's water polo tournament.

Sprinters (2000–2016)
Games	No.	Sprinter	MP	Sprints			Pos	H	Height	Birthdate	Age	Note	Ref
Games	No.	Sprinter	MP	W	T	Win %	Pos	H	Height	Birthdate	Age	Note	Ref
2000	7	Brad Schumacher	8	20	34	58.82%	D		6 ft 3.5 in (1.92 m)	Mar 6, 1974	26	1996 (gold) – 4×100 meter freestyle relay. 1996 (gold) – 4×200 meter freestyle relay. Top sprinter – 2000 water polo tournament.	
2004	8	Tony Azevedo	7	6	10	60.00%	D	R	6 ft 1 in (1.85 m)	Nov 21, 1981	22		
2004	3	Omar Amr	7	4	8	50.00%	D		5 ft 10.5 in (1.79 m)	Sep 20, 1974	29		
2004	2	Wolf Wigo	7	2	8	25.00%	D		6 ft 1.5 in (1.87 m)	May 8, 1973	31		
2008 (silver)	2	Peter Varellas	7	8	18	44.44%	D	L	6 ft 3 in (1.91 m)	Oct 2, 1984	23		
2008 (silver)	8	Tony Azevedo	7	2	5	40.00%	D	R	6 ft 1 in (1.85 m)	Nov 21, 1981	26		
2008 (silver)	7	Layne Beaubien	7	3	4	75.00%	U	R	6 ft 5.5 in (1.97 m)	Jul 4, 1976	32		
2012	2	Peter Varellas	8	10	15	66.67%	D	L	6 ft 3 in (1.91 m)	Oct 2, 1984	27		
2012	7	Layne Beaubien	8	4	8	50.00%	U	R	6 ft 5.5 in (1.97 m)	Jul 4, 1976	36		
2012	6	Shea Buckner	8	1	6	16.67%	D	R	6 ft 5 in (1.96 m)	Dec 12, 1986	25		
2016	7	Josh Samuels	5	5	10	50.00%	D	R	6 ft 4 in (1.93 m)	Jul 8, 1991	25		
2016	2	Thomas Dunstan	5	0	3	0.00%	D	L	6 ft 4 in (1.93 m)	Sep 29, 1997	18		
Games	No.	Sprinter	MP	W	T	Win %	Pos	H	Height	Birthdate	Age	Note	Ref
Games	No.	Sprinter	MP	Sprints			Pos	H	Height	Birthdate	Age	Note	Ref

=== Left-handed players ===
Most water polo players are right-handed. Skilled left-handed players are very valuable, because they can get special angles that right-handed players can not get. Left-handed drivers (attackers) are usually on the right side of the field. With right-handed drivers on the left side of the field, left-handed drivers allow their teams to launch two-sided attacks.

As a left-handed center (2-meter man), Chris Humbert is the American male player with the second most goals at the Olympic Games.

Kevin Robertson is one of the smallest but quickest player in American water polo history. As a left-handed driver (attacker), he is the American male player with the ninth most goals at the Olympic Games, and he is the first and only American male left-hander to have won two Olympic medals in water polo.

Left-handed players (1920–2016)
Games	No.	Player	Pos	Height	Birthdate	Age	G	MP	G/M	Ref
1972 (bronze)	11	Eric Lindroth	CF	6 ft 2 in (1.88 m)	Sep 12, 1951	20 years, 358 days	0	9	0.000	
1980^{*}		Eric Lindroth	CF	6 ft 2 in (1.88 m)	Sep 12, 1951	28 years, 321 days	––	––	––	
1980^{*}		Kevin Robertson	D	5 ft 8.5 in (1.74 m)	Feb 2, 1959	21 years, 178 days	––	––	––	
1984 (silver)	2	Kevin Robertson	D	5 ft 8.5 in (1.74 m)	Feb 2, 1959	25 years, 190 days	13	7	1.857	
1988 (silver)	2	Kevin Robertson	D	5 ft 8.5 in (1.74 m)	Feb 2, 1959	29 years, 242 days	8	7	1.143	
1988 (silver)	6	Craig Klass	CF	6 ft 4.5 in (1.94 m)	Jun 20, 1965	23 years, 103 days	2	7	0.286	
1992	9	Chris Humbert	CF	6 ft 6.5 in (1.99 m)	Dec 27, 1969	22 years, 226 days	7	7	1.000	
1992	11	Craig Klass	CF	6 ft 4.5 in (1.94 m)	Jun 20, 1965	27 years, 50 days	5	6	0.833	
1992	13	Alex Rousseau	CF	6 ft 4.5 in (1.94 m)	Nov 4, 1967	24 years, 279 days	5	7	0.714	
1996	3	Jeremy Laster	D	6 ft 4.5 in (1.94 m)	Feb 24, 1974	22 years, 155 days	7	8	0.875	
1996	7	Alex Rousseau	CF	6 ft 4.5 in (1.94 m)	Nov 4, 1967	28 years, 267 days	2	8	0.250	
1996	10	Chris Humbert	CF	6 ft 6.5 in (1.99 m)	Dec 27, 1969	26 years, 214 days	14	8	1.750	
2000	10	Chris Humbert	CF	6 ft 6.5 in (1.99 m)	Dec 27, 1969	30 years, 279 days	16	8	2.000	
2008 (silver)	2	Peter Varellas	D	6 ft 3 in (1.91 m)	Oct 2, 1984	23 years, 327 days	5	7	0.714	
2012	2	Peter Varellas	D	6 ft 3 in (1.91 m)	Oct 2, 1984	27 years, 315 days	11	8	1.375	
2016	2	Thomas Dunstan	D	6 ft 4 in (1.93 m)	Sep 29, 1997	18 years, 320 days	1	5	0.200	
Games	No.	Player	Pos	Height	Birthdate	Age	G	MP	G/M	Ref

^{*}Qualified but withdrew.

== Miscellaneous ==
=== Age records ===
==== Ten oldest players ====
The following table is pre-sorted by age of the last Olympic appearance (in descending order), date of the last Olympic appearance (in ascending order), Cap number or name of the player (in ascending order), respectively.

Ten oldest players (1920–2016)
Rk	Player	Pos	H	Birthdate	Date of last Olympic app	Age of last Olympic app	Games	No.	Ref
1	Charley Finn	FP		July 28, 1897	August 10, 1936	39 years, 13 days	1936		
2	Merrill Moses	GK	R	August 13, 1977	August 14, 2016	39 years, 1 day	2016	1	
3	Jam Handy	FP		March 6, 1886	July 20, 1924	38 years, 136 days	1924 (bronze)		
4	Fred Lauer	GK		October 13, 1898	August 10, 1936	37 years, 302 days	1936		
5	Ryan Bailey	CF	R	August 28, 1975	August 12, 2012	36 years, 350 days	2012	9	
6	Mike Evans	D		March 26, 1960	July 28, 1996	36 years, 124 days	1996	11	
7	Layne Beaubien	U	R	July 4, 1976	August 12, 2012	36 years, 39 days	2012	7	
8	Craig Wilson	GK		February 5, 1957	August 9, 1992	35 years, 186 days	1992	1	
9	Adam Wright	D	R	May 4, 1977	August 12, 2012	35 years, 100 days	2012	5	
10	Tony Azevedo	D	R	November 21, 1981	August 14, 2016	34 years, 267 days	2016	8	

==== Ten oldest Olympic debutants ====
The following table is pre-sorted by age of the first Olympic appearance (in descending order), date of the first Olympic appearance (in ascending order), Cap number or name of the player (in ascending order), respectively.

Ten oldest Olympic debutants (1920–2016)
Rk	Player	Pos	H	Birthdate	Date of first Olympic app	Age of first Olympic app	Games	No.	Ref
1	Jam Handy	FP		March 6, 1886	July 13, 1924	38 years, 129 days	1924 (bronze)		
2	Charley Finn	FP		July 28, 1897	August 6, 1932	35 years, 9 days	1932 (bronze)		
3	Edwin Knox	FP		July 24, 1914	July 30, 1948	34 years, 6 days	1948		
4	Robert Lynn	CB/U		February 7, 1967	September 23, 2000	33 years, 229 days	2000	3	
5	John Siman	CB		October 7, 1952	August 1, 1984	31 years, 299 days	1984 (silver)	8	
6	John Vargas	D		June 17, 1961	August 1, 1992	31 years, 45 days	1992	2	
7	Sophus Jensen			July 27, 1889	August 24, 1920	31 years, 28 days	1920		
8	Harold Dash	FP		July 22, 1917	July 30, 1948	31 years, 8 days	1948		
9	Merrill Moses	GK	R	August 13, 1977	August 10, 2008	30 years, 363 days	2008 (silver)	1	
10	Lee Case	FP		August 8, 1917	July 30, 1948	30 years, 357 days	1948		

==== Ten youngest players (Olympic debutants) ====
The following table is pre-sorted by age of the first Olympic appearance (in ascending order), date of the first Olympic appearance (in ascending order), Cap number or name of the player (in ascending order), respectively.

Ten youngest players (Olympic debutants, 1920–2016)
Rk	Player	Pos	H	Birthdate	Date of first Olympic app	Age of first Olympic app	Games	No.	Ref
1	Bob Saari	FP	R	June 7, 1948	October 11, 1964	16 years, 126 days	1964	7	
2	Ben Hallock	CF	R	November 22, 1997	August 6, 2016	18 years, 258 days	2016	3	
3	Bill Dornblaser	FP		November 4, 1933	July 25, 1952	18 years, 264 days	1952		
4	Tony Azevedo	D	R	November 21, 1981	September 23, 2000	18 years, 307 days	2000	8	
5	Thomas Dunstan	D	L	September 29, 1997	August 6, 2016	18 years, 312 days	2016	2	
6	Stan Cole	CF/D	R	October 12, 1945	October 11, 1964	18 years, 365 days	1964	6	
7	James Carson	FP		July 30, 1901	August 24, 1920	19 years, 25 days	1920		
8	Norman Lake	FP		December 8, 1932	July 25, 1952	19 years, 230 days	1952		
9	Herb Wildman	GK		September 6, 1912	August 6, 1932	19 years, 335 days	1932 (bronze)		
10	Johnny Weissmuller	FP		June 2, 1904	July 13, 1924	20 years, 41 days	1924 (bronze)		

==== Ten oldest Olympic medalists ====
The following table is pre-sorted by age of receiving an Olympic medal (in descending order), date of receiving an Olympic medal (in ascending order), Cap number or name of the player (in ascending order), respectively.

Ten oldest Olympic medalists (1920–2016)
Rk	Player	Pos	H	Birthdate	Date of receiving an Olympic medal	Age of receiving an Olympic medal	Games	No.	Ref
1	Jam Handy	FP		March 6, 1886	July 20, 1924	38 years, 136 days	1924 (bronze)		
2	Charley Finn	FP		July 28, 1897	August 13, 1932	35 years, 16 days	1932 (bronze)		
3	Ryan Bailey	CF	R	August 28, 1975	August 24, 2008	32 years, 362 days	2008 (silver)	9	
4	Layne Beaubien	U	R	July 4, 1976	August 24, 2008	32 years, 51 days	2008 (silver)	7	
5	John Siman	CB		October 7, 1952	August 10, 1984	31 years, 308 days	1984 (silver)	8	
6	Craig Wilson	GK		February 5, 1957	October 1, 1988	31 years, 239 days	1988 (silver)	1	
7	Adam Wright	D	R	May 4, 1977	August 24, 2008	31 years, 112 days	2008 (silver)	5	
8	Merrill Moses	GK	R	August 13, 1977	August 24, 2008	31 years, 11 days	2008 (silver)	1	
9	Jon Svendsen	CB		October 26, 1953	August 10, 1984	30 years, 289 days	1984 (silver)	7	
10	Greg Boyer	CF		February 5, 1958	October 1, 1988	30 years, 239 days	1988 (silver)	9	

==== Ten youngest Olympic medalists ====
The following table is pre-sorted by age of receiving an Olympic medal (in ascending order), date of receiving an Olympic medal (in ascending order), Cap number or name of the player (in ascending order), respectively.

Ten youngest Olympic medalists (1920–2016)
Rk	Player	Pos	H	Birthdate	Date of receiving an Olympic medal	Age of receiving an Olympic medal	Games	No.	Ref
1	Herb Wildman	GK		September 6, 1912	August 13, 1932	19 years, 342 days	1932 (bronze)		
2	Johnny Weissmuller	FP		June 2, 1904	July 20, 1924	20 years, 48 days	1924 (bronze)		
3	Wally O'Connor	FP		August 25, 1903	July 20, 1924	20 years, 330 days	1924 (bronze)		
4	J. W. Krumpholz	CF	R	September 22, 1987	August 24, 2008	20 years, 337 days	2008 (silver)	12	
5	Eric Lindroth	CF	L	September 12, 1951	September 4, 1972	20 years, 358 days	1972 (bronze)	11	
6	Austin Clapp	FP		November 8, 1910	August 13, 1932	21 years, 279 days	1932 (bronze)		
7	Art Austin	FP		July 8, 1902	July 20, 1924	22 years, 12 days	1924 (bronze)		
8	Chris Duplanty	GK		October 21, 1965	October 1, 1988	22 years, 346 days	1988 (silver)	12	
9	Oliver Horn	FP		June 22, 1901	July 20, 1924	23 years, 28 days	1924 (bronze)		
10	Tim Hutten	CB	R	June 4, 1985	August 24, 2008	23 years, 81 days	2008 (silver)	10	

=== Physical records ===
==== Ten tallest players ====
The following table is pre-sorted by height of the player (in descending order), edition of the Olympics (in ascending order), name of the player (in ascending order), respectively.

Ten tallest players (1920–2016)
Rk	Player	Pos	H	Height	Maximum weight	Games	Ref
1	Doug Kimbell	CB		6 ft 8.5 in (2.04 m)	229 lb (104 kg)	1988 (silver) , 1992	
2	McQuin Baron	GK	R	6 ft 8 in (2.03 m)	229 lb (104 kg)	2016	
3	Genai Kerr	GK		6 ft 7.5 in (2.02 m)	209 lb (95 kg)	2004	
4	Jeff Powers	CF/CB/U	R	6 ft 7 in (2.01 m)	238 lb (108 kg)	2004, 2008 (silver) , 2012	
4	Alex Roelse	CB	R	6 ft 7 in (2.01 m)	231 lb (105 kg)	2016	
6	Chris Humbert	CF	L	6 ft 6.5 in (1.99 m)	225 lb (102 kg)	1992, 1996, 2000	
6	Kyle Kopp	CF		6 ft 6.5 in (1.99 m)	229 lb (104 kg)	1996, 2000	
8	Bob Hughes	CF		6 ft 6 in (1.98 m)	225 lb (102 kg)	1952, 1956	
8	John Mann	CF	R	6 ft 6 in (1.98 m)	249 lb (113 kg)	2012, 2016	
8	Ben Hallock	CF	R	6 ft 6 in (1.98 m)	245 lb (111 kg)	2016	
8	Alex Obert	CF/CB	R	6 ft 6 in (1.98 m)	225 lb (102 kg)	2016	

==== Ten shortest players ====
The following table is pre-sorted by height of the player (in ascending order), edition of the Olympics (in ascending order), name of the player (in ascending order), respectively.

Ten shortest players (1920–2016)
Rk	Player	Pos	H	Height	Minimum weight	Games	Ref
1	Perry McGillivray	FP		5 ft 6.5 in (1.69 m)		1920	
1	Herbert Taylor			5 ft 6.5 in (1.69 m)		1920	
3	William Vosburgh	FP		5 ft 7.5 in (1.71 m)		1920	
4	Fred Tisue	FP		5 ft 8.5 in (1.74 m)	163 lb (74 kg)	1960	
4	Gary Sheerer	FP		5 ft 8.5 in (1.74 m)	161 lb (73 kg)	1968, 1972 (bronze)	
4	Kevin Robertson	D	L	5 ft 8.5 in (1.74 m)	165 lb (75 kg)	1980^{*}, 1984 (silver) , 1988 (silver)	
7	Clement Browne			5 ft 9 in (1.75 m)		1920	
7	Jack Spargo	D		5 ft 9 in (1.75 m)		1952	
9	Oliver Horn	FP		5 ft 10 in (1.78 m)		1924 (bronze)	
9	Ned McIlroy	FP	R	5 ft 10 in (1.78 m)	165 lb (75 kg)	1964	
9	John Vargas	D		5 ft 10 in (1.78 m)	154 lb (70 kg)	1992	

^{*}Qualified but withdrew.

==== Ten heaviest players ====
The following table is pre-sorted by maximum weight of the player (in descending order), edition of the Olympics (in ascending order), name of the player (in ascending order), respectively.

Ten heaviest players (1920–2016)
Rk	Player	Pos	H	Height	Maximum weight	Games	Ref
1	Paul Samson	FP		6 ft 5.5 in (1.97 m)	251 lb (114 kg)	1928	
2	Ryan Bailey	CF	R	6 ft 5.5 in (1.97 m)	249 lb (113 kg)	2000, 2004, 2008 (silver) , 2012	
2	John Mann	CF	R	6 ft 6 in (1.98 m)	249 lb (113 kg)	2012, 2016	
4	Brandon Brooks	GK	R	6 ft 5.5 in (1.97 m)	245 lb (111 kg)	2004, 2008 (silver)	
4	Ben Hallock	CF	R	6 ft 6 in (1.98 m)	245 lb (111 kg)	2016	
6	Jesse Smith	CB/U	R	6 ft 4 in (1.93 m)	240 lb (110 kg)	2004, 2008 (silver) , 2012, 2016	
7	Jeff Powers	CF/CB/U	R	6 ft 7 in (2.01 m)	238 lb (108 kg)	2004, 2008 (silver) , 2012	
8	Peter Hudnut	CB	R	6 ft 5 in (1.96 m)	231 lb (105 kg)	2008 (silver) , 2012	
8	Alex Roelse	CB	R	6 ft 7 in (2.01 m)	231 lb (105 kg)	2016	
10	Doug Kimbell	CB		6 ft 8.5 in (2.04 m)	229 lb (104 kg)	1988 (silver) , 1992	
10	Kyle Kopp	CF		6 ft 6.5 in (1.99 m)	229 lb (104 kg)	1996, 2000	
10	McQuin Baron	GK	R	6 ft 8 in (2.03 m)	229 lb (104 kg)	2016	

==== Ten lightest players ====
The following table is pre-sorted by minimum weight of the player (in descending order), edition of the Olympics (in ascending order), name of the player (in ascending order), respectively.

Ten lightest players (1920–2016)
Rk	Player	Pos	H	Height	Minimum weight	Games	Ref
1	Ronald Severa	FP		5 ft 10.5 in (1.79 m)	154 lb (70 kg)	1956, 1960	
1	John Vargas	D		5 ft 10 in (1.78 m)	154 lb (70 kg)	1992	
3	Ron Crawford	D/CF	R	5 ft 10.5 in (1.79 m)	161 lb (73 kg)	1960, 1964, 1968	
3	Gary Sheerer	FP		5 ft 8.5 in (1.74 m)	161 lb (73 kg)	1968, 1972 (bronze)	
5	Chick McIlroy	D/CF	R	5 ft 10.5 in (1.79 m)	163 lb (74 kg)	1960, 1964	
5	Fred Tisue	FP		5 ft 8.5 in (1.74 m)	163 lb (74 kg)	1960	
7	Ned McIlroy	FP	R	5 ft 10 in (1.78 m)	165 lb (75 kg)	1964	
7	Paul McIlroy	FP	R	5 ft 10.5 in (1.79 m)	165 lb (75 kg)	1964	
7	Ralph Whitney	FP	R	5 ft 10.5 in (1.79 m)	165 lb (75 kg)	1964	
7	Kevin Robertson	D	L	5 ft 8.5 in (1.74 m)	165 lb (75 kg)	1980^{*}, 1984 (silver) , 1988 (silver)	

^{*}Qualified but withdrew.

=== Birthplaces ===
==== Players born outside the United States ====
The following table is pre-sorted by edition of the Olympics (in ascending order), Cap number or name of the player (in ascending order), respectively.

Twelve players were born outside the United States, in four continents (Asia, Europe, North America, and South America).

Players born outside the United States (1920–2016)
Games	No.	Player	Pos	H	Birthplace	Country	Continent	Birthdate	Age	Ref
1920		Clement Browne			Freetown, Antigua	Leeward Islands	North America	Jan 4, 1896	24	
1924 (bronze)		Johnny Weissmuller	FP		Freidorf (Szabadfalva)	Austria-Hungary	Europe	Jun 2, 1904	20	
1928		Herbert Topp	FP		Copenhagen	Denmark	Europe	Apr 20, 1900	28	
1928		Johnny Weissmuller	FP		Freidorf (Szabadfalva)	Austria-Hungary	Europe	Jun 2, 1904	24	
1956		Bob Frojen	FP		Hamburg, Hamburg	Germany	Europe	Dec 1, 1930	25	
1956		Bill Ross	FP		Toronto, Ontario	Canada	North America	Jul 6, 1928	28	
1964	1	Tony van Dorp	GK	R	Batavia	Dutch East Indies	Asia	Jun 25, 1936	28	
1968	1	Tony van Dorp	GK	R	Batavia	Dutch East Indies	Asia	Jun 25, 1936	32	
1980^{*}		Drew McDonald	CB		Vancouver, British Columbia	Canada	North America	Oct 19, 1955	24	
1984 (silver)	9	Drew McDonald	CB		Vancouver, British Columbia	Canada	North America	Oct 19, 1955	28	
1988 (silver)	6	Craig Klass	CF	L	Wiesbaden, Hesse	West Germany	Europe	Jun 20, 1965	23	
1992	11	Craig Klass	CF	L	Wiesbaden, Hesse	West Germany	Europe	Jun 20, 1965	27	
1992	13	Alex Rousseau	CF	L	Paris	France	Europe	Nov 4, 1967	24	
1996	7	Alex Rousseau	CF	L	Paris	France	Europe	Nov 4, 1967	28	
2000	8	Tony Azevedo	D	R	Rio de Janeiro, Rio de Janeiro	Brazil	South America	Nov 21, 1981	18	
2004	8	Tony Azevedo	D	R	Rio de Janeiro, Rio de Janeiro	Brazil	South America	Nov 21, 1981	22	
2008 (silver)	8	Tony Azevedo (C)	D	R	Rio de Janeiro, Rio de Janeiro	Brazil	South America	Nov 21, 1981	26	
2012	8	Tony Azevedo (C)	D	R	Rio de Janeiro, Rio de Janeiro	Brazil	South America	Nov 21, 1981	30	
2016	5	Alex Roelse	CB	R	Gorinchem, South Holland	Netherlands	Europe	Jan 10, 1995	21	
2016	6	Luca Cupido	D	R	Genoa, Liguria	Italy	Europe	Nov 9, 1995	20	
2016	8	Tony Azevedo (C)	D	R	Rio de Janeiro, Rio de Janeiro	Brazil	South America	Nov 21, 1981	34	
Games	No.	Player	Pos	H	Birthplace	Country	Continent	Birthdate	Age	Ref

^{*}Qualified but withdrew.

=== Colleges ===
The following table is pre-sorted by number of times of players (in descending order), number of Olympic medals (in descending order), number of editions of the Olympics (in descending order), edition of the Olympics (in ascending order), name of the college (in ascending order), respectively.

Most athletes played collegiate water polo, many of them were NCAA Champions. The graduates from seven colleges in California (Long Beach State, Pepperdine, Stanford, UC Berkeley, UC Irvine, UCLA, and USC) have gone on to be the major part of the United States men's water polo Olympic team.

Rk	College		Players		Games				Medals				Ref
Rk	Name	Team	Number	Times	Year	Debut	Last	Edition	G	S	B	T	Ref
1	Stanford University	Stanford Cardinal	29	49	1924 (bronze) , 1928, 1932 (bronze) , 1936, 1956, 1964, 1968, 1972 (bronze) , 1980^{*}, 1984 (silver) , 1988 (silver) , 1992, 1996, 2000, 2004, 2008 (silver) , 2012, 2016 (Note: Players from Stanford University: 1924 (bronze) : Art Austin, Elmer Collett, Wally O'Connor; 1928: Wally O'Connor; 1932 (bronze) : Austin Clapp, Harold McCallister, Wally O'Connor, Cal Strong; 1936: Harold McCallister, Wally O'Connor; 1956: Bob Frojen, Jim Gaughran; 1964: George Stransky; 1968: John Parker, Gary Sheerer; 1972 (bronze) : John Parker, Gary Sheerer; 1980^{*}: Chris Dorst, Drew McDonald; 1984 (silver) : Doug Burke, Jody Campbell, Chris Dorst, Drew McDonald; 1988 (silver) : James Bergeson, Jody Campbell, Craig Klass, Alan Mouchawar; 1992: Erich Fischer, Craig Klass; 1996: Jeremy Laster, Rick McNair, Wolf Wigo; 2000: Tony Azevedo, Wolf Wigo; 2004: Tony Azevedo, Layne Beaubien, Wolf Wigo; 2008 (silver) : Tony Azevedo, Layne Beaubien, Peter Hudnut, Peter Varellas; 2012: Tony Azevedo, Layne Beaubien, Peter Hudnut, Peter Varellas; 2016: Tony Azevedo, Bret Bonanni, Alex Bowen, Ben Hallock. Note 1: Ogden Driggs and Reginald Harrison might be reserves or alternates in the 1928 tournament. They did not compete in this tournament. The official report of International Olympic Committee (IOC) did not count them as competitors. Note 2: Ted Wiget might be a reserve or alternate in the 1932 tournament. He did not compete in this tournament. The official report of IOC did not count him as a competitor or medalist.)	1924	2016	18	0	12	10	22	
2	University of California, Los Angeles	UCLA Bruins	24	37	1936, 1948, 1952, 1964, 1968, 1972 (bronze) , 1980^{*}, 1984 (silver) , 1992, 1996, 2000, 2004, 2008 (silver) , 2012, 2016 (Note: Players from University of California, Los Angeles: 1936: Dixon Fiske; 1948: Bob Bray, Chris Christensen, Dixon Fiske, Edwin Knox; 1952: Jack Spargo, Peter Stange; 1964: Dave Ashleigh, Stan Cole, Dan Drown; 1968: Dave Ashleigh, Bruce Bradley, Stan Cole, Russ Webb; 1972 (bronze) : Bruce Bradley, Stan Cole, Jim Ferguson, Eric Lindroth, Jim Slatton, Russ Webb; 1980^{*}: Eric Lindroth, Joe Vargas; 1984 (silver) : Joe Vargas; 1992: Alex Rousseau; 1996: Dan Hackett, Alex Rousseau; 2000: Dan Hackett, Sean Kern; 2004: Brandon Brooks, Brett Ormsby, Adam Wright; 2008 (silver) : Brandon Brooks, Adam Wright; 2012: Chay Lapin, Adam Wright; 2016: Alex Roelse, Josh Samuels. Note 1: Clyde Swendsen might be a reserve or alternate in the 1920 tournament. He did not compete in this tournament. Note 2: Jim Kelsey might be a reserve or alternate in the 1960 tournament. He did not compete in this tournament. The official report of International Olympic Committee did not count him as a competitor.)	1936	2016	15	0	3	6	9	
3	University of California, Berkeley	California Golden Bears	16	27	1924 (bronze) , 1928, 1960, 1968, 1972 (bronze) , 1980^{*}, 1984 (silver) , 1988 (silver) , 1992, 1996, 2000, 2012, 2016 (Note: Players from University of California, Berkeley: 1924 (bronze) : George Mitchell; 1928: George Mitchell; 1960: Gordie Hall, Ron Volmer; 1968: Barry Weitzenberg; 1972 (bronze) : Peter Asch, Barry Weitzenberg; 1980^{*}: Kevin Robertson, Peter Schnugg, Jon Svendsen; 1984 (silver) : Kevin Robertson, Jon Svendsen; 1988 (silver) : Kevin Robertson; 1992: Kirk Everist, Chris Humbert; 1996: Gavin Arroyo, Troy Barnhart, Jr., Kirk Everist, Chris Humbert, Chris Oeding; 2000: Gavin Arroyo, Chris Humbert, Sean Nolan, Chris Oeding; 2012: John Mann; 2016: Luca Cupido, John Mann.)	1924	2016	13	0	3	3	6	
4	University of California, Irvine	UC Irvine Anteaters	13	26	1980^{*}, 1984 (silver) , 1988 (silver) , 1992, 1996, 2000, 2004, 2008 (silver) , 2012 (Note: Players from University of California, Irvine: 1980^{*}: Gary Figueroa; 1984 (silver) : Peter Campbell, Gary Figueroa; 1988 (silver) : Jeff Campbell, Peter Campbell, Chris Duplanty, Mike Evans; 1992: Jeff Campbell, Chris Duplanty, Mike Evans, John Vargas; 1996: Chris Duplanty, Mike Evans; 2000: Ryan Bailey; 2004: Omar Amr, Ryan Bailey, Genai Kerr, Dan Klatt, Jeff Powers; 2008 (silver) : Ryan Bailey, Tim Hutten, Rick Merlo, Jeff Powers; 2012: Ryan Bailey, Tim Hutten, Jeff Powers.)	1980^{*}	2012	9	0	10	0	10	
5	University of Southern California	USC Trojans	20	25	1936, 1948, 1952, 1956, 1960, 1964, 1968, 1992, 2000, 2008 (silver) , 2012, 2016 (Note: Players from University of Southern California: 1936: Kenneth Beck; 1948: Kenneth Beck, Lee Case; 1952: Harry Bisbey, Marvin Burns, Bob Hughes, Jim Norris; 1956: Bob Hughes, Bill Ross, Ronald Severa, Wally Wolf; 1960: Chuck Bittick, Marvin Burns, Ronald Severa, Fred Tisue, Wally Wolf; 1964: Dan Drown, Ned McIlroy; 1968: Dean Willeford; 1992: Charlie Harris; 2000: Robert Lynn; 2008 (silver) : J. W. Krumpholz; 2012: Shea Buckner; 2016: McQuin Baron, Thomas Dunstan. Note 1: Reginald Harrison might be a reserve or alternate in the 1928 tournament. He did not compete in this tournament. The official report of International Olympic Committee (IOC) did not count him as a competitor. Note 2: Frank Walton might be a reserve or alternate in the 1948 tournament. He did not compete in this tournament. The official report of IOC did not count him as a competitor.)	1936	2016	12	0	1	0	1	
6	California State University, Long Beach	Long Beach State 49ers	9	16	1956, 1960, 1964, 1968, 1972 (bronze) , 1984 (silver) , 1988 (silver) , 1992, 1996, 2000, 2004 (Note: Players from California State University, Long Beach: 1956: Robert Horn; 1960: Ron Crawford, Robert Horn, Chick McIlroy; 1964: Ron Crawford, Chick McIlroy; 1968: Steve Barnett, Ron Crawford; 1972 (bronze) : Steve Barnett; 1984 (silver) : Tim Shaw; 1988 (silver) : Doug Kimbell; 1992: Doug Kimbell; 1996: Kyle Kopp; 2000: Chi Kredell, Kyle Kopp; 2004: Chris Segesman.)	1956	2004	11	0	2	1	3	
7	Pepperdine University	Pepperdine Waves	3	11	1980^{*}, 1984 (silver) , 1988 (silver) , 1992, 2004, 2008 (silver) , 2012, 2016 (Note: Players from Pepperdine University: 1980^{*}: Terry Schroeder; 1984 (silver) : Terry Schroeder; 1988 (silver) : Terry Schroeder; 1992: Terry Schroeder; 2004: Jesse Smith; 2008 (silver) : Merrill Moses, Jesse Smith; 2012: Merrill Moses, Jesse Smith; 2016: Merrill Moses, Jesse Smith.)	1980^{*}	2016	8	0	4	0	4	
8	University of California, Santa Barbara	UC Santa Barbara Gauchos	2	4	1984 (silver) , 1988 (silver) , 1992 (Note: Players from University of California, Santa Barbara: 1984 (silver) : Craig Wilson; 1988 (silver) : Greg Boyer, Craig Wilson; 1992: Craig Wilson.)	1984	1992	3	0	3	0	3	
9	Columbia University	Columbia Lions	3	4	1920, 1924 (bronze) , 1936, 1952 (Note: Players from Columbia University: 1920: Herb Vollmer; 1924 (bronze) : Herb Vollmer; 1936: Ray Ruddy; 1952: Edward Jaworski. Note: Ray Ruddy might be a reserve or alternate in the 1932 tournament. He did not compete in this tournament. The official report of International Olympic Committee did not count him as a competitor or medalist.)	1920	1952	4	0	0	1	1	
10	Northwestern University	Northwestern Wildcats	3	4	1948, 1952, 1956 (Note: Players from Northwestern University: 1948: Harold Dash; 1952: Bill Kooistra; 1956: Bill Kooistra, Sam Kooistra.)	1948	1956	3	0	0	0	0	
11	El Camino College		3	3	1952, 1964 (Note: Players from El Camino College: 1952: Bill Dornblaser, Norman Lake; 1964: Ralph Whitney.)	1952	1964	2	0	0	0	0	
12	California State University, Fullerton	Cal State Fullerton Titans	1	2	1980^{*}, 1984 (silver) (Note: Players from California State University, Fullerton: 1980^{*}: John Siman, 1984 (silver) : John Siman.)	1980^{*}	1984	2	0	1	0	1	
13	University of Michigan	Michigan Wolverines	2	2	1924 (bronze) , 1928 (Note: Players from University of Michigan: 1924 (bronze) : Jam Handy; 1928: Paul Samson.)	1924	1928	2	0	0	1	1	
13	Saint Mary's College of California	Saint Mary's Gaels	1	2	1924 (bronze) , 1928 (Note: Players from Saint Mary's College of California: 1924 (bronze) : George Schroth; 1928: George Schroth.)	1924	1928	2	0	0	1	1	
15	University of the Pacific	Pacific Tigers	2	2	2000, 2016 (Note: Players from University of the Pacific: 2000: Brad Schumacher; 2016: Alex Obert.)	2000	2016	2	0	0	0	0	
16	University of Illinois	Illinois Fighting Illini	2	2	1920 (Note: Players from University of Illinois: 1920: Perry McGillivray, William Vosburgh.)	1920	1920	1	0	0	0	0	
17	University of Arizona	Arizona Wildcats	1	1	1984 (bronze) (Note: Players from University of Arizona: 1984 (silver) : Tim Shaw.)	1984	1984	1	0	0	1	1	
18	University of Wisconsin	Wisconsin Badgers	1	1	1920 (Note: Players from University of Wisconsin: 1920: Herbert Taylor.)	1920	1920	1	0	0	0	0	
18	Fordham University	Fordham Rams	1	1	1928 (Note: Players from Fordham University: 1928: Joseph Farley.)	1928	1928	1	0	0	0	0	
18	University of Iowa	Iowa Hawkeyes	1	1	1928 (Note: Players from University of Iowa: 1928: Sam Greller.)	1928	1928	1	0	0	0	0	
18	DePaul University	DePaul Blue Demons	1	1	1956 (Note: Players from DePaul University: 1956: Ken Hahn.)	1956	1956	1	0	0	0	0	
18	San Jose State University	San Jose State Spartans	1	1	1980^{*} (Note: Players from San Jose State University: 1980^{*}: Steve Hamann.)	1980^{*}	1980^{*}	1	0	0	0	0	
Rk	Name	Team	Number	Times	Year	Debut	Last	Edition	G	S	B	T	Ref
Rk	College		Players		Games				Medals				Ref

^{*}Qualified but withdrew.

=== Water polo families ===
==== Brothers ====
The three McIlroy brothers (Paul, Chick and Ned) were all members of the 1964 United States men's Olympic water polo team.

The Kooistra brothers (Bill and Sam) played for the United States in water polo at the 1956 Olympics. Jeff Campbell competed alongside his elder brother, Peter, at the 1988 Olympics.

Relation- ship	Family	Name	Pos	Birthdate	Games	Age	Note	Ref
Three brothers	McIlroy	Chick McIlroy	D/CF	Aug 1, 1938	1960	22 years, 25 days		
Three brothers	McIlroy	Paul McIlroy	FP	May 12, 1937	1964	27 years, 152 days	Three brothers in an Olympic tournament	
Three brothers	McIlroy	Chick McIlroy	D/CF	Aug 1, 1938	1964	26 years, 71 days	Three brothers in an Olympic tournament	
Three brothers	McIlroy	Ned McIlroy	FP	Jul 26, 1939	1964	25 years, 77 days	Three brothers in an Olympic tournament	
Two brothers	Kooistra	Bill Kooistra	FP	Aug 26, 1926	1952	25 years, 334 days		
Two brothers	Kooistra	Bill Kooistra	FP	Aug 26, 1926	1956	30 years, 94 days	Two brothers in an Olympic tournament	
Two brothers	Kooistra	Sam Kooistra	FP	Aug 18, 1935	1956	21 years, 102 days	Two brothers in an Olympic tournament	
Two brothers	Campbell	Peter Campbell	CF	May 21, 1960	1984 (silver)	24 years, 72 days		
Two brothers	Campbell	Peter Campbell	CF/U	May 21, 1960	1988 (silver)	28 years, 123 days	Two brothers in an Olympic tournament	
Two brothers	Campbell	Jeff Campbell	CB	Oct 2, 1962	1988 (silver)	25 years, 355 days	Two brothers in an Olympic tournament	
Two brothers	Campbell	Jeff Campbell	CB	Oct 2, 1962	1992	29 years, 304 days		
Two brothers	Vargas	Joe Vargas	D	Oct 4, 1955	1980^{*}	24 years, 290 days		
Two brothers	Vargas	Joe Vargas	D	Oct 4, 1955	1984 (silver)	28 years, 302 days		
Two brothers	Vargas	John Vargas	D	Jun 17, 1961	1992	31 years, 45 days		
Two brothers	Vargas	John Vargas	Coach	Jun 17, 1961	2000	39 years, 98 days		

^{*}Qualified but withdrew.

Tony van Dorp, a Dutch-American goalkeeper, competed in the 1964 and 1968 Summer Olympics for the United States. His younger brother, Fred, was a Dutch field player, and played against his brother at the 1964 and 1968 Olympics.

Relation- ship	Family	Country represented	Name	Pos	Birthdate	Games	Age	Note	Ref
Two brothers	van Dorp	Netherlands	Fred van Dorp	FP	Oct 13, 1938	1960	21 years, 318 days		
Two brothers	van Dorp	United States	Tony van Dorp	GK	Jun 25, 1936	1964	28 years, 110 days	NED 6–4 USA (Oct 13, 1964)	
Two brothers	van Dorp	Netherlands	Fred van Dorp	FP	Oct 13, 1938	1964	26 years, 0 days	NED 6–4 USA (Oct 13, 1964)	
Two brothers	van Dorp	United States	Tony van Dorp	GK	Jun 25, 1936	1968	32 years, 121 days	USA 6–3 NED (Oct 24, 1968)	
Two brothers	van Dorp	Netherlands	Fred van Dorp	FP	Oct 13, 1938	1968	30 years, 11 days	USA 6–3 NED (Oct 24, 1968)	

==== Father-son ====
Relation- ship	Family	Name	Pos	Birthdate	Games	Age	Note	Ref
Father and son(s)	Saari	Urho Saari	Head coach		1952			
Father and son(s)	Saari	Urho Saari	Asst. coach		1960			
Father and son(s)	Saari	Urho Saari	Head coach		1964		Father and son in an Olympic tournament	
Father and son(s)	Saari	Bob Saari	FP	Jun 7, 1948	1964	16 years, 126 days	Father and son in an Olympic tournament	
Father and son(s)	Azevedo	Ricardo Azevedo	Asst. coach	Aug 24, 1956	1996	39 years, 331 days		
Father and son(s)	Azevedo	Tony Azevedo	D	Nov 21, 1981	2000	18 years, 307 days		
Father and son(s)	Azevedo	Ricardo Azevedo	Asst. coach	Aug 24, 1956	2004	47 years, 357 days	Father and son in an Olympic tournament	
Father and son(s)	Azevedo	Tony Azevedo	D	Nov 21, 1981	2004	22 years, 268 days	Father and son in an Olympic tournament	
Father and son(s)	Azevedo	Tony Azevedo	D	Nov 21, 1981	2008 (silver)	26 years, 263 days		
Father and son(s)	Azevedo	Tony Azevedo	D	Nov 21, 1981	2012	30 years, 251 days		
Father and son(s)	Azevedo	Tony Azevedo	D	Nov 21, 1981	2016	34 years, 259 days		

==== Father-daughter ====
Relation- ship	Family	Name	Pos	Birthdate	Games	Age	Note	Ref
Father and daughter(s)	Fischer	Erich Fischer	CB/U	Mar 12, 1966	1992	26 years, 142 days		
Father and daughter(s)	Fischer	Makenzie Fischer	CB	Mar 29, 1997	2016 (gold)	19 years, 133 days	Two sisters in an Olympic tournament	
Father and daughter(s)	Fischer	Aria Fischer	CF	Mar 2, 1999	2016 (gold)	17 years, 160 days	Two sisters in an Olympic tournament	

== See also ==
- United States men's Olympic water polo team statistics (appearances)
- United States men's Olympic water polo team statistics (matches played)
- United States men's Olympic water polo team statistics (scorers)
- United States men's Olympic water polo team statistics (goalkeepers)
- United States men's Olympic water polo team statistics (medalists)
- United States men's Olympic water polo team results
- List of United States men's Olympic water polo team rosters
- United States men's national water polo team
