= Ned McIlroy =

American water polo player (born 1939)

Personal information
- Full name: Ned Leroy McIlroy
- Nationality: American
- Born: July 26, 1939 (age 87) Noonan, North Dakota, United States
- Occupations: Los Angeles Lifeguard; Insurance Sales
- Height: 178 cm (5 ft 10 in)
- Weight: 75 kg (165 lb)
- Relatives: Chick McIlroy, Paul McIlroy

Sport
- Sport: Water polo
- Position: Field Player/Perimeter Driver (WP)
- College team: El Camino College
- Coached by: Urho Saari (El Segundo, 64 Olympics)

Ned Leroy McIlroy (born July 26, 1939) is a former American water polo player who competed for El Camino College. He participated in the men's water polo tournament at the 1964 Summer Olympics in Tokyo. After his athletic career, he worked as a Los Angeles area Lifeguard, and later as an insurance salesman.

== Early life and education ==
McIlroy was born July 26, 1939 in Noonan, North Dakota, one of ten children to father Kenneth McIlroy and mother Helen (Vadnais) McIlroy. His family moved to California soon after his birth, where he attended El Segundo High School in El Segundo, CA and competed for the El Segundo Swim Club under Coach Urho Saari, a USA Water Polo Hall of Fame member. He primarily played as a strong field player/driver.

=== Collegiate years ===
After graduating high school, McIlroy attended El Camino College in greater Los Angeles where continued to be coached by Urho Saari and was honored as a First Team Water Polo All-Metropolitan Conference team player in December 1958.

In non-Olympic international competition in 1963, Ned won the silver medal playing with the U.S. National team in Sao Paulo, Brazil at the Pan American Games.

== 1964 Tokyo Olympics ==
McIlroy participated in water polo at the 1964 Summer Olympics in Tokyo, where the U.S. Team tied for ninth place. In their first game, the Americans lost to a dominant team from Yugoslavia 2-1. In their second game, they defeated the team from Brazil 7-1, but were subsequently defeated by the team from the Netherlands, losing their chance to advance to the semi-finals. After semi-final play, pre-games favorite Hungary took the gold medal, Yugoslavia took the silver, and the Soviet Union took the bronze.

At the 1964 Olympics, Ned played with his brothers, Paul and Chick McIlroy. Ned's brother Paul McIlroy qualified in water polo for the 1964 U.S. Olympic team but did not get to play that year. The 1964 Water Polo team was again managed and trained by Head Olympic Coach Urho Sarri. Bob Horn, an Olympic team mate that year, would later coach the U.S. Olympic team.

After the Tokyo Olympics, Ned worked as a lifeguard in LA County, and later worked in insurance sales.
