= Fred Tisue =

American water polo player (born 1938)

Personal information
- Full name: Frederick Ernest Tisue Jr.
- Born: October 17, 1938 (age 87) Ames, Iowa, United States
- Height: 175 cm (5 ft 9 in)
- Weight: 74 kg (163 lb)
- Spouse: Sue Ellen Stoddard (m. 1966)

Sport
- Sport: Water polo, Swimming
- College team: University of Southern California ('60)
- Club: Lynwood Swim Club
- Coached by: Peter Daland (USC, Swimming); Neal Kohlhase (USC, Olympics)

Frederick "Fred" Ernest Tisue (born October 17, 1938) is an American water polo player who competed for the University of Southern California and participated in water polo at the 1960 Summer Olympics in Rome, where the U.S. placed seventh, and he tied for the most total goals scored during the tournament. After graduating from USC in 1960, he competed a DDS degree from Iowa State University in 1964, married, served as a Naval officer, and then practiced Dentistry in Torrance, California for over thirty years.

== Early life ==
Tisue was born October 17, 1938 in Ames, Iowa, one of several children to Mr. and Mrs. Fred E. Tisue Senior. From an athletic family, his brother James enjoyed horseback riding, and his younger brother Garold also swam competitively, and had an athletic scholarship to the University of Montana. After a family move around 1950, he attended Downey High School in the greater Los Angeles suburb of Downey where he participated in water polo and swimming, graduating in 1956. During his High School years, Tisue usually played Left Forward, a water polo position lining up on the perimeter of the pool, and requiring good ball handling, swimming speed for fast breaks, and the ability to pass accurately and receive passes from the team's center player. After the 1954 California Interscholastic Federation (CIF) water polo playoffs in early December 1954, where Downey High won a section championship, Tisue earned All-Coast League Honors. By 1956, as a multi-sport athlete, he held the short course record for the 200-yard butterfly with a time of 2:40.00. Ability in the butterfly or breast stroke was beneficial to play in water polo, as it allowed players to move forward quickly in fast breaks, while leaving their hands close to the surface for ball handling.

An outstanding swimmer, at the Olympic trials for the 1956 Melbourne Olympics, Tisue entered the 200 metre butterfly finishing sixth, though his placement was not high enough to be selected for the team.

== University of Southern California ==
Enrolling around 1956, and completing his degree in 1960, Tisue attended the University of Southern California where he competed in water polo under Coach Neal Kohlhase and swam under Head Coach Peter Daland while continuing to specialize in breaststroke. One of the leaders of the USC swim team by 1959 was Olympian Murray Rose.

== 1960 Olympic trials ==
In July, 1960, Tisue qualified for the U.S. Olympic water polo team headed for Melbourne, while playing for the Lynwood Swim Club under Head Coach Neal Kohlhase at the Los Angeles Swim Stadium. The Lynwood Club went undefeated in trial competitions, defeating the Los Angeles Swim Stadium team, and the El Segundo Swim Club teams. 1960 Olympic team mate Bob Horn would later have a very successful career as a water polo coach at UCLA and serve as a U.S. Olympic water polo coach.

== 1960 Rome Olympics ==
Tisue was a member of the American water polo team which finished seventh among sixteen competing countries in the August, 1960 Olympic water polo tournament. He played all seven matches and scored twelve total goals making him one of the highest scoring Olympic water polo players at the 1960 tournament, though Arel Zahan of the Romanian team also had twelve goals. The US water polo team played under Olympic Coaches Neal Kohlhase and Urho Saari, both inductees of the USA Water Polo Hall of Fame.

Though the U.S. had a disappointing 7-2 loss to pre-Olympic favorite Hungary in early rounds, Tisue scored a total of five goals when the U.S. team defeated the team from France with a score of 10-4. According to the Los Angeles Times, one of Tisue's goals in the game against France was scored largely as a result of his speed. Helping to advance the team to the semi-finals, the U.S. defeated the strong team from Belgium in a quarterfinal round in a 5-0 shutout, where Tisue scored 2 goals. The U.S. team lost late round match to the traditionally dominant team from Yugoslavia, 6-2 on August 31, ending their chances of contending for a medal. At the completion of the tournament, the team from Italy won the gold, Russia took the silver, and perennial favorite Hungary took the bronze.

By the mid-60's Tisue served as a Dentist in the U.S. Navy.

== Careers, avocations and marriage ==
Around 1960, Tisue worked as a lifeguard in greater Los Angeles, continuing in the role at least through the early 60's.

Tisue completed an A.B. degree from the University of Southern California in 1960. Enrolling in Dental school not long after completing college, he received a DDS Degree in 1964 from the State University of Iowa located in Ames, Iowa, his birthplace.

=== Marriage ===
Tisue married Sue Ellen Stoddard in a Naval-based ceremony around January 1, 1966 at the Presidio Post Chapel in San Francisco, while already established as a Dentist and having begun his Naval service. The couple exited the formal wedding ceremony conducted by Naval Chaplain John W. Tyler, by walking under the "canopy" of high crossed swords of a half dozen Navy veterans in white dress uniforms, three on each side. Tisue's bride Sue Stoddard was a graduate of Contra Costa College and a former resident of Richmond, California, just North of San Francisco in Central Coastal California, making the wedding closer to the Bride's family. The couple planned a honeymoon skiing in Alta, Utah, a state where Tisue would later spend some of his retirement.

=== Dental career ===
By 1967, Tisue worked as a Dentist in California's South Bay. Holder of a DDS Degree, Tisue continued practicing Dentistry, in Torrance, California through around 2005, and had served as a President of the Western Dental Society's local committee for peer review. He continued his practice on Crenshaw Avenue in Torrance for over 30 years.

Continuing to excel in multiple swim strokes in later years, at 54 Tisue had a time of 1:03.56 in the 100 Individual Medley swimming for California's South Bay Masters in 1991. Remaining active at 80, while a resident of Eden, Utah, in 2019, Tisue completed the Dwight Crum two-mile open water Pier to Pier race from California's Hermosa Beach to Manhattan Beach. A loyal open water enthusiast, Tisue had completed the race annually for over fifty years, since the event began in 1963.
