= Charles McIlroy =

American water polo player (born 1938)

Chick McIlroy
Personal information
- Full name: Charles Raymond McIlroy
- National team: USA
- Born: August 1, 1938 (age 87) Minot, North Dakota
- Occupation(s): Schoolteacher; High School Water Polo Coach; Lifeguard

Sport
- Country: USA
- Sport: Water polo
- Position: Attacker/perimeter player (WP)
- College team: El Camino; Long Beach State
- Club: El Segundo Swim Club; Lynwood Water Polo Club
- Coached by: Urho Saari (El Segundo High, 60, 64 Olympics)

Charles Raymond "Chick" McIlroy (born August 1, 1938) is an American water polo player who competed for Long Beach State University in greater Los Angeles, and participated in the 1960 Summer Olympics in Rome as an alternate and in the 1964 Summer Olympics in Tokyo where the U.S. team placed ninth overall. After his elite athletic career ended, he had a 39 year career as a school teacher and water polo coach in the Palos Verdes School District, and worked as a Redondo Beach life guard after retiring as a schoolteacher.

== Early life ==
He was born in Minot, North Dakota, on August 1, 1938 and moved with his family to El Segundo, California when he was one. Charles was one of ten children born to Kenneth McIlroy and Helen (Vadnais) McIlroy. He was the fifth son of eight boys, having two sisters.

McIlroy swam and played water polo at El Segundo High School where he was managed and trained by coach Urho Saari, a USA Water Polo Hall of Fame member.

=== Collegiate years ===
Prior to college, around the age of 18, Mcilroy practiced with the 1956 U.S. Water Polo team as they trained for the Melbourne Olympics, which greatly improved his game, and his level of skill. After High School, beginning around the fall of 1956, Charles swam and played water polo at El Camino Jr. College, where he swam for Coach Harry Perry, and competed in the Individual Medley and the backstroke. By 1957, he had been honored as a first team All-Metro water polo player. McIlroy transferred to play for the strong program at Long Beach State University.

== Olympics ==
=== 1960 Rome Olympics ===
He joined the nearby Lynwood Water Polo Club to train for the 1960 Olympics and was part of the Lynwood club when they won the Olympic qualifying tournament. However, as he was an alternate on the 1960 team, he remained on the bench, and was unable to participate in the Olympic games, and there were no substitutions allowed in 1960.

As an alternate, McIlroy travelled to Rome as a member of the American water polo team, which finished seventh in the water polo competition in Rome, though as noted, he did not participate. With sixteen teams participating, pre-games favorite Italy took the gold medal, the team from the Soviet Union took the silver, and Hungary took the bronze.

=== 1964 Tokyo Olympics ===
Four years later at the 1964 Olympics in Tokyo, managed again by Olympic Coach Urho Saari, the United States water polo team was eliminated in the first round, and later placed ninth overall. In the 1964 Olympic tournament, McIlroy played three matches. In their first game, the U.S. team lost to a strong, tall and dominant team from Yugoslavia 2-1, where water polo was a major sport. In their second game, they defeated the team from Brazil 7-1, but were defeated by the team from the Netherlands, losing their chance to advance to the semi-finals. After semi-final play, pre-games favorite Hungary took the gold medal, Yugoslavia took the silver, and the Soviet Union took the bronze. Charles's two brothers, Paul McIlroy and Ned McIlroy were also on the 1964 U.S. water polo team, though Paul did not play in competition.

In non-Olympic international competition, McIlroy won a team gold medal in water polo at the 1959 Pan American championships in Chicago IL, and a silver medal at the 1963 Pan American championships in Sao Paulo, Brazil.

=== Post athletic life and careers ===
McIlroy married and had children. After his Olympic career, he worked as a schoolteacher and water polo coach in the Palos Verdes School District for just under 40 years. After retiring from his career as a teacher, he worked as a Lifeguard part-time in the Redondo Beach area.

In 2008 at the age of 70, Charles was a member of the Tri Valley Water polo Club that competed in the World Masters Water polo Tournament in Perth Australia. The team Charles played on won all seven of their games in the 60+ division, earning them the gold medal in their age group.

=== Honors ===
In 1980, he was inducted into the USA Water Polo Hall of Fame. Honored during his water polo career, he was a 1959, 1960, and 1964 All American in outdoor water polo, and a 1958-59 Most Valuable Player nominee.
