= Clement Browne =

American water polo player (1896–1964)

Personal information
- Full name: Clement Adolbert Browne
- Nationality: American
- Born: January 4, 1896 Freetown, Antigua and Barbuda
- Died: January 1964 New York, New York, United States

Sport
- Sport: Water polo
- Club: Chicago Athletic Association (CAA)
- Coached by: Harry Hazelhurst (CAA); Otto Wahle '20 Olympics WP

Clement Adolbert Browne (January 4, 1896 – January 1964) was an American swimmer and water polo player. He competed in the men's water polo tournament at the 1920 Summer Olympics in Antwerp that placed fourth overall.

== Early life ==
Browne was born January 4, 1896 in Freetown, St. Philip, Antigua. According to ancestry.com, his parents were Joshua Brown, and Frederica C. Hughes, and he was married to Beatrice Fuller. He was known to have entered the United States in April 1919 through the city of St. John in Canada's New Brunswick. He was not fully an American citizen when he represented the U.S. at the 1920 Olympics in Antwerp, but became a U.S. citizen in 1925, when he completed the process of naturalization.

In 1915, Browne represented Chicago's Hamilton Athletic Club (HAC). Representing the HAC at the late June, 1915 Central Swimming Championships at the Broad Ripple Park Pool in Chicago, sanctioned by the American Athletic Union, Brown set a regional record for the one mile swim with a time of 25:59.4, placing first as the high point scorer for the meet. His time was within one nineteen seconds of the American record. In 1916, he defeated Perry McGillivary in the half mile event at the AAU Central Championships. Browne later played water polo and swam representing the better-known Chicago Athletic Association. By 1920, while competing for the Chicago Athletic Association, one of his coaches was Harry Hazelhurst. Through 1923, Browne excelled as both a sprint and middle distance swimmer in regional competition, but received limited recognition, as he failed to win a national championship.

Though he was selected to compete in individual events at the 1920 Olympic swimming trials at Lincoln Park Lagoon in Chicago, under the auspices of the Chicago Athletic Association, Browne did not qualify in a swimming event.

== 1920 Antwerp Olympics ==
Browne was part of the American water polo team in the 1920 Antwerp Olympics which finished fourth in the Olympic Men's water polo tournament. The US water polo team was coached by Austrian-born American swimmer Otto Wahle, a 1900 and 1904 Olympic medalist and Water Polo Hall of Fame inductee. Great Britain, and the hometown team from Belgium were early favorites to medal in the tournament. The American team defeated Greece in the first Water Polo Match of the Quarterfinals 7-0, on August 24, but lost to Great Britain in the Semi-finals 7-2, eliminating them from the final round. The U.S. team later defeated Belgium 7-2 in a consolation round to determine the 2nd to 5th place finishers. Great Britain took the gold medal, Belgium took the silver, and Sweden took the bronze.

Browne later worked for the US Post Office.

He died in New York in January 1964.
