= Herbert Taylor (swimmer) =

American swimmer (1892–1965)

Personal information
- Full name: George Herbert Taylor
- National team: United States
- Born: June 7, 1892 Chicago, Illinois, U.S.
- Died: January 16, 1965 (aged 72) Chicago, Illinois, U.S.
- Height: 5 ft 7 in (1.70 m)

Sport
- Sport: Swimming
- Strokes: Breaststroke, water polo
- Club: Chicago Athletic Association
- College team: University of Wisconsin
- Coach: Hindman (Wisconsin); Otto Wahle (Olympics)

George Herbert Taylor (June 7, 1892 – January 16, 1965) was an American competition swimmer and water polo player who represented the United States at the 1920 Summer Olympics in Antwerp, Belgium.

Taylor was born June 7, 1892 in Chicago, Illinois, and trained and competed with the highly competitive Chicago Athletic Association, where he was part of championship water polo teams that won National titles in 1927 and 1918. In swimming, he specialized in breast-stroke events. He graduated the University of Wisconsin in 1915, where he participated in varsity swimming and football, chaired the Junior Prom committee, and was a member of the "W" Club, and Chi Psi Fraternity. In his Senior year as a Varsity swimmer for Wisconsin, he held records in the 100 and 200-yard breast stroke events, and served as Captain of the swim team, under swim Coach Hindman.

== 1920 Antwerp Olympics ==
At the 1920 Antwerp Olympics, Taylor swam in the preliminary heats of the men's 200-meter breaststroke and finished sixteenth overall. Swedish swimmer Hakan Malmrot took the gold with nearly a five second margin, and another Swede Thor Henning took the silver.

He also was part of the U.S. water polo team that finished sixth. The 1920 team was coached by Austrian-born American swimmer Otto Wahle, a 1900 and 1904 Olympic medalist and Water Polo Hall of Fame inductee. Great Britain, and the hometown team from Belgium were early favorites to medal in the tournament. The American team defeated Greece in the first Water Polo Match of the Quarterfinals 7-0, on August 24, but lost to Great Britain in the Semi-finals 7-2, eliminating them from the final round. The U.S. team later defeated Belgium 7-2 in a consolation round to determine the 2nd to 5th place finishers. Great Britain took the gold medal, Belgium took the silver, and Sweden took the bronze.

In his primary career from 1944-1963, he worked for Chicago's American Furniture Mart.

Taylor died at age 72 on Saturday, January 16, 1965 at Chicago's Grant Hospital. He had been an active member of the Inland Lake Yachting Association, and helped found the Sailing School at the Lake Geneva Yachting Club.

== See also ==
- List of University of Wisconsin–Madison people
