= Ralph Whitney =

American water polo player (born 1936)

Personal information
- Full name: Ralph John Whitney
- Nationality: American
- Born: October 30, 1936 (age 89) Fontana, California, United States
- Height: 180 cm (5 ft 11 in)
- Weight: 75 kg (165 lb)

Sport
- Sport: Water polo
- Position: Driver, Perimeter player (WP)
- College team: El Camino College
- Club: El Segundo Swim Club
- Coached by: Urho Saari (El Segundo, Olympics)

Ralph John Whitney (born October 30, 1936) is a former American swimmer and water polo player who played for El Segundo Swim Club and El Camino College. He competed in the men's water polo tournament at the 1964 Tokyo Olympics where the US men's team placed ninth overall.

== Early life ==
Whiteney was born October 30, 1936 in Fontana, California. He attended El Segundo High School, graduating in 1954 where his primary coach was Urho Saari. Saari, a USA Water Polo Hall of Fame inductee, coached El Segundo High School and El Segundo Swim Club from 1942-1973, taking time off during WWII from 1944-1946. Between 1940-1978, El Segundo High won eighteen CIF Championships, which included twelve in water polo and six in swimming. The team won its first water polo championship in 1947, won the Southern California League Championship in 1950, and won the CIF Southern Section championship against Downey High with a score of 3-1, in 1954, the last year Whitney competed with the El Segundo Water Polo team. Saari coached at El Camino College from 1948-1955. Outside of his High School water polo team, Whitney trained with El Segundo Swim Club where he was also coached by Saari.

== El Camino College ==
Whitney attended El Camino College officially from 1956-57, though he may have played water polo and participated in swimming representing El Camino from around 1954-1957, partly under the training of coach Urho Saari. In the 1950's, El Camino athletes had more flexible rules for playing eligibility, particularly if they took longer to graduate than two years. Whitney set a National Junior college swimming record in the 200 yard breaststroke in 1955. In 1954, Whitney received honors as a second team All Southern California Junior College selection. He was inducted into the El Camino Athletic Hall of Honor in 2005. During his collegiate career, and well as his Olympic career, he played primarily field positions, which utilized his speed and height for perimeter shooting and passing, and he was not known to play center or goalkeeper.

As a coach, Saari stressed fast swimming to allow fast transitions from offense to defense and the reverse, deft ball handling, and high level conditioning. He stressed shooting from the perimeter players, reducing the reliance on the 2-meter center position player.

== 1964 Tokyo Olympics ==
Whitney participated in the men's water polo tournament at the 1964 Tokyo Olympics under Olympic Head Coach Urho Saari that was eliminated in the first round of the 1964 Olympic tournament in Tokyo, finishing in ninth place overall among thirteen competing countries. Members of the team included the brothers Paul, Ned and Chick McIlroy, and Urho Saari's son Bob Saari. In their first game, the Americans lost to a strong, tall and dominant team from Yugoslavia 2-1, where water polo was a major sport. The U.S. team was tied 1-1 with the team from Yugoslavia throughout the first half, with the Yugoslavians not taking the winning shot until the last four minutes of play in the second half. In their next game, the American team defeated the team from Brazil 7-1, but were subsequently defeated 4-6 by the team from the Netherlands, losing their chance to advance to the semi-finals. In an unusual twist, in the losing game against the Netherlands, American goalie Tony Van Dorp, played against his brother Fred van Dorp. Tony Van Dorp had played for the Dutch Team before coming to America and gaining citizenship in 1957. After semi-final play, pre-games and perennial favorite Hungary took the gold medal, Yugoslavia took the silver, and the Soviet Union took the bronze.

=== Careers ===
During the time of the 1964 Olympics, Whitney worked as a fireman, and may have remained in a few public safety positions. Whitney left California, but came back to the area in 1990, and lived in greater Santa Barbara where he started Whitney Ranch. He and his wife grew avocados, blueberries and lemons, and had bee hives at the Ranch.
