= Herbert Topp =

American water polo player (1900–1994)

- A youthful Topp as an athlete around age 25

Personal information
- Full name: Herbert Reitzel Topp
- Nationality: Danish-born American
- Born: April 20, 1900 Copenhagen, Denmark
- Died: May 6, 1994 (aged 94) St. Louis, Missouri, United States
- Education: Lane Technical School
- Spouses: Esther Louise Jacobs Topp; Audrey Vitt Topp
- Children: Herbert Topp Jr. and William Topp

Sport
- Sport: Water polo
- Position: Forward (WP)
- Club: Chicago Athletic Association (CAA)
- Coached by: Harry Hazelhurst (CAA); Perry McGillivray (1928 Olympics)

Herbert Reitzel Topp (April 20, 1900 – May 6, 1994) was a Danish-born American swimmer and water polo player who competed for the Chicago Athletic Association. He held an AAU National record in the 50-yard freestyle by 1924, and participated in the men's water polo tournament at the 1928 Summer Olympics in Amsterdam, Holland.

== Early life ==
Topp was born April 20, 1900 in Copenhagen, Denmark, but came to the U.S. as a young man. By 1917, he attended Chicago's Lane Technical School, a public school in North Chicago founded in 1908. At 18, when he registered for the US Military draft, he had not yet gained US citizenship. At the age of 17, at the preliminaries of the Chicago Interscholastic Swimming Meet, Topp represented Lane Technical School, where he won the 40-yard freestyle with a time of 20.6 seconds and placed second in the 100-yard backstroke. In more competitive training, he swam and played water polo for the Chicago Athletic Association, where one of his water polo or swim coaches likely included Harry Hazelhurst by 1920. He set a pool record for the 40-yard swim of 19.2 seconds in an exhibition race at the Hamilton Club Pool in November, 1918. He set a local record for the 100-yard distance of 56 seconds in an exhibition at the Union League Pool in January, 1919.

Topp was chosen to compete in swimming and possibly water polo at the 1920 Antwerp Olympic trails around July 18, 1920 at the Lincoln Park Lagoon in Chicago by CAA instructor Harry Hazelhurst but was not selected for the final team.

== 1924 Paris Olympic trials ==
In April, 1924, Topp was selected as one of around eight players to practice in New York hoping for selection to the U.S. Water Polo Team after performing well at the championship water polo game in Chicago that partly served as a pre-Olympic trial. Other players selected from Topp's Chicago Athletic Club included Fred Daniels and Herbert Norton. Bud Wallen, Oliver Horn, Fred Town, and George Lauer were chosen from the rival Illinois Athletic Club, and two players, Hall Vollmer and Tedford Cann were chosen from the strong New York Athletic Club water polo program.

Not attending the mid-July, 1924 Paris Olympics, Topp competed in the Illinois Swimming and Diving Championships in July 1924, at Chicago's Edgewater Beach, already holding the National AAU record in the 50-yard freestyle event.

== Central AAU Water Polo Championship ==
Perhaps peaking in his skills at age 28, Topp was part of the Chicago Athletic Association team that defeated the strong team from the Illinois Athletic Club 11–9 at the Central American Athletic Union Championship on March 9, 1928. As the leading scorer, Topp was credited with nine goals and played Forward in the victory that went overtime at the Lakeshore Athletic Club. In a close game, he scored three of his nine goals in the last 53 seconds of the overtime period.

== 1928 Amsterdam Olympics ==
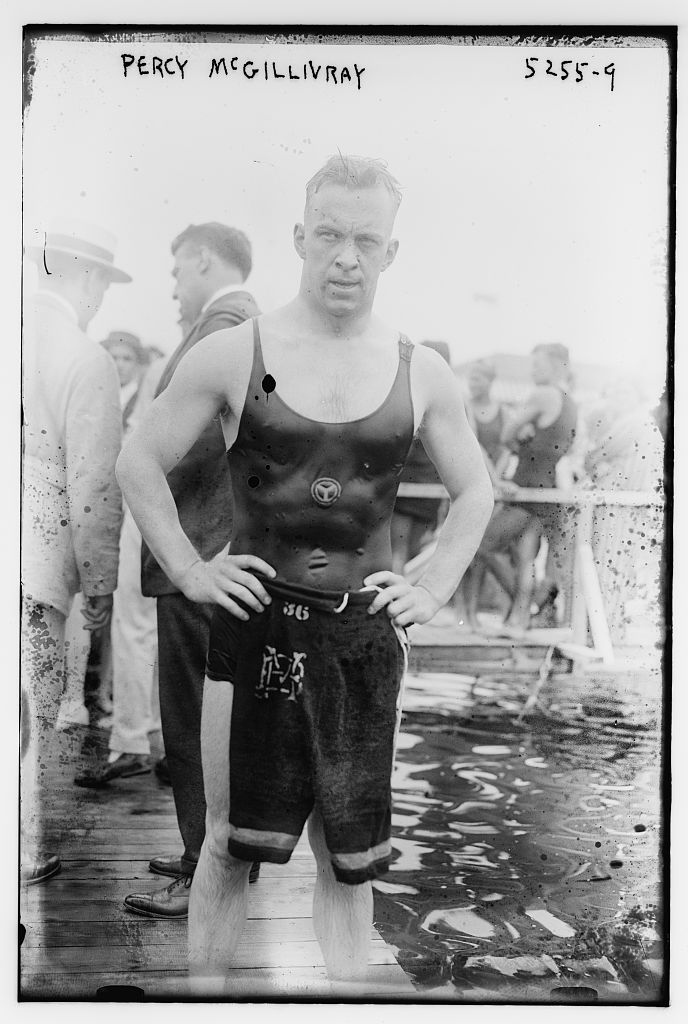
Olympic Coach McGillivray

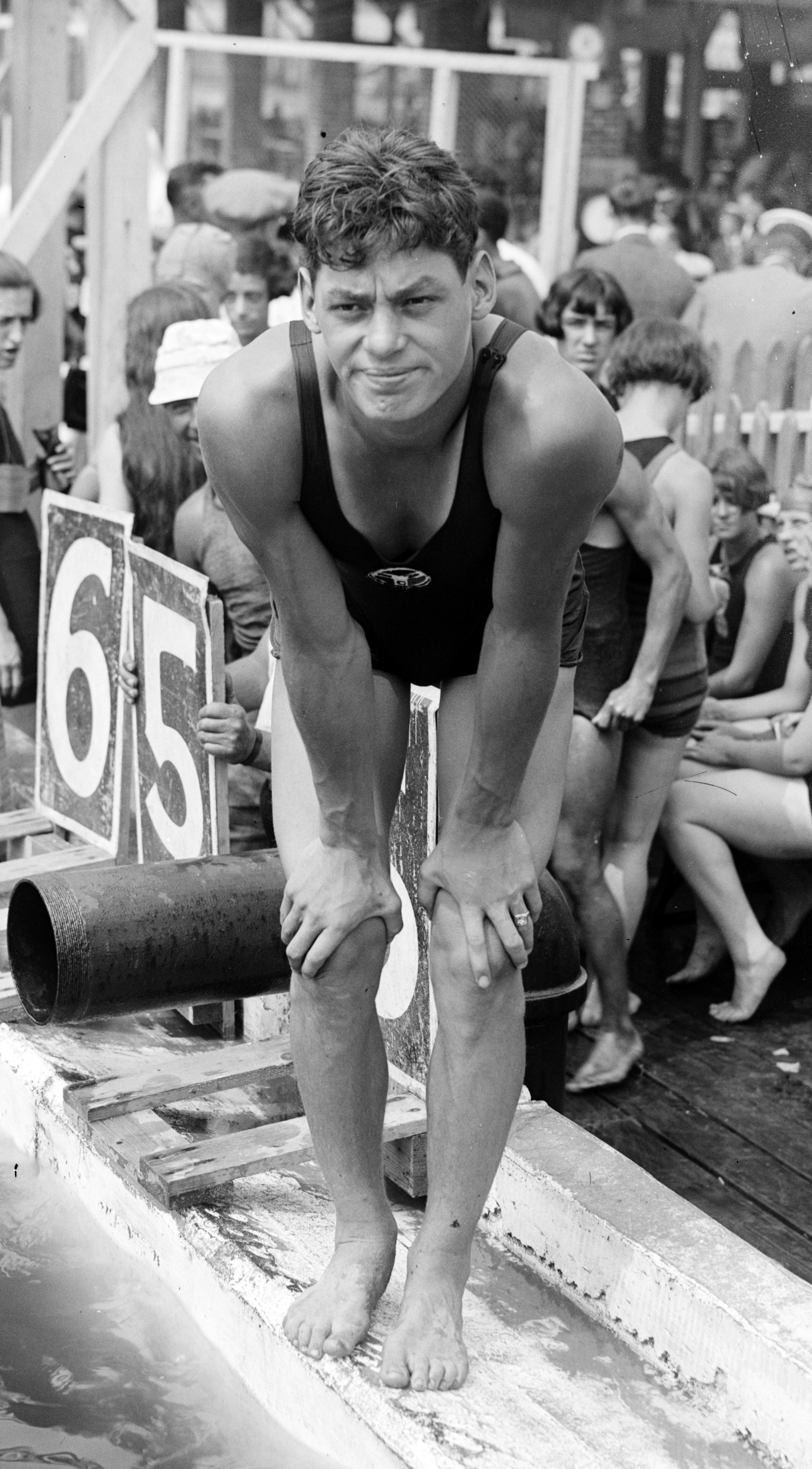
Weissmuller, 1922

Topp participated with the US water polo team at the 1928 Amsterdam Olympics where he was coached by former Olympian Perry McGillivray. Sam Greller, who would later coach the Illinois Athletic Club was one of Topp's Olympic teammates in 1928, as was team Captain George Mitchell, who competed in water polo for University of California, Berkeley. His best-known water polo teammate in 1928 was likely future film star Johnny Weissmuller. The US swim team was under the management of U.S. Olympic Coach William Bachrach, a Hall of Fame member. Subsequent to a first round bye, the American water polo team had to play against Hungary, the world's top ranked team, and a dominant team in subsequent years as well.

In their preliminary water polo game at the 1928 Olympics in which Topp competed, the Americans were shut out by pre-Olympic favorite Hungary in a 5–0 loss. The German team took the gold medal, and the Hungarians captured the silver. In a semi-final bout, the U.S. team lost to France 2-1 who took the bronze medal. The U.S. team finished in seventh place or technically part of a three-way tie for fifth place overall.

Topp died May 6, 1994 at the age of 96 in St. Louis, Missouri. He had been married to Esther Louise Jacobs Topp, who predeceased him in May, 1964, and later to Audrey Vitt Topp. Children from his first marriage included Herbert Topp Jr. and William Topp. Topp's funeral was at the Kutiss Afton Chapel on Gravois on mid-day, May 10, and he was buried at Sunset Memorial Park outside St. Louis.
