= Alex Rousseau (water polo) =

American water polo player (born 1967)

Personal information
- Nationality: French-born American citizen ('85)
- Born: November 4, 1967 (age 58) Paris, France
- Height: 195 cm (6 ft 5 in)
- Weight: 91 kg (201 lb)
- Spouse: Jennifer Demyan (m. 2019)

Sport
- Sport: Water polo
- College team: University of California Los Angeles
- Club: Harvard Club, New York Athletic Club
- Coached by: Bob Horn (UCLA); Bill Barnett (92 Olympics); Richard Corso (96 Olympics)
Medal record
Representing United States
Pan American Games
Gold medal – first place	1995 Mar del Plata	Team competition

Alex Dominique Rousseau (born November 4, 1967) is an American former water polo player who competed for the University of California Los Angeles. He participated in the 1992 Summer Olympics in Barcelona and the 1996 Summer Olympics in Atlanta. Rousseau worked as a Los Angeles County lifeguard, model and actor, and later traded equities with the Jones Trading Company.

Roussea was born November 4, 1967 in Paris, France, though in his youth his family moved to Canada and then California. He attended Southern California's Santa Monica High School in greater Los Angeles where he competed in Water Polo from around 1982-1985. In February 1985, as a High School Senior, he received honors as a member of the Class 3A All-Southern California Water Polo team by the Southern California WP Association of Coaches. He gained full American citizenship in 1985. Subsequent to his High School career, he competed for the U.S. Jr. National Water Polo team from 1987 to 1988.

== University California Los Angeles ==
From 1985 to 1990, he attended and played water polo for the University of California Los Angeles, under long serving Water Polo Hall of Fame Head Coach Bob Horn, a former player for Long Beach State, who also served as an Olympic coach. Rousseau captained the team in 1989, and was team high scorer in each of the four years he played. He received All American honors at UCLA in four years, and was a 1989 NCAA Most Valuable Player. He helped take UCLA to an NCAA national championship in 1989, as a decisive player in a 13–10 win over semi-final opponent University of Southern California, where he was credited with a game-changing eight goals.

== Olympics ==
=== 1992 Barcelona Olympics ===
Rousseau participated in the 1992 Barcelona Olympics under Head Olympic Coach Bill Barnett where the US team placed fourth overall among 12 competing countries. Spain and Yugoslavia were the strong pre-Olympic favorites. In an important preliminary game with the German team essential to get the U.S. team to the semi-finals, Rousseau scored two second half goals to lead the U.S. team to a 7–2 win.

In semi-final play, the U.S. team had a disappointing close loss to Spain 6-4, and Italy defeated the European Unified Team 9-8. The final match between Italy and Spain became the longest ever played in Olympic history with Italy finally winning the gold after six overtimes. Spain took the silver medal, and the Unified team took the bronze.

=== 1996 Atlanta Olympics ===
He later participated in the 1996 Atlanta Olympics, under Head Coach Richard Corso where the US team placed seventh overall among 12 competing countries. Though Hungary and Italy were the strong pre-Olympic favorites, Spain defeated Hungary 7–6 in the semi-finals. In the final game Spain beat Croatia, and captured the gold medal with a score of 7-5, leaving Croatia the silver medal, and pre-game favorite Italy the bronze.

In high level national championship play, he was part of both outdoor and indoor water polo teams that were United States Water Polo U.S. Champions, was voted a Most Valuable Player at national championships twice, playing on a total of nine teams that won national championships.

==== International competition highlights ====
He played for the USA Water Polo Senior National Water Polo Team from 1988 to 1996, where he participated in 175 international games. In international non-Olympic competition, he competed on FINA World Cup Teams. In 1989, 1993, and 1995 he was also part of the World University Games teams. In his more memorable tournaments, he won a team gold medal in water polo at the 1991 Summer Universiade in Sheffield, and in the Pan American Games, he was with the US National team that won the gold medal in Mara del Plata in 1995.

=== Careers ===
After his elite career ended, he remained active in water polo as a Masters's competitor.

In career pursuits, he has worked as a Lifeguard for Los Angeles County Beaches, and in his youth worked as a model. He appeared in the 1994 Sports Illustrated swimsuit edition, and on the television program “Baywatch”. In the business world, he later traded Equities, working for Jones Trading Company. His multi-lingual background in English, French, Spanish and Italian likely aided him as an international water polo player and professional and as an equities broker in the broader business community.

He played professional water polo for C.N. Marseilles and Rome's Lazio Nuoto from 1990 to 1993, and 1997-1999 respectively.

Rousseau married Jenifer Demyan on November 2, 2019 in New Jersey's Forked River.

=== Honors ===
In 2004, he was inducted into the USA Water Polo Hall of Fame. A high scoring standout during his collegiate years, Rousseau was inducted into the UCLA Hall of Fame in 2011.
