= Omar Amr =

American water polo player (born 1974)

Personal information
- Born: September 20, 1974 (age 52) Bellflower, California, United States
- Education: University California Irvine; Harvard Medical School
- Occupation: Physician
- Height: 180 cm (5 ft 11 in)
- Weight: 92 kg (203 lb)

Sport
- Sport: Water polo
- College team: University of California, Irvine
- Club: Newport Harbor Water Polo Club
- Coached by: Ted Newland (UC Irvine); Ratko Rudic (Olympics)
Medal record
Representing United States
Pan American Games
Gold medal – first place	2003 Santo Domingo	Team competition

Omar Amr (born September 20, 1974) is a former water polo player who competed for the University of California, Irvine. He played for the United States national team at the 2004 Summer Olympics in Athens that placed seventh overall. He attended Harvard Medical School, coached swimming and water polo for a year at the Massachusetts Institute of Technology (MIT), and later worked as a physician in Orange County, California.

== Early life ==
Amr was born September 20, 1974 in Bellflower, California to Egyptian immigrant parents who came to the US in 1952. From an athletic family, his father had competed in water polo for the Egyptian National team and his younger sister Aleah would also play High School water polo. Like his siblings, Amr began swimming at a very young age, and played with a club water polo team by Junior High having learned the game as a youngster from his father. Amr attended Sunny Hills High School in Fullerton where he competed for his High School swimming and water polo teams. A multi-stroke swimming competitor, in early May 1992, he won the 200 Individual Medley representing Sunny Hills High with a time of 1:59.53, and the 100 breaststroke with a 1:02.37 to help lead his High School team to the Freeway League's Boy's Swimming Championship title.

A notably strong water polo program, by October 1991, the Sunny Hills team had won 120 consecutive water polo games in the Freeway League over 22 seasons. Sunny Hills had the longest winning streak in CIF Southern Section water polo history. They broke their winning streak in October 1991, losing to Buena Park High School 7-6, though Amr's late goal at the buzzer to bring Sunny Hills to a tie was disallowed for being too late. In September, 1993, Sunny Hills water polo was rated second in the CIF Southern Section Division II coaches rating. Amr believed he improved his swimming and water polo skills in his Senior year partly due to a growth spurt, and by joining a club team, where more focused training helped him to drop his swim times.

== University of California Irvine ==
From 1993 to 1996, Amr swam and played water polo at the University of California, Irvine, under long-serving coach Ted Newland where he consistently attended both morning and evening practices. Not a strongly recruited player, he missed the water polo team try-out, and began as a walk-on. Within a few minutes of his first practice, he had his nose broken in a rough encounter. To stay academically competitive, Amr would often study at Coach Newland's house after practice. Adapting to the demands of the team at UC Irvine, Amr was twice a second-team All-American water polo team selection in 1995 and 1996 and an honorable mention All-American selection in 1994. He received his degree in biology in 1997. A solid student, through his Senior year, Amr maintained a 3.6 grade point average at UCI. He suffered with rotator cuff issues, lacking an off season as both a water polo and swim athlete. Despite his injuries, Coach Newland considered him one of the fastest swimmers on the team in his Senior season, and a very strong player on defense. Beginning around 1995, Amr competed with the US National team through 2000 after graduating UC Irvine.

== Olympics ==
Amr trained for the 2000 Sydney Olympics on a one-year deferment granted to him from Harvard Medical School who also offered him a scholarship. He was one of the final players cut from the 2000 Olympic Water Polo Men's Team owing to a late injury to his knee which included damage to the anterior cruciate ligament. His recovery required physical therapy for nine months which focused largely on strength training, but kept him from intensive pool training.

While training for the 2004 Olympics, Amr continued to attend Harvard Medical School, and would make weekend cross-country flights from Boston to Orange County, California to train with his Olympic teammates. Amr did his medical residency at University of California Irvine.

=== 2004 Athens Olympics ===
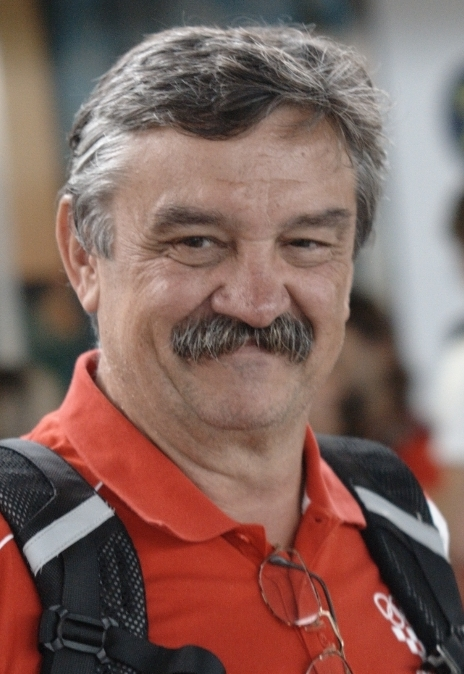
Ratko Rudic, 2012

Amr made the 2004 US Olympic Water Polo team for the Athens Olympics due in part to improvements in his strength, speed, and defensive play. After a disappointing 9–7 loss to Russia in the preliminary rounds, the US team lost 9–4 to Serbia Montenegro, ending their chances for a place in the quarterfinals, though Amr scored a goal. At the tournament's end, the US team placed seventh overall under Head Coach Ratko Rudić. Pre-Olympic favorites Hungary earned the gold, Serbia and Montenegro won the silver, and the Russian Federation took the bronze medal.

In international competition, having clearly recovered from his 2000 knee injury, Amr played in the 2003 Pan American Water Polo Team competition at the Pan American games that won the gold medal in Santo Domingo in 2003.

In service to the community, Amr founded the Alliance for Diversity and Equity, for athletes who associated with the Black, Indigenous, and People of Color (BIPOC) minority community.

== Honors ==
IN September, 1997, in his collegiate Senior year, Amr was a recipient of the Arthur Ashe Jr. Sports Scholar Award.

== Careers ==
After the Olympics, Amr coached the MIT Men's Water Polo team during the 2004 season while finishing his medical degree at Harvard.

Beginning in 2020, Amr served as an emergency room physician with practices in Orange County and Stockton, California.
