= History of water polo =

The history of water polo as a team sport began in mid 19th-century England and Scotland, where water sports were a feature of county fairs and festivals.

== Development of the game ==
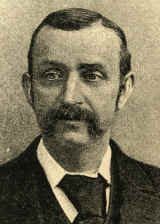
William Wilson, Scottish aquatics pioneer and originator of the first rules of water polo.

The rules of water polo were originally developed in the mid-nineteenth century in Great Britain by William Wilson, a British journalist, swimming instructor, and coach. Wilson was also the author of The Swimming Instructor, one of the earliest books on swimming. He invented the game while working at the Arlington Baths Club in Glasgow.

The game originated as a form of rugby football played in rivers and lakes in England and Scotland with a ball constructed of India rubber, probably from the 1850s onwards. This ‘water rugby’ came to be called ‘water polo’ based on the English pronunciation of the Tibetan Balti language word pulu, which means ‘ball’. Early play allowed brute strength, wrestling and holding opposing players underwater to recover the ball; the goalie stood outside the playing area and defended the goal by jumping in on any opponent attempting to score by placing the ball on the deck.

In the first edition (1893) of their book Swimming, Archibald Sinclair and William Henry state "On May 12, 1870, a committee was appointed by the Swimming Association, then known as the London Swimming Association, to draw up a code of rules for the management of the game of ‘football in the water.’ " This indicates that forms of the sport we now call ‘water polo’ existed before the current name was in common use. Other names included ‘water base ball’ and (more frequently) ‘aquatic football’. For example, in the South Eastern Gazette (in Kent; now closed), on Tues 28 July 1857, it says "An aquatic foot-ball match is fixed for to-morrow, Wednesday".

One of the earliest recorded games of a sport called ‘water polo’ occurred at the Crystal Palace (London), on 15 September 1873. It was reported in the Morning Post (now closed) and The Standard (later London Evening Standard). The weather was "cold and raw" according to the Penny Illustrated News. It was held in the boating lake that still exists. It was part of the 4th Open Air Fete of the London Swimming Club (founded in 1859).

The modern game also developed in Scotland in the late 19th century, when the first games of water polo were played at the Arlington Baths Club in Glasgow (the Club was founded in 1870, and still exists today). In 1886, the Scottish Amateur Swimming Association (Western) held their first championship, the West Cup. West of Scotland beat South Side 1-0. This is probably the first club tournament in the world, and is still played for today.

The Swimming Association of Great Britain (SAGB; forerunner of the Amateur Swimming Association, of England) recognised the sport on 13 April 1885. Canada was one of the first countries outside the United Kingdom to adopt the sport. The Midland (of England) Counties Swimming and Aquatic Football Association probably set up the first water polo league in the world. Their first champions, in 1884, were Birmingham Leander who beat Hanley 1-0.

The first national club championships (in England) were played in 1888. Burton Amateur Club defeated Otter Swimming Club 3–0 in the Old Lambert Baths in London. Burton Amateur was formed in 1878, and still exists today. Otter was formed in London in 1869; and also still exists today, with male and female water polo teams. Though originally it was a male-only swimming club. The London Water Polo League, encouraged by the Otter Club, was formed in 1889. In that year, Nautilus were the first champions, defeating Otter 2-0. The next league was the Northern Counties. Their first champions were Manchester Osborne, who beat Manchester Leaf Street 4-1, in 1892. The longest running single match is the annual one between Oxford and Cambridge universities, which was first played on 16 October 1891, at the Old Crown Baths, Kensington Oval, London when Oxford won 4–1.

The first international water polo match was between England and Scotland at the Kensington Baths in London, on 28 July 1890. Scotland won 4–0. The England team were F Browne, WG Carrey, HF Clark, JF Genders, William Henry, J Finegan and JL Mayger. The referee was Archibald Sinclair (who also founded the London Water Polo league) from Ranelagh Harriers, England. William Henry (1859-1928) and Archibald Sinclair (1866-1922) went on to publish a book called ‘Swimming’ (Longmans & Co, London) in 1893. It included a chapter on water polo and may be the first book to have a chapter on the subject.

=== Outside England and Scotland ===
By the 1880s, the game stressed swimming, passing, and scoring by shooting into a goal net; players could only be tackled when holding the ball and could not be taken under water. Canada was one of the first countries outside Britain to adopt the sport. The Montreal Swimming Club which had formed in 1876 formed a water polo team in 1887 and games were played in the St. Lawrence River along the shore of St. Helen's Island.

In 1888, the sport was brought to the USA, by John Robinson, an English swimming instructor; by organising a team at the Boston Athletic Association. Two years later, J.H. Smith and Arnold Heilban started a team at the Sydenham Swimmers Club (later at the Metropole AC) in Providence, Rhode Island. In the autumn of the same year (1890) the New York Athletic Club (NYAC) introduced the game to members. The first US championships were held on 28 January 1890, in Providence, when Sydenham Swimmers Club defeated Boston Athletic Association by 2:1.

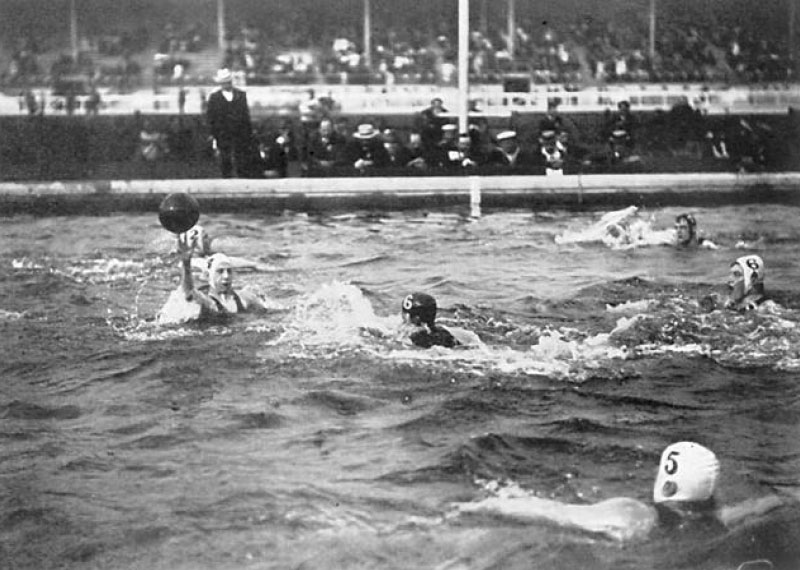
Water polo final at the 1908 Summer Olympics

Between 1890 and 1900, the game developed in Europe, spreading to Hungary in 1889, Belgium in 1890, Austria and Germany in 1894 and France in 1895, using British rules. A different game was being played in the United States, characterized by rough play, holding, diving underwater, and soft, semi-inflated ball that could be gripped tightly and carried underwater. In 1900, the sport of water polo was added to the program of the Olympics – the first team sport to be added. Due to the different codes, European teams did not compete. By 1914, most US teams agreed to conform to international rules. An international water polo committee was formed in 1929, consisting of representatives from Great America and the International Amateur Swimming Federation (FINA). Rules were developed for international matches and put into effect in 1930; FINA has been the international governing body for the sport since that time.

Over the years, both technical and rule changes affected the character of the game. In 1928, Hungarian water polo coach Béla Komjádi invented the "air pass", or "dry pass", a technique in which a player directly passes the ball through the air to another player, who receives it without the ball hitting the water. Previously, players would let the ball drop in the water first and then reach out for it, but the dry pass made the offensive game more dynamic, and contributed to Hungarian dominance of water polo for 60 years. In 1936, James R. ("Jimmy") Smith, California water polo coach and author of several books on water polo mechanics, developed a water polo ball made with an inflatable bladder and a rubber fabric cover, which improved performance. The previous leather ball absorbed water and became heavier during the game. In 1949, rule changes allowed play to continue uninterrupted after a referee whistled an ordinary foul, speeding up play. In the 1970s, the exclusion foul replaced a point system for major fouls; players guilty of this foul were excluded for a 1-minute penalty and their team forced to play with fewer players. Possession of the ball was limited to 45 seconds before a scoring attempt. Time of penalties and possession has been reduced since then. The direct shot on goal from the seven (7) meter line after a free throw was allowed in 1994, and changed to a five-meter shot in 2005.

=== Local rule variations ===
United States

In 2006, revisions were made to the NFHS 2006–2007 swimming/diving and water polo rulebook (USWP and NCAA rules still vary). The four and seven-meter lines were merged to a five-meter line. Under the revised rules, a goalkeeper may use two hands and stand on the bottom of the pool (if shallow) until the 5-meter line, and go beyond the 5-meter line according to the field rules (one hand on the ball no standing), but still not pass the half line. The goalie may strike the ball with a clenched fist, although this is not recommended.

New cap rules were also enacted. A goalie cap must now be in quarters alternating red/dark for home and red/white for away. The goalie must be number 1 or 13. For women, a red swim cap must be worn under the goalie cap. A team's dark swim cap is no longer acceptable as it is hard to distinguish a goalie from field players if official cap is off.

== Olympic competition ==
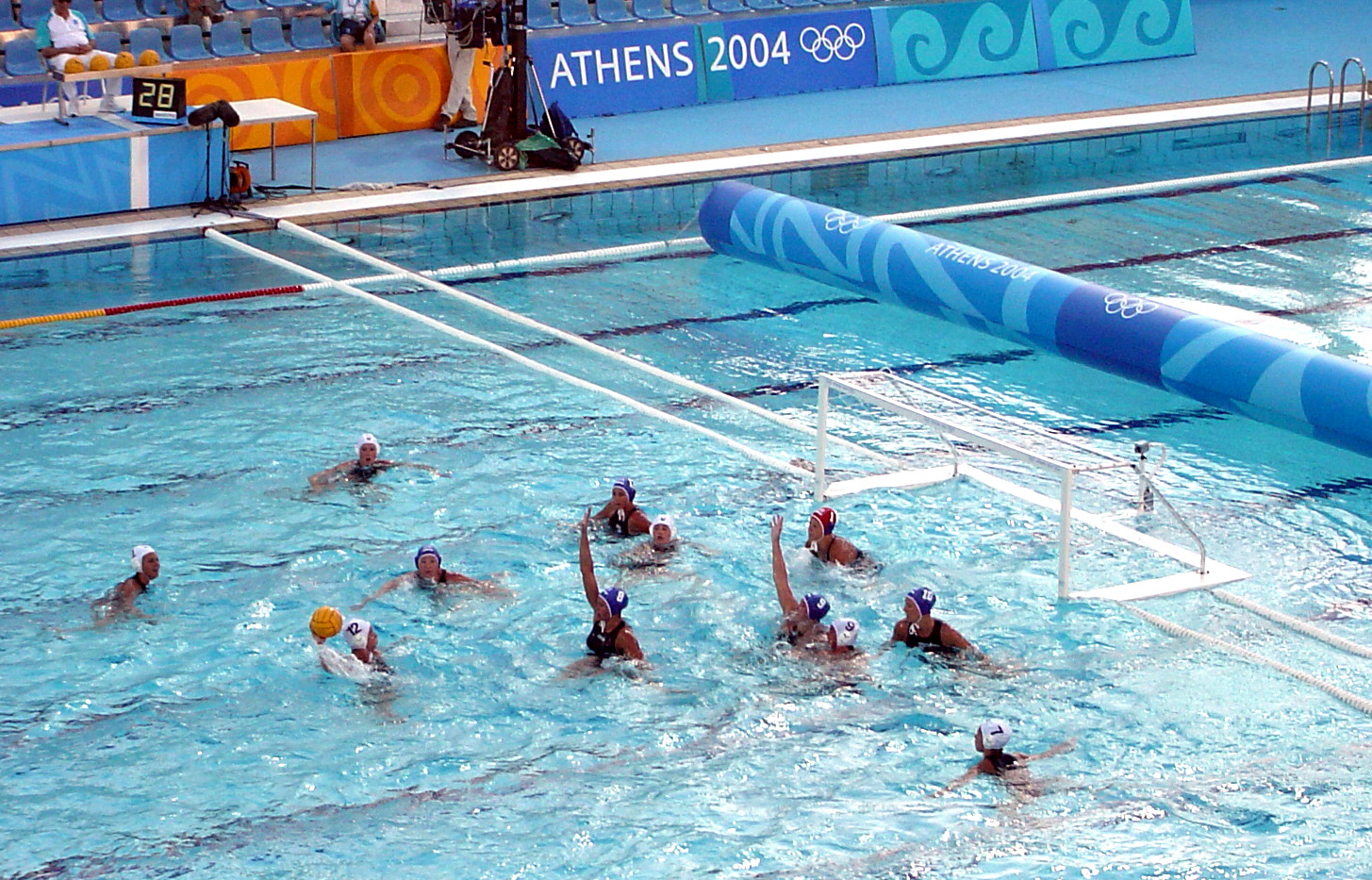
Game at the 2004 Athens Olympics.

Men's water polo at the Olympics was among the first team sports introduced at the 1900 games in Paris (along with cricket, rugby, football (soccer), polo (with horses), rowing and tug of war). Women's water polo became an Olympic sport at the 2000 Sydney Olympic Games after political protests from the Australian women's team. Such protests were rewarded when Australia won the gold medal match against the United States with a "buzzer-beater" last-minute goal, taken from outside the seven-meter line.

Some of the best ever include Spain's Manuel Estiarte who played in a record six Olympics and led in scoring for four of them. Dezső Gyarmati of Hungary won water polo medals at five successive Olympic Games (gold 1952, 1956, 1964; silver 1948; bronze 1960), a record in water polo. Another major figure in the sport was Tamás Faragó, who led Hungary to Olympic Medals in 1972, 1976 and 1980. The play of American Terry Schroeder led the United States to its first Olympic silver medals in 1984 and 1988.

The most famous water polo match in history is probably the 1956 Summer Olympics semi-final match between Hungary and the Soviet Union. As the athletes left for the games, the Hungarian revolution began, and the Soviet army crushed the uprising. Many of the Hungarian athletes vowed never to return home, and felt their only means of fighting back was by victory in the pool. The confrontation was the most bloody and violent water polo game in history, in which the pool reputedly turned red from blood. The Hungarians defeated the Soviets 4–0 before the game was called off in the final minute to prevent angry Hungarians in the crowd reacting to Valentin Prokopov punching Ervin Zádor's eye open. The Hungarians went on to win the Olympic gold medal by defeating Yugoslavia 2–1 in the final. Half of the Hungarian Olympic delegation defected after the games. A documentary by Lucy Liu, Freedom's Fury, premiered in April 2006, recounting the events of the 1956 Hungarian uprising and climaxing with this politicized game.

Serbia won the last four Olympic tournaments.

== International play ==
Every 2 to 4 years since 1973, a men's Water Polo World Championship is played together with the World Swimming Championship, under the auspices of FINA. Women's water polo was added in 1986. A second tournament series, the FINA Water Polo World Cup, has been held every other year since 1979. In 2002, FINA organized the sport's first international league, the FINA Water Polo World League, in which the best national teams compete against one another in an annual season format with nearly half a million dollar purse.

Internationally, the biggest water polo competition in the world is played in the Netherlands. Prince William of Wales was the captain of his collegiate water polo team at St Andrew's University, Scotland. The annual Varsity Match between Oxford and Cambridge Universities is the sport's longest running rivalry, first played in 1891.

== Results of the major international competitions ==
=== Olympic Games ===
Hungary has been the most successful country in men's tournament, while the United States is the only team to win multiple times at the women's tournament since its introduction.

Serbia won the last three Olympic tournaments.

=== World Aquatics Championships ===
Italy and the United States are the most successful countries in men's and women's tournaments, respectively.

=== FINA Water Polo World Cup ===
Hungary and the Netherlands are the most successful countries in men's and women's tournaments, respectively.

=== FINA Water Polo World League ===
Serbia and the United States are the most successful countries in men's and women's tournaments, respectively.

== US colleges and clubs ==
Peter J. Cutino Award

Today club water polo is gaining popularity in the United States. Though the majority of domestic club teams are based in California, Florida, Illinois, and Texas, New England and Missouri preparatory high schools also often field teams. Club water polo teams in the United States often compete in national championships such as Junior Olympics, National Club Championships, and the Speedo Cup. Club teams from Washington, Oregon, Utah, and Michigan were entered at the 2005 USWP Junior Olympics.

Aniko Pelle (Hungary) and Sofia Konoukh (Russia) were among the first of an increasing number of international players competing in U.S. collegiate women's water polo. Because of water polo's increased popularity globally, the influence of international coaches like USC's Jovan Vavic from the former Yugoslavia, and the perks of attending an American college, international players are attracted to the premier US colleges. The 2005 Hawaii women's water polo team, coached by Canadian Michel Roy, has nine international players, the most of any team in the nation.

Teams from California dominate at the collegiate level. In the United States, water polo players tend to have prestigious academic backgrounds as well. A number of players, including former USA team captain Wolf Wigo, who retired after Athens 2004, Jacqueline Frank DeLuca, bronze medal Olympic goalie, and international phenom Tony Azevedo attended Stanford University. The sport's most notable balancing act to date includes Omar Amr, who played on the US National Team while attending Harvard Medical School and recovering from a near career ending knee injury in 2001.

College championships

In the 2008 NCAA Women's Water Polo Championship, the UCLA women beat University of Southern California 6 to 3, for their fourth consecutive championship title. In the 2007 Men's NCAA Finals, the UC Berkeley Golden Bears defended their 2006 title by defeating the No. 1-ranked USC water polo men, 8–6. The most prestigious individual water polo honor, the Peter J. Cutino Award, was established in 1999 by the San Francisco Olympic Club, and is presented annually to the top American male and female collegiate water polo player. In 2008, Tim Hutten from UC Irvine and Courtney Mathewson from UCLA won the Cutinos.

== See also ==
- Dimitrios Diathessopoulos, the father of Greek water polo.
- Geography of water polo
- Glossary of Water Polo
- Rules of water polo

== General sources ==
- Giannouris, Yiannis (February 2020). "1870–2020 | 150 years of Water Polo – Evolution of its rules" (PDF). fina.org. FINA. Archived from the original (PDF) on 17 April 2021.
