= Rules of water polo =

Rules and regulations covering the play, procedure, and equipment of water polo

The rules of water polo are the rules and regulations which cover the play, procedure, equipment and officiating of water polo. These rules are similar throughout the world, although slight variations do occur regionally and depending on the governing body. Governing bodies of water polo include World Aquatics, the international governing organization for the rules; the NCAA, which govern the rules for collegiate matches in the United States; the NFHS, which govern the rules in high schools in the USA; and the IOC, which govern the rules at Olympic events.

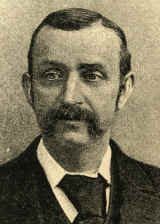
William Wilson, Scottish aquatics pioneer and originator of the first rules of water polo .

== Core rules ==
Note: Rules below reflect the latest FINA Water Polo Rules. The sport of Water Polo, as its name suggests, is played in a pool of water that resembles a soccer or hockey court, having 2 goal posts at each end of the pool.

=== Number of players ===
Senior games consist of seven players from each team (six field players and a goalkeeper) that are allowed in the playing area of the pool during gameplay. FINA reduced the number of players in U20 (and younger) competitions that they sanction to six (5 field players and a goalkeeper) in 2014. If a player commits an exclusion (major) foul, then that team will play with one player fewer until the player is allowed to re-enter (typically 18 seconds). If a player commits a particularly violent act, such as striking a player, then the referee may signal a brutality foul, in which case that team is required to play with one fewer player in the water for 4 minutes, and the excluded player is ejected and must leave the pool area and cannot return. The excluded player may not be allowed to compete in a given number of future games depending on the governing body.

Players may be substituted in and out after goals, during timeouts, between quarters, and after injuries. During game play, players enter and exit in the corner of the pool (called the re-entry area), or in front of their goal. When play is stopped, they may enter or exit anywhere.

If at any time during play a team has more players in the pool than they are allowed, a penalty is given to the opposing team. If a team starts with less than six outfield players, the referee may yellow card the coach for allowing it to happen and give a major foul to the opposition on 6 metres, if the 6th player then joins the game illegally.

A variation is beach water polo, which has four players including the goal keeper, and a smaller field, and some other differing rules.

=== Caps ===
The two opposing teams must wear caps which contrast:

- with both (or either) goalkeeper cap color,
- with the other team's cap color and
- with the ball color.

In practice, one team usually wears dark caps and the other white (usually white for the home team, and dark for the away team for FINA). Teams may choose to wear different cap colors (e.g. their team colors). For instance, Australia's women's water polo team wears green caps. For NFHS, CWPA, and NCAA rules (United States) the home team is dark and the away team is white.

The water polo cap is used to protect the players' heads and ears, and the numbers on them (1-13) make them identifiable from afar, especially by the referee(s). Both goalies wear red or red striped caps. The first choice goalkeeper is usually marked "1" with the reserve being marked "13" (under FINA rules) or "1A" (under NCAA and NFHS rules).

=== Duration of the game ===
The game is divided into four periods; the length depends on the level of play. There is no overtime nor ties in international water polo, and games proceed to a shootout if a victor is required. At the collegiate level there are two straight 3-minute periods; and if still tied, multiple 3-minute golden goal overtime periods thereafter. Lower levels of play have different overtime rules depending on the organization.

A two-minute break follows every period (including overtime/shootout), but there's also a 5-minute halftime intermission.

Level of play	Team level	Time each period	Authority	Notes
Olympics	National	8 minutes	FINA	
FINA Water Polo World League	National	8 minutes	FINA	
European Leagues	Club	8 minutes	LEN	
Senior club play	Club	9 minutes	FINA	
US College	Varsity	8 minutes	CWPA	
US College	Club	7 minutes	CWPA	
US High School	Varsity	7 minutes	NFHS	
US High School	Junior Varsity	6 minutes	NFHS	
US High School	Freshman/Sophomore	5–6 minutes	NFHS	
USA Water Polo	14 and unders	5–7 minutes	USAWPR	

=== Game and shot clock ===
The game clock is stopped when the ball is not in play (between a foul being committed and the free throw being taken, and between a goal being scored and the restart). As a result, the average quarter lasts around 12 minutes of real time. Since 2025, especially for the upcoming 2028 Summer Olympics, a team may not have possession of the ball for longer than 28 seconds without shooting for the goal unless an opponent commits an ejection foul. After 28 seconds, possession passes to the other team, and the shot-clock is reset. The clock is also reset for 28 seconds after a goal or neutral throw, or penalty in which possession is exchanged. Like basketball, the final five seconds is measured in tenths.

However, if a team shoots the ball within the allotted time, and regains control of the ball (e.g. after a rebound from the goal post), the shot clock is reset to 18 seconds. It is also reset for 18 seconds after a major (exclusion) foul, corner throw, or rebound from a penalty throw if the attacking team retain possession.

=== Pool dimensions ===
The layout of a water polo pool showing the 2m and 5m markings (red and yellow), the half-way line (marked in white), a goal at either end and the length and width of the pool.

Dimensions of the water polo pool aren't fixed and can vary between 20×10 and 25×20 meters (World Aquatics approved matches require a 25x20 meter pool for both genders), therefore short course pools can be used. Minimum water depth must be least 1.8 meters (6 feet), but this is often not the case due to nature of the pool (as many have shallow ends). The goals are 3 m (9 ft 10.11 in) wide & 0.9 m (2 ft 11.43 in) high.

The middle of the pool is designated by a white line. Before 2005, the pool was divided by 7 and 4 meter lines (distance out from the goal line). This has been merged into one 5 meter line since the 2005–2006 season, and '6 meter' line since the 2019–2020 season. The 6 meter line is marked by a yellow line. It was brought in by FINA in 2019, and relates to the method of taking a free throw after an ordinary or exclusion foul. The '5 meter' line is where penalties are shot and it is designated by a yellow line. The '2 meter' line is designated with a red line; and no player of the attacking team can receive a ball inside this zone. Those are being used since the 2020 Summer Olympics in 2021. Since 2022 this rule has been updated to allow for players of the attacking team to be within the '2 meter' line, so long as they are at least 2 meters away laterally from the outside of the nearest goal post.

Water polo balls are generally yellow and of varying size and weight for juniors, women and men.

In a game, if the ball goes out of the playing area (or hits the edge of the pool then falls back in to the water), a free throw is given to the team that did not touch the ball last before it went out of play. Shots that go out over the goal line are given 'goal throws', even if blocked by defenders before going out. If touched by the goalie, a 'corner throw' is given to the attacking team instead.

Also, the referee should not pick up the ball when it is at the side of the pool during a break in play, and hand it to the attacking team - as this can lead to an advantage to that team.

== Gameplay ==
=== Beginning of play ===
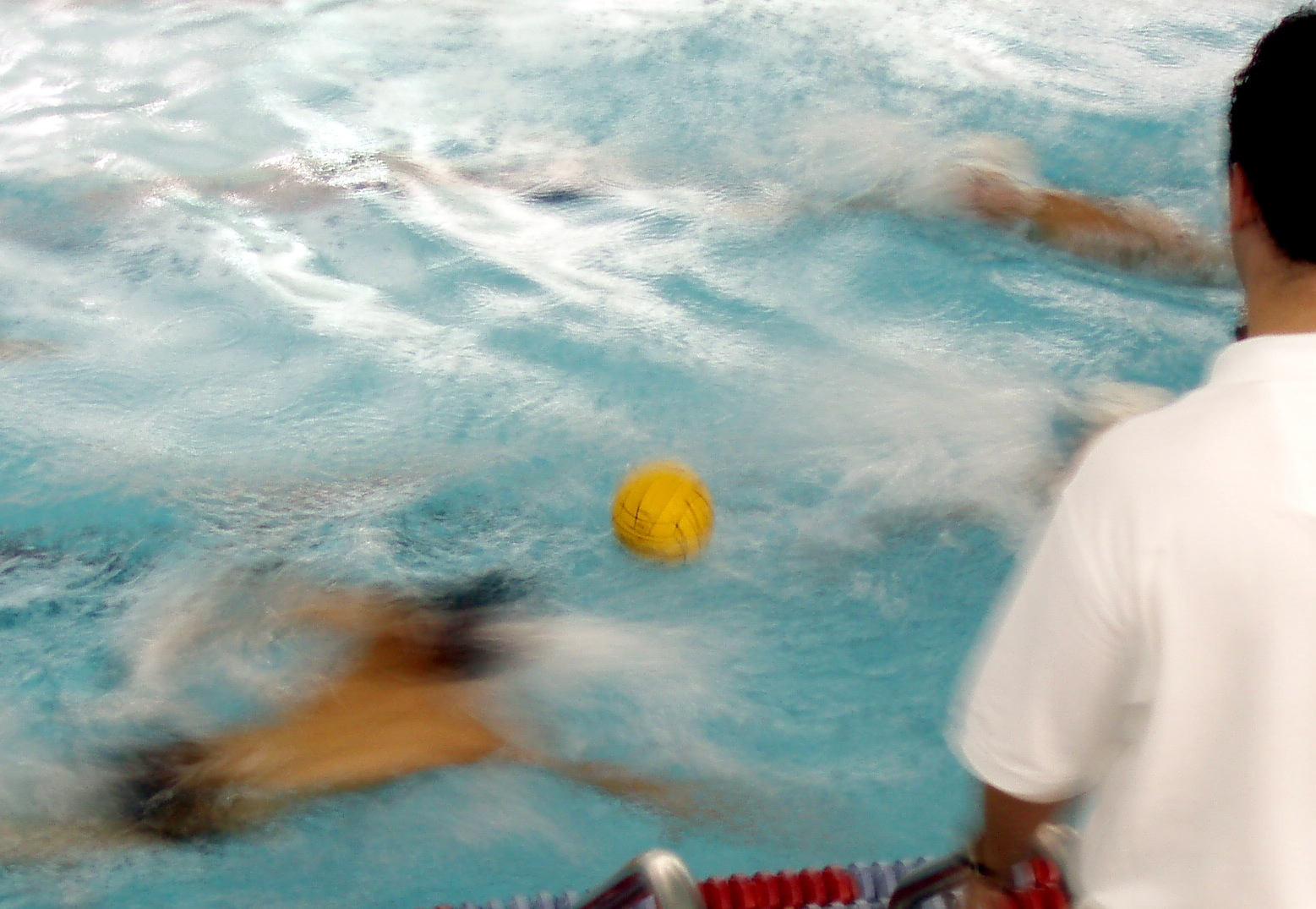
The sprint (swim-off).

In an all-deep water pool, the home team starts on the left side (looking across the pool from the scoring table). The teams change ends at halftime. In a pool with a shallow end, there is a toss of a coin to decide which team starts on which side. The teams change ends at the end of two quarters.

At the start of each period and after every score, teams line up on their own goal line. The most common formation is for three players to go to each side of the goal, while the goalkeeper stays in the goal. If the ball is to be thrown into the pool's center, the sprinter will often start in the goal, while the goalkeeper begins either in the goal as well, or to one side of the goal.

At the referee's whistle, both teams swim to midpoint of the field (known as the 'sprint' or the 'swim-off') as the referee drops the ball on to the water. Depending on the rules being played, this is either on the referee's side of the pool or in the center. In international competitions the ball is normally placed in the middle of the pool and is supported with a floating ring. The first team to recover the ball becomes the attacker until a goal is scored or the defenders recover the ball.

Exceptionally, a foul may be given before either team reaches the ball. This usually occurs when a player uses the side to assist themselves gain a speed advantage (i.e. by pulling on the side to move faster). The non-offending team receives a free throw from the halfway line in such scenarios.

The swim-off occurs only at the start of periods & after scores. There are 4 swim-offs in a game, as the game is divided into 4 quarters of 8-minutes each.

The referee(s) should check the players' nails before the start of play (to prevent scratching). Goggles and jewelry are not normally allowed.

=== Scoring ===
A goal is scored if the ball completely passes between the goal posts and is underneath the crossbar. If a shot bounces off a goal post back into the field of play, and the ball is regained by the attacking team, the shot clock is reset (to 18 seconds), and play continues. If the shot goes outside the goal and touches the rope, or onto the deck (outside the field of play), a goal throw (to the defence) occurs, and the clock is reset (to 28 seconds). This has to be taken without delay (time limit not specified in rules). If the goalie, however, is the last to touch the ball before it goes out of play behind the goal line, or if a defender purposely sends the ball out, then the offense receives the ball for a 'corner throw' on the two meter line. From a corner, which also has to be taken without delay (again time limit not specified in the rules), the player can swim with the ball, shoot at goal or pass. Goals are also scored if shots are taken before shot clock hits 0 and/or game clock hits 00.0, provided the ball is free from the player's hands.

When the goalie blocks a shot, the defense may gain control of the ball, and make a long pass to a teammate who stayed on his offensive end of the pool when the rest of his team was defending. An own goal can occur (rarely) and then the goal is awarded to the attacking player that last touched the ball.

=== Restart after a goal ===
After a goal is scored, the teams may line up anywhere within their own half of the pool. This is usually near the center of the pool. Play resumes when the referee signals for play to restart and the team not scoring the goal puts the ball in to play by passing it backwards to a teammate.

=== Timeouts ===
Each team may call a variable (according to the rules being used) number of one 1-minute timeouts (USA/FINA) or 2-minute timeouts (NCAA/NFHS); and one timeout if the game goes into overtime/shootout. During game play, only the team in possession of the ball may call a timeout. Timeouts don't carry over to overtime/shootout. The penalty for calling a timeout during play without possession of the ball is a penalty foul going against the team.

FINA Water polo rules allow for two timeouts for each team in a match. They can be taken in the same period.

NCAA and NFHS rules allow for three timeouts during regulation play. If the game goes into overtime, each team is allowed one timeout for the duration of overtime.

Three short whistles are blown by the referee at 45 seconds (after a prompt from the scorers on the scoring table) during the timeout, and he/she waves the attacking players forward into the opponents’ half. At 60 seconds, the ball is thrown to the goalkeeper (usually) on the halfway line, who can play the ball when another (single) long whistle is blown.

=== Substitutions ===
A substitute can enter the pool from any place during the intervals between quarters, after a goal has been scored, during a timeout and to replace an injured player; but not after a penalty. If a substitution is made during play, the head of the player leaving should be visible in the re-entry area, before the player entering the pool can go under the rope. Neither can lift the rope.

=== Control over conduct ===
Water polo referees utilize red and yellow cards when handling bench conduct. A verbal warning may be issued depending on the severity of the infraction.

A yellow card may be issued at any point in the game and can be issued via a "walking yellow" in which the referee pulls a yellow card out without stopping live play. Following the issuance of a "walking yellow", at the next stoppage of play, the referee may pull the ball out to inform the table and partner referee of the issuance of that card.

A red card can be issued to any team personnel (head and assistant coaches, team managers, players, and other officials with the team) or supporters. Following the issuance of a red card, the individual must leave the pool area, and have no further contact with the game (by any method). Red cards carry at least a one-game suspension for the offender with a report being filed to the appropriate governing authority. A red card is also given to players acquiring their second yellow card.

=== Fouls ===
==== Ordinary fouls ====
Ordinary fouls occur when a player impedes or otherwise prevents the free movement of an opponent who is not holding the ball, but has it in or near their possession. The most common is when a player reaches over the shoulder of an opponent in order to knock the ball away while in the process hindering the opponent. Offensive players may be called for a foul by pushing off a defender to provide space for a pass or shot.

The referee indicates the foul with one short whistle blow and points one hand in the direction of the attacking team (standing roughly in line with the position of the foul), who retain possession. The attacker must make a free pass without undue delay (time period not specified in the rules) to another offensive player. If the foul has been committed outside the 6 meter line, the offensive player can attempt a direct shot on goal, but the shot must be taken immediately and in one continuous motion (i.e., with no faking). If the offensive player fakes a shot and then shoots the ball, it is a turnover.

The defender (usually the one that has conceded the foul) has to back off (a distance not specified in the rules, but usually taken to be 1.5–2 meters) to allow the free throw to be taken. In other words, they cannot simply hold their ground to block the offensive player. The defender, at a reasonable distance, can raise one arm to compete at the free throw. The throw (and all throws after infringements) has to be taken without delay. The maximum time period for this (also not stated in the rules) is usually taken to be about 3 seconds.

If the same defender repeatedly makes minor fouls, referees will exclude that player for 28 seconds. To avoid an ejection, the "hole" (centre) defender may foul twice, and then have a wing defender switch with him so that the defense can continue to foul the "hole man" (centre forward) without provoking an exclusion foul. The rule was altered to allow repeated fouls without exclusions, but is often still enforced by referees.

There are quite a few other infringements that lead to an ordinary foul, including standing if there is a shallow end, delaying taking a throw (free, goal or corner), taking a penalty throw incorrectly, touching the ball with two hands (if not the goalkeeper), simulating being fouled, time-wasting, and being within two metres of the goal.

==== Major fouls ====
Major fouls (exclusion and penalty fouls) are committed when the defensive player "holds (especially with two hands), sinks or pulls back" (a key phrase in water polo) the offensive player. This includes swimming on the other player's legs or back, stopping the other player from swimming, or otherwise preventing the offensive player from preserving his advantage.

A referee signals a major foul by two short whistle bursts, then a long burst, and indicates that the player must leave the field of play and move to the penalty area for 18 seconds. The referee will first point to the player who commits the foul and will blow the whistle, then they will point to the ejection corner and blow the whistle again. The player must move to their re-entry area without impacting the natural game play and in reasonable time (or a penalty is given). A player that has been ejected thrice must sit out the rest of the match.

There are several other infringements that can lead to an exclusion foul:

- Sitting on the steps or side of pool;
- Splashing an opponent in the face;
- Interfering with a free, goal or corner throw; this includes the defender failing to release the ball, or throwing or moving it away; or attempting to play the ball before it has left the hand of the thrower;
- Blocking a pass or shot with two hands inside 6 metres; if the referee thinks that this action would have prevented a goal, a penalty can be awarded;
- After the change of possession, for a defending player to commit any foul anywhere in the attacking team's half of the pool; this is to prevent a foul before the attacker (or ball) has passed the halfway line;
- Kicking or striking an opponent (or showing an intent to); if this occurs within 6 metres, a penalty throw is also awarded. The referee can decide to punish a kick or strike in this way, or with a Misconduct or Brutality foul (see later) depending on intent, and effect;
- For an excluded player to interfere with play, or not leave immediately. Another exclusion (personal) foul is recorded on that player, and a penalty is awarded;
- For an excluded player to re-enter (or substitute to enter) improperly; e.g., without a signal from the referee (or scoring table), or not from the re-entry area, or by affecting the alignment of the goal (e.g. by lifting the rope). They are excluded (again) but only one personal foul is recorded and a penalty is awarded (if the player's team is not in possession of the ball);
- For the defending goalkeeper to fail to take up the correct position at the taking of a penalty throw, having been ordered once to do so by the referee.

A brutality foul is called when a player kicks or strikes an opponent or official with malicious intent. The strike must make contact with the player for a brutality to be called, and must be with intent to injure. Otherwise the player is punished with a misconduct foul, with substitution allowed after 18 seconds or a change of possession. The player who is charged with a brutality is red-carded; that team plays shorthanded for 4 minutes, and is forced to play with one fewer player than the other team for that duration. In addition to the exclusion, a penalty shot is also awarded to the opposing team if the foul occurs during actual play. Previously, the team who was charged with a brutality would be required to play the remainder of the game with one fewer player. All brutalities have to be reported by officials and further actions may be taken by the relevant governing body. These actions could include more games added onto the one-game suspension.

A flagrant misconduct foul is the NFHS/ NCAA wording of FINA's brutality. Following the issuance of a flagrant misconduct foul the player is given a red card. The penalty for a flagrant misconduct is a penalty shot followed by a 6–on-5, regardless of the team scoring off the penalty throw. Like a brutality foul, officials must report to their relevant governing body.

A misconduct foul is an unsportsmanlike act; these include unacceptable language, violence or persistent fouls, taking part in the game after being excluded, or showing disrespect. The player is red-carded with substitution after 18 seconds has elapsed. There are two kinds of misconduct fouls that a player can incur. If the incident does not involve physical (or attempted) contact, the referee can impose a Misconduct charge.

=== Five meter penalty ===
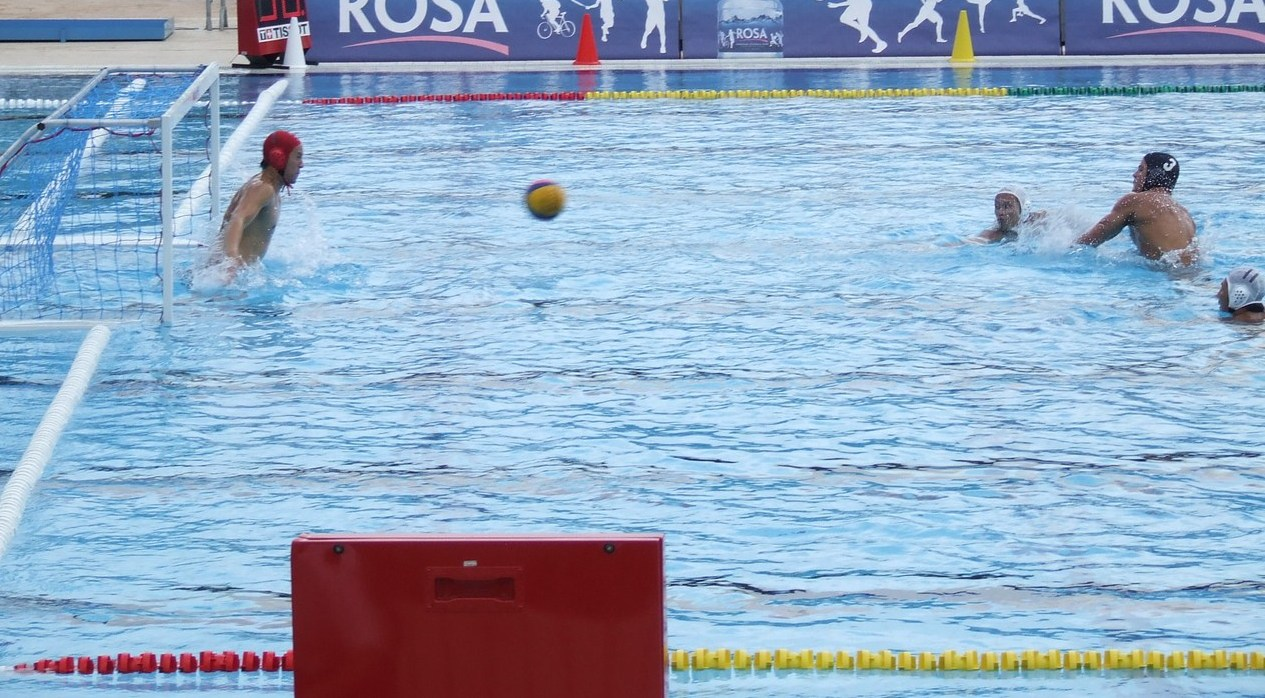
Five meter penalty shooting

If a defender commits a major foul within the six meter area that prevents a likely goal, the attacking team is awarded a penalty throw or shot. This is usually when the attacking player is impeded in taking a shot at goal, from behind or the side. According to the FINA rule changes in 2019, the referee no longer has any discretion in awarding a penalty (e.g., taking into account whether a goal was likely or not).

An attacking player lines up on the five meter line in front of the opposing goal. No other player may be in front of him or within 2 meters of his position. The defending goalkeeper must be between the goal posts. The referee signals with a whistle and by lowering his arm, and the player taking the penalty shot must immediately throw the ball with an uninterrupted motion toward the goal (i.e., without pumping or faking). The shooter's body can not at any time cross the 5 meter line until after the ball is released. If the shooter carries his body over the line and shoots the result is a turn over. If the shot does not score and the ball stays in play then play continues. Penalty shots are often successful, with 63.7% of shots being scored from them.

There are quite a few other infringements that can lead to a penalty: a player that has been excluded interfering with the game as they exit the pool, an excluded player entering the pool without a signal from the referee (or scoring table), a player or substitute exiting or entering the pool incorrectly (during game time, e.g., lifting the rope), a brutality foul, a coach or captain requesting a time out when not in possession of the ball, and a coach delaying the return of the ball.

=== Overtime ===
==== FINA ====
If the score is tied at the end of regulation play, a penalty shootout will determine the winner. Five players and a goalkeeper are chosen by the coaches of each team. A player cannot be chosen if s/he is ineligible to play from receiving (i.e. 3 personal fouls or red carded). Players shoot from the 5 meter line alternately at either end of the pool in turn until all five have taken a shot. If the score is still tied, the same players shoot alternately until one team misses and the other scores.

==== NCAA ====
Differing from FINA rules which require shootouts, NCAA rules require teams to play two three-minute overtime periods, and if still tied play additional three-minute sudden death periods until a team scores a goal and wins the game.

==== NFHS ====
American high school water polo plays overtime as two 3 minute periods followed by multiple 3-minute sudden death periods if the tie persists after the 2 periods of play.

Tournament hosts can modify their rules to incorporate regulation, such as sudden death immediately following 4 periods of the game, or a shoot-out.

== Officials ==
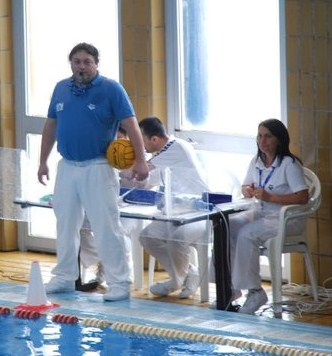
A water polo referee standing in front of the table officials.

The game of water polo requires numerous officials. The four main categories are: referee, secretary, timekeeper and goal judge. These can again be qualified into two broader categories: game officials and table officials.

=== Game officials ===
Because water polo is a fast, high scoring game, several officials are required: (ideally) two referees, a secretary, two game/shot clock operator(s), and two goal judges. For many lower level games one referee and two people on the scoring table is sufficient. Game officials are broadly responsible for ensuring the game runs smoothly and that correct and fair decisions relating to the game are made.

==== Referee ====
The referees have ultimate power over decisions relating to the game, even (if necessary) overruling decisions from goal judges, secretaries or timekeepers. They have the responsibility of signalling fouls (ordinary, exclusion, misconduct and brutality), goals, penalties, timeouts, start of play, end of play (to an extent), restart of play, neutral, corner and goal throws. The referee must attempt to keep to all of the rules of water polo to the governing body they are using.

There are always one or two referees in a game of water polo. At a higher level, two referees are virtually always used; but at lower levels, if there are limited available referees, a referee may officiate the game without another. When goal judges are not present or available, the referee(s) may take their place in that they have the decision as to whether the ball has crossed the line etc.

Referees have a variety of methods for signalling fouls, most of which are done by hand and with the aid of a whistle. The purpose of these signals are to inform players, coaches, spectators and other officials of the decision being made, with sometimes information as to why the decision has been awarded. They have the power to remove anyone from the pool area (for Misconduct), including coaches and spectators.

Referees have dress codes at higher (and sometimes lower) levels of water polo, and are expected to abide by this. Often, the dress code is all white, but some associations deviate this slightly.

==== Goal judge ====
Depending on the availability of officials goal judges may or may not be used. Goal judges are often seen at high level competition.

The goal judges are responsible for several parts of the game. These include: signalling when a goal is scored, signalling corner throws, improper re-entry (after an exclusion), to signal when play can start (at the beginning of quarters) and to signal improper restart at the beginning of quarters.

The goal judge is situated (normally sat) perfectly in line with the goal line - one at either end and usually on opposite sides. They remain seated throughout the game.

=== Table officials ===
The table officials in water polo are the timekeeper(s) and the secretary/secretaries. They are overall responsible for the timings of the game and keeping correct information regarding the events of the game, as well as informing of the players of very specific information (notably to do with personal fouls).

==== Timekeeper ====
The timekeeper (or timekeepers) have varying responsibilities depending on the equipment available. Only one is required if no 30 second clock is being used, with two being required otherwise (shot clocks are supposed to be used, but sometimes due to unavailability games are played without them). In higher level matches sometimes there are more than two timekeepers used.

Often (though not always) one timekeeper is responsible for running the shot clock. This means that they reset the shot clock when necessary. When this is the case, the other timekeeper is often responsible for the game clock and score. If an electronic scoreboard and game clock is being used, the timekeeper will update the score when necessary, and has a similar job with the game clock. If not, then the timekeeper will manually time the periods with a stopwatch (or similar device) and alert the players when the period is over with a whistle. If an electronic scoreboard is used, a synthetically produced sound is often produced at the end of periods to alert other officials and players of the end of the period.

Timekeepers are essentially responsible for keeping record of: the current score (though this is done more officially by the secretary), the 30 second clock, the length of the quarters (at the end of each quarter they indicate this with a whistle blow if this is not done synthetically), the time of exclusion (and when re-entry is thus allowed), the length of timeouts, the length of time between periods and to signal (if not done synthetically) by whistle 30 seconds before the end of quarter or half time and 15 seconds before the end of a timeout. Timekeepers are also responsible for the last minute bell: a bell (or other device - can be audible) showing one minute remaining before full-time.

==== Secretary ====
The secretary (or secretaries) are responsible for keeping written accounts of notable events in the match, and at what point in the match they occur. Where necessary, the player (or players) involved in an event have their hat number and colour noted next to the event including:

- Goals scored
- Exclusion and penalty fouls
- Timeouts called

The secretary is also responsible for keeping a record of how many personal fouls each player has. If a player receives three personal fouls, the secretary is required to hold up the red flag as indication of the player's banishment from the remainder of the match. Should the third personal foul be a penalty foul, then the red flag should be raised and a whistle sounded by the secretary simultaneously.

== See also ==
- History of water polo

== Sources ==
- Giannouris, Yiannis (February 2020). "1870–2020 | 150 years of Water Polo – Evolution of its rules" (PDF). fina.org. FINA.
