= Goalkeeper (water polo) =

Position in water polo

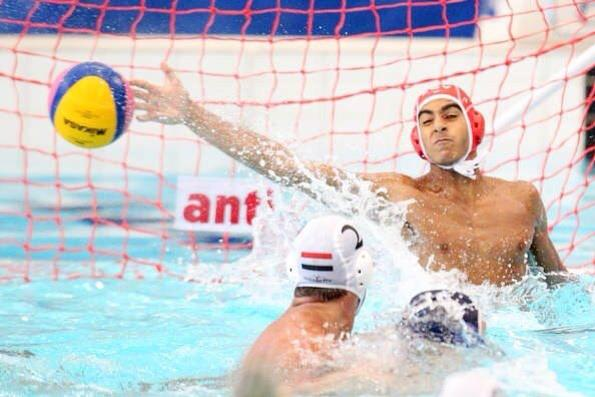
Egyptian Goalkeeper blocking a shot with his outstretched arm

In water polo, the goalkeeper occupies a position as the last line of defense between the opponent's offence and their own team's goal, which is 2.8 m^{2} (30 sq ft). (Note: The height of the goal is normally 90 cm (35 in) and the width is 3 m (9.8 ft). However, in pools with a depth of less than 1.5 m (4 ft 11 in) the height of the goal is 2.4 m (7 ft 10 in) making them 3.6 m^{2} (39 sq ft) in shallow water.)

The goalkeeper position is unique; they possess certain privileges and are subject to different restrictions than those of field players. Accordingly, they possess different skills than those of the field players.

Goalkeepers often have longer playing careers than field players because they need mental power rather than physical power.

In water polo, the goalkeeper is commonly known as the goalie or keeper and may also be known as the man/woman in the cage.

== History ==
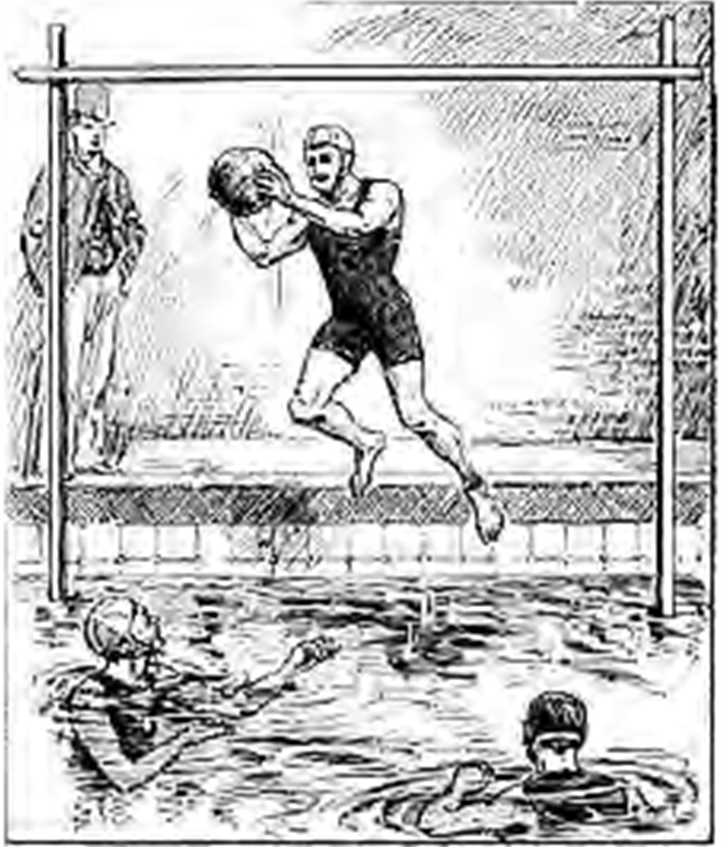
A water polo goalkeeper defending the goal between rugby posts as would have happened not long after the origin of the game.

The position of the goalkeeper has existed since the game of water polo originated. At that time, the object of the game was to touch the ball on the opponent's end of the pool. The goalkeeper would wait at the end of the pool until an opposing player approached the goal, when the goalkeeper would try to stop that player, for example, by dunking their head.

A change occurred in the game and the role of the goalkeeper in the 1880s, when the Scottish reduced the size of the scoring area by placing rugby posts, spaced about 10 feet apart, at each end of the pool. At the same time, the rules were changed to allow goalkeepers to stand on the pool deck and leap onto the head of an opposing player who approached the goal. This change in the rules was brief. To prevent the serious injuries that resulted from this method of goalkeeping, the rules were revised again to require the goalie to remain in the water.

The basic functions of the goalie position have changed little over the last century, but there have been changes affecting the style of play. In the 1940s, Hungary introduced a new technique called the eggbeater kick that enables goalkeepers to maintain a stable balance in the water.

== Rules ==
Fina Rules 2019/2021

Inside the 6 m (20 ft) area, the goalkeeper is the only person on the team permitted to touch the ball with two hands, touch the bottom of the pool (Note: This is only in shallow pools; most pools are at least 1.8–2 m deep) and punch the ball with a clenched fist. The goalkeeper may advance beyond the half-way line, they may attempt shots at the other goal.

Any goalkeeper who makes an aggressive foul on an attacker in within the 6 m (20 ft) area of the goalie's team is charged with a penalty shot for the other team. The goalkeeper can also be temporarily ejected from the game for twenty seconds if they make an ordinary foul within the goalie's 6 m (20 ft) area(for example, by splashing). If the goalkeeper then holds the ball under the water when challenged by an opponent; it is awarded a penalty to the opponent team. Importantly, if the goalkeeper forces the ball under while an opponent has possession, a turnover will be called and the goalkeeper will gain possession of the ball. A penalty is also awarded to the other team to pull down or otherwise displace the goal at any time during the match.

Goalkeeper's caps are usually numbered 1 or 1B and sometimes 13 and red colored to distinguish their position.

=== Rule variations ===
Below is a table showing the major differences of rules and regulations for water polo goalkeepers between the latest changes made by the FINA.

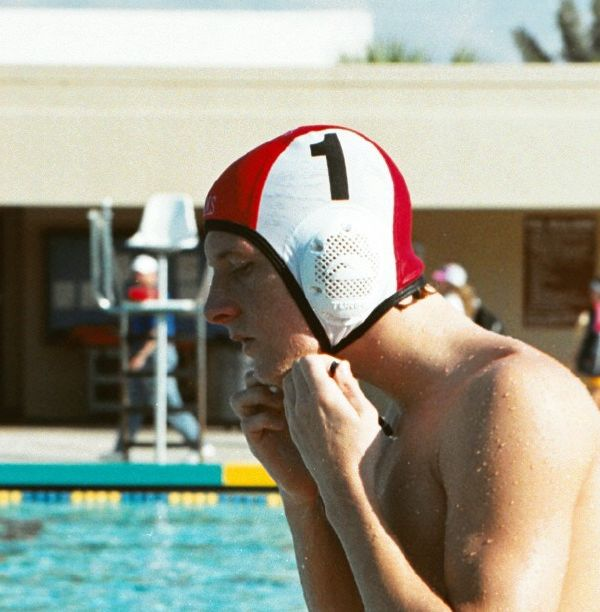
A goalkeeper cap

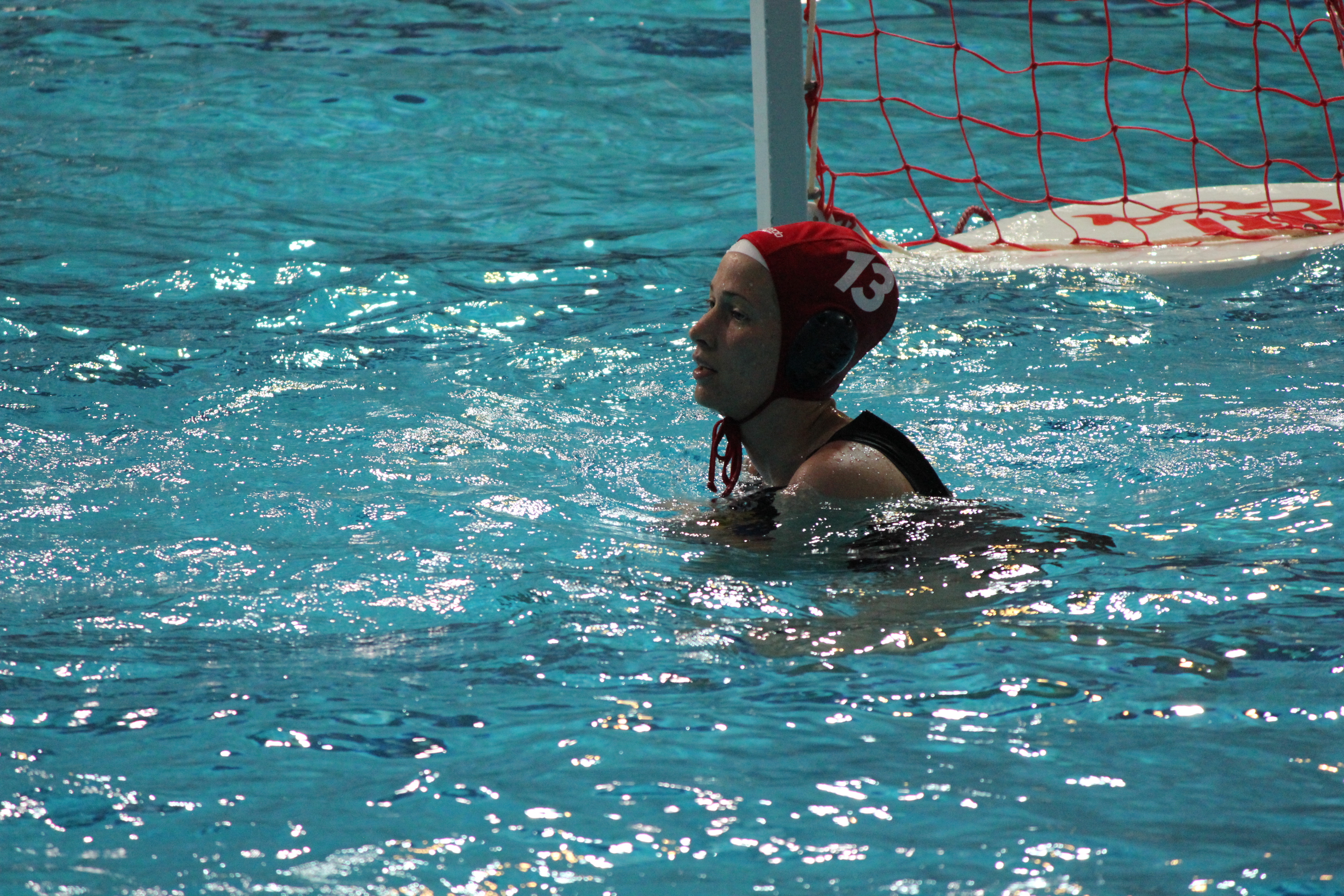
A water polo goalkeeper with a reserve cap on (FINA rules).

	FINA (2019–2021 rules)	NCAA (2010–2012 rules)
Position of Goalkeeper at penalty throw	No part of the goalkeeper may be past the crossbar at the shot.	The goalkeeper's hips must be on the goal line at the penalty throw.
Goalkeeper ear guard colour	Ear guards must be either the same colour as their team's cap colour or red.	Ear guards must match as closely as possible the goalkeeper's team colour. Theirs may be red only if their team's cap colour is red.
Goalkeeper cap colour	Goalkeeper caps must be red.	The goalkeeper's cap must contrast from their team; the home team must contrast white and red and the away team blue and red. It may not be striped.
Goalkeeper cap numbering	Goalkeeper's cap number can be either 1 or 13.	Goalkeeper's cap number can be any number as long as cap is red. etc.
Goalkeeper cap numbering colour	Can be any color as long as it is visible to the referee.	The home goalkeeper's colour is white or yellow and away goalkeeper is dark.
Goalkeeper swim cap colour	Not officially mentioned.	Swim cap colours, if worn at all, must be red or white for visiting goalkeeper and red or dark for home goalkeeper.
Female goalkeeper swimsuit requirements	Players shall wear non-transparent costumes or costumes with a separate undergarment and before taking part in a game shall remove any articles likely to cause injury.	Either a nontransparent, one-piece swimsuit or competitive one-piece suit with straps at least 1 inch in width. These straps are forbidden to be spaghetti straps. There is a rule for exposure.
Goalkeepers retrieving balls that have gone over the side	Not allowed without permission. In the case of this happening, the goalkeeper is excluded for 20 Seconds.	Same as FINA.

== Responsibilities and techniques ==
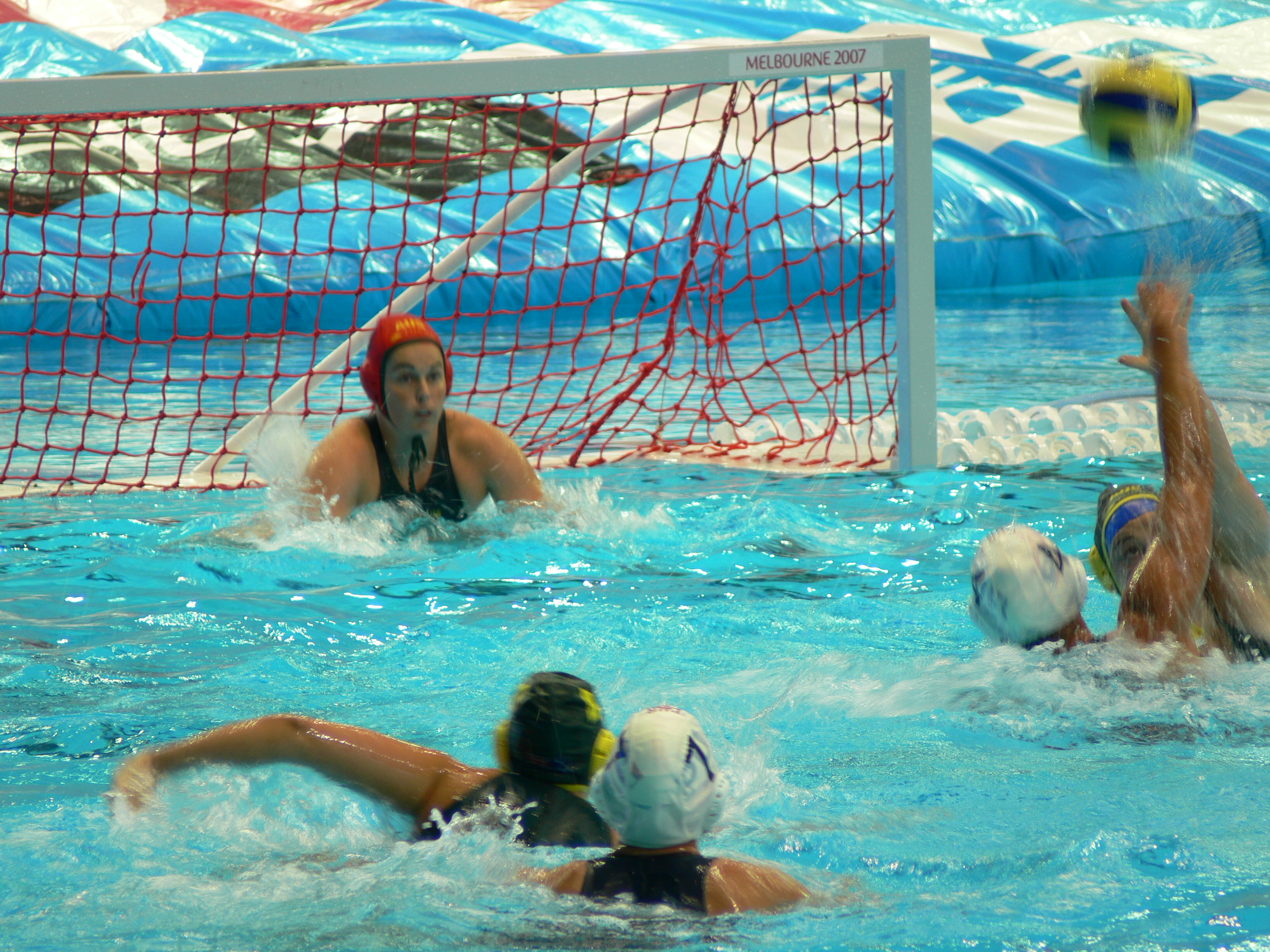
A water polo goalkeeper in the ready position (with her hands near the top of the water)

I use my hands when the ball is being passed from one player to another. When a player has the ball and is ready to shoot I ease up on the arms and hands; the legs take over.

— András Molnár

In water polo, field players possess entirely different skills and responsibilities to the goalkeeper.

=== Responsibilities ===
The primary role of the goalkeeper is to block shots at the goal. After saving the ball, the goalkeeper has the responsibility to keep possession of the ball in order to stop opposing players regaining possession. They must make sure that whenever the opposition appears to be ready to make a shot on goal, their hands are near or above the surface of the water. They also possess the job to pass down the pool accurately to retain possession of the ball, often starting the team's counterattack.

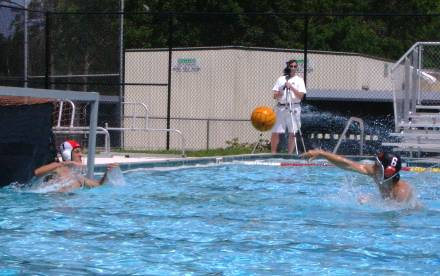
A goalkeeper at a penalty shot using option 2.

The goalkeeper is the only player who may block a penalty and because 63.7% of penalties are goals, the goalkeeper has a massive role in this area but failure to be in the correct position at a penalty is an exclusion foul. At a penalty shootout, the goalkeeper's job is critical and will largely determine the outcome of the match. If the goalkeeper is excluded during the course of the penalty shootout, then one of the other five players in the pool may take their place. The goalkeeper's hips should be high at a penalty shot to give them extra height. The goalkeeper should do one of two things at a penalty shot:

1. Stay in the middle of the goal, raise themself up high and spread arms wide to eliminate the possibility of shots towards the centre of the goal
2. Move to one side of the goal as a guess to where the shooter will place the ball.

Moreover, goalkeepers should have leadership. They should inform field players of information, such as unmarked players and the time of the game clock and give instructions to the field players. Because of this, they may sometimes be known as the coach in the water.

When a man down, goalkeepers have extra responsibility. It is easier for the other team to continue to shoot, making the goalkeeper very worn out. Platanou said that with a man down the goalkeeper had "The highest possible intensity".

=== Body part techniques ===
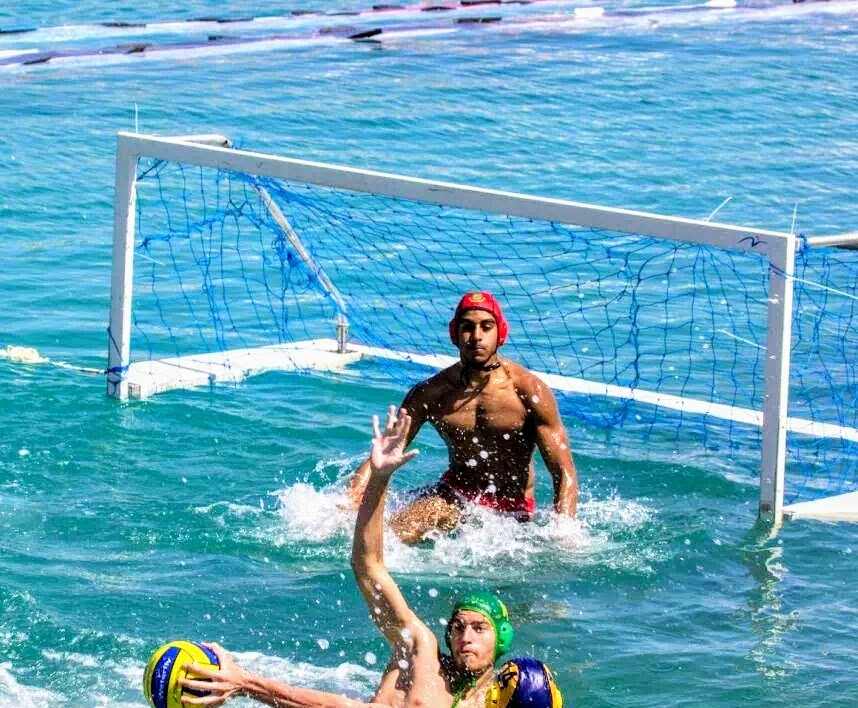
Goalkeeper eggbeaters up to block a shot.

Most of the time, goalkeepers do low-intensity work (treading water without too much effort) but when they do work (for example, when they have a man down or are in the ready position) it is very intense.

Goalkeepers must be able to perform the eggbeater kick to a high standard. Before the eggbeater kick, goalkeepers would use breaststroke which meant that they could not stay up for very long and players found it easier to score. By using the eggbeater kick, goalkeepers can raise their bodies high enough in the water to be able to block shots at the goal for longer periods of time. This can be used conjunctively with sculling, in which the goalkeeper keeps their hands closed (with the fingers together) and moves them forwards and backwards.

The easiest way for the goalkeeper to block shots is for them to block the ball with either their hands or arms. Longer arms can help the goalkeeper to reach the ball, thus being an advantage. Sports involving quick reactions may be helpful, as these help the goalkeeper's reflexes which is a crucial skill.

==== Body part work ====
To improve, there are a variety of drills designed to improve the goalkeeper's skill.

To start with, there are drills to help improve the goalkeeper in the water. These range from simple exercise (such as jumping as high out of the water as possible with two hands) to drills not specifically used in water polo; rather they are used to improve the goalkeeper's core muscles (such as catching a ball dropped from the side into the water).

As the goalkeeper must be able to swim quickly for short distances, to improve they can practice exercises such as swimming quickly and then immediately stopping without touching the sides. It is important for the goalkeeper to swim both breastroke and freestyle – the breastroke helping with the eggbeater kick and the freestyle helping with the swimming in the match.

Moreover, at the start of the game it is vital for the goalkeeper to stretch for 15 minutes.

=== Blocking techniques ===
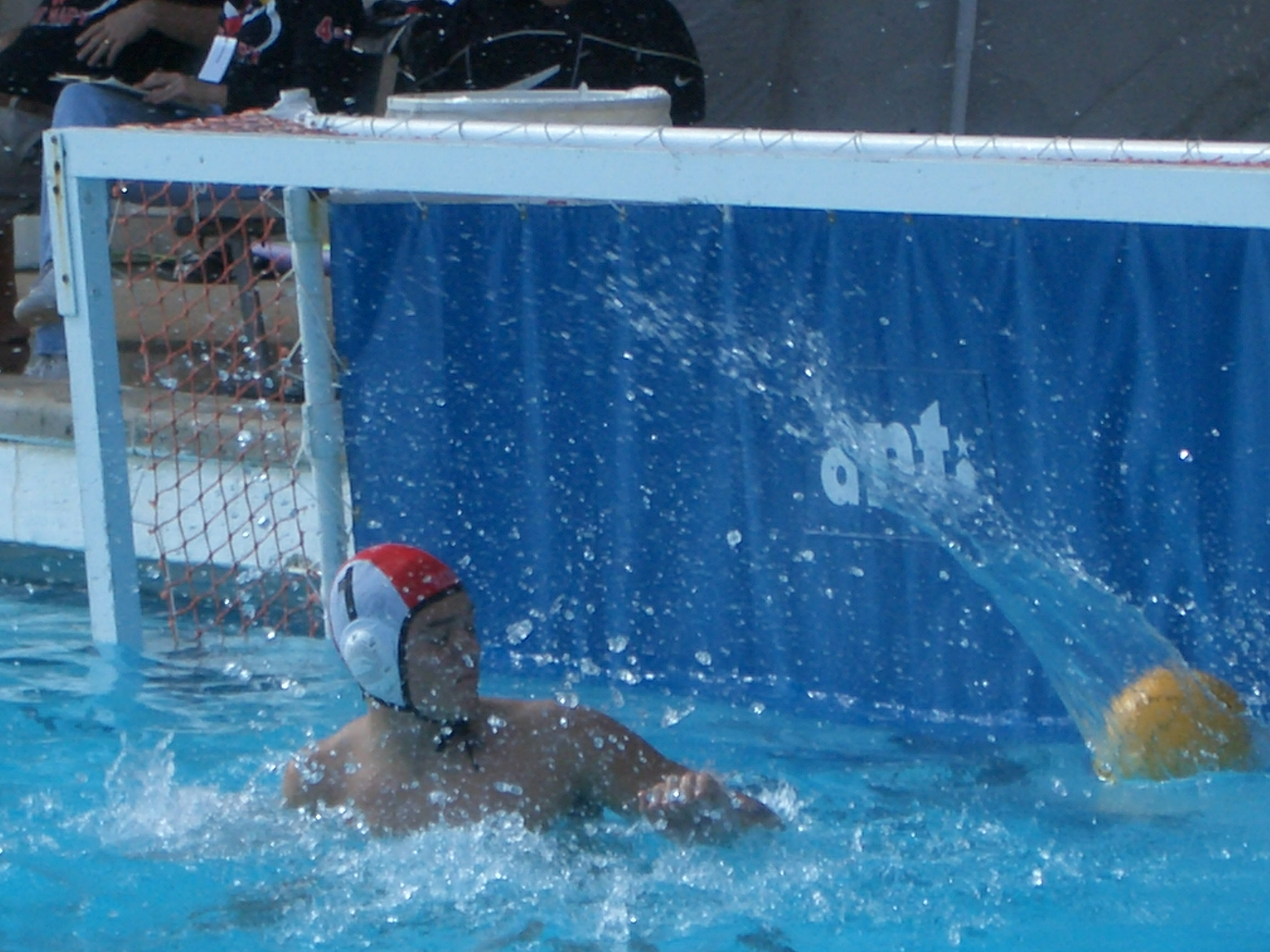
The lob shot has arched over the goalkeeper's head too high for him to reach it.

As blocking the ball is the primary role of the goalkeeper, they must have good knowledge of blocking techniques.

As the goalkeeper has the choice of how many hands they want to use, the decision should be made of what they want to do. A shot should be stopped with two hands either if it is weak or close to the goalkeeper's body, and normally stopped with one in other circumstances. This is because one-handed saves can go to the ball faster.

Goalkeepers should be wary of dummying, lob shots and skip or bounce shots. Dummying is where players fake shots, leading keepers to come out of the water too early. This can cause the goalkeeper to come up too early and have to go back down for energy. The lob shot is where a field player attempts to put the ball over where the goalkeeper's hands can reach. This usually happens either if the goalkeeper is out of position from the dummies or if they are too far out from the goal. The goalkeeper should swim back to try to block it, as it is nowhere near as fast as the power shot. The bounce or skip shot is where a player propels the ball at the water with enough force to make it bounce or skim along the water. It can take the goalkeeper by surprise as they cannot predict the direction the ball will go.

Most shots are saved with the arms or the hands, but goalkeepers are known to save shots with their faces and even feet.
