= World Club Water Polo Challenge =

International water polo competition

The World Club Water Polo Challenge was an annual four-day international water polo event, staged at the Drummoyne Swimming Centre in Sydney, Australia from 2014. This competition was held three times from 2014 to 2016.

== History ==
Edition	Year	Location	(gold) Gold	(silver) Silver	(bronze) Bronze
I	2014	Sydney, Australia	(Serbia) VK Radnički Kragujevac	(Turkey) Galatasaray men's water polo team	(Australia) UNSW Wests Magpies
II	2015	Drummoyne Pool, Sydney, Australia	(Australia) UNSW Wests Magpies	Serbia men's national U20 water polo team	
III	2016	Sutherland Leisure Centre, Sydney, Australia	(United States) Olympic Club San Francisco	(Japan) Bourbon Kashiwazaki	(China) Gunangdong Derun
