= Water polo =

Competitive team sport played in water

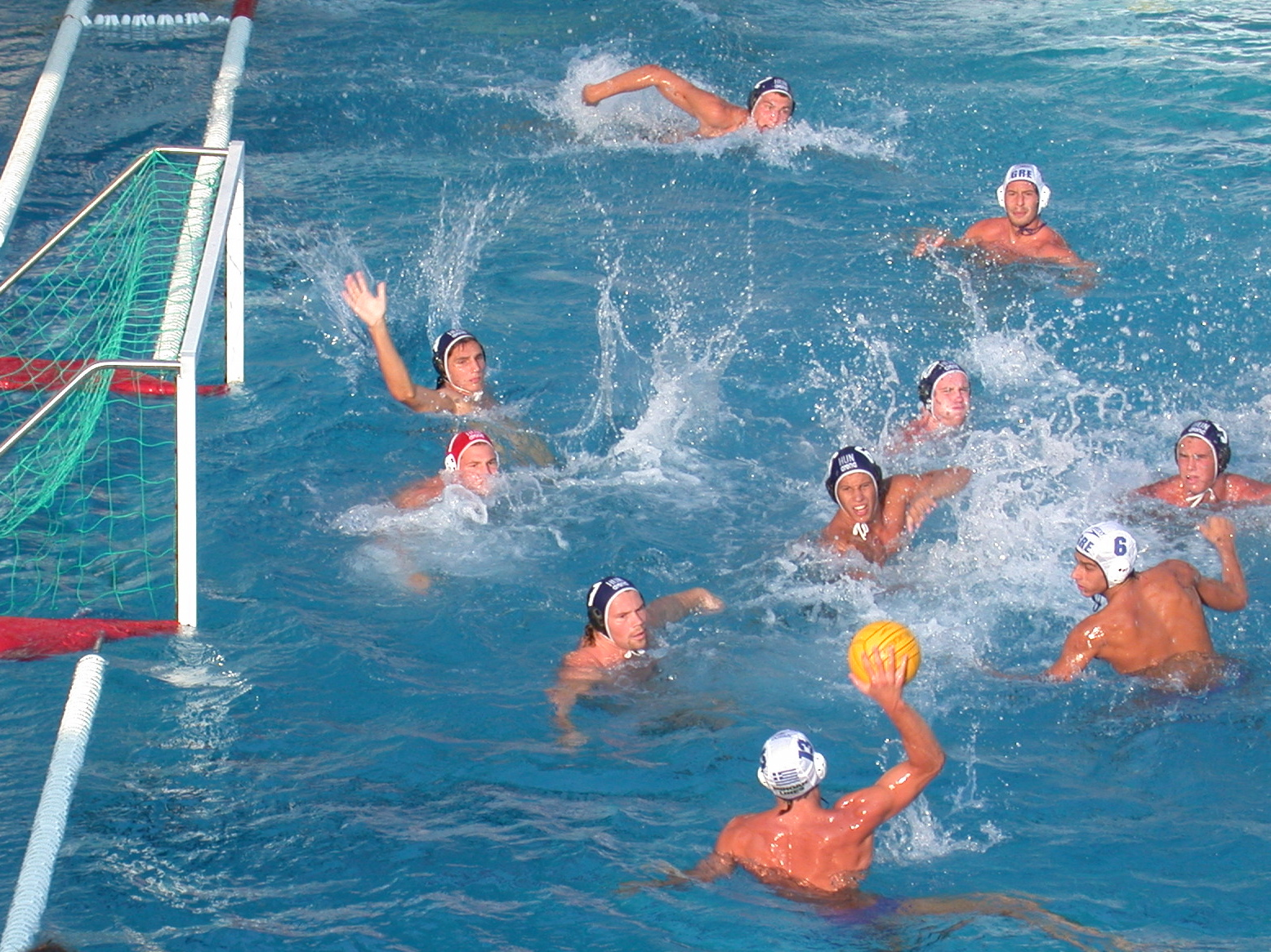
- Greece (white) and Hungary (blue) play a water polo match at the World Junior Championships 2004 in Naples, Italy.
- Highest governing body: World Aquatics
- Nicknames: Polo, wopo, waterfootball, poolball
- Created: 19th century, Scotland

Characteristics
- Contact: Full-contact
- Team members: 7 per side (6 field players and 1 goalkeeper)
- Mixed-sex: Separate competitions
- Type: Aquatic sport, team sport, ball sport
- Equipment: Water polo ball, water polo goal, water polo cap
- Venue: Water polo pool
- Glossary: Glossary of water polo

Presence
- Country or region: Worldwide
- Olympic: Part of the Summer Olympic programme since 1900; women's since 2000
- World Games: Women's: 1981

Water polo is a competitive team sport played in water between two teams of seven players each. The game consists of four quarters in which the teams attempt to score goals by throwing the ball into the opposing team's goal. The team with more goals at the end of the game wins the match. Each team is made up of six field players and one goalkeeper. Excluding the goalkeeper, players participate in both offensive and defensive roles. It is typically played in an all-deep pool where players cannot touch the bottom.

A game consists mainly of the players swimming to move about the pool, treading water (mainly using the eggbeater kick), passing the ball, and shooting at the goal. Teamwork, tactical thinking and awareness are also highly important aspects. Water polo is a highly physical and demanding sport and has frequently been cited as one of the most difficult to play.

Special equipment for water polo includes a water polo ball, a ball of varying colors which floats on the water; numbered and coloured caps; and two goals, which either float in the water or are attached to the sides of the pool.

The game is thought to have originated in Scotland in the mid-19th century; specifically, William Wilson is thought to have developed it in the 1870s as a sort of "water rugby". The game further developed with the formation of the London Water Polo League and has since expanded, becoming popular in parts of Europe, the United States, China, Canada, and Australia.

== History ==
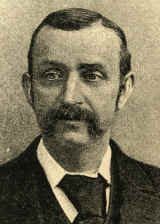
William Wilson, Scottish aquatics pioneer and originator of the first rules of water polo

The history of water polo as a team sport began as a demonstration of strength and swimming skill in mid-19th century England and Scotland, where water sports and racing exhibitions were a feature of county fairs and festivals. Men's water polo was among the first team sports introduced at the modern Olympic games in 1900. The present-day game involves teams of seven players (plus up to six substitutes), with a water polo ball similar in size to a soccer ball but constructed of air-tight nylon.

One of the earliest recorded viewings of water polo was conducted at the 4th Open Air Fete of the London Swimming Club, held at the Crystal Palace, London on 15 September 1873. Another antecedent of the modern game of water polo was a game of water 'handball' played at Bournemouth on 13 July 1876. This was a game between 12 members of the Premier Rowing Club, with goals being marked by four flags placed in the water near to the midpoint of Bournemouth Pier. The game started at 6:00 pm and lasted for 15 minutes (when the ball burst) watched by a large crowd; with plans being made for play on a larger scale the following week.

The rules of water polo were originally developed in the late nineteenth century in Great Britain by William Wilson. Wilson is believed to have been the First Baths Master of the Arlington Baths Club in Glasgow. The first games of 'aquatic football' were played at the Arlington in the late 19th century (the club was founded in 1870), with a ball constructed of India rubber. This "water rugby" came to be called "water polo" based on the English pronunciation of the Balti word for ball, pulu. Early play allowed brute strength, wrestling and holding opposing players underwater to recover the ball. Players held underwater for lengthy periods usually surrendered possession. The goalie stood outside the playing area and defended the goal by jumping in on any opponent attempting to score by placing the ball on the deck.

== Geography ==
Water polo is now popular in many countries around the world, notably Europe (particularly in Spain, France, Netherlands, Germany, Italy, Croatia, Hungary, Serbia, Montenegro, Greece and Romania), Australia, Canada and the United States.

Some countries have two principal competitions: a more prestigious league which is typically a double round-robin tournament restricted to the elite clubs, and a cup which is a single-elimination tournament open to both the elite and lesser clubs.

== Rules ==
The rules of water polo cover the play, procedures, equipment and officiating of water polo. These rules are similar throughout the world, although slight variations to the rules occur regionally and depending on the governing body. Governing bodies of water polo include World Aquatics, the international governing organization; European Aquatics, which governs international European matches; the NCAA, which governs collegiate matches in the United States; the NFHS, which governs high schools in the US, and the IOC, which governs Olympic events.

== Positions ==
There are seven players in the water from each team at one time. There are six players that play out and one goalkeeper. Unlike most common team sports, there is little positional play; field players will often fill several positions throughout the game as situations demand. These positions usually consist of a center forward, a center back, the two wing players and the two drivers. Players who are skilled in all positions of offense or defense are called utility players. Utility players tend to come off of the bench, though this is not absolute. Certain body types are more suited for particular positions, and left-handed players are especially coveted on the right-hand side of the field, allowing teams to launch two-sided attacks.

=== Offense ===
The offensive positions include: one center forward (also called a "set", "hole-set", "center", "setter", "hole", or "2-meter man", located on or near the 2-meter, roughly in the center of the goal), two wings (located on or near the 2-meter, just outside of the goal posts, respectively), two drivers (also called "flats", located on or near the 5-meter, roughly at the goal posts, respectively), and one "point" (usually just behind the 5 meter, roughly in the center of the goal, respectively), positioned farthest from the goal. The wings, drivers and point are often called the perimeter players; while the hole-set directs play. There is a typical numbering system for these positions in U.S. NCAA men's division one polo. Beginning with the offensive wing to the opposing goalie's right side is called one. The flat in a counter clockwise from one is called two. Moving along in the same direction the point player is three, the next flat is four, the final wing is five, and the hole set is called six. Additionally, the position in which a player is can give advantages based on a player's handedness, to improve a shooting or passing angle (for example, the right wing is often left handed).

The center sets up in front of the opposing team's goalie and scores the most individually (especially during lower level play where flats do not have the required strength to effectively shoot from outside or to penetrate and then pass to teammates like the point guard in basketball, or center midfield player in soccer). The center's position nearest to the goal allows explosive shots from close-range.

=== Defense ===
Defensive positions are often the same, but just switched from offence to defence. For example, the centre forward or hole set, who directs the attack on offence, on defence is known as "hole D" (also known as set guard, hole guard, hole check, pit defence or two-metre defence), and guards the opposing team's centre forward (also called the hole). Defence can be played man-to-man or in zones, such as a 2–4 (four defenders along the goal line). It can also be played as a combination of the two in what is known as an "M drop" defence, in which the point defender moves away ("sloughs off") his man into a zone in order to better defend the centre position. In this defence, the two wing defenders split the area furthest from the goal, allowing them a clearer lane for the counter-attack if their team recovers the ball.

=== Goalkeeper ===
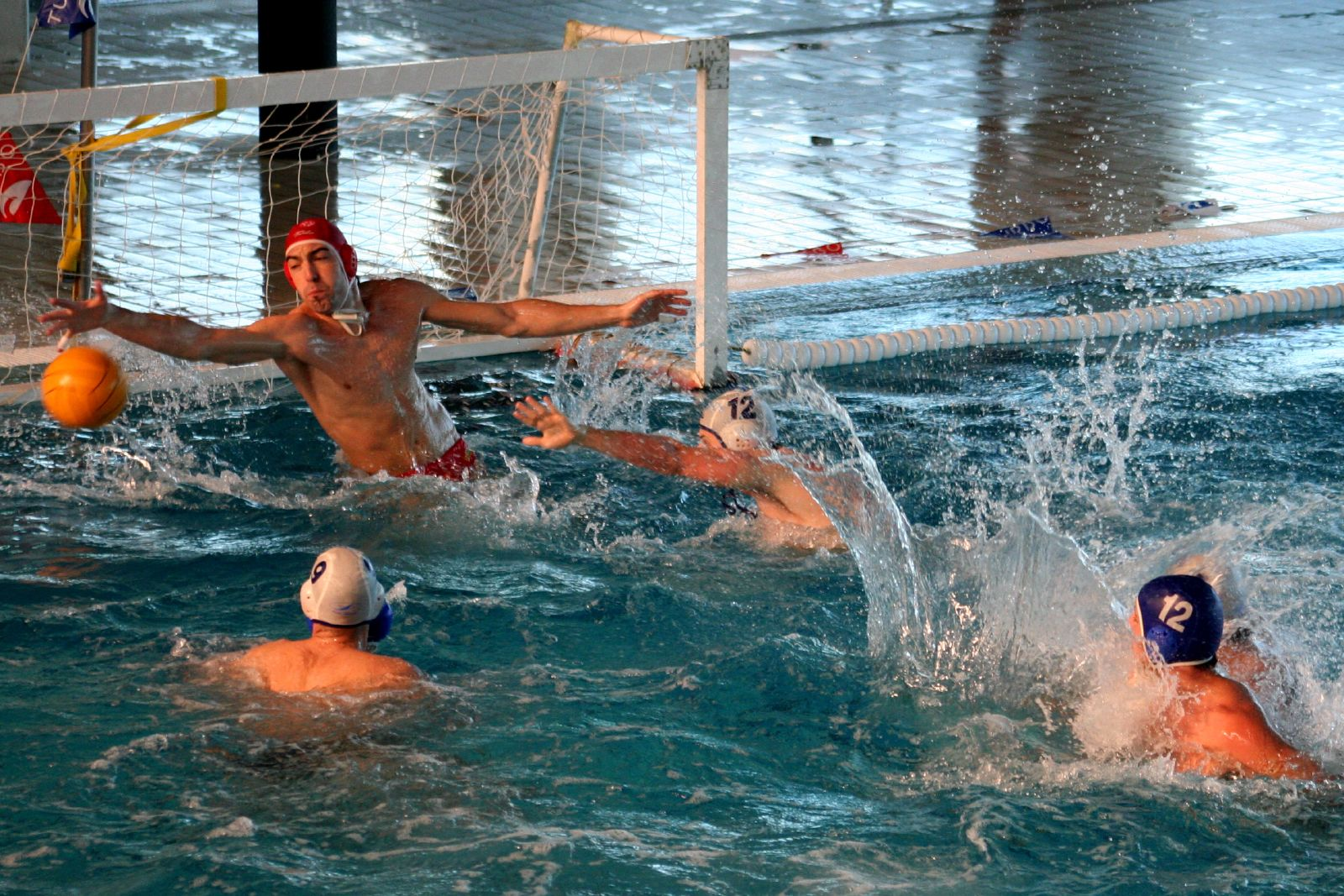
Goalkeeper blocking a shot

The goalkeeper has the main role in blocking shots against the goal as well as guiding and informing their defense of imposing threats and gaps in the defense. The goalkeeper usually begins the offensive play by passing the ball across the pool to an attacker. It is not unusual for a goalkeeper to make an assisting pass to a goal on a break away.

The goalkeeper is given several privileges above those of the other players, but only within the five-meter area in front of their own goal:

- The ability to punch the ball with a clenched fist,
- The ability to touch the ball with two hands.

In general, a foul that would cause an ejection of a field player might bring on a five-metre shot on the goalkeeper. Also, if a goalkeeper pushes the ball under water, the action will not be punished with a turnover like with field players, but with a penalty shot.

== Common techniques and practices ==
=== Offense strategy ===
==== Player positioning ====
The most basic positional set up is known as a "3–3", so called because there are two lines in front of the opponent's goal. Another set up, used more by professional teams, is known as an "arc", "umbrella", or "mushroom"; perimeter players form the shape of an arc around the goal, with the hole set as the handle or stalk. Yet another option for offensive set is called a 4–2 or double hole; there are two center forward offensive players in front of the goal. Double hole is most often used in "man up" situations, or when the defense has only one skilled "hole D", or to draw in a defender and then pass out to a perimeter player for a shot ("kick out").

Another, albeit less common offense, is the "motion c", sometimes nicknamed "washing machine offence", in which two "weak-side" (to the right of the goal for right-handed players) perimeter players set up as a wing and a flat. The remaining four players swim in square pattern in which a player swims from the point to the hole and then out to the strong side wing. The wing moves to the flat and the flat to the point. The weak side wing and flat then control the tempo of play and try to make passes into the player driving towards the centre forward who can then either shoot or pass. This form of offence is used when no dominate hole set is available, or the hole defence is too strong. It is also seen much more often in women's water polo where teams may lack a player of sufficient size or strength to set up in the centre forward. The best advantage to this system is it makes man-coverage much more difficult for the defender and allows the offence to control the game tempo better once the players are "set up". The main drawback is this constant motion can be very tiring as well as somewhat predictable as to where the next pass is going to go.

==== Advancing the ball ====
When the offence takes possession of the ball, the strategy is to advance the ball down the field of play and to score a goal. Players can move the ball by throwing it to a teammate or swimming with the ball in front of them (dribbling). If an attacker uses their arm to push away a defending player and free up space for a pass or shot, the referee will rule a turnover and the defence will take possession of the ball. If an attacker advances inside the 2-metre line without the ball or before the ball is inside the 2-metre area, they are ruled offside and the ball is turned over to the defence. This is often overlooked if the attacker is well to the side of the pool or when the ball is at the other side of the pool.

==== Setting the ball ====
The key to the offence is to accurately pass (or "set") the ball into the centre forward or hole set, positioned directly in front of the goal ("the hole"). Any field player may throw the hole set a "wet pass". A wet pass is one that hits the water just outside the hole set's reach. A dry pass may also be used. This is where the hole set receives the ball directly in his hand and then attempts a shot at the cage. This pass is much more difficult because if the pass is not properly caught, the officials will be likely to call an offensive foul resulting in a change of ball possession. The hole set attempts to take possession of the ball [after a wet pass], to shoot at the goal, or to draw a foul from his defender. A minor foul is called if his defender (called the "hole D") attempts to impede movement before the hole set has possession. The referee indicates the foul with one short whistle blow and points one hand to the spot of the foul and the other hand in the direction of the attack of the team to whom the free throw has been awarded. The hole set then has a "reasonable amount of time" (typically about three seconds; there is no FINA rule on this issue) to re-commence play by making a free pass to one of the other players. The defensive team cannot hinder the hole set until the free throw has been taken, but the hole set cannot shoot a goal once the foul has been awarded until the ball has been played by at least one other player. If the hole set attempts a goal without the free throw, the goal is not counted and the defence takes possession of the ball, unless the shot is made outside the 5-metre line. As soon as the hole set has a free pass, the other attacking players attempt to swim (or drive) away from their defenders towards the goal. The players at the flat position will attempt to set a screen (also known as a pick) for the driver. If a driver gets free from a defender, the player calls for the pass from the hole set and attempts a shot at the goal.

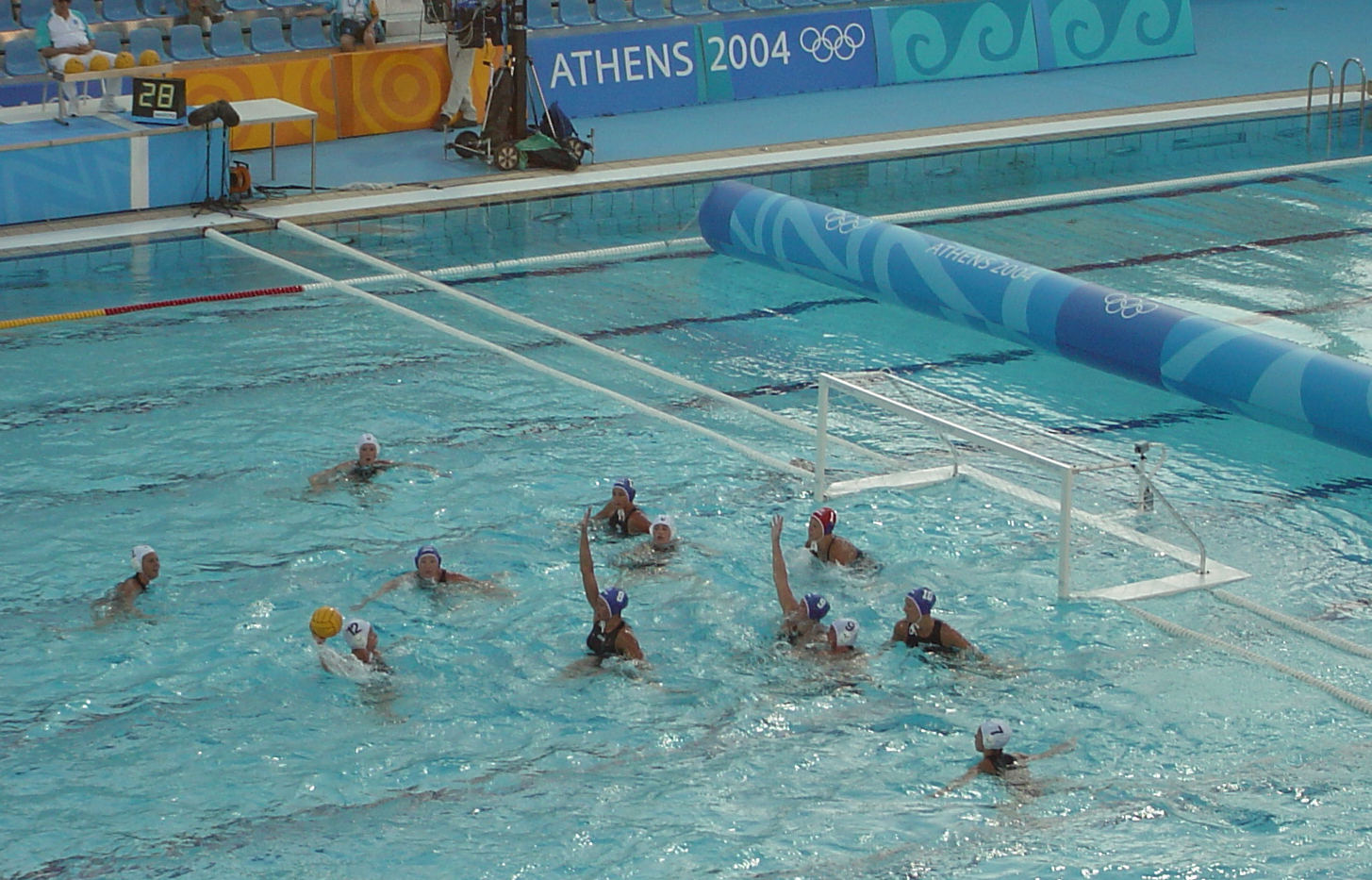
A classic 4–2 man-up situation. The attacking white team has 4 players positioned on 2 metres, and 2 players positioned on 4 metres. The 5 outfield defending blue players try to block shots and prevent a goal being scored for the 20 seconds of man-down play. In the top left corner, the shot clock can be seen, showing 28 seconds remaining in the white attack.

==== Man-Up (5 on 6) ====
The Man-Up strategy first evolved in the mid-1970s after the introduction of the exclusion foul by international rulemakers. If a defender interferes with a free throw, holds or sinks an attacker who is not in possession or splashes water into the face of an opponent, the defensive player is excluded from the game for twenty seconds, known as an exclusion foul. The attacking team typically positions 4 players on the 2 metre line, and 2 players on 5 metre line (4–2), passing the ball around until an open player attempts a shot. Other formations include a 3–3 (two lines of three attackers each) or arc (attackers make an arc in front of the goal and one offensive player sits in the 'hole' or 'pit' in front of the goal). The five defending players try to pressure the attackers, block shots and prevent a goal being scored for the 20 seconds while they are a player down. The other defenders can only block the ball with one hand to help the goalkeeper. The defensive player is allowed to return immediately if the offence scores, or if the defence recovers the ball before the twenty seconds expires.

=== Defense strategy ===
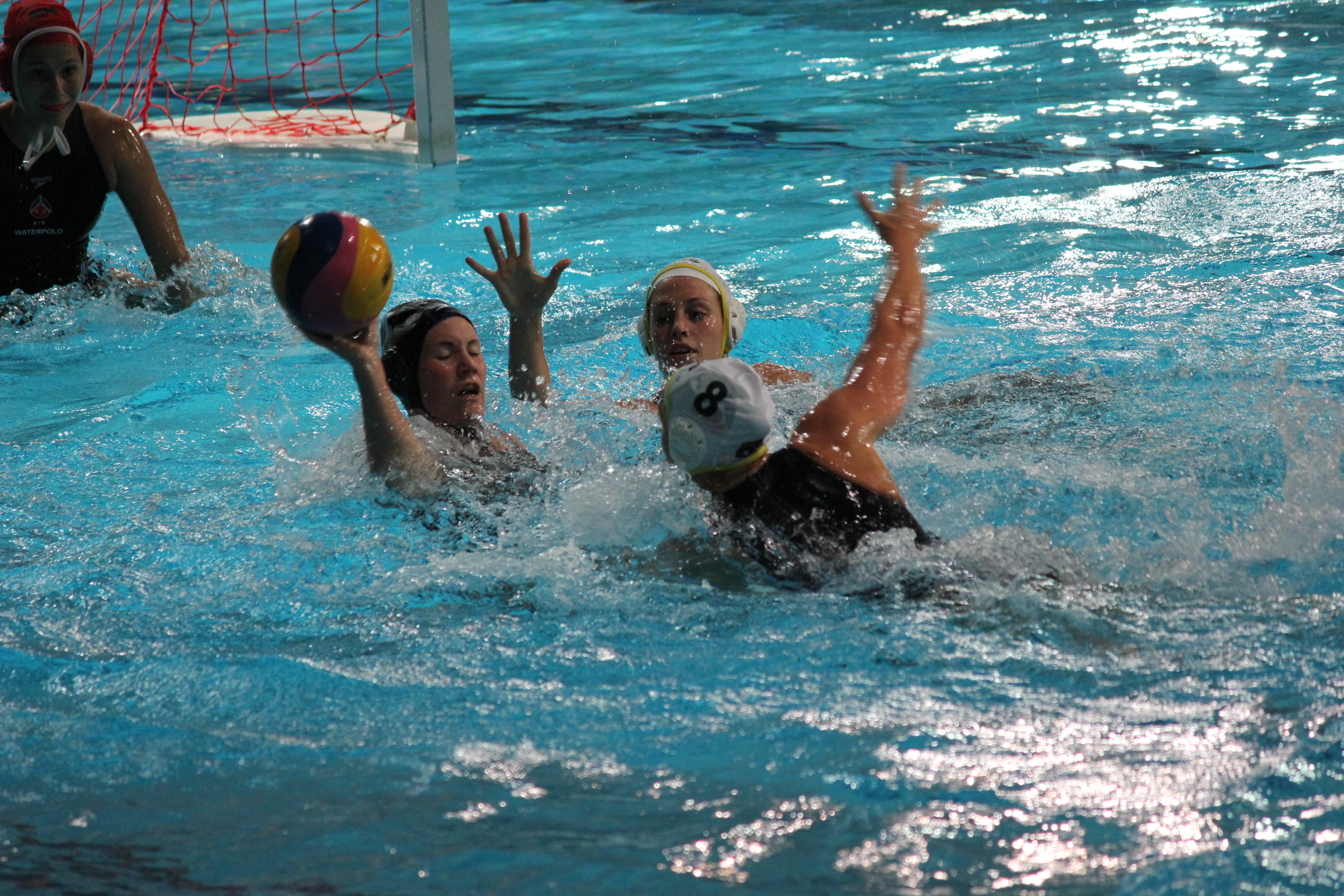
Water polo defense: A defender may only hold, block or pull an opponent who is touching or holding the ball.

On defense, the players work to regain possession of the ball and to prevent a goal in their own net. The defence attempts to knock away or steal the ball from the offense or to commit a foul in order to stop an offensive player from taking a goal shot. The defender attempts to stay between the attacker and the goal, a position known as inside water.

==== Goalkeeper ====
Even with good backup from the rest of the defenders, stopping attacks can prove very difficult if the goalkeeper remains in the middle of the goal. The most defensible position is along a semicircular line connecting the goalposts and extending out in the centre. Depending on the ball carrier's location, the goalkeeper is positioned along that semicircle roughly a metre out of the goal to reduce the attacker's shooting angle. The goalkeeper stops using their hands to tread water once the opponent enters at about the 7-metre mark and starts to lift their upper body using the eggbeater technique to prepare to block the shot. Finally, the goalkeeper tries to block the ball down, which is often hard for the longer reaches, but prevents an offensive rebound and second shot. As is the case with other defensive players, a goalkeeper who aggressively fouls an attacker in position to score can be charged with a penalty shot for the other team. The goalkeeper can also be ejected for twenty seconds if a major foul is committed. Also, inside the five metre mark, the goalie can swing at the ball with a closed fist without being penalised.

==== Advantage rule ====
If an offensive player, such as the centre forward, has possession of the ball in front of the goal, the defensive player tries to steal the ball or to keep the centre from shooting or passing. If the defender cannot achieve these aims, he may commit a foul intentionally. The hole set then is given a free throw but must pass off the ball to another offensive player, rather than making a direct shot at the goal. Defensive perimeter players may also intentionally cause a minor foul and then move toward the goal, away from their attacker, who must take a free throw. This technique, called sloughing, allows the defense an opportunity to double-team the hole set and possibly steal the inbound pass. The referee may refrain from declaring a foul, if in his judgment this would give the advantage to the offender's team. This is known as the Advantage Rule.

== Injuries ==
Water polo is a contact sport, with little protective gear besides swimsuits and caps with ear protectors, and thus injuries are common. Among the most frequent serious injuries are those affecting the head and shoulders. Those induced to the head are usually caused by elbows or the ball itself, while shoulder injuries are a result of grabbing and pushing while throwing the ball or simply of repetitive overexertion of joints and muscles when taking hard shots. The hands and fingers are vulnerable areas, due to contact when opponents attempt to steal the ball, or when players block shots. Other injuries take place underwater, such as leg and groin injuries, as many actions cannot be seen from above the surface and not much padding is used to protect the players.

Sunburn is a common minor injury in outdoor matches. Players often don't apply sunscreen as it makes their skin, and hence the ball, slippery; FINA and most state governing bodies forbid the use of sunscreen to make the body harder for the opposing team to grip.

== Variations ==
Inner tube water polo is a style of water polo in which players, excluding the goalkeeper, are required to float in inner tubes. By floating in an inner tube players expend less energy than traditional water polo players, not having to tread water. This allows casual players to enjoy water polo without undertaking the intense conditioning required for conventional water polo.

Surf polo, another variation of water polo, is played on surfboards. First played on the beaches of Waikiki in Hawaii in the 1930s and 1940s, it is credited to Louis Kahanamoku, Duke Kahanamoku's brother.

Canoe polo or kayak polo is one of the eight disciplines of canoeing pursued in the UK, known simply as "polo" by its aficionados. Polo combines paddling and ball handling skills with a contact team game, where tactics and positional play are as important as the speed and fitness of the individual athletes.

Flippa ball is a precursor variant intended for younger and beginner players to learn the basics of polo. In Singapore it has been adopted as a fitness activity for senior citizens. It is played in shallow water and permits touching the bottom of the pool so treading water is not required. Players rotate positions after each score.

4x4 water polo is a variation involving a smaller field of play and only 4 active players at a time from each team. International play and world championships for 4x4 water polo are administered by World Aquatics.

== Water polo equipment ==
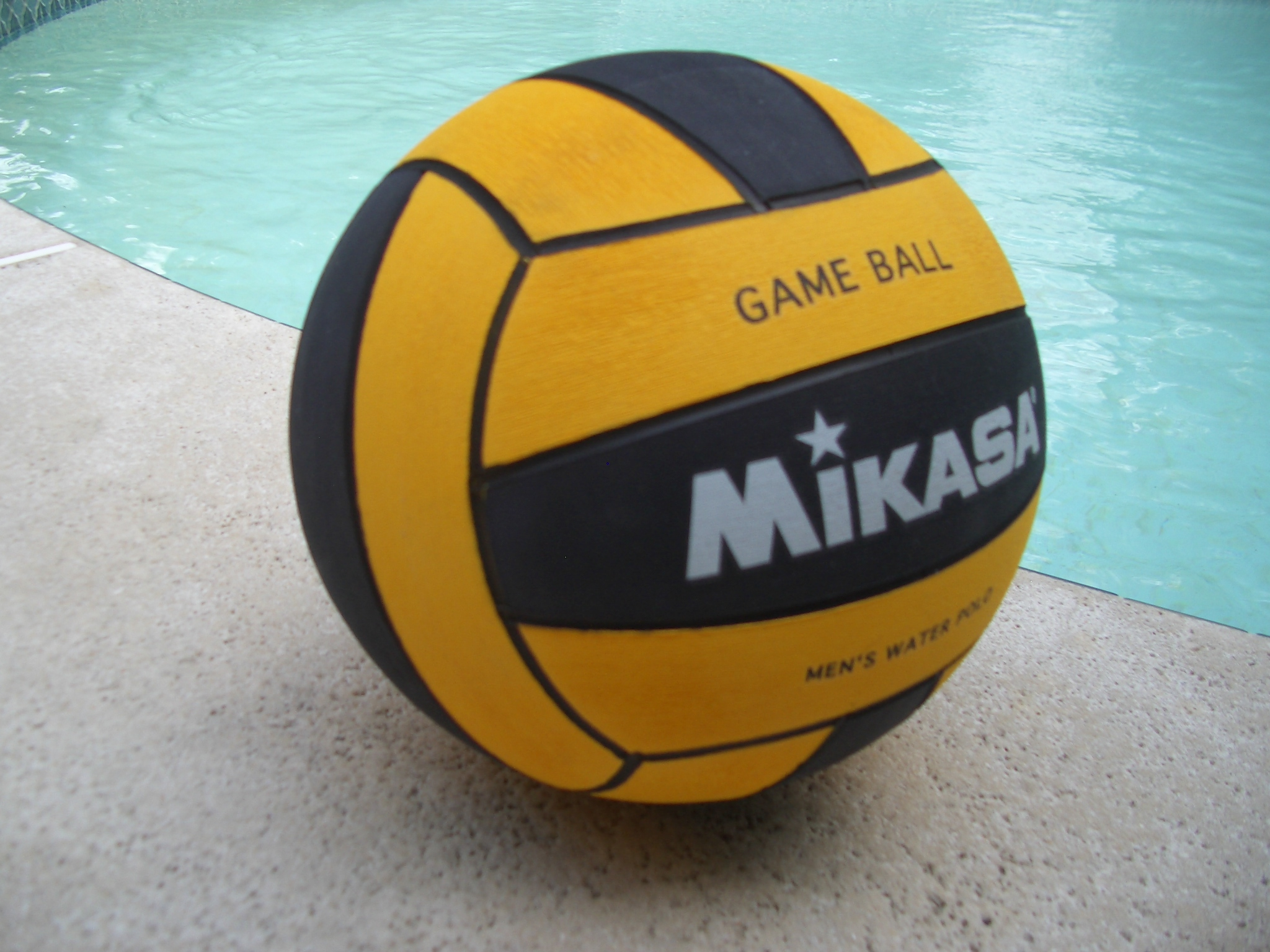
Water polo balls: old (left) and new designs

Little player equipment is needed to play water polo. Items required in water polo include:

- Ball: A water polo ball is constructed of waterproof material to allow it to float on the water. The cover is textured to give players additional grip. The size of the ball is different for men's, women's and junior games.
- Caps: A water polo cap is used to protect the players' heads and ears, and to make them identifiable from afar. Home team field players wear numbered dark-colored caps; Visiting team field players wear numbered white caps. Both starting goalkeepers wear red caps (sometimes quartered), numbered "1" (substitute goalies' caps are numbered either "13" for FINA international play or "15" for NCAA play) Caps are fitted with ear protectors.
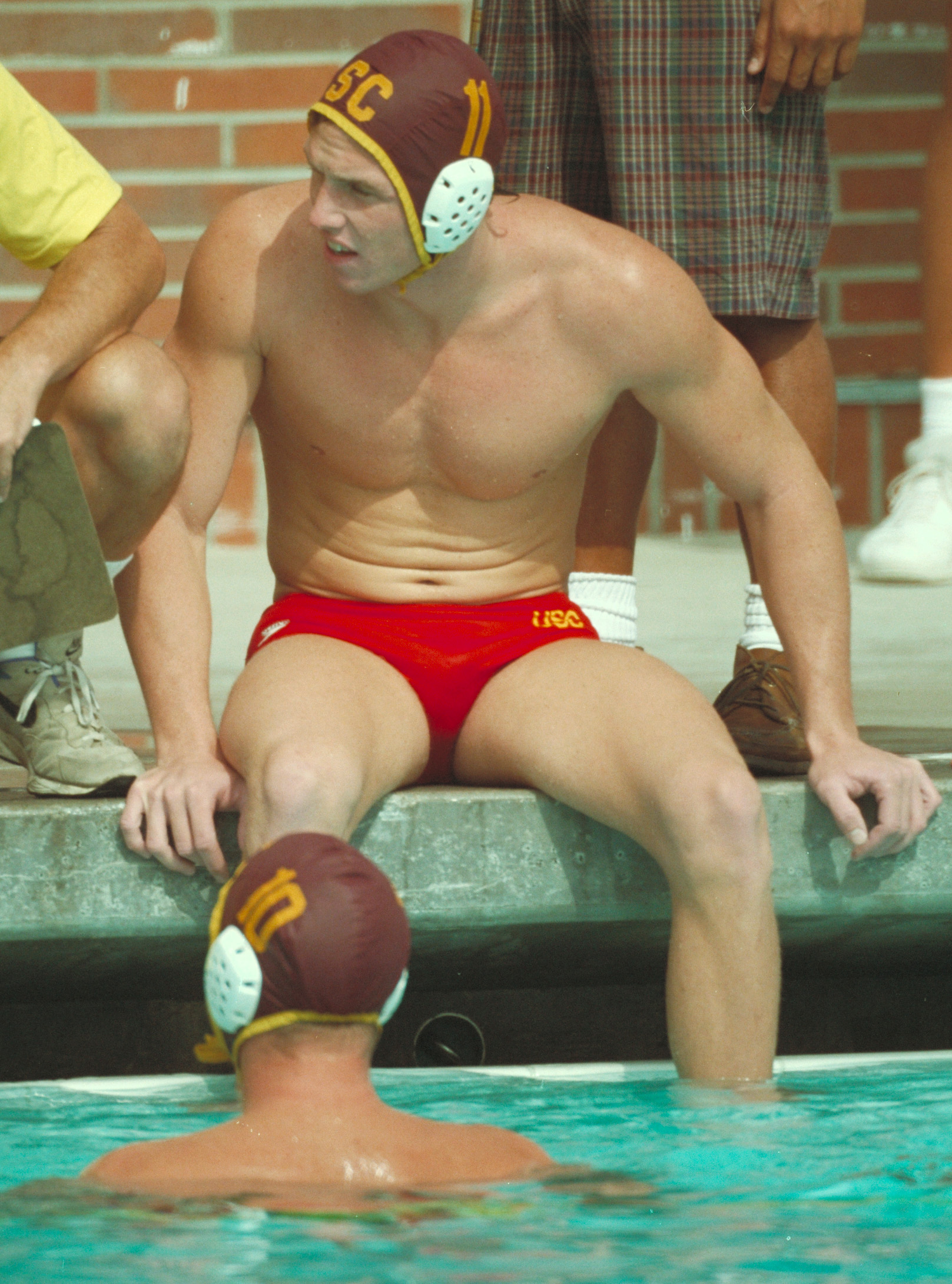
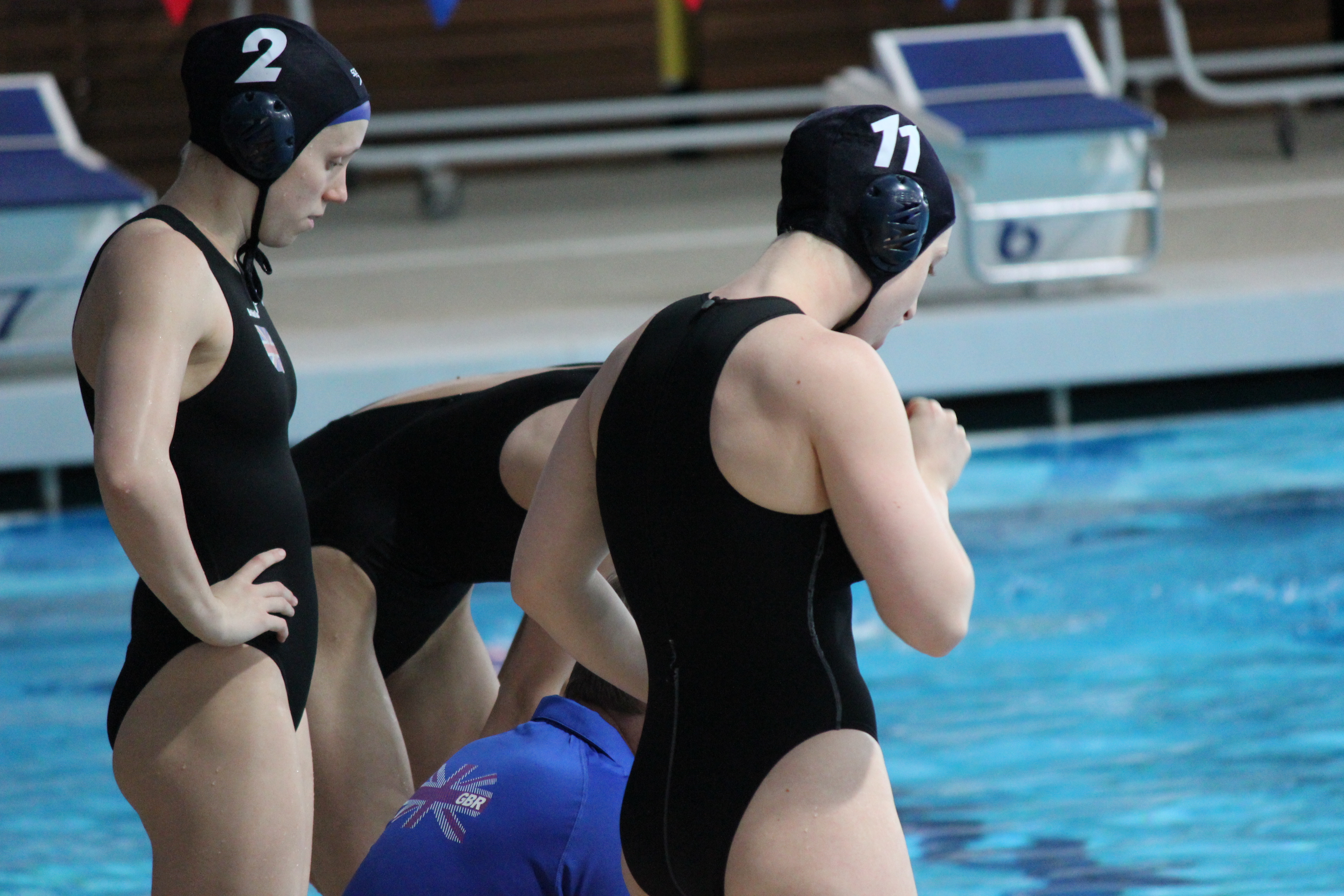
Male swimsuit (left) and Female swimsuit (right)
- Goals: Two goals are needed in order to play water polo. These can either be put on the side of the pool, or in the pool using floaters.
- Mouthguard: A mouthguard is not mandatory in most tournaments but is recommended.
- Swimwear: Male water polo players wear either swim briefs or jammers (thigh-length trunks). Female players must wear a one-piece swimsuit. Suit-grabbing fouls are common, so players often wear tight-fitting suits, and may layer on several suits at a time for additional security. Many swimwear labels also sell specialized water polo suits that feature reinforced stitching and tougher fabric. Female water polo suits are generally one-piece outfits which do not have open backs, but zip securely up the back so as to not have straps that can be easily grabbed.

== Major competitions ==
=== Summer Olympics ===
Men's water polo at the Olympics was the first team sport introduced at the 1900 games, along with cricket, rugby, football, polo (with horses), rowing and tug of war. Women's water polo became an Olympic sport at the 2000 Sydney Olympic Games after political protests from the Australian women's team.

One of the most historically known matches often referred to as the Blood in the Water match, was a 1956 Summer Olympics semi-final match between Hungary and the Soviet Union, played in Melbourne. As the athletes left for the games, the Hungarian revolution began, and the Soviet army crushed the uprising. The Hungarians defeated the Soviets 4–0 before the game was called off in the final minute to prevent angry Hungarians in the crowd reacting to Valentin Prokopov punching Ervin Zádor.

=== Other tournaments ===
Every 2 to 4 years since 1973, a men's Water Polo World Championship is organized within the FINA World Aquatics Championships. Women's water polo was added in 1986. A second tournament series, the FINA Water Polo World Cup, has been held every other year since 1979. In 2002, FINA organised the sport's first international league, the FINA Water Polo World League.

There is also a European Water Polo Championship that is held every other year.

Professional water polo is played in many Southern and Eastern European countries like Croatia, Greece, Hungary, Italy, Montenegro, Russia, Serbia, and Spain, with the LEN Euroleague tournament played amongst the best teams.

There is also a World Club Water Polo Challenge. And the Junior Olympics for 10u-18u

== See also ==
- Swimming (sport)
- Synchronised swimming
- Water aerobics
- Water volleyball
- Underwater rugby

== General sources ==
- Giannouris, Yiannis (February 2020). "1870–2020 | 150 years of Water Polo – Evolution of its rules" (PDF). fina.org. FINA. Archived from the original (PDF) on 17 April 2021.
