= Eggbeater kick =

Style of swimmer kicking

The eggbeater kick is a style of kicking where the swimmer's legs alternate one-legged breaststroke kicks. This form provides continuous support because there is no break in the kick, and allows the swimmer to remain stable in the water without swaying. However, it can cause knee problems due to the circular rotation of the knee joint.

== Applications ==
The eggbeater kick is used in several different types of swimming activities.

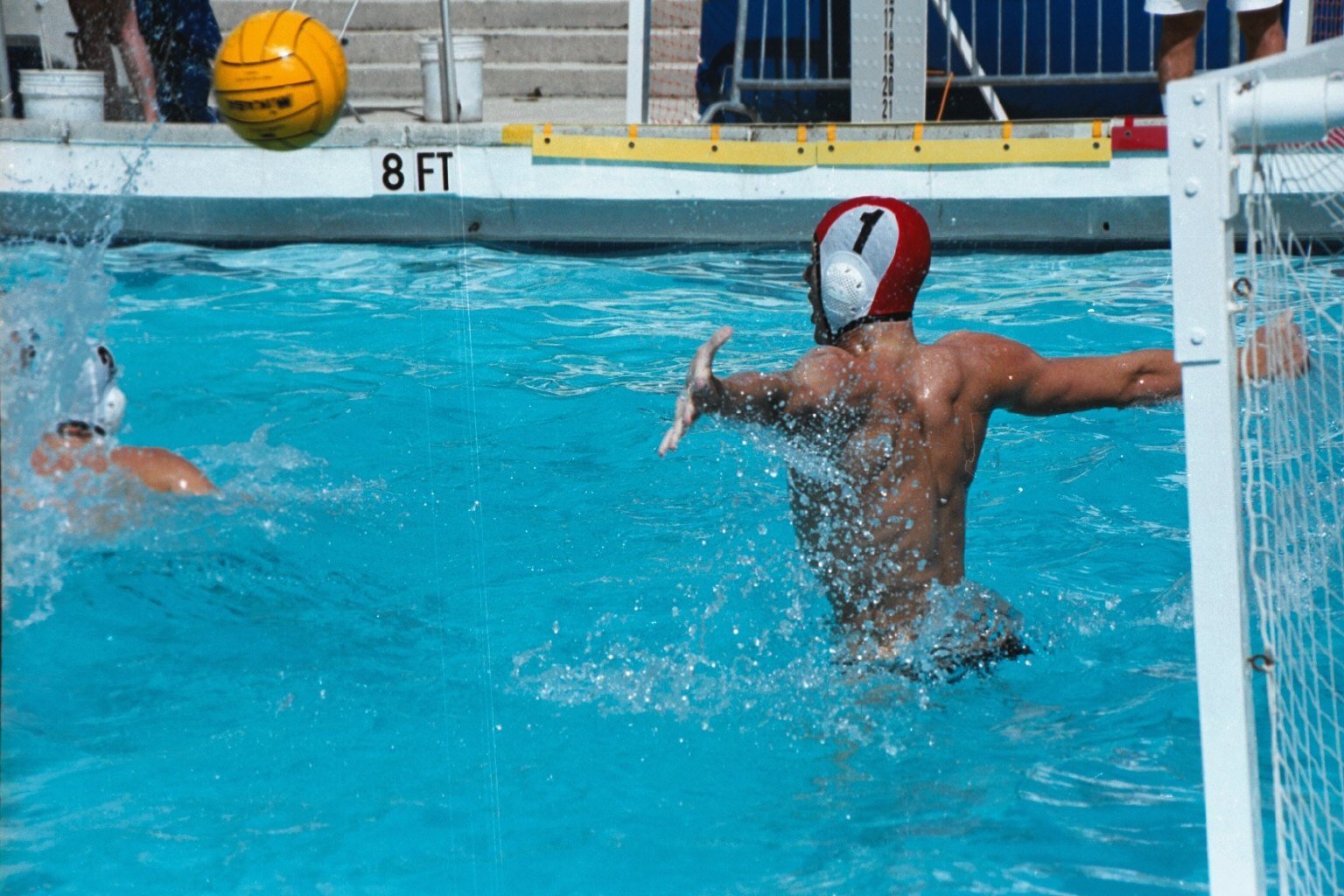
Water polo goalie eggbeater-kicks up to block a shot.

Water polo players use this style of kick so that their hands can be free to shoot, pass, dribble and control the ball. Water polo players need to perfect the eggbeater kick to have success. Goalkeepers must be able to do this especially as they need to have the power to get to the ball.

Synchronized swimmers use this style of kick, so that they can perform other important skills that require stabilization. The eggbeater kick allows swimmers to lift teammates out of the water.

Lifeguards use this kick because it allows greater stabilization of the upper body.

== Technique ==
The eggbeater kick is an alternating breaststroke kick. The steps for eggbeater are the same as in breast stroke, except you are doing one leg at a time.

1. Heel to butt, make sure you relax your foot on the way up
2. Turn your foot the outside of your body and flex
3. Kick out to the side
4. Point your foot and close

== Physics ==
The swimmer rotates their legs circularly while keeping their feet arched and angled, causing water above their foot to move faster than the water under their foot. This difference in pressure between the moving water and the surrounding water creates a force, propelling the swimmer. The faster the swimmer's feet move, the more propulsion they receive.
