= Junior Olympics =

Junior Olympics or Jr. Olympics may refer to:

- AAU Junior Olympic Games, annual competition for multiple sports sponsored by the US Amateur Athletic Union
- USA Gymnastics Junior Olympics Program

== See also ==
- International Children's Games
- Youth Olympic Games
