= William Wilson (aquatics) =

British journalist, swimming instructor and coach (1844–1912)

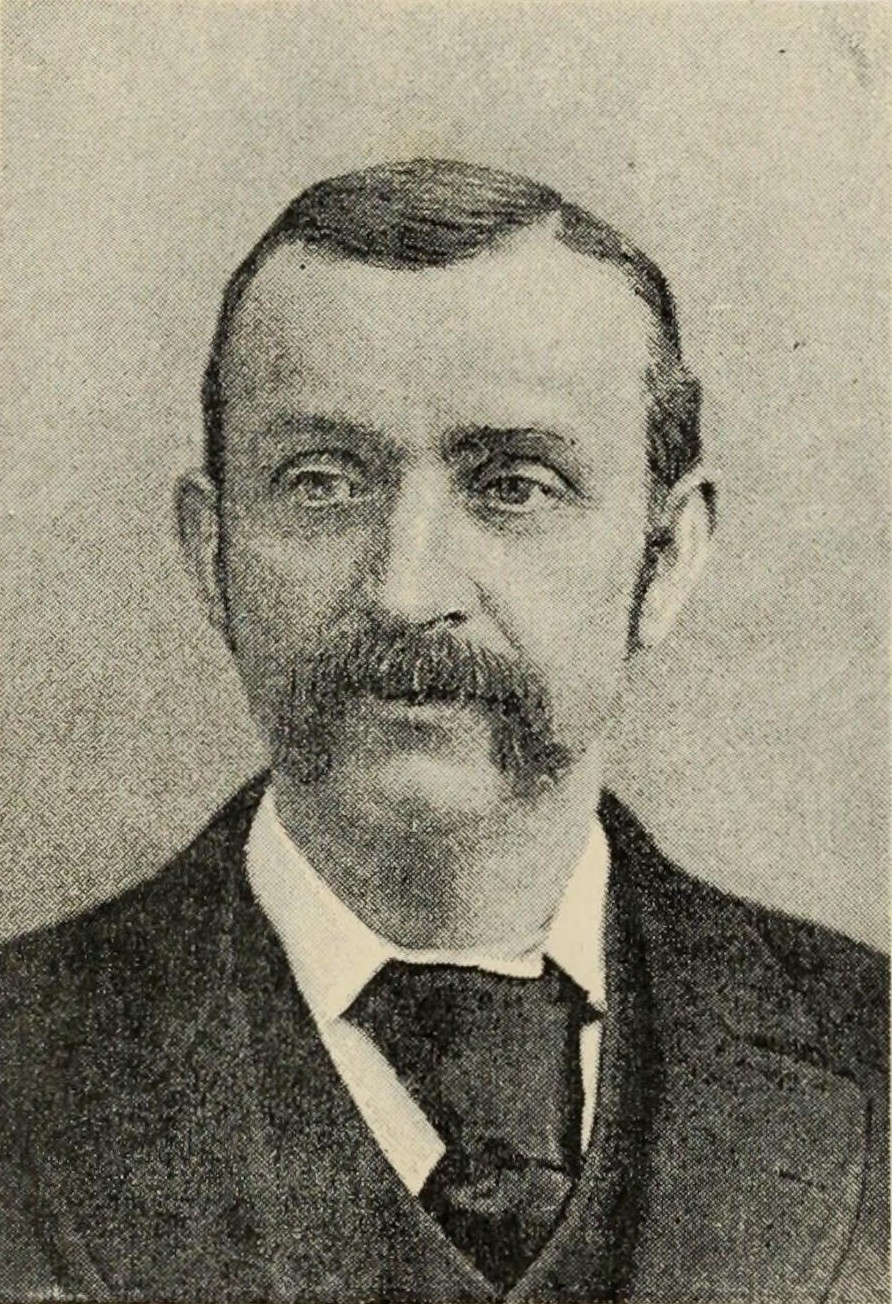
Photo of Wilson published 1892

William Wilson (13 November 1844 – 1 June 1912) was a late 19th-century British journalist, swimming instructor and coach, contributor to the scientific techniques behind competitive swimming, and originator of the game of water polo. In 1883, Wilson published "The Swimming Instructor," one of the first books on swimming to define modern concepts of stroke efficiency, training, racing turns and water safety.

== Water polo ==
In 1877, Wilson drew up a set of rules for a team water ball game, which he called "aquatic football". The first game took place between the banks of the River Dee at the Bon Accord Festival in Aberdeen, Scotland. Flags were placed eight or ten feet apart on the shore and players used a soft ball of Indian rubber, called a pulu. The game was a wrestling match from end to end of the field of play but was popular with the spectators of the aquatic festivals of the era. Wilson had developed the sport while Baths Master at the Arlington Baths Club in Glasgow.

In 1885, the Swimming Association of Great Britain, recognized the game, now called water polo, and formulated a set of rules expanding on Wilson's rulebook. These eventually became the basis of FINA international rules, as the sport spread to Europe, America and Australia.

== Lifesaving ==
In 1891, Wilson published a number of illustrated newspaper articles on lifesaving drills and awarded prizes to local swimming clubs for proficiency in lifesaving techniques. Wilson's methods circulated in the form of a handbook, and in recognition of his contribution, he was elected the first Life Governor of the Royal Lifesaving Society.
