= Water polo ball =

Ball used for water and canoe polo

Water polo balls are designed for ease of grip.

A water polo ball is a ball used in water polo and canoe polo, usually characterized by a bright yellow color and ease of grip ability, so as to allow it to be held with one hand despite its large size.

== Standard water polo ball characteristics ==
Water Polo Balls come in standard sizes:

- Size 5: Men's water polo ball. Circumference of the ball shall be not less than 0.68 metres and not more than 0.71 metres. Ball weight is 400-450 grams (14-16 ounces) and inflated to 90-97 kPa (kilopascals) gauge pressure (7.5-8.5psi)
- Size 4: Compact (age 14 & under boys) and Women's water polo ball. Circumference of the ball shall be not less than 0.65 metres and not more than 0.67 metres. Ball weight is 400-450 grams (14-16 ounces) and inflated to 83–90 kPa (12.0–13.1 psi) for women.
- Size 3: Intermediate (age 14 & under girls and 12 & under boys) water polo ball.
- Size 2: Junior (age 12 & under girls and 10 & under co-ed) water polo ball.
- Size 1: Splashball (age 8 and under boys and girls) water polo ball.

== Development of the water polo ball ==
The modern game originated in the late 19th century as a form of rugby football, played in rivers in England and Scotland, with a small 3 to 4 inch ball constructed of rubber imported from colonial plantations in India. This "water rugby" came to be called "water polo" based on the English pronunciation of the Balti word for ball, pulu. The original ball soon gave way to a football (soccer ball), which allowed for passing and swimming above water with the ball. However, the leather football absorbed water and became extremely heavy, slippery and out-of-control when wet. In 1936, James R. ("Jimmy") Smith, California water polo coach and author of several books on water polo mechanics, developed a ball made with an inflatable bladder and a rubber fabric cover, which improved performance. The new ball was red, but by 1948 yellow was adopted for better visibility by players. It became the official FINA and Olympic ball in 1956.

== Recent changes to water polo balls ==
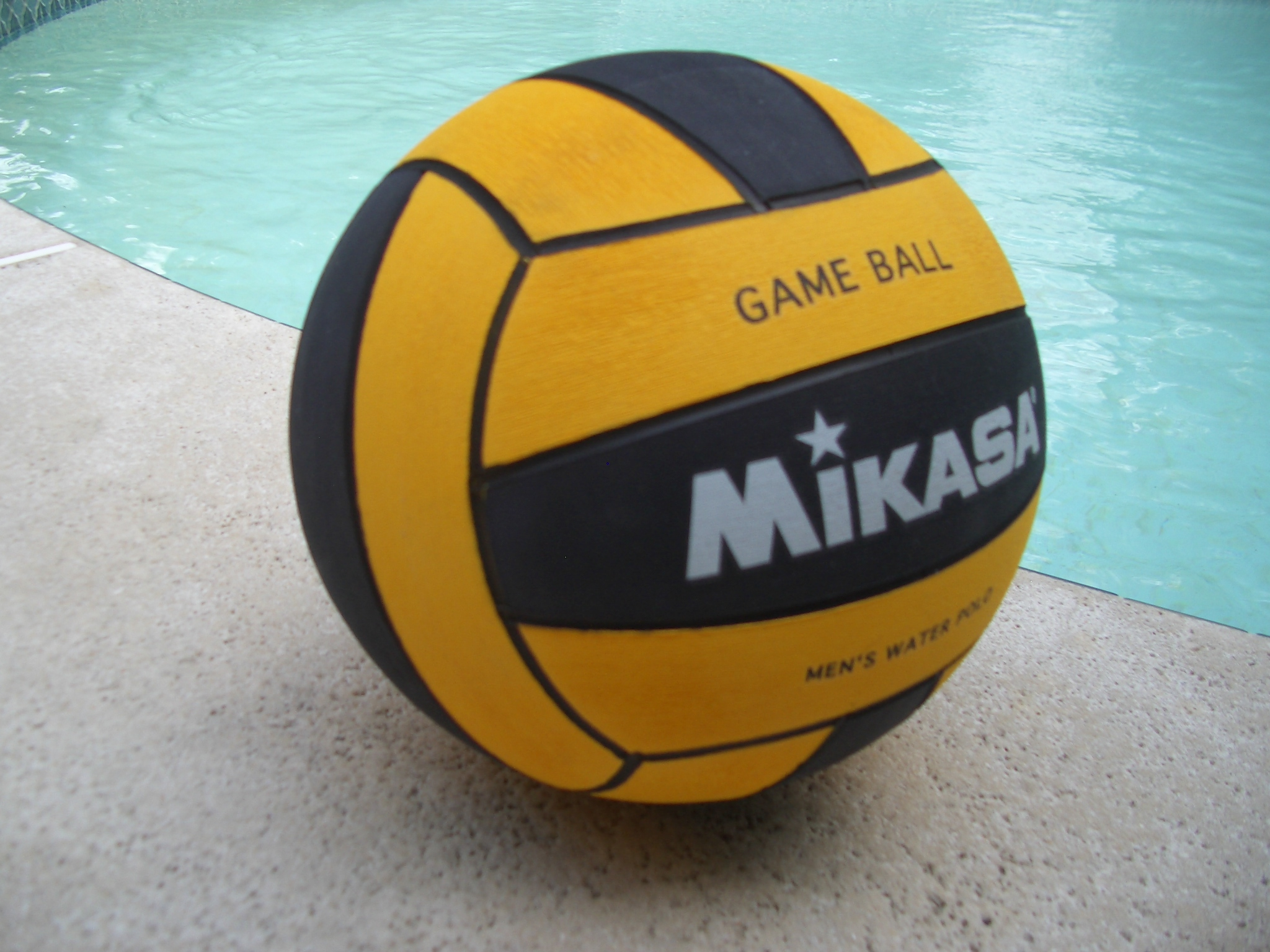
A new style of water polo ball introduced in 2005

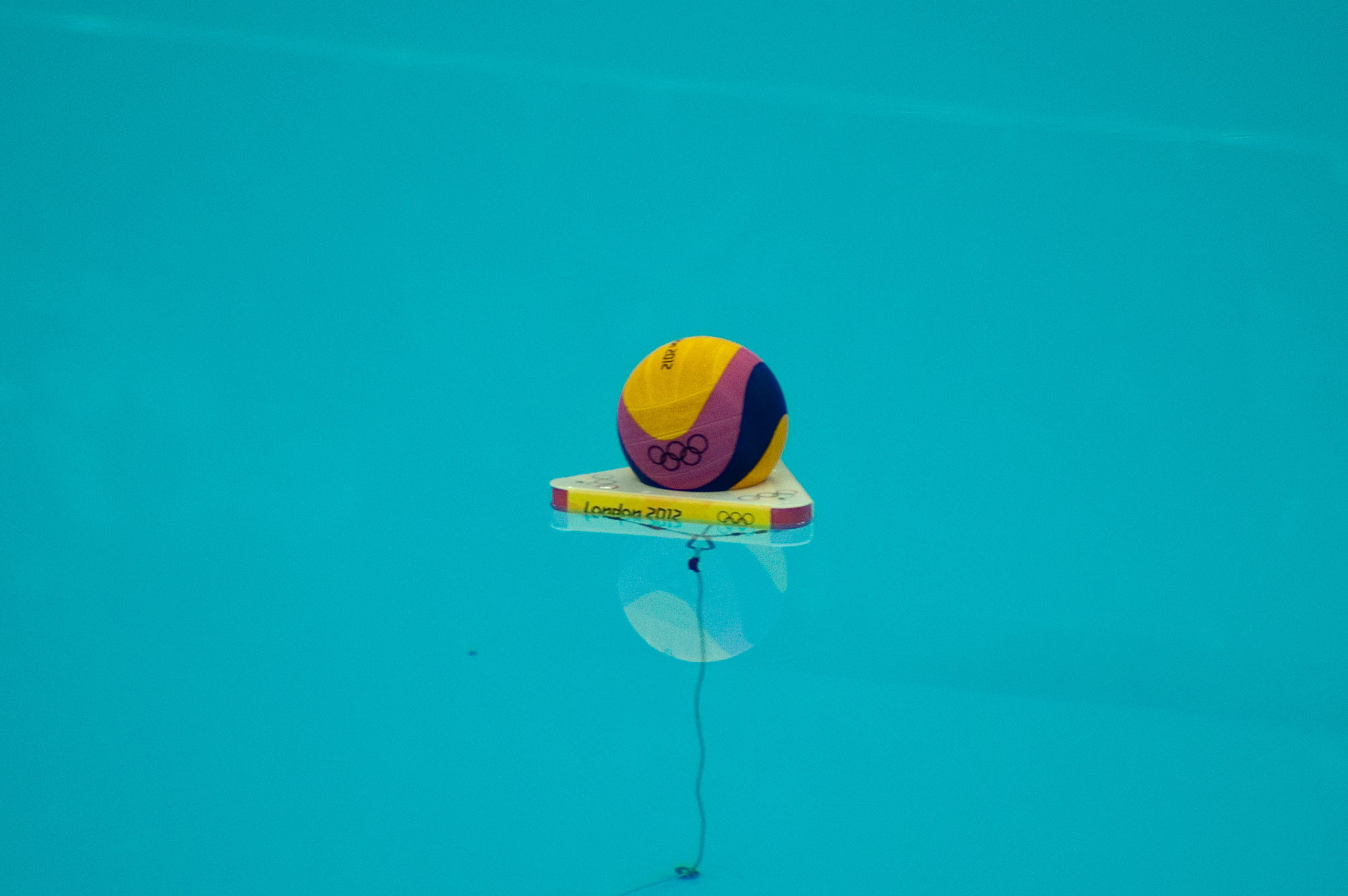
2012 Summer Olympic water polo ball

In the first half of 2005, FINA allowed a change to the standard water polo ball used in official games. This change permitted a coloured middle stripe (blue, green, red, black, or yellow) with the normal yellow stripes flanking the coloured.

In May 2006, the NCAA and National Federation of State High School Associations Rules Committees announced a rule change allowing the colored balls to be used in all NCAA and NFHS sanctioned games. The current rule states that the water polo ball must be "yellow with black lines", but new wording will allow for colored panels. Mikasa Sports, manufacturer of the new colored ball, claims that the new ball benefits teams by making it easier for them to keep track of their balls, differentiating the women's balls from the men's and teaching proper rotation on the ball.

Unique designs and color combinations have been used to commemorate special competitions.

== See also ==
- Water polo cap
