= List of United States men's national water polo team rosters =

This article contains lists of men's national water polo team rosters of the United States of America. The lists are updated as of March 30, 2020.

== Abbreviations ==
(C)	Captain	(GK)	Goalkeeper

== Olympic Games ==
Men's water polo tournaments have been staged at the Olympic Games since 1900. The United States has participated in 22 of 27 tournaments.

- (United States) 1904 St. Louis – (gold) Gold, (silver) Silver, (bronze) Bronze medals (Demonstration event)
  New York Athletic Club: David Bratton, Budd Goodwin, Louis Handley, David Hesser, Joe Ruddy, James Steen, George Van Cleaf. Head coach: Gus Sundstrom.
  Chicago Athletic Association: Rex Beach, David Hammond, Charles Healy, Frank Kehoe, Jerome Steever, Edwin Swatek, Bill Tuttle. Head coach: Alex Meffert.
  Missouri Athletic Club: Gwynne Evans, Gus Goessling, John Meyers, Bill Orthwein, Amedee Reyburn, Frank Schreiner, Manfred Toeppen.
- (Belgium) 1920 Antwerp – 4th place
  Clement Browne, James Carson, Harry Hebner (C), Sophus Jensen, Mike McDermott, Perry McGillivray, Norman Ross, Preston Steiger, Herbert Taylor, Herb Vollmer, William Vosburgh. Head coach: Otto Wahle.
- (France) 1924 Paris – (bronze) Bronze medal
  Art Austin, Elmer Collett (GK), Jam Handy, Oliver Horn, Fred Lauer (GK), George Mitchell, John Norton, Wally O'Connor, George Schroth, Herb Vollmer (C), Johnny Weissmuller. Head coach: Harry Hebner (did not go) (Note: Harry Hebner was appointed head coach for the 1924 games, but he did not go due to business commitment.) / Otto Wahle.
- (Netherlands) 1928 Amsterdam – 7th place
  John Cattus (GK), Harry Daniels (GK), Joseph Farley, Richard Greenberg, Sam Greller, George Mitchell (C), Wally O'Connor, Paul Samson, George Schroth, Herbert Topp, Johnny Weissmuller. Head coach: Perry McGillivray.
- (United States) 1932 Los Angeles – (bronze) Bronze medal
  Austin Clapp, Phil Daubenspeck, Charley Finn, Harold McCallister, Wally O'Connor (C), Cal Strong, Herb Wildman (GK). (Note: Only 7 players competed in this tournament. They were all listed in page 607, 629, 630, 631, 632 and 633 of the Official Report of the 1932 Olympic Games (page 623, 646, 647, 648, 649 and 650 of the PDF document). The official report of the International Olympic Committee did not count other reserves or alternates as competitors or medalists.) Head coach: Frank Rivas.
- (Germany) 1936 Berlin – 9th place
  Kenneth Beck, Phil Daubenspeck, Charley Finn, Dixon Fiske, Fred Lauer (GK), Harold McCallister, Wally O'Connor (C), Ray Ruddy, Herb Wildman (GK). (Note: Only 9 players competed in this tournament. They were all listed in page 984 of the Official Report of the 1936 Olympic Games (page 345 of the PDF document). The official report of the International Olympic Committee did not count other reserves or alternates as competitors.) Head coach: Clyde Swendsen.
- (United Kingdom) 1948 London – 11th place
  Kenneth Beck, Bob Bray, Ralph Budelman (GK), Lee Case, Chris Christensen, Harold Dash, Dixon Fiske, Edwin Knox (C). (Note: Only 8 players competed in this tournament. They were all listed in page 470 and 472 of the Official Report of the 1948 Olympic Games (page 642 and 644 of the PDF document). The official report of the International Olympic Committee did not count other reserves or alternates as competitors.) Head coach: Austin Clapp.
- (Finland) 1952 Helsinki – 4th place
  Harry Bisbey (GK), Marvin Burns, Bill Dornblaser, Bob Hughes, Edward Jaworski, Bill Kooistra, Norman Lake, Jim Norris (C), Jack Spargo, Peter Stange. (Note: Only 10 players competed in this tournament. They were all listed in page 599, 600, 603, 604 and 605 of the Official Report of the 1952 Olympic Games (page 602, 603, 606, 607 and 608 of the PDF document). The official report of the International Olympic Committee did not count other reserves or alternates as competitors.) Head coach: Urho Saari.
- (Australia) 1956 Melbourne – 5th place
  Bob Frojen, Jim Gaughran, Ken Hahn (GK), Robert Horn (GK), Bob Hughes, Bill Kooistra (C), Sam Kooistra, Bill Ross, Ronald Severa, Wally Wolf. (Note: Only 10 players competed in this tournament. They were all listed in page 623 and 624 of the Official Report of the 1956 Olympic Games (page 625 and 626 of the PDF document). The official report of the International Olympic Committee did not count other reserves or alternates as competitors.) Head coach: Neil Kohlhase.
- (Italy) 1960 Rome – 7th place
  Chuck Bittick, Marvin Burns, Ron Crawford, Gordie Hall (GK), Robert Horn (GK), Chick McIlroy, Ronald Severa, Fred Tisue, Ron Volmer, Wally Wolf. (Note: Only 10 players competed in this tournament. They were all listed in page 615, 616, 619, 620 and 623 of the Official Report of the 1960 Olympic Games (page 624, 625, 628, 629 and 632 of the PDF document). The official report of the International Olympic Committee did not count other reserves or alternates as competitors.) Head coach: Neil Kohlhase.
- (Japan) 1964 Tokyo – 9th place
  Tony van Dorp (GK), Ron Crawford, Dave Ashleigh, Ned McIlroy, Chick McIlroy, Stan Cole, Bob Saari, Dan Drown, Paul McIlroy, Ralph Whitney, George Stransky (GK). Head coach: Urho Saari.
- 1968 Mexico City – 5th place
  Tony van Dorp (GK), Dave Ashleigh (C), Russ Webb, Ron Crawford, Stan Cole, Bruce Bradley, Dean Willeford, Barry Weitzenberg, Gary Sheerer, John Parker, Steve Barnett (GK). Head coach: Art Lambert.
- (West Germany) 1972 Munich – (bronze) Bronze medal
  Jim Slatton (GK), Stan Cole, Russ Webb, Barry Weitzenberg, Gary Sheerer (C), Bruce Bradley, Peter Asch, Jim Ferguson, Steve Barnett (GK), John Parker, Eric Lindroth. Head coach: Monte Nitzkowski.
- (Canada) 1976 Montreal – Did not qualify
- (Soviet Union) 1980 Moscow – Qualified but withdrew
  Chris Dorst (GK), Gary Figueroa, Steve Hamann (GK), Eric Lindroth, Drew McDonald, Kevin Robertson, Peter Schnugg, Terry Schroeder, John Siman, Jon Svendsen, Joe Vargas. Head coach: Monte Nitzkowski.
- (United States) 1984 Los Angeles – (silver) Silver medal
  Craig Wilson (GK), Kevin Robertson, Gary Figueroa, Peter Campbell, Doug Burke, Joe Vargas, Jon Svendsen, John Siman, Drew McDonald, Terry Schroeder (C), Jody Campbell, Tim Shaw, Chris Dorst (GK). Head coach: Monte Nitzkowski.
- (South Korea) 1988 Seoul – (silver) Silver medal
  Craig Wilson (GK), Kevin Robertson, James Bergeson, Peter Campbell, Doug Kimbell, Craig Klass, Alan Mouchawar, Jeff Campbell, Greg Boyer, Terry Schroeder (C), Jody Campbell, Chris Duplanty (GK), Mike Evans. Head coach: Bill Barnett.
- (Spain) 1992 Barcelona – 4th place
  Craig Wilson (GK), John Vargas, Chris Duplanty (GK), Mike Evans, Doug Kimbell, Charlie Harris, Kirk Everist, Jeff Campbell, Chris Humbert, Terry Schroeder (C), Craig Klass, Erich Fischer, Alex Rousseau. Head coach: Bill Barnett.
- (United States) 1996 Atlanta – 7th place
  Chris Duplanty (Captain, GK), Dan Hackett (GK), Jeremy Laster, Kyle Kopp, Chris Oeding, Gavin Arroyo, Alex Rousseau, Rick McNair, Kirk Everist, Chris Humbert, Mike Evans, Troy Barnhart, Jr., Wolf Wigo. Head coach: Richard Corso.
- (Australia) 2000 Sydney – 6th place
  Dan Hackett (GK), Chi Kredell, Robert Lynn, Kyle Kopp, Chris Oeding (C), Gavin Arroyo, Brad Schumacher, Tony Azevedo, Wolf Wigo, Chris Humbert, Sean Kern, Sean Nolan (GK), Ryan Bailey. Head coach: John Vargas.
- (Greece) 2004 Athens – 7th place
  Brandon Brooks (GK), Wolf Wigo (C), Omar Amr, Jeff Powers, Adam Wright, Chris Segesman, Layne Beaubien, Tony Azevedo, Dan Klatt, Brett Ormsby, Jesse Smith, Genai Kerr (GK), Ryan Bailey. Head coach: Ratko Rudić.
- (China) 2008 Beijing – (silver) Silver medal
  Merrill Moses (GK), Peter Varellas, Peter Hudnut, Jeff Powers, Adam Wright, Rick Merlo, Layne Beaubien, Tony Azevedo (C), Ryan Bailey, Tim Hutten, Jesse Smith, J. W. Krumpholz, Brandon Brooks (GK). Head coach: Terry Schroeder.
- (United Kingdom) 2012 London – 8th place
  Merrill Moses (GK), Peter Varellas, Peter Hudnut, Jeff Powers, Adam Wright, Shea Buckner, Layne Beaubien, Tony Azevedo (C), Ryan Bailey, Tim Hutten, Jesse Smith, John Mann, Chay Lapin (GK). Head coach: Terry Schroeder.
- (Brazil) 2016 Rio de Janeiro – 10th place
  Merrill Moses (GK), Thomas Dunstan, Ben Hallock, Alex Obert, Alex Roelse, Luca Cupido, Josh Samuels, Tony Azevedo (C), Alex Bowen, Bret Bonanni, Jesse Smith, John Mann, McQuin Baron (GK). Head coach: Dejan Udovičić.

== World Aquatics Championships ==
Men's water polo tournaments have been staged at the World Aquatics Championships since 1973. The United States has participated in 18 of 18 tournaments.

- (Canada) 2005 Montreal – 11th place
  Brandon Brooks (GK), Ryan Bailey, J. W. Krumpholz, Jeff Powers, Adam Wright, Peter Hudnut, Rick Merlo, Tony Azevedo (C), Spencer Dornin, Brian Alexander, Jesse Smith, Nathaniel Bennett (GK), Shea Buckner. Head coach: Guy Baker.
- (Australia) 2007 Melbourne – 9th place
  Merrill Moses (GK), Peter Varellas, Dreason Barry, Jeff Powers, Adam Wright, Kevin Witt, Ryan Bailey, Tony Azevedo (C), Rick Merlo, Layne Beaubien, Jesse Smith, Brian Alexander, Genai Kerr (GK). Head coach: Ricardo Azevedo.
- (Italy) 2009 Rome – 4th place
  Merrill Moses (GK), Peter Varellas, Brian Alexander, Jeff Powers, Adam Wright, Justin Johnson, Layne Beaubien, Tony Azevedo (C), Ryan Bailey, Tim Hutten, Jesse Smith, J. W. Krumpholz, Genai Kerr (GK). Head coach: Terry Schroeder.
- (China) 2011 Shanghai – 6th place
  Merrill Moses (GK), Peter Varellas, Peter Hudnut, Jeff Powers, Adam Wright, Brian Alexander, Layne Beaubien, Tony Azevedo (C), Ryan Bailey, Tim Hutten, Jesse Smith, Shea Buckner, Andy Stevens (GK). Head coach: Terry Schroeder.
- (Spain) 2013 Barcelona – 9th place
  Merrill Moses (GK), Janson Wigo, Alex Obert, Alex Bowen, Matthew de Trane, Chancellor Ramirez, J. W. Krumpholz, Tony Azevedo (C), Shea Buckner, Tim Hutten, Michael Rosenthal, John Mann, Andy Stevens (GK). Head coach: Dejan Udovičić.
- (Russia) 2015 Kazan – 7th place
  Merrill Moses (GK), Nikola Vavić, Alex Obert, Jackson Kimbell, Alex Roelse, Luca Cupido, Josh Samuels, Tony Azevedo (C), Alex Bowen, Bret Bonanni, Jesse Smith, John Mann, McQuin Baron (GK). Head coach: Dejan Udovičić.
- (Hungary) 2017 Budapest – 13th place
  McQuin Baron (GK), Johnny Hooper, Marko Vavic, Alex Obert (C), Ben Hallock, Luca Cupido, Thomas Dunstan, Nic Carniglia, Alex Bowen, Chancellor Ramirez, Alex Roelse, Max Irving, Drew Holland (GK). Head coach: Dejan Udovičić.
- (South Korea) 2019 Gwangju – 9th place
  Alex Wolf (GK), Johnny Hooper, Marko Vavic, Alex Obert, Ben Hallock, Luca Cupido, Hannes Daube, Matthew Farmer, Alex Bowen, Chancellor Ramirez, Jesse Smith (C), Max Irving, Drew Holland (GK). Head coach: Dejan Udovičić.

== FINA World Cup ==
The FINA Men's Water Polo World Cup was established in 1979. The United States has participated in 15 of 16 tournaments.

- (Spain) 1991 Barcelona – (gold) Gold medal
  Jeff Campbell, Mike Evans, Erich Fischer, Charlie Harris, Chris Humbert, David Imbernino, Doug Kimbell, Craig Klass, Robert Lynn, Kames Makshanoff (GK), Terry Schroeder (C), John Vargas, Craig Wilson (GK). Head coach: Bill Barnett.
- (Greece) 1997 Athens – (gold) Gold medal
  Gavin Arroyo, Ryan Bailey, Chris Duplanty (GK), Dan Hackett (GK), Chris Humbert, Kyle Kopp, Chi Kredel, Jeremy Laster, Drew Netherton, Chris Oeding, Brad Schumacher, Peter Stern, Wolf Wigo. Head coach: John Vargas.
- (Romania) 2010 Oradea – 4th place
  Merrill Moses (GK), Peter Varellas, Mike Sharf, Jeff Powers, Adam Wright, Jeff Tyrell, Thomas Hopkins, Tony Azevedo (C), Ryan Bailey, Tim Hutten, Jesse Smith, Tommy Corcoran, Andy Stevens (GK). Head coach: Terry Schroeder.
- (Kazakhstan) 2014 Almaty – 4th place
  McQuin Baron (GK), Conner Cleary, Nolan McConnell, Alex Obert, Alex Bowen, Bret Bonanni, Josh Samuels, Michael Rosenthal, John Mann, Luca Cupido, Jesse Smith, Ryder Roberts, Merrill Moses (GK). Head coach: Dejan Udovičić.
- (Germany) 2018 Berlin – 6th place
  McQuin Baron (GK), Johnny Hooper, Dylan Woodhead, Alex Obert, Ben Hallock, Luca Cupido, Nic Carniglia, Alex Roelse, Alex Bowen, Ben Stevenson, Jesse Smith (C), Max Irving, Jack Turner (GK). Head coach: Dejan Udovičić.

== Pan American Games ==
Men's water polo tournaments have been staged at the Pan American Games since 1951. The United States has participated in 18 of 18 tournaments.

- 1975 Mexico City – (silver) Silver medal
  Guy Antley (GK), Peter Asch, Paul Becsahazy, Thomas Belfonti, Jim Ferguson, Steve Hamann (GK), Jim Kruse, Eric Lindroth, Mike Loughlin, Peter Schnugg, Jon Svendsen. Head coach: Pete Cutino.
- (Brazil) 2007 Rio de Janeiro – (gold) Gold medal
  Merrill Moses (GK), Peter Varellas, Peter Hudnut, Jeff Powers, Adam Wright, Kevin Witt, Ryan Bailey, Tony Azevedo (C), Thomas Hopkins, Layne Beaubien, Jesse Smith, John Mann, Genai Kerr (GK). Head coach: Terry Schroeder.
- (Mexico) 2011 Guadalajara – (gold) Gold medal
  Merrill Moses (GK), Peter Varellas, Peter Hudnut, Jeff Powers, Adam Wright, Brian Alexander, Layne Beaubien, Tony Azevedo (C), Ryan Bailey, Tim Hutten, Jesse Smith, J. W. Krumpholz, Chay Lapin (GK). Head coach: Terry Schroeder.
- (Canada) 2015 Toronto – (gold) Gold medal
  Merrill Moses (GK), Nikola Vavić, Alex Obert, Jackson Kimbell, Alex Roelse, Luca Cupido, Josh Samuels, Tony Azevedo (C), Alex Bowen, Bret Bonanni, Jesse Smith, John Mann, McQuin Baron (GK). Head coach: Dejan Udovičić.
- (Peru) 2019 Lima – (gold) Gold medal
  Alex Wolf (GK), Johnny Hooper, Marko Vavic, Alex Obert, Ben Hallock, Luca Cupido, Hannes Daube, Max Irving, Alex Bowen, Chancellor Ramirez, Jesse Smith (C). Head coach: Dejan Udovičić.

== See also ==
- List of United States men's Olympic water polo team rosters
- United States men's national water polo team
- United States women's national water polo team
- List of United States women's national water polo team rosters
