= Bret Bonanni =

American water polo player (born 1994)

Personal information
- Born: 20 January 1994 (age 32) Newport Beach, California
- Height: 193 cm (6 ft 4 in)
- Weight: 93 kg (205 lb)

Sport
- Sport: Water polo
- Position: Driver (Stanford WP)
- College team: Stanford University
- Club: New York Athletic Club
- Coached by: Chris Segesman (Mater Dei High); John Vargas (Stanford)
Medal record
Representing United States
Pan American Games
Gold medal – first place	2015 Toronto	team

Bret Bonanni (born 20 January 1994) is a water polo player from the United States. He was part of the American team at the 2016 US Men's Water Polo team, at the 2016 Summer Olympics in Rio de Janeiro that finished in tenth place.

== Early life ==
Bonanni was born January 20, 1994 in Newport Beach, California to father Ed Bonanni and mother Kim. Graduating in 2012, he attended Mater Dei High School, where he was coached by 2004 Athens water polo Olympian Chris Segesman, Bonanni earned Varsity letters in water polo all four years of his attendance. He captained the team in his last two years, and was instrumental in leading Mater Dei to four California Interscholastic Federation titles. During his years of participation with the Mater Dei, the water polo team in 2008-9 won CIF Division II Southern Section titles, and in 2008-9 and in 201-22 won Southern Section Division I titles. Recognized for his water polo play in High School, Bonanni won honors as part of the 2010 and 2011 NISCA/Speedo All-America Boy's First Team. In 2010 and 2011, he was a CIF Southern Section Division I Player of the Year.

== Stanford University ==
Bonanni attended Stanford University from around 2012-2016, majoring in Science, Technology, and Society. While playing water polo at Stanford for Head Coach John Vargas, a USA Water Polo Hall of Fame inductee, and US Olympic Coach, Bonanni was a finalist for the 2015 Peter J. Cutino award, presented each year to the top collegiate water polo player.

As a Freshman at Stanford in 2012, he was the season team high scorer with 73 goals, had 213 goals in 2013 as a Sophomore, and as a Junior in 2014 scored 96 goals to lead the Mountain Pacific conference. In 2014, as a Junior, he was an American Collegiate Water Polo Coaches All American, First Team, and an All-Mountain Pacific Sports Federation First team honoree.

== International competition ==
In a competition highlight, he was part of the US National team that won a gold medal at the 2015 Pan American Games in Toronto, Canada. In other international competition, he received honors at Almaty Kazakhstah's FINA World Cup in August 2014, becoming part of the All-Tournament Team where he was instrumental in leading the U.S. to a fourth-place. He was credited with 13 total goals, including five including five in a game against Serbia. He played with the US Senior National team that placed fourth at Russia's FINA World League's Super Final in June 2013. He had earlier played with the US Jr. National team at the Volos, Greece, Junior World Championships in 2011.

== 2016 Rio Olympics ==
Bonanni participated with the men's Olympic water polo tournament at the 2016 Summer Olympics in Rio de Janeiro, where the U.S. team finished 10th overall, under U.S. Head Olympic Coach Dejan Udovičić, with Serbia taking the Gold, Croatia the silver, and Italy taking the bronze medal. In their second game, they lost to Spain 10-9, and lost its first game against Croatia 7-5. Bonanni scored four goals in the close loss to Spain. Team Captain Tony Avezedo had also played at Stanford as had Bonanni.
