= Peter Varellas =

American water polo player (born 1984)

Personal information
- Full name: Peter Dale Varellas
- Born: October 2, 1984 (age 41) Moraga, California
- Occupations: Water Polo Professional; Olympic Committee Liaison
- Height: 191 cm (6 ft 3 in)
- Weight: 89 kg (196 lb)

Sport
- Position: Attacker (WP)
- College team: Stanford University
- Club: Olympic Club (Post Stanford); San Francisco, CA; Rari Nantes Savona (Italy, Pro)
- Coached by: John Vargas (Stanford); Terry Schroeder (08 Olympics)
Medal record
Men's water polo
Representing the United States
Olympic Games
Silver medal – second place	2008 Beijing	Team
Pan American Games
Gold medal – first place	2011 Guadalajara	Team

Peter Varellas (born October 2, 1984) was an American water polo player who competed for Stanford University and participated in the 2008 Summer Olympics in Beijing, where the U.S. men's water polo team won a silver team medal losing to the team from Hungary in the final game, but winning their first medal since 1988. He later participated in water polo at the 2012 Summer Olympics in London, where the U.S. team placed eighth overall.

== Early life ==
Varellas was born October 2, 1984 to Larry and Robyn Varellas in Moraga, California, and grew up in the East Bay area, where he swam and played water polo for Moraga's Campolindo High School, graduating in 2002. Representing Campolindo High in swimming in mid-May, 2002 as a multi-stroke swimmer, Varellas placed second in the 200 IM with a 1:55, and first in the 100 breaststroke with a 57.37 at the North Coast Section Trials at the Delores Bengston Center in Pleasanton, California, advancing to the Section finals. Having graduated Campolindo in August, 2002, Varellas briefly played for the Lamorinda Boy's Water Polo team, which won the bronze medal at the USA Water Polo National Junior Olympics with a win over the team from Chino Hills.

== Stanford University ==
Varellas attended and played water polo at Stanford University from 2002-2005, primarily under Head Coach John Vargas, where teammates included Olympians Peter Hudnut and Tony Azevedo. In all four of his Stanford seasons, Varellas was instrumental in bringing the Cardinals to the NCAA Championship game, with the Stanford winning the title in 2002. During his time playing for Stanford, Varellas scored a total of 168 goals, and was credited with 62, his season high, in 2005. The American Water Polo Coaches Association twice named him an All-American, making second team in 2004 and as a Senior in 2005, he made first team. A graduate of Stanford in 2006, Varellas majored in Management Science & Engineering. In his Senior year, he received Stanford's Most Outstanding Male Senior Award and was a Pacific Coast Conference (Pac-10) Male Athlete of the Year for Stanford. He received the honor of being selected for an NCAA Postgraduate Scholarship. As a strong left-handed player, Varellas was listed as playing water polo as an Attacker, who scored from the perimeter and likely often played in the driver position lining up near the ends of the goal. After the 2012 Olympics, Varellas attended the Stanford Graduate School of Business, receiving an MBA in 2014.

== International competition highlights ==
After completing Stanford as an undergraduate, Varellas began playing with the U.S. National water polo team in 2006. Playing with the U.S. National team, Varellas earned a team gold medal at the Pan American games in Rio de Janeiro in 2007, and another gold in the Pan American games in Guadalajara in 2011. In 2007 and 2009, Varellas also played on the U.S. team at the FINA World Championship.

== Olympics ==
=== 2008 Beijing silver medal ===
Varellas participated in the 2008 Summer Olympics in Beijing, under Head Olympic Coach Terry Schroeder, where the U.S. team won a silver team medal, earning their first appearance on the podium as an Olympic medal winner since the 1988 Olympics. An important contributor to the team, Varellas scored five goals and was credited with seven assists in Olympic play. Pre-Olympic favorites Hungary took the gold medal and Serbia took the bronze. At the Beijing water polo semi-finals, Hungary beat Montenegro 11-9, and the U.S. team, in the other semi-final, had an unexpected victory over the strong men's team from Serbia, with a score of 10-5. For the first three quarters in the final gold and silver medal match between Hungary and the U.S. team, both teams stayed close, though Hungary held a 9-8 halftime lead. Scoring in the opening of the third quarter, the U.S. team tied the score at 9-9, but Hungary surged ahead with five unanswered goals, winning the gold medal by a score of 14-10, despite the U.S. team making one last goal.

=== 2012 London Olympics ===
Four years later, Varellas participated with the Olympic Water Polo team in the 2012 Olympics in London, where the U.S. team placed eighth overall. Croatia took the gold, Italy took the silver, and Serbia took the bronze medal.

=== Professional pursuits ===
In professional competition, from 2006-2010, Varellas competed for the Italian team Rari Nantes Savona, where he led the team to second place finishes in the LEN Cup and the Italian League in 2009-10.

Staying active in the water polo community, Varellas has served for the USA Water Polo Board of Directors as an athlete representative. He has been a Volunteer Assistant Coach for Stanford's men water polo.

== See also ==
- List of Olympic medalists in water polo (men)
