= 2006 NCAA Men's Water Polo Championship =

Water polo tournament season

Tournament details
- Dates: December 2–3, 2006
- Teams: 4

Final positions
- Champions: California (12th title)
- Runners-up: USC (10th title game)

Tournament statistics
- Matches played: 4
- Goals scored: 80 (20 per match)
- Attendance: 4,552 (1,138 per match)
- Top goal scorer(s): Juan Delgadillo, USC (6)

Awards
- Best player: Mark Sheredy, California

The 2006 NCAA Men's Water Polo Championship was the 38th annual NCAA Men's Water Polo Championship to determine the national champion of NCAA men's collegiate water polo. Tournament matches were played at the Burns Aquatics Center at Loyola Marymount University in Los Angeles, California from December 2–3, 2006.

California defeated USC in the final, 7–6, to win their twelfth national title. The Golden Bears (31–4) were coached by Kirk Everist.

The Most Outstanding Player of the tournament was Mark Sheredy from California. Additionally, two All-Tournament Teams were named: a First Team (with seven players including Sheredy) and a Second Team (with eight players).

The tournament's leading scorer, with 6 goals, was Juan Delgadillo from USC.

== Qualification ==
Since there has only ever been one single national championship for water polo, all NCAA men's water polo programs (whether from Division I, Division II, or Division III) were eligible. A total of 4 teams were invited to contest this championship.

Team	Appearance	Previous
California	24th	2002
UC San Diego	10th	2002
Navy	12th	2003
USC	21st	2004

== Bracket ==
- Site: Burns Aquatics Center, Los Angeles, California

Semifinals
1	USC	20
4	Navy	3
2	California	17
3	UC San Diego	7

Championship
1	USC	6
2	California	7
Third Place
4	Navy	8
3	UC San Diego	12

== All-tournament teams ==
=== First Team ===
- Mark Sheredy, California (Most outstanding player)
- Tommy Corcoran, USC
- Juan Delgadillo, USC
- Thomas Hale, USC
- Brian Kinsel, California
- John Mann, California
- Andrija Vasiljevic, California

=== Second Team ===
- Brian Bacharach, California
- Jesse Cassellini, UC San Diego
- Ty Lacky, UC San Diego
- Marty Matthies, California
- Aaron Recko, Navy
- Adam Shilling, USC
- Pavol Valovic, USC

== See also ==
- NCAA Men's Water Polo Championship
- NCAA Women's Water Polo Championship
