= 1998 NCAA Men's Water Polo Championship =

Water polo tournament season

Tournament details
- Dates: December 1998
- Teams: 4

Final positions
- Champions: USC (1st title)
- Runners-up: Stanford (13th title game)

Tournament statistics
- Matches played: 4
- Goals scored: 60 (15 per match)
- Attendance: 3,132 (783 per match)
- Top goal scorer(s): George Csaszar, USC (5)

Awards
- Best player: Chris Aguilera, Stanford; Ivan Babic, USC; Marko Pintaric, USC

The 1998 NCAA Men's Water Polo Championship was the 30th annual NCAA Men's Water Polo Championship to determine the national champion of NCAA men's collegiate water polo. Tournament matches were played at the Marian Bergeson Aquatic Center in Newport Beach, California during December 1998.

USC defeated Stanford in the final, 9–8 (in two overtimes), to win their first national title. The Trojans had previously gone 0–6 in tournament finals appearances. The Trojans (25–3) were coached by John Williams and Jovan Vavic.

The Most Outstanding Players of the tournament were Chris Aguilera (Stanford), Ivan Babic (USC), and Marko Pintaric (USC). These three, along with five other players, comprised the All-Tournament Team.

The tournament's leading scorer, with 5 goals, was George Csaszar from USC.

== Qualification ==
Since there has only ever been one single national championship for water polo, all NCAA men's water polo programs (whether from Division I, Division II, or Division III) were eligible. A total of 4 teams were invited to contest this championship.

Team	Appearance	Previous
Stanford	22nd	1994
UC San Diego	6th	1995
Massachusetts	5th	1996
USC	17th	1997

== Bracket ==
- Site: Marian Bergeson Aquatic Center, Newport Beach, California

Semifinals
USC	12
Massachusetts	3
Stanford	6
UC San Diego	3

Championship
USC (2OT)	9
Stanford	8
Third Place
Massachusetts	9
UC San Diego (4OT)	10

== All-tournament team ==
- Chris Aguilera, Stanford (Most outstanding player)
- Ivan Babic, USC (Most outstanding player)
- Layne Beaubien, Stanford
- James Castle, USC
- George Csaszar, USC
- Brian Heifferon, Stanford
- Ross Mecham, UC San Diego
- Marko Pintaric, USC (Most outstanding player)

== See also ==
- NCAA Men's Water Polo Championship
