= Craig Kredell =

American water polo player (born 1971)

Personal information
- Nickname: "Chi"
- Born: February 16, 1971 (age 55) Long Beach, California, United States
- Height: 187 cm (6 ft 2 in)
- Weight: 88 kg (194 lb)

Sport
- Sport: Water polo
- Position: Utility (Long Beach State WP); 2-meter "center" defense (US team)
- College team: Long Beach State
- Coached by: Rick Jones (Long Beach Wilson High); Ken Lindgren (Long Beach State); John Vargas (Olympics)
Medal record
Representing United States
Pan American Games
Gold medal – first place	1995 Mar del Plata	Team competition

Craig "Chi" Kredell (born February 16, 1971) is a former American water polo player who competed for Long Beach State University . He competed in the men's tournament at the 2000 Sydney Olympics where the US team placed sixth overall. After his water polo career, he served as a manager for Long Beach Shore Aquatics.

== Early life ==
Kredell was born February 16, 1971 in Long Beach, California to father Ron Kredell and Nancy. Closely tied to the community, Kredell's father Ronald served as a Seal Beach City Counselman in 1976. Craig took his nickname "Chi" from his father Ron who was originally from Chicago, and had the nickname as a young man. Craig attended and played water polo for the highly recognized program at Long Beach Wilson High School, under the strong training and coaching of Rick Jones. Jones had a thirty-year career at Wilson where he began coaching water polo in 1978, winning league titles in every year but one, while serving as a Vice-President of US Water Polo from 1984 to 1990. Robert Lynn was a strong player at Wilson, shortly before Kredell's tenure with the team, who later played in the 2000 Olympics with Kredell. In a 1988 4A Semi-final match for the Southern Section 4A Water Polo title, Kredell scored 3 goals, but the team last to the strong program at Corona del Mar High School, coached by John Vargas, a future US Olympic water polo team coach.

== Long Beach State University ==
Kredell attended Long Beach State (LBS) from around 1989-1993, where he played water polo for the strong program at LBS under coach Ken Lindgren, a former player for Long Beach State and a Water Polo Hall of Fame inductee. At Long Beach State, Kredell won varsity letters in four years from 1989 to 1991 and in 1993. Kredell made first team All-Mountain Pacific Sports Federation (MPSF) Conference honors in 1993, and was an All-MPSF Conference second team honoree in 1991. He completed his collegiate water polo career as the sixth highest career scorer for Long Beach State with 143 goals. He scored a total of 55 points for the water polo team in his Senior year in 1993, which as of 1998 was the eighth most goals ever scored at Long Beach State for one season. He received All-American third team honors in his Senior collegiate year. During college, Kredell was described as a utility player, allowing his coach to assign him to any field position which excludes goaltender.

In June 1995, at the Fort Lauderdale International Swimming Hall of Fame, Kredell played for the US National water polo team under Coach Rich Corso in a close 10–9 loss against Russia, though he scored three goals in regulation play.

== 1996 Atlanta Olympic trials ==
In 1996, Kredell was one of the last players to be cut from the US 1996 Atlanta Olympic Water Polo team, and though he was given the opportunity to travel to Atlanta with the team, he decided not to as he believed it would be hard to sit by while the US team played. John Vargas, the 1996 Olympic Coach, considered Kredell one of the world's most outstanding players on defense at the time. Prior to the 1996 Olympic selection process, Kredell spent a year playing club water polo in Greece, where he gained strength, and improved his fundamental and ball handling skills.

Playing for the New York Athletic Club at the Senior Nationals Water Polo Tournament in Los Alamitos, California, in July, 2000, Kredell scored the goal that put his team ahead with 1:05 remaining in regulation play to defeat the Newport Water Polo Club 9-7, taking third place in the tournament.

In their first preliminary game playing with the US National team, Kredell scored a goal in a 7–7 tie with Australia at the UPS International Cup in late June, 2000 at the Los Alamitos Armed Forces Reserve Center. Yugoslavia later won the Cup.

== 2000 Sydney Olympics ==
Craig participated in the men's water polo tournament at the September, 2000 Sydney Olympics under Olympic Coach John Vargas. He was part of the US team that completed the Olympic tournament with an overall sixth-place finish among twelve competing countries. In preliminary rounds, the US team defeated the Netherlands and Croatia, both traditionally strong teams, but lost their last match in the final round 10–8 to Italy. Perennial pre-game favorite Hungary took the gold medal, Russia took the silver, and the historically dominant team from Yugoslavia took the bronze, having had more total goals than the United States. Hungary easily defeated rival Russia in the final game by a score of 13-6, leading in each of the first three periods by a score of 3-1, 8-2, and 10-4 respectively. With the US National team, Kredell often played the 2-meter defender, a center position who protected the goal at least two meters away from the goal line.

=== International competition ===
In international competition, Kredell was part of the US team that won water polo gold medals at the 1995 Pan American Games in Mara del Plata, Argentina and the 1999 Pan American Games in Winnipeg, Ontario, Canada. He competed at the World Championships in 1994 in Rome, Italy, where the US team placed sixth and in the 1998 World Championships where the US team placed seventh in Perth, Australia. He was also part of the US team that competed at the Goodwill Games in 1994.

=== Honors ===
Kredell is a member of the Long Beach Wilson High School Athletic Hall of Fame and became a member of the Long Beach State University Athletic Hall of Fame in 1988.

== Careers ==
Remaining active in aquatics, after retiring from elite water polo competition, he served as a Director for Long Beach Shore Aquatics, continuing to contribute to the aquatic community in his native Long Beach. Kredell has served as a Chief Executive officer of the organization and his relative Kristine Kredell has served as Secretary.
