= Thomas Dunstan (water polo) =

American water polo player (born 1997)

Personal information
- Born: September 29, 1997 (age 29) Norwalk, Connecticut, United States
- Height: 194 cm (6 ft 4 in)
- Weight: 96 kg (212 lb)

Sport
- Sport: Water polo
- Position: Driver (water polo)
- College team: University Southern California (USC)
- Club: YMCA of Greenwich Aquatics; Regency Water Polo
- Coached by: Chris Segesman (Mater Dei High); Jovan Vavic (USC); Dejan Udovičić (2016 Olympics)

Thomas Dunstan (born September 29, 1997) is an American water polo player who competed for the University of Southern California. He was a member of the United States men's national water polo team at the 2016 Rio de Janeiro Olympics that placed tenth.

== Early life ==
Dunstan was born September 29, 1997 in Norwalk, Connecticut, to Tom and Amy Dunstan and grew up in New Canaan. Part of a family of four siblings, his sister Taylor played Princeton Water polo. Dunstan initially attended Connecticut's New Canaan High School which lacked a water polo team. After a transfer and a family move to California, he enrolled at Mater Dei High School for his Senior year, where in 2015, he helped lead their strong water polo team to the California Interscholastic Federation (CIF) Southern Section title. Mater Dei was coached by former US water polo Olympian and USA Water Polo Hall of Fame inductee Chris Segesman. Dunstan, who graduated Mater Dei High in the Spring of 2016, played club water polo for Greenwich Aquatics and the Regency Water Polo Club. A strong team, the YMCA of Greenwich Aquatics Water Polo Club qualified for the USA Turbo Cup competition in 2012. While playing for the YMCA of Greenwich Aquatic Water Polo Team under Coach Ulmis Iordasche, Dunstan and several other Greenwich Aquatic players were chosen to be part of the USA National Junior Water Polo Training team in 2012, and Dunstan was named a Most Valuable Player by USA National Water Polo.

== 2016 Rio de Janeiro Olympics ==
After graduating High School, at 18 Dunstan participated with the men's Olympic water polo tournament at the 2016 Summer Olympics in Rio de Janeiro, where the U.S. team finished 10th overall, under U.S. Head Olympic Coach Dejan Udovičić, with Serbia taking the Gold, Croatia the silver, and Italy taking the bronze medal. In their second match, the US team had a disappointing loss to Spain by a close score of 10-9, and lost their first game against Croatia 7-5. The team was led by Captain Tony Avezedo, the US team's high scorer. After leaving USC, Dunstan played professional water polo for Greece in the A1 League, and Spain's División de Honor. He graduated USC, and though he stayed active in Water Polo, he was not selected for the 2020 team.

=== University of Southern California ===
Dunstan attended and played water polo for the University of Southern California where he was coached by Jovan Vavic from 2016 through 2017. Playing primarily as a Driver at USC, Dunstan scored 20 goals in his Sophomore year, and 25 as a Freshman.

In international competition, Dunstan was part of the US National team that placed second at the FINA's World League Super Final in 2016. He had earlier helped lead the American Youth Team to secure a gold medal at the UANA Junior Pan American Championship in 2014. At the 2014 FINA Intercontinental Tournament, he was credited with two goals to help lead the US team to a gold medal. He participated with the US National team at the FINA World Championships in 2017. Continuing to play water polo well after the 2016 Olympics, USA Men's National team selected Dunstan as an alternate for the 2022 FINA World Championship.
