= Luca Cupido =

American water polo player (born 1995)

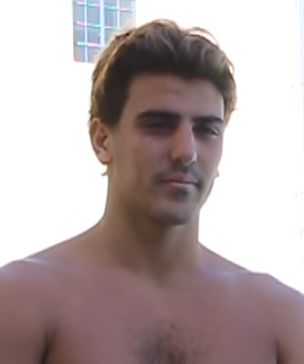
- Cupido in 2017

Personal information
- Nationality: Italian-born American
- Born: November 9, 1995 (age 30) Santa Margherita Ligure, Italy
- Height: 6 ft 4 in (1.93 m)
- Weight: 209 lb (95 kg)

Sport
- Sport: Water polo
- College team: University California Berkeley
- Club: Newport Beach Water Polo Club
- Coached by: Robert Lynn (Newport Harbor High); Kirk Everist (UC Berkeley); Dejan Udovičić (Olympics)
Medal record
Men's water polo
Representing the United States
Olympic Games
Bronze medal – third place	2024 Paris	Team
World Cup
Bronze medal – third place	2023 Los Angeles	Team
Pan American Games
Gold medal – first place	2015 Toronto	Team
Gold medal – first place	2019 Lima	Team
Gold medal – first place	2023 Santiago	Team

Luca Cupido (/ˈluːkə kuːˈpiːdoʊ/ LOO-kə koo-PEE-doh; born November 9, 1995) is an Italian-born American water polo player who was a four-time All American at the University of California, Berkeley, winning the Peter J. Cutino Award as the top collegiate player of the year in 2018. He was part of the American water polo team at the 2016 Summer Olympics, that finished in tenth place. He was later part of the US water polo team at the 2020 Tokyo Olympics that finished in sixth place, and the US water polo team at the 2024 Paris Olympics, that finished in third place, winning a bronze medal, the first since 2008.

== Early life ==
Cupido was born November 9, 1995 in Genoa, Genova, Italy and grew up in the suburb of Santa Margherita Ligure. He was part of the youth program at Rari Nantes Camogli, in Camogli, Liguria, Italy. Cupido played with youth national teams in Italy, capturing titles at both the U18 and U20 age group World Championships, and the U19 European Championship. He later attended Newport Harbor High School in Newport Beach, California, where he made All American first team honors with their strong water polo program in 2013 and was coached by Robert Lynn, a 2000 Water Polo Olympian. In club play, he competed for the Newport Beach Water Polo Club.

== Pan American games ==
Cupido captured a gold medal with the U.S. National team at the Pan American Games in 2015 in Toronto, Ontario, Canada. He was one of the US National team's highest scorers that year. He won additional gold medals in the Pan American games with one in 2019 in Lima, Peru, and one in 2023 in Santiago, Chile.

== UC Berkeley ==
Peter J. Cutino Trophy

Cupido attended the University of California Berkeley where he competed in water polo under Head Coach Kirk Everist. With an exceptional career at Berkeley, he was a 2018 Peter J. Cutino Award winner, an honor given only to the most outstanding American collegiate water polo player of the year. Cupido was an All American in four years, and was a Mountain Pacific Sports Federation Newcomer of the Year in 2014 as a Freshman, where he scored a total of 42 goals. In 2017, he was a Mountain Pacific Conference leading scorer credited with a total of 58 goals, and was a National Player of the Year. In one of his most outstanding seasons in 2017, he played nearly every field position, and was credited with 46 assists, 48 season steals, and had 19 field blocks.

In a collegiate highlight in 2016, he helped lead U. California Berkeley to the NCAA National title, and was credited with 30 goals during their championship year. In the 2016 national championship game against the University of Southern California in 2016, Cupido scored a point in the first overtime to help lead UC Berkeley to win by a score of 11-8.

== 2016 Rio Olympics ==
Cupido participated in the Olympic water polo tournament at the 2016 Summer Olympics in Rio de Janeiro where the U.S. team finished 10th overall, under U.S. Head Olympic Coach Dejan Udovičić, a former Serbian Head Coach. Serbia and Croatia were pre-game favorites. By the end of the tournament, Serbia took the Gold, Croatia the silver, and Italy the bronze medal. In close, well-played matches, in their second game, the U.S. team lost to Spain 10-9, and lost their first game against Croatia 7-5.

== 2020 Tokyo Olympics ==
In 2021, Cupido was nominated for his second Olympics with Team USA for the 2020 Tokyo Olympics. Once again playing for U.S. Head Coach Dejan Udovičić, the United States team finished sixth with Serbia taking the gold medal, Greece taking the silver, and Hungary taking the gold.

== 2024 Paris Olympics ==
In 2024, Cupido participated in the 2024 Paris Olympics in the water polo competition where the U.S. team won a third place bronze medal under Head Coach Dejan Udovičić. Serbia was favored to win having taken the gold medal in the prior two Olympics. In the semi-final matches, Serbia defeated the U.S. team 10-6, but recovering in the bronze medal match, the U.S. defeated the team from Hungary 11-8 after scoring in a penalty shoot-out. An important, contributor, Cupido was credited with five total goals at the Paris Olympics. At the end of play, the favored team from Serbia took the gold, and Croatia took the silver.

=== European club play ===
In professional and European-based water polo, Cupido has played for CC Ortigia in his native Italy, and played with Barcelona in Spain in the 2022-23 season. He had formerly played for Italy's Pro Recco and Camogli in Serie A2. In the 2025-2026 season, he signed with Italy's Nordic League-based Rari Nantes Sori team, near his native town of Liguria and coached by Willy Molina.
