= Charles Harris (water polo) =

American water polo player (born 1963)

Personal information
- Full name: Charles Lane Harris
- Born: November 9, 1963 (age 62) Palm Springs, California, U.S.
- Education: Pepperdine Law School (JD 1989)
- Occupation: Attorney
- Height: 195 cm (6 ft 5 in)
- Weight: 93 kg (205 lb)

Sport
- Sport: Water polo
- Position: Driver (WP)
- College team: University Southern California (USC)
- Coached by: John Lowell, Tom Grim (Indio High); John Williams (USC); Bill Barnett (Olympics)

Charles Lane Harris (born November 9, 1963) is a former American water polo player who competed for the University of Southern California. He participated in the men's tournament at the 1992 Barcelona Olympics where the American team placed fourth. After graduating Pepperdine Law School in 1989 and passing the California Bar, he practiced law in California, largely in Los Angeles County.

Harris was born November 9, 1963, in Palm Springs, California. Graduating in June, 1981, he attended Indio High School, Southeast of Palm Springs, where as a water polo player, he received All-American honors from the California Interscholastic Federation (CIF) in 1980, and received All-CIF honors as well. In 1979, at 16, Harris was coached in water polo by Indio High's Head Coach John Lowell, who had coached the team for seven years, and by Assistant Coach Tom Grim, who was scheduled to become Head Coach in 1980. A competent student, in July, 1979, as a Sophomore, Harris made Indio's Honor Roll for the prior semester, requiring a 3.5 grade point average or higher.

== University of Southern California ==
Harris played for the University of Southern California where in 1983 and 1984 he received honors as the team's Most Valuable player, and was a National Collegiate Athletic Association (NCAA) All-American honoree in the years 1982, 1983, and 1984. AT USC, he was managed and trained by Head Coach John Williams and Assistant Coach Jovan Vavic. He scored a season total of 75 goals for Southern Cal in 1984, which at the time was the third most ever scored for the school. In 1984, he served as the USC water polo team captain, and graduated USC in 1985 with a degree in Political Science.

== International highlights ==
Harris became part of the US National team in 1984 and continued through 1992, participating in over 180 matches in international competition. He was highly instrumental in helping the US National team win the Silver medal at the Goodwill Games in Moscow in 1986. He helped lead the US team to a FINA World Championship's gold medal in 1991 in Barcelona, Spain, and to a silver medal at the Pan American games in Havana in 1992. He was part of the US team that won a silver medal at the Maccabiah games in Tel Aviv, Israel. The 1991 medal in the World Cup made the US team one of the favorites to medal in the 1992 Barcelona Olympics, but the US team faced strong competition that year.

== 1992 Barcelona Olympics ==
At the age of 28, Harris participated with the U.S. men's water polo team in the August, 1992 Barcelona Olympics under Head Coach Bill Barnett, a former player for Long Beach State. At the end of the tournament, the U.S. team placed fourth, with Italy taking the gold, Spain taking the silver, and the Unified team taking the bronze. The final game for the gold medal between Spain and Italy was the longest water polo match in Olympic history. Due to their strong performance in 1992, and the US team taking silver Olympic medals in the prior two Olympics, some American media considered the US team a strong contender for a medal that year.

An important contributor to the US team's efforts in the Olympic tournament, Harris was credited with 4 goals and had a steal. The American team placed second in their preliminary series of rounds, achieving a 4–1 record, but losing to the Unified Team 8–5 in a close but disappointing preliminary match. In another critical game, they lost 6–4 to Spain in the semifinal match. In the disappointing bronze medal match, the US water polo team lost 8–4 to the Unified Team. Harris played primarily as a substitute Driver in the water polo matches, a perimeter position that utilized his strength and height. He retired from elite water polo competition not long after the 1992 Olympics.

=== Career ===
Harris continued to play water polo for a year after graduating USC in 1985. He studied law at Pepperdine University beginning in 1986, receiving his J.D. Degree in 1989. He was admitted to the California bar in 1990, and worked for the firm of Tuverson Hillyard in Newport Beach, taking time off to train for the 1992 Olympics. He has worked for the firm of Knecht and Hansen, where he ascended to the role of partner. His areas of legal practice have included Real Estate, and General Business.

=== Honors ===
Harris received the honor of becoming a member of the Southern California Jewish Sports Hall of Fame in 1991.
