= List of United States women's national water polo team rosters =

This article contains lists of women's national water polo team rosters of the United States of America.

== Abbreviations ==
#	Ordering by name	№	Cap number	Ref.	References
L/R	Handedness	L	Left-handed	R	Right-handed
Pos.	Playing position	FP	Field player	GK	Goalkeeper
A	Attacker	C	Center	D	Defender
U	Utility				

== Olympic Games ==
Women's water polo tournaments have been staged at the Olympic Games since 2000. The United States has participated in 5 of 5 tournaments.

=== 2000 Summer Olympics ===
Host city: (Australia) Sydney
Final Ranking: 2nd place ( (silver) Silver medal)
Head coach: (United States) Guy Baker

№	Player	Pos.	Height	L/R	Birthplace	Birthdate	Age	College	Ref.
1	Bernice Orwig	GK	5 ft 11.5 in (1.82 m)		(United States) Anaheim, California	Nov 24, 1976	23 years, 297 days	USC	
2	Heather Petri	A	5 ft 10.5 in (1.79 m)		(United States) Oakland, California	Jun 13, 1978	22 years, 95 days	UC Berkeley	
3	Ericka Lorenz		5 ft 10.5 in (1.79 m)		(United States) San Diego, California	Feb 18, 1981	19 years, 211 days	UC Berkeley	
4	Brenda Villa	A	5 ft 4 in (1.63 m)		(United States) Los Angeles, California	Apr 18, 1980	20 years, 151 days	Stanford	
5	Ellen Estes	FP	5 ft 11.5 in (1.82 m)		(United States) Portland, Oregon	Oct 13, 1978	21 years, 339 days	Stanford	
6	Coralie Simmons		5 ft 7.5 in (1.71 m)		(United States) Hemet, California	Mar 1, 1977	23 years, 199 days	UCLA	
7	Maureen O'Toole	FP	5 ft 9.5 in (1.77 m)		(United States) Long Beach, California	Mar 24, 1961	39 years, 176 days	University of Hawaii	
8	Julie Swail (Captain)		5 ft 8 in (1.73 m)		(United States) Anaheim, California	Dec 27, 1972	27 years, 264 days	UC San Diego	
9	Heather Moody	FP	5 ft 11.5 in (1.82 m)		(United States) Rexburg, Idaho	Aug 21, 1973	27 years, 26 days	San Diego State	
10	Robin Beauregard	FP	5 ft 8.5 in (1.74 m)		(United States) Long Beach, California	Feb 23, 1979	21 years, 206 days	UCLA	
11	Nicolle Payne	GK	5 ft 8.5 in (1.74 m)		(United States) Paramount, California	Jul 15, 1976	24 years, 63 days	UCLA	
12	Kathy Sheehy	FP	5 ft 9.5 in (1.77 m)		(United States) Moraga, California	Apr 26, 1970	30 years, 143 days	San Diego State	
13	Courtney Johnson		5 ft 3.5 in (1.61 m)		(United States) Salt Lake City, Utah	May 7, 1974	26 years, 132 days	UC Berkeley	

=== 2004 Summer Olympics ===
Host city: (Greece) Athens
Final Ranking: 3rd place ( (bronze) Bronze medal)
Head coach: (United States) Guy Baker

№	Player	Pos.	Height	L/R	Birthplace	Birthdate	Age	College	Ref.
1	Jackie Frank	GK	5 ft 10.5 in (1.79 m)		(United States) Hermosa Beach, California	May 1, 1980	24 years, 107 days	Stanford	
2	Heather Petri	A	5 ft 10.5 in (1.79 m)		(United States) Oakland, California	Jun 13, 1978	26 years, 64 days	UC Berkeley	
3	Ericka Lorenz		5 ft 10.5 in (1.79 m)		(United States) San Diego, California	Feb 18, 1981	23 years, 180 days	UC Berkeley	
4	Brenda Villa	A	5 ft 4 in (1.63 m)		(United States) Los Angeles, California	Apr 18, 1980	24 years, 120 days	Stanford	
5	Ellen Estes	FP	5 ft 11.5 in (1.82 m)		(United States) Portland, Oregon	Oct 13, 1978	25 years, 308 days	Stanford	
6	Natalie Golda	D	5 ft 10.5 in (1.79 m)		(United States) Lakewood, California	Dec 28, 1981	22 years, 232 days	UCLA	
7	Margaret Dingeldein		5 ft 5.5 in (1.66 m)		(United States) Merced, California	May 30, 1980	24 years, 78 days	Stanford	
8	Kelly Rulon	A	5 ft 10 in (1.78 m)		(United States) San Diego, California	Aug 16, 1984	20 years, 0 days	UCLA	
9	Heather Moody (Captain)	FP	5 ft 11.5 in (1.82 m)		(United States) Rexburg, Idaho	Aug 21, 1973	30 years, 361 days	San Diego State	
10	Robin Beauregard	FP	5 ft 8.5 in (1.74 m)		(United States) Long Beach, California	Feb 23, 1979	25 years, 175 days	UCLA	
11	Amber Stachowski		5 ft 11.5 in (1.82 m)		(United States) Mission Viejo, California	Mar 14, 1983	21 years, 155 days	UCLA	
12	Nicolle Payne	GK	5 ft 8.5 in (1.74 m)		(United States) Paramount, California	Jul 15, 1976	28 years, 32 days	UCLA	
13	Thalia Munro		5 ft 9.5 in (1.77 m)		(United States) Santa Barbara, California	Mar 8, 1982	22 years, 161 days	UCLA	

=== 2008 Summer Olympics ===
Host city: (China) Beijing
Final Ranking: 2nd place ( (silver) Silver medal)
Head coach: (United States) Guy Baker

№	Player	Pos.	Height	L/R	Birthplace	Birthdate	Age	College	Ref.
1	Betsey Armstrong	GK	6 ft 2 in (1.88 m)	R	(United States) Ann Arbor, Michigan	Mar 14, 1983	25 years, 150 days	University of Michigan	
2	Heather Petri	A	5 ft 10.5 in (1.79 m)	R	(United States) Oakland, California	Jun 13, 1978	30 years, 59 days	UC Berkeley	
3	Brittany Hayes	A	5 ft 6.5 in (1.69 m)	L	(United States) Orange County, California	Feb 7, 1985	23 years, 186 days	USC	
4	Brenda Villa (Captain)	A	5 ft 4 in (1.63 m)	R	(United States) Los Angeles, California	Apr 18, 1980	28 years, 115 days	Stanford	
5	Lauren Wenger	U	6 ft 3 in (1.91 m)	R	(United States) Anaheim, California	Mar 11, 1984	24 years, 153 days	USC	
6	Natalie Golda	D	5 ft 10.5 in (1.79 m)	R	(United States) Lakewood, California	Dec 28, 1981	26 years, 227 days	UCLA	
7	Patty Cardenas	A	5 ft 6.5 in (1.69 m)	R	(United States) Commerce, California	Aug 19, 1984	23 years, 358 days	USC	
8	Jessica Steffens	D	6 ft 0 in (1.83 m)	R	(United States) San Francisco, California	Apr 7, 1987	21 years, 126 days	Stanford	
9	Elsie Windes	D	5 ft 10 in (1.78 m)	R	(United States) Portland, Oregon	Jun 17, 1985	23 years, 55 days	UC Berkeley	
10	Alison Gregorka	D	5 ft 10 in (1.78 m)	R	(United States) Ann Arbor, Michigan	Jun 29, 1985	23 years, 43 days	Stanford	
11	Moriah van Norman	C	5 ft 10 in (1.78 m)	R	(United States) San Diego, California	May 30, 1984	24 years, 73 days	USC	
12	Kami Craig	C	5 ft 11 in (1.80 m)	R	(United States) Camarillo, California	Jul 21, 1987	21 years, 21 days	USC	
13	Jaime Hipp	GK	6 ft 0 in (1.83 m)	R	(United States) Fresno, California	Sep 1, 1981	26 years, 345 days	UCLA	

=== 2012 Summer Olympics ===
Host city: (United Kingdom) London
Final Ranking: 1st place ( (gold) Gold medal)
Head coach: (United States) Adam Krikorian

№	Player	Pos.	Height	L/R	Birthplace	Birthdate	Age	College	Ref.
1	Betsey Armstrong	GK	6 ft 2 in (1.88 m)	R	(United States) Ann Arbor, Michigan	Mar 14, 1983	29 years, 138 days	University of Michigan	
2	Heather Petri	A	5 ft 10.5 in (1.79 m)	R	(United States) Oakland, California	Jun 13, 1978	34 years, 47 days	UC Berkeley	
3	Melissa Seidemann	D	6 ft 0 in (1.83 m)	R	(United States) Hoffman Estates, Illinois	Jun 26, 1990	22 years, 34 days	Stanford	
4	Brenda Villa (Captain)	A	5 ft 4 in (1.63 m)	R	(United States) Los Angeles, California	Apr 18, 1980	32 years, 103 days	Stanford	
5	Lauren Wenger	U	6 ft 3 in (1.91 m)	R	(United States) Anaheim, California	Mar 11, 1984	28 years, 141 days	USC	
6	Maggie Steffens	D	5 ft 8 in (1.73 m)	R	(United States) San Ramon, California	Jun 4, 1993	19 years, 56 days	Stanford	
7	Courtney Mathewson	A	5 ft 7 in (1.70 m)	R	(United States) Orange, California	Sep 14, 1986	25 years, 320 days	UCLA	
8	Jessica Steffens	D	6 ft 0 in (1.83 m)	R	(United States) San Francisco, California	Apr 7, 1987	25 years, 114 days	Stanford	
9	Elsie Windes	D	5 ft 10 in (1.78 m)	R	(United States) Portland, Oregon	Jun 17, 1985	27 years, 43 days	UC Berkeley	
10	Kelly Rulon	A	5 ft 10 in (1.78 m)	R	(United States) San Diego, California	Aug 16, 1984	27 years, 349 days	UCLA	
11	Annika Dries	C	6 ft 0.5 in (1.84 m)	R	(United States) La Jolla, California	Feb 10, 1992	20 years, 171 days	Stanford	
12	Kami Craig	C	5 ft 11 in (1.80 m)	R	(United States) Camarillo, California	Jul 21, 1987	25 years, 9 days	USC	
13	Tumua Anae	GK	5 ft 11 in (1.80 m)	R	(United States) Honolulu, Hawaii	Oct 16, 1988	23 years, 288 days	USC	

=== 2016 Summer Olympics ===
Host city: (Brazil) Rio de Janeiro
Final Ranking: 1st place ( (gold) Gold medal)
Head coach: (United States) Adam Krikorian

№	Player	Pos.	Height	L/R	Birthplace	Birthdate	Age	College	Ref.
1	Sami Hill	GK	6 ft 0 in (1.83 m)	R	(United States) Honolulu, Hawaii	Jun 8, 1992	24 years, 62 days	UCLA	
2	Maddie Musselman	A	5 ft 11 in (1.80 m)	R	(United States) Newport Beach, California	Jun 16, 1998	18 years, 54 days	High school (Committed to UCLA later)	
3	Melissa Seidemann	D	6 ft 0 in (1.83 m)	R	(United States) Hoffman Estates, Illinois	Jun 26, 1990	26 years, 44 days	Stanford	
4	Rachel Fattal	A	5 ft 8 in (1.73 m)	R	(United States) Los Alamitos, California	Dec 10, 1993	22 years, 243 days	UCLA	
5	Caroline Clark	D	6 ft 2 in (1.88 m)	R	(United States) Palo Alto, California	Jun 28, 1990	26 years, 42 days	UCLA	
6	Maggie Steffens (Captain)	A	5 ft 8 in (1.73 m)	R	(United States) San Ramon, California	Jun 4, 1993	23 years, 66 days	Stanford	
7	Courtney Mathewson	A	5 ft 7 in (1.70 m)	R	(United States) Orange, California	Sep 14, 1986	29 years, 330 days	UCLA	
8	Kiley Neushul	A	5 ft 8 in (1.73 m)	R	(United States) Goleta, California	Mar 5, 1993	23 years, 157 days	Stanford	
9	Aria Fischer	C	6 ft 0 in (1.83 m)	R	(United States) Laguna Beach, California	Mar 2, 1999	17 years, 160 days	High school (Committed to Stanford later)	
10	Kaleigh Gilchrist	A	5 ft 9 in (1.75 m)	R	(United States) Newport Beach, California	May 16, 1992	24 years, 85 days	USC	
11	Makenzie Fischer	D	6 ft 1 in (1.85 m)	R	(United States) Laguna Beach, California	Mar 29, 1997	19 years, 133 days	Stanford	
12	Kami Craig	C	5 ft 11 in (1.80 m)	R	(United States) Camarillo, California	Jul 21, 1987	29 years, 19 days	USC	
13	Ashleigh Johnson	GK	6 ft 1 in (1.85 m)	R	(United States) Miami, Florida	Sep 12, 1994	21 years, 332 days	Princeton	

== World Aquatics Championships ==
Women's water polo tournaments have been staged at the World Aquatics Championships since 1986. The United States has participated in 14 of 14 tournaments.

== FINA Water Polo World Cup ==
The FINA Women's Water Polo World Cup was established in 1979. The United States has participated in 17 of 17 tournaments.

== Pan American Games ==
Women's water polo tournaments have been staged at the Pan American Games since 1999. The United States has participated in 6 of 6 tournaments.

== See also ==
- List of United States men's national water polo team rosters
- United States women's national water polo team
- USA Water Polo
