= Adam Wright (water polo) =

American water polo player (born 1977)

Current position
- Title: Head coach
- Team: UCLA Men's & Women's water polo
- Conference: MPSF
- Record: 43-13 (11-5 MPSF)

Biographical details
- Born: May 4, 1977 (age 49); Huntington Beach, California, U.S.

Playing career
- 1997–2000: UCLA
- Position: Attacker

Coaching career (HC unless noted)
- 2004, 2006-08: UCLA Men's water polo (Asst.)
- 2007-09: Women's water polo (Asst.)
- 2009-present: UCLA Men's water polo
- 2018-present: UCLA Women's water polo

Accomplishments and honors

Championships
- NCAA Men's Championship 2014, 2015, 2017, 2020, 2024, 2025 (Head Coach); NCAA Women's Championship 2008-09 (Asst. Coach); NCAA Championship 1999, 2000 (Player)

Awards
- All-American 1997–2000; All-MPSF1997-2000; MPSF Men's Water Polo Coach of the Year (2011, 2017, 2023,2024, 2025); MPSF Women's Water Polo Coach of the Year (2024, 2025)
Medal record
Men's water polo
Representing the United States
Olympic Games
| Silver medal – second place | 2008 Beijing | Team |
Pan American Games
| Gold medal – first place | 2011 Guadalajara | Team |

Adam Wright (born May 4, 1977) is an American water polo player and a college water polo head coach. He was a member of the United States men's national water polo team at the 2008 Beijing Olympics. In the championship game, the USA team won the silver medal, defeated by Hungary.

On June 3, 2009, Wright was named the head coach of the UCLA Bruins men's water polo team, having served as its men's and women's water polo team assistant coach.

== College ==
Wright attended UCLA and played water polo for the NCAA championship team. During his years at UCLA, his team won back-to-back NCAA championships in 1999 and 2000. During his senior year, he was named as honorable mention on the All-America team and was on the All-MPSF second-team for his 39 goals on 76 attempts.

As a junior in 1999, he was named to the All-America third-team and All-MPSF second-team. He had 48 points (second on the team), 27 assists (first), and 39 steals. At UCLA, Wright was coached by Guy Baker, the former USA women's water polo team coach.

== Career ==
Wright has served as the head coach of the UCLA Bruins men's water polo team, after serving as an assistant coach for both the men's and women's teams. He was a member of the 2004 and 2008 USA water polo team.

During his playing career, Wright, a driver, played tough defense and was a good scorer. At the 2007 Pan American Games, he had four goals to help the American team gain a berth in the Beijing Olympics. Additionally, he scored five goals at the 2007 FINA World Championships.

After graduation from UCLA with degrees in history and sociology, Wright played water polo for Bissolati Cremona (2007), Civitavecchia in Italy (2006), Nuoto Catania in Sicily (2005–06), and Dynamo in Moscow (2004–05).

As an assistant coach at UCLA, his women's water polo team won the 2009 NCAA Women's Water Polo Championship, 5-4 over USC Trojans.

On December 7, 2014, he led his UCLA men's water polo team to the NCAA Men's Water Polo Championship, defeating USC 9–8 at the University of California, San Diego's Canyonview Pool. It was UCLA's 9th title in men's water polo. Wright has since gone on to lead the Bruins to win the national titles for the 2015, 2017, and 2020 seasons, the latter of which was delayed to early 2021 because of the COVID-19 pandemic.

== Awards ==
In 2019, Wright was inducted into the USA Water Polo Hall of Fame.

- MPSF Men's Water Polo Coach of the Year (2011, 2017, 2023, 2024, 2025)
- MPSF Women's Water Polo Coach of the Year (2024, 2025)

== Early years ==
He attended Long Beach's Wilson High School and played on the school's water polo team. The team won the 1994 Division I CIF championship when he was there and Wright was named 1995 CIF Division I Player-of-the-Year. During his high school playing years, he scored 309 goals and was the recipient of All-American honors for three seasons. He was coached by Ricardo Azevedo, his Olympics teammate Tony Azevedo's father, at Wilson.

== Personal ==
Wright was born in Huntington Beach, California, and has listed Seal Beach, California, as his hometown. He is 6'3" tall and weighs 195 lbs. He was married in 2006. His father Steve was a pitcher in a minor league baseball team, and his brother Randy was on UCLA's championship teams of 1995 and 1996.

== See also ==
- List of Olympic medalists in water polo (men)
