= Thomas Hopkins (water polo) =

American water polo player (born 1984)

Personal information
- Born: April 13, 1984 (age 42)
- Height: 5 ft 11 in (180 cm)
- Weight: 185 lb (84 kg)

Sport
- Sport: Water polo
- College team: Stanford University
- Coached by: John Vargas (Stanford)
Medal record
Representing United States
Pan American Games
Gold medal – first place	2007 Rio de Janeiro	Team competition

Thomas Hopkins (born 13 April 1984) is an American water polo player. He was a member of the United States men's national water polo team and competed at the 2007 FINA Men's Water Polo World League.

== Early life ==
Hopkins attended Coronado High School, where he played three sports earning letters in water polo, soccer and tennis in all four years. He captained his High School team in his Senior year, and in 2001 received honors as a Most Valuable Player, California Interscholastic Federation Player of the Year and All-American. On the soccer team, he was twice a Most Valuable Offensive Player and in tennis was a Most Valuable Player three times. Playing for Coronado High, in the 2001 CIF Water Polo Championship in waterpolo, he was credited with the winning goal.

== Stanford University ==
Hopkins played college water polo at Stanford University, from around 2002-2005 where he majored in Civil Engineering and competed at the 2004 NCAA Men's Water Polo Championship and 2005 NCAA Men's Water Polo Championship. At Stanford, he was managed by Head Water Polo Coach John Vargas who had formerly competed at the 1992 Olympics. In his Junior year at Stanford in 2004, Hopkins was credited with 60 season goals, the second most on the team, and received honors as a first team All American by the American Water Polo Coaches Association (AWPCA). At the NCAA championship game, he scored two goals against UCLA, and received honors as All-NCAA Tournament First Team.

In his Sophomore year at Stanford in 2003, he received an honorable mention recognition by the American Water Polo Coaches Association, and with a total of 47 goals was the team's second leading season scorer.

In his Freshman year at Stanford in 2002, he was credited with a total of 24 goals, and was credited with a goal at the NCAA championship game where Stanford won the National Championship.

In international competition, he part of the US National team that won a gold medal at the 2007 Pan American Games in Rio de Janeiro.

== Careers ==
Hopkins has worked at Penn Interactive Ventures since graduating Stanford.
