= Alex Roelse =

American water polo player (born 1995)

Personal information
- Full name: Alex Willem Roelse
- Nationality: American
- Born: January 10, 1995 (age 31) Gorinchem, Netherlands
- Height: 204 cm (6 ft 8 in)
- Weight: 115 kg (254 lb)

Sport
- Country: Dutch-born American citizen
- Sport: Water polo
- Position: Utility player (WP)
- College team: University of California Los Angeles
- Club: UZSC Ultrech, Netherlands; Widex GZC, Gouda Netherlands
- Coached by: Adam Wright (UCLA); Dejan Udovičić (Olympics)
Medal record
Representing United States
Pan American Games
Gold medal – first place	2015 Toronto	Team competition

Alex Willem Roelse (born January 10, 1995) is a former Dutch-born American water polo player who competed for UCLA and participated with the US team at the 2016 Rio de Janeiro Olympics.

== Early life ==
Roelse was born January 10, 1995 in Gorinchem, Netherlands to parents Pieter and Mary Roelse, one of two children with an older sister Susan. For his last two years of High School, Roelse attended Winford Stebo in Utrecht, Netherlands, where he played club water polo since his school did not have a team. In Club water polo during his High School years, he started playing with UZSC in Utrecht, Netherlands, winning two national championships in his first year in 2006, and continued with the UZSC club team through 2010. Beginning in 2011, he played club water polo with Widex GZC Donk in Gouda, Netherlands. He played with the National Youth team of the Netherlands from 2008-2012, beginning to train primarily at the Netherland's National Training Center in 2012. He played on four Dutch National Championship teams while participating in Dutch regional training programshere he was coached by Laszlo Boros of Hungary.

During his debut as one of the youngest players on the Dutch Senior National team in November 2013, he helped them place second at an international tournament in Gzira, Malta. He played with the Dutch National team for three years through around 2015, when he began playing primarily for the US National team.

== University of California Los Angeles ==
Roelse competed for the University of California Los Angeles from 2014 to 2017, majoring in business economics. Managed and trained by Head Coach Adam Wright, Roelse was a member of UCLA's 2014 NCAA Water Polo Championship team. During his college years, he was somewhat versatile in the position he played, usually being defined as a Utility player, who could play multiple positions. As a Senior at UCLA in 2017, Roelse received All-American first team honors, and All-NCAA first team honors. In academics, for the quarters in winter and spring, he made the University Honor Roll. He had a total of 117 total goals while playing for UCLA, with a season high of 35 during his Senior year.

In 2018, Roelse served as an Assistant Coach with UCLA men's water polo for a year.

== 2016 Rio de Janeiro Olympics ==
Roelse competed with the US team in the men's water polo tournament at the 2016 Rio Olympics under Head Coach Dejan Udovičić, where the U.S. placed 10th overall, with Serbia taking the gold, Croatia taking the silver medal, and Italy taking the bronze. Coming off the bench, he scored one goal on two attempts, and was credited with one assist and one steal in the four 2016 Olympic games in which he played.

=== International competition ===
Roelse played with the US Team at the 2018 FINA World Cup in Berlin, scoring one goal, with the team placing 6th overall. Making a strong showing at the 2018 FINA World League Super Final, he scored five goals. Roelse played with the US National Team at the Pan American Games where he received a gold medal in 2015 in Toronto, Ontario, Canada.
