= Kyle Kopp =

American water polo player (born 1966)

Personal information
- Full name: Kyle Merton Kopp
- Born: November 10, 1966 (age 59) San Bernardino, California, US
- Occupations: Swimming, Water Polo Coach
- Height: 200 cm (6 ft 7 in)
- Weight: 104 kg (229 lb)

Sport
- Sport: Water polo, Swimming, Basketball
- College team: Long Beach State
- Coached by: Ken Lindgren (Long Beach State); Richard Corso (1996 Olympics); John Vargas (2000 Olympics)

Kyle Merton Kopp (born November 10, 1966) is a former American swimmer and water polo player. He competed on the US Water Polo team at the 1996 Atlanta Olympics and the 2000 Sydney Olympics. Turning to coaching around 2001, he helped coach the medal-winning USA Women's Senior National Team and was the Coach of the USA Women's Youth National Team. He has had an accomplished career as the Coach of the Women's swimming and water polo teams for Golden West College.

== Early life ==
Kyle Kopp was born November 10, 1966 in San Bernardino, California. He was a standout varsity swimmer first at Pacific High School, and then a star 2-meter hole water polo player on San Bernardino High School's varsity team, where he was coached by David Smith. Kopp won All-CIF honors while at San Bernardino High, and was the San Bernardino County Sun's Prep Athlete of the Week after leading his High School water polo team to the Fontana Tournament Championship after scoring 34 goals in four winning games in September, 1984. Kopp also played varsity basketball beginning in his High School Sophomore year playing center as an upperclassman, and continued as a three-sport letterman until his graduation from San Bernardino High in 1985.

== Collegiate career ==
He initially attended the University of California Riverside until an injury sidelined his basketball career.

Transferring to Long Beach State, he had a successful collegiate career playing water polo under LBSU Coach Ken Lindgren. Lindgren, a Water Polo Hall of Fame Inductee, played water polo for Long Beach, coached their team for 24 seasons beginning in 1975, and served on the US Olympic coaching staff. Playing for Long Beach State Water Polo, Kopp was an All American three times, and was part of the All-tournament team for the NCAA Championship in both 1989 and 1988. He received Big West Conference Most Valuable Player Honors in 1990 and 1988 and completed his Long Beach State water polo career with a school record of 231 total goals scored. A multi-sport athlete, Kopp also won three letters in varsity swimming at Long Beach and was part of a 4-person 200-meter freestyle relay team that had the fastest time in the school's history.

== 1996 Atlanta Olympics ==
Kopp participated in the 1996 Atlanta Olympics, under Head Coach Richard Corso where the US team placed seventh overall among 12 competing countries. Though Hungary and Italy were the strong pre-Olympic favorites, Spain defeated Hungary 7-6 in the semi-finals. In the final game Spain beat Croatia, and captured the gold medal with a score of 7-5, leaving Croatia the silver medal, and pre-game favorite Italy the bronze.

== 2000 Sydney Olympics ==
Kopp participated with the US Men's water polo team for the second time at the 2000 Sydney Olympics under Olympic Coach John Vargas. Kopp was part of the US team that completed the Olympics with an overall sixth-place finish among twelve competing countries. In preliminary rounds, the US team defeated the Netherlands and Croatia, both traditionally strong teams, but lost their last match in the final round 10–8 to Italy. Perennial pre-game favorite Hungary took the gold medal, Russia took the silver, and the historically dominant team from Yugoslavia took the bronze, having had more total goals than the United States. Hungary easily defeated rival Russia in the final game by a score of 13-6, leading in each of the first three periods by a score of 3-1, 8-2, and 10-4 respectively.

Kopp played professional water polo in Greece for five years prior to retiring from water polo as a career.

=== Careers ===
After his career as a competitive water polo player, Kopp began a career in coaching. Beginning around 2001, he was part of the coaching staff for the USA Women's Senior National Team that captured gold medals at the 2007 and 2003 World Aquatic Championships, a bronze medal at the 2004 Olympics, and a silver at the 2008 Olympics. He has worked as the Coach of the USA Women's Youth National Team, and has coached Women's swimming and water polo teams for Golden West College.

=== Honors ===
In 2011, he was inducted into the USA Water Polo Hall of Fame, and became a member of the Long Beach State University Hall of Fame in 1995.
