= Rick Merlo =

American water polo player (born 1982)

- Merlo on U.S. National team in 2008

Personal information
- Born: August 5, 1982 (age 43) Fresno, California, U.S.
- Occupation(s): Professional Water Polo; Coaching Water Polo
- Height: 191 cm (6 ft 3 in)
- Weight: 98 kg (216 lb)

Sport
- Sport: Swimming, Water Polo
- Position: Defender, Hole D
- College team: University of California, Irvine
- Coached by: Ted Newland, Marc Hunt (UC Irvine); Ted Schroeder ('08 Olympics)
Medal record
Men's water polo
Representing the United States
Olympic Games
Silver medal – second place	2008 Beijing	Team competition

Rick Lewis Merlo (born August 5, 1982) is an American water polo player who competed for the University of California Irvine and was a member of the United States men's national water polo team at the 2008 Beijing Olympics that won the team silver medal.

== High school ==
Merlo was born in Fresno, California on August 5, 1982. Taking up water polo at an early age, he followed his older brother Mark, who was an All-American in water polo and Academics at UC Irvine. From an athletic family, Curt, his younger brother was also on UC Irvine's water polo team. Rick Merlo was a California Interscholastic Federation (CIF) Champion at Buchanan High School in 1997 and 2000. He was a four-year letterman in both Water Polo and swimming at Buchanan, and led Buchanan to win the Section championship in Water Polo in his High School Freshman and Senior seasons. In his Senior year, he was high scorer for his section. He was a CIF Most Valuable Player, First-Team All-American, All-League, and All-CIF in 2000.

== University of California, Irvine ==
Like his brother Mark, Merlo attended University of California, Irvine and played water polo under Water Polo Hall of Fame Coach Ted Newland and his successor Marc Hunt. Merlo attended UC Irvine from around 2001-2005, majoring in Sociology. During his collegiate years, Merlo was named a First-Team All-American, First-Team All-Mountain Pacific Sports Federation (MPSF), and a Scholar Athlete in 2005. In 2004, he was named a Third Team All-American and Second-Team All-MPSF. In most of his play, Merlo was a Hole-D or Center Defender, guarding the Center position near the center of the goal, and on offense playing point, primarily in the center of the court.

== 2008 Beijing Olympic silver medal ==
Merlo represented the United States in water polo in the Team competition at the September, 2008 Beijing Olympics where he was coached by USA Water Polo Hall of Fame Coach and Pepperdine Coach Terry Schroeder, a former Olympic silver medalist. The U.S. water polo team was originally ranked ninth going into the Olympics, but in an upset beat the highly rated team from Serbia in the semifinals prior to losing to Hungary in the final game for the gold and silver medals. The Hungarian team, dominant on the world stage, had won 9 Olympic gold medals in Olympic play. During the Olympics, Merlo scored two goals. Schroeder would later coach the American Water Polo team at the 2012 London Olympics to an eighth-place finish. In the final Olympic round of water polo between the U.S. and Hungary, The Hungarian team scored five straight goals in the final two quarters. The American team lost to Hungary 14-10, but fought well throughout the first two quarters, and had tied the score 9-9 going into the third quarter of play.

In international competition,, Merlo competed at the 2003 World University Games in Daegu, South Korea where he placed 8th, and participated in the 2006 FINA World League Super Final. He was on the U.S. National Team at FINA World Championships in 2005, and 2007.

== Professional pursuits ==
In 2005, Merlo played professional water polo for Genova Italy Nervi from 2006-7 and in 2007 played for Brazil.

He served as an Assistant coach at Fresno Pacific University.

== See also ==
- List of Olympic medalists in water polo (men)
