= Brian Alexander (water polo) =

American water polo player (born 1983)

Personal information
- Nickname: Thor
- Born: May 3, 1983 (age 43) Santa Ana, California, United States
- Education: UC Santa Barbara
- Years active: 2004–2012
- Height: 6 ft 3 in (191 cm)
- Weight: 220 lb (100 kg)

Sport
- Country: United States
- Sport: Men's water polo
- Position: Field
- University team: UC Santa Barbara men's water polo
- Club: Aguas De Valencia; NO Patras; Victorian Tigers; Olympic Club
- Turned pro: 2005
Medal record
Men's water polo
Representing the United States
Pan American Games
Gold medal – first place	2011 Guadalajara	Men's Water Polo
- Updated on 20:31, September 17, 2014 (UTC)

Brian Alexander (born May 3, 1983) is a former American water polo player who was a member of the United States men's national water polo team.

== Early life and education ==
Alexander attended Foothill High School. He played for the high school's water polo team and was named to the All-CIF Division I boys water polo team after scoring 91 goals in his senior year.

Alexander enrolled at and attended the University of California, Santa Barbara. He played collegiate water polo for the UC Santa Barbara Gauchos and was named a 3rd team All-American in 2003 and 2004 while playing with the Gauchos.

== Playing career ==
Alexander started his professional career in Spain in 2005 with Spain's Aguas De Valencia. He stayed with the club until 2007 before joining Greek side NO Patras in 2008 and stayed until 2009.

2010 saw Alexander move to Australian National Water Polo League club Victorian Tigers and was named to the 2010 All Star team en route to winning the 2010 NWPL Championship. He remained with the club through the 2011 season.

While competing overseas, Alexander has been with San Francisco, California-based Olympic Club as early as 2009.

=== International ===
==== Junior teams ====
Alexander represented the United States on the Junior National Team from 2002 to 2003. Alexander, with other Juniors players, was named to the United States "B" team in May 2003 for play in the 2003 US Cup, held at Stanford Cardinal's Avery Aquatic Center.

The US Cup served as a final tune-up for the 2003 FINA Junior Water Polo World Championships held in August in Naples, Italy, to which Alexander was named. He led the team with 12 goals as the US beat Belgium for 11th place.

==== Senior team ====
Alexander joined the full United States men's national water polo team in 2005, appearing in the 2005 ASUA World Championships as well as the 2005 FINA World Championships.

He continued with the team and played in the 2007 FINA World Championships and 2008 FINA Men's Water Polo World League in preparation for the 2008 Summer Olympics in London, but was one of the last cut players and ultimately was named as an alternate.

Alexander persevered, setting his sights on the 2012 Summer Olympics. He participated with the senior national team in a number of major competitions including: 2009 FINA Men's Water Polo World League, 2010 FINA Men's Water Polo World League, 2011 FINA Men's Water Polo World League, 2009 FINA World Championships, 2011 FINA World Championships, 2010 FINA Men's Water Polo World Cup, 2011 Pan American Games, and the 2012 Pan Pacific Water Polo Championships.

Despite being a regular on the national team and participating in qualifying for the 2012 FINA Men's Water Polo World League, Alexander missed out on being named to the Super Final roster. It was a sign of things to come as shortly after that he was not called to the 2012 Olympic team and did not appear in any further major competitions for the team.
