= Tim Hutten =

American water polo player (born 1985)

Personal information
- Born: June 4, 1985 (age 41) Los Alamitos, California
- Height: 196 cm (6 ft 5 in)
- Weight: 98 kg (216 lb)

Sport
- Sport: Water Polo
- Position: Center Defender (2-meter)
- College team: University of California, Irvine
- Club: Newport Water Polo Foundation; Newport Beach
- Coached by: Ted Newland, Marc Hunt (UC Irvine); Ted Schroeder ('08 Olympics)
Medal record
Men's water polo
Representing the United States
Olympic Games
Silver medal – second place	2008 Beijing	Team
Pan American Games
Gold medal – first place	2011 Guadalajara	Team

Timothy Julien Hutten (born June 4, 1985) is an American water polo player who competed for the University of California, Irvine, and represented the United States men's national water polo team at the 2008 Beijing Olympics where the team won a silver medal, the first U.S. medal in the sport for two decades. Hutten also competed at the 2012 Summer Olympics where the U.S. team placed eighth. As an exceptional college athlete, Hutten won the Peter J. Cutino award in 2008, given to that year's top collegiate water polo player.

Tim Hutten was born June 4, 1985 to Cindy and Julien Hutten in Los Alamitos, California, and grew up around Seal Beach where he was a 2003 graduate of Los Alamitos High School. Taking to the water as an infant, Hutten started swimming at the Seal Beach Community pool in his first year escorted by his mother. While in eighth grade at Oak Middle School, Hutten won a second place prize in a local photography contest. Hutten was a strong swimmer, and enjoyed surfing in his early years, frequently spending time at the beach. From an athletic family that valued water polo, Tim's father Julien swam and played water polo for California State Los Angeles, though as he died shortly before Tim's birth, he was unable to see his son's remarkable achievements as an athlete.

== University of California, Irvine ==
Hutten attended classes and played college water polo at the University of California, Irvine where he graduated in 2007, majoring in Political Science. He was trained and managed by coaches Ted Newland and Marc Hunt at U. Cal. Irving, and as a Senior was a 2008 Cutino Award winner. Indicating a particularly high level of achievement in the sport, the Peter J. Cutino award is given to the most outstanding collegiate water polo player of the year.

A noteworthy student, Hutten was an All-academic selection as an athlete at UC Irvine, though had not always scored top marks as a High School underclassman. While at the University of California Irvine, in 2007 he was a Player of the Year for the Mountain Pacific Sports Federation (MPSF), with an exceptional 3.75 average of goals per game, and in the same year was a Most Valuable Player in the MPSF Tournament. Consistently contributing to U. Cal Irvine's water polo team throughout his collegiate career, he earned All-American honors in 2005, 2006, and in 2007, was recognized as an All American first team.

== 2008-2012 Olympics ==
=== 2008 Beijing silver medal ===
Hutten participated in the Beijing 2008 Olympics in the men's water polo team competition under Head Coach Terry Schroeder, where he was instrumental in leading the U.S. team to the silver medal. Hungary took the gold medal and Serbia took the bronze. At the Beijing water polo semi-finals, Hungary, a pre-Olympic favorite, beat Montenegro 11-9, and the U.S. team, in the other semi-final, had an unexpected victory over the strong men's team from Serbia, with a score of 10-5. For the first three quarters in the final gold and silver medal match between Hungary and the U.S., both teams stayed close, though Hungary held a 9-8 halftime lead. Scoring in the opening of the third quarter, the U.S. team tied the score at 9-9, but Hungary surged ahead with five unanswered goals, winning the gold medal by a score of 14-10, despite the U.S. team making one last goal.

=== 2012 London Olympics ===
Continuing to compete on an elite level, Hutton again represented the U.S. in the August 2012 Olympics in London, where the U.S. placed eighth overall, Croatia took the gold medal, Italy took the silver, and Serbia took the bronze.

=== International competition ===
In international competition, he was part of the U.S. National team that in 2011 won a gold medal in Guadalajara at the Pan American Games, and in both 2009 and 2011 competed at the FINA World Championships as part of the U.S. team.

=== Honors ===
As noted earlier, in 2008 Hutten was a recipient of the Peter J. Cutino Trophy.

== See also ==
- List of Olympic medalists in water polo (men)
- UC Irvine Anteaters
