= Ryan Bailey (water polo) =

American water polo player (born 1975)

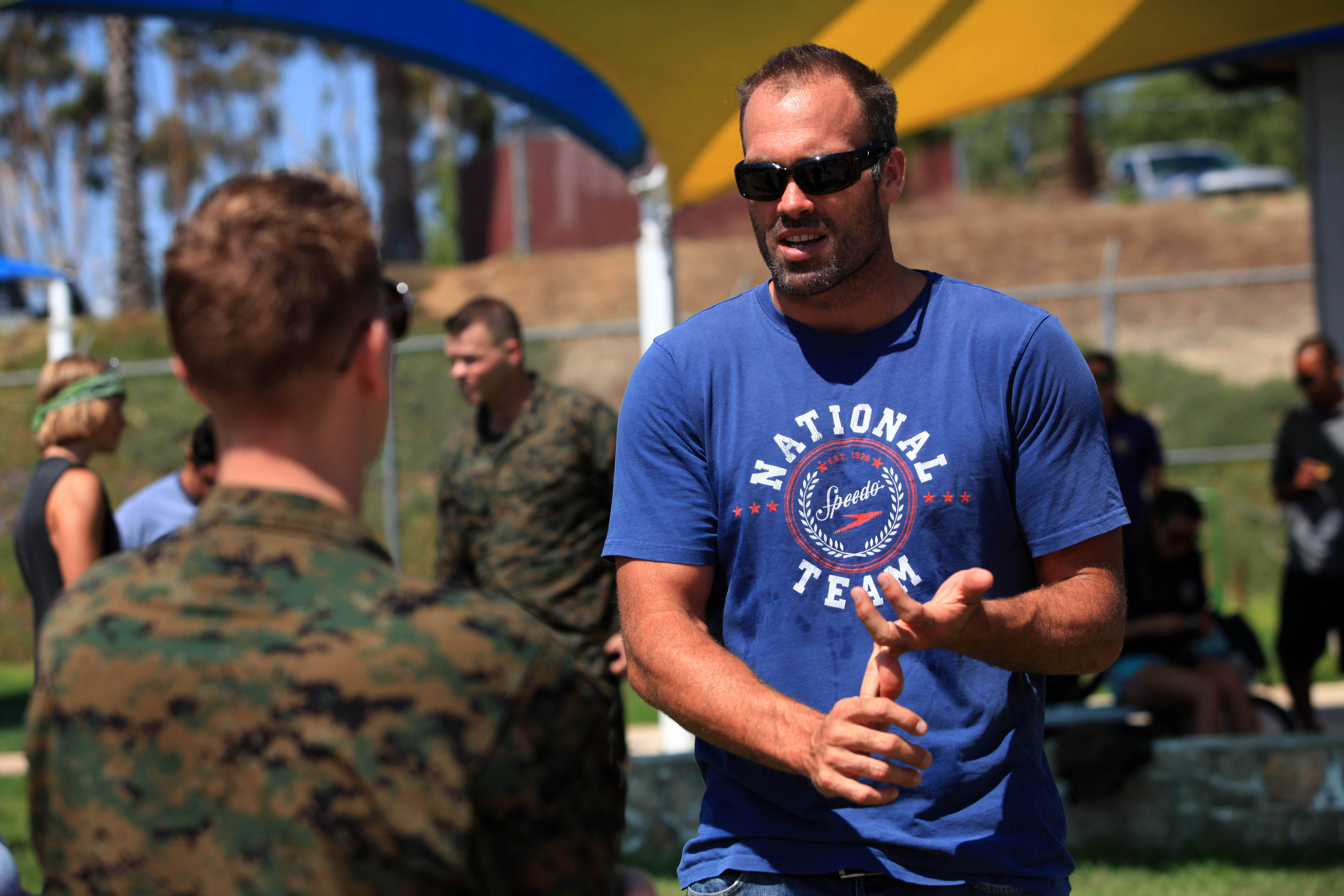
- Bailey interacts with a Marine during his surprise visit for a combat water polo tournament at Camp Pendleton’s 13 Area Pool, September 12, 2012

Personal information
- National team: USA
- Born: August 28, 1975 (age 50) Long Beach, California
- Height: 198 cm (6 ft 6 in)
- Weight: 111 kg (245 lb)

Sport
- Sport: Water Polo
- Position: Center
- College team: UC Irvine (1998)
- Club: Olympic Club
- Coached by: Ted Newland (UC Irvine)
Medal record
Men's water polo
Representing the United States
Olympic Games
Silver medal – second place	2008 Beijing	Team
Pan American Games
Gold medal – first place	2011 Guadalajara	Team

Ryan Bailey (born August 28, 1975) is an American water polo player and Olympic silver medallist who competed for U.C. Irvine. He competed in water polo in each of the Summer Olympic games between 2000 and 2012 and won an Olympic silver medal in water polo in the 2008 Beijing Olympics. After his amateur career in Water Polo, he played professionally, coached, and competed in the U.S. with Masters Water Polo.

== Early life ==
Bailey was born August 28, 1975 in Long Beach, California, to Dan and Kay Bailey, the younger of three children which included an older brother and sister. Beginning to play water polo by Elementary School, he later attended classes and competed in Water Polo for Millikan High School graduating in 1994. As a Junior at Millikan High, he was named a Division I All Southern Section second team choice. Though he would continue to improve, the greater Los Angeles area had very competitive High School water polo teams.

=== UC Irvine 1994-98 ===
During his collegiate years, he attended UC Irvine in Irvine, California, graduating in 1998 with a degree in Social Science. As a Water Polo Player for UC Irvine, he was a four-time All-American, tallied 104 goals in his senior season, and was awarded the Mountain Pacific Sports Federation Player of the Year in 1998. During his collegiate career, he was managed and trained by Head Coach Ted Newland, a Water Polo Hall of Fame member, who from 1996-2005, led UC Irvine to three National Championships and a consistent rating among the top five water polo teams in the nation. During his years with UC Irvine, the Anteaters Water Polo team earned a record of 63-38, and had their best finish in 1995, earning fourth place in the U.S.

== Olympics ==
He was a member of the United States men's national water polo team for the 2000, 2004, 2008, and 2012 Summer Olympics. In the 2000 Sydney Olympics, the U.S. Water Polo team finished 6th overall. In the 2004 Athens Olympics, he scored two goals, with the team finishing seventh overall, and rival Hungary winning the gold, Serbia and Montenegro taking the Silver, and the Russian Federation taking the Bronze.

=== 2008 Beijing Silver medal ===
He was part of the U.S. Water Polo team for the 2008 Beijing Olympics, where in the championship game coached by head U.S. Coach Terry Schroeder of Pepperdine University, the US Olympic team won the silver medal, with Hungary winning the gold. Bailey scored a late game goal in a critical semi-final match against Serbia, which helped the U.S. Olympic team to the final round against Hungary, a dominant world power. America's final game with Hungary for the gold or silver medal, stayed close through the third quarter, though Hungary held a 9-8 halftime lead. Scoring early in quarter three, the US team tied the game up 9-9, but Hungary pulled away decisively with five successive goals, before the US added their last goal with two minutes left to play. Hungary won the gold medal with a score in the final match of 14-10. Four of the members of the team had swum for UC Irvine, likely under Coach Ted Newland. This was one of the highest finishes in the Summer Olympics for a USA Water Polo team.

Bailey was the leading scorer for the US team at the 2012 London Olympics with 13 goals scored throughout all the rounds. In several high scoring games, the U.S. team finished 8th overall.

=== Pan American gold medals ===
Team USA finished with a silver medal at the 1997 FINA World Cup.

In a high point of his international career, Bailey was on U.S. teams that won team gold medals at four Pan American Games. His U.S. Water Polo team won the gold medal in 1999 at the Pan American games in Winnipeg, Canada, and again won the gold medal at the Pan American games in Santo Domingo in 2003. In the 2007 Pan American Games, the U.S. Water Polo Team won the team gold in Rio de Janeiro, and again took the gold medals in the Pan American Games in 2011 in Guadalajara.

Bailey played Center initially as a back-up with the U.S. team, later becoming a starter and leader of the U.S. National Team offense.

== Professional ==
Bailey has played professionally for a number of European water polo clubs, and played in two European Championships :

- 2004: VK Jug Dubrovnik in Croatia
- 2004–2005: Dynamo Moscow
- 2005–2006: VK Jadran Split in Croatia
- 2006: Panionios in Greece
- 2007–2009: VK Partizan in Serbia

He remained connected to the Water Polo community through 2020 through coaching, teaching the occasional clinic, and competing with the Olympic Club in Masters Water Polo.

== Honors ==
In 2019, in his most noteworthy distinction, Bailey was inducted into the USA Water Polo Hall of Fame. Bailey was a United States Olympic Committee Water Polo Male Athlete of the Year in both 2002 and 2001. During his career, he was named Outstanding Offensive Player at 2006 Premier League Championships, and the American Water Polo League Outstanding Offensive Player in 2003.

== See also ==
- List of Olympic medalists in water polo (men)
- List of players who have appeared in multiple men's Olympic water polo tournaments
