= Alex Wolf (water polo) =

American water polo player (born 1997)

Personal information
- Full name: Alexander David Wolf
- Nationality: United States
- Born: April 19, 1997 (age 29) Anaheim, U.S.
- Height: 6 ft 7 in (2.01 m)

Sport
- Sport: Water polo
- College team: UCLA
Medal record
Representing United States
Pan American Games
Gold medal – first place	2019 Lima	Team

Alexander David "Alex" Wolf (born April 19, 1997) is an American water polo player. He competed in the 2020 Summer Olympics.

== Biography ==
Alex Wolf was born in Anaheim, California. He grew up in Huntington Beach California where he attended Huntington Beach High School (HBHS), Class of 2015. When he was twelve years old, he began participating in the USA Water Polo Olympic Development Program. He continued playing at HBHS and then at University of California Los Angeles (UCLA). During high school and college, he also played on the Cadet, Youth, Junior, and Senior National Teams.

As a freshman at HBHS, Alex started on the Junior Varsity water polo team. As a sophomore he was made starting goalie for Varsity. During high school he was MVP for all four years, earned Sunset League First Team Honors for three years, and CIF First Team Honors and All American for two years. As a junior he was named to the All-Orange-County Second Team. In his senior year he was named All Orange County Player of the Year. As a sophomore, he set the school record for saves in a single season and broke that record as a junior and set a new one as a senior.

Alex also played volleyball all four years at Huntington Beach High School. His team went undefeated for three and a half years. He was a starting middle blocker and won two CIF championships. In his senior year he was named to All Orange County First Team.

== Education ==
Alex graduated from UCLA with a degree in Economics. As an Incoming Freshman in the summer of 2015, he was the starting goalie at the World University Games, where UCLA represented the USA. The won a bronze medal. Alex played backup goalie his freshman year when he won his first NCAA Championship. He redshirted his sophomore year in anticipation of ending his college career at the beginning of the training run for the 2020 Olympics. He earned CWPA All -All American honors 3 times. During his junior year he won a second NCAA Championship and was named MVP of the tournament. He was nominated for the Cutino Award during his Senior year.

== Career ==
- 2011-2012 USA Water Polo Cadet National Team
- 2012-2013 USA Water Polo Cadet National Team
- 2013-2014 USA Water Polo Youth National Team
- 2014 USA Water Polo Youth National Team
  - UANA Junior Pan American Championships –Riverside, CA Gold Medal
  - Memorial di Acireale Tournament - Sicily
  - Istanbul Cup - Istanbul, Turkey
  - FINA World Youth Championships – Istanbul, Turkey
- 2015 USA Water Polo Senior National Team
  - AQUATIC SUPER SERIES, PERTH, AUSTRALIA
- 2015 USA Water Polo Youth National Team
  - World University Games -Seoul South Korea Bronze Medal
- 2017 USA Water Polo Senior National Team
  - FINA MEN'S INTERCONTINENTAL QUALIFYING TOURNAMENT, GOLD COAST, AUSTRALIA, Silver Medal & Best Goal Keeper
- 2018 USA Water Polo Senior National Team
  - FINA INTERCONTINENTAL TOURNAMENT, AUCKLAND, NEW ZEALAND, Gold Medal
  - FINA WORLD LEAGUE SUPER FINAL, BUDAPEST, HUNGARY, 7TH PLACE
- 2019 USA Water Polo Senior National Team
  - China Wenjiang International Water Polo Tournament Gold Medal
  - FINA WORLD CHAMPIONSHIPS, GWANGJU, SOUTH KOREA, 9TH PLACE
  - PAN AMERICAN GAMES, LIMA, PERU, 1ST PLACE
- 2020 COVID
- 2021 USA Water Polo Senior National Team
  - FINA WORLD LEAGUE SUPER FINAL, Tbilisi, Georgia Silver MedaL
  - 2020 (2021) Olympic Games in Tokyo, Japan, 6TH PLACE
- 2021 Hydraikos- Athens Greece
- 2023 Nautical Club of Chios - Chios Greece
- 2024 602 Coffee & Açaí at Goldenwest & Garfield

== Professional career ==
During the spring of 2021 Alex played for Hydraikos in Athens, Greece.

In January 2023, Alex began playing for Nautical Club of Chios on the island of Chios in Greece.
