= Andy Stevens (water polo) =

American water polo player (born 1987)

Personal information
- Born: Andrew Michael Stevens; December 4, 1987 (age 38) Arcadia, California
- Height: 6 ft 3 in (1.91 m)

Sport
- Country: United States
- Sport: Water Polo
- Turned pro: 2011

Andrew Michael Stevens (born December 4, 1987) is an American water polo goalkeeper. While playing at Loyola Marymount University, Los Angeles, he was a four-time All-American. Previously he played for the United States Men's National Team, and most recently competed for Team USA at the 2013 FINA World Championships.

== Career ==
=== High school ===
Stevens played water polo at Villa Park High School in Orange County from 2002 to 2005. In 2004 and 2005, he was named to the California-Hawaii All-America first team and in 2005 was also OC Registers All-Orange County Team Goalkeeper.

=== College ===
Stevens then went to Loyola Marymount University, where he redshirted the 2006 season.

In 2007, he started 28 games as goalkeeper and had a 7.8 goals against average he finished the season as Honorable Mention All-American, the Western Water Polo Association (WWPA) Newcomer of the Year including All-WWPA Honorable Mention, WWPA All-Tournament second-team and LMU Athletics' Male Newcomer of the Year.

The following year in 2008, he started 31 games, had a 7.15 goals against average, and was named to was named third-team All-American, first-team All-NCAA Tournament, the WWPA Player of the Year, first-team All-WWPA, MVP of the WWPA Tournament, first-team WWPA All-Tournament as well as LMU Male Athlete of the Year.

Stevens started 28 games in 2009. He had 321 saves and a 6.15 goals against average. Following the season, he was named Western Water Polo Association (WWPA) Player of the Year (Making him the first player in his programs history to earn back-to-back Player of The Year Honors), Third-Team All-American, First-Team WWPA All-Conference, WWPA Tournament MVP, First-Team WWPA All-Tournament, First-Team NCAA All-Tournament, LMU Male Co-Athlete of the Year.

In 2010, in his last and final collegiate season he started 29 games, made 305 saves, and had a 6.41 goals against average. His performance helped LMU reach the NCAA Championships for the fourth year in a row. In his last year he finished the season as second-team All-American, first-team All-WWPA, WWPA Tournament MVP, first-team WWPA All-Tournament, and for the third year in a row he was the only goalkeeper to be named first-team NCAA All-Tournament.

He finished his college career with 1,232 total saves, setting a school record.

=== United States National Team ===
Stevens has been a goalkeeper for the U.S. National Team since 2005 and most recently competed in the 2013 FINA World Championships, in Barcelona, Spain.

USA Men's Senior National Water Polo Team

- 2013 FINA World Championships, Barcelona, Spain
- 2013 FINA World League Super Final, Chilyabinsk, Russia
- 2013 UANA World Aquatic Championships, Calgary, Canada
- 2012 Olympic Alternate
- 2012 Pan Pacific Tournament, Melbourne, Australia
- 2011 FINA World Championships, Shanghai China
- 2011 26th World University Games, Shenzhen, China
- 2010 FINA World Cup, Oradea, Romania
- 2010 FINA World League Super Final, Nis, Serbia
- 2010 4th Volvo Cup International Tournament in Hódmezővásárhely, Hungary
- 2009 25th World University Games in Belgrade, Serbia
- 2009 3rd Volvo Cup International Tournament in Eger, Hungary

USA Junior National Team

- 2005 Six Nations Water Polo Tournament in Cosenza, Italy
- 2006 Pan American Games in Montreal, Canada 1st place
- 2007 FINA Junior World Championships in Long Beach, CA 6th place
- 2007 Low Tatras Cup in Novaky, Slovakia 2nd place,
- 2007 L.E.N. Zagreb Cup in Zagreb, Croatia 4th place

=== Professional highlights ===
Stevens previously played for Vaterpolo Klub Radnički Kragujevac located in Kragujevac, Serbia.

- 2013 LEN Cup Champion (European Champions)

== Personal ==
Stevens was born in Arcadia, California, on December 4, 1987. He is 6 feet, 3 inches tall. He resides in Orange, California.
