= Terry Schroeder =

American water polo player (born 1958)

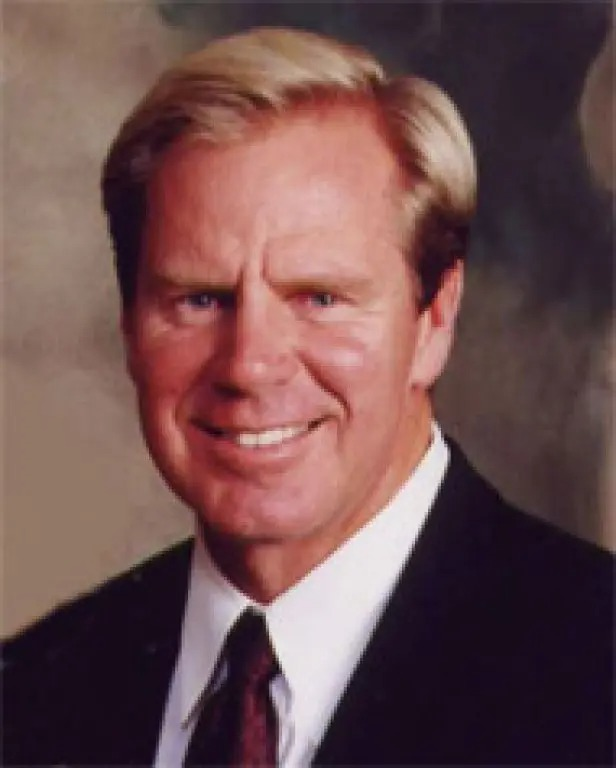

Personal information
- Full name: Terry Alan Schroeder
- Nationality: United States
- Born: October 9, 1958 (age 67) Santa Barbara, California, U.S.
- Education: Pepperdine University; Palmer College of Chiropractic West
- Occupations: Chiropractor; Water Polo Coach
- Years active: 1986–present
- Height: 6 ft 2.8 in (190 cm)
- Weight: 209 lb (95 kg)
- Spouse: Lori
Medal record
Men's water polo
Representing the United States
Olympic Games
Silver medal – second place	1984 Los Angeles	Men's water polo
Silver medal – second place	1988 Seoul	Men's water polo

Terry Alan Schroeder, DC (born October 9, 1958) is an American former water polo player who competed in the 1984 Summer Olympics, in the 1988 Summer Olympics, and in the 1992 Summer Olympics. Schroeder is a chiropractor, practicing in Agoura Hills, California. He is a 1986 graduate of Palmer Chiropractic College – West where he met his wife, Lori Schroeder. They have two daughters. He is currently the head water polo coach at Pepperdine University, and has been since 2013. He also coached at Pepperdine from 1986 to 2005, but left to become the head coach for the United States Olympic team before returning to Pepperdine.

The nude male sculpture in front of the Los Angeles Memorial Coliseum was modeled on Schroeder.

Schroeder won two consecutive silver medals at the 1984 and 1988 Olympics. He was given the honor to carry the national flag of the United States at the closing ceremony of the 1988 Summer Olympics in Seoul, becoming the 16th water polo player to be a flag bearer at the opening and closing ceremonies of the Olympics. Twenty years later, he coached the United States men's national team to a silver in 2008, becoming one of a few sportspeople who won Olympic medals in water polo as players and head coaches.

In 1999, Schroeder was inducted into the USA Water Polo Hall of Fame. In 2002, he was inducted into the International Swimming Hall of Fame.

A headless bronze statue of a nude Schroeder stands atop a post-and-lintel frame in front of the Los Angeles Memorial Coliseum, created by Robert Graham for the 1984 Summer Olympics. On the same frame, to the south of Schroeder's statue, is a statue of Jennifer Innis, a long jumper from Guyana.

== See also ==
- List of Olympic medalists in water polo (men)
- List of members of the International Swimming Hall of Fame
