= Robert Lynn (water polo) =

American water polo player (born 1967)

Personal information
- Nationality: American
- Born: February 7, 1967 (age 59) Long Beach, California, US
- Occupations: Professional WP player Swimming, WP High School Coach; National WP Team Asst. Coach
- Height: 187 cm (6 ft 2 in)
- Weight: 90 kg (198 lb)

Sport
- Sport: Water polo
- College team: Univ. Southern California (USC)
- Coached by: Rick Jones (Wilson High); John Williams (USC); John Vargas (2000 Olympics)

Robert S. Lynn (born February 7, 1967) is an American water polo player who competed for the University of Southern California, and participated in the Men's water polo tournament that placed sixth overall at the 2000 Summer Olympics in Sydney. He played professional water polo in Europe for thirteen years, coached high school water polo and swimming, and served as an Assistant water polo coach to the US Men's National team.

== Early life ==
Lynn was born in Long Beach, California, on February 7, 1967, and first started playing water polo at age six at the Belmont Plaza pool in Long Beach. Graduating in 1985, he attended and played water polo for the traditionally strong program at Wilson High School in Long Beach under the strong training and coaching of Rick Jones. Jones had a thirty year career at Wilson where he began coaching water polo in 1978, winning league titles in every year but one, while serving as a Vice-President of US Water Polo from 1984-1990.

Lynn was named All-American in each of his High School years, and was a CIF Player of the Year. In 1985, Lynn received honors as an All-Southern California Water Polo 4A Division Player of the Year.

=== University of Southern California ===
Lynn attended the University of Southern California, from around 1985-1989, where he was coached in varsity water polo by Coach John Williams, a USA water polo Hall of Fame inductee, and former player for UC Irvine. At USC, Lynn earned NCAA All American honors, and held USC's scoring record for 20 years before it was broken. In 1987, during his tenure with the team, USC placed second in the NCAA championships at Long Beach's Belmont Plaza Pool against the University of California by a score of 9-8 in overtime.

=== Post-collegiate competition ===
Around the time he was ending his college career, Lynn became a member of the U.S. Men's National Water polo Team in 1989 and remained through 2001. In international competition, he competed with the U.S. National team at the 1999 and 1991 Pan American championships. He captured the gold medal at the 1999 Pan Ams with the US National Team, and at the 1991 Pan Ams in La Habana, (Havana), Cuba played with the US National team that took the team silver medal.

Subsequent to his collegiate years, he played professional water polo for a total of thirteen years in Italy, Croatia, France and Greece.

== 2000 Sydney Olympics ==
Lynn played in the 2000 Sydney Summer Olympics, under Olympic Coach John Vargas in the 2000 Sydney Olympics, where he helped to lead the team to an overall sixth-place finish among twelve competing countries. In preliminary rounds, the US team defeated the Netherlands and Croatia, both traditionally strong teams, but lost their last match in the final round 10–8 to Italy. Perennial pre-game favorite Hungary took the gold medal, Russia took the silver, and the historically dominant team from Yugoslavia took the bronze, having had more total goals than the United States. Hungary easily defeated rival Russia in the final game by a score of 13-6, leading in each of the first three periods by a score of 3-1, 8-2, and 10-4.

== Coaching career ==
In 2006 and 2007, he was named head coach of USA Water Polo's Youth National Team. In 2007, he served as an assistant coach of the USA Men's Olympic Water Polo Team, as well as head coach for his alma mater Long Beach Wilson High School boys' swimming, and Marina High School water polo. Lynn helped coach the USA Olympic team in 2008 and 2012.

Lynn worked as the water polo coach for Newport Harbor High School from 2011-2014 where he twice led the team to Division I CIF semi-finals, and consecutive titles in the Sunset League. In 2014, Lynn was subsequently hired as the boys and girls water polo coach at Chadwick School in Palos Verdes, California where he continued to coach through at least 2026.
