= Christopher Segesman =

American water polo player (born 1979)

Personal information
- Full name: Christopher Roberts Segesman
- Nickname: "Chris"
- Nationality: United States
- Born: 17 June 1979 (age 47) Santa Barbara, California, U.S.
- Education: Concordia University (MA, 2007)
- Occupations: Water Polo Coach; Real Estate Development
- Height: 1.93 m (6 ft 4 in)
- Weight: 92 kg (203 lb)
- Spouse: Heather Mears (2003)
- Children: 3 daughters

Sport
- Sport: Water Polo
- Position: Center back
- College team: Long Beach State (2002)
- Club: Los Angeles Water Polo Club
- Coached by: Jim Ranta (Dos Pueblos High); Ricardo Azevedo (Long Beach State); Ratko Rudić (Olympics)

Christopher "Chris" Roberts Segesman (born 17 June 1979) is former American male water polo player who competed for Long Beach State, and played with the United States men's national water polo team, as a center back. He was part of the US team at the Olympic men's water polo tournament at the 2004 Athens Olympics. He later coached water polo for Mater Dei High School's Men's and Women's water polo teams from 2005 to 2017.

Segesman was born June 17, 1979 in Santa Barbara, California. From 1994 to 1997, he attended Santa Barbara's Dos Pueblos High School where he played water polo under Head Coach Jim Ranta. As a Senior, he helped lead Dos Pueblos to a three-way tie for the Channel League Championship, and had 128 season goals, with 72 steals and 42 assists. In 1996, he was named the Channel League's Most Valuable Player. In club play he competed for the Los Angeles Water Polo Club.

== Cal State Long Beach ==
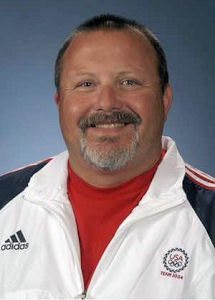
LBS Coach Azevedo

Segesman attended Long Beach State (LBS), where he played water polo from 1997 to 2002 under Ricardo Azevedo, a 1976 Water Polo Olympian for Brazil, and a USA Water Polo Hall of Fame inductee. Azevedo coached California State Long Beach Water Polo from 1999 to 2005, where he amassed a record of 107-96.

Segesman received All-American honors at Long Beach State in water polo in three years, and received the distinguished honor of being named a finalist for the Peter J. Cutino Award, presented to the year's top male collegiate water polo player. Completing his BA for Long Beach State, he minored in kinesiology, while majoring in human development.

Part of the US National team from around 2002-2004, in international competition, Segesman was with the US National team that won a team gold medal at the Pan American Games in Santo Domingo in 2003.

== Concordia University ==
While attending Concordia University in Montreal, Quebec in 2007, he earned a Master's in Athletic Administration and Coaching.

== 2004 Athens Olympics ==
He was part of the US team at the Olympic men's water polo tournament at the 2004 Athens Olympics under Head Coach Ratko Rudić, where the men's team placed seventh overall. Segesman's former coach Ricardo Azevedo's son Tony Azevedo, who was a valuable 2004 Olympic team member, was second on the 2004 Olympic tournament's total goals scored list with 15. Pre-Olympic favorites Hungary and the combined team from Serbia and Montenegro (formerly Yugoslavia) met in the finals, with Hungary winning a close game that went back and forth until the fourth quarter when Hungary scored three goals to win the final 8-7. Pre-Olympic favorites Hungary took the gold as they had in 2000, Serbia and Montenegro took the silver, and the Russian Federation took the bronze.

He married wife Heather Mears, a teacher from Long Beach, in September 2003. The couple had three daughters.

=== Post competition careers ===
Segesman later coached Santa Ana's private co-educational Catholic Mater Dei High School Women's and Men's Water Polo for twelve seasons from 2005 to 2017. At Mater Dei High, he led the Boy's team to California Interscholastic Federation Southern Section Championships in seven years over a ten-year period, and was the Boy's CIF Southern Section Coach of the Year in five seasons. He led the Mater Dei women's team for 3 years as runner-up finishers in the CIF Southern Section. While at Mater Dei, he received honors as the 2009 Orange County Boys Water Polo Coach of the Year, and the 2011 Southern California Fall Coach of the Year. Segesman returned to coach youth water polo for the SOCAL Water Polo Foundation in 2021 for their youth teams. In 2023, he briefly coached the women's teams at Mater Dei High School.

As a primary career, Segesman has worked for an Orange County real estate residential development company. His primary experience in real estate includes serving as a Project Manager for Bonanni Development after 2018, where he oversaw community residential projects. He has served as a Head Coach for the Regency Water Polo Club from around 2023 through at least 2025.

=== Honors ===
He became a member of the Santa Barbara Athletic Round Table Hall of Fame in 2012, and earned CIF Southern Section Hall of Fame Honors for his role as a water polo player and Coach in 2022.
