= Bill Barnett (water polo) =

American water polo coach (born 1942)

William Robert Barnett
- Barnett during his coaching career

Biographical details
- Born: August 31, 1942; Los Angeles, California
- Died: December 24, 2018 (aged 76); Laguna Beach, California

Playing career
- 1957-1960: El Rancho High School
- 1961-1963: Fullerton Community College; Played for Coach James R. Smith
- 1963-1965: Long Beach State; Played for Coach Bob Horn
- 1963-1966: Inland Nu-Pike WP Club; Coached by B. Horn, M. Nitzkowski

Coaching career (HC unless noted)
- 1966-2015: Newport Harbor High School
- 1967-2000: Newport Water Polo Foundation
- 1976-1982: U.S. National Junior Team
- 1985-1992: U.S. Senior National Team (Olympic Coach 1988-1992)

Accomplishments and honors

Championships
- 15 Southern Section CIF Championships (Newport Harbor High)

Awards
- CIF Coach of the Year '68, '70, '75, '77, '78; Water Polo Hall of Fame

William "Bill" Robert Barnett (August 31, 1942 – December 24, 2018) was an American water polo coach who competed for Long Beach State and was best known for leading the U.S. men's Olympic water polo team to a silver medal at the 1988 Summer Olympics in Seoul, Korea and to a fourth place finish at the 1992 Summer Olympics in Barcelona. As of 2026, he was one of only two U.S. Olympic men's water polo coaches to lead the U.S team to two consecutive top four finishes in the Olympic games. While serving in his primary career as a coach at Newport Harbor High School from 1966-2015, he led the Sailor's Water Polo teams to ten boys championships and five girl's championships in the Southern Section of the California Interscholastic Federation (CIF).

== Early life ==
Barnett was born August 31, 1942, in greater Los Angeles, an only child to mother Gladys, a Junior High math teacher and Whittier High School swimmer, and father Earl, a Los Angeles District High School principal. The family resided on South Passons Boulevard in the Los Angeles suburb of Pico Rivera. With an inborn respect for education and achievement, he attended El Rancho High School in Pico Rivera, California, graduating in the summer of 1960. He played water polo for the El Rancho's "B" team in 1957 as a Freshman under Coach Ken Cates, and continued as a standout in both water polo and swimming through his Senior year. At the Whittier District Championship in April, 1960, competing for swim coach Bill Sexton, Barnett tied the Class A record in the 100-yard backstroke with a time of 1:05.9, and later lowered his time to 1:03.8 at the CIF Finals the following month.

== College water polo ==
=== Fullerton College ===
After High School, Barnett enrolled at Fullerton Community College attending from 1960-1963. At Fullerton College, he was managed and trained in water polo by accomplished coach Jimmy Smith, a member of the Water Polo Hall of Fame who won five national titles during his 30 year tenure as a Water Polo Coach and athletic director at Fullerton. Known as the "Father of Water Polo", Smith modified the design of the water polo ball, making it smaller, lighter and denser to improve the handling, passing, and accuracy of shots on goal. Smith had formerly coached Monte Nitzkowski at Fullerton College. Nitzkowski would later mentor Barnett, and serve as an Olympic Coach. While playing water polo for Fullerton Junior College in 1961, Barnett was named a second team All-Southern California Junior College water polo honoree.

=== Long Beach State ===
Barnett transferred to Long Beach State University (LBSU), where he played water polo from 1963-1965. At Long Beach State, his team won the California Collegiate Athletic Association (CCAA) championship in the 1963 season, while under the coaching of Water Polo Hall of fame honoree Bob Horn. That year Barnett was an honorable mention honoree on the CCAA All-League team. Graduating Long Beach State in 1965 with a degree in Physical Education, he lettered and competed in both swimming and water polo. Long Beach State water polo Coach Robert "Bob" Horn would later leave Long Beach State to begin a highly accomplished career as a UCLA coach in 1965.

While at Long Beach State, Barnett played for club team, Nu-Pike Water Polo, coached by future Olympic Coach Monte Nitzkowski. Nitzkowski would have a long career coaching at Long Beach City College, where he was available to coach Barnett while Barnett attended Long Beach State. Barnett credited Nitzkowski with greatly improving his knowledge of water polo tactics and strategy. At Club Nu-Bike, Barnett was also likely coached by Bob Horn, as Horn led the team to Outdoor water polo championships in 1963 and 1968.

== Coaching ==
Barnett was a graduate Assistant Coach in swimming at Long Beach State before beginning his High School coaching career.

Shortly after college graduation, following his parent's example, Barnett began his professional career as a teacher at Newport Harbor High School around 1966. He coached boys water polo at Newport High from 1966-2015, and the girls water polo team from 1996-2015. During his coaching tenure at Newport Harbor High, he won 15 Southern Section Girls' Championships, with included 10 for the boy's teams and five for the girls' teams. With consistent records of high level play, Barnett coached 11 successive Newport Harbor teams to the CIF finals. Recognized for his achievements at Newport High, he was voted a Coach of the year for the California Interscholastic Federation in 1968, 1970, 1975, 1977, and 1978. Beginning in 1967, Barnett also coached the Newport Water Polo Foundation, a highly competitive age-group club program where he co-coached with UC Irvine Collegiate Coach Ted Newland. Barnett credited Newland with teaching him the importance of a strong work ethic.

=== Outstanding players coached ===
Some of the better known players he coached in age-group competition at Newport Harbor High School who became Olympians included James Bergeson, Kaleigh Gilchrist, Eric Lindroth and Kevin Robertson, and he coached non-Olympians Frank Anderson and Mike Grier.

According to water polo referee, Terry Sayring, like most accomplished coaches, Barnett's coaching style was considered somewhat demanding and strict, though he retained a sense of humor. He trained his players to a strong defense that pressed opponents and could quickly move to counterattacks on offense.

== Olympic coaching and management ==
Barnett had a long career coaching the U.S. Senior Men and U.S. Junior National teams, which he managed while remaining as a Head Coach at Newport Harbor High School. From 1996-2004, he Chaired the Men’s International Olympic Committee for USA Water Polo, where he was in charge of the National program. Prior to taking over the Men’s National Team, from 1976-1982 Barnett managed the U.S. National Junior Team, leading them to a number of championships. From 1997-1998, Barnett helped author manuals that helped unify playing rules for all levels of United States Water Polo competition.

== U.S. Senior National team coach ==
Barnett coached the U.S. National men's water polo team from 1985-1992.

=== 1988 Seoul Olympic silver medal coach ===
In the accomplishment for which he became best known, he led the U.S. Men's water polo team to a silver medal at the 1988 Summer Olympics in Seoul, Korea. Pre-Olympic favorite Yugoslavia and the U.S. team were part of group play in their first Olympic match, where the U.S. team bettered Yugoslavia 7-6. But Yugoslavia performed better in the remaining rounds of group play, with the U.S. team recording a loss to the team from Spain in a score of 9-7. With more overall goals, the Yugoslavian and U.S. teams both advanced to the semi-final rounds, where they each won their first match and were later paired in the final match for the gold medal. The U.S. final match with Yugoslavia was tied 6-6 in regular play, but in overtime Yugoslavia took a 9-6 lead making the first three goals, and later won the gold medal with a 9-7 overtime win under Head Coach Ratko Rudic. The team from the Soviet Union took the bronze, and the West German team placed fourth. Members of the 1988 Olympic water polo team included goalie Craig Wilson, Jody Campbell, Peter Campbell, Kevin Robertson, and Douglas Kimbell, who were returning members from the 1984 Olympic water polo team.

=== 1992 Barcelona Olympic coach ===
He led the U.S. Olympic team to a fourth-place finish at the 1992 Summer Olympics in Barcelona.

=== International meets coached ===
During his tenure as National team coach, in non-Olympic international competition he led the National team to a first-place gold medal at the 1987 Pan American Games, and to a second place silver medal at the Pan American Games in 1991. In World Championship competition, he led the U.S. National team to a fourth-place finish in 1986, and another fourth place finish in 1991. He coached the U.S. National team at the FINA Cup competition in 1985, 1987, 1991, and 1987. In 1991, he led the U.S. National team to a FINA World Cup Championship.

He retired from coaching water polo at Newport Harbor High School in 2015.

Barnett died at the age of 76 on December 24, 2018 of leukemia at his home in Laguna Beach, California. He was survived by his wife Marcia and two children.

=== Honors ===
Barnett became a member of the USA Water Polo Hall of Fame in 2000. An annual award for distinguished coaching bearing his name was created by USA Water Polo to honor his achievements. He became a member of the Long Beach State Hall of Fame in 2005.
