= Peter Hudnut =

American water polo player

Personal information
- Born: February 16, 1980 (age 46) Washington D.C.
- Occupations: Business Management; Real Estate Development
- Height: 196 cm (6 ft 5 in)
- Weight: 105 kg (231 lb)

Sport
- Sport: Water Polo
- Position: Center Forward, 2-meter position (WP)
- College team: Stanford University
- Coached by: Richard Corso (Harvard-Westlake); Dante Dettamanti (Stanford); Terry Schroeder (08 Olympics)
Medal record
Men's water polo
Representing the United States
Olympic Games
Silver medal – second place	2008 Beijing	Team
Pan American Games
Gold medal – first place	2011 Guadalajara	Team

Peter Hudnut (born February 16, 1980) is an American water polo player who competed for Stanford University. He was a member of the United States men's national water polo team at the 2008 Beijing Olympics. He later coached high school and collegiate water polo and after receiving an MBA from Stanford, worked in the field of Real Estate development in Los Angeles. In the championship game, the USA team won the silver medal, defeated by Hungary.

Hudnut was born February 16, 1980 in Washington D.C, and attended John Thomas Dye Elementary school in Los Angeles. At Los Angeles's Harvard-Westlake School, he first began playing water polo in seventh grade, where he was mentored and managed by Hall of Fame Coach Richard Corso, who would serve as an Olympic coach in 1996. At Harvard-Westlake, he received All-American honors in three years, and as a Senior, he qualified to compete with the U.S. Junior National team. With his strength, height, and physical presence, he has played water polo center forward, or the 2-meter position, which lines up directly in the center of the goal.

== Stanford University ==
Hudnut attended Stanford University, where he was managed and trained by Coach Dante Dettamanti who led Cardinal men's water polo to eight NCAA championships from 1977-2001. At Stanford, Hudnut was an All American in three years, and played on NCAA Championship teams in both 2001 and 2002. He earned an MBA from Stanford University's Graduate School of Business in 2011.

== Olympics ==
After suffering an injury to a vertebra in 2003, Hudnut was selected as a 2004 U.S. Olympic water polo team alternate.

After he return to elite competition, he participated in the 2008 Beijing Olympics, in the men's water polo team competition under Head Coach Terry Schroeder, where he was instrumental in leading the U.S. team to the silver medal. Hungary took the gold medal and Serbia took the bronze. At the Beijing water polo semi-finals, Hungary, a pre-Olympic favorite, beat Montenegro 11-9, and the U.S. team, in the other semi-final, had an unexpected victory over the strong men's team from Serbia, with a score of 10-5. For the first three quarters in the final gold and silver medal match between Hungary and the U.S., both teams stayed close, though Hungary held a 9-8 halftime lead. Scoring in the opening of the third quarter, the U.S. team tied the score at 9-9, but Hungary surged ahead with five unanswered goals, winning the gold medal by a score of 14-10, despite the U.S. team making one last goal.

Hudnut later participated in the 2012 London Olympics, where the U.S. water polo team placed eighth with Croatia taking the gold medal, Italy taking the silver, and Serbia taking the bronze.

In international water polo competition, at the 2007 Pan American games in Rio de Janeiro, he won a gold medal with the U.S. team, and won another gold medal in the 2011 Pan American games in Guadalajara.

== Career pursuits ==
=== Coaching ===
In professional water polo, he played for Spain's Barcelona team and for Rome's S.S. Lazio Nuoto in the A-1 Italian League in 2004-06. From 2003-2006, he coached part-time for his alma mater Harvard-Westlake. In 2006, he was a volunteer Assistant Coach for the UCLA women's water polo team.

=== Business management ===
Recovering from his 2003 back injury required many months of therapy, but also gave him time to gain work experience. Hudnut has worked for the CIM Group, Bank of New York Melon, and the Los Angeles Real Estate development company Ratkovich Corporation. After the 2012 Olympics, he had planned to work for Goldman-Sachs after a series of successful interviews. In other careers, he has worked in real estate development in Los Angeles.

== See also ==
- List of Olympic medalists in water polo (men)
