= John Mann (water polo) =

American water polo player (born 1985)

Personal information
- Born: June 27, 1985 (age 41) Beverly Hills, California
- Height: 6 ft 6 in (1.98 m)
- Weight: 250 lb (110 kg)

Sport
- Country: United States
- Sport: Water Polo
- Turned pro: 2009
Medal record
Representing United States
Pan American Games
Gold medal – first place	2007 Rio de Janeiro	Team competition
Gold medal – first place	2015 Toronto	Team competition

John Mann (born June 27, 1985) is an American water polo player. He led the University of California team to the 2006 NCAA Championship, and he played for the United States national team at the 2012 Summer Olympics.

== Career ==
=== High school ===
Mann played on the water polo team at Corona del Mar High School and won three C.I.F. titles. Starting his sophomore season, Mann began to rapidly develop as a top youth player in the country and was selected to train with the United States Olympic team shortly after his Sophomore year at Corona del Mar High. Mann attributes his growth during this time to the flexibility of his teachers and administrators allowing him to attend daily practice with the National Team at the Los Alamitos Joint training facility between 7-10 a.m. and 5-9 p.m. practice. Fortunately, Mann was able to balance the responsibilities of both school and sport through this time. Throughout his career at CdM, Mann was named Orange County player of the year multiple times. While at CdM Mann was a three-time First team All-America and was known for his goals scoring ability both in the center and on the perimeter, as a senior, he scored 109 goals and was named the Orange County Player of the Year despite missing the first month of the season due to an injury sustained in international competition in Russia. M

=== College ===
Mann then joined the University of California, Berkeley team. He scored 22 goals as a freshman in 2003. As a sophomore, he led the Bears with 60 goals, was named the team MVP, and was also a first team All-American. The following season, he scored 56 goals to lead the team again. He repeated as team MVP and was again named to the All-America first team.

In 2006, Mann scored a team-leading 80 goals and led California to the NCAA Championship. He was a first team All-American for the third straight year and also won the Peter J. Cutino Award as the nation's best male collegiate water polo player. He finished his college career with 218 goals, the second-most in school history.

=== International ===
During his career with U.S., Mann appeared in over 350 Matches. He served as Team Captain between 2013 and 2015. Water polo captaincy is a rare distinction for a Center player (position) due to the constant physical contact and nature that the position requires. Typically, a perimeter player is earns the title of captain at the elite level. From 2001 to 2016 Mann represented the United States in; 2 Olympics (London, Rio), 3 Pan- American Games, and appeared in multiple Fina World championship, Fina World Cups, and Fina World League competitions.

=== Professional ===
Mann played for 5 professional clubs throughout his Professional career. Esporte Clube Pinhieros(São Paulo, Brazil), C.N. Barceloneta (Barcelona, Spain), R.N. Nervi (Genoa, Italy), V.K. Red Star (Belgrade, Serbia) and C.N. Marseilles (Marseilles, France).

Incredibly, Mann became the League champion, League Cup Champion, and Super Cup Champion of each the Brazilian, Spanish, French, and Serbian Leagues. This success further solidified Mann as one of the most accomplished and sought after U.S. players in the International Professional league system. He represented C.N. Barceloneta (Barcelona, Spain), V.K. Red Star (Belgrade, Serbia) and C.N. Marseilles (Marseilles, France) in Champions League. In 2013, he won the European Super Cup which is a game played between the two best teams in all of the European league systems.

== Personal ==
Mann was born in Beverly Hills, California, on June 27, 1985. His father played football at Purdue.
