= Layne Beaubien =

American water polo player (born 1976)

Personal information
- Full name: Ronald Layne Beaubien
- Born: July 4, 1976 (age 50) Coronado, California, U.S.
- Height: 198 cm (6 ft 6 in)
- Weight: 100 kg (220 lb)

Sport
- Sport: Water Polo
- Position: Center Defender (WP) (Set Guard, Hole Defender)
- College team: Stanford University
- Club: New York Athletic Club
- Coached by: Dante Dettamanti (Stanford)
Medal record
Men's water polo
Representing the United States
Olympic Games
| Silver medal – second place | 2008 Beijing | Team |
Pan American Games
| Gold medal – first place | 2011 Guadalajara | Team |

Ronald Layne Beaubien (born July 4, 1976) is an American water polo player. He was a member of the United States men's national water polo team at the 2008 Beijing Olympics, that won a silver medal in the final championship game, losing to the team from Hungary that won the gold.

Beaubien was born July 4, 1976 in Coronado, California and attended Coronado High School, graduating in the class of 1994. At Coronado High, in 1993 he was honored as the CIF Player of the year.

== Stanford University ==
Graduating in 1999 with a major in History, Beaubien attended Stanford University where he was an All-American in 1997 and 1998 and was trained and mentored by Head Coach Dante Dettamanti. A long-serving coach, Dettamanti managed water polo at Stanford from 1977-2001. Under Dettamanti's training and direction, Beaubien helped lead the team to the NCAA national championship in 1994. While playing water polo for Stanford, Beaubien was the 1998 Player of the Year in the Mountain Pacific Sports Federation (MPSF).

== 2004-2012 Olympics ==
Beaubien competed in the 2004 Athens Olympics where the U.S. team tied for seventh place overall, Hungary took the gold, Serbia and Montenegro the silver, and the Russian Federation took the bronze.

He participated in the Beijing 2008 Olympics in the men's water polo team competition where the U.S. team won the silver medal. Hungary took the gold medal and Serbia took the bronze. The medal was the first for the U.S. in water polo after a 20 year drought.

He later competed in the 2012 Olympics, where the U.S. placed eighth overall, Croatia took the gold medal, Italy took the silver, and Serbia took the bronze.

=== International highlights ===
Considered to be one of the world's most talented players on both offense and defense, Beaubien boasted one of the strongest shooting arms on Team USA for over a decade. During his 15-year career he competed in three Summer Olympic Games, five World Championships (Fukuoka '01, Barcelona '03, Melbourne '07, Rome '09, Shanghai '11), and played in the professional leagues of Hungary, Greece, France, and Brazil. In 2008 he became the first American in the sports history to win National Club Championships on three continents, which included a championship with the New York Athletic Club in the U.S. in 2005, the Fluminense team in Brazil in 2006, and team Marseille, in France in 2008. In 1999, he played for the Hungarian team KSI, as one of the few Americans to represent a Hungarian team.

In addition to winning the silver medal at the 2008 Olympic Games, Beaubien is a three-time Pan-American Gold medalist, in Santo Domingo 2003, Rio de Janeiro 2007, and Guadalajara in 2011.

=== Coaching ===
In 2013 and 2015, he served as an assistant coach for UCLA's USA representative at The World University Games, where he was instrumental in leading the American team to a bronze medal at the 2015 Games in Gwangju. He has coached clinics and helped in the support of the U.S. National team.

=== Honors ===
Beaubien was inducted into the USA Water Polo Hall of Fame in August 2022. He was also a New York Athletic Club honoree.

== See also ==
- List of Olympic medalists in water polo (men)
