= John Vargas (water polo) =

American water polo player (born 1961)

Personal information
- Full name: John D. Vargas
- Born: June 17, 1961 (age 65) Fullerton, California, United States
- Occupations: Water Polo Coach * Corona del Mar High (1984-2001) * Stanford University (2002-2021)
- Height: 178 cm (5 ft 10 in)
- Weight: 70 kg (154 lb)
- Spouse: Dawn

Sport
- Sport: Water Polo
- College team: University of California Irvine (UCI)
- Coached by: Ted Newland (UCI)

John Vargas (born June 17, 1961) is an American water polo player who competed for the University of California Irvine. He participated in the men's water polo tournament at the 1992 Summer Olympics in Barcelona where the U.S. team placed fourth in competition. He later coached water polo at Corona del Mar High School, and had a highly successful twenty year career as the Head water polo Coach at Stanford University. Vargas coached the US National Water Polo team beginning around 1995, and was part of the coaching staff at the 2000 Olympic Games in Sydney.

Vargas was born on June 17, 1961, in Fullerton, California. He was the oldest of three brothers, who included Joseph Vargas and Chris Vargas, who excelled in the sport of water polo. He attended Los Altos High School in Hacienda Heights where he was an outstanding player on their water polo team, as would later be his brother Joe.

== University of California Irvine ==
Vargas attended and played water polo for the University of California Irvine Anteaters where he was managed and trained by Hall of Fame and long serving UCI Coach Ted Newland. At UCI, Vargas helped lead the team to the 1982 NCAA National Championship, and was the recipient of All American honors in two years.

== 1992 Barcelona Olympics ==
He participated in the men's water polo tournament at the 1992 Summer Olympics in Barcelona where the U.S. team placed fourth in competition.

Yugoslavia was the world's leading team prior to the Olympics, but was banned from play by the International Olympic Committee due to a United Nations sanction for the Bosnian and Croatian war. After preliminary rounds, the U.S. team and the Unified Team made it to the semi-finals for Group A, with Italy and Spain advancing for Group B. In semi-final play, Italy outscored the Unified Team with a 9-8 victory, and Spain beat the U.S. team 6-4. In preliminary pool games Italy and Spain had formerly tied 9-9.

The final was one of the longest games in the history of the Olympics. Tied at 7-7 at the end of regular play, the game stayed tied through two overtimes. In the second overtime, Spain scored on a penalty with under a minute remaining on the clock, which seemed to give Spain the gold medal. But with a half a minute remaining, Italy scored to tie the game. Spain and Italy played two additional overtimes, with no score. In the sixth overtime, Italy scored with half a minute remaining, and Italy took the gold medal, with Spain taking the silver, and the Unified Team taking the bronze.

== Coaching ==
After college graduation, Vargas coached water polo at Corona del Mar High School from 1984-2001. While still at Corona del Mar, he served as an assistant coach for the U.S. National team in preparation for the 1996 Atlanta Olympics, and ascended to the role of Head Olympic coach at the 2000 Olympics in Sydney, Australia. At Corona del Mar, Vargas led the team to seven California Interscholastic Federation titles.

He became the Coach at Stanford University in 2002, where in his first year he led the team to a National NCAA team championship, and to five Championship Games at the NCAA within his first ten coaching seasons. He won a second NCAA title coaching Stanford in 2019, and won five Mountain Pacific Federation Conference titles before retiring in 2021. During his time coaching the varsity teams at Stanford, he was credited with 389 wins and 117 losses, for a winning games percentage of around 77 percent. He also coached Stanford's Water Polo Foundation team to men's open water titles in two years. His varsity players Tony Azevedo and Ben Hallock were recipients of the Peter J. Cutino Award given to the top water polo player of the year with Azevedo receiving the award all four of his years at Stanford. Alex Bowen was the first of his players to be the recipient of First Team All-American honors for all four years of his collegiate career.
