= Tony Azevedo =

American water polo player (born 1981)

Personal information
- Full name: Anthony Lawrence Azevedo
- Nickname: The Savior
- Nationality: American/Brazilian
- Born: November 21, 1981 (age 44) Rio de Janeiro, Brazil
- Occupations: Pro Water Polo, Coaching
- Height: 186 cm (6 ft 1 in)
- Weight: 90 kg (198 lb)
- Spouse: Sarah

Sport
- Sport: Water Polo
- Position: Driver (Usually)
- College team: Stanford University
- Club: Shore Aquatics (After 1998); New York Athletic Club
- Coached by: Ricardo Azevedo (Wilson High); John Vargas (Stanford, Olympics); Terry Schroeder (08-12 Olympics)
Medal record
Men's water polo
Representing the United States
Olympic Games
Silver medal – second place	2008 Beijing	Team
Pan American Games
Gold medal – first place	1999 Winnipeg	Team
Gold medal – first place	2003 Santo Domingo	Team
Gold medal – first place	2007 Rio de Janeiro	Team
Gold medal – first place	2011 Guadalajara	Team
Gold medal – first place	2015 Toronto	Team
FINA World League
Silver medal – second place	2016 Huizhou	Team
Bronze medal – third place	2003 New York	Team

Anthony Lawrence Azevedo (born November 21, 1981) is a Brazilian-American water polo player who competed for Stanford University. He is a 2008 Olympic silver medalist and a five-time Olympian, which included the Olympic years 2000, 2004, 2008, 2012, and 2016. Azevedo has ranked fourth on the all-time scoring list in Olympic history, with 61 goals. A four-time recipient of the Peter J. Cutino award for the best collegiate water polo player of the year, and a three-time captain of the U.S. National Men's Water Polo Olympic Team, he is considered to be one of the best all-time American Olympic water polo players. After his collegiate years, he had a long career as a water polo professional in Europe playing for teams in Italy, Montenegro, Croatia, and Brazil, and retired from the U.S. national team in June 2017. In 2020, he worked as a podcast co-announcer for the "Tony Azevedo Show", and is a co-founder of 6-8 Sports, which includes an age-group water polo program and an online application that stores member's performance statistics.

== Early life ==
Tony Azevedo was born November 21, 1981 in Rio de Janeiro, but his family moved to California when he was 1 month old. His mother Libby is American, and his father is the Brazilian-born Ricardo Azevedo, a former Olympic water polo player, and an accomplished high school, collegiate, and assistant U.S. Olympic coach. When he was four, Tony suffered a fall that severed his trachea and esophagus. Although his heart stopped beating on the operating table for a period of four minutes before doctors were able to revive him, he made a complete recovery and went on to excel in water polo, a strenuous sport. By age eight, Tony began to play water polo, deciding to make it his primary sport by eleven, and in his early years of play, his father Ricardo served as an occasional coach and frequent mentor.

During his four years at Wilson Classical High School in Long Beach, California, where he was coached through his Junior year by his father Ricardo, his team won four California Interscholastic Federation championships and he was named MVP all four years. In his Senior year, Azevedo was coached by Tony Martinho, when his father Ricardo left Wilson High in February 1999 to coach water polo at Long Beach State. Having already played with the U.S. national team, Tony graduated Wilson High in January, 2000, and began immediately to train for the U.S. Olympic team.

In club water polo, beginning around his late college years, Azevedo played for Shore Aquatics in Long Beach, and later with the New York Athletic Club where he helped lead the team to a few national championships.

== Stanford University ==
Cutino Award trophy

Azevedo led Stanford's men's water polo team to two NCAA championships in 2001 and 2002, under Head Coach John Vargas. An athlete with both strength, speed, and height, he was 1.85 m (6 ft) in height and weighed 91 kg (200 lbs) during much of his career, and favored the driver position, which lined up around the ends of the goal post, in both college and Olympic play. His father and high school coach, Ricardo Azevedo, was known for developing perimeter shooters, a primary shooting position for water polo drivers.

By the end of his Senior year, Azevedo had set a Stanford career scoring record with a total of 252 goals. He set a Stanford school freshman scoring record of 68 goals, and a single-season record as a sophomore of 95, or 3.4 goals a game. In a rare distinction, in each of his four years in college, he was honored as the most outstanding male player of the year with the Peter J. Cutino Award – water polo's version of the Heisman Trophy. During his collegiate career, he was honored as the Men’s Water Polo Player of the Century for the Pac-12 Conference. He was a member of the Alpha Pi chapter of the Kappa Alpha Order at Stanford.

== Five Olympics ==
=== 2000 Sydney Olympics ===
He represented the United States as the youngest member of the team at the 2000 Summer Olympics in Sydney where the U.S. team placed sixth under Head Coach John Vargas, his coach at Stanford. Pre-Olympic favorites Hungary took the gold medal, the Russian Federation took the silver, and a strong team from Yugoslavia took the bronze. After the 2000 Olympics, Azevedo was chosen by world-wide journalists to become a member of an All-world water polo team. The 2000 semi-final games were close matches, with Hungary beating Serbia/Montenegro by 8-7, and Russia defeating Spain by the same score. In the final game between Hungary and Russia, Hungary led after each of the first three quarter by scores of 3-1, 8-2, and 10-4. Hungary won by the end of play with a final score of 13-6, taking their first gold medal since the 1976 games Montréal. As noted, Russia took the silver.

=== 2004 Athens Olympics ===
Four years later, he participated with the U.S. team at the 2004 Summer Olympics in Athens under Head Coach Ratko Rudić, where the men's water polo team placed seventh overall. A valuable member of the team, Azevedo was second on the tournament's goals scored list with 15. Pre-Olympic favorites Hungary took the gold as they had in 2000, Serbia and Montenegro took the silver, and the Russian Federation took the bronze.

=== 2008 Beijing silver medal ===
He participated as Captain in the 2008 Summer Olympics under Head Olympic Coach Terry Schroeder, where the U.S. team won the silver medal in the Men's Olympic water polo competition. Pre-Olympic favorites Hungary won the gold, and Serbia won the bronze. Azevedo scored 5 goals in an 8–4 win by the US National Team over host country China in the opening games of the 2008 Olympics. As noted, in the final championship game, the U.S. team won the silver medal, but were defeated by Hungary.

=== 2012 London Olympics ===
Serving again as Captain of the United States men's national water polo team at the 2012 Summer Olympics, he was again managed by Head Olympic Coach Terry Schroeder. Near the end of the contest against Romania on July 31, 2012, he was called for a misconduct foul and was given a red card. The USA team defeated Romania 10–8, but consequently missed the elimination round due to score differential. The U.S. team finished eighth overall, with pre-Olympic favorites Croatia taking the gold, Italy taking the silver, and pre-Olympic favorite Serbia taking the bronze. In the final game between Italy and Croatia, Italy began with a 2-0 lead, but Croatia had a 3-2 lead at halftime. Though Italy tied the game 3-3 in the third quarter, Croatia scored four straight and unanswered goals to take a 7-3 lead, and put the match away, though Italy scored again. Serbia defeated Montenegro for the bronze by a close score of 12-11.

=== 2016 Rio de Janeiro Olympics ===
Azevedo's last Olympic participation with the U.S. men's Olympic water polo team was at the 2016 Summer Olympics, at Rio de Janeiro, his birthplace, where the U.S. team was trained by Head Olympic Coach Dejan Udovičić and finished tenth overall. Serbia took the gold, Croatia took the silver, and Italy took the bronze.

== International career highlights ==
Azevedo played for the U.S. National team from around 1998-2017. In a summation of his non-Olympic career with the U.S. team, in the Pan-American games he won five gold medals between 1999-2015, and won two silver medals in FINA World League Super Final games. In June, 2017, after a 27-year career as a player, Azevedo retired from competing with the U.S. national team in international competition in a game against Croatia at his alma mater Stanford University.

== Professional career ==
In 2004 after graduating from Stanford University with a degree in International Relations, Azevedo signed a professional water polo contract with Bissolati Cremona (Italy) placing him among the top 10 paid players in the sport. Playing with Team Bissolati for his third season in 2006, he scored 63 goals with a 2.62 average per game. Azevedo rejoined the rest of the US men's national team at the 2007 Melbourne World Championships. Azevedo played for Jug from Dubrovnik for two seasons from 2008 until 2010. In 2010s he continued to play for Croatian water polo squad from Dubrovnik.

=== Coaching ===
Azevedo has coached, and conducted camps and clinics around the U.S., and is a founder of 6-8 sports which has a mobile application, and a training academy for age-group water polo players which was based in Fountain Valley California in 2026.

=== Honors ===
Azevedo received numerous distinctions at Stanford, including becoming the school's highest career points scorer at the end of his Senior year. Azevedo became a member of the USA Water Polo Hall of Fame in 2021, and had the rare distinction of receiving the Peter J. Cutino award, as water polo's top collegiate player, for all four years of his Stanford career.

=== Podcast ===
In 2020, he began co-hosting The Tony Azevedo Podcast with El Segundo, California stand-up comic Dave Williamson.

== Personal life ==
Tony is married to Sarah Azevedo, and has one son.

The Azevedo family has been an Olympic dynasty, initially for Brazil. Tony's great-grandfather was a 1908 Olympic gymnast, two great Aunts were 1936 Olympic swimmers, an uncle was a 1972 swimming Olympian, and father Ricardo played water polo in both the 1976 and 1980 Olympics. As a legendary coach and player, Tony's father Ricardo, played on the Brazilian national water polo team and coached Tony throughout his age group and high school career. As noted earlier, father Ricardo Azevedo was Head Water Polo Coach both of the U.S. National Team and Long Beach State University. Tony's sister Cassie was a two-time All-American water polo player at Long Beach State. Cassie also plays professionally in Italy after adjusting to a congenital health condition that temporarily sidetracked her water polo career.

== See also ==
- List of athletes with the most appearances at Olympic Games
- List of players who have appeared in multiple men's Olympic water polo tournaments
- List of Olympic medalists in water polo (men)
- List of men's Olympic water polo tournament top goalscorers
