= Dejan Udovičić =

Serbian water polo player and coach

Personal information
- Born: July 26, 1970 (age 55) Belgrade, SR Serbia, SFR Yugoslavia
Medal record
Men's water polo
Head Coach for Serbia
Olympic Games
Bronze medal – third place	2008 Beijing
Bronze medal – third place	2012 London
World Championship
Gold medal – first place	2009 Rome
Silver medal – second place	2011 Shanghai
European Championship
Gold medal – first place	2006 Belgrade
Gold medal – first place	2012 Eindhoven
Silver medal – second place	2008 Málaga
Bronze medal – third place	2010 Zagreb
FINA World League
Gold medal – first place	2006 Athens
Gold medal – first place	2007 Berlin
Gold medal – first place	2008 Genova
Gold medal – first place	2010 Niš
Gold medal – first place	2011 Firenze
Bronze medal – third place	2009 Podgorica
FINA World Cup
Gold medal – first place	2006 Budapest
Gold medal – first place	2010 Oreada
Mediterranean Games
Gold medal – first place	2009 Pescara
Head Coach for United States
Olympic Games
Bronze medal – third place	2024 Paris
FINA World League
Silver medal – second place	2016 Huizhou
Silver medal – second place	2020 Tbilisi
Silver medal – second place	2022 Strasbourg
FINA World Cup
Bronze medal – third place	2023 Los Angeles
Pan American Games
Gold medal – first place	2015 Toronto
Gold medal – first place	2019 Lima
Gold medal – first place	2023 Santiago

Dejan Udovičić (Serbian Cyrillic: Дејан Удовичић; born 26 July 1970) is a Serbian professional water polo head coach who coached the U.S. men's national water polo team, beginning in 2013, and coached the US men's Olympic team at the 2016, 2020, and 2024 Olympics. He was named head coach for Serbia in June 2006, after the dissolution of the state union of Serbia and Montenegro. As a senior, he played for Partizan Belgrade and VK Beograd, while his coaching career started with Partizan where he stayed for nine seasons (2000-2009). His most notable achievement with the club was third place at the 2007 Euroleague Final Four in Milan. As the head coach of the Serbian national team, they won gold medals at the 2009 World Aquatics Championships and the 2006 Men's European Water Polo Championship, as well as the 2012 Men's European Water Polo Championship. He has also steered the national team to a bronze medal at the 2008 Olympics in Beijing.

== Early life ==
Dejan and his twin brother Darko began playing water polo in primary school, after a friend of their father's recommended they try the sport. Though both were attracted to and competed in other sports, they decided to focus on water polo. At that time, Partizan had top level coaches who had emerged from the famous Yugoslav water polo school headed by Bata Vlaho Orlić (1934-2010). One of the top experts was Nikola Stamenić, who saw, early on, Dejan's potential as a player and even as a future coach. Dejan went on to play for Partizan with great success and became a member of the national team which he then captained for almost 15 years. On the other hand, Darko became the record holder for most games played in of the most successful national water polo teams of all time. While Darko ended his career as a player, Dejan took up coaching.

== US Head Olympic Coach ==
In 2013, Udovičić became head coach of America's Senior National Water Polo Team. He served as a U.S. Coach at the 2016 Rio de Janeiro Games, where the U.S. finished 10th, and at the 2020 Tokyo Summer Olympic games where the U.S. finished sixth. He was credited with leading the U.S. to a bronze medal at the 2024 Olympics in Paris, the first for the program since 2008.

== Club career as a coach ==
=== VK Partizan (2000–2009) ===
Udovičić left the club on April 23, 2009, after his team's defeat against Jug in the Euroleague quarterfinals, which meant the Serbian champions failed to qualify for the Final Four.

== Career as a Serbia national team coach ==
=== 2012 Olympic Games in London ===
At the first training session before the 2012 European Championship, Udovičić showed his players an image of the gold medals which were to be awarded to the winners of the Olympic tournament in London. He told his players, "When you start feeling like training is taking a toll on you, these images should remind you to keep working as hard as you can!"

== Honours ==
=== As a Coach ===
VK Partizan

- National Championship of Serbia (4): 2001–02, 2006–07, 2007–08, 2008–09
- National Cup of Serbia (4): 2001–02, 2006–07, 2007–08, 2008–09

=== Individual ===
- OCS Coach of the Year Award (1): 2009

== Public Engagements ==
In 2011, Udovičić - with his fellow countrymen Vlade Divac and Slobodan Soro - appeared in a TV commercial for a Quit smoking campaign.
