= United States men's Olympic water polo team statistics (matches played) =

This article contains lists of matches played by the United States men's national water polo team players at the Summer Olympics, and is part of the United States men's Olympic water polo team statistics series. The lists are updated as of March 30, 2020.

== Abbreviations ==
No.	Cap number	Rk	Rank	Ref	Reference
H	Handedness	L	Left-handed	R	Right-handed
Pos	Playing position	FP	Field player	GK	Goalkeeper
CB	Center back (2-meter defense)	CF	Center forward (2-meter offense)	D	Driver (attacker)
U	Utility (except goalkeeper)	MP	Matches played	TMP	Total matches played

== Players with at least one match played at the Olympics ==
The following table is pre-sorted by number of total matches played (in descending order), edition of the Olympics (in ascending order), name of the player (in ascending order), respectively.

Tony Azevedo is the American water polo player with the most matches played at the Olympic Games.

Players with at least one match played at the Olympics
Rk	Player	Games (matches played)	TMP	Pos	H	Height	Ref
1	Tony Azevedo	2000 (8), 2004 (7), 2008 (7) (silver) , 2012 (8), 2016 (5)	35	D	R	6 ft 1 in (1.85 m)	
2	Ryan Bailey	2000 (8), 2004 (7), 2008 (7) (silver) , 2012 (8)	30	CF	R	6 ft 5.5 in (1.97 m)	
3	Jesse Smith	2004 (7), 2008 (7) (silver) , 2012 (8), 2016 (5)	27	CB/U	R	6 ft 4 in (1.93 m)	
4	Chris Humbert	1992 (7), 1996 (8), 2000 (8)	23	CF	L	6 ft 6.5 in (1.99 m)	
4	Wolf Wigo	1996 (8), 2000 (8), 2004 (7)	23	D		6 ft 1.5 in (1.87 m)	
6	Layne Beaubien	2004 (7), 2008 (7) (silver) , 2012 (8)	22	CB/U	R	6 ft 5.5 in (1.97 m)	
6	Jeff Powers	2004 (7), 2008 (7) (silver) , 2012 (8)	22	CF/CB/U	R	6 ft 7 in (2.01 m)	
6	Adam Wright	2004 (7), 2008 (7) (silver) , 2012 (8)	22	D	R	6 ft 3 in (1.91 m)	
9	Terry Schroeder	1984 (7) (silver) , 1988 (7) (silver) , 1992 (7)	21	CF		6 ft 2.5 in (1.89 m)	
9	Craig Wilson	1984 (7) (silver) , 1988 (7) (silver) , 1992 (7)	21	GK		6 ft 4.5 in (1.94 m)	
9	Mike Evans	1988 (7) (silver) , 1992 (6), 1996 (8)	21	D		6 ft 2 in (1.88 m)	
12	Stan Cole	1964 (3), 1968 (8), 1972 (9) (bronze)	20	CF/D	R	6 ft 1 in (1.85 m)	
13	Merrill Moses	2008 (7) (silver) , 2012 (8), 2016 (4)	19	GK	R	6 ft 3 in (1.91 m)	
14	Ron Crawford	1960 (6), 1964 (3), 1968 (8)	17	D/CF	R	5 ft 10.5 in (1.79 m)	
14	Steve Barnett	1968 (8), 1972 (9) (bronze)	17	GK		6 ft 3 in (1.91 m)	
14	Bruce Bradley	1968 (8), 1972 (9) (bronze)	17	FP		6 ft 2 in (1.88 m)	
14	John Parker	1968 (8), 1972 (9) (bronze)	17	FP		6 ft 2 in (1.88 m)	
14	Gary Sheerer	1968 (8), 1972 (9) (bronze)	17	FP		5 ft 8.5 in (1.74 m)	
14	Russ Webb	1968 (8), 1972 (9) (bronze)	17	CB		6 ft 2 in (1.88 m)	
14	Barry Weitzenberg	1968 (8), 1972 (9) (bronze)	17	FP		6 ft 1 in (1.85 m)	
21	Chris Duplanty	1988 (7) (silver) , 1992 (1), 1996 (8)	16	GK		6 ft 2.5 in (1.89 m)	
21	Gavin Arroyo	1996 (8), 2000 (8)	16	CB		6 ft 2.5 in (1.89 m)	
21	Kyle Kopp	1996 (8), 2000 (8)	16	CF		6 ft 6.5 in (1.99 m)	
21	Chris Oeding	1996 (8), 2000 (8)	16	D		6 ft 0.5 in (1.84 m)	
25	Kirk Everist	1992 (7), 1996 (8)	15	D		6 ft 2.5 in (1.89 m)	
25	Alex Rousseau	1992 (7), 1996 (8)	15	CF	L	6 ft 4.5 in (1.94 m)	
25	Peter Hudnut	2008 (7) (silver) , 2012 (8)	15	CB	R	6 ft 5 in (1.96 m)	
25	Tim Hutten	2008 (7) (silver) , 2012 (8)	15	CB	R	6 ft 5 in (1.96 m)	
25	Peter Varellas	2008 (7) (silver) , 2012 (8)	15	D	L	6 ft 3 in (1.91 m)	
30	Bob Hughes	1952 (9), 1956 (5)	14	CF		6 ft 6 in (1.98 m)	
30	Jody Campbell	1984 (7) (silver) , 1988 (7) (silver)	14	CF		6 ft 2.5 in (1.89 m)	
30	Peter Campbell	1984 (7) (silver) , 1988 (7) (silver)	14	CF/U		6 ft 3.5 in (1.92 m)	
30	Kevin Robertson	1984 (7) (silver) , 1988 (7) (silver)	14	D	L	5 ft 8.5 in (1.74 m)	
30	Jeff Campbell	1988 (7) (silver) , 1992 (7)	14	CB		6 ft 3.5 in (1.92 m)	
30	Doug Kimbell	1988 (7) (silver) , 1992 (7)	14	CB		6 ft 8.5 in (2.04 m)	
36	Craig Klass	1988 (7) (silver) , 1992 (6)	13	CF	L	6 ft 4.5 in (1.94 m)	
36	John Mann	2012 (8), 2016 (5)	13	CF	R	6 ft 6 in (1.98 m)	
38	Bill Kooistra	1952 (7), 1956 (5)	12	FP		5 ft 10.5 in (1.79 m)	
38	Wally Wolf	1956 (5), 1960 (7)	12	FP		5 ft 10.5 in (1.79 m)	
40	Dave Ashleigh	1964 (3), 1968 (8)	11	FP	R	6 ft 0 in (1.83 m)	
40	Tony van Dorp	1964 (3), 1968 (8)	11	GK	R	6 ft 5 in (1.96 m)	
42	Wally O'Connor	1924 (1) (bronze) , 1928 (2), 1932 (4) (bronze) , 1936 (3)	10	FP			
42	Marvin Burns	1952 (5), 1960 (5)	10	FP		6 ft 3.5 in (1.92 m)	
42	Ronald Severa	1956 (3), 1960 (7)	10	FP		5 ft 10.5 in (1.79 m)	
42	Dan Hackett	1996 (2), 2000 (8)	10	GK		6 ft 5.5 in (1.97 m)	
46	Harry Bisbey	1952 (9)	9	GK			
46	Robert Horn	1956 (5), 1960 (4)	9	GK		6 ft 2.5 in (1.89 m)	
46	Peter Asch	1972 (9) (bronze)	9	FP		6 ft 2 in (1.88 m)	
46	Jim Ferguson	1972 (9) (bronze)	9	D		6 ft 2 in (1.88 m)	
46	Eric Lindroth	1972 (9) (bronze)	9	CF	L	6 ft 2 in (1.88 m)	
46	Jim Slatton	1972 (9) (bronze)	9	GK		6 ft 2 in (1.88 m)	
46	Brandon Brooks	2004 (7), 2008 (2) (silver)	9	GK	R	6 ft 5.5 in (1.97 m)	
53	Herb Vollmer	1920 (3), 1924 (5) (bronze)	8	FP		6 ft 0 in (1.83 m)	
53	George Mitchell	1924 (5) (bronze) , 1928 (3)	8	FP			
53	George Schroth	1924 (5) (bronze) , 1928 (3)	8	FP		6 ft 4 in (1.93 m)	
53	Edward Jaworski	1952 (8)	8	FP			
53	Jim Norris	1952 (8)	8	CB		5 ft 10.5 in (1.79 m)	
53	Dean Willeford	1968 (8)	8	FP		5 ft 10.5 in (1.79 m)	
53	Troy Barnhart, Jr.	1996 (8)	8	CF		6 ft 3.5 in (1.92 m)	
53	Jeremy Laster	1996 (8)	8	D	L	6 ft 4.5 in (1.94 m)	
53	Rick McNair	1996 (8)	8	CB		6 ft 4.5 in (1.94 m)	
53	Sean Kern	2000 (8)	8	CF/CB		6 ft 4.5 in (1.94 m)	
53	Chi Kredell	2000 (8)	8	CB		6 ft 1.5 in (1.87 m)	
53	Robert Lynn	2000 (8)	8	CB/U		6 ft 1.5 in (1.87 m)	
53	Brad Schumacher	2000 (8)	8	D		6 ft 3.5 in (1.92 m)	
53	Shea Buckner	2012 (8)	8	D	R	6 ft 5 in (1.96 m)	
67	Phil Daubenspeck	1932 (4) (bronze) , 1936 (3)	7	FP			
67	Charley Finn	1932 (4) (bronze) , 1936 (3)	7	FP			
67	Harold McCallister	1932 (4) (bronze) , 1936 (3)	7	FP			
67	Bill Dornblaser	1952 (7)	7	FP			
67	Fred Tisue	1960 (7)	7	FP		5 ft 8.5 in (1.74 m)	
67	Doug Burke	1984 (7) (silver)	7	D		6 ft 0 in (1.83 m)	
67	Gary Figueroa	1984 (7) (silver)	7	D		6 ft 0 in (1.83 m)	
67	Drew McDonald	1984 (7) (silver)	7	CB		6 ft 4.5 in (1.94 m)	
67	Tim Shaw	1984 (7) (silver)	7	D		6 ft 2 in (1.88 m)	
67	John Siman	1984 (7) (silver)	7	CB		6 ft 5.5 in (1.97 m)	
67	Jon Svendsen	1984 (7) (silver)	7	CB		6 ft 2.5 in (1.89 m)	
67	Joe Vargas	1984 (7) (silver)	7	D		6 ft 2.5 in (1.89 m)	
67	James Bergeson	1988 (7) (silver)	7	D		6 ft 0 in (1.83 m)	
67	Greg Boyer	1988 (7) (silver)	7	CF		6 ft 2.5 in (1.89 m)	
67	Alan Mouchawar	1988 (7) (silver)	7	U		6 ft 0.5 in (1.84 m)	
67	Erich Fischer	1992 (7)	7	CB/U		6 ft 2.5 in (1.89 m)	
67	Charlie Harris	1992 (7)	7	CF		6 ft 4.5 in (1.94 m)	
67	Omar Amr	2004 (7)	7	D		5 ft 10.5 in (1.79 m)	
67	Dan Klatt	2004 (7)	7	CB		6 ft 4.5 in (1.94 m)	
67	Brett Ormsby	2004 (7)	7	D		6 ft 2.5 in (1.89 m)	
67	Chris Segesman	2004 (7)	7	CB		6 ft 3.5 in (1.92 m)	
67	J. W. Krumpholz	2008 (7) (silver)	7	CF	R	6 ft 3 in (1.91 m)	
67	Rick Merlo	2008 (7) (silver)	7	U	R	6 ft 3 in (1.91 m)	
90	Fred Lauer	1924 (5) (bronze) , 1936 (1)	6	GK			
90	Herb Wildman	1932 (4) (bronze) , 1936 (2)	6	GK			
90	Kenneth Beck	1936 (3), 1948 (3)	6	FP			
90	Bob Frojen	1956 (6)	6	FP		5 ft 11 in (1.80 m)	
90	Bill Ross	1956 (6)	6	FP		6 ft 5.5 in (1.97 m)	
90	John Vargas	1992 (6)	6	D		5 ft 10 in (1.78 m)	
96	Art Austin	1924 (5) (bronze)	5	FP			
96	Oliver Horn	1924 (5) (bronze)	5	FP		5 ft 10 in (1.78 m)	
96	Jack Spargo	1952 (5)	5	D		5 ft 9 in (1.75 m)	
96	Chuck Bittick	1960 (5)	5	FP		6 ft 2 in (1.88 m)	
96	Bret Bonanni	2016 (5)	5	D	R	6 ft 4 in (1.93 m)	
96	Luca Cupido	2016 (5)	5	D	R	6 ft 4 in (1.93 m)	
96	Thomas Dunstan	2016 (5)	5	D	L	6 ft 4 in (1.93 m)	
96	Ben Hallock	2016 (5)	5	CF	R	6 ft 6 in (1.98 m)	
96	Alex Obert	2016 (5)	5	CF/CB	R	6 ft 6 in (1.98 m)	
96	Josh Samuels	2016 (5)	5	D	R	6 ft 4 in (1.93 m)	
106	Austin Clapp	1932 (4) (bronze)	4	FP			
106	Cal Strong	1932 (4) (bronze)	4	FP			
106	Dixon Fiske	1936 (1), 1948 (3)	4	FP			
106	Sam Kooistra	1956 (4)	4	FP		6 ft 0.5 in (1.84 m)	
106	Chick McIlroy	1960 (1), 1964 (3)	4	D/CF	R	5 ft 10.5 in (1.79 m)	
106	Ron Volmer	1960 (4)	4	FP		6 ft 0 in (1.83 m)	
106	Alex Bowen	2016 (4)	4	D	R	6 ft 5 in (1.96 m)	
106	Alex Roelse	2016 (4)	4	CB	R	6 ft 7 in (2.01 m)	
114	James Carson	1920 (3)	3	FP			
114	Harry Hebner	1920 (3)	3	FP		5 ft 10.5 in (1.79 m)	
114	Perry McGillivray	1920 (3)	3	FP		5 ft 6.5 in (1.69 m)	
114	William Vosburgh	1920 (3)	3	FP		5 ft 7.5 in (1.71 m)	
114	John Norton	1924 (3) (bronze)	3	FP			
114	Harry Daniels	1928 (3)	3	GK			
114	Sam Greller	1928 (3)	3	FP			
114	Herbert Topp	1928 (3)	3	FP			
114	Bob Bray	1948 (3)	3	CF			
114	Ralph Budelman	1948 (3)	3	GK			
114	Lee Case	1948 (3)	3	FP			
114	Chris Christensen	1948 (3)	3	FP			
114	Peter Stange	1952 (3)	3	FP			
114	Gordie Hall	1960 (3)	3	GK		6 ft 0.5 in (1.84 m)	
114	Dan Drown	1964 (3)	3	FP	R	6 ft 2 in (1.88 m)	
114	Ned McIlroy	1964 (3)	3	FP	R	5 ft 10 in (1.78 m)	
114	Bob Saari	1964 (3)	3	FP	R	6 ft 2 in (1.88 m)	
114	McQuin Baron	2016 (3)	3	GK	R	6 ft 8 in (2.03 m)	
132	David Bratton	1904 (2) (gold)	2				
132	Budd Goodwin	1904 (2) (gold)	2	FP			
132	Louis Handley	1904 (2) (gold)	2	FP			
132	David Hesser	1904 (2) (gold)	2	FP			
132	Joe Ruddy	1904 (2) (gold)	2	FP			
132	James Steen	1904 (2) (gold)	2				
132	George Van Cleaf	1904 (2) (gold)	2	FP		5 ft 8 in (1.73 m)	
132	Sophus Jensen	1920 (2)	2			5 ft 10.5 in (1.79 m)	
132	Mike McDermott	1920 (2)	2	FP			
132	Johnny Weissmuller	1924 (1) (bronze) , 1928 (1)	2	FP		6 ft 3 in (1.91 m)	
132	Richard Greenberg	1928 (2)	2	FP			
132	Ray Ruddy	1936 (2)	2	FP			
132	Edwin Knox	1948 (2)	2	FP			
132	Norman Lake	1952 (2)	2	FP			
132	Jim Gaughran	1956 (2)	2	FP		6 ft 2 in (1.88 m)	
147	Rex Beach	1904 (1) (silver)	1				
147	Gwynne Evans	1904 (1) (bronze)	1				
147	Gus Goessling	1904 (1) (bronze)	1				
147	David Hammond	1904 (1) (silver)	1				
147	Charles Healy	1904 (1) (silver)	1				
147	Frank Kehoe	1904 (1) (silver)	1				
147	John Meyers	1904 (1) (bronze)	1				
147	Bill Orthwein	1904 (1) (bronze)	1				
147	Amedee Reyburn	1904 (1) (bronze)	1				
147	Frank Schreiner	1904 (1) (bronze)	1				
147	Jerome Steever	1904 (1) (silver)	1				
147	Edwin Swatek	1904 (1) (silver)	1				
147	Manfred Toeppen	1904 (1) (bronze)	1				
147	Bill Tuttle	1904 (1) (silver)	1				
147	Preston Steiger	1920 (1)	1				
147	Herbert Taylor	1920 (1)	1			5 ft 6.5 in (1.69 m)	
147	Paul Samson	1928 (1)	1	FP		6 ft 5.5 in (1.97 m)	
147	Harold Dash	1948 (1)	1	FP			
147	Ken Hahn	1956 (1)	1	GK		6 ft 0 in (1.83 m)	
147	George Stransky	1964 (1)	1	GK	R	6 ft 2 in (1.88 m)	
147	Ralph Whitney	1964 (1)	1	FP	R	5 ft 10.5 in (1.79 m)	
147	Chris Dorst	1984 (1) (silver)	1	GK		6 ft 3.5 in (1.92 m)	
147	Sean Nolan	2000 (1)	1	GK		6 ft 5.5 in (1.97 m)	
147	Genai Kerr	2004 (1)	1	GK		6 ft 7.5 in (2.02 m)	
147	Chay Lapin	2012 (1)	1	GK	R	6 ft 5.5 in (1.97 m)	
Rk	Player	Games (matches played)	TMP	Pos	H	Height	Ref

=== Historical progression – total matches played ===
The following table shows the historical progression of the record of total matches played at the Olympic Games.

TMP	Achievement	Games	No.	Player	Pos	H	Height	Date	Age	Duration of record	Ref
10	Set record	1936		Wally O'Connor	FP			Aug 10, 1936	32	20 years, 116 days	
14	Broke record	1956		Bob Hughes	CF		6 ft 6 in (1.98 m)	Dec 4, 1956	25	11 years, 326 days	
17	Broke record	1968	4	Ron Crawford	D/CF	R	5 ft 10.5 in (1.79 m)	Oct 25, 1968	28	3 years, 315 days	
20	Broke record	1972 (bronze)	2	Stan Cole	CF/D	R	6 ft 1 in (1.85 m)	Sep 4, 1972	26	19 years, 340 days	
21	Broke record	1992	1	Craig Wilson	GK		6 ft 4.5 in (1.94 m)	Aug 9, 1992	35	8 years, 53 days	
21	Broke record	1992	10	Terry Schroeder	CF		6 ft 2.5 in (1.89 m)	Aug 9, 1992	33	8 years, 53 days	
21	Tied record	1996	11	Mike Evans	D		6 ft 2 in (1.88 m)	Jul 28, 1996	36	8 years, 53 days	
23	Broke record	2000	10	Chris Humbert	CF	L	6 ft 6.5 in (1.99 m)	Oct 1, 2000	30	11 years, 316 days	
23	Tied record	2004	2	Wolf Wigo	D		6 ft 1.5 in (1.87 m)	Aug 29, 2004	31	11 years, 316 days	
30	Broke record	2012	8	Tony Azevedo	D	R	6 ft 1 in (1.85 m)	Aug 12, 2012	30	4 years, 2 days	
30	Broke record	2012	9	Ryan Bailey	CF	R	6 ft 5.5 in (1.97 m)	Aug 12, 2012	36	4 years, 2 days	
35	Broke record	2016	8	Tony Azevedo	D	R	6 ft 1 in (1.85 m)	Aug 14, 2016	34	8 years, 205 days	

== Players with at least one match played in an Olympic tournament ==
The following table is pre-sorted by number of matches played (in descending order), edition of the Olympics (in ascending order), Cap number or name of the player (in ascending order), respectively.

Players with at least one match played in an Olympic tournament
Rk	Player	Games	No.	MP	Pos	H	Height	Age	Ref
1	Harry Bisbey	1952		9	GK			21	
1	Bob Hughes	1952		9	CF		6 ft 6 in (1.98 m)	21	
1	Jim Slatton	1972 (bronze)	1	9	GK		6 ft 2 in (1.88 m)	25	
1	Stan Cole	1972 (bronze)	2	9	CF/D	R	6 ft 1 in (1.85 m)	26	
1	Russ Webb	1972 (bronze)	3	9	CB		6 ft 2 in (1.88 m)	27	
1	Barry Weitzenberg	1972 (bronze)	4	9	FP		6 ft 1 in (1.85 m)	25	
1	Gary Sheerer	1972 (bronze)	5	9	FP		5 ft 8.5 in (1.74 m)	25	
1	Bruce Bradley	1972 (bronze)	6	9	FP		6 ft 2 in (1.88 m)	25	
1	Peter Asch	1972 (bronze)	7	9	FP		6 ft 2 in (1.88 m)	23	
1	Jim Ferguson	1972 (bronze)	8	9	D		6 ft 2 in (1.88 m)	23	
1	Steve Barnett	1972 (bronze)	9	9	GK		6 ft 3 in (1.91 m)	29	
1	John Parker	1972 (bronze)	10	9	FP		6 ft 2 in (1.88 m)	25	
1	Eric Lindroth	1972 (bronze)	11	9	CF	L	6 ft 2 in (1.88 m)	20	
14	Edward Jaworski	1952		8	FP			26	
14	Jim Norris	1952		8	CB		5 ft 10.5 in (1.79 m)	22	
14	Tony van Dorp	1968	1	8	GK	R	6 ft 5 in (1.96 m)	32	
14	Dave Ashleigh	1968	2	8	FP	R	6 ft 0 in (1.83 m)	25	
14	Russ Webb	1968	3	8	CB		6 ft 2 in (1.88 m)	23	
14	Ron Crawford	1968	4	8	D/CF	R	5 ft 10.5 in (1.79 m)	28	
14	Stan Cole	1968	5	8	CF/D	R	6 ft 1 in (1.85 m)	23	
14	Bruce Bradley	1968	6	8	FP		6 ft 2 in (1.88 m)	21	
14	Dean Willeford	1968	7	8	FP		5 ft 10.5 in (1.79 m)	24	
14	Barry Weitzenberg	1968	8	8	FP		6 ft 1 in (1.85 m)	22	
14	Gary Sheerer	1968	9	8	FP		5 ft 8.5 in (1.74 m)	21	
14	John Parker	1968	10	8	FP		6 ft 2 in (1.88 m)	22	
14	Steve Barnett	1968	11	8	GK		6 ft 3 in (1.91 m)	25	
14	Chris Duplanty	1996	1	8	GK		6 ft 2.5 in (1.89 m)	30	
14	Jeremy Laster	1996	3	8	D	L	6 ft 4.5 in (1.94 m)	22	
14	Kyle Kopp	1996	4	8	CF		6 ft 6.5 in (1.99 m)	29	
14	Chris Oeding	1996	5	8	D		6 ft 0.5 in (1.84 m)	24	
14	Gavin Arroyo	1996	6	8	CB		6 ft 2.5 in (1.89 m)	24	
14	Alex Rousseau	1996	7	8	CF	L	6 ft 4.5 in (1.94 m)	28	
14	Rick McNair	1996	8	8	CB		6 ft 4.5 in (1.94 m)	24	
14	Kirk Everist	1996	9	8	D		6 ft 2.5 in (1.89 m)	29	
14	Chris Humbert	1996	10	8	CF	L	6 ft 6.5 in (1.99 m)	26	
14	Mike Evans	1996	11	8	D		6 ft 2 in (1.88 m)	36	
14	Troy Barnhart, Jr.	1996	12	8	CF		6 ft 3.5 in (1.92 m)	25	
14	Wolf Wigo	1996	13	8	D		6 ft 1.5 in (1.87 m)	23	
14	Dan Hackett	2000	1	8	GK		6 ft 5.5 in (1.97 m)	30	
14	Chi Kredell	2000	2	8	CB		6 ft 1.5 in (1.87 m)	29	
14	Robert Lynn	2000	3	8	CB/U		6 ft 1.5 in (1.87 m)	33	
14	Kyle Kopp	2000	4	8	CF		6 ft 6.5 in (1.99 m)	33	
14	Chris Oeding	2000	5	8	D		6 ft 0.5 in (1.84 m)	29	
14	Gavin Arroyo	2000	6	8	CB		6 ft 2.5 in (1.89 m)	28	
14	Brad Schumacher	2000	7	8	D		6 ft 3.5 in (1.92 m)	26	
14	Tony Azevedo	2000	8	8	D	R	6 ft 1 in (1.85 m)	18	
14	Wolf Wigo	2000	9	8	D		6 ft 1.5 in (1.87 m)	27	
14	Chris Humbert	2000	10	8	CF	L	6 ft 6.5 in (1.99 m)	30	
14	Sean Kern	2000	11	8	CF/CB		6 ft 4.5 in (1.94 m)	22	
14	Ryan Bailey	2000	13	8	CF	R	6 ft 5.5 in (1.97 m)	25	
14	Merrill Moses	2012	1	8	GK	R	6 ft 3 in (1.91 m)	34	
14	Peter Varellas	2012	2	8	D	L	6 ft 3 in (1.91 m)	27	
14	Peter Hudnut	2012	3	8	CB	R	6 ft 5 in (1.96 m)	32	
14	Jeff Powers	2012	4	8	CB	R	6 ft 7 in (2.01 m)	32	
14	Adam Wright	2012	5	8	D	R	6 ft 3 in (1.91 m)	35	
14	Shea Buckner	2012	6	8	D	R	6 ft 5 in (1.96 m)	25	
14	Layne Beaubien	2012	7	8	U	R	6 ft 5.5 in (1.97 m)	36	
14	Tony Azevedo	2012	8	8	D	R	6 ft 1 in (1.85 m)	30	
14	Ryan Bailey	2012	9	8	CF	R	6 ft 5.5 in (1.97 m)	36	
14	Tim Hutten	2012	10	8	CB	R	6 ft 5 in (1.96 m)	27	
14	Jesse Smith	2012	11	8	CB	R	6 ft 4 in (1.93 m)	29	
14	John Mann	2012	12	8	CF	R	6 ft 6 in (1.98 m)	27	
63	Bill Dornblaser	1952		7	FP			18	
63	Bill Kooistra	1952		7	FP		5 ft 10.5 in (1.79 m)	25	
63	Ronald Severa	1960		7	FP		5 ft 10.5 in (1.79 m)	24	
63	Fred Tisue	1960		7	FP		5 ft 8.5 in (1.74 m)	21	
63	Wally Wolf	1960		7	FP		5 ft 10.5 in (1.79 m)	29	
63	Craig Wilson	1984 (silver)	1	7	GK		6 ft 4.5 in (1.94 m)	27	
63	Kevin Robertson	1984 (silver)	2	7	D	L	5 ft 8.5 in (1.74 m)	25	
63	Gary Figueroa	1984 (silver)	3	7	D		6 ft 0 in (1.83 m)	27	
63	Peter Campbell	1984 (silver)	4	7	CF		6 ft 3.5 in (1.92 m)	24	
63	Doug Burke	1984 (silver)	5	7	D		6 ft 0 in (1.83 m)	27	
63	Joe Vargas	1984 (silver)	6	7	D		6 ft 2.5 in (1.89 m)	28	
63	Jon Svendsen	1984 (silver)	7	7	CB		6 ft 2.5 in (1.89 m)	30	
63	John Siman	1984 (silver)	8	7	CB		6 ft 5.5 in (1.97 m)	31	
63	Drew McDonald	1984 (silver)	9	7	CB		6 ft 4.5 in (1.94 m)	28	
63	Terry Schroeder	1984 (silver)	10	7	CF		6 ft 2.5 in (1.89 m)	25	
63	Jody Campbell	1984 (silver)	11	7	CF		6 ft 2.5 in (1.89 m)	24	
63	Tim Shaw	1984 (silver)	12	7	D		6 ft 2 in (1.88 m)	26	
63	Craig Wilson	1988 (silver)	1	7	GK		6 ft 4.5 in (1.94 m)	31	
63	Kevin Robertson	1988 (silver)	2	7	D	L	5 ft 8.5 in (1.74 m)	29	
63	James Bergeson	1988 (silver)	3	7	D		6 ft 0 in (1.83 m)	27	
63	Peter Campbell	1988 (silver)	4	7	CF/U		6 ft 3.5 in (1.92 m)	28	
63	Doug Kimbell	1988 (silver)	5	7	CB		6 ft 8.5 in (2.04 m)	28	
63	Craig Klass	1988 (silver)	6	7	CF	L	6 ft 4.5 in (1.94 m)	23	
63	Alan Mouchawar	1988 (silver)	7	7	U		6 ft 0.5 in (1.84 m)	28	
63	Jeff Campbell	1988 (silver)	8	7	CB		6 ft 3.5 in (1.92 m)	25	
63	Greg Boyer	1988 (silver)	9	7	CF		6 ft 2.5 in (1.89 m)	30	
63	Terry Schroeder	1988 (silver)	10	7	CF		6 ft 2.5 in (1.89 m)	29	
63	Jody Campbell	1988 (silver)	11	7	CF		6 ft 2.5 in (1.89 m)	28	
63	Chris Duplanty	1988 (silver)	12	7	GK		6 ft 2.5 in (1.89 m)	22	
63	Mike Evans	1988 (silver)	13	7	D		6 ft 2 in (1.88 m)	28	
63	Craig Wilson	1992	1	7	GK		6 ft 4.5 in (1.94 m)	35	
63	Doug Kimbell	1992	5	7	CB		6 ft 8.5 in (2.04 m)	32	
63	Charlie Harris	1992	6	7	CF		6 ft 4.5 in (1.94 m)	28	
63	Kirk Everist	1992	7	7	D		6 ft 2.5 in (1.89 m)	25	
63	Jeff Campbell	1992	8	7	CB		6 ft 3.5 in (1.92 m)	29	
63	Chris Humbert	1992	9	7	CF	L	6 ft 6.5 in (1.99 m)	22	
63	Terry Schroeder	1992	10	7	CF		6 ft 2.5 in (1.89 m)	33	
63	Erich Fischer	1992	12	7	CB/U		6 ft 2.5 in (1.89 m)	26	
63	Alex Rousseau	1992	13	7	CF	L	6 ft 4.5 in (1.94 m)	24	
63	Brandon Brooks	2004	1	7	GK	R	6 ft 5.5 in (1.97 m)	23	
63	Wolf Wigo	2004	2	7	D		6 ft 1.5 in (1.87 m)	31	
63	Omar Amr	2004	3	7	D		5 ft 10.5 in (1.79 m)	29	
63	Jeff Powers	2004	4	7	CF	R	6 ft 7 in (2.01 m)	24	
63	Adam Wright	2004	5	7	D	R	6 ft 3 in (1.91 m)	27	
63	Chris Segesman	2004	6	7	CB		6 ft 3.5 in (1.92 m)	25	
63	Layne Beaubien	2004	7	7	CB	R	6 ft 5.5 in (1.97 m)	28	
63	Tony Azevedo	2004	8	7	D	R	6 ft 1 in (1.85 m)	22	
63	Dan Klatt	2004	9	7	CB		6 ft 4.5 in (1.94 m)	25	
63	Brett Ormsby	2004	10	7	D		6 ft 2.5 in (1.89 m)	21	
63	Jesse Smith	2004	11	7	U	R	6 ft 4 in (1.93 m)	21	
63	Ryan Bailey	2004	13	7	CF	R	6 ft 5.5 in (1.97 m)	29	
63	Merrill Moses	2008 (silver)	1	7	GK	R	6 ft 3 in (1.91 m)	31	
63	Peter Varellas	2008 (silver)	2	7	D	L	6 ft 3 in (1.91 m)	23	
63	Peter Hudnut	2008 (silver)	3	7	CB	R	6 ft 5 in (1.96 m)	28	
63	Jeff Powers	2008 (silver)	4	7	U	R	6 ft 7 in (2.01 m)	28	
63	Adam Wright	2008 (silver)	5	7	D	R	6 ft 3 in (1.91 m)	31	
63	Rick Merlo	2008 (silver)	6	7	U	R	6 ft 3 in (1.91 m)	26	
63	Layne Beaubien	2008 (silver)	7	7	U	R	6 ft 5.5 in (1.97 m)	32	
63	Tony Azevedo	2008 (silver)	8	7	D	R	6 ft 1 in (1.85 m)	26	
63	Ryan Bailey	2008 (silver)	9	7	CF	R	6 ft 5.5 in (1.97 m)	32	
63	Tim Hutten	2008 (silver)	10	7	CB	R	6 ft 5 in (1.96 m)	23	
63	Jesse Smith	2008 (silver)	11	7	CB	R	6 ft 4 in (1.93 m)	25	
63	J. W. Krumpholz	2008 (silver)	12	7	CF	R	6 ft 3 in (1.91 m)	20	
126	Bob Frojen	1956		6	FP		5 ft 11 in (1.80 m)	26	
126	Bill Ross	1956		6	FP		6 ft 5.5 in (1.97 m)	28	
126	Ron Crawford	1960		6	D/CF	R	5 ft 10.5 in (1.79 m)	20	
126	John Vargas	1992	2	6	D		5 ft 10 in (1.78 m)	31	
126	Mike Evans	1992	4	6	D		6 ft 2 in (1.88 m)	32	
126	Craig Klass	1992	11	6	CF	L	6 ft 4.5 in (1.94 m)	27	
132	Art Austin	1924 (bronze)		5	FP			22	
132	Oliver Horn	1924 (bronze)		5	FP		5 ft 10 in (1.78 m)	23	
132	Fred Lauer	1924 (bronze)		5	GK			25	
132	George Mitchell	1924 (bronze)		5	FP			23	
132	George Schroth	1924 (bronze)		5	FP		6 ft 4 in (1.93 m)	24	
132	Herb Vollmer	1924 (bronze)		5	FP		6 ft 0 in (1.83 m)	29	
132	Marvin Burns	1952		5	FP		6 ft 3.5 in (1.92 m)	24	
132	Jack Spargo	1952		5	D		5 ft 9 in (1.75 m)	21	
132	Robert Horn	1956		5	GK		6 ft 2.5 in (1.89 m)	25	
132	Bob Hughes	1956		5	CF		6 ft 6 in (1.98 m)	25	
132	Bill Kooistra	1956		5	FP		5 ft 10.5 in (1.79 m)	30	
132	Wally Wolf	1956		5	FP		5 ft 10.5 in (1.79 m)	26	
132	Chuck Bittick	1960		5	FP		6 ft 2 in (1.88 m)	20	
132	Marvin Burns	1960		5	FP		6 ft 3.5 in (1.92 m)	32	
132	Thomas Dunstan	2016	2	5	D	L	6 ft 4 in (1.93 m)	18	
132	Ben Hallock	2016	3	5	CF	R	6 ft 6 in (1.98 m)	18	
132	Alex Obert	2016	4	5	CF/CB	R	6 ft 6 in (1.98 m)	24	
132	Luca Cupido	2016	6	5	D	R	6 ft 4 in (1.93 m)	20	
132	Josh Samuels	2016	7	5	D	R	6 ft 4 in (1.93 m)	25	
132	Tony Azevedo	2016	8	5	D	R	6 ft 1 in (1.85 m)	34	
132	Bret Bonanni	2016	10	5	D	R	6 ft 4 in (1.93 m)	22	
132	Jesse Smith	2016	11	5	U	R	6 ft 4 in (1.93 m)	33	
132	John Mann	2016	12	5	CF	R	6 ft 6 in (1.98 m)	31	
155	Austin Clapp	1932 (bronze)		4	FP			21	
155	Phil Daubenspeck	1932 (bronze)		4	FP			26	
155	Charley Finn	1932 (bronze)		4	FP			35	
155	Harold McCallister	1932 (bronze)		4	FP			28	
155	Wally O'Connor	1932 (bronze)		4	FP			28	
155	Cal Strong	1932 (bronze)		4	FP			24	
155	Herb Wildman	1932 (bronze)		4	GK			19	
155	Sam Kooistra	1956		4	FP		6 ft 0.5 in (1.84 m)	21	
155	Robert Horn	1960		4	GK		6 ft 2.5 in (1.89 m)	28	
155	Ron Volmer	1960		4	FP		6 ft 0 in (1.83 m)	24	
155	Merrill Moses	2016	1	4	GK	R	6 ft 3 in (1.91 m)	39	
155	Alex Roelse	2016	5	4	CB	R	6 ft 7 in (2.01 m)	21	
155	Alex Bowen	2016	9	4	D	R	6 ft 5 in (1.96 m)	22	
168	James Carson	1920		3	FP			19	
168	Harry Hebner	1920		3	FP		5 ft 10.5 in (1.79 m)	29	
168	Perry McGillivray	1920		3	FP		5 ft 6.5 in (1.69 m)	27	
168	Herb Vollmer	1920		3	FP		6 ft 0 in (1.83 m)	25	
168	William Vosburgh	1920		3	FP		5 ft 7.5 in (1.71 m)	29	
168	John Norton	1924 (bronze)		3	FP			24	
168	Harry Daniels	1928		3	GK			28	
168	Sam Greller	1928		3	FP			23	
168	George Mitchell	1928		3	FP			27	
168	George Schroth	1928		3	FP		6 ft 4 in (1.93 m)	28	
168	Herbert Topp	1928		3	FP			28	
168	Kenneth Beck	1936		3	FP			21	
168	Phil Daubenspeck	1936		3	FP			30	
168	Charley Finn	1936		3	FP			39	
168	Harold McCallister	1936		3	FP			32	
168	Wally O'Connor	1936		3	FP			32	
168	Kenneth Beck	1948		3	FP			33	
168	Bob Bray	1948		3	CF			28	
168	Ralph Budelman	1948		3	GK			30	
168	Lee Case	1948		3	FP			30	
168	Chris Christensen	1948		3	FP			29	
168	Dixon Fiske	1948		3	FP			33	
168	Peter Stange	1952		3	FP			21	
168	Ronald Severa	1956		3	FP		5 ft 10.5 in (1.79 m)	20	
168	Gordie Hall	1960		3	GK		6 ft 0.5 in (1.84 m)	24	
168	Tony van Dorp	1964	1	3	GK	R	6 ft 5 in (1.96 m)	28	
168	Ron Crawford	1964	2	3	D/CF	R	5 ft 10.5 in (1.79 m)	24	
168	Dave Ashleigh	1964	3	3	FP	R	6 ft 0 in (1.83 m)	21	
168	Ned McIlroy	1964	4	3	FP	R	5 ft 10 in (1.78 m)	25	
168	Chick McIlroy	1964	5	3	D/CF	R	5 ft 10.5 in (1.79 m)	26	
168	Stan Cole	1964	6	3	CF/D	R	6 ft 1 in (1.85 m)	19	
168	Bob Saari	1964	7	3	FP	R	6 ft 2 in (1.88 m)	16	
168	Dan Drown	1964	8	3	FP	R	6 ft 2 in (1.88 m)	21	
168	McQuin Baron	2016	13	3	GK	R	6 ft 8 in (2.03 m)	20	
202	David Bratton	1904 (gold)		2					
202	Budd Goodwin	1904 (gold)		2	FP			20	
202	Louis Handley	1904 (gold)		2	FP			30	
202	David Hesser	1904 (gold)		2	FP				
202	Joe Ruddy	1904 (gold)		2	FP			25	
202	James Steen	1904 (gold)		2				27	
202	George Van Cleaf	1904 (gold)		2	FP		5 ft 8 in (1.73 m)	24	
202	Sophus Jensen	1920		2			5 ft 10.5 in (1.79 m)	31	
202	Mike McDermott	1920		2	FP			27	
202	Richard Greenberg	1928		2	FP			26	
202	Wally O'Connor	1928		2	FP			24	
202	Ray Ruddy	1936		2	FP			24	
202	Herb Wildman	1936		2	GK			23	
202	Edwin Knox	1948		2	FP			34	
202	Norman Lake	1952		2	FP			19	
202	Jim Gaughran	1956		2	FP		6 ft 2 in (1.88 m)	24	
202	Dan Hackett	1996	2	2	GK		6 ft 5.5 in (1.97 m)	25	
202	Brandon Brooks	2008 (silver)	13	2	GK	R	6 ft 5.5 in (1.97 m)	27	
220	Rex Beach	1904 (silver)		1				27	
220	Gwynne Evans	1904 (bronze)		1				24	
220	Gus Goessling	1904 (bronze)		1				25	
220	David Hammond	1904 (silver)		1				23	
220	Charles Healy	1904 (silver)		1				20	
220	Frank Kehoe	1904 (silver)		1					
220	John Meyers	1904 (bronze)		1				24	
220	Bill Orthwein	1904 (bronze)		1				22	
220	Amedee Reyburn	1904 (bronze)		1				25	
220	Frank Schreiner	1904 (bronze)		1				25	
220	Jerome Steever	1904 (silver)		1				24	
220	Edwin Swatek	1904 (silver)		1				19	
220	Manfred Toeppen	1904 (bronze)		1				17	
220	Bill Tuttle	1904 (silver)		1				22	
220	Preston Steiger	1920		1				21	
220	Herbert Taylor	1920		1			5 ft 6.5 in (1.69 m)	28	
220	Wally O'Connor	1924 (bronze)		1	FP			20	
220	Johnny Weissmuller	1924 (bronze)		1	FP		6 ft 3 in (1.91 m)	20	
220	Paul Samson	1928		1	FP		6 ft 5.5 in (1.97 m)	23	
220	Johnny Weissmuller	1928		1	FP		6 ft 3 in (1.91 m)	24	
220	Dixon Fiske	1936		1	FP			21	
220	Fred Lauer	1936		1	GK			37	
220	Harold Dash	1948		1	FP			31	
220	Ken Hahn	1956		1	GK		6 ft 0 in (1.83 m)	28	
220	Chick McIlroy	1960		1	D/CF	R	5 ft 10.5 in (1.79 m)	22	
220	Ralph Whitney	1964	10	1	FP	R	5 ft 10.5 in (1.79 m)	27	
220	George Stransky	1964	11	1	GK	R	6 ft 2 in (1.88 m)	20	
220	Chris Dorst	1984 (silver)	13	1	GK		6 ft 3.5 in (1.92 m)	28	
220	Chris Duplanty	1992	3	1	GK		6 ft 2.5 in (1.89 m)	26	
220	Sean Nolan	2000	12	1	GK		6 ft 5.5 in (1.97 m)	28	
220	Genai Kerr	2004	12	1	GK		6 ft 7.5 in (2.02 m)	27	
220	Chay Lapin	2012	13	1	GK	R	6 ft 5.5 in (1.97 m)	25	
Rk	Player	Games	No.	MP	Pos	H	Height	Age	Ref

== See also ==
- United States men's Olympic water polo team statistics
  - United States men's Olympic water polo team statistics (appearances)
  - United States men's Olympic water polo team statistics (scorers)
  - United States men's Olympic water polo team statistics (goalkeepers)
  - United States men's Olympic water polo team statistics (medalists)
- List of United States men's Olympic water polo team rosters
- United States men's Olympic water polo team results
- United States men's national water polo team
