= USA Water Polo Hall of Fame =

Water polo hall of fame in California

The USA Water Polo Hall of Fame, located in Irvine, California, is a hall of fame dedicated to honoring players, coaches and officials who have contributed greatly to the game of water polo in the United States. It was established in 1976 by USA Water Polo, which is the national governing body in the country.

== Committee ==
- Brent Bohlender, Chair
- Adam Wright
- Brenda Villa
- Dion Gray
- Heather Moody
- Kirk Everist
- Natalie Golda Benson
- Scot Schulte

== Inductees ==
As of 2020, 230 individuals have been elected.

=== 1970s ===
==== Class of 1976 ====
1. Kenneth M. Beck
2. Lemoine S. Case
3. Austin R. Clapp
4. John J. Curren
5. Harold N. Dash
6. Phillip B. Daubenspeck
7. Dixon Fiske
8. Samuel J. Greller
9. Lou DeBrenda Handley
10. Robert E. Hughes
11. Edward L. Jaworski
12. William A. Kooistra
13. Michael J. McDermott
14. Perry McGillivray
15. Jay-Ehret Mahoney
16. Wallace O'Connor
17. John Robinson
18. Urho (Whitney) Saari
19. George E. Schroth
20. James R. Smith
21. Frank Sullivan
22. Vernon "Vern" Tittle
23. Herbert E. "Hal" Vollmer
24. Paul Wacker
25. Wallace P. "Wally" Wolf

==== Class of 1977 ====
1. Frederick Bassett
2. Marvin "Ace" D. Burns
3. Ronald Crawford
4. Joseph Farley
5. Robert Horn
6. Samuel Kooistra
7. John Miller
8. H. Jamison Handy
9. Joseph Ruddy
10. Raymond Ruddy
11. Ronald Severa

==== Class of 1979 ====
1. Arthur Austin
2. Charles Bittick
3. Ralph Budelman
4. James Gaughran
5. Fred Lauer

=== 1980s ===
==== Class of 1980 ====
1. Bob Bray
2. Harry A. Bisbey
3. Harry Hebner
4. Charles McCallister
5. Francis McDermott
6. Charles McIlroy
7. George Mitchell
8. R. Max Ritter
9. Clyde Swendsen
10. Donald Tierney

==== Class of 1981 ====
1. Robert Frojen
2. Donald Good
3. Neil Kohlhase
4. Charlie Schroeder
5. Albert Schwartz
6. John Spargo
7. Calvert Strong
8. William Vosburg

==== Class of 1982 ====
1. Carl Bauer
2. Steven Barnett
3. Andrew Burke
4. Elmer Collett
5. Kenneth Hahn
6. Arthur Koblish
7. Robert Koehler
8. Francis Moorman
9. John Parker
10. Roy Saari
11. Gary Sheerer
12. Anthony Van Dorp
13. Dean Willeford

==== Class of 1983 ====
1. David Ashleigh
2. Devere "Chris" Christensen
3. Charles Finn
4. William Kelly
5. Bruce Kidder
6. Edwin Knox
7. Richard "Hoot" Newman
8. William Ross
9. Burton Shaw
10. Herbert Wildman

==== Class of 1984 ====
1. Peter Asch
2. Bruce Bradley
3. Stanley Cole
4. James Ferguson
5. Robert Helmick
6. George Stransky
7. Russell Webb
8. Barry Weitzenberg

==== Class of 1985 ====
1. A. M. "Pete" Archer
2. Heber Holloway
3. Marty Hull
4. Arthur Lambert
5. Terry Sayring

==== Class of 1986 ====
1. David "Jay" Flood

==== Class of 1987 ====
1. Peter Schnugg

==== Class of 1988 ====
1. Eric Lindroth
2. Gus Sundstrom
3. George Van Cleaf

==== Class of 1989 ====
1. Frank F. Connor
2. Christopher "Chris" T. Dorst
3. Ogden Reid
4. John Siman
5. Jon Svendsen
6. William Hale Thompson

=== 1990s ===
==== Class of 1990 ====
1. John R. Felix
2. William "Bill" W.R. Schroeder
3. Ronald "Ron" L. Volmer
4. Otto Wahle

==== Class of 1991 ====
1. Andrew "Drew" McDonald
2. Timothy A. Shaw

==== Class of 1992 ====
1. Gary Figueroa
2. Robert K. "Bob" Gaughran
3. Becky Shaw
4. Joseph Michael "Joe" Vargas

==== Class of 1993 ====
1. William "Buck" Dawson
2. Barbara J. Kalbus
3. William "Eagle" McMarthy
4. Kenneth M. "Monte" Nitzkowski
5. James W. "Jim" Schultz

==== Class of 1994 ====
1. Arthur D. "Art" Adamson
2. Jules J. Ameno
3. Douglas Lambert "Doug" Burke
4. Jody D. Campbell
5. Charles B. "Shorty" Dwight III
6. Steven "Harpo" Hamann
7. Charles "Chuck" Metz
8. George Ratkovic
9. Kevin Robertson
10. Norton D. "Nort" Thorton

==== Class of 1995 ====
1. Paul "Bear" Barren
2. Peter J. "Pete" Cutino
3. Tom Hermstad

==== Class of 1996 ====
1. Charles H. "Charlie" Harris
2. Ralph W. Hale M.D.
3. Robert E. Lee Jr.

==== Class of 1997 ====
1. Andrew F. "Andy" Habermann
2. William U. "Bill" Harris
3. Stanley E. "Stan" Sprague
4. Kenneth "Ken" Lindgren

==== Class of 1998 ====
1. Greg Boyer
2. Richard J. Foster
3. Steve Heaston
4. Janice Krauser
5. Sandra H. "Sandy" Nitta

==== Class of 1999 ====
1. Jane Hale
2. Edward W. "Ed" Reed Jr.
3. Terry A. Schroeder
4. James "Jim" Slatton
5. Craig "Willy" Wilson

=== 2000s ===
==== Class of 2000 ====
1. William "Bill" Barnett
2. Peter Campbell
3. Dennis "Fos" Fosdick
4. William "Bill" Frady
5. Gordon "Gordie" Hall
6. Ken "Ham" Hamdorf
7. Richard F. "Doc" Hunkler
8. Douglas "Doug" Kimbell
9. Craig Klass
10. John D. Williams

==== Class of 2001 ====
1. Brent Bohlender
2. Jeffery Campbell
3. Christopher D. "Chris" Duplanty
4. Mike "Evo" Evans
5. Roger Nekton
6. Michael "Mike" Schofield
7. Scott Schulte
8. Mary Sprague

==== Class of 2002 ====
1. James Bergeson
2. Donald H. Clooney
3. Dante Dettamanti
4. Jeffery N. Heidmous
5. Dr. Alan Mouchawar

==== Class of 2003 ====
1. William K. Anttila
2. Laura Baker
3. Theresa Bixby
4. Richard Draz
5. Dion Gray
6. Frank Hassett
7. David A. Heck
8. Kathy Jo Horne
9. Lynn Comer Kachmarik
10. Kelvin Parker Kemp
11. Maureen "Mo" O'Toole

==== Class of 2004 ====
1. Kirk Everist
2. Vaune Kadlubek
3. Maggi Kelly
4. Walter "Wally" Lundt
5. James "Moose" Mulcrone
6. Alex Rousseau
7. Lynn Wittstock

=== 2010s ===
==== Class of 2010 ====
1. Bret Bernard
2. Heather Moody
3. Edward Rudloff
4. Kathy "Gubba" Sheehy
5. Peter Ueberroth
6. Jamey Wright

==== Class of 2011 ====
1. Robin Beauregard
2. Michael Garibaldi
3. Jennie Jacobsen-Huse
4. Kyle Kopp
5. Wolf Wigo

==== Class of 2012 ====
1. Bill Brown
2. Ellen Estes Lee
3. Margo Miranda

==== Class of 2014 ====
1. Edward Newland
2. Jim Sprague
3. Andy Takata
4. Sandy Vessey-Schneider

==== Class of 2015 ====
1. Natalie Golda Benson
2. Richard Corso
3. Amber Drury

==== Class of 2018 ====
1. Guy Baker
2. Scott Hinman
3. Chris Humbert
4. Heather Petri
5. Brenda Villa

==== Class of 2019 ====
1. Elizabeth Armstrong
2. Ryan Bailey
3. Jeff Powers
4. Jessica Steffens
5. John Tanner
6. Lauren Wenger
7. Adam Wright

=== 2020s ===
==== Class of 2020 ====
1. Gavin Arroyo
2. Gary Robinett
3. Kelly Rulon
4. Bruce Wigo
5. Elsie Windes

==== Class of 2021 ====
1. Courtney Mathewson
2. Kami Craig
3. Ericka Lorenz
4. Tony Azevedo
5. Merrill Moses

==== Class of 2022 ====
1. Layne Beaubien
2. Kelli Billish-Fitter
3. Bob Corb
4. Russ Hafferkamp
5. John Vargas

==== Class of 2023 ====
1. Aaron Chaney
2. Nicolle Payne
3. Ron Richison
4. Coralie Simmons
5. Peter Varellas

==== Class of 2024 ====
1. Kiley Neushul
2. Chris Oeding
3. Doug Peabody
4. Ken Smith

==== Class of 2025 ====
1. David Alberstein
2. Ricardo Azevedo
3. Denny Harper
4. Melissa Seidemann
5. Jesse Smith

==== Class of 2026 ====
1. Carin Crawford
2. Annika Dries
3. Peter Hudnut
4. Chris Judge

== See also ==
- Peter J. Cutino Award, another water polo award in the United States
- International Swimming Hall of Fame
- Water Polo Australia Hall of Fame
