= William Ross (water polo) =

American water polo player (1928–2021)

Personal information
- Full name: William Donald Ross II
- Nationality: Canadian-born American citizen
- Born: July 6, 1928 Toronto, Canada
- Died: August 21, 2021 (aged 93) West Vancouver, B.C., Canada
- Occupations: Banking, Banking executive
- Height: 198 cm (6 ft 6 in)
- Weight: 91 kg (201 lb)
- Relatives: William Donald Ross, grandfather

Sport
- Sport: Water polo
- College team: University of Southern California
- Club: Southern California Water Polo Club (SCWPC)
- Coached by: Urho Saari Asst. Coach (SCWPC); Neal Kohlhase (SCWPC, Olympics)
Medal record
Representing United States
Pan American Games
| Silver medal – second place | 1955 Mexico City | Men's tournament |

William "Bill" Donald Ross (July 6, 1928 – August 21, 2021), was an American water polo player who competed for the University of Southern California and participated in water polo at the 1956 Melbourne Olympics. After graduating the University of Southern California with a Business degree, he would have a career in banking, and as a President of the Saving and Loan Association of Santa Ynez, California.

== Early life ==
Ross was born July 6, 1928 in Toronto, Ontario, Canada at Government House, the official home of the Lieutenant Governor of Ontario Canada. Bill was the only child of Marie Bowen Carpenter and Donald Gordon Ross, who divorced and separated when he was young. Ross's grandfather, William Donald Ross, for whom he was named, served as a Canadian Deputy Minister of Finance around 1900, as the acting Lieutenant Governor of Ontario, Canada when Bill was born, and as a banker.

Ross attended Hamilton High School, part of greater Los Angeles's West Side.

== University Southern California ==
Enrolling in 1948, and graduating in 1955 with a Business degree, Ross competed in water polo and swimming for the University of Southern California where he made All American honors in both 1950 and 1951 and captained the team from 1949 to 1951. In swimming, he specialized in breast stroke. In both 1948 and 1951, he made All-Conference honors while at USC.

In 1951, Ross married Virginia Wilson in Los Angeles, another student at USC, with the couple having four children by 1960. They divorced in 1966. Ross would have four additional marriages.

Before completing college at USC, in the early 1950's Ross served with the US Navy during the Korean War era and was stationed at Southern California's Los Alamitos Naval Air Station, known for access to aquatic training and competition.

In national championship play, in 1952, he played on the water polo team that won the Sr. National outdoor Championship, and in 1957 played on the water polo team that won the Sr. National Indoor Championship. He made the AAU All American team for outdoor water polo play in both 1955 and 1956.

In international competition, Ross was part of the US National water polo team that captured a silver team medal at the Pan American Games in 1955 in Ciudad de México.

== 1956 Olympic trials ==
Ross qualified for the 1956 Olympics at the Olympic trials in Los Angeles, California while playing with the Southern California Water Polo Club. Teammates on the club included Wally Wolf, future USC Coach Ronald Severa, future Stanford Coach James Gaughran, and goal keeper Bob Horn, who later become both an Olympic coach and a highly successful water polo coach at the University of California Los Angeles. The strong team from the Illinois Athletic Club lodged a protest, having tied the Southern California WP Club 6-6 in a final game, but the judges disallowed the protest, as the Southern California Water Polo Club had the larger number of tournament goals.

== 1956 Melbourne Olympics ==
Ross was a member of the American water polo team which finished fifth in the 1956 Olympic water polo tournament in Melbourne, Australia under Head Olympic Coach Neal Kohlhase and Assistant Coach Urho Saari, both Water Polo Hall of Fame members. Ross played all six matches, and as a starter played every minute of each game. Hungary took the gold, Yugoslavia took the silver, and the Russian team captured the bronze. A well-publicized feature of the tournament was a very rough match between pre-Olympic favorite Hungary and Russia that had to be stopped by the referees. On December 6, the Hungarian team won their final gold medal match against Russia by a score of 4-0, and went undefeated in the tournament, but considerable animosity existed between the Russian and Hungarian teams as a result of the recent Russian occupation of Hungary in November 1956, subsequent to a student revolt in the same month. Referees stopped the game late in the fourth quarter with the score 4-0 to protect the players.

== Careers and avocations ==
In service to the water polo community, Ross worked with the Water Polo Committee of the Southern Pacific Amateur Athletic Union, and from 1981-1984 served as an advisor to the Committee on the Sports Commission in charge of the Olympic Games in 1984.

In career pursuits, like his grandfather for whom he was named, Ross worked in banking. He served as President of the Saving and Loan Association of Santa Ynez, California, with his banking career firmly established by the early to mid-1960's.

In the 1990s, he married his fifth wife and moved to Canada's West Vancouver in British Columbia.

Ross died August 21, 2021 at 93 in West Vancouver, British Columbia. Funeral services were conducted by Hollyburn Funeral Home.

== Honors ==
In 1983, he was inducted into the USA Water Polo Hall of Fame.
