= Kenneth Beck =

American water polo player (1915–1982)

- Beck at 33, from 1948 U.S. Olympic team photo

Personal information
- Full name: Kenneth Melwyn Beck
- Born: April 19, 1915 Lovelock, Nevada, U.S.
- Died: May 1, 1982 (aged 67) Arcadia, California, U.S.
- Spouse: Ruth J. Beck

Sport
- Sport: Water polo
- Club: Los Angeles Athletic Club
- Coached by: Austin Clapp, (1948 Olympics)

Kenneth Melwyn Beck (April 19, 1915 – May 1, 1982) was an American water polo player who competed with the U.S. team at the Summer Olympics in 1936 and 1948. He later had a long career as a detective with the Los Angeles Police Department.

Beck was born in Lovelock, Nevada on April 19, 1995. He played water polo for Southern California's Inglewood High School in Los Angeles. He greatly improved his skills playing for the highly competitive Los Angeles Athletic Club (LAAC) from 1930–1948, where he served on teams that won the AAU Sr. National Outdoor Championship in both 1941, and 1947. By June 1947, he played with several outstanding fellow Los Angeles area Water Polo players on the LAAC who would compete with him as team mates on the 1948 U.S. Olympic team including Bob Bray of Fullerton Jr. College, Lee Case of USC, and Devere Christensen and Dixon Fiske of UCLA.

== Olympic competitor ==
=== 1936 Berlin Olympics ===
Beck competed at the August 10, Summer Olympics in 1936 in Berlin where the U.S. Water Polo team placed ninth. The Americans were eliminated from play by a hard fought 4–3 loss against the Belgian team. The U.S. attempted a late comeback, against a difficult 4–0 deficit at halftime, and in the later part of the second half managed to score three quick goals. Though they had many goal attempts in the closing minutes of the game, they could not equal the score. Beck played Center and received two penalties in a game where the U.S. team believed the referee failed to call apparent penalties on the Belgian team.

=== 1948 London Olympics ===
In the 1948 London Olympics, the U.S. Water Polo team, composed largely of players from the Los Angeles Athletic Club, was eliminated by a loss to Sweden, though Beck scored and performed well. Italy won the gold medal, Hungary the silver, and the team from the Netherlands won the bronze, in a period when European teams particularly Eastern European teams usually dominated water polo. The U.S. team was coached by former Olympian Austin Clapp. Though the U.S. won their first game against the team from Uruguary 7-0, and then had a tie game with the strong team from Belgium that ended in a score of 4-4, they lost their critical match with Sweden in a 7-0 shutout, and were eliminated from further rounds. The U.S. team ended competition with a ninth place ranking.

== Later life and death ==
After his water polo career, he was a homicide detective for 33 years with the Los Angeles Police Department.

Beck died at Arcadia Methodist Hospital in Arcadia, California, on May 1, 1982, at the age of 67. He was buried in Rose Hills Memorial Park, and was survived by his wife Ruth J. Beck and two daughters.

== Honors ==
In 1976, he was inducted into the USA Water Polo Hall of Fame.
