= Richard Greenberg (disambiguation) =

Richard Greenberg (1958–2025) was an American playwright and television writer.

Richard Greenberg may also refer to:

- Richard Greenberg (water polo) (1902–1978), American water polo player
- Richard Alan Greenberg (1947–2018), American designer of special effects
- Richard Greenberg (director), American director and screenwriter of Desert Saints
