= Michael Schofield (water polo) =

Biographical details
- Born: October 14, 1956
- Education: University of Pittsburgh

Playing career
- 1975-1979: University of Pittsburgh

Coaching career (HC unless noted)
- 1985-2013: United States Naval Academy
- 1991-1993: US National WP Team Asst.

Head coaching record
- Overall: 586-230 .718 Win % (1985-2013 US Naval Academy)

Accomplishments and honors

Championships
- 9 Eastern Championships (USNA)

Awards
- National Coach of the Year (2004); Eastern Championship Coach of Tournament; USA Water Polo Hall of Fame

Michael Schofield was the head coach for the water polo team at the United States Naval Academy from 1985 to 2013, where he led the team to nine Eastern Championships of the Collegiate Water Polo Association during his twenty-nine year coaching tenure, and thirteen NCAA water polo tournaments.

== University of Pittsburgh ==
Schofield played for the University of Pittsburgh water polo team, attending from 1975 to 1979, where he served as Captain and received his Bachelor's of Science in 1979. While playing for the team in 1976, Pittsburgh beat Bucknell University, to take the Mid-Atlantic Conference title. While playing for Pitt, Schofield led the team to their only appearance in the NCAA Championship in 1976.

Schofield served in the United States Navy, achieving the rank of Ensign.

== Coaching US Naval Academy ==
He joined the staff of the United States Naval Academy as an Assistant Coach in 1982, and was promoted to the head coaching position in 1985. While at the Academy, Schofield taught Physical Education. He was named National Coach of the Year in 2004, and became the Naval Academy's most winning coach, compiling a career record of 586-230 from 1985 through 2013. He led the Academy team to nine Eastern Championships, and was an All-Eastern Championship Tournament Coach Selection in the years 1986, 1990, 2000, 2003, 2006, 2007, and 2010. During his years as Assistant Water Polo Coach, he was mentored by long serving Naval Academy Coach Lee Lawrence who coached the Water Polo team from 1982 to 1984, and coached the Academy's swim team from 1967 to 2003. Lawrence had formerly swum for Staunton Military Academy and Springfield College.

Schofield's Naval Academy athletes performed well as scholars, with 57 players receiving Association of Collegiate Water Polo Coaches All-Academic honors from the 2001 through the 2013 season.

During his tenure at the Naval Academy, he also coached the Naval Academy Aquatic Club, a youth program for water polo players and swimmers, beginning in 1982. He retired from coaching the US Naval Academy in the fall of 2013.

=== US National team coach ===
On the international level, he coached the U.S. National Water Polo Team at the World University Games in 1997 to finish in fifth-place. He was an Assistant Coach for the National Team in 1992, and served as an assistant coach at the World University Games for the U.S. Water Polo Team that won gold medals in 1991 and 1993.

Schofield was married to wife Gina, and the couple had two children.

=== Honors ===
In 2001, he was inducted into the USA Water Polo Hall of Fame.
