= George Stransky =

American water polo player (born 1944)

Personal information
- Full name: George Charles Stransky
- Born: January 16, 1944 (age 82) Stockbridge, Massachusetts, U.S.
- Education: Stanford University; Baylor College of Medicine (1969)
- Occupations: Physician, ob-gyn specialty
- Height: 188 cm (6 ft 2 in)
- Weight: 77 kg (170 lb)
- Spouse: Debra Kay Walters (m. 1986)

Sport
- Sport: Water polo
- Position: Goalkeeper (WP)
- College team: Stanford University
- Club: Foothill Athletic Association; Olympic Club, San Francisco; Anchorage Water Polo Club
- Coached by: James Gaughran (Stanford); Art Lambert (Foothill Athletic); Urho Saari (64 Olympics)

George Charles Stransky (born January 16, 1944) is an American former water polo player who competed for Stanford University. He participated in the men's water polo tournament at the 1964 Tokyo Olympics. Graduating Houston's Baylor School of Medicine in 1969, after completing an ob-gyn residency, he served as an Army surgeon, and later had an ob-gyn practice in Anchorage, Alaska, specializing in women's gynecologic cancer. Remaining active, he participated in US Master's Water Polo in Anchorage, played for the Anchorage Water Polo team, and competed in triathlons.

== Early life ==
George Stransky was born January 16, 1944, in Stockbridge, Massachusetts to father Roy Stransky and mother Fritzy. After a family move to California, Stransky spent his teens in Los Altos, California, and attended the large Covington Junior High School in Los Altos, where he graduated on June 12, 1957. He later attended Los Altos High School, where he played water polo from around 1957-1960, graduating in 1960. In December, 1959, Stransky was a First Team All-Santa Clara Valley Athletic League honoree in water polo, along with two of his High School team mates. In December, 1957, with Stransky playing goalie for Los Altos High, the team placed first in the Western Santa Clara Valley Water Polo Championship.

== Stanford University ==
Stransky attended Stanford University where he competed and trained in water polo from around 1960-1964, primarily under Head Coach James Gaughran, a Water Polo Hall of Fame and International Swimming Hall of Fame inductee. In 1963, Stransky was part of Stanford's National Water Polo Championship team, under Coach Gaughran. While serving as Stanford's goalkeeper, Stransky was selected as a First Team All-Big Six AAWU Conference First team honoree in 1963.

In club play, Stransky competed for the Olympic Club of San Francisco, and the Foothill Athletic Association Water Polo team, where one of his primary coaches was Art Lambert, from around 1964-1966.

In August, 1964, Stransky was selected for the 15 person training group for the 1964 Tokyo Olympics, that would eventually be reduced to eleven players prior to the Tokyo Games.

== 1964 Tokyo Olympics ==
Stransky competed in Olympic men's water polo tournament at the 1964 Tokyo Olympics, under Head Coach Urho Saari, where the U.S. team tied for ninth place, and he played goaltender in a few matches. The water polo team performed above expectations in preliminary rounds, as Stransky's team mates initially selected for the 1964 team included many talented American players including brothers Paul, Ned and Chick McIlroy, Ralph Whitney, and Coach Urho Saari's son Bob Saari.

In their first game, the Americans lost to a strong, tall and dominant team from Yugoslavia 2-1, where water polo was a major sport. The U.S. team was tied 1-1 with the team from Yugoslavia throughout the first half, with the Yugoslavians not taking the winning shot until the last four minutes of play in the second half, winning the game 2-1, as noted earlier. In their second game, the American team defeated the team from Brazil 7-1, but were subsequently defeated 4-6 by the team from the Netherlands, losing their chance to advance to the semi-finals. In an unusual twist, in the losing game against the Netherlands American goalie Tony Van Dorp, played against his brother Fred van Dorp, who split goal tending responsibilities with Stransky. Tony Van Dorp had played for the Dutch Team before coming to America and gaining citizenship in 1957. After semi-final play, pre-games favorite Hungary took the gold medal, Yugoslavia took the silver, and the Soviet Union took the bronze.

=== National championships ===
Earning All American honors, while playing goaltender for the Foothill Aquatic Water Polo Club under Coach Art Lambert in 1965-1966, he was part of two consecutive Senior National Outdoor Championship water polo teams.

=== Honors ===
In 1984, he was inducted into the USA Water Polo Hall of Fame.

== Later life and careers ==
After graduating Stanford, Stransky studied at Houston's Baylor College of Medicine where he completed an MD degree in 1969, graduating with honors. He then finished an obstetrics and gynecology residence at Baylor.

Stransky first served as an Army surgeon, and had a practice at Panama's School of the Americas. In 1980 he moved to Anchorage, Alaska, and began an ob-gyn practice. In Anchorage, he specialized in women's gynecologic cancer. At the University of Washington, he worked as an obstetrics-gynecology professor.

On October 26, 1986, Stransky married Debra Kay Walters in a candlelight ceremony at their home in Anchorage, Alaska. Walters had worked at Providence Hospital and had a young daughter who acted as a flower girl.

=== Masters Athlete ===
Remaining active as an athlete, he participated in United States Masters Water Polo receiving Honors as a Male Water Polo Masters Athlete of the year, while a member of the Anchorage Water Polo Club in 2017. An endurance athlete, he was an eight-time finisher of the Iron Man triathlon.

== See also ==
- List of men's Olympic water polo tournament goalkeepers
