= James Carson (water polo) =

American water polo player (1901–1964)

- Carson, 1920's in "winged O" jersey of the Olympic Club

Personal information
- Full name: James Gilmore Carson
- Born: July 30, 1901 San Francisco, California, US
- Died: May 13, 1964 (aged 62) San Francisco, California, US
- Occupations: Physician, surgeon
- Spouse: Felicia Miekle

Sport
- Sport: Water polo
- College team: University of California (WP)
- Club: Olympic Club; San Francisco, CA
- Coached by: Sydney S. Cavill (Olympic Club)

James Gilmore Carson (July 30, 1901 – May 13, 1964) was an American water polo player. He competed in the men's water polo tournament at the 1920 Antwerp Olympics. He later became a Physician, and served in the Navy during WWII as a surgeon.

Carson was born July 30, 1901 to Catherine Carson and father John Bernard Carson in San Francisco. After High School, he attended the University of California where he competed on their swimming and water polo teams. He later attended Stanford University.

An accomplished distance swimmer, in July, 1920, Carson placed first in the one-mile open water swim at Capitola Beach with a time of 22:12. Carson trained and competed in swimming and water polo for San Francisco's Olympic Club where he was managed by Coach Sydney S. Cavill.

== 1920 Antwerp Olympics ==
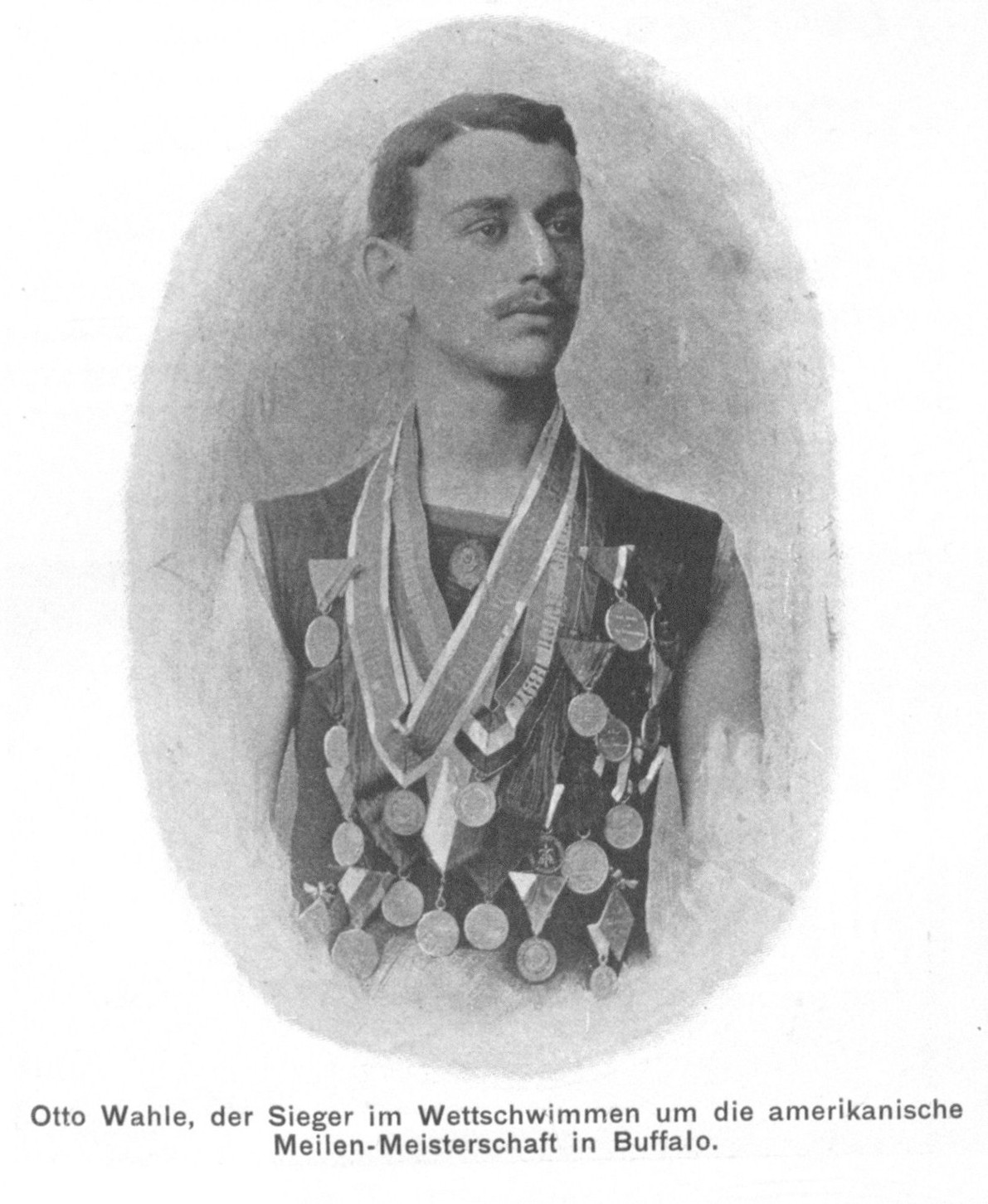
Coach Otto Wahle

Carson was part of the American water polo team in the 1920 Antwerp Olympics which finished fourth in the Olympic Men's water polo tournament. The US water polo team was coached by Austrian-born American swimmer Otto Wahle, a 1900 and 1904 Olympic medalist and Water Polo Hall of Fame inductee. Great Britain, and the hometown team from Belgium were early favorites to medal in the tournament. The American team defeated Greece in the first Water Polo Match of the Quarterfinals 7-0, on August 24, but lost to Great Britain in the Semi-finals 7-2, eliminating them from the final round. The U.S. team later defeated Belgium 7-2 in a consolation round to determine the 2nd to 5th place finishers. Great Britain took the gold medal, Belgium took the silver, and Sweden took the bronze.

After completing medical school, he had a career as a physician and surgeon. Carson served with the US Navy during WWII and obtained the rank of Lieutenant Commander.

While already practicing as a physician, Carson married Felicia Miekle on September 1, 1929 at San Francisco's St. Vincent de Paul Church. His son James Carson Jr. also became a physician.

He died at age 62 in on May 13, 1964 in San Francisco, the place of his birth, and was buried at San Francisco's Golden Gate National Cemetery.
