= Preston Steiger =

American water polo player (1898–1931)

- Steiger wearing the winged "O" Jersey of the Olympic Club, circa 1920

Personal information
- Born: September 6, 1898 San Francisco, California, U.S.
- Died: November 13, 1931 (aged 33) San Francisco, California, U. S.
- Occupation: Insurance sales
- Spouse: Myrtle

Sport
- Sport: Swimming, Water polo
- Position: Goalkeeper (WP)
- Club: Olympic Club (San Francisco)
- Coached by: Sydney S. Cavill (Olympic Club); Otto Wahle, (20 Olympics)

Preston Steiger (September 6, 1898 – November 13, 1931) was an American swimmer and water polo player. He participated in the men's tournament at the 1920 Summer Olympics, and later had a career in insurance sales.

== Early life ==
Steiger was born September 6, 1898, in San Francisco to Mr. and Mrs. Louis A. Steiger. Steiger's father Louis worked for the Bethleham Shipbuilding Corporation. Steiger attended Crocker Grammar School, graduating in December 1912 at the age of fourteen. First joining at 18, he competed in handball, swimming and water polo for the strong program at San Francisco's Olympic Club where he was coached by Sydney S. Cavill. Cavill was an Australian swimming champion, from a renowned Australian swimming family who were members of the International Swimming Hall of Fame. Steiger played the important position of goaltender in water polo during his career with the Olympic Club In addition to excelling in water polo, Steiger became well known for swimming the 25-yard freestyle, breaking the record of Hawaiian Olympian Duke Kahanamoku. Representing the Olympic Club at the July 21, 1917 Neptune Beach Swimming Championship, Steiger won the 50-yard freestyle event in 26 seconds.

== 1920 Antwerp Olympics ==
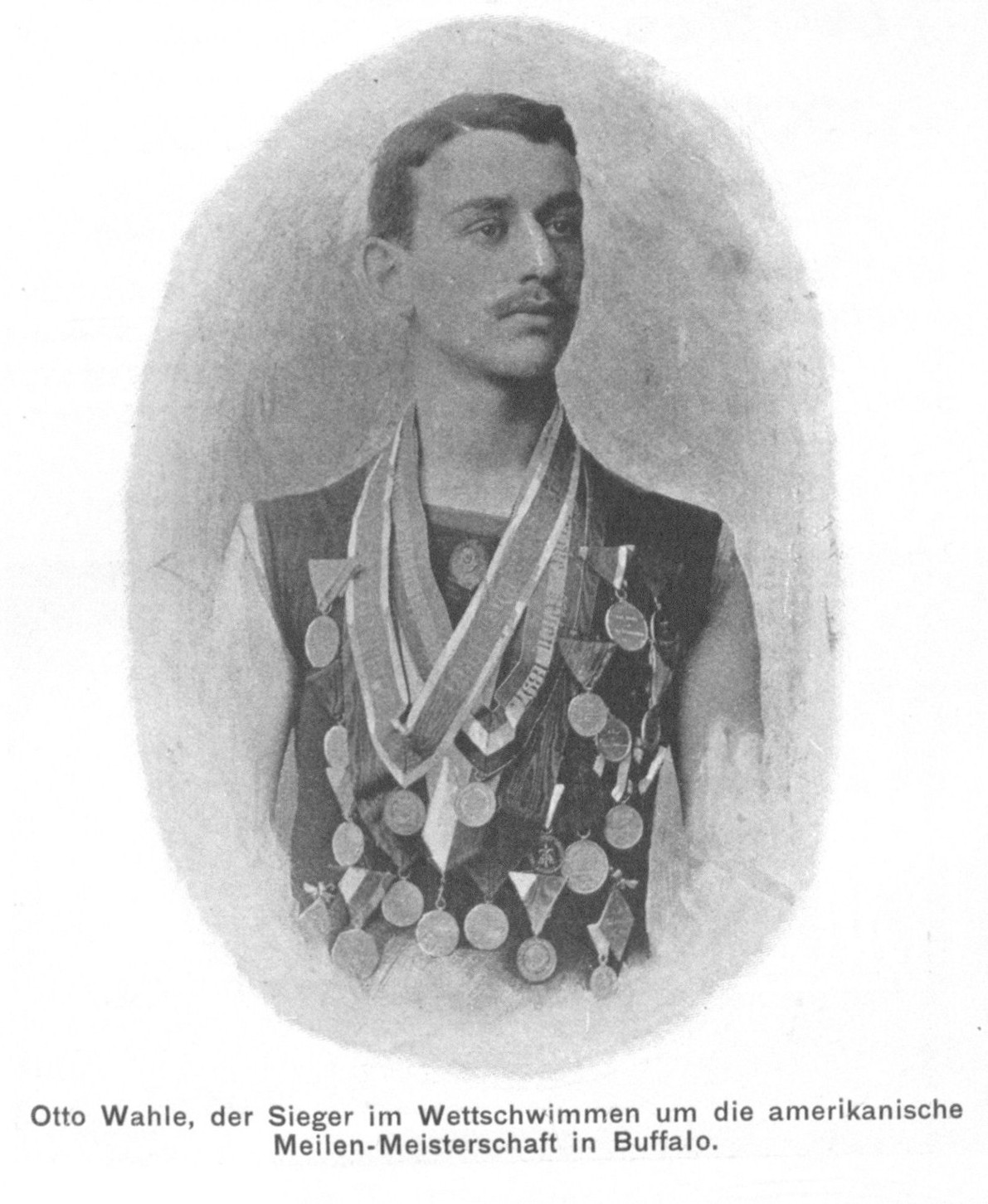
Coach Otto Wahle

Steiger was part of the American water polo team in the 1920 Antwerp Olympics which finished fourth in the Olympic tournament. The US water polo team was coached by Austrian-born American swimmer Otto Wahle, a 1900 and 1904 Olympian and Water Polo Hall of Fame inductee. Great Britain, and the hometown team from Belgium were early favorites to medal in the tournament. The American team defeated Greece in the first Water Polo Match of the Quarterfinals 7-0, on August 24, but lost to Great Britain in the Semi-finals 7-2, eliminating them from the final round. The U.S. team later defeated Belgium 7–2 in a consolation round to determine the 2nd to 5th-place finishers. Great Britain took the gold medal, Belgium took the silver, and Sweden took the bronze. Duke Kahanamaku, and Norman Ross, who would become a sports journalist and announcer, were well known swimmers who competed with Steiger on the 1920 water polo team.

=== Military and careers ===
In 1917, Steiger apprenticed as a seaman, and was a WWI Navy veteran.

Steiger later worked as a salesman, with an established career in insurance.

Around 1927, he was involved in an auto accident that left a few lingering injuries. He died at the age of only 33 at a San Francisco Hospital on November 13, 1931, of what many accounts describe as tuberculosis. He was survived by his wife Myrtle.

== See also ==
- List of men's Olympic water polo tournament goalkeepers
