= Dean Willeford =

American water polo player (born 1944)

Personal information
- Full name: Leslie Dean Willeford
- Born: October 9, 1944 (age 81) Dallas, Texas, United States
- Occupation: Business Manager (BDS Consulting)

Sport
- Sport: Swimming, Water polo
- Position: Field (WP)
- College team: University of Southern California
- Club: Commerce Water Polo; Philips 66 Water Polo; Long Beach Water Polo
- Coached by: Bill Sexton (Downey High School); Ronald Severa (USC Water Polo); Peter Daland (USC swimming); Art Lambert (68 Olympics); M. Nitzkowski (68 Olympics)

Leslie Dean Willeford (born October 9, 1944) is a former American swimmer and water polo player who competed for the University of Southern California. He participated in the men's water polo tournament at the 1968 Mexico City Olympics.

Willeford was born October 9, 1944 in Dallas, Texas, and after a family move attended Downey High School in greater Los Angeles. At Downey High, in October, 1962, he received All-American honors playing water polo, and had a first-place ranking in average points per game with 3.8. Willeford led the team to an 11-0 record in October 1962, with the expectation the team would contend for the City title that year, as well as the Moore League title. He played water polo for Commerce Water Polo Club, and Phillips 66 Water Polo Club in Long Beach, California from around 1962-1967. While swimming for Downey High, he helped lead the team to a California Interscholastic Federation second place finish in 1961 for the Southern Section, and in 1962, a CIF Championship in 1962. In High School, he competed in water polo under coach Bill Sexton.

== University of Southern California ==
Willeford attended the University of Southern California from around 1964-1968, where he was a water polo All-American from 1965-66, and swam on a 300-yard freestyle relay event that helped take USC to their sixth consecutive AAWU swimming championship on March 5, 1966. In swimming, he was coached by Peter Daland, and in water polo by former Olympian and USC athlete Ronald Severa. During his water polo career, he was part of the Senior National Outdoor Championship team in the consecutive years 1962-1963, and 1965-1967. Swimming for USC in 1965, he set a meet record time of 1:47.6 in the 200 freestyle at the AAWU Swim Championship.

== Pan Am medals ==
In international competition, Willeford was part of the US National team that won a silver medal at the Pan American games in Sao Paulo, Brazil in 1963, and a gold medal at the Pan American games in 1967 in Winnipeg, Canada.

== 1968 Mexico City Olympics ==
Willeford participated with the U.S. team at the 1968 Mexico City Olympics in the Olympic water polo tournament under Head Olympic water polo coach Art Lambert and Assistant Coach Monte Nitzkowski. The U.S. team finished fifth overall among the fifteen countries competing. The 1968 Olympics were similar to the previous four Olympics in that the dominant teams from Hungary, Yugoslavia, the Soviet Union, and Italy made the semi-finals. In the end, Yugoslavia won the gold, the Soviet Union the silver, and Hungary took the bronze. Willeford played in all of the eight matches in which the U.S. team competed, and scored a goal in the 10-5 victory over Brazil, and another in the team's 7-5 victory over the strong team from West Germany. In games that ended their chances for a medal, on October 19, the US team lost to pre-game favorite Hungary 5-1, and on October 21, lost 8-3 to the strong team from the Soviet Union.

=== Honors ===
In 1982, he was inducted into the USA Water Polo Hall of Fame.

=== Careers ===
In his early career, he sold stocks and worked with a mortgage broker, and was a CEO of the Yellow Pages firm United Publishers. In later career pursuits, in the mid-1980's, he was a founder and CEO of the BDS Consulting Group of Reno, Nevada, which helped small, young companies to succeed in their early growth cycle. He has been an author of books in the field of sales and entrepreneurship, and has given speeches and seminars on both subjects.
