= Jeff Powers =

American water polo player (born 1980)

Jeffery
Personal information
- Born: Jeffrey Powers; January 21, 1980 (age 46) Chattanooga, Tennessee, U.S.
- Height: 6 ft 7 in (2.01 m)
- Weight: 238

Sport
- Country: United States
- Sport: Water Polo
Medal record
Men's water polo
Representing the United States
Olympic Games
Silver medal – second place	2008 Beijing	Team
Pan American Games
Gold medal – first place	2011 Guadalajara	Team

Jeff Powers (born January 21, 1980) is an American retired water polo player.

== Career ==
=== High school ===
Powers attended San Luis Obispo High School, where he played on the water polo team. He was named to the All-CIF team twice.

=== College ===
Powers played on the UC Irvine water polo team. He was a first team All-American in 2000, 2001, and 2002.

=== International ===
Powers scored four goals at the 2001 FINA World Championships. He scored six goals, tied for the team lead, at the 2002 FINA World Cup. At the 2003 Pan American Games, he had a hat trick in the gold medal game, which the U.S. won. He played at the 2004 Summer Olympics, and the U.S. finished seventh.

Powers scored 10 goals at the 2005 FINA World Championships. The U.S. won the 2007 Pan American Games, and Powers scored seven goals. At the 2008 Summer Olympics, he scored six goals and helped the U.S. win the silver medal.

Powers scored five goals at both the 2009 FINA World Championships and the 2010 FINA World Cup. The U.S. won the 2011 Pan American Games, and Powers led the team with 11 goals. He scored five times at the 2012 Summer Olympics, and the U.S. finished in eighth place.

=== Professional ===
From 2004 to 2011, Powers played professionally in Greece, Italy, and Hungary: Vasas-Plaket TeVa.

== Awards ==
In 2019, Powers was inducted into the USA Water Polo Hall of Fame.

== Personal life ==
Powers is 6 feet, 7 inches tall. He lives in San Luis Obispo, California.

Powers' brother Steve played water polo for Purdue University. Powers is currently the head coach of swimming and water polo at St. John Bosco High School (Bellflower, CA)

== See also ==
- List of Olympic medalists in water polo (men)
