= Dave Ashleigh =

American water polo player (born 1943)

Personal information
- Full name: David Michael Ashleigh
- Born: August 8, 1943 (age 82) Pomona, California, United States
- Occupations: Collegiate water polo coach * Modesto Junior College
- Height: 183 cm (6 ft 0 in)
- Weight: 77 kg (170 lb)

Sport
- Sport: Water polo
- College team: Cerritos College; University California Los Angeles
- Club: Phillips 66 WP Club; Inland Nu-Pike Club
- Coached by: Bob Horn (UCLA); Urho Saari (64 Olympics); Art Lambert (68 Olympics)

David "Dave" Michael Ashleigh (born August 8, 1943) is a former American water polo player who competed for the University of California Los Angeles. He participated in the 1964 Summer Olympics and the 1968 Summer Olympics. He later served as a Water polo and swimming coach for Modesto College.

Ashleigh was born August 8, 1943 in Pomona, California. He attended Whittier High School in Whittier, California, graduating in June, 1961. He played for Whittier High School's Class A Water Polo team in 1959, completing a nearly undefeated season. As a High School Junior at Whittier in 1960, Ashleigh lowered the Class B Division school breaststroke record, and set school records in both the Class A and Class B Individual Medley event. By 1960, Ashleigh competed in water polo for Whittier Coach Frank Poucher. In 1959, Whitier won the CIF Championship under Coach Poucher with a 5–2 win over El Segundo High School coached by Urho Saari, a US Olympic coach.

Subsequent to his time in collegiate competition, he competed and trained with clubs from 1963 to 1968, with both the Phillips 66 Water Polo Club and the Inland-Nu-Pike Water Polo Club.

== Cerritos College ==
For his first two years of collegiate education, Ashleigh attended Norwalk's Cerritos College where in 1963, he was named Athlete of the Year for his performance on the school's varsity water polo team, and was a Community College All American in 1961 and 1962. During Ashleigh's tenure with the team, Cerritos won the State Junior College Water Polo Championships, and in the following year finished second.

== University of California Los Angeles ==
He completed his education at the University of California Los Angeles, where he swam and played water polo for former Olympian and Hall of Fame inductee Bob Horn from 1963 to 1966. Ashleigh took time off in 1964 to train and attend the Olympics. In 1965, UCLA won the college national championship, and were unbeaten in collegiate competition. Skilled in both freestyle distance and multi-stroke events as a UCLA swimmer, he set University records in the 1650 yard freestyle, the 200-yard backstroke, the 500-yard freestyle, and the 400 Individual Medley. In 1965 and 1963, he earned All American honors from the NCAA in water polo. In both 1966 and 1965, UCLA won both NCAA championships and Pacific-8 conference championships. Ashleigh received All-American honors in his signature events of the 200 breaststroke and 400 Individual Medley.

Ashleigh was a member of the U.S. National water polo team from 1964 to 1968, and was part of two American Olympic squads. In international non-Olympic competition, at the 1967 Pan American games in Winnipeg, Canada, he helped lead the US team to a gold medal.

== 1964 Tokyo Olympics ==
Ashleigh participated in the 1964 Olympics with the U.S. team under Olympic Head Coach Urho Saari. The 1964 squad was eliminated in the first round of the 1964 Olympic water polo tournament in Tokyo, finishing in ninth place overall among thirteen competing countries. Members of the team included the brothers Paul, Ned and Chick McIlroy, Ralph Whitney, and Urho Saari's son Bob Saari. In their first game, the Americans lost 2–1 to a strong, tall and dominant team from Yugoslavia, where water polo was a major sport. The U.S. team was tied 1–1 with the team from Yugoslavia throughout the first half, with the Yugoslavians not taking the winning shot until the last four minutes of play in the second half. In their next game, the American team defeated the team from Brazil 7-1, but were subsequently defeated 4–6 by the team from the Netherlands, losing their chance to advance to the semi-finals. In an unusual twist, in the losing game against the Netherlands American goalie Tony Van Dorp, played against his brother Fred van Dorp. Tony Van Dorp had played for the Dutch Team before coming to America and gaining citizenship in 1957. After semi-final play, pre-games and perennial favorite Hungary took the gold medal, Yugoslavia took the silver, and the Soviet Union took the bronze.

== 1968 Mexico City Olympics ==
Four years later as Captain, he participated with the U.S. team at the 1968 Mexico City Olympics in the 1968 Olympic water polo tournament under Head Olympic water polo coach Art Lambert. The U.S. team finished fifth overall among the fifteen countries competing. The 1968 Olympics were similar to the previous four Olympics in that the dominant teams from Hungary, Yugoslavia, the Soviet Union, and Italy made the semi-finals. In the end, Yugoslavia won the gold, the Soviet Union the silver, and Hungary took the bronze.

=== Careers ===
Beginning around 1968, Ashleigh coached water polo at the Modesto Swim and Racquet Club which won the 16 and under Bay area championships during his coaching tenure. In 1970, while coaching the Modesto Racquet Club, Ashleigh taught at La Loma Junior High School. From 1970 to 1992, he coached water polo and swimming at Modesto Junior College, where he brought the team to 11 Conference Water Polo Championships. A winning team, the 1983 Modesto Junior College team went 11-1.

=== Honors ===
In 1983, he was inducted into the USA Water Polo Hall of Fame. For his collegiate performances in both water polo and swimming, he was inducted into the UCLA Hall of Fame in 2010.
