= Edward Jaworski =

American water polo player (1926–2008)

Edward Jaworksi
- A youthful Jaworski in water polo cap #3

Personal information
- Full name: Edward Lawrence Jaworski
- Nationality: USA
- Born: March 11, 1926 Classon Point, New York City
- Died: August 20, 2008 (aged 82) Elizaville, New York, United States
- Education: Columbia College
- Occupations: Coach; Construction engineer
- Spouse: Julie

Sport
- Sport: Water polo
- Club: New York Athletic Club
- Coached by: Robert Schroeder (NYAC); Orho Saari (Olympics)

Edward Lawrence Jaworski (March 11, 1926 – August 20, 2008) was an American water polo player who competed with the U.S. team in the 1952 Summer Olympics in Helsinki, Finland. After graduating Columbia with an engineering degree in 1949, he worked in the construction industry initially for Columbia, his alma mater, and later ascended to the Presidency of the Catamount Construction Company.

Jaworski was born in Classon Point in the Bronx in greater New York City on March 11, 1926.

After high school, he served with the U.S. Army in the second World War.

== Columbia College ==
Jaworski attended Columbia College initially as part of the class of 1946 and graduated with a B.S. from the Columbia School of Engineering and Applied Science in 1949.

== National achievements in water polo ==
He was part of the AAU Senior National outdoor Championship team in 1954, 1956, and 1961. In indoor water polo, he was part of the AAU Senior National Championship team in 1952, 1953, 1958, 1963, and 1965. Playing with the New York Athletic Club under Coach Robert Shroeder, Jaworski's NYAC team won the North American Cup Championship in late March 1965. It was the third straight NA Cup Championship for New York Athletic.

== 1952 Helsinki Olympics ==
Jaworski, who played in eight matches, at age 26 was the oldest member of the American water polo team which finished fourth in the 1952 Helsinki Olympics. With a total of 21 countries participating, the 1952 Olympics featured more water polo team entries than any prior Olympics. Russia competed in Olympic water polo for the first time.

The U.S. water polo team was coached by Orho Saari, and featured John Curran of the New York Athletic Club as team manager. Saari, a USA Hall of Fame Member, had coached El Segundo High School and Swim Club, and would later chair the U.S. Water Polo Committee from 1957-1964. Hungary and Yugoslavia were strong favorites to medal and remained highly rated teams for decades. The 1952 Olympic team included goaltender Harry Bisbey, Ace Burns, Bob Hughes, Jaworski, team Captain Jim Norris, Bill Lake, Bob Kohler, Jack Spargo, Bill Kooistra, Bill Dorblaser, and Pete Stange. A new rule allowed movement after the referee called a foul, which sped up the game. Despite low initial expectations, the U.S. team defeated Spain, Belgium, Great Britain, and Austria in preliminary rounds, earning a spot in the semi-finals. Losing their chances at a gold or silver medal, they suffered a disappointing but close 5-4 loss to the Italian team in their first semi-final, and then lost to the Yugoslavian team 4-2 in their last semi-final round, ending their chances for a bronze medal. Hungary and Yugoslavia tied in the final gold medal match, but Hungary was given the gold medal as a result of goal differential, having scored more total goals in competition. Yugoslavia took the silver, and Italy took the bronze medal.

In non-Olympic international competition, Jaworski was part of the U.S. National team at the 1959 Pan American games in Chicago, Illinois.

== Water polo; Coaching, administration ==
Jaworski coached water polo at the New York Athletic Club from 1963-1974, and coached the Senior National Team to the indoor Water polo championship in 1970, 1973, and 1974. In service to the Water Polo Community, he worked as a member of the National Water Polo Committee of the American Athletic Union, and as a member of the US Olympic Water Polo Committee.

=== Construction career ===
In professional pursuits, Jaworski was in charge of new construction at Columbia during the 1960's through the 1970's and was responsible for the new structures in the medical campus and in the Morningside areas. He was remembered as a strong, capable construction professional, and was considered one of the best water polo players of his era.

Eventually working as an Engineering executive, he ascended to the role of President of New York's Catamount Construction Company. Upon his retirement, he moved to New York's Columbia County, and constructed a new residence on a farm. He died at the age of 82 on August 20, 2008 in Elizaville, New York.

=== Honors ===
In 1976, he was inducted into the USA Water Polo Hall of Fame. He received American Athletic Union Outdoor Water Polo All American Team Honors in both 1951 and 1952.
