= Ron Volmer =

American water polo player (born 1935)

Personal information
- Full name: Ronald Lloyd Volmer
- Born: November 22, 1935 (age 90) Downey, California, U.S.
- Height: 183 cm (6 ft 0 in)
- Weight: 79 kg (174 lb)
- Spouse: Judith Alman Hodge
- Children: 3

Sport
- Sport: Water polo, Swimming
- College team: Compton College; UC Berkeley
- Club: Lynwood Athletic Club; City of Commerce; Los Angeles Swim Stadium
- Coached by: Edward Holston (Compton); Neal Kohlhase, Urho Saari (Olympics); James Schultz (City of Commerce)
Medal record
Representing United States
Pan American Games
Silver medal – second place	1963 Sao Paulo	Men's tournament

Ronald Lloyd Volmer (born November 22, 1935) is a former American water polo player who competed for University of California Berkeley and participated in the 1960 Summer Olympics in Rome. He married in 1959 before the Olympics, and having obtained a degree in Optometry from Berkeley, had a career as an optometrist, initially in Manhattan Beach, California.

== Early life ==
Volmer was born in Downey, California to Mr. and Mrs. Loyd F. Volmer on November 22, to 1935. He attended Downey High School, where he competed in swimming, and played water polo from 1950-1953.

Volmer studied first at Compton College where he competed on the swim and water polo teams under Head Coach Edward Holston from around 1953-1955. In 1955, he was on the Compton water polo team that won the Junior College Championship for the State of California. He later transferred and swam and played water polo from 1955-1957 for UC Berkeley, receiving all American Honors in the 100-yard freestyle.

In June 1956, swimming the 100-yard butterfly, Volmer set a Senior Men's Southern Pacific Association AAU record of 57.6 seconds while competing for UC Berkeley.

== 1960 Olympic trials ==
In July, 1960, Hall qualified for the Olympic team, while playing for the Los Angeles Swim Stadium team. In the final Olympic qualifying rounds, Volmer's LA Swim Stadium team lost to the Lynwood Swim Club under Head Coach Neal Kolhase 6-5. Due to his outstanding play, Volmer was selected for the U.S. Olympic team despite his team losing to the Lynwood Club team. Shorly after qualifying for the Olympics, Volmer would begin training with the Lynwood Swim Club under coach Neal Kohlhase in preparation for the 1960 Olympics. Olympic team mate, and LA Swim Stadium team mate Bob Horn would later coach water polo at UCLA and serve as a U.S. Olympic women's water polo coach.

While participating in water polo with clubs between 1958-1961, Volmer served on teams that in the successive years of 1959, 1960, and 1961 placed first in the AAU Sr. National Outdoors Championship.

By 1963, Volmer played for the City of Commerce team under Coach James Schultz, with the team planning to compete at the April, 1963 Pan American games in Sao Paulo, Brazil.

== 1960 Rome Olympics ==
Volmer was a member of the American water polo team which finished seventh in the 1960 Olympic water polo tournament under Coaches Neal Kohlhase and Urho Saari. He played four matches and scored four goals. The team from Italy won the gold, Russia took the silver, and perennial favorite Hungary took the bronze.

In international competition, Volmer received the silver medal as part of the U.S. National team at the 1963 Pan American Games in Sao Paulo, Brazil.

=== Later life ===
In later years, he obtained a medical degree from Berkeley and practiced as an optometrist in Manhattan Beach, California. After completing his degree in Optometry, Volmer was married to Judith Alman Hodge (Volmer) of Tulsa at the St. Laurence Martyr Church in Redondo Beach on September 12, 1959. Judith Volmer majored in education, studying first at the University of Oklahoma, and then at U.C. Berkeley. The couple, who met while at UC Berkeley, had three children Dana, Brian, and Wendy.

=== Honors ===
In 1990, he was inducted into the USA Water Polo Hall of Fame.
