= Harold Dash =

American water polo player (1917–1980)

- Dash at 38, as part of 1948 U.S. Olympic team

Personal information
- Nationality: American
- Born: July 22, 1917 Chicago, Illinois, U.S.
- Died: November 12, 1980 (aged 63) Glenview, Illinois, U.S.
- Occupation(s): Advertising executive Campaign manager

Sport
- Sport: Water polo, Swimming
- Position: Forward (WP)
- College team: Northwestern University
- Club: Illinois Athletic Club
- Coached by: Tom Robinson (Northwestern); Austin Clapp (Olympics)

Harold N. Dash (July 22, 1917 – November 12, 1980) was an American water polo player. He competed in the men's tournament at the 1948 Summer Olympics.

Dash was born July 22, 1917, in Chicago, Illinois. He attended Evanston's St. George High School, and later was a member of the well-known Illinois Athletic Club. While training for the Olympics, Sam Greller was Dash's coach at the Illinois Athletic Club.

Dash attended Northwestern University where he received All American honors in swimming and competed under the guidance of long serving swim coach Tom Robinson. Robinson started the swim program at Northwestern in 1909, and coached there over thirty-five years. Dash served as a Captain of both the water polo and swim teams at Northwestern, and as a highly versatile swimmer, competed at some point in every event but the backstroke. In water polo, he won All-conference honors as a Forward. During WWII, Dash served as a Naval Officer, reaching the rank of Lieutenant Commander.

== 1948 London Olympics ==
Dash participated in water polo Olympic men's tournament at the 1948 Summer Olympics in London that tied for ninth place overall. The team from Italy won the gold medal, Hungary won the silver, and the team representing the Netherlands, won the bronze. The U.S. water polo team, composed primarily of Los Angeles Athletic Club members, was coached by 1932 Water Polo bronze medalist Austin Clapp who took a break from his law practice to coach the U.S. team. The U.S. team won their first preliminary game 7-0 against Uruguay with a score of 7-0, and tied the strong team from Belgium 4-4, but lost their game against the team from Sweden by a score of 7-0 eliminating them from competing in more matches, and ending their chances of making the semi-finals.

In National water polo competition, in 1951 and 1955, Dash was part of Senior Outdoor National Championship Teams, and in 1941, 1948, 1951, 1955 and 1956 was part of Senior Indoor National Championship teams. Staying highly visible in the Olympic community, Dash would later serve as a President of the Midwest United States Olympians.

=== Careers ===
With a long career in advertising, Dash worked as an account executive and founder of Dash Associates on Michigan Avenue in Chicago. In politics, he had served as campaign manager for Michael Howlett, an Illinois Secretary of State and Auditor of Accounts in the 1960's and 70's.

He died somewhat young at 63 in Glenview Hospital of a heart attack in greater Chicago on November 12, 1980, and was survived by a daughter, a brother, and his mother Ida. A memorial service was held on November 14, at Skokie's Piser Chapel and he was buried at Chicago's Montrose Cemetery.

=== Honors ===
In 1976, he was inducted into the USA Water Polo Hall of Fame.
