= Barry Weitzenberg =

American water polo player (born 1946)

Personal information
- Born: Charles Barry Weitzenberg; September 30, 1946 (age 79) Palo Alto, California, U.S.
- Education: University of California Berkeley '69; University of Santa Clara (MBA) '73
- Occupations: Industrial Engineer, Executive; Executive, Optical Manufacturing
- Height: 186 cm (6 ft 1 in)
- Weight: 88 kg (194 lb)
- Spouse: Michele Smith (m. 1969)
- Children: 2

Sport
- Sport: Water Polo
- College team: University of California Berkeley
- Club: De Anaza Athletic Foundation; Foothills Athletic Club
- Coached by: Art Lambert (Awalt High, Olympics); Peter J. Cutino (Berkeley); Monte Nitzkowski ('72 Olympics)
Medal record
Men's water polo
Representing the United States
Olympic Games
Bronze medal – third place	1972 Munich	Team competition

Charles Barry Weitzenberg (born September 30, 1946, in Palo Alto, California) is a former water polo player from the United States, who competed for the University of California at Berkeley, and was a member of the U.S. Olympic men's Water Polo team that won the bronze medal at the 1972 Summer Olympics in Munich, West Germany. After graduating as an Industrial Engineer from Berkeley in 1969, and receiving an MBA from Santa Clara University, Weitzenberg worked with California technology companies, eventually serving as President of SOLA optical in 2000.

== Early life ==
Barry Weitzenberg and his twin brother William Barton were born on the morning of September 30, 1946, at California's Palo Alto Hospital, to Mr. Joseph P. Weitzenberg and Martha Perkins Weitzenberg. At the time of his birth, Barry's father, who attended San Jose State, worked as an inspector at Hendy Ironworks in Sunnyvale, California. Barry grew up in the family home in Los Altos, and first attended Blach Junior High School, then Awalt High School in greater Mountainview, California, beginning around 1960 and graduating in 1964. From an athletic family, Weitzenberg's twin brother William "Bart" Barton was a standout on Awalt High's football team.

Like his brother Bart, Barry enjoyed football, but was informed correctly by early Los Altos High School Coach Art Norton that the Water Polo team could have a greater long-term chance of success and regional recognition, improving his chances for a scholarship, and providing him more specialized training. At Awalt High, Barry was trained and coached by Art Lambert, an accomplished coach in both swimming and water polo, who trained and managed the team from 1961–66, and would serve as an Assistant Olympic coach. In addition to playing water polo, Weitzenberg competed for Awalt swimming where he was part of a record-setting freestyle relay team. By his Senior year around 1964, Weitzenberg had been named to the High School Prep All-American team for two years, and was a critical player in leading the Awalt Water Polo team to the Santa Clara Valley Athletic League and Northern California Championships. Weitzenberg was on the All-SCVAL and All-North Coast Tournament teams, was a member of the California Scholastic Federation, and served as his High School's Junior Class President. His best swim times for short distance events in High School were 23 seconds in the 50-yard event and 49.7 seconds in the 100-yard event.

== University of California Berkeley ==
Weitzenberg attended the University of California Berkeley on a swimming and water polo scholarship from around 1965-1969, where he played water polo under Cal Head Coach, and USA Water Polo Hall of Fame Coach Pete Cutino, who led Cal teams to eight national championships during his twenty-five year coaching tenure. At Cal, Weitzenberg received NCAA All-American honors in 1966, and earned varsity letters in successive years from 1965-1967. He graduated Berkeley in 1969 with a degree in Industrial Engineering, and was a member of Sigma Alpha Epsilon fraternity.

In club play, Weitzenberg played water polo for the DeAnza Athletic Foundation team, and the Foothills athletic club teams between 1965-1972.

Weitzenberg participated in 60 international matches during his water polo career. He was part of the U.S. team that won Pan American gold medals in Winnipeg, Canada in 1967, and another gold in Cali, Colombia in 1971. In U.S. domestic competition, Weitzenberg played on teams that won the 1965, 1966, 1969 and 1970 American Athletic Union Sr. National Outdoor Championships.

== 1968–72 Olympics ==
In 1968, Weitzenberg qualified for the U.S. Olympic Water Polo team, and trained first for two weeks at the DeAnza College Pool, before the team was cut to 16 players and moved to Colorado Springs for training at high altitude. He then traveled with the U.S. Olympic Water Polo team to the 1968 Mexico City Olympics, where the team placed fifth, with Weitzenberg as one of the top overall scorers. Pre-game favorites Yugoslavia took the gold, the Soviet Union took the silver, and Hungary took the bronze medal. Weitzenberg's former Awalt High School Coach, Adam Lambert, was the U.S. Water Polo Team's head coach for pre-Olympic training and at the Olympics in Mexico City. Facing stiff competition in early rounds, the U.S. beat the team from Brazil by a score of 10-5, later reaching a 6-6 tie with Cuba, though they outshot the Cuban team 19-0. In later rounds, the American team lost to pre-game favorites Hungary and the Soviet Union, but beat the East German team by a score of 6-4 in their final rounds to receive their fifth place finish.

Shortly after graduating U. Cal Berkeley, on June 21, 1969, Barry married Michele Smith at the Presbyterian Church in Concord, California. The couple met while students at Berkeley, and Michele worked as a computer programmer at the time of their marriage. At this early stage of his career, Weitzenberg worked as an industrial engineer at FMC Corporation, likely in San Jose. Ushers at the wedding included fellow Olympians Peter Asch, and Gary Scheerer. The couple honeymooned in Hawaii, and planned to live in San Jose.

== 72 Bronze Olympic medal ==
As a participant at the 1972 Munich Olympic Water polo competition, Weitzenberg was one of America's most experienced team members. The U.S. team was managed by Hall of Fame Head Coach Monte Nitzkowski, a former competitor for Long Beach City College, and assisted by Art Lambert, who had coached Weitzenberg at Awalt High School and would serve as his coach with the water polo team at both the DeAnza Athletic Club and Foothills Athletic Club. The 1972 U.S. men's Olympic water polo team included James Ferguson, Peter Asch, Russel Webb, John Parker, Bruce Bradley, Steven Barnett, James Slatton, Gary Sheerer, and Stanley Cole.

Like Weitzenberg, two other U.S. Water Polo players, Jim Ferguson and Gary Sheerer, had formerly attended Awalt High School. Peter Asch, who also attended the University of California Berkeley, was a 1972 Olympic team mate, and James Slatton and Steve Barnett of Long Beach State played goalkeeper. The U.S. water polo team completed the early Olympic rounds unbeaten with a record of 5-0, which included a win over the defending Olympic championship team Hungary. In later rounds, the American team finished with tie games against pre-game favorites West Germany and the Soviet Union, which ended their chances for winning the gold medal. However, they qualified to compete against the team from Italy in the bronze medal match, later beating the Italian team by a score of 6-5 to capture the bronze with Weitzenberg scoring a goal, and team mate Gary Sheerer, with whom he had attended Awalt High, scoring two goals. The pre-game favorite, the team from the Soviet Union took the gold, with Hungary taking the silver medal. America captured one of several third-place bronze in water polo, but their first medal since 1932.

=== Professional career ===
With a career in technology and engineering of over 30 years, in the late 1990's Weitzenberg lived in Santa Rosa, worked in the business of optical manufacturing, and served on the board of the Sonoma County Community Foundation. In his earlier career, in 1982 he worked as a corporate level Vice-President of Manufacturing at Santa Rosa's National Control Inc., a manufacturer of electronic control systems, and supervised the Operations of W.C. Dillon, Inc. He had begun work at National Control by 1980. In 1997, he worked as an Executive Vice-President of Operations for SOLA, a major manufacturer of eyeglass lenses in Petaluma, California, during a time of growth. In 2000, Weitzenberg served as the President of SOLA optical in Petaluma, California, producing such products as very hard thin plastic lenses, where he oversaw a period of lay-offs. Prior to serving as President of SOLA Optical, he served as President of the Optics Division of JDS Uniphase, a manufacturer of thin customized film optics.

=== Honors ===
In 1984, Weitzenberg was inducted into the USA Water Polo Hall of Fame and the California Athletic Hall of Fame in 1987.

== See also ==
- List of Olympic medalists in water polo (men)
