= Sophus Jensen =

American water polo player (1889–1945)

Personal information
- Full name: Sophus Christian Jensen
- Born: July 27, 1889 Chicago, Illinois, United States
- Died: July 25, 1945 (aged 55) Chicago, Illinois, United States
- Height: 180 cm (5 ft 11 in)

Sport
- Sport: Water polo
- Club: Illinois Athletic Club (IAC)
- Coached by: Bill Bachrach IAC; Otto Wahle (Olympics)

Sophus Christian Jensen (July 27, 1889 – July 25, 1945) was an American water polo player. He competed in the men's tournament at the 1920 Summer Olympics.

By 1907, Jensen played water polo and swam representing the Illinois Athletic Club where he was coached by Bill Bachrach, and was known to play right forward in a few early water polo matches. From 1914 to 1917, the Illinois Athletic Club's water polo team won the American national championships in four straight years under Bill Bachrach's coaching. Jensen also swam distance events, finishing fifth in the ten-mile Mississippi River Marathon in St. Louis, Missouri, held on September 2, 1907, and occasionally competed in breaststroke.

== 1920 Antwerp Olympics ==
Jensen was part of the American water polo team in the 1920 Antwerp Olympics which finished fourth in the Olympic Men's water polo tournament. Jensen's role was recorded as a goalkeeper in the 1920 Olympics. The US water polo team was coached by Austrian-born American swimmer Otto Wahle, a 1900 and 1904 Olympic medalist and Water Polo Hall of Fame inductee. Great Britain and the hometown team from Belgium were early favorites to medal in the tournament. The American team defeated Greece in the first Water Polo Match of the Quarterfinals 7–0, on August 24, but lost to Great Britain in the Semi-finals 7–2, eliminating them from the final round. The U.S. team later defeated Belgium 7–2 in a consolation round to determine the 2nd- to 5th-place finishers. Great Britain took the gold medal, Belgium took the silver, and Sweden took the bronze.

=== Careers ===
In 1940, Jensen worked for the Works Project Administration. He worked directing athletics at a club operated by the city of Chicago in 1917.

He died July 25, 1945, in Chicago, Illinois.

== See also ==
- List of men's Olympic water polo tournament goalkeepers
