= Troy Barnhart Jr. =

American water polo player (born 1971)

Personal information
- Born: May 22, 1971 (age 55) Hanford, California, United States
- Occupations: Elementary School Teacher; Water Polo Coach and Referee
- Height: 193 cm (6 ft 4 in)
- Weight: 98 kg (216 lb)
- Spouse: Carmen Tavares (1994)

Sport
- Sport: Water polo
- College team: University of California Berkeley
- Club: Olympic Club (San Francisco); 1998-2000
- Coached by: Coleman Montgomery (Hanford High); Steve Heaston (UC Berkeley); Richard Corso (96 Olympics)

Troy G. Barnhart Jr. (born May 22, 1971) is an American water polo player who competed for the University of California Berkeley. He participated in the men's tournament at the 1996 Summer Olympics.

Barnhart was born May 22, 1971, in Hartford, California, and initially played football for the Pop Warner Youth league as his primary sport. After ending his early football career after breaking his ankle, with the advice of his physician he began swimming with the Hanford Piranhas Recreational Swim team around his High School Sophomore year, and first took up water polo during the summer with the Hanford Summer Water Polo team. He attended Hanford High School in Hanford, California, where he played water polo for three years with their varsity team, beginning his Sophomore year. A multi-sport athlete, apart from his achievements in water polo, Barnhart set a Hanford High School record of 47.78 in the 100 freestyle swim. Graduating Hanford in 1989, Barnhart was a serious student, making the Principal's list for Hanford Union High around the end of his Junior year with a grade point average between 3.75 and 4.0 in July, 1988.

== University of California Berkeley ==
Barnhart attended the University of California Berkeley, graduating with a History major around 1994, where he played water polo under Varsity Water Polo Coach Steve Heaston, who coached water polo at Berkeley from 1989 to 1998. In 1993, Barnhart was voted a Player of the Year for Men's Varsity Collegiate Sports by the Collegiate Water Polo Association, in a year in which he scored a total of 70 points for the team. An exceptional program during his tenure, UC Berkeley's water polo team won two NCAA National championships during Barnhart's tenure as a player.

First joining the team in 1993, Barnhart travelled as part of the US National team in 1994, after graduating the University of California around 1994. In 1995, he played professional water polo for a team in Sicily for around a year.

In January, 1994, he appeared in the Sports Illustrated Swimsuit Edition.

== Marriage ==
Troy married Carmen Tavares on July 9, 1994, and his children included sons Troy Joaquin, born in 1995, and Ethan. Troy and Carmen met while they were attending UC Berkeley. In mid-1996, he trained with the Olympic team in Los Angeles and for a week in Alabama before travelling to Atlanta for the Olympics.

In preparation for the July, 1996 Olympics, Barnhart usually trained six hours a day and six days a week, a schedule that at times put pressures on his marriage, and life with a young son.

== 1996 Atlanta Olympics ==
Barnhart participated in the 1996 Summer Olympics in Atlanta, Georgia under Olympic water polo Head Coach Richard Corso for the American team that placed seventh overall in competition. Other former U. Cal Berkeley water polo players on the team included Gavin Arroyo, Chris Humbert, and Chris Oeding. The team from Spain took the gold medal, Croatia took the silver, and Italy took the bronze. Though generally a utility player in High School, meaning he could play a variety of positions, with the U.S. National team, he more frequently played in the 2-meter or center position.

In international competition, Barhnart played with the US National team that won a gold medal at the Pan American games in Argentina in 1995, and earned a fourth-place finish at the 1995 World Cup competition.

By 1998, he competed with the Olympic Club Team, based in San Francisco, along with several other former Olympic water polo players. He continued to compete with the Olympic Club in 1999 with former water polo Olympians Jeremy Laster, Kirk Everist, and Craig Klass.

== Careers ==
Shortly prior to the Olympics in 1996, Barnhart coached water polo for the Junior Varsity team at his alma mater Hanford High School under former coach Coleman Montgomery, and did public relations work for USA Water polo. He wrote sports related articles for the LeMoore Advance newspapers that year. In the summer of 2000, Barnhart assisted in coaching the water polo team for the Olympic Club30's team, based in San Francisco.

=== Schoolteacher ===
In 2001, Barnhart taught fifth grade, and in 2008, he continued as a sixth grade teacher at Akers Elementary, at the Lemoore Naval Air Station where he did some coaching as well. He also served as a water polo referee during his time teaching elementary school.

In 2004, Barnhart was elected to a school board position with the Kings-River Hardwick Elementary School District. His son Troy Joaquin Barnhart lettered in water polo and swimming for four years at Lemoore High School, and was accepted to play varsity water polo for Stanford University.
