= William Vosburgh =

American water polo player (1890–1953)

- Vosburgh in IAC Jersey, circa 1920

Personal information
- Full name: William Robert Vosburgh Jr.
- Born: December 16, 1890 Oak Park, Illinois, United States
- Died: August 25, 1953 (aged 62) Hines, Illinois, United States
- Height: 172 cm (5 ft 8 in)

Sport
- Sport: Water polo
- College team: University of Illinois
- Club: Illinois Athletic Club (IAC)
- Coached by: Edward Manley (U. of Illinois); William Bachrach (IAC); Otto Wahle ('20 Olympics)

William Robert Vosburgh Jr. (December 16, 1890 – August 25, 1953) was an American swimmer, and water polo player who competed for the University of Illinois. He participated in the men's water polo tournament at the 1920 Summer Olympics in Antwerp, Belgium.

== Early life ==
William Vosburgh Jr. was born December 6, 1890 in Oak Park Illinois, to William Richard Vosburgh and Annie Louise Jones. He attended Oak Park and River Forest High School. Vosburgh played on American Athletic Union Senior National Championship water polo teams in the seven years that spanned 1914-1918, and in 1921, and 1923.

== University of Illinois ==
He attended the University of Illinois in Urbana, Illinois where he was coached in water polo and swimming by Edward Manley, who had a long career coaching at the University of Illinois from 1912-1952. During Manley's inaugural year as coach in 1912, Vosburgh helped lead the Illinois swim team to win the Big 10 Championship.

For most of his competitive career, Vosburgh trained and competed with the Illinois Athletic Club under Head swimming and water polo coach William Bachrach. He was on IAC team that were 4x100 freestyle relay National Champions in the three years from 1914-1916.

== 1920 Olympics ==
A former member of the Illinois Athletic Club's national championship team, Vosburgh was part of the American water polo team in the 1920 Antwerp Olympics which finished fourth in the Olympic tournament. The US water polo team was coached by Austrian-born American swimmer Otto Wahle, a 1900 and 1904 Olympian and Water Polo Hall of Fame inductee. Great Britain, and the hometown team from Belgium were early favorites to medal in the tournament. The American team defeated Greece in the first Water Polo Match of the Quarterfinals 7-0, on August 24, but lost to Great Britain in the Semi-finals 7-2, eliminating them from the final round. The U.S. team later defeated Belgium 7-2 in a consolation round to determine the 2nd to 5th place finishers. Great Britain took the gold medal, Belgium took the silver, and Sweden took the bronze.

=== Honors ===
In 1981, he was inducted into the USA Water Polo Hall of Fame.

Vosburgh died at the age of 62 on August 25, 1953 in Hines, Illinois and was buried at Forest Hill Cemetery.
