= Cavill family =

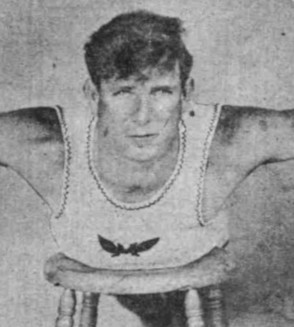
Arthur "Tums" Cavill, c. 1909

The Cavill family of Australia is known for its significant contributions to the development of the sport of swimming.

Prominent family members in the sport include Frederick Cavill (1839–1927), sons Ernest Cavill (1868–1935), Charles Claude Cavill (1870–1897), Percy Frederick Cavill (1875–1940), Arthur Rowland Channel (Tums) Cavill (1877–1914), and Sydney St. Leonards Cavill ("Sid") (1881–1945).

Six members of the family were jointly inducted into the International Swimming Hall of Fame in 1970.

== Frederick Cavill ==
Frederick Cavill (1839–1927) was a sailor, and was awarded three lifesaving medals by the Royal Humane Society. He was also an apprentice on the HMY Fairy and was England's fastest man at swimming 500 yards. As he got older, he became a swimming coach and the Kensington Swimming Baths owner, where he coached Princess Mary to swim. He later moved to Australia and became one of the first people to swim and develop the front crawl.

=== Channel crossing attempts ===
==== First attempt ====
In August 1876, around a year after Matthew Webb completed the first successful crossing of the English Channel, Cavill attempted his own crossing. Webb accompanied Cavill for the swim, and Cavill used many of Webb's techniques, such as using porpoise oil and the captain George Toms. Cavill started fast, but soon ran into multiple jellyfish which caused him to feel nauseous. After consuming a large amount of Whiskey, Cavill was eventually pulled out after 10 hours of swimming. He was disorientated and had a weak pulse.

Webb criticised Cavill for using the faster side stroke rather than the older breaststroke, and for wearing a jersey. Webb also said that Cavill had only made it halfway across, which made Cavill angry and determined to give it another attempt.

==== Second attempt ====
In July 1877, Cavill attempted it a second time, this time starting in Cap Gris Nez, France and attempting to swim to Dover, England. Cavill claimed to have completed the crossing ten hours faster than Webb, but was discredited when his signed witness Mr. Gammon was discovered to have never existed. Cavill never admitted to lying, but challenged Webb to a race across the channel, which he declined.

His wife, Theophile Mary Cavill died 6 April 1902.

== The Cavill sisters ==
Madeline, Fredda and Alice Cavill, Frederick's three daughters, were also skilled swimmers and swimming instructors who gave lifesaving exhibitions from childhood.

Alice Cavill went on to a professional swimming career. Her position as a professional in a sport then dominated by amateur ideals, and the choices this required of her, are the subject of a study by sports historian Gary Osmond.

Fredda Cavill married into the Eve family and later managed the Municipal Baths at Parramatta; she was a guest of honour at the 1959 opening of the Parramatta War Memorial Swimming Centre. Three of her sons continued the family's sporting tradition. Fredda Cavill's son Dick Eve won gold at the 1924 Summer Olympics in the plain high diving, becoming the first Australian Olympic diver to win gold. Jim Eve was appointed MBE for his role as organising secretary of the 1938 British Empire Games in Sydney.

Madeline Cavill became Mrs. Madeline Hendy Pooley. In 1909 she received a silver medal and certificate of merit from the New South Wales Royal Shipwreck Relief Society for saving a child from drowning.

== Ernest Cavill ==
Ernest Cavill (1868–1935), the eldest of Frederick Cavill's sons, won the New South Wales 1,000-yard freestyle championship at the age of 15 and, in 1888, set a world record for the distance of 14 minutes 41 seconds. He later travelled to England, where he defeated the American champion McCusker in a series of races promoted as a world title contest. Cavill worked as a swimming teacher for much of his career and died in Balmain, New South Wales in 1935.

== Charles Cavill ==
On 20 September 1896, an estimated crowd of 60,000 watched Charles Claude Cavill (1870–1897) become the first swimmer across San Francisco's Golden Gate strait.He died less than a year later, in May 1897, in a swimming-related accident at the Stockton Baths in California. Accounts of the exact cause differ. The International Swimming Hall of Fame attributes his death to gas fumes inhaled during an underwater endurance exhibition, while other retellings describe it simply as a drowning.

== Percy Cavill ==
Percy Frederick Cavill (1875–1940) held four Australian national titles before travelling to England, where his wins in the 440-yard and five-mile events at the 1897 Amateur Swimming Association (ASA) championships made him, by some accounts, the first Australian swimmer to take a title overseas. He subsequently taught swimming in the United States for about fifteen years. The International Swimming Hall of Fame states that he later lived on Andros Island in the Bahamas, where he died in November 1940.

== Arthur Cavill ==
Arthur "Tums" Cavill (1877–1914) also crossed the Golden Gate, following his brother Charles, and spent much of his career in the United States as a professional exhibition swimmer. His stunts included swimming with his limbs tied together. At one 1912 exhibition in Pittsburgh, he was lowered into the water from a bridge while sewn inside a bag. He also toured Oregon promoting swimming instruction. Cavill froze to death in February 1914 while attempting to swim across Puget Sound, near Seattle. Arthur Cavill is credited by sports journalist W.F. Corbett with originating the Australian crawl stroke, which now predominates in "freestyle" swimming races.

== Sid Cavill ==
Unlike his older brothers, Sydney St. Leonards Cavill ("Sid") (1881–1945) was born in Australia. A national champion by 16, he went into coaching and spent much of his career teaching at the San Francisco Olympic Club, where swimmers under him included J. Scott Leary. He is credited by some sources as an originator of the butterfly arm stroke. He died in 1945.

== Dick Cavill ==
Youngest son Richmond (Dick) Theophilus Cavill (1884–1938) was the first to use the Australian crawl stroke in a competition, winning 100 yards State championship in 1899. In England, in 1902, he was the first to swim 100 yards in under a minute. By the time he settled back in Australia in 1913, he had spent several years living and swimming in New Zealand and the United States, where, among other things, he took on the role of "Father Neptune" in a Wirths' circus act. His last years were spent running a leased pool at Balmoral in Sydney. A heart attack ended his life on 2 May 1938, at the age of 54.

== See also ==
- List of members of the International Swimming Hall of Fame

== Sources ==
- Watson, Kathy (2001). The crossing: the glorious tragedy of the first man to swim the English channel. 375 Hudson Street, New York: G. P. Putnam's Sons. ISBN 1-58542-109-X.
