= Richard Greenberg (water polo) =

American water polo player (1902–1978)

Richard Jay Greenberg -Greene
- Greenberg from group shot, circa 1928

Personal information
- Born: June 13, 1902 Chicago, Illinois, United States
- Died: September 22, 1978 (aged 76) Boise, Idaho, United States
- Spouse: Joan Larabee

Sport
- Sport: Water polo, Swimming
- Club: Chicago Athletic Association; Crystal Swim Club (Seattle)
- Coached by: Ray Daughters (Crystal Swim); William Bachrach, (Olympics)

Richard Jay Greenberg, later known as Richard Jay Greene (June 13, 1902 – September 22, 1978) was an American water polo player who competed and trained with the Chicago Athletic Association. He participated in the men's tournament at the 1928 Summer Olympics in Amsterdam where the U.S. team tied for fifth place overall. He later worked as an investment manager.

Greenberg was born June 13, 1902, into a large family in greater Chicago, and competed for the Chicago Athletic Association. He later changed his name to Greene.

In swimming, Greenberg won an indoor title as part of American Athletic Union competition in the 4x100 yard freestyle relay in 1927. He was part of a relay team in Edmonton, Alberta in April, 1924, which unofficially broke the Canadian record for the 4x200 foot freestyle relay with a time of 2:24.4.

Greenberg lived in the Seattle area in April, 1924, and trained a few times with Hall of Fame Coach Ray Daughters of the Crystal Swimming Club. According to Daughters, Greenberg had not competed regularly between 1921 and 1924.

== 1928 Amsterdam Olympics ==
He participated in the 1928 Amsterdam Olympics in water polo under the management of U.S. Olympic Coach William Bachrach, a Hall of Fam member. Subsequent to a first round bye, the American team had to play against Hungary, the world's top ranked team, and a dominant team in subsequent years as well. In Greenberg's only game starting for the U.S. team, the Americans were shut out by Hungary in a 5–0 loss. Sam Greller, who would later coach the Illinois Athletic Club was one of Greenberg's Olympic teammates in 1928, as was future film star Johnny Weissmuller. The German team took the gold medal, the Hungarians captured the silver. In a semi-final bout, the U.S. team lost to France 2-1 who took the bronze medal. The U.S. team finished in seventh place or technically part of a three-way tie for fifth place overall.

Greenberg married Joan Larabee on September 20, 1940.

=== Later life ===
He was a partner in Chicago's Universal Sheet and Strip Steel corporation, and worked as an investment manager. During his lifetime, he held an American and World swimming record.

As Richard Greene, he moved to Los Angeles in 1956, later to Idaho's Williams Lake and to Boise, Idaho in the mid-1970s. A sportsman, and angling enthusiast in his retirement, Williams Lake was known as an ideal environment for fly fishing.

He died at age 76 as Richard Greene at a Hospital in Boise, Idaho on September 22, 1978, and was survived by his wife Joan Larabee, a daughter, four sons and grandchildren. Services were held at Holy Cross Cemetery in Los Angeles.
