= Lee Case =

American water polo player (1917–1984)

- Case, taken from 1948 Olympic Water Polo team group photo

Personal information
- Full name: Lemoine Spencer "Lee" Case
- Born: August 8, 1917 Curtis, Nebraska, US
- Died: December 31, 1984 (aged 67) Rancho Mirage, California, US
- Occupations: Police officer (33 years); Mayor, Cathedral City, CA
- Spouse: Geraldine Core (1950)

Sport
- Sport: Water polo
- College team: University of Southern California
- Club: Los Angeles Athletic Club
- Coached by: Austin Clapp (LAAC, Olympics)

Lemoine Spencer "Lee" Case (August 8, 1917 – December 31, 1984) was an American water polo player. He competed in the men's tournament at the 1948 Summer Olympics. With a public service career of over 30 years, Case served as a greater Los Angeles area Police Officer, a Seal Beach Police Chief, and as a Mayor of California's Cathedral City. In 1976, he was inducted into the USA Water Polo Hall of Fame.

== Early life ==
Case was born August 8, 1917 in Curtis, Nebraska, and grew up in California where he attended Inglewood High School, competing in Water Polo from 1932-1935. In 1934 and 1935, at Inglewood High, he was voted All-League for Southern California High Schools.

He graduated from the University of Southern California, later working towards a graduate degree in Public Administration. While at USC, where he competed in Water Polo from 1935-1939, he earned ALL Pacific-8 Conference honors in three successive years from 1937-1939.

From 1942-46, Case, after completing his undergraduate studies at USC, Case was part of the U.S. Navy during the WWII era, serving as a line officer on a Destroyer. From 1943-1946, he served at the Naval Air Station at Los Alamitos.

Case had a long career playing water polo as a club sport from 1940-1948, primarily for the Los Angeles Athletic Club.

== 1948 London Olympics ==
Case participated in men's water polo tournament at the 1948 London Olympics that consisted largely of players from the Los Angeles Athletic Club, and was coached by former Olympic swimmer and water polo player Austin Clapp. The team stayed at the Royal Air Force Base in Uxbridge, near London. Spending on the Olympics was somewhat frugal in London, as they were still recovering from the war. According to Case, the team was hurt by having their regular goalkeeper Bruce Kidder, who had qualified for the games, barred from competition because he had worked as a Coach during High School, and could not be considered an amateur. Case believed Kidder had not served as a paid coach, and that the refereeing during the Olympics was biased against the U.S. team.

Case played Guard on the Olympic team which reached the semi-finals. Italy won the gold medal, Hungary the silver, and the team from the Netherlands won the bronze, in a period when European teams particularly Eastern European teams usually dominated water polo. The U.S. team was coached by former Olympian Austin Clapp. Though the U.S. won their first game against the team from Uruguay 7-0, and then had a tie game with the strong team from Belgium that ended in a score of 4-4, they lost their critical match with Sweden in a 7-0 semi-final shutout, and were eliminated from further rounds. The U.S. team ended competition with a ninth place ranking.

Case was married to Delores West in the 1940's. In November, 1958, he married Geraldine Core. In July, 1984, Case's 39-year old daughter Carol, a Leukemia victim, carried the Olympic torch in its final miles to the Los Angeles Coliseum where the Olympics were being held.

== Police career and service as Mayor ==
Case served nine years as Police Chief for the small town of Seal Beach, and for twenty-four years with the Los Angeles Police Department where he was a watch commander. He worked for increasing recreational activities, including those for Senior Citizen, and for increasing the size of the Fire and Paramedics services. In later life, Case he as the Mayor of California's Cathedral City near Redondo Beach.

He died on December 31, 1984, in Rancho Mirage, California. He had served as a President of the Chiefs of Police, Sherrifs, District Attorneys, and FBI Association of Orange County.
