= Ronald Severa =

American water polo player (born 1936)

Personal information
- Full name: Ronald Duane Severa
- Born: August 13, 1936 (age 89) Munden, Kansas, United States
- Occupation: Collegiate water polo coach (USC)
- Height: 180 cm (5 ft 11 in)
- Weight: 70 kg (154 lb)

Sport
- Sport: Water Polo, Swimming
- College team: Compton College; University of Southern California
- Club: Lynwood Swim Club; City of Commerce SC; Downey Athletic Club
- Coached by: Peter Daland (USC); Neal Kohlhase, Urho Saari (Olympics)
Medal record
Representing United States
Pan American Games
| Gold medal – first place | 1959 Chicago | Men's tournament |
| Silver medal – second place | 1963 Sao Paulo | Men's tournament |

Ronald "Ron" Duane Severa (born August 13, 1936) is an American water polo player who competed in the 1956 Summer Olympics in Melbourne and in the 1960 Summer Olympics in Rome. He later served as a water polo coach at his alma mater, the University of Southern California from 1964 to 1991, and owned a construction company.

Severa was born August 13, 1936, in Munden, Kansas, but after a family move, grew up and attended Downey High School in the Los Angeles suburb of Downey.

During his collegiate years, he initially attended Compton College.

== University of Southern California ==
He completed his education at the University of Southern California, where he competed in water polo primarily as a club sport, and earned varsity letters in 1955, and from 1957 to 1958. A multi-sport athlete, he earned All-American honors in swimming in three successive years from 1956 to 1958, partly under the direction of Coach Peter Daland, a Hall of Fame inductee. Severa served as a Captain of the team in 1958. While at USC, in 1962 and 1963, Severa was an All Pacific-9 conference honoree.

== 1956 Melbourne Olympics ==
Severa was a member of the American water polo team which finished fifth in the 1956 Olympic tournament in Melbourne, Australia under Head Olympic Coach Neal Kohlhase and Assistant Coach Urho Saari, both Water Polo Hall of Fame members. Severa played three matches, most frequently playing as a Guard, a position that utilized his height to defend the "hole", the area in around 2 meters from the center of the goal. Hungary took the gold, Yugoslavia took the silver, and the Russian team captured the bronze. A well-publicized feature of the tournament was a very rough match between pre-Olympic favorite Hungary and Russia that had to be stopped by the referees. On December 6, the Hungarian team won their match against Russia by a score of 4-0, and went undefeated in the tournament, but considerable animosity existed between the Russian and Hungarian teams as a result of the recent Russian occupation of Hungary in November, 1956, subsequent to a student revolt in the same month. Referees stopped the game late in the fourth quarter with the score 4–0 to prevent further violence between the teams.

== 1960 Rome Olympics ==
As a member of the Lynwood Water Polo Club, he trained for the 1960 Olympics and was part of the Lynwood Club when they won the Olympic qualifying tournament.

Severa participated in the 1960 Rome Olympics in the 1960 Olympic men's water polo tournament, where one of his Olympic coaches was Urho Saari. Severa played all seven matches and scored four goals. The U.S. team placed seventh among the sixteen countries participating. Pre-games favorite Italy took the gold medal, the team from the Soviet Union took the silver, and Hungary took the bronze.

Severa was the recipient of Outdoor Water Polo All-American honors in successive years from 1960 to 1963.

=== Pan Am Games ===
In non-Olympic international competition, Severa was a member of two USA Pan American teams. He won a gold medal in the 1959 Games in Chicago, IL, and a silver medal in the 1963 Games in São Paulo, Brazil.

== Coaching ==
Severa was a Water Polo Coach at his alma mater, the University of Southern California where he served as a Head Water Polo Coach from 1964 through 1991.

In addition to his career coaching water polo, Severa owned a construction company.

=== Honors ===
In 1977, Severa was inducted into the USA Water Polo Hall of Fame. He was inducted into the USC Hall of Fame in 2007.
