= Dixon Fiske =

American water polo player (1914–1970)

- Fiske, around age 34, cropped from 1948 Olympic water polo team photo

Personal information
- Full name: Dixon Davis Fiske
- Born: September 7, 1914 Esparto, California, US
- Died: June 22, 1970 (aged 55) Los Angeles, California, US
- Occupation(s): Water Polo Referee (1948-56); Business Executive, Technology

Sport
- Sport: Water polo
- Position: Forward (WP); Center Forward
- College team: U. California Los Angeles
- Club: Los Angeles Athletic Club (LAAC)
- Coached by: Wally Detrick (Polytech High); Don Parks (WP, UCLA); C. Swendsen (LAAC, Olympics); Austin Clapp ('48 Olympics)

Dixon Davis Fiske (September 7, 1914 – June 22, 1970) was an American water polo player who competed for the University of California Los Angeles. He participated in water polo at the 1936 Summer Olympics in Berlin and the 1948 Summer Olympics in London, where the U.S. team tied for ninth place in both Olympic years. Fiske later worked as a Water Polo referee from 1948-1956, and served as a General Manager for technology and defense contractor Dynasciences Corporation in greater Los Angeles.

== Early life ==
Fiske was born September 7, 1914 in Esparto, California. He attended and competed for Long Beach Polytechnic High School in greater Los Angeles where he swam for coach Wallace Detrick, graduating around 1934.

== University of California Los Angeles ==
Fiske swam and played water polo for the University of California Los Angeles. As a College Freshman, he held the Southern Section Pacific Coast Intercollegiate backstroke title. During his athletic career at UCLA, he played water polo for Don Parks, where in the 1935 season, the UCLA team went unbeaten in regular season play and took first place in the Pacific Coast Conference. Playing water polo for UCLA in 1936, Fiske was a recipient of All PAC-8 conference honors. In the 1937-8 season, he received the Gimble Award given to outstanding University of California athletes in minor sports. Competing before water polo was a recognized NCAA sport, Fiske was part of the AAU National Championship team subsequent to his collegiate career in 1940, 1941, and 1947, where he likely competed as part of the Los Angeles Athletic Club.

As early as 1935, in club play, Fiske began swimming for the Los Angeles Athletic Club, then coached by Wallace Detrick, his former coach at Long Beach Polytechnic.

== Olympics ==
=== 1936 Berlin ===
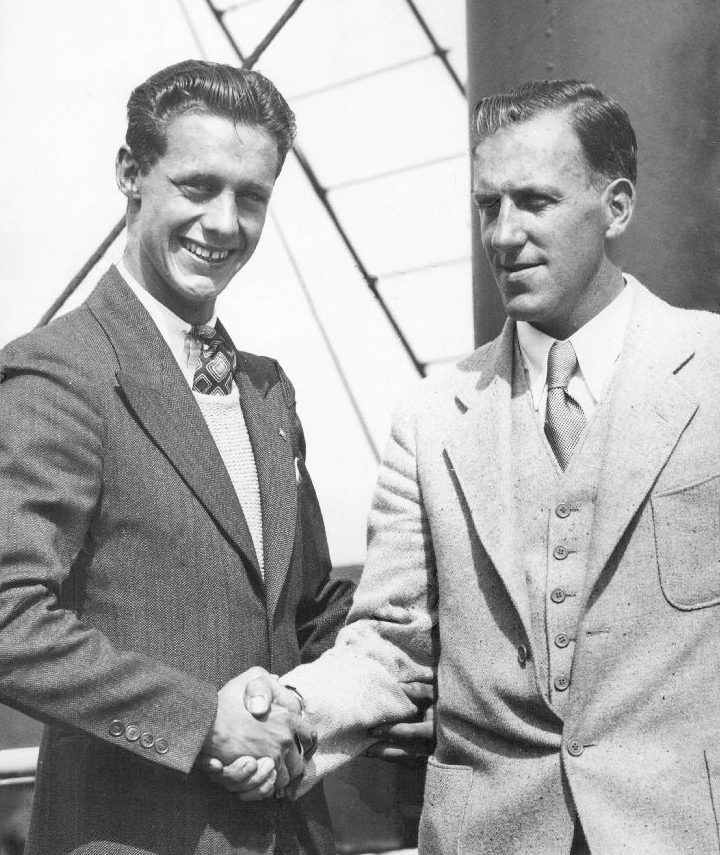
Coach Swendsen, Right

At 22, Fiske participated in water polo at the 1936 Berlin Olympics where the U.S. water polo team tied for ninth place overall and were trained and managed by Head Olympic Coach Clyde A. Swendsen, a 1920 water polo Olympian who coached the Los Angeles Athletic Club for fourteen years. The U.S. team represented the Los Angeles Athletic Club, and won one match and lost two matches in the group preliminaries, not making the semi-finals. Hungary, the pre-games favorite took the gold medal, The host team from Germany, a pre-game favorite took the silver medal, and Belgium took the bronze.

=== 1948 London ===
Twelve years later he was a participant in the 1948 Summer Olympics in London where the U.S. water polo team again tied for ninth place in competition. The U.S. water polo team, composed primarily of Los Angeles Athletic Club members, was coached by 1932 Water Polo bronze medalist Austin Clapp who took a break from his law practice to coach the U.S. team. Italy took the gold, Hungary took the silver, and the Netherlands took the bronze. The U.S. team won their first preliminary game 7-0 against Uruguay with a score of 7-0, and tied the strong team from Belgium 4-4, but lost their game against the team from Sweden by a score of 7-0 eliminating them from competing in more matches, and ending their chances of making the semi-finals.

=== Honors ===
Fiske became a member of the USA Water Polo Hall of Fame in 1976.

=== Careers ===
In his professional career, Fiske ascended to the role of General Manager of Dynasciences Corporation, part of Whittaker Corporation, a scientific-based research and development contractor that served the aerospace and defense industries and biomedical technology by the late 1960's. Remaining active in the water polo community, Fiske worked as a referee intermittently from 1948-1956.

He died at 55 on June 22, 1970 in Los Angeles, California. Funeral services were held mid-day on June 27 at the Canoga Park's Praiswater Funeral Home. His cremated remains were interred at Woodland Cemetery in Woodland, Yolo County, California.
