= James Gaughran =

American swimming coach (born 1932)

- Gaughran c. 1960

Biographical details
- Born: July 5, 1932; San Francisco, California
- Education: Stanford University

Playing career
- 1950–1954: Stanford University; Swimming Team; Water Polo Team
- 1956: U.S. Olympic Water Polo Team; Two matches
- Positions: 100 Freestyle, Indiv. Medley. Water Polo, played Back

Coaching career (HC unless noted)
- 1969–1973: Stanford University; Water Polo
- 1960–1979: Stanford University; Swimming Team

Head coaching record
- Overall: 129-47-1.728 Winning Pct. (Stanford Swimming)

Accomplishments and honors

Championships
- '67 NCAA Championship Title; Stanford Swimming

Awards
- Inter. Swimming Hall of Fame; Stanford Athletic Hall of Fame; USA Water Polo Hall of Fame; 2 x All-American Swimmer (Stanford)

James Alan Gaughran (born July 5, 1932) was an American water polo player, and competitive swimmer for Stanford University, who became a Hall of Fame Head Swimming and Water Polo Coach for Stanford from 1960–79. A former Olympian, Gaughran competed in Water Polo for the U.S. in the 1956 Summer Olympics in Melbourne.

He was born in San Francisco and grew up in Redwood City, where his father James A. Gaughran taught him to swim at China Beach, adjacent to the Golden Gate Bridge.

== Sequoia High ==
Gaughran evolved into an outstanding swimmer and water polo player under coach Clyde Devine at Redwood City's Sequoia Union High School, where he graduated in 1950, and held records for the 50 and 100 yard freestyle. While swimming for Sequoia High, Gaughran was named to the All-America swimming team. Coach Devine let Jim know he believed he could make it to the U.S. Olympic team.

Gaughran's brother Robert "Bob" Kramer Gaughran, was also a Sequoia High School swimming star like James, and a Water Polo player, swimming title holder, and team Captain at College of the Pacific, where he graduated in 1957. Robert, who served as best man at Jim's wedding, would coach swimming and water polo for Menlo-Atherton High School in Menlo Park, CA by 1958, and lead their Water Polo Team to an undefeated season in 1959. Having a brother who he was close to become a successful water polo and swim coach may have influenced Gaughran to consider coaching as a full-time profession.

== Stanford water polo and swim athlete ==
Gaughran swam and played college water polo for Stanford University beginning in the fall of 1950, and served as captain of both teams in his senior year in 1954. By his junior year, he attended the NCAA Championships at Ohio State in March, 1953.

Demonstrating skills in diverse strokes, he specialized in the 150-yard individual medley, though he also competed in freestyle events. A multi-sport athlete, at Stanford he was a Pacific Coast Conference champion in the 100-yard freestyle from 1953–54, and made the All-Pacific Coast Conference Water Polo Team in 1951–1953. He graduated in 1954 with a B.A. in economics, and was president of his fraternity Kappa Sigma. He swam under the leadership of former Stanford swimmer, and Stanford Hall of Fame Coach Tom Haynie.

After Stanford college graduation on June 12, 1954, at 21, he married Joan Ross McCrae at St. Annes Chapel in Palo Alto. Joan had also attended Sequoia Union High School and then College of the Pacific. Jim taught swimming in the summer after college graduation.

=== 1956 U.S. Olympic Water Polo Team ===
He continued to develop his skills in Water Polo, with San Francisco's Olympic Club, and a year after college graduation competed in the Senior National AAU Championship in Chicago with nine other players, including his brother Robert. Two years after graduating Stanford, he became a member of the American water polo team which finished fifth in the 1956 Summer Olympics in Melbourne, Australia. He played two matches.

==== All America Team, Water Polo ====
In November, 1958, he and his brother Bob led the San Francisco Olympic Club to a Pacific Association AAU Championship. Still recognized as a top Water Polo player while playing for San Francisco's Olympic Club, in early December 1959 he was named by the American Athletic Union to the All America Water Polo Team as a Back.

In the fall of 1954, he had begun attending Stanford Law School. In the fall of 1960, having worked in law for a few years, and serving as a deputy attorney general while working at the office of the California attorney general, he was asked by Stanford to replace his former coach Tom Haynie, who was retiring. Gaughran considered remaining in a private law practice with Attorney Austin Clapp in Redwood City. Clapp was also a Stanford Law graduate, and was a member of the 1956 U.S. Olympic Swimming Team. However, Gaughran would soon leave the position to become a full-time Stanford coach.

== Coaching at Stanford ==
Accepting the position, Gaughran became Stanford's head swimming coach from 1960 to 1979, and the head coach of Stanford's water polo team from around 1965 to 1973. As a career highlight, Gaughran lead Stanford to its first NCAA Men's Swimming and Diving Championship in 1967.

During his early years at Stanford, Gaughran served as an assistant water polo coach for the U.S. team at the 1963 Pan American Games in Brazil.

After his coaching career, in 1984 Gaughran was nominated for the Collegiate Scholastic Award for coaches who have made the greatest contribution to the sport of swimming as it relates to undergraduate and scholastic education.

=== Managing National Swim Coaches Clinics ===
Beginning in 1970, and for a number of subsequent years, Gaughran owned and managed National Swim Coaches’ Clinics which featured educational seminars often presented by outstanding American coaches in water polo and swimming.

=== Olympic medalists coached ===
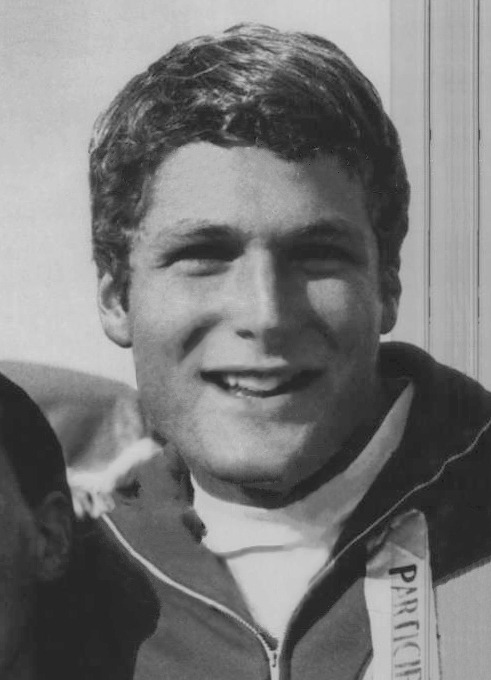
Gold medalist G. Buckingham

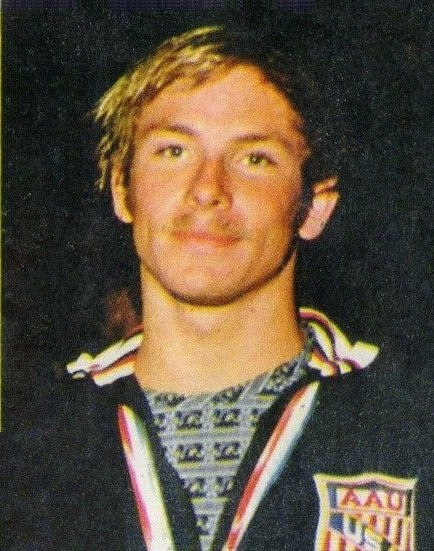
Gold medalist J. Hencken

As the coach of an elite program at Stanford in both swimming and water polo, from 1960 to 1980 he produced 26 swimmers for the Olympics who together set 26 world records, and eleven world records in relays and together took eight gold, two silver and five bronze medals. Olympians he coached who won medals included Paul Hait and George Harrison in 1960, Dick Roth in '64, Brian Job, Mitch Ivey, Mike Wall, Greg Buckingham and John Ferris in '68, John Hencken, Mitch Ivey in swimming, and John Parker and Gary Sheerer in Water Polo in '72, and swimmers Mike Bruner, John Hencken, and Kim Peyton in 1976. Gaughran also coached Paul Hartloff, who was a '76 Montreal competitor as an 18-year old in the 1500-meter freestyle who placed seventh amid fierce competition.

As Stanford's swim coach, he compiled a dual meet record of 129-47-1, giving him a .728 Winning Percentage. During his years as head coach, he produced 15 NCAA champions with four first place relay teams.

Jim worked for a period as an assistant administrative director at Stanford after retiring as a swim coach.

=== Service to the swimming community ===
From 1968 to 1972, he served on the U.S. Olympic Swimming Committee, and from 1964 to 1972 served on the U.S. Olympic Water Polo Committee. He was president of the College Swimming Coaches Association of America in 1962.

Of considerable importance in Jim's career was his managing a swimming team trip which the U.S. State Department sponsored to China in 1973 during the early history of normalizing relations with the Chinese government. Consisting of around nine swimmers and divers and two coaches including the Naval Academy Diving Coach, the excursion allowed athletes and coaches to meet and work on the technique of young Chinese swim athletes and included demonstrations and clinics. It was considered one of the first cultural exchanges sponsored by the State Department with China since 1949, but was not without controversy. The American Athletic Union had concerns about the excursion as they had not given permission for the trip and considered suspending some of the American participants from local AAU branches and competitions at one point after the trip was concluded. Jim's natural skills in diplomatic relations with leaders in both China's athletic and political community was credited by leaders of both nations with helping to improve relations between the two countries.

== Athletic achievements ==
An accomplished athlete after his college swimming career, Jim was a U.S. Water Polo All-American five times, an Outdoor All American swimmer consecutively from 1956–1960, and was twice an Outdoor Swimming champion for the American Athletic Union representing the San Francisco Olympic Club.

=== Triathlon ===
In 1984, Jim worked as a consultant for the Twin Falls Idaho pool and gymnasium project. In June 1984, he was the oldest person to complete the 52 total Mile Idaho Triathlon in Lake Lowell which featured a 1 km swim in 62 degree Lake Lowell. Living in Sun Valley, Idaho, he competed and placed well in his age group in Triathlons through 1988.

In 1985, he was selected to compete in the Bud Light Iron Man Triathlon World Championships in Honolulu.

=== Late life swimming ===
Jim competed in the 1.75 mile Kailua-Popoi'a Swim in May 1993, taking first in his age group over 55, and swam the race again in May 1995, taking first place in the 60-64 age group. Continuing to compete as a swim athlete, in September 1994, he placed second in the 60-64 age group at the challenging 2.4 mile Waikiki Roughwater Swim in Honolulu with a time of 1:33:10. Jim had an age group win for 65-69 in the Waikiki Swim in 2001 and had been an age group winner in another year.

=== Honors ===
He was inducted into the International Swimming Hall of Fame in 2015, and is also a member of the Stanford Athletic Hall of Fame and the USA Water Polo Hall of Fame.

On April 1, 1987, he and ten other living coaches were selected to receive the Baton of Victory Award at the University of Texas at Austin as a winner of the NCAA swimming championships. Three non-living recipients received the award, which was the creation of University of Alabama Swim Coach Ray Bussard and his wife Ruth.

== See also ==
- List of members of the International Swimming Hall of Fame
