= United States men's national water polo team =

United States
- FINA code: USA
- Association: USA Water Polo
- Confederation: UANA (Americas)
- Head coach: Dejan Udovičić
- Asst coach: Gavin Arroyo; Matt Ustaszewski
- Team manager: Paulina Bui
- Team official: Christopher Bates (Sports Medicine Manager)
- Captain: Max Irving
- Most caps: Tony Azevedo
- Top scorer(s): Tony Azevedo

FINA ranking (since 2008)
- Current: 7 (as of August 9, 2021)
- Highest: 2 (2008, 2009)
- Lowest: 11 (2017)

Olympic Games (team statistics)
- Appearances: 24 (first in 1904)
- Best result: (1984, 1988, 2008)
- 5-time Olympian(s): Tony Azevedo (2000–2016)
- Top scorer(s): Tony Azevedo (61 goals, 2000–2016)
- Flag bearer(s): Terry Schroeder (1988)

World Championship
- Appearances: 22 (first in 1973)
- Best result: 4th place (1986, 1991, 2009)
- Most caps (FP): Tony Azevedo (2001/03/05/07/09/11/13/15, 8 times, 50 matches played)
- Most caps (GK): Merrill Moses (2007/09/11/13/15, 5 times, 30 matches played)

World Cup
- Appearances: 18 (first in 1979)
- Best result: (1991, 1997)
- Most caps (FP): Terry Schroeder (1979/81/85/87/91, 5 times)
- Most caps (GK): Craig Wilson (1983/85/87/89/91, 5 times)
- Most titles: Chris Humbert (1991, 1997)

World League
- Appearances: 19 (first in 2002)
- Best result: (2008, 2016, 2020, 2022)
- Most caps (FP): Jesse Smith (2002/03/06/07/08/09/10/11/12/15/16/18/20, 13 times)
- Most caps (GK): Merrill Moses (2002/03/06/07/08/09/10/11/12/15/16, 11 times)

Pan American Games
- Appearances: 19 (first in 1951)
- Best result: (1959, 1967, 1971, 1979, 1983, 1987, 1995, 1999, 2003, 2007, 2011, 2015, 2019, 2023)
- Most caps (FP): Jesse Smith (2003/07/11/15/19, 5 times)
- Most caps (GK): Craig Wilson (1983/87/91, 3 times); Merrill Moses (2007/11/15, 3 times)
- Most medals: Jesse Smith (2003/07/11/15/19, 5 medals)
- Most titles: Jesse Smith (2003/07/11/15/19)

Pan American Championships
- Best result: (2005, 2006, 2013)

Media
- Website: usawaterpolo.org
Medal record
Men's water polo
Olympic Games
Silver medal – second place	1984 Los Angeles	Team
Silver medal – second place	1988 Seoul	Team
Silver medal – second place	2008 Beijing	Team
Bronze medal – third place	1924 Paris	Team
Bronze medal – third place	1932 Los Angeles	Team
Bronze medal – third place	1972 Munich	Team
Bronze medal – third place	2024 Paris	Team
World Cup
Gold medal – first place	1991 Barcelona
Gold medal – first place	1997 Athens
Silver medal – second place	1979 Belgrade & Rijeka
Silver medal – second place	1985 Duisburg
Bronze medal – third place	2023 Los Angeles
World League
Silver medal – second place	2008 Genoa
Silver medal – second place	2016 Huizhou
Silver medal – second place	2020 Tbilisi
Silver medal – second place	2022 Strasbourg
Bronze medal – third place	2003 New York
Pan American Games
Gold medal – first place	1959 Chicago	Team
Gold medal – first place	1967 Winnipeg	Team
Gold medal – first place	1971 Cali	Team
Gold medal – first place	1979 San Juan	Team
Gold medal – first place	1983 Caracas	Team
Gold medal – first place	1987 Indianapolis	Team
Gold medal – first place	1995 Mar del Plata	Team
Gold medal – first place	1999 Winnipeg	Team
Gold medal – first place	2003 Santo Domingo	Team
Gold medal – first place	2007 Rio de Janeiro	Team
Gold medal – first place	2011 Guadalajara	Team
Gold medal – first place	2015 Toronto	Team
Gold medal – first place	2019 Lima	Team
Gold medal – first place	2023 Santiago	Team
Silver medal – second place	1955 Mexico City	Team
Silver medal – second place	1963 São Paulo	Team
Silver medal – second place	1975 Mexico City	Team
Silver medal – second place	1991 Havana	Team
Bronze medal – third place	1951 Buenos Aires	Team
Pan American Championships
Gold medal – first place	2005 Mexico City
Gold medal – first place	2006 Rio de Janeiro
Gold medal – first place	2013 Costa Mesa
Silver medal – second place	2013 Calgary
Silver medal – second place	2019 São Paulo
- Last updated: August 11, 2024

The United States men's national water polo team represents the United States of America internationally in men's water polo.

They are the only squad outside of Europe to medal in the men's Olympic water polo tournament, having done so most recently during the 2024 Summer Olympics, winning bronze against Hungary in a penalty shootout.

On May 7, 2013, USA Water Polo named Serbian Dejan Udovičić the head coach of the United States men's senior national team. Udovičić was the former head coach of the Serbian men's national team.

== Results ==
=== Major tournaments ===
==== Competitive record ====
Updated after the 2025 FINA Water Polo World Cup.

Tournament	Appearances	Finishes				
Tournament	Appearances	Champions	Runners-up	Third place	Fourth place	Total
Olympic Games	24	1	4	5	3	13
World Aquatics Championships	22	0	0	0	3	3
FINA Water Polo World Cup	18	2	2	1	7	12
FINA Water Polo World League	19	0	4	1	6	11
Pan American Games	19	14	4	1	0	19
Total	102	17	14	8	19	58

==== Olympic Games ====
Year	Result	Pld	W	L	D
(United States) 1904	Gold medal Silver medal Bronze medal (Demonstration event)	—N/a			
(Belgium) 1920	4th place	5	2	3	0
(France) 1924	Bronze medal	5	2	3	0
(Netherlands) 1928	7th place	3	1	2	0
(United States) 1932	Bronze medal	4	2	1	1
(Germany) 1936	9th place	3	1	2	0
(United Kingdom) 1948	11th place	3	1	1	1
(Finland) 1952	4th place	9	5	4	0
(Australia) 1956	5th place	6	2	4	0
(Italy) 1960	7th place	7	3	4	0
(Japan) 1964	9th place	3	1	2	0
(Mexico) 1968	5th place	8	5	2	1
(West Germany) 1972	Bronze medal	9	6	1	2
(Soviet Union) 1980	Qualified but withdrew				
(United States) 1984	Silver medal	7	6	0	1
(South Korea) 1988	Silver medal	7	5	2	0
(Spain) 1992	4th place	7	4	3	0
(United States) 1996	7th place	8	5	3	0
(Australia) 2000	6th place	8	3	5	0
(Greece) 2004	7th place	7	4	3	0
(China) 2008	Silver medal	7	5	2	0
(United Kingdom) 2012	8th place	8	3	5	0
(Brazil) 2016	10th place	5	2	3	0
(Japan) 2020	6th place	8	3	5	0
(France) 2024	Bronze medal	8	5	3	0
Total	0 Title	145	76	63	6

==== World Championships ====
Year	Result	Pld	W	L	D
(Socialist Federal Republic of Yugoslavia) 1973	5th place	9	4	4	1
(Colombia) 1975	8th place	9	2	4	3
(West Germany) 1978	5th place	11	8	2	1
(Ecuador) 1982	6th place	9	5	4	0
(Spain) 1986	4th place	8	5	2	1
(Australia) 1991	4th place	8	4	3	1
(Italy) 1994	6th place	9	4	4	1
(Australia) 1998	7th place	10	5	5	0
(Japan) 2001	7th place	10	3	7	0
(Spain) 2003	6th place	6	3	2	1
(Canada) 2005	11th place	6	3	3	0
(Australia) 2007	9th place	6	4	2	0
(Italy) 2009	4th place	6	4	2	0
(China) 2011	6th place	7	3	4	0
(Spain) 2013	9th place	4	2	2	0
(Russia) 2015	7th place	7	4	3	0
(Hungary) 2017	13th place	5	3	2	0
(South Korea) 2019	9th place	6	4	2	0
(Hungary) 2022	6th place	7	4	3	0
(Japan) 2023	7th place	7	4	3	0
(Qatar) 2024	9th place	6	3	3	0
(Singapore) 2025	8th place	6	3	3	0
Total	0 Title	162	84	69	9

==== FINA World Cup ====
Year	Result	Pld	W	L	D
(Socialist Federal Republic of Yugoslavia) 1979	Silver medal	7	5	2	0
(United States) 1981	4th place	7	3	2	2
(United States) 1983	4th place	7	2	2	3
(West Germany) 1985	Silver medal	7	4	1	2
(Greece) 1987	4th place	—N/a			
(West Germany) 1989	8th place	—N/a			
(Spain) 1991	Gold medal	—N/a			
(Greece) 1993	4th place	5	1	3	1
(United States) 1995	4th place	5	2	3	0
(Greece) 1997	Gold medal	5	4	0	1
(Australia) 1999	6th place	5	3	2	0
(Serbia and Montenegro) 2002	7th place	4	1	3	0
(Hungary) 2006	Did not qualified				
(Romania) 2010	4th place	6	2	4	0
(Kazakhstan) 2014	4th place	6	3	3	0
(Germany) 2018	6th place	6	2	4	0
(United States) 2023	Bronze medal	8	5	3	0
(Montenegro) 2025	Division 1	5	2	3	0
(Australia) 2026	Division 1	6	1	5	0
Total	2 Titles	89	40	40	9

==== FINA World League ====
Year	Result	Pld	W	L	D
(Greece) 2002	5th place	12	4	8	0
(United States) 2003	Bronze medal	6	3	3	0
(United States) 2004	6th place	14	5	9	0
(Serbia) 2005	9th place	10	5	5	0
(Greece) 2006	5th place	14	11	3	0
(Germany) 2007	5th place	6	3	3	0
(Italy) 2008	Silver medal	6	4	2	0
(Montenegro) 2009	4th place	6	3	3	0
(Serbia) 2010	5th place	10	8	2	0
(Italy) 2011	4th place	8	4	4	0
(Kazakhstan) 2012	4th place	10	7	3	0
(Russia) 2013	4th place	6	3	3	0
(United Arab Emirates) 2014	5th place	10	7	3	0
(Italy) 2015	4th place	14	5	9	0
(China) 2016	Silver medal	12	10	2	0
(Russia) 2017	4th place	12	6	6	0
(Hungary) 2018	7th place	11	9	2	0
(Georgia (country)) 2020	Silver medal	6	4	2	0
(France) 2022	Silver medal	13	10	3	0
Total	0 Title	186	111	75	0

==== Pan American Games ====
Year	Result	Pld	W	L	D
(Argentina) 1951	Bronze medal	—N/a			
(Mexico) 1955	Silver medal	—N/a			
(United States) 1959	Gold medal	—N/a			
(Brazil) 1963	Silver medal	8	5	2	1
(Canada) 1967	Gold medal	—N/a			
(Colombia) 1971	Gold medal	—N/a			
(Mexico) 1975	Silver medal	—N/a			
(Puerto Rico) 1979	Gold medal	—N/a			
(Venezuela) 1983	Gold medal	—N/a			
(United States) 1987	Gold medal	—N/a			
(Cuba) 1991	Silver medal	5	4	1	0
(Argentina) 1995	Gold medal	—N/a			
(Canada) 1999	Gold medal	5	5	0	0
(Dominican Republic) 2003	Gold medal	9	9	0	0
(Brazil) 2007	Gold medal	5	5	0	0
(Mexico) 2011	Gold medal	5	5	0	0
(Canada) 2015	Gold medal	5	5	0	0
(Peru) 2019	Gold medal	6	6	0	0
(Chile) 2023	Gold medal	6	6	0	0
Total	14 Titles	54	50	3	1

=== Minor tournaments ===
==== Competitive record ====
Updated after 2024 Pan American Championships

Tournament	Appearances	Finishes				
Tournament	Appearances	Champions	Runners-up	Third place	Fourth place	Total
Summer Universiade	20	3	4	2	3	12
Pan American Championships	5	3	2	0	0	5
Total	25	6	6	2	3	17

==== Summer Universiade ====
- 1967 – (silver) Silver medal
- 1973 – (bronze) Bronze medal
- 1977 – ? place
- 1979 – (gold) Gold medal
- 1981 – (silver) Silver medal
- 1983 – (silver) Silver medal
- 1985 – 4th place
- 1987 – 5th place
- 1991 – (gold) Gold medal
- 1993 – (gold) Gold medal
- 1995 – 9th place
- 1997 – 7th place
- 1999 – 4th place
- 2003 – 8th place
- 2009 – 6th place
- 2011 – 4th place
- 2013 – 5th place
- 2015 – (bronze) Bronze medal
- 2017 – 9th place
- 2019 – (silver) Silver medal

==== Pan American Championships ====
Year	Result
(Mexico) 2005	Gold medal
(Brazil) 2006	Gold medal
(Canada) 2009	Cancelled
(Canada) 2011	Did not participated
(Canada) 2013 (A)	Silver medal
(United States) 2013 (B)	Gold medal
(Canada) 2015	Did not participated
(Trinidad and Tobago) 2017	Did not participated
(Bolivia) 2018	Did not participated
(Brazil) 2019	Silver medal
2021	Cancelled
(Brazil) 2023	Did not participated
(Colombia) 2024	Did not participated
Total	3 Titles

== Team ==
=== Current squad ===
Roster for the 2026 FINA World Cup.

Head coach: Dejan Udovičić

- 1 Adrian Weinberg GK
- 2 Jack Larsen U
- 3 Marko Vavic U
- 4 Nicolas Saveljic AK
- 5 Hannes Daube AK
- 6 Peter Castillo FP
- 7 Ben Liechty AK
- 8 Luke Nelson FP
- 9 Jett Taylor FP
- 10 Chase Dodd AK
- 11 Ryder Dodd AK
- 12 Max Irving AK
- 13 Charlie Mills GK
- 14 Ryan Ohl AK
- 15 Dominic Brown C
- 16 Bode Brinkema U

=== Former squads ===
==== Olympic Games ====
- 1904 St. Louis
  New York Athletic Club: David Bratton, Budd Goodwin, Louis Handley, David Hesser, Joe Ruddy, James Steen, George Van Cleaf. Head coach: Gus Sundstrom.
  Chicago Athletic Association: Rex Beach, David Hammond, Charles Healy, Frank Kehoe, Jerome Steever, Edwin Swatek, Bill Tuttle. Head coach: Alex Meffert.
  Missouri Athletic Club: Gwynne Evans, Gus Goessling, John Meyers, Bill Orthwein, Amedee Reyburn, Frank Schreiner, Manfred Toeppen.
- 1920 Antwerp
  Clement Browne, James Carson, Harry Hebner (C), Sophus Jensen, Mike McDermott, Perry McGillivray, Norman Ross, Preston Steiger, Herbert Taylor, Herb Vollmer, William Vosburgh. Head coach: Otto Wahle.
- 1924 Paris
  Art Austin, Elmer Collett (GK), Jam Handy, Oliver Horn, Fred Lauer (GK), George Mitchell, John Norton, Wally O'Connor, George Schroth, Herb Vollmer (C), Johnny Weissmuller. Head coach: Harry Hebner (did not go) (Note: Harry Hebner was appointed head coach for the 1924 games, but he did not go due to business commitment.) / Otto Wahle.
- 1928 Amsterdam
  John Cattus (GK), Harry Daniels (GK), Joseph Farley, Richard Greenberg, Sam Greller, George Mitchell (C), Wally O'Connor, Paul Samson, George Schroth, Herbert Topp, Johnny Weissmuller. Head coach: Perry McGillivray.
- 1932 Los Angeles
  Austin Clapp, Phil Daubenspeck, Charley Finn, Harold McCallister, Wally O'Connor (C), Cal Strong, Herb Wildman (GK). (Note: Only 7 players competed in this tournament. They were all listed in page 607, 629, 630, 631, 632 and 633 of the Official Report of the 1932 Olympic Games (page 623, 646, 647, 648, 649 and 650 of the PDF document). The official report of the International Olympic Committee did not count other reserves or alternates as competitors or medalists.) Head coach: Frank Rivas.
- 1936 Berlin
  Kenneth Beck, Phil Daubenspeck, Charley Finn, Dixon Fiske, Fred Lauer (GK), Harold McCallister, Wally O'Connor (C), Ray Ruddy, Herb Wildman (GK). (Note: Only 9 players competed in this tournament. They were all listed in page 984 of the Official Report of the 1936 Olympic Games (page 345 of the PDF document). The official report of the International Olympic Committee did not count other reserves or alternates as competitors.) Head coach: Clyde Swendsen.
- 1948 London
  Kenneth Beck, Bob Bray, Ralph Budelman (GK), Lee Case, Chris Christensen, Harold Dash, Dixon Fiske, Edwin Knox (C). (Note: Only 8 players competed in this tournament. They were all listed in page 470 and 472 of the Official Report of the 1948 Olympic Games (page 642 and 644 of the PDF document). The official report of the International Olympic Committee did not count other reserves or alternates as competitors.) Head coach: Austin Clapp.
- 1952 Helsinki
  Harry Bisbey (GK), Marvin Burns, Bill Dornblaser, Bob Hughes, Edward Jaworski, Bill Kooistra, Norman Lake, Jim Norris (C), Jack Spargo, Peter Stange. (Note: Only 10 players competed in this tournament. They were all listed in page 599, 600, 603, 604 and 605 of the Official Report of the 1952 Olympic Games (page 602, 603, 606, 607 and 608 of the PDF document). The official report of the International Olympic Committee did not count other reserves or alternates as competitors.) Head coach: Urho Saari.
- 1956 Melbourne
  Bob Frojen, Jim Gaughran, Ken Hahn (GK), Robert Horn (GK), Bob Hughes, Bill Kooistra (C), Sam Kooistra, Bill Ross, Ronald Severa, Wally Wolf. (Note: Only 10 players competed in this tournament. They were all listed in page 623 and 624 of the Official Report of the 1956 Olympic Games (page 625 and 626 of the PDF document). The official report of the International Olympic Committee did not count other reserves or alternates as competitors.) Head coach: Neil Kohlhase.
- 1960 Rome
  Chuck Bittick, Marvin Burns, Ron Crawford, Gordie Hall (GK), Robert Horn (GK), Chick McIlroy, Ronald Severa, Fred Tisue, Ron Volmer, Wally Wolf. (Note: Only 10 players competed in this tournament. They were all listed in page 615, 616, 619, 620 and 623 of the Official Report of the 1960 Olympic Games (page 624, 625, 628, 629 and 632 of the PDF document). The official report of the International Olympic Committee did not count other reserves or alternates as competitors.) Head coach: Neil Kohlhase.
- 1964 Tokyo
  Tony van Dorp (GK), Ron Crawford, Dave Ashleigh, Ned McIlroy, Chick McIlroy, Stan Cole, Bob Saari, Dan Drown, Paul McIlroy, Ralph Whitney, George Stransky (GK). Head coach: Urho Saari.
- 1968 Mexico City
  Tony van Dorp (GK), Dave Ashleigh (C), Russ Webb, Ron Crawford, Stan Cole, Bruce Bradley, Dean Willeford, Barry Weitzenberg, Gary Sheerer, John Parker, Steve Barnett (GK). Head coach: Art Lambert.
- 1972 Munich
  Jim Slatton (GK), Stan Cole, Russ Webb, Barry Weitzenberg, Gary Sheerer (C), Bruce Bradley, Peter Asch, Jim Ferguson, Steve Barnett (GK), John Parker, Eric Lindroth. Head coach: Monte Nitzkowski.
- 1980 Moscow
  Chris Dorst (GK), Gary Figueroa, Steve Hamann (GK), Eric Lindroth, Drew McDonald, Kevin Robertson, Peter Schnugg, Terry Schroeder, John Siman, Jon Svendsen, Joe Vargas. Head coach: Monte Nitzkowski.
- 1984 Los Angeles
  Craig Wilson (GK), Kevin Robertson, Gary Figueroa, Peter Campbell, Doug Burke, Joe Vargas, Jon Svendsen, John Siman, Drew McDonald, Terry Schroeder (C), Jody Campbell, Tim Shaw, Chris Dorst (GK). Head coach: Monte Nitzkowski.
- 1988 Seoul
  Craig Wilson (GK), Kevin Robertson, James Bergeson, Peter Campbell, Doug Kimbell, Craig Klass, Alan Mouchawar, Jeff Campbell, Greg Boyer, Terry Schroeder (C), Jody Campbell, Chris Duplanty (GK), Mike Evans. Head coach: Bill Barnett.
- 1992 Barcelona
  Craig Wilson (GK), John Vargas, Chris Duplanty (GK), Mike Evans, Doug Kimbell, Charlie Harris, Kirk Everist, Jeff Campbell, Chris Humbert, Terry Schroeder (C), Craig Klass, Erich Fischer, Alex Rousseau. Head coach: Bill Barnett.
- 1996 Atlanta
  Chris Duplanty (Captain, GK), Dan Hackett (GK), Jeremy Laster, Kyle Kopp, Chris Oeding, Gavin Arroyo, Alex Rousseau, Rick McNair, Kirk Everist, Chris Humbert, Mike Evans, Troy Barnhart, Jr., Wolf Wigo. Head coach: Richard Corso.
- 2000 Sydney
  Dan Hackett (GK), Chi Kredell, Robert Lynn, Kyle Kopp, Chris Oeding (C), Gavin Arroyo, Brad Schumacher, Tony Azevedo, Wolf Wigo, Chris Humbert, Sean Kern, Sean Nolan (GK), Ryan Bailey. Head coach: John Vargas.
- 2004 Athens
  Brandon Brooks (GK), Wolf Wigo (C), Omar Amr, Jeff Powers, Adam Wright, Chris Segesman, Layne Beaubien, Tony Azevedo, Dan Klatt, Brett Ormsby, Jesse Smith, Genai Kerr (GK), Ryan Bailey. Head coach: Ratko Rudić.
- 2008 Beijing
  Merrill Moses (GK), Peter Varellas, Peter Hudnut, Jeff Powers, Adam Wright, Rick Merlo, Layne Beaubien, Tony Azevedo (C), Ryan Bailey, Tim Hutten, Jesse Smith, J. W. Krumpholz, Brandon Brooks (GK). Head coach: Terry Schroeder.
- 2012 London
  Merrill Moses (GK), Peter Varellas, Peter Hudnut, Jeff Powers, Adam Wright, Shea Buckner, Layne Beaubien, Tony Azevedo (C), Ryan Bailey, Tim Hutten, Jesse Smith, John Mann, Chay Lapin (GK). Head coach: Terry Schroeder.
- 2016 Rio de Janeiro
  Merrill Moses (GK), Thomas Dunstan, Ben Hallock, Alex Obert, Alex Roelse, Luca Cupido, Josh Samuels, Tony Azevedo (C), Alex Bowen, Bret Bonanni, Jesse Smith, John Mann, McQuin Baron (GK). Head coach: Dejan Udovičić.

==== World Aquatics Championships ====
- 2005 Montreal
  Brandon Brooks (GK), Ryan Bailey, J. W. Krumpholz, Jeff Powers, Adam Wright, Peter Hudnut, Rick Merlo, Tony Azevedo (C), Spencer Dornin, Brian Alexander, Jesse Smith, Nathaniel Bennett (GK), Shea Buckner. Head coach: Guy Baker.
- 2007 Melbourne
  Merrill Moses (GK), Peter Varellas, Dreason Barry, Jeff Powers, Adam Wright, Kevin Witt, Ryan Bailey, Tony Azevedo (C), Rick Merlo, Layne Beaubien, Jesse Smith, Brian Alexander, Genai Kerr (GK). Head coach: Ricardo Azevedo.
- 2009 Rome
  Merrill Moses (GK), Peter Varellas, Brian Alexander, Jeff Powers, Adam Wright, Justin Johnson, Layne Beaubien, Tony Azevedo (C), Ryan Bailey, Tim Hutten, Jesse Smith, J. W. Krumpholz, Genai Kerr (GK). Head coach: Terry Schroeder.
- 2011 Shanghai
  Merrill Moses (GK), Peter Varellas, Peter Hudnut, Jeff Powers, Adam Wright, Brian Alexander, Layne Beaubien, Tony Azevedo (C), Ryan Bailey, Tim Hutten, Jesse Smith, Shea Buckner, Andy Stevens (GK). Head coach: Terry Schroeder.
- 2013 Barcelona
  Merrill Moses (GK), Janson Wigo, Alex Obert, Alex Bowen, Matthew de Trane, Chancellor Ramirez, J. W. Krumpholz, Tony Azevedo (C), Shea Buckner, Tim Hutten, Michael Rosenthal, John Mann, Andy Stevens (GK). Head coach: Dejan Udovičić.
- 2015 Kazan
  Merrill Moses (GK), Nikola Vavić, Alex Obert, Jackson Kimbell, Alex Roelse, Luca Cupido, Josh Samuels, Tony Azevedo (C), Alex Bowen, Bret Bonanni, Jesse Smith, John Mann, McQuin Baron (GK). Head coach: Dejan Udovičić.
- 2017 Budapest
  McQuin Baron (GK), Johnny Hooper, Marko Vavic, Alex Obert (C), Ben Hallock, Luca Cupido, Thomas Dunstan, Nic Carniglia, Alex Bowen, Chancellor Ramirez, Alex Roelse, Max Irving, Drew Holland (GK). Head coach: Dejan Udovičić.
- 2019 Gwangju
  Alex Wolf (GK), Johnny Hooper, Marko Vavic, Alex Obert, Ben Hallock, Luca Cupido, Hannes Daube, Matthew Farmer, Alex Bowen, Chancellor Ramirez, Jesse Smith (C), Max Irving, Drew Holland (GK). Head coach: Dejan Udovičić.

==== FINA World Cup ====
- 1991 Barcelona
  Jeff Campbell, Mike Evans, Erich Fischer, Charlie Harris, Chris Humbert, David Imbernino, Doug Kimbell, Craig Klass, Robert Lynn, Kames Makshanoff (GK), Terry Schroeder (C), John Vargas, Craig Wilson (GK). Head coach: Bill Barnett.
- 1997 Athens
  Gavin Arroyo, Ryan Bailey, Chris Duplanty (GK), Dan Hackett (GK), Chris Humbert, Kyle Kopp, Chi Kredel, Jeremy Laster, Drew Netherton, Chris Oeding, Brad Schumacher, Peter Stern, Wolf Wigo. Head coach: John Vargas.
- 2010 Oradea
  Merrill Moses (GK), Peter Varellas, Mike Sharf, Jeff Powers, Adam Wright, Jeff Tyrell, Thomas Hopkins, Tony Azevedo (C), Ryan Bailey, Tim Hutten, Jesse Smith, Tommy Corcoran, Andy Stevens (GK). Head coach: Terry Schroeder.
- 2014 Almaty
  McQuin Baron (GK), Conner Cleary, Nolan McConnell, Alex Obert, Alex Bowen, Bret Bonanni, Josh Samuels, Michael Rosenthal, John Mann, Luca Cupido, Jesse Smith, Ryder Roberts, Merrill Moses (GK). Head coach: Dejan Udovičić.
- 2018 Berlin
  McQuin Baron (GK), Johnny Hooper, Dylan Woodhead, Alex Obert, Ben Hallock, Luca Cupido, Nic Carniglia, Alex Roelse, Alex Bowen, Ben Stevenson, Jesse Smith (C), Max Irving, Jack Turner (GK). Head coach: Dejan Udovičić.

==== Pan American Games ====
- 1975 Mexico City
  Guy Antley (GK), Peter Asch, Paul Becsahazy, Thomas Belfonti, Jim Ferguson, Steve Hamann (GK), Jim Kruse, Eric Lindroth, Mike Loughlin, Peter Schnugg, Jon Svendsen. Head coach: Pete Cutino.
- 2007 Rio de Janeiro
  Merrill Moses (GK), Peter Varellas, Peter Hudnut, Jeff Powers, Adam Wright, Kevin Witt, Ryan Bailey, Tony Azevedo (C), Thomas Hopkins, Layne Beaubien, Jesse Smith, John Mann, Genai Kerr (GK). Head coach: Terry Schroeder.
- 2011 Guadalajara
  Merrill Moses (GK), Peter Varellas, Peter Hudnut, Jeff Powers, Adam Wright, Brian Alexander, Layne Beaubien, Tony Azevedo (C), Ryan Bailey, Tim Hutten, Jesse Smith, J. W. Krumpholz, Chay Lapin (GK). Head coach: Terry Schroeder.
- 2015 Toronto
  Merrill Moses (GK), Nikola Vavić, Alex Obert, Jackson Kimbell, Alex Roelse, Luca Cupido, Josh Samuels, Tony Azevedo (C), Alex Bowen, Bret Bonanni, Jesse Smith, John Mann, McQuin Baron (GK). Head coach: Dejan Udovičić.
- 2019 Lima
  Alex Wolf (GK), Johnny Hooper, Marko Vavic, Alex Obert, Ben Hallock, Luca Cupido, Hannes Daube, Max Irving, Alex Bowen, Chancellor Ramirez, Jesse Smith (C). Head coach: Dejan Udovičić.

== Olympics statistics ==
=== Results by tournament ===
The following table shows results of the United States men's national water polo team at the Olympic Games by tournament.

Games	MP	W	D	L	GF	GA	GD	Win %	Finish	Ref
(France) 1900 Paris	Did not participate									
(United States) 1904 St. Louis	Demonstration event									
(United Kingdom) 1908 London	Did not participate									
(Sweden) 1912 Stockholm	Did not participate									
(Belgium) 1920 Antwerp	5	2	0	3	18	19	-1	40.00%	4th of 12	
(France) 1924 Paris	5	2	0	3	10	11	-1	40.00%	**3rd** of 13	
(Netherlands) 1928 Amsterdam	3	1	0	2	11	7	+4	33.33%	7th of 14	
(United States) 1932 Los Angeles	4	2	1	1	20	12	+8	50.00%	**3rd** of 5	
(Germany) 1936 Berlin	3	1	0	2	7	8	-1	33.33%	9th of 16	
(United Kingdom) 1948 London	3	1	1	1	11	11	0	33.33%	11th of 18	
(Finland) 1952 Helsinki	9	5	0	4	35	31	+4	55.56%	4th of 21	
(Australia) 1956 Melbourne	6	2	0	4	15	23	-8	33.33%	5th of 10	
(Italy) 1960 Rome	7	3	0	4	33	35	-2	42.86%	7th of 16	
(Japan) 1964 Tokyo	3	1	0	2	12	9	+3	33.33%	9th of 13	
1968 Mexico City	8	5	1	2	49	43	+6	62.50%	5th of 15	
(West Germany) 1972 Munich	9	6	2	1	50	38	+12	66.67%	**3rd** of 16	
(Canada) 1976 Montreal	Did not qualify									
(Soviet Union) 1980 Moscow	Qualified but withdrew									
(United States) 1984 Los Angeles	7	6	1	0	65	43	+22	85.71%	**2nd** of 12	
(South Korea) 1988 Seoul	7	5	0	2	71	56	+15	71.43%	**2nd** of 12	
(Spain) 1992 Barcelona	7	4	0	3	48	38	+10	57.14%	4th of 12	
(United States) 1996 Atlanta	8	5	0	3	67	57	+10	62.50%	7th of 12	
(Australia) 2000 Sydney	8	3	0	5	69	68	+1	37.50%	6th of 12	
(Greece) 2004 Athens	7	4	0	3	47	50	-3	57.14%	7th of 12	
(China) 2008 Beijing	7	5	0	2	57	50	+7	71.43%	**2nd** of 12	
(United Kingdom) 2012 London	8	3	0	5	61	70	-9	37.50%	8th of 12	
(Brazil) 2016 Rio de Janeiro	5	2	0	3	35	35	0	40.00%	10th of 12	
Total	129	68	6	55	791	714	+77	52.71%		
Games	MP	W	D	L	GF	GA	GD	Win %	Finish	Ref

==== Historical progression – best finish ====
The following table shows the historical progression of the best finish at the Olympic Games.

Best finish	Achievement	Games	Date	Duration of record	Ref
4th	**Set record**	(Belgium) 1920 Antwerp	Aug 29, 1920	3 years, 326 days	
3rd	**Broke record**	(France) 1924 Paris	Jul 20, 1924	60 years, 21 days	
3rd	Tied record	(United States) 1932 Los Angeles	Aug 13, 1932	60 years, 21 days	
3rd	Tied record	(West Germany) 1972 Munich	Sep 4, 1972	60 years, 21 days	
2nd	**Broke record**	(United States) 1984 Los Angeles	Aug 10, 1984	41 years, 283 days	
2nd	Tied record	(South Korea) 1988 Seoul	Oct 1, 1988	41 years, 283 days	
2nd	Tied record	(China) 2008 Beijing	Aug 24, 2008	41 years, 283 days	

=== Results by opponent ===
The following tables show results of the United States men's national water polo team at the Olympic Games by opponent.

Continent	Medals	First	Latest	MP	W	D	L	GF	GA	GD	Win %	Confederation
Teams from Americas	0	1936	1984	10	9	1	0	70	30	+40	90.00%	ASUA
Teams from Asia	0	1932	2008	4	4	0	0	41	17	+24	100.00%	AASF
Teams from Europe	73	1920	2016	111	52	5	54	645	641	+4	46.85%	LEN
Teams from Oceania	0	1984	2012	4	3	0	1	35	26	+9	75.00%	OSA
Total	73	1920	2016	129	68	6	55	791	714	+77	52.71%	

Team	Medals	First	Latest	MP	W	D	L	GF	GA	GD	Win %	Confederation
Australia	0	1984	2012	4	3	0	1	35	26	+9	75.00%	OSA
Austria	0	1952	1952	1	1	0	0	4	1	+3	100.00%	LEN
**Belgium**^{^}	6	1920	1932	7	2	1	4	20	23	-3	28.57%	LEN
Brazil	0	1964	1984	4	4	0	0	33	11	+22	100.00%	ASUA
Canada	0	1972	1972	1	1	0	0	8	1	+7	100.00%	ASUA
China	0	1988	2008	2	2	0	0	22	11	+11	100.00%	AASF
**Croatia**^{^}	3	1996	2016	7	4	0	3	47	52	-5	57.14%	LEN
Cuba	0	1968	1972	2	1	1	0	13	12	+1	50.00%	ASUA
Czechoslovakia^{†}	0	1992	1992	1	1	0	0	9	3	+6	100.00%	LEN
East Germany^{†}	0	1968	1968	1	1	0	0	6	4	+2	100.00%	LEN
**France**^{^}	4	1924	2016	5	3	0	2	29	19	+10	60.00%	LEN
**Germany**^{^}	3	1932	2008	5	3	1	1	26	20	+6	60.00%	LEN
**Great Britain**^{^}	4	1920	2012	4	3	0	1	28	20	+8	75.00%	LEN
Greece	0	1920	2000	6	5	0	1	61	31	+30	83.33%	LEN
**Hungary**^{^}	15	1928	2012	12	1	0	11	48	90	-42	8.33%	LEN
**Italy**^{^}	8	1952	2016	8	4	0	4	58	59	-1	50.00%	LEN
Japan	0	1932	1932	1	1	0	0	10	0	+10	100.00%	AASF
Kazakhstan	0	2004	2004	1	1	0	0	9	6	+3	100.00%	AASF
Malta	0	1928	1928	1	1	0	0	10	0	+10	100.00%	LEN
Mexico	0	1972	1972	1	1	0	0	7	5	+2	100.00%	ASUA
Montenegro	0	2012	2016	2	1	0	1	13	15	-2	50.00%	LEN
**Netherlands**^{^}	2	1924	2000	7	5	0	2	43	35	+8	71.43%	LEN
Romania	0	1952	2012	5	4	0	1	34	25	+9	80.00%	LEN
**Russia**^{^}	2	2000	2004	2	0	0	2	17	20	-3	0.00%	LEN
**Serbia**^{^}	3	2008	2012	3	1	0	2	18	20	-2	33.33%	LEN
**Serbia and Montenegro**^{^†}	1	1996	2004	3	1	0	2	21	25	-4	33.33%	LEN
**Soviet Union**^{^†}	7	1956	1988	4	1	1	2	18	24	-6	25.00%	LEN
**Spain**^{^}	2	1920	2016	9	4	0	5	62	57	+5	44.44%	LEN
**Sweden**^{^}	3	1920	1952	4	1	0	3	6	19	-13	25.00%	LEN
Ukraine	0	1996	1996	1	1	0	0	9	7	+2	100.00%	LEN
**Unified Team**^{^†}	1	1992	1992	2	0	0	2	9	16	-7	0.00%	LEN
Uruguay	0	1936	1948	2	2	0	0	9	1	+8	100.00%	ASUA
**West Germany**^{^†}	1	1968	1984	3	2	1	0	19	16	+3	66.67%	LEN
**Yugoslavia**^{^†}	8	1952	1988	8	2	1	5	30	40	-10	25.00%	LEN
Total	73	1920	2016	129	68	6	55	791	714	+77	52.71%	
Team	Medals	First	Latest	MP	W	D	L	GF	GA	GD	Win %	Confederation

^{^}Teams that have won at least one Olympic medal are shown in bold.
^{†}Defunct teams are shown in italic.

=== Number of competitors and average age, height & weight ===
The following table shows number of competitors and average age, height & weight at the Olympic Games by tournament.

Games	Competitors	Returning Olympians		Average			Finish	Ref
Games	Number	Number	%	Age	Height	Weight	Finish	Ref
(Belgium) 1920 Antwerp	11	0	0.00%	26 years, 77 days			4th of 12	
(France) 1924 Paris	11	1	9.09%	25 years, 72 days (Note: Average age of 10 competitors.)			**3rd** of 13	
(Netherlands) 1928 Amsterdam	11	4	36.36%	25 years, 364 days (Note: Average age of 9 competitors.)			7th of 14	
(United States) 1932 Los Angeles	7	1	14.29%	26 years, 220 days			**3rd** of 5	
(Germany) 1936 Berlin	9	6	66.67%	29 years, 183 days			9th of 16	
(United Kingdom) 1948 London	8	2	25.00%	31 years, 185 days			11th of 18	
(Finland) 1952 Helsinki	10	0	0.00%	22 years, 77 days			4th of 21	
(Australia) 1956 Melbourne	10	2	20.00%	25 years, 230 days	6 ft 1 in (1.85 m)	182 lb (83 kg)	5th of 10	
(Italy) 1960 Rome	10	4	40.00%	24 years, 361 days	5 ft 11.5 in (1.82 m)	176 lb (80 kg)	7th of 16	
(Japan) 1964 Tokyo	11	2	18.18%	23 years, 204 days	6 ft 0 in (1.83 m)	174 lb (79 kg)	9th of 13	
1968 Mexico City	11	4	36.36%	24 years, 187 days	6 ft 0.5 in (1.84 m)	184 lb (83 kg)	5th of 15	
(West Germany) 1972 Munich	11	7	63.64%	25 years, 152 days	6 ft 1 in (1.85 m)	188 lb (85 kg)	**3rd** of 16	
(United States) 1984 Los Angeles	13	0	0.00%	27 years, 188 days	6 ft 2 in (1.88 m)	192 lb (87 kg)	**2nd** of 12	
(South Korea) 1988 Seoul	13	5	38.46%	27 years, 345 days	6 ft 2.5 in (1.89 m)	201 lb (91 kg)	**2nd** of 12	
(Spain) 1992 Barcelona	13	7	53.85%	28 years, 348 days	6 ft 3.5 in (1.92 m)	203 lb (92 kg)	4th of 12	
(United States) 1996 Atlanta	13	5	38.46%	27 years, 24 days	6 ft 3.5 in (1.92 m)	203 lb (92 kg)	7th of 12	
(Australia) 2000 Sydney	13	6	46.15%	27 years, 353 days	6 ft 3.5 in (1.92 m)	205 lb (93 kg)	6th of 12	
(Greece) 2004 Athens	13	3	23.08%	25 years, 359 days	6 ft 3.5 in (1.92 m)	211 lb (96 kg)	7th of 12	
(China) 2008 Beijing	13	7	53.85%	27 years, 186 days	6 ft 4 in (1.93 m)	218 lb (99 kg)	**2nd** of 12	
(United Kingdom) 2012 London	13	10	76.92%	30 years, 316 days	6 ft 4.5 in (1.94 m)	220 lb (100 kg)	8th of 12	
(Brazil) 2016 Rio de Janeiro	13	4	30.77%	25 years, 251 days	6 ft 4.5 in (1.94 m)	220 lb (100 kg)	10th of 12	
Games	Number	Number	%	Age	Height	Weight	Finish	Ref
Games	Competitors	Returning Olympians		Average			Finish	Ref

==== Historical progression – returning Olympians ====
The following table shows the historical progression of the record of returning Olympians.

Returning Olympians	Achievement	Games	Date	Duration of record	Ref
0	**Set record**	(Belgium) 1920 Antwerp	Aug 24, 1920	3 years, 324 days	
1	**Broke record**	(France) 1924 Paris	Jul 13, 1924	4 years, 24 days	
4	**Broke record**	(Netherlands) 1928 Amsterdam	Aug 6, 1928	8 years, 2 days	
6	**Broke record**	(Germany) 1936 Berlin	Aug 8, 1936	36 years, 19 days	
7	**Broke record**	(West Germany) 1972 Munich	Aug 27, 1972	39 years, 337 days	
7	Tied record	(Spain) 1992 Barcelona	Aug 1, 1992	39 years, 337 days	
7	Tied record	(China) 2008 Beijing	Aug 10, 2008	39 years, 337 days	
10	**Broke record**	(United Kingdom) 2012 London	Jul 29, 2012	13 years, 295 days	

==== Historical progression – average age, height and weight ====
The following table shows the historical progression of the record of average age at the Olympic Games.

Average age	Achievement	Games	Date	Duration of record	Ref
**26 years, 77 days**	**Set record**	(Belgium) 1920 Antwerp	Aug 24, 1920	11 years, 348 days	
**26 years, 220 days**	**Broke record**	(United States) 1932 Los Angeles	Aug 6, 1932	4 years, 2 days	
**29 years, 183 days**	**Broke record**	(Germany) 1936 Berlin	Aug 8, 1936	11 years, 357 days	
**31 years, 185 days**	**Broke record**	(United Kingdom) 1948 London	Jul 30, 1948	77 years, 294 days	

The following table shows the historical progression of the record of average height at the Olympic Games.

Average height	Achievement	Games	Date	Duration of record	Ref
6 ft 1 in (1.85 m)	**Set record**	(Australia) 1956 Melbourne	Nov 28, 1956	27 years, 247 days	
6 ft 1 in (1.85 m)	Tied record	(West Germany) 1972 Munich	Aug 27, 1972	27 years, 247 days	
6 ft 2 in (1.88 m)	**Broke record**	(United States) 1984 Los Angeles	Aug 1, 1984	4 years, 51 days	
6 ft 2.5 in (1.89 m)	**Broke record**	(South Korea) 1988 Seoul	Sep 21, 1988	3 years, 315 days	
6 ft 3.5 in (1.92 m)	**Broke record**	(Spain) 1992 Barcelona	Aug 1, 1992	16 years, 9 days	
6 ft 3.5 in (1.92 m)	Tied record	(United States) 1996 Atlanta	Jul 20, 1996	16 years, 9 days	
6 ft 3.5 in (1.92 m)	Tied record	(Australia) 2000 Sydney	Sep 23, 2000	16 years, 9 days	
6 ft 3.5 in (1.92 m)	Tied record	(Greece) 2004 Athens	Aug 15, 2004	16 years, 9 days	
6 ft 4 in (1.93 m)	**Broke record**	(China) 2008 Beijing	Aug 10, 2008	3 years, 354 days	
6 ft 4.5 in (1.94 m)	**Broke record**	(United Kingdom) 2012 London	Jul 29, 2012	13 years, 295 days	
6 ft 4.5 in (1.94 m)	Tied record	(Brazil) 2016 Rio de Janeiro	Aug 6, 2016	13 years, 295 days	

The following table shows the historical progression of the record of average weight at the Olympic Games.

Average weight	Achievement	Games	Date	Duration of record	Ref
182 lb (83 kg)	**Set record**	(Australia) 1956 Melbourne	Nov 28, 1956	11 years, 321 days	
184 lb (83 kg)	**Broke record**	1968 Mexico City	Oct 14, 1968	3 years, 318 days	
188 lb (85 kg)	**Broke record**	(West Germany) 1972 Munich	Aug 27, 1972	11 years, 340 days	
190 lb (86 kg)	**Broke record**	(United States) 1984 Los Angeles	Aug 1, 1984	4 years, 51 days	
201 lb (91 kg)	**Broke record**	(South Korea) 1988 Seoul	Sep 21, 1988	3 years, 315 days	
203 lb (92 kg)	**Broke record**	(Spain) 1992 Barcelona	Aug 1, 1992	8 years, 53 days	
203 lb (92 kg)	Tied record	(United States) 1996 Atlanta	Jul 20, 1996	8 years, 53 days	
208 lb (94 kg)	**Broke record**	(Australia) 2000 Sydney	Sep 23, 2000	3 years, 327 days	
210 lb (95 kg)	**Broke record**	(Greece) 2004 Athens	Aug 15, 2004	3 years, 361 days	
218 lb (99 kg)	**Broke record**	(China) 2008 Beijing	Aug 10, 2008	3 years, 354 days	
220 lb (100 kg)	**Broke record**	(United Kingdom) 2012 London	Jul 29, 2012	13 years, 295 days	
220 lb (100 kg)	Tied record	(Brazil) 2016 Rio de Janeiro	Aug 6, 2016	13 years, 295 days	

== See also ==
- List of United States men's national water polo team rosters
  - List of United States men's Olympic water polo team rosters
- United States men's Olympic water polo team results
- United States men's Olympic water polo team statistics
  - United States men's Olympic water polo team statistics (appearances)
  - United States men's Olympic water polo team statistics (matches played)
  - United States men's Olympic water polo team statistics (scorers)
  - United States men's Olympic water polo team statistics (goalkeepers)
  - United States men's Olympic water polo team statistics (medalists)
- United States women's national water polo team
- USA Water Polo
- USA Water Polo Hall of Fame
- List of Olympic champions in men's water polo
- List of men's Olympic water polo tournament records and statistics
