= Eric Lindroth =

American water polo player (1951–2019)

Personal information
- Full name: Eric Emil Lindroth
- Born: September 12, 1951 Huntington Beach, CA
- Died: June 17, 2019 (aged 67) San Diego, California
- Height: 188 cm (6 ft 2 in)
- Weight: 86 kg (190 lb)
- Spouse: Deborah Ann Donnelly

Sport
- Sport: Water polo
- College team: Univ. California Los Angeles
- Club: Phillips66 (69-73); Fullerton Aquatic (74-75); Southern Cal All Stars (80-83); Industry Hills
- Coached by: Bill Barnett (Newport Harbor High); Bob Horn (UCLA); Monte Nitzkowski (72 Olympics)
Medal record
Representing the United States
Olympic Games
Bronze medal – third place	1972 Munich	Team competition
Pan American Games
Gold medal – first place	1979 San Juan	Team competition
Silver medal – second place	1975 Mexico City	Team competition

Eric Emil Lindroth (September 12, 1951 – June 17, 2019) was a water polo player from the United States, who competed for the University of California Los Angeles, and won the bronze medal with the Men's National Team at the 1972 Summer Olympics in Munich, West Germany. In 1988, he was inducted into the USA Water Polo Hall of Fame.

== Early life ==
Lindroth was born September 12, 1951, in Huntington Beach, California to Mr. and Mrs. Reynold Lindroth. Eric attended Newport Harbor High School, where he competed in water polo from 1967 to 1968, and was managed and trained by water polo Hall of Fame Coach Bill Barnett. Barnett served as a schoolteacher at Newport Harbor High, and while coaching from 1966 through the 1990s led his water polo teams to 10 California Interscholastic Federation 4A High School Championships. During his High School career, Lindroth was a 1967 and 1968 High School All American, and in 1968 was a California Interscholastic Federation (CIF) Player of the year.

== University of California Los Angeles ==
Graduating in 1973 with a degree in Physical Education, Lindroth attended the University of California Los Angeles, where he helped the UCLA water polo team to NCAA national titles in 1969, 1971 and 1972, competing in Water Polo from around 1969–1972. A dominant team, the UCLA water polo team had a cumulative record of 73–4 record during his time as a player. As a UCLA Freshman in 1969, he played on UCLA's first NCAA national championship team. In the 1971 NCAA championship title, Lindroth scored three goals, and was later chosen as the NCAA Championship Tournament Most valuable player in 1972. At UCLA, he was managed and trained by Hall of Fame Coach and Head UCLA Coach Bob Horn. A long serving coach, Horn coached men's water polo at UCLA from 1965 to 1991.

In national competition, in 1974, Lindroth was the Most Valuable Player at the AAU Sr. National Championships, and the recipient of the James E. Lee Award.

In addition to competing with his High School team, Lindroth represented and trained with club teams, primarily after his years as a High School player, competing with the Philips66 team from 1974 to 1975, the Fullerton team from 1976 to 1979, and Southern California Aquatics from around 1980–1983. While competing with club teams, Lindroth was a member of AAU National Champion teams nine times.

== International competition ==
From 1970 to 1983, Lindroth competed for the U.S. National water polo team. From 1973 to 1976, the U.S. National team was captained by fellow 1972 Munich Olympian Peter Asch. In international competition highlights, Lindroth earned a team silver medal at the 1975 Pan American Games in Mexico City, and a team gold medal at the 1979 Pan American Games in San Juan Puerto Rico. In 1973, 1975, and 1978, Lindroth played for the U.S. on the World Championship Team.

== Olympics ==
=== 1972 Munich Olympics ===
As the youngest member of the water polo team team, Lindroth participated in the 1972 Munich Olympics, where the U.S. won the bronze medal in the Olympic Men's water polo team competition, under Head Coach Monte Nitzkowski and Assistant Coach Art Lambert. The 1972 U.S. men's Olympic water polo team included James Ferguson, who had been a UCLA teammate, Peter Asch, Russel Webb, John Parker, Bruce Bradley, Steven Barnett, Barry Weitzenberg, James Slatton, Gary Sheerer, and Stanley Cole. The U.S. had not stood on the medal podium in water polo since 1932.

In the preliminary rounds at the 1972 Munich Olympics, the U.S. team won over Cuba by a score of 7–6 on August 28 and then defeated Canada on August 29. On August 30, the team defeated Mexico, 7–5. They defeated Yugoslavia 5–3 on August 31, and tied with West Germany 4–4 on September 1. But in a rare loss, the U.S. team went 5–3 to Hungary on September 2. In a closely followed subsequent game, the US Team tied with the future Gold medal winner, the Soviet Union, 6–6 on September 3, leaving the U.S. team disappointed with the tie outcome, but the recipient of the bronze medal. In their Final 1972 Olympic game, the US Team defeated Italy 6–5 on September 4. Russia took the gold medal, and a highly skilled team from Hungary, who had defeated the United States, the silver.

=== 1980 Moscow Olympics ===
Lindroth qualified to play with the U.S. team for the 1980 Moscow Olympics, but the games were boycotted by the U.S.

=== Marriage ===
In August 1976, as Eric Emil Lindroth, he married Deborah Ann Donnelly in greater Los Angeles at the Church of the Good Shepherd. Deborah Donelly was a graduate of Pasadena City College.

Lindroth died June 17, 2019, in San Diego, California of metastatic melanoma, and was survived by his wife Deborah Ann and three children. Memorial services were held at the Church of Rancho Bernardo at Bernardo Plaza Court in Dan Diego on Saturday, July 20.

=== Honors ===
In 1988, he was inducted into the USA Water Polo Hall of Fame, and in 2018 became a member of the University of California Los Angeles Hall of Fame.

== See also ==
- List of Olympic medalists in water polo (men)
