= Russell Webb (water polo) =

American water polo player (born 1945)

Russell Irving Webb
Personal information
- Born: June 1, 1945 (age 81) Los Angeles, California
- Occupation(s): Dentist; Oral Surgeon
- Height: 188 cm (6 ft 2 in)
- Weight: 88 kg (194 lb)

Sport
- Sport: Swimming, Water Polo
- College team: University of California, Los Angeles
- Club: Phillips 66 WPC; Inland Nu-Pike WPC
- Coached by: Bob Horn (UCLA); Monte Nitzkowski (72 Olympics)
Medal record
Representing United States
Men's water polo
Olympic Games
Bronze medal – third place	1972 Munich	Team competition
Men's swimming
Pan American Games
Gold medal – first place	1967 Winnipeg	4x100 m medley
Silver medal – second place	1967 Winnipeg	100 m breaststroke

Russell Irving "Russ" Webb (born June 1, 1945) is a retired water polo player from the United States who competed for the University of California Los Angeles. He played in two consecutive Summer Olympics for his native country, starting with the 1968 Mexico Olympics, where the U.S. team placed fifth. Managed by Olympic Coach Monte Nitzkowski, Webb won a bronze medal with the Men's National Team at the 1972 Summer Olympics in Munich, West Germany, the first since 1932. After graduating from the UCLA School of Dentistry, he had a career in Dentistry.

Russell Webb was born June 1, 1945, to Mr. and Mrs. Irving Webb in Los Angeles, California, and attended Fullerton High School where he competed in water polo from around 1960–1963. In a rare distinction at age 15, in July 1960, Russell qualified as an Eagle Scout for Boy Scout Troop 99 in July, 1960 while living in Yorba Linda, California in greater Los Angeles. His citation was presented to him by Boy Scout representative Harlan Bassett and signed by President Eisenhower.

Webb excelled on the international stage in swimming prior to receiving recognition as a water polo competitor. At the 1967 Pan-American Games, he captured a silver medal in the 100meter breaststroke and a gold in the medley relay.

== University of California Los Angeles ==
Enrolling in 1963, and graduating in 1968, Webb attended and competed for the University of California Los Angeles, where he was coached and trained by UCLA Head Water polo and swimming coach Bob Horn. A long serving coach, Horn coached men's water polo at UCLA from 1965 to 1991.

At UCLA, for three successive years from 1965 to 1967, Webb played on NCAA Championship water polo Teams which were also PAC-8 conference Champions during the same period. During his collegiate years, Webb received All American honors in three years in both swimming and water polo. He established two records for NCAA competition, and the UCLA water polo teams he played for were undefeated during all four years of his playing tenure. Excelling in swimming, Webb acquired nine medals in Athletic Association of Western Universities (AAWU) Conference Championship competitions, which included seven first place medals.

== Olympics ==
=== 1968 Mexico City Olympics ===
Webb competed in the 1968 Mexico City Olympics in water polo where the U.S. team finished fifth overall. Pre-Olympic favorites Yugoslavia took the gold, the Soviet Union took the silver, and Hungary took the bronze.

=== 1972 Munich bronze medal ===
Webb participated in the 1972 Munich Olympics, winning a bronze medal in the Men's water polo Olympic team competition under Head Olympic Coach Monte Nitzkowski and Assistant Coach Art Lambert. The 1972 U.S. men's Olympic water polo team included James Ferguson, Peter Asch, Webb, John Parker, Bruce Bradley, Steven Barnett, Barry Weitzenberg, James Slatton, Gary Sheerer, and Stanley Cole. The U.S. had not stood on the medal podium in water polo since 1932.

=== Career ===
Webb graduated from the UCLA School of Dentistry, in the greater Los Angeles town of Westwood, and later had a career as a Dentist.

=== Honors ===
In 1984, Webb became a member of the USA Water Polo Hall of Fame, and was became a member of the UCLA Athletic Hall of Fame in 2002.

== See also ==
- List of Olympic medalists in water polo (men)
