= James Ferguson (water polo) =

American water polo player (born 1949)

Personal information
- Born: James Michael Ferguson; April 27, 1949 (age 77) Kokomo, Indiana, U.S.
- Occupations: Business Management; Marketing
- Height: 188 cm (6 ft 2 in)
- Weight: 84 kg (185 lb)
- Spouse: Jody
- Children: 3

Sport
- Sport: Swimming, Water Polo
- Position: Driver (Water Polo)
- College team: University of California Los Angeles
- Club: DeAnza Athletic Foundation; Foothill Aquatic Club (WP)
- Coached by: Art Lambert (Awalt High School); Bob Horn (UCLA); Monte Nitzkowski (Olympics)
Medal record
Representing the United States
Olympic Games
Bronze medal – third place	1972 Munich	Team competition
Pan American Games
Gold medal – first place	1971 Cali	Team competition
Silver medal – second place	1975 Mexico City	Team competition

James Michael "Jim" Ferguson (born April 27, 1949) is a retired water polo player from the United States, who represented his native country at the 1972 Munich Olympics where he won a team bronze medal.

== Early life ==
Ferguson was born April 27, 1949, in Kokomo, Indiana, the youngest of four siblings to Mr. and Mrs. George Ferguson. His family immediately moved to Marion, Indiana, and then San Jose, California. Ferguson began competitive swimming by the age of nine, encouraged by his older brother Bill, though his two sisters were also competitive High School swimmers. Graduating around 1967, he attended Awalt High School, in Mountainview, California, where he played water polo from 1964 to 1967 and was coached primarily by USA Water Polo Hall of Fame Coach Art Lambert. By 1967, Awalt had won the Northern California Water Polo Championships in three successive years. During his High School career in Water Polo, Ferguson received the honor of being named the National High School Player of the Year in 1967. At the Central Coast Section Water Polo Tournament, Jim was named the Most Outstanding Player.

In club competition, Ferguson played water polo for the DeAnza Athletic Foundation, and the Foothill Aquatic Club, primarily from 1968 to 1976 where he was coached by Art Lambert.

In international competition, Ferguson received a team gold medal at the 1971 Pan American Games in Cali, Colombia, and later a silver medal at the 1975 Pan American Games in 1975 in Ciudad de Mexico.

Ferguson was selected as an alternate for the 1968 U.S. Olympic team, but did not participate in the games.

== University of California Los Angeles ==
Ferguson attended the University of California Los Angeles, graduating in 1972 with a degree in economics. He played on UCLA's water polo team from 1968 to 1970 where he was mentored by USA Water Polo Hall of Fame Coach Bob Horn and made All American honors in successive years from 1968 to 1970. During his time at UCLA, Ferguson helped lead the team to an NCAA team water polo championship in 1969. As one of UCLA's greatest collegiate players, while playing the driver position, he established new records for all-time collegiate assists and goals scored, and received the Robert Lee Starr Memorial Award in both 1969 and 1970.

== 1972 Munich Olympic bronze ==
In the 1972 Summer Olympics in Munich, West Germany, Ferguson was co-captain of the USA Team that won a bronze medal. The U.S. team was managed by Hall of Fame Head Coach Monte Nitzkowski, a former competitor for Long Beach City College, and assisted by Art Lambert, who had served as Ferguson's coach with the water polo team at the DeAnza Athletic Club. As a valuable Olympic team member, Ferguson was second in Olympic goals, scoring a total of nine. The 1972 Olympic water polo team included Ferguson, Peter Asch, Russel Webb, John Parker, Bruce Bradley, Steven Barnett, Barry Weitzenberg, James Slatton, Gary Sheerer, and Stanley Cole. The U.S. had not stood on the medal podium in water polo since 1932.

The water polo team completed the early Olympic rounds unbeaten with a record of 5–0, which included a win over the defending Olympic championship team Hungary. In later rounds, the American team finished with tie games against pre-game favorites West Germany and the Soviet Union, which ended their chances for winning the gold medal. However, they qualified to compete against the team from Italy in the bronze medal match, later beating the Italian team by a score of 6–5 to capture the bronze, with Olympic teammate Gary Sheerer scoring two goals. The pre-game favorite team from the Soviet Union took the gold, with Hungary taking the silver medal. America captured its fourth third-place bronze in water polo, but their first medal since 1932.In 1973 Ferguson was selected to the All World Team. In a brutal and demanding sport, Ferguson was hospitalized in a game against Yugoslavia with thirty stitches, and had been hospitalized with other injuries including a cut to his eye.

Ferguson retired from athletics not long after the 1972 Olympics.

=== Later pursuits and career ===
Ferguson played Master's Water Polo, and placed second in a 2006 World Master's Water Polo Game in 2006, where he competed with several other former UCLA players. Ferguson served with Superior Industries as a Marketing Vice-President around 2007.

=== Honors ===
In 1984, Ferguson was made a member of the U.S. Water Polo Hall of Fame and became a member of the International Water Polo Hall of Fame in 1992. He received the honor of becoming a member of the UCLA Sports Hall of Fame in 2007. In October 2015, Ferguson he was named to the Pac-12 All Century Team as an exceptional collegiate driver/attacker.

== See also ==
- List of Olympic medalists in water polo (men)
