= Water polo at the Pan American Games =

- No. of events: 2 (men: 1; women: 1)

Water polo has been inducted in the Pan American Games since the first edition of the multi-sports event in 1951 when Buenos Aires was the host. The women's event made its debut in 1999. The United States is the most successful country, winning 16 out of 22 tournaments.

== Men's tournament ==
Men's water polo at the Pan American Games
| Year | Host | Gold | Silver | Bronze |
|---|---|---|---|---|
| 1951; Details | Seoul, South Korea | Argentina | Brazil | United States |
| 1955; Details | Mumbai, India | Argentina | United States | Brazil |
| 1959; Details | Jakarta, Indonesia | United States | Argentina | Brazil |
| 1963; Details | Bangkok, Thailand | Brazil | United States | Argentina |
| 1967; Details | Taipe, Taiwan, China | United States | Brazil | Mexico |
| 1971; Details | Cali, Colombia | United States | Cuba | Mexico |
| 1975; Details | Mexico City, Mexico | Mexico | United States | Cuba |
| 1979; Details | San Juan, Puerto Rico | United States | Cuba | Canada |
| 1983; Details | Caracas, Venezuela | United States | Cuba | Canada |
| 1987; Details | Indianapolis, United States | United States | Cuba | Brazil |
| 1991; Details | Havana, Cuba | Cuba | United States | Brazil |
| 1995; Details | Mar del Plata, Argentina | United States | Brazil | Cuba |
| 1999; Details | Winnipeg, Canada | United States | Cuba | Canada |
| 2003; Details | Santo Domingo, Dominican Republic | United States | Brazil | Canada |
| 2007; Details | Rio de Janeiro, Brazil | United States | Brazil | Canada |
| 2011; Details | Guadalajara, Mexico | United States | Canada | Brazil |
| 2015; Details | Toronto, Canada | United States | Brazil | Canada |
| 2019; Details | Lima, Peru | United States | Canada | Brazil |
| 2023; Details | Santiago, Chile | United States | Brazil | Argentina |

=== Participating nations ===
| Nation | 1951 | 1955 | 1959 | 1963 | 1967 | 1971 | 1975 | 1979 | 1983 | 1987 | 1991 | 1995 | 1999 | 2003 | 2007 | 2011 | 2015 | 2019 | 2023 | Years |
|---|---|---|---|---|---|---|---|---|---|---|---|---|---|---|---|---|---|---|---|---|
| Argentina | 1st place, gold medalist(s) | 1st place, gold medalist(s) | 2nd place, silver medalist(s) | 3rd place, bronze medalist(s) | | 6 | | | | | 7 | 5 | 7 | 6 | 6 | 5 | 4 | 4 | 3rd place, bronze medalist(s) | 14 |
| Brazil | 2nd place, silver medalist(s) | 3rd place, bronze medalist(s) | 3rd place, bronze medalist(s) | 1st place, gold medalist(s) | 2nd place, silver medalist(s) | 4 | | 6 | 4 | 3rd place, bronze medalist(s) | 3rd place, bronze medalist(s) | 2nd place, silver medalist(s) | 4 | 2nd place, silver medalist(s) | 2nd place, silver medalist(s) | 3rd place, bronze medalist(s) | 2nd place, silver medalist(s) | 3rd place, bronze medalist(s) | 2nd place, silver medalist(s) | 18 |
| British West Indies | | | 5 | | | | | | | | | | | | | | | | | 1 |
| Canada | | | | 4 | 5 | 5 | 4 | 3rd place, bronze medalist(s) | 3rd place, bronze medalist(s) | 4 | 4 | 4 | 3rd place, bronze medalist(s) | 3rd place, bronze medalist(s) | 3rd place, bronze medalist(s) | 2nd place, silver medalist(s) | 3rd place, bronze medalist(s) | 2nd place, silver medalist(s) | 4 | 16 |
| Chile | 5 | | | | | | | | | | | | | | | | | | 8 | 2 |
| Colombia | | | | | 6 | | | | 6 | | | | 5 | 7 | 5 | 7 | | | | 6 |
| Cuba | | | | | 4 | 2nd place, silver medalist(s) | 3rd place, bronze medalist(s) | 2nd place, silver medalist(s) | 2nd place, silver medalist(s) | 2nd place, silver medalist(s) | 1st place, gold medalist(s) | 3rd place, bronze medalist(s) | 2nd place, silver medalist(s) | | 4 | 4 | 7 | 5 | 7 | 14 |
| Dominican Republic | | | | | | | | | | | | | | 8 | | | | | | 1 |
| Ecuador | | | | | | | | | | | | | | | | | 8 | | | 1 |
| Jamaica | | | | | | | | | | | 8 | | | | | | | | | 1 |
| Mexico | 4 | 4 | 4 | 5 | 3rd place, bronze medalist(s) | 3rd place, bronze medalist(s) | 1st place, gold medalist(s) | 5 | 5 | 5 | 5 | 6 | 8 | 5 | 7 | 6 | 5 | 7 | 6 | 19 |
| Netherlands Antilles | | 5 | | | | | | | | | | | | | | | | | | 1 |
| Peru | | | | | | | | | | | | | | | | | | 8 | | 1 |
| Puerto Rico | | | | | | | 5 | 4 | 7 | 6 | 6 | 7 | 6 | 4 | 8 | | | 6 | 5 | 11 |
| United States | 3rd place, bronze medalist(s) | 2nd place, silver medalist(s) | 1st place, gold medalist(s) | 2nd place, silver medalist(s) | 1st place, gold medalist(s) | 1st place, gold medalist(s) | 2nd place, silver medalist(s) | 1st place, gold medalist(s) | 1st place, gold medalist(s) | 1st place, gold medalist(s) | 2nd place, silver medalist(s) | 1st place, gold medalist(s) | 1st place, gold medalist(s) | 1st place, gold medalist(s) | 1st place, gold medalist(s) | 1st place, gold medalist(s) | 1st place, gold medalist(s) | 1st place, gold medalist(s) | 1st place, gold medalist(s) | 19 |
| Venezuela | | | | | | | | | 8 | | | | | | | 8 | 6 | | | 3 |
| Nations | 5 | 5 | 5 | 5 | 6 | 6 | 5 | 6 | 8 | 6 | 8 | 7 | 8 | 8 | 8 | 8 | 8 | 8 | 8 | —N/a |

== Women's tournament ==
Women's water polo at the Pan American Games
| Year | Host | Gold | Silver | Bronze |
|---|---|---|---|---|
| 1999; Details | Winnipeg, Canada | Canada | United States | Brazil |
| 2003; Details | Santo Domingo, Dominican Republic | United States | Canada | Brazil |
| 2007; Details | Rio de Janeiro, Brazil | United States | Canada | Cuba |
| 2011; Details | Guadalajara, Mexico | United States | Canada | Brazil |
| 2015; Details | Toronto, Canada | United States | Canada | Brazil |
| 2019; Details | Lima, Peru | United States | Canada | Brazil |
| 2023; Details | Santiago, Chile | United States | Canada | Brazil |

=== Participating nations ===
| Nation | 1999 | 2003 | 2007 | 2011 | 2015 | 2019 | 2023 | Years |
|---|---|---|---|---|---|---|---|---|
| Argentina | | | | 7 | 8 | | 4 | 3 |
| Brazil | 3rd place, bronze medalist(s) | 3rd place, bronze medalist(s) | 4 | 3rd place, bronze medalist(s) | 3rd place, bronze medalist(s) | 3rd place, bronze medalist(s) | 3rd place, bronze medalist(s) | 7 |
| Canada | 1st place, gold medalist(s) | 2nd place, silver medalist(s) | 2nd place, silver medalist(s) | 2nd place, silver medalist(s) | 2nd place, silver medalist(s) | 2nd place, silver medalist(s) | 2nd place, silver medalist(s) | 7 |
| Chile | | | | | | | 8 | 1 |
| Cuba | 4 | 4 | 3rd place, bronze medalist(s) | 4 | 4 | 4 | 6 | 7 |
| Mexico | | | | 6 | 6 | 6 | 5 | 4 |
| Peru | | | | | | 8 | | 1 |
| Puerto Rico | 5 | 5 | 5 | 5 | 5 | 5 | 7 | 7 |
| United States | 2nd place, silver medalist(s) | 1st place, gold medalist(s) | 1st place, gold medalist(s) | 1st place, gold medalist(s) | 1st place, gold medalist(s) | 1st place, gold medalist(s) | 1st place, gold medalist(s) | 7 |
| Venezuela | | | 6 | 8 | 7 | 7 | | 4 |
| Nations | 5 | 5 | 6 | 8 | 8 | 8 | 8 | —N/a |

== Medal table ==
=== Men ===
| Rank | Nation | Gold | Silver | Bronze | Total |
|---|---|---|---|---|---|
| 1 | United States | 14 | 4 | 1 | 19 |
| 2 | Argentina | 2 | 1 | 2 | 5 |
| 3 | Brazil | 1 | 7 | 6 | 14 |
| 4 | Cuba | 1 | 5 | 2 | 8 |
| 5 | Mexico | 1 | 0 | 2 | 3 |
| 6 | Canada | 0 | 2 | 6 | 8 |
| Totals (6 entries) | | 19 | 19 | 19 | 57 |

=== Women ===
| Rank | Nation | Gold | Silver | Bronze | Total |
|---|---|---|---|---|---|
| 1 | United States | 6 | 1 | 0 | 7 |
| 2 | Canada | 1 | 6 | 0 | 7 |
| 3 | Brazil | 0 | 0 | 6 | 6 |
| 4 | Cuba | 0 | 0 | 1 | 1 |
| Totals (4 entries) | | 7 | 7 | 7 | 21 |

=== Total ===
| Rank | Nation | Gold | Silver | Bronze | Total |
|---|---|---|---|---|---|
| 1 | United States | 20 | 5 | 1 | 26 |
| 2 | Argentina | 2 | 1 | 2 | 5 |
| 3 | Canada | 1 | 8 | 6 | 15 |
| 4 | Brazil | 1 | 7 | 12 | 20 |
| 5 | Cuba | 1 | 5 | 3 | 9 |
| 6 | Mexico | 1 | 0 | 2 | 3 |
| Totals (6 entries) | | 26 | 26 | 26 | 78 |

== See also ==
- UANA Water Polo Cup
- Swimming Union of the Americas
