= James Slatton =

American water polo player (born 1947)

Personal information
- Full name: James Walter Slatton
- Born: July 30, 1947 (age 78) Los Angeles, California, U.S.
- Occupation: Securities Analyst
- Spouse: Francine

Sport
- Sport: Water Polo
- Position: Goalkeeper (WP)
- College team: University of California Los Angeles
- Club: Philips66 WP Club
- Coached by: Urho Saari (El Segundo High); Bob Horn (UCLA); Monte Nitzkowski (72 Olympics)
Medal record
Men's water polo
Representing the United States
Olympic Games
| Bronze medal – third place | 1972 Munich | Team competition |

James Walter "Jim" Slatton (born July 30, 1947) is a retired water polo player from the United States who competed for UCLA, and won the bronze medal with the Men's National Team at the 1972 Summer Olympics in Munich, West Germany. He later had a career as a Securities Analyst.

Slatton was born July 30, 1947 in Los Angeles, California and attended El Segundo High School. At El Segundo, he played water polo for Coach Urho Saari, winning the Pioneer League Championship in his Sophomore year. Slatton was twice an All-CIF honoree by his Senior year, and helped lead his High School team to two CIF titles as goalkeeper in 1963 and 1964.

In club play, Slatton trained and competed with the Philips66 Water Polo Club in Long Beach, beginning in 1962 during his High School years, and continuing through around 1986.

== University of California Los Angeles ==
A 1970 graduate, Slatton attended and played water polo as a goaltender for the University of California Los Angeles under Hall of Fame UCLA Head Coach Bob Horn from 1966-1968. At UCLA, Slatton helped lead the team to Championships in both 1966 and 1967, though they were not yet officially sanctioned by the UCLA. Slatton was a recipient of All American Honors at UCLA in 1966, 1967, and 1968. In November 1966 while at UCLA, he was named a first team All-Pacific Athletic Conference honoree.

Slatton was chosen for the U.S. 1967 Pan American team as an alternate.

== 1972 Olympic bronze ==
Slatton played for the U.S. team at the 1972 Summer Olympics as a goaltender under Head Coach and former UCLA player Monte Nitzkowski. The U.S. team won the bronze medal in the Olympic Men's Water Polo Team competition after several close games. Members of the team included Peter Asch, high scoring Bruce Bradley, who had been a water polo team mate at UCLA, Captain Gary Sheerer, Stanley Cole, another former UCLA team mate, Russell Webb, Barry Weitzenberg and James Ferguson. A number of American players interviewed after the Olympics believed the European referees held a slight bias against the U.S. team.

In preliminary games at the 1972 Munich Olympics, the U.S. Water Polo Team defeated Cuba 7–6 on August 28, and then defeated Canada on August 29. On August 30, the U.S. team defeated Mexico, 7–5. They defeated Yugoslavia 5–3 on August 31, and tied with West Germany 4–4 on September 1. In a disappointing loss, the Americans went 5–3 to a strong team from Hungary on September 2. In a closely followed game, the US tied with the future Gold medal winner, the Soviet Union, 6–6 on September 3, The American Team leaving several American team members greatly disappointed with the tie. In their Final 1972 Olympic game on September 4, the Americans defeated Italy 6–5 on September 4, with Slatton credited with six important saves to help secure the close victory. Russia took the gold medal, and a highly skilled team from Hungary, who had defeated the United States, the silver.

Slatton served with the U.S. Navy as an officer, and spent time as a Lieutenant Junior Grade on the Aircraft Carrier, USS Hancock.

After graduating UCLA, Slatton worked as a securities analyst. He and his wife Francine, have a daughter, Yvette.

=== Honors ===
In 1999, he was inducted into the USA Water Polo Hall of Fame.

== See also ==
- List of Olympic medalists in water polo (men)
- List of men's Olympic water polo tournament goalkeepers
