= Sylvio dos Santos =

Brazilian swimmer and water polo player

Personal information
- Full name: Sylvio Kelly dos Santos
- Nationality: Brazil
- Born: 15 July 1935 Brazil
- Died: 4 November 2016 (aged 81)

Sport
- Sport: Swimming
- Strokes: Freestyle
Medal record
Men's swimming
Men's Water polo
Representing Brazil
Pan American Games
Bronze medal – third place	1959 Chicago	Water polo

Sylvio Kelly dos Santos (15 July 1935 – 4 November 2016) was a Brazilian sportsman. He competed in two Olympics. He represented Brazil in swimming at the 1952 and 1956 Olympics and in water polo at the 1959 Pan American Games.

He was brother of Márvio dos Santos, who competed at three Summer Olympics in water polo.

At the 1952 Summer Olympics in Helsinki, he swam the 1500-metre and the 4×200-metre freestyle, not reaching the final.

At the 1956 Summer Olympics in Melbourne, he swam the 400-metre freestyle, not reaching the final.

At the 1959 Pan American Games in Chicago, he won the bronze medal in water polo.

He broke the Brazilian record in the 1500-metre freestyle, in Helsinki at the 1952 Summer Olympics.
