= Andrew McDonald (water polo) =

American water polo player (born 1955)

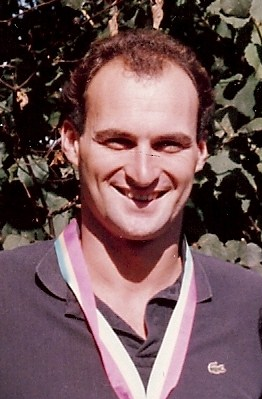
- Drew McDonald with his Olympic medal, c. Fall 1984

Personal information
- Full name: Andrew John McDonald
- Born: October 19, 1955 (age 70) Vancouver, British Columbia, Canada
- Occupation(s): U.S. Water Polo Director; CEO, McDonald Capital Investments
- Height: 195 cm (6 ft 5 in)
- Weight: 91 kg (201 lb)
- Spouse(s): Kim Peyton (deceased '86); Carol Shurtz
- Children: Spenser and Devon

Sport
- Sport: Water Polo
- College team: Stanford University
- Coached by: Art Lambert (Stanford)
Medal record
Men's water polo
Representing the United States
Olympic Games
Silver medal – second place	1984 Los Angeles	Men's water polo
Pan American Games
Gold medal – first place	1979 San Juan	Men's water polo
Gold medal – first place	1983 Caracas	Men's water polo

Andrew John "Drew" McDonald (born October 19, 1955) is a former water polo player who won a silver medal for the United States at the 1984 Summer Olympics in Los Angeles, California. A U.S. Hall of Fame member, he has coached basketball, served as an advisor to the US Olympic Committee, and was a United States Water Polo Foundation Director beginning in 1985. In his professional career, after graduating Stanford with a Masters in Industrial engineering, he founded his own company McDonald Capital Investments.

== Early years ==
Andrew John "Drew" McDonald was born on October 19, 1955, in Vancouver, British Columbia, Canada. In his early years, his family relocated to Orinda, California. He attended Orinda's Miramonte High School, where for three years, he earned High School All-League honors in water polo, and was a two-year High School All American.

== Stanford University ==
He attended Stanford University, where he graduated with a degree in psychology in 1977 and a Master of Science in industrial engineering in 1980. Playing for Head Coach Art Lambert, McDonald helped lead the Stanford water polo team to their inaugural 1976 NCAA title, an important event in Stanford sport's history. In the 1975 and 1976 Stanford seasons, he was named an All-American. During his college years, he met his first wife Kim Peyton McDonald, an Olympic gold medalist from the 1976 Montreal Summer Olympics in the 4 × 100 m freestyle relay, though the couple later divorced. He is married to Carol Shurtz McDonald, a Chico State graduate. They have two children: Spenser and Devon McDonald.

For eight years from 1977 to 1984, McDonald was a member of the U.S. Water Polo national team. He participated in two Pan American Games. In 1979, he played on the US Pan American team, which won the gold medal in San Juan, Puerto Rico. In 1983, he won the Pan American gold medal with the US team in Caracas, Venezuela.

== Olympics ==
McDonald qualified for the 1980 Moscow Olympic team, but the games were cancelled that year due to an American boycott.

=== 1984 Olympic Silver medal ===
He won a silver medal with the U.S. water polo team at the 1984 Summer Olympics in the Men's water polo tournament where he was coached by Hall of Fame and Olympic Head Coach Monte Nitzkowski. The teams from Yugoslavia, Italy, the Soviet Union, Hungary and Spain were the pre-Olympic favorites to medal in water polo. Responding to the U.S. boycott of the 1980 Moscow Olympics, the teams from Hungary and Russia did not attend in 1984. The U.S. and Yugoslavia won their first three matches, and met in the final game to determine who would take the gold and silver medals. Going into the third quarter of play, the U.S. team held a late 5–2 advantage over Yugoslavia, but were unable to make another goal, and Yugoslavia tied the score 5–5 with three unanswered goals, and were chosen the winners on score differential. Yugoslavia took the gold, West Germany the Bronze and Spain placed fourth.

=== Honors ===
McDonald was named to the Stanford Athletic Hall of Fame in 1982 and the USA Water Polo Hall of Fame in 1991. He received numerous honors as an AAU All American in outdoor water polo competition, during his collegiate and Olympic career and beyond, which included the years 1976, 1978, 1979-1983, and 1986.

== Careers ==
McDonald coached boys varsity basketball at Miramonte High School in Orinda, California from 2012 to 2016. He has worked as an assistant coach for the boys basketball team at Campolindo High School in Moraga, California.

Using his Stanford degree in Economics, his anchor career remained in business management, and he later had a career with his own company McDonald Capital Investors.

=== Olympic committee work ===
For four years, McDonald served on the Athletes Advisory Council to the US Olympic Committee, and served as the United States Water Polo Foundation Director after 1985, with some focus on investment strategies.

== See also ==
- List of Olympic medalists in water polo (men)
