= 1972 NCAA Men's Water Polo Championship =

Water polo tournament season

Tournament details
- Dates: December 1972
- Teams: 8

Final positions
- Champions: UCLA (3rd title)
- Runners-up: UC Irvine
- Third place: San José State
- Fourth place: USC

Tournament statistics
- Matches played: 13
- Goals scored: 331 (25.46 per match)
- Top goal scorer(s): Jim Kruse, UCI (31)

Awards
- Best player: Eric Lindroth, UCLA

The 1972 NCAA Men's Water Polo Championship was the fourth annual NCAA Men's Water Polo Championship to determine the national champion of NCAA men's college water polo. Tournament matches were played at the Armond H. Seidler Natatorium in Albuquerque, New Mexico during December 1972.

UCLA defeated UC Irvine in the final, 10–5, to win their third, and second consecutive, national title.

The leading scorer for the tournament was Jim Kruse from UC Irvine (31 goals). The Most Outstanding Player of the tournament was Eric Lindroth from UCLA. Additionally, an All-Tournament Team was named for the first time this year.

== Qualification ==
Since there has only ever been one single national championship for water polo, all NCAA men's water polo programs (whether from Division I, Division II, or Division III) were eligible. A total of 8 teams were invited to contest this championship.

Team	Appearance	Previous
Loyola–Chicago	1st	Never
New Mexico	2nd	1971
San José State	3rd	1971
UC Irvine	4th	1971
UC Santa Barbara	3rd	1970
USC	3rd	1970
UCLA	4th	1971
Yale	2nd	1969

== Bracket ==
- Site: Armond H. Seidler Natatorium, Albuquerque, New Mexico

=== Championship Bracket ===
First round
UCLA	21
Yale	3
UC Irvine (2OT)	16
UC Santa Barbara	12
USC	17
New Mexico	7
San José State	21
Loyola–Chicago	6

Championship semifinals
UCLA	15
UC Irvine	10
USC	14
San José State (2OT)	19

Championship
UCLA	10
San José State	5
Second place
San José State	12
UC Irvine	14

=== Consolation Bracket ===
- Winner advanced to the Second Place Final against the loser of the Championship.

Consolation first round
New Mexico	17
Loyola–Chicago	12
Yale	2
UC Santa Barbara	21

Consolation semifinals
UC Irvine	23
New Mexico	9
USC	15
UC Santa Barbara	10

Consolation final
UC Irvine	12
USC	8

== All-tournament teams ==
=== First team ===
- Eric Lindroth, UCLA (Most Outstanding Player)
- Bruce Black, UC Irvine
- Kevin Craig, UCLA
- Jack Dickmann, UC Irvine
- Brad Jackson, San José State
- Jim Kruse, UC Irvine
- Dennis Needleman, USC

=== Second team ===
- Garth Bergeson, UCLA
- Curt Caldwell, USC
- Greg Carey, UC Santa Barbara
- Lucky Linder, USC
- Scott Massey, UCLA
- Ed Samuels, San José State
- Steve Spencer, San José State

== See also ==
- NCAA Men's Water Polo Championship
