= Joseph Vargas =

American water polo player (born 1955)

Personal information
- Full name: Joseph Michael Vargas
- Born: October 4, 1955 (age 70) Los Angeles, California, U.S.
- Occupation: Real Estate Broker
- Height: 190 cm (6 ft 3 in)
- Weight: 89 kg (196 lb)

Sport
- Sport: Water Polo
- Position: Field; Likely Driver/Attacker (WP)
- College team: University of California Los Angeles
- Club: Newport Water Polo Club
- Coached by: Bill Barnett (Newport WP Club); Bob Horn (UCLA); Monte Nitzkowski ('84 Olympics)
Medal record
Men's water polo
Representing the United States
Olympic Games
Silver medal – second place	1984 Los Angeles	Men's water polo

Joseph Michael "Joe" Vargas (born October 4, 1955, in Los Angeles, California) is an American former water polo player who competed for the University of California at Los Angeles and participated in the 1984 Summer Olympics in Los Angeles, where the U.S. team won the silver medal in the Men's water polo competition. In 1992, he was inducted into the USA Water Polo Hall of Fame, and later had a career as a real estate broker.

Vargas was born October 4, 1955 in Los Angeles, California into a family two brothers that excelled in water polo. Graduating in 1973, Joe attended Los Altos High School in Hacienda Heights where he played water polo from 1969-1972. During his High School years, he received All-California Interscholastic Federation honors as a Senior in 1972. From an athletic family, his younger brother John Vargas was part of the U.S. Olympic water polo team in 1992 and brother Chris also played water polo.

== College ==
Vargas began his collegiate career playing water polo for Mt. San Antonio College in Walnut, California, where he was a 1974 All American for Junior Colleges. He later attended classes and competed in water polo after transferring to the University of California Los Angeles where he was managed and trained by Head Coach Bob Horn. While at UCLA, he was the recipient of All-American honors in both 1975 and 1976.

While playing for UCLA, Vargas ascended to the international stage from 1975-1984, becoming a member of the US national team. In international competition, he played with the U.S. team at the 1979 Pan American Games in San Juan Puerto Rico, winning a gold medal, and again played with the U.S. team at the 1983 Pan American Games in Caracas, Venezuela that won a second gold medal. He played at the 1979 FINA World Cup in Belgrade, Yugoslavia winning a silver medal, and with the U.S. team at the 1983 FINA World Cup in Malibu California. He was on the U.S. team that placed fifth at the 1978 World Games in Berlin, Germany, and that won the silver medal at the 1982 World Games in Guayaquil, Ecuador.

In Club play from 1975 through his retirement from water polo in 1986, Vargas competed in water polo with the Southern California All Stars, and with the strong regional team, the Newport Water Polo Club where a primary instructor and trainer was USA Water Polo Hall of Fame Coach William "Bill" Barnett.

== Olympics ==
=== 1980 Moscow ===
Vargas qualified to represent the U.S. water polo team at the 1980 Summer Olympics in Moscow, but the U.S. boycotted the games, and did not attend.

=== 1984 Los Angeles silver ===
Four years later, he competed in the 1984 Summer Olympics in Los Angeles winning a team silver medal in the Olympic Men's water polo competition, under Head Olympic Coach Monte Nitzkowski. Yugoslavia, Italy, the Soviet Union, Hungary and Spain were the pre-Olympic favorites to medal in water polo. Responding to the U.S. boycott of the 1980 Moscow Olympics, the teams from Hungary and Russia did not attend in 1984.

The U.S. and Yugoslavia won their first three matches. Playing Greece in their first preliminary game, Vargas scored three goals, leading the U.S. team to a 12-5 victory. After their preliminary victories, the U.S. and Yugoslavia met in the final game to determine who would take the gold and silver medals. In the final game, going into the third quarter of play, the U.S. team held a late 5-2 advantage over Yugoslavia, but were unable to make another goal, and Yugoslavia tied the score 5-5 with three unanswered goals. Yugoslavia took the gold having scored more total points in the tournament, West Germany the Bronze and Spain placed fourth.

=== Honors ===
Vargas became a member of the USA Water Polo Hall of Fame in 1992. Subsequent to his years of collegiate play, while on the U.S. National team in 1979, he received Most Valuable Player honors as part of the James E. Lee Memorial Award, and in the same year was voted the Amateur Athlete of the Year for Southern California.

=== Professional career ===
Vargas worked for the Cushman and Wakeman Company as a Real Estate broker.

== See also ==
- List of Olympic medalists in water polo (men)
