= Christopher Dorst =

American water polo player (born 1956)

Christopher Taylor Dorst
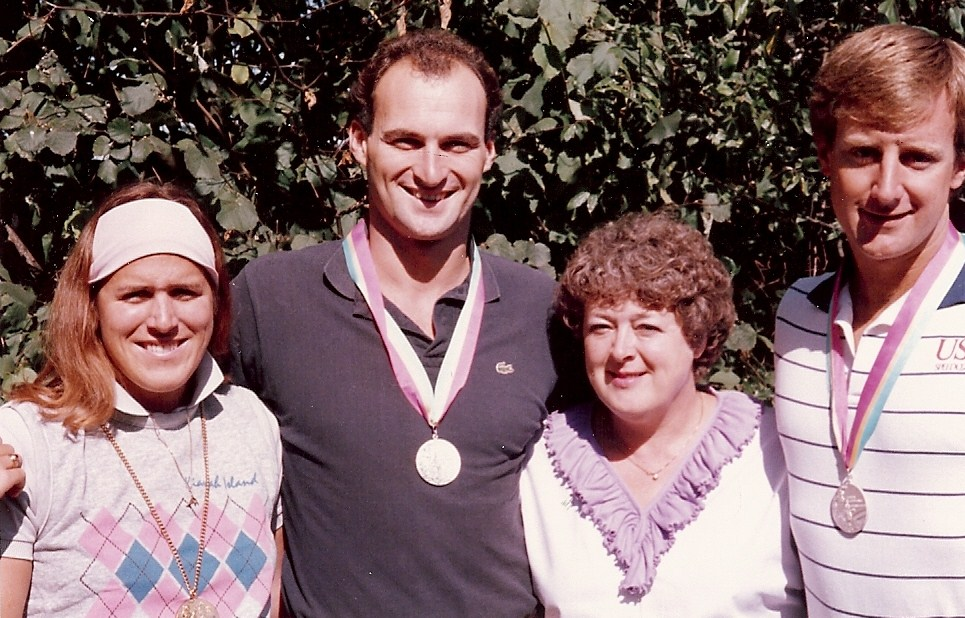
- Kim Peyton-McDonald, Drew McDonald, Barbara Peyton and Chris Dorst shown here with their Olympic medals. circa Fall 1984

Personal information
- Nationality: American
- Born: June 5, 1956 (age 70)
- Education: Stanford BA (77), MBA (79)
- Occupations: Sport & Technology Management
- Height: 193 cm (6 ft 4 in)
- Weight: 86 kg (190 lb)
- Spouse: Marybeth Linzmeier Dorst
- Children: Daughters

Sport
- Sport: Water Polo
- Position: Goalkeeper
- College team: Stanford University
- Club: Stanford AC
- Coached by: Art Lambert (Stanford); Monte Nitzkowski (84 Olympics)
Medal record
Men's water polo
Representing the United States
Olympic Games
Silver medal – second place	1984 Los Angeles	Men's water polo

Christopher Taylor Dorst (born June 5, 1956) is an American former water polo player who competed for Stanford University and participated in the 1984 Olympics winning a team silver medal in water polo.

Chris Dorst was born June 5, 1956, to Christopher and Ann Dorst. He was a 1974 graduate of Menlo-Atherton High School, where he served as Class President, and participated as a goalkeeper with their strong Water Polo team from 1971 to 1974. Dorst was an All-American High School water polo goaltender from 1971 to 1972.

== Stanford University ==
He later attended Stanford as an undergraduate from around 1973–1977, participating in their Water Polo program, where he was an All American NCAA goalie from 1975 to 1976, and was coached by USA Water Polo Hall of Fame Coach Art Lambert, who also served as an Olympic Coach. Lambert was assisted as Stanford Water Polo coach by Dante Dettamanti in 1977–78. The Stanford team won an NCAA Water Polo Championship during Dorst's tenure in 1976 and amassed a record of 55-17 between 1974 and 1976. Dorst received a master's degree in Business Administration from Stanford in 1979.

== 1984 Olympic silver medal ==
Chris Dorst won a silver medal in the Men's 1984 U.S. Olympic water polo event at the 1984 Summer Olympics in Los Angeles, California where he was coached by former Olympian and 1984 Olympic water polo head coach Monte Nitzkowski, who had a long career as water polo coach for Long Beach City College. Hungary, Yugoslavia, Italy, and the Soviet Union were favorites to take the Gold medal in 1984, but neither the USSR nor Hungary attended the 1984 Olympics, boycotting the U.S. games likely as a result of the U.S. boycotting the 1980 Moscow Olympics. Yugoslavia took the gold medal, with West Germany taking the bronze.

Dorst had previously qualified to travel with the US Olympic Team for the 1980 Summer Olympics, who were gold medal favorites, but due to the U.S. boycott of the Moscow Olympics, the U.S. team did not participate that year.

Dorst won a silver medal as part of the U.S. National team at the 1979 Summer Pan American games in San Juan, Puerto, Rico.

=== Honors ===
Dorst is a member of the Stanford University Hall of Fame, and became a member of the USA Water Polo Hall of Fame in 1989.

=== Post athletic careers ===
After graduating Stanford in 1977 he received an MBA from the University in 1982, later working in the fields of sport and technology management. He has served on the Board of Directors, the Executive Committee and the Athlete's Advisory Counsil with America's Olympic Committee. An active alumni, he has also served as a board member with the Stanford Foundation for Water Polo, and has worked as a volunteer water polo coach for a girl's high school team.

Dorst married former Stanford distance swimmer Marybeth Linzmeier in March 1988 at the Church of the Nativity in Menlo Park, California. As noted, he has stayed active as an administrator for the U.S. Olympic committee. The couple had daughters who competed in athletics and played collegiate water polo. At the time of his 1988 marriage, Dorst had begun his career in sports administration and was working as a Vice-President for U.S. Water Polo, Inc.

== See also ==
- List of Olympic medalists in water polo (men)
- List of men's Olympic water polo tournament goalkeepers
