= John Siman =

American water polo player (born 1952)

Personal information
- Full name: John O'Connell Siman
- Born: October 7, 1952 (age 73) Pasadena, California, U.S.
- Occupations: Water Polo, Swim Coach (Buena High School)
- Height: 198 cm (6 ft 6 in)
- Weight: 91 kg (201 lb)

Sport
- Sport: Water Polo
- Position: Forward; Likely Attacking Driver
- College team: Pasadena City College; Cal. State U. Fullerton
- Coached by: John Martin (Pasadena City); Monte Nitzkowski (84 Olympics)
Medal record
Men's water polo
Representing the United States
Olympic Games
Silver medal – second place	1984 Los Angeles	Men's water polo

John O'Connell Siman (born October 7, 1952, in Pasadena, California) is an American former water polo player who competed for California State University, Fullerton and participated in the 1984 Summer Olympics, winning a team silver medal in water polo. He coached water polo and swimming for over twenty years at Buena High School, and was inducted into the USA Water Polo Hall of Fame in 1989. In 1989, he was inducted into the USA Water Polo Hall of Fame.

Siman was born October 7, 1952, in Pasadena and attended Pasadena's John Muir High School, competing in swimming and water polo from 1969-1973, though much of his more competitive play may have been with club teams. In club play, he competed for the Industry Hill, and Fullerton Athletic Clubs from around 1977-1984.

== College ==
During his collegiate years, he attended Pasadena Community College for two years where he was a standout in Water Polo playing for Coach Nick Martin. The school is now known as Passadena City College. While at Pasadena City College in 1971, he was selected for both All-State and All-Metropolitan Conference honors. Playing in the forward position, for the 1971 Pasadena City College team, he was credited with a school record of 178 goals, with the team finishing fifth at the Southern California Championships. Siman completed his education at California State University Fullerton (CSUF), where he was an NCAA All American in Water Polo and may have received coaching from International Swimming Hall of Fame member Dr. Andrew Burke.

Siman qualified to play water polo for the 1980 U.S. Olympic team, but the U.S. did not participate in the 1980 Moscow Olympics due to a U.S. boycott.

== International competition highlights ==
In non-Olympic international competition, Siman played for the U.S. national team that captured a gold medal in Caracas, Venezuela, at the Pan American Games in 1983. He played with the U.S. National team at the World Championships in both 1978 and 1982.

== 1984 Los Angeles Olympic silver medal ==
Siman qualified for the 1984 U.S. Olympic team, and played in the 1984 Olympic Men's water polo team competition as the team's oldest member under former 1952 Olympian, and International Swimming Hall of Fame inductee, Olympic Head Coach Monte Nitzkowski. In the preliminary rounds of water polo at the 1984 Los Angeles Olympics, Yugoslavia and the United States won their initial three games. In the final round of play, Yugoslavia and the U.S. team played each other to decide the gold and silver medal winners. The U.S. team held a 5-2 lead late into the later part of quarter three, but failed to add more points, and Yugoslavia rebounded to tie the final match 5-5. With more overall goals, known as goal differential, Yugoslavia took the gold, the U.S. team the silver, West Germany the bronze, and Spain managed a finish in fourth place.

=== Honors ===
Siman became a member of the USA Water Polo Hall of Fame in 1989, and was made a member of the Pasadena City College Hall of Fame in 1971.

== Coaching ==
As early as 1991 and at least through 2016, Siman coached the varsity swim and water polo teams for Ventura, California's, Buena High School. He coached his son Scott, as a Senior on the Water Polo team in 2005.

== See also ==
- List of Olympic medalists in water polo (men)
