= Eric Borges =

Brazilian water polo player

Personal information
- Born: 3 September 1962 (age 64) São Paulo, Brazil

Sport
- Sport: Water polo
Medal record
Representing Brazil
Pan American Games
Silver medal – second place	1995 Mar del Plata	Men's tournament
Bronze medal – third place	1987 Indianapolis	Men's tournament
Bronze medal – third place	1991 La Habana	Men's tournament

Eric Borges (born 3 September 1962) is a Brazilian water polo player. He competed in the men's tournament at the 1984 Summer Olympics.
