= Márvio dos Santos =

Brazilian water polo player

Personal information
- Full name: Márvio Kelly dos Santos
- Born: 17 March 1934 Guanabara, Brazil
- Died: 26 February 1990 (aged 55)

Sport
- Country: Brazil
- Sport: Water polo
Medal record
Men's water polo
Representing Brazil
Pan American Games
Bronze medal – third place	1955 Mexico City	Team competition
Bronze medal – third place	1959 Chicago	Team competition
Gold medal – first place	1963 São Paulo	Team competition
South American Aquatics Championships
Gold medal – first place	1954 São Paulo	Team competition
Silver medal – second place	1956 Viña del Mar	Team competition
Gold medal – first place	1958 Montevideo	Team competition
Silver medal – second place	1960 Cali	Team competition
Gold medal – first place	1962 Buenos Aires	Team competition

Márvio Kelly dos Santos (Note: This name uses Portuguese naming customs: the first or maternal family name is Kelly and the second or paternal family name is dos Santos.) (17 March 1934 – 26 February 1990) was a Brazilian water polo player. He competed at the 1952 Summer Olympics, the 1960 Summer Olympics and the 1964 Summer Olympics.

== See also ==
- Brazil men's Olympic water polo team records and statistics
