= Water polo at the 1999 Pan American Games =

The Water Polo Tournament at the 1999 Pan American Games in Winnipeg, Manitoba, Canada, had a men's and a women's competition. The women were competing for the first time at the Pan American Games.

== Men's competition ==
=== Teams ===
GROUP A

- Argentina
- Brazil
- Canada
- Puerto Rico

GROUP B

- Colombia
- Cuba
- Mexico
- United States

=== Preliminary round ===
==== GROUP A ====
	Team	Points	G	W	D	L	GF	GA	Diff
1.	Canada	6	3	3	0	0	29	22	+7
2.	Brazil	4	3	2	0	1	22	16	+6
3.	Puerto Rico	2	3	1	0	2	22	30	–8
4.	Argentina	0	3	0	0	3	20	25	–5

- July 23, 1999

Canada	6 – 3	Brazil
Puerto Rico	8 – 5	Argentina

- July 24, 1999

Brazil	12 – 4	Puerto Rico
Canada	10 – 9	Argentina

- July 25, 1999

Brazil	7 – 6	Argentina
Canada	13 – 10	Puerto Rico

==== GROUP B ====
	Team	Points	G	W	D	L	GF	GA	Diff
1.	United States	6	3	3	0	0	44	6	+38
2.	Cuba	4	3	2	0	1	27	15	+12
3.	Colombia	2	3	1	0	2	18	36	–18
4.	Mexico	0	3	0	0	3	11	43	–32

- July 23, 1999

Colombia	0 – 18	United States
Cuba	11 – 3	Mexico

- July 24, 1999

Colombia	12 – 6	Mexico
Cuba	4 – 6	United States

- July 25, 1999

Mexico	2 – 20	United States
Cuba	12 – 6	Colombia

=== Semi Final Round ===
- July 27, 1999

Puerto Rico	6 – 4	Mexico
Colombia	9 – 7	Argentina

- July 28, 1999

Canada	5 – 8	Cuba
United States	7 – 3	Brazil

=== Final round ===
- July 29, 1999 — 7th place

Argentina	7 – 3	Mexico

- July 29, 1999 — 5th place

Colombia	9 – 7	Puerto Rico

- July 30, 1999 — Bronze-medal match

Canada	10 – 8	Brazil

- July 30, 1999 — Gold-medal match

United States	11 – 7	Cuba

=== Final ranking ===
RANK	TEAM
	United States
	Cuba
	Canada
4.	Brazil
5.	Colombia
6.	Puerto Rico
7.	Argentina
8.	Mexico

1999 Men's Pan American champions

United States
Eighth title

== Women's competition ==
=== Preliminary round ===
	Team	Points	G	W	D	L	GF	GA	Diff
1.	Canada	8	4	4	0	0	58	18	+40
2.	Brazil	6	4	3	0	1	41	23	+18
3.	United States	4	4	2	0	2	39	23	+16
4.	Cuba	2	4	1	0	3	18	34	–16
5.	Puerto Rico	0	4	0	0	4	5	63	–58

- July 23, 1999

Cuba	4 – 7	Brazil
Puerto Rico	2 – 16	United States

- July 24, 1999

Brazil	8 – 6	United States
Canada	15 – 4	Cuba

- July 25, 1999

Brazil	20 – 0	Puerto Rico
Canada	8 – 7	United States

- July 26, 1999

Canada	22 – 1	Puerto Rico
United States	10 – 5	Cuba

- July 27, 1999

Puerto Rico	2 – 5	Cuba
Canada	13 – 6	Brazil

=== Semi finals ===
- July 28, 1999

Canada	13 – 2	Cuba
United States	6 – 5 [aet]	Brazil

=== Bronze Medal ===
- July 30, 1999

Brazil	9 – 4	Cuba

=== Gold Medal ===
- July 30, 1999

Canada	8 – 6	United States

=== Final ranking ===
RANK	TEAM
	Canada
	United States
	Brazil
4.	Cuba
5.	Puerto Rico

1999 Women's Pan American champions

Canada
First title

=== Medal table ===
* Host nation (Canada)

Rank	Nation	Gold	Silver	Bronze	Total
1	United States	1	1	0	2
2	Canada	1	0	1	2
3	Cuba	0	1	0	1
4	Brazil	0	0	1	1
Totals (4 entries)		2	2	2	6
