= Ronald Crawford (water polo) =

American water polo player (1939–2015)

- A youthful Crawford at 21, in 1960

Personal information
- Full name: Ronald Emmerson Crawford
- Born: December 6, 1939 Brea, California, US
- Died: December 20, 2015 (aged 76) Manhattan Beach, California, US
- Occupations: High School Aquatics, WP Coach; Beverly Hills High School
- Height: 180 cm (5 ft 11 in)
- Weight: 73 kg (161 lb)
- Spouse: Lynn

Sport
- Sport: Water polo
- College team: Long Beach City College; Long Beach State
- Club: Phillips 66
- Coached by: Monte Nitzkowski(Long Beach City); N. Kohlhase, Urho Saari (Olympics)
Medal record
Representing United States
Pan American Games
| Gold medal – first place | 1959 Chicago | Men's tournament |
| Silver medal – second place | 1963 Sao Paulo | Men's tournament |

Ronald "Ron" Emerson Crawford (December 6, 1939 – December 20, 2015) was an American water polo player who competed for Long Beach State University and participated in the 1959 Pan American Games, the 1960 Summer Olympics, the 1964 Summer Olympics, and the 1968 Summer Olympics. In the 1960s, he was considered by many sports journalists to be the top American Water Polo Player. After his athletic career ended, he had a forty-year career as a Los Angeles area lifeguard, particularly during the summers, and taught Physical Education and coached swimming and water polo at Beverly Hills High School.

Crawford was born December 6, 1939 in Brea, California to George and Alice Crawford and attended Downey High School in the Los Angeles Suburb of Downey. He competed on Downey's strong swim team from around 1954-1956.

== College years ==
He attended and competed for the water polo programs at Long Beach City College from 1957 to 1958 under Monte Nitzkowski, a Water Polo Hall of Fame inductee, and US Olympic Coach. He completed his education at Long Beach State from 1961 to 1963. At Long Beach State, he played on Water Polo teams that placed first in championships and in both 1962 and 1963, he received All-American honors in water polo.

In non-Olympic international competition, Crawford was a member of the American water polo team which took the silver medal in the 1963 Pan American games in São Paulo and a gold medal at the 1959 Pan American games. He coached the U.S. water polo team to a silver medal at the Maccabiah Games in Israel.

== Olympics ==
=== 1960 Rome Olympics ===
Crawford participated with the U.S. team that finished seventh among sixteen competing countries at the 1960 Summer Olympics in Rome in the Men's water polo tournament. He played six matches and scored five goals. The US polo team played under Olympic Coaches Neal Kohlhase and Urho Saari, both inductees of the USA Water Polo Hall of Fame. Though the U.S. had a disappointing 7–2 loss to pre-Olympic favorite Hungary in early rounds, the U.S. team defeated the team from France with a score of 10-4. Helping to advance the team to the semi-finals, the U.S. defeated the strong team from Belgium in a quarterfinal round in a 5–0 shutout. Though making it to the semi-finals, they lost a late round match to the traditionally dominant team from Yugoslavia, 6–2 on August 31, ending their chances of contending for a medal. At the completion of the tournament, the team from Italy won the gold, Russia took the silver, and perennial favorite Hungary took the bronze.

=== 1964 Tokyo Olympics ===
Four years later, he participated with the U.S. team under Olympic Head Coach Urho Saari that was eliminated in the first round of the 1964 Olympic tournament in Tokyo, finishing in ninth place overall among thirteen competing countries. Crawford played three matches and scored four goals. Members of the team included the brothers Paul, Ned and Chick McIlroy, Ralph Whitney, and Urho Saari's son Bob Saari. In their first game, the Americans lost to a strong, tall and dominant team from Yugoslavia 2-1, where water polo was a major sport. The U.S. team was tied 1–1 with the team from Yugoslavia throughout the first half, with the Yugoslavians not taking the winning shot until the last four minutes of play in the second half. In their next game, the American team defeated the team from Brazil 7-1, but were subsequently defeated 4–6 by the team from the Netherlands, losing their chance to advance to the semi-finals. In an unusual twist, in the losing game against the Netherlands American goalie Tony Van Dorp, played against his brother Fred van Dorp. Tony Van Dorp had played for the Dutch Team before coming to America and gaining citizenship in 1957. After semi-final play, pre-games and perennial favorite Hungary took the gold medal, Yugoslavia took the silver, and the Soviet Union took the bronze.

=== 1968 Mexico City Olympics ===
Crawford competed at the 1968 Olympic water polo tournament under Head Olympic water polo coach Art Lambert. The U.S. team finished fifth overall among the fifteen countries competing. Crawford played all eight matches but did not score a goal. The 1968 Olympics were similar to the previous four Olympics in that the dominant teams from Hungary, Yugoslavia, the Soviet Union, and Italy made the semi-finals. In the end, Yugoslavia won the gold, the Soviet Union the silver, and Hungary took the bronze.

== Careers ==
In 1962, Crawford served as a Lifeguard for Los Angeles County, a career he remained for over 40 years. He was a director of Los Angeles's Lifeguard Program for Junior members, and the annual Surf Festival.

From 1964 through 1965, Crawford served actively with the U.S. Army, continuing to train and compete with the U.S. National team through 1970.

=== Coaching ===
In 1966-2000 he was a Physical Education teacher and a swim and water polo coach at Beverly Hills High School.

=== Honors ===
In 1977, Ronald Crawford was inducted into the USA Water Polo Hall of Fame. In 1986, he became a member of the Long Beach State Hall of Fame. In 1983 he became the first American water polo player to be inducted into the international water polo Hall of Fame.

== Death ==
Crawford, who lived in Manhattan Beach just over 50 years, died on December 20, 2015. Memorial services were planned to be held at the Manhattan Beach waterfront on January 31, 2016, with a memorial reception at the Manhattan Beach Mariott at mid-day January 31. Crawford was survived by his wife Lynn, two children and three step-children.
