= John Parker (water polo) =

American water polo player (born 1946)

Personal information
- Born: September 13, 1946 (age 79) Long Beach, California, U.S.

Sport
- Sport: Water Polo
- College team: Foothill Jr. College; Stanford University
- Club: DeAnza Aquatic Foundation; Foothills Athletic Club
- Coached by: Nort Thornton (Foothill College); James Gaughran (Stanford); Art Lambert (68 Olympics); Monte Nitzkowski (72 Olympics)
Medal record
Men's water polo
Representing the United States
Olympic Games
Bronze medal – third place	1972 Munich	Team competition

John Michael Parker (born September 13, 1946) is an American retired water polo player, who competed in two consecutive Summer Olympics for his native country, starting at the 1968 Mexico City Olympics. He won the bronze medal with the Men's National Team at the 1972 Summer Olympics in Munich, West Germany.

Parker was born September 13, 1946 in Long Beach California. Graduating in June, 1964, he attended Los Altos High School, where he participated in water polo from 1961-64, and won All American honors in 1962, and 1963, as well as All-Santa Clara Valley Athletic League (SCVAL) honors in 1964.

== Collegiate years ==
Stanford Coach Gaughran

Parker attended Foothill Junior college where he played water polo from around 1964-1965, for Coach Nort Thornton.

He transferred to Stanford University where as an upperclassman, he swam and played water polo for coaches that included James Gaughran, receiving NCAA All American Honors for his collegiate career at Stanford in 65, 66, and 67. In 1967, the Stanford team finished their season with a record of 15-4, and were the second highest rated team behind the University of California Los Angeles, ahead of both third place University of California and fourth place San Jose State. One of Parker's team mates at Stanford was fellow Olympian Gary Sheerer. Parker later received an MBA from Harvard Business School.

In club play, Parker played for DeAnza Aquatic Foundation and Foothills Athletic Clubs.

Parker served an officer in the United States Navy, where he was in active duty in Viet Nam from 1969-1971.

== Olympics ==
At the 1968 Mexico City Olympics, Parker played with the U.S. water polo team that placed fifth under Head Coach Art Lambert and Assistant Coach Monte Nitzkowski. Facing stiff competition in early rounds, the 1968 U.S. water polo team beat the team from Brazil by a score of 10-5, later reaching a 6-6 tie with Cuba, though they outshot the Cuban team 19-0. In later rounds, the American team lost to pre-game favorites Hungary and the Soviet Union, but beat the East German team by a score of 6-4 in their final rounds to receive their fifth place finish. All pre-Olympic favorites, Yugoslavia took the team gold medal, with the Soviet Union taking the silver, and Hungary taking the bronze.

=== 1972 Munich Olympic bronze medal ===
Parker won the team bronze medal at the August, 1972 Summer Olympics in Munich in the Men's Water Polo Team competition where he was managed by Head U.S. water polo coach Monte Nitzkowski. In the U.S. water polo team's second game at the 1972 Munich Olympics, the team defeated Cuba 7–6 on August 28, 1972 and then defeated Canada on August 29. On August 30, the U.S. team defeated Mexico, 7–5. They defeated Yugoslavia 5–3 on August 31, and tied with West Germany 4–4 on September 1. In a disappointing loss, the U.S. team went 5–3 to Hungary on September 2. In a closely followed game, the US Team tied with the future Gold medal winner, the Soviet Union, 6–6 on September 3. The U.S. team took the bronze medal, the team from the Soviet Union took the gold medal and Hungary took the silver.

In career pursuits, Parker worked for the Clarion Group Management Consulting firm in Seattle, Washington.

=== Honors ===
In 1982, he was inducted into the USA Water Polo Hall of Fame.

== See also ==
- List of Olympic medalists in water polo (men)
