= Jesse Smith (water polo) =

American water polo player

Personal information
- Born: April 27, 1983 (age 43) Kailua, Hawaii, U.S.
- Height: 6 ft 4 in (1.93 m)

Sport
- Country: United States
- Sport: Water polo
- Position: Utility player
- College team: Pepperdine University
- Coached by: Terry Schroeder (Pepperdine, 2008-12 Olympics)
Medal record
Men's water polo
Representing the United States
Olympic Games
Silver medal – second place	2008 Beijing	Team
FINA World League
Silver medal – second place	2016 Huizhou	Team
Pan American Games
Gold medal – first place	2007 Rio	Team
Gold medal – first place	2011 Guadalajara	Team
Gold medal – first place	2015 Toronto	Team
Gold medal – first place	2019 Lima	Team

Jesse Smith (born April 27, 1983) is an American professional water polo utility player. He was an All-American at Pepperdine University. Smith is a 2008 Olympic silver medalist and a five-time Olympian with participation in 2004, 2008, 2012, 2016, and 2020. He has played professional water polo for Panathinaikos in Greece.

== Early life ==
Smith was born April 27, 1983 in Kailua, Hawaii, but grew up primarily in greater San Diego, California. He played water polo for Coronado High School, where he helped the team win three San Diego Section CIF Division II titles from 1998 to 2000. He was named the San Diego Union Tribune Player of the Year in 1999 and 2000.

== Pepperdine University ==
Smith then played for Pepperdine University. As a utility player, Smith could hold any field position including wing, driver, and hole set, known as Center. The position allowed Smith to use his speed and agility to make shots from many angles and set-up other players to make goals. Smith was named to the All-American first team in 2002 and 2004. He led Pepperdine in scoring in 2002, had 55 goals in 2003, and in 2005 had a season total of 51 goals. During his time with Pepperdine, the Water Polo team had an overall record of 67-35, a .657 winning percentage. A national title team during Smith's tenure, the University captured the 2002 Mountain Pacific Sports Federation (MPSF) regular-season title. Pepperdine had U.S. national Collegiate rankings of fifth, third, fifth and sixth during Smith's tenure with the team. He graduated Pepperdine in 2005 with an economics degree.

== International career highlights ==
At the 2003 Pan American Games, Smith scored in three games and helped the U.S. win the tournament. At the 2004 Summer Olympics, he scored nine goals. The U.S. finished seventh. Smith scored six goals in the 2005 FINA World Championships, but the U.S. finished in 11th place.

Smith, who scored eight goals, was a member of the team that won a gold medal at the 2007 Pan American Games. He was also a member of the teams that finished fifth in both the 2006 and 2007 FINA World League Super Finals.

In 2009, Smith played on the U.S. fourth-place teams at the World Super League Final and World Championships. The U.S. also finished fourth in the 2010 FINA World Cup. In the 2011 Pan American Games, Smith scored six goals, as the U.S. won the gold medal in that tournament again.

== 2004-2020 Olympics ==
Coached by Ratko Rudić, with Smith's participation, the U.S. mens's water polo team finished seventh at the 2004 Olympics in Athens. An important contributor in Athens, Smith scored nine goals though he was the team’s youngest player. Coached by his Pepperdine Coach Terry Schroeder, the U.S. Olympic men's water polo team was eighth at the 2012 Olympics in London, and tenth in the 2016 Olympics in Rio de Janeiro. At the 2020 Olympics in Tokyo, Smith was a part of the U.S. team that placed sixth in an improved finish. At the 2016 and 2020 Olympics, Smith was coached by U.S. Head Olympic Coach Dejan Udovičić.

=== 2008 Beijing Olympic silver medal ===
In a career highpoint at the 2008 Summer Olympics, where he was coached by his former Pepperdine Coach Terry Schroder, Smith scored three goals and helped win a silver medal for the U.S.

=== Professional ===
He has played professionally for Greece's Ethnikos Piraeus, Olympiacos Piraeus, Egypt's Gezira, Turkey's Galatasaray, Italy's Savona and Montenegro's Jadran Herceg Novi.

== Personal ==
Smith was born in Kailua, Hawaii, on April 27, 1983. He lives in Thousand Oaks, California. He is 6 feet, 4 inches tall.

Smith is married and has two sons, Brooks and Samuel. From an athletic family of water polo enthusiasts, Smith's father played water polo at Coronado High School, and his brother played water polo for Stanford.

== See also ==
- List of Olympic medalists in water polo (men)
- List of players who have appeared in multiple men's Olympic water polo tournaments
