= Water polo at the 1959 Pan American Games =

Water polo at the I959 Pan American Games

Water polo was contested for men only at the 1959 Pan American Games in Chicago, United States. It was played at the Portage Park pool.

== Competing teams ==
Five teams contested the event.

- Argentina
- Brazil
- Mexico
- United States
- British West Indies

== Medalists ==
Event	Gold	Silver	Bronze
Men's water polo	United States (USA); Arthur Koblish; Ronald Crawford other Illinois Athletic Club players.	Argentina (ARG)	Brazil (BRA); Adhemar Grijó Filho; Everardo Filho; Flávio Ratto; Hilton de Almeida; João Gonçalves Filho; Luiz Daniel; Márvio dos Santos; Paulo Cochrane; Rodney Bell; Sylvio dos Santos
