= Steven Barnett (water polo) =

American water polo player (born 1943)

Personal information
- Full name: Steven William Barnett
- Born: June 6, 1943 (age 83) Los Angeles, California
- Occupation(s): High School Teacher; Swim, Water Polo Coach
- Height: 191 cm (6 ft 3 in)
- Weight: 86 kg (190 lb)

Sport
- Sport: Water Polo
- Position: goalkeeper
- College team: Foothill College; Long Beach State
- Club: De Anza Athletic Foundation; Foothill Water Polo Club
- Coached by: Jim Shultz (Long Beach State); Monte Nitzkowski (72 Olympics)
Medal record
Men's water polo
Representing the United States
Olympic Games
Bronze medal – third place	1972 Munich	Team competition

Steven William Barnett (born June 6, 1943) is a retired water polo player from the United States, who competed for California State University Long Beach and participated in two consecutive Summer Olympics for his native country, with his first Olympics at Mexico City in 1968 where the U.S. Water Polo team placed fifth. Playing goalkeeper, Barnett helped the U.S. Team win their first U.S. bronze medal in the Men's Water Polo Team Competition since 1932 with the Men's National Team at the 1972 Summer Olympics in Munich, West Germany. He would later teach High School and coach water polo at Lynbrook High School in San Jose.

Barnett was born June 6, 1943, and attended Camden High School in San Jose, California where he was on the swimming team from 1957-1960 and was coached by Al Worrell, but did not play water polo for the school, as they did not have a team.

== College ==
Barnett played college water polo for Foothill Junior College from 1961-1963 where in the 1962 season, he had the team's best shooting percentage with 14 of 32 goals for a .430 average. He later attended California State University at Long Beach, then known as Long Beach State from 1963-1965 where he played for Jim Shultz. Barnett was All-State at Long Beach, and helped the water polo team to a season record of 31-8 during his playing tenure. Barnett played club water polo as a goalkeeper for the DeAnza Athletic Foundation and the Foothills Water Polo Club.

== 1968-1972 Olympics ==
Barnett participated as a goalkeeper in the 1968 Mexico City Olympics where the United States finished in fifth place.

Again playing as a goalkeeper, Barnett participated at the 1972 Munich Olympics in the Water polo team competition under Head Coach Monte Nitzkowski and had outstanding play where the U.S. team captured the bronze medal, their first water polo medal since the 1932 Olympics. At the 1972 Olympics, the Hungarian water polo team, a clear favorite, had won three of the last four Olympic gold medals, though Yugoslavia, the Soviet Union and Italy were also early pre-game favorites. Barnett was one of the more experience players, as was Bill Bradley who had also played in the 1968 Olympics. In early Olympic competition, the U.S. team defeated Cuba 7-6, eased by Romania with a score of 4-3, and then defeated Canada. The U.S. team ended their match with East Germany with a 4-4 tie, and lost to Hungary 5-3. In the finals, the American water polo team tied 6-6 with the Russian team who took the gold medal with Hungary taking the silver.

== Coaching ==
Barnett coached swimming and water polo at Lynbrook High School in San Jose beginning in 1968, and continuing through at least 1987.

=== Honors ===
In 1982, he was inducted into the USA Water Polo Hall of Fame. He became a member of the Long Beach State Hall of Fame in 1992. As a water polo player, he won the James W. Lee Award.

== See also ==
- List of Olympic medalists in water polo (men)
- List of men's Olympic water polo tournament goalkeepers
