= Water polo at the 1987 Pan American Games =

Water polo was contested for men only at the 1987 Pan American Games in Indianapolis, United States.

== Competing teams ==
Six teams contested the event.

- Brazil
- Canada
- Cuba
- Mexico
- Puerto Rico
- United States

== Medalists ==
Event	Gold	Silver	Bronze
Men's water polo	United States	Cuba	Brazil; Ayrton P. C. Silva; Eduardo Comini; Eric Borges; Fernando Rocha Filho; Fernando Carsalade; Francisco Chaves Neto; Gilberto Gargiulo; Gilberto Guimarães; Hélio Filho; João Meireles; Mário E. A. Souto; Sérgio S. Figueiredo Jr. Sílvio Manfredi
