= Water polo at the 1971 Pan American Games =

Water polo was contested for men only at the 1971 Pan American Games in Cali, Colombia.

== Competing teams ==
Six teams contested the event.

- Argentina
- Brazil
- Canada
- Cuba
- Mexico
- United States

== Medalists ==
Event	Gold	Silver	Bronze
Men's water polo	United States	Cuba	Mexico
