= Bruce Bradley (water polo) =

American water polo player (born 1947)

Personal information
- Full name: Myron Bruce Bradley
- Born: January 15, 1947 (age 79) Los Angeles, California, U.S.
- Occupation(s): Coaching, Real Estate Broker

Sport
- Sport: Water Polo
- Position: Driver
- College team: University of California at Los Angeles
- Club: Phillips 66 Water Polo Club
- Coached by: Bob Horn, (UCLA); Monte Nitzkowski (Phillips, Olympics)
Medal record
Men's water polo
Representing the United States
Olympic Games
Bronze medal – third place	1972 Munich	Team competition

Myron Bruce Bradley (born January 15, 1947), known as Bruce Bradley, is a retired water polo player from the United States, who competed in water polo for UCLA, and participated in two consecutive Summer Olympics for his native country, beginning with the 1968 Mexico City Olympics and later the 1972 Summer Olympics in Munich where he won a bronze team medal in the U.S. Men's water polo team competition. Bradley, an outstanding contributor to the U.S. Olympic team, was the high scorer for the U.S. team in the 1968 Olympics, and with 17 points was the second highest scorer of all the water polo competitors at the 1972 Olympics, second only to the Cuban team's Carlos Sanchez who scored a total of 18..

Bradley was born January 15, 1947 in Los Angeles and attended Millikan High School where he competed in both swimming and Water Polo from 1960-63. In club play, Bradley competed with the Phillips 66 Water Polo Club from 1967-76 subsequent to his High School playing career where he one of his coaches was Monte Nitzkowski. Millikan won its division in the Moore League Swimming Invitational on March 22, 1963, with Bradley swimming on the winning 200 medley relay team, that set a time of 1:49.7.

== University of California Los Angeles ==
Bradley attended the University of California at Los Angeles, where he was trained and managed by Head Coach Bob Horn. He played with UCLA's water polo team from 1964-68, graduating in 1968 with a degree in psychology, and later studied for a Master' s Degree at the University. Bradley likely played in the position of driver during his water polo career as a speedy and high scoring player. During his collegiate era, in American Athletic Union sanctioned competition, he was an outdoor All American in water polo in 1968, 1970, 1972, and 1976.

Bradley was commissioned as a Naval officer and served as a Lieutenant at the Long Beach Naval Station and in Viet Nam in 1971, though he was able to intermittently continue playing with the U.S. National Water Polo team during his service.

== 1968-1972 Olympics ==
Bradley participated in the 1968 Mexico City Olympics under Head Coach Art Lambert. The team trained in Colorado Springs to adjust to the higher altitude in Mexico City, and later placed fifth in Olympic competition at the 1968 Olympics. Bradley was the highest point scorer for the U.S. 1968 U.S. Olympic team.

=== 1972 Olympic bronze medal ===
At the 1972 Munich Olympics, Bradley and the U.S. team were coached by Water Polo Hall of Famer and Long Beach State Coach Monte Nitzkowski. The Hungarian team, a clear favorite, had won three of the last four Olympic gold medals, though Yugoslavia, the Soviet Union and Italy were also early pre-game favorites. The 1972 U.S. team with Bradley's participation placed third in the U.S. Men's water polo team competition for the bronze medal, America's fourth bronze in water polo, but its first medal since 1932. Bradley was one of the most experienced players on the U.S. team, and scored a total of 17 points in Olympic play in 1972, second only to Cuban player Carlos Sanchez who scored 18. In early Olympic competition, Bradley scored three goals in the U.S. team's 7-6 win against Cuba, and two goals in the U.S. team's 4-3 victory over Romania. In the U.S. team's easy victory over Canada, Bradley scored two additional goals. The U.S. team ended their match with East Germany with a 4-4 tie, and lost to Hungary 5-3, a series of events which Bradly later attributed partly to somewhat biased European referees. He was particularly disappointed with the American water polo teams tie with the Russian team who took the gold medal with Hungary taking the silver.

Bradley served as a Water Polo coach and referee for a ten year period and worked as a real estate broker in the Long Beach area.

=== Honors ===
In 1984, he was inducted into the USA Water Polo Hall of Fame. Bradley played with the United States Water Polo National Team for eight years, from 1966-78 and was part of the All World Team in 1972. During his collegiate career, he was an All-PAC 8 honoree in selection 1965, 66, and 67.

== See also ==
- List of Olympic medalists in water polo (men)
- List of men's Olympic water polo tournament top goalscorers
