= Water polo at the 1983 Pan American Games =

Water polo was contested for men only at the 1983 Pan American Games in Caracas, Venezuela.

== Competing teams ==
Eight teams contested the event.

- Brazil
- Canada
- Colombia
- Cuba
- Mexico
- Puerto Rico
- United States
- Venezuela

== Medalists ==
Event	Gold	Silver	Bronze
Men's water polo	United States	Cuba	Canada
