= Stanley Cole (water polo) =

American water polo player (1945–2018)

- A youthful Cole with his signature broad smile

Personal information
- Born: October 12, 1945 Dover, Delaware, United States
- Died: July 26, 2018 (aged 72) Encinitas, California, United States
- Occupations: Executive, Construction Industry
- Spouses: Annette Wiley; Mary A. Walsh
- Children: 3

Sport
- Sport: Water Polo
- Position: Attacking Driver (likely)
- College team: University of California Los Angeles
- Club: Phillips 66
- Coached by: Bob Horn (UCLA)
Medal record
Men's water polo
Representing the United States
Olympic Games
Bronze medal – third place	1972 Munich	Team competition

Stanley Clark Cole (October 12, 1945 – July 26, 2018) was a water polo player from the United States, who competed for the University of California Los Angeles and participated in three consecutive Summer Olympics for his native country, starting in 1964. He won the bronze medal with the Men's National Team at the 1972 Summer Olympics in Munich, West Germany. In 1984, he was inducted into the USA Water Polo Hall of Fame. After college, and Naval service, he served as an Executive in the construction industry.

== Early life ==
Stanley Cole was born October 12, 1945 in Dover, Delaware, to Eugene and Irma Cole. His father was with the U.S. Army Air Corps, and his family moved with greater frequency than most. After an earlier move, the family settled in Whittier, California around 1948. Starting to swim competitively by the age of eight, Cole was teaching swimming and competing in water polo in Whittier by the age of twelve. Cole attended Whittier High School from around 1959-1963, where in his Freshman year, his "C" team went undefeated, winning the California Interscholastic Federation (CIF) championship. Helping to refocus high school sports priorities, in his Senior year at Whittier he was named the Athlete of the Year, the first time the award had been given to an athlete outside of football.

== University of California Los Angeles ==
Cole attended the University of California Los Angeles on a water polo and swimming scholarship, where he was voted an All-American three times, and was a key contributor to UCLA's 1965-7 undefeated water polo teams. Making an immediate impact, he helped lead the Bruin freshman in scoring in 1963 with 53 goals scored in 10 games, and later held a three-season goal scoring record of 165. In his collegiate career, he was trained and mentored by Water Polo Hall of Fame and UCLA's inaugural water polo coach, Bob Horn. As a multi-sport athlete, Cole was a member of UCLA's swim team for four years, where he was a 1965 PAC-10 champion in the 100-yard butterfly.

=== Naval service ===
While at UCLA, Cole completed coursework for the Reserved Officer's Training Corps ROTC. After graduation from UCLA, and attending the 1968 Olympics, Cole became an officer in the U.S. Navy, where he would complete tours of Viet Nam, the Philippines, Hong Kong, and Japan. After transferring from the USS Terrell County, a tank-landing ship, he served on the USS Iwo Jima (LPH-2) which stopped at Okinowa, Singapore and Hawaii. During his service on April 17, 1970, the Iwo Jima recovered the well-known astronauts and the capsule from the ill-fated Apollo 13 which re-entered earth's atmosphere and splashed-down safely despite suffering from a badly damaged service module. He left the Navy as a Lieutenant to concentrate on training for the 1972 Munich Olympics.

== Olympics ==
Cole was on the U.S. Olympic Men's water polo team at the 1964 Tokyo Olympics, the 1968 Mexico City Olympics, and the 1972 Munich Olympics. At the 1972 Munich Olympics, he scored six goals in Olympic play, helping lead the U.S. team to a bronze medal.

Cole married Mary A. Walsh, a Dentist, around 1982.

After his athletic and Naval careers, Cole worked in the construction industry for over four decades. He was a project manager for Ernest W. Hahn, and was an executive in charge of construction for Newport Beach's Carver Development. He later started his own company, Cole Development that primarily built custom homes in San Diego County.

Cole died at his home in Encinata, California of cholangiocarcinoma, a cancer of the bile ducts, at the age of 72 on July 26, 2018. Memorial services were held at the Christ Presbyternian Church of La Costa, California in Carlsbad at mid-day on August 26. He was survived by his wife Mary Walsh, two daughters, a son and three grandchildren.

=== Honors ===
Recognized for his contributions to Collegiate, National, and International teams, in 1984 Cole became a member of the USA Water Polo Hall of Fame, a member of the International Water Polo Hall of Fame in 1986, and was the inaugural player accepted to the UCLA Hall of Fame in 1990. As an honor from his High School alma mater in 2015, he was voted a member of the Whittier High School Hall of Fame.

== See also ==
- List of Olympic medalists in water polo (men)
