= Water polo at the 1975 Pan American Games =

Water polo was contested for men only at the 1975 Pan American Games in Mexico City, Mexico.

== Competing teams ==
Five teams contested the event.

- Canada
- Cuba
- Mexico
- Puerto Rico
- United States

== Medalists ==
Event	Gold	Silver	Bronze
Men's water polo	Mexico	United States	Cuba
