= Peter Asch =

American water polo player (born 1948)

Personal information
- Born: January 25, 1947 (age 79) Monterey, California
- Education: U Cal Berkeley
- Occupations: Banking executive Water Polo Coach
- Height: 188 cm (6 ft 2 in)
- Weight: 82 kg (181 lb)
- Spouse: Esther

Sport
- College team: University of California Berkeley
- Club: Santa Clara Swim Club; De Anza Aquatic Foundation; Concord Swim Club
- Coached by: George Haines (Santa Clara); Peter J. Cutino (Berkeley); Monte Nitzkowski ('72 Olympics)
Medal record
Men's water polo
Representing the United States
Olympic Games
Bronze medal – third place	1972 Munich	Team competition

Peter Gregory Asch "Pasch" (born October 16, 1948) is a retired American water polo player from the United States, who won the bronze medal with the Men's National Team at the 1972 Summer Olympics in Munich, West Germany. He received a gold medal in 1971 and a silver medal in 1975 with the American Water Polo Team in the PanAm Games, and was rated as one of the best players in the World from 1971 to 1976. He graduated from the University of California Berkeley in 1971 where he competed in Water Polo, and later worked in banking, and as a water polo coach.

Asch is Jewish, and attended Santa Clara High School. He was a member of the Santa Clara Swim Club, founded by George Haines, an exceptional California swim coach who was an Olympic Coach and coached Mark Spitz who also attended Santa Clara High, and Don Schollander. During Asch's High School Years, Santa Clara Swim Club was located at Santa Clara High School and had a Water Polo Team. Asch was a High School era All-American Water Polo Player twice while swimming for championship Teams with the DeAnza Aquatic Club.

== University of California Berkeley ==
During his college career at UC Berkeley where he was managed by Hall of Fame Coach Peter J. Cutino, Asch served as water polo team captain from 1968 to 1969, earned All-America honors in water polo for the Bears three straight years from 1967 to 1969, and helped lead his team to a second place finish in the first NCAA men's water polo team championship. Asch was voted Most Valuable Player for U.C. Berkeley, in the 1968–69 season, and was Captain of U.C. Berkeley's Water Polo Team in 1969. He served as chapter president for Sigma Alpha Epsilon fraternity, with 72 Olympic teammate and UC Berkeley teammate Barry Weitzenberg as a member.

Asch was on American Athletic Union National Outdoor Championship Teams in 1969, 70, and 73, and from 1974 to 1976. He represented the De Anza Aquatic & Concord Swim Clubs.

In June 1972, Asch was selected to participate in a Tour of Europe by the Olympic Committee from June 17-July 2, after which he began Olympic training. The American Team was head coached by Monte Nitzkowski, who would coach Water Polo in four Olympic years.

== 1972 Olympic medal ==
Asch qualified for the U.S. team at the 1972 Olympics, and competed in Munich under Head Olympic Coach Monte Nitzkowski, and Assistant Coach Artie Lambert.

In his 1972 Division A preliminary Olympic Game against Romania, on August 27, in Munich at the Olympia Schwimmhalle, Asch scored the deciding goal in a 4–3 victory with only 1:52 left to play.

In the subsequent games at the 1972 Munich Olympics, the United States water polo Team defeated Cuba 7–6 on August 28 where Asch scored a goal, and then defeated Canada on August 29. On August 30, the team defeated Mexico, 7–5. They defeated Yugoslavia 5–3 on August 31, and tied with West Germany 4–4 on September 1. On September 1, in the difficult 4–4 tie in the opening final game with the strongly supported home team West Germany, Asch scored a vital goal. But in a rare loss, the U.S. team went 5–3 to Hungary on September 2. In a closely followed game, and an important one for Asch, the US Team tied with the future Gold medal winner, the Soviet Union, 6–6 on September 3, and Asch scored a needed goal against a team many American fans viewed as a major rival. The American Team was greatly disappointed with the tie, and Asch later inferred that his decision to continue playing Water Polo with the National Team was in hopes of someday beating Russia. Asch got his chance to play Russia again in Long Beach in a series of games in February 1973 and scored at least one goal, but the Russians, swept the three-game series which ended on February 18. In their Final 1972 Olympic game, the US Team defeated Italy 6–5 on September 4. Russia took the gold medal, and a highly skilled team from Hungary, who had defeated the United States, the silver.

=== PanAm Games medals ===
After his bronze medal at the München Olympics, he won a gold in the 1971 PanAm Games and a silver at the 1975 PanAm Games.

=== Honors ===
Asch became a member of the University of California Athletic Hall of Fame in 1969. He became a member of the USA Water Polo Hall of Fame in 1984. In 1975, Asch was winner of the James W. Lee Award for his work with the Outdoor Nationals Team and was Captain of the US National Team from 1973 to 1976. He was a member of the All-World Team in 1973 and 1975.

== Careers ==
After graduating from Berkeley in 1971, he joined the Bank of America Corp. and by 1975 was an Assistant Investments Officer. He later became president of one of the Bank of America Corp. group subsidiaries. His wife Marsha was a synchronized swimmer with whom he would occasionally train. Asch has most recently lived in California. In 1984, he was inducted into the USA Water Polo Hall of Fame.

=== Coaching ===
In addition to his successful business career, Asch made a return to the water polo community as a coach for girls' age-group teams. From 1995-1997, he coached age-group girls' teams including the Corcord Golden Bears, and served as the head coach at Miramonte High School, where his teams won North Coast Section titles. Beginning as an Assistant coach in 1998, he has served as a women's and men's Head coach for the University of California Berkeley water polo teams. Asch has lived in Orinda, California with his wife Esther and their daughter.

== See also ==
- List of Olympic medalists in water polo (men)
- List of select Jewish water polo players
