= Water polo at the 1979 Pan American Games =

Water polo was contested for men only at the 1979 Pan American Games in San Juan, Puerto Rico, Puerto Rico.

== Competing teams ==
Six teams contested the event.

- Brazil
- Canada
- Cuba
- Mexico
- Puerto Rico
- United States

== Medalists ==
Event	Gold	Silver	Bronze
Men's water polo	United States	Cuba	Canada
