= Gary Sheerer =

American water polo player (born 1947)

Personal information
- Born: February 18, 1947 (age 79) Berkeley, California, U.S.
- Height: 175 cm (5 ft 9 in)
- Weight: 73 kg (161 lb)
- Spouse: Ann Peterson Sheerer (m. circa 1970)

Sport
- Sport: (Swimming), Water Polo
- Position: Freestyle Swimmer; Driver (Water Polo)
- College team: Stanford University
- Club: DeAnza Aquatic Foundation (after '65); Foothills Athletic Club
- Coached by: James Gaughran (Stanford); Art Lambert (DeAnza AC, Olympics); Monte Nitzkowski (72 Olympics)
Medal record
Representing the United States
Olympic Games
Bronze medal – third place	1972 Munich	Team competition
Pan American Games
Gold medal – first place	1967 Winnipeg	Team competition

Gary Peter Sheerer (born February 18, 1947) is a retired water polo player from the United States, who competed for Stanford University, and participated in two consecutive Summer Olympics in water polo for his native country, at the 1968 and 1972 Olympics. Sheerer was part of the U.S. Water Polo team that captured the team bronze medal at the 1972 Munich Olympics.

Sheerer was born February 18, 1947 in Berkeley, California to Mr. and Mrs. Cedric Sheerer. Growing up in the greater San Francisco Bay area in the central, coastal region of California, Sheerer attended Los Altos High School and graduated Chester Awalt High School in June, 1964, later renamed Mountain View High School. During his High School years, he competed in swimming and water polo from 1960-1964, where he earned All American honors in swimming from 1963-1964, and was a Most Valuable Player in the Northern California Water Polo Championships during the same years. His All American honors in swimming were in the 200 and 400-yard freestyle events. He was a two-year All-league player in Water Polo, and played on Awalt's Santa Clara Valley Athletic League championship water polo team in 1963.

== Stanford University ==
Coach Gaughran '60

Sheerer attended Stanford University on a scholarship, competing in swimming and playing for their water polo team from 1964-68 where he was managed by Stanford Hall of Fame Head swimming and water polo coach James Gaughran. While at Stanford, he was a member of Beta Theta Phi fraternity. An accomplished high school and collegiate swimmer in addition to his skills in water polo, Sheerer held the NCAA 200 freestyle record as a Stanford Freshman in 1965. Recognized for his early talent in the sport, he served as Captain of Stanford's Freshman Water Polo team and of their varsity team in 1967. He graduated from Stanford in 1969 with a degree in Engineering.

In club play from 1965-1973, Sheerer competed in Water Polo for the DeAnza Athletic Foundation and later the Foothills Athletic Club, subsequent to his High School swimming and water polo career.

== Competition highlights ==
In collegiate and post-collegiate athletic honors, he was an AAU Outdoor National Championship Most Valuable Player in 1966 and 1970, and captured the James W. Lee Award. He was an AAU National Championship Most Valuable Player for indoors in 1971 and won the John J. Curren Award. Primarily during his college years, he was an AAU All American for outdoor competition successively for the years 1966-70, and an AAU Indoor All American in 1971.

In international competition, Sheerer won a gold medal playing with the U.S. National team at the 1967 Pan American Games in Winnipeg, Canada.

== 1968-72 Olympics ==
Sheerer was a part of the U.S. Water Polo team at the 1968 Mexico City Olympics, with the U.S. team placing fifth overall. Facing stiff competition in early rounds, the U.S. beat the team from Brazil by a score of 10-5, later reaching a 6-6 tie with Cuba, though they outshot the Cuban team 19-0. In later rounds, the American team lost to pre-game favorites Hungary and the Soviet Union, but beat the East German team by a score of 6-4 in their final rounds to receive their fifth place finish. All pre-Olympic favorites, Yugoslavia took the team gold medal, with the Soviet Union taking the silver, and Hungary taking the bronze.

=== Bronze medal ===
Acting as a Team Captain, Sheerer won the bronze medal in the late August, early September 1972 Munich Olympic Water Polo team competition playing with the Men's National Team at the Schwimmhalle, in Olympiapark, in Munich, Germany. In 1972, Sheerer and the U.S. water polo team were managed by Hall of Fame Head Coach Monte Nitzkowski, a former competitor for Long Beach City College, and assisted by Art Lambert, who had coached water polo at the DeAnza Athletic Club. The early Water Polo favorites in 1972 were the teams from Hungary, Yugoslavia, and the Soviet Union. Exceeding expectations, the United States defeated Yugoslavia in a final round eliminating a favorite team from medal contention. The U.S. captured their fourth bronze medal in the event, but their first since 1932. As early favorites, the Soviet Union took the gold, and the team from Hungary took the silver medal.

=== Marriage ===
Sheerer was married at Stanford Memorial Church to 1968 U.S. Olympian and silver diving medalist Ann Peterson in early 1970. Peterson coached diving at Stanford in 1978, and had formerly coached at DeAnza College and Awalt High School, where Gary Sheerer graduated. The couple met in Winnipeg Canada during the Pan Am Games in 1967.

=== Honors ===
In his more noteworthy honors and awards, in 1969, Sheerer received the Lawrence J. Johnson trophy as the top aquatic athletic competitor. In 1982, he was inducted into the USA Water Polo Hall of Fame, and was later an inductee into the International Water Polo Hall of Fame in 1984.

== See also ==
- List of Olympic medalists in water polo (men)
