= Robert Horn (water polo) =

American water polo player (1931–2019)

Bob Horn
- As UCLA Coach in 1982

Biographical details
- Born: November 3, 1931; Minneapolis, Minnesota
- Died: January 11, 2019 (aged 87); Manhattan Beach, California
- Height: 190 cm (6 ft 3 in)
- Weight: 84 kg (185 lb)
- Education: Fullerton College; Long Beach State, B.A. M.A.

Playing career
- 1950–52 1957–58: Fullerton College; Long Beach State
- Positions: Swimming, Water Polo

Coaching career (HC unless noted)
- 1959–1965: Cal State Long Beach; Head Swim and W. P. Coach
- 1964–1990: UCLA Bruins; W.P. Coach
- 1963-1974: UCLA Bruins; Swim Coach
- 1968, 1972: U.S. Olympic Water Polo Teams; Coaching staff

Head coaching record
- Overall: 487–188–8

Accomplishments and honors

Championships
- 3 NCAA Water Polo Championships; 7 PAC-8 League Championships (UCLA)

Awards
- 1965– NCAA Water Polo Coach of the Year; 1972 – NCAA Swimming Coach of the Year. '76 U.S. Water Polo Hall of Fame '99 UCLA Hall of Fame '88 Long Beach State College Hall of Fame; Fullerton Community College Hall of Fame
Medal record
Representing United States
Pan American Games
Silver medal – second place	1955 Mexico City	Men's tournament

Robert Martin Horn (November 3, 1931 – January 11, 2019) was a collegiate swimmer and Water Polo Player for Fullerton College and Long Beach State, who as the first full-time UCLA swimming and Water Polo Coach from around 1964–1991 led the Bruins to 3 NCAA Water Polo Championships in 1969, 1970–72, and 7 Water Polo PAC-8 league championships from 1964 to 1971. Horn coached the UCLA Men's swimming team from 1963–74, and then coached the Water Polo team exclusively. He represented the United States in Water Polo as an outstanding goalie in the 1956 Summer Olympics in Melbourne and the 1960 Summer Olympics in Rome.

Horn was born in Minneapolis, Minnesota, on November 3, 1931. Around 1935, he moved with his mother and older brother to Whittier, California. He attended Whittier High School, known as Whittier Union High School when he attended, and as a sophomore competed with their water polo team. Graduating Whittier in June 1949, he played in the Orchestra as a violinist. He competed with the Whittier Swim Club water polo team when they won the 1950 National AAU Water Polo Championships. During his High School years, Horn played Water Polo from 1947 to 1949. A nationally recognized program, the Whittier Swim club water polo team won the 1949 and 1950 AAU National Championships and the 1951 team was a runner-up.

== Collegiate era athletics ==
Horn went to Fullerton College from 1950 to 1952 where he participated on both the swim and Water Polo Teams, and helped lead the team to a Southern California Championship in the 1951 school year. At Fullerton, he was coached by International Hall of Fame inductee Jimmy Smith, who was an Officer in the Naval Reserves, coached at the Naval Air Station at Los Alamitos where Horn played Water Polo, and coached the U.S. Water Polo teams at the Pan American Games in 1955 where Horn would play and medal. Playing for the Fullerton-Whittier Swim Club water polo team, Horn attended the Water Polo Olympic trials at New York's Astoria Park Pool in July 1952.

After attending Fullerton College, Horn served in the Naval Air Force during the Korean War in the early 1950s. He trained and played water polo with the U.S. Olympic team, preparing for the 1956 Olympics, during his Naval service at the Naval Air Station at Los Alamitos, California. Completing his naval service, he then attended California State University, Long Beach for the 1957–58 year where he played water polo, was named an All-American, and won the student athlete of the year award. In 1957–58, while Horn was playing Water Polo at CSU Long Beach, the team won the PAC Conference Championship. He completed both a B.A. and Masters from Cal State Long Beach around 1958.

=== 1956 and 1960 Olympics ===
He was a member and Captain of the American water polo team that placed fifth in the 1956 Olympic tournament, where he played five matches as goalkeeper. Four years later, he finished seventh with the American team in the 1960 Olympic tournament, competing in four matches as goalkeeper. Horn served as captain of the U.S. Water Polo Team at the 1955 Pan American Games, as captain of the 1956 Olympic squad, and as a member of the 1960 Olympic team at the Rome Games. He was considered at the time to be America's greatest Water Polo goalie.

== Swimming and Water Polo Coach ==
After completing his career as a college athlete, Horn first coached at Cerritos Jr. College, a community college in Norwalk, California, for two years from 1959 to 1961, where he led the team to both Metropolitan and Western State Conference Championships. He led the swimming and Water Polo program at Cal State Long Beach from 1959 to 1965, where the team won the 1959 PAC Conference Championship.

=== Coaching UCLA ===
He began his position as UCLA's first full-time Aquatics coach, managing both the Swim and Water Polo teams from around 1965–1973, then coached only Water Polo from 1973 to 1991. In his UCLA coaching tenure roughly between 1964 and 1991, he led the Bruins to 3 NCAA Water Polo Championships, one in 1969 and two between 1971 and 1972, and 7 Water Polo PAC-8 league championships from 1964 to 1971. In 1988, his UCLA team won the Club National Championship, the first time a team consisting entirely of collegiate athletes won the Club National Title. He is still considered the UCLA coach with the most number of wins, as he won 50 consecutive Water Polo matches and coached four undefeated teams between 1964 and 1968. Horn's 1969 team, went 19–0 to become the first NCAA champions in the history of American Water Polo. During his coaching career, he mentored 36 first team All Americans, and 26 Olympians in swimming and water polo. Improving opportunities for women's swimming, he allowed diver Susie Kinkade to join UCLA's men's swim team around 1973 when the school had yet to develop a separate women's program.

Horn was a part of the coaching staff for the 1968 and 1972 U.S. Olympic Water Polo teams. The 1972 Olympic team he helped coach in Munich won a team bronze medal. He also helped coach the U.S. team for two Pan American games and later 2 World University Games.

== Personal life ==
Horn enjoyed lifeguarding, riding horseback, surfing, waterskiing, travelling, and spending time with family. He was musical, and played both the ukulele and violin. In his retirement, he lived for a period in a cabin in the Sierras.

He died on January 11, 2019, after a long illness. He was survived by his wife Dorothy, five children, and seven grandchildren.

== Honors ==
As an athlete in Water Polo, he was an All California state selection in 1957–1958 during his time at Long Beach State University. In 1977, he was inducted into the USA Water Polo Hall of Fame. In 1965, he was recognized as the “NCAA Water Polo Coach of the Year” and in 1972 as the “NCAA Swimming Coach of the Year”. He was also a Hall of Fame member of the University of California at Los Angeles, Long Beach State College, and Fullerton Community College. Horn served as President of the Southern California Water Polo & Swimming Association.

== See also ==
- List of men's Olympic water polo tournament goalkeepers
