= Monte Nitzkowski =

Biographical details
- Born: September 7, 1929; Pasadena, California, U.S.
- Died: July 28, 2016 (aged 86); Huntington Beach, California, U.S.
- Education: Fullerton Jr. College; UCLA; B.A. '52 M.A. '55

Playing career
- 1948-1952: Fullerton Jr. College; UCLA
- Positions: Breaststroke, Butterfly, Water Polo

Coaching career (HC unless noted)
- 1954-1989: Long Beach City College
- 1972, 76, 84: U.S. Olympic WP Team

Accomplishments and honors

Championships
- 32 Conference WP championships (Long Beach City College)

Awards
- '91 International Swimming Hall of Fame '93 USA Water Polo Hall of Fame '2005 Fullerton College Hall of Fame '2006 UCLA Athletics Hall of Fame

Kenneth Monfore "Monte" Nitzkowski (September 7, 1929 – July 28, 2016) was an American former competition swimmer, and water polo competitor for the University of California at Los Angeles, and a Hall of Fame water polo coach for Long Beach City College from 1952-1989, where he led his teams to 32 conference water polo championships in 34 years. He served as a U.S. Olympic Water Polo team coach in 1968, 1972, 1980, and 1984, and was a Pan American Games coach for the U.S. team four times.

== Education ==
He was born in Pasadena, California on September 7, 1929 to Victor and Millicent Nitzkowski. His family soon moved to Huntington Beach, where in 1947, he graduated Huntington Beach High School.

He attended Fullerton Junior College for two years from 1948-1950, a nationally recognized team coached in Water Polo and swimming by Hall of Fame Coach James R. Smith, a WWII Navy veteran and U.S. National team coach. At Fullerton, he earned honors as an All American Junior College swimmer, and a medley relay team national record holder.

Transferring from Fullerton in 1950, he swam and played water polo for the UCLA Bruins in 1950 and 1951. At UCLA, he captained the swim team, received All-Coast honors in Water Polo, and was a swimming All American. He captured two conference championships at UCLA, and set a new Pacific Coast Conference record for the 200-yard breaststroke. After graduation from UCLA, he began Naval service, and was stationed at the U.S. Naval Academy, where he trained and made the 1952 Olympic Swim team. He dedicated himself to international swimming competition, with the Olympics as an objective.

== 1952 Olympics ==
Swimming for the United States Naval team, he represented the United States in the 200-meter butterfly at the 1952 Summer Olympics in Helsinki, Finland, where he finished with the eleventh-best time overall.

== Coaching ==
After completing his Naval service, Nitzkowski earned a master's degree in history and teaching credentials from CSU Long Beach in 1955, where he was an instructor. He became one of the world's foremost authorities in water polo while coaching Long Beach City College to 32 conference water polo championships in 34 years and 12 swim titles. Establishing an exceptional record, his Long Beach water polo teams went without a loss for eight consecutive seasons. He was known for applying his knowledge of the complex offensive and defensive strategies used in soccer and basketball to the game of water polo. He devised innovative counterattack strategies, switching quickly from defense to offense, similar to the "quick break" move used in basketball.

=== International coaching ===
Nitzkowski acted as the U.S. water polo assistant coach at the 1968 Olympics and was appointed head coach for the 1972, 1980 and 1984 games. In both the 1968 and 1972 Olympics, he co-coached with fellow Southern California Hall of Fame Water Polo Coach Robert Horn, against whom his college team would also compete. His Olympic teams won a bronze medal in the Munich in 1972, and a silver in Los Angeles in 1984. His 1980 water polo squad, though considered outstanding, did not participate in the Olympics due to the U.S. boycott. Highly active in international coaching, he was Head U.S. team coach for Water Polo at the 1979 and 1983 Pan American Games, and an Assistant Coach at the 1967 and 1975 games. He served as the U.S. National team coach from 1977-1984, and acted as coach of four American Pan American Teams from 1967 through 1983, where the U.S. teams won gold medals in all but one competition.

In his retirement, he owned Vic's Restaurant in Huntingdon Beach, California. He was the author of "Water Polo: Learning and Teaching the Basics". He summered on the Maine coastline, enjoyed playing the Ukulele, a hobby that grew in popularity among beachgoers, surfers and swimmers in the 1950s, travelled extensively and spent time with family. Nitzkowski died at his home in Huntingdon Beach, California on July 28, 2016. He was survived by his wife Barbara, children, and grandchildren.

=== Honors ===
Nitzkowski was inducted into the International Swimming Hall of Fame in 1991, the USA Water Polo Hall of Fame in 1993, the Fullerton College Athletic Hall of Fame in 2005, and the UCLA Athletics Hall of Fame in 2006. In 2016, he was inducted into the National Polish-American Sports Hall of Fame. He was also made a member of the Aquatic Capital Hall of Fame in 2016.

As a lasting legacy, the "Monte Nitzkowski Elite Coaching Award for Water Polo," one of Water Polo's most distinguished forms of recognition, is given in his honor.

== See also ==
- List of members of the International Swimming Hall of Fame
- List of University of California, Los Angeles people

== Bibliography ==
- Nitzkowski, Monte, United States Tactical Water Polo, Sports Support Syndicate / Mark Rauterkus (1994). ISBN 1-878602-93-4.
