= United States men's Olympic water polo team statistics (appearances) =

This article contains lists of appearances of the United States men's national water polo team rosters at the Summer Olympics, and is part of the United States men's Olympic water polo team statistics series. The lists are updated as of March 30, 2020.

== Abbreviations ==
No.	Cap number	Rk	Rank	App	Appearance	Ref	Reference
H	Handedness	L	Left-handed	R	Right-handed		
Pos	Playing position	FP	Field player	GK	Goalkeeper		
CB	Center back (2-meter defense)	CF	Center forward (2-meter offense)	D	Driver (attacker)	U	Utility (except goalkeeper)

== Appearances ==
=== Players ===
The following table is pre-sorted by number of Olympic appearances (in descending order), date of the last Olympic appearance (in ascending order), date of the first Olympic appearance (in ascending order), name of the person (in ascending order), respectively.

Sixteen American athletes have each made at least three Olympic appearances. Tony Azevedo is the first and only American water polo player (man or woman) to have competed in five Olympic Games.

Rk	Name	Pos	H	App	Games as player	Period	Birthdate	Age of first Olympic app	Age of last Olympic app	Ref
1	Tony Azevedo	D	R	5	2000, 2004, 2008 (silver) , 2012, 2016	15 years, 326 days	Nov 21, 1981	18 years, 307 days	34 years, 267 days	
2	Wally O'Connor	FP		4	1924 (bronze) , 1928, 1932 (bronze) , 1936	12 years, 28 days	Aug 25, 1903	20 years, 323 days	32 years, 351 days	
2	Ryan Bailey	CF	R	4	2000, 2004, 2008 (silver) , 2012	11 years, 324 days	Aug 28, 1975	25 years, 26 days	36 years, 350 days	
2	Jesse Smith	CB/U	R	4	2004, 2008 (silver) , 2012, 2016	11 years, 365 days	Apr 27, 1983	21 years, 110 days	33 years, 109 days	
5	Ron Crawford	D/CF	R	3	1960, 1964, 1968	8 years, 60 days	Dec 6, 1939	20 years, 264 days	28 years, 324 days	
5	Stan Cole	CF/D	R	3	1964, 1968, 1972 (bronze)	7 years, 329 days	Oct 12, 1945	18 years, 365 days	26 years, 328 days	
5	Terry Schroeder	CF		3	1984 (silver) , 1988 (silver) , 1992	8 years, 8 days	Oct 9, 1958	25 years, 297 days	33 years, 305 days	
5	Craig Wilson	GK		3	1984 (silver) , 1988 (silver) , 1992	8 years, 8 days	Feb 5, 1957	27 years, 178 days	35 years, 186 days	
5	Chris Duplanty	GK		3	1988 (silver) , 1992, 1996	7 years, 311 days	Oct 21, 1965	22 years, 336 days	30 years, 281 days	
5	Mike Evans	D		3	1988 (silver) , 1992, 1996	7 years, 311 days	Mar 26, 1960	28 years, 179 days	36 years, 124 days	
5	Chris Humbert	CF	L	3	1992, 1996, 2000	8 years, 61 days	Dec 27, 1969	22 years, 218 days	30 years, 279 days	
5	Wolf Wigo	D		3	1996, 2000, 2004	8 years, 40 days	May 8, 1973	23 years, 73 days	31 years, 113 days	
5	Layne Beaubien	CB/U	R	3	2004, 2008 (silver) , 2012	7 years, 363 days	Jul 4, 1976	28 years, 42 days	36 years, 39 days	
5	Jeff Powers	CF/CB/U	R	3	2004, 2008 (silver) , 2012	7 years, 363 days	Jan 21, 1980	24 years, 207 days	32 years, 204 days	
5	Adam Wright	D	R	3	2004, 2008 (silver) , 2012	7 years, 363 days	May 4, 1977	27 years, 103 days	35 years, 100 days	
5	Merrill Moses	GK	R	3	2008 (silver) , 2012, 2016	8 years, 4 days	Aug 13, 1977	30 years, 363 days	39 years, 1 day	
17	Herb Vollmer	FP		2	1920, 1924 (bronze)	3 years, 331 days	Feb 15, 1895	25 years, 191 days	29 years, 156 days	
17	George Mitchell	FP		2	1924 (bronze) , 1928	4 years, 29 days	Apr 23, 1901	23 years, 81 days	27 years, 110 days	
17	George Schroth	FP		2	1924 (bronze) , 1928	4 years, 29 days	Dec 31, 1899	24 years, 195 days	28 years, 224 days	
17	Johnny Weissmuller	FP		2	1924 (bronze) , 1928	4 years, 29 days	Jun 2, 1904	20 years, 41 days	24 years, 70 days	
17	Fred Lauer	GK		2	1924 (bronze) , 1936	12 years, 28 days	Oct 13, 1898	25 years, 274 days	37 years, 302 days	
17	Phil Daubenspeck	FP		2	1932 (bronze) , 1936	4 years, 4 days	Oct 28, 1905	26 years, 283 days	30 years, 287 days	
17	Charley Finn	FP		2	1932 (bronze) , 1936	4 years, 4 days	Jul 28, 1897	35 years, 9 days	39 years, 13 days	
17	Harold McCallister	FP		2	1932 (bronze) , 1936	4 years, 4 days	Oct 14, 1903	28 years, 297 days	32 years, 301 days	
17	Herb Wildman	GK		2	1932 (bronze) , 1936	4 years, 4 days	Sep 6, 1912	19 years, 335 days	23 years, 339 days	
17	Kenneth Beck	FP		2	1936, 1948	11 years, 361 days	Apr 19, 1915	21 years, 111 days	33 years, 106 days	
17	Dixon Fiske	FP		2	1936, 1948	11 years, 361 days	Sep 7, 1914	21 years, 336 days	33 years, 331 days	
17	Bob Hughes	CF		2	1952, 1956	4 years, 133 days	Dec 15, 1930	21 years, 223 days	25 years, 356 days	
17	Bill Kooistra	FP		2	1952, 1956	4 years, 133 days	Aug 26, 1926	25 years, 334 days	30 years, 101 days	
17	Marvin Burns	FP		2	1952, 1960	8 years, 40 days	Jul 6, 1928	24 years, 19 days	32 years, 59 days	
17	Robert Horn	GK		2	1956, 1960	3 years, 280 days	Nov 1, 1931	25 years, 27 days	28 years, 307 days	
17	Ronald Severa	FP		2	1956, 1960	3 years, 280 days	Aug 13, 1936	20 years, 107 days	24 years, 21 days	
17	Wally Wolf	FP		2	1956, 1960	3 years, 280 days	Oct 2, 1930	26 years, 57 days	29 years, 337 days	
17	Chick McIlroy	D/CF	R	2	1960, 1964	4 years, 48 days	Aug 1, 1938	22 years, 25 days	26 years, 73 days	
17	Dave Ashleigh	FP	R	2	1964, 1968	4 years, 14 days	Aug 8, 1943	21 years, 64 days	25 years, 78 days	
17	Tony van Dorp	GK	R	2	1964, 1968	4 years, 14 days	Jun 25, 1936	28 years, 108 days	32 years, 122 days	
17	Steve Barnett	GK		2	1968, 1972 (bronze)	3 years, 326 days	Jun 6, 1943	25 years, 130 days	29 years, 90 days	
17	Bruce Bradley	FP		2	1968, 1972 (bronze)	3 years, 326 days	Jan 15, 1947	21 years, 273 days	25 years, 233 days	
17	John Parker	FP		2	1968, 1972 (bronze)	3 years, 326 days	Sep 13, 1946	22 years, 31 days	25 years, 357 days	
17	Gary Sheerer	FP		2	1968, 1972 (bronze)	3 years, 326 days	Feb 18, 1947	21 years, 239 days	25 years, 199 days	
17	Russ Webb	CB		2	1968, 1972 (bronze)	3 years, 326 days	Jun 1, 1945	23 years, 135 days	27 years, 95 days	
17	Barry Weitzenberg	FP		2	1968, 1972 (bronze)	3 years, 326 days	Sep 30, 1946	22 years, 14 days	25 years, 340 days	
17	Jody Campbell	CF		2	1984 (silver) , 1988 (silver)	4 years, 61 days	Mar 4, 1960	24 years, 150 days	28 years, 211 days	
17	Peter Campbell	CF/U		2	1984 (silver) , 1988 (silver)	4 years, 61 days	May 21, 1960	24 years, 72 days	28 years, 133 days	
17	Kevin Robertson	D	L	2	1984 (silver) , 1988 (silver)	4 years, 61 days	Feb 2, 1959	25 years, 181 days	29 years, 242 days	
17	Jeff Campbell	CB		2	1988 (silver) , 1992	3 years, 323 days	Oct 2, 1962	25 years, 355 days	29 years, 312 days	
17	Doug Kimbell	CB		2	1988 (silver) , 1992	3 years, 323 days	Jun 22, 1960	28 years, 91 days	32 years, 48 days	
17	Craig Klass	CF	L	2	1988 (silver) , 1992	3 years, 323 days	Jun 20, 1965	23 years, 93 days	27 years, 50 days	
17	Kirk Everist	D		2	1992, 1996	3 years, 362 days	Apr 12, 1967	25 years, 111 days	29 years, 107 days	
17	Alex Rousseau	CF	L	2	1992, 1996	3 years, 362 days	Nov 4, 1967	24 years, 271 days	28 years, 267 days	
17	Gavin Arroyo	CB		2	1996, 2000	4 years, 73 days	May 10, 1972	24 years, 71 days	28 years, 144 days	
17	Dan Hackett	GK		2	1996, 2000	4 years, 73 days	Sep 11, 1970	25 years, 313 days	30 years, 20 days	
17	Kyle Kopp	CF		2	1996, 2000	4 years, 73 days	Nov 10, 1966	29 years, 253 days	33 years, 326 days	
17	Chris Oeding	D		2	1996, 2000	4 years, 73 days	Sep 10, 1971	24 years, 314 days	29 years, 21 days	
17	Brandon Brooks	GK	R	2	2004, 2008 (silver)	4 years, 9 days	Apr 29, 1981	23 years, 108 days	27 years, 117 days	
17	Peter Hudnut	CB	R	2	2008 (silver) , 2012	4 years, 2 days	Feb 16, 1980	28 years, 176 days	32 years, 178 days	
17	Tim Hutten	CB	R	2	2008 (silver) , 2012	4 years, 2 days	Jun 4, 1985	23 years, 67 days	27 years, 69 days	
17	Peter Varellas	D	L	2	2008 (silver) , 2012	4 years, 2 days	Oct 2, 1984	23 years, 313 days	27 years, 315 days	
17	John Mann	CF	R	2	2012, 2016	4 years, 16 days	Jun 27, 1985	27 years, 32 days	31 years, 48 days	
60	Gwynne Evans			1	1904 (bronze)	0 days	Sep 3, 1880	24 years, 2 days	24 years, 2 days	
60	Gus Goessling			1	1904 (bronze)	0 days	Nov 17, 1878	25 years, 293 days	25 years, 293 days	
60	John Meyers			1	1904 (bronze)	0 days	Jun 28, 1880	24 years, 69 days	24 years, 69 days	
60	Bill Orthwein			1	1904 (bronze)	0 days	Oct 16, 1881	22 years, 325 days	22 years, 325 days	
60	Amedee Reyburn			1	1904 (bronze)	0 days	Mar 25, 1879	25 years, 164 days	25 years, 164 days	
60	Frank Schreiner			1	1904 (bronze)	0 days	Mar 24, 1879	25 years, 165 days	25 years, 165 days	
60	Manfred Toeppen			1	1904 (bronze)	0 days	Sep 3, 1887	17 years, 2 days	17 years, 2 days	
60	David Bratton			1	1904 (gold)	1 day	Oct 1869			
60	Budd Goodwin	FP		1	1904 (gold)	1 day	Nov 13, 1883	20 years, 297 days	20 years, 298 days	
60	Louis Handley	FP		1	1904 (gold)	1 day	Feb 14, 1874	30 years, 204 days	30 years, 205 days	
60	David Hesser	FP		1	1904 (gold)	1 day	Jan 1884			
60	Joe Ruddy	FP		1	1904 (gold)	1 day	Sep 28, 1878	25 years, 343 days	25 years, 344 days	
60	James Steen			1	1904 (gold)	1 day	Nov 19, 1876	27 years, 291 days	27 years, 292 days	
60	George Van Cleaf	FP		1	1904 (gold)	1 day	Oct 8, 1879	24 years, 333 days	24 years, 334 days	
60	Rex Beach			1	1904 (silver)	0 days	Sep 1, 1877	27 years, 5 days	27 years, 5 days	
60	David Hammond			1	1904 (silver)	0 days	Jan 5, 1881	23 years, 245 days	23 years, 245 days	
60	Charles Healy			1	1904 (silver)	0 days	Oct 4, 1883	20 years, 338 days	20 years, 338 days	
60	Frank Kehoe			1	1904 (silver)	0 days				
60	Jerome Steever			1	1904 (silver)	0 days	Jan 7, 1880	24 years, 243 days	24 years, 243 days	
60	Edwin Swatek			1	1904 (silver)	0 days	Jan 7, 1885	19 years, 243 days	19 years, 243 days	
60	Bill Tuttle			1	1904 (silver)	0 days	Feb 21, 1882	22 years, 198 days	22 years, 198 days	
60	Clement Browne			1	1920	5 days	Jan 4, 1896	24 years, 233 days	24 years, 238 days	
60	James Carson	FP		1	1920	5 days	Jul 30, 1901	19 years, 25 days	19 years, 30 days	
60	Harry Hebner	FP		1	1920	5 days	Jun 15, 1891	29 years, 70 days	29 years, 75 days	
60	Sophus Jensen			1	1920	5 days	Jul 27, 1889	31 years, 28 days	31 years, 33 days	
60	Mike McDermott	FP		1	1920	5 days	Jan 18, 1893	27 years, 219 days	27 years, 224 days	
60	Perry McGillivray	FP		1	1920	5 days	Aug 5, 1893	27 years, 19 days	27 years, 24 days	
60	Norman Ross			1	1920	5 days	May 2, 1896	24 years, 114 days	24 years, 119 days	
60	Preston Steiger			1	1920	5 days	Sep 6, 1898	21 years, 353 days	21 years, 358 days	
60	Herbert Taylor			1	1920	5 days	Jun 7, 1892	28 years, 78 days	28 years, 83 days	
60	William Vosburgh	FP		1	1920	5 days	Dec 16, 1890	29 years, 252 days	29 years, 257 days	
60	Art Austin	FP		1	1924 (bronze)	7 days	Jul 8, 1902	22 years, 5 days	22 years, 12 days	
60	Elmer Collett	GK		1	1924 (bronze)	7 days	1903			
60	Jam Handy	FP		1	1924 (bronze)	7 days	Mar 6, 1886	38 years, 129 days	38 years, 136 days	
60	Oliver Horn	FP		1	1924 (bronze)	7 days	Jun 22, 1901	23 years, 21 days	23 years, 28 days	
60	John Norton	FP		1	1924 (bronze)	7 days	Nov 27, 1899	24 years, 229 days	24 years, 236 days	
60	John Cattus	GK		1	1928	5 days				
60	Harry Daniels	GK		1	1928	5 days	Jun 23, 1900	28 years, 44 days	28 years, 49 days	
60	Joseph Farley	FP		1	1928	5 days				
60	Richard Greenberg	FP		1	1928	5 days	Jun 13, 1902	26 years, 54 days	26 years, 59 days	
60	Sam Greller	FP		1	1928	5 days	May 18, 1905	23 years, 80 days	23 years, 85 days	
60	Paul Samson	FP		1	1928	5 days	Jun 12, 1905	23 years, 55 days	23 years, 60 days	
60	Herbert Topp	FP		1	1928	5 days	Apr 20, 1900	28 years, 108 days	28 years, 113 days	
60	Austin Clapp	FP		1	1932 (bronze)	5 days	Nov 8, 1910	21 years, 272 days	21 years, 277 days	
60	Cal Strong	FP		1	1932 (bronze)	5 days	Aug 12, 1907	24 years, 360 days	24 years, 365 days	
60	Ray Ruddy	FP		1	1936	2 days	Aug 31, 1911	24 years, 343 days	24 years, 345 days	
60	Bob Bray	CF		1	1948	4 days	Sep 27, 1919	28 years, 307 days	28 years, 311 days	
60	Ralph Budelman	GK		1	1948	4 days	Apr 19, 1918	30 years, 102 days	30 years, 106 days	
60	Lee Case	FP		1	1948	4 days	Aug 8, 1917	30 years, 357 days	30 years, 361 days	
60	Chris Christensen	FP		1	1948	4 days	Nov 15, 1918	29 years, 258 days	29 years, 262 days	
60	Harold Dash	FP		1	1948	4 days	Jul 22, 1917	31 years, 8 days	31 years, 12 days	
60	Edwin Knox	FP		1	1948	4 days	Jul 24, 1914	34 years, 6 days	34 years, 10 days	
60	Harry Bisbey	GK		1	1952	8 days	May 10, 1931	21 years, 76 days	21 years, 84 days	
60	Bill Dornblaser	FP		1	1952	8 days	Nov 4, 1933	18 years, 264 days	18 years, 272 days	
60	Edward Jaworski	FP		1	1952	8 days	Mar 11, 1926	26 years, 136 days	26 years, 144 days	
60	Norman Lake	FP		1	1952	8 days	Dec 8, 1932	19 years, 230 days	19 years, 238 days	
60	Jim Norris	CB		1	1952	8 days	Jul 7, 1930	22 years, 18 days	22 years, 26 days	
60	Jack Spargo	D		1	1952	8 days	Jun 3, 1931	21 years, 52 days	21 years, 60 days	
60	Peter Stange	FP		1	1952	8 days	Feb 28, 1931	21 years, 148 days	21 years, 156 days	
60	Bob Frojen	FP		1	1956	7 days	Dec 1, 1930	25 years, 363 days	26 years, 4 days	
60	Jim Gaughran	FP		1	1956	7 days	Jul 5, 1932	24 years, 146 days	24 years, 153 days	
60	Ken Hahn	GK		1	1956	7 days	Jun 5, 1928	28 years, 176 days	28 years, 183 days	
60	Sam Kooistra	FP		1	1956	7 days	Aug 18, 1935	21 years, 102 days	21 years, 109 days	
60	Bill Ross	FP		1	1956	7 days	Jul 6, 1928	28 years, 145 days	28 years, 152 days	
60	Chuck Bittick	FP		1	1960	8 days	Nov 2, 1939	20 years, 298 days	20 years, 306 days	
60	Gordie Hall	GK		1	1960	8 days	Nov 27, 1935	24 years, 273 days	24 years, 281 days	
60	Fred Tisue	FP		1	1960	8 days	Oct 17, 1938	21 years, 314 days	21 years, 322 days	
60	Ron Volmer	FP		1	1960	8 days	Nov 22, 1935	24 years, 278 days	24 years, 286 days	
60	Dan Drown	FP	R	1	1964	2 days	Oct 24, 1942	21 years, 353 days	21 years, 355 days	
60	Ned McIlroy	FP	R	1	1964	2 days	Jul 26, 1939	25 years, 77 days	25 years, 79 days	
60	Paul McIlroy	FP	R	1	1964	2 days	May 12, 1937	27 years, 152 days	27 years, 154 days	
60	Bob Saari	FP	R	1	1964	2 days	Jun 7, 1948	16 years, 126 days	16 years, 128 days	
60	George Stransky	GK	R	1	1964	2 days	Jan 16, 1944	20 years, 269 days	20 years, 271 days	
60	Ralph Whitney	FP	R	1	1964	2 days	Oct 30, 1936	27 years, 347 days	27 years, 349 days	
60	Dean Willeford	FP		1	1968	11 days	Oct 9, 1944	24 years, 5 days	24 years, 16 days	
60	Peter Asch	FP		1	1972 (bronze)	8 days	Oct 16, 1948	23 years, 316 days	23 years, 324 days	
60	Jim Ferguson	D		1	1972 (bronze)	8 days	Apr 27, 1949	23 years, 122 days	23 years, 130 days	
60	Eric Lindroth	CF	L	1	1972 (bronze)	8 days	Sep 12, 1951	20 years, 350 days	20 years, 358 days	
60	Jim Slatton	GK		1	1972 (bronze)	8 days	Jul 30, 1947	25 years, 28 days	25 years, 36 days	
60	Doug Burke	D		1	1984 (silver)	9 days	Mar 30, 1957	27 years, 124 days	27 years, 133 days	
60	Chris Dorst	GK		1	1984 (silver)	9 days	Jun 5, 1956	28 years, 57 days	28 years, 66 days	
60	Gary Figueroa	D		1	1984 (silver)	9 days	Sep 28, 1956	27 years, 308 days	27 years, 317 days	
60	Drew McDonald	CB		1	1984 (silver)	9 days	Oct 19, 1955	28 years, 287 days	28 years, 296 days	
60	Tim Shaw	D		1	1984 (silver)	9 days	Nov 8, 1957	26 years, 267 days	26 years, 276 days	
60	John Siman	CB		1	1984 (silver)	9 days	Oct 7, 1952	31 years, 299 days	31 years, 308 days	
60	Jon Svendsen	CB		1	1984 (silver)	9 days	Oct 26, 1953	30 years, 280 days	30 years, 289 days	
60	Joe Vargas	D		1	1984 (silver)	9 days	Oct 4, 1955	28 years, 302 days	28 years, 311 days	
60	James Bergeson	D		1	1988 (silver)	10 days	Mar 21, 1961	27 years, 184 days	27 years, 194 days	
60	Greg Boyer	CF		1	1988 (silver)	10 days	Feb 5, 1958	30 years, 229 days	30 years, 239 days	
60	Alan Mouchawar	U		1	1988 (silver)	10 days	Aug 3, 1960	28 years, 49 days	28 years, 59 days	
60	Erich Fischer	CB/U		1	1992	8 days	Mar 12, 1966	26 years, 142 days	26 years, 150 days	
60	Charlie Harris	CF		1	1992	8 days	Nov 9, 1963	28 years, 266 days	28 years, 274 days	
60	John Vargas	D		1	1992	8 days	Jun 17, 1961	31 years, 45 days	31 years, 53 days	
60	Troy Barnhart, Jr.	CF		1	1996	8 days	May 22, 1971	25 years, 59 days	25 years, 67 days	
60	Jeremy Laster	D	L	1	1996	8 days	Feb 24, 1974	22 years, 147 days	22 years, 155 days	
60	Rick McNair	CB		1	1996	8 days	Sep 10, 1971	24 years, 314 days	24 years, 322 days	
60	Sean Kern	CF/CB		1	2000	8 days	Jul 11, 1978	22 years, 74 days	22 years, 82 days	
60	Chi Kredell	CB		1	2000	8 days	Feb 16, 1971	29 years, 220 days	29 years, 228 days	
60	Robert Lynn	CB/U		1	2000	8 days	Feb 7, 1967	33 years, 229 days	33 years, 237 days	
60	Sean Nolan	GK		1	2000	8 days	Jul 18, 1972	28 years, 67 days	28 years, 75 days	
60	Brad Schumacher	D		1	2000	8 days	Mar 6, 1974	26 years, 201 days	26 years, 209 days	
60	Omar Amr	D		1	2004	14 days	Sep 20, 1974	29 years, 330 days	29 years, 344 days	
60	Genai Kerr	GK		1	2004	14 days	Dec 25, 1976	27 years, 234 days	27 years, 248 days	
60	Dan Klatt	CB		1	2004	14 days	Oct 28, 1978	25 years, 292 days	25 years, 306 days	
60	Brett Ormsby	D		1	2004	14 days	Dec 1, 1982	21 years, 258 days	21 years, 272 days	
60	Chris Segesman	CB		1	2004	14 days	Jun 17, 1979	25 years, 59 days	25 years, 73 days	
60	J. W. Krumpholz	CF	R	1	2008 (silver)	14 days	Sep 22, 1987	20 years, 323 days	20 years, 337 days	
60	Rick Merlo	U	R	1	2008 (silver)	14 days	Aug 5, 1982	26 years, 5 days	26 years, 19 days	
60	Shea Buckner	D	R	1	2012	14 days	Dec 12, 1986	25 years, 230 days	25 years, 244 days	
60	Chay Lapin	GK	R	1	2012	14 days	Feb 25, 1987	25 years, 155 days	25 years, 169 days	
60	McQuin Baron	GK	R	1	2016	8 days	Oct 27, 1995	20 years, 284 days	20 years, 292 days	
60	Bret Bonanni	D	R	1	2016	8 days	Jan 20, 1994	22 years, 199 days	22 years, 207 days	
60	Alex Bowen	D	R	1	2016	8 days	Sep 4, 1993	22 years, 337 days	22 years, 345 days	
60	Luca Cupido	D	R	1	2016	8 days	Nov 9, 1995	20 years, 271 days	20 years, 279 days	
60	Thomas Dunstan	D	L	1	2016	8 days	Sep 29, 1997	18 years, 312 days	18 years, 320 days	
60	Ben Hallock	CF	R	1	2016	8 days	Nov 22, 1997	18 years, 258 days	18 years, 266 days	
60	Alex Obert	CF/CB	R	1	2016	8 days	Dec 18, 1991	24 years, 232 days	24 years, 240 days	
60	Alex Roelse	CB	R	1	2016	8 days	Jan 10, 1995	21 years, 209 days	21 years, 217 days	
60	Josh Samuels	D	R	1	2016	8 days	Jul 8, 1991	25 years, 29 days	25 years, 37 days	
Rk	Name	Pos	H	App	Games as player	Period	Birthdate	Age of first Olympic app	Age of last Olympic app	Ref

==== Historical progression – appearances of players ====
The following table shows the historical progression of appearances of players at the Olympic Games.

App	Achievement	Games	No.	Player	Pos	H	Height	Date	Age	Duration of record	Ref
2	Set record	1924 (bronze)		Herb Vollmer	FP		6 ft 0 in (1.83 m)	Jul 13, 1924	29	8 years, 24 days	
2	Tied record	1928		George Mitchell	FP			Aug 6, 1928	27	8 years, 24 days	
2	Tied record	1928		Wally O'Connor	FP			Aug 6, 1928	24	8 years, 24 days	
2	Tied record	1928		George Schroth	FP		6 ft 4 in (1.93 m)	Aug 6, 1928	28	8 years, 24 days	
2	Tied record	1928		Johnny Weissmuller	FP		6 ft 3 in (1.91 m)	Aug 6, 1928	24	8 years, 24 days	
3	Broke record	1932 (bronze)		Wally O'Connor	FP			Aug 6, 1932	28	4 years, 2 days	
4	Broke record	1936		Wally O'Connor	FP			Aug 8, 1936	32	79 years, 364 days	
4	Tied record	2012	8	Tony Azevedo	D	R	6 ft 1 in (1.85 m)	Jul 29, 2012	30	79 years, 364 days	
4	Tied record	2012	9	Ryan Bailey	CF	R	6 ft 5.5 in (1.97 m)	Jul 29, 2012	36	79 years, 364 days	
5	Broke record	2016	8	Tony Azevedo	D	R	6 ft 1 in (1.85 m)	Aug 6, 2016	34	8 years, 224 days	

=== Head coaches ===
The following tables are pre-sorted by number of Olympic appearances (in descending order), date of the last Olympic appearance (in ascending order), date of the first Olympic appearance (in ascending order), name of the person (in ascending order), respectively.

Six men have each made two Olympic appearances as head coaches of the United States men's national team.

Rk	Name	App	Games as head coach	Period	Birthdate	Age of first Olympic app	Age of last Olympic app	Ref
1	Otto Wahle	2	1920, 1924 (bronze)	3 years, 331 days	Nov 5, 1879	40 years, 293 days	44 years, 258 days	
1	Neil Kohlhase	2	1956, 1960	3 years, 280 days				
1	Urho Saari	2	1952, 1964	12 years, 80 days				
1	Monte Nitzkowski	2	1972 (bronze) , 1984 (silver)	11 years, 349 days	Sep 7, 1929	42 years, 355 days	54 years, 338 days	
1	Bill Barnett	2	1988 (silver) , 1992	3 years, 323 days				
1	Terry Schroeder	2	2008 (silver) , 2012	4 years, 2 days	Oct 9, 1958	49 years, 306 days	53 years, 308 days	
7	Gus Sundstrom	1	1904 (gold)	1 day				
7	Alex Meffert	1	1904 (silver)	0 days				
7	(Unknown)	1	1904 (bronze)	0 days				
7	Perry McGillivray	1	1928	5 days	Aug 5, 1893	35 years, 1 day	35 years, 6 days	
7	Frank Rivas	1	1932 (bronze)	5 days				
7	Clyde Swendsen	1	1936	2 days	May 25, 1895	41 years, 75 days	41 years, 77 days	
7	Austin Clapp	1	1948	4 days	Nov 8, 1910	37 years, 265 days	37 years, 269 days	
7	Art Lambert	1	1968	9 days				
7	Richard Corso	1	1996	8 days				
7	John Vargas	1	2000	8 days	Jun 17, 1961	39 years, 98 days	39 years, 106 days	
7	Ratko Rudić	1	2004	14 days	Jun 7, 1948	56 years, 69 days	56 years, 83 days	
7	Dejan Udovičić	1	2016	8 days	Jul 27, 1970	46 years, 10 days	46 years, 18 days	
Rk	Name	App	Games as head coach	Period	Birthdate	Age of first Olympic app	Age of last Olympic app	Ref

Four Americans have each made Olympic appearances as players and as head coaches of the United States men's national team.

Rk	Name	App	Games		Period	Birthdate	Age of first Olympic app	Age of last Olympic app	Ref
Rk	Name	App	As player	As head coach	Period	Birthdate	Age of first Olympic app	Age of last Olympic app	Ref
1	Terry Schroeder	5	1984 (silver) , 1988 (silver) , 1992	2008 (silver) , 2012	28 years, 11 days	Oct 9, 1958	25 years, 297 days	53 years, 308 days	
2	Perry McGillivray	2	1920	1928	7 years, 353 days	Aug 5, 1893	27 years, 19 days	35 years, 6 days	
2	Austin Clapp	2	1932 (bronze)	1948	15 years, 363 days	Nov 8, 1910	21 years, 272 days	37 years, 269 days	
2	John Vargas	2	1992	2000	8 years, 61 days	Jun 17, 1961	31 years, 45 days	39 years, 106 days	

==== Historical progression – appearances of head coaches ====
The following table shows the historical progression of appearances of head coaches at the Olympic Games.

App	Achievement	Games	Head coach	Date	Age	Duration of record	Ref
1	Set record	1920	Otto Wahle	Aug 24, 1920	40	3 years, 324 days	
2	Broke record	1924 (bronze)	Otto Wahle	Jul 13, 1924	44	100 years, 248 days	
2	Tied record	1960	Neil Kohlhase	Aug 26, 1960		100 years, 248 days	
2	Tied record	1964	Urho Saari	Oct 11, 1964		100 years, 248 days	
2	Tied record	1984 (silver)	Monte Nitzkowski	Aug 1, 1984	54	100 years, 248 days	
2	Tied record	1992	Bill Barnett	Aug 1, 1992		100 years, 248 days	
2	Tied record	2012	Terry Schroeder	Jul 29, 2012	53	100 years, 248 days	

== Miscellaneous ==
=== Water polo families ===
==== Brothers ====
The three McIlroy brothers (Paul, Chick and Ned) were all members of the 1964 United States men's Olympic water polo team.

The Kooistra brothers (Bill and Sam) played for the United States in water polo at the 1956 Olympics. Jeff Campbell competed alongside his elder brother, Peter, at the 1988 Olympics.

Relation- ship	Family	Name	Pos	Birthdate	Games	Age	Note	Ref
Three brothers	McIlroy	Chick McIlroy	D/CF	Aug 1, 1938	1960	22 years, 25 days		
Three brothers	McIlroy	Paul McIlroy	FP	May 12, 1937	1964	27 years, 152 days	Three brothers in an Olympic tournament	
Three brothers	McIlroy	Chick McIlroy	D/CF	Aug 1, 1938	1964	26 years, 71 days	Three brothers in an Olympic tournament	
Three brothers	McIlroy	Ned McIlroy	FP	Jul 26, 1939	1964	25 years, 77 days	Three brothers in an Olympic tournament	
Two brothers	Kooistra	Bill Kooistra	FP	Aug 26, 1926	1952	25 years, 334 days		
Two brothers	Kooistra	Bill Kooistra	FP	Aug 26, 1926	1956	30 years, 94 days	Two brothers in an Olympic tournament	
Two brothers	Kooistra	Sam Kooistra	FP	Aug 18, 1935	1956	21 years, 102 days	Two brothers in an Olympic tournament	
Two brothers	Campbell	Peter Campbell	CF	May 21, 1960	1984 (silver)	24 years, 72 days		
Two brothers	Campbell	Peter Campbell	CF/U	May 21, 1960	1988 (silver)	28 years, 123 days	Two brothers in an Olympic tournament	
Two brothers	Campbell	Jeff Campbell	CB	Oct 2, 1962	1988 (silver)	25 years, 355 days	Two brothers in an Olympic tournament	
Two brothers	Campbell	Jeff Campbell	CB	Oct 2, 1962	1992	29 years, 304 days		
Two brothers	Vargas	Joe Vargas	D	Oct 4, 1955	1980^{*}	24 years, 290 days		
Two brothers	Vargas	Joe Vargas	D	Oct 4, 1955	1984 (silver)	28 years, 302 days		
Two brothers	Vargas	John Vargas	D	Jun 17, 1961	1992	31 years, 45 days		
Two brothers	Vargas	John Vargas	Coach	Jun 17, 1961	2000	39 years, 98 days		

^{*}Qualified but withdrew.

Tony van Dorp, a Dutch-American goalkeeper, competed in the 1964 and 1968 Summer Olympics for the United States. His younger brother, Fred, was a Dutch field player, and played against his brother at the 1964 and 1968 Olympics.

Relation- ship	Family	Country represented	Name	Pos	Birthdate	Games	Age	Note	Ref
Two brothers	van Dorp	Netherlands	Fred van Dorp	FP	Oct 13, 1938	1960	21 years, 318 days		
Two brothers	van Dorp	United States	Tony van Dorp	GK	Jun 25, 1936	1964	28 years, 110 days	NED 6–4 USA (Oct 13, 1964)	
Two brothers	van Dorp	Netherlands	Fred van Dorp	FP	Oct 13, 1938	1964	26 years, 0 days	NED 6–4 USA (Oct 13, 1964)	
Two brothers	van Dorp	United States	Tony van Dorp	GK	Jun 25, 1936	1968	32 years, 121 days	USA 6–3 NED (Oct 24, 1968)	
Two brothers	van Dorp	Netherlands	Fred van Dorp	FP	Oct 13, 1938	1968	30 years, 11 days	USA 6–3 NED (Oct 24, 1968)	

==== Father-son ====
Relation- ship	Family	Name	Pos	Birthdate	Games	Age	Note	Ref
Father and a son	Ruddy	Joe Ruddy	FP	Sep 28, 1878	1904 (gold)	25 years, 343 days		
Father and a son	Ruddy	Ray Ruddy	FP	Aug 31, 1911	1936	24 years, 343 days		
Father and a son	Saari	Urho Saari	Head coach		1952			
Father and a son	Saari	Urho Saari	Asst. coach		1960			
Father and a son	Saari	Urho Saari	Head coach		1964		Father and son in an Olympic tournament	
Father and a son	Saari	Bob Saari	FP	Jun 7, 1948	1964	16 years, 126 days	Father and son in an Olympic tournament	
Father and a son	Azevedo	Ricardo Azevedo	Asst. coach	Aug 24, 1956	1996	39 years, 331 days		
Father and a son	Azevedo	Tony Azevedo	D	Nov 21, 1981	2000	18 years, 307 days		
Father and a son	Azevedo	Ricardo Azevedo	Asst. coach	Aug 24, 1956	2004	47 years, 357 days	Father and son in an Olympic tournament	
Father and a son	Azevedo	Tony Azevedo	D	Nov 21, 1981	2004	22 years, 268 days	Father and son in an Olympic tournament	
Father and a son	Azevedo	Tony Azevedo	D	Nov 21, 1981	2008 (silver)	26 years, 263 days		
Father and a son	Azevedo	Tony Azevedo	D	Nov 21, 1981	2012	30 years, 251 days		
Father and a son	Azevedo	Tony Azevedo	D	Nov 21, 1981	2016	34 years, 259 days		

==== Father-daughter ====
Relation- ship	Family	Name	Pos	Birthdate	Games	Age	Note	Ref
Father and two daughters	Fischer	Erich Fischer	CB/U	Mar 12, 1966	1992	26 years, 142 days		
Father and two daughters	Fischer	Makenzie Fischer	CB	Mar 29, 1997	2016 (gold)	19 years, 133 days	Two sisters in an Olympic tournament	
Father and two daughters	Fischer	Aria Fischer	CF	Mar 2, 1999	2016 (gold)	17 years, 160 days	Two sisters in an Olympic tournament	

== See also ==
- United States men's Olympic water polo team statistics
  - United States men's Olympic water polo team statistics (matches played)
  - United States men's Olympic water polo team statistics (scorers)
  - United States men's Olympic water polo team statistics (goalkeepers)
  - United States men's Olympic water polo team statistics (medalists)
- List of United States men's Olympic water polo team rosters
- United States men's Olympic water polo team results
- United States men's national water polo team
