= United States men's Olympic water polo team statistics (goalkeepers) =

This article contains lists of goalkeepers for the United States men's national water polo team at the Summer Olympics, and is part of the United States men's Olympic water polo team statistics series. The lists are updated as of March 30, 2020.

== Abbreviations ==
No.	Cap number	Rk	Rank	App	Appearance	Ref	Reference
H	Handedness	L	Left-handed	R	Right-handed		
MP	Matches played	TMP	Total matches played				
SV	Saves	SH	Shots	EFF %	Efficiency (Saves per shot) %	SV/M	Saves per match

== By tournament ==
The following table is pre-sorted by edition of the Olympics (in ascending order), number of matches played (in descending order), Cap number or name of the goalkeeper (in ascending order), respectively.

Goalkeepers
Games	No.	Goalkeeper	H	Height	Birthdate	Age	MP	Note	Ref
1920		(Unknown)						Starting	
1920		(Unknown)						Reserve	
1924 (bronze)		Fred Lauer			Oct 13, 1898	25 years, 281 days	5	Starting	
1924 (bronze)		Elmer Collett			1903		0	Reserve	
1928		Harry Daniels			Jun 23, 1900	28 years, 49 days	3	Starting	
1928		John Cattus					0	Reserve	
1932 (bronze)		Herb Wildman			Sep 6, 1912	19 years, 340 days	4	Starting	
1936		Herb Wildman			Sep 6, 1912	23 years, 339 days	2	Starting	
1936		Fred Lauer			Oct 13, 1898	37 years, 302 days	1	Reserve	
1948		Ralph Budelman			Apr 19, 1918	30 years, 106 days	3	Starting	
1948		(Unknown)						Reserve	
1952		Harry Bisbey			May 10, 1931	21 years, 84 days	9	Starting	
1952		(Unknown)						Reserve	
1956		Robert Horn		6 ft 2.5 in (1.89 m)	Nov 1, 1931	25 years, 34 days	5	Starting	
1956		Ken Hahn		6 ft 0 in (1.83 m)	Jun 5, 1928	28 years, 183 days	1	Reserve	
1960		Robert Horn		6 ft 2.5 in (1.89 m)	Nov 1, 1931	28 years, 307 days	4	Starting	
1960		Gordie Hall		6 ft 0.5 in (1.84 m)	Nov 27, 1935	24 years, 281 days	3	Reserve	
1964	1	Tony van Dorp	R	6 ft 5 in (1.96 m)	Jun 25, 1936	28 years, 110 days	3	Starting	
1964	11	George Stransky	R	6 ft 2 in (1.88 m)	Jan 16, 1944	20 years, 271 days	1	Reserve	
1968	1	Tony van Dorp	R	6 ft 5 in (1.96 m)	Jun 25, 1936	32 years, 122 days	8	Starting	
1968	11	Steve Barnett		6 ft 3 in (1.91 m)	Jun 6, 1943	25 years, 141 days	8	Reserve	
1972 (bronze)	1	Jim Slatton		6 ft 2 in (1.88 m)	Jul 30, 1947	25 years, 36 days	9	Starting	
1972 (bronze)	9	Steve Barnett		6 ft 3 in (1.91 m)	Jun 6, 1943	29 years, 90 days	9	Reserve	
1980^{*}		Chris Dorst		6 ft 3.5 in (1.92 m)	Jun 5, 1956	24 years, 54 days	––		
1980^{*}		Steve Hamann					––		
1984 (silver)	1	Craig Wilson		6 ft 4.5 in (1.94 m)	Feb 5, 1957	27 years, 187 days	7	Starting	
1984 (silver)	13	Chris Dorst		6 ft 3.5 in (1.92 m)	Jun 5, 1956	28 years, 66 days	1	Reserve	
1988 (silver)	1	Craig Wilson		6 ft 4.5 in (1.94 m)	Feb 5, 1957	31 years, 239 days	7	Starting	
1988 (silver)	12	Chris Duplanty		6 ft 2.5 in (1.89 m)	Oct 21, 1965	22 years, 346 days	7	Reserve	
1992	1	Craig Wilson		6 ft 4.5 in (1.94 m)	Feb 5, 1957	35 years, 186 days	7	Starting	
1992	3	Chris Duplanty		6 ft 2.5 in (1.89 m)	Oct 21, 1965	26 years, 293 days	1	Reserve	
1996	1	Chris Duplanty		6 ft 2.5 in (1.89 m)	Oct 21, 1965	30 years, 281 days	8	Starting	
1996	2	Dan Hackett		6 ft 5.5 in (1.97 m)	Sep 11, 1970	25 years, 321 days	2	Reserve	
2000	1	Dan Hackett		6 ft 5.5 in (1.97 m)	Sep 11, 1970	30 years, 20 days	8	Starting	
2000	12	Sean Nolan		6 ft 5.5 in (1.97 m)	Jul 18, 1972	28 years, 75 days	1	Reserve	
2004	1	Brandon Brooks	R	6 ft 5.5 in (1.97 m)	Apr 29, 1981	23 years, 122 days	7	Starting	
2004	12	Genai Kerr		6 ft 7.5 in (2.02 m)	Dec 25, 1976	27 years, 248 days	1	Reserve	
2008 (silver)	1	Merrill Moses	R	6 ft 3 in (1.91 m)	Aug 13, 1977	31 years, 11 days	7	Starting	
2008 (silver)	13	Brandon Brooks	R	6 ft 5.5 in (1.97 m)	Apr 29, 1981	27 years, 117 days	2	Reserve	
2012	1	Merrill Moses	R	6 ft 3 in (1.91 m)	Aug 13, 1977	34 years, 365 days	8	Starting	
2012	13	Chay Lapin	R	6 ft 5.5 in (1.97 m)	Feb 25, 1987	25 years, 169 days	1	Reserve	
2016	1	Merrill Moses	R	6 ft 3 in (1.91 m)	Aug 13, 1977	39 years, 1 day	4	Starting	
2016	13	McQuin Baron	R	6 ft 8 in (2.03 m)	Oct 27, 1995	20 years, 292 days	3	Reserve	
Games	No.	Goalkeeper	H	Height	Birthdate	Age	MP	Note	Ref

^{*}Qualified but withdrew.

== Appearances ==
The following table is pre-sorted by number of Olympic appearances (in descending order), date of the last Olympic appearance (in ascending order), date of the first Olympic appearance (in ascending order), name of the goalkeeper (in ascending order), respectively.

Ten American goalkeepers have each made at least two Olympic appearances.

Craig Wilson is the first starting goalkeeper for the United States men's national team to have competed in three Olympic Games (1984–1992). He is the only starting goalkeeper to have won two Olympic medals (1984 (silver) , 1988 (silver) ).

Rk	Name	H	App	Games	Period	Birthdate	Age of first Olympic app	Age of last Olympic app	Ref
1	Craig Wilson		3	1984 (silver) , 1988 (silver) , 1992	8 years, 8 days	Feb 5, 1957	27 years, 178 days	35 years, 186 days	
1	Chris Duplanty		3	1988 (silver) , 1992, 1996	7 years, 311 days	Oct 21, 1965	22 years, 336 days	30 years, 281 days	
1	Merrill Moses	R	3	2008 (silver) , 2012, 2016	8 years, 4 days	Aug 13, 1977	30 years, 363 days	39 years, 1 day	
4	Fred Lauer		2	1924 (bronze) , 1936	12 years, 28 days	Oct 13, 1898	25 years, 274 days	37 years, 302 days	
4	Herb Wildman		2	1932 (bronze) , 1936	4 years, 4 days	Sep 6, 1912	19 years, 335 days	23 years, 339 days	
4	Robert Horn		2	1956, 1960	3 years, 280 days	Nov 1, 1931	25 years, 27 days	28 years, 307 days	
4	Tony van Dorp	R	2	1964, 1968	4 years, 14 days	Jun 25, 1936	28 years, 108 days	32 years, 122 days	
4	Steve Barnett		2	1968, 1972 (bronze)	3 years, 326 days	Jun 6, 1943	25 years, 130 days	29 years, 90 days	
4	Dan Hackett		2	1996, 2000	4 years, 73 days	Sep 11, 1970	25 years, 313 days	30 years, 20 days	
4	Brandon Brooks	R	2	2004, 2008 (silver)	4 years, 9 days	Apr 29, 1981	23 years, 108 days	27 years, 117 days	
11	Elmer Collett		1	1924 (bronze)	7 days	1903			
11	John Cattus		1	1928	5 days				
11	Harry Daniels		1	1928	5 days	Jun 23, 1900	28 years, 44 days	28 years, 49 days	
11	Ralph Budelman		1	1948	4 days	Apr 19, 1918	30 years, 102 days	30 years, 106 days	
11	Harry Bisbey		1	1952	8 days	May 10, 1931	21 years, 76 days	21 years, 84 days	
11	Ken Hahn		1	1956	7 days	Jun 5, 1928	28 years, 176 days	28 years, 183 days	
11	Gordie Hall		1	1960	8 days	Nov 27, 1935	24 years, 273 days	24 years, 281 days	
11	George Stransky	R	1	1964	2 days	Jan 16, 1944	20 years, 269 days	20 years, 271 days	
11	Jim Slatton		1	1972 (bronze)	8 days	Jul 30, 1947	25 years, 28 days	25 years, 36 days	
11	Chris Dorst		1	1984 (silver)	9 days	Jun 5, 1956	28 years, 57 days	28 years, 66 days	
11	Sean Nolan		1	2000	8 days	Jul 18, 1972	28 years, 67 days	28 years, 75 days	
11	Genai Kerr		1	2004	14 days	Dec 25, 1976	27 years, 234 days	27 years, 248 days	
11	Chay Lapin	R	1	2012	14 days	Feb 25, 1987	25 years, 155 days	25 years, 169 days	
11	McQuin Baron	R	1	2016	8 days	Oct 27, 1995	20 years, 284 days	20 years, 292 days	
Rk	Name	H	App	Games	Period	Birthdate	Age of first Olympic app	Age of last Olympic app	Ref

=== Historical progression – appearances of goalkeepers ===
The following table shows the historical progression of appearances of goalkeepers at the Olympic Games.

App	Achievement	Games	No.	Goalkeeper	H	Height	Date	Age	Duration of record	Ref
2	Set record	1936		Herb Wildman			Aug 8, 1936	23	55 years, 359 days	
2	Set record	1936		Fred Lauer			Aug 8, 1936	37	55 years, 359 days	
2	Tied record	1960		Robert Horn		6 ft 2.5 in (1.89 m)	Aug 26, 1960	28	55 years, 359 days	
2	Tied record	1968	1	Tony van Dorp	R	6 ft 5 in (1.96 m)	Oct 14, 1968	32	55 years, 359 days	
2	Tied record	1972 (bronze)	9	Steve Barnett		6 ft 3 in (1.91 m)	Aug 27, 1972	29	55 years, 359 days	
2	Tied record	1988 (silver)	1	Craig Wilson		6 ft 4.5 in (1.94 m)	Sep 21, 1988	31	55 years, 359 days	
3	Broke record	1992	1	Craig Wilson		6 ft 4.5 in (1.94 m)	Aug 1, 1992	35	32 years, 218 days	
3	Tied record	1996	1	Chris Duplanty		6 ft 2.5 in (1.89 m)	Jul 20, 1996	30	32 years, 218 days	
3	Tied record	2016	1	Merrill Moses	R	6 ft 3 in (1.91 m)	Aug 6, 2016	38	32 years, 218 days	

== Match played ==
=== Goalkeepers with at least one match played at the Olympics ===
The following table is pre-sorted by number of total matches played (in descending order), edition of the Olympics (in ascending order), name of the goalkeeper (in ascending order), respectively.

Craig Wilson is the American goalkeeper with the most matches played at the Olympic Games.

Goalkeepers with at least one match played at the Olympics
Rk	Goalkeeper	Games (matches played)	TMP	H	Height	Ref
1	Craig Wilson	1984 (7) (silver) , 1988 (7) (silver) , 1992 (7)	21		6 ft 4.5 in (1.94 m)	
2	Merrill Moses	2008 (7) (silver) , 2012 (8), 2016 (4)	19	R	6 ft 3 in (1.91 m)	
3	Steve Barnett	1968 (8), 1972 (9) (bronze)	17		6 ft 3 in (1.91 m)	
4	Chris Duplanty	1988 (7) (silver) , 1992 (1), 1996 (8)	16		6 ft 2.5 in (1.89 m)	
5	Tony van Dorp	1964 (3), 1968 (8)	11	R	6 ft 5 in (1.96 m)	
6	Dan Hackett	1996 (2), 2000 (8)	10		6 ft 5.5 in (1.97 m)	
7	Harry Bisbey	1952 (9)	9			
7	Robert Horn	1956 (5), 1960 (4)	9		6 ft 2.5 in (1.89 m)	
7	Jim Slatton	1972 (9) (bronze)	9		6 ft 2 in (1.88 m)	
7	Brandon Brooks	2004 (7), 2008 (2) (silver)	9	R	6 ft 5.5 in (1.97 m)	
11	Fred Lauer	1924 (5) (bronze) , 1936 (1)	6			
11	Herb Wildman	1932 (4) (bronze) , 1936 (2)	6			
13	Harry Daniels	1928 (3)	3			
13	Ralph Budelman	1948 (3)	3			
13	Gordie Hall	1960 (3)	3		6 ft 0.5 in (1.84 m)	
13	McQuin Baron	2016 (3)	3	R	6 ft 8 in (2.03 m)	
17	Ken Hahn	1956 (1)	1		6 ft 0 in (1.83 m)	
17	George Stransky	1964 (1)	1	R	6 ft 2 in (1.88 m)	
17	Chris Dorst	1984 (1) (silver)	1		6 ft 3.5 in (1.92 m)	
17	Sean Nolan	2000 (1)	1		6 ft 5.5 in (1.97 m)	
17	Genai Kerr	2004 (1)	1		6 ft 7.5 in (2.02 m)	
17	Chay Lapin	2012 (1)	1	R	6 ft 5.5 in (1.97 m)	
Rk	Goalkeeper	Games (matches played)	TMP	H	Height	Ref

==== Historical progression – total matches played by goalkeepers ====
The following table shows the historical progression of the record of total matches played by goalkeepers at the Olympic Games.

TMP	Achievement	Games	No.	Goalkeeper	H	Height	Date	Age	Duration of record	Ref
5	Set record	1924 (bronze)		Fred Lauer			Jul 20, 1924	25	12 years, 20 days	
6	Broke record	1936		Herb Wildman			Aug 9, 1936	23	15 years, 359 days	
6	Tied record	1936		Fred Lauer			Aug 10, 1936	37	15 years, 359 days	
9	Broke record	1952		Harry Bisbey			Aug 2, 1952	21	16 years, 84 days	
9	Tied record	1960		Robert Horn		6 ft 2.5 in (1.89 m)	Sep 2, 1960	28	16 years, 84 days	
11	Broke record	1968	1	Tony van Dorp	R	6 ft 5 in (1.96 m)	Oct 25, 1968	32	3 years, 315 days	
17	Broke record	1972 (bronze)	1	Jim Slatton		6 ft 2 in (1.88 m)	Sep 4, 1972	29	19 years, 340 days	
21	Broke record	1992	1	Craig Wilson		6 ft 4.5 in (1.94 m)	Aug 9, 1992	35	32 years, 210 days	

=== Goalkeepers with at least one match played in an Olympic tournament ===
The following table is pre-sorted by number of matches played (in descending order), edition of the Olympics (in ascending order), Cap number or name of the goalkeeper (in ascending order), respectively.

Goalkeepers with at least one match played in an Olympic tournament
Rk	Goalkeeper	Games	No.	MP	H	Height	Age	Ref
1	Harry Bisbey	1952		9			21	
1	Jim Slatton	1972 (bronze)	1	9		6 ft 2 in (1.88 m)	25	
1	Steve Barnett	1972 (bronze)	9	9		6 ft 3 in (1.91 m)	29	
4	Tony van Dorp	1968	1	8	R	6 ft 5 in (1.96 m)	32	
4	Steve Barnett	1968	11	8		6 ft 3 in (1.91 m)	25	
4	Chris Duplanty	1996	1	8		6 ft 2.5 in (1.89 m)	30	
4	Dan Hackett	2000	1	8		6 ft 5.5 in (1.97 m)	30	
4	Merrill Moses	2012	1	8	R	6 ft 3 in (1.91 m)	34	
9	Craig Wilson	1984 (silver)	1	7		6 ft 4.5 in (1.94 m)	27	
9	Craig Wilson	1988 (silver)	1	7		6 ft 4.5 in (1.94 m)	31	
9	Chris Duplanty	1988 (silver)	12	7		6 ft 2.5 in (1.89 m)	22	
9	Craig Wilson	1992	1	7		6 ft 4.5 in (1.94 m)	35	
9	Brandon Brooks	2004	1	7	R	6 ft 5.5 in (1.97 m)	23	
9	Merrill Moses	2008 (silver)	1	7	R	6 ft 3 in (1.91 m)	31	
15	Fred Lauer	1924 (bronze)		5			25	
15	Robert Horn	1956		5		6 ft 2.5 in (1.89 m)	25	
17	Herb Wildman	1932 (bronze)		4			19	
17	Robert Horn	1960		4		6 ft 2.5 in (1.89 m)	28	
17	Merrill Moses	2016	1	4	R	6 ft 3 in (1.91 m)	39	
20	Harry Daniels	1928		3			28	
20	Ralph Budelman	1948		3			30	
20	Gordie Hall	1960		3		6 ft 0.5 in (1.84 m)	24	
20	Tony van Dorp	1964	1	3	R	6 ft 5 in (1.96 m)	28	
20	McQuin Baron	2016	13	3	R	6 ft 8 in (2.03 m)	20	
25	Herb Wildman	1936		2			23	
25	Dan Hackett	1996	2	2		6 ft 5.5 in (1.97 m)	25	
25	Brandon Brooks	2008 (silver)	13	2	R	6 ft 5.5 in (1.97 m)	27	
28	Fred Lauer	1936		1			37	
28	Ken Hahn	1956		1		6 ft 0 in (1.83 m)	28	
28	George Stransky	1964	11	1	R	6 ft 2 in (1.88 m)	20	
28	Chris Dorst	1984 (silver)	13	1		6 ft 3.5 in (1.92 m)	28	
28	Chris Duplanty	1992	3	1		6 ft 2.5 in (1.89 m)	26	
28	Sean Nolan	2000	12	1		6 ft 5.5 in (1.97 m)	28	
28	Genai Kerr	2004	12	1		6 ft 7.5 in (2.02 m)	27	
28	Chay Lapin	2012	13	1	R	6 ft 5.5 in (1.97 m)	25	
Rk	Goalkeeper	Games	No.	MP	H	Height	Age	Ref

== Shots saved and efficiency ==
The following table is pre-sorted by edition of the Olympics (in ascending order), Cap number or name of the goalkeeper (in ascending order), respectively.

Shots saved and efficiency
Games	No.	Goalkeeper	SV	SH	EFF %	MP	SV/M	H	Height	Age	Ref
1996	1	Chris Duplanty	77	132	58.30%	8	9.625		6 ft 2.5 in (1.89 m)	30	
1996	2	Dan Hackett	1	3	33.30%	2	0.500		6 ft 5.5 in (1.97 m)	25	
2000	1	Dan Hackett	70	135	51.90%	8	8.750		6 ft 5.5 in (1.97 m)	30	
2000	12	Sean Nolan	2	5	40.00%	1	2.000		6 ft 5.5 in (1.97 m)	28	
2004	1	Brandon Brooks	58	108	53.70%	7	8.286	R	6 ft 5.5 in (1.97 m)	23	
2004	12	Genai Kerr	0	0	––	1	0.000		6 ft 7.5 in (2.02 m)	27	
2008 (silver)	1	Merrill Moses	70	117	59.80%	7	10.000	R	6 ft 3 in (1.91 m)	31	
2008 (silver)	13	Brandon Brooks	4	7	57.10%	2	2.000	R	6 ft 5.5 in (1.97 m)	27	
2012	1	Merrill Moses	72	135	53.30%	8	9.000	R	6 ft 3 in (1.91 m)	34	
2012	13	Chay Lapin	8	15	53.30%	1	8.000	R	6 ft 5.5 in (1.97 m)	25	
2016	1	Merrill Moses	30	52	57.70%	4	7.500	R	6 ft 3 in (1.91 m)	39	
2016	13	McQuin Baron	19	32	59.40%	3	6.333	R	6 ft 8 in (2.03 m)	20	
Games	No.	Goalkeeper	SV	SH	EFF %	MP	SV/M	H	Height	Age	Ref

== See also ==
- United States men's Olympic water polo team statistics
  - United States men's Olympic water polo team statistics (appearances)
  - United States men's Olympic water polo team statistics (matches played)
  - United States men's Olympic water polo team statistics (scorers)
  - United States men's Olympic water polo team statistics (medalists)
- List of United States men's Olympic water polo team rosters
- United States men's Olympic water polo team results
- United States men's national water polo team
