= United States men's Olympic water polo team results =

This article contains lists of results of the United States men's national water polo team at the Summer Olympics. The lists are updated as of March 30, 2020.

== Basics ==
Men's water polo tournaments have been staged at the Olympic Games since 1900. The United States has participated in 22 of 27 tournaments. The United States team is the only non-European squad to win medals in the men's Olympic water polo tournament.

Best results:

- 1st place ( (gold) Gold medal):
  - (United States) 1904 St. Louis
- 2nd place ( (silver) Silver medal):
  - (United States) 1904 St. Louis
  - (United States) 1984 Los Angeles
  - (South Korea) 1988 Seoul
  - (China) 2008 Beijing
- 3rd place ( (bronze) Bronze medal):
  - (United States) 1904 St. Louis
  - (France) 1924 Paris
  - (United States) 1932 Los Angeles
  - (West Germany) 1972 Munich

Latest medal:

- (silver) Silver medal (2nd place): (China) 2008 Beijing

== Results ==
=== 1900 Summer Olympics ===
- Number of participating nations: 4
- Host city: (France) Paris
- Final Ranking: Did not participate

=== 1904 Summer Olympics ===
- Number of participating nations: 1
- Host city: (United States) St. Louis
- Final Ranking:
  - New York Athletic Club (NYAC): 1st place ( (gold) Gold medal)
  - Chicago Athletic Association (CAA): 2nd place ( (silver) Silver medal)
  - Missouri Athletic Club (MAC): 3rd place ( (bronze) Bronze medal)

Match #	Round	Date	Result	Notes	Ref
Match 1/2	Semi-Finals	Sep 5, 1904	NYAC 5–0 CAA		
Match 2/2	Final Round	Sep 6, 1904	NYAC 6–0 MAC		

=== 1908 Summer Olympics ===
- Number of participating nations: 4
- Host city: (United Kingdom) London
- Final Ranking: Did not participate

=== 1912 Summer Olympics ===
- Number of participating nations: 6
- Host city: (Sweden) Stockholm
- Final Ranking: Did not participate

=== 1920 Summer Olympics ===
- Number of participating nations: 12
- Host city: (Belgium) Antwerp
- Final Ranking: 4th place

Match #	Round	Date	Opponent	Result	Goals			Ref
Match #	Round	Date	Opponent	Result	For	Against	Diff.	Ref
Match 1/5	Quarter-Finals	Aug 24, 1920	Greece	Won	7	0	7	
Match 2/5	Semi-Finals	Aug 26, 1920	Great Britain	Lost	2	7	-5	
Match 3/5	Second-Place Tournament	Aug 28, 1920	Spain	Won	5	0	5	
Match 4/5	Second-Place Tournament	Aug 28, 1920	Belgium	Lost	2	7	-5	
Match 5/5	Third-Place Tournament	Aug 29, 1920	Sweden	Lost	2	5	-3	

=== 1924 Summer Olympics ===
- Number of participating nations: 13
- Host city: (France) Paris
- Final Ranking: 3rd place ( (bronze) Bronze medal)

Match #	Round	Date	Opponent	Result	Goals			Ref
Match #	Round	Date	Opponent	Result	For	Against	Diff.	Ref
Match 1/5	Round One	Jul 13, 1924	France	Lost	1	3	-2	
Match 2/5	Second-Place Tournament	Jul 18, 1924	Netherlands	Won	4	2	2	
Match 3/5	Second-Place Tournament	Jul 19, 1924	Belgium	Lost	1	2	-1	
Match 4/5	Second-Place Tournament	Jul 20, 1924	Belgium	Lost	1	2	-1	
Match 5/5	Third-Place Tournament	Jul 20, 1924	Sweden	Won	3	2	1	

=== 1928 Summer Olympics ===
- Number of participating nations: 14
- Host city: (Netherlands) Amsterdam
- Final Ranking: 7th place

Match #	Round	Date	Opponent	Result	Goals			Ref
Match #	Round	Date	Opponent	Result	For	Against	Diff.	Ref
Match 1/3	Quarter-Finals	Aug 6, 1928	Hungary	Lost	0	5	-5	
Match 2/3	Third-Place Tournament	Aug 8, 1928	Malta	Won	10	0	10	
Match 3/3	Third-Place Tournament	Aug 11, 1928	France	Lost	1	2	-1	

=== 1932 Summer Olympics ===
- Number of participating nations: 5
- Host city: (United States) Los Angeles
- Final Ranking: 3rd place ( (bronze) Bronze medal)

Match #	Round	Date	Opponent	Result	Goals			Ref
Match #	Round	Date	Opponent	Result	For	Against	Diff.	Ref
Match 1/4	Round-Robin	Aug 6, 1932	Brazil	Won	6	1	5	
Match 2/4	Round-Robin	Aug 7, 1932	Japan	Won	10	0	10	
Match 3/4	Round-Robin	Aug 9, 1932	Germany	Ties	4	4	0	
Match 4/4	Round-Robin	Aug 11, 1932	Hungary	Lost	0	7	-7	

=== 1936 Summer Olympics ===
- Number of participating nations: 16
- Host city: (Germany) Berlin
- Final Ranking: 9th place

Match #	Round	Date	Opponent	Result	Goals			Ref
Match #	Round	Date	Opponent	Result	For	Against	Diff.	Ref
Match 1/3	Group A	Aug 8, 1936	Netherlands	Lost	2	3	-1	
Match 2/3	Group A	Aug 9, 1936	Uruguay	Won	2	1	1	
Match 3/3	Group A	Aug 10, 1936	Belgium	Lost	3	4	-1	

=== 1948 Summer Olympics ===
- Number of participating nations: 18
- Host city: (United Kingdom) London
- Final Ranking: 11th place

Match #	Round	Date	Opponent	Result	Goals			Ref
Match #	Round	Date	Opponent	Result	For	Against	Diff.	Ref
Match 1/3	Group A	Jul 30, 1948	Uruguay	Won	7	0	7	
Match 2/3	Group A	Jul 31, 1948	Belgium	Ties	4	4	0	
Match 3/3	Group A	Aug 3, 1948	Sweden	Lost	0	7	-7	

=== 1952 Summer Olympics ===
- Number of participating nations: 21
- Host city: (Finland) Helsinki
- Final Ranking: 4th place

Match #	Round	Date	Opponent	Result	Goals			Ref
Match #	Round	Date	Opponent	Result	For	Against	Diff.	Ref
Match 1/9	Qualifying Round	Jul 25, 1952	Sweden	Lost	1	5	-4	
Match 2/9	Qualifying Round	Jul 26, 1952	Romania	Won	6	3	3	
Match 3/9	Group A	Jul 27, 1952	Great Britain	Won	8	3	5	
Match 4/9	Group A	Jul 28, 1952	Italy	Lost	4	5	-1	
Match 5/9	Group A	Jul 29, 1952	Austria	Won	4	1	3	
Match 6/9	Group A	Jul 30, 1952	Belgium	Won	4	2	2	
Match 7/9	Group A	Jul 31, 1952	Spain	Won	6	4	2	
Match 8/9	Final Round	Aug 1, 1952	Yugoslavia	Lost	2	4	-2	
Match 9/9	Final Round	Aug 2, 1952	Hungary	Lost	0	4	-4	

=== 1956 Summer Olympics ===
- Number of participating nations: 10
- Host city: (Australia) Melbourne
- Final Ranking: 5th place

Match #	Round	Date	Opponent	Result	Goals			Ref
Match #	Round	Date	Opponent	Result	For	Against	Diff.	Ref
Match 1/6	Group B	Nov 28, 1956	Great Britain	Won	5	3	2	
Match 2/6	Group B	Nov 30, 1956	Hungary	Lost	2	6	-4	
Match 3/6	Final Round	Dec 1, 1956	Yugoslavia	Lost	1	5	-4	
Match 4/6	Final Round	Dec 3, 1956	Germany	Won	4	3	1	
Match 5/6	Final Round	Dec 4, 1956	Italy	Lost	2	3	-1	
Match 6/6	Final Round	Dec 5, 1956	Soviet Union	Lost	1	3	-2	

=== 1960 Summer Olympics ===
- Number of participating nations: 16
- Host city: (Italy) Rome
- Final Ranking: 7th place

Match #	Round	Date	Opponent	Result	Goals			Ref
Match #	Round	Date	Opponent	Result	For	Against	Diff.	Ref
Match 1/7	Group D	Aug 26, 1960	Hungary	Lost	2	7	-5	
Match 2/7	Group D	Aug 27, 1960	France	Won	10	4	6	
Match 3/7	Group D	Aug 29, 1960	Belgium	Won	5	2	3	
Match 4/7	Semifinal Round	Aug 31, 1960	Yugoslavia	Lost	2	6	-4	
Match 5/7	Semifinal Round	Sep 1, 1960	Netherlands	Won	7	6	1	
Match 6/7	Classification Round 5-8	Sep 2, 1960	Germany	Lost	3	4	-1	
Match 7/7	Classification Round 5-8	Sep 3, 1960	Romania	Lost	4	6	-2	

=== 1964 Summer Olympics ===
- Number of participating nations: 13
- Host city: (Japan) Tokyo
- Final Ranking: 9th place

Match #	Round	Date	Opponent	Result	Goals			Ref
Match #	Round	Date	Opponent	Result	For	Against	Diff.	Ref
Match 1/3	Group C	Oct 11, 1964	Yugoslavia	Lost	1	2	-1	
Match 2/3	Group C	Oct 12, 1964	Brazil	Won	7	1	6	
Match 3/3	Group C	Oct 13, 1964	Netherlands	Lost	4	6	-2	

=== 1968 Summer Olympics ===
- Number of participating nations: 15
- Host city: Mexico City
- Final Ranking: 5th place

Match #	Round	Date	Opponent	Result	Goals			Ref
Match #	Round	Date	Opponent	Result	For	Against	Diff.	Ref
Match 1/8	Group A	Oct 14, 1968	Brazil	Won	10	5	5	
Match 2/8	Group A	Oct 16, 1968	Spain	Won	10	7	3	
Match 3/8	Group A	Oct 17, 1968	Cuba	Ties	6	6	0	
Match 4/8	Group A	Oct 19, 1968	Hungary	Lost	1	5	-4	
Match 5/8	Group A	Oct 21, 1968	Soviet Union	Lost	3	8	-5	
Match 6/8	Group A	Oct 22, 1968	West Germany	Won	7	5	2	
Match 7/8	Classification Round 5-8	Oct 24, 1968	Netherlands	Won	6	3	3	
Match 8/8	Final Round	Oct 25, 1968	East Germany	Won	6	4	2	

=== 1972 Summer Olympics ===
- Number of participating nations: 16
- Host city: (West Germany) Munich
- Final Ranking: 3rd place ( (bronze) Bronze medal)

Match #	Round	Date	Opponent	Result	Goals			Ref
Match #	Round	Date	Opponent	Result	For	Against	Diff.	Ref
Match 1/9	Group A	Aug 27, 1972	Romania	Won	4	3	1	
Match 2/9	Group A	Aug 28, 1972	Cuba	Won	7	6	1	
Match 3/9	Group A	Aug 29, 1972	Canada	Won	8	1	7	
Match 4/9	Group A	Aug 30, 1972	Mexico	Won	7	5	2	
Match 5/9	Group A	Aug 31, 1972	Yugoslavia	Won	5	3	2	
Match 6/9	Final Round	Sep 1, 1972	West Germany	Ties	4	4	0	
Match 7/9	Final Round	Sep 2, 1972	Hungary	Lost	3	5	-2	
Match 8/9	Final Round	Sep 3, 1972	Soviet Union	Ties	6	6	0	
Match 9/9	Final Round	Sep 4, 1972	Italy	Won	6	5	1	

=== 1976 Summer Olympics ===
- Number of participating nations: 12
- Host city: (Canada) Montreal
- Final Ranking: Did not qualify

=== 1980 Summer Olympics ===
- Number of participating nations: 12
- Host city: (Soviet Union) Moscow
- Final Ranking: Qualified but withdrew

=== 1984 Summer Olympics ===
- Number of participating nations: 12
- Host city: (United States) Los Angeles
- Final Ranking: 2nd place ( (silver) Silver medal)

Match #	Round	Date	Opponent	Result	Goals			Ref
Match #	Round	Date	Opponent	Result	For	Against	Diff.	Ref
Match 1/7	Group B	Aug 1, 1984	Greece	Won	12	5	7	
Match 2/7	Group B	Aug 2, 1984	Brazil	Won	10	4	6	
Match 3/7	Group B	Aug 3, 1984	Spain	Won	10	8	2	
Match 4/7	Final Round	Aug 6, 1984	Netherlands	Won	8	7	1	
Match 5/7	Final Round	Aug 7, 1984	Australia	Won	12	7	5	
Match 6/7	Final Round	Aug 9, 1984	West Germany	Won	8	7	1	
Match 7/7	Final Round	Aug 10, 1984	Yugoslavia	Ties	5	5	0	

=== 1988 Summer Olympics ===
- Number of participating nations: 12
- Host city: (South Korea) Seoul
- Final Ranking: 2nd place ( (silver) Silver medal)

Match #	Round	Date	Opponent	Result	Goals			Ref
Match #	Round	Date	Opponent	Result	For	Against	Diff.	Ref
Match 1/7	Group B	Sep 21, 1988	Yugoslavia	Won	7	6	1	
Match 2/7	Group B	Sep 22, 1988	Spain	Lost	7	9	-2	
Match 3/7	Group B	Sep 23, 1988	China	Won	14	7	7	
Match 4/7	Group B	Sep 26, 1988	Greece	Won	18	9	9	
Match 5/7	Group B	Sep 27, 1988	Hungary	Won	10	9	1	
Match 6/7	Semi-Finals	Sep 30, 1988	Soviet Union	Won	8	7	1	
Match 7/7	Final Round	Oct 1, 1988	Yugoslavia	Lost	7	9	-2	

=== 1992 Summer Olympics ===
- Number of participating nations: 12
- Host city: (Spain) Barcelona
- Final Ranking: 4th place

Match #	Round	Date	Opponent	Result	Goals			Ref
Match #	Round	Date	Opponent	Result	For	Against	Diff.	Ref
Match 1/7	Group A	Aug 1, 1992	Australia	Won	8	4	4	
Match 2/7	Group A	Aug 2, 1992	Czechoslovakia	Won	9	3	6	
Match 3/7	Group A	Aug 3, 1992	France	Won	11	7	4	
Match 4/7	Group A	Aug 5, 1992	Unified Team	Lost	5	8	-3	
Match 5/7	Group A	Aug 6, 1992	Germany	Won	7	2	5	
Match 6/7	Semi-Finals	Aug 8, 1992	Spain	Lost	4	6	-2	
Match 7/7	Final Round	Aug 9, 1992	Unified Team	Lost	4	8	-4	

=== 1996 Summer Olympics ===
- Number of participating nations: 12
- Host city: (United States) Atlanta
- Final Ranking: 7th place

Match #	Round	Date	Opponent	Result	Goals			Ref
Match #	Round	Date	Opponent	Result	For	Against	Diff.	Ref
Match 1/8	Group B	Jul 20, 1996	Italy	Lost	7	10	-3	
Match 2/8	Group B	Jul 21, 1996	Greece	Won	9	7	2	
Match 3/8	Group B	Jul 22, 1996	Ukraine	Won	9	7	2	
Match 4/8	Group B	Jul 23, 1996	Romania	Won	10	5	5	
Match 5/8	Group B	Jul 24, 1996	Croatia	Won	10	8	2	
Match 6/8	Quarter-Finals	Jul 26, 1996	Spain	Lost	4	5	-1	
Match 7/8	Classification Round 5-8	Jul 27, 1996	Greece	Lost	6	7	-1	
Match 8/8	Final Round	Jul 28, 1996	Serbia and Montenegro	Won	12	8	4	

=== 2000 Summer Olympics ===
- Number of participating nations: 12
- Host city: (Australia) Sydney
- Final Ranking: 6th place

Match #	Round	Date	Opponent	Result	Goals			Ref
Match #	Round	Date	Opponent	Result	For	Against	Diff.	Ref
Match 1/8	Group B	Sep 23, 2000	Croatia	Lost	7	10	-3	
Match 2/8	Group B	Sep 24, 2000	Serbia and Montenegro	Lost	5	8	-3	
Match 3/8	Group B	Sep 25, 2000	Netherlands	Won	12	8	4	
Match 4/8	Group B	Sep 26, 2000	Hungary	Lost	9	10	-1	
Match 5/8	Group B	Sep 27, 2000	Greece	Won	9	3	6	
Match 6/8	Quarter-Finals	Sep 29, 2000	Russia	Lost	10	11	-1	
Match 7/8	Classification Round 5-8	Sep 30, 2000	Croatia	Won	9	8	1	
Match 8/8	Final Round	Oct 1, 2000	Italy	Lost	8	10	-2	

=== 2004 Summer Olympics ===
- Number of participating nations: 12
- Host city: (Greece) Athens
- Final Ranking: 7th place

Match #	Round	Date	Opponent	Result	Goals			Ref
Match #	Round	Date	Opponent	Result	For	Against	Diff.	Ref
Match 1/7	Group A	Aug 15, 2004	Croatia	Won	7	6	1	
Match 2/7	Group A	Aug 17, 2004	Kazakhstan	Won	9	6	3	
Match 3/7	Group A	Aug 19, 2004	Hungary	Lost	5	7	-2	
Match 4/7	Group A	Aug 21, 2004	Russia	Lost	7	9	-2	
Match 5/7	Group A	Aug 23, 2004	Serbia and Montenegro	Lost	4	9	-5	
Match 6/7	Classification Round 7-10	Aug 27, 2004	Australia	Won	6	5	1	
Match 7/7	Final Round	Aug 29, 2004	Italy	Won	9	8	1	

=== 2008 Summer Olympics ===
- Number of participating nations: 12
- Host city: (China) Beijing
- Final Ranking: 2nd place ( (silver) Silver medal)

Match #	Round	Date	Opponent	Result	Goals			Ref
Match #	Round	Date	Opponent	Result	For	Against	Diff.	Ref
Match 1/7	Group B	Aug 10, 2008	China	Won	8	4	4	
Match 2/7	Group B	Aug 12, 2008	Italy	Won	12	11	1	
Match 3/7	Group B	Aug 14, 2008	Serbia	Lost	2	4	-2	
Match 4/7	Group B	Aug 16, 2008	Croatia	Won	7	5	2	
Match 5/7	Group B	Aug 18, 2008	Germany	Won	8	7	1	
Match 6/7	Semi-Finals	Aug 22, 2008	Serbia	Won	10	5	5	
Match 7/7	Final Round	Aug 24, 2008	Hungary	Lost	10	14	-4	

=== 2012 Summer Olympics ===
- Number of participating nations: 12
- Host city: (United Kingdom) London
- Final Ranking: 8th place

Match #	Round	Date	Opponent	Result	Goals			Ref
Match #	Round	Date	Opponent	Result	For	Against	Diff.	Ref
Match 1/8	Group B	Jul 29, 2012	Montenegro	Won	8	7	1	
Match 2/8	Group B	Jul 31, 2012	Romania	Won	10	8	2	
Match 3/8	Group B	Aug 2, 2012	Great Britain	Won	13	7	6	
Match 4/8	Group B	Aug 4, 2012	Serbia	Lost	6	11	-5	
Match 5/8	Group B	Aug 6, 2012	Hungary	Lost	6	11	-5	
Match 6/8	Quarter-Finals	Aug 8, 2012	Croatia	Lost	2	8	-6	
Match 7/8	Classification Round 5-8	Aug 10, 2012	Spain	Lost	7	8	-1	
Match 8/8	Final Round	Aug 12, 2012	Australia	Lost	9	10	-1	

=== 2016 Summer Olympics ===
- Number of participating nations: 12
- Host city: (Brazil) Rio de Janeiro
- Final Ranking: 10th place

Match #	Round	Date	Opponent	Result	Goals			Ref
Match #	Round	Date	Opponent	Result	For	Against	Diff.	Ref
Match 1/5	Group B	Aug 6, 2016	Croatia	Lost	5	7	-2	
Match 2/5	Group B	Aug 8, 2016	Spain	Lost	9	10	-1	
Match 3/5	Group B	Aug 10, 2016	France	Won	6	3	3	
Match 4/5	Group B	Aug 12, 2016	Montenegro	Lost	5	8	-3	
Match 5/5	Group B	Aug 14, 2016	Italy	Won	10	7	3	

== Statistics ==
=== By tournament ===
The following table shows results of the United States men's national water polo team at the Olympic Games by tournament.

Games	MP	W	D	L	GF	GA	GD	Win %	Finish	Ref
(France) 1900 Paris	Did not participate									
(United States) 1904 St. Louis	See Water polo at the 1904 Summer Olympics									
(United Kingdom) 1908 London	Did not participate									
(Sweden) 1912 Stockholm	Did not participate									
(Belgium) 1920 Antwerp	5	2	0	3	18	19	-1	40.00%	4th of 12	
(France) 1924 Paris	5	2	0	3	10	11	-1	40.00%	**3rd** of 13	
(Netherlands) 1928 Amsterdam	3	1	0	2	11	7	+4	33.33%	7th of 14	
(United States) 1932 Los Angeles	4	2	1	1	20	12	+8	50.00%	**3rd** of 5	
(Germany) 1936 Berlin	3	1	0	2	7	8	-1	33.33%	9th of 16	
(United Kingdom) 1948 London	3	1	1	1	11	11	0	33.33%	11th of 18	
(Finland) 1952 Helsinki	9	5	0	4	35	31	+4	55.56%	4th of 21	
(Australia) 1956 Melbourne	6	2	0	4	15	23	-8	33.33%	5th of 10	
(Italy) 1960 Rome	7	3	0	4	33	35	-2	42.86%	7th of 16	
(Japan) 1964 Tokyo	3	1	0	2	12	9	+3	33.33%	9th of 13	
1968 Mexico City	8	5	1	2	49	43	+6	62.50%	5th of 15	
(West Germany) 1972 Munich	9	6	2	1	50	38	+12	66.67%	**3rd** of 16	
(Canada) 1976 Montreal	Did not qualify									
(Soviet Union) 1980 Moscow	Qualified but withdrew									
(United States) 1984 Los Angeles	7	6	1	0	65	43	+22	85.71%	**2nd** of 12	
(South Korea) 1988 Seoul	7	5	0	2	71	56	+15	71.43%	**2nd** of 12	
(Spain) 1992 Barcelona	7	4	0	3	48	38	+10	57.14%	4th of 12	
(United States) 1996 Atlanta	8	5	0	3	67	57	+10	62.50%	7th of 12	
(Australia) 2000 Sydney	8	3	0	5	69	68	+1	37.50%	6th of 12	
(Greece) 2004 Athens	7	4	0	3	47	50	-3	57.14%	7th of 12	
(China) 2008 Beijing	7	5	0	2	57	50	+7	71.43%	**2nd** of 12	
(United Kingdom) 2012 London	8	3	0	5	61	70	-9	37.50%	8th of 12	
(Brazil) 2016 Rio de Janeiro	5	2	0	3	35	35	0	40.00%	10th of 12	
Total	129	68	6	55	791	714	+77	52.71%		
Games	MP	W	D	L	GF	GA	GD	Win %	Finish	Ref

==== Historical progression of the best finish ====
The following table shows the historical progression of the best finish at the Olympic Games, excluding the medal sweep by U.S. teams at the 1904 St. Louis Olympics.

Best finish	Achievement	Games	Date	Duration of record	Ref
4th	**Set record**	(Belgium) 1920 Antwerp	Aug 29, 1920	3 years, 326 days	
3rd	**Broke record**	(France) 1924 Paris	Jul 20, 1924	60 years, 21 days	
3rd	Tied record	(United States) 1932 Los Angeles	Aug 13, 1932	60 years, 21 days	
3rd	Tied record	(West Germany) 1972 Munich	Sep 4, 1972	60 years, 21 days	
2nd	**Broke record**	(United States) 1984 Los Angeles	Aug 10, 1984	42 years, 52 days	
2nd	Tied record	(South Korea) 1988 Seoul	Oct 1, 1988	42 years, 52 days	
2nd	Tied record	(China) 2008 Beijing	Aug 24, 2008	42 years, 52 days	

=== By opponent ===
The following tables show results of the United States men's national water polo team at the Olympic Games by opponent.

Continent	Medals	First	Latest	MP	W	D	L	GF	GA	GD	Win %	Confederation
Teams from Americas	0	1936	1984	10	9	1	0	70	30	+40	90.00%	ASUA
Teams from Asia	0	1932	2008	4	4	0	0	41	17	+24	100.00%	AASF
Teams from Europe	73	1920	2016	111	52	5	54	645	641	+4	46.85%	LEN
Teams from Oceania	0	1984	2012	4	3	0	1	35	26	+9	75.00%	OSA
Total	73	1920	2016	129	68	6	55	791	714	+77	52.71%	

Team	Medals	First	Latest	MP	W	D	L	GF	GA	GD	Win %	Confederation
Australia	0	1984	2012	4	3	0	1	35	26	+9	75.00%	OSA
Austria	0	1952	1952	1	1	0	0	4	1	+3	100.00%	LEN
**Belgium**^{^}	6	1920	1932	7	2	1	4	20	23	-3	28.57%	LEN
Brazil	0	1964	1984	4	4	0	0	33	11	+22	100.00%	ASUA
Canada	0	1972	1972	1	1	0	0	8	1	+7	100.00%	ASUA
China	0	1988	2008	2	2	0	0	22	11	+11	100.00%	AASF
**Croatia**^{^}	3	1996	2016	7	4	0	3	47	52	-5	57.14%	LEN
Cuba	0	1968	1972	2	1	1	0	13	12	+1	50.00%	ASUA
Czechoslovakia^{†}	0	1992	1992	1	1	0	0	9	3	+6	100.00%	LEN
East Germany^{†}	0	1968	1968	1	1	0	0	6	4	+2	100.00%	LEN
**France**^{^}	4	1924	2016	5	3	0	2	29	19	+10	60.00%	LEN
**Germany**^{^}	3	1932	2008	5	3	1	1	26	20	+6	60.00%	LEN
**Great Britain**^{^}	4	1920	2012	4	3	0	1	28	20	+8	75.00%	LEN
Greece	0	1920	2000	6	5	0	1	61	31	+30	83.33%	LEN
**Hungary**^{^}	15	1928	2012	12	1	0	11	48	90	-42	8.33%	LEN
**Italy**^{^}	8	1952	2016	8	4	0	4	58	59	-1	50.00%	LEN
Japan	0	1932	1932	1	1	0	0	10	0	+10	100.00%	AASF
Kazakhstan	0	2004	2004	1	1	0	0	9	6	+3	100.00%	AASF
Malta	0	1928	1928	1	1	0	0	10	0	+10	100.00%	LEN
Mexico	0	1972	1972	1	1	0	0	7	5	+2	100.00%	ASUA
Montenegro	0	2012	2016	2	1	0	1	13	15	-2	50.00%	LEN
**Netherlands**^{^}	2	1924	2000	7	5	0	2	43	35	+8	71.43%	LEN
Romania	0	1952	2012	5	4	0	1	34	25	+9	80.00%	LEN
**Russia**^{^}	2	2000	2004	2	0	0	2	17	20	-3	0.00%	LEN
**Serbia**^{^}	3	2008	2012	3	1	0	2	18	20	-2	33.33%	LEN
**Serbia and Montenegro**^{^†}	1	1996	2004	3	1	0	2	21	25	-4	33.33%	LEN
**Soviet Union**^{^†}	7	1956	1988	4	1	1	2	18	24	-6	25.00%	LEN
**Spain**^{^}	2	1920	2016	9	4	0	5	62	57	+5	44.44%	LEN
**Sweden**^{^}	3	1920	1952	4	1	0	3	6	19	-13	25.00%	LEN
Ukraine	0	1996	1996	1	1	0	0	9	7	+2	100.00%	LEN
**Unified Team**^{^†}	1	1992	1992	2	0	0	2	9	16	-7	0.00%	LEN
Uruguay	0	1936	1948	2	2	0	0	9	1	+8	100.00%	ASUA
**West Germany**^{^†}	1	1968	1984	3	2	1	0	19	16	+3	66.67%	LEN
**Yugoslavia**^{^†}	8	1952	1988	8	2	1	5	30	40	-10	25.00%	LEN
Total	73	1920	2016	129	68	6	55	791	714	+77	52.71%	
Team	Medals	First	Latest	MP	W	D	L	GF	GA	GD	Win %	Confederation

^{^}Teams that have won at least one Olympic medal are shown in bold.
^{†}Defunct teams are shown in italic.

=== Records ===
==== Victories, ties and defeats ====
- Biggest victory in an Olympic match
  - **10–0** vs. Malta, Aug 8, 1928
  - **10–0** vs. Japan, Aug 7, 1932
- Biggest home victory in an Olympic match
  - **10–0** vs. Japan, Aug 7, 1932
- Heaviest defeat in an Olympic match
  - **0–7** vs. Hungary, Aug 11, 1932
  - **0–7** vs. Sweden, Aug 3, 1948
- Heaviest home defeat in an Olympic match
  - **0–7** vs. Hungary, Aug 11, 1932
- Most victories in an Olympic tournament
  - **6**, 1972 Summer Olympics
  - **6**, 1984 Summer Olympics
- Most consecutive victories in an Olympic tournament
  - **6**, Aug 1, 1984 vs. Greece – Aug 9, 1984 vs. West Germany
- Most consecutive victories at the Olympic Games
  - **8**, Oct 22, 1968 vs. West Germany – Aug 31, 1972 vs. Yugoslavia
- Most matches without defeat in an Olympic tournament
  - **8**, 1972 Summer Olympics
- Most consecutive matches without defeat in an Olympic tournament
  - **7**, Aug 1, 1984 vs. Greece – Aug 10, 1984 vs. Yugoslavia
- Most consecutive matches without defeat at the Olympic Games
  - **10**, Sep 4, 1972 vs. Italy – Sep 21, 1988 vs. Yugoslavia
- Most defeats in an Olympic tournament
  - **5**, 2000 Summer Olympics
  - **5**, 2012 Summer Olympics
- Most consecutive defeats in an Olympic tournament
  - **5**, Aug 4, 2012 vs. Serbia – Aug 12, 2012 vs. Australia
- Most consecutive defeats at the Olympic Games
  - **7**, Aug 4, 2012 vs. Serbia – Aug 8, 2016 vs. Spain
- Most matches without victory in an Olympic tournament
  - **5**, 2000 Summer Olympics
  - **5**, 2012 Summer Olympics
- Most consecutive matches without victory in an Olympic tournament
  - **5**, Aug 4, 2012 vs. Serbia – Aug 12, 2012 vs. Australia
- Most consecutive matches without victory at the Olympic Games
  - **7**, Aug 4, 2012 vs. Serbia – Aug 8, 2016 vs. Spain
- Most ties in an Olympic tournament
  - **2**, 1972 Summer Olympics
- Most matches without a tie in an Olympic tournament
  - **9**, 1952 Summer Olympics
- Most consecutive matches without a tie at the Olympic Games
  - **57**, Sep 21, 1988 vs. Yugoslavia – Aug 14, 2016 vs. Italy

==== Goals for and against ====
- Most goals for in an Olympic match
  - **18**–9 vs. Greece, Sep 26, 1988
- Least goals for in an Olympic match
  - **0**–5 vs. Hungary, Aug 6, 1928
  - **0**–7 vs. Hungary, Aug 11, 1932
  - **0**–7 vs. Sweden, Aug 3, 1948
  - **0**–4 vs. Hungary, Aug 2, 1952
- Most goals against in an Olympic match
  - 10–**14** vs. Hungary, Aug 24, 2008
- Least goals against in an Olympic match
  - 7–**0** vs. Greece, Aug 24, 1920
  - 5–**0** vs. Spain, Aug 28, 1920
  - 10–**0** vs. Malta, Aug 8, 1928
  - 10–**0** vs. Japan, Aug 7, 1932
  - 7–**0** vs. Uruguay, Jul 30, 1948
- Most matches scoring in an Olympic tournament
  - **9**, 1972 Summer Olympics
- Most consecutive matches scoring in an Olympic tournament
  - **9**, 1972 Summer Olympics
- Most consecutive matches scoring at the Olympic Games
  - **97**, Nov 28, 1956 vs. Great Britain – Aug 14, 2016 vs. Italy
- Most matches without scoring in an Olympic tournament
  - **1**, 1928 Summer Olympics
  - **1**, 1932 Summer Olympics
  - **1**, 1948 Summer Olympics
  - **1**, 1952 Summer Olympics
- Most matches conceding a goal in an Olympic tournament
  - **9**, 1952 Summer Olympics
  - **9**, 1972 Summer Olympics
- Most consecutive matches conceding a goal in an Olympic tournament
  - **9**, 1952 Summer Olympics
  - **9**, 1972 Summer Olympics
- Most consecutive matches conceding a goal at the Olympic Games
  - **108**, Jul 31, 1948 vs. Belgium – Aug 14, 2016 vs. Italy

== See also ==
- List of United States men's Olympic water polo team rosters
- United States men's Olympic water polo team statistics
  - United States men's Olympic water polo team statistics (appearances)
  - United States men's Olympic water polo team statistics (matches played)
  - United States men's Olympic water polo team statistics (scorers)
  - United States men's Olympic water polo team statistics (goalkeepers)
  - United States men's Olympic water polo team statistics (medalists)
- United States men's national water polo team
