= Luca Giustolisi =

Italian water polo player (1970–2023)

Personal information
- Nationality: Italian
- Born: 11 September 1970 Trieste, Italy
- Died: 14 September 2023 (aged 53)

Sport
- Sport: Water polo
Medal record
Men's Water polo
Representing Italy
Summer Olympics
Bronze medal – third place	1996 Atlanta	Team competition
Universiade
Bronze medal – third place	1993 Buffalo	Team
- Updated on 10 August 2023

Luca Giustolisi (13 March 1970 – 14 September 2023) was an Italian water polo player who won a bronze medal in the 1996 Summer Olympics.

== Life and career ==
Born in Trieste, the son of the water polo referee and manager Giuseppe, during his career Giustolisi won a LEN Trophy and a LEN Cup Winners' Cup with Roma, and two LEN Champions League titles with CN Posillipo and Pro Recco. With the Italian national team, he won the gold medal in the 1995 European Aquatics Championships and a bronze in the 1996 Summer Olympics.

After his retirement, Giustolisi graduated in psychology and was honorary judge of the Juvenile Court of Trieste. He also worked as coach and technical director for several teams. He died from cancer on 14 September 2023, at the age of 53. He was married to lyric soprano Anna Caterina Antonacci and had a son, Gillo.

== See also ==
- List of Olympic medalists in water polo (men)
