= Water polo at the 1993 Summer Universiade =

Water polo at the XVII Summer Universiade

Medalists
1st place, gold medalist(s)		United States
2nd place, silver medalist(s)		Hungary
3rd place, bronze medalist(s)		Italy

Water polo events were contested at the 1993 Summer Universiade in Buffalo, New York, USA.

Event	Gold	Silver	Bronze
Men's	United States (USA); Luis Nicolau; Tony Barnes; Alex Asta; Steve Gill; Dan Hackett; Chris Kellerman; Sean Nolan; Marc Hunt; Chris Wallin; Wolf Wigo; Mike Burke; Todd Hosmer; José Santiago	Hungary (HUN); Tibor Torok; Gabor Szabo; Kalman Toth; Robert Lovanyi; Tibor Pardi; Ferenc Berezvai; Andras Gal; Zoltan Szabo; Sandor Sugar; Andras Bene; Gyorgy Martinovics; Zoltan Podhanszky; Laszlo Jokuti	Italy (ITA); Claudio Caorsi; Massimo Castellani; Alessandro Cristilli; Daniele Dani; Simone Feoli; Luca Giustolisi; Lorenzo Lonzi; Mario Marsili; Bruno Parodi; Antonio Piccione; Luca Ranalli; Andrija Stella; Paolo Zizzo
