= Tibor Pardi =

Hungarian water polo player

Personal information
- Nationality: Hungarian
- Born: 5 December 1967 Budapest, Hungary
- Died: 28 February 2007 (aged 39) Budapest, Hungary

Sport
- Sport: Water polo
Medal record
Men's Water polo
Representing Hungary
Summer Universiade
Silver medal – second place	1993 Buffalo	Team
- Updated on 10 August 2023

Tibor Pardi (5 December 1967 – 28 February 2007) was a Hungarian water polo player. He competed in the men's tournament at the 1988 Summer Olympics.
