= Ricardo Azevedo =

Brazilian water polo player and coach

Ricardo (Rico) Azevedo
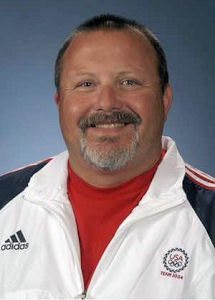
- Azevedo in US Olympic warm-up

Biographical details
- Born: August 24, 1956 (age 69); Rio de Janeiro, Brazil

Playing career
- 1974-1977: Brazilian National Team
- 1975, 1977: Long Beach City College
- 1977-1979: Long Beach State

Coaching career (HC unless noted)
- 1980-1998: Woodrow Wilson High
- 1999-2005: Long Beach State
- 1996, 2000, 2004: US Nat. Team Asst. Coach
- 2005-2006: US National Team Head Coach
- 2007-2008: RN ElettroGreen Camogli

Accomplishments and honors

Awards
- '02 MPSF Water Polo Coach of Year (LBS Women)

Ricardo Azevedo (born August 24, 1956) was a Brazilian water polo player who served on the Brazilian National Team. After playing water polo for Long Beach State, he is best known as a professional water polo coach who coached Long Beach State from 1999-2005, and served as an Assistant coach to the US National Olympic team in 1996, 2000, and 2004. He served briefly as Head Coach in 2005. He coached the Italian Club team, RN ElettroGreen Camogli in 2007-8, and later coached the Chinese Men's and Women's National teams.

== Playing career ==
Born in Rio de Janeiro, Brazil on August 24, 1956, Azevedo played on the Brazilian National Water Polo Team from 1974 to 1977. He was a member of the Brazilian Water Polo team at the 1976 Olympics in Montreal. He was twice voted Brazil's "Player of the Year". In 1976, the Brazilian team won the gold medal in the South American Games.

=== Collegiate water polo ===
Azevedo attended Long Beach City College from 1975-1977, where he was named the Most Valuable Player for his College, his Conference, and for Southern California. While at City College, he received the honor of Junior College All American. After transferring, Azevedo received his Bachelor of Arts degree from California State University, Long Beach in 1980, playing for Long Beach State from 1977-1979.

== Coaching ==
After his playing career, Azevedo became a water polo coach and is now considered one the premier coaches in the world. Azevedo coached the strong program at Woodrow Wilson Classical High School from around 1980-1998, leading the team to a title in the California Interscholastic Federation in 1998.

=== US National Team ===
He was an Assistant Coach for the USA Men's Water Polo Team in the Olympic years 1996, 2000, and 2004, and started as Head Coach in 2005. He coached the USA Junior Team, and coached at Long Beach State University from 1999-2005, where he amassed a record of 107-96..

=== European club teams ===
Azevedo became head coach of RN ElettroGreen Camogli in 2007, unexpectedly leading his young team to the division Championship title game in 2008. Azevedo speaks English, Spanish, Italian, Portuguese, and Chinese.

=== Chinese National team ===
He coached and trained the Chinese Men's National Team in 2011. Training consisted of 6-8 hour practices a day, The team had height with six players over 6' 5", with an average height of 6' 3". At the 2012 Summer Olympics, Azevedo served as the head coach of the Chinese Men's Water Polo National team.

He later coached the Chinese Women's National Water Polo Team, leading them to the 2016 Rio Olympics where they placed seventh, though only eight countries participated. The Chinese women's team had a disappointing Olympics, losing to Hungary 13-11, the United States 12-4, and Spain 12-8, and did not make the quarterfinals.

=== Return to Brazilian National team ===
Azevedo returned to his native country where he was the Brazilian Water Polo Team's Technical director from 2017-2019.

=== Marriage and Family ===
Azevedo met his wife Libby when he was an exchange student at Long Beach State, and they were married in 1980.

Azevedo has coached several Olympians, including his son Tony Azevedo who was a four-time All American and NCAA Player of the Year at Stanford University and served as Captain of the Men's Water Polo Team for the 2008 Summer Olympics and 2012 Summer Olympics. Tony was on the US Olympic team in 2000, and 2004. Ricardo's daughter Cassie was a two-time All-American water polo player at Long Beach State.
