= Craig Wilson (water polo) =

American water polo player (born 1957)

Personal information
- Full name: Craig Martin Wilson
- Nickname: Willy
- Born: February 5, 1957 (age 69) Beeville, Texas
- Education: UC Santa Barbara
- Occupation: Medical Sales/Management
- Height: 6 ft 5 in (196 cm)
- Weight: 190 lb (86 kg)
- Spouse: Nicole Wilson
- Children: Aly Wilson

Sport
- Sport: Men's water polo
- Position: Goaltender
- College team: UC Santa Barbara
- Club: Industry Hills; Harvard WP Foundation; CN Barcelona; CC Ortigia
- Coached by: M. Nitzkowski ('84 Olympics); B. Barnett ('88-92 Olympics)
Medal record
Men's water polo
Representing the United States
Olympic Games
Silver medal – second place	1984 Los Angeles	Men's water polo
Silver medal – second place	1988 Seoul	Men's water polo
- Updated on 21:55, September 19, 2014 (UTC)

Craig Martin Wilson (born February 5, 1957) is an American former water polo player who was a member of the United States men's national water polo team and two-time Olympic silver medalist. He is considered the best goalkeeper in the sport's history.

== Early life and education ==
The Wilson family moved from Texas to California when Craig was four, eventually settling in Davis where he played at Davis Senior High School and was named a high school Honorable Mention All American in his Senior year in 1975. Wilson then moved to Santa Barbara where he spent 2 years at Santa Barbara City College (they had no water polo program at this time) before transferring to the University of California, Santa Barbara.

Entering UC Santa Barbara, Wilson was a walk-on to the varsity team. Upon arrival, he started as the 5th string goalkeeper, eventually becoming a member of the UC Santa Barbara men's water polo for the 1978 and 1979 seasons. The Gauchos won the 1979 NCAA Division I Men's Water Polo Championship with Wilson named to the All-Tournament Team and as a Second Team All American.

== Playing career ==
=== Club ===
Wilson competed with the Industry Hills club in 1981 and 1982, where he played alongside former Gaucho teammate Greg Boyer. Industry Hills was named the USWP National Outdoor Champions in both seasons he played for the club.

He later competed and trained with the Harvard Water Polo Foundation, based out of Los Angeles, and was the goalkeeper for the club's first championship in 1989. This was the first of three straight championships to which he led Harvard Water Polo Foundation, the last over Sunset Water Polo Club, which consisted of seven of his former 1979 UC Santa Barbara teammates.

Wilson went on to win five USWP National Championships, both outdoors and indoors. He was named the US Water Polo Athlete of the Year four times (1983, 1987, 1988, 1991) and the Most Valuable Player in 1990.

Wilson also played overseas, moving to Italy and joining Sicily-based club CC Ortigia where he stayed for two seasons then moved to Spain Barcelona-based club CN Barcelona for one season.

=== International ===
Wilson was a member of the United States men's national water polo team from 1981 through 1992.

He was a member of three Pan American Games delegations, playing in 1983, 1987, and 1991, where he won two gold and one silver medal. Wilson also appeared heavily for the United States in the FINA Water Polo World Cup, appearing five total times and finally winning a gold medal at the 1991 FINA Men's Water Polo World Cup, and the FINA World Championships, appearing in 1982, 1986, and 1991.

== 1984-1992 Olympics ==
Wilson's greatest accomplishments came in the Olympics. He was a member of three teams and won two silver medals.

I realized that I was behind the world's best goalkeeper, undeniably, in everyone's mind. You know where you stand. That part is very clear.

— Christopher Duplanty on attempting to supplant Wilson as starting goalkeeper.

His first appearance was in the 1984 Summer Olympics, under Head Olympic Coach Monte Nitzkowski where the United States placed second to Yugoslavia despite not losing a match the entire Games. After advancing from group play, the final round featured the United States playing Yugoslavia in the last match. The teams played to a 5–5 draw, giving each team 5 wins and 1 draw; however, with a superior goal differential, Yugoslavia emerged victorious.

In the 1988 Summer Olympics, under Head Olympic Coach Bill Barnett, Yugoslavia was drawn into the same preliminary group as the United States, with the US claiming a 7–6 victory. Both teams advanced from group play and, in a change from the previous Games, faced off in a championship match. The United States came second best, again, on the wrong side of a 9-7 score. After the heartbreaking loss, Wilson claimed he wouldn't appear in another Olympics and would be retiring.

Despite not missing a beat, Wilson turned course and decided to appear in the 1992 Summer Olympics. At this stage, he was the oldest men's water polo player at the Games. Despite the United States' past successes, the team failed to medal in 1992 and would mark the last Olympics Wilson would participate in.

=== Outlet pass ===
Before Craig came along, no goalie could really throw it over halfway down the pool. He revolutionized his position.

— Monte Nitzkowski on Wilson's addition to the game.

Wilson is credited with the introduction of the "outlet pass" to water polo. A former Little League pitcher, he was able to move the ball from defense to offense quickly with a long pass to the offensive players from his position in goal. Richard Corso, the former US National Team Goalkeepers Coach who assisted Wilson, noted that "We really changed the game in 1980 and '84. Craig's technique as a passer has been copied by everyone. Goalies were looking to get the pass out to start the fast break."

== Professional career ==
After the 1992 Olympics, Wilson joined the private sector and worked in medical device and pharmaceutical sales and for Fortune 500 companies. From 1994-98 he worked for Cardinal Health, switching from 1998-99 to sales of orthopaedic devices with Sulzer Orthopaedics. Through 2004, he served with Bristol-Myers Squibb, then worked two years in accounts for Oncology Therapeutics Network. Through 2010, he served with McKesson, later serving as a Director of Technology for Amerisource Bergen.

He stayed close to the sport and released Guide to Waterpolo goalkeeping, a short book about techniques for the goalkeeping position.

=== Honors ===
Wilson is a member of the Class of 1999 USA Water Polo Hall of Fame and was inducted July 17, 1999. Additionally, was inducted into the International Swimming Hall of Fame as a member of the Class of 2005.

He's also in the UCSB Gaucho Athletic Hall of Fame twice, being named once individually and once as a member of the 1979 NCAA Championship men's water polo team, and is the only player in the history of the UC Santa Barbara men's water polo program to have his cap retired.

== See also ==
- List of Olympic medalists in water polo (men)
- List of men's Olympic water polo tournament goalkeepers
- List of members of the International Swimming Hall of Fame
