= McQuin Baron =

American water polo player (born 1995)

Personal information
- Born: 27 October 1995 (age 30) Laguna Beach, California
- Height: 203 cm (6 ft 8 in)
- Weight: 104 kg (229 lb)

Sport
- Sport: Water polo
- Position: Goalkeeper
- College team: University of Southern California
- Club: Regency WP Club; United Water Polo Club
- Coached by: Chris Segesman (Mater Dei); Jovan Vavic (USC)
Medal record
Representing United States
Pan American Games
Gold medal – first place	2015 Toronto	team

McQuin Baron (born 27 October 1995) is a former water polo goaltender from the United States who competed for the University of Southern California. He was part of the American team that competed in the water polo tournament at the 2016 Rio de Janeiro Olympics, where the team finished in tenth place.

== Early life ==
McQuin Baron was born one of four children on October 27, 1995 in Laguna Beach, California to father Mike and mother Mindy. He attended Santa Ana, California's Mater Dei High School where he helped lead the team to three California Interscholastic Federation Southern Section titles. At Mater Dei, he was coached by former Olympian and Water Polo Hall of Fame inductee Chris Segesman. Baron was honored as a first team All-CIF and All-League selection. He was a league Most Valuable player in his Senior year in 2013, and a Player of the Year. As an outstanding goaltender, he was credited with a notable 1,200 saves during his four years in High School. In Club play, he competed for the Regency Water Polo Club.

== University of Southern California ==
Baron attended the University of Southern California, where as a Junior in 2016, he was honored with the Peter J. Cutino Award, given to the top collegiate water polo player of the year. Playing under Coach Jovan Vavic, the USC water polo team made the finals of the NCAA tournament from 2014 to 2016, and won the National Championship in 2018. As a nationally recognized goalkeeper, Baron was voted the National Player of the Year, and was credited with 247 saves in 2016. In his Sophomore season at USC, he had 282 saves, and earned Second Team All American standing. In his first USC Season, he had 288 saves, a school record, and received Second team All-American honors. He was planning on majoring in urban planning and development at USC.

== 2016 Rio Olympics ==
Baron participated with the men's Olympic water polo tournament at the 2016 Summer Olympics in Rio de Janeiro, where the U.S. team finished 10th overall, under U.S. Head Olympic Coach Dejan Udovičić, with Serbia taking the Gold, Croatia the silver, and Italy taking the bronze medal. In their second game, the US team lost to Spain with a close a disappointing final score of 10–9, and lost their first game against the strong team from Croatia 7–5. Team Captain Tony Avezedo was a team high scorer.

In international competition, as part of the US National team, he participated in the FINA World League Super Final in 2016, and at the Super Finals in 2014 and 2015. He was also on the US National team at the FINA World Aquatic Championships in 2015 and 2017. Baron was part of the US National team that captured a gold medal at the 2015 Pan American Games in Toronto, Canada.

== See also ==
- List of men's Olympic water polo tournament goalkeepers
