= Harry Daniels (water polo) =

American swimmer and water polo player (1900–1965)

Harry C. Daniels
- 1922, Northwestern U. Publication

Personal information
- Full name: Harry Clifton Daniels
- Born: June 23, 1900 Boston, Massachusetts, United States
- Died: February 21, 1965 (aged 64) Evanston, Illinois, United States
- Occupation: stockbroker
- Height: 6 ft 1.5 in (1.867 m)
- Spouse: Marian Judson
- Children: 3

Sport
- Sport: Water polo, breaststroke, backstroke
- College team: Northwestern University 1921
- Club: Chicago Athletic Association
- Coached by: Tom Robinson, (Northwestern); Perry McGillivray (Water polo)

Harry Clifton Daniels (June 23, 1900 – February 21, 1965) was an American competitive swimmer and water polo player who competed for Northwestern University and played goalie for the U.S. Water Polo team at the 1928 Amsterdam Olympics.

Daniels was born the third of five children on June 23, 1900, to Harry Everett Daniels, who headed the West Disinfecting Company, a railway supplier, and Jane Johnson Sloan Daniels in Forest Hills in Boston, Massachusetts. Harry Daniels's father was athletic and a member of the Illinois Athletic and Golf Club, and like Harry was a mason.

== Northwestern University ==
He trained in swimming and water polo with the highly competitive teams of the Chicago Athletic Association where he would become a life member. Beginning in 1918, he swam and played water polo at Evanston's Northwestern University where he was managed by Hall of Fame Coach Tom Robinson, the college's first swim coach. Daniels graduated from Northwestern in 1921. In an era before specialized coaches, Robinson managed swimming, diving and water polo, producing Olympians in all three sports. Daniels lettered in his Freshman year, and was an intercollegiate breast and backstroke champion while at Northwestern.

He married Marian Judson on October 6, 1923, in the greater Chicago area. Marian was a French major at Northwestern, graduating in 1923.

== 1928 Amsterdam Olympics ==
He competed in the men's tournament for the U.S. Water Polo team, at the 1928 Amsterdam Olympics where he was coached by 1912 and 1920 Olympic swimming medalist Perry McGillivray. McGillivray competed as both a swimmer and exceptional water polo player for the Illinois Athletic Club. With Daniels playing goalie, the U.S. Water Polo team finished in a four-way tie for fifth place against a highly competitive European field of competitors. With the American team finishing out of medal contention, Germany, Hungary, a frequent medalist, and France took the gold, silver, and bronze medals respectively in the water polo competition finals.

== Post-olympic life ==
Not long after the Olympics, Daniels worked in Evanston, Illinois as a prominent stockbroker beginning his career around 1930. He was a senior partner with Apgar, Daniels, and Co., and was a 28-year member of the Chicago Stock exchange. He served on the Midwest Stock Exchange for 35 years, and was a panel arbitrator for 12 years with the New York Stock Exchange.

Harry and his wife were members of the Adventurers Club, and Harry served as president. The couple traveled to Europe, Asia, and South America from 1928 through 1960. Harry was also a member of the Medinah Shrine and belonged to the John Evans Masonic Lodge in Evanston. John Evans was a Northwestern University founder, a governor of the Colorado territory beginning in 1862, and a freemason.

He died in Evanston, Illinois, on Sunday, February 20, 1965, with services held on Tuesday, February 23 at the Heblewaite Chapel. He had lived in the Evanston area for forty-five years, beginning with his studies at Northwestern. After services, he was buried in Memorial Park Cemetery, at Gross Point Road in Skokie, Illinois. He was survived by his widow the former Marion Judson, three daughters, and seven grandchildren.

== See also ==
- List of men's Olympic water polo tournament goalkeepers
