= Daniel Hackett (water polo) =

American water polo player (born 1970)

Personal information
- Born: September 11, 1970 (age 56) Syracuse, New York, United States
- Height: 198 cm (6 ft 6 in)
- Weight: 89 kg (196 lb)

Sport
- Sport: Water polo
- Position: Goalkeeper (Water Polo)
- College team: UC Los Angeles
- Coached by: Bob Horn, Guy Baker (UCLA); Rich Corso, John Vargas (Olympics)
Medal record
Men's Water polo
Representing United States
Summer Universiade
Gold medal – first place	1991 Sheffield	Team
Gold medal – first place	1993 Buffalo	Team
Pan American Games
Gold medal – first place	1995 Mar del Plata	Team
Gold medal – first place	1999 Winnipeg	Team
- Updated on 10 August 2023

Daniel Andrew Hackett (born September 11, 1970) is an American water polo player. He competed at the 1996 Summer Olympics in Atlanta and the 2000 Summer Olympics in Sydney, Australia.

== University of California Los Angeles ==
Hackett attended and played water polo for the University of California Los Angeles from 1998-1992 under Head Coaches Bob Horn and Guy Baker. While at UCLA, Hackett received All-American honors in water polo twice.

== Olympics ==
Hacket participated in the 1996 Summer Olympics in Atlanta, Georgia under Head Coach Richard Corso as an alternate goaltender for the American team that placed seventh overall in competition. The team from Spain took the gold medal, Croatia took the silver, and Italy took the bronze.

Four years later he played with the U.S. National team at the 2000 Sydney Olympics under Head Coach John Vargas that placed sixth overall. Perpetual pre-game favorite Hungary took the gold, Russia took the silver medal and Yugoslavia took the bronze.

=== Careers ===
After his athletic career, he worked for Day Software, Adobe, and Accenture Interactive. He later served with Mirum, and was a Sales Director of LiveArea in 2017.

== See also ==
- List of men's Olympic water polo tournament goalkeepers
