= Fred Lauer =

American water polo player (1898–1960)

Frederick William Lauer
- Lauer as a youthful competitor

Personal information
- Full name: Frederick William Lauer Sr.
- National team: USA
- Born: October 13, 1898 Chicago, Illinois, United States
- Died: December 17, 1960 (aged 62) Phoenix, Arizona, United States
- Occupations: Executive; Advertising, Merchandising
- Spouse: Victoria

Sport
- Sport: Water polo
- Position: goalkeeper (WP)
- Club: Illinois Athletic Club (IAC); Los Angeles Athletic Club
- Coached by: Bill Bachrach (IAC)
Medal record
Representing United States
Olympic Games
Bronze medal – third place	1924 Paris	Team competition

Frederick William Lauer (October 13, 1898 – December 17, 1960) was an American water polo player who competed for the Chicago Athletic Club and participated in the 1924 Summer Olympics that won a team bronze medal, and the 1936 Summer Olympics in Berlin that tied for ninth place. He later had a career in Chicago as an Advertising and Merchandising executive, before retiring to Phoenix, Arizona.

Frederick Lauer was born October 13, 1898, in Chicago, Illinois, and competed and trained with the Illinois Athletic Club coached by Hall of Fame Coach William Bachrach. He was a member of the Illinois Athletic club team that captured first place in the American Athletic Union (AAU) indoor water polo championships in 1924, 1927, 1930, 1932, 1933 and 1934. In his career in water polo, he was a recipient of All American honors three times.

The 1924 Illinois Athletic Club team that won the National Championship consisted of Lauer, Johnny Weissmuller, Archie Wallen, Francis McDermott, Oliver Horn, Buddy Wallen, Harry Hebner, Floyd Towne, and Perry McGillivray.

== Olympics ==
=== 1924 Paris ===
Lauer participated in the 1924 Summer Olympics in Paris for the U.S. team that won the bronze medal in the 1924 Men's Olympic water polo competition. He played all five matches as goalkeeper. At the 1924 Olympics, the U.S. swimming and water polo team was coached by Bill Bachrach. Lauer was an alternate for the U.S. water polo team for the 1928 Amsterdam Olympics.

=== 1932 Los Angeles ===
In the 1932 Olympic games in Los Angeles, he was a squad member of the American team which won the bronze medal. He did not participate in a match, however, and was not awarded with a medal. France took the gold medal and Belgium took the silver.

=== 1936 Berlin ===
In the 1936 Berlin Olympics, the American men's Olympic water polo team was eliminated from competition in their first round and tied for ninth place. Lauer led the U.S. team in opening ceremonies and played one match as goalkeeper. Hungary won the gold, Germany won the silver, and Belgium won the bronze medal.

=== Honors ===
In 1979, he was inducted into the USA Water Polo Hall of Fame.

=== Later life ===
In his career, Lauer was an executive in the field of advertising and merchandizing, living much of his life in Chicago, Illinois. Nearing retirement, he began wintering in Phoenix, Arizona in 1956. In Illinois, he had a home in Wilmette.

He died on February 17, 1960, of an apparent heart attack at the age of 62 at his home on West Palm Lane, in Phoenix, Arizona, and was survived by three sons and his wife Victoria. Funeral services were held on the morning of February 20 at the A. L. Moore and Sons Chapel, and he was buried at Greenwood Memorial Park.

== See also ==
- List of Olympic medalists in water polo (men)
- List of men's Olympic water polo tournament goalkeepers
