= Charles E. Collett =

American water polo player and lawyer

Personal information
- Born: March 19, 1903 San Francisco, United States
- Died: May 3, 1968 (aged 65) San Francisco, United States

Sport
- Sport: Water polo

Charles E. Collett (1903–1968) was an American water polo player and lawyer.

Born in San Francisco, he became a member of the Olympic Club at the age of 12. Besides becoming an avid swimmer, his childhood included ferryboat rides to Marin and runs out to Stinson Beach along the Dipsea Trail. A musician, he played the alto saxophone and piano. He attended Polytechnic High School in San Francisco and then went on to Stanford where he received his BA degree. He was a member of the Delta Tau Delta fraternity there and captained the Stanford water polo team. He was selected for the US Olympics 1924 water polo team and came back with a bronze award for their performance. In 1982, he was inducted into the USA Water Polo Hall of Fame.

Upon graduating from Stanford, Mr. Collett attended Hastings Law School in San Francisco where he obtained his law degree. A member of the Bohemian Club, he pursued his interests in music and acting with the Club, participating in numerous performances at the Grove. He also performed in many venues around the Bay Area most notably the Mountain Theater on Mount Tamalpais. Mr. Collett enlisted in the US Navy during World War II and served as a lieutenant in the Pacific Campaign. He was on the ill-fated St. Lo escort carrier in the Battle of Leyte Gulf during which his ship was attacked and sunk by a Kamikaze fighter plane. He not only survived the subsequent ordeal but helped keep two injured men afloat and received the Bronze Star for his effort.

Mr. Collett served as the assistant US Attorney for the Ninth Circuit Court of Appeals. He fathered four children.

== See also ==
- List of Olympic medalists in water polo (men)
