= Genai Kerr =

American water polo player (born 1976)

Personal information
- Full name: Genai Gangel Kerr
- Born: December 25, 1976 (age 49) Los Angeles, California, United States
- Height: 6 ft 8 in (2.03 m)
- Weight: 225 lb (102 kg)

Sport
- Sport: Water Polo
- Position: goalie
- Club: Newport Water Polo Foundation (1995–2009)
- Team: United States (1998–2010)
Medal record
Representing United States
Pan American Games
Gold medal – first place	2003 Santo Domingo	Team competition
Gold medal – first place	2007 Rio de Janeiro	Team competition

Genai Kerr is an American water polo player. He is a member of the United States men's national water polo team and played in the 2004 Athens Olympics. Genai was a member of the United States Men's National Water Polo Team for 12 years and played in the 2004 Athens Olympics, 2003 & 2007 Pan American Gold medal games, and multiple World Championships. He is one of the only athletes in history to compete internationally as a goalie and as a field player. Most recently he was named MVP of the 2012 US Open after he helped Newport Water Polo Foundation win the national championship. Genai has coached at every level, from age group to Division 1 college programs. Over the last 15 years he has run hundreds of camps with Nike 5meter Water Polo Camps.

== Early years ==
Genai got involved in water polo by accident, following the whistles to what he thought was a basketball game and ended up at the pool at the age of 15. He excelled at both water polo and basketball at Coronado High School and received a water polo scholarship to UC Irvine to play under Coach Ted Newland. Genai was an NCAA All-American in 1998 and 1999 and was awarded Big West Conference Male Scholar Athlete of the Year his senior year. He was the first African American to represent USA Water Polo in a major World Championship.

== Community service roles ==
Genai remains active in his community and has become a great role model. He has served as a US Ambassador for the USADA (U.S. Antidoping Agency) since 2003 promoting clean sports for young athletes. He was a founding faculty member of the Sage Hill School where he was the Dean of Students, taught art and physical education, and started the aquatic programs. Genai has also created several community outreach programs to help mentor children in lower income households. Recently he has collaborated with KidWorks, USA Water Polo Spashball, and various YMCA programs.

== USA National Team ==
- 2012 US Open, Irvine, California, 1st Place - MVP
- 2010 Volvo Cup, Hungary, 3rd place
- 2009 FINA World Championships, Rome, Italy, 4th place
- 2009 FINA World League Super Final, Podgorica, Montenegro, 4th place
- 2007 FINA World League Super Finals, Berlin, Germany 5th place
- 2007 Pan American Games, Rio de Janeiro, Brazil, 1st place
- 2007 FINA World Championships, Melbourne, Australia, 9th place
- 2006 ASUA Cup, Rio de Janeiro, Brazil, 1st place
- 2006 FINA World League Super Finals, Athens, Greece, 5th place
- 2004 Olympic Games, Athens, Greece, 7th place
- 2003 FINA World League Super Finals, New York, NY, 3rd place
- 2003 Pan American Games, Santo Domingo, Dominican Republic, 1st place
- 2003 FINA World Championships, Barcelona, Spain, 6th place
- 2003 U.S. Cup, Stanford, CA, United States, 2nd place
- 2002 FINA World Cup, Belgrade, Yugoslavia, 7th place
- 2001 FINA World Championships, Fukuoka, Japan, 7th place
- 2001 World Championships Qualifier, Santo Domingo, Dominican Republic, 1st place
- 1998 First Appearance on the Men’s National Team, Long Beach, CA
- 1995 Jr. North American Games, Calgary, Canada, 2nd place

== See also ==
- List of men's Olympic water polo tournament goalkeepers
