= Brandon Brooks (water polo) =

American water polo player (born 1981)

Current position
- Title: Head coach
- Team: UCLA Women's water polo
- Conference: MPSF
- Record: 18-3, (1-1 Conference)

Biographical details
- Born: April 29, 1981 (age 45); Rock Island, Illinois, U.S.

Playing career
- 2001–2005: UCLA
- Positions: Goalkeeper (water polo); Center (basketball)

Coaching career (HC unless noted)
- 2004, 2006-08: UCLA Men's water polo (Asst.)
- 2007-09: Women's water polo (Asst.)
- 2009-2017: UCLA Women's water polo

Head coaching record
- Overall: 89-22

Accomplishments and honors

Championships
- 2× MPSF Women's Champion (2010, 2012) (Head Coach); 3× NCAA Women's Champion (2007-09) (Asst. Coach); NCAA Champion (2004) (Asst. Coach); 2× NCAA Champion (1999, 2000) (Player)

Awards
- 4× All-American (1999–2002); 3× All-MPSF (2000–2002); MPSF Coach of the Year (2012)
Medal record
Men's water polo
Representing the United States
Olympic Games
Silver medal – second place	2008 Beijing	Team competition

Brandon Brooks (born April 29, 1981), who played water polo as a goalie for UCLA and the 2004 and 2008 United States National teams, was the head coach of the women's water polo team at UCLA until 2017. The women's team won the 2008 and 2009 NCAA Women's Water Polo Championship, and one of his players, Courtney Mathewson, captured the Peter J. Cutino Award as the player-of-the year in 2008.

On June 3, 2009, Brooks was named the head coach of the UCLA Bruins women's water polo team, having served as its men's and women's water polo team assistant coach. He was also named as an assistant coach to the USA water polo women's senior national team for the 2009 FINA World Championships.

== Early years ==
Brooks is the oldest in his family of three children. He has twin sisters. He was born in Rock Island, Illinois, but was educated in Honolulu, Hawaii, and attended Punahou School. At Punahou, he played both basketball and water polo.

== College ==
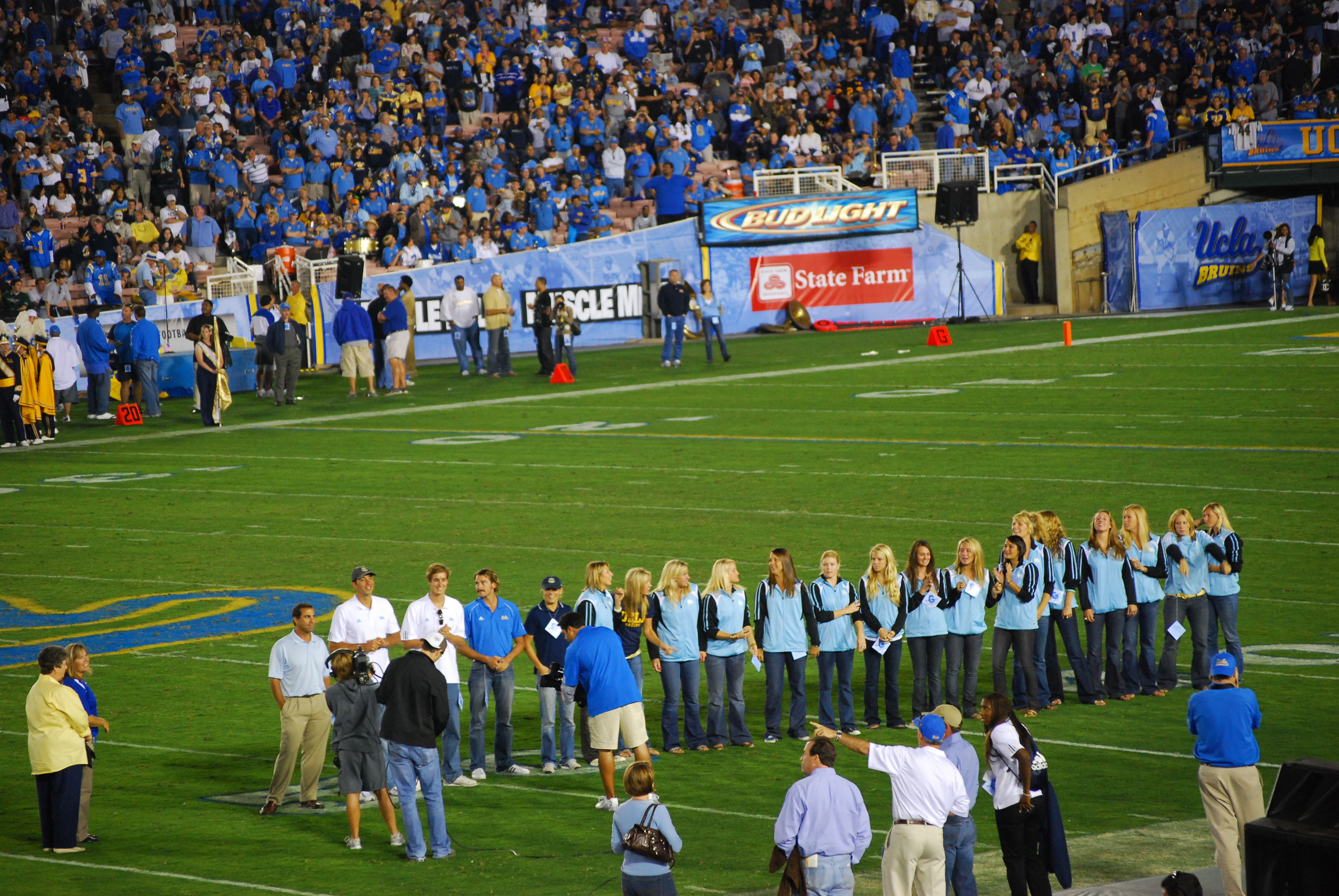
Brandon Brooks (second from left) and his UCLA women's water polo team were honored for winning UCLA's 100th NCAA Championship in 2007.

He was the goalkeeper at UCLA for four years and was a four-time All-America selection (1999 hm, 2000, 2001 and 2002). He helped UCLA to NCAA Men's Water Polo Championships in 1999 and 2000, and became the school's all-time leader with 700 saves. He was also a three-time All-MPSF honoree (2000, 2001 and 2002).

Brooks was a walked-on to UCLA basketball team his freshman year. He graduated from UCLA in 2005 with a degree in sociology.

== Olympic Games ==
In the summer 2004 Olympic Games, Brooks, Adam Wright and Brett Ormsby, two former UCLA teammates, competed for Team USA in Athens Greece. He was a member of 2008 Water Polo Team USA. In the gold medal championship match, Brooks had four saves and helped the USA team to win the silver medal, losing to Hungary 14–10. He was a big cheerleader on the bench for the United States team.

== Coaching ==
During his three years as the head women's water polo coach at UCLA, Brooks' team has won two MPSF Tournament championships. In the 2012 tournament title game, the team defeated Stanford 8–7 in overtime, and he was rewarded with the Mountain Pacific Sports Federation (MPSF) Coach of the Year honor.

== See also ==
- List of Olympic medalists in water polo (men)
- List of men's Olympic water polo tournament goalkeepers
