= Tony van Dorp =

Dutch-American water polo player

Personal information
- Nationality: Dutch, American
- Born: Anton Ludwig van Dorp; 25 June 1936 Batavia, Dutch East Indies
- Died: 24 October 2010 (aged 74)
- Height: 1.96 m (6 ft 5 in)
- Weight: 91 kg (201 lb)

Sport
- Sport: Water polo
- Club: Phillips 66, Long Beach
Medal record
Representing United States
Pan American Games
Gold medal – first place	1967 Winnipeg	Men's tournament

Anton Ludwig "Tony" van Dorp (25 May 1936 – 24 November 2010) was a Dutch-American water polo goalkeeper. He was born in Batavia, Dutch East Indies, to Dutch parents and played in the Netherlands and for the Dutch national team until 1963. However, since 1957 he lived most of the time in the United States and had the US citizenship. Thus he competed in the 1964 and 1968 Summer Olympics for the United States. He then played for the club Phillips 66, Long Beach, and became AAU All-American in 1964–68. In 1967, his team won the Pan American Games where he stopped 50% of penalty shots and was named the outstanding goalkeeper of the tournament. Beside water polo, he served for 21 years as an air traffic controller with the US Air Force in the US, Germany, and Vietnam.

His younger brother, Fred van Dorp, was also a water polo player, who participated in the 1960, 1964 and 1968 Olympics for the Netherlands, and played against his brother. One anecdote on this rivalry says that in the 1964 game, while Fred was preparing for a penalty shot, Tony thought that "Fred knows that I know that he always shoots to his right, so he will go to his left, and I'll play it that way. But then I thought that he would also realize this and not shoot to his left, so I went to his right … and there was the ball."

In 1982, he was inducted into the USA Water Polo Hall of Fame.

Tony van Dorp died of old age in 2010 and was survived by his three children, Fred, Helen, Kristie, and four grandchildren.

== International senior tournaments ==
- 1964 Summer Olympics (Tokyo, Japan, 9th position)
- 1967 Pan American Games (Winnipeg, Canada, gold medal)
- 1968 Summer Olympics (Mexico City, Mexico, 5th position)

== See also ==
- List of men's Olympic water polo tournament goalkeepers
