= Merrill Moses =

American water polo player (born 1977)

Personal information
- Born: August 13, 1977 (age 48) Harbor City, California, U.S.
- Home town: Rancho Palos Verdes, California
- Education: Pepperdine University
- Height: 6 ft 3 in (191 cm)
- Weight: 215 lb (98 kg)

Sport
- Country: United States
- Sport: Water polo
- Position: Goalkeeper
- University team: Pepperdine Waves
Medal record
Men's water polo
Representing the United States
Olympic Games
Silver medal – second place	2008 Beijing	Team
FINA World League
Bronze medal – third place	2003 New York	Team
Silver medal – second place	2008 Genoa	Team
Silver medal – second place	2016 Huizhou	Team
Pan American Games
Gold medal – first place	2007 Rio de Janeiro	Team
Gold medal – first place	2011 Guadalajara	Team
Gold medal – first place	2015 Toronto	Team

Merrill M. Moses (born August 13, 1977) is a United States Olympic silver medalist, three-time Olympian, and three-time Pan American Games gold medalist water polo goalkeeper. He played college water polo for Pepperdine University, where he was an All-American and helped lead the team to the 1997 NCAA Men's Water Polo Championship. Moses is now associate head coach in water polo at Pepperdine.

== Early and personal life ==
Moses was born in Harbor City, California, to Max, an orthopedic surgeon, and Marlene Moses. He is Jewish. He grew up in Rancho Palos Verdes, California. He is an Eagle Scout. He has five older siblings. Moses has a six-foot-eight-inch wingspan.

He and his wife Laura have three children, Adrianna Nicole, Makenna Merrill, and Brooklyn Ann. The family lives in Newbury Park, California.

== Water polo career ==
=== High school ===
Moses attended Peninsula High School ('95). As a teenager, he switched from football to water polo, and moved to goalkeeper in his sophomore year. While he was in high school, Moses was the Bay League MVP and an All-California Interscholastic Federation Southern Section selection as a senior, and competed with the US Junior National Team. He was named a first team All-American his junior and senior years.

=== College ===
Moses attended Pepperdine University ('99) on a full scholarship and was the starting goalkeeper in water polo for four seasons for the Pepperdine Waves from 1995-98. In 1995 he made 165 saves. He was All-American honorable mention in 1996 (when he made 218 saves), first team in 1997 (207 saves), and second team in 1998 (224 saves). He was also All-Mountain Pacific Sports Federation all four years, and 1997 MPSF Goalkeeper of the Year. He helped lead Pepperdine to the 1997 NCAA Men's Water Polo Championship, and was named Conference Player of the Year, game and team MVP, and all-NCAA Tournament first team. He graduated from Pepperdine in 1999 with a degree in public relations.

=== Team USA ===
He first became a member of the USA Men's National Water Polo Team in 1997. Moses was the starting goalkeeper for Team USA at the 2008, 2012, and 2016 Olympics. He was a goalkeeper on the team at the 2008 Beijing Olympics, making 70 saves in the tournament. In the championship game, the USA team won the silver medal, defeated by Hungary. He was named to the Olympic All-Star Team.

In December 2010, Moses' Olympic silver medal was stolen by thieves when his parents' house was burglarized. The thieves also stole both a ring and a watch that he had been given by the US Olympic Committee.

Moses was also on Team USA at the London 2012 Olympic Games, at which he made 63 saves and the team came in 8th. He was also on Team USA at the Rio 2016 Olympic Games, at which the team came in 10th.

Moses won gold medals with Team USA at the 2007 (30 saves), 2011 (36 saves; stopping over 65% of shots), and 2015 Pan American Games.

He played at the Water Polo World Championships in 2003, 2005, 2007, 2009, 2011, 2013, and 2015, with his top finish being 4th in 2009.

Moses won a bronze medal at the 2003 FINA World League Super Final, a silver medal at the 2008 FINA World League Super Final (in which he made 37 saves), and a silver medal at the 2016 FINA World League Super Final.

=== International ===
Moses played for Club Olivar of Zaragosa, Spain, in the Spanish professional league in 2000-01. From 2008-09 he played professionally for VK Šibenik, Croatia, winning the Yellow Cap Award for being the most consistent player in the Croatian First League of Water Polo, and from 2009-11 he played for Sportiva Nervi, Italy.

He won the Best Goalkeeper Award in the 2006 Swimming Union of the Americas (ASUA) Cup.

Moses was named the 2007 Premier League Best Goalkeeper while playing for the New York Athletic Club, as well as MVP of the 2010 USA Water Polo Men's National Championships.

=== Coaching ===
In 2012 he served as co-Head Coach at Pepperdine University. Moses is now associate head coach in water polo at Pepperdine.

=== Honors ===
Moses was inducted into the New York Athletic Club Hall of Fame in 2009, and into the Pepperdine Athletics Hall of Fame in 2013. In 2015 he was inducted into the Southern California Jewish Sports Hall of Fame. In 2018 he was inducted into the Jewish Sports Heritage Association Hall of Fame in New York.

== See also ==
- List of Olympic medalists in water polo (men)
- List of men's Olympic water polo tournament goalkeepers
- List of select Jewish water polo players
