= Gordie Hall =

American water polo player (born 1935)

Personal information
- Born: Gordon Randall Hall; November 27, 1935 (age 90) Long Beach, California, United States
- Height: 185 cm (6 ft 1 in)
- Weight: 88 kg (194 lb)
- Children: 3

Sport
- Sport: Water polo
- Position: Center Forward (Jordan High); Center Back (College); Goalkeeper (60 Olympics)
- College team: Compton College; University of California Berkeley
- Club: Lynwood Swim Club
- Coached by: Edward Holston (Compton); Neal Kohlhase, Urho Saari (Olympics)
Medal record
Representing United States
Pan American Games
Silver medal – second place	1963 Sao Paulo	Men's tournament

Gordon "Gordie" Randall Hall (born November 27, 1935) is former American water polo player who competed for UC Berkeley and participated in the 1960 Summer Olympics in Rome where the U.S. team placed seventh. He later worked in aerospace engineering.

== Early life ==
Hall was born in Long Beach, California on November 27, 1935. He competed as a Center Forward in water polo for Long Beach Jordan High School from 1950-1953. Recognized in water polo in three successive years from 1950-1952, he made First Team honors in the All-Coast League, and was a 1951, and 1952 Most Valuable Player.

== College athletics ==
Hall studied first at Compton College where he competed on the swim and water polo teams under Head Coach Edward Holston from 1953-1955. After transferring to UC Berkeley, Hall played Center Back on the water polo team from around 1954-1957. During college, in all three years from 1954-1956, he was a member of teams that won the Northern California League Championship, and was voted the Northern California League's Most Valuable Player in 1956.

== 1960 Olympic trials ==
In July, 1960, Hall qualified for the Olympic team, while playing for the Lynwood Swim Club under Head Coach Neal Kolhase at the Los Angeles Swim Stadium. The Lynwood Club went undefeated in trail competitions, defeating the Los Angeles Swim Stadium team, and the El Segundo Swim Club teams. Team mate Ron Vollmer had attended Compton college with Gordie, and Olympic team mate Bob Horn would later coach water polo at UCLA and serve as a U.S. Olympic water polo coach.

== 1960 Rome Olympics ==
Hall was a member of the American water polo team which finished seventh in the 1960 Olympic tournament. He played three matches as goalkeeper under Neal Kohlhase and Assistant Olympic Coach Urho Saari. The team from Italy won the gold, Russia took the silver, and perennial favorite Hungary took the bronze.

In non-Olympic international competition, Hall was a member of the U.S. National team that won a silver medal at the 1963 Pan American Games in São Paulo, Brazil.

During the span of his water polo career competing in AAU competition from 1956-1964, he usually played goalkeeper, and competed on teams that won National championships in four successive years from 1960-1963.

=== Life outside water polo ===
Hall later worked in Aerospace Engineering, and as a consulting aerospace engineer. After leaving his aerospace careers, he settled in Maui, Hawaii and sold real estate. He competed in outrigger canoes during his time in Hawaii, and trained in outrigger canoe competition with the United States Masters's organization.

=== Hall of Fame ===
In 2000, Hall was inducted into the USA Water Polo Hall of Fame.

== See also ==
- List of men's Olympic water polo tournament goalkeepers
