= Sean Nolan (water polo) =

American water polo player (born 1972)

Personal information
- Full name: Sean M. Nolan
- Nationality: American
- Born: July 18, 1972 (age 54) Palo Alto, California, United States
- Occupation: Water Polo Coach
- Height: 198 cm (6 ft 6 in)
- Weight: 92 kg (203 lb)
- Spouse: Kris Koblik (2011)

Sport
- Sport: Water polo
- Position: Goalkeeper
- College team: University of California Berkeley
- Coached by: Harlan Harkness (Palo Alto High); Steve Heaston (U. Cal. Berkeley); John Vargas (Olympics)
Medal record
Men's Water polo
Representing United States
Summer Universiade
Gold medal – first place	1993 Buffalo	Team
Pan American Games
Gold medal – first place	1999 Winnipeg	Team
- Updated on 10 August 2023

Sean Nolan (born July 18, 1972) is a former American water polo goalkeeper who competed for the University of California Berkeley. He participated in the men's water plo tournament at the 2000 Summer Olympics in Sydney that placed sixth overall. After graduating Berkeley in 1995, he played professional water polo for a season, and later coached water polo at his alma mater, the University of California.

== Early life ==
Nolan was born July 18, 1972 in Palo Alto, California and competed in water polo for Palo Alto High School, a public school with strong academics and over twenty varsity athletic teams. As a Freshman, Nolan played soccer for Palo Alto where he was also a goalie. In water polo at Palo Alto High, Nolan was coached by Harlan Harkness, and made the All-Peninsula water polo first team for the Peninsula Times-Tribune as a High School Junior in November 1988. A strong water polo goalie, he was credited with a total of 27 saves in two matches against Bellarmine High School in the California Central Section semi-final match in 1988 before having to leave the game due to an eye injury. Palo Alto later won the Santa Clara Valley Athletic League Title on November 8, 1988 by a score of 14-8 against Mountain View High School. Under the direction of Coach Harkness, Nolan's High School team reached the semi-finals of the California Central Section championship all four years of his time as a player. Nolan trained with Stanford's team in the summer of 1989, and was known for strong vertical jumping ability, height, agility, and great swimming skills. During Nolan's Senior year, Palo Alto claimed their first California Central Section Division 4A Championship on November 25, 1989 with Nolan contributing as goalkeeper, and claiming the title of Athlete of the Week from the Peninsula Times-Tribune.

== University of California Berkeley ==
Peter J. Cutino Award

Though considered a top recruit for Stanford, Nolan attended the University of California Berkeley where he played water polo from 1992-1994 under Berkeley Head Coach Steve Heaston, a USA Water Polo Hall of Fame recipient. Nolan won the Peter J. Cutino Award as the best male collegiate player of the year in 1992.

In the 1992-1994 seasons, Nolan received All-American honors in each of three years, and was part of the Berkeley water polo team that won NCAA national titles in the 1991 and 1992 seasons. In the 1992 NCAA Championship game against Stanford, Nolan made two blocks on goal shots that helped U. Cal win the game 12-11 in a very close overtime game. In 1994, Nolan was named U. Cal Berkeley's most valuable player. Graduating Berkeley in 1995, Nolan majored in Industrial Nation's Political Economies.

From 1994-2000, Nolan played with the US Senior National water polo team. In international competition, at the 1993 World University Games in New York, he won a team gold medal. At the 1997 Unicon Cup in Budapest, He received honors as Goalie of the Tournament. Notably he was part of the U.S. national team that took a team gold medal in Winnipeg, Ontario at the 1999 Pan America games.

== 2000 Sydney Olympics ==
Nolan participated in water polo for the U.S. team at the 2000 Summer Olympics in Sydney where the U.S. team placed sixth overall, under Head Coach John Vargas, who had coached water polo at Stanford. Former U. Cal. Berkeley players on the U.S. team included Chris Humbert, Gavin Arroyo, and Chris Oeding. Pre-Olympic favorite Hungary took the gold medal, the Russian Federation took the silver, and a strong team from Yugoslavia took the bronze. The 2000 semi-final games were close matches, with Hungary beating Serbia/Montenegro by 8-7, and Russia defeating Spain by the same score. In the final game between Hungary and Russia, Hungary led after each of the first three quarter by scores of 3-1, 8-2, and 10-4. Hungary won by the end of play with a final score of 13-6, taking their first gold medal since the 1976 games Montréal. As noted, Russia took the silver.

In career pursuits after graduating Berkeley, Nolan played professionally for the Greek water polo team Naok on the Island of Corfu in the 1996-1997 season. He worked as a coach for goalkeepers at U. Cal., and served as a Director for goalkeepers with USA Water Polo.

While continuing to serve as a water polo coach at U. Cal., Nolan married Kris Koblik. Koblik had played water polo at Stanford, and was a history teacher at Diablo Valley College.

== See also ==
- List of men's Olympic water polo tournament goalkeepers
