= Chay Lapin =

American water polo player (born 1987)

Personal information
- Born: Chay Thomas Lapin; February 25, 1987 (age 39) Fountain Valley, California
- Height: 6 ft 6 in (1.98 m)

Sport
- Country: United States
- Sport: Water Polo
Medal record
Men's water polo
Representing the United States
Pan American Games
Gold medal – first place	2011 Guadalajara	Team competition

Chay Thomas Lapin (born February 25, 1987) is an American water polo goalkeeper. While playing at the University of California, Los Angeles, he set the school's all-time saves record. He also played for the United States national team at the 2012 Summer Olympics.

== Career ==
=== High school ===
Lapin played water polo at Long Beach Wilson High School from 2001 to 2004. In 2004, he was named to the California-Hawaii All-America first team and was also named the CIF player of the year.

=== College ===
Lapin then went to UCLA, where he redshirted the 2005 season. In 2006, he started 15 games at goalkeeper and had a 4.87 goals against average. The following year, he started 21 games, had a 6.90 goals against average, and was named to the ACWPC All-America third team.

Lapin started 23 games in 2008. He had 206 saves and a 6.35 goals against average. In 2009, he started 24 games, made 205 saves, and had a 4.82 goals against average. His performance helped UCLA win the MPSF Tournament and reach the finals of the NCAA Championship that year. Lapin was named to the ACWPC All-America second team. He finished his college career with 719 total saves, which set a school record.

=== International ===
Lapin was a backup goalkeeper for the U.S. national team at the 2011 and 2012 FINA World League Super Finals. Both times, the U.S. finished in fourth place. He was also a member of the U.S. men's team that earned gold in water polo at the 2011 Pan-American games. At the 2012 Summer Olympics, he made eight saves, and the U.S. placed eighth.

== Personal life ==
Lapin was born in Fountain Valley, California, on February 25, 1987. He is 6 feet, 6 and a half inches tall. He resides in Redondo Beach, California.

== See also ==
- List of men's Olympic water polo tournament goalkeepers
