= Ralph Budelman =

American water polo player (1918–2002)

- Budelman, age 30 in USA team jersey, circa 1948

Personal information
- Full name: Ralph Neil Budelman
- Nationality: American
- Born: April 19, 1918 Chicago, Illinois, U.S.
- Died: October 24, 2002 (aged 84) Palm City, Florida, U.S.
- Occupations: Sports Management; Excavating business management

Sport
- Sport: Water polo
- Club: Illinois Athletic Club (IAC)
- Coached by: Sam Greller (IAC); Austin Clapp (48 Olymics)

Ralph Neil Budelman (April 19, 1918 – October 24, 2002) was an American water polo player who competed for the Illinois Athletic Club, and participated in the men's tournament at the 1948 Summer Olympics where he played goaltender.

Budelman was born April 19, 1918, in Chicago, Illinois. During most of his water polo career, from 1936 to 1955, he competed for the Illinois Athletic Club primarily under Coach Sam Greller, a Water Polo Hall of Fame inductee. Budelman played on water polo teams that won national indoor championships in 1940–41, 1948–49, 1952, and 1955, and that won national outdoor championships in 1951 and 1953.

Budelman was a WWII era veteran of the US Navy.

== 1948 London Olympics ==
He participated in the 1948 Summer Olympics in the men's water polo tournament under Head Olympic Coach Austin Clapp in London, where the American team finished ninth. Though the U.S. won their first game against the team from Uruguay 7–0, and then had a tie game with the strong team from Belgium that ended in a score of 4–4, they lost their critical match with Sweden in a 7–0 shutout, and were eliminated from further rounds. Budelman played goaltender during the 1948 Olympic games, and played a strong game in the winning shutout against Uruguay. Italy won the gold medal, and Hungary the silver, and the Netherlands won the bronze in a period when European teams, particularly Eastern European teams, dominated international water polo.

=== Honors ===
In 1979, he was inducted into the USA Water Polo Hall of Fame and is a member of the Illinois Water Polo Hall of Fame.

=== Careers ===
In professional pursuits, he founded and owned his own excavating company, Chicago's Ralph N. Budelman Co., responsible largely for digging areas for construction projects. He was a Director of Hinsdale's First National Bank, and in sports management directed the Hinsdale Golf Club and the Chicago Boys Club. Hinsdale, Illinois is an upscale city about 20 miles West of downtown Chicago. He helped with Mayor Daley's organizing committee for the 1959 Pan American Games held in Chicago.

Continuing an interest in sports management, in later life he served as a President of the Illinois Athletic Club. In service to the Olympic community, he served as a President of the U.S. Olympians, Midwest chapter.

Budelman died October 24, 2002, in Palm City, Florida. He was survived by four children.

== See also ==
- List of men's Olympic water polo tournament goalkeepers
