= Christopher Duplanty =

American water polo player (born 1965)

Personal information
- Full name: Christopher David Duplanty
- Born: October 21, 1965 (age 60) Palo Alto, California, U.S.
- Occupation: Director of Sales
- Height: 190 cm (6 ft 3 in)
- Weight: 95 kg (209 lb)

Sport
- Sport: Swimming, Water Polo
- Position: goalkeeper (WP)
- College team: University of California Irvine (UCI)
- Club: Newport Water Polo Foundation
- Coached by: Ted Newland (UCI); Bill Barnett ('88, '92 Olympics); Richard Corso ('96 Olympics)
Medal record
Men's water polo
Representing the United States
Olympic Games
Silver medal – second place	1988 Seoul	Men's water polo

Christopher David "Chris" Duplanty (born October 21, 1965, in Palo Alto, California) is a former water polo goalkeeper from the United States, who competed in three Summer Olympics (1988, 1992 and 1996) for his native country. He won the silver medal with the US Men's National Team at the 1988 Summer Olympics in Seoul, South Korea. In 2001, he was inducted into the USA Water Polo Hall of Fame.

Chris Duplanty was born October 21, 1965, in Palo Alto, California. Growing up in Hawaii, he attended the Punahou School in Honolulu, where he was a four-year water polo and swimming athlete, graduating in 1984. While at Punahou, he was a recipient of All American honors in three years, and recognized as an Athlete of the Year. He earned letters in swimming all four years of his High School participation, and won the 100-meter freestyle Hawaii state championship.

== University of California Irvine ==
At the University of California Irvine, where he graduated in 1989, Duplanty was an All American in three years, and was part of the 1989 water polo team that won the national NCAA championship. In addition to playing water polo, Duplanty was a varsity swim team member four years. His primary coach in water polo at UC Irvine was Ted Newland, who led the Anteaters from 1966 to 2004, winning three national championships during his tenure.

In water polo club competition, Duplanty competed with the Newport Water Polo Foundation beginning in 1984 where he was managed by familiar coaches Ted Newland and Bill Barnett.

== Olympics 1988-96 ==
He won the silver medal in the Olympic Men's water polo competition with the US Men's National Team at the 1988 Summer Olympics in Seoul, South Korea where he was trained and managed by men's Head Olympic Coach for water polo Bill Barnett. At the 1988 Olympics, pre-Olympic water polo favorite Yugoslavia and the U.S. team were part of group play in their first Olympic match, where the U.S. bettered Yugoslavia 7–6. But Yugoslavia performed better in the remaining rounds of group play, with the U.S. team recording a loss to Spain in a score of 9–7. With more overall goals scored, the Yugoslavian and U.S. teams both advanced to the semi-final rounds, where they each won their first match and were later paired in the final match for the gold medal. The U.S. final match with Yugoslavia was tied 6–6 in regular play, but in overtime Yugoslavia took a 9–6 lead making the first three goals, and later won the gold medal with a 9–7 overtime win. The team from the Soviet Union took the bronze, and the West German team placed fourth.

With Bill Barnett again serving as Head Coach, Duplanty participated with the U.S. men's water polo team in the August, 1992 Barcelona Olympics where the U.S. team placed fourth, with Italy taking the gold, Spain taking the silver, and the Unified team taking the bronze.

As one of the more experienced participants, he served as a team captain on the men's water polo team at the 1996 Atlanta Olympics, where the U.S. team placed seventh overall, with Spain taking the gold, Croatia taking the silver, and Italy taking the bronze. As part of the 1996 Atlanta water polo team, Duplanty was managed and trained by Head Coach Richard Corso. Duplanty earned the honor of "Most Dominant Goalie" in 1996 by earning the highest number of saves, and the highest percentage of goals saved from scoring.

=== International competition highlights ===
Duplanty was a member of the U.S. National Water polo team from 1987 to 1998.

In international competition, Duplanty captured a gold in the 1995 Pan American games in Buenos Aires and a silver in the 1991 Pan American games in Havana. He participated with the U.S. team in the 1991 FINA World Cup in Spain that won the gold medal and the 1997 FINA World Cup that won the gold in Athens.

=== Career pursuits ===
Duplanty has served as a Liaison to the Olympic committee, between the board of directors and the Olympic assembly, and served in various capacities for the Olympic committee for ten years. In 1992, he competed a Masters in Business Administration from U.C. Irvine. In the U.S. women's first Olympic water polo competition, Duplanty served as an assistant coach, helping them earn a silver medal. He has served in sales as a director for the swimwear company Arena North America.

=== Honors ===
Demonstrating academic achievement, Duplanty was chosen a Scholar Athlete of the Year for UC Irvine while receiving his master's degree in Business Administration in 1989. He was a Scholar-Athlete of the Year in the Big West Conference. In 1984, as a Senior at the Punahou School, he was named a C. Dudley Pratt Athlete of the Year.

In 2001, Duplanty was inducted into the USA Water Polo Hall of Fame, and is a member of the Hawaii Sports Hall of Fame, and a 2024 member of the Hawaii Waterman Hall of Fame. He is a 2008 member of the Punahou School Hall of Fame, and was made a member of the UC Irvine Hall of Fame in 2003.

== See also ==
- List of Olympic medalists in water polo (men)
- List of men's Olympic water polo tournament goalkeepers
