= List of United States men's Olympic water polo team rosters =

This article contains lists of the United States men's national water polo team rosters at the Summer Olympics. The lists are updated as of March 30, 2020.

== Abbreviations ==
#	Ordering by name	No.	Cap number	Ref	Reference		
(C)	Captain	H	Handedness	L	Left-handed	R	Right-handed
Pos	Playing position	FP	Field player	GK	Goalkeeper		
CB	Center back (2-meter defense)	CF	Center forward (2-meter offense)	D	Driver (attacker)	U	Utility (except goalkeeper)

== Rosters by tournament ==
Men's water polo tournaments have been staged at the Olympic Games since 1900. The United States has participated in 22 of 27 tournaments.

=== 1900 Summer Olympics ===
- Maximum number of entries and participants: 1 team of 7 players and 4 reserves per club
- Number of participating nations: 4
- Host city: (France) Paris
- Final Ranking: Did not participate

=== 1904 Summer Olympics ===
- Maximum number of entries and participants: 1 team of 7 players per club
- Number of participating nations: 1
- Host city: (United States) St. Louis
- New York Athletic Club
  - Final Ranking: 1st place ( (gold) Gold medal)
  - Head coach: (United States) Gus Sundstrom

#	Player	Pos	H	Height	Weight	Birthplace	Birthdate	Age	College	Ref
1	David Bratton					(United States) New York, New York	Oct 1869			
2	Budd Goodwin	FP				(United States) New York, New York	Nov 13, 1883	20 years, 297 days		
3	Louis Handley	FP				(Italy) Rome	Feb 14, 1874	30 years, 204 days		
4	David Hesser	FP					Jan 1884			
5	Joe Ruddy	FP				(United States) New York, New York	Sep 28, 1878	25 years, 343 days		
6	James Steen						Nov 19, 1876	27 years, 291 days		
7	George Van Cleaf	FP		5 ft 8 in (1.73 m)	146 lb (66 kg)	(United States) Northfield, New York	Oct 8, 1879	24 years, 333 days		

- Chicago Athletic Association
  - Final Ranking: 2nd place ( (silver) Silver medal)
  - Head coach: (United States) Alex Meffert

#	Player	Pos	H	Height	Weight	Birthplace	Birthdate	Age	College	Ref
1	Rex Beach					(United States) Atwood, Michigan	Sep 1, 1877	27 years, 5 days	Rollins	
2	David Hammond					(United States) Chicago, Illinois	Jan 5, 1881	23 years, 245 days		
3	Charles Healy					(United States) Chicago, Illinois	Oct 4, 1883	20 years, 338 days		
4	Frank Kehoe									
5	Jerome Steever					(United States) Milwaukee, Wisconsin	Jan 7, 1880	24 years, 243 days		
6	Edwin Swatek					(United States) Chicago, Illinois	Jan 7, 1885	19 years, 243 days		
7	Bill Tuttle					(United States) Chicago, Illinois	Feb 21, 1882	22 years, 198 days		

- Missouri Athletic Club
  - Final Ranking: 3rd place ( (bronze) Bronze medal)
  - Head coach: N/A

#	Player	Pos	H	Height	Weight	Birthplace	Birthdate	Age	College	Ref
1	Gwynne Evans					(United States) (Unknown), Missouri	Sep 3, 1880	24 years, 2 days		
2	Gus Goessling					(United States) St. Louis, Missouri	Nov 17, 1878	25 years, 293 days		
3	John Meyers					(United States) Cincinnati, Ohio	Jun 28, 1880	24 years, 69 days		
4	Bill Orthwein					(United States) St. Louis, Missouri	Oct 16, 1881	22 years, 325 days	Yale	
5	Amedee Reyburn					(United States) St. Louis, Missouri	Mar 25, 1879	25 years, 164 days		
6	Frank Schreiner					(United States) St. Louis, Missouri	Mar 24, 1879	25 years, 165 days		
7	Manfred Toeppen					(United States) St. Louis, Missouri	Sep 3, 1887	17 years, 2 days		

=== 1908 Summer Olympics ===
- Maximum number of entries and participants: 1 team of 7 players per club
- Number of participating nations: 4
- Host city: (United Kingdom) London
- Final Ranking: Did not participate

=== 1912 Summer Olympics ===
- Maximum number of entries and participants: 1 team of 7 players and 4 reserves per club
- Number of participating nations: 6
- Host city: (Sweden) Stockholm
- Final Ranking: Did not participate

=== 1920 Summer Olympics ===
- Maximum number of entries and participants: 1 team of 7 players and 4 reserves per nation
- Number of participating nations: 12
- Host city: (Belgium) Antwerp
- Final Ranking: 4th place
- Head coach: (United States) Otto Wahle

#	Player	Pos	H	Height	Weight	Birthplace	Birthdate	Age	College	Ref
1	Clement Browne			5 ft 9 in (1.75 m)		(British Leeward Islands) Freetown, Antigua	Jan 4, 1896	24 years, 233 days		
2	James Carson	FP				(United States) San Francisco, California	Jul 30, 1901	19 years, 25 days		
3	Harry Hebner (C)	FP		5 ft 10.5 in (1.79 m)		(United States) Chicago, Illinois	Jun 15, 1891	29 years, 70 days		
4	Sophus Jensen			5 ft 10.5 in (1.79 m)		(United States) Chicago, Illinois	Jul 27, 1889	31 years, 28 days		
5	Mike McDermott	FP				(United States) Chicago, Illinois	Jan 18, 1893	27 years, 219 days		
6	Perry McGillivray	FP		5 ft 6.5 in (1.69 m)		(United States) Chicago, Illinois	Aug 5, 1893	27 years, 19 days	Univ. of Illinois	
7	Norman Ross			6 ft 2 in (1.88 m)		(United States) Portland, Oregon	May 2, 1896	24 years, 114 days		
8	Preston Steiger					(United States) San Francisco, California	Sep 6, 1898	21 years, 353 days		
9	Herbert Taylor			5 ft 6.5 in (1.69 m)		(United States) Chicago, Illinois	Jun 7, 1892	28 years, 78 days	Univ. of Wisconsin	
10	Herb Vollmer	FP		6 ft 0 in (1.83 m)		(United States) New York, New York	Feb 15, 1895	25 years, 191 days	Columbia	
11	William Vosburgh	FP		5 ft 7.5 in (1.71 m)		(United States) Oak Park, Illinois	Dec 16, 1890	29 years, 252 days	Univ. of Illinois	

- Note:
  - Duke Kahanamoku and Clyde Swendsen might be reserves or alternates. They did not compete in this tournament.

=== 1924 Summer Olympics ===
- Maximum number of entries and participants: 1 team of 7 players and 4 reserves per nation
- Number of participating nations: 13
- Host city: (France) Paris
- Final Ranking: 3rd place ( (bronze) Bronze medal)
- Head coach: (United States) Harry Hebner (did not go) (Note: Harry Hebner was appointed head coach for the 1924 games, but he did not go due to business commitment.) / (United States) Otto Wahle

#	Player	Pos	H	Height	Weight	Birthplace	Birthdate	Age	College	Ref
1	Art Austin	FP				(United States) Oakland, California	Jul 8, 1902	22 years, 5 days	Stanford	
2	Elmer Collett	GK				(United States) San Francisco, California	1903		Stanford	
3	Jam Handy	FP				(United States) Philadelphia, Pennsylvania	Mar 6, 1886	38 years, 129 days	Univ. of Michigan	
4	Oliver Horn	FP		5 ft 10 in (1.78 m)		(United States) St. Louis, Missouri	Jun 22, 1901	23 years, 21 days		
5	Fred Lauer	GK				(United States) Chicago, Illinois	Oct 13, 1898	25 years, 274 days		
6	George Mitchell	FP				(United States) San Francisco, California	Apr 23, 1901	23 years, 81 days	UC Berkeley	
7	John Norton	FP				(United States) New York, New York	Nov 27, 1899	24 years, 229 days		
8	Wally O'Connor	FP				(United States) Madera, California	Aug 25, 1903	20 years, 323 days	Stanford	
9	George Schroth	FP		6 ft 4 in (1.93 m)		(United States) Sacramento, California	Dec 31, 1899	24 years, 195 days	Saint Mary's	
10	Herb Vollmer (C)	FP		6 ft 0 in (1.83 m)		(United States) New York, New York	Feb 15, 1895	29 years, 149 days	Columbia	
11	Johnny Weissmuller	FP		6 ft 3 in (1.91 m)	190 lb (86 kg)	(Austria-Hungary) Freidorf (Szabadfalva)	Jun 2, 1904	20 years, 41 days		

- Note:
  - The 11 players above were all listed in page 488, 490, 494 and 496 of the Official Report of the 1924 Olympic Games (page 486, 488, 492 and 494 of the PDF document).
  - Telford Cann and Harold Kruger might be reserves or alternates. They did not compete in this tournament. The official report of the International Olympic Committee did not count them as competitors or medalists.

=== 1928 Summer Olympics ===
- Maximum number of entries and participants: 1 team of 7 players and 4 reserves per nation
- Number of participating nations: 14
- Host city: (Netherlands) Amsterdam
- Final Ranking: 7th place
- Head coach: (United States) Perry McGillivray

#	Player	Pos	H	Height	Weight	Birthplace	Birthdate	Age	College	Ref
1	John Cattus	GK								
2	Harry Daniels	GK				(United States) Boston, Massachusetts	Jun 23, 1900	28 years, 44 days		
3	Joseph Farley	FP							Fordham	
4	Richard Greenberg	FP				(United States) Chicago, Illinois	Jun 13, 1902	26 years, 54 days		
5	Sam Greller	FP				(United States) Chicago, Illinois	May 18, 1905	23 years, 80 days	Univ. of Iowa	
6	George Mitchell (C)	FP				(United States) San Francisco, California	Apr 23, 1901	27 years, 105 days	UC Berkeley	
7	Wally O'Connor	FP				(United States) Madera, California	Aug 25, 1903	24 years, 347 days	Stanford	
8	Paul Samson	FP		6 ft 5.5 in (1.97 m)	251 lb (114 kg)	(United States) Emporia, Kansas	Jun 12, 1905	23 years, 55 days	Univ. of Michigan	
9	George Schroth	FP		6 ft 4 in (1.93 m)		(United States) Sacramento, California	Dec 31, 1899	28 years, 219 days	Saint Mary's	
10	Herbert Topp	FP				(Denmark) Copenhagen	Apr 20, 1900	28 years, 108 days		
11	Johnny Weissmuller	FP		6 ft 3 in (1.91 m)	190 lb (86 kg)	(Austria-Hungary) Freidorf (Szabadfalva)	Jun 2, 1904	24 years, 65 days		

- Note:
  - The 11 players above were all listed in page 765, 811 and 815 of the Official Report of the 1928 Olympic Games (page 757, 803 and 807 of the PDF document).
  - Ogden Driggs, Reginald Harrison, Fred Lauer and David Young might be reserves or alternates. They did not compete in this tournament. The official report of the International Olympic Committee did not count them as competitors.

=== 1932 Summer Olympics ===
- Maximum number of entries and participants: 1 team of 7 players and 4 reserves per nation
- Number of participating nations: 5
- Host city: (United States) Los Angeles
- Final Ranking: 3rd place ( (bronze) Bronze medal)
- Head coach: (United States) Frank Rivas

#	Player	Pos	H	Height	Weight	Birthplace	Birthdate	Age	College	Ref
1	Austin Clapp	FP				(United States) Farmington, New Hampshire	Nov 8, 1910	21 years, 272 days	Stanford	
2	Phil Daubenspeck	FP				(United States) Los Angeles, California	Oct 28, 1905	26 years, 283 days		
3	Charley Finn	FP				(United States) Bakersfield, California	Jul 28, 1897	35 years, 9 days		
4	Harold McCallister	FP				(United States) Madison, South Dakota	Oct 14, 1903	28 years, 297 days	Stanford	
5	Wally O'Connor (C)	FP				(United States) Madera, California	Aug 25, 1903	28 years, 347 days	Stanford	
6	Cal Strong	FP				(United States) Jacksonville, Illinois	Aug 12, 1907	24 years, 360 days	Stanford	
7	Herb Wildman	GK				(United States) Marion, Ohio	Sep 6, 1912	19 years, 335 days		

- Note:
  - The 7 players above were all listed in page 607, 629, 630, 631, 632 and 633 of the Official Report of the 1932 Olympic Games (page 623, 646, 647, 648, 649 and 650 of the PDF document).
  - David Barclay, Frank Graham, Duke Kahanamoku, Fred Lauer, William O'Connor, Ray Ruddy, Theodore von Hemert and Ted Wiget might be reserves or alternates. They did not compete in this tournament. The official report of the International Olympic Committee did not count them as competitors or medalists.

=== 1936 Summer Olympics ===
- Maximum number of entries and participants: 1 team of 7 players and 4 reserves per nation
- Number of participating nations: 16
- Host city: (Germany) Berlin
- Final Ranking: 9th place
- Head coach: (United States) Clyde Swendsen

#	Player	Pos	H	Height	Weight	Birthplace	Birthdate	Age	College	Ref
1	Kenneth Beck	FP				(United States) Lovelock, Nevada	Apr 19, 1915	21 years, 111 days	USC	
2	Phil Daubenspeck	FP				(United States) Los Angeles, California	Oct 28, 1905	30 years, 285 days		
3	Charley Finn	FP				(United States) Bakersfield, California	Jul 28, 1897	39 years, 11 days		
4	Dixon Fiske	FP				(United States) Esparto, California	Sep 7, 1914	21 years, 336 days	UCLA	
5	Fred Lauer	GK				(United States) Chicago, Illinois	Oct 13, 1898	37 years, 300 days		
6	Harold McCallister	FP				(United States) Madison, South Dakota	Oct 14, 1903	32 years, 299 days	Stanford	
7	Wally O'Connor (C)	FP				(United States) Madera, California	Aug 25, 1903	32 years, 349 days	Stanford	
8	Ray Ruddy	FP				(United States) New York, New York	Aug 31, 1911	24 years, 343 days	Columbia	
9	Herb Wildman	GK				(United States) Marion, Ohio	Sep 6, 1912	23 years, 337 days		

- Note:
  - The 9 players above were all listed in page 984 of the Official Report of the 1936 Olympic Games (page 345 of the PDF document).
  - William Kelly might be a reserve or alternate. He did not compete in this tournament. The official report of the International Olympic Committee did not count him as a competitor.

=== 1948 Summer Olympics ===
- Maximum number of entries and participants: 1 team of 7 players and 4 reserves per nation
- Number of participating nations: 18
- Host city: (United Kingdom) London
- Final Ranking: 11th place
- Head coach: (United States) Austin Clapp

#	Player	Pos	H	Height	Weight	Birthplace	Birthdate	Age	College	Ref
1	Kenneth Beck	FP				(United States) Lovelock, Nevada	Apr 19, 1915	33 years, 102 days	USC	
2	Bob Bray	CF				(United States) Los Angeles, California	Sep 27, 1919	28 years, 307 days	UCLA	
3	Ralph Budelman	GK				(United States) Chicago, Illinois	Apr 19, 1918	30 years, 102 days		
4	Lee Case	FP				(United States) (Unknown), Nebraska	Aug 8, 1917	30 years, 357 days	USC	
5	Chris Christensen	FP				(United States) Hamilton, Iowa	Nov 15, 1918	29 years, 258 days	UCLA	
6	Harold Dash	FP					Jul 22, 1917	31 years, 8 days	Northwestern	
7	Dixon Fiske	FP				(United States) Esparto, California	Sep 7, 1914	33 years, 327 days	UCLA	
8	Edwin Knox (C)	FP				(United States) Arapahoe, Colorado	Jul 24, 1914	34 years, 6 days	UCLA	

- Note:
  - The 8 players above were all listed in page 470 and 472 of the Official Report of the 1948 Olympic Games (page 642 and 644 of the PDF document).
  - John Miller, Donald Tierney and Frank Walton might be reserves or alternates. They did not compete in this tournament. The official report of the International Olympic Committee did not count them as competitors.

=== 1952 Summer Olympics ===
- Maximum number of entries and participants: 1 team of 7 players and 4 reserves per nation
- Number of participating nations: 21
- Host city: (Finland) Helsinki
- Final Ranking: 4th place
- Head coach: (United States) Urho Saari

#	Player	Pos	H	Height	Weight	Birthplace	Birthdate	Age	College	Ref
1	Harry Bisbey	GK				(United States) Santa Monica, California	May 10, 1931	21 years, 76 days	USC	
2	Marvin Burns	FP		6 ft 3.5 in (1.92 m)	205 lb (93 kg)	(United States) Santa Ana, California	Jul 6, 1928	24 years, 19 days	USC	
3	Bill Dornblaser	FP				(United States) Hawthorne, California	Nov 4, 1933	18 years, 264 days	El Camino	
4	Bob Hughes	CF		6 ft 6 in (1.98 m)	225 lb (102 kg)	(United States) Lennox, California	Dec 15, 1930	21 years, 223 days	USC	
5	Edward Jaworski	FP				(United States) New York, New York	Mar 11, 1926	26 years, 136 days	Columbia	
6	Bill Kooistra	FP		5 ft 10.5 in (1.79 m)	174 lb (79 kg)	(United States) Chicago, Illinois	Aug 26, 1926	25 years, 334 days	Northwestern	
7	Norman Lake	FP				(United States) Inglewood, California	Dec 8, 1932	19 years, 230 days	El Camino	
8	Jim Norris (C)	CB		5 ft 10.5 in (1.79 m)	176 lb (80 kg)	(United States) Salt Lake City, Utah	Jul 7, 1930	22 years, 18 days	USC	
9	Jack Spargo	D		5 ft 9 in (1.75 m)		(United States) Hermosa Beach, California	Jun 3, 1931	21 years, 52 days	UCLA	
10	Peter Stange	FP				(United States) Santa Monica, California	Feb 28, 1931	21 years, 148 days	UCLA	

- Note:
  - The 10 players above were all listed in page 599, 600, 603, 604 and 605 of the Official Report of the 1952 Olympic Games (page 602, 603, 606, 607 and 608 of the PDF document).
  - Robert Koehler might be a reserve or alternate. He did not compete in this tournament. The official report of the International Olympic Committee did not count him as a competitor.

=== 1956 Summer Olympics ===
- Maximum number of entries and participants: 1 team of 7 players and 4 reserves per nation
- Number of participating nations: 10
- Host city: (Australia) Melbourne
- Final Ranking: 5th place
- Head coach: (United States) Neil Kohlhase

#	Player	Pos	H	Height	Weight	Birthplace	Birthdate	Age	College	Ref
1	Bob Frojen	FP		5 ft 11 in (1.80 m)	181 lb (82 kg)	(Germany) Hamburg, Hamburg	Dec 1, 1930	25 years, 363 days	Stanford	
2	Jim Gaughran	FP		6 ft 2 in (1.88 m)	185 lb (84 kg)	(United States) San Francisco, California	Jul 5, 1932	24 years, 146 days	Stanford	
3	Ken Hahn	GK		6 ft 0 in (1.83 m)	174 lb (79 kg)	(United States) Chicago, Illinois	Jun 5, 1928	28 years, 176 days	DePaul	
4	Robert Horn	GK		6 ft 2.5 in (1.89 m)	185 lb (84 kg)	(United States) Minneapolis, Minnesota	Nov 1, 1931	25 years, 27 days	Long Beach State	
5	Bob Hughes	CF		6 ft 6 in (1.98 m)	225 lb (102 kg)	(United States) Lennox, California	Dec 15, 1930	25 years, 349 days	USC	
6	Bill Kooistra (C)	FP		5 ft 10.5 in (1.79 m)	174 lb (79 kg)	(United States) Chicago, Illinois	Aug 26, 1926	30 years, 94 days	Northwestern	
7	Sam Kooistra	FP		6 ft 0.5 in (1.84 m)	174 lb (79 kg)	(United States) Chicago, Illinois	Aug 18, 1935	21 years, 102 days	Northwestern	
8	Bill Ross	FP		6 ft 5.5 in (1.97 m)	201 lb (91 kg)	(Canada) Toronto, Ontario	Jul 6, 1928	28 years, 145 days	USC	
9	Ronald Severa	FP		5 ft 10.5 in (1.79 m)	154 lb (70 kg)	(United States) Munden, Kansas	Aug 13, 1936	20 years, 107 days	USC	
10	Wally Wolf	FP		5 ft 10.5 in (1.79 m)	176 lb (80 kg)	(United States) Los Angeles, California	Oct 2, 1930	26 years, 57 days	USC	

- Note:
  - The 10 players above were all listed in page 623 and 624 of the Official Report of the 1956 Olympic Games (page 625 and 626 of the PDF document).
  - Donald Good might be a reserve or alternate. He did not compete in this tournament. The official report of the International Olympic Committee did not count him as a competitor.

=== 1960 Summer Olympics ===
- Maximum number of entries and participants: 1 team of 7 players and 4 reserves per nation
- Number of participating nations: 16
- Host city: (Italy) Rome
- Final Ranking: 7th place
- Head coach: (United States) Neil Kohlhase
- Assistant coach: (United States) Urho Saari

#	Player	Pos	H	Height	Weight	Birthplace	Birthdate	Age	College	Ref
1	Chuck Bittick	FP		6 ft 2 in (1.88 m)	194 lb (88 kg)	(United States) El Reno, Oklahoma	Nov 2, 1939	20 years, 298 days	USC	
2	Marvin Burns	FP		6 ft 3.5 in (1.92 m)	205 lb (93 kg)	(United States) Santa Ana, California	Jul 6, 1928	32 years, 51 days	USC	
3	Ron Crawford	D/CF	R	5 ft 10.5 in (1.79 m)	161 lb (73 kg)	(United States) Brea, California	Dec 6, 1939	20 years, 264 days	Long Beach State	
4	Gordie Hall	GK		6 ft 0.5 in (1.84 m)	194 lb (88 kg)	(United States) Long Beach, California	Nov 27, 1935	24 years, 273 days	UC Berkeley	
5	Robert Horn	GK		6 ft 2.5 in (1.89 m)	185 lb (84 kg)	(United States) Minneapolis, Minnesota	Nov 1, 1931	28 years, 299 days	Long Beach State	
6	Chick McIlroy	D/CF	R	5 ft 10.5 in (1.79 m)	163 lb (74 kg)	(United States) Minot, North Dakota	Aug 1, 1938	22 years, 25 days	Long Beach State	
7	Ronald Severa	FP		5 ft 10.5 in (1.79 m)	154 lb (70 kg)	(United States) Munden, Kansas	Aug 13, 1936	24 years, 13 days	USC	
8	Fred Tisue	FP		5 ft 8.5 in (1.74 m)	163 lb (74 kg)	(United States) Ames, Iowa	Oct 17, 1938	21 years, 314 days	USC	
9	Ron Volmer	FP		6 ft 0 in (1.83 m)	174 lb (79 kg)	(United States) Downey, California	Nov 22, 1935	24 years, 278 days	UC Berkeley	
10	Wally Wolf	FP		5 ft 10.5 in (1.79 m)	176 lb (80 kg)	(United States) Los Angeles, California	Oct 2, 1930	29 years, 329 days	USC	

- Note:
  - The 10 players above were all listed in page 615, 616, 619, 620 and 623 of the Official Report of the 1960 Olympic Games (page 624, 625, 628, 629 and 632 of the PDF document).
  - Jim Kelsey might be a reserve or alternate. He did not compete in this tournament. The official report of the International Olympic Committee did not count him as a competitor.

=== 1964 Summer Olympics ===
- Maximum number of entries and participants: 1 team of 7 players and 4 reserves per nation
- Number of participating nations: 13
- Host city: (Japan) Tokyo
- Final Ranking: 9th place
- Head coach: (United States) Urho Saari

No.	Player	Pos	H	Height	Weight	Birthplace	Birthdate	Age	College	Ref
1	Tony van Dorp	GK	R	6 ft 5 in (1.96 m)	201 lb (91 kg)	(Dutch East Indies) Batavia	Jun 25, 1936	28 years, 108 days		
2	Ron Crawford	D/CF	R	5 ft 10.5 in (1.79 m)	161 lb (73 kg)	(United States) Brea, California	Dec 6, 1939	24 years, 310 days	Long Beach State	
3	Dave Ashleigh	FP	R	6 ft 0 in (1.83 m)	170 lb (77 kg)	(United States) Pomona, California	Aug 8, 1943	21 years, 64 days	UCLA	
4	Ned McIlroy	FP	R	5 ft 10 in (1.78 m)	165 lb (75 kg)	(United States) Noonan, North Dakota	Jul 26, 1939	25 years, 77 days	USC	
5	Chick McIlroy	D/CF	R	5 ft 10.5 in (1.79 m)	163 lb (74 kg)	(United States) Minot, North Dakota	Aug 1, 1938	26 years, 71 days	Long Beach State	
6	Stan Cole	CF/D	R	6 ft 1 in (1.85 m)	190 lb (86 kg)	(United States) Dover, Delaware	Oct 12, 1945	18 years, 365 days	UCLA	
7	Bob Saari	FP	R	6 ft 2 in (1.88 m)	176 lb (80 kg)	(United States) Hawthorne, California	Jun 7, 1948	16 years, 126 days		
8	Dan Drown	FP	R	6 ft 2 in (1.88 m)	190 lb (86 kg)	(United States) Santa Ana, California	Oct 24, 1942	21 years, 353 days	UCLA, USC	
9	Paul McIlroy	FP	R	5 ft 10.5 in (1.79 m)	165 lb (75 kg)	(United States) (Unknown), North Dakota	May 12, 1937	27 years, 152 days		
10	Ralph Whitney	FP	R	5 ft 10.5 in (1.79 m)	165 lb (75 kg)	(United States) Fontana, California	Oct 30, 1936	27 years, 347 days	El Camino	
11	George Stransky	GK	R	6 ft 2 in (1.88 m)	170 lb (77 kg)	(United States) Stockbridge, Massachusetts	Jan 16, 1944	20 years, 269 days	Stanford	

- Note:
  - The 11 players above were all listed in page 676, 679 and 681 of the Official Report of the 1964 Olympic Games (page 685, 688 and 690 of the PDF document).

=== 1968 Summer Olympics ===
- Maximum number of entries and participants: 1 team of 7 players and 4 reserves per nation
- Number of participating nations: 15
- Host city: Mexico City
- Final Ranking: 5th place
- Head coach: (United States) Art Lambert
- Assistant coaches: (United States) Robert Horn (did not go), (Note: As one of the two assistant coaches of the United States men's national team, Robert Horn did not attend the 1968 Olympic Games. He had to stay home because he was the head coach of the UCLA Bruins back then.) (United States) Monte Nitzkowski

No.	Player	Pos	H	Height	Weight	Birthplace	Birthdate	Age	College	Ref
1	Tony van Dorp	GK	R	6 ft 5 in (1.96 m)	201 lb (91 kg)	(Dutch East Indies) Batavia	Jun 25, 1936	32 years, 111 days		
2	Dave Ashleigh (C)	FP	R	6 ft 0 in (1.83 m)	170 lb (77 kg)	(United States) Pomona, California	Aug 8, 1943	25 years, 67 days	UCLA	
3	Russ Webb	CB		6 ft 2 in (1.88 m)	194 lb (88 kg)	(United States) Los Angeles, California	Jun 1, 1945	23 years, 135 days	UCLA	
4	Ron Crawford	D/CF	R	5 ft 10.5 in (1.79 m)	161 lb (73 kg)	(United States) Brea, California	Dec 6, 1939	28 years, 313 days	Long Beach State	
5	Stan Cole	CF/D	R	6 ft 1 in (1.85 m)	190 lb (86 kg)	(United States) Dover, Delaware	Oct 12, 1945	23 years, 2 days	UCLA	
6	Bruce Bradley	FP		6 ft 2 in (1.88 m)	201 lb (91 kg)	(United States) Los Angeles, California	Jan 15, 1947	21 years, 273 days	UCLA	
7	Dean Willeford	FP		5 ft 10.5 in (1.79 m)	176 lb (80 kg)	(United States) Dallas, Texas	Oct 9, 1944	24 years, 5 days	USC	
8	Barry Weitzenberg	FP		6 ft 1 in (1.85 m)	194 lb (88 kg)	(United States) Palo Alto, California	Sep 30, 1946	22 years, 14 days	UC Berkeley	
9	Gary Sheerer	FP		5 ft 8.5 in (1.74 m)	161 lb (73 kg)	(United States) Berkeley, California	Feb 18, 1947	21 years, 239 days	Stanford	
10	John Parker	FP		6 ft 2 in (1.88 m)	190 lb (86 kg)	(United States) Newport, Rhode Island	Sep 13, 1946	22 years, 31 days	Stanford	
11	Steve Barnett	GK		6 ft 3 in (1.91 m)	190 lb (86 kg)	(United States) Los Angeles, California	Jun 6, 1943	25 years, 130 days	Long Beach State	

- Note:
  - The 11 players above were all listed in page 813, 815, 816, 818, 821, 822, 824 and 826 of the Official Report of the 1968 Olympic Games (page 812, 814, 815, 817, 820, 821, 823 and 825 of the PDF document).

=== 1972 Summer Olympics ===
- Maximum number of entries and participants: 1 team of 7 players and 4 reserves per nation
- Number of participating nations: 16
- Host city: (West Germany) Munich
- Final Ranking: 3rd place ( (bronze) Bronze medal)
- Head coach: (United States) Monte Nitzkowski
- Assistant coach:

No.	Player	Pos	H	Height	Weight	Birthplace	Birthdate	Age	College	Ref
1	Jim Slatton	GK		6 ft 2 in (1.88 m)	194 lb (88 kg)	(United States) Los Angeles, California	Jul 30, 1947	25 years, 28 days	UCLA	
2	Stan Cole	CF/D	R	6 ft 1 in (1.85 m)	190 lb (86 kg)	(United States) Dover, Delaware	Oct 12, 1945	26 years, 320 days	UCLA	
3	Russ Webb	CB		6 ft 2 in (1.88 m)	194 lb (88 kg)	(United States) Los Angeles, California	Jun 1, 1945	27 years, 87 days	UCLA	
4	Barry Weitzenberg	FP		6 ft 1 in (1.85 m)	194 lb (88 kg)	(United States) Palo Alto, California	Sep 30, 1946	25 years, 332 days	UC Berkeley	
5	Gary Sheerer (C)	FP		5 ft 8.5 in (1.74 m)	161 lb (73 kg)	(United States) Berkeley, California	Feb 18, 1947	25 years, 191 days	Stanford	
6	Bruce Bradley	FP		6 ft 2 in (1.88 m)	201 lb (91 kg)	(United States) Los Angeles, California	Jan 15, 1947	25 years, 225 days	UCLA	
7	Peter Asch	FP		6 ft 2 in (1.88 m)	181 lb (82 kg)	(United States) Monterey, California	Oct 16, 1948	23 years, 316 days	UC Berkeley	
8	Jim Ferguson	D		6 ft 2 in (1.88 m)	185 lb (84 kg)	(United States) Kokomo, Indiana	Apr 27, 1949	23 years, 122 days	UCLA	
9	Steve Barnett	GK		6 ft 3 in (1.91 m)	190 lb (86 kg)	(United States) Los Angeles, California	Jun 6, 1943	29 years, 82 days	Long Beach State	
10	John Parker	FP		6 ft 2 in (1.88 m)	190 lb (86 kg)	(United States) Newport, Rhode Island	Sep 13, 1946	25 years, 349 days	Stanford	
11	Eric Lindroth	CF	L	6 ft 2 in (1.88 m)	190 lb (86 kg)	(United States) Huntington Beach, California	Sep 12, 1951	20 years, 350 days	UCLA	

- Note:
  - The 11 players above were all listed in page 353, 354, 355, 363, 364 and 365 of the Official Report of the 1972 Olympic Games (page 353, 354, 355, 363, 364 and 365 of the PDF document).

=== 1976 Summer Olympics ===
- Maximum number of entries and participants: 1 team of 7 players and 4 reserves per nation
- Number of participating nations: 12
- Host city: (Canada) Montreal
- Final Ranking: Did not qualify

=== 1980 Summer Olympics ===
- Maximum number of entries and participants: 1 team of 7 players and 4 reserves per nation
- Number of participating nations: 12
- Host city: (Soviet Union) Moscow
- Final Ranking: Qualified but withdrew
- Head coach: (United States) Monte Nitzkowski

#	Player	Pos	H	Height	Weight	Birthplace	Birthdate	Age	College	Ref
1	Chris Dorst	GK		6 ft 3.5 in (1.92 m)	190 lb (86 kg)		Jun 5, 1956	24 years, 45 days	Stanford	
2	Gary Figueroa	D		6 ft 0 in (1.83 m)	170 lb (77 kg)	(United States) Phoenix, Arizona	Sep 28, 1956	23 years, 296 days	UC Irvine	
3	Steve Hamann	GK							San Jose State	
4	Eric Lindroth	CF	L	6 ft 2 in (1.88 m)	190 lb (86 kg)	(United States) Huntington Beach, California	Sep 12, 1951	28 years, 312 days	UCLA	
5	Drew McDonald	CB		6 ft 4.5 in (1.94 m)	201 lb (91 kg)	(Canada) Vancouver, British Columbia	Oct 19, 1955	24 years, 275 days	Stanford	
6	Kevin Robertson	D	L	5 ft 8.5 in (1.74 m)	165 lb (75 kg)	(United States) Biloxi, Mississippi	Feb 2, 1959	21 years, 169 days	UC Berkeley	
7	Peter Schnugg	D							UC Berkeley	
8	Terry Schroeder	CF		6 ft 2.5 in (1.89 m)	209 lb (95 kg)	(United States) Santa Barbara, California	Oct 9, 1958	21 years, 285 days	Pepperdine	
9	John Siman	CB		6 ft 5.5 in (1.97 m)	201 lb (91 kg)	(United States) Long Beach, California	Oct 7, 1952	27 years, 287 days	Cal State Fullerton	
10	Jon Svendsen	CB		6 ft 2.5 in (1.89 m)	205 lb (93 kg)	(United States) Berkeley, California	Oct 26, 1953	26 years, 268 days	UC Berkeley	
11	Joe Vargas	D		6 ft 2.5 in (1.89 m)	196 lb (89 kg)	(United States) Los Angeles, California	Oct 4, 1955	24 years, 290 days	UCLA	

- Note:
  - The 11 players above were all listed on the webpage of the USA Water Polo.

=== 1984 Summer Olympics ===
- Maximum number of entries and participants: 1 team of 7 players and 6 reserves per nation
- Number of participating nations: 12
- Host city: (United States) Los Angeles
- Final Ranking: 2nd place ( (silver) Silver medal)
- Head coach: (United States) Monte Nitzkowski
- Assistant coach: (United States) Ken Lindgren

No.	Player	Pos	H	Height	Weight	Birthplace	Birthdate	Age	College	Ref
1	Craig Wilson	GK		6 ft 4.5 in (1.94 m)	190 lb (86 kg)	(United States) Beeville, Texas	Feb 5, 1957	27 years, 178 days	UC Santa Barbara	
2	Kevin Robertson	D	L	5 ft 8.5 in (1.74 m)	165 lb (75 kg)	(United States) Biloxi, Mississippi	Feb 2, 1959	25 years, 181 days	UC Berkeley	
3	Gary Figueroa	D		6 ft 0 in (1.83 m)	170 lb (77 kg)	(United States) Phoenix, Arizona	Sep 28, 1956	27 years, 308 days	UC Irvine	
4	Peter Campbell	CF		6 ft 3.5 in (1.92 m)	196 lb (89 kg)	(United States) Salt Lake City, Utah	May 21, 1960	24 years, 72 days	UC Irvine	
5	Doug Burke	D		6 ft 0 in (1.83 m)	181 lb (82 kg)	(United States) Modesto, California	Mar 30, 1957	27 years, 124 days	Stanford	
6	Joe Vargas	D		6 ft 2.5 in (1.89 m)	196 lb (89 kg)	(United States) Los Angeles, California	Oct 4, 1955	28 years, 302 days	UCLA	
7	Jon Svendsen	CB		6 ft 2.5 in (1.89 m)	205 lb (93 kg)	(United States) Berkeley, California	Oct 26, 1953	30 years, 280 days	UC Berkeley	
8	John Siman	CB		6 ft 5.5 in (1.97 m)	201 lb (91 kg)	(United States) Long Beach, California	Oct 7, 1952	31 years, 299 days	Cal State Fullerton	
9	Drew McDonald	CB		6 ft 4.5 in (1.94 m)	201 lb (91 kg)	(Canada) Vancouver, British Columbia	Oct 19, 1955	28 years, 287 days	Stanford	
10	Terry Schroeder (C)	CF		6 ft 2.5 in (1.89 m)	209 lb (95 kg)	(United States) Santa Barbara, California	Oct 9, 1958	25 years, 297 days	Pepperdine	
11	Jody Campbell	CF		6 ft 2.5 in (1.89 m)	196 lb (89 kg)	(United States) Bellflower, California	Mar 4, 1960	24 years, 150 days	Stanford	
12	Tim Shaw	D		6 ft 2 in (1.88 m)	196 lb (89 kg)	(United States) Long Beach, California	Nov 8, 1957	26 years, 267 days	Long Beach State, Univ. of Arizona	
13	Chris Dorst	GK		6 ft 3.5 in (1.92 m)	190 lb (86 kg)		Jun 5, 1956	28 years, 57 days	Stanford	

- Note:
  - The 13 players above were all listed in page 577, 579, 580 and 582 of the Official Report of the 1984 Olympic Games (page 528, 530, 531 and 533 of the PDF document).

=== 1988 Summer Olympics ===
- Maximum number of entries and participants: 1 team of 7 players and 6 reserves per nation
- Number of participating nations: 12
- Host city: (South Korea) Seoul
- Final Ranking: 2nd place ( (silver) Silver medal)
- Head coach: (United States) Bill Barnett
- Assistant coaches: (United States) Dave Almquist, (United States) Steve Heaston

No.	Player	Pos	H	Height	Weight	Birthplace	Birthdate	Age	College	Ref
1	Craig Wilson	GK		6 ft 4.5 in (1.94 m)	190 lb (86 kg)	(United States) Beeville, Texas	Feb 5, 1957	31 years, 229 days	UC Santa Barbara	
2	Kevin Robertson	D	L	5 ft 8.5 in (1.74 m)	165 lb (75 kg)	(United States) Biloxi, Mississippi	Feb 2, 1959	29 years, 232 days	UC Berkeley	
3	James Bergeson	D		6 ft 0 in (1.83 m)	190 lb (86 kg)	(United States) Newport Beach, California	Mar 21, 1961	27 years, 184 days	Stanford	
4	Peter Campbell	CF/U		6 ft 3.5 in (1.92 m)	196 lb (89 kg)	(United States) Salt Lake City, Utah	May 21, 1960	28 years, 123 days	UC Irvine	
5	Doug Kimbell	CB		6 ft 8.5 in (2.04 m)	229 lb (104 kg)	(United States) Long Beach, California	Jun 22, 1960	28 years, 91 days	Long Beach State	
6	Craig Klass	CF	L	6 ft 4.5 in (1.94 m)	216 lb (98 kg)	(West Germany) Wiesbaden, Hesse	Jun 20, 1965	23 years, 93 days	Stanford	
7	Alan Mouchawar	U		6 ft 0.5 in (1.84 m)	194 lb (88 kg)	(United States) Los Angeles, California	Aug 3, 1960	28 years, 49 days	Stanford	
8	Jeff Campbell	CB		6 ft 3.5 in (1.92 m)	207 lb (94 kg)	(United States) Salt Lake City, Utah	Oct 2, 1962	25 years, 355 days	UC Irvine	
9	Greg Boyer	CF		6 ft 2.5 in (1.89 m)	209 lb (95 kg)	(United States) New York, New York	Feb 5, 1958	30 years, 229 days	UC Santa Barbara	
10	Terry Schroeder (C)	CF		6 ft 2.5 in (1.89 m)	209 lb (95 kg)	(United States) Santa Barbara, California	Oct 9, 1958	29 years, 348 days	Pepperdine	
11	Jody Campbell	CF		6 ft 2.5 in (1.89 m)	196 lb (89 kg)	(United States) Bellflower, California	Mar 4, 1960	28 years, 201 days	Stanford	
12	Chris Duplanty	GK		6 ft 2.5 in (1.89 m)	209 lb (95 kg)	(United States) Palo Alto, California	Oct 21, 1965	22 years, 336 days	UC Irvine	
13	Mike Evans	D		6 ft 2 in (1.88 m)	205 lb (93 kg)	(United States) Fontana, California	Mar 26, 1960	28 years, 179 days	UC Irvine	

- Note:
  - The 13 players above were all listed in page 598, 599, 600, 602 of the Official Report of the 1988 Olympic Games (page 593, 594, 595, 597 of the PDF document).

=== 1992 Summer Olympics ===
- Maximum number of entries and participants: 1 team of 7 players and 6 reserves per nation
- Number of participating nations: 12
- Host city: (Spain) Barcelona
- Final Ranking: 4th place
- Head coach: (United States) Bill Barnett
- Assistant coaches: (United States) Guy Baker, (United States) John Tanner

No.	Player	Pos	H	Height	Weight	Birthplace	Birthdate	Age	College	Ref
1	Craig Wilson	GK		6 ft 4.5 in (1.94 m)	190 lb (86 kg)	(United States) Beeville, Texas	Feb 5, 1957	35 years, 178 days	UC Santa Barbara	
2	John Vargas	D		5 ft 10 in (1.78 m)	154 lb (70 kg)	(United States) Fullerton, California	Jun 17, 1961	31 years, 45 days	UC Irvine	
3	Chris Duplanty	GK		6 ft 2.5 in (1.89 m)	209 lb (95 kg)	(United States) Palo Alto, California	Oct 21, 1965	26 years, 285 days	UC Irvine	
4	Mike Evans	D		6 ft 2 in (1.88 m)	205 lb (93 kg)	(United States) Fontana, California	Mar 26, 1960	32 years, 128 days	UC Irvine	
5	Doug Kimbell	CB		6 ft 8.5 in (2.04 m)	229 lb (104 kg)	(United States) Long Beach, California	Jun 22, 1960	32 years, 40 days	Long Beach State	
6	Charlie Harris	CF		6 ft 4.5 in (1.94 m)	205 lb (93 kg)	(United States) Palm Springs, California	Nov 9, 1963	28 years, 266 days	USC	
7	Kirk Everist	D		6 ft 2.5 in (1.89 m)	201 lb (91 kg)	(United States) Houston, Texas	Apr 12, 1967	25 years, 111 days	UC Berkeley	
8	Jeff Campbell	CB		6 ft 3.5 in (1.92 m)	207 lb (94 kg)	(United States) Salt Lake City, Utah	Oct 2, 1962	29 years, 304 days	UC Irvine	
9	Chris Humbert	CF	L	6 ft 6.5 in (1.99 m)	225 lb (102 kg)	(United States) Modesto, California	Dec 27, 1969	22 years, 218 days	UC Berkeley	
10	Terry Schroeder (C)	CF		6 ft 2.5 in (1.89 m)	209 lb (95 kg)	(United States) Santa Barbara, California	Oct 9, 1958	33 years, 297 days	Pepperdine	
11	Craig Klass	CF	L	6 ft 4.5 in (1.94 m)	216 lb (98 kg)	(West Germany) Wiesbaden, Hesse	Jun 20, 1965	27 years, 42 days	Stanford	
12	Erich Fischer	CB/U		6 ft 2.5 in (1.89 m)	190 lb (86 kg)	(United States) Dinuba, California	Mar 12, 1966	26 years, 142 days	Stanford	
13	Alex Rousseau	CF	L	6 ft 4.5 in (1.94 m)	201 lb (91 kg)	(France) Paris	Nov 4, 1967	24 years, 271 days	UCLA	

- Note:
  - The 13 players above were all listed in page 386, 387, 388, 389, 390, 399 and 400 of the Official Report of the 1992 Olympic Games (page 386, 387, 388, 389, 390, 399 and 400 of the PDF document).

=== 1996 Summer Olympics ===
- Maximum number of entries and participants: 1 team of 7 players and 6 reserves per nation
- Number of participating nations: 12
- Host city: (United States) Atlanta
- Final Ranking: 7th place
- Head coach: (United States) Richard Corso
- Assistant coaches: (Brazil) Ricardo Azevedo, (United States) John Vargas

No.	Player	Pos	H	Height	Weight	Birthplace	Birthdate	Age	College	Ref
1	Chris Duplanty (C)	GK		6 ft 2.5 in (1.89 m)	209 lb (95 kg)	(United States) Palo Alto, California	Oct 21, 1965	30 years, 273 days	UC Irvine	
2	Dan Hackett	GK		6 ft 5.5 in (1.97 m)	196 lb (89 kg)	(United States) Syracuse, New York	Sep 11, 1970	25 years, 313 days	UCLA	
3	Jeremy Laster	D	L	6 ft 4.5 in (1.94 m)	201 lb (91 kg)	(United States) Fullerton, California	Feb 24, 1974	22 years, 147 days	Stanford	
4	Kyle Kopp	CF		6 ft 6.5 in (1.99 m)	229 lb (104 kg)	(United States) San Bernardino, California	Nov 10, 1966	29 years, 253 days	Long Beach State	
5	Chris Oeding	D		6 ft 0.5 in (1.84 m)	183 lb (83 kg)	(United States) Santa Ana, California	Sep 10, 1971	24 years, 314 days	UC Berkeley	
6	Gavin Arroyo	CB		6 ft 2.5 in (1.89 m)	190 lb (86 kg)	(United States) Orange, California	May 10, 1972	24 years, 71 days	UC Berkeley	
7	Alex Rousseau	CF	L	6 ft 4.5 in (1.94 m)	201 lb (91 kg)	(France) Paris	Nov 4, 1967	28 years, 259 days	UCLA	
8	Rick McNair	CB		6 ft 4.5 in (1.94 m)	201 lb (91 kg)	(United States) Berkeley, California	Sep 10, 1971	24 years, 314 days	Stanford	
9	Kirk Everist	D		6 ft 2.5 in (1.89 m)	201 lb (91 kg)	(United States) Houston, Texas	Apr 12, 1967	29 years, 99 days	UC Berkeley	
10	Chris Humbert	CF	L	6 ft 6.5 in (1.99 m)	225 lb (102 kg)	(United States) Modesto, California	Dec 27, 1969	26 years, 206 days	UC Berkeley	
11	Mike Evans	D		6 ft 2 in (1.88 m)	205 lb (93 kg)	(United States) Fontana, California	Mar 26, 1960	36 years, 116 days	UC Irvine	
12	Troy Barnhart, Jr.	CF		6 ft 3.5 in (1.92 m)	216 lb (98 kg)	(United States) Hanford, California	May 22, 1971	25 years, 59 days	UC Berkeley	
13	Wolf Wigo	D		6 ft 1.5 in (1.87 m)	190 lb (86 kg)	(United States) Abington, Pennsylvania	May 8, 1973	23 years, 73 days	Stanford	

- Note:
  - The 13 players above were all listed in page 47, 48, 49, 50, 51, 55, 56 and 57 of the Official Report of the 1996 Olympic Games (page 62, 63, 64, 65, 66, 70, 71 and 72 of the PDF document).

=== 2000 Summer Olympics ===
- Maximum number of entries and participants: 1 team of 7 players and 6 reserves per nation
- Number of participating nations: 12
- Host city: (Australia) Sydney
- Final Ranking: 6th place
- Head coach: (United States) John Vargas
- Assistant coaches: (United States) Richard Corso, (United States) John Tanner

No.	Player	Pos	H	Height	Weight	Birthplace	Birthdate	Age	College	Ref
1	Dan Hackett	GK		6 ft 5.5 in (1.97 m)	196 lb (89 kg)	(United States) Syracuse, New York	Sep 11, 1970	30 years, 12 days	UCLA	
2	Chi Kredell	CB		6 ft 1.5 in (1.87 m)	194 lb (88 kg)	(United States) Long Beach, California	Feb 16, 1971	29 years, 220 days	Long Beach State	
3	Robert Lynn	CB/U		6 ft 1.5 in (1.87 m)	198 lb (90 kg)	(United States) Long Beach, California	Feb 7, 1967	33 years, 229 days	USC	
4	Kyle Kopp	CF		6 ft 6.5 in (1.99 m)	229 lb (104 kg)	(United States) San Bernardino, California	Nov 10, 1966	33 years, 318 days	Long Beach State	
5	Chris Oeding (C)	D		6 ft 0.5 in (1.84 m)	183 lb (83 kg)	(United States) Santa Ana, California	Sep 10, 1971	29 years, 13 days	UC Berkeley	
6	Gavin Arroyo	CB		6 ft 2.5 in (1.89 m)	190 lb (86 kg)	(United States) Orange, California	May 10, 1972	28 years, 136 days	UC Berkeley	
7	Brad Schumacher	D		6 ft 3.5 in (1.92 m)	198 lb (90 kg)	(United States) Bowie, Maryland	Mar 6, 1974	26 years, 201 days	Pacific	
8	Tony Azevedo	D	R	6 ft 1 in (1.85 m)	192 lb (87 kg)	(Brazil) Rio de Janeiro, Rio de Janeiro	Nov 21, 1981	18 years, 307 days	Stanford	
9	Wolf Wigo	D		6 ft 1.5 in (1.87 m)	190 lb (86 kg)	(United States) Abington, Pennsylvania	May 8, 1973	27 years, 138 days	Stanford	
10	Chris Humbert	CF	L	6 ft 6.5 in (1.99 m)	225 lb (102 kg)	(United States) Modesto, California	Dec 27, 1969	30 years, 271 days	UC Berkeley	
11	Sean Kern	CF/CB		6 ft 4.5 in (1.94 m)	220 lb (100 kg)	(United States) Honolulu, Hawaii	Jul 11, 1978	22 years, 74 days	UCLA	
12	Sean Nolan	GK		6 ft 5.5 in (1.97 m)	203 lb (92 kg)	(United States) Palo Alto, California	Jul 18, 1972	28 years, 67 days	UC Berkeley	
13	Ryan Bailey	CF	R	6 ft 5.5 in (1.97 m)	249 lb (113 kg)	(United States) Long Beach, California	Aug 28, 1975	25 years, 26 days	UC Irvine	

- Note:
  - The 13 players above were all listed in page 42, 47, 51, 53, 80, 82, 89 and 90 of the Official Results Book of the 2000 Olympic Games (PDF document).

#	Player	Pos	H	Height	Weight	Birthplace	Birthdate	Age	College	Ref
Alternate	Jeremy Pope	CB		6 ft 5 in (1.96 m)					Pepperdine	

=== 2004 Summer Olympics ===
- Maximum number of entries and participants: 1 team of 7 players and 6 reserves per nation
- Number of participating nations: 12
- Host city: (Greece) Athens
- Final Ranking: 7th place
- Head coach: (Italy) Ratko Rudić
- Assistant coaches: (Brazil) Ricardo Azevedo, (United States) Dan Leyson

No.	Player	Pos	H	Height	Weight	Birthplace	Birthdate	Age	College	Ref
1	Brandon Brooks	GK	R	6 ft 5.5 in (1.97 m)	234 lb (106 kg)	(United States) Honolulu, Hawaii	Apr 29, 1981	23 years, 108 days	UCLA	
2	Wolf Wigo (C)	D		6 ft 1.5 in (1.87 m)	190 lb (86 kg)	(United States) Abington, Pennsylvania	May 8, 1973	31 years, 99 days	Stanford	
3	Omar Amr	D		5 ft 10.5 in (1.79 m)	203 lb (92 kg)	(United States) Bellflower, California	Sep 20, 1974	29 years, 330 days	UC Irvine	
4	Jeff Powers	CF	R	6 ft 7 in (2.01 m)	229 lb (104 kg)	(United States) Chattanooga, Tennessee	Jan 21, 1980	24 years, 207 days	UC Irvine	
5	Adam Wright	D	R	6 ft 3 in (1.91 m)	198 lb (90 kg)	(United States) Huntington Beach, California	May 4, 1977	27 years, 103 days	UCLA	
6	Chris Segesman	CB		6 ft 3.5 in (1.92 m)	203 lb (92 kg)	(United States) Santa Barbara, California	Jun 17, 1979	25 years, 59 days	Long Beach State	
7	Layne Beaubien	CB	R	6 ft 5.5 in (1.97 m)	218 lb (99 kg)	(United States) Coronado, California	Jul 4, 1976	28 years, 42 days	Stanford	
8	Tony Azevedo	D	R	6 ft 1 in (1.85 m)	192 lb (87 kg)	(Brazil) Rio de Janeiro, Rio de Janeiro	Nov 21, 1981	22 years, 268 days	Stanford	
9	Dan Klatt	CB		6 ft 4.5 in (1.94 m)	203 lb (92 kg)	(United States) Dallas, Texas	Oct 28, 1978	25 years, 292 days	UC Irvine	
10	Brett Ormsby	D		6 ft 2.5 in (1.89 m)	183 lb (83 kg)	(United States) San Diego, California	Dec 1, 1982	21 years, 258 days	UCLA	
11	Jesse Smith	U	R	6 ft 4 in (1.93 m)	238 lb (108 kg)	(United States) Kailua, Hawaii	Apr 27, 1983	21 years, 110 days	Pepperdine	
12	Genai Kerr	GK		6 ft 7.5 in (2.02 m)	209 lb (95 kg)	(United States) Los Angeles, California	Dec 25, 1976	27 years, 234 days	UC Irvine	
13	Ryan Bailey	CF	R	6 ft 5.5 in (1.97 m)	249 lb (113 kg)	(United States) Long Beach, California	Aug 28, 1975	28 years, 353 days	UC Irvine	

- Note:
  - The 13 players above were all listed in page 95, 97, 105, 112, 118, 159, 167, 229, 230, 231 and 232 of the Official Results Book of the 2004 Olympic Games (PDF document).

#	Player	Pos	H	Height	Weight	Birthplace	Birthdate	Age	College	Ref
Alternate	Peter Hudnut	CB/CF	R	6 ft 5 in (1.96 m)	225 lb (102 kg)	(United States) Washington, D.C.	Feb 16, 1980	24 years, 181 days	Stanford	

=== 2008 Summer Olympics ===
- Maximum number of entries and participants: 1 team of 7 players and 6 reserves per nation
- Number of participating nations: 12
- Host city: (China) Beijing
- Final Ranking: 2nd place ( (silver) Silver medal)
- Head coach: (United States) Terry Schroeder
- Assistant coaches: (United States) Ryan Brown, (United States) Robert Lynn

No.	Player	Pos	H	Height	Weight	Birthplace	Birthdate	Age	College	Ref
1	Merrill Moses	GK	R	6 ft 3 in (1.91 m)	216 lb (98 kg)	(United States) Harbor City, California	Aug 13, 1977	30 years, 363 days	Pepperdine	
2	Peter Varellas	D	L	6 ft 3 in (1.91 m)	190 lb (86 kg)	(United States) Moraga, California	Oct 2, 1984	23 years, 313 days	Stanford	
3	Peter Hudnut	CB	R	6 ft 5 in (1.96 m)	225 lb (102 kg)	(United States) Washington, D.C.	Feb 16, 1980	28 years, 176 days	Stanford	
4	Jeff Powers	U	R	6 ft 7 in (2.01 m)	238 lb (108 kg)	(United States) Chattanooga, Tennessee	Jan 21, 1980	28 years, 202 days	UC Irvine	
5	Adam Wright	D	R	6 ft 3 in (1.91 m)	194 lb (88 kg)	(United States) Huntington Beach, California	May 4, 1977	31 years, 98 days	UCLA	
6	Rick Merlo	U	R	6 ft 3 in (1.91 m)	216 lb (98 kg)	(United States) Fresno, California	Aug 5, 1982	26 years, 5 days	UC Irvine	
7	Layne Beaubien	U	R	6 ft 5.5 in (1.97 m)	220 lb (100 kg)	(United States) Coronado, California	Jul 4, 1976	32 years, 37 days	Stanford	
8	Tony Azevedo (C)	D	R	6 ft 1 in (1.85 m)	201 lb (91 kg)	(Brazil) Rio de Janeiro, Rio de Janeiro	Nov 21, 1981	26 years, 263 days	Stanford	
9	Ryan Bailey	CF	R	6 ft 5.5 in (1.97 m)	245 lb (111 kg)	(United States) Long Beach, California	Aug 28, 1975	32 years, 348 days	UC Irvine	
10	Tim Hutten	CB	R	6 ft 5 in (1.96 m)	220 lb (100 kg)	(United States) Los Alamitos, California	Jun 4, 1985	23 years, 67 days	UC Irvine	
11	Jesse Smith	CB	R	6 ft 4 in (1.93 m)	231 lb (105 kg)	(United States) Kailua, Hawaii	Apr 27, 1983	25 years, 105 days	Pepperdine	
12	J. W. Krumpholz	CF	R	6 ft 3 in (1.91 m)	205 lb (93 kg)	(United States) Orange County, California	Sep 22, 1987	20 years, 323 days	USC	
13	Brandon Brooks	GK	R	6 ft 5.5 in (1.97 m)	245 lb (111 kg)	(United States) Honolulu, Hawaii	Apr 29, 1981	27 years, 103 days	UCLA	

- Note:
  - The 13 players above were all listed in page 79, 116, 118, 126, 132, 138, 158, 168, 213, 214 and 215 of the Official Results Book of the 2008 Olympic Games (PDF document).

#	Player	Pos	H	Height	Weight	Birthplace	Birthdate	Age	College	Ref
Alternate 1	Brian Alexander	D	R	6 ft 3 in (1.91 m)	220 lb (100 kg)	(United States) Santa Ana, California	May 3, 1983	25 years, 99 days	UC Santa Barbara	
Alternate 2	John Mann	CF	R	6 ft 6 in (1.98 m)	240 lb (110 kg)	(United States) Beverly Hills, California	Jun 27, 1985	23 years, 44 days	UC Berkeley	

=== 2012 Summer Olympics ===
- Maximum number of entries and participants: 1 team of 7 players and 6 reserves per nation
- Number of participating nations: 12
- Host city: (United Kingdom) London
- Final Ranking: 8th place
- Head coach: (United States) Terry Schroeder
- Assistant coaches: (United States) Robert Lynn, (Italy) Marco Palazzo

No.	Player	Pos	H	Height	Weight	Birthplace	Birthdate	Age	College	Ref
1	Merrill Moses	GK	R	6 ft 3 in (1.91 m)	214 lb (97 kg)	(United States) Harbor City, California	Aug 13, 1977	34 years, 351 days	Pepperdine	
2	Peter Varellas	D	L	6 ft 3 in (1.91 m)	192 lb (87 kg)	(United States) Moraga, California	Oct 2, 1984	27 years, 301 days	Stanford	
3	Peter Hudnut	CB	R	6 ft 5 in (1.96 m)	231 lb (105 kg)	(United States) Washington, D.C.	Feb 16, 1980	32 years, 164 days	Stanford	
4	Jeff Powers	CB	R	6 ft 7 in (2.01 m)	238 lb (108 kg)	(United States) Chattanooga, Tennessee	Jan 21, 1980	32 years, 190 days	UC Irvine	
5	Adam Wright	D	R	6 ft 3 in (1.91 m)	196 lb (89 kg)	(United States) Huntington Beach, California	May 4, 1977	35 years, 86 days	UCLA	
6	Shea Buckner	D	R	6 ft 5 in (1.96 m)	220 lb (100 kg)	(United States) Huntington Beach, California	Dec 12, 1986	25 years, 230 days	USC	
7	Layne Beaubien	U	R	6 ft 5.5 in (1.97 m)	220 lb (100 kg)	(United States) Coronado, California	Jul 4, 1976	36 years, 25 days	Stanford	
8	Tony Azevedo (C)	D	R	6 ft 1 in (1.85 m)	196 lb (89 kg)	(Brazil) Rio de Janeiro, Rio de Janeiro	Nov 21, 1981	30 years, 251 days	Stanford	
9	Ryan Bailey	CF	R	6 ft 5.5 in (1.97 m)	245 lb (111 kg)	(United States) Long Beach, California	Aug 28, 1975	36 years, 336 days	UC Irvine	
10	Tim Hutten	CB	R	6 ft 5 in (1.96 m)	216 lb (98 kg)	(United States) Los Alamitos, California	Jun 4, 1985	27 years, 55 days	UC Irvine	
11	Jesse Smith	CB	R	6 ft 4 in (1.93 m)	240 lb (110 kg)	(United States) Kailua, Hawaii	Apr 27, 1983	29 years, 93 days	Pepperdine	
12	John Mann	CF	R	6 ft 6 in (1.98 m)	249 lb (113 kg)	(United States) Beverly Hills, California	Jun 27, 1985	27 years, 32 days	UC Berkeley	
13	Chay Lapin	GK	R	6 ft 5.5 in (1.97 m)	209 lb (95 kg)	(United States) Fountain Valley, California	Feb 25, 1987	25 years, 155 days	UCLA	

- Note:
  - The 13 players above were all listed on the webpage of the USA Water Polo and in page 26 and 27 of 2012 USA Water Polo Olympic Media Guide (PDF document).

=== 2016 Summer Olympics ===
- Maximum number of entries and participants: 1 team of 7 players and 6 reserves per nation
- Number of participating nations: 12
- Host city: (Brazil) Rio de Janeiro
- Final Ranking: 10th place
- Head coach: (Serbia) Dejan Udovičić
- Assistant coaches: (United States) Jack Kocur, (United States) Alex Rodriguez

No.	Player	Pos	H	Height	Weight	Birthplace	Birthdate	Age	College	Ref
1	Merrill Moses	GK	R	6 ft 3 in (1.91 m)	205 lb (93 kg)	(United States) Harbor City, California	Aug 13, 1977	38 years, 359 days	Pepperdine	
2	Thomas Dunstan	D	L	6 ft 4 in (1.93 m)	201 lb (91 kg)	(United States) Norwalk, Connecticut	Sep 29, 1997	18 years, 312 days	High school (Committed to USC)	
3	Ben Hallock	CF	R	6 ft 6 in (1.98 m)	245 lb (111 kg)	(United States) Santa Barbara, California	Nov 22, 1997	18 years, 258 days	High school (Committed to Stanford)	
4	Alex Obert	CF/CB	R	6 ft 6 in (1.98 m)	225 lb (102 kg)	(United States) Yorba Linda, California	Dec 18, 1991	24 years, 232 days	Pacific	
5	Alex Roelse	CB	R	6 ft 7 in (2.01 m)	231 lb (105 kg)	(Netherlands) Gorinchem, South Holland	Jan 10, 1995	21 years, 209 days	UCLA	
6	Luca Cupido	D	R	6 ft 4 in (1.93 m)	209 lb (95 kg)	(Italy) Genoa, Liguria	Nov 9, 1995	20 years, 271 days	UC Berkeley	
7	Josh Samuels	D	R	6 ft 4 in (1.93 m)	205 lb (93 kg)	(United States) Newport Beach, California	Jul 8, 1991	25 years, 29 days	UCLA	
8	Tony Azevedo (C)	D	R	6 ft 1 in (1.85 m)	198 lb (90 kg)	(Brazil) Rio de Janeiro, Rio de Janeiro	Nov 21, 1981	34 years, 259 days	Stanford	
9	Alex Bowen	D	R	6 ft 5 in (1.96 m)	220 lb (100 kg)	(United States) San Diego, California	Sep 4, 1993	22 years, 337 days	Stanford	
10	Bret Bonanni	D	R	6 ft 4 in (1.93 m)	205 lb (93 kg)	(United States) Newport Beach, California	Jan 20, 1994	22 years, 199 days	Stanford	
11	Jesse Smith	U	R	6 ft 4 in (1.93 m)	240 lb (110 kg)	(United States) Kailua, Hawaii	Apr 27, 1983	33 years, 101 days	Pepperdine	
12	John Mann	CF	R	6 ft 6 in (1.98 m)	249 lb (113 kg)	(United States) Beverly Hills, California	Jun 27, 1985	31 years, 40 days	UC Berkeley	
13	McQuin Baron	GK	R	6 ft 8 in (2.03 m)	229 lb (104 kg)	(United States) Laguna Beach, California	Oct 27, 1995	20 years, 284 days	USC	

- Note:
  - The 13 players above were all listed on the webpage of the USA Water Polo and in page 24 and 25 of 2016 USA Water Polo Media Guide (PDF document).

== Statistics ==
=== Number of competitors and average age, height & weight ===
The following table shows number of competitors and average age, height & weight at the Olympic Games by tournament.

Games	Competitors	Returning Olympians		Average			Finish	Ref
Games	Number	Number	%	Age	Height	Weight	Finish	Ref
(Belgium) 1920 Antwerp	11	0	0.00%	26 years, 77 days			4th of 12	
(France) 1924 Paris	11	1	9.09%	25 years, 72 days (Note: Average age of 10 competitors.)			3rd of 13	
(Netherlands) 1928 Amsterdam	11	4	36.36%	25 years, 364 days (Note: Average age of 9 competitors.)			7th of 14	
(United States) 1932 Los Angeles	7 (Note: Only 7 players competed in this tournament. They were all listed in page 607, 629, 630, 631, 632 and 633 of the Official Report of the 1932 Olympic Games (page 623, 646, 647, 648, 649 and 650 of the PDF document). The official report of the International Olympic Committee did not count other reserves or alternates as competitors or medalists.)	1	14.29%	26 years, 220 days			3rd of 5	
(Germany) 1936 Berlin	9 (Note: Only 9 players competed in this tournament. They were all listed in page 984 of the Official Report of the 1936 Olympic Games (page 345 of the PDF document). The official report of the International Olympic Committee did not count other reserves or alternates as competitors.)	6	66.67%	29 years, 183 days			9th of 16	
(United Kingdom) 1948 London	8 (Note: Only 8 players competed in this tournament. They were all listed in page 470 and 472 of the Official Report of the 1948 Olympic Games (page 642 and 644 of the PDF document). The official report of the International Olympic Committee did not count other reserves or alternates as competitors.)	2	25.00%	31 years, 185 days			11th of 18	
(Finland) 1952 Helsinki	10 (Note: Only 10 players competed in this tournament. They were all listed in page 599, 600, 603, 604 and 605 of the Official Report of the 1952 Olympic Games (page 602, 603, 606, 607 and 608 of the PDF document). The official report of the International Olympic Committee did not count other reserves or alternates as competitors.)	0	0.00%	22 years, 77 days			4th of 21	
(Australia) 1956 Melbourne	10 (Note: Only 10 players competed in this tournament. They were all listed in page 623 and 624 of the Official Report of the 1956 Olympic Games (page 625 and 626 of the PDF document). The official report of the International Olympic Committee did not count other reserves or alternates as competitors.)	2	20.00%	25 years, 230 days	6 ft 1 in (1.85 m)	182 lb (83 kg)	5th of 10	
(Italy) 1960 Rome	10 (Note: Only 10 players competed in this tournament. They were all listed in page 615, 616, 619, 620 and 623 of the Official Report of the 1960 Olympic Games (page 624, 625, 628, 629 and 632 of the PDF document). The official report of the International Olympic Committee did not count other reserves or alternates as competitors.)	4	40.00%	24 years, 361 days	5 ft 11.5 in (1.82 m)	176 lb (80 kg)	7th of 16	
(Japan) 1964 Tokyo	11	2	18.18%	23 years, 204 days	6 ft 0 in (1.83 m)	174 lb (79 kg)	9th of 13	
1968 Mexico City	11	4	36.36%	24 years, 187 days	6 ft 0.5 in (1.84 m)	184 lb (83 kg)	5th of 15	
(West Germany) 1972 Munich	11	7	63.64%	25 years, 152 days	6 ft 1 in (1.85 m)	188 lb (85 kg)	3rd of 16	
(United States) 1984 Los Angeles	13	0	0.00%	27 years, 188 days	6 ft 2 in (1.88 m)	192 lb (87 kg)	2nd of 12	
(South Korea) 1988 Seoul	13	5	38.46%	27 years, 345 days	6 ft 2.5 in (1.89 m)	201 lb (91 kg)	2nd of 12	
(Spain) 1992 Barcelona	13	7	53.85%	28 years, 348 days	6 ft 3.5 in (1.92 m)	203 lb (92 kg)	4th of 12	
(United States) 1996 Atlanta	13	5	38.46%	27 years, 24 days	6 ft 3.5 in (1.92 m)	203 lb (92 kg)	7th of 12	
(Australia) 2000 Sydney	13	6	46.15%	27 years, 353 days	6 ft 3.5 in (1.92 m)	205 lb (93 kg)	6th of 12	
(Greece) 2004 Athens	13	3	23.08%	25 years, 359 days	6 ft 3.5 in (1.92 m)	211 lb (96 kg)	7th of 12	
(China) 2008 Beijing	13	7	53.85%	27 years, 186 days	6 ft 4 in (1.93 m)	218 lb (99 kg)	2nd of 12	
(United Kingdom) 2012 London	13	10	76.92%	30 years, 316 days	6 ft 4.5 in (1.94 m)	220 lb (100 kg)	8th of 12	
(Brazil) 2016 Rio de Janeiro	13	4	30.77%	25 years, 251 days	6 ft 4.5 in (1.94 m)	220 lb (100 kg)	10th of 12	
Games	Number	Number	%	Age	Height	Weight	Finish	Ref
Games	Competitors	Returning Olympians		Average			Finish	Ref

==== Historical progression – returning Olympians ====
The following table shows the historical progression of the record of returning Olympians.

Returning Olympians	Achievement	Games	Date	Duration of record	Ref
0	Set record	(Belgium) 1920 Antwerp	Aug 24, 1920	3 years, 324 days	
1	Broke record	(France) 1924 Paris	Jul 13, 1924	4 years, 24 days	
4	Broke record	(Netherlands) 1928 Amsterdam	Aug 6, 1928	8 years, 2 days	
6	Broke record	(Germany) 1936 Berlin	Aug 8, 1936	36 years, 19 days	
7	Broke record	(West Germany) 1972 Munich	Aug 27, 1972	39 years, 337 days	
7	Tied record	(Spain) 1992 Barcelona	Aug 1, 1992	39 years, 337 days	
7	Tied record	(China) 2008 Beijing	Aug 10, 2008	39 years, 337 days	
10	Broke record	(United Kingdom) 2012 London	Jul 29, 2012	14 years, 64 days	

==== Historical progression – average age, height and weight ====
The following table shows the historical progression of the record of average age at the Olympic Games.

Average age	Achievement	Games	Date	Duration of record	Ref
26 years, 77 days	Set record	(Belgium) 1920 Antwerp	Aug 24, 1920	11 years, 348 days	
26 years, 220 days	Broke record	(United States) 1932 Los Angeles	Aug 6, 1932	4 years, 2 days	
29 years, 183 days	Broke record	(Germany) 1936 Berlin	Aug 8, 1936	11 years, 357 days	
31 years, 185 days	Broke record	(United Kingdom) 1948 London	Jul 30, 1948	78 years, 63 days	

The following table shows the historical progression of the record of average height at the Olympic Games.

Average height	Achievement	Games	Date	Duration of record	Ref
6 ft 1 in (1.85 m)	Set record	(Australia) 1956 Melbourne	Nov 28, 1956	27 years, 247 days	
6 ft 1 in (1.85 m)	Tied record	(West Germany) 1972 Munich	Aug 27, 1972	27 years, 247 days	
6 ft 2 in (1.88 m)	Broke record	(United States) 1984 Los Angeles	Aug 1, 1984	4 years, 51 days	
6 ft 2.5 in (1.89 m)	Broke record	(South Korea) 1988 Seoul	Sep 21, 1988	3 years, 315 days	
6 ft 3.5 in (1.92 m)	Broke record	(Spain) 1992 Barcelona	Aug 1, 1992	16 years, 9 days	
6 ft 3.5 in (1.92 m)	Tied record	(United States) 1996 Atlanta	Jul 20, 1996	16 years, 9 days	
6 ft 3.5 in (1.92 m)	Tied record	(Australia) 2000 Sydney	Sep 23, 2000	16 years, 9 days	
6 ft 3.5 in (1.92 m)	Tied record	(Greece) 2004 Athens	Aug 15, 2004	16 years, 9 days	
6 ft 4 in (1.93 m)	Broke record	(China) 2008 Beijing	Aug 10, 2008	3 years, 354 days	
6 ft 4.5 in (1.94 m)	Broke record	(United Kingdom) 2012 London	Jul 29, 2012	14 years, 64 days	
6 ft 4.5 in (1.94 m)	Tied record	(Brazil) 2016 Rio de Janeiro	Aug 6, 2016	14 years, 64 days	

The following table shows the historical progression of the record of average weight at the Olympic Games.

Average weight	Achievement	Games	Date	Duration of record	Ref
182 lb (83 kg)	Set record	(Australia) 1956 Melbourne	Nov 28, 1956	11 years, 321 days	
184 lb (83 kg)	Broke record	1968 Mexico City	Oct 14, 1968	3 years, 318 days	
188 lb (85 kg)	Broke record	(West Germany) 1972 Munich	Aug 27, 1972	11 years, 340 days	
190 lb (86 kg)	Broke record	(United States) 1984 Los Angeles	Aug 1, 1984	4 years, 51 days	
201 lb (91 kg)	Broke record	(South Korea) 1988 Seoul	Sep 21, 1988	3 years, 315 days	
203 lb (92 kg)	Broke record	(Spain) 1992 Barcelona	Aug 1, 1992	8 years, 53 days	
203 lb (92 kg)	Tied record	(United States) 1996 Atlanta	Jul 20, 1996	8 years, 53 days	
208 lb (94 kg)	Broke record	(Australia) 2000 Sydney	Sep 23, 2000	3 years, 327 days	
210 lb (95 kg)	Broke record	(Greece) 2004 Athens	Aug 15, 2004	3 years, 361 days	
218 lb (99 kg)	Broke record	(China) 2008 Beijing	Aug 10, 2008	3 years, 354 days	
220 lb (100 kg)	Broke record	(United Kingdom) 2012 London	Jul 29, 2012	14 years, 64 days	
220 lb (100 kg)	Tied record	(Brazil) 2016 Rio de Janeiro	Aug 6, 2016	14 years, 64 days	

== See also ==
- United States men's Olympic water polo team results
- United States men's Olympic water polo team statistics
  - United States men's Olympic water polo team statistics (appearances)
  - United States men's Olympic water polo team statistics (matches played)
  - United States men's Olympic water polo team statistics (scorers)
  - United States men's Olympic water polo team statistics (goalkeepers)
  - United States men's Olympic water polo team statistics (medalists)
- List of United States men's national water polo team rosters
- United States men's national water polo team
