= Charles Finn (water polo) =

American water polo player (1899–1974)

Charles Thornton Finn

Personal information
- Nationality: USA
- Born: July 28, 1899 Bakersfield, California, United States
- Died: January 13, 1974 (aged 74) Los Angeles, California, United States

Sport
- Sport: Water polo, Swimming
- Position: Center (WP)
- Club: Venice Swim Association; Los Angeles Athletic Club (LAAC)
- Coached by: Frank Rivas (Venice Swim); Clyde Swendsen (LAAC)
Medal record
Representing United States
Olympic Games
Bronze medal – third place	1932 Los Angeles	Team competition

Charles "Charlie" Thornton Finn (July 28, 1899 – January 13, 1974) was an American water polo player who competed for the Venice Swim Association and later for the Los Angeles Athletic Club. He participated as part of the Los Angeles Athletic Club in the 1932 Summer Olympics in Los Angeles, winning a team bronze medal, and in the 1936 Summer Olympics in Berlin where the U.S. team tied for ninth place.

Finn was born July 28, 1899, in Bakersfield, California. He competed in water polo and swimming for the Venice Swim Association on and off roughly from around 1918-1928, where he was coached primarily by Frank Rivas. In a Junior National water polo play-off competition on March 29, 1929, while representing the Venice Swim Association, Finn's team lost by a score of 8-6 in a water polo competition against the Los Angeles Athletic Club with Finn scoring the last point for Venice. In February, 1933, playing water polo for the Venice Plunge team, Finn helped defeat the Varsity team from the University of Southern California by a score of 12-3.

In both 1932 and 1936, Finn played with the Los Angeles Athletic Club team that won the Sr. National Outdoor Water Polo Championship, which was played to determine the U.S. National team. At the Los Angeles Athletic Club, Finn was coached primarily by Clyde Swendsen in water polo and in swimming by Fred Cady.

== Olympics ==
Finn played in his more competitive matches for the Los Angeles Athletic Club. The Los Angeles Club defeated the traditionally more dominant Illinois Athletic Club at the 1932 Olympic Trials at Brookside Park in Pasadena on July 22-23. Also selected as the first team of seven from the Los Angeles Club to represent the 1932 U.S. Olympic Water Polo team were F. Cal Strong, Philip Daubenspeck, Austin Clapp, Charles Harold McCallister, Herbert Wildman, and former Olympian Wallace O'Connor.

=== 1932 Los Angeles Olympic bronze ===
After qualifying at the trials, Finn, as the team's oldest member at 35, played with the 1932 U.S. Olympic team that won the bronze medal in the Men's Water Polo team competition. Hungary and Germany were the clear pre-Olympic favorites, but teams from only five countries participated because of the long journey to Los Angeles from Europe. Finn participated in all four matches played by the U.S. team. On August 6, the U.S. water polo team began their journey with an important 6–1 victory over the team from Brazil, and then on August 7, won a commanding 10–0 victory over the team from Japan. On August 9, the U.S. team consequently tied the very strong team from Germany by a score of 4–4. On August 11, the U.S. team lost 7–0 to the dominant team from Hungary on August 11. Having tied with the strong team from Germany on points scored, the U.S. received the bronze medal due to goal difference. The win was one of the U.S. team's few Olympic medals in water polo before a predominantly U.S. crowd, and helped give greater visibility to the sport among American audiences.

=== 1936 Berlin Olympics ===
Four years later, Finn's Los Angeles Athletic Club team placed first in the 1936 Olympic trials in Chicago. Travelling to Berlin, Finn participated at the 1936 Summer Olympics aged 39, where he was a member of the American team that was eliminated in the first round of the 1936 tournament. The U.S. team finished in a tie for ninth place, with pre-game favorites Hungary taking gold, Germany taking silver, and Belgium taking the bronze medal. Finn participated in all three matches played by the U.S. team.

== Honors ==
In 1983, he was inducted into the USA Water Polo Hall of Fame.

Finn died January 13, 1974 in greater Los Angeles and was buried in Woodlawn Cemetery in Santa Monica.

== See also ==
- List of Olympic medalists in water polo (men)
