= Charles McCallister =

American water polo player (1903–1997)

Charles McAllister
- A youthful McCallister

Personal information
- Full name: Charles Harold McAllister
- Nickname: "Dutch"
- National team: USA
- Born: October 14, 1903 Madison, South Dakota, U.S.
- Died: October 22, 1997 (aged 94) Los Angeles, California, United States
- Education: Stanford University (1925); U. Colorado Medical School
- Occupations: Physician, general practice
- Spouse: Hollys Lenore Krug

Sport
- Sport: Water polo
- Position: center back
- College team: Stanford University (1921-25)
- Club: Pacific Coast Club (1929-); Los Angeles Athletic Club (1931-87)
- Coached by: Clyde Swendsen (LAAC); Ernst Brandsten (Stanford)
Medal record
Representing United States
Olympic Games
| Bronze medal – third place | 1932 Los Angeles | Team competition |

Charles Harold "Dutch" McCallister, (October 14, 1903 – October 22, 1997) was an American water polo player who competed for Stanford University and represented the United States in the 1932 Summer Olympics in Los Angeles, winning a team bronze medal. He later participated in the 1936 Summer Olympics in Berlin, Germany where the water polo team was eliminated in the preliminary rounds, and tied for ninth. After graduating Stanford in 1925, and the University of Colorado School of Medicine, he had a forty-five-year career as a general practice physician in greater Los Angeles.

== Early life ==
McCallister was born October 14, 1903 in Madison, South Dakota to Nellie Morse McCallister, a schoolteacher, and Grover L. McCallister, a banker. With few siblings, McCallister had one older brother, Robert. By the age of six, he began swimming in South Dakota's Lake Madison, occasionally attending competitions there with his brother. His family relocated to Los Angeles when he was ten. While living in greater Los Angeles, he attended Long Beach Polytechnic High School, where he participated in football, and swimming and competed as a member of Long Beach Poly's Water Polo team from 1918-1921. While at Long Beach Poly, he helped lead the water polo team to win the 1921 California High School State championship.

== Stanford University ==
McCallister attended Stanford University, graduating in 1925 where his water polo and swimming coaches was likely two-time Olympian Ernst Brandsten. Well-known on campus, he served as President of the Stanford Class of 1925, majored in pre-medical studies, and was a member of Phi Kappa Psi Fraternity. As in High School, he continued to participate in cheerleading, functioning as a "Yell leader", during sports events. Four-time Olympian Wally O'Connor was one of McCallister's teammates on the Stanford Water polo and swim team. While at Stanford, McCallister briefly was a member of the boxing team. He competed on Stanford's water polo team from around 1921-1924, where he served as Captain in his Senior year. During his tenure with Stanford, his water polo team won the Pacific Coast Conference team championship successively from 1923-1925.

In National competition, McCallister captured American Athletic Union titles as part of the Los Angeles Athletic Club in both 1932 and 1936.

== 1932-1936 Olympics ==
=== 1932 Los Angeles ===
McCallister's Los Angeles Athletic Club defeated the traditionally more dominant Illinois Athletic Club at the 1932 Olympic Trials in Pasadena on July 22-23. While in training at the Los Angeles Athletic Club, McCallister was coached primarily by Clyde Swendsen in water polo.

Also selected as the first team of seven from the Los Angeles Club to represent the 1932 U.S. Olympic Water Polo team were F. Cal Strong, Austin Clapp, Herbert Wildman, Charles Finn, Philip Daubenspeck, and former Olympian Wallace O'Connor. O'Connor was one of the most experienced Olympians and by 1936 would serve as team Captain.

In the 1932 Los Angeles Olympics, McCallister was part of the American water polo team which won the bronze medal. He played all four matches. Hungary took the Gold medal and Germany took the silver. McCallister played Center Back, a position requiring skilled passing and close coordination with the team. Hungary and Germany were the clear pre-Olympic favorites at the 1932, but teams from only five countries participated because of the long boat passage to Los Angeles from Europe. On August 6, the U.S. water polo team began their journey with an important 6–1 victory over the team from Brazil, and then on August 7, won a commanding 10–0 victory over the team from Japan. On August 9, the U.S. team consequently tied the very strong team from Germany by a score of 4–4. On August 11, the U.S. team lost 7–1 to the dominant team from Hungary. McCallister participated in all four matches.

Having tied with the team from Germany on points scored, the U.S. received the bronze medal due to goal difference. The win was the U.S. team's first Olympic medal in water polo before a predominantly U.S. crowd, and helped give greater visibility to the sport among American audiences.

=== 1936 Berlin ===
Four years later at the 1936 Summer Olympics in Berlin, Germany. McAllister was a member of the American water polo team which was eliminated from medal contention in the preliminary rounds of the 1936 tournament and did not advance to the semi-finals, ending with a tie for ninth place. He played all three matches.

After completing his studies at Stanford in 1925, McCallister graduated the University of Colorado School of Medicine in Denver, and began a career as a physician with a general practice where he continued to work for forty-five years, retiring around 1975.

=== Marriage ===
Having begun his practice as a physician, McCallister married Hollys Lenore Krug on September 1, 1939 at South Pasadena's Episcopal Church. Hollys, known as Holly, was a graduate of the University of Southern California, and a member of Delta Gamma Sorority. McCallister met her while briefly living at USC in preparation for the 1932 Olympic games. After a honeymoon in Honolulu, the couple planned to live in Huntington, but moved to San Marino in 1949.

Excelling in badminton, and table tennis, and enjoying handball, McCallister was a member of the Los Angeles Athletic Club from 1931-1987. In later years, he became a member of the City of San Marino Club, and the Old-Timers Club of Southern California. After retiring from his medical practice around 1975, he stayed active and continued to compete once a year in Masters swimming meets through the age of 80.

He died October 22, 1997 at the age of 94 in San Marino, California.

=== Honors ===
In 1980, he was inducted into the USA Water Polo Hall of Fame.

== See also ==
- List of Olympic medalists in water polo (men)
