= Purgly =

Purgly is a surname. Notable people with the surname include:

- Emil Purgly (1880–1964), Hungarian politician
- Magdolna Purgly (1881–1959), Hungarian noble
