= Hans Schultz =

Hans Schultz may refer to:

- Hans Schultz (sport shooter) (1864–1937)
- Sgt. Hans Schultz, a character from the American television series Hogan's Heroes

== See also ==
- Hans Schulz (1939–2012), German sprinter
- Hans Schulze (1911–1992), German water polo player
