= Tokito =

Tokito (written 時任 or 時東) is a surname of Japanese origin. Notable people with this surname include:

== People with the surname ==
- Ami Tokito (時東 ぁみ; born 1987), Japanese singer
- Ayumi Tokitō (時任 亜弓; born 1974), Japanese actress
- Iwao Tokito (時任 巌), Japanese water polo player
- Saburō Tokitō (時任 三郎; born 1958), Japanese actor

== People with the given name ==
- Tokito Oda (小田 凱人; born 2006), Japanese professional wheelchair tennis player

== Fictional characters ==
- Muichiro Tokito (時透 無一郎), supporting character in Demon Slayer: Kimetsu no Yaiba
