= Miklós Sárkány =

Hungarian water polo player

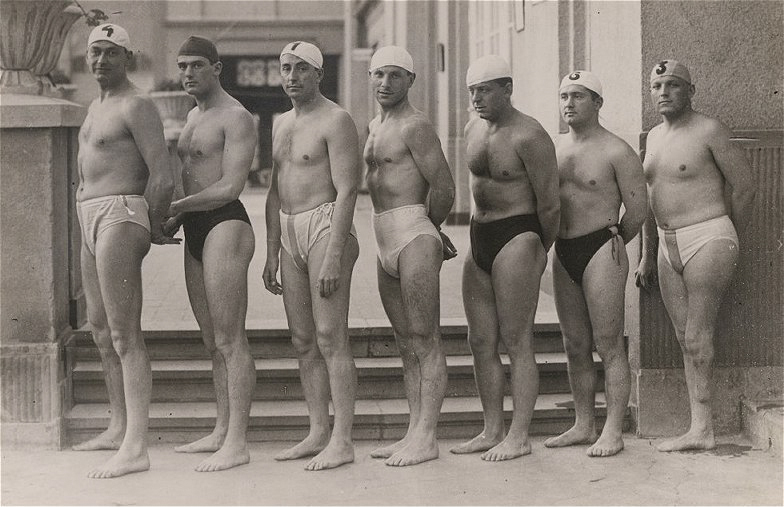

Personal information
- Born: 15 August 1908 Budapest, Austria-Hungary
- Died: 20 December 1998 (aged 90) Vienna, Austria

Sport
- Sport: Water polo
Medal record
Representing Hungary
Olympic Games
Gold medal – first place	1932 Los Angeles	Team competition
Gold medal – first place	1936 Berlin	Team competition

Miklós Sárkány (15 August 1908 – 20 December 1998) was a Hungarian water polo player and Olympic gold medalist.

== Career ==
He competed in the 1932 Summer Olympics and the 1936 Summer Olympics. He was born in Budapest.

In 1932 he was part of the Hungarian team that won the gold medal, though he played only one match.

Four years later he again won the gold medal with the Hungarian team, playing three matches at the historic 1936 Summer Olympics in Berlin, sponsored by the Nazi government. Sárkány was Jewish and was one of around thirteen Jewish athletes who won medals. Many Hungarian Jews shared their fellow citizens' passion for sport and viewed participation as a means of assimilation. In the 1930s, however, the antisemitism of the fascist, pro-Nazi Hungarian government pervaded some fields of sport.

He died on 20 December 1998 in Vienna, Austria. He was cremated at Feuerhalle Simmering, where his ashes are buried. His 1932 Olympic team member Sándor Ivády died one day later.

== See also ==
- Hungary men's Olympic water polo team records and statistics
- List of Olympic champions in men's water polo
- List of Olympic medalists in water polo (men)
- List of select Jewish water polo players
