= Cal Strong =

American water polo player (1907–2001)

F. Calvert Strong
Personal information
- National team: USA
- Born: August 12, 1907 Jacksonville, Illinois, United States
- Died: January 27, 2001 (aged 93) Carmichael, California, United States
- Education: Stanford University
- Occupation: Stockbroker
- Spouse: Rosemary (m. 1941)

Sport
- Sport: Water polo
- Position: guard (WP)
- College team: Stanford University
- Club: Los Angeles Athletic Club (LAAC)
- Coached by: Clyde Swendsen (WP) (LAAC); Ernst Brandsten (Stanford)
Medal record
Representing United States
Olympic Games
Bronze medal – third place	1932 Los Angeles	Team competition

F. Calvert Strong (August 12, 1907 – January 27, 2001) was an American water polo player who competed for Stanford University and participated in the 1932 Summer Olympics winning a team bronze medal in water polo. After graduating Stanford and marrying, he had a long and successful career as a Stockbroker in California.

== Early life ==
Strong was born in Jacksonville, Illinois on August 12, 1907. The family moved first to Pewee Valley, Kentucky, near Louisville, and then to Long Beach California in 1913. While attending grammar school at Horace Mann Elementary, Strong helped raise funds and served as Captain with a team of classmates to furnish the boy's facilities at a new YMCA Building in Long Beach, California. Strong played basketball and other sports for the Horace Mann Hummers, and competed in YMCA competition in the Bible Class league. He later attended Long Beach Poly High School where he competed in water polo from 1921-1924, and served as team Captain in 1924. Though pools were somewhat scarce in the 1920's, Long Beach Poly had their own pool providing a ready training facility.

Roughly from 1929-1936, he played water polo for the Los Angeles Athletic Club.

== Stanford University ==
Strong attended and played water polo for Stanford University from 1925-1928, where he pledged the Phi Delta Theta Fraternity. In 1929, he captained the Stanford team, who were Pacific Athletic Conference-8 Conference champions in 1927, 1928, and 1929. He was coached at Stanford by Hall of Fame Coach Ernst Brandsten.

== Olympics ==
Strong was chosen to compete for the U.S. at the 1928 Olympics as an alternate, but was still attending Stanford and decided not to attend as he was serving as a lifeguard that summer, need to earn money for school, and believed he would not get to play if he attended the Olympics. He was later chosen for the 1936 Olympic team, but decided not to attend as he had only recently begun a job as a broker at Dean Witter.

=== 1932 Los Angeles Olympic bronze ===
Strong played for the Los Angeles Allied Athletic Club where he was coached primarily by Clyde Swendsen and in swimming by Fred Cady. Strong's water polo team defeated the traditionally more dominant Illinois Athletic Club at the 1932 Olympic Trials at Brookside Park in Pasadena on July 22-23. Also selected as the first team of seven from the Los Angeles Club to represent the 1932 U.S. Olympic Water Polo team were Philip Daubenspeck, Austin Clapp, Harold Charles McCallister, Charles Finn, Herbert Wildman, and former Olympian Wallace O'Connor.

After qualifying at the trials, Strong played with the 1932 U.S. Olympic team that won the bronze medal in the Men's Water Polo team competition. Hungary and Germany were the clear pre-Olympic favorites, but teams from only five countries participated because of the long journey to Los Angeles. Hungary and Germany were the clear pre-Olympic favorites at the 1932 Olympics, but teams from only five countries participated because of the long boat passage to Los Angeles from Europe. On August 6, the U.S. water polo team began their Olympic journey with an important 6–1 victory over the team from Brazil, and then on August 7, won a commanding 10–0 victory over the team from Japan. On August 9, the U.S. team tied the very strong team from Germany by a score of 4–4. On August 11, the U.S. team lost 7–1 to the dominant team from Hungary. Strong played for the U.S. in all four matches. Hungary won the gold medal, and the team from Germany captured the silver. Strong participated in all four matches. Having tied with the team from Germany on points scored, the U.S. received the bronze medal due to goal difference. The third-place finish resulted in the U.S. team's first Olympic medal in water polo before a predominantly U.S. crowd, and helped give greater visibility to the sport among American audiences.

=== Later life ===
After graduating from Stanford, Strong worked on the floor of the Los Angeles Stock Exchange, and continued working as a stockbroker in California throughout his life.

Strong was married to UCLA graduate Rosemary "Rod" Strong around 1941, and had two children. They lived much of their lives around Long Beach, while later retiring to Carmichael, California.

He died at the age of 97 in Carmichael, California on January 27, 2001, and was survived by wife Rosemary, two children, and grandchildren.

=== Honors ===
In 1981, he was inducted into the USA Water Polo Hall of Fame.

== See also ==
- List of Olympic medalists in water polo (men)
