= Herbert Wildman =

American water polo player (2000–2027)

Personal information
- Full name: Herbert Henry Wildman
- Nicknames: Herb, Herbie
- National team: USA
- Born: September 6, 1912 Marion, Ohio, U.S.
- Died: October 13, 1989 (aged 77) Los Angeles, California, U.S.
- Occupations: Owner Auto Service Station; Marina del Rey, CA
- Spouse: Naomi D. Richmond (m. 1945)
- Children: 2

Sport
- Sport: Water polo
- Position: goalkeeper
- Club: Venice Swimming Association; Los Angeles Athletic Club (LAAC)
- Coached by: Frank Rivas, (Venice SA, 32 Olympics); Clyde Swendsen (LAAC)
Medal record
Representing United States
Olympic Games
Bronze medal – third place	1932 Los Angeles	Team competition

Herbert "Herbie" Henry Wildman (September 6, 1912 – October 13, 1989) was an American water polo player who competed with the Los Angeles Athletic Club in both the 1932 Summer Olympics in Los Angeles where he won a team bronze medal, and in the 1936 Summer Olympics in Berlin where the U.S. team tied for ninth place. After serving in the Merchant Marines in WWII, he owned and operated a service station and garage in Marina del Ray with his wife Naomi for around thirty years. He later served as a volunteer for the 1984 Los Angeles and 1988 Calgary Olympics, raced his sailboat in the Encinada Race, and was a Water Polo Hall of Fame inductee in 1983.

== Early life ==
Wildman was born September 6, 1912 in Marion, Ohio, to father Leon L. Wildman and mother Viola B. Wildman as the first of two children. When the family moved to Fort Wayne, Indiana, Herbert's father worked for the Studebaker Wagon Company which became the automobile company. After another family move to California when he was around eleven, Wildman attended LeConte Junior High in Hollywood, where he began playing softball and baseball. He started swimming frequently after hours at the Hollywood Athletic Club, where he knew an employee. Graduating in 1930, he later attended Venice High School in greater Los Angeles where his High School team placed first in the state championships in 1930. Wildman Captained the Venice High water polo team in his Senior year in 1930, though he was a utility player and not yet a goaltender, and played a variety of positions.

Beginning around 1929-30, he competed for the Venice Swim Association under Coach Frank Rivas, where he soon began playing goalkeeper. The Venice Swim Association trained at the Venice Plunge, and as a youth Wildman would do odd jobs there to swim for free and maintain his membership. When the Venice Club began having financial difficulties, most of the members became part of the Los Angeles Athletic Club. As Wildman enjoyed boating as a young man, he had a small boat he kept at the Venice Pier in High School, skippered a fishing boat at a young age in the 1930's and also ran a few recreational boats.

In 1932 and 1936, Wildman was part of the Los Angeles Athletic Club team that won the Senior Outdoor National Championship, part of qualifying for the U.S. Olympic team. At the Los Angeles Athletic Club, he was coached primarily by Clyde Swendsen in water polo and in swimming by Fred Cady.

Wildman was first married in the 1930's and had two children, a boy and a girl.

== Olympics ==
=== 1932 Olympic trials ===
Wildman played for the Los Angeles Allied Athletic Club at the 1932 Olympics. His team defeated the traditionally more dominant Illinois Athletic Club at the 1932 Olympic Trials at Brookside Park in Pasadena on July 22-23. Also selected as the first team of seven from the Los Angeles Club to represent the 1932 U.S. Olympic Water Polo team were F. Cal Strong, Austin Clapp, Charles Harold McAllister, Charles Finn, Philip Daubenspeck, and former Olympian Wallace O'Connor. O'Connor was one of the most experienced Olympians and by 1936 would serve as team Captain.

=== 1932 Los Angeles Olympics ===
After qualifying at the Olympic trials in Pasadena, California, Wildman played with the 1932 U.S. Olympic team that won the bronze medal in the Men's Water Polo team competition. Hungary and Germany were the clear pre-Olympic favorites, but teams from only five countries participated because of the long journey to Los Angeles. On August 6, the U.S. water polo team began their journey with an important 6–1 victory over the team from Brazil, and then on August 7, won a commanding 10–0 victory over the team from Japan. On August 9, the U.S. team consequently tied the very strong team from Germany by a score of 4–4. On August 11, the U.S. team lost 7–1 to the dominant team from Hungary. Wildman played for the U.S. as goaltender in all four matches.

Having tied with the team from Germany on points scored, the U.S. received the bronze medal due to goal difference. The win was the U.S. team's first Olympic medal in water polo before a predominantly U.S. crowd, and helped give greater visibility to the sport among American audiences.

In the games against Germany and Hungary, Wildman, as team goalie blocked four shots attempted on goal in penalty shots, and blocked three other penalty shots in another game, greatly increasing America's chances of taking a medal. Hungary won the gold medal, and the team from Germany captured the silver. Wildman played all four matches for the U.S. team as goalkeeper.

=== 1936 Berlin Olympics ===
Four years later, Wildman's Los Angeles Athletic Club team placed first in the 1936 Olympic trials in Chicago. After travelling to Berlin on the USS Manhattan, he participated in the 1936 Summer Olympics in Berlin where the American water polo team was eliminated in the first round of the 1936 water polo team championship, finishing in a tie for ninth place. The U.S. lost first to Belgium and then Holland by one point each, and then defeated the team from Uruguay. Hungary took the gold, Germany took the silver, and Belgium took the bronze. Wildman participated in all three of the preliminary matches played by the U.S. team. He played two matches as goalkeeper. On his return to U.S., landing first in New York, after sailing on the United States, a ticker tape parade was held to honor the returning U.S. Olympic team.

In training with the U.S. team in the two years subsequent to the 1936 Olympics, Wildman averaged around 5 miles swimming daily, and worked out 5-6 days with the team. He retired from Water Polo and swimming competition around 1939, partly as a result of learning there would be no 1940 Olympics.

== WWII service ==
Possessing a Skipper's and shipping Engineer's liscense, Wildman served in the Merchant Marines in WWII, operating and maintaining 98-foot tugboats. By war's end he was a chief engineer over six tuboats near Port Hueneme and performed maintenance on diesel engines. During a portion of his service, he continued to work operating his service station taking two 18-hour shifts weekly, and simultaneously working as a ships engineer for the merchant marines.

=== Later life ===
After divorcing his first wife, in 1945 he married Naomi D. Richmond, whom he had known since seventh grade in High School. Naomi kept the books for his auto service station in Marina del Ray. After 1967, the couple lived in a condominium in Marina del Ray's Villa Imperia. In his later life, he enjoyed diving and racing his 42-foot sailboat, winning the Ensenada Race in 1961, and placing well in several other years. An enthusiastic and accomplished sailor, Wildman participated in the Ensenada Race from 1956-1970, one of the world's largest races open to international competition. He officially retired from working at his service station in 1972, and was a Rotarian for 34 years, serving a term as President in the early 1960's. In service to the community during his retirement, he worked with Andrew Strenk, a 1968 Olympian, doing planning for the 1984 Olympics, where he logged 400 hours, and helped later to promote the Calgary Winter Olympics in 1988, serving on the Olympic committee.

Wildman died at 77 on October 13, 1989, in greater Los Angeles, California. He was survived by his wife Naomi, and four grandchildren. Of his two children from his former marriage, his son survived him, and his daughter pre-deceased him.

=== Honors ===
In 1983, partly for his service as an Olympian that won the first U.S. bronze medal in water polo, he was inducted into the USA Water Polo Hall of Fame.

== See also ==
- List of Olympic medalists in water polo (men)
- List of men's Olympic water polo tournament goalkeepers
