= Akira Fujita =

Japanese swimmer and water polo player

Personal information
- Nationality: Japanese
- Born: 1 January 1908 Hiroshima, Japan
- Died: 29 May 2001 (aged 93) Minato, Japan

Sport
- Sport: Water polo
- College team: Waseda University, Tokyo
National team
- Years: Team
- ?-?: Japan

Akira Fujita (藤田 明, 1 January 1908 - 29 May 2001) was a Japanese male water polo player. He was a member of the Japan men's national water polo team. He competed with the team at the 1932 Summer Olympics.
