= Pedro Theberge =

Brazilian water polo player

Personal information
- Born: 20 February 1908 Rio de Janeiro, Brazil
- Died: 24 June 1972 (aged 64)

Sport
- Sport: Water polo

Pedro Theberge (20 February 1908 – 24 June 1972) was a Brazilian water polo player. He competed in the men's tournament at the 1932 Summer Olympics.
