= Hans Eckstein =

German water polo player

Personal information
- Born: December 15, 1908 Leipzig, German Empire
- Died: March 13, 1985 (aged 76) Leipzig, East Germany

Sport
- Sport: Water polo
Medal record
Representing Germany
Olympic Games
Silver medal – second place	1932 Los Angeles	Team competition

Johannes "Hans" Eckstein (December 15, 1908 – March 13, 1985) was a German water polo player who competed in the 1932 Summer Olympics. He was part of the German team which won the silver medal. He played one match as goalkeeper.

== See also ==
- Germany men's Olympic water polo team records and statistics
- List of Olympic medalists in water polo (men)
- List of men's Olympic water polo tournament goalkeepers
