= Emil Benecke =

German water polo player (1898–1945)

Personal information
- Born: October 4, 1898 Magdeburg, German Empire
- Died: July 12, 1945 (aged 46) Riga, Soviet Union

Sport
- Sport: Water polo
Medal record
Representing Germany
Olympic Games
Gold medal – first place	1928 Amsterdam	Team competition
Silver medal – second place	1932 San Francisco	Team competition

Emil Benecke (4 October 1898 – 12 July 1945) was a German water polo player who competed in the 1928 Summer Olympics and in the 1932 Summer Olympics. He was born in Magdeburg and played for the local club "Hellas" Magdeburg. In 1928 he was part of the German team which won the gold medal. He played all three matches and scored three goals. Four years later he won the silver medal with the German team. He played all four matches. Benecke also was referee at the 1936 Summer Olympics.

He died briefly after the end of World War II in Russian war captivity in Riga, Soviet Union.

== See also ==
- Germany men's Olympic water polo team records and statistics
- List of Olympic champions in men's water polo
- List of Olympic medalists in water polo (men)
