= Salvador Amendola =

Brazilian water polo player (1906–1976)

Personal information
- Full name: Salvador Amendola Filho
- Born: 13 May 1906 Rio de Janeiro, Brazil
- Died: 24 September 1976 (aged 70) Rio de Janeiro, Brazil

Sport
- Sport: Water polo

Salvador Amendola (13 May 1906 – 24 September 1976) was a Brazilian water polo player. He competed in the men's tournament at the 1932 Summer Olympics.
