= Seibei Kimura =

Japanese water polo player

Personal information
- Nationality: Japanese
- Born: 11 October 1911

Sport
- Sport: Water polo

Seibei Kimura (木村 清兵衛, Kimura Seibei, born 11 October 1911, date of death unknown) was a Japanese water polo player. He competed in the men's tournament at the 1932 Summer Olympics.
