= Wally O'Connor =

American swimmer and water polo player

Personal information
- Full name: James Wallace O'Connor
- National team: United States
- Born: August 25, 1903 Madera, California, U.S.
- Died: October 11, 1950 (aged 47) West Los Angeles, California, U.S.

Sport
- Sport: Swimming
- Strokes: Freestyle, water polo
- Club: Venice Swimming Association; Los Angeles Athletic Club; Illinois Athletic Club
- College team: Stanford University 1927
- Coach: Frank Rivas (Venice Swim); Ernst Brandsten (Stanford); Clyde Swendsen, Fred Cady (LAAC)
Medal record
Representing the United States
Olympic Games
Men's swimming
Gold medal – first place	1924 Paris	4x200 m freestyle
Men's water polo
Bronze medal – third place	1924 Paris	Team competition
Bronze medal – third place	1932 Los Angeles	Team competition

James Wallace O'Connor (August 25, 1903 – October 11, 1950) was an American competition swimmer and water polo player for Stanford University who played internationally for the United States at four Olympiads, which included the 1924, 1928, 1932 and 1936 Olympics. He won a gold medal in the 1924 Paris Olympics for swimming in the world record setting U.S. 4x200 freestyle relay, and took home a bronze medal for Water Polo in both the 1924 and 1932 Olympics. He is rated by many sports historians as the greatest American Water Polo player of all time for his Collegiate and Olympic achievements in the sport.

O'Connor was born in Madera, California on August 25, 1903. He attended Venice High School, and swam for their team from 1916-1919.

== Stanford University ==
O'Connor swam and played Water Polo for Stanford University from 1920-1923, under Head Coach Ernst Brandsten. He captained Stanford's Water Polo team in 1923 and was the only Stanford athlete to ever participate in four Olympics. He helped lead Stanford to Pacific Athletic Conference-8 championships in all four years of his participation, which included 1920, 1921, 1922, and 1923.

From 1923-1936, he swam and played Water Polo for the Venice Swim Association, and the Los Angeles and Illinois Athletic Clubs. He first served as Captain of the Venice Swimming Association team from 1929-1931 where he was coached by Frank Rivas. and then was as Captain of the Los Angeles Athletic Club Water Polo Team in 1931, 33, 34, 35, and 36. While training with the Los Angeles Athletic Club, he was coached primarily by Clyde Swendsen in water polo and in swimming by Fred Cady. O'Connor swam on a National Championship relay for Hall of Fame coach Bill Bachrach’s Illinois Athletic Club.

== 4 Olympics; 1924-1936 ==
=== 1924 Paris Olympics ===
In team sport at the 1924 Summer Olympics, O'Connor won a gold medal as a member of the winning U.S. team in the men's 4×200-meter freestyle relay, together with teammates Ralph Breyer, Harrison Glancy and Johnny Weissmuller. Playing with the 1924 U.S. national water polo team O'Connor also won a bronze medal, playing one match.

=== 1928 Amsterdam Olympics ===
At the 1928 Summer Olympics bronze medal match, O'Connor and the U.S. Water Polo team lost to France and Belgium. He played two matches and scored one goal.

=== 1932 Los Angeles Olympics ===
At the 1932 Olympic trails in Pasadena, California, Clapp's Los Angeles Allied Athletic Club defeated the traditionally more dominant Illinois Athletic Club in the water polo finals at the 1932 Olympic Trials in Pasadena on July 22-23. Also selected with O'Connor as the first team of seven from the Los Angeles Club to represent the 1932 U.S. Olympic Water Polo team were F. Cal Strong, Philip Daubenspeck, Charles Harold McCallister, Herbert Wildman, and former Olympian Austin Clapp. O'Connor was one of five water polo players from Stanford on the 1932 Olympic team, including second team and alternates.

At the 1932 Summer Olympics the U.S. Water Polo team won a bronze medal. O'Connor played all four matches. Hungary took the Gold medal and Germany took the silver. Hungary and Germany were the clear pre-Olympic favorites at the 1932 Olympics, but teams from only five countries participated because of the long boat passage to Los Angeles from Europe. On August 6, the U.S. water polo team began their Olympic journey with an important 6–1 victory over the team from Brazil, and then on August 7, won a commanding 10–0 victory over the team from Japan. On August 9, the U.S. team consequently tied the very strong team from Germany by a score of 4–4. On August 11, the U.S. team lost 7–1 to the dominant team from Hungary.

Having tied with the team from Germany on points scored, the U.S. received the bronze medal due to goal difference. The win marked U.S. team's first Olympic medal in water polo at a U.S. location, and helped give greater visibility to the sport among American audiences.

=== 1936 Berlin Olympics ===
At the 1936 Summer Olympics, playing with the Los Angeles Athletic Club, the U.S. Water Polo team won one match and lost two matches in the preliminary group of the tournament. O'Connor played all three matches. He was honored as the national flag bearer at the opening ceremonies.

O'Connor made a fifth Olympic team in 1940, but the war in Europe prevented those Games from being held.

=== WWII service ===
O'Connor was part of the Venice Life Guarding corps. During WWI, he served as a Maritime service instructor.

O'Connor died at age 47 on August 11, 1950 at a Los Angeles Hospital after a short illness. Services were held on October 13 at the Gates, Kingsley, and Gates Mortuary in Santa Monica.

== Honors ==
In 1976, he was among the first 25 Charter Members inducted into the USA Water Polo Hall of Fame. He was also elected to the Citizens Savings Athletic Foundation Hall of Fame, and the prestigious International Swimming Hall of Fame in 1966.

== See also ==
- List of athletes with Olympic medals in different disciplines
- List of Olympic medalists in swimming (men)
- List of Olympic medalists in water polo (men)
- List of players who have appeared in multiple men's Olympic water polo tournaments
- List of members of the International Swimming Hall of Fame
- List of Stanford University people
- World record progression 4 × 200 metres freestyle relay
