= Tosuke Sawami =

Japanese water polo player

Personal information
- Nationality: Japanese
- Born: 31 March 1910

Sport
- Sport: Water polo

Tosuke Sawami (沢海東助, Sawami Tōsuke, born 31 March 1910, date of death unknown) was a Japanese water polo player. He competed in the men's tournament at the 1932 Summer Olympics.
