= Mario de Lorenzo =

Brazilian water polo player

Personal information
- Born: 23 June 1912 São Paulo, Brazil

Sport
- Sport: Water polo

Mario de Lorenzo (born June 23, 1912, date of death unknown) was a Brazilian water polo player. He competed in the men's tournament at the 1932 Summer Olympics.
