= Shuji Doi =

Japanese water polo player

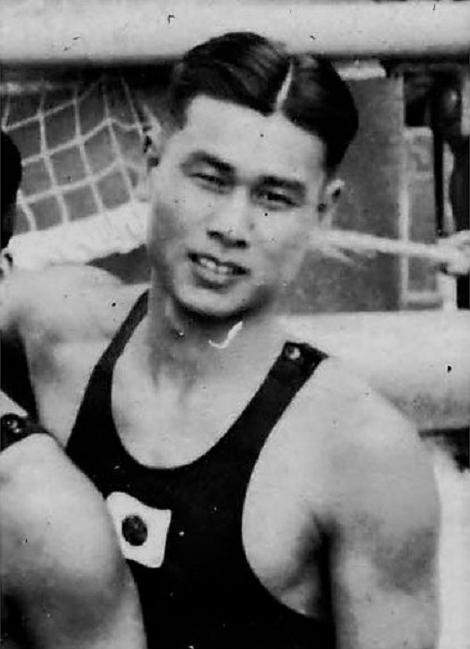

Personal information
- Native name: 土井 修爾
- Nationality: Japanese
- Born: 1 October 1909; Hiroshima, Hiroshima Prefecture, Japanese Empire
- Died: 7 July 1938 (aged 28); Hiroshima, Hiroshima Prefecture, Japanese Empire

Sport
- Sport: Water polo

Shuji Doi (土井 修爾, Doi Shūji, 1 October 1909 – 7 July 1938) was a Japanese water polo player. He competed in the men's tournament at the 1932 Summer Olympics. He died of wounds suffered in the Second Sino-Japanese War.
