= Béla Ivády =

Hungarian politician (1873–1962)

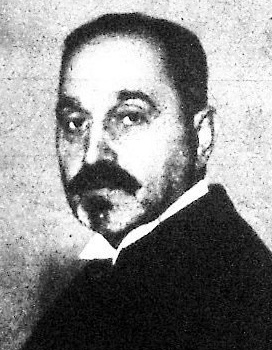

Minister of Agriculture of Hungary
- In office 24 August 1931 – 4 February 1932
- Preceded by: János Mayer
- Succeeded by: Emil Purgly

Personal details
- Born: 14 November 1873 Fólya, Kingdom of Hungary, Austria-Hungary
- Died: 19 March 1962 (aged 88) Budapest, People's Republic of Hungary
- Political party: Unity Party, Party of National Unity
- Profession: politician

Béla Ivády de Ivád (14 November 1873 – 19 March 1962) was a Hungarian politician, who served as Minister of Agriculture between 1931 and 1932. He also served as acting leader of the Party of National Unity (NEP) in 1933.

His son was Sándor Ivády, water polo player and Olympic gold medalist.

Political offices
Preceded by János Mayer	Minister of Agriculture; 1931–1932	Succeeded by Emil Purgly
