= Philip Daubenspeck =

American water polo player (1906–1951)

Philip B. Daubenspeck
- Daubenspeck in the 1930s

Personal information
- Full name: Philip Burton Daubenspeck
- National team: USA
- Born: October 28, 1906 Los Angeles, United States
- Died: March 6, 1951 (aged 44) Los Angeles, United States

Sport
- Sport: Water polo, Swimming
- Position: Guard (WP)
- Club: Venice Swim Association; Los Angeles Athletic Club (LAC)
- Coached by: Frank Rivas, James Yuill (Venice); Clyde Swendsen (LAC)
Medal record
Representing United States
Olympic Games
Bronze medal – third place	1932 Los Angeles	Team competition

Philip Burton Daubenspeck (October 28, 1905 – March 6, 1951) was an American water polo player who competed in the 1932 Summer Olympics, winning a team bronze medal, and also participated in the 1936 Summer Olympics in Berlin where the team tied for ninth place.

Daubenspeck was born October 28, 1905 in Los Angeles, California and attended Venice High School, in greater Los Angeles, where he competed in Water Polo during his High School years from 1923-4. In 1928, Daubenspeck played Water Polo for the Venice Plunge Swimming Association, under Head Coach James Yuill. He competed in swimming under Frank Rivas with the Venice Swim Club, and was picked by Coach Rivas for his All-Pacific Coast team, along with fellow 1932 Olympians Wally O'Connor and Charlie Finn. As a swimmer in 1928, Daubenspeck competed and excelled in the breaststroke, the 300-yard medley, and at times in the 100 and 220-yard freestyles for the Venice Swimming Association. According to the Independent, Daubenspeck won a national championship in the 50-yard freestyle in 1925. In February 1929, representing the Venice Swim Association under Coach Frank Rivas, Phil Daubenspeck's team defeated the Pacific Coast Club in water polo 9-7, with Daubenspeck scoring around four goals, and coming close to clinching the Southern California League Championship. Daubenspeck competed for the Los Angeles Athletic Club primarily from 1932-1936 where he was coached primarily by Clyde Swendsen in water polo and in swimming by Fred Cady, having earlier competed for the Venice Swim Association. Daubenspeck's brother Earl also played water polo and competed with him on the Los Angeles Athletic Club team in 1933.

In 1932, Daubenspeck was part of the Los Angeles Athletic Club team that won the Senior Outdoor National Championship.

== 1932-1936 Olympics ==
Daubenspeck played for the Los Angeles Allied Athletic Club. His team defeated the traditionally more dominant Illinois Athletic Club at the 1932 Olympic Trials in Pasadena on July 22–23. Also selected as the first team of seven from the Los Angeles Club to represent the 1932 U.S. Olympic Water Polo team, were F. Cal Strong, Austin Clapp, Harold Charles McCallister, Charles Finn, Herbert Wildman, and former Olympian Wallace O'Connor.

After qualifying at the trials, Daubenspeck played with the 1932 U.S. Olympic team that won the bronze medal in the Men's Water Polo team competition. Hungary and Germany were the clear pre-Olympic favorites, but teams from only five countries participated because of the long journey to Los Angeles. Strong played for the U.S. in all four matches. Hungary won the gold medal, and the team from Germany captured the silver. Daubenspeck played all four matches for the U.S. team.

Four years later, Daubenspeck's Los Angeles Athletic Club team placed first in the 1936 Olympic trials in Chicago. At the 1936 Summer Olympics in Berlin he was a member of the American team that was eliminated in the first round of the 1936 tournament, finishing in a tie for ninth place. Hungary took gold, Germany silver, and Belgium took the bronze medal. Daubenspeck participated in all three of the preliminary matches played by the U.S. team.

Daubenspeck died March 6, 1951, around the age of 44 in greater Los Angeles.

=== Honors ===
In 1960, he was voted into Venice High School's Athletic Hall of Fame. In 1976, for his national championships and Olympic accomplishments, he was inducted into the USA Water Polo Hall of Fame.

== See also ==
- List of Olympic medalists in water polo (men)
