= Jefferson Souza (water polo) =

Brazilian water polo player

Personal information
- Born: June 1908 Rio de Janeiro, Brazil
- Died: 1 December 1992

Sport
- Sport: Water polo

Jefferson Souza (June 1908 – 1 December 1992) was a Brazilian water polo player. He competed in the men's tournament at the 1932 Summer Olympics.
