= Antônio Jacobina Filho =

Brazilian water polo player

Personal information
- Full name: Antônio de Araujo Ferreira Jacobina Filho
- Born: 22 September 1906; Rio de Janeiro, Brazil
- Died: 7 April 1994 (aged 87); Rio de Janeiro, Brazil

Sport
- Sport: Water polo

Antônio Jacobina Filho (22 September 1906 – 7 April 1994) was a Brazilian water polo player. He competed in the men's tournament at the 1932 Summer Olympics.
