= Adhemar Serpa =

Brazilian water polo player

Personal information
- Born: 7 October 1898; Rio de Janeiro, Brazil
- Died: 4 November 1979 (aged 81)

Sport
- Sport: Water polo

Adhemar Serpa (7 October 1898 – 4 November 1978) was a Brazilian water polo player. He competed in the men's tournament at the 1932 Summer Olympics.
