= Otto Cordes =

German water polo player

Personal information
- Born: 31 August 1905 Magdeburg, German Empire
- Died: 24 December 1970 (aged 65) São Paulo, Brazil

Sport
- Sport: Water polo
Medal record
Representing Germany
Olympic Games
Gold medal – first place	1928 Amsterdam	Team competition
Silver medal – second place	1932 Amsterdam	Team competition

Otto Cordes (31 August 1905 – 24 December 1970) was a German water polo player who competed in the 1928 Summer Olympics and in the 1932 Summer Olympics.

In 1928 he was part of the German team which won the gold medal. He played all three matches and scored one goal. Four years later he won the silver medal with the German team. He played all four matches.

In 1968, his son, Burkhard Cordes, won a bronze medal in the 1968 Summer Olympics in sailing - class Flying Dutchman.

== See also ==
- Germany men's Olympic water polo team records and statistics
- List of Olympic champions in men's water polo
- List of Olympic medalists in water polo (men)
