= Austin Clapp =

American swimmer (1910–1971)

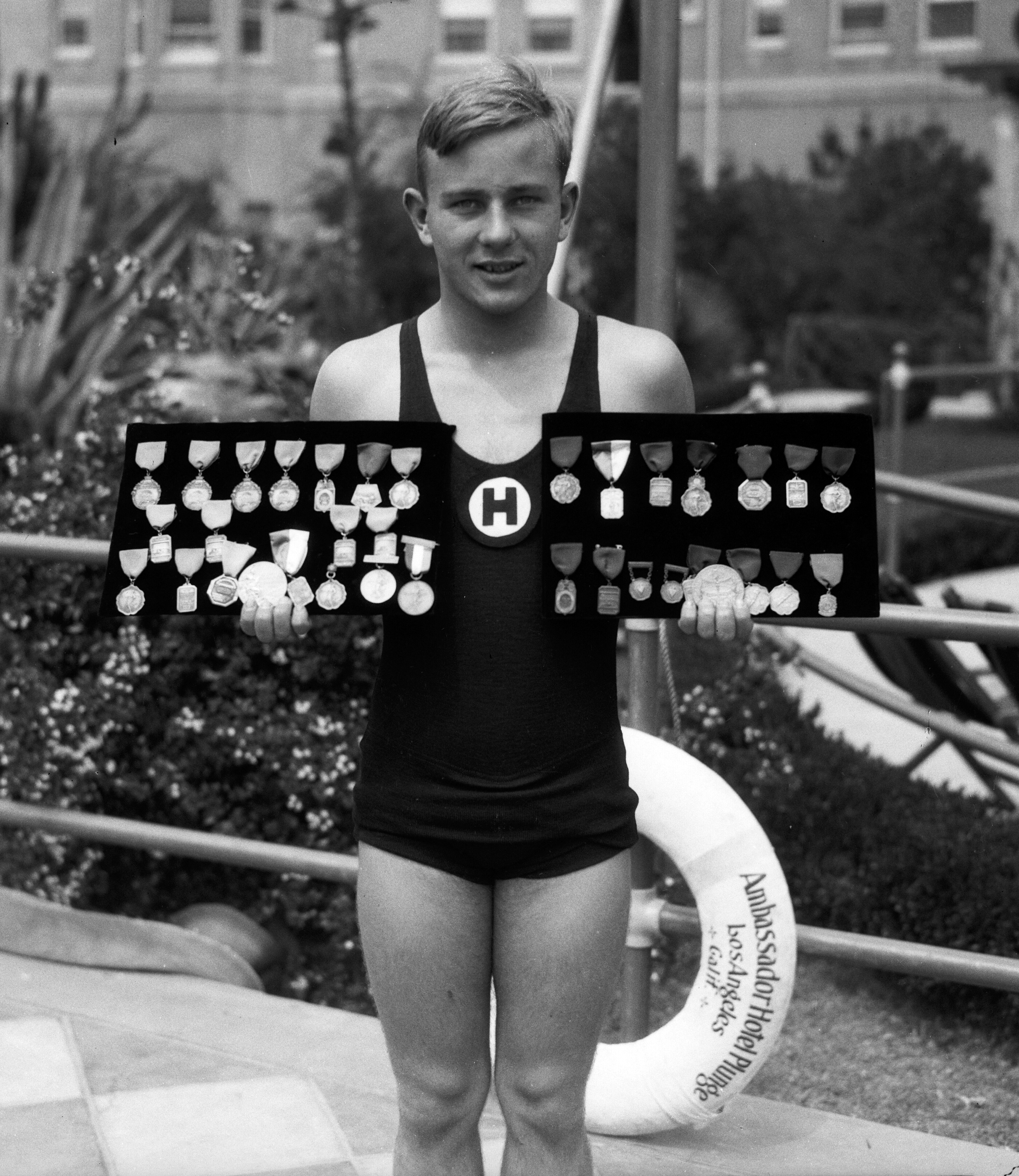
- Clapp around 17 in Hollywood Athletic Club bathing suit circa 1928, showing medal displays

Personal information
- Full name: Austin Rhone Clapp
- National team: United States
- Born: November 8, 1910 Farmington, New Hampshire, U.S.
- Died: December 22, 1971 (aged 61) Woodside, California, U.S.
- Occupations: Lawyer (1936-1970); Goldstein, Barceloux, Goldstein; 1948 US Olympic Coach
- Spouse: Gloria

Sport
- Sport: Swimming
- Strokes: Freestyle, water polo
- Club: Hollywood Athletic Club; Los Angeles Athletic Club (LAAC)
- College team: Stanford University
- Coach: Clyde Swendsen, F. Cady (LAAC); Ernst Brandsten (Stanford)
Medal record
Men's swimming
Representing the United States
Olympic Games
Gold medal – first place	1928 Amsterdam	4x200 m freestyle
Bronze medal – third place	1932 Los Angeles	Water polo

Austin Rhone Clapp (November 8, 1910 – December 22, 1971) was an American competition swimmer and water polo player who competed for Stanford University and represented the United States at both the 1928 Summer Olympics winning a gold medal in the men's 4x200 meter freestyle relay and at the 1932 Summer Olympics where he won a team bronze medal in water polo. After graduating Law School at the UC Berkeley School of Law in 1936, he worked 34 years as an Attorney for the firm of Goldstein, Barceloux, and Goldstein in San Francisco. Remaining active in the water polo community, he coached the U.S. team at the 1948 London Olympics, and served as a collegiate and Amateur Athletic Union water polo coach from 1946-1950.

== Early life ==
Clapp was born November 8, 1910 in Farmington, New Hampshire, and grew up on the small island country of Nauru in the South Pacific, one of three sons of parents who served as medical personnel for the British phosphate mining operations on the island. His father was a Physician. Clapp later attended Hollywood High School in greater Los Angeles, where he competed in water polo and swimming from around 1924-1927.

As a High School Senior representing the Hollywood Athletic Club at the Pacific Coast Championship on September 10, 1927 in Newport, Clapp won the 880-yard freestyle, a distance of around half a mile, in 11:37.2, and the 200-yard medley in 4:30.4, leading his club to a team title. Swimming for the Hollywood Athletic Club in November, 1927, Clapp was an AAU Champion in the 220-yard freestyle with a time of 2:31.

In 1930, Clapp won the annual Golden Gate swim sponsored by the San Francisco Chronicle.

Clapp swam for the Los Angeles Athletic Club in preparation for the 1932 Olympics where he was coached primarily by Clyde Swendsen in water polo and in swimming by Fred Cady.

== Olympics ==
=== 1928 Amsterdam ===
At the 1928 Olympics in Amsterdam, Netherlands, Clapp won a gold medal as a member of the winning U.S. team in the men's 4×200-meter freestyle relay, together with Walter Laufer, George Kojac and Johnny Weissmuller. The Americans set a new world record of 9:36.2 in the relay event. Individually, he placed fifth overall in the men's 400-meter freestyle and also competed in the preliminary heats of the men's 1,500-meter freestyle.

=== 1932 Los Angeles ===
Clapp's Los Angeles Allied Athletic Club defeated the traditionally more dominant Illinois Athletic Club in the water polo finals at the 1932 Olympic Trials in Pasadena on July 22-23. Also selected with Clapp as the first team of seven from the Los Angeles Club to represent the 1932 U.S. Olympic Water Polo team were F. Cal Strong, Philip Daubenspeck, Charles Harold McCallister, Herbert Wildman, and former Olympian Wallace O'Connor. Clapp was one of five water polo players from Stanford on the 1932 Olympic team, including second team and alternates.

At the 1932 Olympics in Los Angeles, California, Clapp was a member of the third-place U.S. water polo team that received the bronze medal. He may have acted in a leadership role on the team, acting on occasion as a player/adviser coach. Hungary took the Gold medal and Germany took the silver. Hungary and Germany were the clear pre-Olympic favorites at the 1932 Olympics, but teams from only five countries participated because of the long boat passage to Los Angeles from Europe. On August 6, the U.S. water polo team began their Olympic journey with an important 6–1 victory over the team from Brazil, and then on August 7, won a commanding 10–0 victory over the team from Japan. On August 9, the U.S. team consequently tied the very strong team from Germany by a score of 4–4, but on August 11, lost 7–1 to the dominant team from Hungary. Clapp participated in all four matches.

Having tied with the team from Germany on points scored, the U.S. received the bronze medal due to goal difference. The bronze was one of the U.S. team's few Olympic medals in water polo before a predominantly U.S. crowd, and helped give greater visibility to the sport among American audiences.

=== Stanford University ===
Graduating in 1932, Clapp attended Stanford University, under Coach Ernst Brandsten, where he was a member of the Stanford Cardinal swimming and water polo teams in National Collegiate Athletic Association (NCAA) competition from around 1928-1931. As a college swimmer, he won two NCAA national championships: the 1931 title in the 220-yard freestyle (2:18.0), and the 1932 title in the 1,500-meter freestyle (20:02.2). Clapp's team at Stanford won the PAC Conference Championships in both 1929 and 1931, and in 1931, he was an All Pacific Conference (PAC) honoree. After completing his undergraduate degree at Stanford in Political Science in 1932, he graduated Boalt Law school at the UC Berkeley School of Law in 1936.

=== Careers ===
After graduating Law School at Berkeley in 1936, Clapp had a career of thirty-four years with the San Francisco firm of Goldstein, Barceloux, and Goldstein. Staying active in the water polo community, he coached the U.S. water polo team in London at the 1948 Olympics, and was active as a water polo coach for both AAU and collegiate competition from 1946-1950.

Having worked nearly his entire life, Clapp died on December 22, 1971 at the age of 61 in Woodside, California after a lengthy illness. He had lived in Woodside for seventeen years where for some of that time he helped operate the Searsville Lake Park, which included a swimming facility that had been used by Stanford. After services at the Chapel of Roller and Hapgood in Palo Alto, he was buried at Alta Mesa Cemetery. He was survived by his wife Gloria Clapp, two sons, and a brother.

=== Honors ===
For his achievements as a medalist, coach and referee in Olympic, and collegiate swimming and water polo, in 1976 he was inducted into the USA Water Polo Hall of Fame. He was formerly an inductee to the Stanford Athletic Hall of Fame and the Helms Athletic Hall of Fame in Los Angeles.

== See also ==
- List of athletes with Olympic medals in different disciplines
- List of Olympic medalists in swimming (men)
- List of Olympic medalists in water polo (men)
- List of Stanford University people
- World record progression 4 × 200 metres freestyle relay
