= Water polo at the 1932 Summer Olympics =

Men's water polo at the Games of the X Olympiad
- Venue: Los Angeles
- Dates: 4–13 August
- Competitors: 41 from 5 nations

Medalists
| 1st place, gold medalist(s) | | Hungary; Hungary |
| 2nd place, silver medalist(s) | | Germany; Germany |
| 3rd place, bronze medalist(s) | | United States; United States |

Final results for the water polo tournament at the 1932 Summer Olympics:

== Medal summary ==
| Gold | Silver | Bronze |
|---|---|---|
| Hungary; István Barta; György Bródy; Olivér Halassy; Márton Homonnai; Sándor Ivády; Alajos Keserű; Ferenc Keserű; János Németh; Miklós Sárkány; József Vértesy | Germany; Emil Benecke; Otto Cordes; Hans Eckstein; Fritz Gunst; Erich Rademacher; Joachim Rademacher; Hans Schulze; Heiko Schwartz | United States; Austin Clapp; Philip Daubenspeck; Charles Finn; Charles McCallister; Wally O'Connor; Cal Strong; Herbert Wildman; Tex Robertson |

== Results ==
- 6 August

| Hungary | 6 – 2 | Germany |

- 7 August

| United States | 10 – 0 | Japan |

- 8 August

| Hungary | 18 – 0 | Japan |

- 9 August

| United States | 4 – 4 | Germany |

- 11 August

| Hungary | 7 – 0 | United States |

- 12 August

| Germany | 10 – 0 | Japan |

=== Annulled matches ===
- 4 August

| Germany | 7 – 3 | Brazil |

- 6 August

| United States | 6 – 1 | Brazil |

=== Final standings ===
| Pos | Team | Pld | W | D | L | GF | GA | GD | Pts | HUN | GER | USA | JPN | BRA |
|---|---|---|---|---|---|---|---|---|---|---|---|---|---|---|
| 1st place, gold medalist(s) | Hungary | 3 | 3 | 0 | 0 | 31 | 2 | +29 | 6 | | 6–2 | 7–0 | 18–0 | n/p |
| 2nd place, silver medalist(s) | Germany | 3 | 1 | 1 | 1 | 16 | 10 | +6 | 3 | 2–6 | | 4–4 | 10–0 | ~~7–3~~ |
| 3rd place, bronze medalist(s) | United States | 3 | 1 | 1 | 1 | 14 | 11 | +3 | 3 | 0–7 | 4–4 | | 10–0 | ~~6–1~~ |
| 4 | Japan | 3 | 0 | 0 | 3 | 0 | 38 | −38 | 0 | 0–18 | 0–10 | 0–10 | | n/p |
| DSQ | Brazil | 0 | 0 | 0 | 0 | 0 | 0 | 0 | 0 (Note: Brazil were ejected from the competition after their players assaulted referee Bela Komjadi and other officials following the end of their match against Germany, resulting in the entire team being arrested. Their two matches were annulled.) | n/p | ~~3–7~~ | ~~1–6~~ | n/p | |

Source: sports-reference

== Participating nations ==
Each country was allowed to enter a team of 11 players and all were eligible for participation.

A total of 41(*) water polo players from five nations competed at the Los Angeles Games:

- Brazil (8)
- Germany (8)
- Hungary (10)
- Japan (8)
- United States (7)

(*) NOTE: Only those players are counted, who participated in one game at least.

Not all reserve players are known.

== Summary ==
| Place | Nation |
|---|---|
| 1 | Hungary |
| | István Barta (III. ker. TVE); György Bródy (FTC); Olivér Halassy (UTE); Márton Homonnai (UTE); Sándor Ivády (MAC); Alajos Keserű (FTC); Ferenc Keserű (III. ker. TVE); János Németh (UTE); Miklós Sárkány (UTE); József Vértesy (BSE) |
| 2 | Germany |
| | Emil Benecke (Hellas Magdeburg); Otto Cordes (Hellas Magdeburg); Hans Eckstein (Poseidon Leipzig); Fritz Gunst (Wasserfreunde 98 Hannover); Erich Rademacher (Hellas Magdeburg); Joachim Rademacher (Hellas Magdeburg); Hans Schulze; Heiko Schwartz Gerd Pohl; Hans Schwartz; Albert Schumberg |
| 3 | United States |
| | Coach: Frank Rivas (Venice Swimming Association); Austin Clapp (Los Angeles Athletic Club); Philip Daubenspeck (Los Angeles Athletic Club); Charles Finn (Los Angeles Athletic Club); Charles McCallister (Los Angeles Athletic Club); Wally O'Connor (Los Angeles Athletic Club); Cal Strong (Los Angeles Athletic Club); Herbert Wildman (Los Angeles Athletic Club) Frank C. Graham (Los Angeles Athletic Club); Fred Lauer (Illinois Athletic Club); William O'Connor (Los Angeles Athletic Club); Raymond Ruddy (New York Athletic Club); Tex Robertson; Duke Kahanamoku alternate |
| 4 | Japan Shuji Doi; Akira Fujita; Seibei Kimura; Takashige Matsumoto; Yasutarō Sakagami; Tosuke Sawami; Takaji Takebayashi; Iwao Tokito |
| DSQ | Brazil Salvador Amendola; Carlos Branco; Luiz da Silva; Mario de Lorenzo; Antônio Jacobina Filho; Jefferson Souza; Adhemar Serpa; Pedro Theberge |

== Sources ==
- PDF documents in the LA84 Foundation Digital Library:
  - Official Report of the 1932 Olympic Games (download, archive) (pp. 619–623, 646–652)
- Water polo on the Olympedia website
  - Water polo at the 1932 Summer Olympics (men's tournament)
- Water polo on the Sports Reference website
  - Water polo at the 1932 Summer Games (men's tournament) (archived)
