= Hans Schulze =

German water polo player

Personal information
- Born: 25 August 1911 Magdeburg, German Empire
- Died: 26 January 1992 (aged 80) Wuppertal, Germany

Sport
- Sport: Water polo
Medal record
Representing Germany
Olympic Games
Silver medal – second place	1932 Los Angeles	Team competition
Silver medal – second place	1936 Berlin	Team competition

Hans Schulze (25 August 1911 – 26 January 1992) was a German water polo player who competed in the 1932 Summer Olympics and in the 1936 Summer Olympics.

In 1932 he was part of the German team which won the silver medal. He played all four matches.

Four years later he won his second silver medal with the German team in Berlin. He played all seven matches.

== See also ==
- List of Olympic medalists in water polo (men)
