= Donald Good =

British judge (1907–1993)

Tan Sri Donald Good CMG JMN PSM
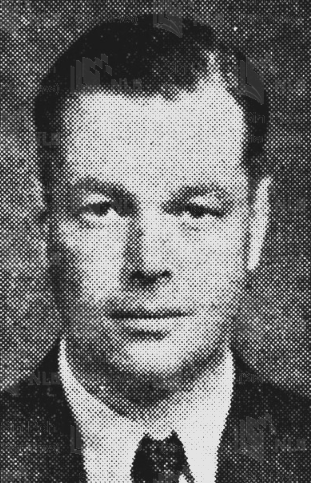
- Good c. 1950

Judge of the Court of Appeal of the Federation of Malaya
- In office 1959–1962

Judge of the Supreme Court of the Federation of Malaya
- In office 1955–1959

Personal details
- Born: 13 April 1907 Ireland
- Died: 19 October 1993 (aged 86)
- Children: 2
- Education: Trinity College, Dublin
- Profession: Barrister and colonial judge

Donald Bernard Waters Good (13 April 1907 – 19 October 1993) was a British barrister and colonial judge.

== Early life and education ==
Good was born on 13 July 1907 in Ireland to William John and Kathleen Mary Good. He was educated at The High School, Dublin and Trinity College, Dublin. He was called to the Bar by King's Inns, Dublin in 1935 and by Gray's Inn in 1948.

== Career ==
Good began his career as a teacher after graduating having been appointed assistant master (general subjects) in the Education Department of the Straits Settlements and the Federated Malay States in 1930. He taught in Singapore, and in 1931, was seconded for service as a master in the Johore Education Department.

Good went to Kenya in 1940 after qualifying as a barrister where he was a magistrate until 1945. He then returned to Malaya, and worked in the government planning department before he was appointed a crown counsel of the Malayan Union in 1946 and served as Deputy Public Prosecutor. From 1948 until 1949, he was legal adviser in Negeri Sembilan and in Malacca. From 1949 to 1950, he was state legal adviser in Johore and federal counsel, and served on the committee of review under the Emergency Regulations.

After spending two years as a legal draftsman in Sierra Leone between 1951 and 1952, Good returned to the Federation of Malaya where he was senior federal counsel from 1952 to 1955 in the Attorney-General's Department. He also served as acting judge of the Supreme Court in Kuala Lumpur, and as acting solicitor-general of the Federation of Malaya in 1953 and 1955. From 1955 to 1959, he served as judge of the Supreme Court of the Federation of Malaya, and then from 1959 to 1962 as judge of the Court of Appeal.

Good served as chairman of various commissions. He was president of the Industrial Court from 1956 to 1957 and chairman of the detained persons advisory board. He retired in 1963 under the Malayanisation scheme.

After retiring, Good served for many years as a Commissioner of Law Revision, Malaysia.

== Personal life and death ==
Good married Kathryn Stanley in 1930 and they had a son and a daughter.

Good died on 19 October 1993, aged 86.

== Honours ==
Good was appointed Companion of the Order of St Michael and St George (CMG) in the 1962 Birthday Honours. He was appointed Companion of the Order of the Defender of the Realm (JMN) (Hon) in 1965 and Commander in the Order of Loyalty to the Crown of Malaysia (PSM) (Hon) in 1970.
