= Iwao Tokito =

Japanese water polo player

Personal information
- Nationality: Japanese
- Born: 1908 Hokkaido, Japan

Sport
- Sport: Water polo

Iwao Tokito (時任巌, Tokio Iwao; born 1908, date of death unknown) was a Japanese water polo player. He competed in the men's tournament at the 1932 Summer Olympics.
