= Sándor Ivády =

Hungarian water polo player (1903–1998)

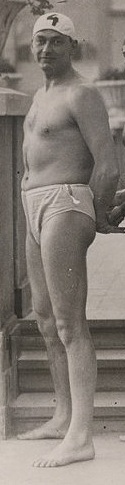

Personal information
- Born: 1 May 1903 Budapest, Austria-Hungary
- Died: 21 December 1998 (aged 95) Vienna, Austria

Sport
- Sport: Water polo
Medal record
Representing Hungary
Olympic Games
Gold medal – first place	1932 Los Angeles	Team competition
Silver medal – second place	1928 Amsterdam	Team competition

Sándor Ivády (1 May 1903 – 21 December 1998) was a Hungarian water polo player who competed in the 1928 Summer Olympics and in the 1932 Summer Olympics.

In 1928, he was part of the Hungarian water polo team which won the silver medal. He played all four matches.

Four years later he won the gold medal with the Hungarian team. He played all three matches.

His father was Béla Ivády, a Hungarian politician and agriculture minister between 1931 and 1932.

== See also ==
- Hungary men's Olympic water polo team records and statistics
- List of Olympic champions in men's water polo
- List of Olympic medalists in water polo (men)
