= Emil Purgly =

Hungarian politician (1880–1964)

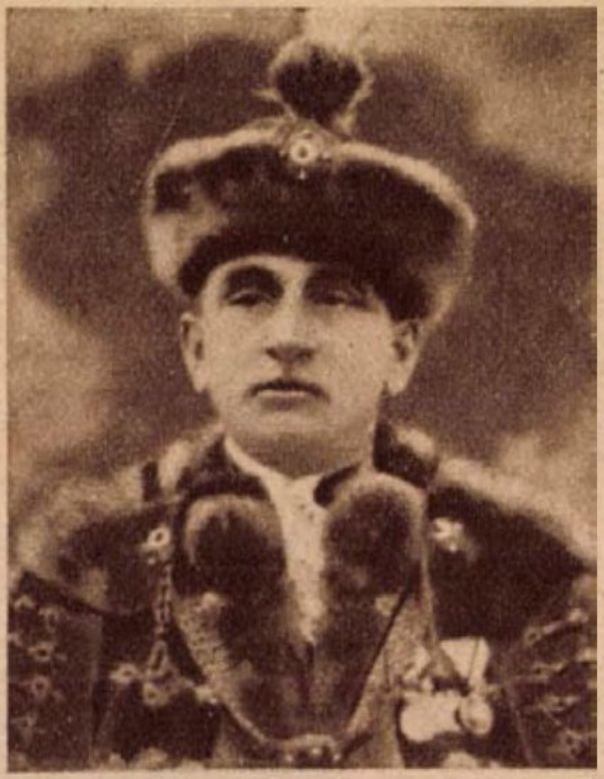

Minister of Agriculture of Hungary
- In office 4 February 1932 – 1 October 1932
- Preceded by: Béla Ivády
- Succeeded by: Miklós Kállay

Personal details
- Born: 19 February 1880 Tompapuszta, Kingdom of Hungary, Austria-Hungary
- Died: 13 May 1964 (aged 84) Budapest, People's Republic of Hungary
- Political party: Unity Party
- Profession: politician

Emil Purgly de Jószáshely (19 February 1880 – 13 May 1964) was a Hungarian politician, who served as Minister of Agriculture in 1932.

He was a cousin of Magdolna Purgly, wife of Regent Miklós Horthy.

Political offices
Preceded by Béla Ivády	Minister of Agriculture; 1932	Succeeded by Miklós Kállay
