= Hole set =

Position in water polo

Hole Set position in water polo pool

Hole set is an offensive position in the game of water polo. It can be referred to as just the "set” position Because this player is typically positioned on the two meter (2M) marker and in center of the opposing team's goal, the position can also be called the two-meter or simply 2M. Other names for this position include center forward, due to the similarity between the corresponding basketball position, as well as the pit-man. The defensive player guarding the hole set can be called the hole-D, where D stands for defense, two-meter defender, or 2M-D.
