= Ernst Brandsten =

Swedish diver (1883–1965)

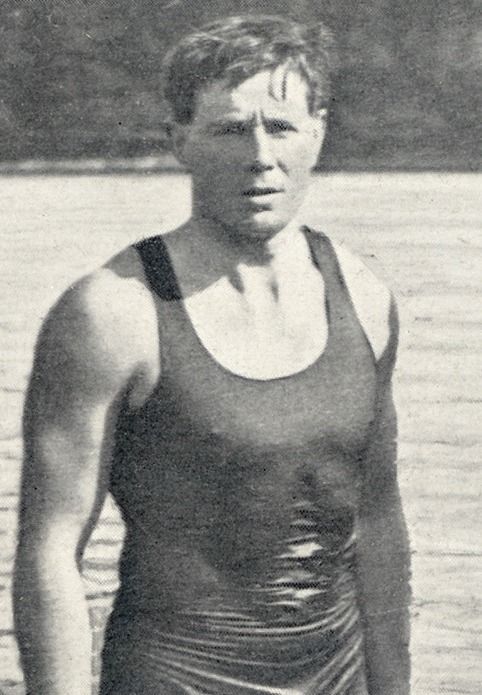
- Brandsten in swimsuit as 1912 Olympian for Sweden

Personal information
- Nationality: Swedish American
- Born: 13 June 1883 Karlskoga, Sweden
- Died: 17 May 1965 (aged 81) Santa Clara, California, United States
- Occupation(s): Swimming, Diving, Water Polo Coach; Stanford U. Coach (1916-1947); Head U.S. Olympic Diving Coach (1928, 1932)
- Height: 170 cm (5 ft 7 in)
- Spouse: Greta Johansson

Sport
- Sport: Diving
- Club: SK Neptun, Stockholm

Ernst Magnus Brandsten (born Andersson; 13 June 1883 – 17 May 1965) was a Swedish diver who competed in the 1912 Summer Olympics for Sweden in springboard, platform, and high diving. After immigrating to the U.S. around 1913, he was the swimming, water polo, and diving coach for Stanford University from 1916 to 1947 and served as the U.S. Head Olympic Diving Coach for the 1928 and 1932 Olympics.

== Biography ==
Brandsten was born on 13 June 1883 in Karlskoga, Sweden, to merchant Carl Magnus Andersson and Maria Pettersson. The family soon moved to Stockholm. In the early 1900s, he went to the United States where he inititally worked as a sailor mapping the coast of Alaska. He later worked in diving shows, jumping from high heights.

After returning to his homeland of Sweden, he won the Swedish championship in combined diving in 1912.

=== 1912 Olympics ===
He competed in 3 m springboard, 10 m platform and plain high diving at the 1912 Summer Olympics and finished seventh in the last event.

=== Coaching ===
After the 1912 Olympics where he represented Sweden, Brandsten immigrated to the United States in 1913, where he married the Swedish diver Greta Johansson, who also competed at the 1912 Olympics. The couple trained divers, swimmers, and water polo players at Stanford University from 1916 to 1947 and operated the sports recreation facility, Searsville Lake Park. Brandsten was a U.S. Olympic diving coach four times. During his time as a U.S. Olympic coach in 1924, 1928, 1932, and 1936, his American divers captured 42 of 51 men's and women's diving medals. His Stanford athletes, consisting of both divers and swimmers, won nine Olympic gold medals. Outside of Olympic competition, his divers won 25 Amateur Athletic Union national championships.

Ernst and Greta Brandsten's trainees dominated international diving competitions, especially at the 1924 and 1928 Olympics.

Brandsten died at 81, on May 17, 1965 in Santa Clara, California.

=== Honors ===
Ernst and Greta were both inducted into the International Swimming Hall of Fame: Brandsten as a swimming and diving coach in 1966, and Johansson as a diver in 1973.

== See also ==
- List of members of the International Swimming Hall of Fame
