= Clyde Swendsen =

American diver and coach

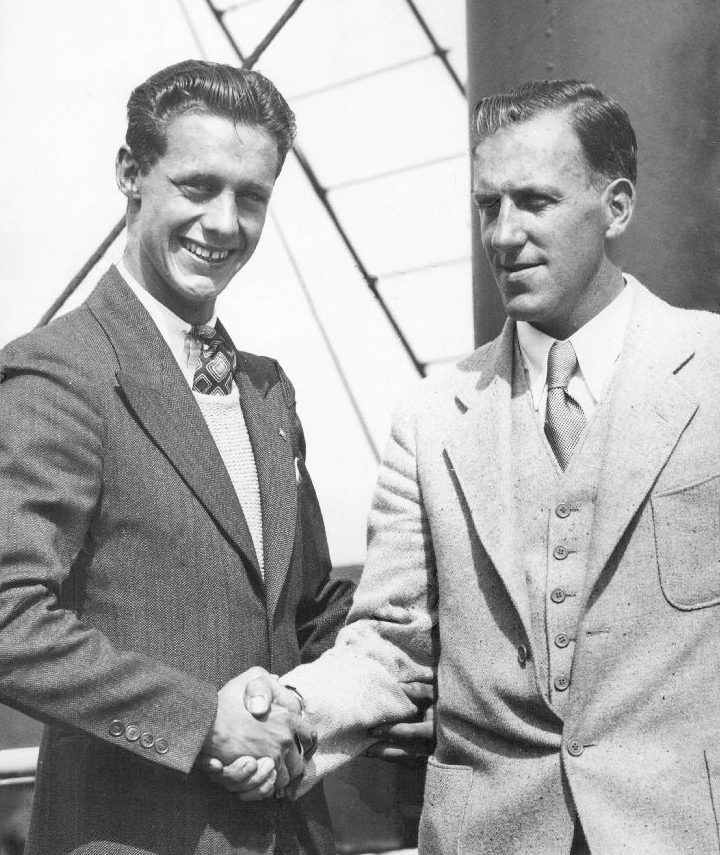
- Kurtz and Swendsen (right) in 1931

Personal information
- Full name: Clyde Acle Swendsen
- Born: May 25, 1895 Port Townsend, Washington, U.S.
- Died: December 1, 1979 (aged 84) Ventura, California, U.S.
- Height: 170 cm (5 ft 7 in)

Sport
- Sport: Diving
- Club: Los Angeles Athletic Club

Clyde Acle Swendsen (May 25, 1895 – December 1, 1979) was an American diver, water polo player and coach. He won the AAU titles in the 10 m platform in 1918 and the springboard in 1919–20 and competed at the 1920 Summer Olympics. After the Olympics, he had a long career as a diving, swimming and water polo coach. He trained 17 Olympians including Frank Kurtz, Vicki Draves, Elizabeth Becker-Pinkston, Dorothy Poynton-Hill, Harold Smith, Buster Crabbe and Johnny Weissmuller.

Swendsen was born in Washington state but lived most of his life in Los Angeles. He took up diving in 1914 and also played water polo, becoming a member of the national team in 1920. After that, he coached for 14 years at the Los Angeles Athletic Club and the Hollywood Athletic Club and for five years each at University of California, Los Angeles and Hollywood High School. Between 1947 and 1950, he trained the national team of Guatemala. In 1980, he was inducted into the USA Water Polo Hall of Fame. In 1991 he was inducted into the International Swimming Hall of Fame.

== See also ==
- List of members of the International Swimming Hall of Fame
