= UC Irvine Anteaters =

Sports teams of the University of California, Irvine

- University: University of California, Irvine
- Nickname: Anteaters
- NCAA: Division I
- Conference: Big West (primary); Mountain Pacific Sports Federation (women's indoor track & field)
- Athletic director: Paula Smith
- Location: Irvine, California
- First year: 1965
- Varsity teams: 18 (9 men's, 9 women's)
- Basketball arena: Bren Events Center
- Baseball stadium: Anteater Ballpark
- Soccer stadium: Anteater Stadium
- Other venues: Anteater Aquatics Complex; Big Canyon Country Club; Crawford Hall; Dove Canyon Country Club; Microsemi Field; UC Irvine Tennis Stadium
- Colors: Blue and gold
- Mascot: Peter the Anteater
- Fight song: "Anteaters, Go!" and "The Big C"
- Website: ucirvinesports.com

Team NCAA championships
- 7

Individual and relay NCAA champions
- 3

The UC Irvine Anteaters are the athletic teams fielded by the University of California, Irvine (UC Irvine). Its athletics programs participate in the NCAA's Division I, as members of the Big West Conference and the Mountain Pacific Sports Federation. For earlier years of the school's existence, the teams participated at the Division II level with great success as explained below.

UC Irvine fields teams in men's baseball, men's and women's basketball, men's and women's cross country running, men's and women's golf, men's and women's soccer, men's and women's tennis, women's indoor track & field, men's and women's outdoor track & field, men's and women's volleyball, and men's and women's water polo. The Anteaters have won 28 national championships in nine different team sports. 64 Anteaters have won individual national championships, and 53 Anteaters have competed in the Olympics. In the 2006-07 season, the Anteaters won the DI-AAA ADA All-Sports Trophy, the trophy for the best non-football university athletic program. They are one of four schools to ever win the award, along with Pepperdine, the University of Denver, and conference rival UC Santa Barbara.

== Conference affiliations ==
- 1965–66 to 1976–77 – NCAA Division II Independent
- 1977–78 to present – Big West Conference

== Sports sponsored ==
Men's sports	Women's sports
Baseball	Basketball
Basketball	Cross country
Cross country	Golf
Golf	Soccer
Soccer	Tennis
Tennis	Track and field
Track and field^{1}	Volleyball
Volleyball	Water polo
Water Polo	
^{1} – outdoor only

=== Baseball ===
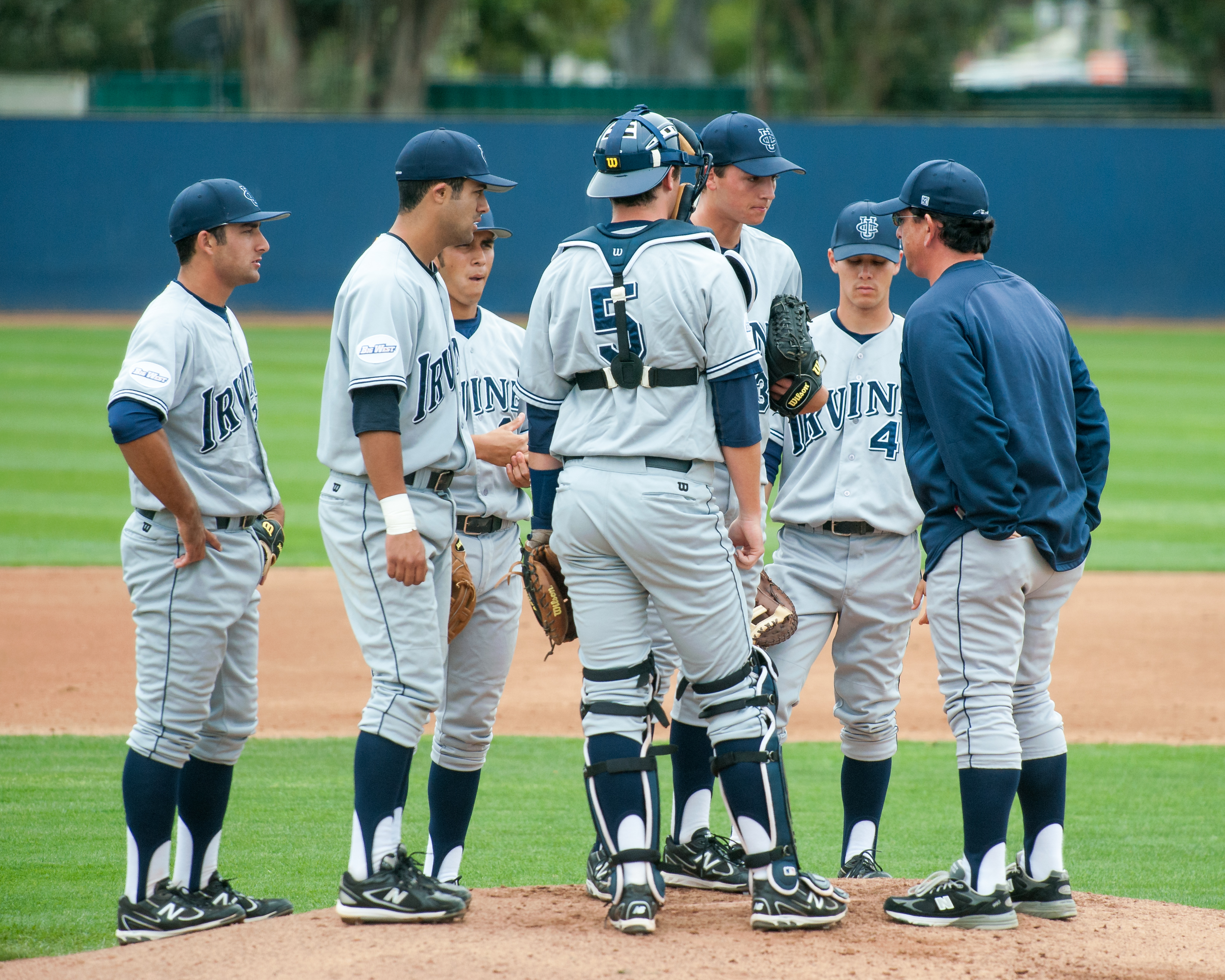
UC Irvine team in 2010

UC Irvine's baseball team won two national championships at the College Division and the Division II level in 1973 and 1974, prior to moving to Division I. The program was eliminated in 1992 due to state budget cuts, but was reinstated in 2002.

Since the return of its baseball program in 2002, UCI has been ranked as high as No. 1 in the country. In 2007, UCI participated in the College World Series for the first time in school history. The Anteaters eliminated both Cal State Fullerton and Arizona State before losing to Oregon State, earning a 3rd-place finish. In 2014, the Anteaters returned to the College World Series and earned a 5th-place finish.

=== Basketball ===
During the 1982 season the men's basketball team were led by two-time first team All-American Kevin Magee. That season, the team was ranked as high as No. 19 in the nation for NCAA Division I basketball. During the 1986 season the Anteaters were led by future NBA player and former head coach of the Washington Wizards, Scott Brooks.

The Anteaters hired Golden State Warriors assistant Russell Turner as the head men's basketball coach in 2010. Turner was named Big West Conference Coach of the Year after he led the Anteaters to the 2013-2014 conference regular season championship.

The Anteaters won their first ever NCAA tournament game in school history on March 22, 2019, upsetting No. 4 Kansas State Wildcats 70-64.

=== Cross country ===
The UC Irvine Anteaters men's cross country team appeared in the NCAA Tournament three times, with their highest finish being 11th place in the 1986–87 school year. The UC Irvine Anteaters women's cross country team appeared in the NCAA Tournament four times, with their highest finish being 4th place in the 1990–91 school year.

Big West logo in UCI's colors

Year	Gender	Ranking	Points
1977	Men	No. 15	376
1983	Women	No. 16	390
1986	Men	No. 11	281
1987	Men	No. 14	323
1987	Women	No. 8	213
1989	Women	No. 10	279
1990	Women	No. 4	210

=== Golf ===
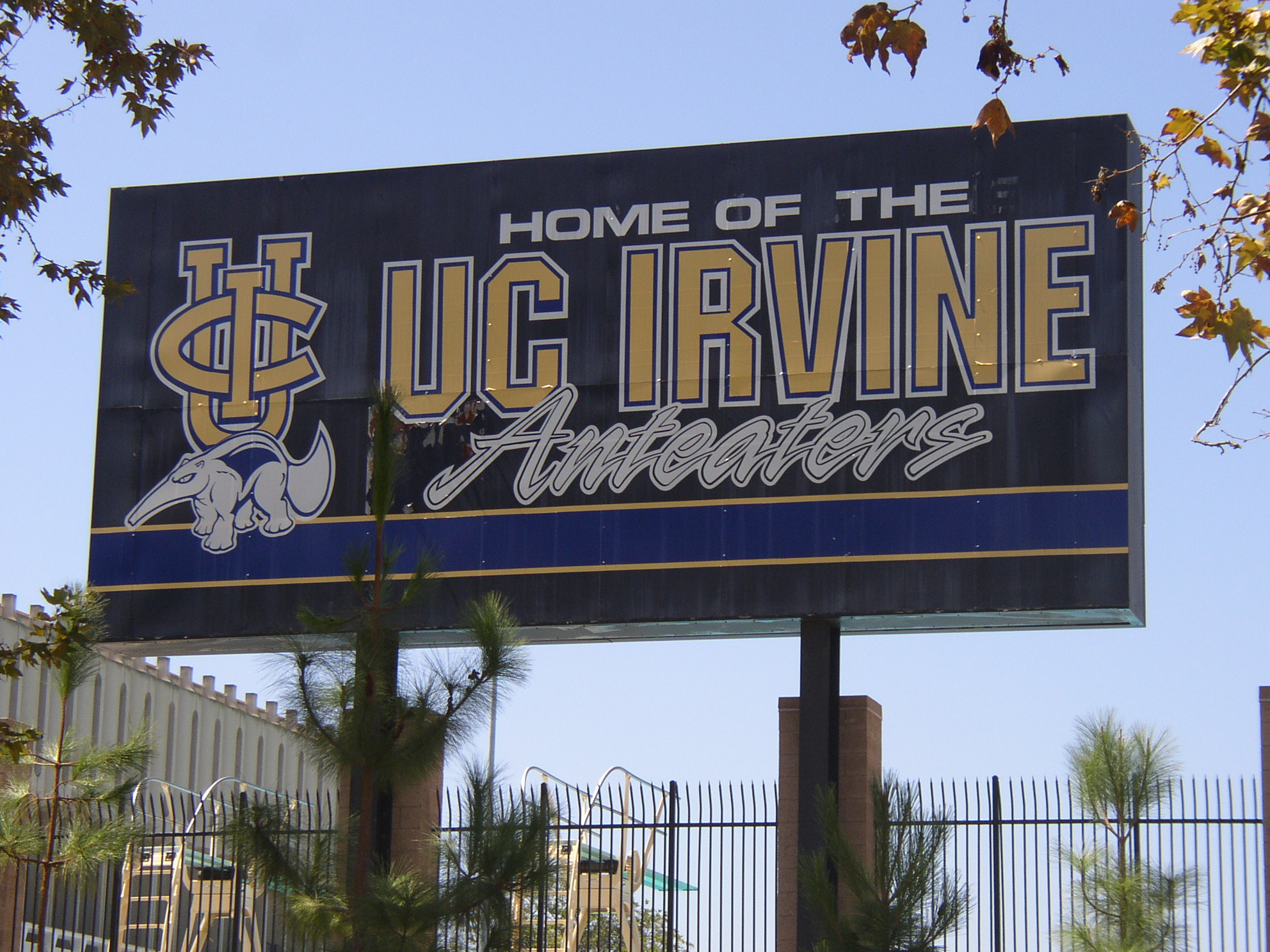
UCI sign at Crawford Hall – the athletic complex

During the early years when the UC Irvine Anteater men's golf team participated at the Division II level, the teams were highly successful for five consecutive years from 1973 through 1977. Coach Jerry Hulbert formed teams consisting of local southern California players. The teams played in the NCAA Division II team national championship for each of these five years, including winning the national team championship in 1975. Anteater team member Jerry Wisz also won the individual national championship that year. At these national championships, the teams finished fourth in 1973, second in 1974, second in 1976, and thirteenth in 1977. Seven players from the 1972 through 1976 teams earned All-American honors awarded by the Golf Coaches Association of America, with two of these players awarded for two consecutive years. After reaching the Division I level, the Anteater teams have played in the NCAA National Regionals fourteen times, including reaching the national championship three of those seasons. In coach Paul Smolinski's quite successful twenty-three years as head coach, his teams have played in twelve NCAA regionals, and two NCAA national championships (2001 & 2008). Arguably his best player John Chin, who along with the above-mentioned Jerry Wisz have been the two best players in the entire school history, earned NCAA Division I All-American honors in 2010. John has played as a member of the PGA Tour and what is currently named the Korn Ferry Tour.

=== Soccer ===
UCI soccer plays its home games at Anteater Stadium. The men's team has been ranked as high as No. 3 in the nation and has made six Division I NCAA tournament appearances with berths in 2008, 2009, 2011, 2013, 2014, and 2018. In addition, since the introduction of the Big West Conference Tournament for soccer in 2008 the Anteaters have won the tournament championship four times. The women's team has made two Division I NCAA tournament appearances with berths in 2010 and 2011.

Notable Anteater soccer alumni include United States men's national team member Brad Evans (Seattle Sounders FC), Miguel Ibarra (Minnesota United FC) and Rouzy (LA Galaxy).

The UC Irvine Anteaters men's soccer team have an NCAA Division I Tournament record of 6–6 through six appearances.

Year	Round	Opponent	Result
2008	Second Round; Third Round	Cal Poly; St. John's	W 3–0; L 2–3
2009	Second Round	Stanford	L 0–1
2011	Second Round	Saint Mary's	L 1–2
2013	Second Round; Third Round	North Carolina; Maryland	W 1–0; L 0–1
2014	First Round; Second Round; Third Round	UNLV; Stanford; Providence	W 3–0; W 1–0; L 0–1
2018	First Round; Second Round	Grand Canyon; Stanford	W 2–1; L 0–2
2023	First Round	Loyola Marmount	L 2–4
2025	First Round	Denver	L 0–2

The UC Irvine Anteaters women's soccer team have an NCAA Division I Tournament record of 6–5–1 through five appearances.

Year	Round	Opponent	Result
2010	First Round; Second Round; Third Round	Arizona State; Wake Forest; Washington	W 2–1; W 2–0; L 0–1
2011	First Round	San Diego	D 2–2 (PK 3-5)
2021	First Round; Second Round	UCLA; Wisconsin	W 1-0; L 0-3
2022	First Round; Second Round; Third Round	USC; Brown; No. 1 Alabama	W 2-0; D 1-1 (PK 4-2); L 1-3
2023	First Round; Second Round; Third Round	No. 2 UCLA; Gonzaga; Nebraska	W 1-0; W 2-1; L 0-4

=== Men's Volleyball ===
UC Irvine men's volleyball have made the NCAA Tournament a total of eight times, winning four National Championships (2007, 2009, 2012, 2013). As of 2024, the Anteaters hold a record of 9–4 (.692) in those eight NCAA Tournament appearances.

The Anteaters made their first final four appearance in 2006, losing in the NCAA semi-finals to Penn State. They won their first national championship in 2007 by defeating IPFW 3–1 in the NCAA final. UCI won its second national championship in 2009 after defeating USC 3-2 in a five-set comeback victory in the NCAA final. The Anteaters won their third NCAA men's volleyball title in 2012 after defeating USC again in the NCAA final, this time in a 3-0 sweep at the Galen Center. UCI's longtime head coach John Speraw had guided the Anteaters to three national championships in six years but immediately after winning the 2012 national title he left UCI after accepting the head coaching position at UCLA.

UC Irvine alum and former assistant coach David Kniffin took over the Anteater program in 2013 and became just the second head coach in NCAA men's volleyball history to win a national championship in his first season. In the 2013 NCAA final the Anteaters defeated BYU in a 3-0 sweep to win back-to-back national championships.

Year	Round	Opponent	Result
2006	Semifinal	Penn State	L 2–3
2007	Semifinal; Championship	Penn State; IPFW	W 3–1; W 3–1
2009	Semifinal; Championship	Ohio State; USC	W 3–0; W 3–2
2012	Semifinal; Championship	Penn State; USC	W 3–1; W 3–0
2013	Semifinal; Championship	Loyola (Chicago); BYU	W 3–0; W 3–0
2015	Semifinal	Loyola (Chicago)	L 0–3
2018	Quarterfinal	Ohio State	L 0–3
2024	Quarterfinal; Semifinal	Penn State; UCLA	W 3–0; L 2–3
2026	Regional Round; Regional Final; Semifinal; Championship	Penn State; UCLA; Ball State; Hawai'i	W 3–2; W 3–2; W 3–1; L 1–3

=== Women's Volleyball ===
The UC Irvine Anteaters women's volleyball team have an NCAA Division I Tournament record of 1–3 through three appearances.

Year	Round	Opponent	Result
1988	First Round	Long Beach State	L 2–3
2003	First Round; Second Round	Missouri; UCLA	W 3–2; L 0–3
2004	First Round	Arizona	L 0–3

=== Water polo ===
==== Men's ====
UC Irvine's men's water polo team won three NCAA Division I national championships in 1970, 1982, and 1989.

UCI's head men's water polo coach for many years was Ted Newland. As the Anteaters' head coach from 1966-2005, Newland had a lifetime record of 714–345–5. In his 39 years at the helm the Anteaters won three national championships, and the team was consistently rated among the nation's top 5 programs. Many world-class water polo players have been affiliated with UCI, with more than 70 NCAA All-Americans and 13 Olympians being produced by the program. Four Anteaters were a part of the United States team that won the silver medal at the 2008 Olympics in Beijing.

The UC Irvine Anteaters men's water polo team have an NCAA Division I Tournament record of 29–19 through twenty-two appearances.

In 2023, the UC Irvine Anteaters men's water polo team won the inaugural Big West Men's Water Polo Tournament. With Cal State Fullerton’s addition of a men’s water polo program, the Big West met the criteria to create a men’s water polo conference with its six participating institutions and will now have the ability to have its own championship. The winner receives an automatic berth to the NCAA Men's Water Polo Championship.

==== Women's ====
The UC Irvine women's water polo team is coached by 2004 Olympian Dan Klatt since 2005 and has led the team to 8 NCAA Tournament Appearances in 2011, 2012, 2014, 2015, 2017, 2018, 2022, and 2023, finishing as high as 4th place in 2012. In addition, the team has won 9 Big West Titles and 9 Big West Tournament Titles under Klatt.

=== Men's Water Polo history ===
Year	Round	Opponent	Result
1969	First Round	California	L 4–5
1970	First Round; Semifinals; National Championship	USC; Long Beach State; UCLA	W 7–4; W 9–6; W 7–6
1971	First Round	CSU Fullerton	L 4–5
1972	First Round; Semifinals	UC Santa Barbara; UCLA	W 16–12; L 10–15
1973	First Round; Semifinals; National Championship	Long Beach State; USC; California	W 7–5; W 9–5; L 4–8
1974	First Round; Semifinals; National Championship	UC Santa Barbara; UCLA; California	W 10–6; W 5–3; L 6–7
1975	First Round; Semifinals; National Championship	UC Davis; Stanford; California	W 19–4; W 9–8; L 8–9
1976	First Round; Semifinals	Pittsburgh; UCLA	W 18–4; L 9–14
1977	First Round; Semifinals; National Championship	Arizona; Stanford; California	W 14–7; W 9–7; L 6–8
1978	First Round; Semifinals	Loyola (IL); California	W 14–5; L 5–7
1980	First Round; Semifinals	Bucknell; California	W 13–4; L 7–9
1981	First Round; Semifinals	UC Santa Barbara; Stanford	W 9–8; L 6–13
1982	First Round; Semifinals; National Championship	Brown; California; Stanford	W 13–2; W 8–5; W 7–4
1983	First Round; Semifinals	Loyola (IL); USC	W 12–8; L 8–9
1985	First Round; Semifinals; National Championship	Brown; UCLA; Stanford	W 15–8; W 7–6; L 11–12
1987	First Round; Semifinals	Stanford; California	W 8–6; L 3–7
1988	First Round	USC	L 11–13
1989	First Round; Semifinals; National Championship	UALR; Stanford; California	W 13–6; W 8–7; W 9–8
1991	First Round; Semifinals	Long Beach State; California	W 11–8; L 10–13
1992	First Round; Semifinals	Pepperdine; California	W 11–8; L 5–8
1993	First Round; Semifinals	Pacific; Stanford	W 12–10; L 8–10
2023	First Round	Princeton	L 7-12

== Championships ==
=== Appearances ===
The UC Irvine Anteaters competed in the NCAA Tournament across 18 active sports (10 men's and 8 women's) 110 times at the Division I level.

- Baseball (11): 2004, 2006, 2007, 2008, 2009, 2010, 2011, 2014, 2021, 2024, 2025
- Men's basketball (2): 2015, 2019
- Women's basketball (2): 1995, 2024
- Men's cross country (3): 1977, 1986, 1987
- Women's cross country (4): 1983, 1987, 1989, 1990
- Men's golf (3): 1992, 2001, 2008
- Women's golf (3): 2005, 2007, 2009
- Men's soccer (8): 2008, 2009, 2011, 2013, 2014, 2018, 2023, 2025
- Women's soccer (5): 2010, 2011, 2021, 2022, 2023
- Men's tennis (13): 1983, 1987, 1988, 1989, 1990, 1996, 1997, 2005, 2010, 2011, 2022, 2024, 2025
- Women's tennis (3): 2007, 2010, 2013
- Men's indoor track and field (1): 1977
- Men's outdoor track and field (8): 1968, 1969, 1982, 1988, 1989, 1990, 2011, 2012
- Women's outdoor track and field (5): 1982, 1988, 1989, 1991, 1992
- Men's volleyball (8): 2006, 2007, 2009, 2012, 2013, 2015, 2018, 2024, 2026
- Women's volleyball (3): 1988, 2003, 2004
- Men's water polo (22): 1969, 1970, 1971, 1972, 1973, 1974, 1975, 1976, 1977, 1978, 1980, 1981, 1982, 1983, 1985, 1987, 1988, 1989, 1991, 1992, 1993, 2023
- Women's water polo (8): 2011, 2012, 2014, 2015, 2017, 2018, 2022, 2023

=== Team ===
The Anteaters of UC Irvine earned 7 NCAA championships at the Division I level.

- Men's (7)
  - Volleyball (4): 2007, 2009, 2012, 2013
  - Water polo (3): 1970, 1982, 1989

Results

School year	Sport	Opponent	Score
1970–71	Men's water polo	UCLA	7–6
1982–83	Men's water polo	Stanford	7–4
1989–90	Men's water polo	California	9–8
2006–07	Men's volleyball	Purdue Fort Wayne	3–1
2008–09	Men's volleyball	USC	3–2
2011–12	Men's volleyball	USC	3–0
2012–13	Men's volleyball	BYU	3–0

=== Division II Championships ===
UC Irvine won 15 national championships at the NCAA Division II level.

- Baseball: 1973, 1974
- Men's cross country: 1975, 1976
- Men's golf: 1975
- Men's outdoor track and field: 1976
- Men's swimming and diving: 1969, 1970, 1971
- Men's tennis: 1970, 1971, 1972, 1973, 1975, 1977

=== Club Sports Championships ===
Below are seventeen national club team championships:

- Co-ed archery (2): 2016 (USIAC), 2022 (USA Archery)
- Men's archery (1): 2016 (USIAC)
- Women's archery (1): 2016 (USIAC)
- Co-ed badminton (3): 2004, 2007, 2008 (ABA)
- Men's badminton (2): 2007, 2008 (ABA)
- Co-ed paintball – Division IAA (1): 2006 (NCPA)
- Co-ed sailing (7): 1972, 1979, 1980, 1987, 1988, 1990, 2006 (ICSA)

Note: Those with no denoted division is assumed that the institution earned a national championship at the highest level.

=== Individual ===
UC Irvine had 3 Anteaters win NCAA individual championships at the Division I level.

NCAA individual championships
Order	School year	Athlete(s)	Sport	Source
1	1977–78	Mauricio Bardales	Men's outdoor track and field	
2	1977–78	Steven Scott	Men's outdoor track and field	
3	2011–12	Charles Jock	Men's outdoor track and field	

At the NCAA Division II level, UC Irvine garnered 61 individual championships.

== Facilities ==
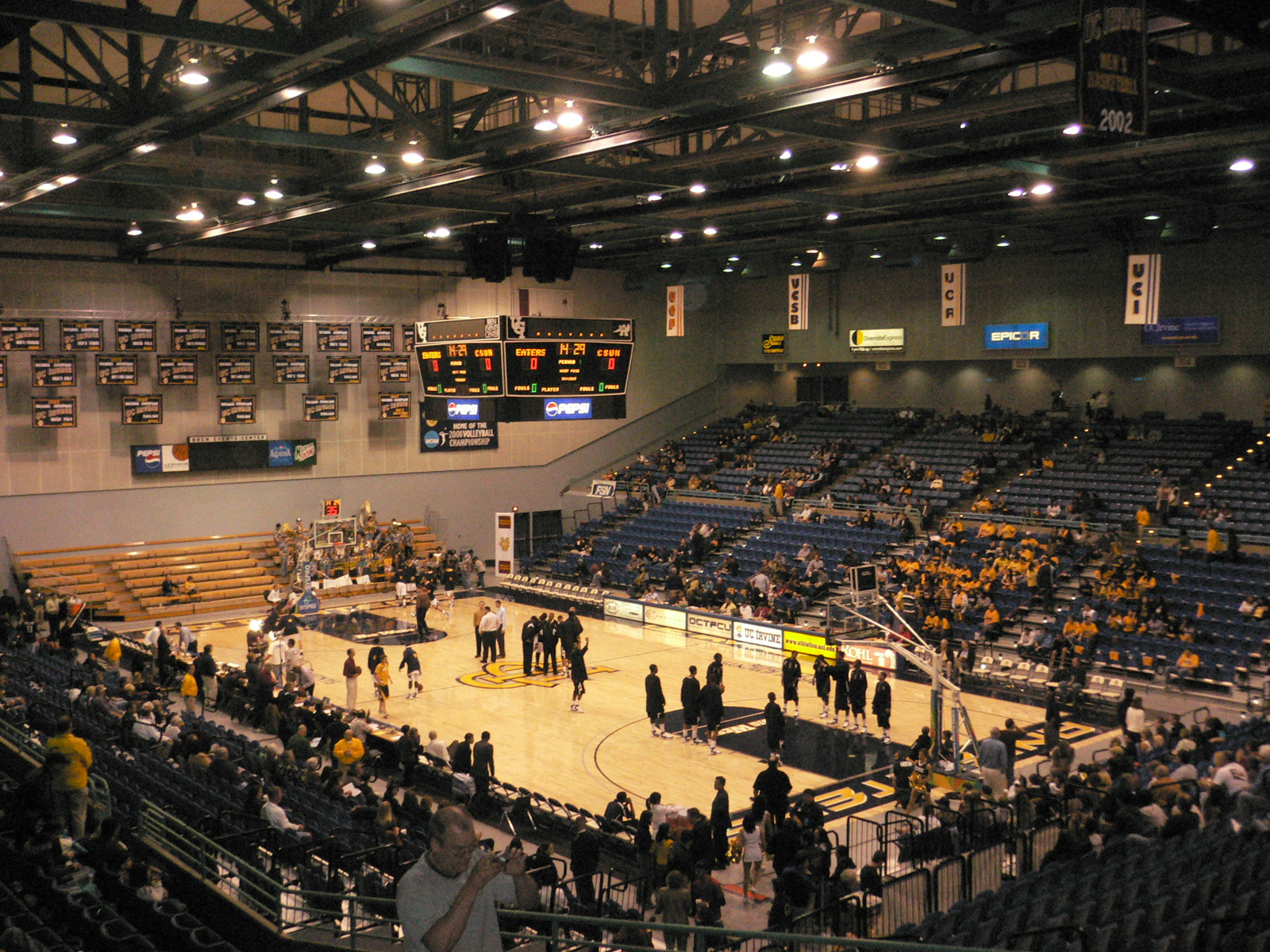
Basketball court of the Bren Events Center before a game

The UCI basketball and volleyball teams compete at the Bren Events Center as the main venue. They train and compete at the nearby Crawford Hall as the secondary location. The baseball team plays in Anteater Ballpark, which is located behind the Mesa Parking Structure. Anteater Stadium itself is part of UCI's Crawford Athletics Complex, which houses the track and swimming facilities.

== Rivalries ==
Since 2006, the UC Irvine Anteaters have participated in the annual "Black and Blue Rivalry Series" with Long Beach State. In this challenge, each school earns points for its collective conference championships and head-to-head victories against each other (across all NCAA sports in which both schools participate). The totals are added up at the end of the season and a winner is declared.

== Mascot ==
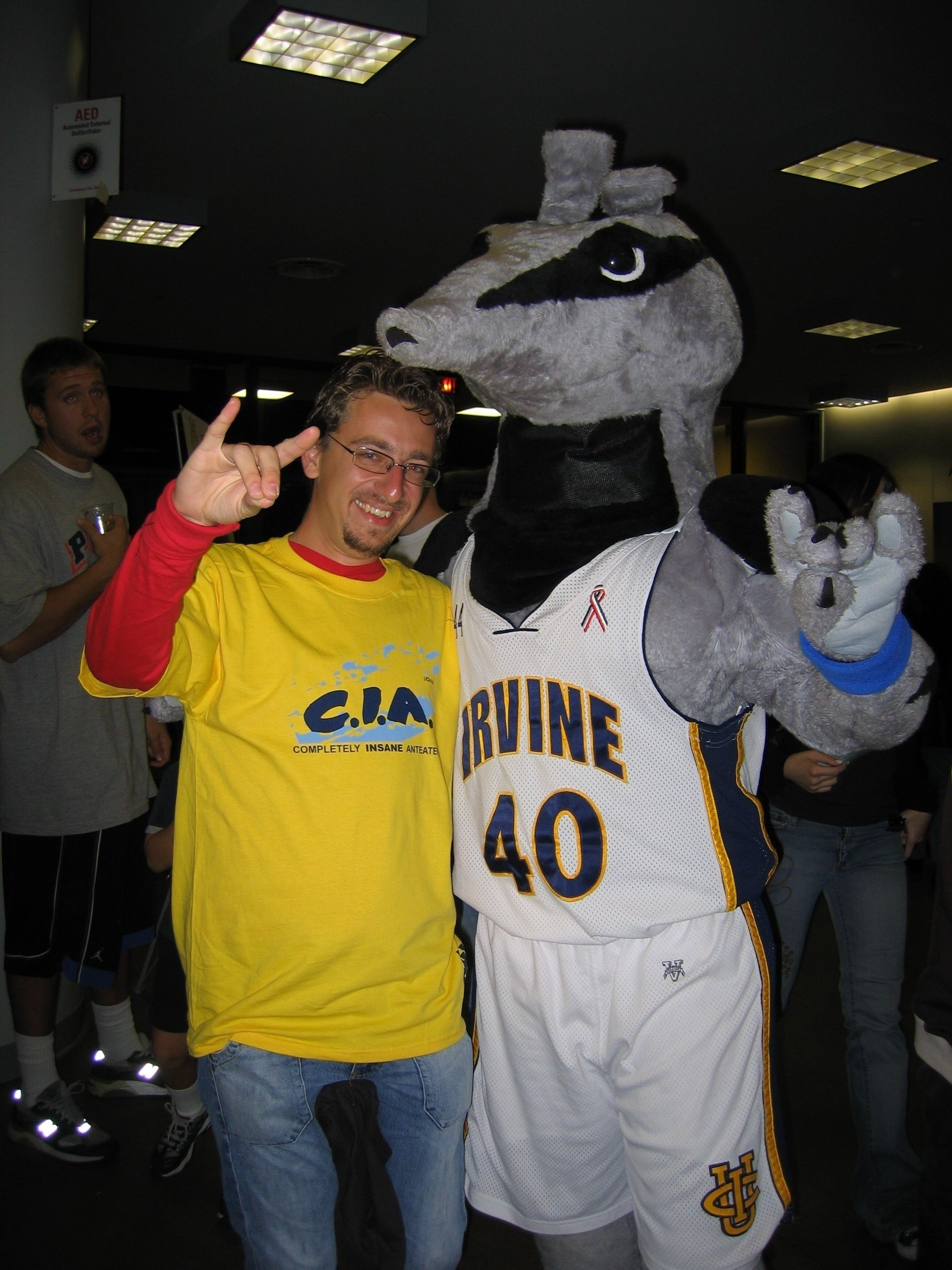
Peter the Anteater performing the "Rip 'Em 'Eaters" hand signal with a fan

The anteater was chosen in 1965 when students were allowed to submit mascot candidates, which would be voted on in a campus election. Three undergraduates named Pat Glasgow, Bob Ernst, and Schuyler Hadley Basset III were credited with choosing the anteater and designing a cartoon representation, having been disappointed with other candidates such as a roadrunner, unicorn, seahawk and golden bison.

While often attributed to the Johnny Hart comic strip B.C., the original anteater design was based on the Playboy bunny.

In August 2007, a small stuffed anteater accompanied astronaut Tracy Caldwell on Space Shuttle Endeavour mission STS-118.

Following the 2015 men's basketball team's inaugural appearance in the NCAA Division I tournament, Mashable named Peter the Anteater the winner of its "Mascot Madness" tournament. The mascot also appeared on an episode of Conan.

Since 2019, anonymous students distribute "Petr [sic] stickers", a satiric misspelling of Peter. These stickers are designed with unique designs in limited quantities, and the distribution location is posted on Instagram spontaneously, encouraging students to run to collect them.

== Sports sponsorship timeline ==
Current sports Former sports
