= 1981 NCAA Men's Water Polo Championship =

Water polo tournament season

Tournament details
- Dates: December 1981
- Teams: 8

Final positions
- Champions: Stanford (4th title)
- Runners-up: Long Beach State (1st title game)

Tournament statistics
- Matches played: 12
- Goals scored: 228 (19 per match)
- Attendance: 2,579 (215 per match)
- Top goal scorer(s): James Bergeson, Stanford (12)

Awards
- Best player: James Bergeson, Stanford & Jody Campbell, Stanford

The 1981 NCAA Men's Water Polo Championship was the 13th annual NCAA Men's Water Polo Championship to determine the national champion of NCAA men's college water polo. Tournament matches were played at the Belmont Plaza Pool in Long Beach, California during December 1981.

Stanford defeated Long Beach State in the final, 17–6, to win their fourth, and second consecutive, national title.

James Bergeson (Stanford) and Jody Campbell (Stanford) were named the Co-Most Outstanding Players of the tournament. An All-Tournament Team, consisting of seven players, was also named.

Bergeson was also the tournament's leading scorer, with 12 goals.

== Qualification ==
Since there has only ever been one single national championship for water polo, all NCAA men's water polo programs (whether from Division I, Division II, or Division III) were eligible. A total of 8 teams were invited to contest this championship.

Team	Appearance	Previous
Air Force	4th	1979
Brown	3rd	1979
California	9th	1980
Long Beach State	6th	1975
Stanford	9th	1980
UC Irvine	12th	1980
UC Santa Barbara	9th	1980
UCLA	10th	1979

== Bracket ==
- Site: Belmont Plaza Pool, Long Beach, California

Fifth place
UC Santa Barbara	9
UCLA	8
Seventh place
Brown	9
Air Force	8

Consolation semifinals
Brown	6
UC Santa Barbara	16
Air Force	5
UCLA	16

First round
Stanford	8
Brown	5
UC Irvine	9
UC Santa Barbara	8
Long Beach State	15
Air Force	6
California	10
UCLA	7

Championship semifinals
Stanford	13
UC Irvine	6
Long Beach State	11
California	9

Championship
Stanford	17
Long Beach State	6
Third place
UC Irvine	10
California	11

== All-tournament team ==
- James Bergeson, Stanford (Co-Most outstanding player)
- Jody Campbell, Stanford (Co-Most outstanding player)
- Dave George, UC Santa Barbara
- Chris Kelsey, Stanford
- Alan Mouchawar, Stanford
- Vince Vanelli, Stanford
- John Vargas, UC Irvine

== See also ==
- NCAA Men's Water Polo Championship
