= 1980 NCAA Men's Water Polo Championship =

Water polo tournament season

Tournament details
- Dates: December 1980
- Teams: 8

Final positions
- Champions: Stanford (3rd title)
- Runners-up: California (7th title game)
- Third place: UC Irvine
- Fourth place: Pepperdine

Tournament statistics
- Matches played: 12
- Goals scored: 214 (17.83 per match)
- Attendance: 2,401 (200 per match)
- Top goal scorer(s): Kevin Robertson, California & Scott Schulte, Bucknell (11)

Awards
- Best player: John Gansel, Stanford & Kevin Robertson, California

The 1980 NCAA Men's Water Polo Championship was the 12th annual NCAA Men's Water Polo Championship to determine the national champion of NCAA men's college water polo. Tournament matches were played at the Belmont Plaza Pool in Long Beach, California during December 1980.

Stanford defeated California in the final, 8–6, to win their third national title.

John Gansel (Stanford) and Kevin Robertson (California) were named the Co-Most Outstanding Players of the tournament. An All-Tournament Team, consisting of nine players, was also named.

Robertson and Scott Schulte (Bucknell) were the tournament's leading scorers (12 goals). Schulte is the only men's water polo player to be the leading scorer in four consecutive tournaments (1977–1980).

== Qualification ==
Since there has only ever been one single national championship for water polo, all NCAA men's water polo programs (whether from Division I, Division II, or Division III) were eligible. A total of 8 teams were invited to contest this championship.

Team	Appearance	Previous
Bucknell	4th	1979
California	8th	1979
Loyola–Chicago	6th	1979
Pepperdine	3rd	1978
USC	5th	1973
Stanford	8th	1979
UC Irvine	11th	1978
UC Santa Barbara	8th	1979

== Bracket ==
- Site: Belmont Plaza Pool, Long Beach, California

Fifth place
USC	11
UC Santa Barbara	4
Seventh place
Loyola–Chicago	4
Bucknell	8

Consolation semifinals
Loyola–Chicago	3
USC	16
Bucknell	8
UC Santa Barbara	10

First round
Stanford	22
Loyola–Chicago	5
Pepperdine	9
USC	8
UC Irvine	13
Bucknell	4
California	11
UC Santa Barbara	7

Championship semifinals
Stanford	17
Pepperdine	6
UC Irvine	7
California	9

Championship
Stanford	8
California	6
Third place
Pepperdine	8
UC Irvine	10

== All-tournament team ==
- John Gansel, Stanford (Co-Most outstanding player)
- Kevin Robertson, California (Co-Most outstanding player)
- James Bergeson, Stanford
- Jody Campbell, Stanford
- Peter Campbell, UC Irvine
- Bob Diepersloot, California
- Chris Kelsey, Stanford
- Alan Mouchawar, Stanford
- Terry Schroeder, Pepperdine

== See also ==
- NCAA Men's Water Polo Championship
