= 1977 NCAA Men's Water Polo Championship =

Water polo tournament season

Tournament details
- Dates: December 1977
- Teams: 8

Final positions
- Champions: California (4th title)
- Runners-up: UC Irvine (5th title game)
- Third place: Stanford
- Fourth place: Pepperdine

Tournament statistics
- Matches played: 12
- Goals scored: 249 (20.75 per match)
- Attendance: 765 (64 per match)
- Top goal scorer(s): Scott Schulte, Bucknell (14)

Awards
- Best player: Gary Figueroa, UC Irvine

The 1977 NCAA Men's Water Polo Championship was the ninth annual NCAA Men's Water Polo Championship to determine the national champion of NCAA men's college water polo. Tournament matches were played at the Smith Swim Center at Brown University in Providence, Rhode Island during December 1977.

California defeated UC Irvine in the final, 8–6, to win their fourth national title. This was a rematch of the 1973, 1974, and 1975 finals, all won by the Golden Bears.

The leading scorer for the tournament was Scott Schulte from Bucknell (14 goals). Gary Figueroa, from UC Irvine, was named the Most Outstanding Player. An All-Tournament Team, consisting of seven players, was also named.

== Qualification ==
Since there has only ever been one single national championship for water polo, all NCAA men's water polo programs (whether from Division I, Division II, or Division III) were eligible. A total of 8 teams were invited to contest this championship.

Team	Appearance	Previous
Arizona	3rd	1976
Brown	1st	Never
Bucknell	1st	Never
California	5th	1975
Loyola–Chicago	3rd	1976
Pepperdine	1st	Never
Stanford	6th	1976
UC Irvine	9th	1976

== Bracket ==
- Site: Smith Swim Center, Providence, Rhode Island

Fifth place
Arizona	14
Loyola–Chicago	4
Seventh place
Brown	7
Bucknell	16

Consolation semifinals
Brown	6
Arizona	15
Bucknell	9
Loyola–Chicago	13

First round
Stanford	14
Brown	2
UC Irvine	14
Arizona	7
California	28
Bucknell	10
Pepperdine	14
Loyola–Chicago	9

Championship semifinals
Stanford	7
UC Irvine	9
California	11
Pepperdine	10

Championship
UC Irvine	6
California	8
Third place
Stanford	10
Pepperdine	6

== All-tournament team ==
- Gary Figueroa, UC Irvine (Most outstanding player)
- Marty Davis, Stanford
- John Gansel, Stanford
- Mike Loughlin, California
- Jim Purcell, California
- Kevin Robertson, California
- Terry Schroeder, Pepperdine
