= 1979 NCAA Men's Water Polo Championship =

Water polo tournament season

Tournament details
- Dates: December 1979
- Teams: 8

Final positions
- Champions: UC Santa Barbara (1st title)
- Runners-up: UCLA (6th title game)
- Third place: Stanford
- Fourth place: California

Tournament statistics
- Matches played: 12
- Goals scored: 246 (20.5 per match)
- Attendance: 2,542 (212 per match)
- Top goal scorer(s): Scott Schulte, Bucknell (11)

Awards
- Best player: Greg Boyer, UCSB

The 1979 NCAA Men's Water Polo Championship was the 11th annual NCAA Men's Water Polo Championship to determine the national champion of NCAA men's college water polo. Tournament matches were played at the Belmont Plaza Pool in Long Beach, California during December 1979.

UC Santa Barbara defeated UCLA in the final, 11–3, to win their first national title.

Greg Boyer from UC Santa Barbara was named the Most Outstanding Player of the tournament. An All-Tournament Team, consisting of seven players, was also named. For the third consecutive year, the tournament's leading scorer was Scott Schulte from Bucknell (11 goals).

== Qualification ==
Since there has only ever been one single national championship for water polo, all NCAA men's water polo programs (whether from Division I, Division II, or Division III) were eligible. A total of 8 teams were invited to contest this championship.

| Team | Appearance | Previous |
|---|---|---|
| Air Force | 3rd | 1978 |
| Brown | 2nd | 1977 |
| Bucknell | 3rd | 1978 |
| California | 7th | 1978 |
| Loyola–Chicago | 5th | 1978 |
| Stanford | 7th | 1978 |
| UCLA | 9th | 1976 |
| UC Santa Barbara | 7th | 1976 |

== Bracket ==
- Site: Belmont Plaza Pool, Long Beach, California

Fifth place
Bucknell | 9
Loyola–Chicago | 5
Seventh place
Air Force | 10
Brown | 15

Consolation semifinals
Air Force | 9
Bucknell | 11
Loyola–Chicago (3OT) | 11
Brown | 10

First round
California | 19
Air Force | 7
UCLA | 17
Bucknell | 7
UC Santa Barbara | 21
Loyola–Chicago | 4
Stanford | 13
Brown | 5

Championship semifinals
California | 9
UCLA | 10
UC Santa Barbara | 10
Stanford | 9

Championship
UCLA | 3
UC Santa Barbara | 11
Third place
California | 10
Stanford | 11

== All-tournament team ==
- Greg Boyer, UC Santa Barbara (Most outstanding player)
- John Dobrott, UC Santa Barbara
- Randy Kalbus, Stanford
- Kevin Robertson, California
- Rick Sherburne, UCLA
- Carlos Steffens, California
- Craig Wilson, UC Santa Barbara

== See also ==
- NCAA Men's Water Polo Championship
