= UC Irvine Anteaters men's water polo =

American college soccer team

- Founded: 1965; 61 years ago
- University: University of California, Irvine
- Head coach: Daniel Klatt (4th season)
- Conference: Big West
- Location: Irvine, California, US
- Stadium: Anteater Aquatics Complex (capacity: 750)
- Nickname: Anteaters, UCI

NCAA tournament championships
- 1970, 1982, 1989

NCAA tournament runner-up
- 1973, 1974, 1975, 1977, 1985

NCAA tournament Semifinals
- 1970, 1972, 1973, 1974, 1975, 1976, 1977, 1978, 1980, 1981, 1982, 1983, 1985, 1987, 1989, 1991, 1992, 1993

NCAA tournament appearances
- 1969, 1970, 1971, 1972, 1973, 1974, 1975, 1976, 1977, 1978, 1980, 1981, 1982, 1983, 1985, 1987, 1988, 1989, 1991, 1992, 1993, 2023

Conference tournament championships
- 2023

Conference regular season championships
- 1970, 1971, 1972, 1978, 1980, 1982, 1985, 1987, 1989, 1991, 2000, 2023, 2024

The UC Irvine Anteaters men's water polo program represents the University of California, Irvine in all NCAA Division I men's water polo competitions. Founded in 1965, the Anteaters compete in the Big West Conference.

The Anteaters are coached by Daniel Klatt, who has coached the team since 2022. Daniel Klatt historically only coached the UC Irvine women's water polo team since 2004, and has previously served as an assistant for the U.S. Women's Water Polo Olympic Team in 2012 and 2016. UC Irvine plays their home matches at the Anteater Aquatics Complex.

== History ==
UC Irvine's men's water polo team won three NCAA Division I national championships in 1970, 1982, and 1989.

UC Irvine's head men's water polo coach for many years was Ted Newland, who died in 2019. As the Anteaters' head coach from 1966-2005, Newland had a lifetime record of 714–345–5. In his 39 years at the helm the Anteaters won three national championships, and the team was consistently rated among the nation's top 5 programs. Many world-class water polo players have been affiliated with UCI, with more than 70 NCAA All-Americans and 13 Olympians being produced by the program. Four Anteaters were a part of the United States team that won the silver medal at the 2008 Olympics in Beijing.

In 2023, the Big West, UC Irvine's primary conference, began sponsorship of men's water polo. UC Irvine won the inaugural Big West men's water polo regular season and championship, beating conference rival UC Santa Barbara 11–9, and ending a 30-year NCAA playoff drought dating back to 1993.

== Postseason ==
=== NCAA Tournament ===
UC Irvine has appeared in twenty-two NCAA Tournaments. Their combined record is 29–19.

Year	Round	Opponent	Result
1969	First Round	California	L 4–5
1970	First Round; Semifinals; National Championship	USC; Long Beach State; UCLA	W 7–4; W 9–6; W 7–6
1971	First Round	CSU Fullerton	L 4–5
1972	First Round; Semifinals	UC Santa Barbara; UCLA	W 16–12; L 10–15
1973	First Round; Semifinals; National Championship	Long Beach State; USC; California	W 7–5; W 9–5; L 4–8
1974	First Round; Semifinals; National Championship	UC Santa Barbara; UCLA; California	W 10–6; W 5–3; L 6–7
1975	First Round; Semifinals; National Championship	UC Davis; Stanford; California	W 19–4; W 9–8; L 8–9
1976	First Round; Semifinals	Pittsburgh; UCLA	W 18–4; L 9–14
1977	First Round; Semifinals; National Championship	Arizona; Stanford; California	W 14–7; W 9–7; L 6–8
1978	First Round; Semifinals	Loyola (IL); California	W 14–5; L 5–7
1980	First Round; Semifinals	Bucknell; California	W 13–4; L 7–9
1981	First Round; Semifinals	UC Santa Barbara; Stanford	W 9–8; L 6–13
1982	First Round; Semifinals; National Championship	Brown; California; Stanford	W 13–2; W 8–5; W 7–4
1983	First Round; Semifinals	Loyola (IL); USC	W 12–8; L 8–9
1985	First Round; Semifinals; National Championship	Brown; UCLA; Stanford	W 15–8; W 7–6; L 11–12
1987	First Round; Semifinals	Stanford; California	W 8–6; L 3–7
1988	First Round	USC	L 11–13
1989	First Round; Semifinals; National Championship	UALR; Stanford; California	W 13–6; W 8–7; W 9–8
1991	First Round; Semifinals	Long Beach State; California	W 11–8; L 10–13
1992	First Round; Semifinals	Pepperdine; California	W 11–8; L 5–8
1993	First Round; Semifinals	Pacific; Stanford	W 12–10; L 8–10
2023	First Round	Princeton	L 7-12

== Yearly records ==
Below is a table of the program's yearly records.

Season	Coach	Overall	Conference	Standing	Postseason
Independent (Division I) (1965–1969)
1965	Al Irwin	14–4	—	—	
1966	Ted Newland	14–6	—	—	
1967	Ted Newland	18–4	—	—	
1968	Ted Newland	25–2	—	—	
1969	Ted Newland	20–8	—	—	NCAA First Round
Independent:		90–24	—		
Golden Coast Conference (Golden Coast) (1970–1972)
1970	Ted Newland	27–2	—	1st	NCAA Champions
1971	Ted Newland	20–6	—	1st	NCAA First Round
1972	Ted Newland	18–5	—	1st	NCAA Semifinals
Golden Coast (1st Stint) :		65–13	—		
Independent (Division I) (1973–1976)
1973	Ted Newland	16–4	—	—	NCAA Runners-up
1974	Ted Newland	17–5	—	—	NCAA Runners-up
1975	Ted Newland	15–6	—	—	NCAA Runners-up
1976	Ted Newland	16–6	—	—	NCAA Semifinals
Independent:		64–21	—		
Big West Conference (Big West/PCAA) (1977–1991)
1977	Ted Newland	23–5	9–0	2nd	NCAA Runners-up
1978	Ted Newland	26–8	6–0	1st	NCAA Semifinals
1979	Ted Newland	15–12	6–1	2nd	
1980	Ted Newland	25–5–1	6–1	1st	NCAA Semifinals
1981	Ted Newland	22–10–1	4–2	3rd	NCAA Semifinals
1982	Ted Newland	30–0	6–0	1st	NCAA Champions
1983	Ted Newland	22–11–2	4–2	3rd	NCAA Semifinals
1984	Ted Newland	16–12–1	8–4	2nd	
1985	Ted Newland	23–8	10–2	1st	NCAA Runners-up
1986	Ted Newland	17–11	10–2	2nd	
1987	Ted Newland	20–9	9–1	1st	NCAA Semifinals
1988	Ted Newland	18–15	8–2	2nd	NCAA First Round
1989	Ted Newland	27–6	8–2	T-1st	NCAA Champions
1990	Ted Newland	13–6	3–7	5th	
1991	Ted Newland	21–9	8–2	T-1st	NCAA Semifinals
Big West (1st Stint) :		318–127–5	105–28		
Mountain Pacific Sports Federation (MPSF) (1992–2015)
1992	Ted Newland	20–10	10–3	2nd	NCAA Semifinals
1993	Ted Newland	18–11	6–4	3rd	NCAA Semifinals
1994	Ted Newland	11–13	3–5	7th	
1995	Ted Newland	16–8	6–2	4th	
1996	Ted Newland	16–8	6–2	4th	
1997	Ted Newland	12–14	3–5	6th	
1998	Ted Newland	19–8	6–2	2nd	
1999	Ted Newland	7–17	0–8	9th	
2000	Ted Newland	20–7	7–1	T-1st	
2001	Ted Newland	7–15	1–7	8th	
2002	Ted Newland	16–11	4–4	6th	
2003	Ted Newland	12–17	3–5	7th	
2004	Ted Newland	16–14	4–4	T-4th	
2005	Marc Hunt	18–12	6–2	2nd	
2006	Marc Hunt	10–21	2–6	6th	
2007	Marc Hunt	14–11	4–4	5th	
2008	Marc Hunt	11–15	1–7	8th	
2009	Marc Hunt	17–12	3–5	6th	
2010	Marc Hunt	18–8	4–4	5th	
2011	Marc Hunt	17–12	2–6	T-6th	
2012	Marc Hunt	14–12	0–8	9th	
2013	Marc Hunt	13–15	1–7	T-7th	
2014	Marc Hunt	15–14	2–6	T-6th	
2015	Marc Hunt	16–12	3–6	7th	
MPSF:		353–297	87–117		
Golden Coast Conference (Golden Coast) (2016–2022)
2016	Marc Hunt	10–14	1–4	5th	
2017	Marc Hunt	15–10	3–2	2nd	
2018	Marc Hunt	9–17	1–4	5th	
2019	Marc Hunt	7–16	0–5	6th	
2020	Marc Hunt	No season held due to Covid-19	No season held due to Covid-19	—	
2021	Marc Hunt	8–13	1–4	6th	
2022	Daniel Klatt	6–13	2–3	5th	
Golden Coast (2nd Stint) :		55–83	8–22		
Big West Conference (Big West) (2023–present)
2023	Daniel Klatt	18–10	4–1	1st	NCAA First Round
2024	Daniel Klatt	18–9	5–0	1st	
2025	Daniel Klatt	15–12	2–3	5th	
Big West (2nd Stint) :		51–31	11–4		
Total:		974–586–5			
National champion Postseason invitational champion Conference regular season champion Conference regular season and conference tournament champion Division regular season champion Division regular season and conference tournament champion Conference tournament champion
