= 1978 NCAA Men's Water Polo Championship =

Water polo tournament season

Tournament details
- Dates: December 1978
- Teams: 8

Final positions
- Champions: Stanford (2nd title)
- Runners-up: California (6th title game)
- Third place: UC Irvine
- Fourth place: Pepperdine

Tournament statistics
- Matches played: 12
- Goals scored: 216 (18 per match)
- Attendance: 2,541 (212 per match)
- Top goal scorer(s): Scott Schulte, Bucknell (13)

The 1978 NCAA Men's Water Polo Championship was the 10th annual NCAA Men's Water Polo Championship to determine the national champion of NCAA men's college water polo. Tournament matches were played at the Belmont Plaza Pool in Long Beach, California during December 1978.

Stanford defeated California in the final, 7–6 (in three overtimes), to win their second national title.

For the second consecutive year, the leading scorer for the tournament was Scott Schulte from Bucknell (13 goals). There was no Most Outstanding Player for this tournament, but an All-Tournament Team, consisting of seven players, was named.

== Qualification ==
Since there has only ever been one single national championship for water polo, all NCAA men's water polo programs (whether from Division I, Division II, or Division III) were eligible. A total of 8 teams were invited to contest this championship.

Team	Appearance	Previous
Air Force	2nd	1974
Bucknell	2nd	1977
California	6th	1977
Loyola–Chicago	4th	1977
Pepperdine	2nd	1977
Stanford	7th	1977
Texas A&M	2nd	1976
UC Irvine	10th	1977

== Bracket ==
- Site: Belmont Plaza Pool, Long Beach, California

Fifth place
Bucknell	6
Loyola–Chicago	7
Seventh place
Air Force	6
Texas A&M	11

Consolation semifinals
Air Force	10
Bucknell	12
Loyola–Chicago	12
Texas A&M	5

First round
Stanford	20
Air Force	2
Pepperdine	10
Bucknell	9
UC Irvine	14
Loyola–Chicago	5
California	15
Texas A&M	6

Championship semifinals
Stanford	14
Pepperdine	8
UC Irvine	5
California	7

Championship
Stanford (3OT)	7
California	6
Third place
Pepperdine	7
UC Irvine	12

== All-tournament team ==
- Rob Arnold, Stanford
- Doug Burke, Stanford
- Peter Campbell, UC Irvine
- John Gansel, Stanford
- Kevin Robertson, California
- Terry Schroeder, Pepperdine
- Carlos Steffens, California

== See also ==
- NCAA Men's Water Polo Championship
