= 1975 NCAA Men's Water Polo Championship =

Water polo tournament season

Tournament details
- Dates: December 1975
- Teams: 8

Final positions
- Champions: California (3rd title)
- Runners-up: UC Irvine (3rd title game)
- Third place: UCLA
- Fourth place: Stanford

Tournament statistics
- Matches played: 12
- Goals scored: 228 (19 per match)
- Attendance: 3,326 (277 per match)
- Top goal scorer(s): Gary Figueroa, UC Irvine (13)

Awards
- Best player: Jon Svendsen, California

The 1975 NCAA Men's Water Polo Championship was the seventh annual NCAA Men's Water Polo Championship to determine the national champion of NCAA men's college water polo. Tournament matches were played at the Belmont Plaza Pool in Long Beach, California during December 1975.

California defeated UC Irvine in the final, 9–8, to win their third national title. This was a rematch of the previous two years' finals, both won by California.

The leading scorer for the tournament was Gary Figueroa from UC Irvine (13 goals). Jon Svendsen, from California, was named the Most Outstanding Player. An All-Tournament Team, consisting of eight players, was also named.

== Qualification ==
Since there has only ever been one single national championship for water polo, all NCAA men's water polo programs (whether from Division I, Division II, or Division III) were eligible. A total of 8 teams were invited to contest this championship.

Team	Appearance	Previous
Arizona	1st	Never
Army	1st	Never
California	4th	1974
Long Beach State	5th	1973
Stanford	4th	1974
UC Davis	2nd	1974
UC Irvine	7th	1974
UCLA	7th	1974

== Bracket ==
- Site: Belmont Plaza Pool, Long Beach, California

Fifth place
Long Beach State	13
Arizona	6
Seventh place
Army	3
UC Davis	20

Consolation semifinals
Army	0
Long Beach State	18
Arizona	9
UC Davis	8

First round
UCLA	26
Army	2
California	9
Long Beach State	6
Stanford	15
Arizona	3
UC Irvine	19
UC Davis	4

Championship semifinals
UCLA	9
California	13
Stanford	8
UC Irvine	9

Championship
California	9
UC Irvine	8
Third place
UCLA	6
Stanford	5

== All-tournament team ==
- Jon Svendsen, California (Most outstanding player)
- Guy Antley, UC Irvine
- Tom Belfanti, California
- Walter Bricker, California
- Gary Figueroa, UC Irvine
- Boyd Philpot, UC Irvine
- John Stephens, UCLA
- Joe Vargas, UCLA

== See also ==
- NCAA Men's Water Polo Championship
