= 1993 NCAA Men's Water Polo Championship =

Water polo tournament season

Tournament details
- Dates: December 1993
- Teams: 8

Final positions
- Champions: Stanford (7th title)
- Runners-up: USC (3rd title game)

Tournament statistics
- Matches played: 12
- Goals scored: 272 (22.67 per match)
- Attendance: 3,165 (264 per match)
- Top goal scorer(s): Michael Nalu, UCSD (13)

The 1993 NCAA Men's Water Polo Championship was the 25th annual NCAA Men's Water Polo Championship to determine the national champion of NCAA men's collegiate water polo. Tournament matches were played at the Belmont Plaza Pool in Long Beach, California during December 1993.

Stanford defeated USC in the final, 11–9, to win their seventh national title. The Cardinal (24–6) were coached by Dante Dettamanti

Neither a Most Outstanding Player nor an All-Tournament Team was named this year.

The tournament's leading scorer, with 13 goals, was Michael Nalu from UC San Diego.

== Qualification ==
Since there has only ever been one single national championship for water polo, all NCAA men's water polo programs (whether from Division I, Division II, or Division III) were eligible. A total of 8 teams were invited to contest this championship.

Team	Appearance	Previous
California	20th	1992
UC Irvine	21st	1992
UC San Diego	4th	1992
Massachusetts	1st	Never
Navy	8th	1992
Pacific	1st	Never
USC	13th	1992
Stanford	20th	1992

== Bracket ==
- Site: Belmont Plaza Pool, Long Beach, California

Fifth place
Pacific	16
Massachusetts	5
Seventh place
Navy	20
UC San Diego	17

Consolation semifinals
Navy	7
Pacific	13
Massachusetts	15
UC San Diego	13

First round
Stanford	16
Navy	1
UC Irvine	12
Pacific	10
California	17
Massachusetts	4
USC	16
UC San Diego	9

Championship semifinals
Stanford	10
UC Irvine	8
California	11
USC (2OT)	12

Championship
Stanford	11
USC	9
Third place
UC Irvine	6
California	14

== See also ==
- NCAA Men's Water Polo Championship
