= Alan Mouchawar =

American water polo player (born 1960)

Personal information
- Full name: Alan Edward Mouchawar
- Born: August 3, 1960 (age 66) Los Angeles, California, U.S.
- Education: Stanford University (1982); U. Cal San Diego M.D. (1987)
- Occupations: Physician, Anesthesiologist
- Spouse: Jeanine
- Children: 2

Sport
- Sport: Water Polo
- Position: Driver (WP)
- College team: Stanford University
- Club: Sunset Aquatics WP (San Diego); Olympic Club (88-91)
- Coached by: Dante Detamanti (Stanford); Bill Barnett (88 Olympics)
Medal record
Men's water polo
Representing the United States
Olympic Games
| Silver medal – second place | 1988 Seoul | Team competition |

Alan Mouchawar (born August 3, 1960) is a former water polo player who competed for Stanford University, and won a silver medal for the United States at the 1988 Summer Olympics in Seoul, South Korea. After graduating the University of San Diego Medical School around 1987, he competed in the 1988 Seoul Olympics. He later had a career as a cardiac anesthesiologist.

== Early life ==
Mouchawar was born August 3, 1960, in greater Los Angeles, California, and attended Long Beach Polytechnic High School, playing water polo from around 1975-1978. He played baseball as a shortstop for Long Beach Poly through his Junior year, but gave it up to compete with the swim team in his Senior year on the advice of brother Maurice who told him it would help improve his water polo skills. From a family that greatly valued the experience of competing in water polo, each of his brothers played the sport. Brother Maurice, whose example he followed, both attended Medical school and played water polo for Stanford. Mouchawar's younger brother Larry was a U.C. Santa Barbara All American in the sport, and played for the U.S. team. His younger engineer brother Marvin, played on Stanford's 1987 NCAA national championship team, and from around 1988-91 competed with San Francisco's Olympic Club.

== Stanford University ==
Graduating in 1982, Mouchawar attended and played water polo for Stanford University from 1978 to 1982, where he was managed and trained by Water Polo Hall of Fame member and Head Coach Dante Detamanti who coached water polo at Stanford from 1977-2001. While playing for Stanford, Mouchawar helped lead the team to three NCAA team national championships in the years 1978, 1980, and 1981. He was an All American at Stanford in four successive years. A frequent scorer, Mouchawar often played in the driver position in water polo, lining up around the goal posts, and placing him in a good position to score or make assists from the perimeter of play.

From 1978-1981, he played for the U.S. Jr. National team.

== 1988 Seoul Olympic silver medal ==
Managed and trained by U.S. Olympic Water Polo Coach Bill Barnett, at the September, 1988 Summer Olympics in Seoul, Korea, Mouchawar was part of the U.S. Water Polo team that won the silver medal in the 1988 Olympic Men's water polo competition. His Olympic teammates James Bergeson, and Jody Campbell had also played water polo team as team mates at Stanford. Terry Schroeder, who would later serve as a U.S. Olympic team coach, was the 1988 U.S. Olympic water polo team captain.

Pre-Olympic favorite Yugoslavia and the U.S. team were part of group play in their first Olympic match, where the U.S. team bettered Yugoslavia 7-6, with Mouchawar scoring an important goal. Despite the U.S. having beaten Yugoslavia in an early, their water polo team performed better in the remaining rounds of group play, with the U.S. team recording a loss to the team from Spain in a score of 9-7. With more overall goals, the Yugoslavian and U.S. teams both advanced to the semi-final rounds, where they each won their first match and were later paired in the final match to for the gold and silver medals. The U.S. final match with Yugoslavia was tied 6-6 in regular play, but in overtime Yugoslavia took a 9-6 lead making the first three goals, and later won the gold medal with a 9-7 overtime win. The team from the Soviet Union took the bronze, and the West German team placed fourth. The U.S. men's 1988 silver medal water polo team had not been on an Olympic podium since 1972 when they won a bronze at the Munich Olympic games.

=== International competition ===
From 1981-1988, he played for the US National team. In non-Olympic international competition, he won a gold medal at the 1987 Pan American Games, and the 1987 Goodwill Games, and played with the U.S. team at the 1986 World Championships.

His wife's name is Jeanine with whom he has two children.

=== Professional career ===
Interrupting play with the U.S. National Water Polo team, Mouchawar attended medical school at the University of California, San Diego (UCSD), completing his internship at San Diego's St. Mary's Hospital. Mouchawar began medical school around 1983 and graduated in 1987. To stay competitive in water polo during his medical school attendance, he played for San Diego's Sunset Aquatics, though he did not train intensively. In preparation for the 1988 Olympics, he trained 5–6 hours daily. During his last two years of medical school, he arranged his class attendance so he could have a few months between academics to train, and during his more intensive training he did research in anesthesiology at his medical school at UC-San Diego to stay current in his medical specialty.

After medical school at San Diego State, he did a residency in anesthesiology at U Cal San Francisco and a fellowship in intensive care at Stanford from 1992-93. He has more recently worked at Newport Beach's Hoag Hospital in greater Los Angeles as a cardiac anesthesiologist, and has served in various capacities as a physician for over thirty years.

=== Honors ===
In 2002, he was inducted into the USA Water Polo Hall of Fame. In 2003, he was inducted into the Stanford Athletics Hall of Fame. In 2025, he was honored by the Aquatic Capital of America Hall of Fame for his international achievements, four time achievement as an All American and Olympic silver medal.

== See also ==
- List of Olympic medalists in water polo (men)
