= UC Santa Barbara Gauchos =

Collegiate sports club in the United States

- University: University of California, Santa Barbara
- Nickname: Gauchos
- NCAA: Division I
- Conference: Big West (primary, WCC in 2027); Mountain Pacific Sports Federation (swimming & diving); Independent (men and women's indoor track and field)
- Athletic director: Kelly Barsky
- Location: Santa Barbara, California
- Varsity teams: 19
- Basketball arena: UC Santa Barbara Events Center
- Baseball stadium: Caesar Uyesaka Stadium
- Softball stadium: Campus Diamond
- Soccer stadium: Harder Stadium
- Aquatics center: Campus Pool
- Other venues: Pauley Track; Rec Cen Courts; Robertson Gymnasium
- Colors: Blue and gold
- Mascot: Olé (official); Fantom of the 'Dome (unofficial); Gaucho Joe (unofficial)
- Fight song: "Big 'C'" (official) "Gaucho" (unofficial)
- Website: ucsbgauchos.com

The UC Santa Barbara Gauchos are the intercollegiate athletic teams representing the University of California, Santa Barbara. Referred to in athletic competition as UC Santa Barbara or UCSB, the Gauchos participate in 19 NCAA Division I intercollegiate sports with the majority competing in the Big West Conference. UCSB currently fields varsity teams in 10 men's and 9 women's sports.

Throughout the school's history, UCSB has won team national championships for 1979 men's water polo, 2006 men's soccer and 1962 men's swimming and diving (Div. II). The Gauchos, and the student-athletes who compose the teams, have won a variety of conference titles, regularly compete in NCAA championship events, and have produced professional and Olympic athletes. In the 2024–25 season, they won the Division I-AAA ADA All-Sports Trophy, the trophy for the best non-football university athletic program. They are one of four schools to ever win the award, along with Pepperdine, the University of Denver, and conference rival UC Irvine.

The school has played a pivotal role in the collegiate athletics landscape in California. UCSB was a founding member of the California Collegiate Athletic Association, the Pacific Coast Athletic Association (now known as the Big West Conference), and the Mountain Pacific Sports Federation.

Beginning with the 2027-2028 season, UCSB will rejoin the West Coast Conference, which it was a member of from 1965 to 1969.

== Nickname ==
Those affiliated with UCSB, including alumni, faculty, and students in addition to the athletic teams, have previously gone under the nicknames Hilltoppers and Roadrunners. In September 1934, the student body voted to change the Roadrunners moniker to the Gauchos, which also applied to the athletic teams. Students felt the name more suited the campus's and Santa Barbara, California-area's Spanish architecture, Mission Santa Barbara, and the Gaucho was "essentially Spanish". The school marked the change with a small ceremony of four horse-riders before a football game's kickoff. Later, others attributed the change as inspired by Douglas Fairbanks' role in the eponymous film, The Gaucho.

== History ==
The earliest teams representing UC Santa Barbara, then known as Santa Barbara State Teachers College, appeared in the 1920s with football and basketball followed shortly by baseball.

UCSB was one of four founding members of the California Collegiate Athletic Association, which first took place during the 1938–39 school year. The association sponsored 10 sports and served as a catalyst for UCSB to elevate sports previously classified as "minor" to equal standing as "major", which provided a level playing field for all UCSB-sponsored teams.

In 1969, UC Santa Barbara was a founding member of the Big West Conference, then known as the Pacific Coast Athletic Association.

Along with a consortium of teams from the Big West Conference, Western Athletic Conference, and Pac-10 Conference, UC Santa Barbara was a founding member of the regional Mountain Pacific Sports Federation in 1992.

== Sports sponsored ==
Big West Conference logo in UCSB colors

Men's sports	Women's sports
Baseball	Basketball
Basketball	Cross country
Cross country	Soccer
Golf	Softball
Soccer	Swimming and diving
Swimming and diving	Tennis
Tennis	Track and field^{†}
Track and field	Volleyball
Volleyball	Water polo
Water polo	
† – Track and field includes both indoor and outdoor

=== Baseball ===
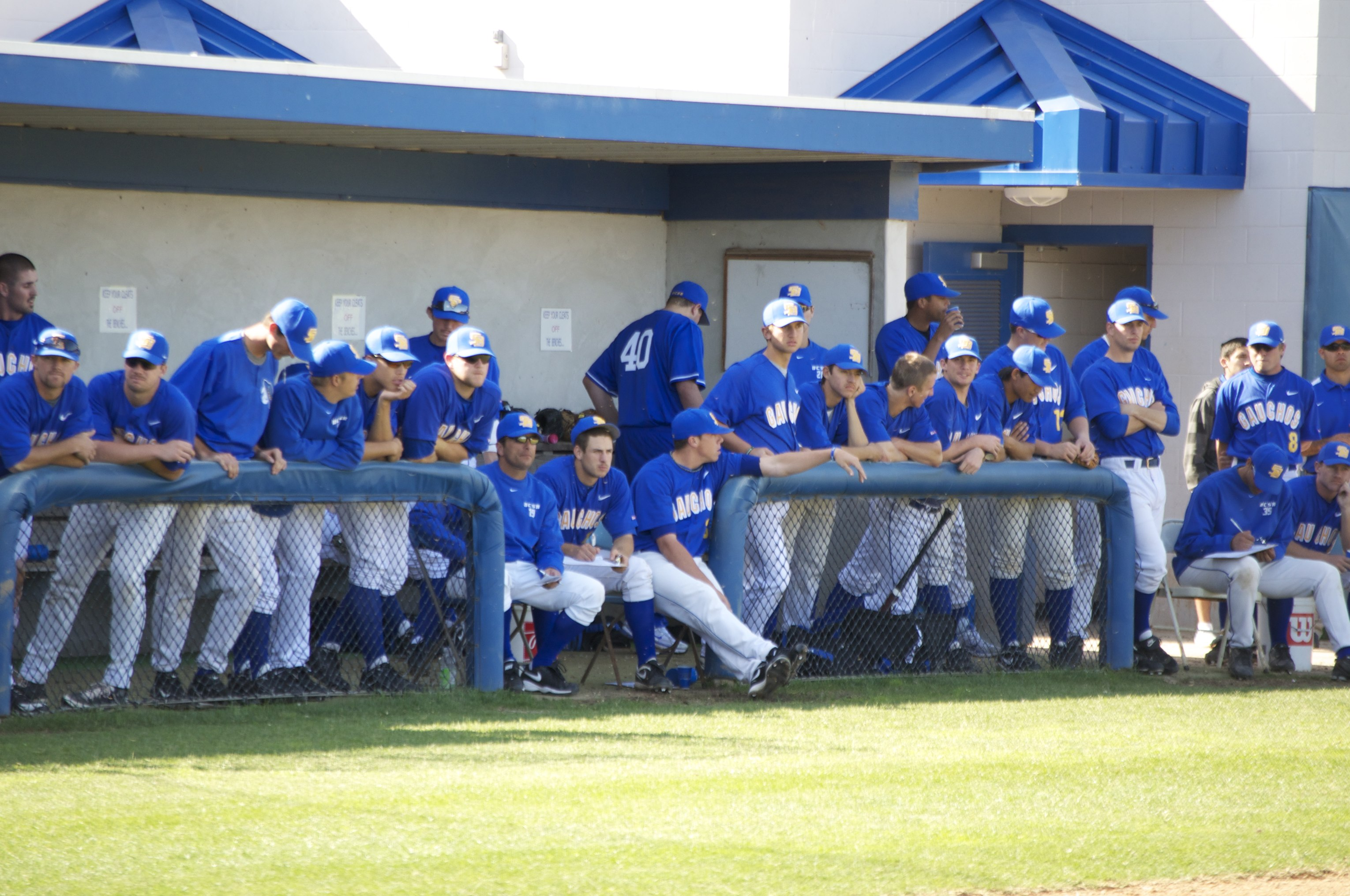
UCSB baseball players in 2010

Potentially one of the oldest teams the Gauchos field, baseball can date back to at least 1922. The first known head coach is Kenneth Bolton, who coached in only the 1922 season before handing the reins to O. J. Gilliland in 1923. The Gauchos have appeared in 13 NCAA Division I baseball tournaments.

Numerous Major League Baseball all-stars and World Series champions have come through the ranks including Shane Bieber, Skip Schumaker, Chris Speier, Michael Young, and Barry Zito.

=== Basketball ===
Both the UCSB men's and women's basketball teams play at the UCSB Events Center, commonly known as the Thunderdome.

==== Men's basketball ====
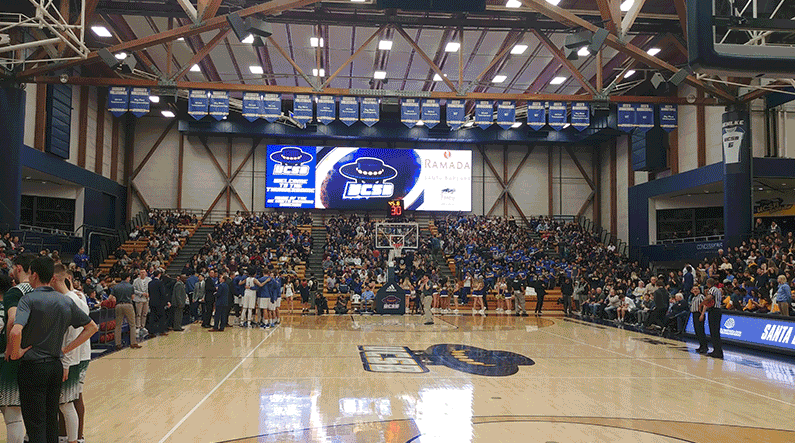
Events Center, home to the men's and women's basketball teams

UCSB Men's Basketball had its best years in the late '80s and early '90s under coach Jerry Pimm, highlighted by a 77–70 victory over then No. 2 and eventual National Champion UNLV in 1990, and NCAA tournament appearances in 1988 (lost to Maryland) and 1990 (defeated Houston 70–66 and lost to Michigan State 62–58). The Gauchos returned to the NCAA tournament in 2002 where they nearly upset powerhouse Arizona in the opening round. Over the years, a few of Pimm's assistants at UCSB have gone on to coach other major programs around the country, including Ben Howland (1982–1994) of UCLA and Jamie Dixon of Pittsburgh.

In the 2009–10 season, UCSB Men's Basketball was the regular season champion and final tournament champion in the Big West Conference, defeating Long Beach State. It won an automatic berth to the NCAA tournament and played 2nd seed Ohio State, losing to the Buckeyes. In 2010–2011, they placed fifth in the regular season. They defeated Long Beach State in the tournament final for the second year in a row. The Gauchos were the lowest seed to win the Big West Tournament since sixth-seeded San Jose State toppled Utah State in 1996. They played the 2nd seed Florida Gators and lost. It was the first time UCSB entered an NCAA Tournament in back-to-back seasons.

Famous Gauchos men's basketball players are Brian Shaw, Conner Henry, Alex Harris, Lucius Davis, Don Ford, James Nunnally, and Orlando Johnson.

==== Women's basketball ====
In 2005, UCSB Women's Basketball won its unprecedented ninth straight Big West Conference Championship. The team had its best year in history during the 2004 season when it advanced to the NCAA Sweet 16 where it lost to eventual champion UConn. UCSB was the only team to hold UConn to less than a double-digit victory in the NCAA playoffs. From 2000 to 2005, Tasha McDowell served as an assistant coach.

In the 2012 Big West Tournament, the UCSB women's basketball team became the first 6th seed to win the tournament. In the first round, the team traveled to UC Irvine and defeated the 3rd-seeded Anteaters 61–51. The Gauchos continued on their playoff march against the Pacific Tigers in the semifinals hosted at the Honda Center in Anaheim, CA. Pacific swept UCSB in the regular season, but the Gauchos were victorious when it mattered the most as they bounced the Tigers out of the tournament with an overwhelming 84-66 decision. The 84-point output currently stands as the most points the Gauchos have scored under head coach Carlene Mitchell. After defeating the number 3 seed and number 5 seed, the Gauchos ended up being the higher-ranked team in the championship game as they were set to face Long Beach State who pulled off two miraculous upsets of their own as the 7 seed. The Gauchos went on to capture its record 14th Big West crown with a 63–54 final tally. Gaucho center Kirsten Tilleman had a double-double (16 points and 11 rebounds) against the 49ers, which earned her the tournament MVP honors. She was also included on the All-Tournament team roster along with her teammate sophomore guard Melissa Zornig, who averaged 16.7 points per game in the tournament. The 2011-2012 Gauchos' season ended in the first round of the NCAA tournament where they fell 81–40 against the eventual national champion Baylor.

Famous Gauchos women's basketball players are Kristen Mann currently plays in the WNBA and Mekia Valentine was drafted by the New York Liberty in the 2011 WNBA draft.

=== Cross country ===
The UC Santa Barbara Gauchos men's cross country team appeared in the NCAA tournament two times, with their highest finish being 17th place in the 2001–02 school year. The UC Santa Barbara Gauchos women's cross country team appeared in the NCAA tournament four times, with their highest finish being 9th place in the 2006–07 school year.

Year	Gender	Ranking	Points
2001	Men	No. 17	432
2003	Women	No. 29	586
2004	Women	No. 17	410
2006	Men	No. 27	553
2006	Women	No. 9	318
2007	Women	No. 19	499

=== Soccer ===
==== Men's soccer ====
In 2004, the UCSB men's soccer team advanced to the College Cup. It routed Duke in the semifinals 5–0, but lost in the championship match to Indiana on penalties

In 2006, UCSB again advanced to the College Cup. In the semi-finals, UCSB and 2nd seed Wake Forest played to a 0–0 tie before UCSB won the game on penalty kicks 4–3. In the championship game, UCSB defeated UCLA 2-1 to win its first NCAA Men's Soccer title and its second NCAA championship (1979 Men's Water Polo) in school history.

In conference play, the Gauchos have dominated Big West competition. They have won the Big West Championship in 5 of the last 7 years. Also, the Gauchos have had no less than 5 former players receive full international caps.

The Gauchos have led the NCAA in attendance each year from 2007 to 2012 and averaged 5,873 fans during their 2010 home matches. The Gauchos Sep. 24, 2010 match against UCLA drew 15,896 fans, the highest attendance for an NCAA soccer match since the year 2000.

The UC Santa Barbara Gauchos men's soccer team has an NCAA Division I Tournament record of 23–13–1 through sixteen appearances.

Year	Round	Opponent	Result
2002	First round Second Round	San Diego; California	W 2–0; L 1–2
2003	Second Round; Third round	California; St. John's	W 2–0; L 2–3
2004	Second Round; Third round Quarterfinals; Semifinals; National Championship	Milwaukee; UNC Greensboro; VCU; Duke; Indiana	W 2–1; W 1–0; W 4–1; W 5–0; L 1–2
2005	First round Second Round	San Diego State; CSU Northridge	W 2–0; L 2–3
2006	First round Second Round; Third round Quarterfinals; Semifinals; National Championship	San Diego State; SMU; Old Dominion; Northwestern; Wake Forest; UCLA	W 2–1; W 3–1; W 2–1; W 3–2; W 1–0; W 2–1
2007	Second Round; Third round	Washington; Ohio State	W 1–0; L 3–4
2008	Second Round	California	L 2–3
2009	First round Second Round; Third round	Wofford; San Diego; UCLA	W 1–0; W 1–0; L 1–2
2010	First round Second Round	Denver; California	W 1–0; L 1–2
2011	Second Round; Third round	Providence; Creighton	W 3–2; L 1–2
2013	Second Round	Penn State	L 0–1
2015	Second Round; Third round	South Carolina; Clemson	W 1–0; L 2–3
2019	First round Second round Third round Quarterfinals	California; Saint Mary's; Indiana; Wake Forest	W 3–1; W 4–0; W 1–0; L 0–1
2021	First round	UCLA	L 1–2
2024	First round Second round	UCLA; Stanford	W 1–0; D 2–2 (L 6–5 on PKs)

==== Women's soccer ====
The UC Santa Barbara Gauchos women's soccer team has an NCAA Division I Tournament record of 5–9 through nine appearances.

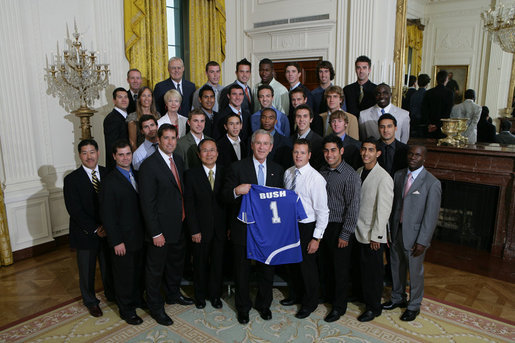
2006 NCAA soccer champions visit President George W. Bush at the White House

Year	Round	Opponent	Result
1984	First round	California	L 0–2
1985	First round Second Round	CSU East Bay; Colorado College	W 4–3; L 0–3
1986	First round Second Round	Cincinnati; North Carolina	W 1–0; L 0–8
1987	First round Second Round	Colorado College; California	W 1–0; L 0–3
1989	First round Second Round	Wisconsin; Santa Clara	W 1–0; L 0–2
1990	First round Second Round	Stanford; Santa Clara	W 1–0; L 0–2
1991	First round	Hartford	L 0–4
2008	First round	Stanford	L 0–2
2009	First round	BYU	L 0–2

=== Softball ===
The UC Santa Barbara Gauchos women's softball team has an NCAA Division I Tournament record of 2–8 through four appearances. The Gauchos won their first NCAA tournament game in 2025.

Year	Record	Win Percentage	Notes
2004	0–2	.000	Eliminated by Temple in No. 1 Regional
2006	0–2	.000	Eliminated by Southern Illinois in Evanston Regional
2007	0–2	.000	Eliminated by Loyola Marymount in Los Angeles Regional
2025	2–2	.500	Eliminated by UCLA in Los Angeles Regional

=== Swimming ===
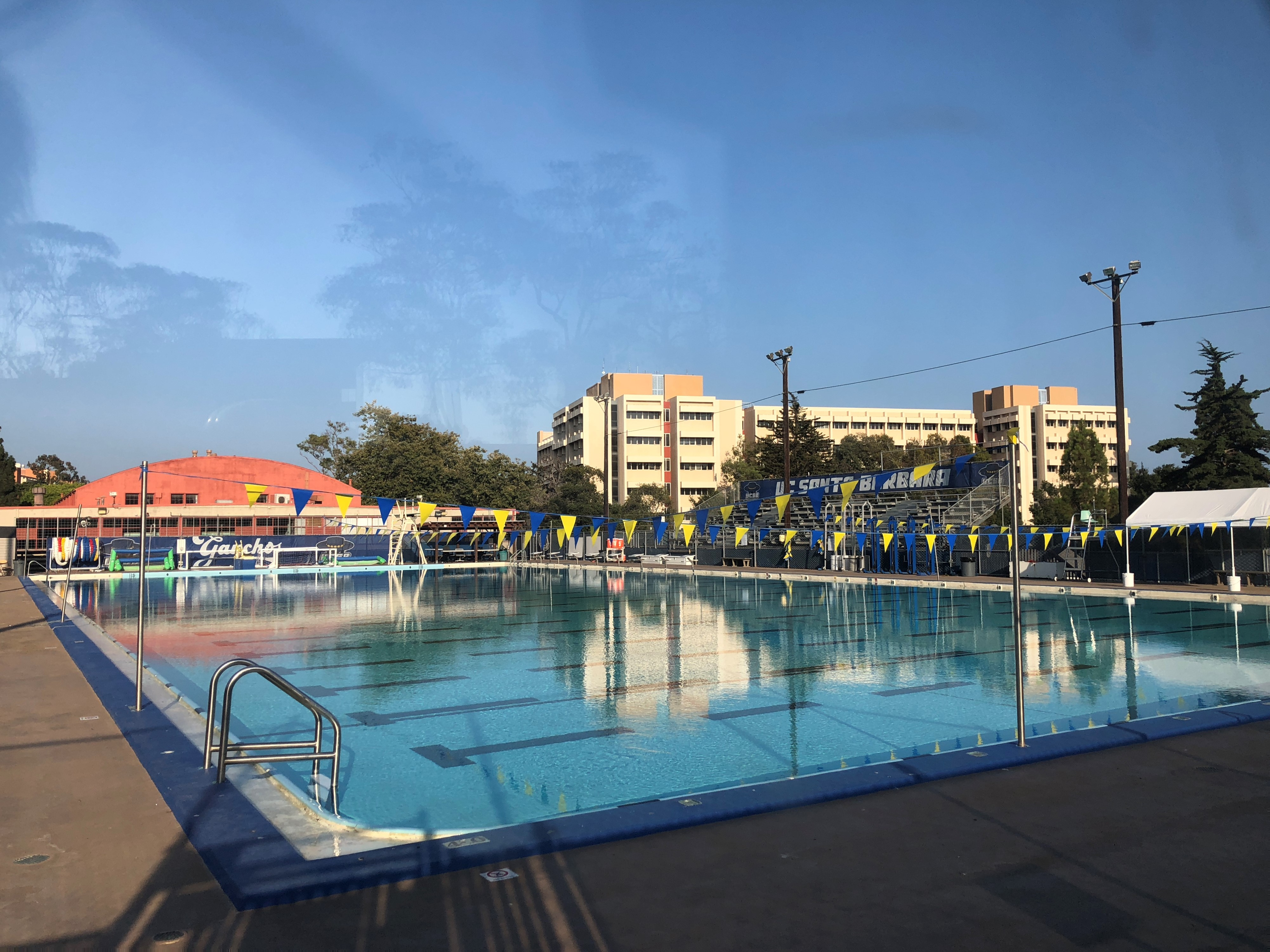
Swimming at Campus Pool

Based out of Campus Pool on the UCSB campus, the swimming program has seen its fair share of success. For 40 seasons Gregg Wilson was the head coach of the men's and women's swimming teams. Wilson posted a dual meet record of 292–208–1 (172–115 with the men, 120–92–1 with the women). Even more impressive, his squads have collected 36 Big West Conference Championships, 23 by his men's teams and 13 by his women's teams. Before the Texas Longhorns men's swim team broke it, the UCSB men's swim team set the NCAA record for most consecutive conference titles in any sport with 23 straight Big West Conference championships from 1979 to 2001. The men's teams have been ranked as high as 16th nationally and several of his swimmers over the years have advanced to the NCAA Championships. The men's team has turned in 38 All-American performances under Wilson.

The team is now led by Coach Matt Macedo, who took over the position in August 2016 (was an assistant coach for two years prior). The men's team earned back-to-back championship titles at the Mountain Pacific Sports Federation championship (MPSF) in 2017 and 2018, while Macedo also earned the coach of the year award in his first year.

Notable alumni of the program include Olympic gold medalists Richard Schroeder, Jason Lezak, Sandy Neilson, Sophie Kamoun, former 50-meter freestyle world record holder Bruce Stahl (the first person to ever hold this world record), and Pat Cary.

=== Volleyball ===
==== Men's volleyball ====
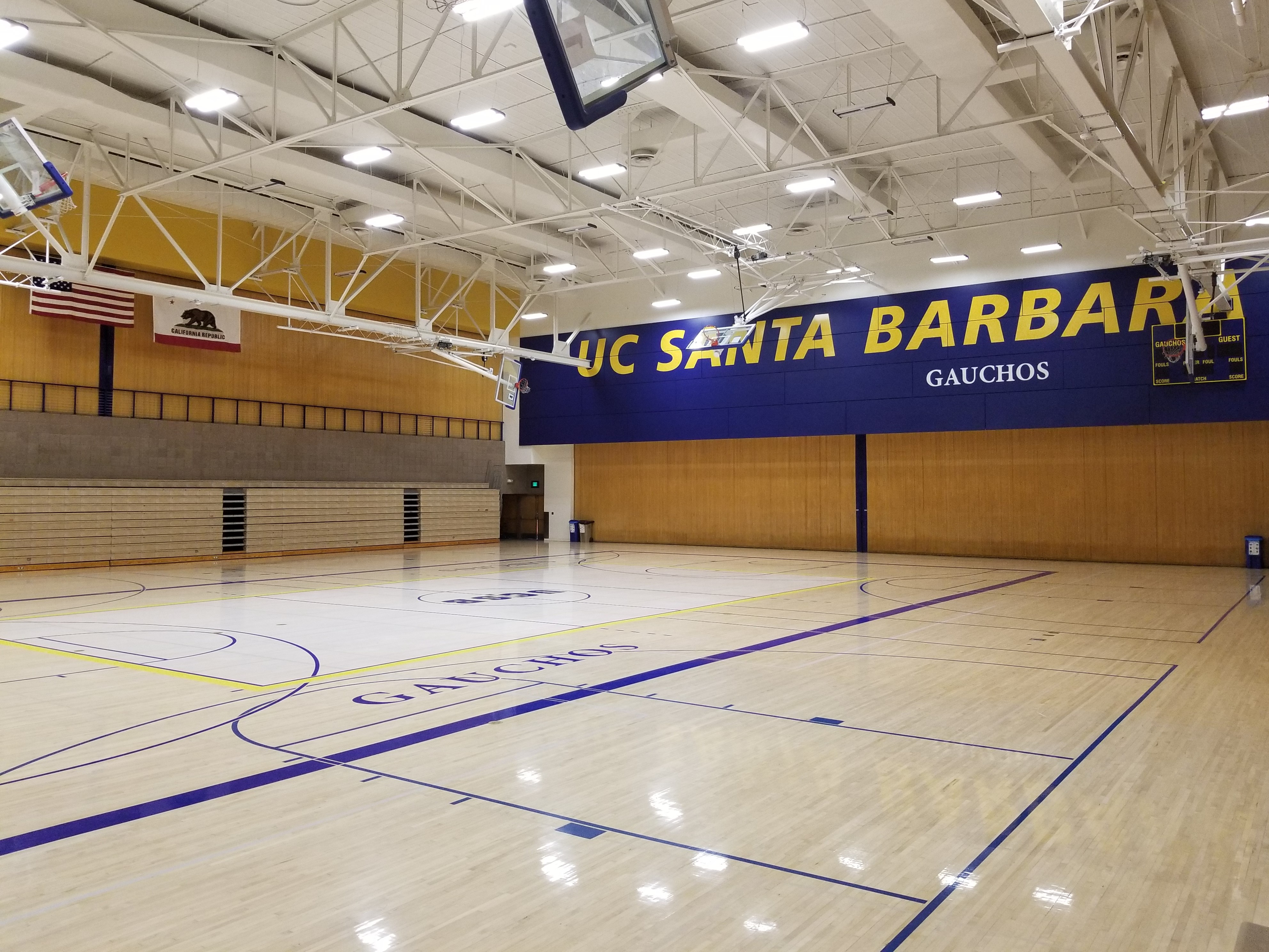
Robertson Gymnasium, venue

The men's volleyball team has finished as the NCAA runner-up five times, most recently in 2011. The women's volleyball team plays at the UCSB Events Center, while the men's team plays at Robertson Gymnasium.

==== Women's volleyball ====
The UC Santa Barbara Gauchos women's volleyball team has an NCAA Division I Tournament record of 21–28 through twenty-eight appearances.

Year	Round	Opponent	Result
1981	Regional semifinals Regional Finals	BYU; San Diego State	W 3–2; L 0–3
1982	First round	San Jose State	L 2–3
1983	First round Regional semifinals	Northwestern; Cal Poly	W 3–0; L 2–3
1984	First round	Fresno State	L 1–3
1985	First round	Cal Poly	L 2–3
1986	First round	San Diego State	L 1–3
1987	First round	Cal Poly	L 1–3
1988	First round	Pacific	L 0–3
1989	First round	Cal Poly	L 2–3
1990	First round Regional semifinals	Idaho State; Pacific	W 3–0; L 0–3
1991	First round Regional semifinals	Fresno State; Long Beach State	W 3–0; L 1–3
1992	First round Regional semifinals	Idaho; Pacific	W 3–0; L 1–3
1993	Second Round	Minnesota	L 2–3
1994	First round Second Round	Princeton; Pacific	W 3–0; L 2–3
1995	First round Second Round	South Florida; Arizona State	W 3–0; L 2–3
1996	First round Second Round	Northern Illinois; Loyola Marymount	W 3–2; L 1–3
1997	Second Round; Regional semifinals Regional Finals	UCLA; Texas; Stanford	W 3–2; W 3–0; L 0–3
1998	First round Second Round; Regional semifinals	Santa Clara; UCLA; Wisconsin	W 3–0; W 3–1; L 2–3
1999	First round Second Round; Regional semifinals Regional Finals	Oral Roberts; Loyola Marymount; Nebraska; Stanford	W 3–0; W 3–1; W 3–1; L 0–3
2000	First round Second Round; Regional semifinals Regional Finals	UTSA; Stanford; Minnesota; Hawaii	W 3–0; W 3–2; W 3–1; L 1–3
2001	First round	San Diego	L 2–3
2002	First round Second Round; Regional semifinals	Fresno State; California; Pepperdine	W 3–1; W 3–0; L 1–3
2003	First round	Northern Iowa	L 2–3
2004	First round Second Round	Alabama A&M; Georgia Tech	W 3–0; L 0–3
2005	First round	USC	L 1–3
2006	First round	BYU	L 2–3
2009	First round	Saint Mary's	L 2–3
2013	First round	San Diego	L 0–3

=== Men's water polo ===
UC Santa Barbara won the 1979 National Championship in men's water polo, defeating the UCLA Bruins by a score of 11–3. This was UCSB's first-ever NCAA Division I championship. The program has produced several notable players including Craig Wilson, Greg Boyer, John Anderson, Brian Alexander, and Ross Sinclair, who have won multiple Olympic medals between the group. The current head coach is three-time Olympian and former United States men's national water polo team captain Wolf Wigo, who also oversees the UCSB women's water polo program.

The UC Santa Barbara Gauchos men's water polo team has an NCAA Division I Tournament record of 7–11 through twelve appearances.

Year	Round	Opponent	Result
1969	First round Semifinals	Colorado State; California	W 7–3; L 4–6
1970	First round	UCLA	L 6–7
1972	First round	UC Irvine	L 12–16
1973	First round	UCLA	L 2–14
1974	First round	UC Irvine	L 6–10
1976	First round Semifinals	Loyola (IL); Stanford	W 13–5; L 6–7
1979	First round Semifinals; National Championship	Loyola (IL); Stanford; UCLA	W 21–4; W 10–9; W 11–3
1980	First round	California	L 7–11
1981	First round	UC Irvine	L 8–9
1982	First round	UCLA	L 6–8
1985	First round Semifinals	Long Beach State; Stanford	W 7–6; L 6–7
1990	First round Semifinals	Navy; Stanford	W 16–9; L 7–9

== Former varsity sports ==
=== Football ===
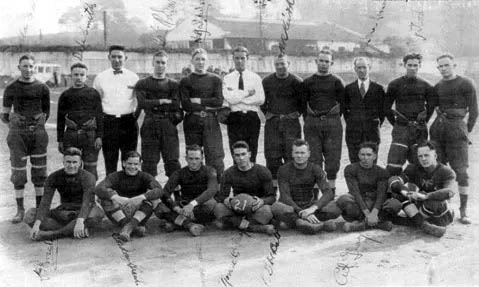
The first football team fielded by the Barbara State Teachers College in 1921

UCSB began playing intercollegiate football in 1921, playing as the "Roadrunners" on a field at Pershing Park. Theodore "Spud" Harder became coach in 1934; in the same year, the school adopted a new name, selecting "Gauchos" in a student vote. The 1936 team finished with a 9–1 record, the best in school history, and two of its members later played for the NFL's New York Giants.

La Playa Stadium, now used by Santa Barbara City College, opened in 1938 and was the team's home until 1966, when Harder Stadium was built.

"Cactus Jack" Curtice, who had been head coach at several major college programs, coached the team from 1963 to 1969. His 1965 team finished 8-1 and went to the Camellia Bowl. Under Curtice's successor, Andy Everest, the college decided to launch an NCAA Division I program, but after two seasons of dismal on-field performance and a lack of student support, the college changed directions and decided to drop the sport entirely in December 1971 after falling $40,000 below its estimated operating budget.

The Gauchos appeared in four bowl games during 50 years, winning only once, in the 1948 Potato Bowl.

==== UCSB football Division I era significant events ====
- In 1930, UCSB finished 6–1–1. Overall, the team outscored its opponents 97–51 for the season.
- In 1936, the Gauchos finished the season with a record of 9–1, including 4–1 in the SCIAC, with the only blemish a one-point loss to league champion San Diego State. Overall, the team outscored its opponents 223–43 for the season. The Gauchos had five shutouts and held the other team to a touchdown or less in 8 of 10 games.
- In 1948, UCSB finished the season 6–5, including 2–3 in the CCAA. At the end of the season, the Gauchos played in the first Potato Bowl, in Bakersfield, California. (Note: The Potato Bowl was played as a charity benefit in Bakersfield from 1948–1967. In later years, instead of four-year institutions it was played between Junior College teams. This Bowl game has no relation to the Famous Idaho Potato Bowl which was founded in 1997.) The Gauchos were Potato Bowl Champions versus Willamette University, 46–7.
- In 1950, the Gauchos finished 7–3 overall and 3–1 in the CCAA.
- In 1952, UCSB went 8–2 overall and 3–1 against the CCAA.
- In 1956, the Gauchos finished the season 5–5 overall and 1–1 in the CCAA. The Gauchos accepted an invitation to play in a charity bowl game. The game was the first and only Citricado Bowl, played at Escondido High School in Escondido, California against a military team from Marine Corps Recruit Depot San Diego, which they lost 25–16 to the San Diego Marines.
- In 1957, the Gauchos finished the season with a record of 6–2 overall, including 1–1 in the CCAA.
- In 1964, UCSB went 4–7. For the season, they were outscored by their opponents 164–152. They played in an unsanctioned Aztec Bowl in Mexico City against a Mexican All-Star Team and lost 20–7.
- In 1965, the Gauchos finished the regular season 8–1. At the end of the season, the Gauchos qualified for a postseason bowl game, the 1965 Camellia Bowl, played in Sacramento, California. They lost the game against Cal State Los Angeles 18–10. That brought their final record to 8–2. For the 1965 season, they outscored their opponents 225–95. Jack Curtice won the AFCA Coach of the Year in Division II.

===== Brief revival at Division III and Division II levels =====
- A student-run club team started play in 1983, and in 1985 a student referendum approved funding for a Division III, non-scholarship team on a $65,000 budget. The team began play in 1987 and enjoyed some success on the field, with a 33–15 record from 1987 to 1991.
- In 1987, the Gauchos competed as a Division III football independent and compiled a record of 8–2, and outscored their opponents 237–107.
- In 1989, led by Mike Warren in his fourth and final season as head coach, the Gauchos compiled a record of 8–2 and outscored their opponents 313–150. The team again played as a D-III independent. Looming NCAA legislation, however, mandated that universities' athletic programs must all compete at the same divisional level. Warren finished his four-year stint as head coach with a record of 26–13 for a winning percentage of .667.
- In 1991, UCSB football moved up to Division II, with students paying $1 per quarter to generate a budget of $80,000 for the team. However, soon after in 1992, the NCAA decided to officially forbid schools playing in Division I in other sports from maintaining a lower-level football program, and UCSB dropped the sport again. The final outcome came in February 1992, as students voted by a margin of 54.1 percent (3,644) to 45.9 percent (3,089) against implementing a potential $9-per-quarter fee increase which would've enabled the football team to play at the Division I-AA (today known as FCS) level.

==== National Awards ====
- Jack Curtice won the AFCA Coach of the Year for the 1965 NCAA football season in NCAA Division II.
- Jack Curtice also won the Amos Alonzo Stagg Award for the 1972 NCAA football season.

==== Bowl Games ====
- 1948 Potato Bowl - Bakersfield, CA vs. Willamette University, 46-7 Win
- 1956 Citricado Bowl - San Diego, CA vs. San Diego Marines, 16-7 Loss
- 1964 Aztec Bowl - Mexico City, CD, MX vs. Mexican All-Stars, 7-20 Loss
- 1965 Camellia Bowl - Sacramento, CA vs. Cal State LA (College Division N0. 4 ranked), 10-18 Loss

==== Rivalries ====
- Cal Poly

"Blue-Green Rivalry"

The Mustangs won the football rivalry 21-14, at a total of 35 games that were played between 1923 and 1971.

- San Diego State

In this 'Southern California Coastal Beach Town Rivalry' the Gauchos lost to 2 ranked Aztec teams in 1964 (SDSU NO.4) and 1970 (SDSU No.14). San Diego State Aztecs won the football rivalry 26-8-1 games, at a total of 35 games that were played between 1923 and 1971.

- UC Davis

In this 'Little UC- School Rivalry' The 2 UC schools' rivalry mirrors their older, larger 'UC brothers' (UC-Berkeley–UCLA Rivalry) in this Southern vs. Northern California UC School Rivalry. The Gauchos won the football rivalry 14-6-2 games, at a total of 22 games that were played between 1938 and 1965.

- Whittier College

This Local So. Cal Rivalry with the campuses approximately 120 miles apart from each other ran for 57 years on the gridiron. It is the longest running Rivalry years wise in UCSB football history. Whittier College Poets won the football rivalry 17-15-1 games, at a total of 33 games that were played between 1930 and 1987.

- Occidental College

Only 95 miles separate the 2 college campuses. In this Local So. Cal Rivalry the Occidental Tigers won the football rivalry 16-11-2 games, at a total of 29 games that were played between 1927 and 1961.

== Non-varsity club sports ==
Numerous UC Santa Barbara athletic teams compete intercollegiately at the student club level without official sanction or sponsorship from the university's Athletic Department. While there are 450 students-athletes in ICA, there are over 700 in club (recreational) sports teams. Many of these teams are highly regarded and compete against intercollegiate teams across the United States. The Women's Water Polo team captured two Collegiate Club titles, in 1987 and 1989. The Rowing Team is the current National Champion for the second consecutive year (American Collegiate Rowing Association) and the Women's Team point Champion (2015).

The following teams compete in intercollegiate non-varsity club sports:

Men's sports	Women's sports	Co-ed sports
Baseball	Lacrosse	Cheer
Lacrosse	Rowing	Climbing
Rowing	Rugby	Cycling
Rugby	Soccer	Dance
Soccer	Ultimate frisbee	Fencing
Ultimate frisbee	Volleyball	Field hockey
Volleyball	Water polo	Ice hockey
Water polo		Roller hockey
		Sailing
		Surf
		Tennis
		Triathlon
		Weightlifting
		Wrestling
UC Santa Barbara Gauchos intercollegiate non-varsity club sports

=== Lacrosse ===
UC Santa Barbara men's lacrosse started in 1969 and has competed in the Western Collegiate Lacrosse League (WCLL) from 1980 to 2009 and 2019-present, holding the record for most conference championships in the WCLL at 11 (1980, 1983, 1984, 1987, 2003, 2004, 2005, 2007, 2023, 2024, 2025). They also competed in the Southwestern Lacrosse Conference from 2010 to 2018. They won the Men's Collegiate Lacrosse Association (MCLA) national championship twice (2004 and 2005) and rank in the top 5 programs in history for both national championships won and national championship finals appearances.

=== Rowing ===
Rowing was started in 1965 as the first club sport at UC Santa Barbara, predating some of the university's intercollegiate athletic teams. It was followed in 1972 by a women's side. The Gauchos compete in the American Collegiate Rowing Association, where they've won numerous national championships. The program has produced Olympic Games and national team members such as Amy Fuller.

=== Rugby ===
UC Santa Barbara previously played host to the Santa Barbara International Rugby Tournament, once the largest rugby tournament in the world which drew teams locally and internationally. UCSB has produced several top rugby players, including international team members Bill Leversee, Stuart Krohn, and Kristine Sommer. Others went on to success in other sports, such as Doug Oldershaw.

=== Surf ===
UC Santa Barbara and its campus is widely considered to be one of the top 5 "surf schools". The Gauchos compete in the National Scholastic Surfing Association. Since the organization's creation in 1978, UCSB has been the most successful collegiate program in history and has won 13 collegiate national championship trophies, the last coming in 2010.

=== Ultimate frisbee ===
The Black Tide (men's team) and the Burning Skirts (women's team) are consistently top teams in the nation. The Black Tide is the most successful men's collegiate ultimate frisbee team in history and has won six national championships (1988, 1989, 1990, 1996, 1997, 1998) through USA Ultimate's college championships. It's also the only men's team to win back-to-back-to-back championships, which it accomplished twice. The Burning Skirts have won five national championships (1988, 1990, 1991, 2009, 2011), one of only three teams to have ever won back-to-back championships.

== Championships ==
=== Appearances ===
The UC Santa Barbara Gauchos competed in the NCAA tournament across 20 active sports (10 men's and 10 women's) 184 times at the Division I level.

- Baseball (11): 1972, 1983, 1986, 1987, 1990, 1996, 2001, 2013, 2015, 2016, 2019
- Men's basketball (7): 1988, 1990, 2002, 2010, 2011, 2021, 2023
- Women's basketball (14): 1992, 1993, 1997, 1998, 1999, 2000, 2001, 2002, 2003, 2004, 2005, 2008, 2009, 2012
- Men's cross country (2): 2001, 2006
- Women's cross country (4): 2003, 2004, 2006, 2007
- Men's golf (2): 1994, 1998
- Men's soccer (13): 2002, 2003, 2004, 2005, 2006, 2007, 2008, 2009, 2010, 2011, 2013, 2015, 2019
- Women's soccer (9): 1984, 1985, 1986, 1987, 1989, 1990, 1991, 2008, 2009
- Softball (3): 2004, 2006, 2007
- Men's swimming and diving (22): 1965, 1966, 1967, 1968, 1972, 1980, 1981, 1982, 1983, 1984, 1985, 1987, 1990, 1991, 1992, 1994, 1995, 1997, 1998, 1999, 2006, 2007
- Women's swimming and diving (9): 1982, 1986, 1987, 1988, 1989, 1990, 2008, 2009, 2014
- Men's tennis (14): 1996, 1997, 1998, 2002, 2003, 2006, 2007, 2008, 2009, 2013, 2015, 2016, 2017, 2018, 2019
- Women's tennis (4): 1994, 1996, 2016, 2017
- Women's indoor track and field (2): 2012, 2019
- Men's outdoor track and field (13): 1948, 1949, 1950, 1956, 1960, 1973, 1983, 1984, 1991, 2007, 2010, 2011, 2012
- Women's outdoor track and field (7): 1984, 2003, 2006, 2007, 2010, 2012, 2019
- Men's volleyball (7): 1970, 1971, 1972, 1974, 1975, 1988, 2011
- Women's volleyball (29): 1981, 1982, 1983, 1984, 1985, 1986, 1987, 1988, 1989, 1990, 1991, 1992, 1993, 1994, 1995, 1996, 1997, 1998, 1999, 2000, 2001, 2002, 2003, 2004, 2005, 2006, 2009, 2013, 2019
- Men's water polo (12): 1969, 1970, 1972, 1973, 1974, 1976, 1979, 1980, 1981, 1982, 1985, 1990
- Women's water polo (1): 2016

=== Team ===
The Gauchos of UC Santa Barbara earned 2 NCAA championships at the Division I level.

- Men's (2)
  - Soccer (1): 2006
  - Water polo (1): 1979

Results

School year	Sport	Opponent	Score
1979–80	Men's water polo	UCLA	11–3
2006–07	Men's soccer	UCLA	2–1

UC Santa Barbara won 1 national championship at the NCAA Division II level.

- Men's swimming and diving: 1967

Below are twenty-eight national club team championships:

- Co-ed cycling (1): 1988 (USA Cycling)
- Co-ed sailing (1): 1984 (ICSA)
- Co-ed surfing (13): 1984, 1985, 1986, 1988, 1991, 1992, 1994, 1996, 1998, 2002, 2005, 2008, 2010 (NSSA)
- Men's ultimate (6): 1988, 1989, 1990, 1996, 1997, 1998 (USA Ultimate)
- Men's lacrosse (2): 2004, 2005 (MCLA)
- Women's ultimate (5): 1988, 1990, 1991, 2009, 2011 (USA Ultimate)

=== Individual ===
UC Santa Barbara had 1 Gaucho win an NCAA individual championship at the Division I level.

NCAA individual championships
Order	School year	Athlete(s)	Sport	Source
1	1965–66	Don Roth	Men's swimming and diving	

At the NCAA Division II level, UC Santa Barbara garnered 12 individual championships.

== National Award Winners ==
Corbett Award
Year	Name	Position
2003	Gary Cunningham	Athletic Director

== Traditions ==
=== Mascot ===
The official mascot of the UC Santa Barbara is Olé. In September 1934, the student body voted to change the Roadrunners moniker to the Gauchos, which also applied to the athletic teams. The mascot, Olé, is the costumed mascot representing the "Gauchos" nickname.

=== School colors ===
The school colors are "Pacific Blue" (Pantone 286) and "Gaucho Gold" (Pantone 130), with the occasional accent of "Navy Blue" (Pantone 275). In 2009, the program transformed, giving UCSB a new brand and visual identity. As a result, the UCSB athletic program released new logos, different colors, and a unified theme across all teams.

== Rivalries ==
=== The Blue-Green rivalry ===
The main rival of UC Santa Barbara is the Cal Poly Mustangs who compete together in the Blue–Green Rivalry. The Blue-Green Rivalry, which started in November 1921 with a football game, was formalized in 2009. This new format calculates earned points between UCSB and Cal Poly to determine a winner based on their teams' competitive results against each other. Additionally, collegesoccernews.com ranked UC Santa Barbara vs. Cal Poly as the Greatest Rivalry in College Soccer.

=== The Beach Schools Rivalry ===
UC Santa Barbara also has a long-standing "Beach School" rivalry with Long Beach State.

== UCSB Intercollegiate Athletics Hall of Fame ==
The UCSB Gauchos Intercollegiate Athletics Hall of Fame was announced on December 8, 1959. During the construction of Robertson Gymnasium, plans were in place to establish a Hall of Fame located in the new gymnasium. Following the completion of Rob Gym, the inaugural class was announced as C. James Anderson, Sam Cathcart, Tom Guerrero, Doug Oldershaw, Ernie Saenz, and Howard Yeager.

Sport	Hall of Fame members
Teams	1965 Football, 1967 Men's Swimming, 1972–74 UCSB Women's Volleyball, 1974 Men's Volleyball, 1979 Men's Water Polo, 2004 Men's Soccer, 2006 Men's Soccer
Multi-sport members	C. James Anderson, Sam Cathcart, Bill Davis, Earl Engman, David Gorrie, Dave Gray, Jay Hanseth, Donald Hart, David Hendrickson, David Hengsteler, Donald Kelliher, Bill McArthur, Murt Miller, Bob Morelli, Johnny Morris, Dan Mulock, Patrick Joseph O'Brien, Doug Oldershaw, John Osborne, Mel Patton, William Russell, Ernie Saenz, Otey Scruggs, Robert Sherman, Lowell Steward, Peter Walski, Cy Williams, Howie Yeager, Albert Young
Baseball	Jeff Antoon, Scott Cerny, Dick David, Al Ferrer (coach), Jack Fitzgerald, Jim Fitzgerald, Bill Geivett, Erik Johnson, Ed Markham, Steve Ross, Jerrold Rountree, John Schroeder, Brad Shames, Robert Stansbury, Dan Yokubaitis, Michael Young
Men's basketball	Richard Anderson, Ralph Barkey, Larry Brewster, Ignacio Caudillo, Lucius Davis, Carrick DeHart, Scott Fisher, Art Gallon (coach), Tom Guerrero, Harvey Hubler, Eric McArthur, Robert McCutcheon, James O'Hara, Jerry Pimm (coach), Doug Rex, Brian Shaw, Quentin Sims, John Tschogl, Buddy White, Thomas Williams, Willie Wilton (coach)
Women's basketball	Erin Alexander, Barbara Beainy, Cori Close, Mark French (coach), Christa Gannon, Amy Smith, Lindsay Taylor
Boxing	Robert Garcia
Fencing	Gay Jacobsen D'Asaro, Sidney Getzovitz
Football	Corky Barrett, Tom Broadhead, David Chapple, Jack Curtice (coach), Jim Curtice, Spud Harder (coach), Mike Hitchman, Howard Johnson, Rich Kezirian, Larry Pickens, Sut Puailoa, Ray Schaack, Jim St. Clair, Amahl Thomas, Fred Tunnicliffe, Paul Vallerga, Bart Weitzenberg
Men's golf	Dave Barber, Robert Clancy
Men's soccer	Bruce Fisher, Rob Friend
Women's soccer	Lisa Busch, Laurie Hill, Carin Jennings-Gabarra, Karen Nance
Softball	Sandy Ortgies
Men's swimming	Paul Goodridge, Jason Lezak, Ken Neff, Don Roth, Richard Schroeder, Bruce Stahl
Women's swimming	Kim Bryson, Marcie Fuller, Sandy Neilson
Men's tennis	Wayne Bryan, Don Gaynor, O. Lee Reid
Women's tennis	Debbie Goldberger, Tracie Johnstone, Jean Okada, Kelly Spencer, Amelia White
Men's track and field	Sam Adams (coach), Hovis Bess, Nick Carter (coach), Clark J. Chelsey, Bill Collins, Colman Conroy, Willie Dancer, Jerry Durfee, Jay Elbel, Phil Kirkpatrick, Gordon McClenathen, Delf Pickarts, Jim Pryde, Andy Sheaffer, John Tobin
Men's volleyball	Eric Fonoimoana, Jose Gandara, Mike Gorman, Jared Huffman, Todd Rogers, David Rottman, Dave Shoji
Women's volleyball	Judy Bellomo, Roberta Gehlke, Charlotte Mitchel
Men's water polo	Greg Boyer, John Dobrott, Benjamin Gage, Larry Mouchawar, Pete Snyder (coach), John Steckel, Craig Wilson
Other individuals	Donn Bernstein, Harry Callihan, Philip Patton, Phil Womble
