= 1970 NCAA Men's Water Polo Championship =

Water polo tournament season

Tournament details
- Dates: December 1970
- Teams: 8

Final positions
- Champions: UC Irvine (1st title)
- Runners-up: UCLA (2nd title game)
- Third place: Long Beach State
- Fourth place: San José State

Tournament statistics
- Matches played: 12
- Goals scored: 182 (15.17 per match)
- Top goal scorer(s): Ben Gage, UCSB (17)

The 1970 NCAA Men's Water Polo Championship was the second annual NCAA Men's Water Polo Championship to determine the national champion of NCAA men's college water polo. Tournament matches were played at the Belmont Plaza Pool in Long Beach, California during December 1970.

UC Irvine defeated UCLA in the final, 7–6 (in three overtimes), to win their first championship. UCLA was the defending national champion.

For the second consecutive year, the leading scorer for the tournament was Ben Gage from UC Santa Barbara (17 goals). The awards for All-Tournament Team and Most Outstanding Player were not given out until 1972.

== Qualification ==
Since there has only ever been one single national championship for water polo, all NCAA men's water polo programs (whether from Division I, Division II, or Division III) were eligible. A total of 8 teams were invited to contest this championship.

| Team | Appearance | Previous |
|---|---|---|
| Colorado State | 2nd | 1969 |
| Long Beach State | 2nd | 1969 |
| San José State | 1st | Never |
| Stanford | 1st | Never |
| UC Irvine | 2nd | 1969 |
| UCLA | 2nd | 1969 |
| UC Santa Barbara | 2nd | 1969 |
| USC | 2nd | 1969 |

== Bracket ==
- Site: Belmont Plaza Pool, Long Beach, California

Fifth place
Stanford | 7
USC | 10
Seventh place
UC Santa Barbara | 9
Colorado State | 4

Consolation semifinals
UC Santa Barbara | 11
Stanford (3OT) | 12
Colorado State | 6
USC | 7

First round
UCLA | 7
UC Santa Barbara | 6
San José State | 9
Stanford | 7
Long Beach State | 9
Colorado State | 7
UC Irvine | 7
USC | 4

Championship semifinals
UCLA | 7
San José State | 4
Long Beach State | 6
UC Irvine | 9

Championship
UCLA | 6
UC Irvine (3OT) | 7
Third place
San José State | 10
Long Beach State (3OT) | 11

== See also ==
- NCAA Men's Water Polo Championship
