= 1971 NCAA Men's Water Polo Championship =

Water polo tournament season

Tournament details
- Dates: December 1971
- Teams: 8

Final positions
- Champions: UCLA (2nd title)
- Runners-up: San José State (1st title game)
- Third place: Cal State Fullerton
- Fourth place: Long Beach State

Tournament statistics
- Matches played: 12
- Goals scored: 200 (16.67 per match)
- Top goal scorer(s): Jim Waska, CSUF (14)

The 1971 NCAA Men's Water Polo Championship was the third annual NCAA Men's Water Polo Championship to determine the national champion of NCAA men's college water polo. Tournament matches were played at the Belmont Plaza Pool in Long Beach, California during December 1971.

UCLA defeated San José State in the final, 5–3, to win their second national title.

The leading scorer for the tournament was Jim Waska from Cal State Fullerton (14 goals). The awards for All-Tournament Team and Most Outstanding Player were not given out until 1972.

== Qualification ==
Since there has only ever been one single national championship for water polo, all NCAA men's water polo programs (whether from Division I, Division II, or Division III) were eligible. A total of 8 teams were invited to contest this championship.

Team	Appearance	Previous
Cal State Fullerton	1st	Never
Long Beach State	3rd	1970
New Mexico	1st	Never
San José State	2nd	1970
Stanford	2nd	1970
UC Irvine	3rd	1970
UCLA	3rd	1970
Washington	1st	Never

== Bracket ==
- Site: Belmont Plaza Pool, Long Beach, California

Fifth place
New Mexico	3
Stanford	5
Seventh place
Washington	5
UC Irvine	18

Consolation semifinals
Washington	4
New Mexico	13
UC Irvine	7
Stanford	8

First round
UCLA	37
Washington	2
Long Beach State	13
New Mexico	8
Cal State Fullerton	5
UC Irvine	4
San José State	10
Stanford	4

Championship semifinals
UCLA	10
Long Beach State	1
Cal State Fullerton	9
San José State	10

Championship
UCLA	5
San José State	3
Third place
Long Beach State	7
Cal State Fullerton	9

== See also ==
- NCAA Men's Water Polo Championship
