= Jon Svendsen =

American water polo player (1953–2024)

- Youthful Jon Svendsen

Personal information
- Full name: Jon Howard Svendsen
- Born: 26 October 1953 Berkeley, California, U.S.
- Died: 20 September 2024 (aged 70) Phoenix, Arizona
- Occupation: Salesman
- Height: 190 cm (6 ft 3 in)
- Weight: 93 kg (205 lb)
- Spouse: Judi Scanlon

Sport
- College team: University of California Berkeley
- Club: Concord Aquatic Club
- Coached by: Peter J. Cutino (Berkeley); Monte Nitzkowski (Olympics)
Medal record
Men's water polo
Representing the United States
Olympic Games
| Silver medal – second place | 1984 Los Angeles | Men's water polo |

Jon Howard Svendsen (October 26, 1953 – September 20, 2024) was an American water polo player and swimmer. He was a member of the 1980 US Olympic Team, and earned a Silver Medal in water polo at the 1984 Summer Olympics in Los Angeles. He later had a thirty year career in sales.

== Early life ==
Jon Svendsen was born October 26, 1953 in Berkeley, California to Alberta and Howard Svendsen. Graduating in 1971, he attended Miramonte High School where he competed in basketball, water polo and swimming from 1968-1971. In January 1971, playing basketball for Miramonte he played Forward, and was coached by Tom Blackwood, with the team rated second in the Foothill Athletic League. In May, 1970 of his Junior year at Miramonte, at the North Coast Section Division 2 Championships, he placed first in the 100 backstroke with a time of 58.7, was on a winning 200 medley relay team, and also competed on a league record-breaking 400-yard freestyle relay team. In the fall of his High School Senior year at Miramonte High in late November, 1970, he was honored with his fourth consecutive Foothill Athletic League All-Star first team honor for water polo. In club swimming and water polo, he competed for the Concord Aquatic Club.

== University of California Berkeley ==
A standout for the U.C. Berkeley Bears on three consecutive NCAA title winning water polo teams from 1973-75, Svendsen was named the Collegiate Player of the Year, Pac-10 Player of the Year and NCAA Tournament MVP in 1975. He was managed and trained at Berkeley by Water Polo Hall of Fame Coach and Head Berkeley Coach Peter J. Cutino. Cutino coached Water Polo at Berkeley from 1963-88, and coached swimming from 1963-1973.

While at Stanford, Svendsen was an All-American in the years 1973, 1974 and 1975, and led Cal State Men's Water Polo to a combined 72-9 record during that span. From 1973-75, Svendsen was an NCAA Most Valuable Player.

== International competition ==
From 1973-1984, Svendsen played for the U.S. National team. At the Pan American games, where in 1975 he won a silver medal in Ciudad de México, later winning a gold in San Juan in San Juan in 1979, and another gold in Caracas in 1983. As a player, Svendsen was renowned for his 98 mph backhand. In 1973, 1975, 1978, and 1982, he played with the U.S. national team at the World Championships.

Svendsen qualified for the 1980 Moscow Olympics, but the U.S. team did not participate due to the U.S. boycott.

== 1984 Olympic silver medal ==
Svendsen was part of the U.S. national team at the 1984 Summer Olympics in Los Angeles, where he was coached by Hall of Fame and Olympic Head Coach Monte Nitzkowski, and was awarded a team silver medal in the men's water polo competition. The teams from Yugoslavia, Italy, the Soviet Union, Hungary and Spain were the pre-Olympic favorites to medal in water polo. Responding to the U.S. boycott of the 1980 Moscow Olympics, the teams from Hungary and Russia did not attend in 1984. The U.S. and Yugoslavia won their first three matches, and met in the final game to determine who would take the gold and silver medals. Going into the third quarter of play, the U.S. team held a late 5-2 advantage over Yugoslavia, but were unable to make another goal, and Yugoslavia tied the score 5-5 with three unanswered goals. Yugoslavia took the gold, West Germany the Bronze and Spain placed fourth.

=== Career pursuits ===
After his time as an elite swimming competitor, Svendsen had a career in sales for 30 years, eventually working as a Vice-President of Sales for a New Jersey-based Pharmaceutical company.

=== Honors ===
In 1989, Svendsen became a member of the Cal Athletics Hall of Fame and the USA Water Polo Hall of Fame. He was inducted into the Miramonte High School Hall of Fame in 2018.

Svendsen retired to Phoenix, Arizona to enjoy a warmer climate and be closer to Cabo, California where he enjoyed deep sea fishing. He died in Phoenix on September 20, 2024, at the age of 70. He was survived by his wife Judi Scanlon, step-children and grand-children.

== See also ==
- List of Olympic medalists in water polo (men)
