= 1974 NCAA Men's Water Polo Championship =

Water polo tournament season

Tournament details
- Dates: December 1974
- Teams: 8

Final positions
- Champions: California (2nd title)
- Runners-up: UC Irvine (2nd title game)
- Third place: UCLA
- Fourth place: Cal State Fullerton

Tournament statistics
- Matches played: 12
- Goals scored: 150 (12.5 per match)
- Top goal scorer(s): Jon Svendsen, California (9)

Awards
- Best player: Doug Healy, California

The 1974 NCAA Men's Water Polo Championship was the sixth annual NCAA Men's Water Polo Championship to determine the national champion of NCAA men's college water polo. Tournament matches were played at the Belmont Plaza Pool in Long Beach, California during December 1974.

California defeated UC Irvine in the final, 7–6, to win their second national title. This was a rematch of the previous year's final, also won by California.

The leading scorer for the tournament was Jon Svendsen from California (9 goals). Doug Healy, also from California, was named the Most Outstanding Player. An All-Tournament Team, consisting of three players, was also named.

== Qualification ==
Since there has only ever been one single national championship for water polo, all NCAA men's water polo programs (whether from Division I, Division II, or Division III) were eligible. A total of 8 teams were invited to contest this championship.

| Team | Appearance | Previous |
|---|---|---|
| Air Force | 1st | Never |
| California | 3rd | 1973 |
| Cal State Fullerton | 2nd | 1971 |
| Stanford | 3rd | 1971 |
| UC Davis | 1st | Never |
| UC Irvine | 6th | 1973 |
| UC Santa Barbara | 5th | 1973 |
| UCLA | 6th | 1973 |

== Bracket ==
- Site: Belmont Plaza Pool, Long Beach, California

Fifth place
UC Davis | 4
Stanford | 3
Seventh place
Air Force | 7
UC Santa Barbara | 12

Consolation semifinals
Air Force | 2
UC Davis | 9
UC Santa Barbara | 1
Stanford | 9

First round
California | 12
Air Force | 3
Cal State Fullerton | 7
UC Davis | 4
UC Irvine | 10
UC Santa Barbara | 6
UCLA | 9
Stanford | 5

Championship semifinals
California | 12
Cal State Fullerton | 3
UC Irvine | 5
UCLA | 3

Championship
California | 7
UC Irvine | 6
Third place
Cal State Fullerton | 4
UCLA | 7

== All-tournament team ==
- Doug Healy, California (Most outstanding player)
- Mike Loughlin, California
- Jon Svendsen, California

== See also ==
- NCAA Men's Water Polo Championship
