= Gary Figueroa =

American water polo player (born 1956)

Personal information
- Full name: Gary Lee Figueroa
- Born: September 28, 1956 (age 70) Phoenix, Arizona, U.S.
- Occupation: Coaching

Sport
- Sport: Water Polo
- College team: University of California Irvine (UCI)
- Coached by: Hank Vellekamp (Sunny Hills High); Ted Newland, Hank Vellekamp (UCI); Monte Nitzkowski ('84 Olympics)
Medal record
Men's water polo
Representing the United States
Olympic Games
Silver medal – second place	1984 Los Angeles	Men's water polo

Gary Lee Figueroa (born September 28, 1956, in Phoenix, Arizona) is a former water polo player from the United States, who competed for the University of California Irvine and won the silver medal with Team USA at the 1984 Summer Olympics in Los Angeles, California.

== Early life ==
Figueroa was born September 28, 1956 in Phoenix, Arizona, where by age eight he competed in age group swimming in Mesa. After a family move shortly before his High School Freshman year, he attended Sunny Hills High School, in Fullerton, California where he competed in water polo from 1971-1974. At Sunny Hills, Figueroa swam and played water polo under Coach Hank Vellekamp, who would later work as an Assistant water polo Coach at UC Irvine during Figueroa's tenure with the team. As a Senior in 1974, Figueroa was an All-California Interscholastic Federation (CIF) honoree, and a High School All American.

In club water polo, he competed with the Newport Athletic Foundation from 1975-1986.

== University of California Irvine ==
Gary Figueroa attended UC Irvine where he was on the swimming and water polo teams under long serving Head Coach Ted Newland, where in the three years from 1975-1977, he consecutively received All-American honors. He was ambidextrous and could shoot the ball with either hand easily.

Talented as a swimmer as well, at the NCAA Division meets as a UCI Sophomore, he placed second in both the 100 and 200-yard backstroke competitions. Around half of Figueroa's UCI water polo teammates also competed for the UCI swim team.

Recognized for many years during his water polo career, he received All-American honors seven times from U.S. Water Polo including the years 1975-1977, 1980-81, 1983 and 1986. Known for his shooting accuracy, he was usually selected to make UCI's penalty shots.

A member of the US National Team from 1975-84, he won gold medals at two Pan American Games, winning the first in 1979 in San Juan, Puerto Rico and the second in 1983 in Caracas, Venezuela.

== Olympics ==
Figueroa qualified to compete with the U.S. team at the 1980 Moscow Olympics, but did not attend as the U.S. boycotted the games protesting Human Rights violations in Russia.

=== 1984 Los Angeles Olympics ===
Four years later, he participated with the U.S. team at the 1984 Summer Olympics in Los Angeles, California in the Men's water polo tournament under Hall of Fame and Olympic Head Coach Monte Nitzkowski. The teams from Yugoslavia, Italy, the Soviet Union, Hungary and Spain were the pre-Olympic favorites to medal in water polo. Responding to the U.S. boycott of the 1980 Moscow Olympics, the teams from Hungary and Russia did not attend in 1984. The U.S. and Yugoslavia won their first three matches, and met in the final game to determine who would take the gold and silver medals. Going into the third quarter of play, the U.S. team held a late 5-2 advantage over Yugoslavia, but were unable to make another goal, and Yugoslavia tied the score 5-5 with three unanswered goals, winning the gold on score differential. Yugoslavia took the gold, West Germany the Bronze and Spain placed fourth.

=== Honors ===
In 1992, Figueroa was inducted into the USA Water Polo Hall of Fame, and was a Salinas Valley Sports Hall of Fame inductee.

Remaining in the sport after ending his years as an elite competitor, he started coaching at Salinas High School and later managed the water polo team at California State University, Monterey Bay. He has also coached boy's water polo at the York School in Monterey, California.

== See also ==
- List of Olympic medalists in water polo (men)
