= 1976 NCAA Men's Water Polo Championship =

Water polo tournament season

Tournament details
- Dates: December 1976
- Teams: 8

Final positions
- Champions: Stanford (1st title)
- Runners-up: UCLA (5th title game)
- Third place: UC Irvine
- Fourth place: UC Santa Barbara

Tournament statistics
- Matches played: 12
- Goals scored: 252 (21 per match)
- Attendance: 3,050 (254 per match)
- Top goal scorer(s): Dave Breen, Arizona (17)

Awards
- Best player: Chris Dorst, Stanford

The 1976 NCAA Men's Water Polo Championship was the eighth annual NCAA Men's Water Polo Championship to determine the national champion of NCAA men's college water polo. Tournament matches were played at the Belmont Plaza Pool in Long Beach, California during December 1976.

Stanford defeated UCLA in the final, 13–12, to win their first national title.

The leading scorer for the tournament was Dave Breen from Arizona (17 goals). Chris Dorst, from Stanford, was named the Most Outstanding Player. An All-Tournament Team, consisting of seven players, was also named.

== Qualification ==
Since there has only ever been one single national championship for water polo, all NCAA men's water polo programs (whether from Division I, Division II, or Division III) were eligible. A total of 8 teams were invited to contest this championship.

Team	Appearance	Previous
Arizona	2nd	1975
Loyola–Chicago	2nd	1972
Pittsburgh	1st	Never
Stanford	5th	1975
Texas A&M	1st	Never
UC Irvine	8th	1975
UC Santa Barbara	6th	1974
UCLA	8th	1975

== Bracket ==
- Site: Belmont Plaza Pool, Long Beach, California

Fifth place
Arizona	12
Texas A&M	9
Seventh place
Loyola–Chicago	12
Pittsburgh	11

Consolation semifinals
Arizona	14
Loyola–Chicago	6
Texas A&M	21
Pittsburgh	13

First round
Stanford	9
Arizona	8
UC Santa Barbara	13
Loyola–Chicago	5
UCLA	18
Texas A&M	3
UC Irvine	18
Pittsburgh	4

Championship semifinals
Stanford	7
UC Santa Barbara	6
UCLA	14
UC Irvine	9

Championship
Stanford	13
UCLA	12
Third place
UC Santa Barbara	7
UC Irvine (2OT)	8

== All-tournament team ==
- Chris Dorst, Stanford (Most outstanding player)
- Rob Arnold, Stanford
- Rick Johannsen, Stanford
- Drew McDonald, Stanford
- Boyd Philpot, UC Irvine
- John Stephens, UCLA
- Joe Vargas, UCLA

== See also ==
- NCAA Men's Water Polo Championship
