= 1992 NCAA Men's Water Polo Championship =

Water polo tournament season

Tournament details
- Dates: December 1992
- Teams: 8

Final positions
- Champions: California (11th title)
- Runners-up: Stanford (10th title game)

Tournament statistics
- Matches played: 12
- Goals scored: 249 (20.75 per match)
- Attendance: 3,517 (293 per match)
- Top goal scorer(s): Danny Leyson, USC (12)

Awards
- Best player: Dirk Zeien (California)

The 1992 NCAA Men's Water Polo Championship was the 24th annual NCAA Men's Water Polo Championship to determine the national champion of NCAA men's collegiate water polo. Tournament matches were played at the Belmont Plaza Pool in Long Beach, California during December 1992.

California defeated rival Stanford in the final, 12–11 (in three overtimes), to win their eleventh, and third consecutive, national title. The undefeated Golden Bears (31–0) were coached by Steve Heaston.

The Most Outstanding Player of the tournament was Dirk Zeien from California. Zeien, along with six other players, was named to the All-Tournament Team.

The tournament's leading scorer, with 12 goals, was Danny Leyson from USC.

== Qualification ==
Since there has only ever been one single national championship for water polo, all NCAA men's water polo programs (whether from Division I, Division II, or Division III) were eligible. A total of 8 teams were invited to contest this championship.

Team	Appearance	Previous
California	19th	1991
UC Irvine	20th	1991
UC San Diego	3rd	1991
Navy	7th	1991
Pepperdine	10th	1991
Princeton	1st	Never
USC	12th	1988
Stanford	19th	1990

== Bracket ==
- Site: Belmont Plaza Pool, Long Beach, California

Fifth place
Pepperdine	13
UC San Diego	6
Seventh place
Navy	14
Princeton	9

Consolation semifinals
Navy	8
Pepperdine	19
Princeton	9
UC San Diego	14

First round
California	15
Navy	2
UC Irvine	11
Pepperdine	8
Stanford	18
Princeton	5
USC	16
UC San Diego	7

Championship semifinals
California	8
UC Irvine	5
Stanford	11
USC	7

Championship
California (3OT)	12
Stanford	11
Third place
UC Irvine	10
USC	11

== All-tournament team ==
- Dirk Zeien, California (Most outstanding player)
- Troy Barnhart, California
- Larry Bercutt, Stanford
- Chip Blankenhorn, Stanford
- Steve Gill, UC Irvine
- Danny Leyson, USC
- Chris Oeding, California

== See also ==
- NCAA Men's Water Polo Championship
