= 1969 NCAA Men's Water Polo Championship =

Water polo tournament season

Tournament details
- Dates: December 1969
- Teams: 8

Final positions
- Champions: UCLA (1st title)
- Runners-up: California (1st title game)
- Third place: UC Santa Barbara
- Fourth place: Long Beach State

Tournament statistics
- Matches played: 12
- Goals scored: 145 (12.08 per match)
- Top goal scorer(s): Ben Gage, UCSB (14)

The 1969 NCAA Men's Water Polo Championship was the first annual NCAA Men's Water Polo Championship to determine the national championship of NCAA men's college water polo. Tournament matches were played at Belmont Plaza Pool in Long Beach, California during December 1969.

UCLA defeated California in the final, 5–2, to win their first championship.

The leading scorer for the tournament was Ben Gage, from UC Santa Barbara, with 14 goals. The awards for All-Tournament Team and Most Outstanding Player were not given out until 1972.

== Qualification ==
Since there has only been one single national championship for water polo, all NCAA men's water polo programs (whether from Division I, Division II, or Division III) were eligible. A total of 8 teams were invited to contest this championship.

Team	Appearance	Previous
California	1st	Never
Colorado State	1st	Never
Long Beach State	1st	Never
UC Irvine	1st	Never
UCLA	1st	Never
UC Santa Barbara	1st	Never
USC	1st	Never
Yale	1st	Never

== Bracket ==
- Site: Belmont Plaza Pool, Long Beach, California

Fifth place
USC	2
UC Irvine	3
Seventh place
Yale	5
Colorado State	9

Consolation semifinals
USC	13
Yale	3
Colorado State	4
UC Irvine	10

First round
UCLA	4
USC	3
Long Beach State	17
Yale	1
UC Santa Barbara	7
Colorado State	3
California (OT)	5
UC Irvine	4

Championship semifinals
UCLA	9
Long Beach State	6
UC Santa Barbara	4
California	6

Championship
UCLA	5
California	2
Third place
Long Beach State	8
UC Santa Barbara	12

== See also ==
- NCAA Men's Water Polo Championship
