= James Bergeson =

American water polo player (born 1961)

Personal information
- Full name: James Hunter Bergeson
- Born: March 21, 1961 (age 65) Newport Beach, California, U.S.
- Occupation(s): Owner, equipment rental business
- Height: 183 cm (6 ft 0 in)
- Weight: 86 kg (190 lb)
- Spouse: Fran
- Children: 2

Sport
- Sport: Water Polo
- Position: Driver (WP) (Most likely)
- College team: Stanford University
- Coached by: Bill Barnett (Newport High, Olympics); Dante Dettamanti (Stanford)
Medal record
Men's water polo
Representing the United States
Olympic Games
Silver medal – second place	1988 Seoul	Men's water polo

James Hunter Bergeson (born March 21, 1961, in Newport Beach, California) is a former water polo player who competed for Stanford and won the silver medal in Men's water polo for the United States at the 1988 Summer Olympics in Seoul, South Korea. In later life, he owned and started an equipment rental business. In 2002, he was inducted into the USA Water Polo Hall of Fame.

James Bergeson was born March 21, 1961 in Newport Beach, California, and attended and played water polo for Newport Harbor High School from around 1976-1979 where he was coached by long-serving Newport High coach and USA Water Polo Hall of Fame member Bill Barnett. As a High School upperclassman in 1978, he was voted to the Citizen Savings All-CIF Southern Section 4A Water Polo Team, and was also named a Most Valuable Player. While an athlete at Newport Harbor High, Bergeson received the honor of being named a High School All American.

== Stanford University ==
Bergeson attended classes and played water polo for Stanford University from 1979-1983, where he was coached by Dante Dettamanti and was an All American four times. He was part of the Stanford team that won the NCAA national title in Water Polo in 1980 and 1981, with the team finishing second in 1983. With his frequent scoring, Bergeson likely played primarily as a perimeter Driver, where he could take advantage of his speed and shooting accuracy. As a driver, he would generally play or line up even with the ends of the goals, allowing him to score and give scoring assists frequently.

Benefitting from his water polo experience while playing for Stanford University, Bergeson was part of the U.S. National Water Polo team from 1982-1988. He played for the U.S. Junior National team from around 1982-1987.

== 1988 Olympic silver medal ==
As coached by U.S. Olympic Coach Bill Barnett, at the September, 1988 Olympics in Seoul, Korea, Bergeson was part of the U.S. Water Polo team that won the silver medal in the 1988 Olympic Men's water polo competition. Pre-Olympic favorite Yugoslavia and the U.S. team were part of group play in their first Olympic match, where the U.S. team bettered Yugoslavia 7-6. But Yugoslavia performed better in the remaining rounds of group play, with the U.S. team recording a loss to the team from Spain in a score of 9-7. With more overall goals, the Yugoslavian and U.S. teams both advanced to the semi-final rounds, where they each won their first match and were later paired in the final match for the gold medal. The U.S. final match with Yugoslavia was tied 6-6 in regular play, but in overtime Yugoslavia took a 9-6 lead making the first three goals, and later won the gold medal with a 9-7 overtime win. The team from the Soviet Union took the bronze, and the West German team placed fourth.

=== International competition highlights ===
In international competition, Bergeson won a gold medal at the 1987 Pan American Games in Indianapolis, Indiana, as part of the U.S. National team. In the 1982 and 1986 World Championships, he competed for the US, and in 1985 and 1987 represented America as part of the World Cup team.

Bergeson is married to wife Fran and has two children.

=== Honors ===
Bergeson was named to the USA Water Polo Hall of Fame in 2002, and was announced as part of a California Interscholastic Federation Water Polo All-Century team in 2014.

In his later career, Bergeson started a rental business that serviced both private individuals and companies.

== See also ==
- List of Olympic medalists in water polo (men)
