= Jody Campbell =

American water polo player (born 1960)

Personal information
- Full name: Jodocus David Campbell
- Born: March 4, 1960 (age 66) Bellflower, California, U.S.
- Occupation: Real Estate Developer
- Height: 190 cm (6 ft 3 in)
- Weight: 89 kg (196 lb)
- Spouse: Kari Rush-Campbell

Sport
- Sport: Water Polo
- Position: Goal line defender
- College team: Stanford University (1981)
- Coached by: Dante Dettamanti (Stanford)
Medal record
Men's water polo
Representing the United States
Olympic Games
Silver medal – second place	1984 Los Angeles	Men's water polo
Silver medal – second place	1988 Seoul	Men's water polo

Jodocus "Jody" David Campbell (born March 4, 1960, in Bellflower, California) is a former water polo player who won silver medals for the United States at the 1984 Summer Olympics in Los Angeles, California, and the 1988 Summer Olympics in Seoul, South Korea.

Campbell was born March 4, 1960, in Bellflower, California, and attended Wilson High School in Long Beach, California, part of greater Los Angeles. In addition to Water Polo, Cambell swam breaststroke for Wilson High's Coach Bob Gruneisen, where he trained with a very strong regional team that boasted an undefeated record in dual team meets in the Moore League from 1972 to 1976. Though he broke his hand during the swim season in 1975-1976, he recovered and won the 100-yard backstroke in 58.3, helping to lead Wilson High to the Moore League Dual Meet Swimming title in March, 1976.

Campbell became better known playing varsity Water Polo representing Wilson from 1975 to 1978 where he was a leader of the team's offense. His coaches included Ken Hamdorf in 1977.

== Stanford university ==
Campbell attended Stanford University from 1977 to 1981, graduating in 1981. At Stanford, Campbell was coached by Dante Dettamanti, who coached the Cardinal Water Polo team from 1977 to 2001, winning seven NCAA championships during his career, and becoming a USA Water Polo Hall of Fame Coach in 2002. At Stanford, Campbell was the recipient of All-American honors in Water Polo in three successive years from 1979 to 1981 and helped lead the Cardinals to NCAA titles in the years 1978 and 1980-81.

== Olympics ==
Campbell, while still competing for Stanford, was named to the 1980 U.S. Olympic Water Polo team, but did not attend due to the U.S. boycott.

== 1984 Los Angeles Olympic silver ==
Campbell participated in the early August, 1984 Los Angeles Olympic Men's water polo event at Pepperdine University. The relative level of elite international competition was significantly changed with both the Soviet Union and Hungary, former World Champions, boycotting the games. In their absence, Yugoslavia and West Germany were considered favorites. The six teams that made the final rounds were Yugoslavia, Group A of the Netherlands, Group B of Spain, the United States, West Germany and Group C of Australia. The United States and Yugoslavia won their first three games, and played against each other to determine the gold and silver medalists. The United States, in the third quarter held a significant 5–2 lead against Yugoslavia in the final round, but failed to score again, with Yugoslavia tying the game 5-5. This score still gave Yugoslavia the gold, as they had scored more goals overall in the final rounds. The U.S. team took the silver with West Germany capturing the bronze, and Spain placing fourth.

== 1988 Soul Olympic silver ==
Campbell also won a silver medal at the 1988 Seoul Olympics in Men's water polo at the Seoul Sports Complex in Seoul, South Korea. Campbell played a goal line defender as his primary position, focusing within 2 meters of the goal line, and was considered by several sports journalists to be one of the Olympic team's best players in 1988.

As in 1984, the Yugoslavian team had been strongly favored to win the gold, but by 1988, the U.S. and Yugoslavian team were closer to equals. In the two months prior to the Olympics, the U.S. team had beaten Yugoslavia five of eight times. The U.S. team beat Yugoslavia 7–6 in the opening round of group play, but Yugoslavia did better in the group competition, as the U.S. team lost to Spain by a margin of 9-7. As in 1984, Yugoslavia scored more goals in group play, though both teams did well in the semi-finals, and met in the final round. The U.S. team held a lead of 5–2 in the third quarter of play in the final match, but Yugoslavia earned four successive goals to take a lead at 6-5, before the U.S. team tied the final match at 6-6. Taking command in overtime, Yugoslavia scored the first three goals to take at 9–6 lead, and won the overtime period with a 9–7 victory for the gold medal. The U.S. team took the silver as in 1984, with the Soviet Union taking the bronze medal.

=== International competition highlights ===
In International Competition, Campbell, from 1978 to 1988, was a Member of the US National Team. In a career highlight, his U.S. National Team won gold medals at the Pan American Team Championships in 1983 in Caracas, and in 1987 in Indianapolis. In 1986, he played for the World Championship Team. His U.S. National team won a silver in the FINA World Cup in 1979 in Belgrade. Established as a solid competitor in the World Cup but not always a recipient of medals, Campbell's U.S. National team placed fourth in the FINA World Cup in 1981 in Long Beach, placed fourth again in the 1984 FINA World Cup in Malibu, and fourth again in the 1987 FINA World Cup in Thessalonika, Greece.

Campbell played Water Polo for the Newport Beach Club from 1978 to 1988. In his professional career, he served in the field of Real Estate Development, where he had begun work by the 1988 Olympics.

He married his wife Kari Rush by 1988, after they met at Stanford. Kari was an All-American volleyball player at Stanford who served as Captain in 1986, and worked for a period training exotic animals for movie productions.

=== Honors ===
In 1994, he was inducted into the USA Water Polo Hall of Fame. In 1984, after his first Olympic silver medal he was voted Water Polo Athlete of the Year. In his Junior and Senior years playing Water Polo for Wilson High, he was named Long Beach's Outstanding Water Polo Player of the Year by Coaches of the Moore League, and received All-CIF Honors.

== See also ==
- List of Olympic medalists in water polo (men)
