= 1973 NCAA Men's Water Polo Championship =

Water polo tournament season

Tournament details
- Dates: December 1973
- Teams: 8

Final positions
- Champions: California (1st title)
- Runners-up: UC Irvine (1st title game)
- Third place: USC
- Fourth place: UCLA

Tournament statistics
- Matches played: 12
- Goals scored: 151 (12.58 per match)
- Top goal scorer(s): Bruce Kocsis, USC (8)

The 1973 NCAA Men's Water Polo Championship was the fifth annual NCAA Men's Water Polo Championship to determine the national champion of NCAA men's college water polo. Tournament matches were played at the Belmont Plaza Pool in Long Beach, California during December 1973.

California defeated UC Irvine in the final, 8–4, to win their first national title.

The leading scorer for the tournament was Bruce Kocsis from USC (8 goals). The award for Most Outstanding Player was not given out this year, but an All-Tournament Team was named.

== Qualification ==
Since there has only ever been one single national championship for water polo, all NCAA men's water polo programs (whether from Division I, Division II, or Division III) were eligible. A total of 8 teams were invited to contest this championship.

Team	Appearance	Previous
California	2nd	1969
Long Beach State	4th	1971
New Mexico	3rd	1972
San José State	4th	1972
UC Irvine	5th	1972
UC Santa Barbara	4th	1972
USC	4th	1972
UCLA	5th	1972

== Bracket ==
- Site: Belmont Plaza Pool, Long Beach, California

Fifth place
UC Santa Barbara	5
San José State	6
Seventh place
New Mexico	5
Long Beach State	7

Consolation semifinals
New Mexico	7
UC Santa Barbara	12
Long Beach State	3
San José State	7

First round
California	8
New Mexico	7
UCLA	14
UC Santa Barbara	2
UC Irvine	7
Long Beach State	5
USC	7
San José State	5

Championship semifinals
UCLA	2
California	4
UC Irvine	9
USC	5

Championship
California	8
UC Irvine	4
Third place
UCLA	5
USC	7

== All-tournament team ==
- Bruce Kocsis, USC
- Bruce Black, UC Irvine
- Jim Kruse, UC Irvine

== See also ==
- NCAA Men's Water Polo Championship
