= Kevin Robertson =

American water polo player (born 1959)

Personal information
- Full name: Kevin George Robertson
- Born: February 8, 1959 (age 67) Biloxi, Mississippi, U.S.
- Occupation: Mortgage banker
- Height: 175 cm (5 ft 9 in)
- Weight: 75 kg (165 lb)

Sport
- Sport: Water Polo
- Position: Driver (Left-handed)
- College team: University of California Berkeley
- Club: Concord Water Polo Club; Newport Water Polo Club
- Coached by: Bill Barnett (High School, Olympics); Peter Cutino (Berkeley); Monte Nitzkowski (84 Olympics)
Medal record
Men's water polo
Representing the United States
Olympic Games
Silver medal – second place	1984 Los Angeles	Men's water polo
Silver medal – second place	1988 Seoul	Men's water polo

Kevin George Robertson (born February 8, 1959) is an American former water polo player, who competed for the University of California Berkeley, and won two Olympic silver medals during his career: in 1984 and 1988.

== Early life ==
Kevin Robertson was born February 8, 1959, in Biloxi, Mississippi. He started playing water polo in age group programs in Riverside and then Santa Ana Heights, California. Having already gained a knowledge of the game, he attended and played water polo for Newport Harbor High School from 1973 to 1976, a public High School in Newport Beach, California, with a strong tradition in Water Polo. In 1975, Robertson was a 4A Water Polo First Team honoree under Newport Harbor High's Head Coach Bill Barnett and helped take the team to the CIF 4A Championship. Long serving Newport Harbor High Coach Barnett won 10 CIF 4A High School championship during his 50-year tenure beginning in 1966. Robertson later played for the Concord Water Polo Club and the Newport Water Polo Club from 1977 to 1988.

== University of California Berkeley ==
From 1977 to 1980, Robertson played for the University of California Berkeley under USA Water Polo Hall of Fame Coach Peter Cutino, earning All-American honors in four years, and participating on the team that won the 1977 NCAA title. Robertson typically played as an attacking right sided driver, where he could quickly move play and take advantage of his strong and accurate left-handed shots and assists.

He played with the US national water polo team from 1977 to 1988 which was coached by Bill Barnett beginning in 1985.

== Olympics ==
Robertson qualified for the 1980 U.S. Olympic water polo team, which boycotted the 1980 Moscow games.

=== Los Angeles 1984 silver medal ===
In the next Olympics, he won a silver medal with the 1984 U.S. Olympic Men's water polo team under Head U.S. Olympic Head Coach Monte Nitzkowski. As a result of the Russian boycott of the U.S. Olympic games in Los Angeles, California, neither Russia nor Hungary, strong pre-Olympic favorites attended the 1984 Olympics. Yugoslavia and West Germany were pre-Olympic favorites, but the U.S. team had greatly improved, and Spain was also considered a strong candidate for a medal. The U.S. and Yugoslavia won their first three games and played each other in a match to determine the gold and silver medalists. The U.S. held a 5–2 lead over Yugoslavia late into quarter three, but were unable to make additional goals, and Yugoslavia rebounded to tie the score, 5-5, which gave them the gold for having more total goals scored in Olympic matches than the U.S. West Germany captured bronze and Spain placed fourth.

=== Seoul, Korea 1988 silver medal ===
With Robertson later participating at the September, 1988 Olympics in Seoul, South Korea, under Head Olympic Coach Bill Barnett, the U.S. team again won silver, with Yugoslavia again capturing the gold medal with the returning Soviet Union taking the bronze. In the final rounds, in a match reminiscent of the 1984 Olympics, the United States carried a 5–2 lead into the third quarter. Yugoslavia rebounded and poured in four goals assuming a 6–5 lead. America then tied the match 6-6. In overtime play, Yugoslavia came out strong, scoring three early goals to lead 9–6, and subsequently won ng 9–7, taking the gold medal, while leaving the Silver to the U.S.

=== International competition highlights ===
In international competitions, Robertson played on:

- The World Championship Teams in 1982, 86, and 88;
- The FINA World Cup Team in 1979 in Belgrade-Rijeka, Yugoslavia, winning a silver medal;
- The FINA World Cup Team in 1981 in Long Beach, California, placing fourth;
- The FINA World Cup Team in 1983 in Malibu, California, placing fourth;
- The FINA World Cup Team in 1987 Thessaloniki Greece, placing fourth;
- The U.S. National team at the Pan American Games in 1979 in San Juan, Puerto Rico, winning the gold medal;
- The U.S. National team at the Pan American Games in 1983 in Caracas, Venezuela, winning the gold medal;
- The U.S. National team at the Pan American Games in 1987 in Indianapolis, Indiana, again winning a gold medal.

=== Professional life ===
Robertson later had a career as a mortgage banker.

=== Honors ===
In 1994, he was inducted into the USA Water Polo Hall of Fame.

== See also ==
- List of Olympic medalists in water polo (men)
