= 2023 NCAA Men's Water Polo Championship =

Collegiate water polo championship

2023 NCAA Men's Water Polo tournament
- Teams: 8
- Format: Single-elimination
- Finals site: Uytengsu Aquatics Center; Los Angeles, California
- Champions: California (17th title)
- Runner-up: UCLA
- Semifinalists: Princeton; Southern California
- Winning coach: Kirk Everist (6th title)
- MVP: Nikos Papanikolaou (California)
- Television: NCAA, ESPN+, and ESPNU

The 2023 NCAA Men's Water Polo Championship occurred from December 1–3, 2023, in Los Angeles, California at the Uytengsu Aquatics Center and hosted by the University of Southern California. This was the 55th NCAA Men's Water Polo Championship. Eight teams participated in this championship. Before the 2023 season, the tournament was approved to expand to nine teams, though the Southern California Athletic Conference (SCAC) chose to decline its automatic bid. This cancellation eliminated the opening-round play-in game and kept the final tournament bracket at eight teams. The California Golden Bears were the defending national champions.

== Qualifying teams ==
Six conferences were granted automatic qualification to the championship: Big West Conference (Big West), Mid-Atlantic Water Polo Conference (MAWPC), Mountain Pacific Sports Federation (MPSF), Northeast Water Polo Conference (NWPC), West Coast Conference (WCC), and the Western Water Polo Association (WWPA). Two additional teams earned entry into the tournament with at-large bids, with both of them coming from the Mountain Pacific Sports Federation.

Seed	Team	Conference	Bid type	Appearance
1	UCLA	MPSF	At-large	38th
2	California	MPSF	At-large	33rd
3	Southern California	MPSF	Automatic	38th
4	Princeton	NWPC	Automatic	9th
	Biola	WWPA	Automatic	1st
	Fordham	MAWPC	Automatic	3rd
	San Jose State	WCC	Automatic	5th
	UC Irvine	Big West	Automatic	22nd

== Schedule ==
All times are Eastern time

December 1	December 1	December 2	December 3
First Round Games 1 & 2	First Round Games 3 & 4	Semifinals	Championship
3:00 p.m. & 5:00 p.m.	7:00 p.m. & 9:00 p.m.	5:00 p.m. & 7:00 p.m.	6:00 p.m.

== Bracket ==
The championship featured a knockout format where schools that lost were eliminated from the tournament. The championship pairings were announced on Sunday, November 19, 2023 by the NCAA Men’s Water Polo Committee.

First round Friday, December 1, 2023
1	UCLA	20
Biola	7
4	Princeton	12
UC Irvine	7
2	California	16
Fordham	6
3	Southern California	18
San Jose State	10

Semifinals; Saturday, December 2, 2023
1	UCLA	17
4	Princeton	13
2	California	10
3	Southern California	9

Championship; Sunday, December 3, 2023
1	UCLA	11
2	California	13

== All Tournament Team ==
After the championship, the All-NCAA Tournament First and Second teams were announced.

=== First Team ===
- Nikolaos Papanikolaou (Most Outstanding Player, California)
- Max Casabella (California)
- Adrian Weinberg (California)
- Jack Larsen (UCLA)
- Rafael Real Vergara (UCLA)
- Nassimo Di Martire (Southern California)
- Max Miller (Southern California)

=== Second Team ===
- Jack Howerton (California)
- Garret Griggs (UCLA)
- Makoto Kenney (UCLA)
- Jake Cavano (UCLA)
- Carson Kranz (Southern California)
- Vladan Mitrovic (Princeton)
- Roko Pozaric (Princeton)
