= 2004 NCAA Men's Water Polo Championship =

Water polo tournament season

Tournament details
- Dates: December 2004
- Teams: 4

Final positions
- Champions: UCLA (8th title)
- Runners-up: Stanford (18th title game)

Tournament statistics
- Matches played: 4
- Goals scored: 62 (15.5 per match)
- Attendance: 3,044 (761 per match)
- Top goal scorer(s): Endre Rex-Kiss, LMU (7)

Awards
- Best player: Brett Ormsby, UCLA

The 2004 NCAA Men's Water Polo Championship was the 36th annual NCAA Men's Water Polo Championship to determine the national champion of NCAA men's collegiate water polo. Tournament matches were played at the Avery Aquatic Center in Stanford, California during December 2004.

As of 2024, this was the last year USC failed to make the playoffs. They have won 8 in this time period, winning six straight between 2008-2013, and appearing in the Championship Game 14 times in a row (2005-2018).

UCLA defeated Stanford in the final, 10–9 (in overtime), to win their eighth national title. The Bruins (25–3) were coached by Adam Krikorian.

The Most Outstanding Player of the tournament was Brett Ormsby from UCLA. For the first time, two All-Tournament Teams were named: a First Team (with eight players) and a Second Team (with seven players).

The tournament's leading scorer, with 7 goals, was Endre Rex-Kiss from Loyola Marymount.

== Qualification ==
Since there has only ever been one single national championship for water polo, all NCAA men's water polo programs (whether from Division I, Division II, or Division III) were eligible. A total of 4 teams were invited to contest this championship.

Team	Appearance	Previous
Loyola Marymount	3rd	2003
Princeton	2nd	1994
Stanford	27th	2003
UCLA	26th	2001

== Bracket ==
- Site: Avery Aquatic Center, Stanford, California

Semifinals
1	Stanford	14
4	Loyola Marymount	6
2	UCLA	7
3	Princeton	5

Championship
1	Stanford	9
2	UCLA (OT)	10
Third Place
4	Loyola Marymount	6
3	Princeton	5

== All-tournament teams ==
=== First Team ===
- Brett Ormsby, UCLA (Most outstanding player)
- Joe Axelrad, UCLA
- Tony Azevedo, Stanford
- Greg Crum, Stanford
- Albert Garcia, UCLA
- Thomas Hopkins, Stanford
- Endre Rex-Kiss, Loyola Marymount
- Peter Varellas, Stanford

=== Second Team ===
- Josh Hewko, UCLA
- Michael March, UCLA
- Brian McShane, Loyola Marymount
- Jamal Motlagh, Princeton
- Ted Peck, UCLA
- Peter Sabbatini, Princeton
- John Stover, Princeton

== See also ==
- NCAA Men's Water Polo Championship
- NCAA Women's Water Polo Championship
