= 2008 NCAA Men's Water Polo Championship =

Water polo tournament season

Tournament details
- Dates: December 6–7, 2008
- Teams: 4

Final positions
- Champions: USC (4th title)
- Runners-up: Stanford (20th title game)

Tournament statistics
- Matches played: 4
- Goals scored: 61 (15.25 per match)
- Attendance: 2,660 (665 per match)
- Top goal scorer(s): Kyle Wertz, Navy (6)

Awards
- Best player: J.W. Krumpholz, USC

The 2008 NCAA Men's Water Polo Championship was the 40th annual NCAA Men's Water Polo Championship to determine the national champion of NCAA men's collegiate water polo. Tournament matches were played at the Avery Aquatic Center in Stanford, California from December 6–7, 2008.

USC defeated Stanford in the final, 7–5, to win their fourth national title. The undefeated Trojans (29–0) were coached by Jovan Vavic. This would go on to become the first of USC's record six straight national championships (2008–2013).

The Most Outstanding Player of the tournament was J.W. Krumpholz from USC. Additionally, two All-Tournament Teams were named: a First Team (with seven players, including Krumpholz) and a Second Team (also with ninth players).

The tournament's leading scorer, with 6 goals, was Kyle Wertz from Navy.

== Qualification ==
Since there has only ever been one single national championship for water polo, all NCAA men's water polo programs (whether from Division I, Division II, or Division III) were eligible. A total of 4 teams were invited to contest this championship.

| Team | Appearance | Previous |
|---|---|---|
| Loyola Marymount | 6th | 2007 |
| Navy | 14th | 2007 |
| USC | 23rd | 2007 |
| Stanford | 29th | 2005 |

== Bracket ==
- Site: Avery Aquatic Center, Stanford, California

Semifinals; December 6
1 | USC (27–0) | 14
4 | Navy (20–9) | 9
2 | Stanford (24–5) | 6
3 | Loyola Marymount (20–9) | 5

Championship; December 7
1 | USC | 7
2 | Stanford | 5
Third Place; December 7
4 | Navy | 4
3 | Loyola Marymount | 11

== All-tournament teams ==
=== First Team ===
- J.W. Krumpholz, USC (Most outstanding player)
- Shea Buckner, USC
- Tim Hummel, Loyola Marymount
- Matt Sagehorn, USC
- Andy Stevens, Loyola Marymount
- Drac Wigo, Stanford
- Sage Wright, Stanford

=== Second Team ===
- Tibor Forai, Loyola Marymount
- Tim Heafner, Loyola Marymount
- Will Hindle-Katel, Stanford
- Peter Kurzeka, USC
- Arjan Ligtenberg, USC
- Mike Mulvey, Navy
- Jimmie Sandman, Stanford
- Jovan Vranes, USC
- Janson Wigo, Stanford

== See also ==
- NCAA Men's Water Polo Championship
- NCAA Women's Water Polo Championship
