= 2002 NCAA Men's Water Polo Championship =

United States national water polo tournament

Tournament details
- Dates: December 2002
- Teams: 4

Final positions
- Champions: Stanford (10th title)
- Runners-up: California (18th title game)

Tournament statistics
- Matches played: 4
- Goals scored: 59 (14.75 per match)
- Attendance: 4,767 (1,192 per match)
- Top goal scorer(s): Michael Vieira, Queens–NY (5); Tony Azevedo, Stanford (5)

Awards
- Best player: Tony Azevedo, Stanford (2)

The 2002 NCAA Men's Water Polo Championship was the 34th annual NCAA Men's Water Polo Championship to determine the national champion of NCAA men's collegiate water polo. Tournament matches were played at the Burns Aquatic Center on the campus of Loyola Marymount University in Los Angeles, California during December 2002.

Stanford defeated rival California in the final, 7–6, to win their tenth national title. The Cardinal (24–5) were coached by John Vargas.

The Most Outstanding Player of the tournament was again Tony Azevedo from Stanford. Azevedo, along with six other players, also comprised the All-Tournament Team.

Azevedo, along with Queens College's Michael Vieira, were the tournament's leading scorers, with 5 goals each.

== Qualification ==
Since there has only ever been one single national championship for water polo, all NCAA men's water polo programs (whether from Division I, Division II, or Division III) were eligible. A total of 4 teams were invited to contest this championship.

Team	Appearance	Previous
California	23rd	1995
UC San Diego	9th	2000
Queens College (NY)	2nd	1997
Stanford	25th	2001

== Bracket ==
- Site: Burns Aquatics Center, Los Angeles, California

Semi-finals
Stanford	10
UC San Diego	5
California	14
Queens (NY)	6

Championship
Stanford	7
California	6
Third Place
UC San Diego	5
Queens (NY)	6^{OT}

== All-tournament team ==
- Tony Azevedo, Stanford (Most outstanding player)
- Attila Banhidy, California
- Nick Ellis, Stanford
- Peter Hudnut, Stanford
- Chris Lathrop, California
- Andrew Stoddard, California
- Michael Vieira, Queens (NY)

== See also ==
- NCAA Men's Water Polo Championship
- NCAA Women's Water Polo Championship
