= 2018 NCAA Men's Water Polo Championship =

2018 NCAA Men's Water Polo tournament
- Teams: 8
- Format: Single-elimination
- Finals site: Avery Aquatic Center; Stanford, California
- Champions: USC Trojans (10th title, 23rd title game, 28th Final Four)
- Runner-up: Stanford Cardinal (21st title game, 28th Final Four)
- Semifinalists: UCLA Bruins (31st Final Four); UC San Diego Tritons (10th Final Four)
- Winning coach: Adam Wright (3rd title)
- MVP: Jacob Mercep ((USC))
- Television: NCAA

The 2018 NCAA Men's Water Polo Championship occurred from November 24, 2018, to December 2, 2018, in Stanford, California at the Avery Aquatic Center. This was the 50th NCAA Men's Water Polo Championship. Eight teams across from all divisions participated in this championship.

== Schedule ==
November 24	November 29	December 1	December 2
First Round	Quarterfinals	Semifinals	Championship

== Qualification ==
The six-member selection committee selected eight institutions based on a wide number of factors, primarily number of wins, rigor of schedule, level of availability, an indication of an upward trend or winning consistently, and RPI.

Institution	Conference	Record	Appearance	Last bid
George Washington	A-10	22–6	2nd	2017
Long Beach State	Big West	13–11	12th	1991
Pomona–Pitzer	SCIAC	24–8	3rd	2017
Princeton	Ivy League	19–10	6th	2015
Stanford	MPSF	20–2	32nd	2014
UCLA	MPSF	22–4	34th	2017
UC San Diego	CCAA	19–5	15th	2015
USC	MPSF	28–3	33rd	2017

== Seeding ==
Likewise with the criteria mentioned above, seeding was based on level of ranking, geographic proximity to the finals site, and a projected low level of academic commitments missed. The pots outlined feature what level in the championship institutions competed in, ranging from competing away in the first round for Pot 4 to skipping to the semifinals in Pot 1.

Pot 1	Pot 2	Pot 3	Pot 4
USC	UCLA	Princeton	George Washington
Stanford	UC San Diego	Long Beach State	Pomona–Pitzer

== Bracket ==
The championship featured a knockout format where schools that lost were eliminated from the tournament.

First Round
24 November – Long Beach
Long Beach State	12
Pomona–Pitzer	5
UC San Diego – Bye	0
UC San Diego – Bye	0
Stanford – Bye	0
Stanford – Bye	0
Stanford – Bye	0
Stanford – Bye	0
USC – Bye	0
USC – Bye	0
USC – Bye	0
USC – Bye	0
UCLA – Bye	0
UCLA – Bye	0
25 November – Princeton
Princeton	13
George Washington	14

Quarterfinals
29 November – Stanford
Long Beach State	9
UC San Diego	14
Stanford – Bye	0
Stanford – Bye	0
USC – Bye	0
USC – Bye	0
29 November – Stanford
George Washington	6
UCLA	18

Semifinals
1 December – Stanford
UC San Diego	7
Stanford	16
1 December – Stanford
USC	8
UCLA	7

Championship
2 December – Stanford
Stanford	12
USC	14

== Honors ==
The following distinctions were distributed concluding the championship to athletes that had superior performance of some kind in the championship.

=== Team rankings ===
Institution	Ranking
USC	No. 1
Stanford	No. 2
UCLA	No. 3
UC San Diego	No. 4
Long Beach State	No. 5
George Washington	No. 6
Princeton	No. 7
Pomona–Pitzer	No. 8
