= 2007 NCAA Men's Water Polo Championship =

Water polo tournament season

Tournament details
- Dates: December 1–2, 2007
- Teams: 4

Final positions
- Champions: California (13th title)
- Runners-up: USC (11th title game)

Tournament statistics
- Matches played: 4
- Goals scored: 52 (13 per match)
- Attendance: 4,369 (1,092 per match)
- Top goal scorer(s): Tim Hummel, LMU (4)

Awards
- Best player: Michael Sharf, California

The 2007 NCAA Men's Water Polo Championship was the 39th annual NCAA Men's Water Polo Championship to determine the national champion of NCAA men's collegiate water polo. Tournament matches were played at the Avery Aquatic Center in Stanford, California from December 1–2, 2007.

California defeated USC in the final, 8–6, to win their thirteenth national title. The Golden Bears (28–4) were coached by Kirk Everist.

The Most Outstanding Player of the tournament was Michael Sharf from California. Additionally, two All-Tournament Teams were named: a First Team (with seven players, including Sharf) and a Second Team (also with seven players).

The tournament's leading scorer, with 4 goals, was Tim Hummel from Loyola Marymount.

== Qualification ==
Since there has only ever been one single national championship for water polo, all NCAA men's water polo programs (whether from Division I, Division II, or Division III) were eligible. A total of 4 teams were invited to contest this championship.

Team	Appearance	Previous
California	25th	2006
Loyola Marymount	5th	2005
Navy	13th	2006
USC	22nd	2006

== Bracket ==
- Site: Avery Aquatic Center, Stanford, California

Semifinals
1	USC	8
4	Loyola Marymount	4
2	California	8
3	Navy	5

Championship
1	USC	6
2	California	8
Third Place
4	Loyola Marymount	6
3	Navy	7

== All-tournament teams ==
=== First Team ===
- Michael Sharf, California (Most outstanding player)
- Tommy Corcoran, USC
- J.W. Krumpholz, USC
- Zac Monsees, California
- Matt Sagehorn, USC
- Mark Sheredy, California
- Jeff Tyrrell, California

=== Second Team ===
- Shea Buckner, USC
- Tim Hummel, Loyola Marymount
- Mike Mulvey, Navy
- Aaron Recko, Navy
- Gabor Sarusi, USC
- Adam Shilling, USC
- Spencer Warden, California

== See also ==
- NCAA Men's Water Polo Championship
- NCAA Women's Water Polo Championship
