= 1997 NCAA Men's Water Polo Championship =

Water polo tournament season

Tournament details
- Dates: December 1997
- Teams: 4

Final positions
- Champions: Pepperdine (1st title)
- Runners-up: USC (6th title game)

Tournament statistics
- Matches played: 4
- Goals scored: 65 (16.25 per match)
- Attendance: 927 (232 per match)
- Top goal scorer(s): Jeremy Pope, Pepperdine (6)

Awards
- Best player: Alan Herrmann, Pepperdine; Merrill Moses, Pepperdine; Jeremy Pope, Pepperdine

The 1997 NCAA Men's Water Polo Championship was the 29th annual NCAA Men's Water Polo Championship to determine the national champion of NCAA men's collegiate water polo. Tournament matches were played at the International Swimming Hall of Fame Aquatics Complex in Fort Lauderdale, Florida, during December 1997.

Pepperdine defeated USC in the final, 8–7 (in two overtimes), to win their first national title. The Waves (25–3) were coached by Terry Schroeder.

The Most Outstanding Players of the tournament, all from Pepperdine, were Alan Herrmann, Merrill Moses, and Jeremy Pope. The All-Tournament Team comprised these three, along with four other players.

The tournament's leading scorer, with 6 goals, was Pope from Pepperdine.

Queens (NY) became the first team from outside the state of California to finish third place in an NCAA men's water polo tournament. The Knights defeated UC Davis in the third-place final, 5–3.

== Qualification ==
Since there has only ever been one single national championship for water polo, all NCAA men's water polo programs (whether from Division I, Division II, or Division III) were eligible. A total of 4 teams were invited to contest this championship.

Team	Appearance	Previous
UC Davis	4th	1996
Pepperdine	13th	1994
Queens (NY)	1st	Never
USC	16th	1995

== Bracket ==
- Site: International Swimming Hall of Fame Aquatics Complex, Fort Lauderdale, Florida

Semifinals
USC	14
Queens (NY)	6
Pepperdine	13
UC Davis	8

Championship
USC	7
Pepperdine (2OT)	8
Third Place
Queens (NY)	5
UC Davis	3

== All-tournament team ==
- Simun Cimerman, USC
- Mike Gottelli, UC Davis
- Alan Herrmann, Pepperdine (Most outstanding player)
- Merrill Moses, Pepperdine (Most outstanding player)
- Marko Pintaric, USC
- Jeremy Pope, Pepperdine (Most outstanding player)
- John Vasek, Queens (NY)

== See also ==
- NCAA Men's Water Polo Championship
