= 2022 NCAA Men's Water Polo Championship =

Collegiate water polo championship

2022 NCAA Men's Water Polo tournament
- Teams: 7
- Format: Single-elimination
- Finals site: Spieker Aquatics Complex; Berkeley, California
- Champions: California (16th title)
- Runner-up: Southern California
- Semifinalists: UCLA; Pacific
- Winning coach: Kirk Everist (5th title)
- MVP: Nikos Papanikolaou (California)
- Television: NCAA and ESPNU

The 2022 NCAA Men's Water Polo Championship occurred from November 26 to December 4, 2022. The first game of the opening round was held at DeNunzio Pool in Princeton, New Jersey and hosted by Princeton University. All subsequent games, including the finals, were held at Spieker Aquatics Complex in Berkeley, California and hosted by the University of California. This was the 54th NCAA Men's Water Polo Championship. Seven teams participated in this championship. Opening round game one was played at Princeton University. The California Golden Bears were the defending national champions.

== Qualifying teams ==
Five conferences were granted automatic qualification to the championship: Golden Coast Conference (GCC), Mid-Atlantic Water Polo Conference (MAWPC), Mountain Pacific Sports Federation (MPSF), Northeast Water Polo Conference (NWPC), and the Western Water Polo Association (WWPA). Two additional teams earned entry into the tournament with at-large bids, with both of them coming from the Mountain Pacific Sports Federation.

Seed	Team	Conference	Bid type	Appearance
1	California	MPSF	At-large	31st
2	UCLA	MPSF	At-large	37th
	Fordham	MAWPC	Automatic	2nd
	Pacific	GCC	Automatic	5th
	Princeton	NWPC	Automatic	8th
	Southern California	MPSF	Automatic	37th
	UC Davis	WWPA	Automatic	9th

== Schedule ==
All times are Eastern time

November 26	December 1	December 3	December 4
Opening Round Game 1	Opening Round Games 2 & 3	Semifinals	Championship
12:00 p.m.	6:00 p.m. & 8:00 p.m.	5:00 p.m. & 7:00 p.m.	6:00 p.m.

== Bracket ==
The championship featured a knockout format where schools that lost were eliminated from the tournament. The championship pairings were announced on Sunday, November 20, 2022 by the NCAA Men’s Water Polo Committee.

Opening Round Game 1
Princeton	11
Fordham	10

Opening Round Games 2–3
Southern California	11
Princeton	8
Pacific	11
UC Davis	7

Semifinals
2	UCLA	12
Southern California	15
1	California	16
Pacific	9

Final
Southern California	12
1	California	13

== All Tournament Team ==
After the championship, the All-NCAA Tournament First and Second teams were announced.

=== First Team ===
- Nikolaos Papanikolaou (Most Outstanding Player, California)
- Max Casabella (California)
- Jack Deely (California)
- Adrian Weinberg (California)
- Jake Ehrhardt (Southern California)
- Nassimo Di Martire (Southern California)
- Mihailo Vukazic (Pacific)

=== Second Team ===
- Roberto Valera (California)
- Kyle McKenney (Southern California)
- Ashworth Molthen (Southern California)
- Jake Cavano (UCLA)
- Gianpiero Di Martire (UCLA)
- Bogdan Djerkovic (Pacific)
- Reuel D’Souza (Pacific)
