= 2003 NCAA Men's Water Polo Championship =

Water polo tournament season

Tournament details
- Dates: December 2003
- Teams: 4

Final positions
- Champions: USC (2nd title)
- Runners-up: Stanford (17th title game)

Tournament statistics
- Matches played: 4
- Goals scored: 71 (17.75 per match)
- Attendance: 4,280 (1,070 per match)
- Top goal scorer(s): Tony Azevedo, Stanford (8)

Awards
- Best player: Tony Azevedo, Stanford (3); Bozidar Damjanovic, USC

The 2003 NCAA Men's Water Polo Championship was the 35th annual NCAA Men's Water Polo Championship to determine the national champion of NCAA men's collegiate water polo. Tournament matches were played at the Avery Aquatic Center in Stanford, California during December 2003.

USC defeated Stanford in the final, 9–7 (in overtime), to win their second national title. The Trojans (24–3) were coached by Jovan Vavic.

The Most Outstanding Players of the tournament were Tony Azevedo (Stanford), who won the award for a record third straight year, and Bozidar Damjanovic (USC). Azevedo and Damjanovic, along with five other players, also comprised the All-Tournament Team.

Azevedo, with 8 goals, was also the tournament's leading scorer.

== Qualification ==
Since there has only ever been one single national championship for water polo, all NCAA men's water polo programs (whether from Division I, Division II, or Division III) were eligible. A total of 4 teams were invited to contest this championship.

Team	Appearance	Previous
Loyola Marymount	2nd	2001
Navy	11th	2000
USC	19th	2000
Stanford	26th	2002

== Bracket ==
- Site: Avery Aquatic Center, Stanford, California

Semifinals
Stanford	14
Loyola Marymount	8
USC	10
Navy	6

Championship
Stanford	7
USC	9^{OT}
Third Place
Loyola Marymount	10
Navy	7

== All-tournament team ==
- Tony Azevedo, Stanford (Most outstanding player)
- Bozidar Damjanovic, USC (Most outstanding player)
- Predrag Damjanov, USC
- Mike Derse, Stanford
- Endre Rex-Kiss, Loyola Marymount
- Peter Varellas, Stanford
- Juraj Zatovic, USC

== See also ==
- NCAA Men's Water Polo Championship
- NCAA Women's Water Polo Championship
