= 2005 NCAA Men's Water Polo Championship =

Water polo tournament season

Tournament details
- Dates: December 3–4, 2005
- Teams: 4

Final positions
- Champions: USC (3rd title)
- Runners-up: Stanford (19th title game)

Tournament statistics
- Matches played: 4
- Goals scored: 56 (14 per match)
- Attendance: 1,656 (414 per match)
- Top goal scorer(s): Cutberto Hernandez, LMU (5)

Awards
- Best player: Adam Shilling, USC; Juraj Zatovic, USC

The 2005 NCAA Men's Water Polo Championship was the 37th annual NCAA Men's Water Polo Championship to determine the national champion of NCAA men's collegiate water polo. Tournament matches were played at the Kinney Natatorium at Bucknell University in Lewisburg, Pennsylvania from December 3–4, 2005.

USC defeated Stanford in the final, 3–2, the game winning goal scored by Pavol Valovic, to win their third national title. The Trojans (26–1) were coached by Jovan Vavic.

The Most Outstanding Players of the tournament were Adam Shilling and Juraj Zatovic from USC. Additionally, two All-Tournament Teams were named: a First Team (with seven players including Shilling and Zatovic) and a Second Team (with eight players).

The tournament's leading scorer, with 5 goals, was Cutberto Hernandez from Loyola Marymount.

== Qualification ==
Since there has only ever been one single national championship for water polo, all NCAA men's water polo programs (whether from Division I, Division II, or Division III) were eligible. A total of 4 teams were invited to contest this championship.

Team	Appearance	Previous
Loyola Marymount	4th	2004
St. Francis Brooklyn	1st	Never
USC	20th	2003
Stanford	28th	2004

== Bracket ==
- Site: Kinney Natatorium, Lewisburg, Pennsylvania

Semifinals
1	USC	14
4	St. Francis Brooklyn	8
2	Stanford	7
3	Loyola Marymount	6

Championship
1	USC	3
2	Stanford	2
Third Place
4	St. Francis Brooklyn	6
3	Loyola Marymount	10

== All-tournament teams ==
=== First Team ===
- Adam Shilling, USC (Most outstanding player)
- Juraj Zatovic, USC (Most outstanding player)
- Juan Delgadillo, USC
- Thomas Hale, USC
- Thomas Hopkins, Stanford
- Endre Rex-Kiss, Loyola Marymount
- Peter Varellas, Stanford

=== Second Team ===
- Tommy Corcoran, USC
- Ian Elliott, Loyola Marymount
- Gergely Fabian, St. Francis Brooklyn
- J.J. Garton, Stanford
- Will Hindle-Katel, Stanford
- Sandy Hohener, Stanford
- Bogdon Petrovic, St. Francis Brooklyn
- Botond Szalma, St. Francis Brooklyn

== See also ==
- NCAA Men's Water Polo Championship
- NCAA Women's Water Polo Championship
