= Vavic =

Vavic is a surname. Notable people with the surname include:

- Jovan Vavic (born 1961 or 1962), Yugoslav water polo coach
- Marko Vavic (born 1999), American water polo player
