= 2018 NCAA men's water polo rankings =

- Season: 2018
- Postseason: Single-elimination
- Preseason #1: UCLA

The 2018 NCAA men's water polo rankings is a human poll designated to rank the top 20 men's college water polo programs at the NCAA Division I, II, and III levels.. The official rankings recognized by the National Collegiate Athletic Association (NCAA) are determined by the Collegiate Water Polo Association (CWPA), and have released rankings for this competition since 2008. The rankings are updated weekly at the beginning of the season and finalized at the conclusion of the 2018 NCAA Men's Water Polo Championship.

== Legend ==
Legend
	Increase in ranking
	Decrease in ranking
	Not ranked previous week
	Selected for NCAA Tournament
Italics	Number of first place votes
(#–#)	Win–loss record
т	Tied with team above or below also with this symbol

== CWPA Poll ==
	Preseason Aug 22	Week 1 Sep 5	Week 2 Sep 12	Week 3 Sep 19	Week 4 Sep 26	Week 5 Oct 3	Week 6 Oct 10	Week 7 Oct 17	Week 8 Oct 24	Week 9 Nov 1	Week 10 Nov 8	Week 11 Nov 15	Week 12 Nov 21	Week 13 Nov 28	Week 14 (Final) Dec 5	
1.	UCLA	USC т	USC	USC	USC	USC	Stanford	USC					Stanford			1.
2.	USC	UCLA т	UCLA	UCLA	UCLA	UCLA	UCLA	Stanford					UCLA т			2.
3.	California	California	California	Stanford	Stanford	Stanford	USC	UCLA					USC т			3.
4.	Stanford	Stanford	Stanford	California	California	California	California	California					California			4.
5.	Pacific	Pacific	Pacific	UC Santa Barbara	UC Santa Barbara	UC Santa Barbara	UC Santa Barbara	UC Santa Barbara					UC Santa Barbara т			5.
6.	Long Beach State	Long Beach State	Long Beach State	Pacific	Pacific	Pacific	Pacific	Pepperdine					Long Beach State т			6.
7.	UC Davis	UC Santa Barbara	UC Santa Barbara	Long Beach State	Harvard	Harvard	UC Davis	Pacific					UC San Diego			7.
8.	Pepperdine	Pepperdine	UC Davis	Harvard т	UC San Diego т	UC San Diego	Pepperdine	Long Beach State					Pacific			8.
9.	UC Irvine	Harvard	Harvard	UC Davis т	UC Davis т	UC Davis	Long Beach State	UC Davis					Pepperdine			9.
10.	UC Santa Barbara	UC Irvine	Pepperdine	Pepperdine	Long Beach State	Long Beach State	Harvard	UC San Diego					UC Davis			10.
11.	Harvard	UC Davis	UC San Diego	UC San Diego	Pepperdine	Pepperdine	UC San Diego	UC Irvine					Loyola Marymount			11.
12.	UC San Diego	UC San Diego	UC Irvine	UC Irvine	Princeton	UC Irvine т	UC Irvine	Princeton					Princeton			12.
13.	Princeton	Princeton	Princeton	Princeton	UC Irvine	Princeton т	Brown	Harvard					Harvard			13.
14.	San Jose State	Bucknell	Bucknell	Bucknell	California Baptist	California Baptist	Princeton	Bucknell					UC Irvine			14.
15.	Brown	San Jose State	George Washington	California Baptist	Bucknell	Pomona–Pitzer	Pomona–Pitzer	California Baptist					California Baptist			15.
16.	California Baptist	California Baptist	Pomona–Pitzer	Pomona–Pitzer	Pomona–Pitzer	San Jose State	California Baptist	Brown т					Bucknell т			16.
17.	Pomona–Pitzer	Brown	San Jose State	San Jose State	San Jose State	George Washington	Bucknell	Pomona–Pitzer т					George Washington т			17.
18.	George Washington	George Washington	California Baptist т	George Washington	Wagner т	Wagner	San Jose State	Loyola Marymount					Santa Clara			18.
19.	St. Francis Brooklyn	Pomona–Pitzer	Brown т	Whittier т	Loyola Marymount т	Loyola Marymount	George Washington	San Jose State					Pomona-Pitzer			19.
20.	Bucknell т	Loyola Marymount	Santa Clara	Brown т	George Washington т	Bucknell	Wagner	George Washington т					St. Francis Brooklyn			20.
	Preseason Aug 22	Week 1 Sep 5	Week 2 Sep 12	Week 3 Sep 19	Week 4 Sep 26	Week 5 Oct 3	Week 6 Oct 10	Week 7 Oct 17	Week 8 Oct 24	Week 9 Nov 1	Week 10 Nov 8	Week 11 Nov 15	Week 12 Nov 21	Week 13 Nov 28	Week 14 (Final) Dec 5	
		Dropped: St. Francis Brooklyn	Dropped: Loyola Marymount	Dropped: Santa Clara	Dropped: Brown	Dropped: Whittier	Dropped: Loyola Marymount	Dropped: Wagner	None	None	None	None	None	None	None	
