= 2024 NCAA Men's Water Polo Championship =

Collegiate water polo championship

2024 NCAA Men's Water Polo tournament
- Teams: 8
- Format: Single-elimination
- Finals site: Avery Aquatic Center; Stanford, California
- Champions: UCLA (13th title)
- Runner-up: Southern California
- Semifinalists: Stanford; Fordham
- Winning coach: Adam Wright (5th title)
- MVP: Ryder Dodd (UCLA)
- Television: NCAA and ESPNU

The 2024 NCAA Men's Water Polo Championship occurred from December 6–8, 2024, in Stanford, California at the Avery Aquatic Center and hosted by Stanford University. This was the 56th NCAA Men's Water Polo Championship. The California Golden Bears were the defending national champions. After winning three consecutive national titles from 2021 to 2023, California failed to qualify for the 2024 championship, ensuring that a new national champion would be crowned.

== Qualifying teams ==
Six conferences were granted automatic qualification to the championship: Big West Conference (Big West), Mid-Atlantic Water Polo Conference (MAWPC), Mountain Pacific Sports Federation (MPSF), Northeast Water Polo Conference (NWPC), West Coast Conference (WCC), and the Western Water Polo Association (WWPA). Two additional teams earned entry into the tournament with at-large bids, with both of them coming from the Mountain Pacific Sports Federation.

Seed	Team	Conference	Bid type	Appearance
1	UCLA	MPSF	At-large	39th
2	Southern California	MPSF	Automatic	39th
3	Fordham	MAWPC	Automatic	4th
4	Stanford	MPSF	At-large	35th
	California Baptist	WCC	Automatic	2nd
	Long Beach State	Big West	Automatic	14th
	Princeton	NWPC	Automatic	10th
	Salem (WV)	WWPA	Automatic	1st

== Schedule ==
All times are Eastern time

December 6	December 6	December 7	December 8
First Round Games 1 & 2	First Round Games 3 & 4	Semifinals	Championship
3:00 p.m. & 5:00 p.m.	7:00 p.m. & 9:00 p.m.	5:00 p.m. & 7:00 p.m.	6:00 p.m.

== Bracket ==
The championship featured a knockout format where schools that lost were eliminated from the tournament. The championship pairings were announced on Monday, November 25, 2024, by the NCAA Men’s Water Polo Committee.

First round Friday, December 6, 2024
1	UCLA	22
Salem (WV)	6
4	Stanford	15
Princeton	8
2	Southern California	17
California Baptist	13
3	Fordham	16
Long Beach State	11

Semifinals; Saturday, December 7, 2024
1	UCLA	17
4	Stanford	14
2	Southern California	18
3	Fordham	16

Championship; Sunday, December 8, 2024
1	UCLA	11
2	Southern California	8

== All Tournament Team ==
After the championship, the All-NCAA Tournament First and Second teams were announced.

=== First Team ===
- Ryder Dodd (Most Outstanding Player, UCLA)
- Chase Dodd (UCLA)
- Frederico Jucá Carsalade (UCLA)
- Robert López Duart (Southern California)
- Max Miller (Southern California)
- Bernardo Herzer (Southern California)
- Soren Jensen (Stanford)

=== Second Team ===
- Jack Larsen (UCLA)
- Andrej Grurevic (Southern California)
- Luca Provenziani (Fordham)
- Riley Pittman (Stanford)
- Roko Pozaric (Princeton)
- Caleb Teraoka (California Baptist)
- William Whitstone (California Baptist)
