= 2017 NCAA Men's Water Polo Championship =

2017 Men's water polo Championship

2017 NCAA Men's Water Polo tournament
- Teams: 8
- Format: Single-elimination
- Finals site: Uytengsu Aquatics Center; Los Angeles, California
- Champions: UCLA Bruins (11th title, 20th title game, 30th Final Four)
- Runner-up: USC Trojans (22nd title game, 27th Final Four)
- Semifinalists: Pacific Tigers (2nd Final Four); California Golden Bears (28th Final Four)
- Winning coach: Adam Wright (3rd title)
- MVP: Alex Wolf ((UCLA))
- Television: NCAA

The 2017 NCAA Men's Water Polo Championship occurred from November 25, 2017, to December 3rd in Los Angeles at the Uytengsu Aquatics Center. This was the 49th NCAA Men's Water Polo Championship. Eight teams across from all divisions participated in this championship.

== Schedule ==
November 25	November 30	December 2	December 3
First Round	Quarterfinals	Semifinals	Championship

== Qualification ==
The six-member selection committee selects eight institutions based on a wide number of factors, primarily number of wins, rigor of schedule, level of availability, an indication of an upward trend or winning consistently, and RPI.

Institution	Conference	Record	Appearance	Last bid
California	MPSF	20–3	29th	2016
George Washington	A-10	17–11	1st	—
Harvard	Ivy League	23–7	2nd	2016
Pacific	WCC	19–5	3rd	2013
Pomona–Pitzer	SCIAC	24–10	2nd	2016
UC Davis	Big West	22–6	6th	2016
UCLA	MPSF	19–4	33rd	2016
USC	MPSF	25–3	32nd	2016

== Seeding ==
Likewise with the criteria mentioned above, seeding was based on level of ranking, geographic proximity to the finals site, and a projected low level of academic commitments missed. The pots outlined feature what level in the championship institutions competed in, ranging from competing away in the first round for Pot 4 to skipping to the semifinals in Pot 1.

Pot 1	Pot 2	Pot 3	Pot 4
UCLA	UC Davis	Pacific	Pomona–Pitzer
California	USC	Harvard	George Washington

== Bracket ==
The championship featured a knockout format where schools that lost were eliminated from the tournament.

First Round
25 November – Stockton
Pacific	16
Pomona–Pitzer	2
UC Davis – Bye	0
UC Davis – Bye	0
UCLA – Bye	0
UCLA – Bye	0
UCLA – Bye	0
UCLA – Bye	0
California – Bye	0
California – Bye	0
California – Bye	0
California – Bye	0
USC – Bye	0
USC – Bye	0
25 November – Cambridge
Harvard	15
George Washington	13

Quarterfinals
30 November – Los Angeles
Pacific	13
UC Davis	12
UCLA – Bye	0
UCLA – Bye	0
California – Bye	0
California – Bye	0
30 November – Los Angeles
USC	16
Harvard	4

Semifinals
2 December – Los Angeles
Pacific	9
UCLA	11
2 December – Los Angeles
California	11
USC	12

Championship
3 December – Los Angeles
UCLA	7
USC	5

Harvard's play-in win over George Washington was the first-ever victory for a school outside California in a non-consolation game in tournament history. (As of 2019, however, California schools still maintain a perfect record against teams outside the state.)

== Honors ==
The following distinctions were distributed concluding the championship to athletes that had superior performance of some kind in the championship.

=== All-tournament Teams ===
First Team

Athlete	Institution
Luca Cupido	California
Blake Edwards	USC
Max Irving	UCLA
Matteo Morelli	USC
Alex Roelse	UCLA
Marko Vavic	USC
Alex Wolf (MVP)	UCLA

Second Team

Athlete	Institution
McQuin Baron	USC
Matt Farmer	UCLA
John Hooper	California
Luke Pavillard	Pacific
Nicolas Saveljic	UCLA
Ben Stevenson	Pacific
James Walters	USC

=== Tournament scoring leader ===
Athlete	Institution	Goals
Luke Pavillard	Pacific	10

=== Team rankings ===
Institution	Ranking
UCLA	No. 1
USC	No. 2
California	No. 3
Pacific	No. 4
UC Davis	No. 5
Harvard	No. 6
George Washington	No. 7
Pomona–Pitzer	No. 8
