= Canyonview Aquatic Center =

Aquatics complex at the University of California, San Diego

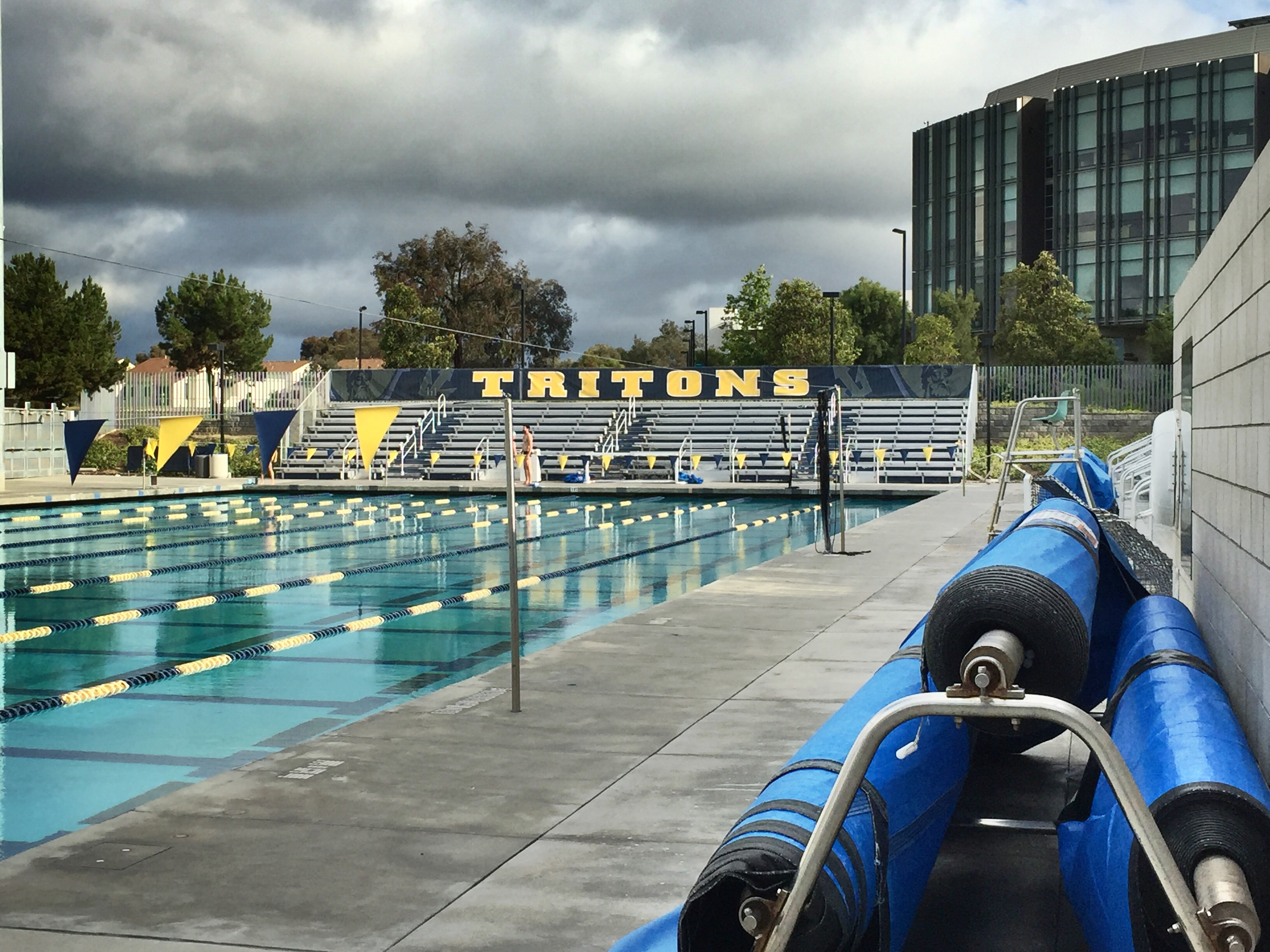
- The west pool and bleachers
- Interactive map of Canyonview Aquatic Center
- Address: La Jolla, California
- Coordinates: 32.880485°N 117.2318116°W
- Capacity: 2,336

Construction
- Built: 1982
- Opened: 1983

Tenant
- UC San Diego Tritons

Canyonview Aquatic Center is an aquatic complex in San Diego, California, located on the campus of the University of California, San Diego. It is the home of the UC San Diego Tritons men's and women's water polo and men's and women's swimming & diving teams. The complex comprises two Olympic-size swimming pools, bleacher seating, and fitness facilities.

== History ==
In June 1982, construction began on a recreation center to supplement the forthcoming student housing in Earl Warren College and ease pressure on the original natatorium facility in Muir College. This recreation center would include a 50-meter Olympic-size pool, an outdoor whirlpool bath, four racquetball courts, and locker rooms with showers. Upon its completion in spring 1983, the $1.8 million project housed the only publicly accessible long-course pool in San Diego. In 1995, two racquetball courts were converted into an indoor climbing and bouldering facility. In 2003, citing increased strain on the Natatorium and existing pool, UCSD began construction on a second long-course pool which would include seating for 1,000 and a new weight room and allow for more recreational swim hours. This West Pool was completed in February 2006.

== Facilities ==
=== West Pool ===
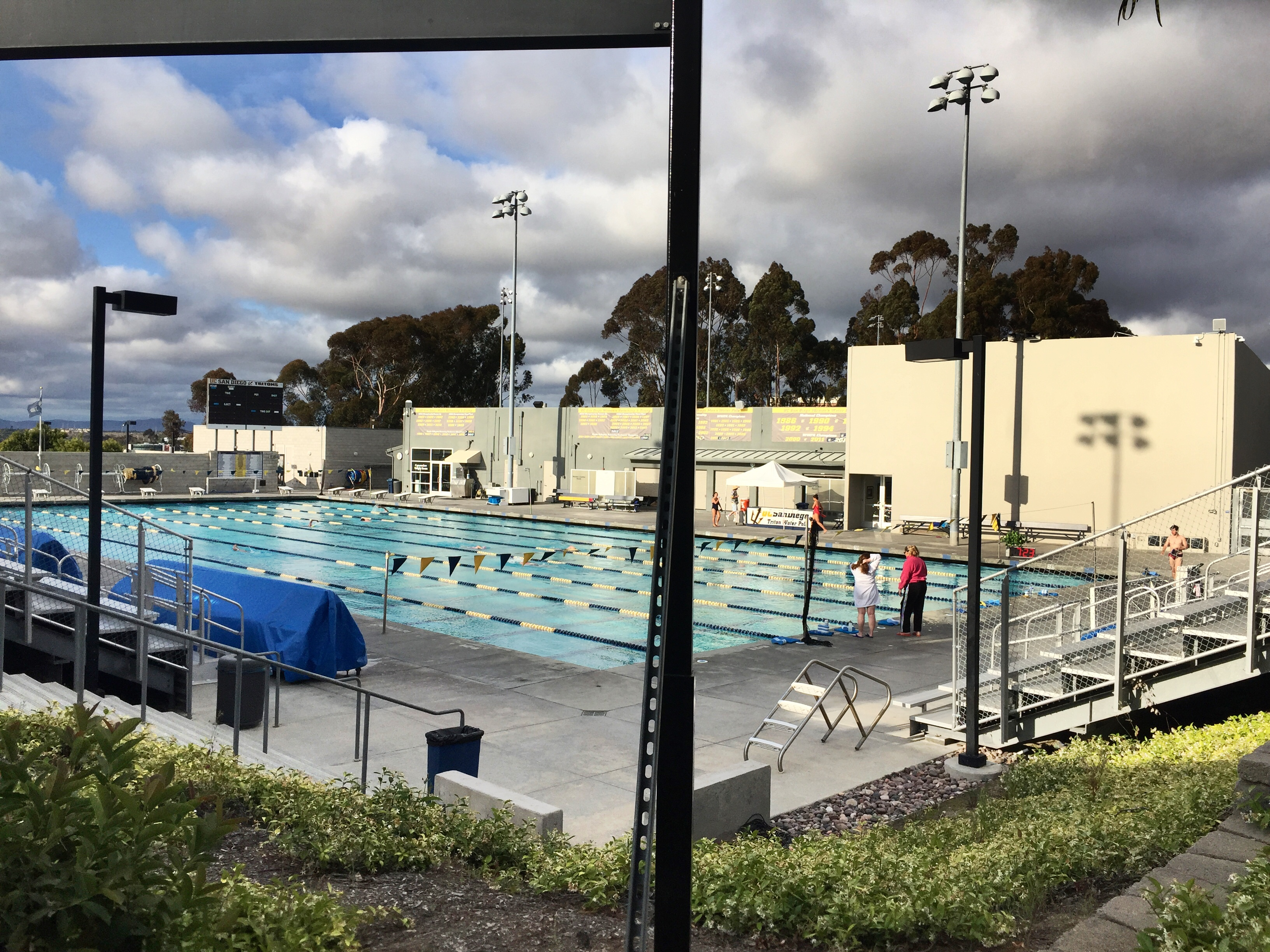
The west pool and recreation facility

The West Pool is the home pool of the Triton water polo and swimming teams. It is 50 meters long and 25 yards wide, with a uniform depth of 7 feet. It was designed by the firm of Hanna Gabriel Wells and opened in 2006. There is bleacher seating for 1,000 along the south and west edges. The pool is heated year-round.

=== East Pool ===
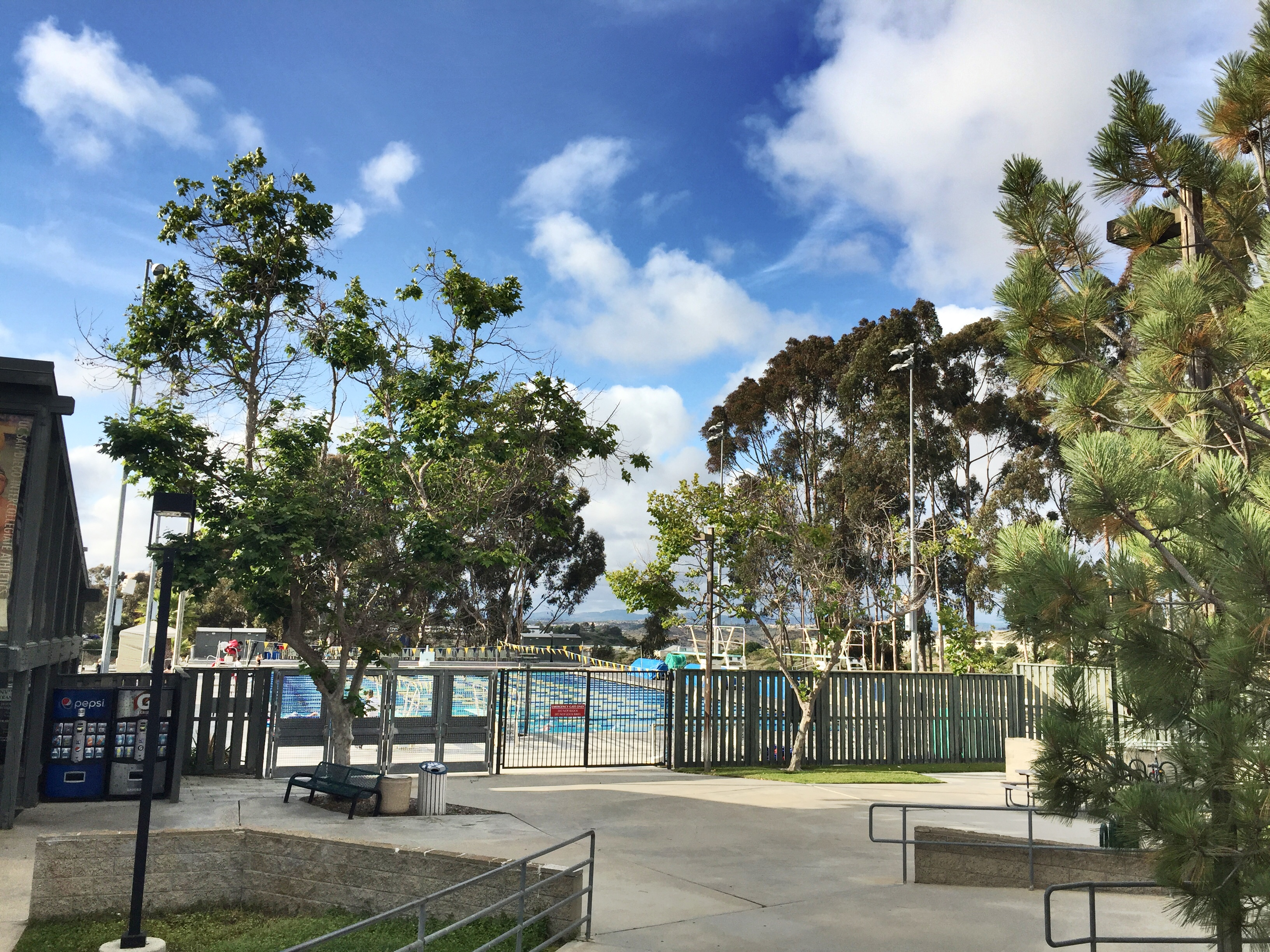
The complex entrance and east pool

The East Pool is the home pool of the Triton swimming and diving teams. It is 50 meters long and 25 yards wide, with five diving boards along the south edge and an adjacent hot tub. It features bleacher seating for 336 and lawn space for an additional 1,000 spectators. The pool entered the Guinness Book of World Records when 26 continuous hours of water polo were played there on April 7–8, 1989.

=== Weight room and climbing center ===
The 1850 square foot weight room is housed in the location of the original Canyonview pump, which was relocated with the construction of the West Pool. It primarily features lifting equipment chosen specifically for aquatic training. The southern part of the building houses the Outback Climbing Center.

== Notable events ==
In 1996, 1999, and 2014, Canyonview hosted the NCAA Men's Water Polo Championship. In 2003, it hosted the NCAA Women's Water Polo Championship.
