= 2020 NCAA Men's Water Polo Championship =

2020 NCAA Men's Water Polo tournament
- Teams: 6
- Format: Single-elimination
- Finals site: Uytengsu Aquatics Center; Los Angeles, California
- Champions: UCLA Bruins (12th title, 21st title game, 32nd Final Four)
- Runner-up: USC Trojans (25th title game, 30th Final Four)
- Semifinalists: California Golden Bears (29th Final Four); Stanford Cardinal (30th Final Four)
- Winning coach: Adam Wright (4th title)
- MVP: Nicolas Saveljic (UCLA)
- Television: NCAA

The 2020 NCAA Men's Water Polo Championship occurred from March 18–21, 2021 in Los Angeles, California, at the Uytengsu Aquatics Center. This was the 52nd NCAA Men's Water Polo Championship. Six teams participated in this championship. Although this was the 2020 championship, it was played in 2021 because of the COVID-19 pandemic. The rankings before the tournament: No. 1 Stanford, No. 2 California, No. 3 UCLA and No. 4 USC.

== Schedule ==
March 18	March 20	March 21
Opening Round	Semifinals	Championship

== Bracket ==
The championship featured a knockout format where schools that lost were eliminated from the tournament.

Opening Round
UCLA	19
California Baptist	14
USC	18
Bucknell	9

Semifinals
Stanford	10
UCLA	11
California	10
USC	12

National Championship
UCLA	7
USC	6

== Qualification ==
Automatic qualifications (AQ) were awarded to six conferences. Three conferences, the Golden Coast Conference (GCC), Northeast Water Polo Conference (NWPC) and the Southern California Intercollegiate Athletic Conference (SCIAC) withdrew their automatic qualification. Participating in this year's tournament were teams from the Collegiate Water Polo Association (CWPA), Mountain Pacific Sports Federation (MPSF), and the Western Water Polo Association (WWPA). Automatic qualification teams were Bucknell (CWPA), California Baptist (WWPA), and Stanford (MPSF). At-large bids were awarded to California, UCLA and USC from MPSF.

== All-NCAA Tournament ==
First Team

- Jake Cavano, UCLA
- Jake Ehrhardt, USC
- Bernardo Maurizi, UCLA
- Jacob Mercep, USC
- Nicolas Saveljic, UCLA (MVP)

Second Team

- Tommy Gruwell, UCLA
- Carson Kranz, USC
- Nic Porter, USC
