= 2001 NCAA Men's Water Polo Championship =

Water polo tournament season

Tournament details
- Dates: December 2001
- Teams: 4

Final positions
- Champions: Stanford (9th title)
- Runners-up: UCLA (13th title game)

Tournament statistics
- Matches played: 4
- Goals scored: 57 (14.25 per match)
- Attendance: 4,503 (1,126 per match)
- Top goal scorer(s): Kevin Witt, LMU (6)

Awards
- Best player: Tony Azevedo, Stanford

The 2001 NCAA Men's Water Polo Championship was the 33rd annual NCAA Men's Water Polo Championship to determine the national champion of NCAA men's collegiate water polo. Tournament matches were played at Avery Aquatic Center in Stanford, California during December 2001.

Stanford defeated UCLA in the final, 8–5, to win their ninth national title. The Cardinal (22–1) were coached by Dante Dettamanti.

The Most Outstanding Player of the tournament was Tony Azevedo from Stanford. Azevedo, along with six other players, comprised the All-Tournament Team.

Kevin Witt, from Loyola Marymount, was the tournament's leading scorer, with 6 goals.

== Qualification ==
Since there has only ever been one single national championship for water polo, all NCAA men's water polo programs (whether from Division I, Division II, or Division III) were eligible. A total of 4 teams were invited to contest this championship.

Team	Appearance	Previous
Loyola Marymount	1st	Never
Massachusetts	7th	1999
Stanford	24th	1999
UCLA	25th	2000

== Bracket ==
- Site: Avery Aquatic Center, Stanford, California

Semifinals
Stanford	8
Massachusetts	4
UCLA	7
Loyola Marymount	5

Championship
Stanford	8
UCLA	5
Third Place
Massachusetts	6
Loyola Marymount	14

== All-tournament team ==
- Tony Azevedo, Stanford (Most outstanding player)
- Nick Ellis, Stanford
- Matt Flesher, UCLA
- Peter Hudnut, Stanford
- Jeff Nesmith, Stanford
- Brett Ormsby, UCLA
- Kevin Witt, Loyola Marymount

== See also ==
- NCAA Men's Water Polo Championship
- NCAA Women's Water Polo Championship
