= Thalia Munro =

American water polo player (born 1982)

Thalia Ormbsy (Munro)
Personal information
- Full name: Thalia Janina Ormbsy (Munro)
- Born: March 8, 1982 (age 44) Santa Barbara, California, U.S.
Medal record
Women's water polo
Representing the United States
Olympic Games
Bronze medal – third place	2004 Athens	Team competition
World Championships
Gold medal – first place	2003 Barcelona	Team competition
Silver medal – second place	2005 Montréal	Team competition

Thalia Janina Ormbsy (Munro) (born March 8, 1982) is an American water polo player for the UCLA Bruins and the US National Team, who won the bronze medal at the 2004 Athens Olympics. Her position is utility/driver. She now is a 6th grade teacher.

She married water polo player Brett Ormsby who participated for the United States men's national water polo team at the 2004 Summer Olympics.

== High school and college ==
Ormbsy (Munro) varsity lettered four years at Santa Barbara High School in water polo, three years in swimming and two years in volleyball. She earned California Interscholastic Federation Division II Most Valuable Player in 1999 and 2000.

In her first two years at UCLA, Ormbsy (Munro) scored 40 goals, and led the team as a sophomore with 23 assists. For the 2003–2004 seasons, she redshirted to train with the US National team for the 2004 Summer Olympics in Athens. Upon returning in 2005, she was named a first team American Water Polo Coaches Association All-American, as well as to the first All-NCAA Women's Water Polo Championship team. Ormbsy (Munro) led her UCLA Bruins team in field saves with 19 and was second both in steals with 69 and in goals with 53.

As a senior in 2006, she was third on the team in scoring with 35 goals and second on team in steals and assists. Ormbsy's (Munro) honors again included first team All-NCAA Tournament Team, once the third-seeded Bruins (29–4) won their second consecutive national title and fourth in the six years that the NCAA has sponsored a tournament. Ormbsy (Munro) amassed 128 goals in her four-year career as a utility player and was a member of three championship teams – 2003, 2005 and 2006 – finishing sixth among UCLA's all-time leaders for goals scored.

Year	Goals	Attempts	Percentage
2001	14	40	35
2002	26	50	52
2005	53	118	45
2006	35	62	55
Totals	128	270	

== International and Olympics ==
Thalia Ormbsy (Munro) received 1998 Most Valuable Player at the Olympic Training Center in Colorado Springs with the National Youth Team. In 1999, she was named Junior Nationals First-Team All-American and Senior Nationals Second-Team All-American. Munro was chosen a member of the 2002–2004 U.S. Senior National Team and helped Team USA earn first place in 2003 Holiday Cup, 2003 Pan American Games and 2003 FINA World Championships. Scored one goal in the Olympics against Italy and won a bronze medal with USA team.

== Personal ==
- Ormbsy (Munro) is a psychology major at UCLA.

== See also ==
- List of Olympic medalists in water polo (women)
- List of world champions in women's water polo
- List of World Aquatics Championships medalists in water polo
