= NCAA men's water polo championship =

American college sports tournament

- Association: NCAA
- Sport: Collegiate Water polo
- Founded: 1969; 57 years ago
- Division: Division I and Division II
- No. of teams: 8
- Country: United States
- Most recent champion: UCLA (14th title)
- Most titles: California (17)
- Website: NCAA.com

The NCAA men's water polo championship is an annual tournament organized by the National Collegiate Athletic Association to determine the national champion of men's collegiate water polo among its member programs in the United States. It has been held every year since 1969, except 2020 when it was postponed to March 2021 due to the COVID-19 pandemic.

With a limited number of NCAA water polo programs at the national level, all men's teams, whether from Division I, Division II, or Division III, were eligible to compete each year. In 2019, Division III separated and created its own national championship, despite there only being 17 Division III schools that sponsor men's water polo. Currently, there are only 37 men's water polo teams between Division I and Division II.

The tournament was expanded from a four-team bracket in 2013 by adding two play-in games that are contested by the bottom four seeds, effectively creating a six-team bracket with a first-round bye for the top two teams. Starting with the 2023 tournament, the number of teams was increased to eight teams. Even with this expansion, the men's water polo tournament remains the smallest across all NCAA sports.

While the championship often includes teams from around the country, most programs are located within the state of California, and no school from outside California has ever surpassed third place or participated in the NCAA Men's Water Polo Championship game.

The four California based power conference schools have been the most successful. The University of California, Berkeley is the most successful program with 17 titles, followed by UCLA with 14 titles, Stanford (11 titles), and USC (10 titles). One of these four schools has won the championship every year since 1998.

== Results ==
NCAA Men's Water Polo Championship
Year	Site	Pool/Natatorium	Championship Results		
Year	Site	Pool/Natatorium	Champion	Score	Runner-up
1969	Long Beach, CA	Belmont Plaza Pool	UCLA	5–2	California
1970	Long Beach, CA	Belmont Plaza Pool	UC Irvine	7–6 (3OT)	UCLA
1971	Long Beach, CA	Belmont Plaza Pool	UCLA (2)	5–3	San Jose State
1972	Albuquerque, NM	Armond H. Seidler Natatorium	UCLA (3)	10–5	UC Irvine
1973	Long Beach, CA	Belmont Plaza Pool	California	8–4	UC Irvine
1974	Long Beach, CA	Belmont Plaza Pool	California (2)	7–6	UC Irvine
1975	Long Beach, CA	Belmont Plaza Pool	California (3)	9–8	UC Irvine
1976	Long Beach, CA	Belmont Plaza Pool	Stanford	13–12	UCLA
1977	Providence, RI	Smith Swim Center	California (4)	8–6	UC Irvine
1978	Long Beach, CA	Belmont Plaza Pool	Stanford (2)	7–6 (3OT)	California
1979	Long Beach, CA	Belmont Plaza Pool	UC Santa Barbara	11–3	UCLA
1980	Long Beach, CA	Belmont Plaza Pool	Stanford (3)	8–6	California
1981	Long Beach, CA	Belmont Plaza Pool	Stanford (4)	17–6	Long Beach State
1982	Long Beach, CA	Belmont Plaza Pool	UC Irvine (2)	7–4	Stanford
1983	Long Beach, CA	Belmont Plaza Pool	California (5)	10–7	USC
1984	Long Beach, CA	Belmont Plaza Pool	California (6)	9–8	Stanford
1985	Long Beach, CA	Belmont Plaza Pool	Stanford (5)	12–11 (2OT)	UC Irvine
1986	Long Beach, CA	Belmont Plaza Pool	Stanford (6)	9–6	California
1987	Long Beach, CA	Belmont Plaza Pool	California (7)	9–8 (OT)	USC
1988	Long Beach, CA	Belmont Plaza Pool	California (8)	14–11	UCLA
1989	Indianapolis, IN	Indiana University Natatorium	UC Irvine (3)	9–8	California
1990	Long Beach, CA	Belmont Plaza Pool	California (9)	8–7	Stanford
1991	Long Beach, CA	Belmont Plaza Pool	California (10)	7–6	UCLA
1992	Long Beach, CA	Belmont Plaza Pool	California (11)	12–11 (3OT)	Stanford
1993	Long Beach, CA	Belmont Plaza Pool	Stanford (7)	11–9	USC
1994	Long Beach, CA	Belmont Plaza Pool	Stanford (8)	14–10	USC
1995	Stanford, CA	deGuerre Pool Complex	UCLA (4)	10–8	California
1996	La Jolla, San Diego, CA	Canyonview Pool	UCLA (5)	8–7	USC
1997	Fort Lauderdale, FL	International Swimming Hall of Fame; Aquatics Complex	Pepperdine	8–7 (2OT)	USC
1998	Newport Beach, CA	Marian Bergeson Aquatic Center	USC	9–8 (2OT)	Stanford
1999	La Jolla, San Diego, CA	Canyonview Pool	UCLA (6)	6–5	Stanford
2000	Malibu, CA	Raleigh Runnels Memorial Pool	UCLA (7)	11–2	UC San Diego
2001	Stanford, CA	Avery Aquatic Center	Stanford (9)	8–5	UCLA
2002	Los Angeles, CA	Burns Aquatics Center	Stanford (10)	7–6	California
2003	Stanford, CA	Avery Aquatic Center	USC (2)	9–7 (2OT)	Stanford
2004	Stanford, CA	Avery Aquatic Center	UCLA (8)	10–9 (OT)	Stanford
2005	Lewisburg, PA	Kinney Natatorium	USC (3)	3–2	Stanford
2006	Los Angeles, CA	Burns Aquatics Center	California (12)	7–6	USC
2007	Stanford, CA	Avery Aquatic Center	California (13)	8–6	USC
2008	Stanford, CA	Avery Aquatic Center	USC (4)	7–5	Stanford
2009	Princeton, NJ	DeNunzio Pool	USC (5)	7–6	UCLA
2010	Berkeley, CA	Spieker Aquatics Complex	USC (6)	12–10 (OT)	California
2011	Berkeley, CA	Spieker Aquatics Complex	USC (7)	7–4	UCLA
2012	Los Angeles, CA	McDonald's Swim Stadium	USC (8)	11–10	UCLA
2013	Stanford, CA	Avery Aquatic Center	USC (9)	12–11 (2OT)	Pacific
2014	La Jolla, San Diego, CA	Canyonview Pool	UCLA (9)	9–8	USC
2015	Los Angeles, CA	Spieker Aquatics Center	UCLA (10)	10–7	USC
2016	Berkeley, CA	Spieker Aquatics Complex	California (14)	11–8 (2OT)	USC
2017	Los Angeles, CA	Uytengsu Aquatics Center	UCLA (11)	7–5	USC
2018	Stanford, CA	Avery Aquatic Center	USC (10)	14–12	Stanford
2019	Stockton, CA	Chris Kjeldsen Pool Complex	Stanford (11)	13–8	Pacific
2020 (Note: The championship was held in March, 2021 because of the COVID-19 pandemic.)	Los Angeles, CA	Uytengsu Aquatics Center	UCLA (12)	7–6	USC
2021	Los Angeles, CA	Spieker Aquatics Center	California (15)	13–12	USC
2022	Berkeley, CA	Spieker Aquatics Complex	California (16)	13–12	USC
2023	Los Angeles, CA	Uytengsu Aquatics Center	California (17)	13–11	UCLA
2024	Stanford, CA	Avery Aquatic Center	UCLA (13)	11–8	USC
2025	Stanford, CA	Avery Aquatic Center	UCLA (14)	11–10	USC
2026	La Jolla, San Diego, CA	Canyonview Pool		Texas State	3-1
2027	Davis, CA	Schaal Aquatics Center			

== Champions ==
Schools that have won the NCAA Championship
17, 14, 11, 10, 3, 1

=== Team titles ===
Team	#	Years
California	17	1973, 1974, 1975, 1977, 1983, 1984, 1987, 1988, 1990, 1991, 1992, 2006, 2007, 2016, 2021, 2022, 2023
UCLA	14	1969, 1971, 1972, 1995, 1996, 1999, 2000, 2004, 2014, 2015, 2017, 2020, 2024, 2025
Stanford	11	1976, 1978, 1980, 1981, 1985, 1986, 1993, 1994, 2001, 2002, 2019
USC	10	1998, 2003, 2005, 2008, 2009, 2010, 2011, 2012, 2013, 2018
UC Irvine	3	1970, 1982, 1989
Pepperdine	1	1997
UC Santa Barbara	1	1979

== Appearances by team ==
Key

- CH National Champion
- RU National Runner-up
- SF Semifinals
- QF Quarterfinals (8 teams 1969 to 1994, 2023-Present, 2 teams 2013 to 2022)
- • Opening Round (1 or 2 teams since 2015, except for 2020)

School	Conference (as of 2026)	#	QF	SF	CG	CH	69	70	71	72	73	74	75	76	77	78	79	80	81	82	83	84	85	86	87	88	89	90	91	92	93	94	95	96	97	98	99	00	01	02	03	04	05	06	07	08	09	10	11	12	13	14	15	16	17	18	19	20	21	22	23	24	25
California	MPSF	33	33	33	25	17	RU				CH	CH	CH		CH	RU	SF	RU	SF	SF	CH	CH		RU	CH	CH	RU	CH	CH	CH	SF	SF	RU							RU				CH	CH			RU					SF	CH	SF			SF	CH	CH	CH		
UCLA	MPSF	40	40	37	24	14	CH	RU	CH	CH	SF	SF	SF	RU			RU		QF	SF	QF	QF	SF	SF	SF	RU		SF	RU			SF	CH	CH			CH	CH	RU			CH					RU		RU	RU		CH	CH	SF	CH	SF		CH	SF	SF	RU	CH	CH
Stanford	MPSF	36	36	32	22	11		QF	QF			QF	SF	CH	SF	CH	SF	CH	CH	RU		RU	CH	CH	QF	SF	SF	RU		RU	CH	CH				RU	RU		CH	CH	RU	RU	RU			RU					SF	SF				RU	CH	SF				SF	SF
USC	MPSF	40	40	35	27	10	QF	QF		SF	SF							QF		QF	RU	SF		QF	RU	SF				SF	RU	RU		RU	RU	CH		SF			CH		CH	RU	RU	CH	CH	CH	CH	CH	CH	RU	RU	RU	RU	CH	SF	RU	RU	RU	SF	RU	RU
UC Irvine	Big West	22	22	18	8	3	QF	CH	QF	SF	RU	RU	RU	SF	RU	SF		SF	SF	CH	SF		RU		SF	QF	CH		SF	SF	SF																														QF		
Pepperdine	West Coast	13	13	9	1	1									SF	SF		SF				SF		SF	QF		SF	QF	SF	QF		QF			CH																						SF						
UC Santa Barbara	Big West	12	12	5	1	1	SF	QF		QF	QF	QF		SF			CH	QF	QF	QF			SF					SF																																			
Pacific	West Coast	5	5	4	2	-																									QF																				RU				SF		RU			SF			
San Jose State	West Coast	6	6	3	2	-		SF	RU	RU	QF																																																		QF		QF
UC San Diego	Big West	15	15	10	1	-																					QF		QF	QF	QF		SF			SF	SF	RU		SF				SF					SF		QF	SF	SF			SF							
Long Beach State	Big West	14	14	5	1	-	SF	SF	SF		QF		QF						RU		SF		QF			QF	QF		QF																											QF			QF			QF	
Loyola Marymount	West Coast	8	8	8	-	-																																	SF		SF	SF	SF		SF	SF	SF	SF															
Navy	CWPA	14	14	5	-	-																QF		QF	QF	QF		QF	QF	QF	QF	QF						SF			SF			SF	SF	SF																	
UMass	defunct	7	7	5	-	-																									QF	QF	SF	SF		SF	SF		SF																								
Princeton	CWPA	11	10	4	-	-																								QF												SF					SF		SF				QF			•			QF	QF	SF	QF	QF
St. Francis Brooklyn	defunct	4	4	4	-	-																																					SF					SF		SF	SF												
UC Davis	West Coast	10	10	3	-	-						QF	QF																					SF	SF																			QF	QF		QF		SF	QF			QF
Fordham	CWPA	5	3	2	-	-																																																					•	•	QF	SF	SF
Cal State Fullerton	Big West	2	2	2	-	-			SF			SF																																																			
Queens (NY)	defunct	2	2	2	-	-																													SF					SF																							
Air Force	West Coast	8	8	1	-	-						QF				QF	QF		QF					QF				QF				QF																		SF													
Harvard	CWPA	3	2	1	-	-																																																SF	QF		•						
Brown	CWPA	12	12	-	-	-									QF		QF		QF	QF	QF	QF	QF	QF	QF		QF	QF																								QF											
Loyola Chicago	defunct	10	10	-	-	-				QF				QF	QF	QF	QF	QF		QF	QF	QF	QF																																								
Bucknell	CWPA	8	7	-	-	-									QF	QF	QF	QF					QF																															•			QF	QF					
New Mexico	defunct	3	3	-	-	-			QF	QF	QF																																																				
Arizona	defunct	3	3	-	-	-							QF	QF	QF																																																
Colorado State	defunct	2	2	-	-	-	QF	QF																																																							
Yale	defunct	2	2	-	-	-	QF			QF																																																					
Texas A&M	defunct	2	2	-	-	-								QF		QF																																															
Slippery Rock	defunct	2	2	-	-	-															QF								QF																																		
Little Rock	defunct	2	2	-	-	-																				QF	QF																																				
Whittier	SCIAC	2	2	-	-	-																																													QF	QF											
California Baptist	West Coast	2	2	-	-	-																																																				QF				QF	
Pomona–Pitzer	SCIAC	3	1	-	-	-																																																QF	•	•							
George Washington	CWPA	2	1	-	-	-																																																	•	QF							
Washington	defunct	1	1	-	-	-			QF																																																						
Army	defunct	1	1	-	-	-							QF																																																		
Pittsburgh	defunct	1	1	-	-	-								QF																																																	
Claremont-Mudd-Scripps	SCIAC	1	1	-	-	-																																															QF										
Biola	WWPA	1	1	-	-	-																																																							QF		
Salem (WV)	WWPA	1	1	-	-	-																																																								QF	
Concordia Irvine	WWPA	1	1	-	-	-																																																									QF

== Recent championships ==
=== 2009 ===
Semifinals scores (Princeton University, December 5, 3:00 pm and 5:00 pm (ET)):

- #1 USC 13 vs. #4 Princeton 3; #2 UCLA 9 vs. #3 Loyola Marymount 8 (2 OT)

National Championship (Princeton University, December 6, 2:00 pm (ET)):

- #1 USC (25–2) vs. #2 UCLA (23–6)

Semi-finals
December 5, 3:00 pm
#1 USC	13
#4 Princeton	3
December 5, 5:00 pm
#2 UCLA	9
#3 Loyola Marymount	8 (2 OT)

Final
December 6, 2:00 pm
#1 USC	7
#2 UCLA	6
Third place

2009 NCAA All-Tournament Teams:

- First-Team – Shea Buckner, USC; Scott Davidson, UCLA; Ben Hohl, UCLA; Tibor Forai, LMU; J. W. Krumpholz, USC; Andy Stevens, LMU; Jordan Thompson, USC (MVP)
- Second-Team – Edgaras Asajavicius, LMU; Matt Hale, Princeton; Cullen Hennessy, UCLA; Chay Lapin, UCLA; Matt Sagehorn, USC; Josh Samuels, UCLA; Eric Vreeland, Princeton; Griffin White, UCLA; Mark Zalewski, Princeton

=== 2010 ===
Semifinals (December 4, 2010, Spieker Aquatics Complex, University of California, Berkeley, California)

- USC def. St. Francis (NY) 10–7
- California def. Loyola Marymount 7–6

Championship (December 5, 2010, Spieker Aquatics Complex, University of California, Berkeley, California)

- USC def. California 12-10 (OT)

Semi-finals
December 4
USC	10
St. Francis (NY)	7
December 4
Cal	7
Loyola Marymount	6

Final
December 5
USC	12
Cal	10 (OT)
Third place
December 5
Loyola Marymount
St. Francis (NY)

2010 NCAA All-Tournament Teams:

- First-Team – Peter Kurzeka, USC (MVP); Ivan Rackov, CAL; Zachary White, CAL; Tibor Forai, LMU; Nikola Vavic, USC; Andy Stevens, LMU; Brian Dudley, CAL
- Second-Team – Boris Plavsic, SFC; Ikaika Aki, LMU; Marko Gencic, SFC; Jeremy Davie, USC; Joel Dennerley, USC; Matt Burton, USC; Cory Nasoff, CAL

=== 2011 ===
Conferences receiving automatic qualification included the Collegiate Water Polo Association, the Mountain Pacific Sports Federation and the Western Water Polo Association. The remaining team was selected at-large without geographical restrictions.

Semifinals (December 3, 2011, Spieker Aquatics Complex, University of California, Berkeley, California)

- USC (22–3) def. Princeton (21–9) 17–4
- UCLA (23–4) def. UC-San Diego (17–9) 10–1

Championship (December 4, 2010, Spieker Aquatics Complex, University of California, Berkeley, California)

- Third-place game, Princeton def. UC San Diego 9–7
- Championship game, USC def. UCLA 7–4

Semi-finals
December 3
USC	17
Princeton	4
December 3
UCLA	10
UC-San Diego	1

Final
December 4
USC	7
UCLA	4
Third place
December 4
Princeton	9
UC-San Diego	7

2011 NCAA All-Tournament Teams:

- First-Team – Joel Dennerley (MOP), Peter Kurzeka and Nikola Vavic, USC; Josh Samuels and Cullen Hennessy, UCLA; Thomas Nelson, Princeton and Graham Saber, UC San Diego.
- Second-team – Matt Rapacz, Griffin White and Cristiano Mirarchi, UCLA; Jeremy Davie and Mace Rapsey, USC; Drew Hoffenberg, Princeton, and Brian Donohoe, UC San Diego.

=== 2012 ===
The NCAA men's water polo championship was held December 1 and 2, 2012 at Southern California's McDonald's Swim Stadium. Conferences receiving automatic qualification included the Collegiate Water Polo Association, the Mountain Pacific Sports Federation and the Western Water Polo Association. The remaining team was selected at-large without geographical restrictions. All four championship games will be streamed live on www.NCAA.com.

Semifinals - December 1, 2012

- Southern California (27–0) vs. Air Force (19–10) 4 p.m. ET
- UCLA (27–4) vs. St. Francis (N.Y.) (16–8) 6:12 p.m. ET

Finals - December 2, 2012

- Third-place game played at 4 p.m. ET
- The championship game played at 6:12 p.m. ET.

Semi-finals
December 1, 4:00 PM
#1 Southern California	18
#4 Air Force	7
December 1, 6:12 PM
#2 UCLA	17
#3 St. Francis Brooklyn	3

Final
December 2, 6:12 PM
Southern California	11
UCLA	10
Third place
December 2, 4:00 PM
St. Francis Brooklyn	14
Air Force	8

=== 2013 ===
The NCAA men's water polo championship was held December 7 and 8, 2013 at Stanford's Avery Aquatic Center. This season marked the introduction of an expanded format. Six teams were seeded into the tournament, with the bottom four participating in Play-in games to fill the four team bracket. Four conferences received automatic qualification: the Collegiate Water Polo Association (CWPA), the Mountain Pacific Sports Federation (MPSF), Southern California Intercollegiate Athletic Conference (SCIAC), and the Western Water Polo Association (WWPA). The remaining two teams were selected at-large without geographical restrictions. The tournament was seeded by the Men's Water Polo Committee on December 1. Conference representatives were Southern Cal (MPSF), Whittier College (SCIAC), UC San Diego (WWPA), and St. Francis College Brooklyn (CWPA).

Play-in – December 5, 2013

- Game 1: #5 St. Francis College Brooklyn (22–10) def. #4 UC San Diego (14–13) 6–5
- Game 2: #3 Stanford (21–5) def. #6 Whittier College (19–12) 20–3

Semifinals – December 7, 2013

- 1 p.m. – Seed No.1 Southern Cal (26–4) def. #5 St. Francis College Brooklyn (23–10) 10–3
- 2:45 p.m. – Seed No. 2 Pacific (22–4) def. #3 Stanford (22–5) 11–10

Finals – December 8, 2013

- Third-place game played at 1 p.m.
- The championship game played at 3 p.m.

Semi-finals
December 7, 1:00 PM
#1 Southern California	10
#4 St. Francis Brooklyn	3
December 7, 2:45 PM
#2 Pacific	11
#3 Stanford	10

Final
December 8, 3:00 PM
Southern California	12
Pacific	11(2 OT)
Third place
December 8, 1:00 PM
St. Francis Brooklyn	2
Stanford	17

=== 2014 ===
The NCAA men's water polo championship was held December 6 and 7, 2014 at UC San Diego's Canyonview Aquatic Center, La Jolla, CA. The tournament continued with the new format by adding two more teams to play in the four-team play-in games. Conferences received automatic qualification were the Collegiate Water Polo Association (CWPA), the Mountain Pacific Sports Federation (MPSF), Southern California Intercollegiate Athletic Conference (SCIAC), and the Western Water Polo Association (WWPA). The remaining teams were selected at-large without geographical restrictions. They were selected by the Men's Water Polo Committee on November 23, 2014.

Play-in – November 29, 2014

- Game 1: #4 UC San Diego (15–9) def. #5 Brown University (26–6) 12–7
- Game 2: #3 USC (22–6) def. #6 Whittier (23–12) 19–4

Semifinals – December 6, 2014

- Game 3, 1:00 PM PT: #1 seed UCLA (27–3) def. #4 seed UC San Diego (16–9) 15–6
- Game 4, 3:12 PM PT: #3 seed USC (23–6) def. #2 seed Stanford (25–3) 12–11 in triple OT

Championship Dec. 7, 2014

- Third-place game, 1:00 p.m. PT: #2 seed Stanford def. #4 seed UC San Diego 20–11
- National Championship Game, 3:12 p.m. PT: #1 seed UCLA def. #3 seed USC 9–8

=== 2015 ===
The NCAA men's water polo championship was held December 5 and 6, 2015 at UCLA's Spieker Aquatics Center, Los Angeles. The tournament continued with the new format by adding two more teams to play in the four-team play-in games. Conferences received automatic qualification were the Collegiate Water Polo Association (CWPA), the Mountain Pacific Sports Federation (MPSF), Southern California Intercollegiate Athletic Conference (SCIAC), and the Western Water Polo Association (WWPA). The remaining teams were selected at-large without geographical restrictions. They were selected by the Men's Water Polo Committee on November 22, 2015.

Play-in – December 2, 2015

- Game 1: #5 UCSD (14–13) def. #4 Princeton (22–4) 12–7
- Game 2: #3 USC (20–6) def. #6 Claremont McKenna-Harvey Mudd-Scripps Colleges (21–7) 20–5

Semifinals – December 5, 2015

- Game 3, 1:00 PM PT: #1 seed UCLA (28–0) def. #5 UCSD (15–13) 17–4
- Game 4, 3:12 PM PT: #3 USC (21–6) def. #2 seed California (23–6) 9–6

Championship Dec. 6, 2015

- Third-place game, 1:00 p.m. PT: Cal def. UCSD 20–9
- National Championship Game, 3:12 p.m. PT: UCLA def. USC 10–7

=== 2016 ===
California defeated USC 11-8 (2OT) for the national championship.

=== 2017 ===
The NCAA men's water polo championship was held December 2 and 3, 2017 at USC, Los Angeles. The tournament continued with the new format with eight teams playing for the championship. Conferences received automatic qualification are the Collegiate Water Polo Association (CWPA), Golden Coast Conference (GCC), the Mountain Pacific Sports Federation (MPSF), Northeast Water Polo Conference (NWPC), Southern California Intercollegiate Athletic Conference (SCIAC), and the Western Water Polo Association (WWPA). The remaining two teams were selected at-large without geographical restrictions.

Opening round – November 25, 2017

- Pacific defeated Pomona-Pitzer 16–2
- Harvard defeated George Washington 15–13

First round – November 30, 2017

- Pacific defeated UC Davis 13–12
- USC defeated Harvard 16–4

Semifinals – December 2, 2017

- UCLA defeated Pacific 11–9
- USC defeated California 12–11

Championship – December 3, 2017

- UCLA defeated USC 7–5

=== 2018 ===
The NCAA men's water polo championship was held December 1 and 2, 2018 at Avery Aquatic Center, Stanford, California. The tournament continued with the format in which eight teams competed for the championship. Teams qualifying as champions of their conferences were Long Beach State, from the Golden Coast Conference (GCC); George Washington, from the Mid-Atlantic Water Polo Conference (MAWPC); Stanford, from the Mountain Pacific Sports Federation (MPSF); Princeton, from the Northeast Water Polo Conference (NWPC); Pomona-Pitzer, from the Southern California Intercollegiate Athletic Conference (SCIAC); and UC San Diego, from the Western Water Polo Association (WWPA). The remaining two teams, Southern California (MPSF) and UCLA (MPSF), were selected at-large without geographical restrictions. Stanford, the #1 seed, and Southern California, the #2 seed, were seeded into the semifinal round, with the other six teams competing for the final two spots in opening and first-round games.

Opening round – November 24, 2018

- Long Beach St. def. Pomona-Pitzer 12–5 at Long Beach State
- George Washington def. Princeton 14–13 at Princeton

First round – November 29, 2018 (at Avery Aquatic Center, Stanford, California)

- UC San Diego def. Long Beach St. 14–9
- UCLA def. George Washington 18–6

Semifinals – December 1, 2018

- Stanford def. UC San Diego 16–7 (3:00 PM PT)
- USC def. UCLA 8–7 (5:00 PM PT)

Championship – December 2, 2018

- USC def. Stanford 14–12

=== 2019 ===
The NCAA men's water polo championship was held December 7 and 8, 2019 at the Chris Kjeldsen Aquatic Center, Stockton, California. Seven teams played for the championship. Teams qualifying as champions of their conferences were Pepperdine, from the Golden Coast Conference (GCC); Bucknell, from the Mid-Atlantic Water Polo Conference (MAWPC); Stanford, from the Mountain Pacific Sports Federation (MPSF); Harvard, from the Northeast Water Polo Conference (NWPC); and UC Davis, from the Western Water Polo Association (WWPA). The remaining two teams, Southern California (MPSF) and Pacific (GCC), were selected at-large without geographical restrictions. Stanford, the #1 seed, and Pacific, the #2 seed, were seeded into the semifinal round, with the other five teams competing for the final two spots. This was the first year since 1997 that Pepperdine made the playoffs, ending a 22-year drought.

Opening round – November 30, 2019

- Bucknell 13, Harvard 12

Opening round – Thursday, Dec. 5, 2019

- Southern California 15, Bucknell 9
- Pepperdine 15, UC Davis 12

Semifinals – Saturday, Dec. 7, 2019

- Stanford 15, Southern California 14 (3OT)
- Pacific 17, Pepperdine 13

Championship – Sunday, Dec. 8, 2019

- Stanford 13, Pacific 8

=== 2020 ===
The tournament was played at the Uytengsu Aquatics Center, on the campus of USC in Los Angeles. UCLA's Nicolas Saveljic was chosen as the most valuable player after the Bruins defeated the Trojans for their 12th title.

Opening round – Thursday, March 18, 2021

- UCLA 19, California Baptist 14
- USC 18, Bucknell 9

Semifinals – Saturday, March 20, 2021

- No. 3 UCLA 11, No. 1 Stanford 10
- No. 4 USC 12, No. 2 California 10

Championship – Sunday, March 21, 2021

- No. 3 UCLA 7, No. 4 USC 6

=== 2021 ===
The tournament was held at the Spieker Aquatics Center, on the campus of UCLA in Los Angeles. California defeated Southern California 13–12 to win the 2021 NCAA water polo national championship. It was California's 15th title. Nikos Papanikolaou was the MVP of the tournament.

=== 2022 ===
The national championship was held on December 3–4, 2022 at the Spieker Aquatics Complex on the campus of the University of California, Berkeley, California. Cal defeated Southern California for the 2022 title 13–12.

First Round

- Nov. 26, Noon: Princeton (27–5) 11 def. Fordham (26–8) 10

Quarterfinals

- Game 1, Dec. 1, 3:00 PM PST: Pacific (22–6) 11 def. UC Davis (19–8) 7
- Game 2, Dec. 1, 5:00 PM PST: Southern California (19–6) 11 def. Princeton (26–6) 8

Semifinals

- Game 3, Dec. 3, 2:00 PM PST: Cal (22–2) 16 def. Pacific (22–7) 9
- Game 4, Dec. 3, 4:00 PM PST: Southern California (20–6) 15 def. UCLA (22–4) 12

Final

- Cal (23–2) 13 def. Southern California (21–6) 12

=== 2023 ===
The national championship was held on December 1–3, 2023 at Uytengsu Aquatics Center on the campus of the University of Southern California, Los Angeles, California. Seven conferences were granted automatic bids. The Southern California Athletic Conference (SCIAC) declined an automatic invitation this year. The tournament was reduced to eight teams. This was the first year since 1993 that UC Irvine made the playoffs, breaking a 30-year drought.

- First round: Friday, Dec. 1, 12:00 p.m., 2:00 p.m., 4:00 p.m., 6:00 p.m.
- Second round: Saturday, Dec. 2, 2:00 p.m., 4:00 p.m.
- Championship: Sunday, Dec. 3, 3:00 p.m. PST, ESPNU

Quarter-finals
December 1, 2023
(1) UCLA	20
Biola	7
(4) Princeton	12
UC Irvine	7
(2) California	16
Fordham	6
(3) Southern California	18
San José State	10

Semi-finals
December 2, 2023
(1) UCLA	17
(4) Princeton	13
December 2, 2023
(2) California	10
(3) Southern California	9

Final
December 3, 2023
(1) UCLA	11
(2) California	13

=== 2024 ===
The national championship were held on December 6–8, 2024 at Avery Aquatic Center, Stanford, California with eight teams participating. Six conferences received automatic selections: Mountain Pacific Sports Federation, West Coast Conference, Northeast Water Polo Conference, Collegiate Water Polo Association, Big West Conference, and Western Water Polo Association.

- First round: Friday, Dec. 6, 12:00 p.m., 2:00 p.m., 4:00 p.m., 6:00 p.m. (PST)
- Second round: Saturday, Dec. 7, 2:00 p.m., 4:00 p.m. (PST)
- Championship: Sunday, Dec. 8, 3:00 p.m. (PST), ESPNU

Quarter-finals
December 6, 2024
(1) UCLA (23-2)	22
Salem (WV) (20-3)	6
(4) Stanford (21-4)	15
Princeton (23-8)	8
(2) Southern California (21-5)	17
California Baptist (23-13)	13
(3) Fordham (30-0)	16
Long Beach St. (20-10)	11

Semi-finals
December 7, 2024
(1) UCLA	17
(4) Stanford	14
December 7, 2024
(2) Southern California	18
(3) Fordham	16 (2OT)

Final
December 8, 2024
(1) UCLA	11
(2) Southern California	8

- Ryder Dodd (UCLA) was named player-of-the match.

=== 2025 ===
The national championship will be held on December 5–7, 2025 at Avery Aquatic Center, Stanford, California with eight teams participating. Six conferences received automatic selections: Mountain Pacific Sports Federation, West Coast Conference, Northeast Water Polo Conference, Big West Conference, Mid-Atlantic Water Polo Conference, and Western Water Polo Association.

- First round: Friday, Dec. 5, 12:00 p.m., 2:00 p.m., 4:00 p.m., 6:00 p.m., (PST) NCAA.com
- Second round: Saturday, Dec. 6, 2:00 p.m., 4:00 p.m. (PST) NCAA.com
- Championship: Sunday, Dec. 7, 3:00 p.m. (PST), ESPNU

Quarter-finals
December 5, 2025
(1) Southern California (21–3)	16
Concordia University Irvine (22–12)	6
(4) Fordham (25-3)	13
San Jose St. (14-7)	9
(2) UCLA (24-2)	15
Princeton (23-9)	11
(3) Stanford (17-7)	15
UC Davis (14-12)	9

Semi-finals
December 6, 2025
(1) Southern California	16
(4) Fordham	7
December 6, 2025
(2) UCLA	9
(3) Stanford	7

Final
December 7, 2025
(1) Southern California	10
(2) UCLA	11

==== All Tournament Team ====
- Frederico Jucá Carsalade, UCLA (Most outstanding player)

== See also ==
- Collegiate Water Polo Association
- Western Water Polo Association
- Mountain Pacific Sports Federation
- Southern California Intercollegiate Athletic Conference
- Golden Coast Conference
