= 2021 NCAA Men's Water Polo Championship =

2021 NCAA Men's Water Polo tournament
- Teams: 7
- Format: Single-elimination
- Finals site: Spieker Aquatics Center; Los Angeles, California
- Champions: California Golden Bears (15th title, 24th title game, 30th Final Four)
- Runner-up: USC Trojans (26th title game, 31st Final Four)
- Semifinalists: UCLA Bruins (33rd Final Four); UC Davis Aggies (1st Final Four)
- Winning coach: Kirk Everist (4th title)
- MVP: Nikos Papanikolaou (California)
- Television: NCAA

The 2021 NCAA Men's Water Polo Championship occurred from December 4–5, 2021 in Los Angeles, California at the Spieker Aquatics Center. This was the 53rd NCAA Men's Water Polo Championship. Seven teams participated in this championship. Opening round game-one was played at Princeton University. The UCLA Bruins were the defending national champions and the 2021 Mountain Pacific Sports Federation (MPSF) champions. The rankings before the tournament: No. 1 University of California, No. 2 University of Southern California, No. 3 University of California Los Angeles, No. 4 Stanford University, No. 5 Long Beach State University.

== Schedule ==
All times are Eastern time

November 27	December 2	December 4	December 5
Opening Round Game 1	Opening Round Games 2 & 3	Semifinals	Championship
1:00 p.m.	3:00 p.m. & 6:00 p.m.	5:00 p.m. & 7:00 p.m.	5:00 p.m.

== Bracket ==
The championship featured a knockout format where schools that lost were eliminated from the tournament. The championship pairings were announced on Sunday, November 21, 2021 by the NCAA Men’s Water Polo Committee.

Opening Round Game 1
Fordham	8
Princeton	17

Opening Round Games 2–3
UCLA	12
Princeton	6
UC Davis (OT)	9
Long Beach State	8

Semifinals
California (OT)	15
UCLA	13
USC	11
UC Davis	8

Final
California	13
USC	12

== Qualification ==
Top ranked teams from five conferences received automatic qualification (AQ). The conferences are the Golden Coast Conference (GCC), Mid-Atlantic Water Polo Conference (MAWPC), Mountain Pacific Sports Federation (MPSF), Northeast Water Polo Conference (NWPC), and the Western Water Polo Association (WWPA). The two at-large teams, without geographical restrictions, came from MPSF: UCLA and Southern California.

=== Teams ===
Conference	Team	Record
GCC	Long Beach State	22–5
MAWPC	Fordham	24–6
MPSF	California	20–4
MPSF	UCLA	19–3
MPSF	USC	17–2
NWPC	Princeton	25–7
WWPA	UC Davis	17–2

== All-NCAA Tournament Team ==
After the championship, the All-NCAA Tournament First and Second teams were announced.

=== First Team ===
- Max Casabella (Cal)
- Hannes Daube (USC)
- Jack Deely (Cal)
- Jacob Mercep (USC)
- Ashworth Molthen (USC)
- Nikolaos Papanikolaou (MVP, Cal)
- Adrian Weinberg (Cal)

=== Second Team ===
- Nic Porter (USC)
- Nikos Delagrammatikas (Cal)
- Nir Gross (UC Davis)
- Aleix Aznar Beltran (UC Davis)

== Awards ==
- Gabe Discipulo (UCLA) was awarded the Elite 90 Award (highest GPA).
