= 1990 NCAA Men's Water Polo Championship =

Water polo tournament season

Tournament details
- Dates: December 1990
- Teams: 8

Final positions
- Champions: California (9th title)
- Runners-up: Stanford (9th title game)

Tournament statistics
- Matches played: 12
- Goals scored: 239 (19.92 per match)
- Attendance: 3,185 (265 per match)
- Top goal scorer(s): Lucas Nicolao, Navy. (10)

Awards
- Best player: Chris Humbert (California)

The 1990 NCAA Men's Water Polo Championship was the 22nd annual NCAA Men's Water Polo Championship to determine the national champion of NCAA men's collegiate water polo. Tournament matches were played at the Belmont Plaza Pool in Long Beach, California during December 1990.

California defeated Stanford in the final, 8–7, to win their ninth national title. Coached by Steve Heaston, the Golden Bears finished the season 29–1.

As of 2025, UC Santa Barbara has not returned to the Water Polo playoffs. They currently have a 35-year drought, the longest of any such team that has won a National Championship.

The Most Outstanding Player of the tournament was Chris Humbert (California). Humbert, along with six other players, was named to the All-Tournament Team.

The tournament's leading scorer, with 10 goals, was Lucas Nicolao from Navy.

== Qualification ==
Since there has only ever been one single national championship for water polo, all NCAA men's water polo programs (whether from Division I, Division II, or Division III) were eligible. A total of 8 teams were invited to contest this championship.

Team	Appearance	Previous
Air Force	6th	1986
Brown	11th	1989
California	17th	1989
UC Santa Barbara	12th	1985
Navy	5th	1988
Pepperdine	8th	1989
Stanford	18th	1989
UCLA	18th	1988

== Bracket ==
- Site: Belmont Plaza Pool, Long Beach, California

Fifth place
Pepperdine	16
Air Force	13
Seventh place
Brown	6
Navy	7

Consolation semifinals
Brown	6
Pepperdine	13
Navy	8
Air Force	11

First round
California	16
Brown	6
UCLA	10
Pepperdine	9
UC Santa Barbara	16
Navy	9
Stanford	14
Air Force	6

Championship semifinals
California	10
UCLA	8
UC Santa Barbara	8
Stanford	9

Championship
California	8
Stanford	7
Third place
UCLA	15
UC Santa Barbara	8

== All-tournament team ==
- Chris Humbert, California (Most outstanding player)
- Julian Bailey, California
- (Australia) Geoffrey Clark, Pepperdine
- Dan Hackett, UCLA
- Colin Keely, Stanford
- Rick McNair, Stanford
- Stefan Pollmann, UCLA

== See also ==
- NCAA Men's Water Polo Championship
