= 1996 NCAA Men's Water Polo Championship =

Water polo tournament season

Tournament details
- Dates: December 1996
- Teams: 4

Final positions
- Champions: UCLA (5th title)
- Runners-up: USC (5th title game)

Tournament statistics
- Matches played: 4
- Goals scored: 84 (21 per match)
- Attendance: 2,790 (698 per match)
- Top goal scorer(s): Hrvoje Cismic, USC (5); Brian Stahl, UMass (5); Marko Zagar, USC (5)

Awards
- Best player: Matt Swanson, UCLA

The 1996 NCAA Men's Water Polo Championship was the 28th annual NCAA Men's Water Polo Championship to determine the national champion of NCAA men's collegiate water polo. Tournament matches were played at Canyonview Pool in La Jolla, San Diego, California during December 1996.

UCLA defeated USC in the final, 8–7, to win their fifth national title. The Bruins (24–6) were coached by Guy Baker.

The Most Outstanding Player of the tournament was Matt Swanson from UCLA. Swanson, along with seven other players, comprised the All-Tournament Team.

The tournament's leading scorers, with 5 goals each, were Hrvoje Cismic (USC), Brian Stahl (Massachusetts), and Marko Zagar (USC).

== Qualification ==
Since there has only ever been one single national championship for water polo, all NCAA men's water polo programs (whether from Division I, Division II, or Division III) were eligible. A total of 4 teams were invited to contest this championship.

Team	Appearance	Previous
UC Davis	3rd	1975
Massachusetts	4th	1995
USC	15th	1994
UCLA	22nd	1995

== Bracket ==
- Site: Canyonview Pool, La Jolla, San Diego, California

Semifinals
USC	21
Massachusetts	6
UCLA	18
UC Davis	6

Championship
USC	7
UCLA	8
Third Place
Massachusetts	8
UC Davis	11

== All-tournament team ==
- Jeremy Braxton-Brown, UCLA
- Simun Cimerman, USC
- Hrvoje Cizmic, USC
- Corbin Graham, UCLA
- Brian Stahl, Massachusetts
- Matt Swanson, UCLA (Most outstanding player)
- Jim Toring, UCLA
- Marko Zagar, USC

== See also ==
- NCAA Men's Water Polo Championship
