= 2019 NCAA Men's Water Polo Championship =

Collegiate water polo championship

2019 NCAA Men's Water Polo tournament
- Teams: 7
- Format: Single-elimination
- Finals site: Chris Kjeldsen Pool Complex; Stockton, California
- Champions: Stanford (11th title)
- Runner-up: Pacific
- Semifinalists: Southern California; Pepperdine
- Winning coach: John Vargas (1st title)
- MVP: Ben Hallock (Stanford)
- Television: NCAA

The 2019 NCAA Men's Water Polo Championship occurred from November 30 to December 8, 2019. The first game of the opening round was held at Blodgett Pool in Cambridge, Massachusetts and hosted by Harvard University. All subsequent games, including the finals, were held at Chris Kjeldsen Pool Complex in Stockton, California and hosted by the University of the Pacific. This was the 51st NCAA Men's Water Polo Championship. Seven teams participated in this championship. Opening round game one was played at Harvard University. The Southern California Trojans (USC) were the defending national champions.

== Qualifying teams ==
Five conferences were granted automatic qualification to the championship: Golden Coast Conference (GCC), Mid-Atlantic Water Polo Conference (MAWPC), Mountain Pacific Sports Federation (MPSF), Northeast Water Polo Conference (NWPC), and the Western Water Polo Association (WWPA). Two additional teams earned entry into the tournament with at-large bids, with one of them coming from the Mountain Pacific Sports Federation and one coming from the Golden Coast Conference.

Seed	Team	Conference	Bid type	Appearance
1	Stanford	MPSF	Automatic	33rd
2	Pacific	GCC	At-large	4th
	Bucknell	MAWPC	Automatic	7th
	Harvard	NWPC	Automatic	3rd
	Pepperdine	GCC	Automatic	13th
	Southern California	MPSF	At-large	34th
	UC Davis	WWPA	Automatic	7th

== Schedule ==
All times are Eastern time

November 30	December 5	December 7	December 8
Opening Round Game 1	Opening Round Games 2 & 3	Semifinals	Championship
12:30 p.m.	4:00 p.m. & 5:45 p.m.	8:00 p.m. & 10:00 p.m.	6:00 p.m.

== Bracket ==
The championship featured a knockout format where schools that lost were eliminated from the tournament. The championship pairings were announced on Tuesday, November 26, 2019, by the NCAA Men’s Water Polo Committee.

Opening Round Game 1
Harvard	12
Bucknell	13

Opening Round Games 2–3
Bucknell	9
Southern California	15
UC Davis	12
Pepperdine	15

Semifinals
1	Stanford	15 (OT)
Southern California	14
2	Pacific	17
Pepperdine	13

Final
1	Stanford	13
2	Pacific	8

== All Tournament Team ==
After the championship, the All-NCAA Tournament First and Second teams were announced.

=== First Team ===
- Tyler Abramson (Stanford)
- Engin Ege Colak (Pacific)
- Chris Dilworth (Pepperdine)
- Ben Hallock (Most Outstanding Player, Stanford)
- Jacob Mercep (Southern California)
- Luke Pavillard (Pacific)
- Nic Porter (Southern California)

=== Second Team ===
- Andrew Chun (Stanford)
- Jeremie Cote (Pacific)
- Balazs Kosa (Pepperdine)
- AJ Rossman (Stanford)
- Djordje Stanic (Pacific)
- Bennett Williams (Stanford)
- Quinn Woodhead (Stanford)
