= 2025 NCAA Men's Water Polo Championship =

Collegiate water polo championship

2025 NCAA Men's Water Polo tournament
- Teams: 8
- Format: Single-elimination
- Finals site: Avery Aquatic Center; Stanford, California
- Champions: UCLA (14th title)
- Runner-up: Southern California
- Semifinalists: Stanford; Fordham
- Winning coach: Adam Wright (6th title)
- MVP: Frederico Jucá Carsalade (UCLA)
- Television: NCAA and ESPNU

The 2025 NCAA Men's Water Polo Championship occurred from December 5–7, 2025, in Stanford, California at the Avery Aquatic Center and hosted by Stanford University. This was the 57th NCAA Men's Water Polo Championship. The UCLA Bruins were the defending national champions.

== Qualifying teams ==
Six conferences were granted automatic qualification to the championship: Big West Conference (Big West), Mid-Atlantic Water Polo Conference (MAWPC), Mountain Pacific Sports Federation (MPSF), Northeast Water Polo Conference (NWPC), West Coast Conference (WCC), and the Western Water Polo Association (WWPA). Two additional teams earned entry into the tournament with at-large bids, with both of them coming from the Mountain Pacific Sports Federation.

Seed	Team	Conference	Bid type	Appearance
1	Southern California	MPSF	Automatic	40th
2	UCLA	MPSF	At-large	40th
3	Stanford	MPSF	At-large	36th
4	Fordham	MAWPC	Automatic	5th
	Concordia University-Irvine (CUI)	WWPA	Automatic	1st
	Princeton	NWPC	Automatic	11th
	San Jose State	WCC	Automatic	6th
	UC Davis	Big West	Automatic	10th

== Schedule ==
All times are Eastern time

December 5	December 5	December 6	December 7
First Round Games 1 & 2	First Round Games 3 & 4	Semifinals	Championship
3:00 p.m. & 5:00 p.m.	7:00 p.m. & 9:00 p.m.	5:00 p.m. & 7:00 p.m.	6:00 p.m.

== Bracket ==
The championship featured a knockout format where schools that lost were eliminated from the tournament. The championship pairings were announced on Monday, November 24, 2025, by the NCAA Men’s Water Polo Committee.

First round Friday, December 5, 2025
1	Southern California	16
CUI	6
4	Fordham	13
San Jose State	9
2	UCLA	15
Princeton	11
3	Stanford	15
UC Davis	9

Semifinals; Saturday, December 6, 2025
1	Southern California	16
4	Fordham	7
2	UCLA	9
3	Stanford	7

Championship; Sunday, December 7, 2025
1	Southern California	10
2	UCLA	11

== All Tournament Team ==
After the championship, the All-NCAA Tournament First and Second teams were announced.

=== First Team ===
- West Temkin (Goalkeeper) – (Stanford)
- Ben Forer (Stanford)
- Frederico Jucá Carsalade (Most Outstanding Player, UCLA)
- Chase Dodd (UCLA)
- Ryder Dodd (UCLA)
- Robert López Duart (Southern California)
- Straninja Krstic (Southern California)

=== Second Team ===
- Pablo De Souza (Goalkeeper) – (Concordia University-Irvine)
- Andras Toth (Fordham)
- Logan McCarroll (Princeton)
- Mateja Bosic (San Jose State)
- Botond Balogh (Stanford)
- Tommy Kiesling (UC Davis)
- Mihailo Vukazic (Southern California)
