= 1991 NCAA Men's Water Polo Championship =

Water polo tournament season

Tournament details
- Dates: December 1991
- Teams: 8

Final positions
- Champions: California (10th title)
- Runners-up: UCLA (8th title game)

Tournament statistics
- Matches played: 12
- Goals scored: 235 (19.58 per match)
- Attendance: 3,502 (292 per match)
- Top goal scorer(s): Steve Gill, UC Irvine (11)

Awards
- Best player: Chris Humbert (California)

The 1991 NCAA Men's Water Polo Championship was the 23rd annual NCAA Men's Water Polo Championship to determine the national champion of NCAA men's collegiate water polo. Tournament matches were played at the Belmont Plaza Pool in Long Beach, California during December 1991.

California defeated UCLA in the final, 7–6, to win their tenth, and second consecutive, national title. Coached by Steve Heaston, the Golden Bears finished the season 26–1.

The Most Outstanding Player of the tournament was, for the second straight year, Chris Humbert from California. Humbert, along with six other players, was named to the All-Tournament Team.

The tournament's leading scorer, with 11 goals, was Steve Gill from UC Irvine.

== Qualification ==
Since there has only ever been one single national championship for water polo, all NCAA men's water polo programs (whether from Division I, Division II, or Division III) were eligible. A total of 8 teams were invited to contest this championship. This was the first time that two non-Division I programs (Slippery Rock and UC San Diego) qualified for the same tournament.

Team	Appearance	Previous
California	18th	1990
UC Irvine	19th	1989
UC San Diego	2nd	1989
Long Beach State	12th	1989
Navy	6th	1990
Pepperdine	9th	1990
Slippery Rock	2nd	1983
UCLA	19th	1990

== Bracket ==
- Site: Belmont Plaza Pool, Long Beach, California

Fifth place
Long Beach State	12
UC San Diego	10
Seventh place
Navy	8
Slippery Rock	9

Consolation semifinals
Navy	9
Long Beach State	13
UC San Diego	12
Slippery Rock	10

First round
California	13
Navy	6
UC Irvine	11
Long Beach State	8
UCLA	14
UC San Diego	10
Pepperdine	18
Slippery Rock	9

Championship semifinals
California	13
UC Irvine	10
UCLA	6
Pepperdine	5

Championship
California	7
UCLA	6
Third place
UC Irvine	7
Pepperdine	9

== All-tournament team ==
- Chris Humbert, California (Most outstanding player)
- Jason Brown, UC San Diego
- Mike Burke, Long Beach State
- (Australia) Geoffrey Clark, Pepperdine
- Steve Gill, UC Irvine
- Dan Hackett, UCLA
- Oliver Will, UCLA

== See also ==
- NCAA Men's Water Polo Championship
