= 1989 NCAA Men's Water Polo Championship =

Water polo tournament season

Tournament details
- Dates: December 1989
- Teams: 8

Final positions
- Champions: UC Irvine (3rd title)
- Runners-up: California (13th title game)

Tournament statistics
- Matches played: 12
- Goals scored: 193 (16.08 per match)
- Attendance: 3,421 (285 per match)
- Top goal scorer(s): Tom Warde, UC Irvine (11)

Awards
- Best player: Dan Smoot (UC Irvine)

The 1989 NCAA Men's Water Polo Championship was the 21st annual NCAA Men's Water Polo Championship to determine the national champion of NCAA men's collegiate water polo. Tournament matches were played at the Indiana University Natatorium in Indianapolis, Indiana during December 1989.

UC Irvine defeated two-time defending champion California in the final, 9–8, to win their third national title. Coached by Ted Newland, the Anteaters finished the season 27–6.

The Most Outstanding Player of the tournament was Dan Smoot (UC Irvine). Smoot, along with eight other players, was named to the All-Tournament Team.

The tournament's leading scorer, with 11 goals, was Tom Warde from UC Irvine.

== Qualification ==
Since there has only ever been one single national championship for water polo, all NCAA men's water polo programs (whether from Division I, Division II, or Division III) were eligible. A total of 8 teams were invited to contest this championship.

Team	Appearance	Previous
Arkansas–Little Rock	2nd	1988
Brown	10th	1987
California	16th	1988
UC Irvine	18th	1988
UC San Diego	1st	Never
Long Beach State	10th	1988
Pepperdine	7th	1987
Stanford	17th	1988

== Bracket ==
- Site: Indiana University Natatorium, Indianapolis, Indiana

Fifth place
Long Beach State	10
UC San Diego	5
Seventh place
Brown	8
Arkansas–Little Rock	6

Consolation semifinals
Brown	4
Long Beach State	8
UC San Diego	10
Arkansas–Little Rock	9

First round
California	15
Brown	2
Pepperdine	13
Long Beach State	8
Stanford	7
UC San Diego	6
UC Irvine	13
Arkansas–Little Rock	6

Championship semifinals
California	10
Pepperdine	9
Stanford	7
UC Irvine	8

Championship
California	8
UC Irvine	9
Third place
Pepperdine	5
Stanford	7

== All-tournament team ==
- Dan Smoot, UC Irvine (Most outstanding player)
- Rich Ambidge, California
- (Australia) Geoffrey Clark, Pepperdine
- Chris Duplanty, UC Irvine
- Chris Humbert, California
- Rick McNair, Stanford
- Jeff Oeding, Stanford
- Sasa Poljak, Pepperdine
- Tom Warde, UC Irvine

== See also ==
- NCAA Men's Water Polo Championship
