= Kinney Natatorium =

Coordinates: 40.9570°N 76.8873°W

- Interactive map of Kinney Natatorium
- Address: Lewisburg, Pennsylvania
- Owner: Bucknell University
- Capacity: 500 spectators

Construction
- Opened: October 2002; 23 years ago

Tenant
- Bucknell Bison swimming & diving 2002–present

Website
- Official website

Kinney Natatorium is a multi-purpose natatorium located in Lewisburg, Pennsylvania. The venue hosts home meets for the Bucknell Bison men's and women's swimming and diving teams and water polo teams. Kinney Natatorium was opened in 2002 and also host the PIAA swimming and diving championships annually.
