= Southern California Athletic Conference =

Junior college athletic conference in Southern California

The Southern California Athletic Conference (SCAC) was a junior college athletic conference with member schools located in Southern California that was founded in 1986. Charter members included Antelope Valley College, Cerro Coso Community College, Chaffey College, Los Angeles City College (LACC), Los Angeles Trade–Technical College (LATTC), Los Angeles Valley College (LAVC), San Bernardino Valley College, and Victor Valley College.

== Yearly football standings ==
1986 Southern California Athletic Conference football standings
	Conf.					Overall
Team	W		L		T	W		L		T
Desert +	6	–	1	–	0	9	–	2	–	0
Los Angeles Valley +	6	–	1	–	0	6	–	3	–	0
Harbor	4	–	3	–	0	5	–	4	–	0
Mt. San Jacinto	4	–	3	–	0	4	–	5	–	0
Antelope Valley	3	–	4	–	0	5	–	5	–	0
San Bernardino Valley	2	–	5	–	0	3	–	7	–	0
Rio Hondo	2	–	5	–	0	2	–	8	–	0
Chaffey *	1	–	6	–	0	2	–	8	–	0
+ – Conference co-champions; * — Chaffey forfeited a conference game to San Bernardino Valley and a non-conference game to Victor Valley.

1987 Southern California Athletic Conference football standings
	Conf.					Overall
Team	W		L		T	W		L		T
Antelope Valley $	8	–	1	–	0	8	–	3	–	0
Desert	7	–	2	–	0	2	–	8	–	0
Los Angeles Valley	7	–	2	–	0	8	–	2	–	0
Chaffey	5	–	4	–	0	5	–	5	–	0
Rio Hondo	5	–	4	–	0	5	–	5	–	0
San Bernardino Valley	5	–	4	–	0	5	–	5	–	0
Mt. San Jacinto	3	–	5	–	1	4	–	5	–	1
Harbor	2	–	6	–	1	2	–	7	–	1
Los Angeles Southwest	2	–	7	–	0	3	–	7	–	0
Victor Valley	0	–	9	–	0	0	–	10	–	0
$ – Conference champion
