= 1988 NCAA Men's Water Polo Championship =

Water polo tournament season

Tournament details
- Dates: December 1988
- Teams: 8

Final positions
- Champions: California (8th title)
- Runners-up: UCLA (7th title game)

Tournament statistics
- Matches played: 12
- Goals scored: 238 (19.83 per match)
- Attendance: 5,073 (423 per match)
- Top goal scorer(s): Kyle Kopp, Long Beach State (12)

Awards
- Best player: Kirk Everist (California)

The 1988 NCAA Men's Water Polo Championship was the 20th annual NCAA Men's Water Polo Championship to determine the national champion of NCAA men's collegiate water polo. Tournament matches were played at the Belmont Plaza Pool in Long Beach, California during December 1988.

California defeated UCLA in the final, 14–11, to win their eighth national title. Coached by Pete Cutino, the Golden Bears finished the season 33–3.

The Most Outstanding Player of the tournament was Kirk Everist (California). An All-Tournament Team of seven players was also named.

The tournament's leading scorer, with 12 goals, was Kyle Kopp from Long Beach State.

== Qualification ==
Since there has only ever been one single national championship for water polo, all NCAA men's water polo programs (whether from Division I, Division II, or Division III) were eligible. A total of 8 teams were invited to contest this championship. Arkansas–Little Rock, who appeared for the first time this year, was the first team from the Southern United States to qualify for the tournament.

Team	Appearance	Previous
Arkansas–Little Rock	1st	Never
California	15th	1987
UC Irvine	17th	1987
Long Beach State	9th	1985
Navy	4th	1987
USC	11th	1987
Stanford	16th	1987
UCLA	17th	1987

== Bracket ==
- Site: Belmont Plaza Pool, Long Beach, California

Fifth place
Long Beach State	13
UC Irvine	10
Seventh place
Arkansas–Little Rock (OT)	10
Navy	9

Consolation semifinals
Arkansas–Little Rock	10
Long Beach State	13
UC Irvine	17
Navy	5

First round
California	17
Arkansas–Little Rock	6
Stanford	5
Long Beach State	4
USC	13
UC Irvine	11
UCLA	11
Navy	3

Championship semifinals
California	10
Stanford	6
USC	10
UCLA	13

Championship
California	14
UCLA	11
Third place
Stanford	7
USC	10

== All-tournament team ==
- Kirk Everist, California (Most outstanding player)
- Rich Ambidge, California
- Zoltan Berty, USC
- Jeff Brush, California
- Fernando Carsalade, UCLA
- Rob Carver, USC
- Alexis Rousseau, UCLA

== See also ==
- NCAA Men's Water Polo Championship
