= 2000 NCAA Men's Water Polo Championship =

Water polo tournament season

Tournament details
- Dates: December 2000
- Teams: 4

Final positions
- Champions: UCLA (7th title)
- Runners-up: UC San Diego (1st title game)

Tournament statistics
- Matches played: 4
- Goals scored: 71 (17.75 per match)
- Attendance: 3,049 (762 per match)
- Top goal scorer(s): Ivan Babic, USC (9)

Awards
- Best player: Sean Kern, UCLA

The 2000 NCAA Men's Water Polo Championship was the 32nd annual NCAA Men's Water Polo Championship to determine the national champion of NCAA men's collegiate water polo. Tournament matches were played at Raleigh Runnels Memorial Pool in Malibu, California during December 2000.

UCLA defeated UC San Diego in the final, 11–2, to win their seventh, and second consecutive, national title. The Bruins (19–7) were coached by Guy Baker and Adam Krikorian.

The Most Outstanding Player of the tournament was Sean Kern from UCLA. Kern, along with seven other players, comprised the All-Tournament Team.

Ivan Babic, from USC, was the tournament's leading scorer, with 9 goals.

== Qualification ==
Since there has only ever been one single national championship for water polo, all NCAA men's water polo programs (whether from Division I, Division II, or Division III) were eligible. A total of 4 teams were invited to contest this championship.

Team	Appearance	Previous
UC San Diego	8th	1999
Navy	10th	1994
USC	18th	1998
UCLA	24th	1999

== Bracket ==
- Site: Raleigh Runnels Memorial Pool, Malibu, California

Semifinals
UCLA	12
Navy	5
UC San Diego	9
USC	8

Championship
UCLA	11
UC San Diego	2
Third Place
Navy	9
USC	15

== All-tournament team ==
- Ivan Babic, USC
- Jason Boettner, UC San Diego
- Brandon Brooks, UCLA
- Brian Brown, UCLA
- Padraig Damjanov, USC
- Sean Kern, UCLA (Most outstanding player)
- Stever O'Rourke, USC
- Brian Stahl, Navy
- JC Miro, UCLA

== See also ==
- NCAA Men's Water Polo Championship
- NCAA Women's Water Polo Championship (began May 2001)
