= Jovan Vavic =

American water polo team coach

- Born: 1961 or 1962 (age 64–65); PR Montenegro, FPR Yugoslavia
- Education: UCLA ('92)
- Occupations: Head water polo coach, men’s and women’s teams
- Employer: University of Southern California
- Known for: National Coach of the Year 15 times; Mountain Pacific Sports Federation Coach of the Year 13 times; Pac-12 Coach of the Century; Indicted in 2019 college admissions bribery scandal
- Criminal charge: conspiracy to commit racketeering
- Children: 4

Jovan Vavic (born 1961 or 1962) is the former head coach of both the University of Southern California (USC) men's and women's water polo teams. In 2012, he was interim head coach of the United States men's national water polo team. While coaching USC he won the National Coach of the Year award 15 times, and the Mountain Pacific Sports Federation Coach of the Year award 13 times. He was fired by USC in March 2019 in the wake of his indictment in the 2019 college admissions bribery scandal. After his indictment, Vavic was arrested on charges of accepting at least $250,000 in bribes. In April 2022, he was convicted of fraud and bribery. However, the conviction was later overturned and a new trial ordered. On May 30, 2025, his conviction was reinstated by the Boston-based 1st U.S. Circuit Court of Appeals.

== Early and personal life ==
Vavic was born in Montenegro, which was then part of Yugoslavia. He grew up in Herceg Novi and emigrated to the United States in 1984. Vavic graduated from UCLA with a Bachelor's degree in history in 1992. He and his wife, whom he married in 1990, have four children. He is a resident of Rancho Palos Verdes, California.

== Water polo coaching career ==
From 1987 to 1990, Vavic coached water polo at Palos Verdes High School.

Vavic was the head coach of the U.S. water polo team at the 1995 World University Games in 2003. In 2012, he was interim head coach of the United States men's national water polo team.

He became a coach at University of Southern California (USC) in 1992, and was the head coach of the USC Trojans men's and women's water polo teams. Vavic led both teams to national championships three times in the same school year. He won the National Coach of the Year award 15 times, and the Mountain Pacific Sports Federation Coach of the Year award 13 times. In 2015 he was named Pac-12 Coach of the Century. His teams won 16 national titles, including 1998, 2003, 2005, and 2008 with the USC men's water polo teams. Vavic coached 14 Peter J. Cutino Award winners. Among the Olympians he coached were J. W. Krumpholz, Flora Bolonyai, Anni Espar, Brittany Hayes, McQuin Baron, and Thomas Dunstan.

== Indictment in bribery scandal and trial ==
Vavic was arrested and indicted in March 2019 in the 2019 college admissions bribery scandal. He was accused of signing two "recruits" who had never actually played competitive water polo, to help the students gain admission to USC, in exchange for $250,000 in bribes from the students' parents. In additions to these charges, Vavic was also accused of helping recruit other coaches into the student admissions bribery scheme as well. He was charged with conspiracy to commit racketeering. The charge carries penalties of a prison term of up to 20 years, and up to $250,000 in fines.

Vavic was fired by USC in the immediate wake of his indictment. On March 12, 2019, Vavic was arrested. Vavic's supervisor, senior assistant USC athletic director Donna Heinel, would be fired and arrested the same day as well. Following his arrest, Vavic put his Rancho Palos Verdes home on the market and offered to sell it for $2.499 million.

On March 10, 2022, Vavic's criminal trial officially began in a Boston federal court. On April 8, 2022, a federal jury in Boston convicted Vavic of fraud and bribery. On September 15, 2022, Boston-based U.S. District Judge Indira Talwani overturned Vavic's conviction and ordered for a new trial to take place. Talwani cited the significance of USC accepting payment from the students’ families as a reason for overturning the conviction, and that evidence did not show that the payments “served the defendants’ interests and harmed the university’s.”
