= 2014 NCAA Men's Water Polo Championship =

Water polo tournament season

Tournament details
- Dates: December 6–7, 2014
- Teams: 6

Final positions
- Champions: UCLA
- Runners-up: USC

Tournament statistics
- Matches played: 6
- Top goal scorer: Danny McClintick (UCLA) 4

Awards
- Best player: Danny McClintick (UCLA)

The 2014 NCAA Men's Water Polo Championship was the 46th annual NCAA Men's Water Polo Championship to determine the national champion of NCAA men's collegiate water polo. Tournament matches were played at UC San Diego's Canyonview Aquatic Center, La Jolla, California from December 6–7, 2014. UCLA defeated USC 9–8 to win the National Championship, its ninth NCAA men's water polo title and 112th NCAA title in school history. Danny McClintick was named the NCAA Tournament MVP.

== Qualification ==
Since there has only ever been one single national championship for water polo, all NCAA men's water polo programs (whether from Division I, Division II, or Division III) were eligible. Under the new format, six teams were invited to contest this single-elimination tournament.

== Bracket ==
Play-in
4	UCSD	12
5	Brown	7
3	Southern Cal	19
6	Whittier	4

Semifinals
1	UCLA	15
4	UCSD	6
2	Stanford	11
3	USC	12

Finals
1	UCLA	9
3	USC	8
Third place
4	UCSD	11
2	Stanford	20

== See also ==
- NCAA Men's Water Polo Championship
- NCAA Women's Water Polo Championship

== Notes ==
- UCLA – Sophomores Garrett Danner and Gordon Marshall joined McClintick on the NCAA's All-Tournament First Team. Seniors Cristiano Mirarchi and Paul Reynolds were both named to the Second Team.
- UCLA Saves – Garrett Danner 9
- USC Saves – McQuin Baron 6
