= 2015 NCAA Men's Water Polo Championship =

Water polo tournament season

Tournament details
- Dates: December 5–6, 2015
- Teams: 6

Final positions
- Champions: UCLA
- Runners-up: USC

Tournament statistics
- Matches played: 6

Awards
- Best player: Ryder Roberts, UCLA

The 2015 NCAA Men's Water Polo Championship was the 47th annual championship to determine the national champion of NCAA men's collegiate water polo. Tournament matches were played at the Spieker Aquatics Center at UCLA in Los Angeles, California from December 5–6, 2015. UCLA defeated USC for the 2015 title 10–7.

== Qualification ==
Since there has only ever been one single national championship for water polo, all NCAA men's water polo programs (whether from Division I, Division II, or Division III) were eligible. Under the new format, six teams were invited to contest this single-elimination tournament. The play-in games was played December 3, hosted by Southern California, and the championship will be held December 5 and 6, hosted by UCLA.

== Bracket ==
- Championship Site: Spieker Aquatics Center, Los Angeles, California

Play-in
5	UCSD (14-13)	12
4	Princeton (22-4)	7
3	USC (20-6)	20
6	Claremont McKenna (21–7)	5

Semifinals
1	UCLA (28-0)	17
5	UC San Diego (15-13)	4
2	California (23-6)	6
3	USC (21-6)	9

Finals
1	UCLA	10
3	USC	7
Third place
5	UC San Diego	9
2	California	20

== Notes ==
- Attendance – 1,230 (semifinals, finals)
- All Tournament First Team – Ryder Roberts (Most Valuable Player), UCLA; Blake Edwards, USC; Danny McClintick, UCLA; Luca Cupido, CAL; Mihajlo Milicevic, USC; Anthony Daboub, UCLA; Garrett Danner (Goalie), UCLA

=== Title game ===
- The Bruins converted on 4-of-8 power plays while the Trojans were just 2-for-8. Neither team attempted a penalty shot
- Saves: McQuin Baron (USC) 12, Garrett Danner (UCLA) 13

== See also ==
- NCAA Men's Water Polo Championship
- NCAA Women's Water Polo Championship
