= 2016 NCAA Men's Water Polo Championship =

Water polo tournament season

- Dates: December 3–4, 2016

The 2016 NCAA Men's Water Polo Championship was the 48th annual NCAA Men's Water Polo Championship to determine the national champion of NCAA men's collegiate water polo. Tournament matches were played at the Spieker Aquatics Complex at the University of California, Berkeley from December 3–4, 2016. The five conferences receiving automatic qualification were: the Collegiate Water Polo Association (CWPA), Mountain Pacific Sports Federation (MPSF), Northeast Water Polo Conference (NWPC), Southern California Intercollegiate Athletic Conference (SCIAC) and the Western Water Polo Association (WWPA). California defeated USC 11–8 to win the national title in double overtime.

== Qualification ==
Since there has only ever been one single national championship for water polo, all NCAA men's water polo programs (whether from Division I, Division II, or Division III) were eligible. Under the new format, seven teams are invited to contest this single-elimination tournament. The championship was held December 3 and 4, hosted by California.

=== Play-in Games ===
- Nov. 26 – Harvard (25-6) 13, Bucknell (23-5) 12 (OT), at Harvard University
- Dec. 1, 4:30 PM – Harvard (26-6) 16, UC Davis (23-5) 15, at Spieker Aquatics Complex, Berkeley
- Dec. 1, 6:30 PM – California (20-4) 16, Pomona-Pitzer (21-8) 6, at Spieker Aquatics Complex, Berkeley

== Bracket ==
Semi-Finals
3 December — 6:00 PM
USC | 19
Harvard | 4
3 December — 8:12 PM
UCLA | 8
California | 9

Final
4 December — 3:00 PM
California | 11
USC | 8

== Notes ==
- Lazar Andric from California was named MVP.

== See also ==
- NCAA Men's Water Polo Championship
- NCAA Women's Water Polo Championship
