= 1999 NCAA Men's Water Polo Championship =

Water polo tournament season

Tournament details
- Dates: December 1999
- Teams: 4

Final positions
- Champions: UCLA (6th title)
- Runners-up: Stanford (14th title game)

Tournament statistics
- Matches played: 4
- Goals scored: 70 (17.5 per match)
- Attendance: 4,441 (1,110 per match)
- Top goal scorer(s): Sean Kern, UCLA (8)

Awards
- Best player: Sean Kern, UCLA

The 1999 NCAA Men's Water Polo Championship was the 31st annual NCAA Men's Water Polo Championship to determine the national champion of NCAA men's collegiate water polo. Tournament matches were played at Canyonview Pool in La Jolla, San Diego, California during December 1999.

UCLA defeated Stanford in the final, 6–5, to win their sixth national title. The Bruins (22–3) were coached by Guy Baker and Adam Krikorian.

The Most Outstanding Player of the tournament was Sean Kern from UCLA. Kern, along with seven other players, comprised the All-Tournament Team.

Kern was also the tournament's leading scorer, with 8 goals.

== Qualification ==
Since there has only ever been one single national championship for water polo, all NCAA men's water polo programs (whether from Division I, Division II, or Division III) were eligible. A total of 4 teams were invited to contest this championship.

Team	Appearance	Previous
Stanford	23rd	1998
UC San Diego	7th	1998
Massachusetts	6th	1998
UCLA	23rd	1996

== Bracket ==
- Site: Canyonview Pool, La Jolla, San Diego, California

Semifinals
UCLA	14
Massachusetts	6
Stanford	11
UC San Diego	7

Championship
UCLA	6
Stanford	5
Third Place
Massachusetts	12
UC San Diego	9

== All-tournament team ==
- Matt Armato, UCLA
- Nick Ellis, Stanford
- Brian Heifferon, Stanford
- Pat Kain, Massachusetts
- Sean Kern, UCLA (Most outstanding player)
- Ross Mecham, UC San Diego
- Jonathan Samuels, UC San Diego
- Jonathan Skaalen, Stanford

== See also ==
- NCAA Men's Water Polo Championship
