= J. W. Krumpholz =

American water polo player (born 1987)

Personal information
- Born: September 22, 1987 (age 38) Orange County, California, U.S.
- Height: 191 cm (6 ft 3 in)
- Weight: 93 kg (205 lb)

Sport
- Sport: Swimming, Water Polo
- Position: Center
- College team: University of Southern California
- Club: Los Angeles WP Club
- Coached by: Jovan Vavic (USC)
Medal record
Men's water polo
Representing the United States
Olympic Games
Silver medal – second place	2008 Beijing	Team competition
Pan American Games
Gold medal – first place	2011 Guadalajara	Team competition

James W. "J.W." Krumpholz (born September 22, 1987) is an American water polo player. He is a member of the United States men's national water polo team at the 2008 Beijing Olympics. In the championship game, the USA team won the silver medal, defeated by Hungary.

== Early life ==
James "J. W." Krumpholz was born in Orange County, California on September 22, 1987 to Kurt and Debra Krumpholz. He attended Foothill High School in Tustin, California. From an aquatic family, Krumpholz's father, Kurt Krumpholz, was a former world-record holder in the 400-meter freestyle, establishing the record at the 1972 US Olympic trials heats, though he did not qualify for the U.S. team. J.W.'s father Kurt played water polo for UCLA where he led the team to two NCAA titles.

As a High School Senior, James was an All-CIF First Team honoree, and was announced as an Orange County Register Player of the Year. From 2003-2005, Krumpholz was a High School All-American. In club play, he competed for the Los Angeles Water Polo Club where he captured two Premier League titles.

== University of Southern California ==
Krumpholz attended and played water polo for the University of Southern California where he was trained and managed by Head Coach Jovan Vavic who coached the USC Water Polo from 1992-2019. Krumpholz was a Peter Cutino Award winner, given to the top collegiate water polo play of the year, and had scored 101 career goals prior to beginning his Senior year. With Krumpholz playing primarily in the Center position, his USC water polo team won the 2008 National Collegiate Men's Water Polo Championship on December 7, 2008, at the Avery Aquatics Center, Stanford, California. The team beat Stanford, 7-5. Krumpholz was named the MVP of the NCAA Tournament.

== 2008 Olympic silver medal ==
Krumpholz was part of the U.S. Water Polo team that won a silver medal at the 2008 Olympic Water Polo Team competition in Beijing China. Pre-game favorites, Hungary took the gold medal and Serbia took the bronze.

== Awards and honors ==
He, UCLA senior Krsto Sbutega, and Stanford's Jimmie Sandman were the three finalists for the 2009 Peter J. Cutino Award, an accolade presented annually to the outstanding female and male collegiate water polo players in the United States. Krumpholz and fellow Trojan Kami Craig won the 2009 awards.

== See also ==
- List of Olympic medalists in water polo (men)
