= Nikolaos Papanikolaou (water polo) =

Greek water polo player (born 2000)

Nikolaos Spyridon Papanikolaou
Personal information
- Nationality: Greek
- Born: 31 August 2000 (age 26) Marousi, Greece
- Height: 192 cm (76 in)
- Weight: 110 kg (243 lb)

Sport
- Sport: Water polo
- Handedness: Right
- Position: Center Forward
- Current club: Panathinaikos
- Number: 4

Senior clubs
- Years: Team
- 2017-2019: ANO Glyfada
- 2019-2024: CAL
- 2024-: Panathinaikos
Medal record
Representing Greece
World Championship
| Bronze medal – third place | 2025 Singapore | Team |
European Championship
| Bronze medal – third place | 2026 Belgrade |

Nikolaos Spyridon Papanikolaou (born 31 August 2000) is a Greek water polo player. He represented Greece at the 2024 Summer Olympics.
