= 1995 NCAA Men's Water Polo Championship =

Water polo tournament season

Tournament details
- Dates: December 1995
- Teams: 4

Final positions
- Champions: UCLA (4th title)
- Runners-up: California (17th title game)

Tournament statistics
- Matches played: 4
- Goals scored: 80 (20 per match)
- Attendance: 1,903 (476 per match)
- Top goal scorer(s): Jeremy Braxton-Brown, UCLA (8)

Awards
- Best player: Brent Albright, California; Jeremy Braxton-Brown, UCLA; Matt Swanson, UCLA; Jim Toring, UCLA

The 1995 NCAA Men's Water Polo Championship was the 27th annual NCAA Men's Water Polo Championship to determine the national champion of NCAA men's collegiate water polo. Tournament matches were played at the Avery Aquatic Center in Stanford, California during December 1995. The tournament field decreased for the first time this year, shrinking from 8 to 4 teams.

UCLA defeated California in the final, 10–8, to win their fourth national title. The Bruins (20–6) were coached by Guy Baker.

The Most Outstanding Players of the tournament were Brent Albright (California), Jeremy Braxton-Brown (UCLA), Matt Swanson (UCLA), and Jim Toring (UCLA). All four, along with five other players, comprised the All-Tournament Team.

The tournament's leading scorer, with 8 goals, was Jeremy Braxton-Brown from UCLA.

== Qualification ==
Since there has only ever been one single national championship for water polo, all NCAA men's water polo programs (whether from Division I, Division II, or Division III) were eligible. A total of 4 teams were invited to contest this championship, a decrease from the 8 teams that had contested every prior championship.

Team	Appearance	Previous
California	22nd	1994
Massachusetts	3rd	1994
UC San Diego	5th	1993
UCLA	21st	1994

== Bracket ==
- Site: Avery Aquatic Center, Stanford, California

Semifinals
California	10
Massachusetts	6
UCLA	21
UC San Diego	10

Championship
California	8
UCLA	10
Third Place
Massachusetts	7
UC San Diego	8

== All-tournament team ==
- Brent Albright, California (Most outstanding player)
- Jeremy Braxton-Brown, UCLA (Most outstanding player)
- Matt Swanson, UCLA (Most outstanding player)
- Jim Toring, UCLA (Most outstanding player)
- Pat Cochran, California
- Nick Kittredge, California
- Adam Krikorian, UCLA
- Luis Limardo, Massachusetts
- Michael Nalu, UC San Diego

== See also ==
- NCAA Men's Water Polo Championship
