= Brett Ormsby =

American water polo player (born 1982)

Personal information
- Full name: Brett Thomas Ormsby
- Nationality: United States
- Born: 1 December 1982 (age 43) San Diego, United States
- Occupations: Water Polo Coach * Cathedral Catholic High * Mission Water Polo Club
- Height: 1.90 m (6 ft 3 in)
- Weight: 83 kg (183 lb)
- Spouse: Thalia Munro

Sport
- Sport: Water Polo, Swimming
- Position: Driver (WP)
- College team: University of California Los Angeles
- Club: Bruin Water Polo
- Team: US National Team
- Coached by: Adam Krikorian (UCLA); Ratko Rudic ('04 Olympics)

Brett Thomas Ormsby (born 1 December 1982) is an American water polo player who competed for the University of California Los Angeles, where he was the team's leading scorer in all four years. He represented the United States in water polo at the 2004 Athens Olympics, where the team placed seventh overall, and Ormsby scored a goal in the game against the championship team from Hungary. Retiring from elite water polo around 2004 after the Athens Olympics, Ormsby had a successful career as a water polo coach, founding the Del Mar Water Polo Club in 2008, and later founded the Mission Water Polo Club in 2021 as part of the Del Mar Club. In 2017, Ormsby accepted a position as a water polo coach at Stanford University.

Ormsby was born December 1, 1982 in San Diego, California to Peggy and Greg Ormsby. Graduating in 2001, he attended Valhalla High School where he earned varsity letters in water polo all four years and captained the team for three years. In his Junior year, he won a varsity letter in swimming, competing in sprint freestyle, relays, and butterfly events under Valhalla coaches Pat Higginson, Head Water polo Coach, Kent Houston, and Vicki Hoffman. An able student as well as a talented athlete, in the 2000–2001 season, he was a Scholar Athlete of the Year for the California Interscholastic Federation (CIF). In the prior year, 2000, he was a San Diego Player of the Year for the California Interscholastic Federation. As a High School Senior, he scored 201 goals, completing his high school career with a total of 499 goals, a California Interscholastic Federation high school career record at the time.

== University of California Los Angeles ==
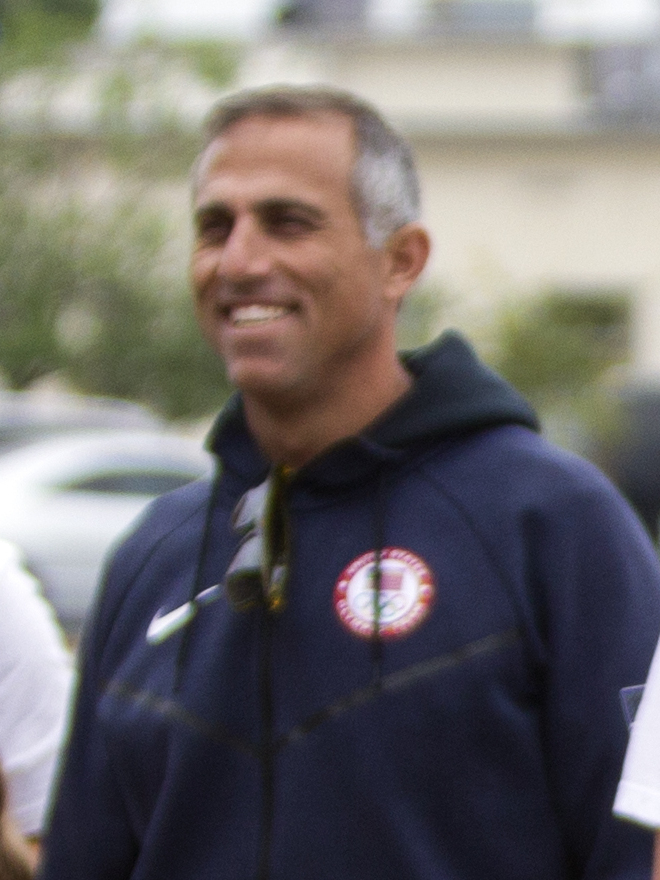
Coach A. Krikorian

From 2001 to 2004, Ormsby, a history major, played water polo for the University of California Los Angeles under Head Coach Adam Krikorian. In the 2004 season, Ormsby helped lead UCLA to the NCAA national championship with a victory over rival Stanford, where he scored several important goals. UCLA had previously won the NCAA Water Polo championship in 1999 and 2000 before Ormsby's tenure with the team. Ormsby's 2004 UCLA water polo team, had an impressive 25–3 record under Coach Krikorian. Ormsby completed his UCLA water polo career with a total of 243 goals, at the time, the second most in UCLA history. In each of his four years of collegiate play, he earned American Collegiate Water Polo Coaches All American honors, with first team honors in his final three years. In a rare distinction, he was the UCLA water polo team's highest seasonal scorer in each of his four years.

== 2004 Athens Olympics ==
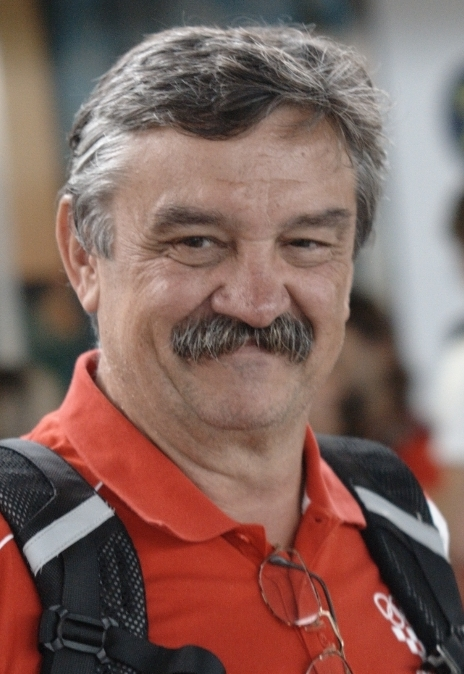
Ratko Rudic

He was a member of the United States Men's National Water Polo Team at the 2004 Athens Olympics where the US team placed seventh. Former UCLA players Brandon Brooks and Adam Wright. Ormsby competed as a Driver, scoring a goal in the game against Championship team Hungary. under Head US Olympic Water Polo Coach Ratko Rudić. where the U.S. team placed seventh. Pre-Olympic favorites Hungary earned the gold, Serbia and Montenegro won the silver, and the Russian Federation took the bronze medal.

=== Other international highlights ===
Ormsby was part of the US National water polo team what won a gold medal at the 2003 Pan American Games and another gold in the 2007 Pan American Games in Rio de Janeiro. He helped the US National Team to finish in sixth-place at the 2003 World Championships.

Ormsby married water polo player Thalia Munro around August 8, 2009, in Carpinteria, California. Munro was a member of the United States women's national water polo team that won a team bronze medal at the 2004 Athens Olympics where Ormsby and the men's team placed seventh. Munro was a graduate of UCLA with a major in Psychology who was pursuing a Masters in Education from National University at the time of their marriage. As a member of the UCLA women's water polo team, she had been part of three NCAA National Championship teams.

== Coaching ==
=== Del Mar Water Polo ===
He founded the Del Mar Water Polo Club in 2008, initially as a non-profit organization, and in 2021 founded the Mission Water Polo Club as part of the Del Mar Water Polo Club. The Del Mar Club was founded as an age group water polo program. Ormsby served as President of the extended Del Mar Water Polo Club in 2023.

=== San Diego Catholic High ===
From around 2008-2017, he taught courses and served as Head Water Polo Coach of San Diego's Cathedral Catholic High School, where he led the team to San Diego CIF Section Championships five times. He was a San Diego Coach of the Year three times while a coach at Cathedral Catholic. In 2018, he began serving as an assistant water polo coach at Stanford under Head Coach John Vargas. Ormsby has also coached water polo with the strong program at JSerra Catholic High School in Capistrano, California.

Having formerly demonstrated success as a club coach with the Del Mar Water Polo Club, in 2010-2012, Ormsby served as head coach of the USA Men's Cadet National Team, while still serving as an assistant coach for the Boy's Youth National Team, where he worked primarily with eighth and ninth grade boys, and also performed scouting duties.

=== Honors ===
In the 2004 season at UCLA, Ornsby earned the Dr. James Puffer Loyalty and Contribution Award, and the Jack Baritou Most inspirational Award. In his Senior year at UCLA, he was a finalist for the Peter J. Cutino Award, given to the season's most outstanding collegiate water polo player.
