= 1994 NCAA Men's Water Polo Championship =

Water polo tournament season

Tournament details
- Dates: December 1994
- Teams: 8

Final positions
- Champions: Stanford (8th title)
- Runners-up: USC (4th title game)

Tournament statistics
- Matches played: 12
- Goals scored: 212 (17.67 per match)
- Attendance: 3,608 (301 per match)
- Top goal scorer(s): Doug Munz, Navy (11)

Awards
- Best player: Jack Bowen (Stanford); Jeremy Laster (Stanford); Frank Schneider (Stanford)

The 1994 NCAA Men's Water Polo Championship was the 26th annual NCAA Men's Water Polo Championship to determine the national champion of NCAA men's collegiate water polo. Tournament matches were played, for the last time, at the Belmont Plaza Pool in Long Beach, California during December 1994.

In a rematch of the previous year's final, Stanford defeated USC in the final, 14–10, to win their eighth national title. The Cardinal (27–1) were coached by Dante Dettamanti.

The Most Outstanding Players of the tournament were Jack Bowen, Jeremy Laster, and Frank Schneider, all from Stanford. All three, along with five other players, comprised the All-Tournament Team.

The tournament's leading scorer, with 11 goals, was Doug Munz from Navy.

== Qualification ==
Since there has only ever been one single national championship for water polo, all NCAA men's water polo programs (whether from Division I, Division II, or Division III) were eligible. A total of 8 teams were invited to contest this championship. The following year, the field would decrease from 8 to 4.

Team	Appearance	Previous
Air Force	7th	1990
California	21st	1993
Massachusetts	2nd	1993
Navy	9th	1993
Pepperdine	12th	1992
USC	14th	1993
Stanford	21st	1993
UCLA	20th	1991

== Bracket ==
- Site: Belmont Plaza Pool, Long Beach, California

Fifth place
Pepperdine	13
Navy	10
Seventh place
Air Force	7
Massachusetts	5

Consolation semifinals
Air Force	5
Pepperdine	10
Navy	11
Massachusetts	3

First round
Stanford	20
Air Force	6
UCLA (OT)	8
Pepperdine	7
USC	15
Navy	5
California	12
Massachusetts	7

Championship semifinals
Stanford	9
UCLA	5
USC	11
California	6

Championship
Stanford	14
USC	10
Third place
UCLA	5
California	8

== All-tournament team ==
- Jack Bowen, Stanford (Most outstanding player)
- Jeremy Laster, Stanford (Most outstanding player)
- Frank Schneider, Stanford (Most outstanding player)
- Brent Albright, California
- Hrovje Cizmic, USC
- Drew Netherton, USC
- Scott Turner, UCLA
- Wolf Wigo, Stanford

== See also ==
- NCAA Men's Water Polo Championship
