= Kirk Everist =

American water polo player (born 1967)

Kirk Francis Everist
Personal information
- Born: April 12, 1967 (age 59) Houston, Texas, United States
- Occupations: Water Polo Coach: *Miramonte High 1991-2001 * U. Cal Berkeley 2002-
- Height: 190 cm (6 ft 3 in)
- Weight: 91 kg (201 lb)
- Spouse: Jen
- Children: 4

Sport
- Sport: Swimming, Water polo
- Position: Driver and Utility Player (WP)
- College team: University of California Berkeley ('90)
- Coached by: Peter J. Cutino (Berkeley)
Medal record
Representing United States
Pan American Games
Gold medal – first place	1995 Mar del Plata	Team competition

Kirk Francist Everist (born April 12, 1967) is an American water polo player and coach. He competed in Water Polo for the University of California Berkeley, and was on the U.S. Water Polo Olympic team in the 1992 Summer Olympics and the 1996 Summer Olympics. Since 2002, he has coached Water Polo at U. Cal Berkeley, where in a career of over twenty years, he has led Berkeley water polo teams to a noteworthy six NCAA national team championships in the years 2006, 2007, and 2016, and in three successive years from 2021-2023.

== Early life ==
Everist was born April 12, 1967 in Houston, Texas. He attended Miramonte High School in Orinda, California, graduating in June, 1985, where he excelled in both swimming under Miramonte Swim Coach Ray Mitchell, and Water Polo under Miramonte Coach Bill Brown. As an upperclassman, he served as a Water Polo team Captain. As a Senior in 1985, Everist secured a place on the U.S. Junior Water Polo National Team, leading to a three week trip to Cuba for Everist, which took him away from the High School swimming season. He managed to lead Miramonte swimming to a runner-up finish in the NCS finals that year, with All-America times of 46.6 in the 100 freestyle, and 1:41.1 in the 200 freestyle, while later leading the Miramonte's 4x100 freestyle relay to a very close first place finish. Miramonte High finished the swimming season with a second place record in dual meets in the Foothills League.

In 1984, Everist was named the California high school water polo player of the year, and in 1985 was a champion in the 100m and 200m freestyle. In his Junior year, Everist was the Water Polo team's second leading scorer with 54 goals, and a leader in steals with 131. He helped lead the team to the 1984 Water Polo California State Championship scoring three goals in Miramonte's win against Newport High to secure a 11-7 win.

== U.C. Berkeley ==
Kirk Everist attended U.C. Berkeley on a scholarship, graduating in 1990, where he was trained and managed primarily by USA Water Polo Hall of Fame Coach Peter J. Cutino. At Berkeley, he was an NCAA Player of the Year in 1988. In three years, he earned collegiate honors as an All-American, leading Berkeley to the 1987 and 1988 NCAA titles.

Everist was on the US national team from 1988-96, where he helped win gold medals at both the Pan American Games and Universiade in 1991.

== Olympics ==
He competed at the 1992 Summer Olympics where the U.S. Team placed fourth. Pre-game favorites Italy took the gold, Spain took the silver, and the Unified Team took the bronze. He later competed at the 1996 Summer Olympics, where the U.S. team placed seventh and Spain took the gold medal, Croatia took the silver, and Italy captured the bronze.

== Coaching ==
Everist coached at Miramonte High School from 1991-2001, where as an Assistant Coach, he led the team to eight NCS water polo championships. During Everist's 11-year tenure at Miramonte, the school produced nine league titles and three finishes of third place in California's State Tournament. From 2003-4, he coached the Northern California National Premier League.

After 2000, he served as a Head Coach of the LaMorinda Water Polo Club.

Everist coached the Northern California National Premier League Team from 2003-2004.

=== U.C. Berkeley Water Polo Coach ===
He began collegiate coaching at the University of California Berkeley, beginning in 2002, and remained a coach for over twenty years. During a 21-year coaching tenure, he has led Berkeley Water Polo to a noteworthy six NCAA National team championships. His first national titles came in 2006 and 2007, Berkeley's first successive NCAA title wins, and the team won a third national championship in 2016 over UCLA. More recently, he has led Berkeley to three successive national titles. He secured back-to-back titles in 2021-2022 against the University of Southern California, and secured a third NCAA water polo title in 2023 by a score of 13-11 against UCLA. In his first 22 seasons, he has accumulated a record at Berkeley of 460-134, for a .774 winning percentage.

=== Honors ===
In 2004, Everist became a member of the USA Water Polo Hall of Fame and the California Athletic Hall of Fame. In 2019, he became a member of the Miramonte High School Hall of Fame.
