= California Golden Bears =

Intercollegiate sports teams of the University of California, Berkeley

- University: University of California, Berkeley
- Nickname: Golden Bears
- NCAA: Division I (FBS)
- Conference: Atlantic Coast Conference (primary); Mountain Pacific Sports Federation (beach volleyball, men's gymnastics, men's rowing, water polo)
- Athletic director: Jay Larson (Co-Director of Athletics); Jenny Simon-O'Neill (Co-Director of Athletics)
- Location: Berkeley, California
- Varsity teams: 30 (14 men's, 16 women's)
- Football stadium: California Memorial Stadium
- Basketball arena: Haas Pavilion
- Baseball stadium: Evans Diamond
- Softball stadium: Levine-Fricke Field
- Soccer stadium: Edwards Stadium
- Outdoor track and field venue: Goldman Field
- Beach volleyball venue: Clark Kerr Sand Courts
- Colors: Blue and gold
- Mascot: Oski the Bear
- Fight song: Fight for California
- Cheer: Oski Yell
- Website: calbears.com
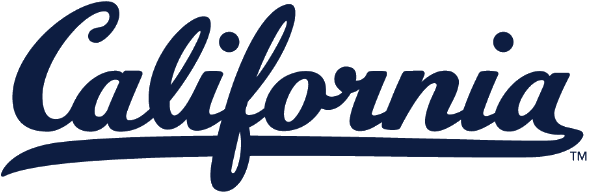

Atlantic Coast Conference logo in Cal's colors

The California Golden Bears are the athletic teams that represent the University of California, Berkeley. Referred to in athletic competition as California or Cal, the university fields 30 varsity athletic programs and various club teams in the National Collegiate Athletic Association (NCAA)'s Division I primarily as a member of the Atlantic Coast Conference (ACC), and for a limited number of sports as a member of the Mountain Pacific Sports Federation (MPSF). In 2014, Cal instituted a strict academic standard for an athlete's admission to the university. By the 2017 academic year 80 percent of incoming student athletes were required to comply with the University of California general student requirement of having a 3.0 or higher high school grade point average.

California's nickname originated in 1895 during California's dominant track and field team's tour of Midwest and Eastern universities. A blue silk banner with the golden grizzly bear, the state symbol, was displayed by the team during that tour. Since then, Cal's athletic teams have been known as the Golden Bears. Over the course of the school's history, California has won team national titles in 13 men's and 3 women's sports and 115 team titles overall. Cal athletes have also competed in the Olympics for a host of different countries.

== Varsity programs ==
Men's sports	Women's sports
Baseball	Basketball
Basketball	Beach volleyball
Cross country	Cross country
Football	Field hockey
Golf*	Golf*
Gymnastics	Gymnastics
Rowing	Lacrosse
Rugby*	Rowing
Soccer	Soccer
Swimming and diving*	Softball
Tennis	Swimming and diving
Track and field^{†}	Tennis
Water polo*	Track and field^{†}
	Volleyball
	Water polo
† – Track and field includes both indoor and outdoor * – Endowed Sports Program

=== Men's varsity programs ===
==== Football ====
The California football team began play in 1885 and has played its home games at California Memorial Stadium since 1923, except for in 2011 while the stadium was being renovated; the team played at San Francisco's AT&T Park that season. The Bears have five national titles bestowed retrospectively by "major selectors" — 1920, 1921, 1922, 1923 and 1937 (a contemporaneous selector in 1937 also chose California) — listed by the NCAA. The team also has produced two of the oddest and most memorable plays in college football: Roy "Wrong Way" Riegels' fumble recovery and run toward the Cal goal line in the 1929 Rose Bowl; and The Play in the 1982 Big Game, a game-winning, five-lateral kickoff return as time expired.

The program has produced numerous NFL stars, including:

- two Pro Football Hall of Fame enshrinees in Les Richter and Tony Gonzalez, the latter of whom is the NFL's all-time receptions leader among tight ends. Gonzalez also played basketball at Cal.
- two first overall NFL draft selections in Steve Bartkowski (1975) and Jared Goff (2016).
- several All-Pro and Pro Bowl selections or otherwise notable players, including Aaron Rodgers, Joe Kapp, Ryan Longwell, Marshawn Lynch, DeSean Jackson, Cameron Jordan, Keenan Allen, Desmond Bishop, and Jahvid Best.

Current head coach Tosh Lupoi began his tenure in 2026.

California has participated in 25 bowl games, garnering a record of 12–12–1.

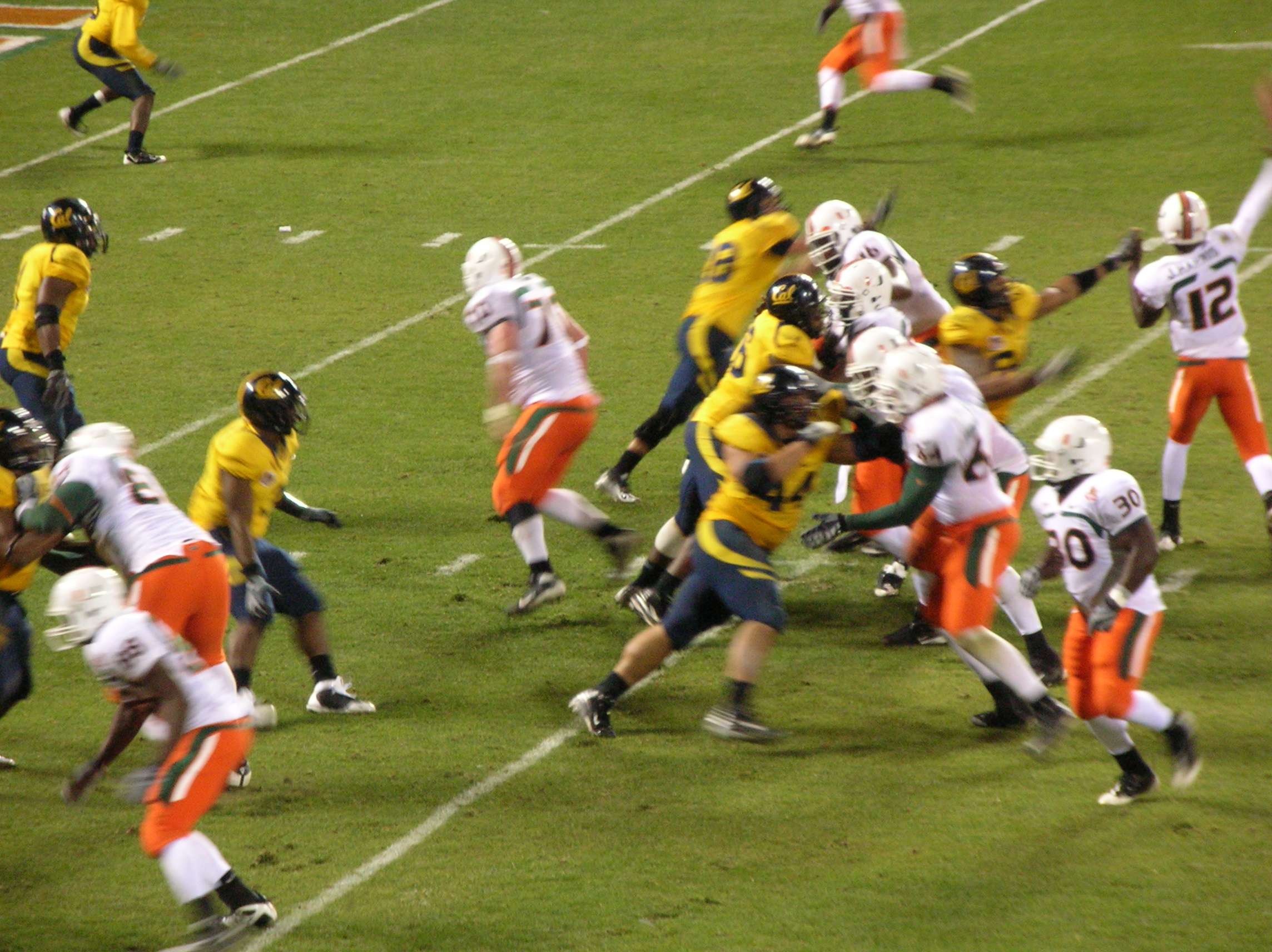
Cal at the 2008 Emerald Bowl game

Year	Coach	Bowl	Opponent	Result
1920	Andy Smith	Rose	Ohio State	W 28–0
1921	Andy Smith	Rose	Washington & Jefferson	T 0–0
1928	Nibs Price	Rose	Georgia Tech	L 7–8
1937	Stub Allison	Rose	Alabama	W 13–0
1948	Pappy Waldorf	Rose	Northwestern	L 14–20
1949	Pappy Waldorf	Rose	Ohio State	L 14–17
1950	Pappy Waldorf	Rose	Michigan	L 6–14
1958	Pete Elliott	Rose	Iowa	L 12–38
1979	Roger Theder	Garden State	Temple	L 17–28
1990	Bruce Snyder	Copper	Wyoming	W 17–15
1991	Bruce Snyder	Citrus	Clemson	W 37–13
1993	Keith Gilbertson	Alamo	Iowa	W 37–3
1996	Steve Mariucci	Aloha	Navy	L 38–42
2003	Jeff Tedford	Insight	Virginia Tech	W 52–49
2004	Jeff Tedford	Holiday	Texas Tech	L 31–45
2005	Jeff Tedford	Las Vegas	BYU	W 35–28
2006	Jeff Tedford	Holiday	Texas A&M	W 45–10
2007	Jeff Tedford	Armed Forces	Air Force	W 42–36
2008	Jeff Tedford	Emerald	Miami	W 24–17
2009	Jeff Tedford	Poinsettia	Utah	L 27–37
2011	Jeff Tedford	Holiday	Texas	L 10–21
2015	Sonny Dykes	Armed Forces	Air Force	W 55–36
2018	Justin Wilcox	Cheez-It	TCU	L 7–10
2019	Justin Wilcox	Redbox	Illinois	W 35–20
2023	Justin Wilcox	Independence	Texas Tech Red Raiders	L 14-34
2024	Justin Wilcox	Los Angeles	UNLV	L 13-24

==== Basketball ====
The California men's basketball team has represented the University of California intercollegiately since 1907 and subsequently began full conference play in 1915. Cal basketball's home court is Haas Pavilion, which was constructed atop of the old Harmon Gymnasium using money donated in the late 1990s in part by the owners of Levi-Strauss. The program has seen success throughout the years culminating in a national championship in 1959 under legendary coach Pete Newell and have reached the final four two other times in 1946 and 1960. The 1926–27 team finished the season with a 17–0 record and was retroactively named the national champion by the Premo-Porretta Power Poll.

The current head coach of the California men's basketball program is Mark Madsen. Some notable NBA players that spent time playing in Berkeley include Jaylen Brown, Jason Kidd, Kevin Johnson, and Darrall Imhoff.

==== Baseball ====
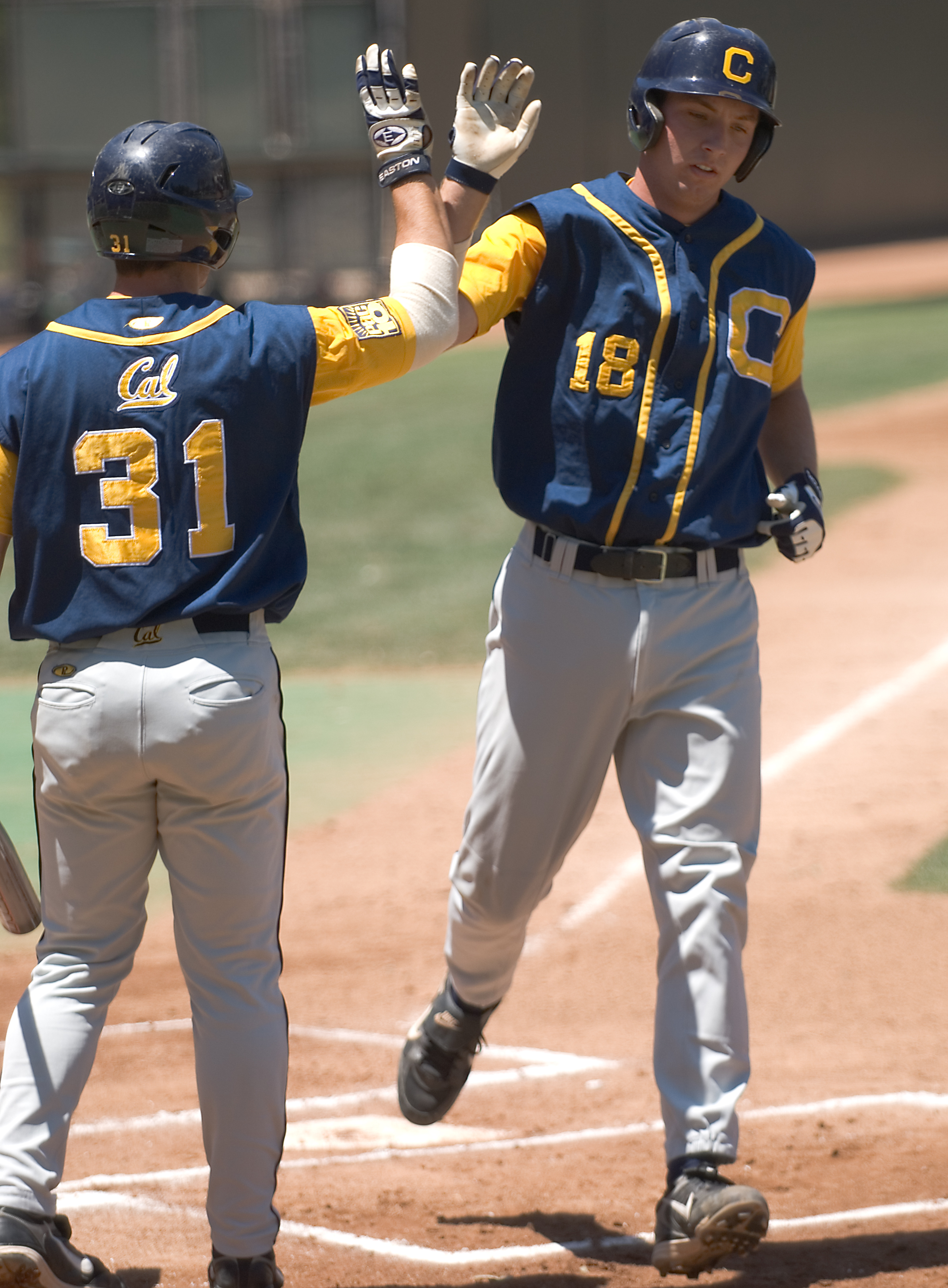
Cal baseball players at Jackie Robinson Stadium in 2007

The Cal baseball team plays at Evans Diamond, located between Haas Pavilion, the Recreational Sports Facility (RSF), and Edward's Track Stadium. Cal has appeared in the post-season a total of nine times, including five times in the College World Series; Cal won the title in 1947 and 1957. The team is currently coached by Mike Neu, who took the helm in 2018.

In September 2010, the university announced that baseball would be one of five sports cut as a cost-cutting measure. However, in April 2011, after receiving more than $9 million in pledges from supporters of the program, the program was reinstated. In June 2011, the team made its most recent appearance in the College World Series.

Perhaps the most famous Cal player was second baseman Jeff Kent, who led the Golden Bears to the 1988 College World Series, and would go on to be named the 2000 National League Most Valuable Player as a member of the San Francisco Giants. Shortstop Geoff Blum of Cal's 1992 College World Series team hit the game-winning home run in the 14th inning of Game 3 of the 2005 World Series for the Chicago White Sox.

Current Golden Bears in Major League Baseball include New York Mets outfielder Mark Canha, Texas Rangers shortstop Marcus Semien, and Chicago White Sox first baseman and left fielder Andrew Vaughn. Vaughn is Cal's highest ever MLB draft selection, having been selected third overall by the White Sox in 2019. San Diego Padres manager Bob Melvin also played at Cal, having helped the team earn third place in the 1980 College World Series.

==== Bowling (discontinued) ====
Men's bowling was a varsity-level intercollegiate sport at the University of California in the 1970s and won a national championship in 1979, governed by the ABC (now the U.S. Bowling Congress).

==== Crew ====
Crew (rowing) has a long and storied history as the oldest sport at the university, beginning with the formation of the University of California Boat Club in 1875. Competitive racing as known today began in 1893. In 1928, 1932, and 1948, Cal crews won gold at the Olympics while representing the United States.

National champions:

- Varsity 8 (19): 1928, 1932, 1934, 1935, 1939, 1949, 1960, 1961, 1964, 1976, 1999, 2000, 2001, 2002, 2006, 2010, 2016, 2022, 2023
- Second varsity 8 (11): 1941, 1947, 1951, 1959, 1999, 2001, 2002, 2003, 2014, 2019, 2023
- Freshman 8 (9): 1938, 1982, 1998, 2000, 2004, 2005, 2007, 2008, 2011
- Third varsity 8 (2): 2014, 2023
- Varsity 4 with coxswain (5): 2001, 2002, 2007, 2009, 2023

==== Cross country ====
The University of California's intercollegiate cross country team is under the direction of head coach Bobby Lockhart, who took over the program in 2019 after spending time at UNC-Chapel Hill and Oklahoma State.

The California Golden Bears men's cross country team appeared in the NCAA Cross Country Championships five times, with their highest finish being 16th place in the 2007–08 school year.

Year	Gender	Ranking	Points
2007	Men	No. 16	434
2008	Men	No. 22	477
2010	Men	No. 31	678
2015	Men	No. 23	524
2016	Men	No. 31	776

==== Rifle (discontinued) ====
Men's rifle began intercollegiate competition at the University of California in the 19th century and won 5 national championships in the 1950s. At that time, the national event required five firing members per team, one alternate, a team captain and a coach. The national championship competition consisted of ten shots per firing member at 50 feet, indoors.

==== Rugby ====
The Golden Bears rugby team has won 33 championships since the national collegiate championships for rugby began in 1980. Current head coach and Cal alumnus Jack Clark took over the team in 1984, and has achieved prolonged success, leading the Bears to 28 national titles, including twelve consecutive championships from 1991 to 2002, five more consecutive titles from 2004 to 2008, and back-to-back titles in 2010 to 2011 and 2016 to 2017.

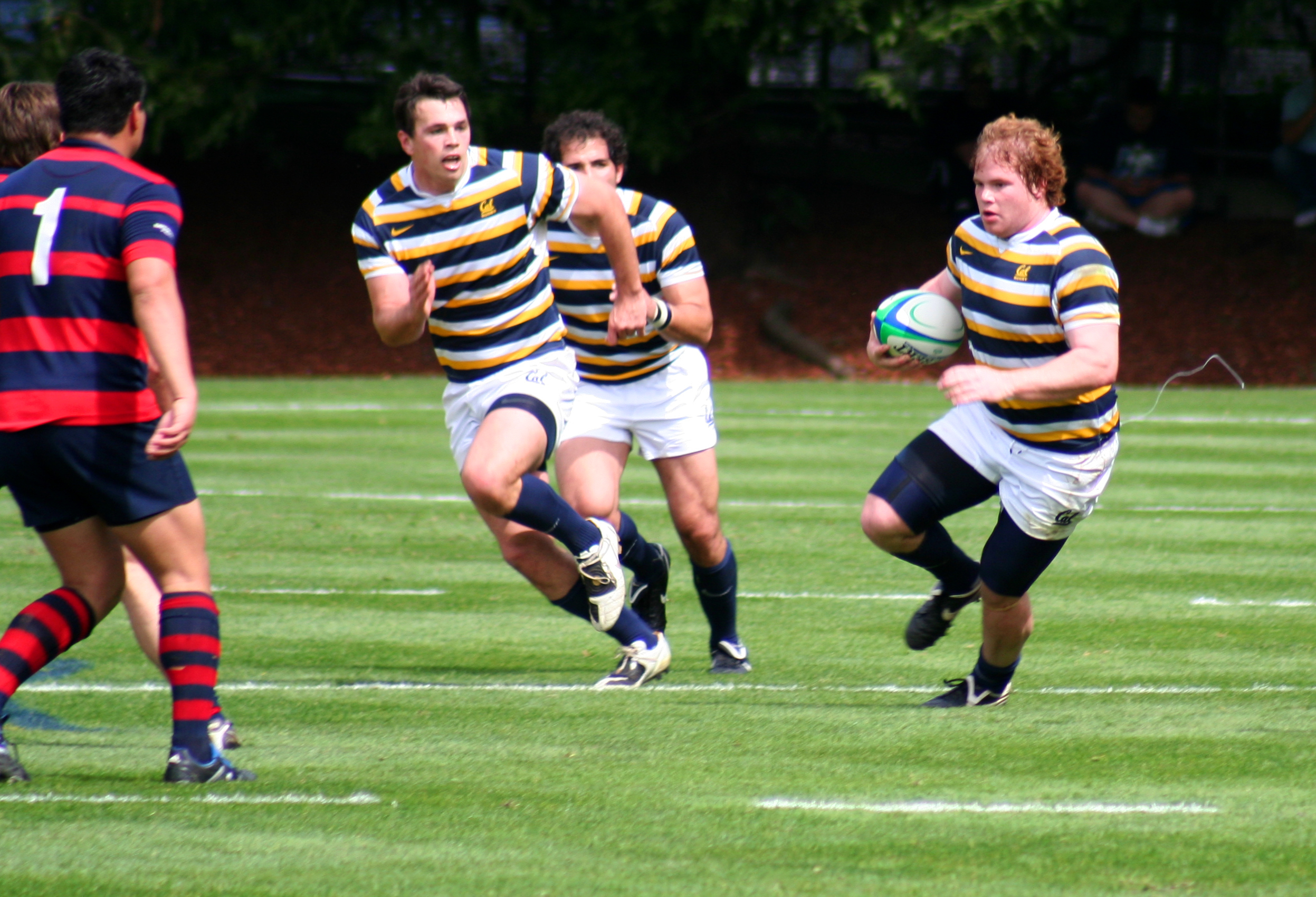
Cal's rugby game against the Saint Mary's Gaels in 2010

Cal also has competed in the Collegiate Rugby Championship (CRC), the highest profile college rugby sevens tournament in the U.S., winning the title each year from 2013 to 2017. The CRC was held every June from 2011 through 2019 at Subaru Park in the Philadelphia area. Cal also reached the finals of the 2010 CRC, losing to Utah in sudden death extra time, and finished third in the 2012 CRC. Cal won the 2013, 2014, 2015 and 2016 CRC titles.

In September 2010, the university announced that rugby would be one of five varsity sports cut as a cost-cutting measure, though the team would have continued to represent the university as a "varsity club sport." A large group of rugby supporters organized to oppose the relegation. On February 11, 2011, the administration reversed its decision on rugby and two other sports, thus continuing them as sponsored varsity sports.

==== Soccer ====
Men's soccer began intercollegiate competition at the University of California in 1906 and has won no national championships and 4 conference championships. The team currently plays its home games at Edwards Stadium and the head coach (in his 12th season) is Kevin Grimes. Steve Birnbaum was the #2 pick in the first round in the 2014 MLS SuperDraft.

The California Golden Bears men's soccer team has an NCAA Division I Tournament record of 14–19 through nineteen appearances.

Year	Record	Seed	Region	Round	Opponent	Results
1960	6–2	—N/a	St. Louis	Quarterfinal	Saint Louis	L 0–2
1977	11–5–3	—N/a	San Francisco	Second Round	UCLA	L 1–3
1981	13–5–1	—N/a	Berkeley	First round	San Diego State	L 0–4
1983	17–3	—N/a	Las Vegas	First round	UNLV	L 1–3 (OT)
1985	16–4–1	—N/a	Los Angeles	First round	UCLA	L 1–3
1986	15–4–2	—N/a	St. Louis	First round	Saint Louis	L 0–2
1996	12–6–2	—N/a	Seattle	First round	Fresno State	L 1–2
2001	10–8–1	—N/a	Stanford	First round	Santa Clara	L 0–1 (3OT)
2002	13–5–2	—N/a	Los Angeles	Second Round; Third round	UC Santa Barbara; UCLA	W 2–1; L 1–2
2003	10–8–2	—N/a	New York	First round Second Round	San Jose State; UC Santa Barbara	W 2–0; L 0–2
2004	12–3–3	—N/a	Indianapolis	First round Second Round	Santa Clara; No. 7 SMU	W 2–1 (OT); L 0–1
2005	13–3–2	No. 7	Albuquerque	Second Round; Third round Quarterfinals	Santa Clara; Wake Forest; No. 2 New Mexico	T 0–0 (PK); W 3–2 (2OT); L 0–1
2006	12–5–1	No. 13	Charlottesville	Second Round; Third round	New Mexico; No. 4 Virginia	W 3–1; L 1–2
2007	11–5–2	—N/a	Providence	First round Second Round	UC Davis; No. 11 Virginia Tech	W 2–1 (OT); L 2–3
2008	11–5–2	—N/a	College Park	First round Second Round; Third round	San Francisco; No. 15 UC Santa Barbara; No. 2 Maryland	W 3–0; W 3–2 (2OT); L 1–2
2010	12–2–3	No. 6	Akron	Second Round; Third round Quarterfinals	Santa Barbara; Brown; No. 3 Akron	W 2–1 (OT); W 2–0; T 3–3 (PK)
2013	12–4–2	No. 4	Berkeley	Second Round; Third round Quarterfinals	Bradley; Coastal Carolina; No. 5 Maryland	W 3–1; W 1–0; W 1–0; L 1–2
2014	12–4–2	No. 15	Los Angeles	Second Round; Third round	SIU Edwardsville; No. 2 UCLA	W 1–0; L 2–3

==== Tennis ====
Doug Eisenman won the NCAA Division I doubles title with Matt Lucena in 1990.

==== Water polo ====
The California Golden Bears men's water polo team have an NCAA Division I Tournament record of 58–15 through twenty-nine appearances.

Year	Round	Opponent	Result
1969	First round Semifinals; National Championship	UC Irvine; UC Santa Barbara; UCLA	W 5–4; W 6–4; L 2–5
1973	First round Semifinals; National Championship	New Mexico; UCLA; UC Irvine	W 8–1; W 4–2; W 8–4
1974	First round Semifinals; National Championship	Air Force; CSU Fullerton; UC Irvine	W 12–3; W 12–3; W 7–6
1975	First round Semifinals; National Championship	Long Beach State; UCLA; UC Irvine	W 9–6; W 13–9; W 9–8
1977	First round Semifinals; National Championship	Bucknell; Pepperdine; UC Irvine	W 28–10; W 11–10; W 8–6
1978	First round Semifinals; National Championship	Texas A&M; UC Irvine; Stanford	W 15–6; W 7–5; L 6–7
1979	First round Semifinals	Air Force; UCLA	W 19–7; L 9–10
1980	First round Semifinals; National Championship	UC Santa Barbara; UC Irvine; Stanford	W 11–7; W 9–7; L 6–8
1981	First round Semifinals	UCLA; Long Beach State	W 10–7; L 9–11
1982	First round Semifinals	USC; UC Irvine	W 7–6; L 5–8
1983	First round Semifinals; National Championship	Slippery Rock; Long Beach State; USC	W 15–2; W 8–5; W 10–7
1984	First round Semifinals; National Championship	Loyola (IL); USC; Stanford	W 11–3; W 10–9; W 9–8
1986	First round Semifinals; National Championship	Brown; UCLA; Stanford	W 11–4; W 11–8; L 6–9
1987	First round Semifinals; National Championship	Brown; UC Irvine; USC	W 18–3; W 7–3; W 9–8
1988	First round Semifinals; National Championship	UALR; Stanford; UCLA	W 17–6; W 10–6; W 14–11
1989	First round Semifinals; National Championship	Brown; Pepperdine; UC Irvine	W 15–2; W 10–9; L 8–9
1990	First round Semifinals; National Championship	Brown; UCLA; Stanford	W 16–6; W 10–8; W 8–7
1991	First round Semifinals; National Championship	Navy; UC Irvine; UCLA	W 13–6; W 13–10; W 7–6
1992	First round Semifinals; National Championship	Navy; UC Irvine; Stanford	W 15–2; W 8–5; W 12–11
1993	First round Semifinals	Massachusetts; USC	W 17–4; L 11–12
1994	First round Semifinals	Massachusetts; USC	W 12–7; L 6–11
1995	Semifinals; National Championship	Massachusetts; UCLA	W 10–6; L 8–10
2002	Semifinals; National Championship	Queens College; Stanford	W 14–6; L 6–7
2006	Semifinals; National Championship	UC San Diego; USC	W 17–7; W 7–6
2007	Semifinals; National Championship	Navy; USC	W 8–5; W 8–6
2010	Semifinals; National Championship	Loyola Marymount; USC	W 7–6; L 10–12
2015	Semifinals	USC	L 6–9
2016	Quarterfinals; Semifinals; National Championship	Pomona–Pitzer; UCLA; USC	W 16–6; W 9–8; W 11–8
2017	Semifinals	USC	L 11–12
2023	Quarterfinals; Semifinals; National Championship	UCLA	W 16–6; W 10–9; W 13–11

=== Women's varsity programs ===
==== Volleyball ====
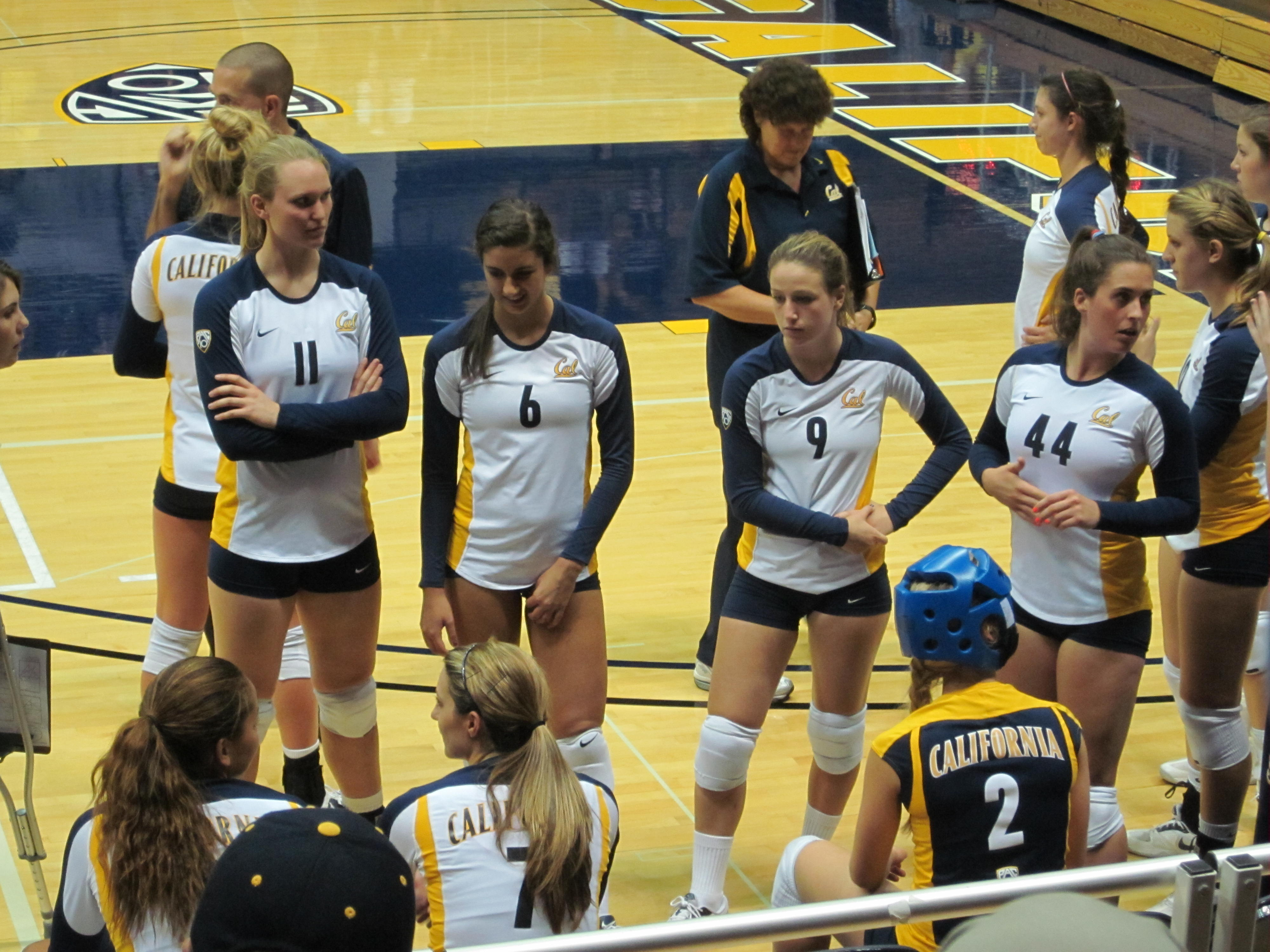
Cal women's volleyball team in 2009

The California Golden Bears women's volleyball team have an NCAA Division I Tournament record of 26–17 through seventeen appearances. Despite appearing in the NCAA national championship game in 2010, they have yet to win a national title. Some former Bears that have gone pro include all-time kills leader Hana Cutura, former US Olympian and all-time assists leader Carli Lloyd, Mia Jerkov, Lara Vukasovic, Jenelle Jordan, and Maddie Haynes. The team is currently coached by Sam Crosson.

Year	Round	Opponent	Result
1981; AIAW	Pool Play; Pool Play; Consolation; 9th Place Game	Utah State; Minnesota; North Carolina; Pittsburgh	L 2-3; L 2-3; W 2-0; L 1-2
1982	First round Regional semifinals	Pepperdine; San Diego State	W 3–0; L 1–3
1983	First round Regional semifinals	Oregon State; Pacific	W 3–2; L 0–3
1987	First round	UCLA	L 1–3
1988	First round	UCLA	L 0–3
1989	First round Regional semifinals	Florida State; Texas	W 3–1; L 0–3
2002	First round Second Round	Santa Clara; UC Santa Barbara	W 3–1; L 0–3
2003	First round Second Round; Regional semifinals	Saint Mary's; Michigan; Georgia Tech	W 3–0; W 3–0; L 1–3
2004	First round Second Round	Pacific; Saint Mary's	W 3–2; L 2–3
2005	First round Second Round	Valparaiso; Wisconsin	W 3–0; L 0–3
2006	First round Second Round; Regional semifinals	LSU; Cal Poly; Stanford	W 3–0; W 3–1; L 0–3
2007	First round Second Round; Regional semifinals Regional Finals; Semifinals	Liberty; Duke; Iowa State; Nebraska; Penn State	W 3–1; W 3–1; W 3–0; W 3–0; L 0–3
2008	First round Second Round; Regional semifinals Regional Finals	Siena; New Mexico State; Illinois; Penn State	W 3–0; W 3–1; W 3–0; L 0–3
2009	First round Second Round; Regional semifinals Regional Finals	Lipscomb; Ohio State; Baylor; Penn State	W 3–0; W 3–1; W 3–0; L 0–3
2010	First round Second Round; Regional semifinals Regional Finals; Semifinals; National Championship	Utah State; North Carolina; Minnesota; Washington; USC; Penn State	W 3–0; W 3–0; W 3–0; W 3–0; W 3–0; L 0–3
2011	First round	North Carolina	L 2–3
2012	First round	North Carolina	L 1–3
2013	First round Second Round	North Carolina; Wisconsin	W 3–0; L 0–3

==== Basketball ====
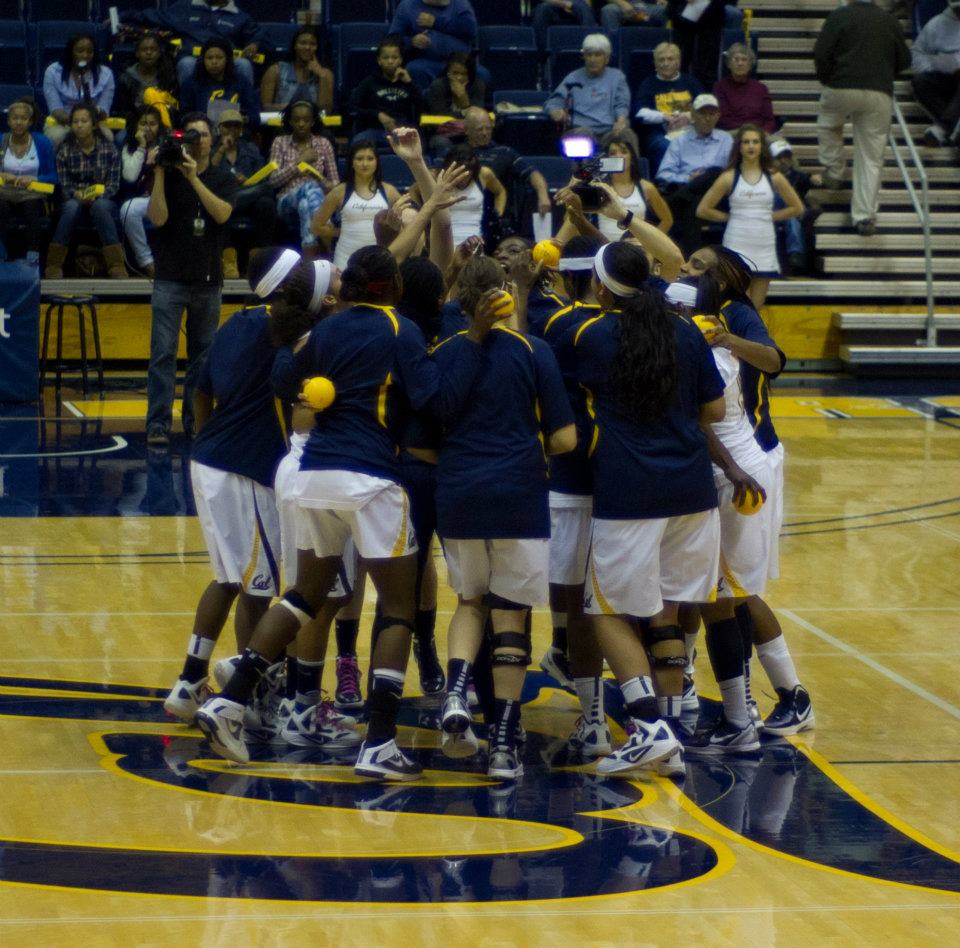
The 2012 Cal Women's Basketball team before a game

California's women's basketball team has made 14 NCAA tournament appearances, their best result being a Final Four appearance in 2013. The team has also won one WNIT championship, in 2010.

In 2009–10, under Joanne Boyle, the Bears's top-10 recruiting class and star senior Alexis Gray-Lawson) rebounded from a rough start to their season to win the WNIT. The championship game against Miami (FL) was the first ever championship game held at Haas Pavilion. Gray-Lawson ended her career as the all-time Cal leader in three points made and games played.

In 2012–13, under second-year head coach Lindsay Gottlieb, the Cal women reached a record AP and USA Today Coaches Poll #6 ranking at the end of the season, earning the 2 seed in the Spokane region of the NCAA tournament. The Bears reached the first Final Four in school history. In June 2019, Gottlieb became the first NCAA women's head coach to be hired to an NBA coaching staff when she became an assistant coach for the Cleveland Cavaliers.

The current women's basketball head coach is Charmin Smith. Notable alumni of the team include first-round WNBA draft selections Layshia Clarendon and Kristine Anigwe. Anigwe holds the team's all-time scoring and rebounding records.

==== Softball ====
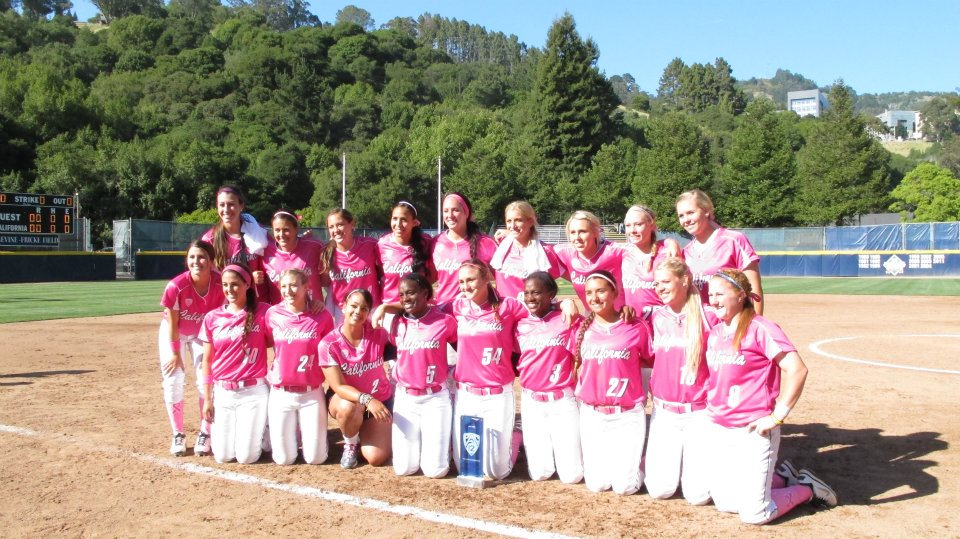
Cal softball team (wearing pink because of "strike out cancer" day), winners in 2012

In 2002, the Cal softball team won its first national championship against Arizona. Some notable players include Candace Harper, third baseman, and Jocelyn Forest, pitcher, both of whom were team captains. The 2002 Women's College World Series took place in Oklahoma City, Oklahoma. Softball began intercollegiate competition at the University of California in 1972. The team has won one national championship and 6 conference championships. The team currently plays at the 1,204 seat Levine-Fricke Field in Strawberry Canyon, and the current head coach is former Cal shortstop Chelsea Spencer, who was a member of the 2002 WCWS-winning team.

Note: Both Cal and the NCAA consider appearances at the AIAW women's final tournament (which was also named and promoted as the "Women's College World Series"), prior to the first NCAA softball WCWS on May 27–30, 1982, to be equivalent to NCAA WCWS appearances.

==== Cross country ====
The California Golden Bears women's cross country team appeared in the NCAA tournament four times, with their highest finish being 9th place in the 1988–89 school year.

Year	Gender	Ranking	Points
1984	Women	No. 15	323
1988	Women	No. 9	236
2011	Women	No. 18	433
2017	Women	No. 22	530

==== Field hockey ====
Cal was a member of the Northern Pacific Field Hockey Conference (NorPac) from the league's founding in 1982 until its demise at the end of the 2014 season. The four NorPac members from California (Cal, Pacific, Stanford, and UC Davis) became single-sport members of the America East Conference starting with the 2015 season. Cal and Stanford would move their women's field hockey programs to the ACC with most other varsity sports in 2024.

The California Golden Bears women's hockey team have an NCAA Division I Tournament record of 1–10 through ten appearances.

Year	Round	Opponent	Result
1980; AIAW	First round Quarterfinals; Semifinals; National Championship	Ursinus; New Hampshire; San Jose State; Penn State	W 1-0; W 2-0; W 2-1 (2ot); L 1-2
1981; AIAW	Quarterfinals; Consolation; 5th Place Game	Temple; Virginia; Washington State	L 1-3; W 3-0; W 1-0 (ot)
1982	First round Quarterfinals	San Jose State; Penn State	W 2–1 (2ot); L 1–2 (2ot, ps)
1983	First round	North Carolina	L 1–2
1992	First round	Ball State	L 0–1
1993	First round	Northwestern	L 2–3
1994	First round	Iowa	L 2–3
2001	First round	Syracuse	L 0–1
2002	First round	Wake Forest	L 0–8
2003	First round	Maryland	L 0–2
2005	First round	Wake Forest	L 0–1
2006	First round	Ohio State	L 1–3

==== Gymnastics ====
The Golden Bears women's gymnastics program first competed in 1976 in the AIAW under head coach Sue Williamson. Since women's gymnastics began as an NCAA sponsored sport in 1982, they have appeared in the NCAA tournament 28 times. Their highest finish was in 2024 when they finished second.

==== Rowing ====
The 1980 Cal women's crew dominated the national collegiate championships. They won the varsity eight, Cal's first ever varsity national championship in any women's sport, and also captured the varsity four and finished second in the junior varsity eight. The Bears also captured national titles in the varsity four in 1981 and the novice eight in 1984. The team won NCAA championships in 2005, 2006, 2016 and 2018.

==== Soccer ====
Women's soccer began intercollegiate competition at the University of California in 1982 and has won no national championships and 1 conference championship. The team currently plays at Edwards Stadium and the head coach (in his 5th season) is Neil McGuire. Notable alums include Olympic Gold Medalist and 2015 and 2019 World Cup Champion Alex Morgan, and Betsy Hassett of the New Zealand Women's National Team.

The California Golden Bears women's soccer team has an NCAA Division I Tournament record of 16–25 through twenty-five appearances.

Year	Round	Opponent	Result
1983	First round Second Round	Cincinnati; North Carolina	W 5–0; L 2–5
1984	First round Second Round; Semifinals	UC Santa Barbara; Colorado College; North Carolina	W 2–0; W 1–0; L 1–2
1986	First round Second Round	CSU East Bay; Colorado College	W 2–0; L 0–1
1987	Second Round; Semifinals	UC Santa Barbara; North Carolina	W 3–0; L 0–4
1988	First round Second Round; Semifinals	Saint Mary's; Colorado College; NC State	W 2–0; W 2–1; L 0–1
1993	First round	Stanford	L 0–2
1998	First round	Pacific	L 1–2
1999	First round	BYU	L 0–2
2000	Second Round	Santa Clara	L 0–2
2001	First round	Saint Mary's	L 2–3
2002	First round Second Round	Denver; Stanford	W 2–0; L 0–1
2004	First round	Santa Clara	L 1–2
2005	First round Second Round; Third round	Rice; UTEP; Florida State	W 2–0; W 2–1; L 1–2
2006	First round Second Round	Auburn; Florida State	W 3–1; L 1–3
2007	First round Second Round	Santa Clara; Stanford	W 2–0; L 1–2
2008	First round	Florida	L 1–2
2009	First round Second Round	Auburn; Florida State	W 2–1; L 0–3
2010	First round	Duke	L 1–2
2011	First round Second Round	Santa Clara; Boston College	W 2–1; L 0–1
2012	First round Second Round	Pepperdine; San Diego State	W 1–0; L 1–2
2013	First round	Santa Clara	L 1–2
2014	First round Second Round	San Diego State; Florida	W 3–2; L 1–3
2015	First round	Loyola Marymount	L 0–1
2016	First round	Pepperdine	L 1–2
2017	First round	Santa Clara	L 1–2

==== Water polo ====
Women's Water Polo began intercollegiate competition at the University of California in 1996 and has won no national championships and 2 conference championships. The team currently plays at the Spieker Aquatics Complex near Haas Pavilion and the head coach (in her 2nd season) is Coralie Simmons.

== Championships ==
=== Tournament appearances ===
The California Golden Bears competed in the NCAA tournament across 26 active sports (12 men's and 14 women's) 627 times at the Division I Level.

- Baseball (13): 1947, 1957, 1980, 1985, 1988, 1991, 1992, 1995, 2001, 2008, 2010, 2011, 2015, 2019
- Men's basketball (19): 1946, 1957, 1958, 1959, 1960, 1990, 1993, 1994, 1996, 1997, 2001, 2002, 2003, 2006, 2009, 2010, 2012, 2013, 2016
- Women's basketball (16): 1982 (AIAW), 1990, 1992, 1993, 2006, 2007, 2008, 2009, 2012, 2013, 2014, 2015, 2016, 2017, 2018, 2019
- Men's cross country (5): 2007, 2008, 2010, 2015, 2016
- Women's cross country (4): 1984, 1988, 2011, 2017
- Field hockey (12): 1980 (AIAW), 1981 (AIAW), 1982, 1983, 1992, 1993, 1994, 2001, 2002, 2003, 2005, 2006
- Men's golf (15): 1939, 1948, 1949, 1995, 1998, 1999, 2000, 2004, 2010, 2011, 2012, 2013, 2014, 2016, 2019
- Women's golf (10): 2001, 2002, 2003, 2004, 2005, 2006, 2011, 2014, 2015, 2017
- Men's gymnastics (48): 1948, 1949, 1950, 1951, 1952, 1953, 1954, 1955, 1956, 1957, 1959, 1960, 1961, 1962, 1963, 1964, 1966, 1967, 1968, 1969, 1970, 1973, 1974, 1975, 1976, 1982, 1996, 1997, 1998, 2000, 2001, 2002, 2003, 2004, 2005, 2006, 2007, 2008, 2009, 2010, 2011, 2012, 2013, 2014, 2015, 2018, 2019, 2021, 2022
- Women's gymnastics (15): 1992, 1996, 1997, 1998, 2001, 2003, 2004, 2007, 2013, 2014, 2015, 2016, 2017, 2018, 2019, 2022
- Rowing (21): 1999, 2000, 2001, 2002, 2003, 2004, 2005, 2006, 2007, 2008, 2009, 2010, 2011, 2012, 2013, 2014, 2015, 2016, 2017, 2018, 2019
- Men's soccer (20): 1960, 1977, 1981, 1983, 1985, 1986, 1996, 2001, 2002, 2003, 2004, 2005, 2006, 2007, 2008, 2010, 2013, 2014, 2017, 2019
- Women's soccer (26): 1983, 1984, 1986, 1987, 1988, 1993, 1998, 1999, 2000, 2001, 2002, 2004, 2005, 2006, 2007, 2008, 2009, 2010, 2011, 2012, 2013, 2014, 2015, 2016, 2017, 2019
- Softball (35): 1980 (AIAW), 1981 (AIAW), 1982 (AIAW), 1986, 1987, 1988, 1989, 1990, 1991, 1992, 1993, 1994, 1995, 1996, 1997, 1998, 1999, 2000, 2001, 2002, 2003, 2004, 2005, 2006, 2007, 2008, 2009, 2010, 2011, 2012, 2013, 2015, 2016, 2017, 2018
- Men's swimming and diving (56): 1943, 1947, 1951, 1952, 1956, 1957, 1959, 1963, 1968, 1970, 1972, 1975, 1976, 1977, 1978, 1979, 1980, 1981, 1982, 1983, 1984, 1985, 1986, 1987, 1988, 1989, 1990, 1991, 1992, 1993, 1994, 1995, 1996, 1997, 1998, 1999, 2000, 2001, 2002, 2003, 2004, 2005, 2006, 2007, 2008, 2009, 2010, 2011, 2012, 2013, 2014, 2015, 2016, 2017, 2018, 2019
- Women's swimming and diving (37): 1983, 1984, 1985, 1986, 1987, 1988, 1989, 1990, 1991, 1992, 1993, 1994, 1995, 1996, 1997, 1998, 1999, 2000, 2001, 2002, 2003, 2004, 2005, 2006, 2007, 2008, 2009, 2010, 2011, 2012, 2013, 2014, 2015, 2016, 2017, 2018, 2019
- Men's tennis (37): 1977, 1978, 1979, 1980, 1981, 1982, 1983, 1986, 1987, 1988, 1989, 1990, 1991, 1995, 1996, 1997, 1998, 2000, 2001, 2002, 2003, 2004, 2005, 2006, 2007, 2008, 2009, 2010, 2011, 2012, 2013, 2014, 2015, 2016, 2017, 2018, 2019
- Women's tennis (37): 1982 (AIAW), 1983, 1984, 1985, 1986, 1987, 1988, 1989, 1990, 1991, 1992, 1993, 1994, 1995, 1996, 1997, 1998, 1999, 2000, 2001, 2002, 2003, 2004, 2005, 2006, 2007, 2008, 2009, 2010, 2011, 2012, 2013, 2014, 2015, 2016, 2017, 2019
- Men's indoor track and field (17): 1968, 1989, 1990, 1992, 1994, 1995, 1997, 2007, 2008, 2009, 2010, 2011, 2013, 2014, 2017, 2018, 2019
- Women's indoor track and field (12): 1990, 2001, 2004, 2006, 2007, 2008, 2009, 2011, 2012, 2016, 2021, 2022
- Men's outdoor track and field (79): 1922, 1930, 1931, 1934, 1935, 1936, 1937, 1938, 1939, 1940, 1941, 1942 1943, 1946, 1947, 1948, 1949, 1950, 1951, 1952 1953, 1954, 1956, 1957, 1958, 1959, 1960, 1961, 1962, 1963, 1964, 1965, 1966, 1967, 1968, 1970, 1971, 1973, 1974, 1975, 1976, 1977, 1979, 1980, 1981, 1982, 1983, 1984, 1985, 1986, 1987, 1988, 1990, 1991, 1992, 1993, 1994, 1995, 1996, 1997, 1998, 1999, 2000, 2001, 2002, 2004, 2005, 2006, 2007, 2008, 2009, 2010, 2011, 2012, 2015, 2017, 2019, 2021, 2022
- Women's outdoor track and field (29): 1982, 1983, 1984, 1985, 1986, 1987, 1988, 1989, 1990, 1992, 1995, 1996, 1997, 1998, 1999, 2000, 2001, 2002, 2004, 2005, 2006, 2007, 2008, 2011, 2012, 2016, 2019, 2021, 2022
- Women's volleyball (18): 1981 (AIAW), 1982, 1983, 1987, 1988, 1989, 2002, 2003, 2004, 2005, 2006, 2007, 2008, 2009, 2010, 2011, 2012, 2013
- Men's water polo (30): 1969, 1973, 1974, 1975, 1977, 1978, 1979, 1980, 1981, 1982, 1983, 1984, 1986, 1987, 1988, 1989, 1990, 1991, 1992, 1993, 1994, 1995, 2002, 2006, 2007, 2010, 2015, 2016, 2017, 2023
- Women's water polo (7): 2010, 2011, 2014, 2015, 2017, 2019

=== Team ===
The Golden Bears of California earned 43 NCAA championships at the Division I level, plus 5 unofficial men's football titles claimed by the school.

- Men's (34)
  - Baseball (2): 1947, 1957
  - Basketball (1): 1959
  - Golf (1): 2004
  - Gymnastics (4): 1968, 1975, 1997, 1998
  - Outdoor track and field (1): 1922
  - Swimming and diving (8): 1979, 1980, 2011, 2012, 2014, 2019, 2022, 2023
  - Water polo (17): 1973, 1974, 1975, 1977, 1983, 1984, 1987, 1988, 1990, 1991, 1992, 2006, 2007, 2016, 2021, 2022, 2023
- Women's (9)
  - Rowing (4): 2005, 2006, 2016, 2018
  - Softball (1): 2002
  - Swimming (4): 2009, 2011, 2012, 2015

Results

School year	Sport	Opponent	Score
1920–21	Football	Ohio State	28–0
1921–22	Football	Washington & Jefferson	0–0
1921–22	Men's outdoor track and field	Penn State	28.5–19.5
1922–23	Football	Stanford	28–0
1923–24	Football	Stanford	9–0
1937–38	Football	Alabama	13–0
1946–47	Baseball	Yale	8–7
1956–57	Baseball	Penn State	1–0
1958–59	Men's basketball	West Virginia	71–70
1968–69	Men's gymnastics	Southern Illinois	188.25–188.15
1973–74	Men's water polo	UC Irvine	8–4
1974–75	Men's gymnastics	LSU	437.325–433.7
1974–75	Men's water polo	UC Irvine	7–6
1975–76	Men's water polo	UC Irvine	9–8
1977–78	Men's water polo	UC Irvine	9–6
1978–79	Men's swimming and diving	USC	287–227
1979–80	Men's swimming and diving	Texas	234–220
1983–84	Men's water polo	USC	10–7
1984–85	Men's water polo	Stanford	9–8
1987–88	Men's water polo	USC	9–8
1988–89	Men's water polo	UCLA	14–11
1990–91	Men's water polo	Stanford	8–7
1991–92	Men's water polo	UCLA	7–6
1992–93	Men's water polo	Stanford	12–11
1996–97	Men's gymnastics	Oklahoma	233.825–232.725
1997–98	Men's gymnastics	Iowa	231.2–229.675
2001–02	Softball	Arizona	6–0
2003–04	Men's golf	UCLA	1,134–1,140
2004–05	Rowing	Virginia	67–63
2005–06	Rowing	Brown	66–66
2006–07	Men's water polo	USC	7–6
2007–08	Men's water polo	USC	8–6
2008–09	Women's swimming and diving	Georgia	411.5–400.5
2010–11	Men's swimming and diving	Texas	493–470.5
2010–11	Women's swimming and diving	Georgia	424–394.5
2011–12	Men's swimming and diving	Texas	535.5–491
2011–12	Women's swimming and diving	Georgia	412.5–366
2013–14	Men's swimming and diving	Texas	468.5–417.5
2014–15	Women's swimming and diving	Georgia	513–452
2015–16	Rowing	Ohio State	129–126
2016–17	Men's water polo	USC	11–8
2017–18	Rowing	Washington	130–128
2018–19	Men's swimming and diving	Texas	560–475
2021–22	Men's water polo	USC	13–12
2021–22	Men's swimming and diving	Texas	487.5–436.5
2022–23	Men's water polo	USC	13–12
2022–23	Men's swimming and diving	Arizona State	482–430
2023–24	Men's water polo	UCLA	13–11

Below are 72 national team titles in current and former California varsity sports that were not bestowed by the NCAA:

- Men (70)
  - Bowling (1): 1979
  - Crew (19): 1928, 1932, 1934, 1935, 1939, 1949, 1960, 1961, 1964, 1976, 1999, 2000, 2001, 2002, 2006, 2010, 2016, 2022, 2023
  - Football (5*): 1920, 1921, 1922, 1923, 1937
  - Rifle (9): 1898, 1899, 1902, 1907, 1952, 1955, 1957, 1958, 1959
  - Rugby (27): 1980, 1981, 1982, 1983, 1985, 1988, 1991, 1992, 1993, 1994, 1995, 1996, 1997, 1998, 1999, 2000, 2001, 2002, 2004, 2005, 2006, 2007, 2008, 2010, 2011, 2016, 2017
  - Rugby 7s (5) (CRC): 2013, 2014, 2015, 2016, 2017
  - Tennis (2**): 1925, 1926
  - Tennis (indoor) (2): 1980, 1989
- Women (2)
  - Crew (1): 1980
  - Tennis (indoor) (1): 2016

* Football: as determined by one contemporary and seven retrospective "major selectors" listed in the NCAA Football Bowl Subdivision Records (five of the eight selectors being math systems).
** Unofficial, by virtue of winning both the collegiate individual and doubles crowns of the U.S. Lawn Tennis Association

Below are 60 national team titles won by California club sports teams at the highest collegiate level in non-NCAA sports:

- Men (10)
  - Badminton (1^{†}): 2010
  - Hurling (1): 2013
  - Sailing (match racing) (1): 1975
  - Taekwondo (3): 1976, 1977, 1982
  - Triathlon (4^{†}): 2004, 2006, 2008, 2009
- Women (5)
  - Badminton (2^{†}): 2008, 2010
  - Sailing (dinghy) (1): 1978
  - Taekwondo (1): 1976
  - Ultimate (1): 1993
- Combined (45)
  - Archery (2): mixed recurve – 2016; mixed barebow – 2016
  - Badminton (5^{†}): 2000, 2009, 2013, 2015, 2019
  - Cycling (road) (3^{‡}): 2002, 2003, 2004
  - Taekwondo (28): 1986, 1990, 1991, 1992, 1993, 1994, 1995, 1996, 1997, 1998, 1999, 2000, 2001, 2002, 2004, 2005, 2006, 2007, 2008, 2009, 2010, 2011, 2012, 2014, 2015, 2016, 2017, 2018 (tie)
  - Team Tennis (WTT format) (4): 2010, 2012, 2014, 2015
  - Triathlon (3^{†}): combined – 2008; team relay – 2012, 2014

^{†} For this sport, some years may be missing from this list and hence remain uncounted.
^{‡} Cal also won the individual women's title at the 2002 intercollegiate cyclo-cross championship held in Yountville, California, and hosted by Cal. In addition, Cal men finished in places 2, 7, 9 and 15. It is unclear whether a team champion was declared. If so, Cal would have won the title.

=== Individual ===
As of March 25, 2023, California Golden Bears have won 290 all-time individual championships, including doubles, rowing crews and relay events, in sports currently governed at the Division I level by the NCAA. The eight men's tennis titles won before 1946 were bestowed by the U.S. Lawn Tennis Association. The four women's tennis titles won in 1929–1931 were bestowed at the National Collegiate Girls' Tennis Championships. The four women's rowing titles won in the 1980s were bestowed by the National Women's Rowing Association. The names of the nine women who won the 1984 women's novice eights rowing title have not been retrieved.

NCAA individual championships^{*}
Order	School year	Athlete(s)	Sport	Source
1	1921–22	Jack Merchant	Men's outdoor track and field	
2	1921–22	Jack Merchant	Men's outdoor track and field	
3	1921–22	Allen Norris	Men's outdoor track and field	
4	1924–25	Gervais Hills; Gerald Stratford	Men's tennis	
5	1924–25	Edward Chandler	Men's tennis	
6	1924–25	Oather Hampton	Men's outdoor track and field	
7	1925–26	Edward Chandler	Men's tennis	
8	1925–26	Edward Chandler; Tom Stow	Men's tennis	
	1928–29	Josephine Cruickshank	Women's tennis doubles	
	1929–30	Josephine Cruickshank	Women's tennis singles	
	1929–30	Josephine Cruickshank	Women's tennis doubles	
9	1929–30	Dolf Muehelisen; Robert Muench	Men's tennis	
10	1929–30	Kenny Churchill	Men's outdoor track and field	
11	1930–31	Kenny Churchill	Men's outdoor track and field	
	1930–31	Charlotte Miller	Women's tennis doubles	
12	1934–35	Richard Bennett; Paul Newton	Men's tennis	
13	1935–36	Archie Williams	Men's outdoor track and field	
14	1936–37	Richard Bennett; Paul Newton	Men's tennis	
15	1938–39	Douglas Imhoff; Robert Peacock	Men's tennis	
16	1939–40	Martin Biles	Men's outdoor track and field	
17	1940–41	Martin Biles	Men's outdoor track and field	
18	1940–41	Guinn Smith	Men's outdoor track and field	
19	1941–42	Robert Biles	Men's outdoor track and field	
20	1941–42	Hal Davis	Men's outdoor track and field	
21	1941–42	Hal Davis	Men's outdoor track and field	
22	1942–43	Hal Davis	Men's outdoor track and field	
23	1942–43	Hal Davis	Men's outdoor track and field	
24	1947–48	Charlie Thompson	Men's gymnastics	
25	1948–49	Charlie Thompson	Men's gymnastics	
26	1951–52	Clifton Mayne; Hugh Ditzler	Men's tennis	
27	1951–52	Bentley Lyon	Wrestling	
28	1951–52	George Roseme	Men's outdoor track and field	
29	1953–54	Lawrence Anderson	Men's outdoor track and field	
30	1956–57	Don Bowden	Men's outdoor track and field	
31	1958–59	Art Shurlock	Men's gymnastics	
32	1959–60	James Fairchild	Men's gymnastics	
33	1960–61	Paul Davis	Men's gymnastics	
34	1960–61	James Fairchild	Men's gymnastics	
35	1961–62	Paul Davis	Men's gymnastics	
36	1961–62	Roger Olson	Men's outdoor track and field	
37	1963–64	Al Courchesne; Dave Fishback; Forrest Beaty; Dave Archibald	Men's outdoor track and field	
38	1964–65	Chuck Glenn; Dave Fishback; Forrest Beaty; Dave Archibald	Men's outdoor track and field	
39	1964–65	Dan Millman	Men's gymnastics	
40	1966–67	Josh Robinson	Men's gymnastics	
41	1967–68	Sidney Freudenstein	Men's gymnastics	
42	1968–69	Dan Bowels	Men's gymnastics	
43	1969–70	Eddie Hart	Men's outdoor track and field	
44	1974–75	Tom Beach	Men's gymnastics	
45	1975–76	Tom Beach	Men's gymnastics	
46	1975–76	Ed Miller	Men's outdoor track and field	
47	1976–77	Graham Smith	Men's swimming and diving	
48	1976–77	Graham Smith	Men's swimming and diving	
49	1977–78	Peter Rocca; Graham Smith; Pär Arvidsson; Jim Fairbank	Men's swimming and diving	
50	1977–78	Peter Rocca	Men's swimming and diving	
51	1977–78	Graham Smith	Men's swimming and diving	
52	1978–79	Peter Rocca; Graham Smith; Pär Arvidsson; Per Holmertz	Men's swimming and diving	
53	1978–79	Pär Arvidsson	Men's swimming and diving	
54	1978–79	Pär Arvidsson	Men's swimming and diving	
55	1978–79	Peter Rocca	Men's swimming and diving	
56	1978–79	Graham Smith	Men's swimming and diving	
57	1978–79	Graham Smith	Men's swimming and diving	
58	1978–79	Graham Smith	Men's swimming and diving	
59	1979–80	Pär Arvidsson	Men's swimming and diving	
60	1979–80	Pär Arvidsson	Men's swimming and diving	
	1979–80	Katie Stone; Renee Russak; Joy Stockton; Leanne Cox; Barb O'Neill; Nancy Denison; Kathy Moeller; Alice Lee; Nan Bernadou (cox)	Women's rowing varsity eight	
	1979–80	Connie Carpenter; Signe Wallen; Jennifer Scott; Pauline Velez; Robin Kneeland (cox)	Women's rowing varsity four	
	1980–81	Signe Wallen; Jennifer Scott; Pauline Velez two unknown others	Women's rowing varsity four	
61	1980–81	Mark Bergman	Men's gymnastics	
62	1980–81	Larry Cowling	Men's outdoor track and field	
63	1981–82	Paolo Revelli; P.A. Magnusson; Todd Trowbridge; Per Holmertz	Men's swimming and diving	
64	1981–82	Per Holmertz	Men's swimming and diving	
65	1981–82	Randall Wickstrom	Men's gymnastics	
66	1982–83	Mary Meagher	Women's swimming and diving	
	1983–84	nine unknown women	Women's rowing novice eight	
67	1984–85	Thomas Lejdström; Michael Söderlund; Bengt Baron; Matt Biondi	Men's swimming and diving	
68	1984–85	Michael Söderland; Thomas Lejdström; Bengt Baron; Matt Biondi	Men's swimming and diving	
69	1984–85	Conny van Bentum	Women's swimming and diving	
70	1984–85	Matt Biondi	Men's swimming and diving	
71	1984–85	Matt Biondi	Men's swimming and diving	
72	1984–85	Mary Meagher	Women's swimming and diving	
73	1984–85	Mary Meagher	Women's swimming and diving	
74	1985–86	Tommy Werner; Thomas Lejdström; Michael Söderlund; Matt Biondi	Men's swimming and diving	
75	1985–86	Tommy Werner; Thomas Lejdström; Michael Söderland; Matt Biondi	Men's swimming and diving	
76	1985–86	Matt Biondi	Men's swimming and diving	
77	1985–86	Matt Biondi	Men's swimming and diving	
78	1985–86	Matt Biondi	Men's swimming and diving	
79	1985–86	Mary Meagher	Women's swimming and diving	
80	1985–86	Conny van Bentum	Women's swimming and diving	
81	1986–87	Tommy Werner; Joel Thomas; Terry DeBiase; Matt Biondi	Men's swimming and diving	
82	1986–87	Matt Biondi	Men's swimming and diving	
83	1986–87	Matt Biondi	Men's swimming and diving	
84	1986–87	Matt Biondi	Men's swimming and diving	
85	1986–87	Sheila Hudson	Women's outdoor track and field	
86	1986–87	Mary Meagher	Women's swimming and diving	
87	1986–87	Mary Meagher	Women's swimming and diving	
88	1987–88	Sheila Hudson	Women's outdoor track and field	
89	1987–88	Hiroko Nagasaki	Women's swimming and diving	
90	1987–88	Kari Nisula	Men's outdoor track and field	
91	1989–90	Sheila Hudson	Women's indoor track and field	
92	1989–90	Sheila Hudson	Women's indoor track and field	
93	1989–90	Doug Eisenman; Matt Lucena	Men's tennis	
94	1989–90	Sheila Hudson	Women's outdoor track and field	
95	1989–90	Sheila Hudson	Women's outdoor track and field	
96	1990–91	Matt Lucena; Bent-Ove Pedersen	Men's tennis	
97	1992–93	Chris Huffins	Men's outdoor track and field	
98	1993–94	Jason Bertram	Men's gymnastics	
99	1993–94	Uğur Taner	Men's swimming and diving	
100	1994–95	Uğur Taner	Men's swimming and diving	
101	1995–96	Uğur Taner	Men's swimming and diving	
102	1997-98	Amanda Augustus; Amy Jensen	Women's tennis	
103	1997–98	Josh Birckelbaw	Men's gymnastics	
104	1998-99	Amanda Augustus; Amy Jensen	Women's tennis	
105	1998–99	Marylyn Chiang	Women's swimming and diving	
106	1998–99	Bartosz Kizierowski	Men's swimming and diving	
107	1999–00	Matthew Macedo; Anthony Ervin; Bartosz Kizierowski; Lars Merseburg	Men's swimming and diving	
108	1999–00	Anya Kolbisen; Haley Cope; Nicole Omphroy; Joscelin Yeo	Women's swimming and diving	
109	1999–00	Haley Cope; Staciana Stitts; Waen Minapraphal; Joscelin Yeo	Women's swimming and diving	
110	1999–00	Claire Curran; Amy Jensen	Women's tennis	
111	1999–00	Michael Ashe	Men's gymnastics	
112	1999–00	Anthony Ervin	Men's swimming and diving	
113	1999–00	Anthony Ervin	Men's swimming and diving	
114	1999–00	Bevan Hart	Men's outdoor track and field	
115	2000–01	Michael Ashe	Men's gymnastics	
116	2000–01	Natalie Coughlin	Women's swimming and diving	
117	2000–01	Natalie Coughlin	Women's swimming and diving	
118	2000–01	Natalie Coughlin	Women's swimming and diving	
119	2000–01	Anthony Ervin	Men's swimming and diving	
120	2001–02	Duje Draganja; Anthony Ervin; Matthew Macedo; Mattias Ohlin	Men's swimming and diving	
121	2001–02	Natalie Coughlin	Women's swimming and diving	
122	2001–02	Natalie Coughlin	Women's swimming and diving	
123	2001–02	Natalie Coughlin	Women's swimming and diving	
124	2001–02	Anthony Ervin	Men's swimming and diving	
125	2001–02	Cody Moore	Men's gymnastics	
126	2002–03	Duje Draganja; Milorad Čavić; Joe Bruckart; Anthony Ervin	Men's swimming and diving	
127	2002–03	Christina Fusano; Raquel Atawo	Women's tennis	
128	2002–03	Natalie Coughlin	Women's swimming and diving	
129	2002–03	Natalie Coughlin	Women's swimming and diving	
130	2002–03	Natalie Coughlin	Women's swimming and diving	
131	2002–03	Duje Draganja	Men's swimming and diving	
132	2003–04	Natalie Coughlin; Erin Reilly; Ashley Chandler; Lauren Medina	Women's swimming and diving	
133	2003–04	Graham Ackerman	Men's gymnastics	
134	2003–04	Graham Ackerman	Men's gymnastics	
135	2003–04	Natalie Coughlin	Women's swimming and diving	
136	2003–04	Natalie Coughlin	Women's swimming and diving	
137	2003–04	Sarah Huarte	Women's golf	
138	2004–05	Erin Cafaro; Mara Allen; Erin Reinhardt; Iva Obradović; Kim Atkinson; Laura Terheyden; Kaylan Vander; Jelena Djukic; Remy Hitomi	Rowing	
139	2004–05	Duje Draganja; Rolandas Gimbutis; Jonas Tilly; Milorad Čavić	Men's swimming and diving	
140	2004–05	Duje Draganja; Milorad Čavić; Jonas Tilly; Rolandas Gimbutis	Men's swimming and diving	
141	2004–05	Milorad Čavić; Henrique Barbosa; Duje Draganja; Rolandas Gimbutis	Men's swimming and diving	
142	2004–05	Graham Ackerman	Men's gymnastics	
143	2004–05	Duje Draganja	Men's swimming and diving	
144	2004–05	Duje Draganja	Men's swimming and diving	
145	2005–06	Suzi Babos	Women's tennis	
146	2005–06	Henrique Barbosa	Men's swimming and diving	
147	2005–06	Henrique Barbosa	Men's swimming and diving	
148	2005–06	Jessica Hardy	Women's swimming and diving	
149	2005–06	Tim McNeill	Men's gymnastics	
150	2005–06	Helen Silver	Women's swimming and diving	
151	2006–07	Emily Silver; Erin Reilly; Jessica Hardy; Dana Vollmer	Women's swimming and diving	
152	2006–07	Dana Vollmer; Emily Silver; Blake Hayter; Erin Reilly	Women's swimming and diving	
153	2006–07	Lauren Rogers; Jessica Hardy; Dana Vollmer; Emily Silver	Women's swimming and diving	
154	2006–07	Kelechi Anyanwu	Women's outdoor track and field	
155	2006–07	Jessica Hardy	Women's swimming and diving	
156	2006–07	Alysia Montaño	Women's indoor track and field	
157	2006–07	Alysia Montaño	Women's outdoor track and field	
158	2006–07	Tim McNeill	Men's gymnastics	
159	2006–07	Tim McNeill	Men's gymnastics	
160	2006–07	Patrick O'Neil	Men's swimming and diving	
161	2006–07	Dana Vollmer	Women's swimming and diving	
162	2007–08	Tim McNeill	Men's gymnastics	
163	2007–08	Tim McNeill	Men's gymnastics	
164	2007–08	Katie Morgan	Women's outdoor track and field	
165	2008–09	Hannah Wilson; Liv Jensen; Erica Dagg; Dana Vollmer	Women's swimming and diving	
166	2008–09	Sara Isaković; Hannah Wilson; Liv Jensen; Dana Vollmer	Women's swimming and diving	
167	2008–09	Mari Andersson; Jana Juricová	Women's tennis	
168	2008–09	Nathan Adrian	Men's swimming and diving	
169	2008–09	Nathan Adrian	Men's swimming and diving	
170	2008–09	Damir Dugonjič	Men's swimming and diving	
171	2008–09	Martin Marić	Men's outdoor track and field	
172	2008–09	Evan Roth	Men's gymnastics	
173	2008–09	Amanda Sims	Women's swimming and diving	
174	2008–09	Dana Vollmer	Women's swimming and diving	
175	2008–09	Dana Vollmer	Women's swimming and diving	
176	2009–10	Nathan Adrian; Graeme Moore; Joshua Daniels; Guy Barnea	Men's swimming and diving	
177	2009–10	Graeme Moore; Joshua Daniels; Tom Shields; Nathan Adrian	Men's swimming and diving	
178	2009–10	Guy Barnea; Damir Dugonjič; Graeme Moore; Joshua Daniels	Men's swimming and diving	
179	2009–10	Guy Barnea; Damir Dugonjič; Tom Shields; Nathan Thomas	Men's swimming and diving	
180	2009–10	Nathan Adrian	Men's swimming and diving	
181	2009–10	Damir Dugonjič	Men's swimming and diving	
182	2009–10	Liv Jensen	Women's swimming and diving	
183	2009–10	Tom Shields	Men's swimming and diving	
184	2010–11	Becca Lindquist; Kyndal Mancho; Charlotte Palmer; Catherine Shannon; Lynn Anderson	Rowing	
185	2010–11	Graeme Moore; Joshua Daniels; Tom Shields; Nathan Adrian	Men's swimming and diving	
186	2010–11	Guy Barnea; Damir Dugonjič; Graeme Moore; Nathan Adrian	Men's swimming and diving	
187	2010–11	Guy Barnea; Damir Dugonjič; Tom Shields; Nathan Adrian	Men's swimming and diving	
188	2010–11	Hannah Wilson; Colleen Fotsch; Erica Dagg; Liv Jensen	Women's swimming and diving	
189	2010–11	Cindy Tran; Caitlin Leverenz; Colleen Fotsch; Liv Jensen	Women's swimming and diving	
190	2010–11	Cindy Tran; Caitlin Leverenz; Amanda Sims; Liv Jensen	Women's swimming and diving	
191	2010–11	Nathan Adrian	Men's swimming and diving	
192	2010–11	Nathan Adrian	Men's swimming and diving	
193	2010–11	Damir Dugonjič	Men's swimming and diving	
194	2010–11	Jana Juricová	Women's tennis	
195	2010–11	Michael Morrison	Men's outdoor track and field	
196	2010–11	Tom Shields	Men's swimming and diving	
197	2010–11	Amanda Sims	Women's swimming and diving	
198	2010–11	Cindy Tran	Women's swimming and diving	
199	2011–12	Tyler Messerschmidt; Shayne Fleming; Fabio Gimondi; Seth Stubblefield	Men's swimming and diving	
200	2011–12	Mathias Gydesen; Nolan Koon; Tom Shields; Tyler Messerschmidt	Men's swimming and diving	
201	2011–12	Cindy Tran; Caitlin Leverenz; Colleen Fotsch; Liv Jensen	Women's swimming and diving	
202	2011–12	Cindy Tran; Caitlin Leverenz; Sara Isaković; Katherine Raatz	Women's swimming and diving	
203	2011–12	Will Hamilton	Men's swimming and diving	
204	2011–12	Glen Ishino	Men's gymnastics	
205	2011–12	Sara Isaković	Women's swimming and diving	
206	2011–12	Liv Jensen	Women's swimming and diving	
207	2011–12	Caitlin Leverenz	Women's swimming and diving	
208	2011–12	Caitlin Leverenz	Women's swimming and diving	
209	2011–12	Tom Shields	Men's swimming and diving	
210	2011–12	Tom Shields	Men's swimming and diving	
211	2011–12	Marcin Tarczyński	Men's swimming and diving	
212	2011–12	Cindy Tran	Women's swimming and diving	
213	2012–13	Aggie Nowinski; Erica Rippe; Paparangi Hipango; Kara Kohler; Jenn Helssen; Kendall Chase; Maggie Simpson; Clair Premzic; Rachel Ersted	Rowing	
214	2012–13	Rachel Bootsma	Women's swimming and diving	
215	2012–13	Max Homa	Men's golf	
216	2012–13	Caitlin Leverenz	Women's swimming and diving	
217	2012–13	Elizabeth Pelton	Women's swimming and diving	
218	2012–13	Tom Shields	Men's swimming and diving	
219	2012–13	Tom Shields	Men's swimming and diving	
220	2013–14	Dorothee Beckendorff; Stephanie Kraemer; Charlotte Passot; Anne Duval; Mary Thomasmyer	Rowing	
221	2013–14	Tyler Messerschmidt; Ryan Murphy; Tony Cox; Seth Stubblefield	Men's swimming and diving	
222	2013–14	Ryan Murphy; Chuck Katis; Tony Cox; Tyler Messerschmidt	Men's swimming and diving	
223	2013–14	Rachael Acker; Caroline Piehl; Elizabeth Pelton; Missy Franklin	Women's swimming and diving	
224	2013–14	Ryan Murphy; Chuck Katis; Marcin Tarczyński; Seth Stubblefield	Men's swimming and diving	
225	2013–14	Missy Franklin	Women's swimming and diving	
226	2013–14	Ryan Murphy	Men's swimming and diving	
227	2013–14	Ryan Murphy	Men's swimming and diving	
228	2014–15	Ryan Murphy; Chuck Katis; Justin Lynch; Tyler Messerschmidt	Men's swimming and diving	
229	2014–15	Kaylin Bing; Missy Franklin; Rachel Bootsma; Farida Osman	Women's swimming and diving	
230	2014–15	Cierra Runge; Camille Cheng; Elizabeth Pelton; Missy Franklin	Women's swimming and diving	
231	2014–15	Rachel Bootsma; Marina García; Noemie Thomas; Farida Osman	Women's swimming and diving	
232	2014–15	Rachel Bootsma	Women's swimming and diving	
233	2014–15	Missy Franklin	Women's swimming and diving	
234	2014–15	Missy Franklin	Women's swimming and diving	
235	2014–15	Missy Franklin	Women's swimming and diving	
236	2014–15	Ryan Murphy	Men's swimming and diving	
237	2014–15	Ryan Murphy	Men's swimming and diving	
238	2015–16	Francis Wood; Kendall Ritter; Hunter Deuel; Eleanor Howe; Riley Brown	Rowing	
239	2015–16	Sarah Schwartz; Katherine Kelly; Charlotte Passot; Ellen Heile; Dana Moffat; Sydney Payne; Roisin Duffy; Charlotte Wesselmann; Rachel Lether	Rowing	
240	2015–16	Farida Osman; Kristen Vredeveld; Valarie Hull; Amy Bilquist	Women's swimming and diving	
241	2015–16	Rachel Bootsma	Women's swimming and diving	
242	2015–16	Ryan Murphy	Men's swimming and diving	
243	2015–16	Ryan Murphy	Men's swimming and diving	
244	2015–16	Josh Prenot	Men's swimming and diving	
245	2016–17	Abbey Weitzeil; Maddie Murphy; Amy Bilquist; Farida Osman	Women's swimming and diving	
246	2016–17	Kathleen Baker; Abbey Weitzeil; Noemie Thomas; Farida Osman	Women's swimming and diving	
247	2016–17	Kathleen Baker	Women's swimming and diving	
248	2016–17	Kathleen Baker	Women's swimming and diving	
249	2016–17	Kathleen Baker	Women's swimming and diving	
250	2016–17	Ryan Murphy	Men's swimming and diving	
251	2016–17	Ryan Murphy	Men's swimming and diving	
252	2016–17	Farida Osman	Women's swimming and diving	
253	2017–18	Hannah Christopher; Charlotte Wesselmann; Mia Croonquist; Juliane Faralisch; Dana Moffat; Chloe Betts; Maddison Brown; Sydney Payne; Bea Bliemel	Rowing	
254	2017–18	Riley Brown; Alex Floyd; Ellen Heile; Katie De Haas; Zoe Feist	Rowing	
255	2017–18	Kathleen Baker	Women's swimming and diving	

^{*} Including pre-NCAA men's and women's tennis and women's rowing

== Notable club sports ==
=== Ice hockey ===
California Ice Hockey Team is an ACHA Division II program, competing in the Pacific 8 Intercollegiate Hockey Conference. The team is coached by Devin Cox, who took over as head coach in 2023.

=== Volleyball ===
The University of California department of athletics sponsors a varsity women's volleyball program without a men's equivalent program at the NCAA/varsity level; therefore, California only competes in intercollegiate men's volleyball at the club level. Along with the men's club volleyball program, there is also a women's club team separate from the women's varsity team. According to the UC Berkeley Recreational Sports page, the club men's volleyball program has won a total of six national championships. Occasionally, members of the club volleyball team will help the women's varsity volleyball team with practices and open scrimmages.

=== Taekwondo ===
The California taekwondo team has won 32 national team championships from 1976 through 2018 (includes 3 men's and one women's team titles prior to the adoption of overall scoring).

== Athletic facilities ==
=== California Memorial Stadium ===
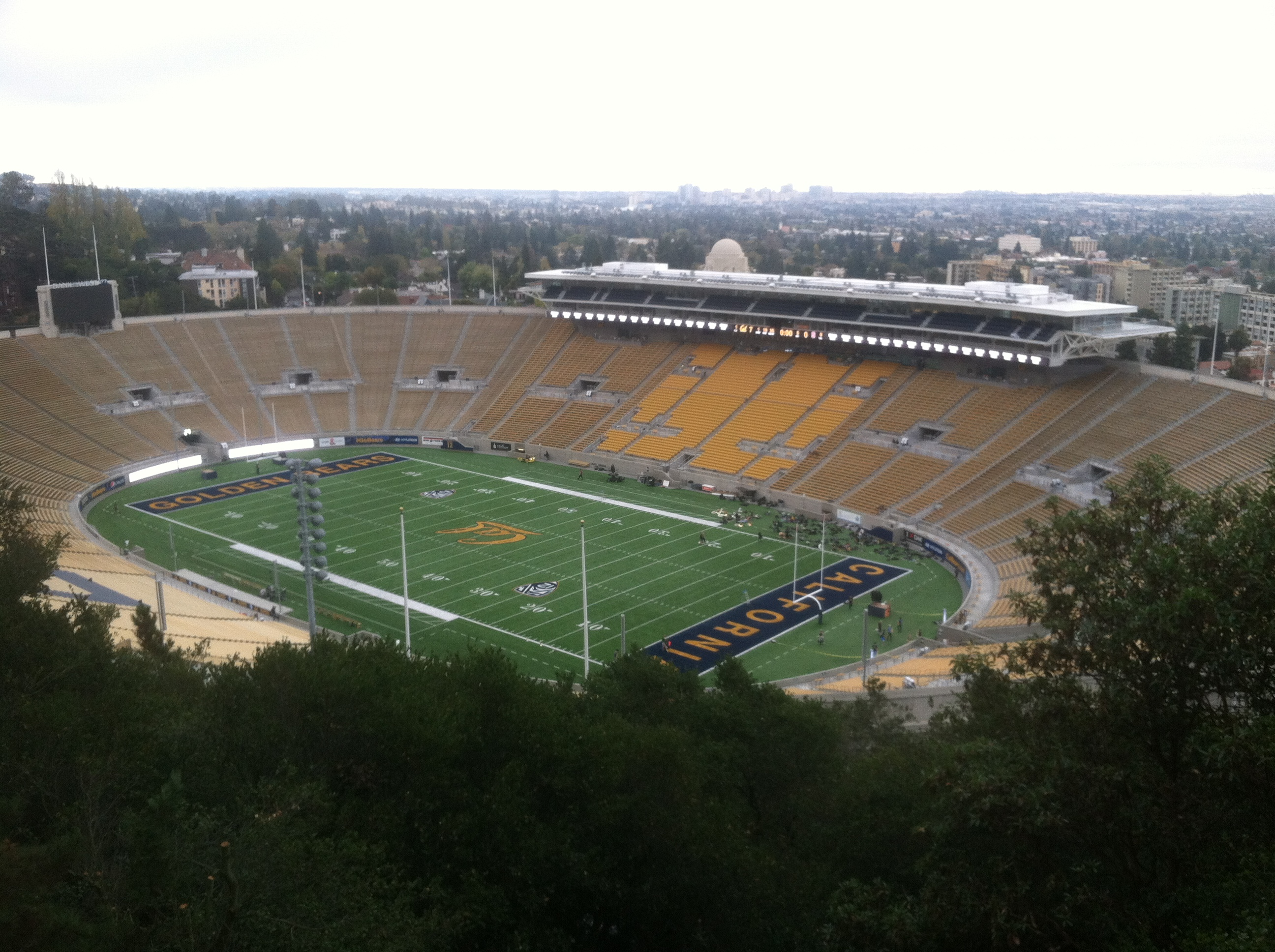
California Memorial Stadium in 2012

California Memorial Stadium is the home field for California's football program. The venue opened in 1923 and seated between 72,000 and 80,000 fans until the 2010 football season (its final configuration before the renovation seated 71,799), making it northern California's largest football stadium in terms of seating capacity; however, the stadium's capacity dropped to 62,467 seats after the renovation was completed.

==== Simpson Center ====
The Simpson Center (known as the Student Athlete High Performance Center or SAHPC during construction) is the new high-performance center for California's student athletes, located right next to California Memorial Stadium on Piedmont Avenue. The new center opened in the fall of 2011 and by January 2012, the final team (football) had moved into the facility. The Simpson Center is home to 13 of California's 32 intercollegiate athletic programs, including football, Men's Rugby, Women's Lacrosse, Men's and Women's Gymnastics, Men's and Women's Golf, Men's and Women's Soccer, Men's and Women's Crew, Women's Field Hockey, and softball. According to the University of California, the facility is a 142,000-square-foot (13,200 m^{2}) complex that will provide "year round access for over 450 student athletes."

=== Haas Pavilion ===
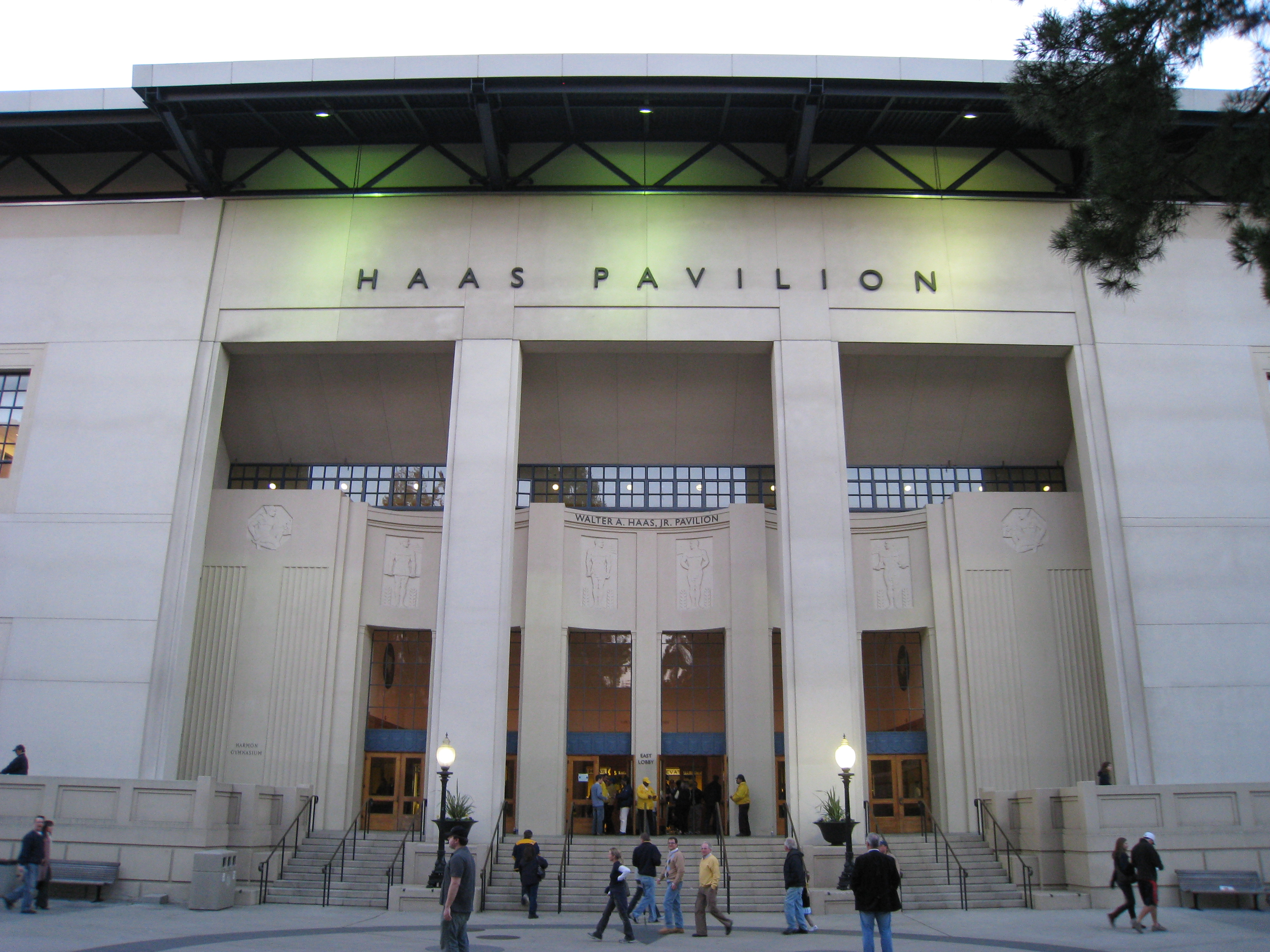
Exterior of Haas Pavilion.

Walter A. Haas, Jr. Pavilion is the home of California's men's and women's basketball, women's volleyball, and men's and women's gymnastics teams. The arena is located in the middle of the main University of California sports complex, overlooking Evans Diamond (baseball) and Edwards Stadium (track/soccer). The arena was originally constructed in 1933 as the Men's Gym. It was renamed, in 1959, Harmon Gym after Oakland financier A.K.P. Harmon, who in 1879 donated the funds to build Cal's first indoor athletic facility. The playing surface, after being known as simply "Room 100" when the arena opened, was renamed Pete Newell Court in 1987 in honor of Pete Newell, who led Cal to the national championship in 1959. Proposals for replacing the old gym were bandied about from the 1970s onward, but sentiment was strongly in favor of its reconstruction. As a result, the arena was heavily renovated from 1997 to 1999 after a donation of about $11 million from Walter A. Haas, Jr. of Levi Strauss & Co., constructing a new seating bowl within the existing walls.

==== Recreational Sports Facility ====
The Recreational Sports Facility is a 100,000 square foot athletics center that is attached to Haas Pavilion and is located on Bancroft Avenue. The RSF features many different rooms for many different activities including, but not limited to: basketball, weight lifting, racquetball, handball, squash, volleyball, and badminton. Attached to the facility is the RSF Field House which is home to many of California's club and intramural teams and has, in the past, hosted the Cal women's volleyball team while Haas Pavilion was under construction. Also attached to the RSF is the Spieker Aquatics Complex, which is home to the California men's and women's water polo and men's and women's swimming and diving programs.

=== Evans Diamond ===
Evans Diamond is California's baseball stadium, it opened in 1933 and currently has a seating capacity of 2,500. Evans Diamond is located in the UC sports complex in the southwest corner of campus, pressed between Edwards Stadium to the west (right field) and Haas Pavilion to the east. Originally named Edwards Field, it was renamed after Clint Evans, the Cal head coach from 1930 to 1954. The stadium was renovated in 1992 at a cost of $275,000, paid for by the donations of UC alumni. Construction was done by RNT Landscaping, a San Leandro landscaping company. The stadium is considered inadequate to host regional and super regional games for the NCAA tournament because of its lack of lights.

=== Other facilities ===
- Oakland Arena (Men's Basketball 1997-1999)
- Clark Kerr Sand Courts (Beach volleyball)
- Edwards Stadium (Soccer, Track & Field)
- Hellman Tennis Complex (Tennis)
- Legends Aquatics Center (Swimming and Diving, Water Polo)
- Levine-Fricke Field (Softball)
- Spieker Aquatics Complex (Water Polo, Swimming & Diving)
- T. Gary Rogers Rowing Center (Crew)
- Underhill Field (Field Hockey)
- Witter Rugby Field (Rugby)

== California spirit ==
=== School colors and mascot ===
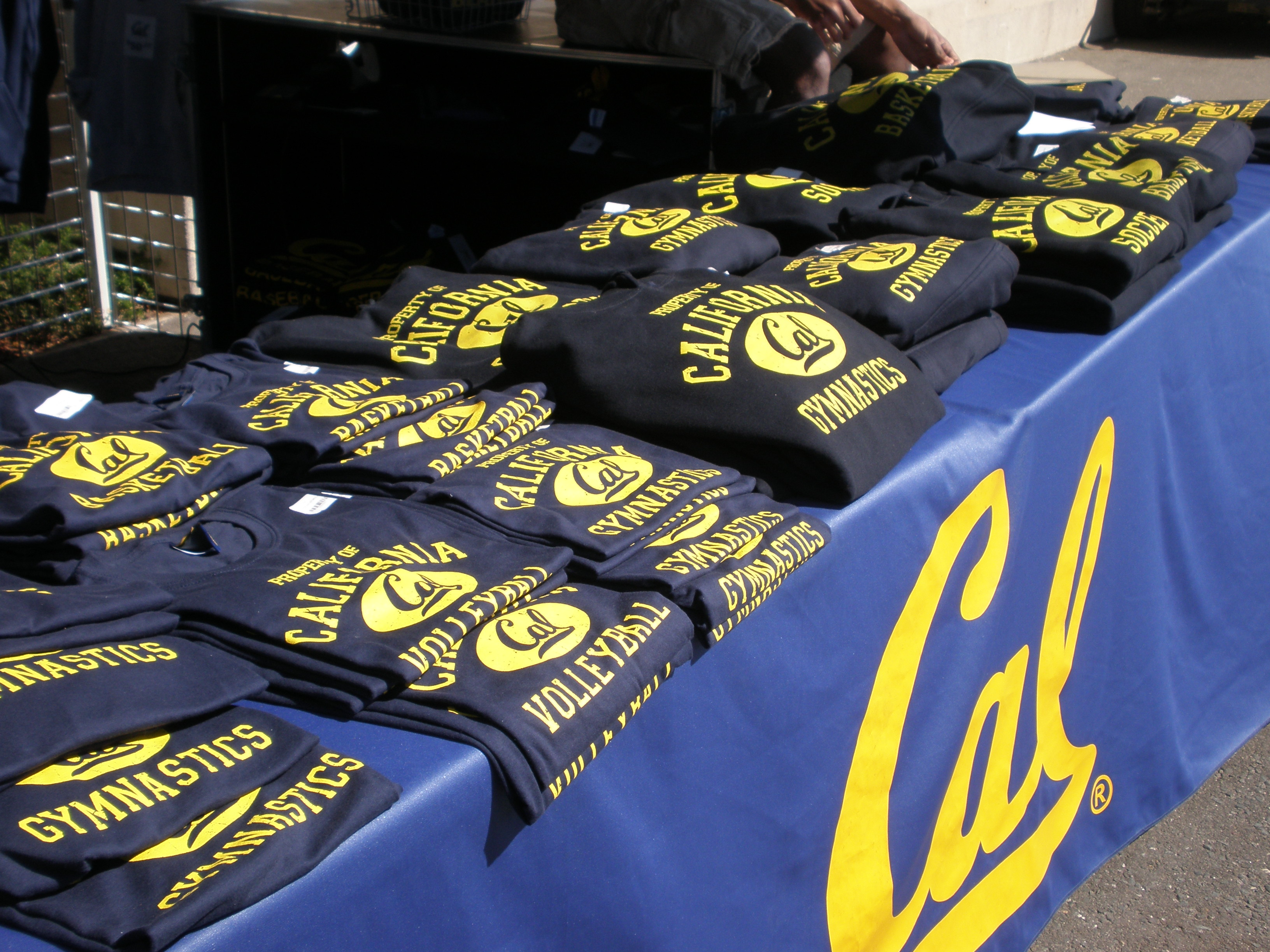
Various athletic shirts in the blue and gold colors

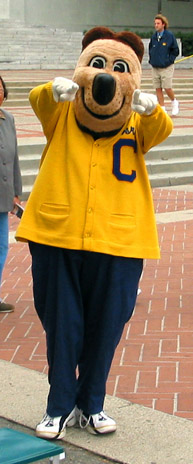
Oski, the mascot of the University of California

Blue and gold have been Cal's official colors since 1875. The dark blue represents California's sky and ocean, and Yale University, the alma mater of several of the university's founders, including its first president, Henry Durant. Gold is a reference to the state of California's nickname, the "Golden State." The shade of gold varies from a more metallic gold on the university seal, and a yellow-gold (also known as California Gold) that is in use by the athletic department. Because of the university's use of blue and gold, the state of California's de facto colors were blue and gold from around 1913 to 1951 and became the official state colors in 1951.

Since 1895, the athletic teams of the University of California have officially been known as the "California Golden Bears."

=== University of California Marching Band ===
The University of California Marching Band, usually shortened to Cal Band, is the marching band for the University of California, Berkeley. While the Cal Band is student-run, it is administered under the auspices of the university and represents Cal at sporting events and social gatherings. The name of the band is "The University of California Band" by the constitution, but is typically called "The University of California Marching Band" or "The Cal Band". When the band marches out of Memorial Stadium's North Tunnel for football pre-games, it is referred to as "The Pacesetter of College Marching Bands, the Pride of California". When in attendance at basketball games or other small sporting events, a smaller subset known as the "Straw Hat Band" represents the UC Marching Band.

==== Songs ====
Fight for California
Primary fight song

=== University of California Rally Committee ===
The University of California Rally Committee, usually shortened to Rally Comm, is the official guardian of the University of California's spirit and traditions. The committee is in charge of the protection of the Stanford Axe (while Cal is in possession of it), the Bonfire Rally, the Cal flags, the California Victory Cannon, Homecoming Rally, the upkeep of the Big C, and many other spirit related activities. Rally Comm is completely student-run and can be found at almost every major sporting event and many other events throughout the Bay Area and country. The most distinguishing feature of the University of California Rally Committee are the blue and gold striped rugby shirts that serve as the official uniform of the committee.

=== The Bench ===
The Bench is the student cheering section for the University of California men's basketball team. Located inside Haas Pavilion, The Bench holds up to 900 students who cheer on their California Golden Bears at home basketball games. Students who sit on The Bench receive an annual Bench T-shirt each year and continue to make Haas Pavilion one of the loudest basketball arenas in the Pac-12 Conference. The Bench prides itself on standing the entire game and ensuring that the arena is a hostile place for any opposing team to play.

Although exact dates are not known, the tradition of The Bench was drastically changed in October 2000 when renovations on Haas Pavilion were completed and put a row of portable chairs between the student section and the court. University officials called the move necessary for the protection of referees and players, but students were angry at the move because it further removed them from the action.

=== Calgorithm ===
During the 2024 college football season, Cal's online fanbase drew national attention for its unique and self-deprecating usage of memes on the website X (formerly Twitter). Known as the Calgorithm (coined by Jessica Smetana), the movement rose to prominence when Cal fan and graduate student Miles Goodman posted a meme directed at Auburn's official account after Cal's upset win, declaring "You Just Lost To The Woke Agenda". The image featured a picture of former Cal quarterback Fernando Mendoza alongside Kamala Harris, Joe Biden, Cal's mascot Oski, a rainbow, and an electoral map of the United States showing a landslide victory for the Democratic Party. The post has received over 5 million views. The humor largely played on the stereotype of Berkeley students as left-leaning. Other posts referenced DEI and Critical race theory. A group of fans also created a parody of Chappell Roan's song "Hot to Go!" entitled "Ott to Go." The increased interest was cited as a contributing factor in College GameDay visiting Cal for the first time on October 5.

== Stanford rivalry ==
California shares a traditional sports and academic rivalry with nearby Stanford University. Both schools operate in the San Francisco Bay Area with the University of California in the East Bay and Stanford in Santa Clara County. While the schools have a rich athletic rivalry with the football programs meeting 126 times, they also share an academic rivalry: the University of California, Berkeley, is commonly considered one of the best public university nationally while Stanford University is thought of as being one of the best private universities in the country. Athletic events between the two schools are usually signified by being the "Big whatever", examples include: the Big Game (football), Big Tip Off (basketball), Big Spike (Volleyball), Big Splash (Water Polo), Big Meet (Track & Field), Big Freeze (Club Ice Hockey), et cetera. Women's basketball does not follow the normal naming template for games between the two schools and is simply known as "The Battle of the Bay."

The annual football game features both teams vying for the Stanford Axe.

== Trophies ==
=== Stanford Axe ===
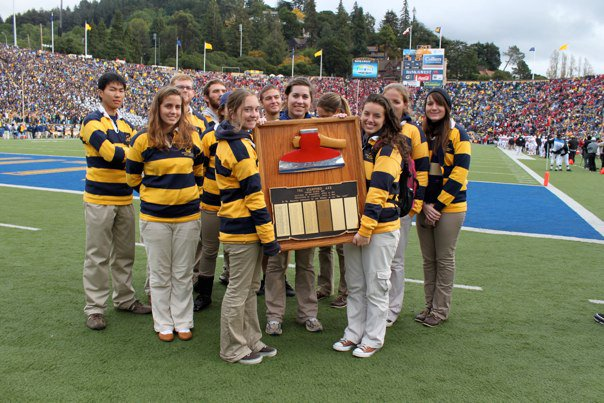
The University of California Rally Committee in possession of the Stanford Axe

The Stanford Axe is a trophy awarded to the winner of the annual Big Game, a college football match-up between the University of California Golden Bears and the Stanford University Cardinal. The trophy consists of an axe-head mounted on a large wooden plaque, along with the scores of past Big Games. California is currently in possession of the Axe after winning the 2024 Big Game in Berkeley.

Years California has been in possession of the Axe:
72 years total: 31 years pre-trophy, 40 years as the Big Game Trophy (2 ties)
1899–1930, 1936, 1937, 1938, 1939, 1941, 1947, 1948, 1949, 1950*, 1951, 1952, 1953*, 1954, 1956, 1958, 1959, 1960, 1967, 1970,
1972, 1975, 1979, 1980, 1982, 1983, 1986, 1993, 1994, 2002, 2003, 2004, 2005, 2006, 2008, 2009, 2019, 2021, 2022, 2023, 2024
*In 1950, and 1953, the Big Game ended in a tie. Because California was already in possession of the Axe, it remained in Berkeley.

=== World Cup ===
The World Cup is awarded to the winner of the annual rugby union series between the University of California Golden Bears and the University of British Columbia Thunderbirds. In rugby, California's traditional rival is British Columbia, not Stanford, which led to the creation of the World Cup. California was the 2013 World Cup winner, defeating UBC 28–18 in Berkeley on February 16, 2013, and 38–6 in Vancouver on March 24, 2013.

=== Scrum Axe ===
Although California's main rival in rugby is British Columbia, the rivalry between California and Stanford in rugby has been going on for more than a century. The trophy awarded to the winner of the California-Stanford rugby match is known as the "Scrum Axe", which is a play on the "Stanford Axe", the trophy awarded to whichever school wins the annual rugby contest. California retained its hold on the Scrum Axe on January 26, 2013, in Berkeley, winning their 17th straight meeting over the Cardinal 176–0.

== Olympic representation ==
Throughout the years, the University of California has been well represented in the Summer Olympic games with Cal athletes winning 90 gold medals, 40 silver medals, and 28 bronze medals. Despite the fact that the university sponsors no sports that compete in the Winter Olympics, California does have 1 gold medalist from the 1928 Winter Games.

At the 2016 Summer Olympics, California's at the time enrolled students won at total of 18 medals, including 9 gold ones. Sixteen of those medals were won in swimming.

Games	Gold	Silver	Bronze	Total
Summer Olympics	90	40	28	158
Winter Olympics	1	0	0	1
Totals (2 entries)	91	40	28	159
