= Oski Yell =

Tradition at the University of California Berkeley

The Oski Yell is the University of California Berkeley spirit yell from which the school’s mascot, Oski the Bear, derives his name. Although Oski appeared in 1941, the yell was first performed around the turn of the 20th century. The yell's origins are uncertain, although the University of Illinois originated a similar yell in 1899 (with a different last line). Another early version is credited to Vince Wirtz, who led a similar cheer beginning in the 1920s at football games for Hamilton, Ontario teams.

== Lyrics ==
Berkeley's lyrics are:

Oski Wow-Wow!
Whiskey Wee-Wee!
Olee! Muckie-eye!
Olee! Berkeley-eye!
California! Wow!

The Oski Yell is currently rarely heard in the stands, its function overtaken by spirit songs such as "Big C," "Fight for California," and "Sons of California." It can still be heard thundering from the Greek Theatre on Friday nights before the Big Game at the annual Big Game Rally.

== Oskee Wee Wee ==
The Hamilton Tiger-Cats of the Canadian Football League have a version of the Oski Yell, originally created by Vince Wirtz in the early 1920s. Wirtz developed the choreography for the cheer which was performed by "Pigskin Pete". The yell is still in use in a modified form called "Oskee Wee Wee" by the current Pigskin Pete at Tiger-Cats games:

Oskee Wee Wee
Oskee Waa Waa
Holy Mackinaw
Tigers ... Eat 'em RAW!!

Wirtz's original version of the cheer is the following:

Oskee Wee Wee
Whiskey Wa Wa
Holy Mackinaw
Tigers ... Eat'em RAW!!

In 1968, the cheer was the subject of a National Film Board of Canada documentary Oskee Wee Wee.

== Bossy Cow-Cow ==
A parody of the Berkeley cheer, called the Bossy Cow-Cow, exists at UC Davis (which was originally established as a farm for the use of Berkeley's College of Agriculture). This variation of the cheer made its debut during UCD's 1926 football game against the College of the Pacific.

Bossy Cow-Cow!
Honey Bee-Bee!
Oleo! Margarine!
Oleo! Butterine!
Alfalfa! Hay!

Once hailed by Sports Illustrated as the "most obtuse cheer" in college football, the Bossy Cow-Cow is still used today by the UC Davis Marching Band during their football pregame field shows.
