= Robert O. Briggs =

Robert Orlando Briggs (August 20, 1927 − September 17, 2008) was the longtime director of the University of California Marching Band. He was the fourth full-time director since the founding of the band in 1891.

== Biography ==
Briggs was born in Modesto, California on August 20, 1927, the great-grandson of pioneer James Briggs, who cofounded the town. He graduated from Modesto High School and briefly attended Modesto Junior College before entering University of California, Berkeley in 1947. Briggs joined the Cal Band, played the cornet and took up the french horn. After graduating with a bachelor's degree in music in 1951, he joined the United States Army and served in the Korean War, joining Army bands at Fort Ord, Monterey, California, and Okinawa, Japan. Later, he earned a master's degree in music from San Francisco State University.

After his military service, he landed the post of band director of Armijo High School in Fairfield, California, which he held until 1967, when he returned to Cal to assist Cal Band director James Berdahl. When Berdahl took a leave of absence in 1971, Briggs filled in as acting director before being officially appointed Cal Band director in 1973.

Briggs served as the director of bands at UC Berkeley until his retirement in 1995 and was succeeded in the position by Robert Calonico. His retirement was spent starting the Solano Winds, a local community concert band in Fairfield. He died on September 17, 2008.
