= University of California Marching Band =

Marching band at the University of California, Berkeley

The University of California Marching Band
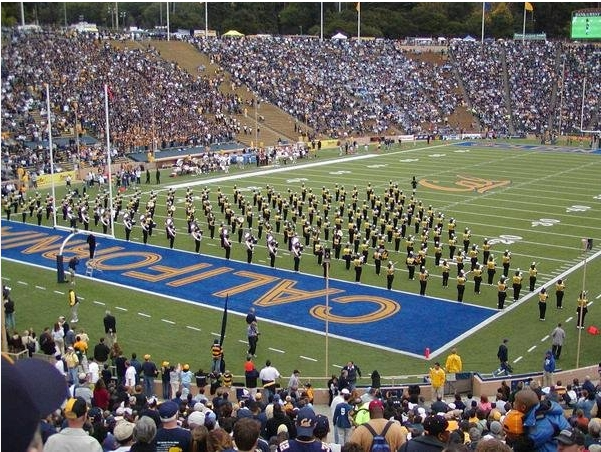
- The Cal Band during the 2004 marching season.
- School: University of California
- Location: Berkeley, California
- Conference: Atlantic Coast Conference
- Founded: 1891
- Director: Dr. Matthew Sadowski
- Members: 240 (2026)
- Fight song: "Fight for California", "Big C, "Sons of California"
- Website: calband.berkeley.edu

The University of California Marching Band, usually shortened to Cal Band, is the marching band for the University of California, Berkeley. While it is administered under the auspices of the university, the Cal Band is almost completely student-run and represents Cal at sporting events and other social gatherings. The name of the band is officially "The University of California Band" according to the constitution, but is typically called "The University of California Marching Band" or "The Cal Band". When the band marches out of Memorial Stadium's North Tunnel for football pre-games, it is referred to as "The Pacesetter of College Marching Bands, the Pride of California".

== Leadership ==
Unlike most other collegiate marching bands, the Cal Band is not under the university's Department of Music, but rather the Division of Student Affairs. The executive committee is the administrative head of the Cal Band and is formed by five student leaders and the only University-paid employee, the Director. The five student positions are the Drum Major, the Student Director, the Executive Secretary, the Public Relations Director and the Senior Manager, each in charge of a specific point of leadership within the band. While the Senior Manager is elected by the previous Executive Committee, all the other student Executive Committee positions are elected by secret ballot. Candidates for each position with the majority vote of the Band serve for one calendar year.

Unlike other major collegiate bands, students will run rehearsals, pick the songs, chart the shows, arrange any trips, and handle promotions through committee vote. This allows members to build their resumes and gain work experience. As of October 2026, the Band has 240 members (no color guard or auxiliary).

After Robert Calonico's retirement in June 2018, Dr. Matthew Sadowski was named the university's new director of bands.

== History ==
The Cal Band has its roots in the University Cadet Band, established in 1891. In 1923, the Band was sponsored by the Associated Students of the University of California (ASUC), and its student leadership structure was formalized two years later. In the early years (prior to 1971), various faculty from the Music department were appointed director of the band through an arrangement with the ASUC.

After the 1950 Rose Bowl against Ohio State University, the Cal Band adopted its iconic high step marching style due to its lackluster performance in comparison to Ohio State's marching band. It is one of only three bands in the former Pac-12 (the others being the Spirit of Troy and the University of Washington Husky Marching Band), and one of the few outside the Big Ten Conference to use this physically demanding style. The Straw Hat Band, a voluntary subset of the Cal Band, was also established that same year.

After Professor Cushing (director from 1934 to 1950) resigned from backlash after the 1950 Rose Bowl Game, the Music Department was asked to provide the ASUC with a new Director for the Band. Coincidentally, James Berdahl (Student Director in 1938) was returning to Berkeley to work on his doctoral studies in music. The Music Department Chairman, Albert Elkus, convinced Berdahl to serve as acting Director of the Cal Band until the department could find a permanent replacement for Professor Cushing. Berdahl became permanent Director of the Cal Band at the end of the 1951 season, and remained in that position until 1971.

In the fall of 1968, Dr. David W. Tucker (Ph.D., Cal, 1969) was hired as arranger and composer. He was appointed associate director in 1969. His responsibilities with the Cal Band included rehearsing, auditioning prospective new members, and directing on the football field opposite director James Berdahl. For the 1971 season, during Berdahl's sabbatical year in Japan, Tucker was named acting director. At the end of the 1971 season, Tucker left the Cal Band to accept the newly created position of Director of the University of California Jazz Ensembles, after having been the volunteer director since 1969.

During the 1971 season, substantial podium time was taken by Assistant Director Robert O. Briggs. He was appointed acting director in 1972, and was made director in 1973.

In the 1970s, sponsorship moved from the ASUC to the university and a new band constitution was written. In the Spring Quarter of 1973, the all-male band voted to admit women, in the face of Title IX sanctions against the university, which was now the Band's primary funding source. There were fewer than 10 dissenting votes, against more than 100 votes in favor of admitting women. In the Fall 1973 marching season, women comprised 21 of the 123 members of the band. Although they rehearsed, marched and performed with the Band beginning in 1973, women were not entirely accepted by the Band's "inner fellowship" until through attrition the dissenting all-male band veterans had rotated out of the Band. More recently, the Band's membership and leadership has consisted of an even split of men and women, thus successfully breaking any barriers that had previously existed that had prevented women from fully participating in the Cal Band.

Director Emeritus Robert O. Briggs died in 2008, leaving a legacy of musicianship spanning two generations of musicians.

== Performances ==
The Cal Band has been seen and heard at a variety of performance venues. In the recent past, the Cal Band has appeared at the San Francisco Symphony's "Black and White Ball", performed for such names as George Shultz (former U.S. Secretary of State), Peter E. Haas and family (UC Berkeley benefactors and the owners of Levi Strauss & Co.), and George Lucas. In addition, the Cal Band has been seen on "The Ed Sullivan Show", the nationally syndicated game show "Wheel of Fortune", Santa Rosa TV 50's morning program, KTVU Channel 2's "Mornings on Two", KRON Channel 4's newscasts, "Bay Area Backroads", and sportscaster Vernon Glen's "Mr. Involvement". The Cal Band sound has been heard on dozens of Bay Area radio stations, such as WiLD 94.9 and KMEL 106.1, Live 105, and K101, and rounds out its exposure on the pages of numerous Bay Area newspapers. In 2010, 2012, and 2014, the band also led the San Francisco Giants victory parade in downtown San Francisco.

In 2016, the band played alongside Coldplay, Beyoncé, and Bruno Mars in the Super Bowl 50 halftime show. On May 18, 2016, the Cal Band traveled to Beijing, China and performed at the Juyongguan Pass section of the Great Wall. In 2018, the Cal Band led the Warriors Victory Parade in downtown Oakland after the Golden State Warriors' win over the Cleveland Cavaliers.

Nearly every year, the band also goes to play at various ski resorts located in the Lake Tahoe region to play songs for Cal fans.

Before 2002, in the spring, the Band performed a traditional "Spring Show" in UC Berkeley's Zellerbach Auditorium, combining the marching and playing talents of the band with other, hidden talents usually reserved for off the football field. Spring Show was discontinued in 2002 after financial burdens to the band resulting from funding cuts to the University of California system. In 2009, the Spring Show was brought back and has continued ever since.

In a different sort of performance, the Cal Band was asked to help with a Nobel Lecture by George Smoot in 2006 by recreating "The Big Bang".

== Football performances ==
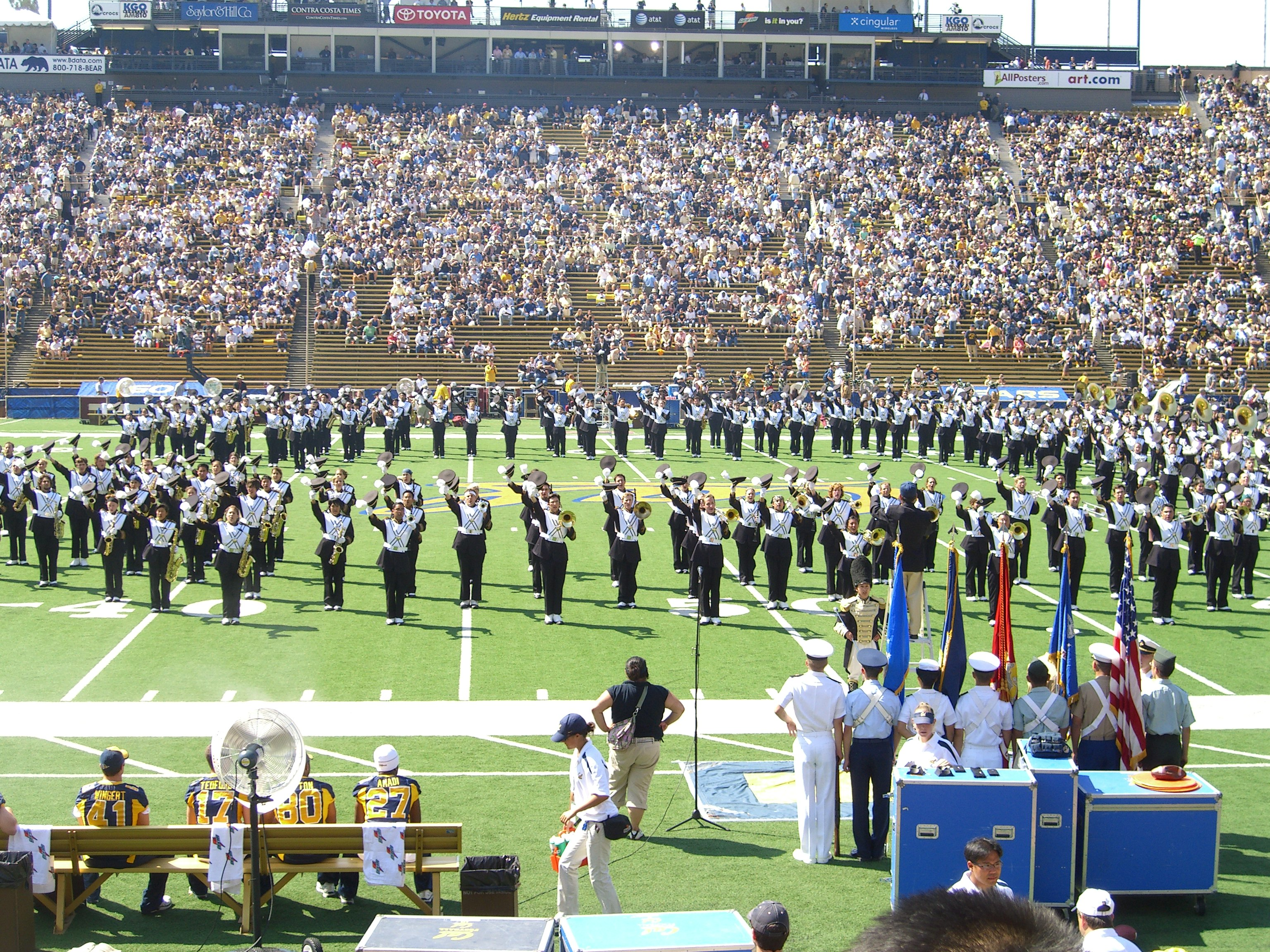
The Cal Band performs during a pre-game show

During weeks of home football games, the Cal Band gives several performances. On Fridays before a game, the Cal Band plays at the noon rallies on Sproul Plaza. On game days the Cal Band gives a concert on Sproul Plaza an hour and a half before kickoff. Following this performance, the Band marches in formation to California Memorial Stadium, leading a procession of Cal alumni and fans. During home football games the band gives a pre-game show, a half time show that changes every week, and typically a musical performance after the game as the crowd leaves. During the game, the band is seated to the left of the primary student section, and plays stand songs, as well as fight songs throughout the game. A "break off" band performed in the front of each major section during the third quarter prior to the 2012 renovation of California Memorial Stadium. In 2017, the band played alongside University of Washington Husky Marching Band in their “Tribute to Horn Bands” show, featuring music from The Blues Brothers, Tower of Power, Earth, Wind & Fire, and Chicago.

In the Bleacher Report's power ranking of the top 25 college marching band pregames shows and traditions, the Cal Band was named 9th as having a show that "beckons [the] former glory days, full of school songs and traditional formations" and is "a stand-alone classic".

== Instrumentation ==
The Cal Band uses a fairly standard military band instrumentation with piccolos, clarinets, alto saxophones, tenor saxophones, trumpets, mellophones, trombones, baritones, sousaphones, glockenspiels, snare drums, tenor drums, bass drums, and cymbals.

== California Alumni Band ==
The California Alumni Band, usually shorted to Cal Alumni Band, is a marching band consisting of former Cal Band members. It was originally founded by Herb Towler, Dave Wenrich and Dick Auslen. The Cal Alumni Band is run by the non-profit Cal Band Alumni Association and is a subset of the Cal Alumni Association, an organization that handles alumni affairs of the University of California, Berkeley.

The Cal Alumni Band performs at various events such as: San Francisco AIDS Walk, Alumni Band Day, the Fourth of July Parade in Sausalito, California, Cal Basketball Games, and many other performances in the San Francisco Bay Area and across California.

== Works cited ==
- The Pride of California: A Cal Band Centennial Celebration. Cal Band Alumni Association. 1993. Archived from the original on February 27, 2026.
