= 1982 NCAA Division I Men's Swimming and Diving Championships =

American college aquatic sports competition

1982 NCAA Division I Swimming and Diving Championships
- Host city: Brown Deer, Wisconsin
- Date(s): March 1982
- Venue(s): Schroeder Swimming Center

The 1982 NCAA Men's Division I Swimming and Diving Championships were contested in March 1982 at the Schroeder Swimming Center in Brown Deer, Wisconsin at the 59th annual NCAA-sanctioned swim meet to determine the team and individual national champions of Division I men's collegiate swimming and diving in the United States.

UCLA topped the team standings for the first time; as of 2016, this remains the Bruins' only men's team title.

The inaugural NCAA Women's Division I Swimming and Diving Championships were held concurrently at the O'Connell Center at the University of Florida in Gainesville, Florida and were won by hosts Florida. The men's and women's titles would not be held at the same site until 2006.

== Team standings ==
- Note: Top 10 only
- (H) = Hosts
- ^{(DC)} = Defending champions
- Full results

Rank	Team	Points
1st place, gold medalist(s)	UCLA	219
2nd place, silver medalist(s)	Texas ^{(DC)}	210
3rd place, bronze medalist(s)	Stanford	191
4	California	170
5	Florida	121
6	Arizona State	114
7	Alabama; USC	112
9	Miami (FL)	97
10	SMU	90

== See also ==
- List of college swimming and diving teams
