= Oski the Bear =

Sports mascot

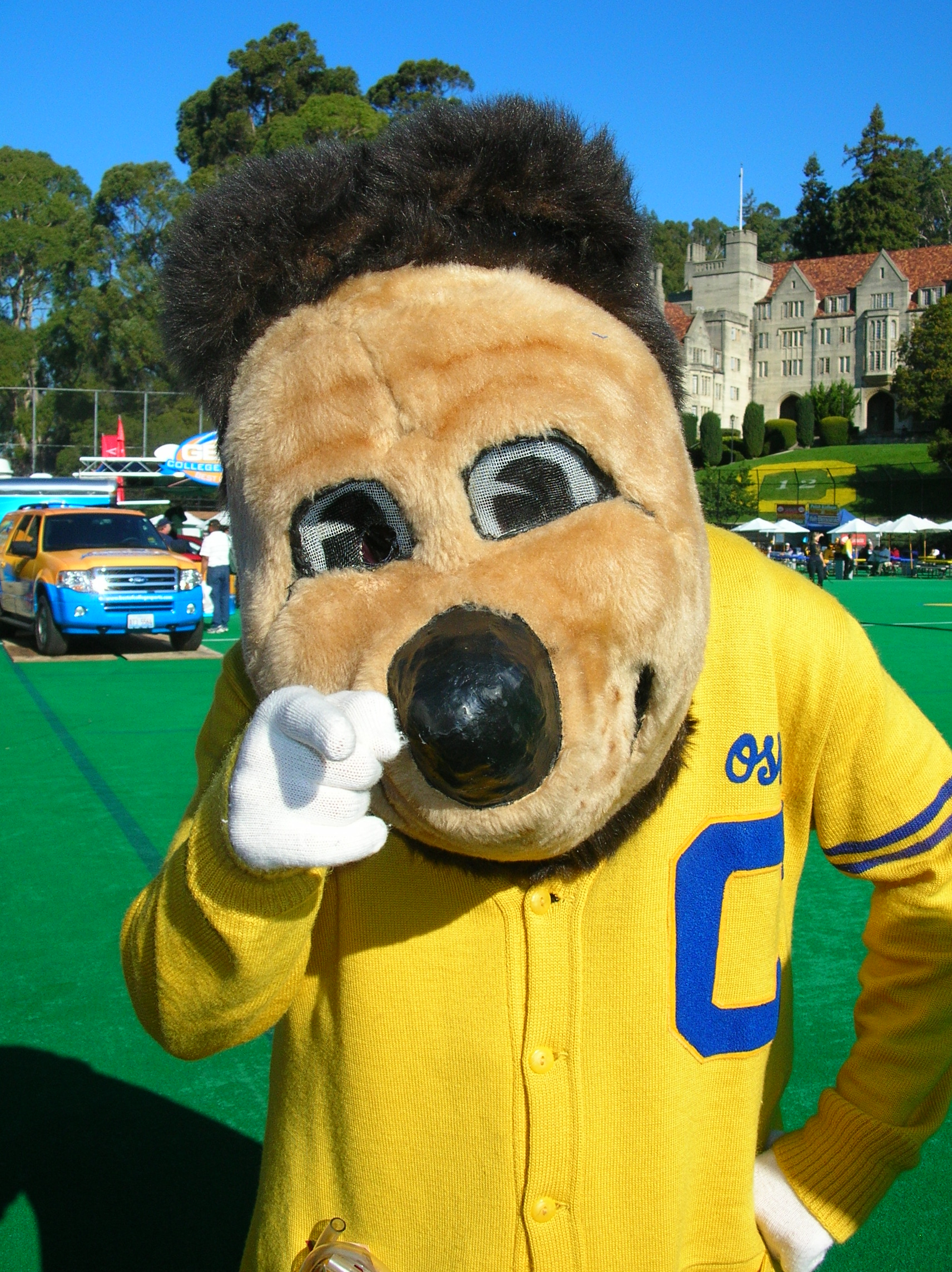
- Oski in front of Bowles Hall
- University: University of California, Berkeley
- Conference: ACC
- Description: Anthropomorphic Bear
- First seen: September 27, 1941

Oski the Bear (Oski) is the official mascot of the University of California, Berkeley ("Cal"), representing the California Golden Bears. Named after the Oski Yell, he made his debut at a freshman rally in the Greek Theatre on September 25, 1941. Prior to his debut, live bears were used as Cal mascots. Oski's name, design, and character were developed by William “Rocky” Rockwell, who was the first student to play the role, and Warrington Colescott, an editor of The Daily Californian and famed satirist.

Since his debut, Oski's activities have been managed by the Oski Committee, which also appoints a new Oski whenever a replacement is required. Historically, persons who played Oski were male and of short stature (under 5'7"), although the gender requirement was dropped around 1974.

Oski's identity is protected by the Committee, and other than Rockwell, traditionally Oskis do not reveal their name. However, recently there has been a trend of Oskis revealing themselves on social media, in part to show that Oskis are representative of the campus community. There is a volunteer advisor that can provide guidance to the committee. To that end, there may be multiple members of the Committee who wear the suit, depending on their schedules.

== Incidents ==
Oski was controversially suspended for two weeks in January 1990 for throwing a cake towards Oregon State fans. Some of the cake landed on the father of Oregon State point guard Gary Payton.

In 1999, the Associated Students of the University of California (ASUC) passed a bill calling for a makeover of the "poorly constructed and pathetic version of a bear". The ASUC president vetoed the bill.

Given the rivalry with UC Berkeley and Stanford University, Oski frequently fights with Stanford's unofficial mascot, the Stanford Tree. During the 1988 Big Game, Oski and the Tree became entangled in an altercation that required security to intervene.

In 1995, an inebriated Oski and the Tree fought at a nationally televised basketball game, which was later narrated by Charley Steiner on that evening's SportsCenter and resulted in global coverage. Stanford police announced that misdemeanor charges could be filed against both parties, although none were ultimately filed. Since then, all Oskis participating in Big Games have had to be breathalyzed before entrance.
