= Marin Rowing Association =

American rowing club

- Motto: "Go Row"
- Location: Greenbrae, California
- Home water: Corte Madera Creek
- Founded: 1968
- Former names: Redwood Crew
- Key people: Kate Boyd (President)
- Website: www.marinrowing.org

Distinctions
- 2006 USRowing Club of the Year

The Marin Rowing Association, located in Greenbrae, California, US is a rowing association and non-profit organization founded in 1968 by Coach R.C. "Bob" Cumming.

== History ==
For the first eight years of its existence, the program was composed of high school boys from Redwood High School and what the club called the "Cardiac 8+". The Cardiac 8+ was a small group of men who had previously rowed in college and continued to row on Sunday mornings. That group of men, including Olympian Dick Draeger, held the facility and equipment together.

In 1977, U.C. Berkeley rower Jana Barto began a high school program for women from Redwood High School, and in 1982 Olympian Lou Lindsey joined Coach Cumming to run the men's team, taking over in 1984 after the death of Coach Cumming.

Today both the boys and girls teams, recruiting throughout Marin, row under the name of the Marin Rowing Association.

Numerous Marin juniors have raced on Junior National Teams throughout the years, and some have gone on to represent the United States at the World Rowing Championships and the Olympics. Scott Munn, Fred Honebein, Tim Evans, Tim Ryan and Jerome Ryan, Mike Altman, Brian Ebke and Nito Simonsen are all Marin Rowing Association alumni.

Marin Rowing Association Olympians

Athlete/Coach	Year	Location	Event
Richard Draeger	1960	Rome	M2+
Lou Lindsay	1960	Rome	M8+ Coach
Scott Munn	1992	Barcelona	M8+
Tim Evans	1992	Barcelona	M8+
Fred Honebein	1996	Atlanta	M8+
Nito Simonsen	2000	Sydney	M4-
Nito Simonsen	2004	Athens	M2x
Mike Altman	2004	Athens	MLT Spare
Mike Altman	2008	Beijing	MLT4-

The club is currently managed by Sandy Armstrong, who was honored with the USRowing Ernestine Bayer Award at the 2013 USRowing Annual Convention.

== Junior team ==
The Marin Rowing Association offers a competitive high school rowing program for boys and girls from schools including Redwood High School, Tamalpais High School, Archie Williams High School, Marin Catholic High School, Marin Academy, San Francisco University High School, San Domenico High School, The Branson School, Convent of the Sacred Heart High School, Casa Grande High School, San Marin High School, and more.

The Marin juniors are divided into four teams: Under 19 Girls, Under 19 Boys, Under 15/16/17 Girls, and Under 15/16/17 Boys.

Coach	U19 Boys	U19 Girls	U15/16/17 Boys	U15/16/17 Girls
Head coach	Geordie Macleod	Sandy Armstrong	Tim Humphrey	Rodrigo Rodrigues
Assistant Coach	Amanda Harvey	Julio Soares	Murphy Stearns	Laurel Johnson

=== Head of the Charles ===
==== 2010 ====
At the 46th Head of the Charles Regatta in 2010, the Marin boys eight made history by racing from the 69th starting position to win their event, posting a course record (14:50.246) in the process. The girls eight, came in second, just four seconds behind first place.

==== 2011 ====
At the 47th Head of the Charles Regatta in 2011, the Marin boys again placed first. The Marin girls, on the other hand, finished in second place for the second year in a row.

==== 2012 ====
At the 48th Head of the Charles Regatta in 2012, the Marin boys repeated their victory for the third year in a row, this time with a decisive lead of more than 33 seconds to the second finisher. The Marin girls finished in 5th place.

==== 2013 ====
At the 49th Head of the Charles Regatta in 2013, the Marin boys extended their record victory streak to four consecutive wins.

Marin Men's Youth 8+ on the awards stage at Head of the Charles Regatta in 2013

The Marin girls finished in 3rd in the Youth 8+ event, less than a second behind the second place finisher.

==== 2014 ====
At the 50th Head of the Charles Regatta in 2014, the Marin boys placed 2nd by a margin of 1.5 seconds ending their four year streak. The girls walked away with a 5th place finish.

==== 2015 ====
At the 51st Head of the Charles Regatta in 2015, the boys from Marin came in first place over bay area rival Oakland Strokes by a dominating 11 seconds while the Marin girls came home with a second place finish.

==== 2016 ====
At the 52nd Head of the Charles Regatta in 2016, the Marin boys and girls both finished second out of 85 entires.

==== 2017 ====
At the 53rd Head of the Charles Regatta in 2017, the Marin girls finished sixth out of 85 entries. Marin boys finished eighth out of 85 entries.

==== 2018 ====
At the 54th Head of the Charles Regatta in 2018, the Marin boys and girls both finished tenth out of 85 entires.

==== 2019 ====
At the 55th Head of the Charles Regatta in 2019, the Marin boys finished fifth out of 86 entries. The Marin girls received bronze in an event of 85 entries.

==== 2021 ====
At the "Head of the Charles Regatta 2021," the Marin boys finished seventh out of 80 entries. The Marin girls received silver in an event of 76 entries.

==== 2022 ====
At the "Head of the Charles Regatta 2022," the Marin boys finished sixth out of 89 entries. The Marin girls finished fifth out of 89 entries.

==== 2023 ====
At the "Head of the Charles Regatta 2023," the Marin boys finished eighth out of 90 entries. The Marin girls finished seventh out of 89 entries.

==== 2024 ====
At the "Head of the Charles Regatta 2024," the Marin boys finished second out of 90 entries. The Marin girls finished ninth out of 90 entries.

==== 2025 ====
At the "Head of the Charles Regatta 2025," the Marin boys finished ninth out of 86 entries. The Marin girls finished seventh out of 86 entries.

=== San Diego Crew Classic ===
The Marin Rowing Association has won a variety of events at the San Diego Crew Classic over the years. In 2012 and 2014 however, the Marin Rowing Varsity Boys achieved a sweep of all three junior events, becoming the first team to ever do so as well as the first team to ever repeat the achievement. In recent years, the club has dominated events across all age categories; in 2023 they won all but two youth events they entered, the two non-gold results being silver medals. In 2024, MRA won 4 of 7 events they entered, placing on the podium for all 7 events. In the Men's Youth B 8+ Jean Jessop Hervey Cup, MRA received both gold and silver for their 2 entries.

=== USRowing Youth National Championships ===
The Marin Rowing Association has won national championships on numerous occasions. Previously, the Marin Rowing juniors had won several gold medals at the USRowing Youth National Championships at Harsha Lake near Cincinnati, OH; amongst them, the Men's Youth Lightweight 8+ in 2004, the Men's Youth Double Sculls in 2007 and the Women's Youth 8+ in 2008 and 2009.

In more recent years, the Marin Rowing juniors have consistently been top finishers nationally in various boats.

==== 2009 ====
The Marin Rowing Men's Youth 8+ placed 5th, with the Men's Youth Lightweight 8+ placing 2nd by .28 seconds.

==== 2010 ====
Both the Men's Youth 8+ and Men's Youth Lightweight 8+ came in second.

==== 2011 ====
Was a unique year for Marin Rowing's youth team, which became the first team to sweep the USRowing Youth National Championship with victories in the Men's & Women's Youth 8+ as well as the Men's Youth Lightweight 8+ (composed of 6 novice) at the Oak Ridge, TN venue.

==== 2012 ====
The Marin Men's Youth Lightweight 8+ and Youth 8+ won gold in both events for the second year in a row, while the Women's Youth 8+ finished with a silver medal.

==== 2013 ====
At the 2013 Youth National Championship in Oak Ridge, TN, the men and women's squads from Marin came away with four medals out of the five boats sent. The Women's Youth 8+ won decisively; crossing the finish line with open-water over the second place finisher. The Men's Youth 8+ took third place, while the Men's Youth Lightweight 8+ came home with a second place finish. The Men's Youth 4+ earned a bronze medal and the Men's Youth Lightweight 4+ finished in fourth.

==== 2014 ====
At the 2014 Youth National Championship in Sacramento, CA, was another successful year for the Marin Rowing junior team. The Men's Youth 8+, after overcoming several injuries right before the regatta, finished in 5th place, while the Men's Youth Lightweight 8+ won gold. The Women's Youth 8+ finished in 7th place, while the Women's Youth 2- won by open water.

==== 2015 ====
At the 2015 Youth National Championship in Sarasota, FL the men's and women's teams sent five boats. The Men's Youth 8+ finished 4th, the Women's Youth 8+ finished 10th, the Women's Youth 4+ finished 7th, the Women's Youth Lightweight 4+ finished 5th, while the Men's Youth Lightweight 8+ finished 3rd.

==== 2016 ====
At the 2016 Youth National Championship in West Windsor, NJ the Men's Youth 8+ finished 2nd, the Men's Youth Lightweight 8+ finished 4th, while the Women's Youth 8+ finished 6th.

==== 2017 ====
At the 2017 Youth National Championship in Sarasota, FL the Men's and Women's teams sent four boats. The Men's Youth 8+ finished 9th, the Women's Youth 8+ finished 3rd, the Men's Youth Lightweight 8+ finished 3rd, and the Women's Youth Lightweight 8+ finished 5th.

==== 2019 ====
At the 2019 Youth National Championship in Sarasota, FL the Men's and Women's teams sent four boats. The Men's Youth 8+ finished 5th, the Women's Youth 8+ finished 10th, the Men's Youth Lightweight 8+ finished 8th, and the Women's Youth Lightweight 8+ finished 2nd.

==== 2021 ====
At the 2021 Youth National Championships in Sarasota, FL the Men's team sent three boats, and the women's team sent one boat. The Men's Youth 4+ finished 4th, the Men's youth 4x won gold by 0.007 seconds, and the Men's U17 2x finished 6th. The Women's Youth 8+ finished 1st in the B-final, 7th overall.

==== 2022 ====
At the 2022 Youth National Championships in Sarasota, FL the Men's and Women's teams sent four boats. The Men's Youth 8+ finished 5th, the Men's Youth 2V 8+ finished 1st, the Men's U17 8+ finished 1st, and the Men's U16 8+ finished 2nd. The Women's Youth 8+ finished 6th after a boat-stopping crab in the last 500m of the race, the Women's Youth 2V 8+ finished 1st, the Women's U16 8+ finished 1st, and the Women's U17 4+ finished 5th.

==== 2023 ====
At the 2023 Youth National Championships in Sarasota, FL the Men's team sent five boats and the Women's team sent four. The Men's Youth 8+ finished 4th, the Men's Youth 2V 8+ first entry finished 1st for the second year in a row, the Men's Youth 2V 8+ second entry finished 2nd in the B-final, 10th overall. The Men's U17 8+ finished 4th, and the Men's U16 8+ finished 1st. The Women's Youth 8+ finished 1st, the Women's 2V 8+ finished 4th, the Women's U17 8+ finished 4th, and the Women's U16 8+ finished 1st for the second year in a row. This year's results matched the record set in the prior year for the club's best performance at USRowing Youth National Championships at four national titles.

==== 2024 ====
At the 2024 Youth National Championships in Sarasota, FL the Men's team sent four boats and the Women's team sent two. The Men's Youth 8+ finished 7th, the Men's Youth 2V 8+ finished 1st for the third year in a row, the Men's U17 8+ finished 1st, and the Men's U16 8+ finished 2nd. The Women's Youth 8+ and the Women's U17 8+ finished 2nd in their respective events.

=== Marin Rowing Association USRowing Youth National Championship Tabulated Results ===
Gold Medal	Silver Medal	Bronze Medal
1996 Men's Youth 4+	1997 Men's Youth 4+	1997 Women's Youth 8+
1997 Men's Youth 1x	2001 Men's Youth 8+	2002 Men's Youth 8+
2004 Men's Lightweight 8+	2001 Women's Youth 8+	2002 Men's Lightweight 8+
2007 Men's Youth 2x	2003 Men's Lightweight 8+	2003 Women's Youth 8+
2008 Women's Youth 8+	2004 Women's Youth 8+	2005 Men's Youth 8+
2009 Women's Youth 8+	2005 Men's Lightweight 4+	2006 Women's Lightweight 8+
2011 Men's Youth 8+	2005 Men's Youth 1x	2013 Men's Youth 8+
2011 Women's Youth 8+	2007 Women's Lightweight 8+	2013 Men's Youth 4+
2011 Men's Lightweight 8+	2009 Men's Lightweight 8+	2015 Men's Lightweight 8+
2012 Men's Youth 8+	2010 Men's Youth 8+	2017 Women's Youth 8+
2012 Men's Lightweight 8+	2010 Men's Lightweight 8+	2017 Men's Lightweight 8+
2013 Women's Youth 8+	2012 Women's Youth 8+	2018 Women's Lightweight 8+
2014 Women's Youth 2-	2013 Men's Lightweight 8+	2025 Men's Youth 8+
2014 Men's Lightweight 8+	2016 Men's Youth 8+	2026 Men's Youth 8+
2021 Men's Youth 4x	2019 Women's Youth Lightweight 8+	
2022 Men's Youth 2V 8+	2022 Men's U16 8+	
2022 Women's Youth 2V 8+	2024 Women's Youth 8+	
2022 Men's U17 8+	2024 Women's U17 8+	
2022 Women's U16 8+	2024 Men's U16 8+	
2023 Women's Youth 8+	2025 Men's U17 8+	
2023 Men's Youth 2V 8+	2026 Men's Youth 2V 8+	
2023 Men's U16 8+	2026 Women's U16 8+	
2023 Women's U16 8+		
2024 Men's Youth 2V 8+		
2024 Men's U17 8+		
2025 Men's Youth 4-		
2025 Women's Youth 4-		
2025 Men's Youth 2V 8+		
2026 Men's U16 8+		

=== SRAA National Championships ===
In 2017, the Marin boys sent their Freshmen 8+ to complete at the Scholastic National Championship in Camden, NJ where they won gold.

Marin Rowing Association SRAA National Championship Results

Gold Medal	Silver Medal	Bronze Medal
2017 Men's Freshmen 8+	2018 Men's Freshmen 8+	

=== Junior National Team Athletes ===
Marin Rowing Association Junior National Team Athletes

Athlete	Location	Year	Event	Seat	Place
Joely Cherniss	St. Catharines, Canada	2024	W8+	6	SILVER
Maisy Ballantyne	St. Catharines, Canada	2024	Alternate	N/A	N/A
Joely Cherniss	Paris, France	2023	W8+	Stroke	4th
Maisy Ballantyne	Belgrade, Serbia	2023	Alternate	N/A	N/A
George Doty	Racice, Czech Republic	2018	M4+	Cox	SILVER
Leif Carlson	Trakai, Lithuania	2017	M4-	3	4th
Ethan Seder	Rotterdam, Netherlands	2016	M8+	4	SILVER
Ian Low	Rotterdam, Netherlands	2016	M4-	Stroke	4th
Lindsay Noah	Rotterdam, Netherlands	2016	W8+	7	5th
Sarah Commesso	Rotterdam, Netherlands	2016	W8+	Stroke	5th
Lindsay Noah	Rio de Janeiro, Brazil	2015	W8+	7	BRONZE
Ethan Seder	Rio de Janeiro, Brazil	2015	M8+	5	SILVER
Mark Levinson	Rio de Janeiro, Brazil	2015	M8+	Stroke	SILVER
Piers Deeth-Stehlin	Rio de Janeiro, Brazil	2015	M4+	Bow	4th
Brennan Wertz	Hamburg, Germany	2014	M8+	5	9th
Lily Hansen	Hamburg, Germany	2014	W8+	Cox	5th
Julia Burgess	Trakai, Lithuania	2013	W8+	4	5th
Jackson Dobronyi	Trakai, Lithuania	2013	M8+	5	7th
Julian Goldman	Trakai, Lithuania	2013	M8+	Stroke	7th
Camille Kisseberth	Trakai, Lithuania	2013	Alternate	Bow	N/A
Peter Woolley	Trakai, Lithuania	2013	M4-	2	6th
Julian Goldman	Plovdiv, Bulgaria	2012	M8+	Stroke	5th
Riley Overfield	Plovdiv, Bulgaria	2012	M8+	Cox	5th
Peter Woolley	Plovdiv, Bulgaria	2012	M8+	2	5th
Caitlin Byrnes	Eton, Great Britain	2011	W8+	4	BRONZE
Logan Harris	Eton, Great Britain	2011	W8+	3	BRONZE
Patrick Konttinen	Eton, Great Britain	2011	M4-	Stroke	12th
Charlotte Passot	Eton, Great Britain	2011	W8+	7	BRONZE
Greig Stein	Eton, Great Britain	2011	M4-	Bow	12th
Maddie Wolf	Eton, Great Britain	2011	W8+	6	BRONZE
Zach Johnson	Račice, Czech Republic	2010	M8+	Stroke	GOLD

=== Indoor Rowing World Records ===
In 2013, at the annual Marin Rowing Erg-A-Thon, the Marin Junior boys and girls teams set two Concept2 ergometer world records. The boys completed 466,156 meters in 24 hours to set the Male 19 and Under Hwt world record with 77 rowers. The girls rowed 392,521 meters in 24 hours to set the Female 19 and Under Hwt world record with 76 rowers. The Erg-A-Thon took place from February 2 to February 3, 2013 at Bon Air Shopping Center in Greenbrae, CA.

In 2014, the Marin Juniors (both boys and girls) worked together to set another world record at the annual Erg-A-Thon. Both the boys and the girls completed 445,958 meters in 24 hours to set the Mixed 19 and Under Hwt world record. 153 rowers (78 boys and 75 girls) contributed to setting this record. The 2014 Erg-A-Thon was again held at Bon Air Shopping Center in Greenbrae, CA from February 1 to February 2, 2014.

In 2015, a Marin junior Ethan Seder pulled 19:31.0 for the 6k erg piece. Ethan broke the Concept 2 Indoor Rowing World Record for the 15-16 age category.

== Masters Team ==
In 1984, Jana Barto and Joan Corbett started a masters rowing program for adult women. Originally the rowers were parents of the junior men and women, but today that original program has split into Novice, B-level competitive, and A-level competitive men and women, with the competitive/advanced level winning numerous gold medals at State Championship races, the Masters Nationals and the FISA World Regatta.

The Marin Masters team is split into Novice, B-level, and A-level.

Coach	Novice	B-Level Men	B-Level Women	A-Level Men	A-Level Women
Head Coach	Felix Meier	Benjamin Kropelnicki	Laurel Johnson	Rodrigo Rodrigues	Julio Soares
Assistant Coach	None	None	Murphy Stearns	None	None

The Marin Masters have a long-standing history of success at numerous national and international regattas. These include Head of the Charles Regatta, San Diego Crew Classic, Henley Masters Regatta and more.

Head of the Charles Tabulated Results (Incomplete Table)
Gold	Silver	Bronze	4th	5th
2023 Men's Grand Master Eights	2023 Men's Senior Master Eights	2023 Women's Grand Master Eights	2023 Men's Senior Master Fours	2024 Men's Grand Master Fours
2023Men's Master Eights	2024 Men's Grand Master Eights		2023 Men's Grand Master Fours	
2024 Men's Senior Master Eights	2024 Men's Master Eights			
2024 Women's Grand Master Eights	2024 Men's Senior Master Fours			
2024 Women's Senior Master Fours				

At the 2013 Head of the Charles Regatta, the Marin Masters came home with six wins. The Men's Senior Master 8+ boat (50 and over) finished first and set a new course record of 15:29.87. For the third year in a row, the Women's Senior Master 8+ boat (50 and over) finished in first place and also set a new course record of 17:35.75. In the Senior Veteran Single (70 and over), Landon Carter earned a gold medal. In the 4+s, the Men's Master 4+ (40 and over) and the Women's Senior Master 4+ (50 and over) both won with the women's four earning another course record. The Men's Veteran 4+ (70 and over) won gold.

2013 was the first year the Marin Rowing Association won the Head of the Charles Team Points Trophy, an honor usually only earned by accomplished collegiate rowing teams.

In 2014 Marin came home with one first place finish in the Men's Senior Master 50+ Eight.

At the 2015 San Diego Crew Classic, Marin took first and third in the Men's Club Eight, a feat never completed before at the crew classic.

At the 2015 Henley Master's regatta, Marin came home with wins in the Men's E4+ and F4+.

At the 2025 Henley Master's regatta, Marin came home with wins in the Men's D8+ and E8+.
