= Sons of California =

"Sons of California" is a fight song of the University of California, Berkeley, as well as the University of California, Davis. It was composed by Clinton "Brick" Morse in 1896. Although it was originally an unpopular song among students because of its slow and solemn hymn, the Cal Band began performing a more lively version in the 1930s. From then on, "Sons of California" would remain one of the best-known songs at the university.

== Lyrics ==
Sons of California

We are Sons of California
A loyal company;
All shout for California
While we strive for victory.
All sing the joyful chorus,
As her colors we unfold;
Then hurrah for California,
And for the Blue and Gold.

(shouted verse, accompanied by percussion instruments)

C---
A---
L---
I---
F-O-R-
N-I-A-
CALIFORNIA
CALIFORNIA
CALI-FORRRRRRRRR-NIA!

We’ll yell for California,
Dear Mother of us all.
We’ll fight for California
Till the crimson banners fall.
And raise the joyful chorus,
As her colors we unfold.
For we’ll win for California,
And for the Blue and Gold.

We're Sons of California
Fair mistress of the sea;
And we'll win for California,
Her glorious destiny.
Then raise the joyful chorus,
As her colors we unfold
For we'll win for California,
And for the Blue and Gold.

- Note: In each verse, the second and third "California's are sung as Cal-eee-for-knee-yuh.
