= Fight for California =

Fight song of University of California, Berkeley

"Fight for California" is the official fight song of the University of California, Berkeley. The tune is a march and is from the "trio" or final strain of the "Lights Out March" written by Earl Elleson McCoy in 1906. The lyrics were written by Robert N. Fitch of the class of 1909.

== Usage ==
Fight for California

Fight for California as part of the Lights Out March

The song is played whenever a California athlete enters the playing field at the beginning (or after halftime) of an athletic competition, or after a touchdown is scored in football. In football games, it is the final song played during the band's pre-game show, at which time the Cal Band marches from a concentric square formation into the script Cal.

The Cal Band typically plays the complete "Lights Out March" at the ending of a post-game concert for Cal sporting events that they attend.

== History ==
In 1984, during STS-41-C, NASA mission control woke up the shuttle crew with "Fight for California" in honor of Ox van Hoften, who graduated from Berkeley in 1966.
