= San Jose State Spartans =

Intercollegiate sports teams of San Jose State University

- University: San Jose State University
- Nickname: Spartans
- NCAA: Division I / FBS
- Conference: Mountain West Conference (primary); Mountain Pacific Sports Federation (beach volleyball); West Coast Conference (men's water polo); Golden Coast Conference (women's water polo)
- Athletic director: Jeff Konya
- Location: San Jose, California
- Varsity teams: 22
- Football stadium: CEFCU Stadium
- Basketball arena: Provident Credit Union Event Center
- Baseball stadium: Excite Ballpark
- Softball stadium: Spartan Softball Stadium
- Soccer stadium: Spartan Soccer Complex
- Aquatics center: Spartan Recreation and Aquatic Center
- Golf course: Pasatiempo Golf Club
- Tennis venue: Spartan Tennis Complex
- Outdoor track and field venue: PAL Stadium; Bud Winter Field (former)
- Volleyball arena: Yoshihiro Uchida Hall; Spartan Beach
- Other venues: Spartan Complex
- Colors: Gold, white, and blue
- Mascot: Sammy Spartan
- Fight song: Spartan Fight Song
- Website: sjsuspartans.com

Team NCAA championships
- 10

Individual and relay NCAA champions
- 50

The San Jose State Spartans are the intercollegiate athletic teams that represent San José State University. SJSU sports teams compete in the Mountain West Conference at the NCAA Division I level, with football competing in the Football Bowl Subdivision (FBS). SJSU has participated in athletics since it first fielded a baseball team in 1890.

San Jose State is one of 26 Division I institutions in the state of California, eight of which sponsor FBS football programs. The other FBS programs are Pac-12 members Fresno State and San Diego State, MAC member Sacramento State, ACC members University of California and Stanford, and B1G members UCLA and USC.

San José State sports teams have won NCAA national titles in track and field, cross country, golf, boxing, fencing and tennis. As of 2023, SJSU has won 10 NCAA national Division 1 team championships and produced 50 NCAA national Division 1 individual champions. SJSU also has achieved an international reputation for its judo program, winning 54 National Collegiate Judo Association (NCJA) men's team championship titles and 27 NCJA women's team championship titles between 1962 and 2026.

SJSU alumni have won 20 Olympic medals (including seven gold medals) dating back to the first gold medal won by Willie Steele in track and field in the 1948 Olympics. Alumni also have won medals in swimming, judo, water polo and boxing.

The track team coached by "Bud" Winter earned San Jose State the nickname "Speed City", and produced Olympic medalists and social activists Lee Evans, Tommie Smith and John Carlos. Smith and Carlos are perhaps best remembered for giving the raised fist salute from the medalists' podium during the 1968 Summer Olympics in Mexico City.

San José State University sponsors teams in eight men's and twelve women's NCAA sanctioned sports. Jeff Konya has served as the director of athletics since June 12, 2021.

== Nickname and mascot history ==
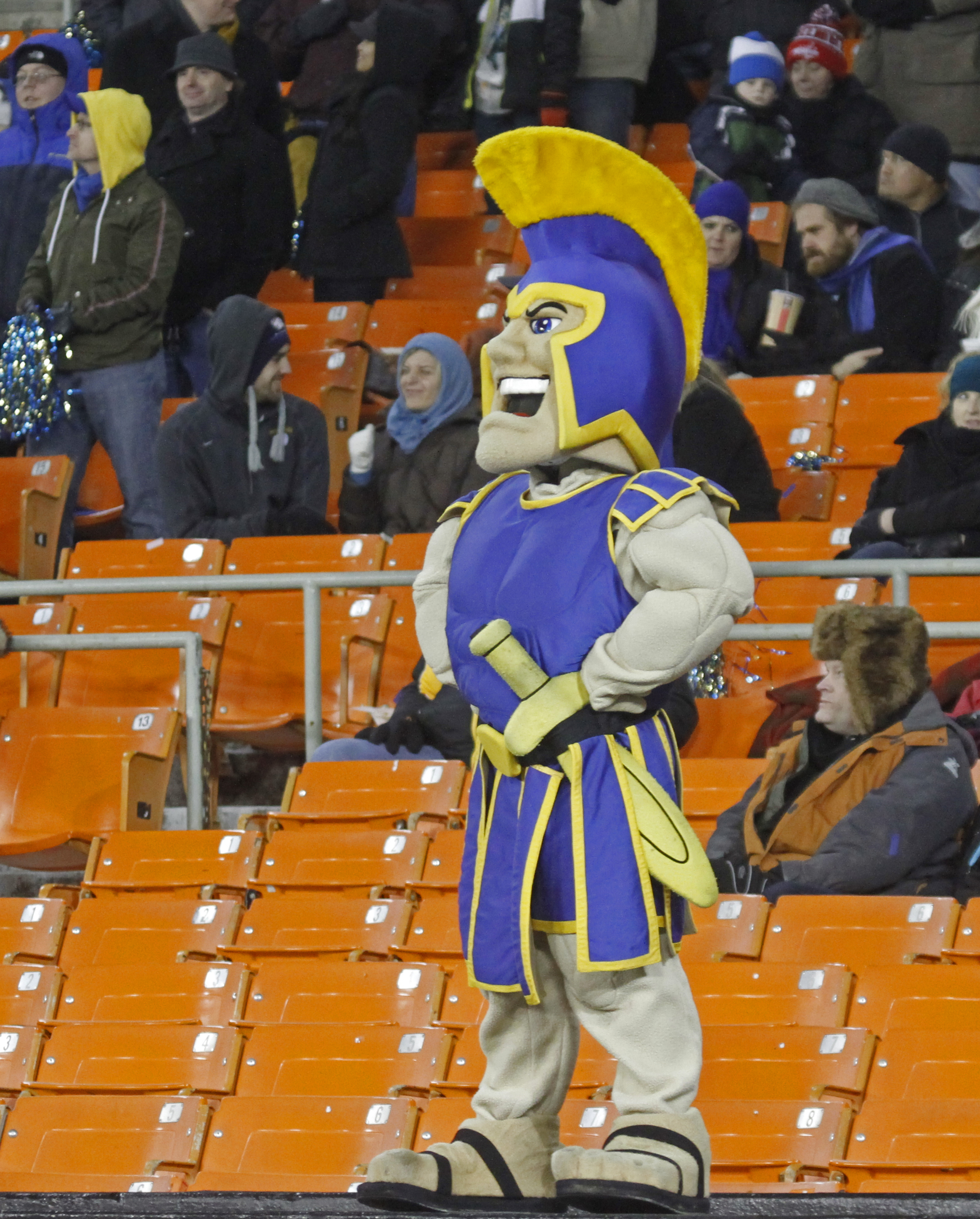
Sammy Spartan at the 2012 Military Bowl

SJSU's mascot changed many times before the school finally adopted the Spartans as the official mascot and nickname in 1922. Mascots and nicknames prior to 1922 included the Daniels, the Teachers, the Pedagogues, the Normals and the Normalites. The school's current mascot is Sammy the Spartan, or Sammy Spartan for short.

After 1887, the school's official name was the State Normal School at San Jose. The school's athletics teams initially played under the "Normal" identity, but they gradually shifted to the "State Normal School" identity, as evidenced by images of SNS football and basketball squads from this era. In official publications, the school was referred to as the "California State Normal School, San Jose."

== Sports sponsored ==
San Jose State is a member of the Mountain West Conference

Men's sports	Women's sports
Baseball	Basketball
Basketball	Beach volleyball
Cross country	Cross country
Football	Golf
Golf	Gymnastics
Soccer	Soccer
Track and field^{1}	Softball
Water polo	Swimming and diving
	Tennis
	Track and field^{1}
	Volleyball
	Water polo
^{1} – includes both indoor and outdoor

All varsity teams representing San José State University compete in the Mountain West Conference except beach volleyball, (Mountain Pacific Sports Federation), men's water polo (Golden Coast Conference), and women's water polo (Golden Coast Conference).

=== Baseball ===
The Spartan baseball team made NCAA tournament appearances in 1955, 1971, 2000, 2002 and 2023. In 2000, the team advanced to the College World Series.

From 1997 to 2013, the SJSU baseball team competed in the Western Athletic Conference, earning three WAC pennants in 1997, 2000 and 2009. In 2023, the SJSU baseball team won both the Mountain West Conference regular-season title and tournament championship title.

Under head coach and SJSU alumnus Sam Piraro (1987–2012), the SJSU baseball team reached the 30-win mark 17 times (including five 40+ wins seasons) and appeared in the national rankings 47 times.

As of 2023, the SJSU baseball team has produced over 25 All-Americans including seven first-team selections.

Over 100 Spartans have been taken in the Major League Baseball draft since 1965.

=== Basketball ===
The SJSU men's basketball team has garnered 10 conference championship titles beginning with a California Coast Conference championship victory in 1925. The Spartans' most recent conference championship victory occurred in 1996 when SJSU defeated Utah State in overtime to win the Big West championship tournament.

The SJSU men's basketball team has made three NCAA tournament appearances (1951, 1980 and 1996). SJSU was defeated in the first round all three times. The SJSU men's basketball team has made one National Invitation Tournament (NIT) appearance (1981), but was defeated in the first round. The SJSU men's basketball team has made two College Basketball Invitational (CBI) tournament appearances (2011 and 2023).

As of 2023, twelve former SJSU men's basketball players have been drafted into the NBA.

San Jose State began fielding a varsity women's basketball team in 1974.

=== Cross country ===
In 1962, the San José State University cross country team became the first racially integrated team to win the NCAA national championship.

The San Jose State men's cross country team has appeared in the NCAA tournament six times, finishing first in 1962 and 1963. The team has compiled an unofficial record of 84–19 (.816).

The San Jose State women's cross country team has never made the NCAA tournament.

Year	Ranking	Points	Notes
1961	No. 2	82	Defeated Houston, Kansas, Iowa, Western Michigan, Southern Illinois, Penn State, Michigan State, Air Force, Army, Texas A&M, Central Michigan, Ohio, Miami (OH), Bowling Green, and Buffalo; Lost to Oregon State
1962	No. 1	58	Defeated Villanova, Western Michigan, Houston, Michigan State, Ohio, Colorado, Oregon State, Idaho, Kansas, Notre Dame, Penn State, Iowa, and Texas A&M
1963	No. 1	53	Defeated Oregon, Notre Dame, Kansas, Michigan State, Houston, Ohio, Miami (OH), Villanova, Western Michigan, Wisconsin, Brown, Bowling Green, Providence, Syracuse, Drake, William & Mary, Rutgers, Oklahoma City, North Carolina, and Virginia Tech
1965	No. 11	277	Defeated BYU, Furman, Colorado, Michigan State, Army, Providence, and Houston; Lost to Western Michigan, Northwestern, Tennessee, Georgetown, Oklahoma State, Kansas, Kansas State, Oregon, Notre Dame, and Wyoming
1966	No. 3	183	Defeated Iowa, Washington State, Colorado, Oregon State, Southern Illinois, Western Michigan, Houston, New Mexico, Michigan State. Colorado State, Abilene Christian, Ohio, Kansas, Oklahoma State, William & Mary, Miami (OH), Providence, Notre Dame, Drake, Iowa State, Tennessee, and Arkansas; Lost to Villanova and Kansas State
1967	No. 7	152	Defeated Drake, BYU, Utah, Houston, Tennessee, Kansas, and Wyoming; Lost to Villanova, Air Force, Colorado, Western Michigan, Indiana, and Missouri

=== Football ===
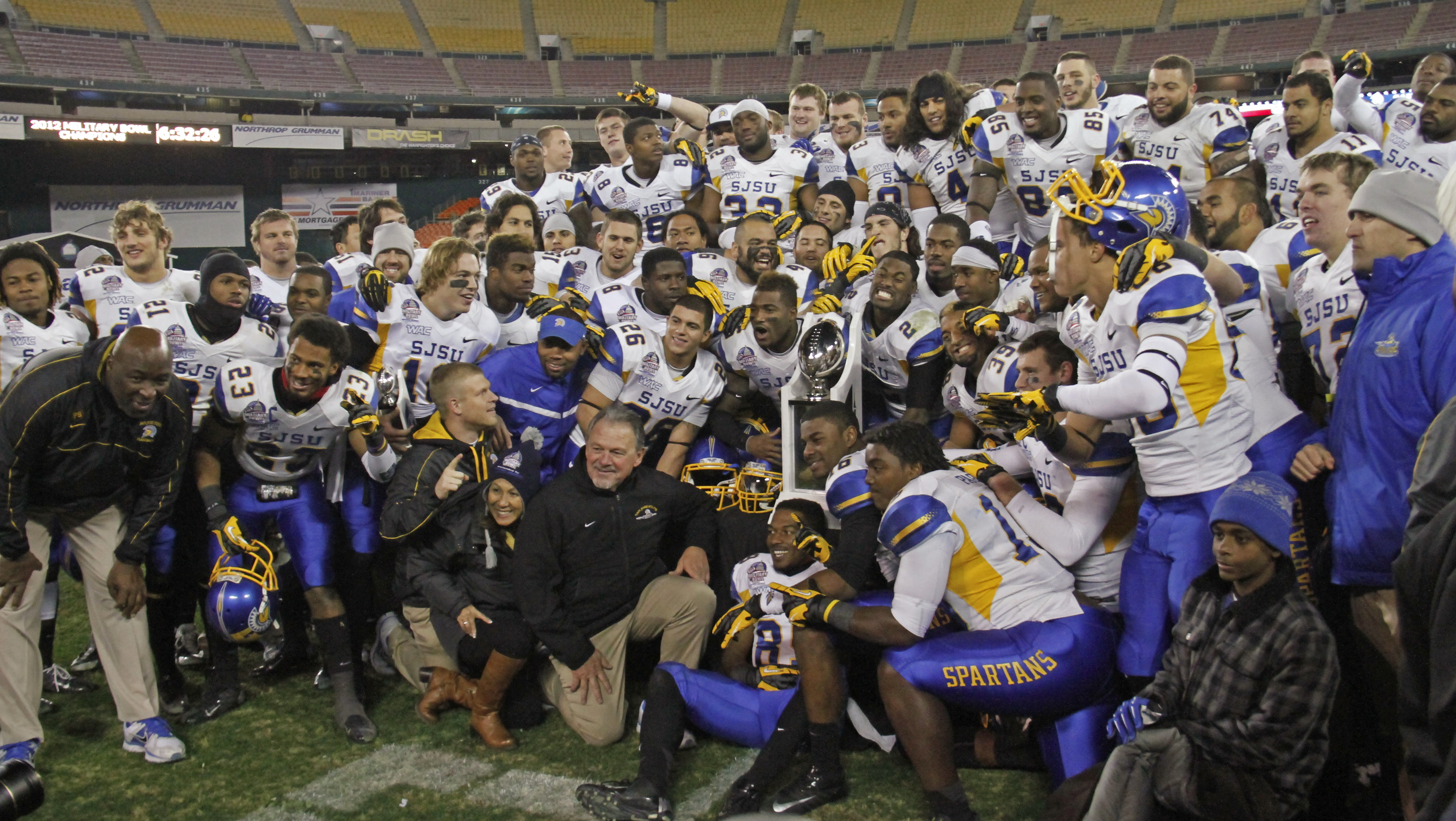
The Spartans football team poses with the trophy at the 2012 Military Bowl

San Jose State first fielded a football team in 1893 and has won 17 conference championships dating back to 1932. During the 1930s and 1940s, the Spartan football program was considered a powerhouse, winning eight conference championships over an 18-year span. The 1932 team finished 7–0–2 and the 1939 team finished 13–0, marking the only undefeated seasons in school history.

More recent success includes an 11–2 finish in 2012 when SJSU achieved its first-ever BCS ranking and first national ranking since 1990. SJSU was ranked No. 21 in both the 2012 post-season Associated Press Poll and the USA Today Coaches Poll.

The football team had another successful season in 2020 when it cracked the AP Poll top-25 for the first time since 2012 and appeared in the College Football Playoff ranking at No. 24. The team also won its first conference championship title since 1991. The Spartans finished the 2020 season 7–1 and ranked No. 24 in the final AP poll.

The San Jose State Spartans football team served unexpectedly with the Honolulu Police Department during World War II. The team had just arrived in Honolulu to play the University of Hawaiʻi at Mānoa in the Shrine Bowl, but was stranded on the islands after the Pearl Harbor attack.

SJSU earned more Big West Conference football championship titles than any other team in the history of the Big West conference.

The SJSU football team has made 12 bowl appearances. Its most recent bowl appearance occurred in 2022 when the Spartans faced Eastern Michigan in the Famous Idaho Potato Bowl in Boise, Idaho.

SJSU, the University of Dayton, Eastern Illinois University and the University of Arkansas are the only schools known to have produced two alumni who would go on to serve as head coaches of Super Bowl-winning teams.

SJSU has produced over 70 All-America team members, including five first-team selections.

As of July 2023, 143 San Jose State players have gone on to play in the NFL, and eight former Spartans are actively playing in the NFL. The 143 players include 125 draftees, six NFL Pro Bowl selections, six first-round draft picks, two MVP award winners, and one NFL Rookie of the Year.

San Jose State has appeared in 14 bowl games and has an overall bowl record of 7–7.

Season	Coach	Bowl	Opponent	Result
1946	Bill Hubbard	Raisin Bowl	Utah State	W 20–0
1949	Bill Hubbard	Raisin Bowl	Texas Tech	W 20–13
1971	Dewey King	Pasadena Bowl	Memphis State	L 9–28
1981	Jack Elway	California Bowl	Toledo	L 25–27
1986	Claude Gilbert	California Bowl	Miami (OH)	W 37–7
1987	Claude Gilbert	California Bowl	Eastern Michigan	L 27–30
1990	Terry Shea	California Bowl	Central Michigan	W 48–24
2006	Dick Tomey	New Mexico Bowl	New Mexico	W 20–12
2012	Mike MacIntyre	Military Bowl	Bowling Green	W 29–20
2015	Ron Caragher	Cure Bowl	Georgia State	W 27–16
2020	Brent Brennan	Arizona Bowl	Ball State	L 34–13
2022	Brent Brennan	Famous Idaho Potato Bowl	Eastern Michigan	L 27–41
2023	Brent Brennan	Hawaii Bowl	Coastal Carolina	L 14–24
2024	Ken Niumatalolo	Hawaii Bowl	South Florida	L 39–41^{(5OT)}

=== Golf ===
Men

The SJSU men's golf team has garnered one NCAA championship title (1948) and has produced two NCAA individual champions, Bob Harris in 1948 and Terry Small in 1964. The team has also won 10 conference championships dating back to 1968.

Conference Championships

- West Coast Conference (1): 1968
- Big West Conference (8): 1970, 1974, 1975, 1977, 1981, 1982, 1984, 1985
- Western Athletic Conference (1): 2012

The SJSU men's golf team has garnered 12 Western Intercollegiate tournament team championships and 12 individual Western Intercollegiate championships, thus earning its place as the winningest team in tournament history. The team has also produced 33 All-America team members (including four 1st-team members) and seven different PGA Tour winners.

Notable SJSU alumni include Arron Oberholser and Ken Venturi.

NCAA Men's Golf Championship Results

Year	Finish	Score
1947	4th	617
1948	1st	579
1949	5th	603
1950	21st	626
1955	6th	597
1956	15th	621
1957	8th	614
1959	17th	609
1963	11th	600
1964	4th	600
1965	7th	596
1966	2nd	586
1967	9th	599
1968	11th	1,184
1972	9th	1,200
1973	4th	1,170
1974	9th	1,194
1976	13th	1,197
1977	13th	1,241
1978	8th	1,181
1979	14th	1,234
1980	20th	914
1981	20th	894
1982	13th	1,176
1983	26th	910
1984	6th	1,162
1985	24th	916
1987	12th	1,199
1992	21st	587
1994	26th	595
1996	10th	1,220
1997	19th	590

Women

The SJSU women's golf team has garnered three NCAA championship titles (1987, 1989, 1992), 18 conference championships, and 37 All-America honors. The team has also produced one AIAW individual champion (Patty Sheehan in 1980) and one NCAA individual champion (Pat Hurst in 1989). The team's most recent conference championship victory came in 2022, when the Spartans won the Mountain West Conference tournament.

In 2022, the SJSU women's golf team won the NCAA Ann Arbor Regional title and finished 7th overall in the 2022 NCAA national tournament. SJSU golfer Natasha Andrea Oon finished 2nd overall on the D1 national tournament leaderboard. The 2022 women's golf team also finished No. 3 in the final NCAA national rankings.

Notable alumnae include Danielle Ammaccapane, Dana Dormann, Pat Hurst and Juli Inkster.

NCAA Women's Golf Championship Results

Year	Finish	Score
1982	13th	1,269
1984	17th	1,303
1985	8th	1,260
1986	8th	1,215
1987	1st	1,187
1988	6th	1,187
1989	1st	1,208
1990	4th	1,225
1991	2nd	1,197
1992	1st	1,171
1993	3rd	1,190
1994	3rd	1,220
1995	2nd	1,181
1996	2nd	1,240
1997	2nd	1,180
1999	17th	946
2000	15th	1,225
2001	17th	1,227
2010	23rd	1,218
2013	19th	1,209
2019	19th	938
2022	7th	1,181
2023	16th	882
2024	17th	892

In June 2017, the first phase of the Spartan Golf Complex was completed, which includes a 400-yard driving range, hitting positions for 80 golfers, as well as chipping and putting areas. Phase 2 of the facility is currently in the planning stages and is expected to include a clubhouse, locker rooms, meeting rooms and coaches' offices.

=== Indoor track and field ===
The San Jose State men's indoor track and field team appeared in the NCAA Division I national tournament six times, finishing as high as 3rd in 1969. In 2024, San Jose State women's indoor track and field sent two individuals to compete in three events. Emilia Sjöstrand finished as the NCAA runner-up in the triple jump.I n 2025, San Jose State women's indoor track and field sent two individuals to compete in the long jump and triple jump. Simone Johnson finished 8th and earned First-Team All-American honors — the third consecutive First-Team All-American recognition for San Jose State women's indoor track and field.

Year	Gender	Ranking	Points
1969	Men	No. 3	19 1/2
1977	Men	No. 21	4
1983	Men	No. 15	10
1984	Men	No. 19	9
1985	Men	No. 9	14
1987	Men	No. 13	10

=== Soccer ===
==== Men's ====
Men's soccer competes in the Western Athletic Conference through the 2025 season, after which the MW will add men's soccer with SJSU as one of the league's inaugural members.

The Spartans men's soccer team has made a total of 14 NCAA championship appearances dating back to 1963, and has an overall NCAA D1 tournament record of 7–14. The Spartans' most recent NCAA championship appearance occurred in 2003.

==== Women's ====
The SJSU women's soccer team won the Western Athletic Conference championship title in 2000, 2009 and 2010, and won the Mountain West Conference championship title in 2015, 2018 and 2022. The women's team has an NCAA Division I tournament record of 0–4 through four appearances.

NCAA Women's Soccer Tournament results

Year	Round	Opponent	Result
2000	First round	Stanford	L 1–4
2015	First round	Stanford	L 0–2
2018	First round	UCLA	L 0–5
2022	First round	Stanford	L 0–6

=== Softball ===
The SJSU Spartan softball team earned NCAA appearances in 1990, 1992, 2013, and 2017, and has an NCAA Division I tournament record of 1–8.

Phases one and two of the new SJSU Spartan softball complex were completed in 2018. As of 2023, the third and final phase is under construction and will add permanent bleachers, restrooms, a concession stand and press box. The final stadium will be an enclosed facility with seating for over 700.

NCAA Softball Tournament results

Year	Record	Win Percentage	Notes
1990	0–2	.000	Eliminated by California in No. 5 Regional
1992	0–2	.000	Eliminated by California in No. 4 Regional
2013	0–2	.000	Eliminated by San Diego State in Tempe Super Regional
2017	1–2	.333	Defeated CSU Fullerton in Round 1 of Los Angeles Super Regional. Eliminated by UCLA in Round 2

=== Tennis ===
The San Jose State women's tennis team won the Western Athletic Conference championship title in 2013, and made NCAA tournament appearances in 2013 and 2017. The team also won the Mountain West Conference championship title in 2017 and 2021.

San José State University opened a new tennis complex in July 2018. The state-of-the-art facility includes six competition courts with lighting, sound system, spectator seating and viewing areas, and a full scoreboard. The Spartan Tennis Complex also includes a seventh court, the Mubadala Stadium Court. The complex formerly hosted the San Jose State All-Comers Championship and currently hosts the Mubadala Silicon Valley Classic, a WTA Tour event, over nine days every August.

=== Volleyball ===
Since first being recognized as a varsity sport in 1974, The San Jose State women's volleyball team has made 12 NCAA Division I tournament appearances, with an 8–12 record. The team advanced to the final four in 1984. Beach volleyball was added as a spring semester sport in 2014, playing in the Southland Conference. The volleyball program has had 9 head coaches, the first being former Olympian Jane Ward. Craig Choate had the longest tenure, 14 years, and was the winningest coach; Dick Montgomery achieved the best win–loss record, 191–99 over 9 years, and was inducted into the Spartans Hall of Fame in 2000. Todd Kress became head coach in 2023. SJSU has had two volleyball All-Americans: Teri DeBusk in 1985 and Lisa Ice in 1986. Ice is also the only San Jose State athlete to win an NCAA Top Six Award.

In the 2024 season, the women's volleyball team received national attention after it became public as a result of a lawsuit against the NCAA that the team included a transgender player. Four Mountain West Conference teams and one non-conference opponent forfeited games against the Spartans, and an assistant coach was suspended after bringing a Title IX lawsuit against the university. After the Boise State declined to play them in the semifinal, the Spartans advanced on a bye to the conference final, where they were defeated by the Colorado State Rams.

=== Water polo ===
The San Jose State men's water polo team was a national powerhouse in the 1960s and '70s. The team won a national title in 1968, one year before the sport was officially recognized by the NCAA. The team would go on to finish in the top five nationally four times in the 1970s. In 1981, the school discontinued the program to comply with Title IX regulations, but the program was reinstated in 2015. The team has an NCAA Division I tournament record of 5-6 through six appearances and advanced to the national championship match in 1971 and '72.

National Men's Water Polo Championship Results (NCAA from 1969)

Year	Round	Opponent	Result
1968	First round Semifinals; National Championship	USC; UC Irvine; Cal State Long Beach	W 10–5; W 4–3 (OT); W 6–3
1970	First round Semifinals	Stanford; UCLA	W 9–7; L 4–7
1971	First round Semifinals; National Championship	Stanford; CSU Fullerton; UCLA	W 10–4; W 10–9; L 3–5
1972	First round Semifinals; National Championship	Loyola (IL); USC; UCLA	W 21–6; W 19–14; L 5–10
1973	First round	USC	L 5–7
2023	First round	USC	L 10–18
2025	First round	Fordham	L 9–13

== Club sports ==
In addition to its various NCAA Division I sports programs, San José State University has a very active club sports community consisting of approximately 25 sports and 50 teams. Many of the club sports teams are run and organized by students, although some of the more established teams employ full-time paid coaches and enjoy strong alumni support. The list of club sports active at SJSU includes:

Men's and women's archery, men's and women's badminton, baseball, men's and women's basketball, men's and women's bowling, men's and women's boxing, men's and women's cycling, dancesport, men's and women's dragon boat racing, esports, men's and women's fencing, men's and women's figure skating, men's and women's gymnastics, ACHA Division II and Division lll men's ice hockey, women's ice hockey, men's and women's judo, MCLA Division II men's lacrosse, women's lacrosse, mountain biking, men's and women's powerlifting, men's and women's quidditch, men's roller hockey, men's and women's rugby, salsa, men's and women's soccer, softball, men's and women's swimming, track and field, triathlon, ultimate Frisbee, men's and women's volleyball, men's and women's water polo, and men's and women's wrestling.

=== Hockey ===
Founded in 1990, the San Jose State men's ice hockey team garnered one PCHA Division ll championship (1992) and four PCHA Division l championship titles (1993, 1994, 1995 and 1997), before withdrawing from the PCHA and becoming an independent American Collegiate Hockey Association (ACHA) Division ll team in 1998. SJSU won one additional PCHA Division 1 title as a non-member in 2017.

In 1992, the team went undefeated, finishing the season with a 17–0 record. The team finished 26-1-1 (18-0-1 at home) in 2006, and went undefeated through 42 consecutive home games from 2004 to 2007.

The SJSU hockey team has qualified for the ACHA national championship tournament nine times, finishing as high as 10th in 2010. In 2011, SJSU hosted the ACHA national tournament. More recently, the team qualified for the Pac-8 tournament in 2019, 2020 and 2023.

The San Jose State men's ice hockey team posted 26 consecutive winning seasons from 1991 to 2017.

=== Judo ===
The San Jose State judo program was established in 1937 to help train police cadets. In 1940, sophomore biology major Yosh Uchida was hired as the student coach. The program was disbanded during World War II, and reestablished in 1946 upon Uchida's return to the college.

In the late 1940s and early 1950s, Uchida and University of California, Berkeley coach Henry Stone established rules to allow their students to compete with each other, including a weight class system. Uchida and Stone persuaded the Amateur Athletic Union to sanction judo as a sport, and San Jose State hosted the first AAU national championship in 1953.

In 1962, the Spartans won the inaugural National Collegiate Judo Championship. They would continue to dominate the event to the present day, winning 52 National Collegiate Judo Association (NCJA) men's team championship titles and 26 NCJA women's team championship titles between 1962 and 2024.

In 2005, SJSU alumnus and head coach Mike Swain announced the establishment of the Swain Scholarship, the first full athletic scholarship in judo at an American university. In 2008, the SJSU judo program was named one of six National Training Sites by USA Judo.

Notable SJSU Judoka

- Kevin Asano, silver medalist, 1988 Olympic Games
- Bobby Berland, silver medalist, 1984 Olympic Games
- Marti Malloy, bronze medalist, 2012 Olympic Games; silver medalist, 2013 World Championships
- Ben Nighthorse Campbell, gold medalist, 1963 Pan American Games
- Gerardo Padilla, gold medalist, 1979 and 1983 Pan American Games
- Mike Swain, bronze medalist, 1988 Olympic Games; gold medalist, 1987 World Championships (first American male to win World Championships); head coach, 1996 U.S. Olympic judo team
- Yosh Uchida, head coach 1964 United States Olympic Judo Team
- Joe Wanang, gold medalist, 1991 Pan American Games

=== Rugby ===
San Jose State Spartan Rugby was established in 1971 and competes in the Pacific Western Rugby Conference. The Pacific Western Rugby Conference plays at the Division 1AA level. The Spartans compete against Chico State, Fresno State, San Francisco State, Stanford University, UC Santa Cruz and University of Nevada. San Jose State competes for the USA Rugby National Championship in both 15's and in 7's.

In 2013, SJSU finished first in the conference in 7's competition. In 2023, SJSU defeated the University of South Florida 17–12 in a game between runner-up teams (in rugby terms, a bowl game) from D1AA conferences in California and Florida.

The SJSU women's rugby team went undefeated in 2021–2022, finishing a perfect 5–0 on the season. The team won the 2022 USA Rugby's Division II rugby sevens championship, defeating St. Mary's, 22–0.

=== Salsa ===
San Jose State's salsa team, "Spartan Mambo", was established in 2010 and competes at amateur and collegiate competitions across the country. Spartan Mambo holds two championship titles from the College Salsa Congress in 2011 and 2015 as well as the 2015 and 2016 Collegiate Salsa Open. Spartan Mambo also won the Collegiate Teams division at the 2013 World Latin Dance Cup.

=== Table tennis ===
The SJSU table tennis team regularly competes in National Collegiate Table Tennis Association tournaments. The San Jose State table tennis team rose to No. 4 in the national rankings and competed in the NCTTA national championship tournament in 2012. The team was led by Truong Tu and reached the semifinals.

== Discontinued ==
=== Wrestling ===
Wrestling has a history at San José State University dating back to the early 1930s, although SJSU has not sponsored a Division 1 wrestling program since the 1988 season. Eddie Baza is one of three two-time All-America wrestlers in San Jose State University history and was inducted into the Spartan Sports Hall of Fame in 2005.

== Championships ==
=== NCAA championship appearances ===
San José State University sports teams have competed in NCAA national tournaments across 15 active sports (8 men's and 7 women's) over 170 times at the topmost level.

Men's (110)

- Baseball (5): 1955, 1971, 2000, 2002, 2023
- Basketball (3): 1951, 1980, 1996
- Cross country (6): 1961, 1962, 1963, 1965, 1966, 1967
- Golf (32): 1947, 1948, 1949, 1950, 1955, 1956, 1957, 1959, 1963, 1964, 1965, 1966, 1967, 1968, 1972, 1973, 1974, 1976, 1977, 1978, 1979, 1980, 1981, 1982, 1983, 1984, 1985, 1987, 1992, 1994, 1996, 1997
- Soccer (14): 1963, 1964, 1966, 1967, 1968, 1969, 1970, 1971, 1972, 1974, 1976, 1998, 2000, 2003
- Indoor track and field (6): 1969, 1977, 1983, 1984, 1985, 1987
- Outdoor track and field (39): 1934, 1937, 1938, 1946, 1947, 1948, 1949, 1950, 1951, 1952, 1953, 1956, 1957, 1958, 1959, 1960, 1961, 1962, 1963, 1964, 1965, 1966, 1967, 1968, 1969, 1971, 1973, 1975, 1976, 1977, 1978, 1979, 1980, 1981, 1982, 1983, 1984, 1985, 1986, 2024, 2025
- Water polo (5): 1970, 1971, 1972, 1973, 2023

Women's (60)

- Golf (23): 1982, 1984, 1985, 1986, 1987, 1988, 1989, 1990, 1991, 1992, 1993, 1994, 1995, 1996, 1997, 1999, 2000, 2001, 2010, 2013, 2019, 2022, 2023
- Gymnastics (9): 2003, 2006, 2008, 2009, 2011, 2012, 2014, 2022, 2023
- Soccer (4): 2000, 2015, 2018, 2022
- Softball (4): 1990, 1992, 2013, 2017
- Swimming and diving (7): 1984, 1985, 1986, 2006, 2008, 2012, 2015
- Tennis (3): 2013, 2017, 2021
- Indoor track and field (2): 2023, 2024, 2025
- Volleyball (12): 1982, 1983, 1984, 1985, 1986, 1987, 1988, 1989, 1990, 1998, 2000, 2001

=== NCAA team championships ===
The San José State Spartans have earned 10 NCAA national Division 1 team championship titles.

Men's (7)

- Boxing (3): 1958, 1959, 1960
- Cross country (2): 1962, 1963
- Golf (1): 1948
- Outdoor track and field (1): 1969

Women's (3)

- Golf (3): 1987, 1989, 1992

Results

NCAA Team Championships
School year	Sport	Opponent	Score
1947–48	Men's golf	LSU	579–588
1957–58	Boxing	Idaho State	33–21
1958–59	Boxing	Idaho State	24–22
1959–60	Boxing	Wisconsin	43–34
1962–63	Men's cross country	Villanova	58–69
1963–64	Men's cross country	Oregon	53–68
1968–69	Men's outdoor track and field	Kansas	48–45
1986–87	Women's golf	Furman	1,187–1,188
1988–89	Women's golf	Tulsa	1,208–1,209
1991–92	Women's golf	Arizona	1,171–1,175

=== National team championships not granted by the NCAA ===
Men's (55)

- Judo (54): 1962, 1963, 1964, 1965, 1966, 1967, 1968, 1969, 1970, 1971, 1972, 1973, 1974, 1975, 1976, 1977, 1978, 1979, 1980, 1981, 1982, 1983, 1986, 1987, 1989, 1990, 1991, 1992, 1993, 1994, 1995, 1996, 1997, 1998, 1999, 2000, 2001, 2002, 2003, 2005, 2006, 2007, 2008, 2009, 2012, 2013, 2014, 2015, 2016, 2017, 2023, 2024, 2025, 2026 (NCJA)
- Water polo (1): 1968

Women's (34)

- Bowling (1): 1976 (USBC)
- Fencing (5): 1975, 1976, 1977, 1978, 1979 (NIWFA)
- Judo (27): 1978, 1989, 1990, 1991, 1992, 1993, 1995, 1996, 1998, 1999, 2001, 2002, 2003, 2005, 2006, 2007, 2008, 2009, 2010, 2013, 2016, 2017, 2018, 2019, 2022, 2023, 2026 (NCJA)
- Rugby 7s (1): 2022 (USA Rugby DII)

Co-ed (3)

- Flying (3): 1966, 1968, 1969 (NIFA)

=== NCAA individual championships ===
San Jose State has earned 50 NCAA national Division 1 individual championship titles.

NCAA Individual Championships
Order	School year	Athlete(s)	Sport	Source
1	1936–37	Lowell Todd	Men's outdoor track and field (Hammer Throw)	
2	1941–42	Dick Miyagawa	Boxing (127-pound weight class)	
3	1945–46	Robert Likins	Men's outdoor track and field (Javelin Throw)	
4	1946–47	Bob Harris	Men's golf	
5	1946–47	Robert Likins	Men's outdoor track and field (Javelin Throw)	
6	1948–49	Wayne Fontes	Boxing (155-pound weight class)	
7	1949–50	Mac Martinez	Boxing (125-pound weight class)	
8	1951–52	Chuck Adkins	Boxing (139-pound weight class)	
9	1951–52	Bob McMullen	Men's outdoor track and field (3,000-Meter Steeplechase)	
10	1951–52	Bill Priddy	Men's outdoor track and field (Pole Vault)	
11	1952–53	Mike Guerrero	Boxing (125-pound weight class)	
12	1952–53	Lang Stanley	Men's outdoor track and field (800-Meter Run)	
13	1954–55	Max Voshall	Boxing (165-pound weight class)	
14	1957–58	T.C. Chung	Boxing (112-pound weight class)	
15	1957–58	Archie Milton	Boxing (Heavyweight class)	
16	1957–58	Welvin Stroud	Boxing (139-pound weight class)	
17	1957–58	Bob Tafoya	Boxing (119 pound weight class)	
18	1958–59	Nick Akana	Boxing (132-pound weight class)	
19	1958–59	Ron Nichols	Boxing (119 pound weight class)	
20	1958–59	Ray Norton	Men's outdoor track and field (200-Meter Dash)	
21	1958–59	Whitney Reed	Men's tennis (Singles)	
22	1958–59	Errol Williams	Men's outdoor track and field (High Jump)	
23	1959–60	Stu Bartell	Boxing (165-pound weight class)	
24	1959–60	Charlie Clark	Men's outdoor track and field (3,000-Meter Steeplechase)	
25	1959–60	Steve Kubas	Boxing (139-pound weight class)	
26	1959–60	Archie Milton	Boxing (Heavyweight class)	
27	1959–60	Dave Nelson	Boxing (125-pound weight class)	
28	1959–60	Ron Nichols	Boxing (119 pound weight class)	
29	1960–61	Dick Gear	Men's outdoor track and field (Pole Vault)	
30	1963–64	Terry Small	Men's golf	
31	1963–64	Danny Murphy	Men's outdoor track and field (10,000-Meter Run)	
32	1964–65	Wayne Hermen; Lloyd Murad; Maurice Compton; Tommie Smith	Men's outdoor track and field (4x100-Meter Relay)	
33	1965–66	Craig Fergus	Men's outdoor track and field (Triple Jump)	
34	1966–67	Tommie Smith	Men's outdoor track and field (200-Meter Dash)	
35	1967–68	Lee Evans	Men's outdoor track and field (400-Meter Dash)	
36	1968–69	Sam Davis; Kirk Clayton; Ronnie Ray Smith; John Carlos	Men's outdoor track and field (4x100-Meter Relay)	
37	1968–69	John Carlos	Men's indoor track and field (55-Meter Dash)	
38	1968–69	John Carlos	Men's outdoor track and field (100-Meter Dash)	
39	1968–69	John Carlos	Men's outdoor track and field (200-Meter Dash)	
40	1974–75	Ron Livers	Men's outdoor track and field (Triple Jump)	
41	1975–76	Dedy Cooper	Men's outdoor track and field (110-Meter High Hurdles)	
42	1976–77	Ron Livers	Men's outdoor track and field (Triple Jump)	
43	1977–78	Ron Livers	Men's outdoor track and field (Triple Jump)	
44	1979–80	Curt Ransford	Men's outdoor track and field (Javelin Throw)	
45	1981–82	Joy Ellingson	Women's fencing (Foil)	
46	1981–82	Peter Schifrin	Men's fencing (Épée)	
47	1982–83	Felix Böhni	Men's indoor track and field (Pole Vault)	
48	1982–83	Felix Böhni	Men's outdoor track and field (Pole Vault)	
49	1986–87	Fred Schumacher	Men's indoor track and field (35-Pound Weight Throw)	
50	1988–89	Pat Hurst	Women's golf	

Patty Sheehan won the AIAW individual women's golf championship in 1980. Additionally, at the NCAA Division II level, San Jose State has garnered two individual NCAA titles.

== Rivals ==
=== Fresno State ===
San Jose State's biggest rival is California State University, Fresno, due in large part to the two schools' geographic proximity and long history of competing in the same conferences. Fresno State is San Jose State's most-played opponent in the Mountain West Conference for college football and college basketball. Fresno State and San Jose State first started playing each other as members of the California Coast Conference in the 1920s.

=== Stanford ===
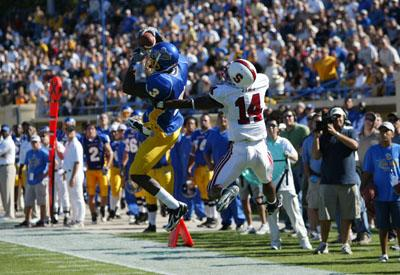
James Jones catches a touchdown pass against Stanford in the 2006 Bill Walsh Legacy Game.

San Jose State also has a natural athletics rivalry with the Stanford Cardinal of Stanford University, due in large part to the two school's geographic proximity. The approximate physical distance between the two universities is 23 miles. Additionally, San Jose State and Stanford are each known for having a large alumni workforce presence in Silicon Valley. The two schools first played each other in football in 1900.

== Facilities ==
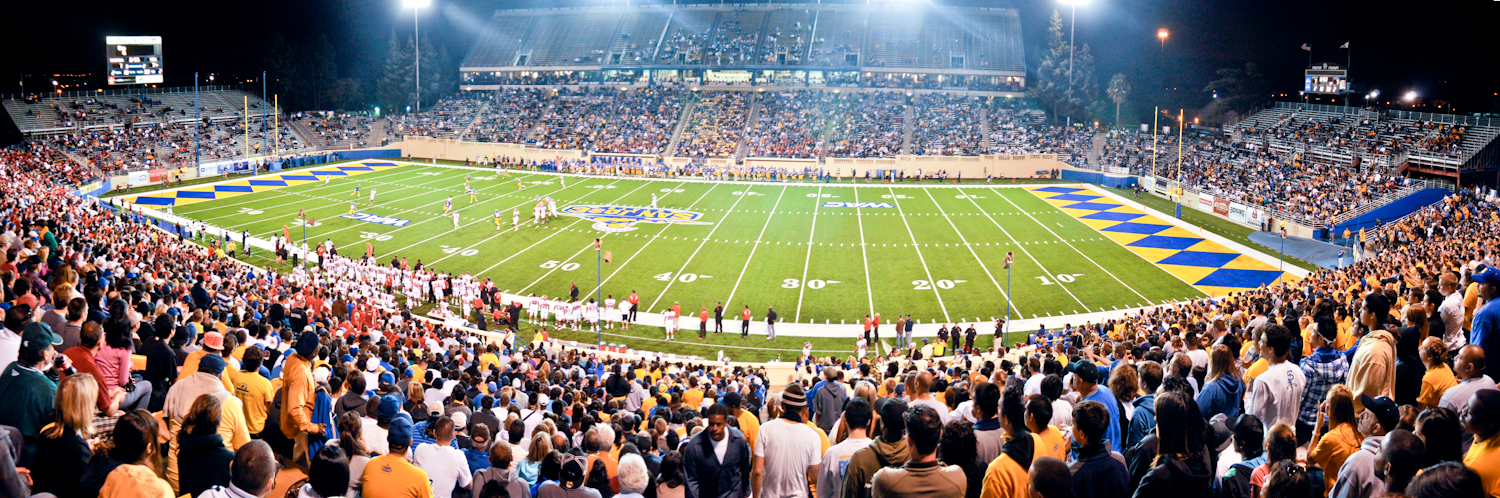
Utah vs. San Jose State at Spartan Stadium (2009)

The Provident Credit Union Event Center, Spartan Complex, and Spartan Recreation and Aquatic Center (SRAC) are the principal sports facilities for athletes on the main campus. Additional athletics facilities, including CEFCU Stadium (formerly known as Spartan Stadium), administrative offices, and multiple training and practice facilities, are located on SJSU's 62-acre (25.1 ha) south campus approximately 1.5 miles (2.4 kilometres) south of the main campus.

A CEFCU Stadium east-side building addition is currently under construction at a projected cost of $57.6 million. Known as the Spartan Athletics Center (SAC), the 55,000 square feet (5,100 m^{2}), multi-story facility will house a new football operations center, locker rooms, offices, meeting and training rooms and a sports medicine center. The facility will also include soccer team offices and locker rooms, as well as dining and hospitality facilities, event spaces and premium football viewing areas. Along with construction of the SAC, a major renovation of the stadium's entire east side is currently underway.

The east-side stadium renovation has temporarily reduced seating capacity at CEFCU Stadium from just over 30,000 to 21,520. Approximately 9,000 seats were removed from the stadium in 2019 to make way for the new building. This includes virtually all of the east-side stadium seating and some of the north end zone bleachers. The north end zone bleachers were removed to make way for construction of a new state-of-the-art video scoreboard and outdoor bar and lounge area. Installation of the new video scoreboard was completed in 2021 at an approximate cost of $5.2 million. SAC construction and remaining east and north-side stadium renovations are projected to be completed in August 2023.

In April 2014, a new $76 million south campus development plan was unveiled. The plan was later revised and the estimated cost was increased to $150 million including the cost of the new football stadium addition. The plan calls for construction of a golf training facility, new baseball and softball stadiums, new outdoor recreation and intramural facility, new soccer and tennis facilities, three beach volleyball courts, a new multilevel parking garage, and a new track and field facility.

The new golf, soccer, and tennis facilities opened in 2017. The new softball facility opened in 2018, and the beach volleyball courts were completed in 2019. The new outdoor recreation and intramural facility and parking garage were completed in 2021. The first phase of a new baseball facility was also completed in 2021. In October 2022, university officials announced they had secured $9 million in funding for a new $25 million, joint-use track and field facility to be constructed approximately 1.7 miles (2.7 kilometres) southeast of CEFCU stadium on the site of the Santa Clara County Fairgrounds. In 2023, new bleachers and a press box were added to the new soccer facility.

As of spring 2023, remaining south campus projects include the third and final phase of the new softball stadium, the second phase of the new golf facility, and the second phase of the baseball facility.

The third and final phase of the softball stadium will add permanent bleachers, restrooms, a concession stand, and a press box. The stadium will be an enclosed facility with seating for over 700. The second phase of the new golf facility is expected to include a clubhouse, locker rooms, meeting rooms, and coaches' offices. The second phase of the new baseball facility will add stadium seating, restrooms, a concession stand, and a press box.

In August 2015, a $55 million renovation of the Spartan Complex was completed. Located on the main SJSU campus, the Spartan Complex houses open recreation spaces, gymnasia, an indoor aquatics center, the kinesiology department, weight rooms, locker rooms, dance and judo studios, and other classroom spaces. The primary project objectives were to upgrade the structures to make them compliant with building codes, correct ADA deficiencies, correct fire safety deficiencies, and expand and modify existing structures.

The new Spartan Recreation and Aquatic Center (SRAC) was completed in 2019. At a cost of $132 million, the new facility houses a gymnasium, weight and fitness center, exercise rooms, rock climbing wall, sports club organizations, and competition and recreation pools with support spaces. The new facility is located on the main campus at the corner of 7th Street and San Carlos.

=== Main Campus ===
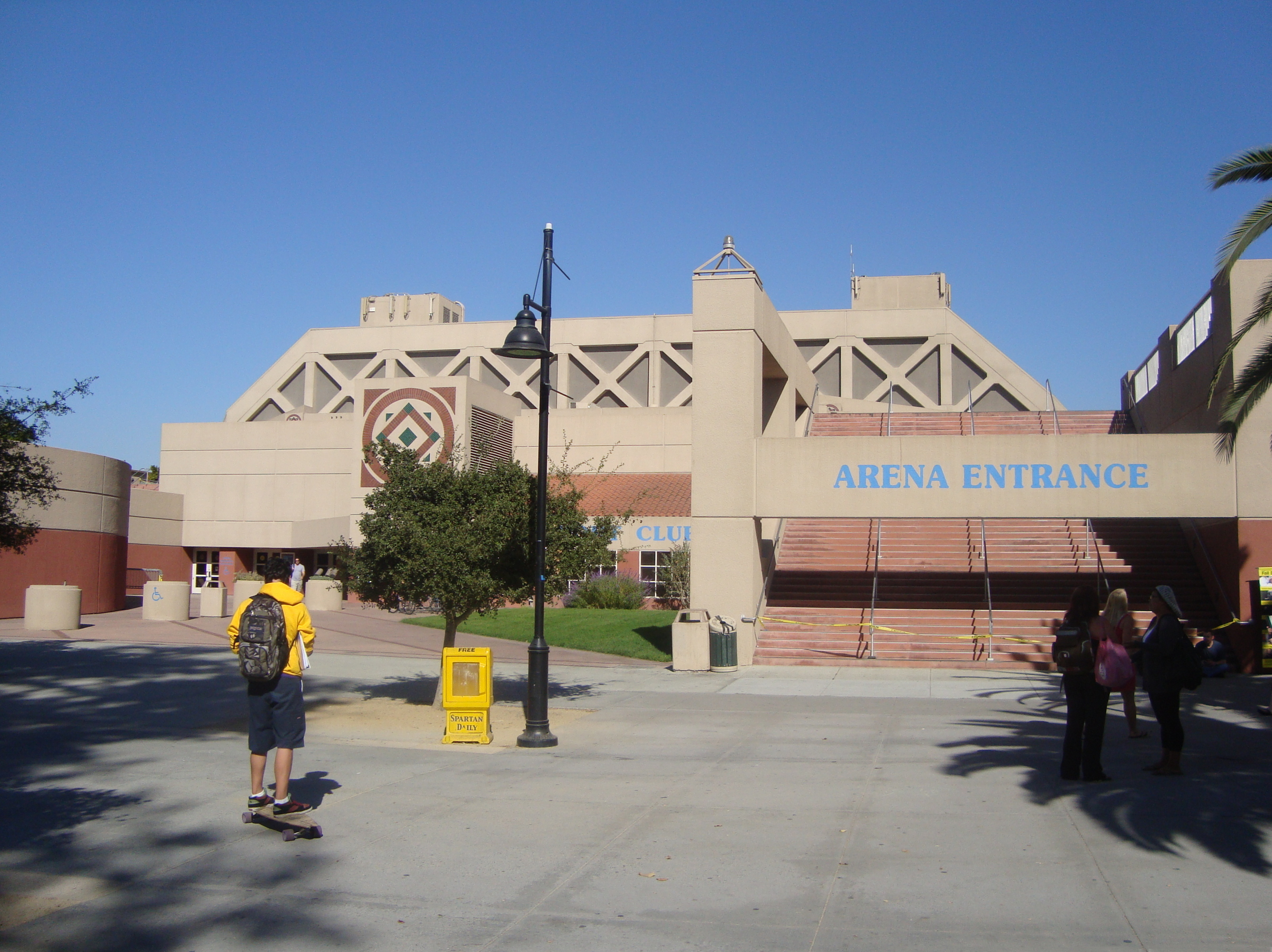
- The Provident Credit Union Event Center hosts basketball games and gymnastics meets.
  Provident Credit Union Event Center — men's and women's basketball, women's gymnastics
- Spartan Complex — women's gymnastics, women's volleyball, club judo
- Spartan Recreation and Aquatic Center (SRAC) — women's swimming and diving, men's and women's water polo

=== South Campus ===
- CEFCU Stadium — football
- Spartan Baseball Practice Facility — baseball
- Spartan Beach — women's beach volleyball
- Spartan Golf Complex — men's and women's golf (practice facility)
- Spartan Soccer Complex — men's and women's soccer
- Spartan Softball Stadium — softball
- Spartan Tennis Complex — women's tennis

=== Off Campus ===
- Excite Ballpark — baseball (adjacent to SJSU south campus)
- Pasatiempo Golf Club, San Jose Country Club, Cinnabar Hills Golf Club, and Almaden Country Club — men's and women's golf
- Sharks Ice San Jose — men's club hockey (adjacent to SJSU south campus)
- Spartan Beach — women's beach volleyball

=== Former facilities ===
- Aquatic Center — women's swimming and diving (demolished in 2017)
- Blethen Field — baseball (demolished in 2016)
- Bud Winter Field — track and field (demolished in 2019)

== Spartan Sports Hall of Fame ==
Athletes are elected to the San José State University Sports Hall of Fame by a committee vote. The hall of fame includes over 300 former players and coaches, and is displayed in the Jeff Garcia Hall of Champions, located in the Koret Athletic Training Center just north of CEFCU Stadium.

Sport	Hall of Fame members
Baseball	Johnny Allen, Al Ariza, Jeff Ball, Tony Biondi, Lefty Blethen, Eric Booker, Dick Brady, Ken Caminiti, Mark Carroll, Jerry Clifford, Tom Corder, Gary Cunningham, Tim Day, Jay Fike, Kevin Frandsen, Dean Giles, Jeff Gingrich, Rich Guardino, Tuck Halsey, Dave Imwalle, Elmer Johnson, Randy Johnson, Mark Kettmann, Hal Kolstad, Rick Lane, Mark Langston, Awbrey Laws, Tom Maloney, Lilio Marcucci, Larry McEvoy, Walt McPherson, Gene Menges (coach), Pete Mesa, Aubrey Minter, Junior Morgan, Brian Nakamoto, John Oldham, Clair Parkin, Chris Pedretti, Bob Pifferini, Bill Rahming, Jess Regli, Chuck Reynolds, Ralph Romero, Dario Simoni, Dennis Smith, Ed Sobcazk (coach), Anthony Telford, Dave Tellers, George Terry, Jim Visher, Bob Wuesthoff, Dave Zuniga
Men's basketball	Tariq Abdul-Wahad, Johnny Allen, Larry Arnerich, Dick Brady, George Clark, Bobby Crowe, Eddie Diaz, Coby Dietrick, Harry Edwards, Dean Giles, Hal Hawley, Darnell Hillman, Bill Hubbard, Chuck Hughes, Stu Inman, Gus Kotta, Awbrey Laws, Tom Maloney, Chris McNealy, Walt McPherson, Junior Morgan, Wally Rank, Jess Regli, Bert Robinson, Ralph Romero, S.T. Saffold, Lloyd Thomas, Carroll Williams, Billy Wilson, Bob Wuesthoff
Women's basketball	Lora Alexander, Elinor Banks, Sharon Chatman (coach), Karen Mason, Wanda Thompson
Boxing	Chuck Adkins, Nick Akana, Bob Anderson, Stu Bartell, Dick Bender, Don Camp, T.Chuck Adkins, Nick Akana, Peter Cisneros, Wayne Fontes, Steve Kubas, George Latka, Mac Martinez, Julius Menendez, Archie Milton, Dick Miyagawa, Dave Nelson, Ron Nichols, Dee Portal, Jack Scheberies, Jerry Stern, Welvin Stroud, Al Tafoya, Bob Tafoya, Max Voshall
Men's fencing	Mike D'Asaro (coach), Peter Schifrin
Women's fencing	Vinnie Bradford, Laurel Clark, Gay D'Asaro, Mike D'Asaro (coach), Joy Ellingson, Stacey Johnson
Field hockey	Jeannie Gilbert, Pommy Macfarlane, Sue Walker, Leta Walter
Football	Johnny Allen, Bob Amaral, Lynn Aplanalp, Luke Argilla, Stacey Bailey, Harry Beck, Keith Birlem, Kim Bokamper, Bob Bronzan, Mack Burton, Gill Byrd, Jim Cadile, Sheldon Canley, Doan Carmody, Al Cementina, Archie Chagonjian, Dave Chaney, Steve Clarkson, Sherman Cocroft, Dan Colchico, Barton Collins, Ken Cook, Steve DeBerg, Dud DeGroot (coach), Charles DeJurnett, David Diaz-Infante, Oscar Donahue, Leon Donohue, Harley Dow, Glenn "Pop" DuBose, Carl Ekern, Jack Elway, Jack Faulk, Wilson Faumuina, Chon Gallegos, Jeff Garcia, Claude Gilbert (coach), Charlie Hardy, Charley Harraway, Hal Hawley, Willie Heston, Roy Hiram, Danny Holman, Max Hooper, Bill Hubbard, Bud Hubbard, Chuck Hughes, Cass Jackson, Johnny Johnson, Sr., Cody Jones, Rick Kane, Tim Kearse, Craig Kimball, Bob Ladouceur, Awbrey Laws, Bill Lewis, Guy Liggins, Woody Linn, Tom Louderback, Dwight Lowery, Ed Luther, Morris Manoogian, Frank Manumaleuna, Lilio Marcucci, Larry Matthews, Walt McPherson, Gibby Mendonsa, Gene Menges, Aubrey Minter, Junior Morgan, Joe Nedney, Mark Nichols, Bud Nygren, Ray Overhouse, Carlton Peregoy, Mike Perez, Bob Pifferini, Art Powell, Jess Regli, Joe Rishwain, Walt Roberts, Bert Robinson, Gene Rocchi, Darryl Rogers (coach), Harry Russell, Jack Sarkisian, Al Saunders, Dee Shehtanian, Dario "Si" Simoni, Gerald Small, Willie Steele, Dick Stults, Tony Teresa, George Terry, Lloyd Thomas, Bob Titchenal, Joe Ulm, Dick Vermeil, Dick Voris, Stan Wacholz, Bill Walsh, Dave Wasick, Deoncé Whitaker, Hans Wiedenhoefer, Gerald Willhite, Billy Wilson, Wayne Womack, Jack Wool, Louie Wright, Herm Zetterquist, Leroy Zimmerman
Men's golf	Eli Bariteau, Bob Eastwood, Morgan Fottrell, Ernie George, Bob Harris, John Lotz, Jack Luceti, Mark Lye, Roger Maltbie, Arron Oberholser, Ross Randall, Terry Small, Ken Venturi, Jerry Vroom (coach), Mark Wiebe
Women's golf	Mark Gale (coach), Tracy Hanson, Pat Hurst, Juli Inkster, Dana Lofland, Janice Moodie, Patty Sheehan
Men's gymnastics	Ted Bogios, Rich Chew (coach), Tony Coppola, Irv Faria, Roy Palassou, Ron Phillips, Jim Turpin, Mickey Zavack
Women's gymnastics	Dani Albright, Kris Klepfer-Buchanan, Thomasina Wallace
Men's judo	Kevin Asano, Bob Berland, Mel Bruno, Howard Fish, Lyle Hunt, Daniel Kikuchi, Paul Maruyama, Keith Nakasone, Ben Nighthorse Campbell, John Sepulveda, Mike Swain, Yosh Uchida (player and coach)
Women's judo	Sandra Bacher, Liliko Ogasawara
Men's soccer	C. J. Brown Henry Comacho, Mani Hernandez, Dave Kingsley, Julius Menendez, Fred Nourzad, Ismael Perez, Art Romswinckel, Ken Spagnola, Gary St. Clair (player and coach), Ed Storch, Max Voshall, Jim Zylker
Women's soccer	Stacie Savage-Alberico, John Poch (assistant coach)
Softball	Sharon Cafini Niehoff, Gale Dean, Noleana Woodard
Men's swimming	Kevin Currlin, Jack Daly, Rich Donner, Bill Finch, George Haines, Steve Hoberg, Art Lambert, Tom Macedo, Pat McConnell, Ed Rudloff, Dick Threlfall, Bob Wegman, Howard Withycombe
Women's swimming	Laura Fritz, Lynn Vidali, Angie Wester
Men's tennis	Richard Anderson, Ronnie Edwards, Don Gale, Butch Krikorian (player and coach), Hank Pfister, Whitney Reed
Men's track and field	Ed Burke, John Carlos, Kirk Clayton, Dedy Cooper, Bobby Crowe, Sam Davis, Harry Edwards, Fred Estes, Lee Evans, Jeff Fishback, Lynn Greene, Hal Hawley, Gene Haynes, Chuck Hightower, Bill Hubbard, Don Hubbard, Dennis Johnson, Thelmo Knowles, Ed Kreyenhagen, Bob Likins, Woody Linn, Ron Livers, Mickey Maramonte, Mel Martin, George Mattos, Bob McMullen, Junior Morgan, Ray Norton, Ray Overhouse, Chris Papanicolaou, Bobby Poynter, Bill Priddy, Jess Regli, O.W. Rhodes, Walt Roberts, Lou Salvato, Ken Shackelford, Billy Smith, Ronnie Ray Smith, Tommie Smith, Lang Stanley, Willie Steele, Charlie Stith, Tony Sunzeri, Bob Talmadge, Lowell Todd, Ben Tucker, Ed Vasconcellos, Bud Winter (coach), Jack Wool, Billy Joe Wright, Herman Wyatt
Women's track and field	Margaret Jenkins
Women's volleyball	Teri DeBusk, Linda Ann Fournet-Sullivan, Joslynn Gallop, Lisa Ice, Dick Montgomery (coach), Sheila Silvaggio
Men's water polo	Dale Anderson, Rich Donner, Bill Finch, Bill Gerdts, Al Grass, Steve Hamann, Greg Hind, Brad Jackson, Bob Keeler, Art Lambert, Bob Likins, Jack Likins, Roger McCandless, Jim Monsees, Ed Rudloff, Howard Ruweler, Ed Samuels, Nort Thornton, Peter Ueberroth, Lee Walton (player and coach), Bruce Watson, Martin Wempe
Wrestling	Eddie Baza, Russ Camilleri, Dick Francis, Dave Hines, Wayne Jones, T.J. Kerr, Dan Kida, Loren Miller, Hugh Mumby, Martin Olivarri, Ken Spagnola, Frank Waxham, Hans Wiedenhoefer
Teams	1939 football, 1948 golf, 1958 boxing, 1959 boxing, 1960 boxing, 1962 men's cross country, 1963 men's cross country, 1969 men's track and field, 1986 football, 1987 women's golf, 1989 women's golf, 1992 women's golf, 2000 baseball
Legends	Bob Bronzan, George Haines, Juli Inkster, Walt McPherson, Julius Menendez, Yosh Uchida, Ken Venturi, Dick Vermeil, Bill Walsh
Administrators	Rich Chew, Lincoln Kimura, Carolyn Lewis, Joyce Malone, John Poch, Dr. Martin Trieb
Special	Krazy George Henderson, Alan Simpkins, Phyllis Simpkins
