= 1950–51 San Jose State Spartans men's basketball team =

American college basketball season

1950–51 San Jose State Spartans men's basketball
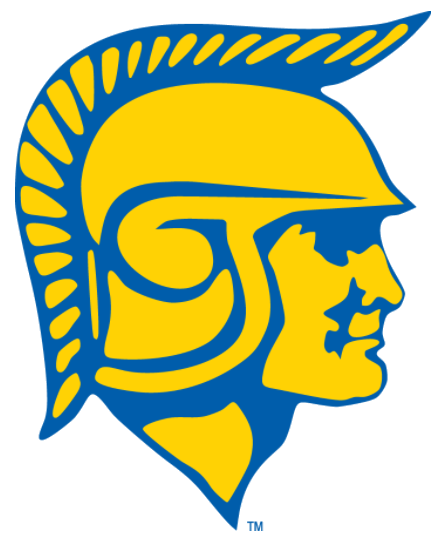

NCAA tournament, Sweet Sixteen
- Conference: Independent
- Record: 18–12
- Head coach: Walt McPherson (8th season)
- Assistant coach: Bob Wuesthoff (1st season)
- Home arena: Spartan Gym

The 1950–51 San Jose State Spartans men's basketball team represented San Jose State College during the 1950–51 NCAA Division I men's basketball season. The Spartans were led by eighth-year head coach Walt McPherson and played their home games at the Spartan Gym. SJSU played as an Independent.

The Spartans finished 18–12 overall. The Spartans were invited and participated in the 1951 NCAA basketball tournament, where they lost to BYU in Kansas City, Missouri in the Sweet Sixteen.

== Roster ==
1950–51 San José State Spartans roster
Name	#
Jack Avina	3
Mort Schorr	4
Bobby Crowe	5
Elmer Craig	6
Dean Giles	8
Ted Prescott	9
Orville Johnson	10
Lee Jensen	11
Aaron Seandel	12
Cornelius Barnes	13
Lee Deming	14
Bob Enzensperger	15
George Clark	16
Charles Crampton	17
Duane Baptiste	18
Carter Williams	19
Billy Wilson	20

Walt McPherson, alumnus of San José State, was the Spartans' head coach in 1950–51.

== Schedule ==
Date time, TV	Rank^{#}	Opponent^{#}	Result	Record	Site city, state
Regular Season
December 1, 1950*		San Francisco State	W 76–49	1–0	Spartan Gym; San Jose, CA
December 5, 1950*		at Stanford; Rivalry	L 49–59	1–1	Burnham Pavilion; Stanford, CA
December 9, 1950*		Sacramento State	W 51–46	2–1	Spartan Gym; San Jose, CA
December 12, 1950*		Fresno State; Rivalry	W 56–31	3–1	Spartan Gym; San Jose, CA
December 15, 1950*		UC Santa Barbara	W 45–38	4–1	Spartan Gym; San Jose, CA
December 16, 1950*		at No. 9 UCLA	L 59–62	4–2	Men's Gym; Los Angeles, CA
December 21, 1950*		Colorado	W 49–47	5–2	Spartan Gym; San Jose, CA
December 26, 1950*		at Wisconsin	L 59–75	5–3	Wisconsin Field House; Madison, WI
December 30, 1950*		at Manhattan	L 54–70	5–4	Draddy Gymnasium; New York, NY
January 2, 1951*		at Duquesne	L 57–74	5–5	Duquesne Gardens; Pittsburgh, PA
January 4, 1951*		at Beloit	L 57–86	5–6	The Sports Center; Beloit, WI
January 6, 1951*		at Hamline	L 47–58	5–7	Hutton Arena; Saint Paul, MN
January 11, 1951*		San Francisco YMI	W 48–46 ^{OT}	6–7	Spartan Gym; San Jose, CA
January 13, 1951*		vs. Santa Clara	W 55–50	7–7	The Swamp; San Francisco, CA
January 17, 1951*		at San Francisco State	W 62–60 ^{OT}	8–7	The Swamp; San Francisco, CA
January 19, 1951*		vs. San Francisco	L 43–54	8–8	The Swamp; San Francisco, CA
January 20, 1951*		vs. Saint Mary's	W 64–59	9–8	The Swamp; San Francisco, CA
January 23, 1951*		Stewart Chevrolet	L 45–55	9–9	Spartan Gym; San Jose, CA
January 25, 1951*		at Fresno State; Rivalry	W 85–42	10–9	College Gym; Fresno, CA
January 27, 1951*		No. 14 Arizona	L 55–62	10–10	Spartan Gym; San Jose, CA
January 30, 1951*		Cal Poly	W 59–54	11–10	Spartan Gym; San Jose, CA
February 7, 1951*		Saint Mary's	W 66–51	12–10	Spartan Gym; San Jose, CA
February 10, 1951*		Pacific	W 58–56	13–10	Spartan Gym; San Jose, CA
February 16, 1951*		vs. Santa Clara	L 55–63	13–11	Cow Palace; Daly City, CA
February 17, 1951*		vs. San Francisco	W 61–59	14–11	Cow Palace; Daly City, CA
February 20, 1951*		at Pacific	W 53–51	15–11	Stockton Memorial Civic Auditorium; Stockton, CA
February 23, 1951*		San Diego State	W 68–37	16–11	Spartan Gym; San Jose, CA
February 24, 1951*		San Diego State	W 50–46	17–11	Spartan Gym; San Jose, CA
February 27, 1951*		San Francisco	W 52–49 ^{OT}	18–11	Spartan Gym; San Jose, CA
NCAA tournament
March 22, 1951	(W 6)	vs. (W 2) No. 16 BYU; Sweet Sixteen	L 61–66	18–12	Municipal Auditorium; Kansas City, MO
*Non-conference game. ^{#}Rankings from AP Poll. (#) Tournament seedings in parentheses. All times are in Pacific Time.
