= Abe Alvarez =

American baseball player and coach (born 1982)

Long Beach State Dirtbags
- Starting pitcher / Coach
- Born: October 17, 1982 (age 44); Los Angeles, California, U.S.
- Batted: Left Threw: Left

MLB debut
- July 22, 2004, for the Boston Red Sox

Last MLB appearance
- May 21, 2006, for the Boston Red Sox

MLB statistics
- Win–loss record: 0–1
- Earned run average: 11.32
- Strikeouts: 5
- Stats at Baseball Reference

Teams
- Boston Red Sox (2004–2006)

Abraham Alvarez (born October 17, 1982) is an American baseball coach and former professional baseball pitcher, who is the pitching coach for the BYU Cougars. Alvarez played college baseball at Long Beach State University from 2001 to 2003 for head coaches Dave Snow and Mike Weathers and professionally in Major League Baseball (MLB) for the Boston Red Sox.

Alvarez has been legally blind in his left eye since infancy.

== College career ==
Alvarez, who is of Mexican American descent, attended Fontana High School and Long Beach State University, where he posted a 23–5 record with a 2.56 earned run average in three seasons. As a junior in 2003, he was named an All-American by Baseball America after going 11–2 with a 2.35 ERA in 18 starts. He returned to Long Beach State in 2010 to complete a bachelor's degree in history and served as the undergraduate assistant pitching coach for the university's baseball team.

== Minor league career ==
Signed by the Boston Red Sox in 2003 after being drafted 49th overall, Alvarez made his professional debut with the short-season Single-A Lowell Spinners. He posted no record and did not allow an earned run in 19 innings pitched over nine starts, struck out 19 and walked just two hitters. He limited opponents to a .138 batting average and did not walk a batter in his first six starts.

=== 2004 ===
In 2004, Alvarez was named Pitcher of the Year for Double-A Portland Sea Dogs after going 10–9 with a 3.59 ERA in 26 starts in his first full pro season. He limited opposite hitters to a .252 average, posted a 3.4 strikeout-to-walk ratio (108-to-32), and was also named to the Eastern League's mid-season All-Star team.

=== 2005 ===
In 2005, Alvarez started 26 games for the Triple-A Pawtucket Red Sox. He finished the year with a record of 11–6 and a 4.85 ERA. The left-hander surrendered 143 hits over 144.2 IP. He struck out 109 batters and walked 32.

=== 2006 ===
In 2006, Alvarez started 21 games for Triple-A Pawtucket. He had a losing record of 6–9 and a 5.64 ERA. He struck out 71 and walked 40 in 118 IP; he gave up 136 hits and 74 earned runs. His season was cut short by an ankle injury sustained off-field. Alvarez had surgery on the ankle on August 18, 2006, but was fully recovered by spring training.

=== 2008 ===
On May 12, 2008, Alvarez was released by the Red Sox. In June 2008, he signed with the Camden Riversharks of the independent Atlantic League, but was traded to the Long Island Ducks for outfielder Jamal Strong on June 6. On January 21, 2009, Alvarez signed with the Palfinger Reggio Emilia of Italy's Serie A1.

== Major league career ==
=== 2004 ===
The Red Sox summoned Alvarez on July 22, 2004, from Double-A Portland when a spot starter was needed for a doubleheader against the Baltimore Orioles. Alvarez allowed five runs on eight hits, two strikeouts, and five walks over five innings of an 8–3 loss. He was sent back to the minors after the game. He was the youngest member of the World Series champion 2004 Red Sox to receive a ring.

=== 2005 ===
On July 2, 2005, Boston placed reliever Matt Mantei on the 15-day disabled list with a left ankle ligament sprain and recalled Alvarez from Triple-A Pawtucket Red Sox. At the time of promotion, Alvarez was 7–3 with a 4.23 ERA in 16 starts for the PawSox, including wins in five of his past six decisions. He was expected to work out of Boston's bullpen, but was sent to Pawtucket the next day.

Boston designated reliever Mike Remlinger for assignment and recalled Alvarez on August 28, 2005. He pitched two games in relief, pitched 2 1/3 innings, and gave up four runs. He was sent down on August 30.

=== 2006 ===
On May 19, 2006, Boston placed reliever Mike Holtz was placed on the 15-day disabled list and recalled Alvarez from Pawtucket.

Alvarez pitched in relief on May 21, 2006. In three innings, he gave up five hits, four runs (all earned), two walks and he struck out two. He was optioned to Pawtucket the next day after David Riske came off the 15-day DL.

== Post-playing career ==
In 2010, after Alvarez retired from professional baseball, he returned to Long Beach State, where he worked toward a bachelor's degree in history and worked as an undergraduate assistant pitching coach. Alvarez was pitching coach at Cerritos High School and was the head coach at St. Bernard High School, which has won a share of the 2018 Santa Fe League championship. Alvarez in 2012 graduated from Long Beach State with a history degree. On July 19, 2022, he was named the pitching coach of the BYU Cougars.
