= Sandra McPherson =

American poet (born 1943)

- Born: Sandra Jean McPherson; August 2, 1943; San Jose, California, U.S.
- Died: August 20, 2024 (aged 81); Davis, California, U.S.
- Occupations: Professor; Poet

Academic background
- Education: San Jose State University (BA); University of Washington (PhD)

Sandra Jean McPherson (August 2, 1943 – August 20, 2024) was an American poet and professor.

== Early life and education ==
McPherson was born and raised in San Jose, California to parents Frances McPherson and, basketball coach and athletics administrator, Walt McPherson.

McPherson received her B.A. at San José State University and studied at the University of Washington, with Elizabeth Bishop and David Wagoner.

Carolyn Kizer, as editor of Poetry Northwest, published McPherson's first published poems.

== Teaching ==
She has taught at the Iowa Writer's Workshop, the Geraldine R. Dodge Poetry Festival, Haystack Portland State University, University of California, Berkeley Spring 1981 or 1982 as Roberta Holloway Visiting Lecturer, and the Art of the Wild Conference. She is a Professor Emerita at the University of California, Davis.

Having been a featured poet on the poetry circuits of Ohio, Kentucky, and Connecticut, she has also read in most states: Washington D.C., Louisiana, Georgia, Indiana, Utah, Texas, Iowa, Minnesota, Oklahoma, Oregon, Florida, Delaware, Virginia, Arkansas, Alabama, and California.

In 1979, Sandra McPherson visited the University of New Orleans with Tess Gallagher and Galway Kinnell through a grant from the National Endowment for the Arts.

== Works ==
- A Pumpkin at New Year’s, Poetry online
- Black Soap, Poetry (February 1980)
- Eschatology, Poetry (April 1970)
- For Elizabeth Bishop, Poetry online
- Grouse, Poetry (March 2006)
- Lions , Poetry online
- Peddler, Poetry online
- Resigning from a Job in a Defense Industry , Poetry online
- Seaweeds, Poetry (November 1972)
- The Delicacy, Poetry online
- Triolet, Poetry (July 1973)
- Pisces Child, Poetry365

=== Ploughshares ===
- A Vigil, 2 a.m., County Jail, Ploughshares (Spring 1999)
- In Her Image, Ploughshares (Spring 1999)
- Ridge Road, Ploughshares (Winter 1987)
- Sonnet for a Singer, Ploughshares (Winter 1987)

=== Books ===
- Elegies for the Hot Season, Indiana University Press (Bloomington), 1970. ISBN 9780912946924
- Radiation, Ecco Press (New York City), 1973. ISBN 9780912946047
- The Year of Our Birth, Ecco Press, 1978. ISBN 9780912946498
- Sensing, Meadow Press (San Francisco), 1980.
- Patron Happiness, Ecco Press, 1983.
- Pheasant Flower, Owl Creek Press (Missoula, MT), 1985.
- Floralia, illustrations by Claire Van Vliet, Janus Press (Portland, OR), 1985.
- Responsibility for Blue, Trilobite Press (Denton, TX), 1985.
- At the Grave of Hazel Hall, Ives Street Press (Sweden, ME), 1988.
- Streamers, Ecco Press, 1988.
- Designating Duet, Janus Press (West Burke, VT), 1989.
- The God of Indeterminacy, University of Illinois Press, 1993. ISBN 9780252062711
- Edge Effect: Trails and Portrayals, University Press of New England (Hanover, NH), 1996. ISBN 9780819522269
- The Spaces between Birds: Mother/Daughter Poems, 1967–1995, University Press of New England, 1996. ISBN 9780819572516
- Beauty in Use, Janus Press, 1997.
- "A Visit to Civilization", Wesleyan, 2002. ISBN 9780819565181
- "Handmade Definition of Obscurity", Janus, 2005 (a broadside).
- "Expectation Days", Illinois, 2007.
- "Certain Uncollected Poems", Ostrakon, 2012.
- "Outline Scribe", Ostrakon, 2015. ISBN 9781930454422
- "The Danger Is", Salmon Poetry Press, 2018
- The 5150 Poems, Nine Mile Press, 2022 ISBN 9781737788034
- Speech Crush, Gunpowder Press, 2023 ISBN 9781957062044
- Expectation Days. University of Illinois Press. 2023-12-11. ISBN 978-0-252-05602-4.

=== Editor ===
- Journey from Essex: Poems for John Clare, Graywolf Press (Port Townsend, WA), 1981.
- The Pushcart Prize XIV: Best of the Small Presses, 1989-90, (with Bill Henderson and Laura Jensen), Pushcart Press (Wainscott, NY), 1989.
- "Swan Scythe Press", (Davis, CA), founder and editor, 1999-2011.
- Poetry Editor, California Quarterly (1985-7).
- Poetry Editor, The Iowa Review (mid-1970s - 1980).
- Poetry Editor, Antioch Review (early 1980s).

== Honors ==
- Ingram Merrill Foundation grants
- National Endowment of the Arts fellowships
- Guggenheim Foundation Fellowship
- American Academy and Institute of Arts and Letters award

== Sources ==
- Novel Guide
