= 1967 NCAA University Division cross country championships =

1967 cross-country running meet of the NCAA (University Division)

1967 NCAA University Division Cross Country Championships
- Organisers: NCAA
- Edition: 29th
- Date: November 27, 1967
- Host city: Laramie, WY; University of Wyoming
- Venue: War Memorial Fieldhouse
- Distances: 6 miles (9.7 km)
- Participation: 112 athletes

The 1967 NCAA University Division Cross Country Championships were the 29th annual cross country meet to determine the team and individual national champions of men's collegiate cross country running in the United States. Held on November 27, 1967, the meet was hosted by the University of Wyoming at the War Memorial Fieldhouse in Laramie, Wyoming. The distance for this race was 6 miles (9.7 kilometers).

All NCAA University Division members were eligible to qualify for the meet. In total, 14 teams and 112 individual runners contested this championship.

The team national championship was retained by the Villanova Wildcats, their second title. The individual championship was also retained by Gerry Lindgren, from Washington State, with a time of 30:45.60.

== Men's title ==
- Distance: 6 miles (9.7 kilometers)

=== Team Result (Top 10) ===
Rank	Team	Points
1st place, gold medalist(s)	Villanova	91
2nd place, silver medalist(s)	Air Force	96
3rd place, bronze medalist(s)	Colorado	110
4	Western Michigan	126
5	Indiana	134
6	Missouri	148
7	San José State	152
8	Drake	164
9	BYU	216
10	Utah	244

== See also ==
- NCAA Men's Division II Cross Country Championship
