= Long Beach State Dirtbags baseball =

College baseball program

Long Beach State Dirtbags
- 2026 Long Beach State Dirtbags baseball team
- Founded: 1954
- University: California State University, Long Beach
- Head coach: T. J. Bruce (2nd season)
- Conference: Big West
- Location: Long Beach, California
- Home stadium: Blair Field (capacity: 3,342)
- Colors: Black and gold

College World Series appearances
- 1989, 1991, 1993, 1998

NCAA regional champions
- 1989, 1991, 1993, 1998, 2003, 2004, 2017

NCAA tournament appearances
- 1964, 1979, 1989, 1991, 1992, 1993, 1994, 1995, 1996, 1997, 1998, 1999, 2001, 2002, 2003, 2004, 2005, 2007, 2008, 2014, 2016, 2017

Conference regular season champions
- 1964, 1969, 1970, 1989, 1992, 1993, 1994, 1996, 1997, 2003, 2008, 2017

The Long Beach State Dirtbags baseball team is the college baseball program that represents California State University, Long Beach. Although all Long Beach State sports teams are officially known as the Beach, the baseball team is typically referred to as the "Dirtbags". Their colors are black and gold.

Long Beach State (LBSU) has competed since 1969 in the NCAA Division I Big West Conference (BWC), known at the time as the Pacific Coast Athletic Association. Before becoming a founding member of the PCAA, LBSU participated in the Division II California Collegiate Athletic Association (CCAA) from 1957 to 1969, and before that spent three years as an independent team.

The Long Beach State baseball team gained national prominence in 1989, with the hiring of Dave Snow as head coach. The Dirtbags established themselves as one of the strongest teams on the West Coast. From 2010 to present day, more active Major League professional ballplayers are alumni of Long Beach State than any other school.

Since 1993 the Dirtbags have played their home games exclusively at Blair Field, a semi-professional baseball facility located less than 2 miles (3.2 km) from campus and owned by the city of Long Beach.

== History ==
=== The McConnell era (1954–1959) ===
In 1954, then 5-year old Long Beach State College asked newly hired P.E. professor John McConnell (a former cross country runner also serving as the school's associate basketball coach) to be the first head coach of the new baseball team. Helming a program with only 14 players on the roster, no athletic scholarships, and a shoestring budget, the team was forced to hold practices on the public field at Whaley Park adjacent to campus. All of the team's first 11 games were played on the road; only towards the very end of the season, when the school's field was finally completed, could the 49ers host their first home game. The young 49ers posted a modest 3–13 record for the 1954 season.

1954 Long Beach State 49ers baseball team.

From 1955 to 1956, still hampered by a limited roster and forced to employ a 3-man pitching rotation, the 49ers posted significantly improved records of 17–4 and 18–6, respectively. They were paced by utility man Carl Evans, who would later become Long Beach State's first All-Conference player (after the school's admission to the CCAA).

In 1957 Long Beach State was admitted into the NCAA's College Division (now Division II) after three years of competition as an independent. McConnell remained as head of the baseball program for three more years, accumulating a 48–42 cumulative record in NCAA play and finishing between 3rd and 5th in the conference each year. After the 1959 season McConnell stepped down as coach of the Long Beach State baseball team, however he stayed on as a staff member in the P.E. department for nearly 30 more years. When asked later which accomplishment he was most proud of during his time with the baseball program, he responded it was that 50 of the 57 baseball players he coached graduated.

=== The Clegg era (1960–1963) ===
Dick Clegg took over the program after McConnell's departure, and almost immediately he appeared capable of taking the 49ers to heights that his predecessor had been unable to. Led by the team's first future Major Leaguer in pitcher Dick Nen, the 1960 team finished the season with a promising 20–14 overall record and a 9–6 mark in CCAA play for a third-place finish in the conference, and there seemed to be reason to hope that the future held even brighter things for the 49ers baseball program. But unfortunately Clegg was unable to reproduce the success of his first season with the club, and under his guidance the 49ers failed to garner another winning season. Clegg's teams accumulated a disappointing 32–65–1 record over the next three years, including an abysmal 6–25–1 record in 1963. This lack of production led to Clegg's resignation following the 1963 season.

=== The Wuesthoff era (1964–1969) ===
True success came when the program handed the reins to former freshman junior varsity coach, and assistant basketball coach Bob Wuesthoff in 1964. In Wuesthoff's first year as head coach, the 49ers rebounded impressively from the previous year's meltdown by going 31–13, earning the program's first conference championship and first entry into the NCAA National Tournament and setting a school record for wins that would stand until 1979 (The .704 winning percentage wouldn't be topped until 1989). This time, the first-year optimism did not give way to letdown.

Under Wuesthoff, the 49ers finished with a winning record in each of his six years as skipper at Long Beach State, accumulated a 161–101–4 (.613) overall record, and only once finished worse than third in the conference. By the time the 49ers won their second CCAA title in 1969, Wuesthoff was already the most successful coach in Long Beach State's short sports history. But changes came to the school in 1970, when Long Beach State was admitted to the NCAA's Division I. One of those changes came when Wuesthoff announced that he would not return for the 1970 season.

=== The Gonsalves era (1970–1988) ===
The 1970 season not only marked LBSU's first foray into NCAA Division I, it also marked the first hiring of a team alumni as head coach. Incoming skipper John Gonsalves had played second base for the team from 1964 to 1965, and even earned NCAA all-district honors his senior year. After a mildly distinguished 3-year career in the New York Mets minor league system (netting one selection to the class A New York – Penn League all-star team), Gonsalves returned to his alma mater to take over the reins from his former coach Bob Wuesthoff who was retiring.

At the beginning of LBSU's time in NCAA Division I, and for much of Gonsalves's time as head coach, the baseball program was afforded only 2 scholarships per year, significantly less than the NCAA maximum of 13. In addition, chronic underfunding of the program forced Gonsalves to split time between his coaching responsibilities and fund raising in order to meet his team's basic operating requirements. However, in his first year, despite the team's relatively uninspiring 29–23 overall record, Gonsalves led the team to an 11–4 record in conference play. This was enough to capture the first ever conference title of the newly formed Pacific Coast Athletic Association (PCAA), which sent the 49ers to the NCAA tournament. At season end, Gonsalves received the inaugural PCAA Coach of the Year award. Gonsalves would remain at the helm of the program for the next 19 seasons, and through two conference changes. The first came in 1977, when Long Beach State joined the upstart Southern California Baseball Association (SCBA), an NCAA Division I baseball-only conference consisting of baseball teams from schools that otherwise competed in either the PCAA or the WCC.

The 49ers posted their best year to date in 1979, when the 49ers compiled a 40–22–3 mark that set a new school record for wins and was good enough for a second-place finish in the competitive SCBA (behind Cal State Fullerton, who would go on to win their first national championship that year). They were paced by the team's first ever All-American selection, center fielder Rob Townley. Unfortunately, Gonsalves would never again coach a team to that level of success. Over the next 5 seasons, the 49ers only once posted a winning record or finished better than 4th in the conference. Even the demise of the SCBA and the renewal of PCAA competition (now known as the Big West) in 1985 couldn't change the fortunes of the hard luck 49ers, as they placed seventh in the conference in '85 and eighth in each of the next three years. Over his final 9 seasons, Gonsalves managed only a 205–342–10 cumulative record. After the 1988 season Gonsalves stepped down as head coach, citing physical exhaustion and a desire to spend more time with his family. Gonsalves remained on staff as a professor in the kinesiology department until 2002, and had his jersey number retired in 2001.

=== The Snow era (1989–2001) ===
Dave Snow was hired as head coach in 1989 after a successful four-year run at Loyola Marymount, where he had led the Lions to two WCC titles and their first ever CWS appearance. By contrast, Long Beach was coming off the worst stretch in program history, going a combined 66–163 over four seasons. Additionally, the team was being forced to play without the benefit a true home field, splitting games between Long Beach City College, Cerritos College, and Blair Field. (Ironically, the lack of a field ended up being a crucial ingredient in the creation of the team's iconic nickname – see below).

Snow set out with the aim of raising the program back to a competitive level. Unexpectedly, that year Snow wound up engineering the greatest single-season turnaround in NCAA history. Long Beach State exploded onto the college baseball scene by winning their first 18 games to start the 1989 season. Just one season removed from a 14–45 record, the reborn 49ers performed a complete turnaround by going 50–15 overall and winning their first conference title in two decades. In the NCAA tournament, the "Dirtbags" went undefeated in their Regional and reached the College World Series, a school first. Though they failed to win a game in the Series, the Dirtbags' improbable run earned Snow NCAA Coach of the Year honors (three years after having won the same award at LMU, making him the first repeat winner of the prestigious award).

The team suffered a regression in 1990, slipping to 4th in the conference and missing the postseason. But the following year Snow led the '91 team to a 46–19 record – good for a 2nd-place finish in the conference and an at-large bid to the NCAA tournament. The team again won their regional and advanced to their second College World Series, this time reaching the second round before being eliminated.

From 1992–'94 the Dirtbags won three consecutive Big West titles and reaching the College World Series yet again in '93, for their third CWS berth in five years. 1993 was arguably the Dirtbags' finest season, as the Dirtbags advanced farther in a postseason than ever before or since: 3 outs from a berth in the National Championship Game. After capturing the Big West Title and earning a top 10 ranking in all the major polls, the Dirtbags swept through their regional with four straight wins. In the College World Series, the Dirtbags eliminated Kansas and Texas A&M en route to a semifinal matchup with the LSU Tigers. LBSU and LSU each held one victory going into the rubber match of the series, and the Dirtbags played their way to a 5–3 lead going into the bottom of the ninth inning. But the Tigers used their final at-bats to mount a 3-run rally, eliminating the Dirtbags in dramatic fashion. The Tigers went on to dominate the National Championship Game, beating Wichita State 8–0 for their second national title.

Long Beach State reached the College World Series again in 1998, led by an offense that has been recognized as "the best offensive power in program history." Lefty Mike Gallo turned in a particularly memorable postseason performance, shutting out Big West tournament host Cal State Fullerton in a dominant complete game outing. The following week he again went the distance to stun regional host Stanford 5–1 in Palo Alto. After eliminating Alabama the next day to reach their fourth College World Series, the Dirtbags fought past Florida State and Miami to again reach the national semifinal round. There they were eliminated by Arizona State 14–4, again falling just short of the national title game.

An unexpected side effect of The Dirtbags' newfound success was the triggering of a regional rivalry between LBSU and established baseball powerhouse Cal State Fullerton, where Snow had previously spent 7 years as an assistant under Augie Garrido and had declined an offer to return as head coach in 1987 (during Snow's time at LMU). The two Cal States proceeded to dominate Southern California baseball: during Snow's 13-year tenure, the Dirtbags and the Titans won 12 of 13 Big West Championships (1 shared) and combined for 22 NCAA tournament appearances and 10 College World Series berths. (By way of comparison, traditional SoCal athletic powerhouses USC and UCLA combined for only 19 Tournament appearances and 6 CWS berths over the same period.) The Long Beach-Fullerton rivalry remains heated to this day.

Snow retired following the 2001 season for family reasons. In 13 years at LBSU, Snow compiled a record of 511–290–4 (.638 winning percentage), 6 Big West championships, 11 NCAA tournament appearances, and 4 College World Series berths, including 3rd-place finishes in 1993 and 1998 - he still holds the LBSU career coaching records in all the aforementioned categories. Snow also received more Big West Coach of the Year accolades (5) than any other coach in program history, and remains the only LBSU coach to be named NCAA Coach of the Year (1989).

=== The Weathers era (2002–2010) ===
Immediately after Snow's departure, LBSU athletic director Bill Shumard confirmed that Snow's longtime assistant Mike Weathers would take over as head coach. Weathers, who had known Snow since the pair's playing days at Cerritos College in the late 1960s, had previously served as head coach at Utah and Chapman College before spending the last 9 seasons working under Snow at LBSU. Having served as associate head coach the year before, the veteran Weathers sought to utilize his coaching experience to maintain the level of success that Snow had established before him.

In Weathers's first year after taking the reins from Snow, the Dirtbags didn't skip a beat as they cruised to a 39–21 overall record and an at-large bid to the NCAA tournament. This turned out to be the first of a seven-year run for the team, where from 2002 to 2008 the Dirtbags never finished worse than second in the conference and only once ended with fewer than 37 wins. Six of those 7 seasons also saw the Dirtbags earn a berth in the NCAA tournament.

A notable hallmark Weathers' tenure was the amount of Major League talent produced at Long Beach State. Because of the limited budget afforded to the state-funded school, the Dirtbags staff was often forced to focus on recruiting and developing prospects that were overlooked by other schools. One such case was Jered Weaver, who was dismissed by many scouts on the belief that he was more cut out for basketball than baseball. But Weaver's junior season in 2004 became the most decorated for a player in school history, netting him his second consecutive first team All-America selection while also winning (among other honors) the Dick Howser Trophy, the Roger Clemens Award, and the Golden Spikes Award.

Another example of prospect development was Evan Longoria, who (being widely regarded as too scrawny to compete for a Division 1 program) received no scholarship offers at all out of high school. Undeterred, Longoria enrolled at Rio Hondo Community College and played for one season, after which he was finally offered a scholarship at Long Beach State. Longoria would spend the next two seasons as the starting third baseman for the Dirtbags, and by the end of his junior year at LBSU, diligent hard work and expert instruction had transformed him into an imposing physical specimen who was described by various media outlets as the "top position player" and "best pure hitter" available in the 2006 draft. That year Longoria became the highest-drafted player in school history (3rd overall), which also marked the third straight year that Long Beach State had a player selected in the first round of the draft (Weaver went 12th in 2004, and Troy Tulowitzki 7th in 2005).

Perhaps predictably, the rivalry between the Dirtbags and the Cal State Fullerton Titans continued as heated as ever under Weathers; the annual season-ending series between the two teams more often than not decided the conference championship. From 2002 to 2008, the two rivals combined to win 6 more Big West titles (1 shared). In the 20 seasons from 1989 to 2008, 17 ended with either the Dirtbags or the Titans being crowned Big West champions.

Immediately after capturing the 2008 Big West title, the Dirtbags saw the conference power balance tip decidedly against them. It started in the off-season, when LBSU lost 11 players to the 2008 draft, making it the largest draft class in school history and one that featured several star contributors, including All-Americans Shane Peterson and Andrew Liebel. Ultimately the Dirtbags proved unable to compensate for such a mass exodus of talent, and they fell into a major slump as they skidded to a 25–29 overall record in 2009, their first losing record in over two decades. The team's funk deepened in 2010 as they finished 23–32, dead last in the Big West for the first time in 22 years. Also of note, the Dirtbags lost each of their 7 meetings with the arch-rival Titans over that two-year span.

On May 11, 2010 (two weeks before the close of the season), Weathers announced that he would be retiring at season's end. "There needed to be a change and new energy in the program, because it hasn't been going great the last couple years," Weathers said. "I've been doing this for 32 years, and so it's time. It can give somebody else a chance, and there's no hard feelings." Weathers was remembered by CSULB President F. King Alexander as "an outstanding leader of the program and a great representative of the university." Weathers left LBSU with the second-most conference championships and postseason appearances to his name, as well as the second-highest winning percentage in school history (all behind his predecessor and mentor Dave Snow). Weathers also had coached the most Big West Players/Pitchers of the Year (6) and the most future MLB draft picks (56) of any coach in school history at the time of his retirement.

Following Weathers's retirement announcement, the Dirtbags lost 9 of their last 10 games in 2010.

=== The Buckley era (2011–2019) ===
On June 1, 2010, two days after the close of the 2010 season, athletic director Vic Cegles held a press conference to formally introduce associate head coach Troy Buckley as LBSU's 7th head coach. A former professional player himself, Buckley first joined the Dirtbags' program as an assistant 2001, Dave Snow's final year as head coach. During his seven years as pitching coach he tutored seven future Major Leaguers including Abe Alvarez, Jason Vargas and 2004 National Player of the Year Jered Weaver. Buckley then spend two seasons serving as pitching coordinator for the Pittsburgh Pirates minor league system, before returning to LBSU in 2010 to take the position of associate head coach under Mike Weathers.

Following Weathers's retirement and his own promotion, Buckley promised to carry on the Dirtbag tradition. "We're still going to play a gritty type of baseball and hopefully show our fans that these guys don't quit. They fight and they grind and they get knocked down, but they keep coming back. We want to be fundamentally sound and not beat ourselves. We want to do things the right way." But while speaking highly of the program's legacy of fundamentally-sound baseball, Buckley also shared Weathers's growing concern that the team's recent history of producing highly regarded MLB talent had been causing the team to lose sight of that legacy. "We just have to make sure these guys that are coming here are doing it for the right reasons. Not just to get to the big leagues or be a first-round draft choice."

Buckley's first season as skipper was far from overwhelming, as the team finished with a paltry but promising 29–27 overall record. This marked the first time in 3 seasons that the Dirtbags finished over .500, and also saw the team climb from 9th place back into 4th in the Big West with a conference record of 12–12.

2012 saw little change in the Dirtbags' overall record (28–27), but the team performed well in conference play, winning all but 2 of their head-to-head series. In fact, heading into the final weekend of the season, the Dirtbags found themselves only 1 game behind Fullerton, with the final 3-game series between the two rivals once again set to determine the Big West title. Fullerton ended up winning two of the three games, clinching the Titans' 3rd straight conference championship. (Cal Poly's 7-game winning streak to close the season allowed the Mustangs to finish 2nd in the Big West ahead of Long Beach.)

After another middling season in 2013, the Dirtbags broke their 7-year postseason drought in 2014 by posting a 32–24 record and finishing 2nd in the Big West behind Cal Poly, good for an at-large bid to the NCAA tournament. Long Beach reached the final of the Gainesville regional before being eliminated by the underdog fourth seed Charleston.

On March 1, 2015, freshman starter Chris Matthewson and freshman reliever Darren McCaughan combined for the first no-hitter in program history against Wichita State. The Dirtbags finished the season at 28–26 and placed 6th in the Big West.

In 2016 the Dirtbags finished the regular season with a strong 36–20 record, barely missing the Big West championship after losing to Fullerton in the final game of the season. They were awarded an at-large bid to the NCAA tournament for the second time in three seasons, where they were eliminated in the regional final after losing two dramatic matches with #8 ranked regional host Miami.

2017 turned out to be the team's finest season under Buckley. On the backs of a pitching squad that ranked 8th in the nation in ERA and an offense that ranked 184th in runs scored, the Dirtbags finished the regular season with a 37–17–1 record, including a dominant 20–4 campaign in the Big West that netted the program's first conference title since 2008 and earned Buckley the honor of being named Big West coach of the year. The Dirtbags also compiled a 5–1 regular season record against arch rival Fullerton, and were recognized with a top 10 ranking in all major polls. Long Beach went on to host their first NCAA regional since 2008, and after an early loss to Texas the Dirtbags won 3 consecutive games out of the loser's bracket and advance to the Super Regional. There they faced none other than the Fullerton Titans, marking the first time in history that the heated rivals had played each other with a trip to the College World Series on the line. The Titans ultimately eliminated the Dirtbags on their home turf in the third and final game of the series. At season end the Dirtbags' record stood at 42–20–1, marking the most wins by the program in 20 years, since the 1998 team that reached the College World Series semifinal. 2017 also saw LBSU's largest draft class since the MLB draft was reduced in 2012, with 8 dirtbags drafted, headed by first team All-American catcher David Banuelos and second team All-American pitcher Darren McCaughan.

After missing the postseason in 2018 by finishing 5th in the Big West, the Dirtbags began the 2019 season with a 5–26 Start, and Buckley was relieved of his coaching job. Assistant coach Greg Bergeron was named interim head coach following his firing. The team finished the season with a 14–41 overall record, the worst winning percentage since 1988, the year before Dave Snow was hired as head coach.

=== The Valenzuela era (2020–2023) ===
On June 9, 2019, LBSU athletic director Andy Fee announced the hiring of St. Mary's Eric Valenzuela as head coach. In his six seasons as head coach of the Gaels, Valenzuela took a program that had only two winnings seasons in its history prior to his arrival and produced four consecutive 30-win seasons from 2016 to 2019, along with its first ever postseason appearances in 2016 and 2017. A former player at Arizona State and later Pepperdine (from where he graduated), Valenzuela became the first LBSU head coach since Dave Snow (and only the second in over 60 years) to have no prior playing or coaching experience at Long Beach State. But at his opening press conference, Valenzuela spoke highly of the Dirtbag spirit: "Everyone can play, we can go sign a ton of guys who can play. What separates kids for me is that mentality, that fight." Later, in regards to perceived concern among the LBSU alumni base about his lack of roots in the program, he also remarked, "I'm not an alum, I get it. I do. But if you're talking about any one person that didn't go to Long Beach State that you could call a Dirtbag, you're talking about me."

Valenzuela's first season at Long Beach State ended up being the pandemic-shortened 2020 season. The season began promisingly, with the Dirtbags winning all four weekend series to begin the season (including vs then No. 17 Wake Forest and then No. 6 Mississippi St). On March 9, the Dirtbags' season record stood at 10-5 and they were ranked in all major polls, including a No. 12 ranking by Baseball America. On March 12, with LBSU already en route to No. 29 Tulane for their first away series of the season, the Big West announced the indefinite suspension of all spring competition. Later that same day, the NCAA announced the cancellation of all spring championships. The following day, the Big West announced the immediate cancellation of all remaining spring competition. The Dirtbags' abortive season was described by Baseball America as "one of 2020's great stories before the season was cut short," and caused others to draw parallels between Valenzuela's first season and Dave Snow's iconic rookie campaign in 1989.

For the 2021 season, while still operating under pandemic-related restrictions, the Big West announced more restrictive limits on out-of-conference competition. As a result, nearly all of the Dirtbags' out of conference slate was eliminated, the lone exception being a three-game road series in April against fellow California school Pacific. Despite not having any fall practice and being one of the last teams in the country to resume practice in the Spring, the Dirtbags finished third in the conference with an overall record of 28–15, winning 16 of their final 19 contests. During the offseason, Valenzuela was awarded a contract extension though the 2026 season.

The Dirtbags' 2022 season was marked by alternating streaks of brilliance and disappointment. The team opened the season with two convincing victories over then No. 3 Mississippi St, then promptly lost each of their next 6 games, then won 10 of their next 12. The team slumped again just in time for the beginning of conference play, and by the last weekend of April they sat near the bottom of the conference with an overall record of 15–24. But over the last month of the season, the Dirtbags won 14 of their final 17 games and salvaged a 4th-place finish in the conference. At season end, the team ranked 7th in the country in ERA and 247th (out of 293 Division 1 teams) in runs scored per game. In the offseason, athletic director Andy Fee announced he would be leaving to take the same position at the Washington Huskies.

2023 saw the Dirtbags' highest win total under Valenzuela, as they posted a 33–22 overall record. Their 17–13 mark in conference play was identical to the previous season's, but this time netted only a 7th-place finish in the Big West. Three weeks after the close of the season, Valenzuela made the surprise announcement that he would be leaving Long Beach State to return to St. Mary's to take over the newly vacant head coaching position. At the same time, Associate Head Coach Bryan Peters was announced as the Interim Head Coach. Valenzuela later suggested that Long Beach's prolonged absence of a permanent athletic director played a role in his decision.

=== The Bryan Peters era (2024) ===
Bryan Peters was promoted to the interim coach on June 19, 2023. In his lone season at the helm, the program went 25-29-1, and 10-20 in Big West Conference play. He was not hired to the full time position after the 2024 season, taking an assistant position at University of South Florida.

=== The T.J. Bruce era (2025-present) ===
On June 21st, 2024, Long Beach State hired T.J. Bruce to take over guidance of the baseball program. Local press noted his connection to the community as reinvigorating the local support for the Dirtbags program. Bruce was returning to the university after serving as a player during the 2004 season, and then two stints as a member of the coaching staff in 2005 and again from 2007-2010. He came from TCU where he served as an associate head coach. In the preseason poll, Long Beach State was picked in the 2025 Coaches' poll to finish tied for 8th with rival Cal State Fullerton.

== The Dirtbag spirit ==
Although the baseball team – like all other LBSU sports teams – is officially known as the Beach (formerly the 49ers), the baseball team's players and fans alike generally prefer the more colloquial name the "Dirtbags". This ironic handle is a great source of pride and shared identity for the program, in no small part because it is frequently misinterpreted by outsiders as being a disparagement (in fact various media outlets have highlighted the program's moniker as particularly undesirable). But regardless of public perception, the term "Dirtbag" is in fact distinct from truly pejorative demonyms that have been adopted later as symbols of pride (such as Limey and Hoosier). The term was instead adopted as something to be proud of, referring to the team's scrappy playing style (which left the aggressive players' white uniforms covered in dirt – a "dirtbag") and success against higher profile programs.

The term first appeared in 1989, the first year under head coach Dave Snow. Inheriting a program that was mired in an extended stretch of sub-par seasons, Snow began his tenure (partly by necessity) by focusing his recruiting efforts on prospects who had been overlooked by higher-profile programs, with an emphasis on finding "hard-nosed guys with something to prove." Over the course of the season, infield coach Dave Malpass would routinely take his players to a local (all-dirt) Pony League field for practices, which Malpass wryly termed "Dirtbag Field". As the season progressed, the label was adopted by the players and coaches as symbolic of the tough and gritty mindset that Snow and his staff were cultivating. That year the team (which had finished 14–45 the year before Snow arrived) fought its way to an unexpected 50–15 record, and the school's first ever berth in the College World Series. Decades later, the Dirtbag name continues to be worn with distinction by players old and new.

== Year-by-year results ==
		Overall		Conference			Postseason	
Coach	Year	Record	Win %	Record	Win %	Conference – Place	Tournament Result	Final Poll
John McConnell	1954	3–13	.188	–	–	Independent	–	–
John McConnell	1955	17–4	.810	–	–	Independent	–	–
John McConnell	1956	18–6	.750	–	–	Independent	–	–
John McConnell	1957	16–13	.552	4–11	.267	CCAA – 5th	–	–
John McConnell	1958	16–10	.615	8–7	.533	CCAA – 3rd	–	–
John McConnell	1959	16–19	.457	5–10	.333	CCAA – 5th	–	–
Totals:	6 years	86–65	.570	17–28	.378	No Titles	No Appearances	
		Overall		Conference			Postseason	
Coach	Year	Record	Win %	Record	Win %	Conference – Place	Tournament Result	Final Poll
Dick Clegg	1960	20–14	.588	9–6	.600	CCAA – 3rd	–	–
Dick Clegg	1961	10–23	.303	5–11	.313	CCAA – 5th	–	–
Dick Clegg	1962	16–17	.485	9–9	.500	CCAA – 3rd	–	–
Dick Clegg	1963	6–25–1	.203	2–12	.143	CCAA – 7th	–	–
Totals:	4 years	52–79–1	.398	25–38	.397	No Titles	No Appearances	
		Overall		Conference			Postseason	
Coach	Year	Record	Win %	Record	Win %	Conference – Place	Tournament Result	Final Poll
Bob Wuesthoff	1964	31–13	.705	12–4	.750	CCAA – 1st	Regional final	–
Bob Wuesthoff	1965	30–14–1	.678	10–5	.667	CCAA – 2nd	–	–
Bob Wuesthoff	1966	28–16–1	.633	13–7	.650	CCAA – 2nd	–	–
Bob Wuesthoff	1967	25–17–1	.593	10–8	.556	CCAA – 3rd	–	–
Bob Wuesthoff	1968	22–20–1	.523	8–12	.400	CCAA – 5th	–	–
Bob Wuesthoff	1969	25–21	.543	11–7	.611	CCAA – 1st	–	24
Totals:	6 years	161–101–4	.613	64–43	.598	2 Titles	1 Appearance	
		Overall		Conference			Postseason	
Coach	Year	Record	Win %	Record	Win %	Conference – Place	Tournament Result	Final Poll
John Gonsalves	1970	29–23	.558	11–4	.733	PCAA – 1st	District 1st Round	23
John Gonsalves	1971	30–22–1	.575	9–11	.450	PCAA – 4th	–	–
John Gonsalves	1972	24–33–1	.422	6–12	.333	PCAA – 6th	–	–
John Gonsalves	1973	15–32–1	.323	4–13–1	.250	PCAA – 7th	–	–
John Gonsalves	1974	28–38	.424	8–16	.333	PCAA – 6th	–	–
John Gonsalves	1975	30–20	.600	9–12	.429	PCAA – 5th	–	–
John Gonsalves	1976	30–22–1	.575	12–9	.571	PCAA – 3rd	–	–
John Gonsalves	1977	11–43–1	.209	3–18	.143	SCBA – 7th	–	–
John Gonsalves	1978	20–37	.351	10–18	.357	SCBA – 6th	–	–
John Gonsalves	1979	40–22–3	.638	17–6–1	.729	SCBA – 2nd	–	–
John Gonsalves	1980	16–50–2	.250	5–23	.179	SCBA – 8th	–	–
John Gonsalves	1981	28–34	.452	16–11	.593	SCBA – 3rd	–	–
John Gonsalves	1982	27–33	.450	8–20	.286	SCBA – 7th	–	–
John Gonsalves	1983	36–30	.545	16–12	.571	SCBA – 4th	–	–
John Gonsalves	1984	32–34–4	.486	13–15	.464	SCBA – 5th	–	–
John Gonsalves	1985	22–42	.344	7–23	.233	Big West – 7th	–	–
John Gonsalves	1986	14–33–1	.302	5–16	.238	Big West – 8th	–	–
John Gonsalves	1987	16–41–1	.284	6–15	.286	Big West – 8th	–	–
John Gonsalves	1988	14–45	.237	4–17	.190	Big West – 8th	–	–
Totals:	19 years	462–634–16	.423	169–290–2	.369	1 Title	1 Appearance	
		Overall		Conference			Postseason	
Coach	Year	Record	Win %	Record	Win %	Conference – Place	Tournament Result	Final Poll
Dave Snow	1989	50–15	.769	17–4	.810	Big West – 1st	College World Series 1st Round	7
Dave Snow	1990	36–22–1	.619	12–9	.571	Big West – 4th	–	–
Dave Snow	1991	45–22	.672	14–7	.667	Big West – 2nd	College World Series 2nd Round	5
Dave Snow	1992	37–20–1	.647	18–5	.783	Big West – 1st	Regional Final	23
Dave Snow	1993	46–19	.708	17–4	.810	Big West – 1st	College World Series Semifinal	3
Dave Snow	1994	41–19	.683	16–5	.762	Big West – 1st	Regional 2nd Round	20
Dave Snow	1995	39–25–1	.608	16–5	.762	Big West – 2nd	Regional Final	16
Dave Snow	1996	34–26	.567	15–6	.714	Big West – 1st	Regional 1st Round	–
Dave Snow	1997	39–26	.600	22–8	.733	Big West (South) – 1st	Regional 2nd Round	24
Dave Snow	1998	43–23–1	.649	23–7	.767	Big West (South) – 2nd	College World Series Semifinal	4
Dave Snow	1999	35–25	.583	19–11	.633	Big West – 3rd	Regional Final	29
Dave Snow	2000	31–25	.554	18–12	.600	Big West – 3rd	–	–
Dave Snow	2001	35–23	.603	11–7	.611	Big West – 3rd	Regional 1st Round	–
Totals:	13 years	511–290–4	.637	218–90	.708	6 Titles	11 Appearances	
		Overall		Conference			Postseason	
Coach	Year	Record	Win %	Record	Win %	Conference – Place	Tournament Result	Final Poll
Mike Weathers	2002	39–21	.650	17–7	.708	Big West – 2nd	Regional Final	27
Mike Weathers	2003	41–20	.672	16–5	.762	Big West – 1st	Super Regional	11
Mike Weathers	2004	40–21	.656	14–7	.667	Big West – 2nd	Super Regional	12
Mike Weathers	2005	37–22	.627	14–7	.667	Big West – 2nd	Regional 2nd Round	18
Mike Weathers	2006	29–27	.518	12–9	.571	Big West – 2nd	–	–
Mike Weathers	2007	39–20	.661	15–6	.714	Big West – 2nd	Regional Final	26
Mike Weathers	2008	38–21	.644	16–8	.667	Big West – 1st	Regional 2nd Round	19
Mike Weathers	2009	25–29	.463	11–13	.458	Big West – 6th	–	–
Mike Weathers	2010	23–32	.418	7–17	.292	Big West – 9th	–	–
Totals:	9 years	301–213	.586	122–79	.607	2 Titles	6 Appearances	
		Overall		Conference			Postseason	
Coach	Year	Record	Win %	Record	Win %	Conference – Place	Tournament Result	Final Poll
Troy Buckley	2011	29–27	.518	12–12	.500	Big West – 4th	–	–
Troy Buckley	2012	28–27	.509	15–9	.625	Big West – 3rd	–	–
Troy Buckley	2013	29–27	.518	15–12	.556	Big West – 4th	–	–
Troy Buckley	2014	34–26	.567	17–7	.708	Big West – 2nd	Regional Final	–
Troy Buckley	2015	28–26	.519	11–13	.458	Big West – 6th	–	–
Troy Buckley	2016	38–22	.633	15–9	.625	Big West – 2nd	Regional Final	–
Troy Buckley	2017	42–20–1	.675	20–4	.833	Big West – 1st	Super Regional	9
Troy Buckley	2018	27-30	.474	12-12	.500	Big West - 5th	-	-
Troy Buckley	2019	14-41	.255	8-16	.333	Big West - 9th	-	-
Totals:	9 years	269–246–1	.522	125–94	.571	1 Title	3 Appearances	
		Overall		Conference			Postseason	
Coach	Year	Record	Win %	Record	Win %	Conference – Place	Tournament Result	Final Poll
Eric Valenzuela	2020	10-5	.667	0-0	-	Big West – 3rd	Postseason cancelled	12
Eric Valenzuela	2021	28–15	.651	26–14	.650	Big West – 3rd	–	–
Eric Valenzuela	2022	29–27	.518	17–13	.567	Big West – 4th	–	–
Eric Valenzuela	2023	33–22	.600	17–13	.567	Big West – 7th	–	–
Totals:	4 years	100–69	.592	60–40	.600	No Titles	No Appearances	
		Overall		Conference			Postseason	
Coach	Year	Record	Win %	Record	Win %	Conference – Place	Tournament Result	Final Poll
Bryan Peters (interim)	2024	25–29–1	.464	10-20	.333	Big West – 8th	-	-
Totals:	1 year	25–29–1	.464	10-20	.333	No Titles	No Appearances	
		Overall		Conference			Postseason	
Coach	Year	Record	Win %	Record	Win %	Conference – Place	Tournament Result	Final Poll
T. J. Bruce	2025	22–31	.415	15–15	.500	Big West – 7th	-	-
T. J. Bruce	2026	17–35	.327	11–19	.367	Big West – 10th	–	–
Totals:	2 years	39–66	.371	26–34	.433	No Titles	No Appearances	

†Poll rankings through 2023 are from Collegiate Baseball unless otherwise noted

== Notable former players ==
As of 2023, no fewer than 56 players who played for Long Beach State have made appearances in Major League Baseball, a figure which consistently ranks as one of the highest of any university in the nation. Some of the notable alumni:

- Abe Alvarez
- Bobby Crosby
- Marco Estrada
- Matt Duffy
- Jarren Duran
- Danny Espinosa
- Michael Gallo
- Jason Giambi
- Chris Gomez
- Garrett Hampson
- Jeff Liefer
- Evan Longoria
- Jeff McNeil
- Jeremy Reed
- Bryan Shaw
- Terrmel Sledge
- Steve Trachsel
- Troy Tulowitzki
- Jason Vargas
- Nick Vincent
- Jered Weaver
- Vance Worley
- Tom Urbani

== See also ==
- List of NCAA Division I baseball programs
