= Wilbur V. Hubbard =

American football, basketball, baseball, and golf coach

Biographical details
- Born: February 5, 1907; San Jose, California, U.S.
- Died: January 2, 1986 (aged 78); Placerville, California, U.S.

Playing career

Football
- 1925–1928: San Jose State

Basketball
- 1925–1929: San Jose State
- Positions: Quarterback (football), guard (basketball)

Coaching career (HC unless noted)

Football
- 1947–1949: San Jose State

Basketball
- 1935–1940: San Jose State
- 1944–1945: San Jose State

Baseball
- 1933–1934: San Jose State

Golf
- 1948: San Jose State

Administrative career (AD unless noted)
- 1950–1960: San Jose State

Head coaching record
- Overall: 36–11–1 (football); 65–57 (basketball); 18–12–1 (baseball)
- Bowls: 2–0

Accomplishments and honors

Championships
- Football; 3 CCAA (1946, 1948–1949) Golf; 1 NCAA (1948)

Wilbur Virgil "Bill" Hubbard (February 5, 1907 – January 2, 1986) was an American football, basketball, baseball, and golf coach.

== Playing career ==
=== San Jose State ===
Hubbard was an outstanding athlete at San Jose State University. He lettered four times as a quarterback in football and four times as a guard on the school's basketball team.

=== Stanford ===
Hubbard transferred to Stanford University in 1930 with the hopes of playing on the school's football team, but he was ruled ineligible due to playing for four years at San Jose State.

== Coaching career ==
Hubbard returned to San Jose State to coach a number of sports, including being the head football (1947–1949), basketball (1935–1940, 1944–1945), and baseball coach.

Perhaps his most notable achievement was leading the San Jose State men's golf team to a national championship in 1948.

== Death ==
Hubbard suffered a stroke on December 24, 1985, at his home in Shingle Springs, California. He died on January 2, 1986, at a hospital in Placerville, California.

== Head coaching record ==
=== Football ===
Year	Team	Overall	Conference	Standing	Bowl/playoffs
San Jose State Spartans (California Collegiate Athletic Association) (1946–1947)
1946	San Jose State	9–1–1	4–0	1st	W Raisin
1947	San Jose State	9–3	3–2	2nd	
1948	San Jose State	9–3	5–0	1st	
1949	San Jose State	9–4	4–0	1st	W Raisin
San Jose State:		36–11–1	16–2		
Total:		36–11–1			
National championship Conference title Conference division title or championship game berth
