= 1948 NCAA golf championship =

1948 NCAA Golf Championship
Tournament information
- Location: Stanford, California, U.S. 37.4216°N 122.1837°W
- Course: Stanford Golf Course

Statistics
- Field: 23 teams

Champion
- Team: San Jose State (1st title); Individual: Bob Harris (San Jose State)
- Team: 579

Location map
- Location in the United States Location in California

The 1948 NCAA Golf Championship was the tenth annual NCAA-sanctioned golf tournament to determine the individual and team national champions of men's collegiate golf in the United States.

The tournament was held at the Stanford Golf Course in Stanford, California.

San Jose State won the team title, nine strokes ahead of defending champions LSU on the leaderboard. Coached by Wilbur V. Hubbard, this was the Spartans' first NCAA team national title.

The individual championship was won by Bob Harris, also from San Jose State.

== Team results ==
Rank	Team	Score
1	San Jose State	579
2	LSU (DC)	588
3	Stanford	590
4	Duke	595
5	Oklahoma A&M	599
6	Michigan	600
7	UCLA	602
8	Oklahoma	606
9	Washington	609
10	North Texas State	611

- Note: Top 10 only
- DC = Defending champions
