= Intercollegiate sports team judo champions =

The first tier of intercollegiate sports in the United States includes sports that are sanctioned by one of the collegiate sport governing bodies. The major sanctioning organization is the National Collegiate Athletic Association (NCAA). Before mid-1981, women's top-tier intercollegiate sports were solely governed by the Association for Intercollegiate Athletics for Women (AIAW). The second tier consists of competition between student clubs from different colleges, not organized by and therefore not formally representing the institutions or their faculties. This tier is also considered to be "intercollegiate" sports. College sports originated as student activities.

NCAA Team Champions: see NCAA Championships

Pre-NCAA Team Champions: see Pre-NCAA intercollegiate championships

AIAW Team Champions: see AIAW and DGWS Championships

NAIA Team Champions: see NAIA Championships

Intercollegiate Team Champions of Non-NCAA and Non-AIAW Sports in the United States:

- The championships below were bestowed by the governing bodies of specific collegiate sports in years when the sport lacked official varsity status in the NCAA (which many still lack) or in the AIAW (and the DGWS that preceded it).
- At some colleges, some of these sports operate at a club level outside of any athletic department. On the other hand, some teams have been accorded varsity status within their schools' athletic programs. Generally, there is no strict separation during competition, but there are exceptions (e.g., Varsity Equestrian since 2006, as it seeks official NCAA status).
- This list is reserved for champions of sports in which the NCAA did not also recognize a champion in a given year. Thus, non-varsity and/or club-level champions are excluded for sports that had a contemporary NCAA champion (e.g., men's ice hockey, alpine skiing) or other collegiate varsity-level champion (e.g., IRA rowing).

Key to initialism

Some schools in this list are more commonly known by their initials.

Athletics brand name	School
BYU	Brigham Young University
LSU	Louisiana State University
MIT	Massachusetts Institute of Technology
RIT	Rochester Institute of Technology
RPI	Rensselaer Polytechnic Institute
UCF	University of Central Florida
USC	University of Southern California
UTSA	University of Texas at San Antonio

Key to location

The locations of some schools in this list are not obvious from their names.

School	Location
Air Force	Colorado
Army (also, Military Academy)	New York
Babson	Massachusetts
Baylor	Texas
Bentley	Massachusetts
Bradley	Illinois
Bryant	Rhode Island
Castleton State	Vermont
Chico State	California
Coast Guard Academy	Connecticut
College of Charleston	South Carolina
Dayton	Ohio
Drexel	Pennsylvania
Furman	South Carolina
Georgetown	District of Columbia
Hobart and William Smith Colleges	New York
Holy Cross	Massachusetts
James Madison	Virginia
Johnson State	Vermont
Life University	Georgia
Lindenwood	Missouri
Lock Haven	Pennsylvania
Long Beach State	California
Merchant Marine Academy	New York
Middlebury	Vermont
Mount St. Mary's	Maryland
Navy (also, Naval Academy)	Maryland
Norwich	Connecticut
Old Dominion	Virginia
Providence	Rhode Island
Radcliffe	Massachusetts
Radford	Virginia
Rensselaer Polytechnic Institute	New York
Roger Williams	Rhode Island
Saint Mary's College	California
Salisbury	Maryland
Shenandoah	Virginia
Shippensburg	Pennsylvania
Stonehill	Massachusetts
Stony Brook	New York
Temple	Pennsylvania
Tufts	Massachusetts
Tulane	Louisiana
Western Health Sciences	California

== National Collegiate Judo Association ==
Year	Men	Women	Year	Men	Women	Year	Men	Women
1962	San José State University		1987	San José State University	Slippery Rock University (PA)	2012	San José State University	U.S. Military Academy
1963	San José State University		1988	Fresno State University	San Francisco State University	2013	San José State University	San José State University
1964	San José State University		1989	San José State University	Tie - San José State University, Fresno State University	2014	San José State University	U.S. Military Academy
1965	San José State University		1990	San José State University	Tie - San Jose State University, Fresno State University	2015	San José State University	U.S. Military Academy
1966	San José State University		1991	San José State University	San José State University	2016	Tie - San José State University, U.S. Military Academy	San José State University
1967	San José State University		1992	San José State University	San José State University	2017	San José State University	San José State University
1968	San José State University		1993	San José State University	San José State University	2018	U.S. Military Academy	San José State University
1969	San José State University		1994	San José State University	U.S. Military Academy	2019	U.S. Military Academy	San José State University
1970	San José State University		1995	San José State University (Note: One team champion based on overall scoring of both men's and women's divisions for 4-year schools. Four of the eight women's weight divisions had only one player each.)		2020	Canceled due to COVID-19 pandemic	
1971	San José State University		1996	San José State University	San José State University	2021	Canceled due to COVID-19 pandemic	
1972	San José State University		1997	San José State University	University of Colorado-Colorado Springs	2022	Texas A&M University	San José State University
1973	San José State University		1998	San José State University	San José State University	2023	San José State University	San José State University
1974	San José State University		1999	San José State University	San José State University	2024	San José State University	Fresno State University
1975	San José State University (Note: The official results also list the overall combined team scoring, with San Jose State atop the standings.)		2000	San José State University	University of Colorado-Colorado Springs	2025	San José State University	U.S. Military Academy
1976	San José State University	?	2001	San José State University	San José State University	2026	San José State University	San José State University
1977	San José State University	?	2002	San José State University	San José State University	2027		
1978	San José State University	San José State University	2003	San José State University	San José State University	2028		
1979	San José State University	?	2004	Cumberland College	University of Louisiana-Lafayette	2029		
1980	San José State University	?	2005	San José State University	San José State University	2030		
1981	San José State University	Cumberland College (KY)	2006	San José State University	San José State University	2031		
1982	San José State University	Cumberland College	2007	San José State University	San José State University	2032		
1983	San José State University	?	2008	San José State University	San José State University	2033		
1984	Cumberland College	Michigan State University	2009	San José State University (Note: One overall team champion selected based on 5-3-1 scoring over all men's and women's weight divisions for both standard and novice players.)		2034		
1985	Fresno State University	?	2010	U.S. Military Academy	San José State University	2035		
1986	San José State University	Cumberland College	2011	U.S. Military Academy	U.S. Military Academy	2036		

== Championship Records ==
=== Men's ===
University	# of Championships	Years won
San José State University	54	1962, 1963, 1964, 1965, 1966, 1967, 1968, 1969, 1970, 1971, 1972, 1973, 1974, 1975, 1976, 1977, 1978, 1979, 1980, 1981, 1982, 1983, 1986, 1987, 1989, 1990, 1991, 1992, 1993, 1994, 1995, 1996, 1997, 1998, 1999, 2000, 2001, 2002, 2003, 2005, 2006, 2007, 2008, 2009, 2012, 2013, 2014, 2015, 2016, 2017, 2023, 2024, 2025, 2026
U.S. Military Academy	5	2010, 2011, 2016, 2018, 2019
Cumberland College	2	1984, 2004
California State University, Fresno	2	1985, 1988
Texas A&M University	1	2022

=== Women's ===
University	# of Championships	Years won
San José State University	27	1978, 1989, 1990, 1991, 1992, 1993, 1995, 1996, 1998, 1999, 2001, 2002, 2003, 2005, 2006, 2007, 2008, 2009, 2010, 2013, 2016, 2017, 2018, 2019, 2022, 2023, 2026
U.S. Military Academy	6	1994, 2011, 2012, 2014, 2015, 2025
Cumberland College	3	1981, 1982, 1986,
California State University, Fresno	2	1989, 1990, 2024
University of Colorado-Colorado Springs	2	1997, 2000
Michigan State University	1	1984
Slippery Rock University	1	1987
San Francisco State University	1	1988
University of Louisiana-Lafayette	1	2004

== See also ==
- Intercollegiate sports team champions
