= Dave Snow =

American college baseball coach

Playing career
- 1969–1970: Cerritos College
- 1971–1972: Cal Poly
- Position: Third baseman

Coaching career (HC unless noted)
- 1973–1977: Cal State Fullerton (asst)
- 1978–1982: Los Angeles Valley College
- 1983–1984: Cal State Fullerton (asst)
- 1985–1988: Loyola Marymount
- 1989–2001: Long Beach State

Head coaching record
- Overall: 828–413–5
- Tournaments: NCAA: 41–29

Accomplishments and honors

Championships
- WCAC (1986); Big West (1989, 1992, 1993, 1994, 1996)

Awards
- WCAC Coach of the Year (1986); Big West Coach of the Year (1989, 1992, 1993, 1996, 1997); Baseball America College Coach of the Year (1986, 1989)

David Snow is a former American college baseball coach. He served as head coach of the Loyola Marymount Lions baseball team, leading them to the 1986 College World Series and later as the head coach of the Long Beach State 49ers baseball team, whom he led to the College World Series in 1989, 1991, 1993, and 1998. He retired from coaching in 2001 after a 29 year career that also included a head coaching job at Los Angeles Valley College and time as an assistant to Cal State Fullerton coach Augie Garrido.

== Playing career ==
Snow played third base at Bellflower High School in Bellflower, California. He was drafted in the 17th round of the 1968 Major League Baseball draft by the Houston Astros. Snow decided not to sign with Houston, and attended Cerritos College. Snow was the third baseman for the Falcons for the 1969 and 1970 seasons. He would go on to play two seasons at Cal Poly under Augie Garrido. He led the Mustangs in doubles (8) and RBIs (31) in 1971.

== Coaching career ==
Snow followed Garrido to Cal State Fullerton, where he became an assistant. In 1978, he left to become the head coach at Los Angeles Valley College. He went 156–41 at Los Angeles Valley, winning four consecutive conference championships. He returned to assisting at Cal State Fullerton in 1983 and 1984, before leaving to become the head coach of the Loyola Marymount Lions baseball team in 1985.

== Head coaching record ==
Record table
Season	Team	Overall	Conference	Standing	Postseason
Los Angeles Valley Monarchs (Metropolitan Conference) (1978–1982)
Los Angeles Valley:		156–41			
Loyola Marymount Lions (West Coast Athletic Conference) (1985–1988)
1985	Loyola Marymount	27–28	12–12	4th	
1986	Loyola Marymount	50–15	19–5	T-1st	College World Series
1987	Loyola Marymount	36–21–1	10–12–1	4th	
1988	Loyola Marymount	48–18	18–6	3rd	Midwest Regional
Loyola Marymount:		161–82–1	59–35		
Long Beach State Dirtbags (Big West Conference) (1989–2001)
1989	Long Beach State	50–15	17–4	1st	College World Series
1990	Long Beach State	36–22–1	12–9	4th	
1991	Long Beach State	45–22	14–7	2nd	College World Series
1992	Long Beach State	37–20–1	18–5	1st	Central Regional
1993	Long Beach State	46–19	17–4	1st	College World Series
1994	Long Beach State	41–19	16–5	1st	Midwest II Regional
1995	Long Beach State	39–25–1	16–5	2nd	West Regional
1996	Long Beach State	34–26	15–6	1st	Central I Regional
1997	Long Beach State	39–26	22–8	1st (South)	South I Regional
1998	Long Beach State	43–23–1	23–7	2nd (South)	College World Series
1999	Long Beach State	35–25	19–11	3rd	NCAA Regional
2000	Long Beach State	31–25	18–12	T-3rd	
2001	Long Beach State	35–23	11–7	3rd	NCAA Regional
Long Beach State:		511–290–4	218–90		
Total:		828–413–5			
National champion Postseason invitational champion Conference regular season champion Conference regular season and conference tournament champion Division regular season champion Division regular season and conference tournament champion Conference tournament champion
