= Walt McPherson =

American basketball coach (1916–2013)

Biographical details
- Born: December 5, 1916; San Jose, California, U.S.
- Died: January 12, 2013 (aged 96); Santa Rosa, California, U.S.
- Education: San Jose State University

Coaching career (HC unless noted)
- 1940–1942: San Jose State
- 1945–1960: San Jose State

Head coaching record
- Overall: 264–208 (.559)

Walter James McPherson (December 5, 1916 – January 12, 2013) was an American basketball coach and was regarded as one of the best at San Jose State University, and former West Coast Athletic Conference commissioner. McPherson graduated from San Jose State in 1939 and played as a fullback through 1936 and 1938 trained by Dudley DeGroot. He became a basketball coach and assistant football coach, he also managed to get his basketball team in the NCAA Tournament which was the team's first time in the tournament. He also taught Carroll Williams and Billy Wilson who also started their own sport careers. McPherson retired from coaching in 1960.

== Personal life ==
McPherson was involved in World War II and became a lieutenant in the United States Navy. He became a member of San Jose Sports Hall of Fame in 2006. McPherson died in 2013 in Santa Rosa, California. He is survived by two children, including poet and University of California, Davis professor Sandra McPherson.

== Head coaching record ==
Record table
Season	Team	Overall	Conference	Standing	Postseason
San Jose State Spartans (California Collegiate Athletic Association) (1940–1942)
1940–41	San Jose State	19–8			
1941–42	San Jose State	13–20			
San Jose State Spartans (California Collegiate Athletic Association) (1945–1950)
1945–46	San Jose State	17–14			
1946–47	San Jose State	18–9			
1947–48	San Jose State	23–9			
1948–49	San Jose State	22–13			
1949–50	San Jose State	21–7			
San Jose State Spartans (Independent) (1950–1952)
1950–51	San Jose State	18–12			NCAA Sweet Sixteen
1951–52	San Jose State	15–10			
San Jose State Spartans (West Coast Conference) (1952–1960)
1952–53	San Jose State	15–8	4–4	T–3rd	
1953–54	San Jose State	12–15	6–6	3rd	
1954–55	San Jose State	16–9	7–5	2nd	
1955–56	San Jose State	15–10	8–6	T–4th	
1956–57	San Jose State	13–12	7–7	T–4th	
1957–58	San Jose State	13–13	5–7	T–4th	
1958–59	San Jose State	5–19	1–11	7th	
1959–60	San Jose State	6–19	2–10	T–6th	
San Jose State:		261–207 (.558)	40–56 (.417)		
Total:		261–207 (.558)			
National champion Postseason invitational champion Conference regular season champion Conference regular season and conference tournament champion Division regular season champion Division regular season and conference tournament champion Conference tournament champion
