= Bob Wuesthoff =

Baseball coach

Biographical details
- Born: May 25, 1926; Alameda, California, U.S.
- Died: July 12, 2013 (aged 87)

Playing career
- 1949–1950: San Jose State

Coaching career (HC unless noted)
- 1950–1953: San Jose State (asst)
- 1962–1963: Long Beach State JV
- 1964–1969: Long Beach State

Administrative career (AD unless noted)
- 1969: Long Beach State (Interim AD)

Head coaching record
- Overall: 158–101–4
- Tournaments: NCAA: 1–1

Accomplishments and honors

Championships
- CCAA (1964, 1969)

Robert William Wuesthoff (May 25, 1926 – July 12, 2013) was the baseball coach for the Long Beach State Forty Niners Baseball Team from 1964 to 1969 and the founder of "49er Camp," a youth sports summer camp created at Cal State Long Beach in 1968 that is still running strong today.

== Career ==
In 1964, Long Beach State hired the former junior varsity baseball coach to succeed Dick Clegg, who had been instrumental in bringing Wuesthoff to Long Beach State as his assistant. Under the guidance of Wuesthoff, the 1964 Forty Niners Baseball Team, then Division II, beat the defending national champion USC Trojans as well as the nation's #2 ranked Arizona Wildcats on their road to winning the CCAA League Title. By sweeping the defending CCAA Champion Fresno State Bulldogs, ending the league with a record of 11 wins and 4 losses, and giving the Forty Niners a birth into the NCAA National Tournament, Wuesthoff was named CCAA Coach of the Year, and NCAA Western Regional Coach of the Year.

== Head coaching record ==
Record table
Season	Team	Overall	Conference	Standing	Postseason
Long Beach State Dirtbags (California Collegiate Athletic Association) (1964–1969)
1964	Long Beach State	30–13	12–4	1st	Regional
1965	Long Beach State	29–14–1	10–5	2nd	
1966	Long Beach State	28–16–1	13–7	2nd	
1967	Long Beach State	25–17	10–8	3rd	
1968	Long Beach State	21–20–1	8–12	5th	
1969	Long Beach State	25–21–1	11–7	1st	
Long Beach State:		158–101–4	64–43		
Total:		158–101–4			
National champion Postseason invitational champion Conference regular season champion Conference regular season and conference tournament champion Division regular season champion Division regular season and conference tournament champion Conference tournament champion
