= Pacific Shores Center =

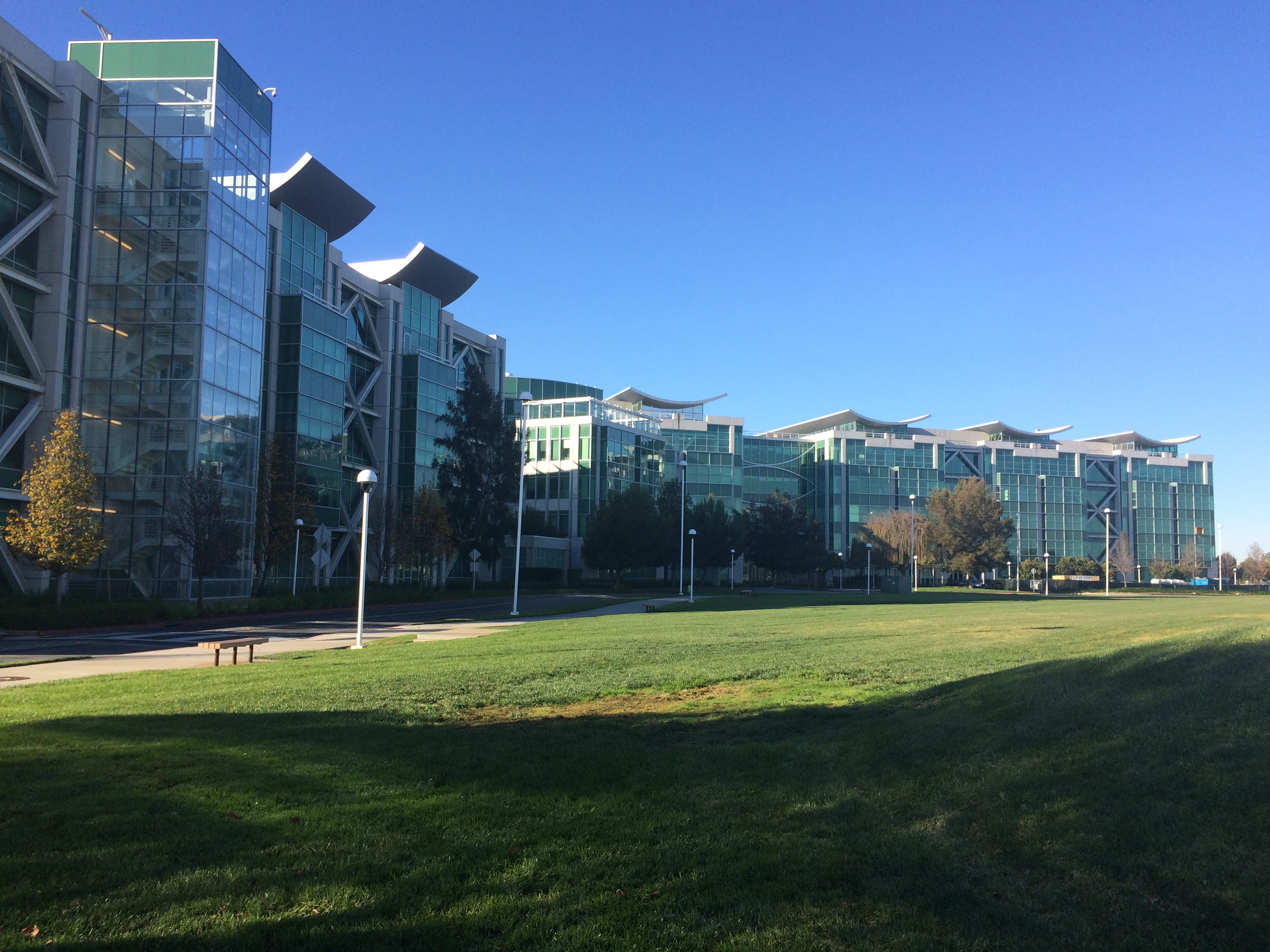
- View of buildings facing Greco Island

- Location within San Francisco Bay Area Location within California Location within the United States
- Location: Redwood City, California
- Coordinates: 37°30′42″N 122°12′10″W
- Opening date: 2001; 25 years ago
- Developer: Jay Paul Company
- Construction cost: US$500,000,000
- Owner: Informatica, Google, DivcoWest
- Architect: DES Architects + Engineers
- Size: 106 acres (43 ha)
- Parking: 4000
- Website: www.jaypaul.com/Portfolio.aspx?Id=120

Pacific Shores Center is a high-tech business park located in Redwood City, California, adjacent to the Port of Redwood City.

== History ==
The property that Pacific Shores Center was developed on had many uses through the years from part of the Redwood City Harbor Company to cement production to being part of saltworks with Leslie Salt. In 1990 the Teachers' Retirement System of the State of Illinois bought 116 acres (47 ha) of land adjacent to the Port of Redwood City and Westpoint Slough and formed the Pacific Shores Center Partnership to develop it. After many years of planning Redwood City and the partnership had a complete development agreement with plans for a land swap, that decreased the total property to 106 acres (43 ha), and public shore space to allow for public use of parts of the property. In November 1999 Jay Paul Company entered into an agreement to buy the rights for the project by outbidding several other competing developers with a US$90,000,000 bid. By early 2000 with the buildings not even complete; Excite@Home, Phone.com, Informatica Corp, and BroadVision Inc. had all signed leases. Demand at the time caused rent prices to increase for the center as well. At this time there were plans for a ferry service to connect San Francisco and Alameda, California to an adjacent ferry terminal to mitigate traffic concerns at the time with so many of the expected workers to be projected commuting.

By April 2002 the burst of the Dot-com bubble had decreased demand for office space and the center previously estimated to fill completely was sitting with a vacancy rate of 65%. However fortunes changed and in late 2006 the campus was sold from Jay Paul to Starwood Capital Group for over US$800,000,000 for the center which had hit 90% capacity. Tenants at the time included Eidos Interactive, PDL BioPharma, DreamWorks Animation, Threshold Pharmaceutical, Openwave, Symantec, and engineering firm Rudolph and Sletten. The following year two of the buildings, specifically the ones PDL BioPharma was located within, were sold to Shorenstein Properties for an undisclosed sum, for the first time making Pacific Shores Center to have more than one owner. San Mateo County filed a lawsuit in August 2009 over a tax dispute with the Center. County officials claimed that the sale of property in 2006 never had the property transfer taxes paid while the Center argued over the county tax code.

Starwood Capital ran into issues with overdue debt in 2012 and brought in Blackstone with an ownership stake. Starwood also sold off two of the buildings at the complex to Informatica for US$148,500,000. In 2014, Google bought the six buildings, over half the center, at 934,200 square feet (86,790 m^{2}) of office space, which Starwood and Blackstone owned, for US$585,000,000. Shortly after Google's purchase, Shorenstein Properties sold the two buildings they owned to DivcoWest Properties for about US$260,000,000. This has left Pacific Shores Center with fragmented ownership to this day with the three owners all with different sections.

== Other ==
Pacific Shores Center is used more than just as an area for work. The facilities present include a 38,000 square feet (3,500 m^{2}) fitness center that includes a gym, pool, and spa along with playing fields. Public shore access allows for people to park and walk along the Westpoint Slough on a section of the San Francisco Bay Trail.

The annual Stanford University Treeathlon triathlon competition is hosted in part at the center along with the Westpoint Harbor.

== Gallery ==
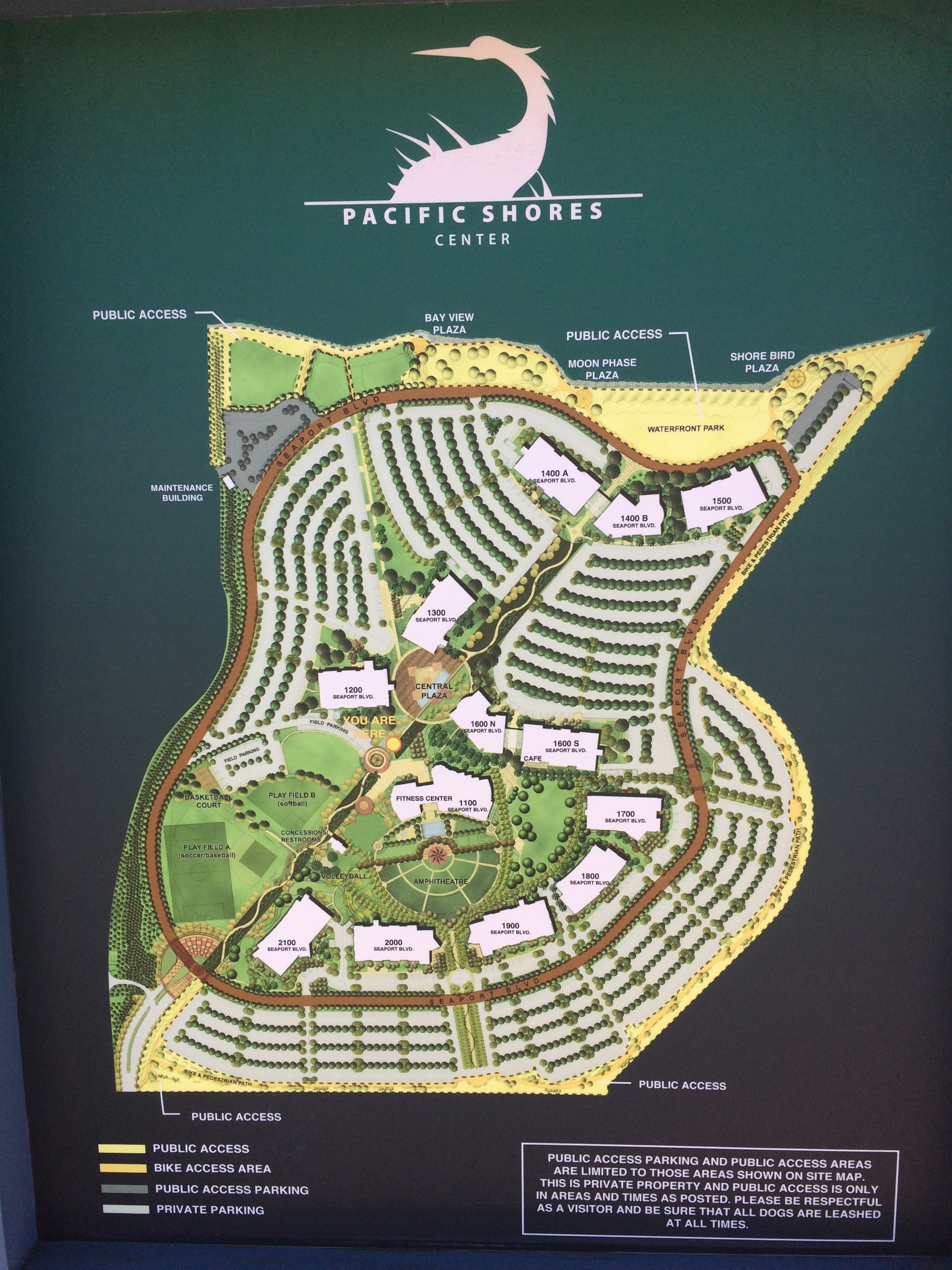
Detailed map of Pacific Shores

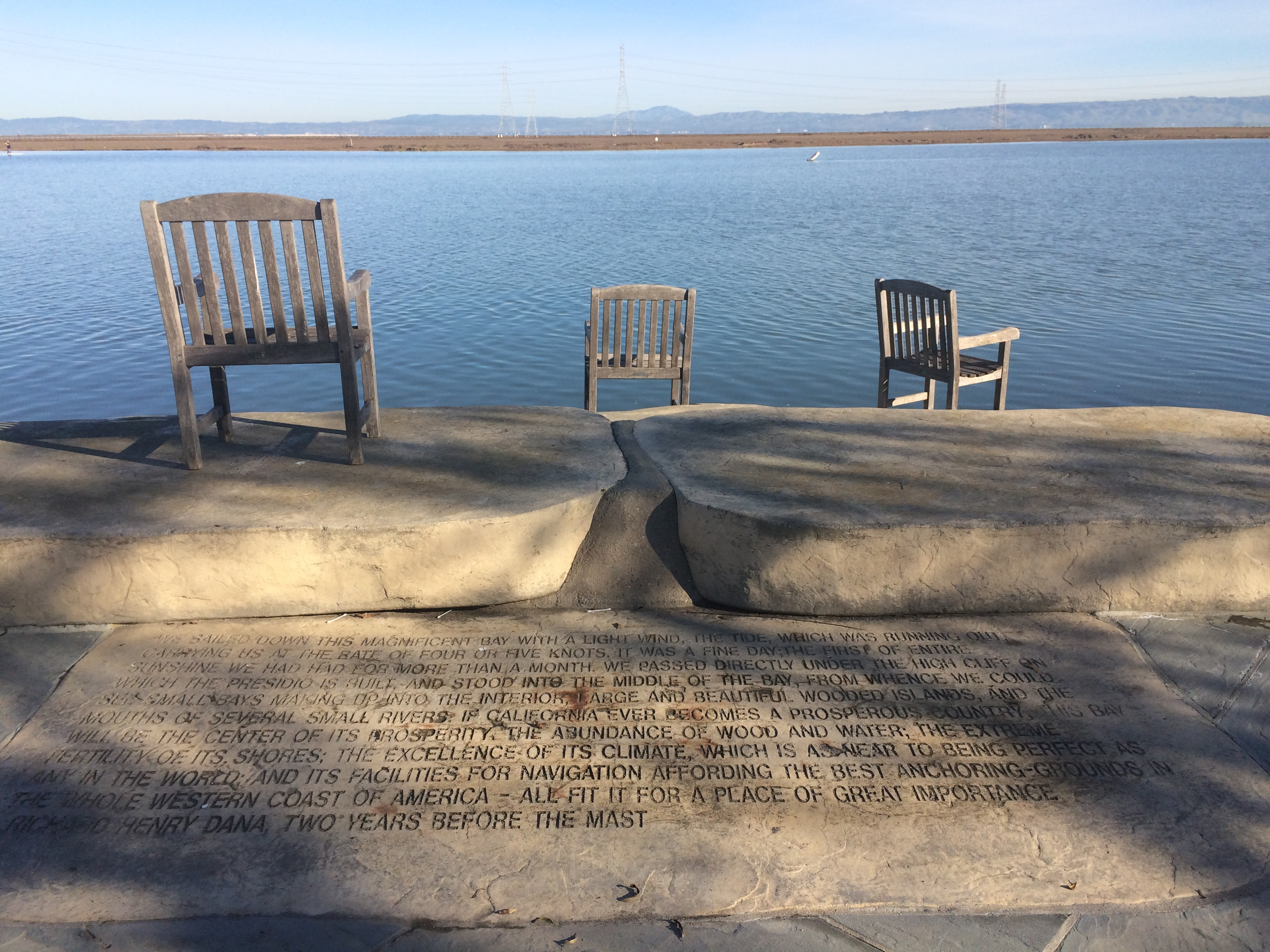
Seats and Inscription from Two Years Before the Mast

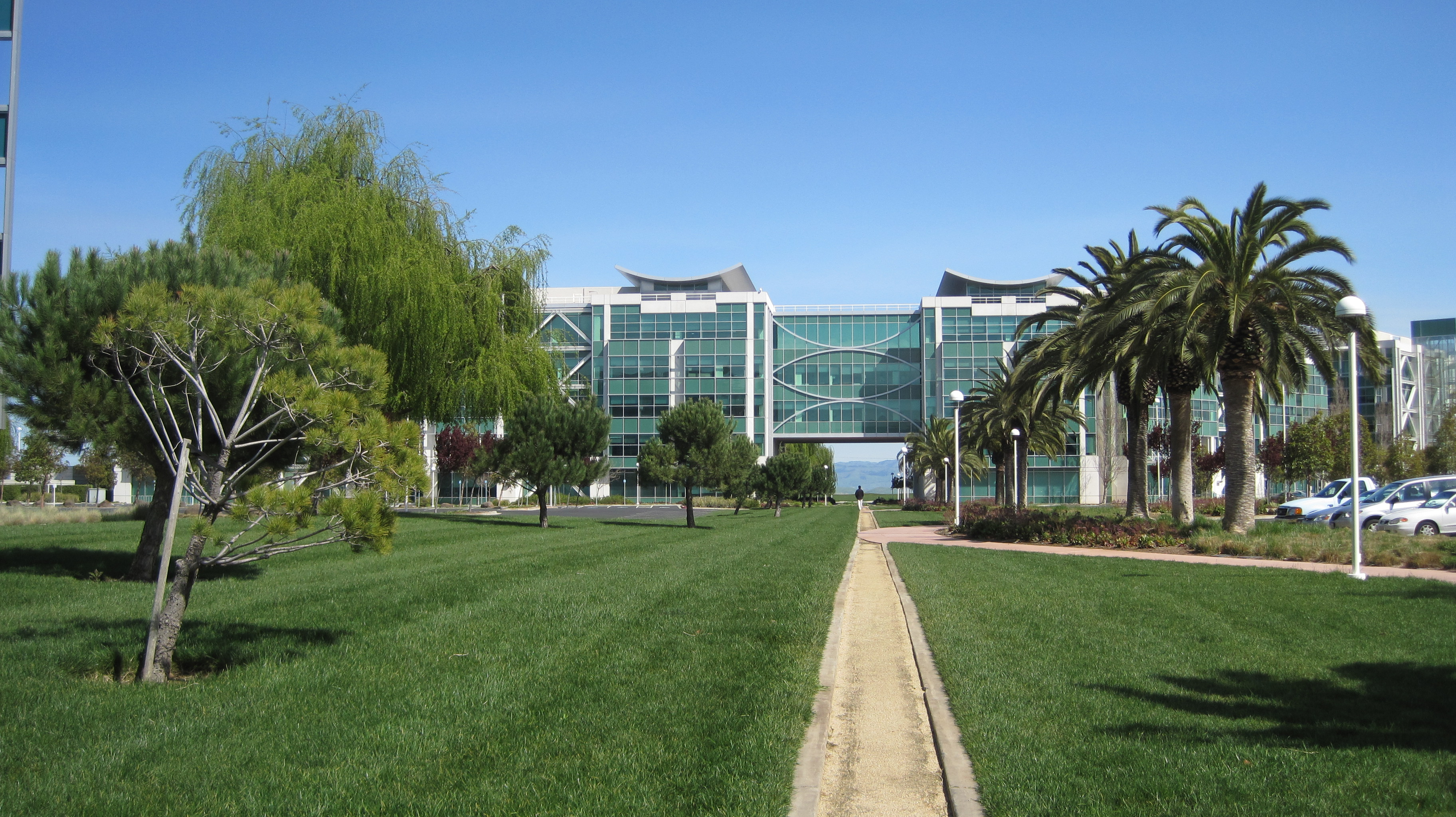
View towards the East Bay hills from the center

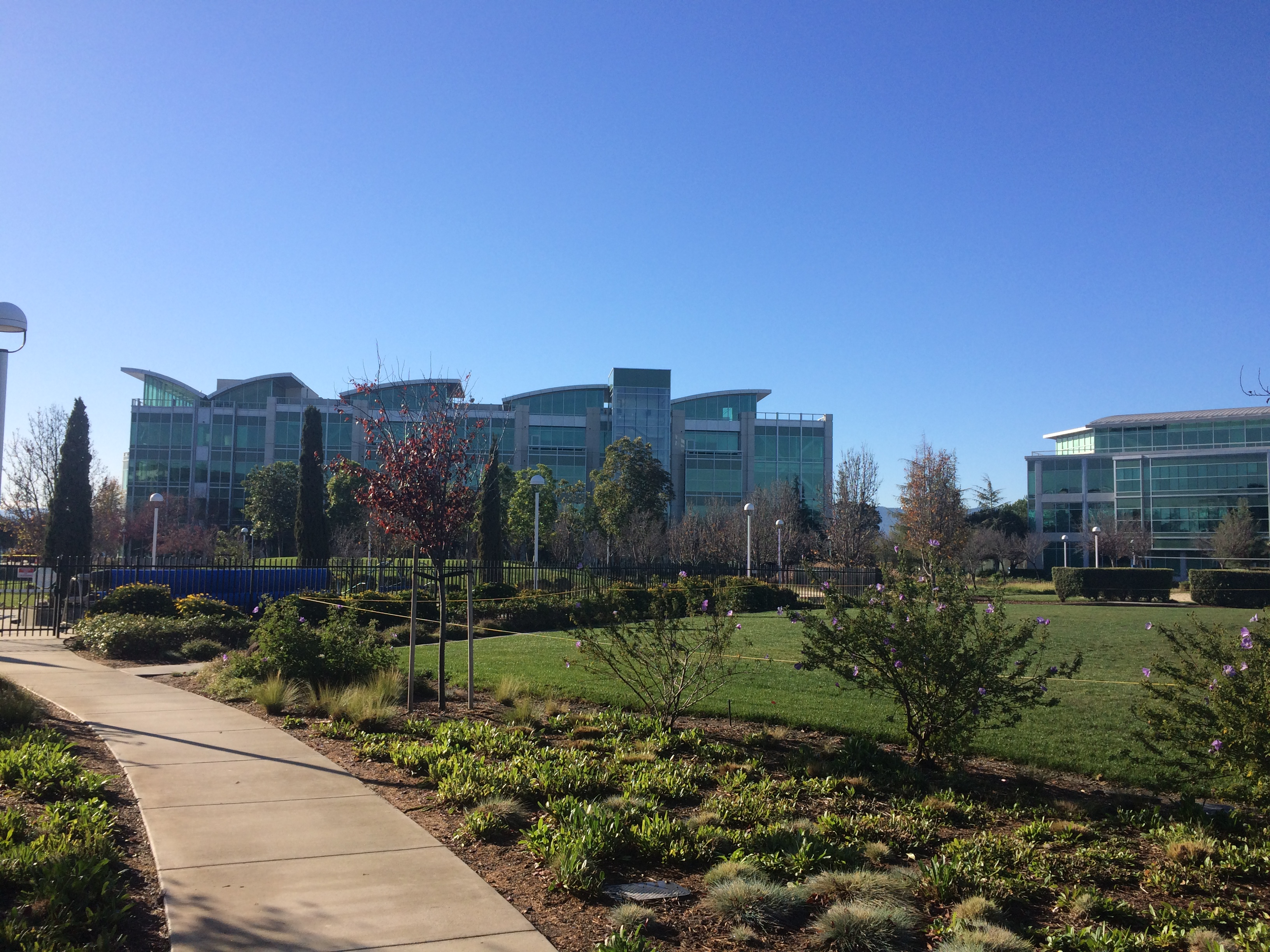
View west from the center

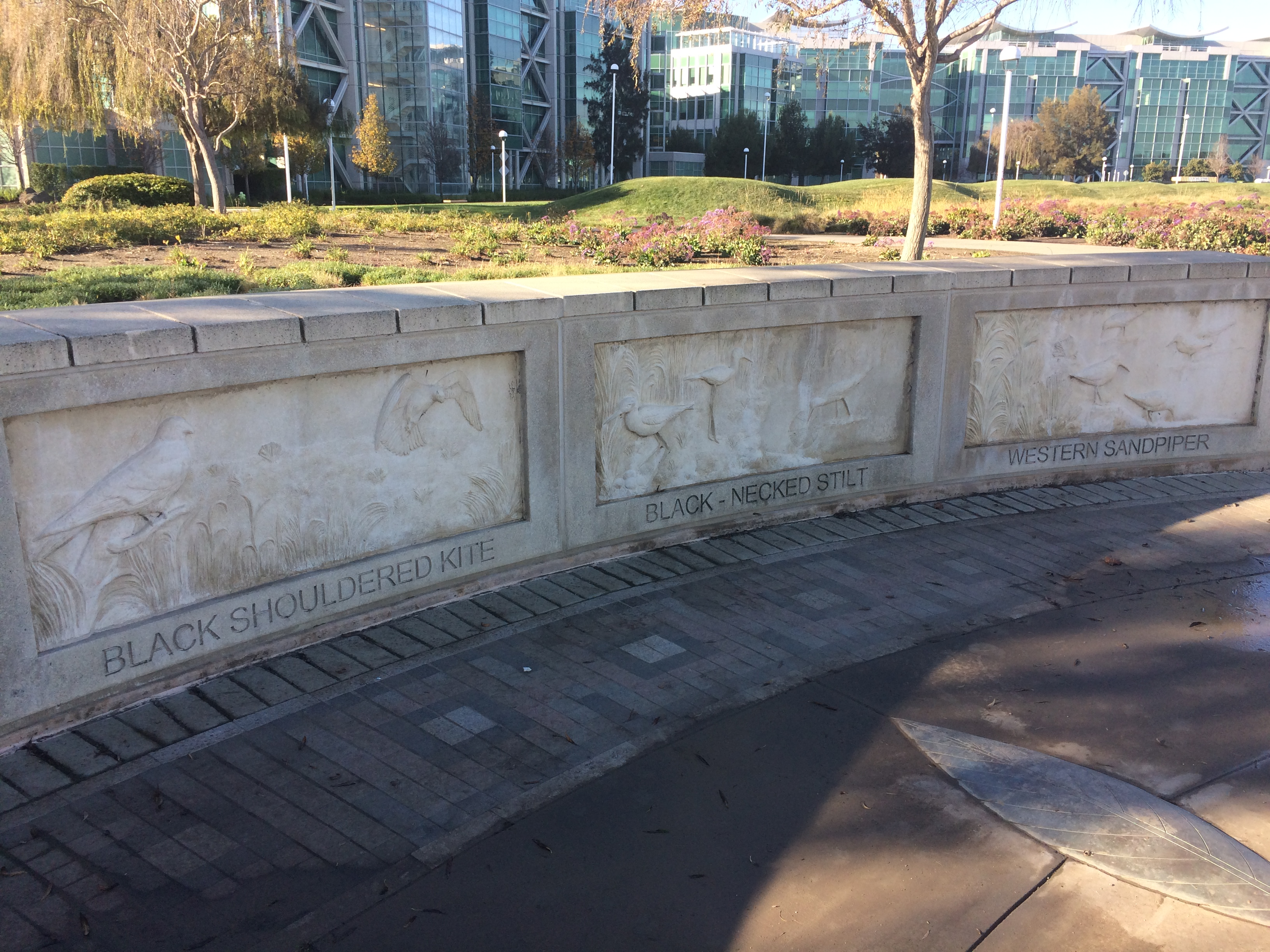
Art along the public shore access

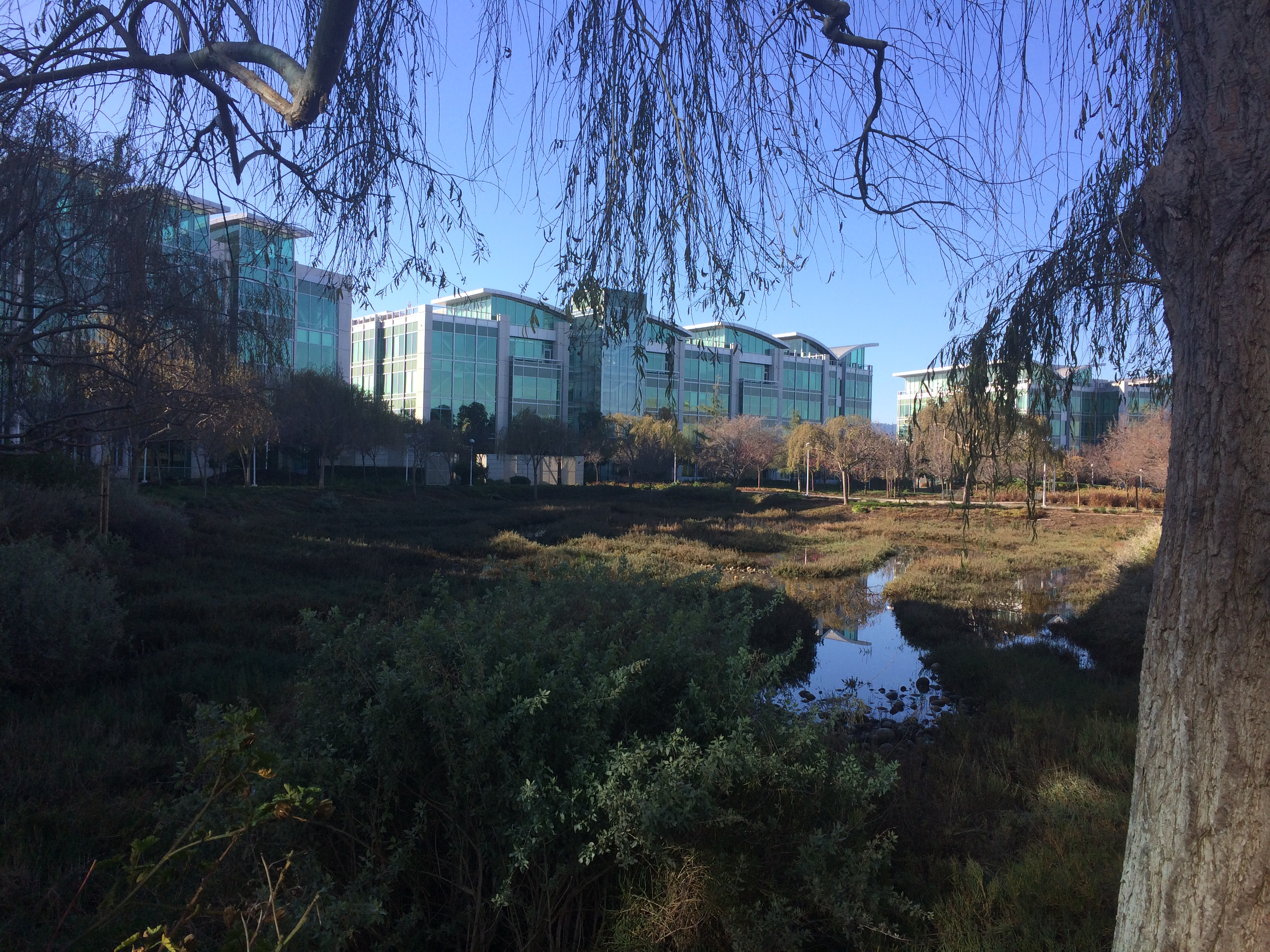
Pond inside the center

== See also ==
- Seaport Centre
- Redwood Shores
- Westpoint Harbor
