= Greco Island =

Island in California, United States

- IUCN category IV (habitat/species management area)
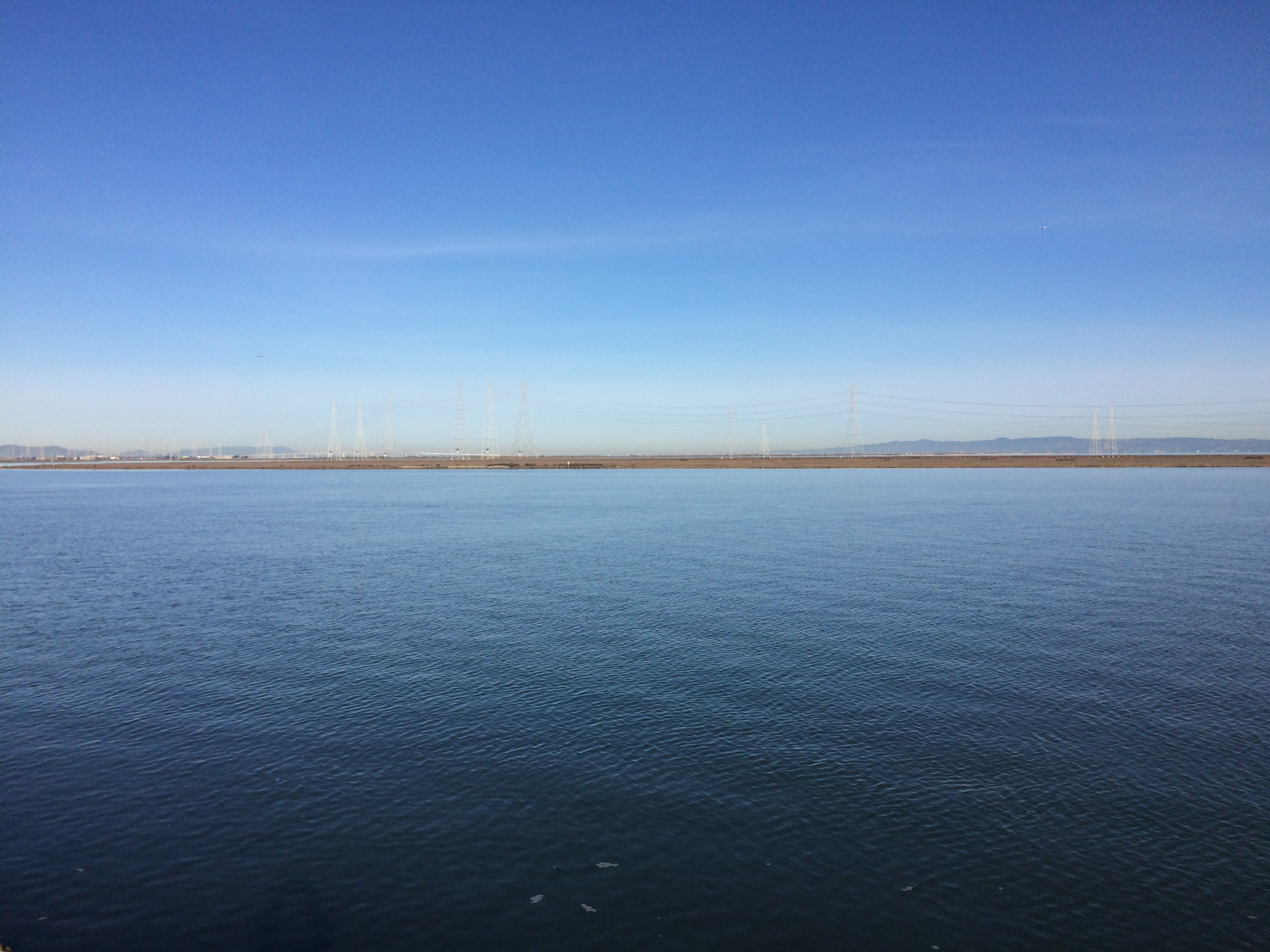
- Viewed across the Westpoint Slough

- Location within San Francisco Bay Area Location within California Location within the United States
- Location: Redwood City, California
- Coordinates: 37°31′04″N 122°10′59″W
- Area: 817 acres (331 ha)
- Designated: 1972; 54 years ago
- Governing body: Don Edwards San Francisco Bay National Wildlife Refuge
- Owner: US Fish and Wildlife Service

Greco Island is a wetland island in Redwood City, California. Greco Island is part of the larger Don Edwards San Francisco Bay National Wildlife Refuge. Westpoint Slough follows the South side of the island while Redwood Creek is along the West. The San Francisco Bay bounds the North and East sides of the island.

== History ==
Greco Island was named after a longtime resident of the island who lived there until he died of a stroke. The Bank of Italy, to whom the land had been mortgaged, then sold it to the Leslie Salt Company.

San Mateo County plans from 1969 called for continued development of the Port of Redwood City area with recreational facilities by acquiring the land on Greco Island.

Greco Island was one of the first areas along with Fremont, Mowry Slough, and Alviso to be included in a proposal for The San Francsico Bay National Wildlife Refuge in 1972.

In 2007 a report on the shoreline of the island determined that it was composed of fine sediment forming extensive mudflats that are submerged during high tide. This shore is sensitive to erosion from waves and nearby marine traffic and of concern if traffic were to increase. The waters bordering Greco are frequently traveled by vessels from both the Port of Redwood City and Westpoint Harbor.

In more recent years concerns over sea level rising have encouraged more active recovery of marshland in the bay including the areas surrounding the island.

== Wildlife ==
The endangered Salt marsh harvest mouse is one of many species that lives upon Greco Island.

A pair of Short-eared owls was confirmed living on the island in 1994.

Harbor seals in the bay visit the island for their hauling-out.

Another endangered animal, the California clapper rail uses Greco Island and nearby Westpoint Slough as a habitat.

== Gallery ==
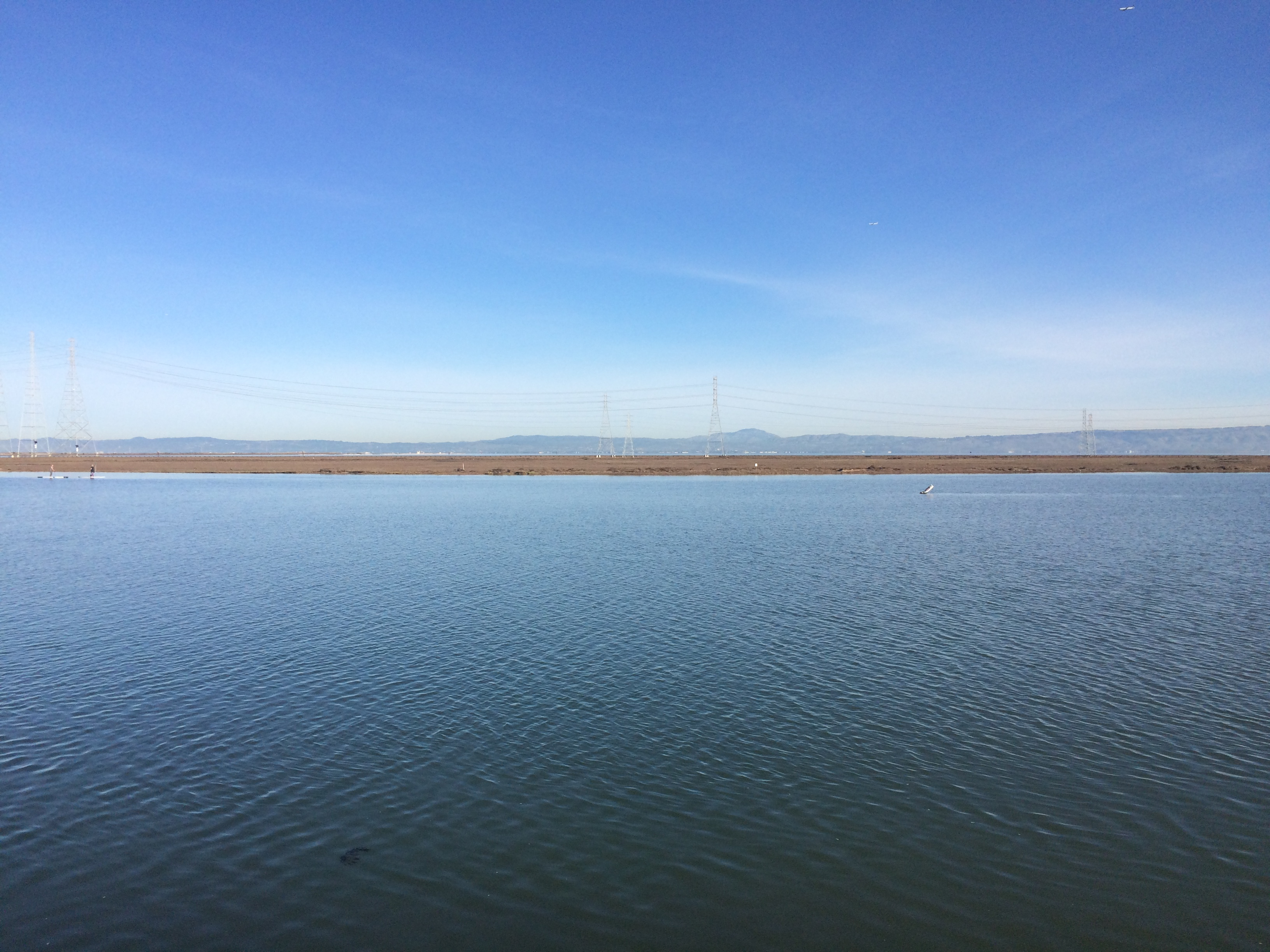
Marshland above high tide

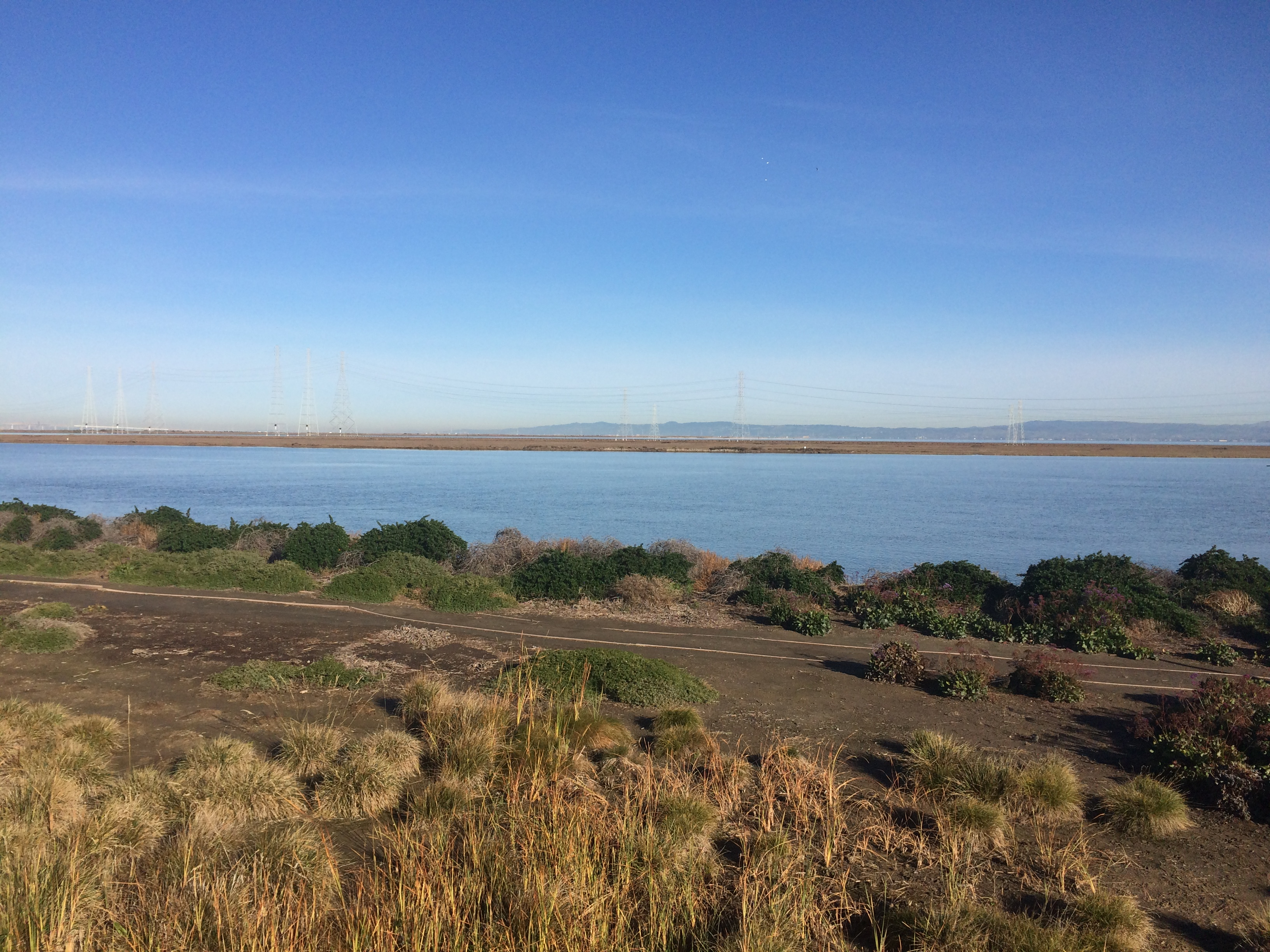
Viewed from Pacific Shores Center

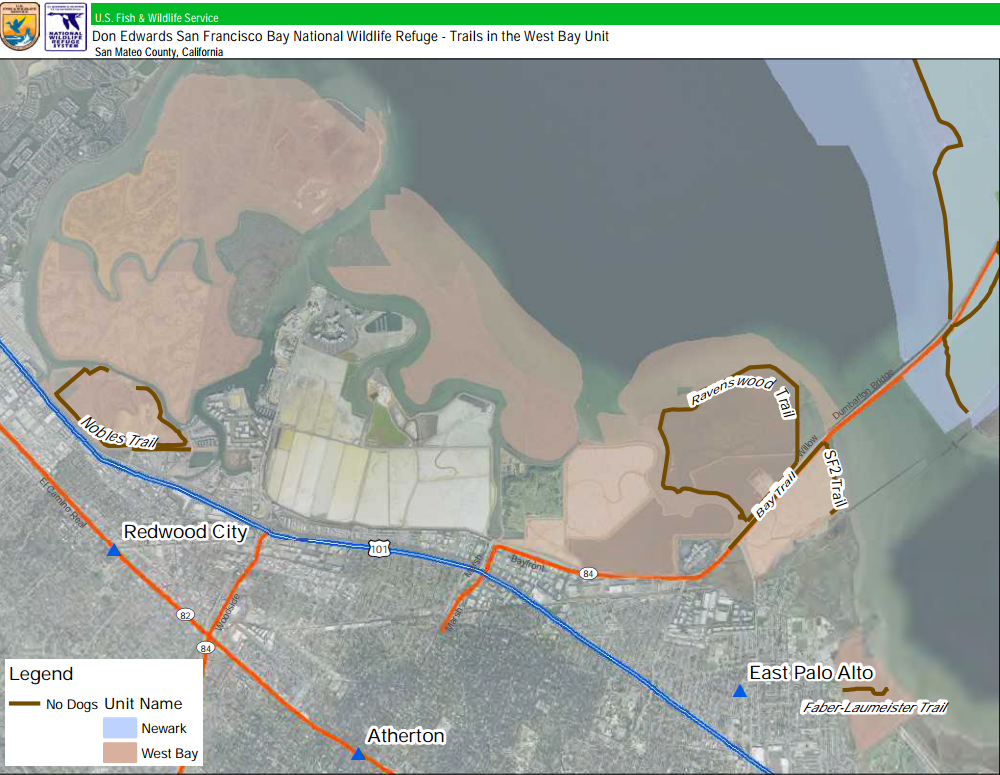
Greco Island at center with nearby trails

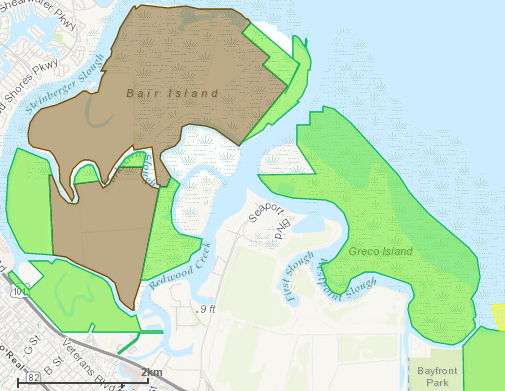
Boundary of Greco Island in refuge

== See also ==
- Bair Island
- Mowry Slough
- Westpoint Harbor
