= Mowry Slough =

River delta in the San Francisco Bay, US

- IUCN category IV (habitat/species management area)
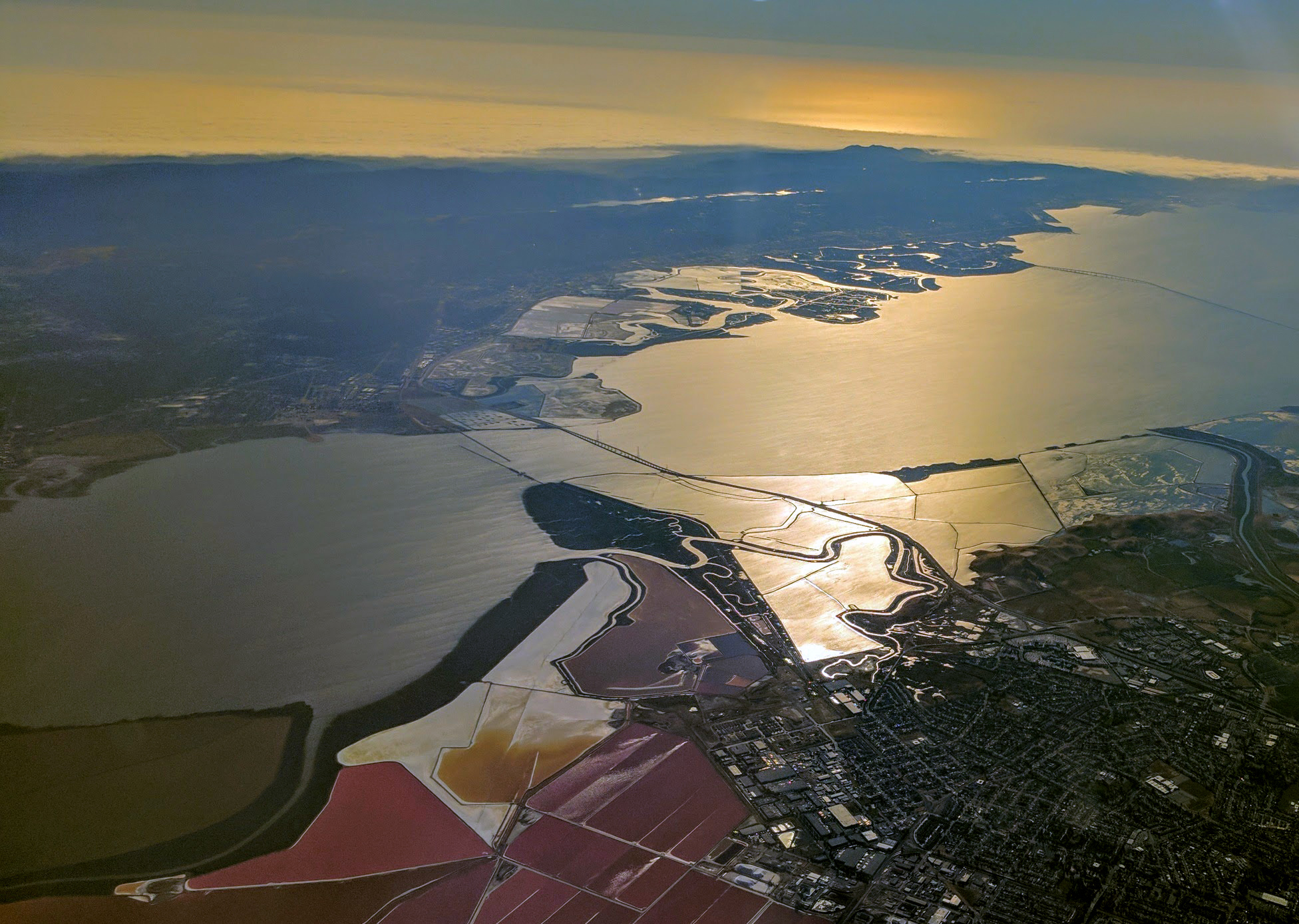
- The Mowry Slough (lower center) where it meanders between salt ponds in the south San Francisco Bay, including the Don Edwards San Francisco Bay National Wildlife Refuge and the Dumbarton Bridge, with Peninsula cities in the background

- Location within San Francisco Bay Area Location within California Location within the United States
- Location: Fremont, California
- Coordinates: 37°29′01″N 122°01′11″W
- Designated: 1972; 54 years ago
- Governing body: Don Edwards San Francisco Bay National Wildlife Refuge
- Owner: US Fish and Wildlife Service

Mowry Slough is a 5.8-mile-long (9.3 km) slough in Don Edwards San Francisco Bay National Wildlife Refuge and is the primary breeding ground for San Francisco Bay harbor seals. It is situated among the salt marshes and salt evaporation ponds in the city of Fremont.

== See also ==
- List of watercourses in the San Francisco Bay Area
- Bair Island
- Greco Island
