= Seaport Centre =

Business park

- Seaport Centre Logo
- Interactive map of Seaport Centre
- Location: Redwood City, California
- Coordinates: 37°30′06″N 122°13′03″W
- Opening date: 1980s
- Owner: Segro
- Website: www.seaportcentre.com

Seaport Centre is a high-tech business park located in Redwood City, California, United States, and as of 2007 is one of the largest biotechnology research complexes in the San Francisco Bay Area.

The property consists of 623,000 square feet (57,900 m^{2}) of developed building area, and is situated in proximity to the Port of Redwood City. The property is classified as Class A office space and is constructed as a series of separate buildings. The original lands of the Seaport Centre were used as salt evaporation ponds on tidal lands of the San Francisco Bay, a land use that started sometime prior to 1940. As of 2002 leasing rates at Seaport Centre were in the range of $27 per square foot per annum. In 2005, Slough Estates, a United Kingdom-based REIT, purchased the entirety of Seaport Centre to develop it as a biotechnology research center to compete with the existing biotech hubs in Silicon Valley and South San Francisco.

The Seaport Centre is located on generally level ground at approximately 25 feet (8 m) above mean sea level. Stormwater surface runoff is pumped from Seaport Centre to discharge into Redwood Creek.

== Aerial photographic history ==
Due to the large scale of this area and its historical lack of accessibility, the area history can be revealed well with aerial photographic records. In 1989, the firm of Earth Metrics Incorporated conducted a review of historic aerial photographs dating back to 1956.(Earth Metrics, 1989) The Seaport Centre site and its environs, as of the 1956 aerial stereo photo, were essentially undeveloped, although extensive salt evaporation ponds were evident on site. Redwood City Planning Department records confirm that the site was used for salt evaporation since sometime prior to World War II.

Analysis of five sets of time staged stereo pairs of aerial photos reveal that the Seaport Centre site remained undeveloped until 1982; up until that time, city records show that the site was zoned as "Tidal Plain", a designation not allowing urban development. Area land use gradually changed from 1956 until 1982, in the form of gradual building development in the local area. As early as 1956 a rail spur is evident, which served the loading of raw sea salt for export from the area. No agricultural history is associated with the site, other than the salt harvesting.

== Tenants ==
Since development of Seaport Centre in the early 1980s there has been a consistent trend of the property's use as a research and development hub for the biotech industry. In a 1989 tenant survey, some of the principal tenants present were: Vascualar Interventions Inc., Genelabs Incorporated, Precision Images Inc., Invitron, Charles Evans Inc., ICT Corporation, Resound Incorporated, Ideon Corporation, Cygnus Research Corp, Color Prep, Aurora Systems Inc., Abekas Video Systems Inc., Personics Inc., Instor Corporation and Visucom, Inc.

A number of these early firms utilized a variety of hazardous materials in their normal processes. These substances included a variety of toxic solvents and other organic chemicals such as acetone, benzene, methyl ethyl ketone and toluene. Use of such chemicals on site is considered a risk, since the brackish groundwater at the Seaport Centre is shallow.

Current tenants still largely focus on the medical and health fields and include: AcelRx Pharmaceuticals, Bavarian Nordic, Codexis, Genomic Health, Guardant Health, Gynesonics, Minerva Surgical, OncoMed, Stem Cell Theranostics, and Teva.

== Gallery ==
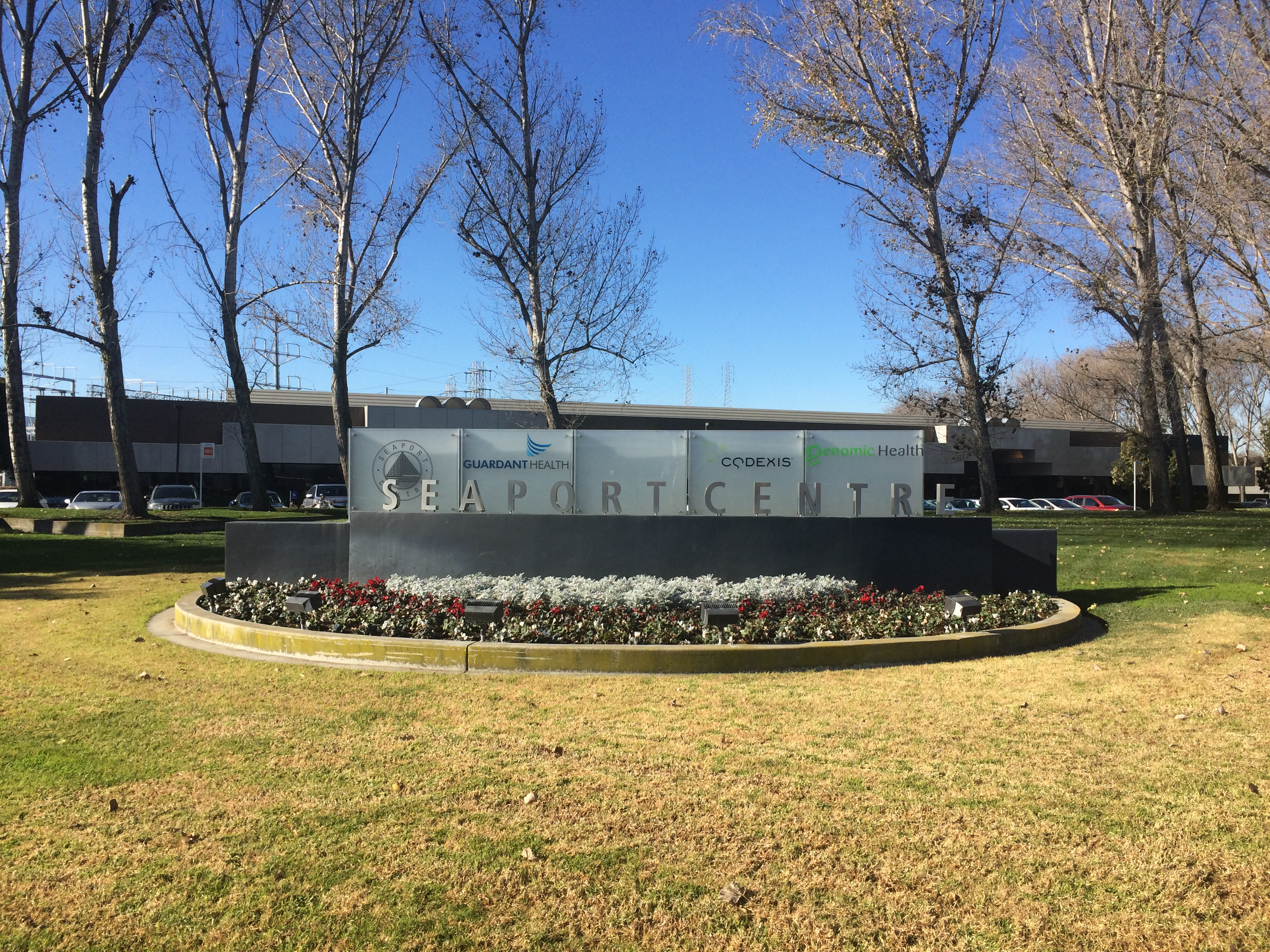
Front entrance sign

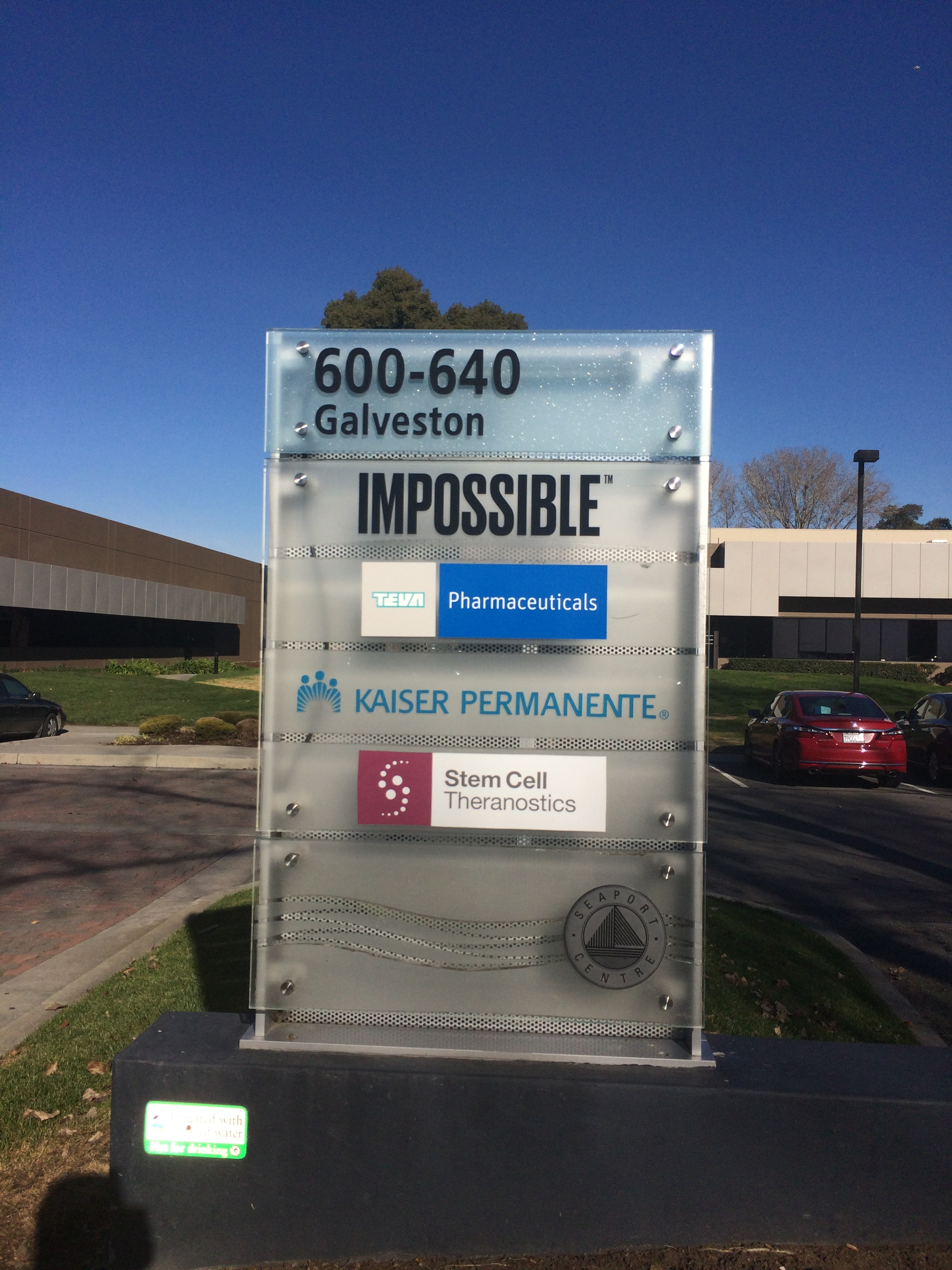
Business listing sign

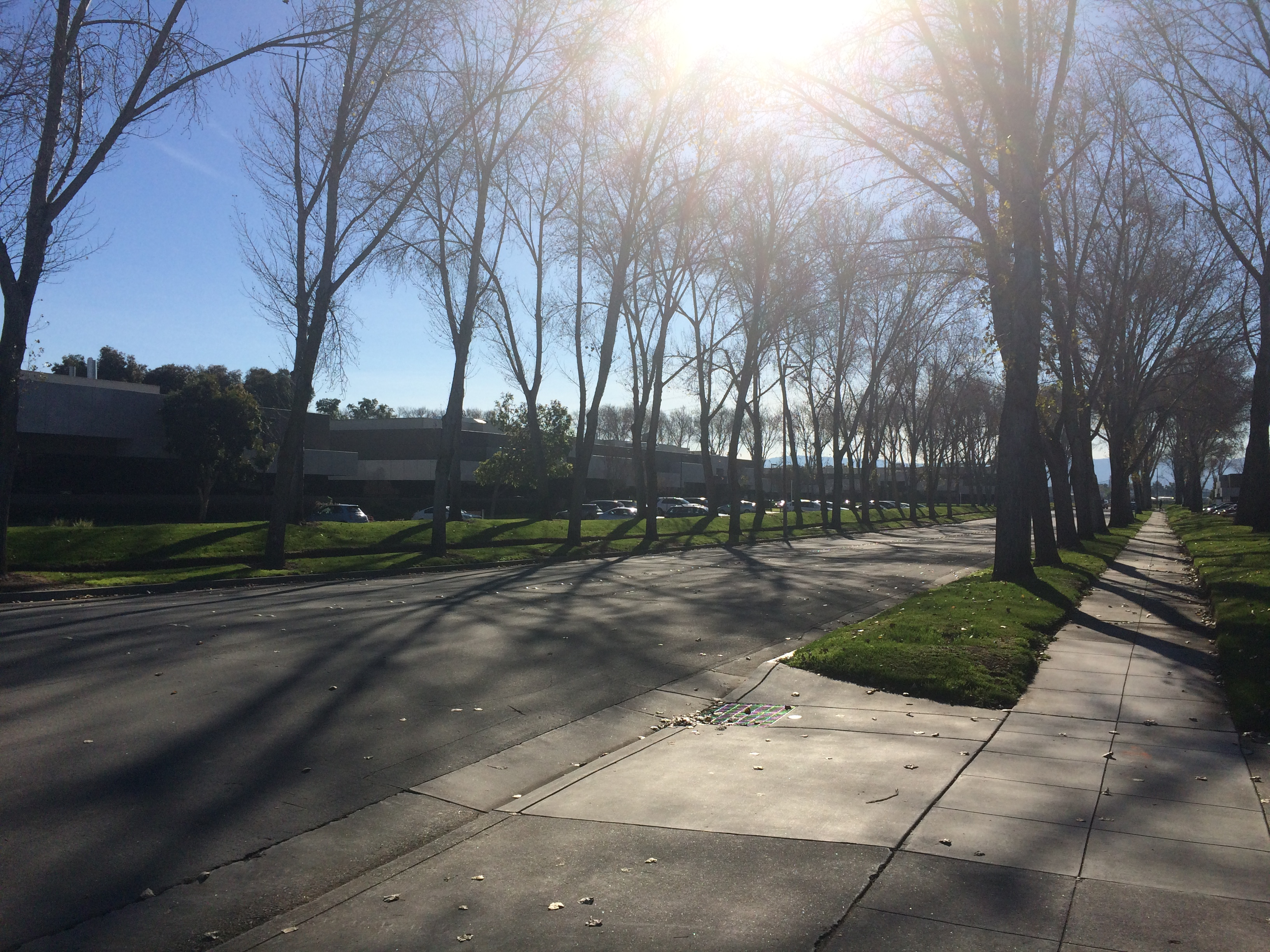
View East on Saginaw Drive

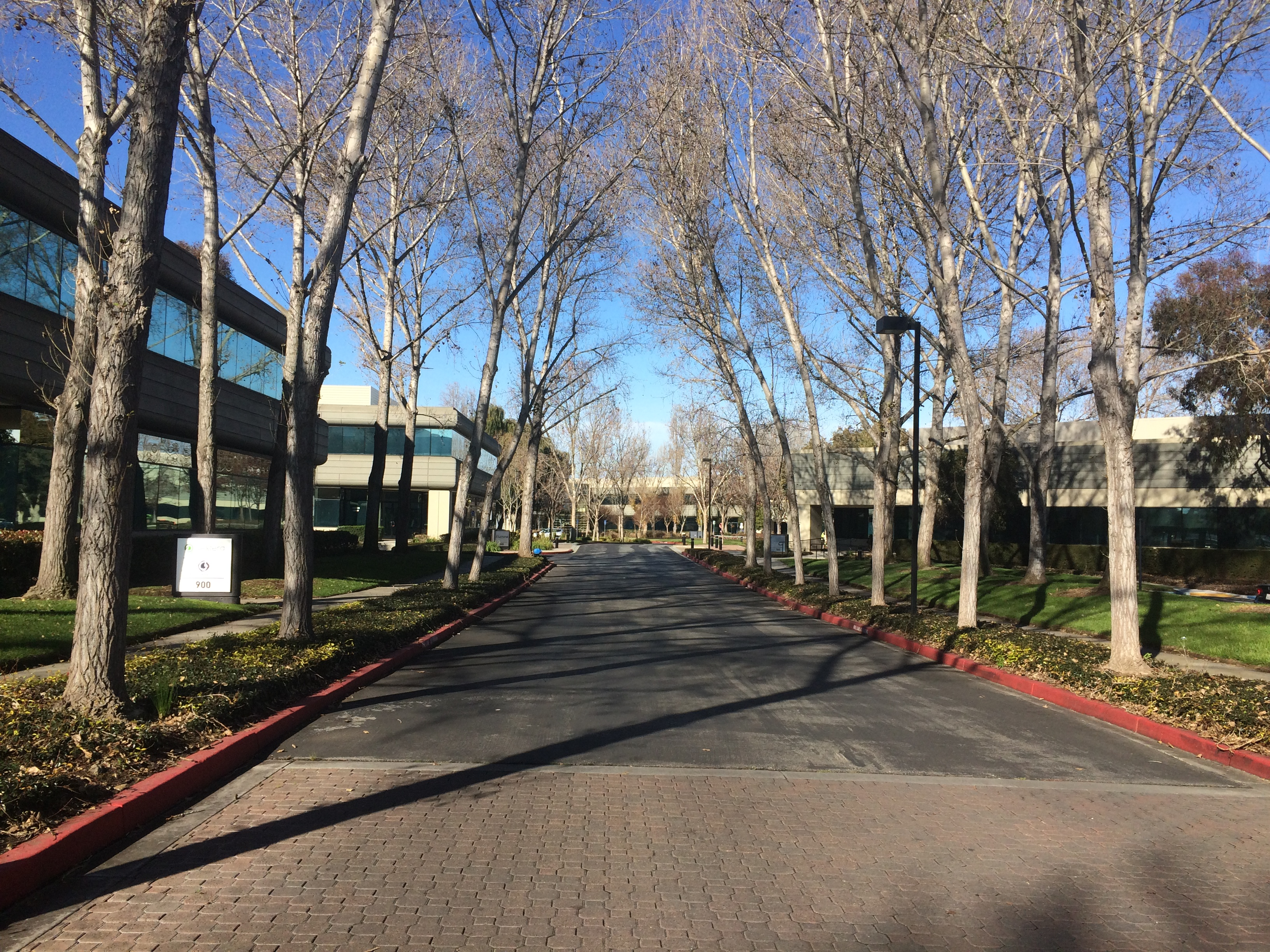
View down Saginaw Drive

== See also ==
- Bair Island
- Seal Slough
- Westpoint Slough
