= Sarah Radcliffe =

Sarah Radcliffe may refer to:

- Sarah A. Radcliffe, professor of geography
- Sarah Radclyffe, English film producer sometimes credited as Sarah Radcliffe

== See also ==
- Sara Radcliffe, American medical research advocate and business executive
