= Brontictuzumab =

Chemical compound

Monoclonal antibody
- Type: Whole antibody
- Source: Humanized (from mouse)
- Target: Notch 1

Clinical data
- Other names: OMP-52M51
- ATC code: none

Identifiers
- CAS Number: 1447814-75-6
- ChemSpider: none
- UNII: UNY2TQA40E
- KEGG: D11229

Chemical and physical data
- Formula: C_{6392}H_{9862}N_{1980}O_{1710}S_{50}
- Molar mass: 143410.36 g·mol^{−1}

Brontictuzumab (INN; development code OMP-52M51) is a humanized monoclonal antibody designed for the treatment of cancer.

It blocks the NOTCH1 receptor.

This drug was developed by OncoMed Pharmaceuticals.
