= Sara Radcliffe =

American medical research advocate

- Born: Madison, Wisconsin
- Education: MPH, MA, Johns Hopkins University; BA, Wellesley College
- Occupations: President & CEO
- Employer: California Life Sciences Association
- Spouse: J.D. Kleinke

Sara Radcliffe is an American medical research advocate and business executive. She is the president and CEO of California Life Sciences Association, a non-profit organization that advocates for the medical research mission of the life sciences sector of California. She is best known for her expertise in the field of applied public health and an advocate for life sciences.

== Early life and education ==
Radcliffe was born in Madison, Wisconsin and raised in London, Ontario. Her father is David Radcliffe, a retired professor of education at the University of Western Ontario. Her mother Shanthi Radcliffe is a retired director of public health clinics in Ontario. Radcliffe returned to the United States to attend Wellesley College in Wellesley, Massachusetts. She went on to attend Johns Hopkins University where she spent a semester abroad at Oxford. Radcliffe focused on Aristotelian philosophy and Ethics and pursued parallel studies at Johns Hopkins Bloomberg School of Public Health, conducting research into health resource allocation and clinical trial design. As part of her training, she worked for the Core Services Committee of the New Zealand Ministry of Health.

== Career ==
After Johns Hopkins, Radcliffe joined SmithKline Beecham Pharmaceuticals as a research and development policy analyst in the company's alliance and technology group. Her work included evaluation and communication of DNA research and Pharmacogenetics. She was also employed by the Pharmaceutical Research and Manufacturers of America (PhRMA) where she worked as senior director of biologic & biotechnology and assistant vice president of pre-clinical drug safety evaluation. At PhRMA, she advocated for technologies in DNA research, including testifying before the United States Congress.

Radcliffe was appointed president and CEO of California Life Sciences Association in 2014. The CLSA was formed in conjunction with her appointment with the merger of the California Healthcare Institute and BayBIO, officially launching in 2015. At the time of her appointment, Radcliffe was the executive vice president for Biotechnology Innovation Organization, the largest trade organization to serve and represent the biotechnology industry in the United States and around the world.
