= OncoMed =

American pharmaceutical development company (2004–2019)

OncoMed Pharmaceuticals, Inc.
- Company type: Private (2004-13); Public (2013-19)
- Traded as: Nasdaq: OMED
- Industry: Pharmaceutical
- Founded: University of Michigan
- Founders: Michael Clarke; Max Wicha
- Defunct: April 23, 2019
- Fate: Acquired by Mereo BioPharma
- Headquarters: Redwood City, California, United States
- Key people: Paul Hastings (CEO); John Lewicki (R&D chief); Chuck Alaimo (Operations director)
- Revenue: US$24,700,000 (2012)
- Total assets: US$207,600,000 (2016)
- Number of employees: 83 (2013); 47 (2007)

OncoMed Pharmaceuticals, Inc. was a public American pharmaceutical development company headquartered in Redwood City, California. The company was founded in August 2004 by two University of Michigan investigators, Michael Clarke and Max S. Wicha. As of 2013, the company had 83 employees. OncoMed's drug discovery work focuses on developing "targeted antibodies against cancer stem cells". The cancer stem cell technologies on which OncoMed depends are licensed from the University of Michigan where they were developed by the founders of the company. OncoMed went public in 2013 and was listed on NASDAQ under the stock symbol OMED. In April 2019 the company was acquired by Mereo BioPharma and delisted from the Nasdaq.

== History ==
Oncomed was founded in 2004.

In 2007, Oncomed consolidated its operations located in Mountain View and Palo Alto, California onto the single headquarters campus at Seaport Centre in Redwood City. One of the buildings on the new campus was the former home of NeXT.

In 2012, OncoMed sponsored the USAN nonproprietary name vantictumab for a human IgG2 anti-Frizzled antibody, an anti-cancer therapeutic. In the same year, the company sponsored the USAN name demcizumab for a human IgG2 anti-DLL4 antibody, also an anti-cancer therapeutic.

In 2014, OncoMed entered into an anti-cancer stem cell therapeutic development agreement with Celgene encompassing demcizumab and five other biologics from OncoMed's pipeline.

As of 2013, co-founder Max Wicha was the director of the University of Michigan Comprehensive Cancer Center and remained a consultant to OncoMed, while co-founder Michael Clarke had taken up a position at Stanford University.

=== Competitors ===
In 2013, OncoMed had at least two direct competitors, both public American companies: Stemline Therapeutics and Verastem. By 2014, the list of firms pursuing therapies targeting cancer stem cells had grown to include Boston Biomedical (a subsidiary of Dainippon Sumitomo Pharma), GlaxoSmithKline, Astellas Pharma, Sanofi (the American subsidiary) and Pfizer; however, Stemline and Verastem remain the only two competitors solely focused on cancer stem cells. One analyst holds that OncoMed is the best positioned of the three companies focused on the cancer stem cell area.

== Pipeline ==
Clinical pipeline, Oct 2014
| Name | Target | ID | Clinical Phase |
|---|---|---|---|
| demcizumab | DLL4 | OMP-21M18 | II |
| tarextumab | Notch 2/3 | OMP-59R5 | II |
| vantictumab | Fzd7 | OMP-18R5 | Ib |
| ipafricept | Fzd8-fc | OMP-54F28 | Ib |
| brontictuzumab | Notch1 | OMP-52M51 | I |
| unnamed | DLL4/VEGF | OMP-305B83 | I |
| unnamed | RSPO3 | OMP-131R10 | I |

As of January 2017, Oncomed had seven clinical-stage drugs in development and four discovery-stage investigations; no OncoMed therapies have made it to market yet. Two candidate drugs being co-developed with Bayer, ipafricept and vantictumab, showed in mid-2014 indications of "causing mild-to-moderate bone-related side effects" among Phase I clinical trial participants, an observation which led the company to halt enrollment and dosing in the trials, and which contributed to a sharp decline in share price.

Demcizumab, OMP-305B83, and OMP-131R10 are being developed in collaboration with Celgene. Tarextumab and brontictuzumab are being developed in collaboration with GlaxoSmithKline Vantictumab and ipafricept are being developed in collaboration with Bayer.

== Corporate governance ==
In 2013, OncoMed's chief executive officer (CEO) was Paul Hastings, who took the post in 2006. As of 2007, the company's head of R&D was John Lewicki, and the director of operations was Chuck Alaimo. While serving as OncoMed's CEO, Hastings was also a member of the board of directors for the California Healthcare Institute and the Bay Area Biosciences Association, as well as chairing the board of the Biotechnology Industry Organization.
