= California Healthcare Institute =

American non-profit organization

CHI-California Healthcare Institute is a private, non-profit public policy research and advocacy organization, representing more than 250 universities, academic research centers, biotechnology, and medical device companies. Founded in 1993, and based in La Jolla, California, CHI has offices in Washington, D.C., and Sacramento, California. CHI publishes an annual California Biomedical Industry report, providing data on the scope and scale of academic and commercial life sciences research and development within the state. In 2008, the industry employed more than 270,000 Californians and produced revenues in excess of $75 billion.

== FDA device approval reform ==
CHI published a study, Competitiveness and Regulation: The FDA and the Future of America’s Biomedical Industry, which concluded that device approval times had increased, that approval times in the European Union were faster than those in the U.S., and that "inefficiency at the FDA had resulted in American inventions made available to patients and physicians in other countries first ... [and] has pushed jobs and revenues offshore."

This report was presented at an oversight hearing of the House of Representatives, Committee on Energy and Commerce, on FDA medical device regulation.

The report defended the expedited approval process for devices and said that "Devices, in contrast, may be altered in minor ways -- switching to a new metal alloy, installing a longer-lasting battery, using a better polymer -- so that the effects on the product's safety and efficacy profile are predictable."

The Democratic members of the committee submitted the report to editors of major peer-reviewed journals for evaluation.

== CHI Board of Directors ==
CHI's Chairman is Carl Hull, president and chief executive officer, Gen-Probe, Inc.; its President and CEO is David Gollaher.

Board members include:

- Susan M. Baxter, Ph.D., executive director, California State University
- David W. Beier, senior vice president, global government affairs and corporate affairs, Amgen
- Ken Berger, president, specialty diagnostics business, Thermo Fisher Scientific
- Michael V. Drake, M.D., chancellor, University of California, Irvine
- John M. Dunn, executive vice president, new ventures, Biogen Idec
- Peter C. Farrell, Ph.D., DSc, AM, executive chairman of the board, ResMed
- David D. Fleming, group senior vice president and corporate officer, Genzyme Corporation
- Michael A. Friedman, M.D., president and CEO, City of Hope
- Robert B. Hance, president, Abbott Vascular
- Paul Hastings, president and chief executive officer, OncoMed Pharmaceuticals;
- Terry Hermiston, Ph.D., vice president, U.S. Biologics Research Site Head, U.S. Innovation Center, Bayer Healthcare Pharmaceuticals
- Steve Krognes, senior vice president and chief financial officer, Genentech
- Peter Barton Hutt, partner, Covington & Burling
- Tracy T. Lefteroff, National Life Sciences Partner, PricewaterhouseCoopers
- Marcea B. Lloyd, senior vice president, government and corporate affairs and general counsel, Amylin Pharmaceuticals
- John C. Martin, Ph.D., chairman of the board and CEO, Gilead Sciences
- Dana G. Mead Jr., partner, Kleiner Perkins Caufield & Byers
- Peter G. Milner, M.D., president, co-founder, member board of directors, ARYx Therapeutics, Inc.
- Michael A. Mussallem, chairman and CEO, Edwards Lifesciences
- Christian W. Nolet, partner and life sciences leader, west region, Ernst & Young
- Michael Onuscheck, president and senior vice president, neuromodulation, Boston Scientific
- Richard P. Patrylak, senior vice president, customer sales, marketing and policy, Merck & Company
- David E.I. Pyott, chairman of the board and CEO, Allergan
- William E. Rhodes, worldwide president, BD Biosciences
- John D. Stobo, M.D., senior vice president for health sciences and services, University of California
- Katie M. Szyman, senior vice president and president, diabetes, Medtronic Diabetes
- Eric J. Topol, director, Scripps Translational Science Institute; chief academic officer, Scripps Health; vice chairman, West Wireless Health Institute
- Keith C. Valentine, president and COO, NuVasive, Inc.

CHI Membership Members include the University of California, Amgen, University of California, Irvine, Biogen Idec, Stanford, Amgen, Genentech and Gilead Sciences.
