= Vantictumab =

Monoclonal antibody

Monoclonal antibody
- Type: ?
- Source: Human
- Target: Frizzled receptor

Clinical data
- Routes of administration: IV
- ATC code: none

Identifiers
- CAS Number: 1345009-45-1
- ChemSpider: none
- UNII: 88WBI2D80S
- KEGG: D10410

Chemical and physical data
- Formula: C_{6322}H_{9722}N_{1674}O_{1988}S_{46}
- Molar mass: 142461.81 g·mol^{−1}

Vantictumab /vænˈtɪktʊmæb/ is a human IgG2 monoclonal antibody designed for the treatment of cancer.

This drug was developed by OncoMed Pharmaceuticals Inc. in partnership with Bayer. OncoMed was awarded a patent in 2016, which is set to expire in 2029. In April 2017, Bayer terminated its option to license vantictumab.

It inhibits wnt signalling by targeting the frizzled receptors on cancer cells.

Phase I trials have been completed for pancreatic cancer, non-small cell lung cancer, and breast cancer. In 2016 results were reported from a phase 1b clinical trial for triple-negative breast cancer and in 2020 for pancreatic cancer.
