= David E. I. Pyott =

British CEO

David Edmund Ian Pyott
- Born: 1953 (age 72–73); London, U.K.
- Education: University of Edinburgh; London Business School; University College London
- Occupation: Businessman

David Edmund Ian Pyott CBE (born 1953) was the CEO of Allergan, a pharmaceutical company from 1998 to 2015, when Allergan was acquired by Actavis. In 2014 he was one of the 25 highest-paid CEOs in the United States.

== Early life ==
Pyott was born in 1953 in London, England. His parents were from Scotland; and, as a child, he lived in India, where his father worked in the sugar industry.

Pyott received a Master of Arts degree from the University of Edinburgh in 1975 and a diploma in international and European law from the Europa Institute at the University of Amsterdam. He received a Master of Business Administration from the London Business School and an MS from the University College London in 1980.

== Career ==
Pyott worked for Sandoz Nutrition at various jobs from 1980 until 1990. From 1990 to 1992, Pyott served as the general manager of Sandoz Nutrition in Barcelona, Spain. From 1992 until 1995, he was the president and chief executive officer of Sandoz Nutrition Corporation. In 1995 Pyott transferred from Sandoz and joined Novartis AG, upon the merger of Sandoz and Ciba Geigy where he was head of the Nutrition Division until December 1997. On January 1, 1998, he joined Allergan, which at that time was a small eye care business. As of 2014, Pyott was one of the longest tenured pharmaceutical CEOs. Under his leadership Allergan grew from a small eye care business to an international pharmaceutical and medical device company that earns over $5 billion a year.

In 1998, Pyott joined the board of Allergan and became chairman in 2001, ending his board tenure upon Actavis's acquisition of the company. He was a member of the board of Avery Dennison from November 1999 until March 2020. He served on the board of Edwards Lifesciences Corporation from 2000 to 2014 and was a board member of Pacific Life from 2005 until 2007. Pyott was chairman of California Healthcare Institute in 2003 and again in July 2012. As of June 2024, Pyott serves as a vice president of the Ophthalmology Foundation, having previously served as president. He is a member of the board of the Pan American Ophthalmological Foundation, and president of the advisory board of the Foundation of the American Academy of Ophthalmology. He also serves on the boards of BioMarin Pharmaceutical, Alnylam Pharmaceuticals, Royal Philips, and Pliant Therapeutics. He is chairman of the governing board of London Business School and a member of the executive committee and board of trustees of Caltech. He is also Hospitaller of the priory in the United States for the Order of St. John and a Commander of the Order, after his promotion by King Charles III in 2023.

== Allergan acquisition ==
On April 21, 2014, Bill Ackman of Pershing Square Capital Management teamed up with pharmaceutical company, Valeant Pharmaceuticals International Inc, to make a run at acquiring Allergan. Rejecting the unsolicited $46 billion offer, as CEO, Pyott defended his company. He believed selling to Valeant would not create long-term value for Allergan's shareholders due to Valeant's historic reliance on cost-cutting. Pyott is known to value aggressive research and development for Allergan, which he said had enabled Allergan to launch several new products and increase annual sales by an average of 11% since 2011. The R&D and marketing spends address consumer needs while providing value for shareholders, as was seen with Botox. The rejection by Allergan, however, did not prevent Valeant and Pershing from pursuing the Botox maker further.

Originally offering $48.30 per share, Valeant increased the cash portion of its offer to $58.30 per share. Pyott and Allergan, standing tall on their beliefs, rejected the offer citing yet again Valeant's unsustainable business model. As expected, this heated up the war between Pyott, Ackman and Valeant. In order to ward off the hostile takeover attempt, Allergan was courting other offers from companies with more sustainable business models. On November 17, 2014, Allergan announced that they had agreed to a deal with Actavis plc for $66 billion, making it one of the world's largest drug makers by sales. Pyott's decision to move forward with Actavis was based on the company's impressive management structure and desire to keep more of Allergan's research and development operation intact. After the acquisition was finalized, Pyott elected not to join the combined company's board, but stayed on as chairman of The Allergan Foundation for a year.

In July 2015, Actavis plc announced that the company adopted Allergan plc (NYSE: AGN) as the company name following the approval by Actavis shareholders on June 5. The combination of the two companies created one of the world's top 10 pharmaceutical companies by revenue and a leader in a new industry model.

As of March 15, 2015, Valeant's stock crashed more than 50%. A number of factors contributed to the collapse of Valeant, many of which validate Pyott's approach to business. Since the acquisition attempt and the subsequent fallout, Pyott's sentiments regarding Valeant have been vindicated. Some have even gone as far to call Pyott a “hero” for saving Allergan and its shareholders and fighting for what he believes in.

== Honors and awards ==
Throughout his career, Pyott has collected a number of honors and awards for his philanthropic efforts and his leadership at Allergan.

- Director of the Year Award; recognizing corporate directors for their outstanding dedication to the highest ideals of leadership in the boardroom – 2001.
- The honor of Commander of the Most Excellent Order of the British Empire (CBE) by Her Majesty the Queen for his contribution to British business excellence and management skills in the United States – 2006.
- University of California Irvine; The Medal, UCI's most prestigious honor – 2010.
- Moacyr Gold Medal for services to Brazilian ophthalmology – 2010.
- London Business School; Fellow.
- UCLA Anderson School of Management; Executive Leader of the Year – 2012.
- U.S. Marine Corps; Semper Fidelis Award – 2013.
- Harvard Business Review; 4th best-performing CEO in the World – 2014.
- United Cerebral Palsy Gala; Corporate Impact Award – 2015.
- Chapman University; Citizen of the Year Award – 2015.
- University of Edinburgh; Honorary Degree in Medicine – 2016.
- California Life Sciences Association; Pantheon Award for Life Sciences Leadership - 2016
- Chapman University; Honorary Doctor of Pharmaceutical Science – 2018.
