= Westpoint Harbor =

- Westpoint Harbor Logo
- Click on the map for a fullscreen view

Location
- Country: United States
- Location: Redwood City, California
- Coordinates: 37°30′46″N 122°11′39″W

Details
- Opened: 2008; 17 years ago
- Owned by: Mark Sanders
- Type of harbour: Artificial
- Size: ~18 acres (7.3 ha)
- No. of berths: 416 slips
- No. of wharfs: 5
- No. of piers: 6
- Draft depth: 8 feet (2.4 m)

Statistics
- Website westpointharbor.com

Westpoint Harbor is a marina that opened in 2008 at the mouth of the Westpoint Slough located in Redwood City, California.

== History ==
The first development on the site in the 19th century had been a shipbuilding yard with close proximity to a cement factory. After 1918, when the cement plant closed, Leslie Salt used the site as a holding pond for bittern.

The marina took over 19 years from when the idea was conceived originally to being constructed completely. Three years were spent obtaining the land from the owner Cargill who owns several nearby salt ponds. An additional 12 years passed obtaining permits from various agencies to commence construction which took another four years due to heavy rains.

Private commuter ferry service carries passengers from the East Bay and San Francisco to the marina, with a planned expansion for more public service in the future.

The harbor and the San Francisco Bay Conservation and Development Commission have been at odds for years over various regulations and permit enforcement with the commission in early 2018 attempting to levy more than US$500,000 (equivalent to $626,093 in 2024) in fines.

== Recreational use ==
Westpoint Harbor also hosts the Stanford University Treeathalon every year, a triathlon competition.

== Gallery ==
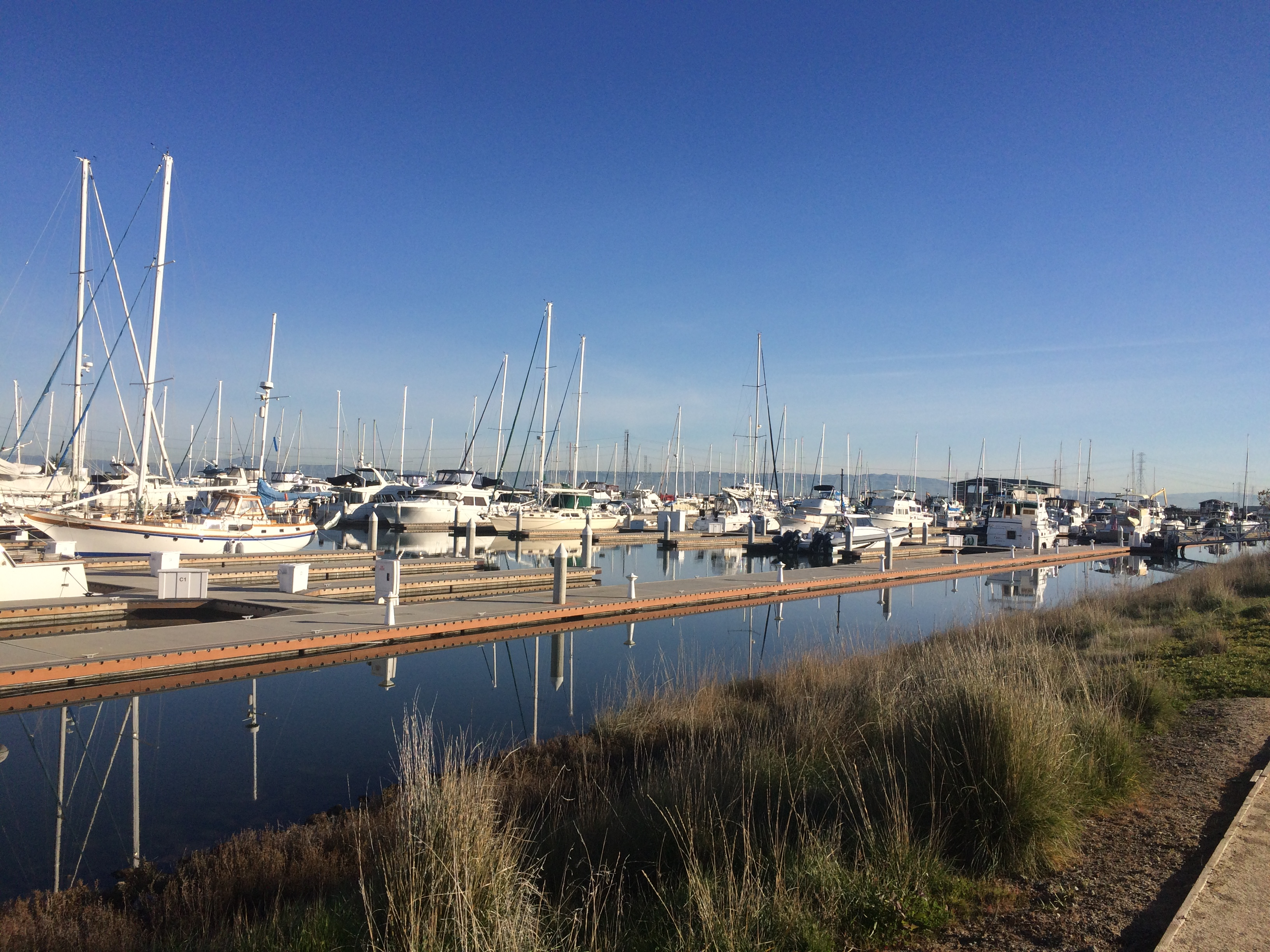
View South

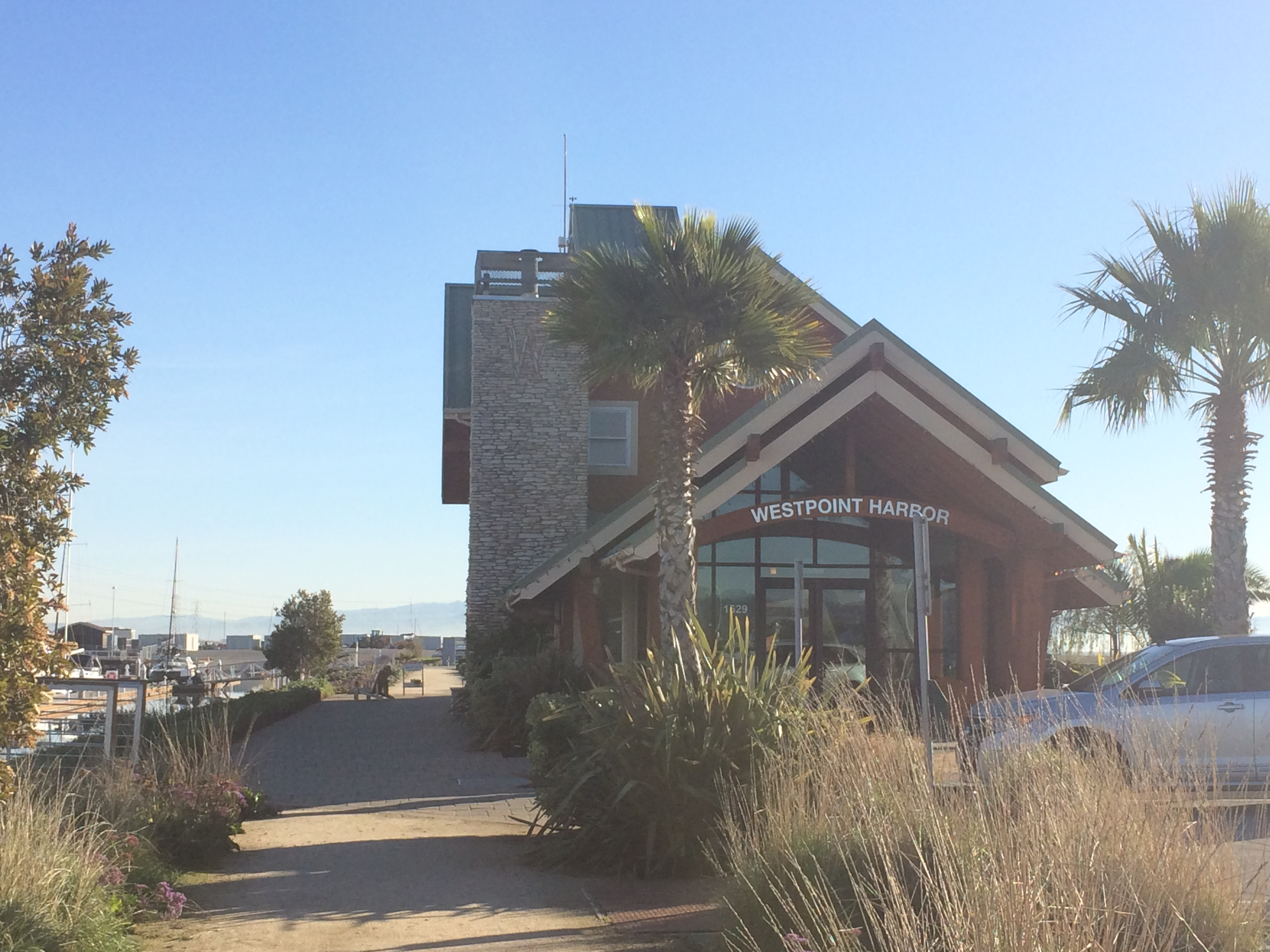
Harbor House

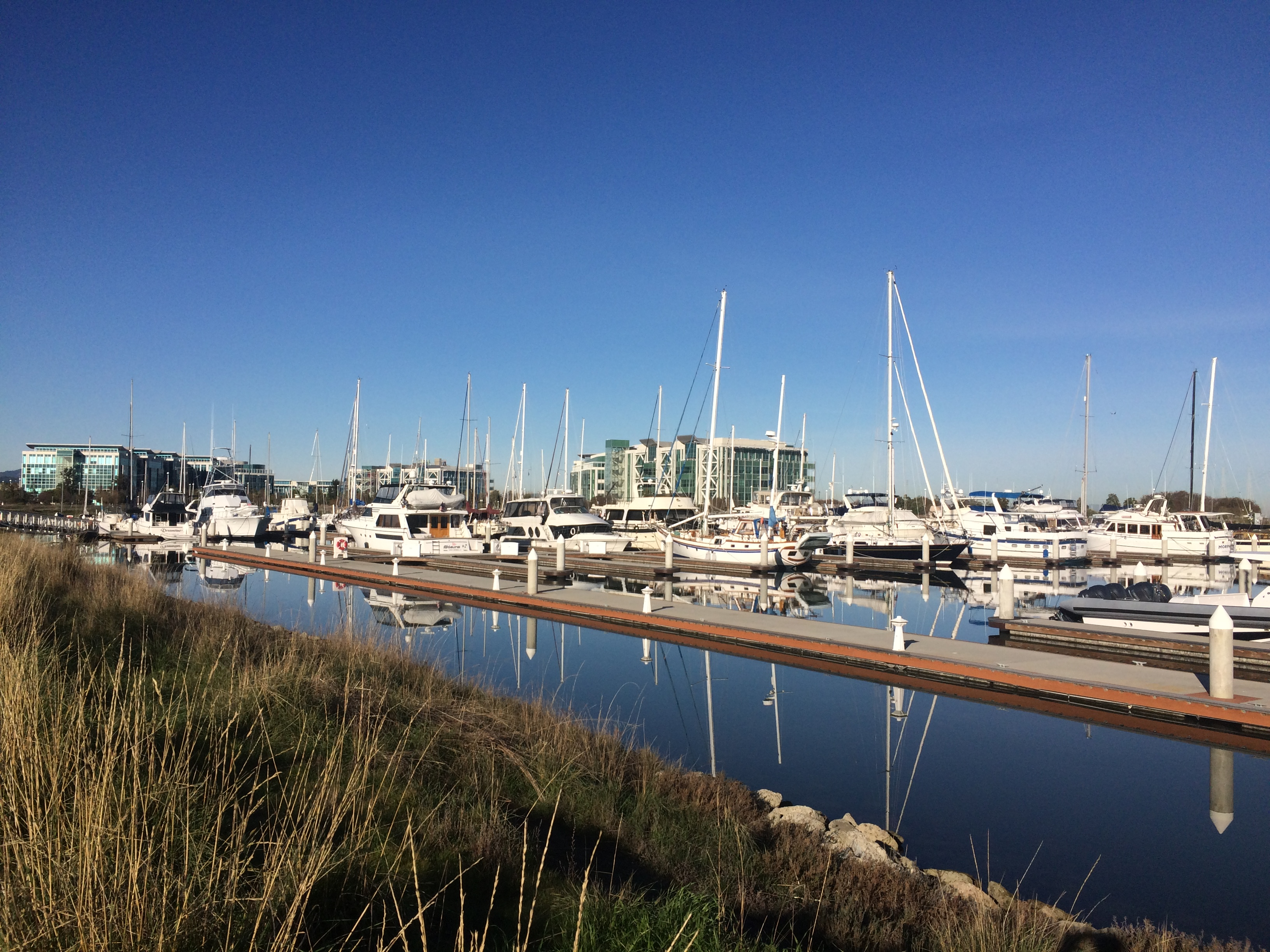
View North towards Pacific Shores Center

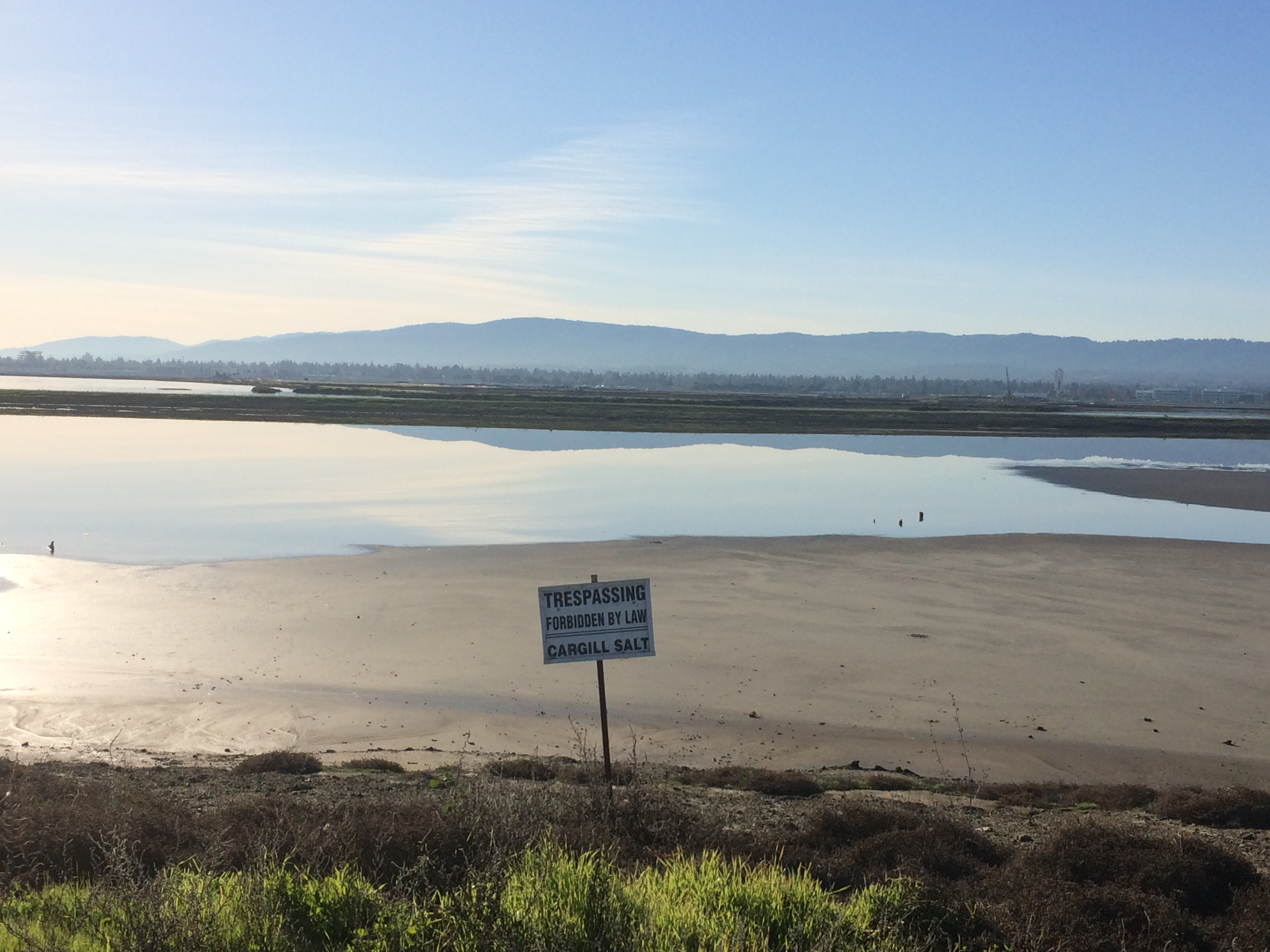
Adjacent salt ponds

== See also ==
- Port of Redwood City
- San Francisco Bay
- Greco Island
