= Westpoint Slough =

Slough feeding into Redwood Creek, US

Coordinates: 37°30′22″N 122°11′34″W

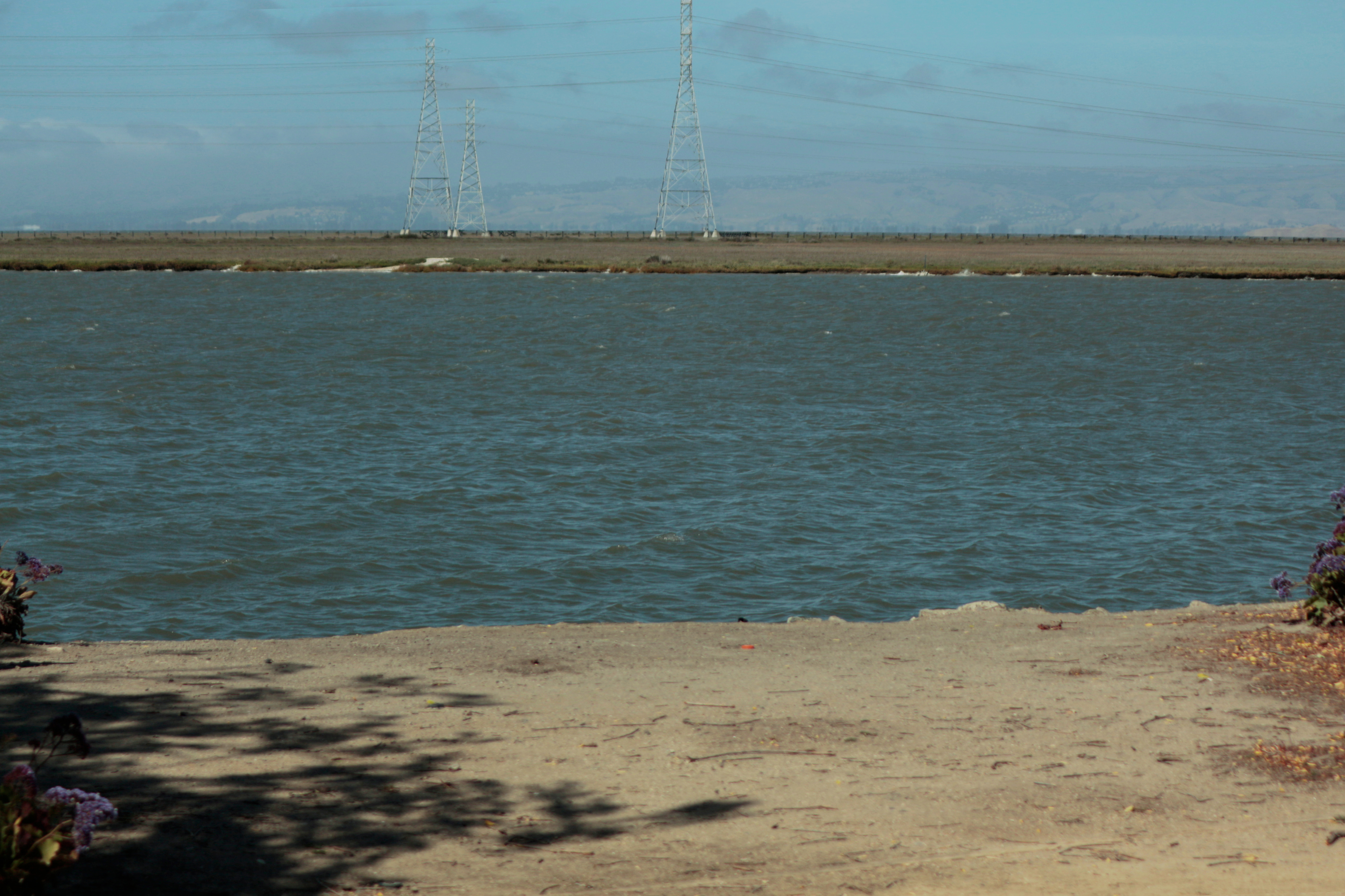
Westpoint Slough, viewed from Pacific Shores Center. On the other side, Greco Island can be seen.

Westpoint Slough is the largest of several sloughs feeding into Redwood Creek in San Mateo County, California, United States. This slough is surrounded by extensive undisturbed marshlands including Greco Island, which forms its northern boundary. The channel of Westpoint Slough contains considerable mudflat areas; moreover, both the marshes and mudflats offer considerable habitat area for local and migratory wildlife, especially birds.

Multinational corporation Cargill currently owns 1,436 acres (2.2 sq mi) of salt ponds adjacent to part of Westpoint Slough. Cargill, in conjunction with Arizona-based DMB Associates, has proposed a highly controversial development of 32,000 people and 12,000 houses on this open space.

Pacific Shores Center sits along Westpoint Slough, as does Westpoint Harbor, which is open to the public. The Port of Redwood City, the City of Redwood City, and the Water Emergency Transit Authority are proposing to construct a commuter ferry terminal along the slough.

== See also ==
- Port of Redwood City
- California clapper rail
