= Redwood Creek (San Mateo County) =

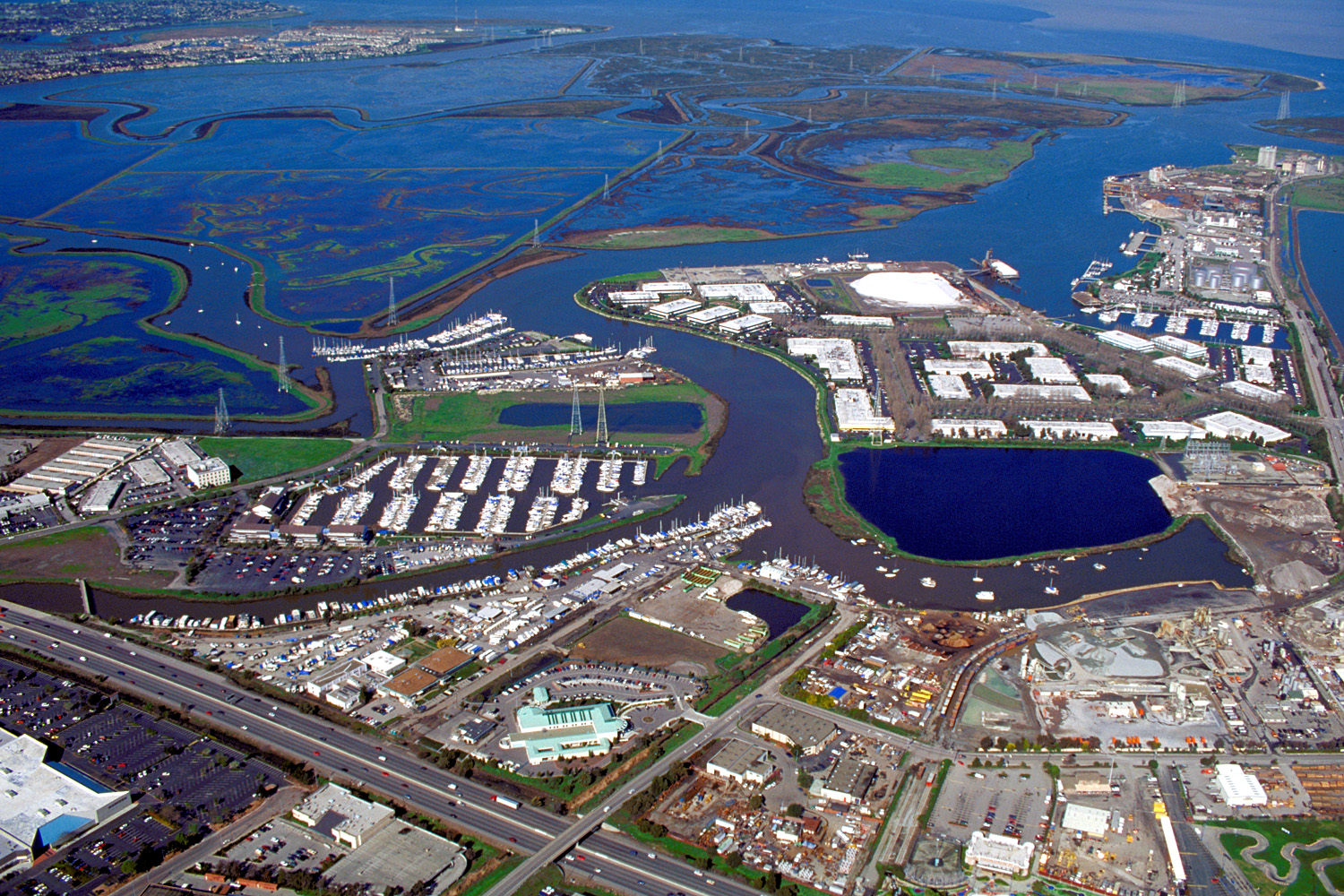
- Aerial view of the mouth of Redwood Creek on San Francisco Bay at the port of Redwood City, California

- Location of the Redwood Creek estuary in San Francisco Bay
- Etymology: Spanish language

Location
- Country: United States
- State: California
- Region: San Mateo County
- City: Redwood City, California

Physical characteristics
- Source: Arroyo Ojo De Agua
  - location: Redwood City
  - coordinates: 37°27′27.8″N 122°15′58.9″W
- 2nd source: Arroyo Salinas
  - location: Woodside, California
  - coordinates: 37°26′35.4″N 122°15′39.4″W
- Source confluence: Redwoods Embarcadero Creek
  - coordinates: 37°29′12.8″N 122°13′38.3″W
- Mouth: Redwood Slough
  - coordinates: 37°31′35.1″N 122°11′46.4″W
- Discharge
  - average: 1,370 cu ft/s (39 m^{3}/s)
  - minimum: 17 cu ft/s (0.48 m^{3}/s)
  - maximum: 14,000 cu ft/s (400 m^{3}/s)

Basin features
- Tributaries
  - left: Arroyo Ojo De Agua
  - right: Arroyo Salinas

Redwood Creek is a 9.5-mile-long (15.3 km) perennial stream located in San Mateo County, California, United States which discharges into South San Francisco Bay. The Port of Redwood City, the largest deepwater port in South San Francisco Bay, is situated on the east bank of Redwood Creek near its mouth, where the creek becomes a natural deepwater channel.

== History ==
The creek and city name, the latter first known as Red Woods City (1854), was named because of the nearby coast redwood (Sequoia sempervirens) forest and lumbering industry. In 1851, a deep-water channel that ran inland to what is now Redwood City was discovered off of San Francisco Bay. Named Redwood Creek, this channel was used by the lumber companies to ship wood and logs from the redwood forests in the peninsula hills to San Francisco. A shipbuilding industry emerged, the first schooner was built in 1851 by G.M. Burnham and appropriately named "Redwood." Wooden shipbuilding remained an active industry until the last wooden ship built in Redwood City, called the "Perseverance," was launched in 1883. The shipbuilding industry experienced a revival in 1918 with the building of the first concrete ship in America, the SS Faith.

The Port of Redwood City would be used in rebuilding efforts after the 1906 Earthquake in San Francisco. The port would continue to be a crucial area for emergency response, with FEMA designating it as a federal staging area for natural disasters in 2017. The port would also be used during WWII, as the US Navy took over the port in 1944 for its freight needs. In the 1950s, the port was used to transport 27 million tons of cargo.

== Watershed ==
Redwood Creek begins in the Woodside Glens neighborhood of Woodside, California just south of Interstate 280, below the terminus of Farm Hill Boulevard. It descends below Interstate 280 on the west side of Woodside Road, passing through the Menlo Country Club. At Alameda de las Pulgas it becomes an engineered concrete channel to El Camino Real, where it is briefly daylighted before entering underground culverts in downtown Redwood City. The primary tributary to Redwood Creek is a stream named Arroyo Ojo de Agua which meets it underground at approximately Broadway Street in Redwood City. As it crosses below US Highway 101 it becomes a tidal channel. Extensive mudflats and marsh areas are found along Redwood Creek near its mouth. Several side channel sloughs connect to Redwood Creek, the largest of which is Westpoint Slough.

== Ecology ==
Redwood Creek and Arroyo Ojo de Agua were fish sampled for steelhead trout (Oncorhynchus mykiss) in 1981, but no trout were found. The historical status of trout in the creek is unknown.

At Stulsaft Park on the Arroyo de Ojo Agua tributary, a population of endangered Fountain Thistle (Cirsium fontinale var. fontinale) was discovered in 2007, and occupies seeps associated with serpentine soils. In Stulsaft Park it is found in an opening in a coffeeberry/bay laurel woodland. The plants may grow 6 feet tall and it is only found in a handful of locations in San Mateo County.

A study conducted in 2016 that analyzed sediments in the Redwood Creek region determined that the benthic organisms in Redwood Creek were not significantly affected by the polychlorinated biphenyls (PCBs) in the sediment. However, the study determined that these PCBs could pass through the food chain and impact humans that consume fish from Redwood Creek. The study determined that these chemicals can have carcinogenic risks to the humans that consume them through fish from Redwood Creek.

In August, 2018 Grassroots Ecology Assistant Director Junko Bryant led a project with the San Jose Conservation Corps and Redwood City to remove approximately 40 non-native Canary Island date palm (Phoenix canariensis) trees from a segment of Redwood Creek in the downtown area near Kaiser Permanente. These palm trees, some over 5 feet in diameter, had overtaken the creek bank and completely obscured public views of the creek. The creek banks have been replanted with native plants, increasing biological diversity and improving visibility for ambulances accessing the hospital.

== Gallery ==
Images of the Redwood Creek Watershed

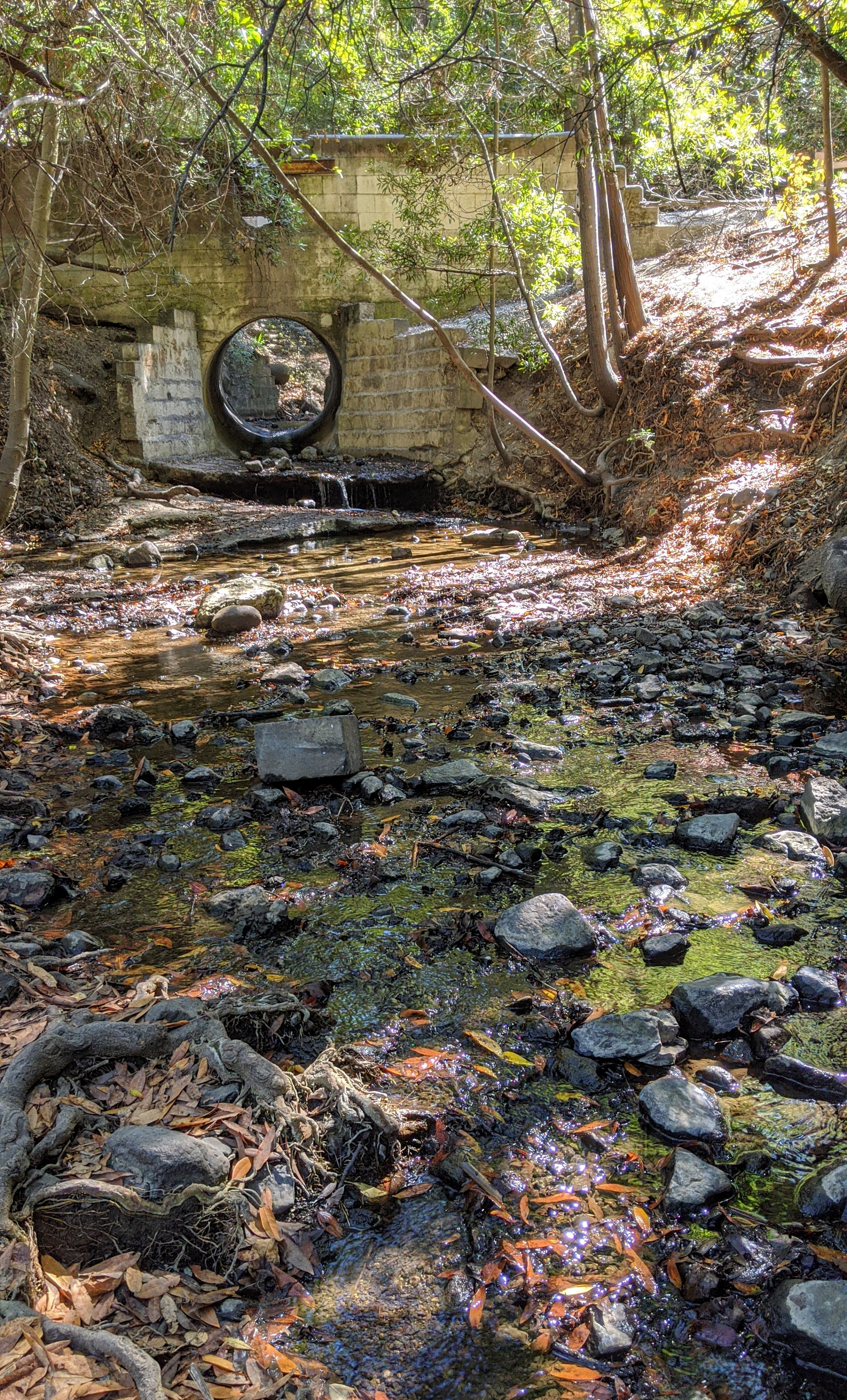
Tributary Arroyo Ojo de Agua at Stulsaft Park

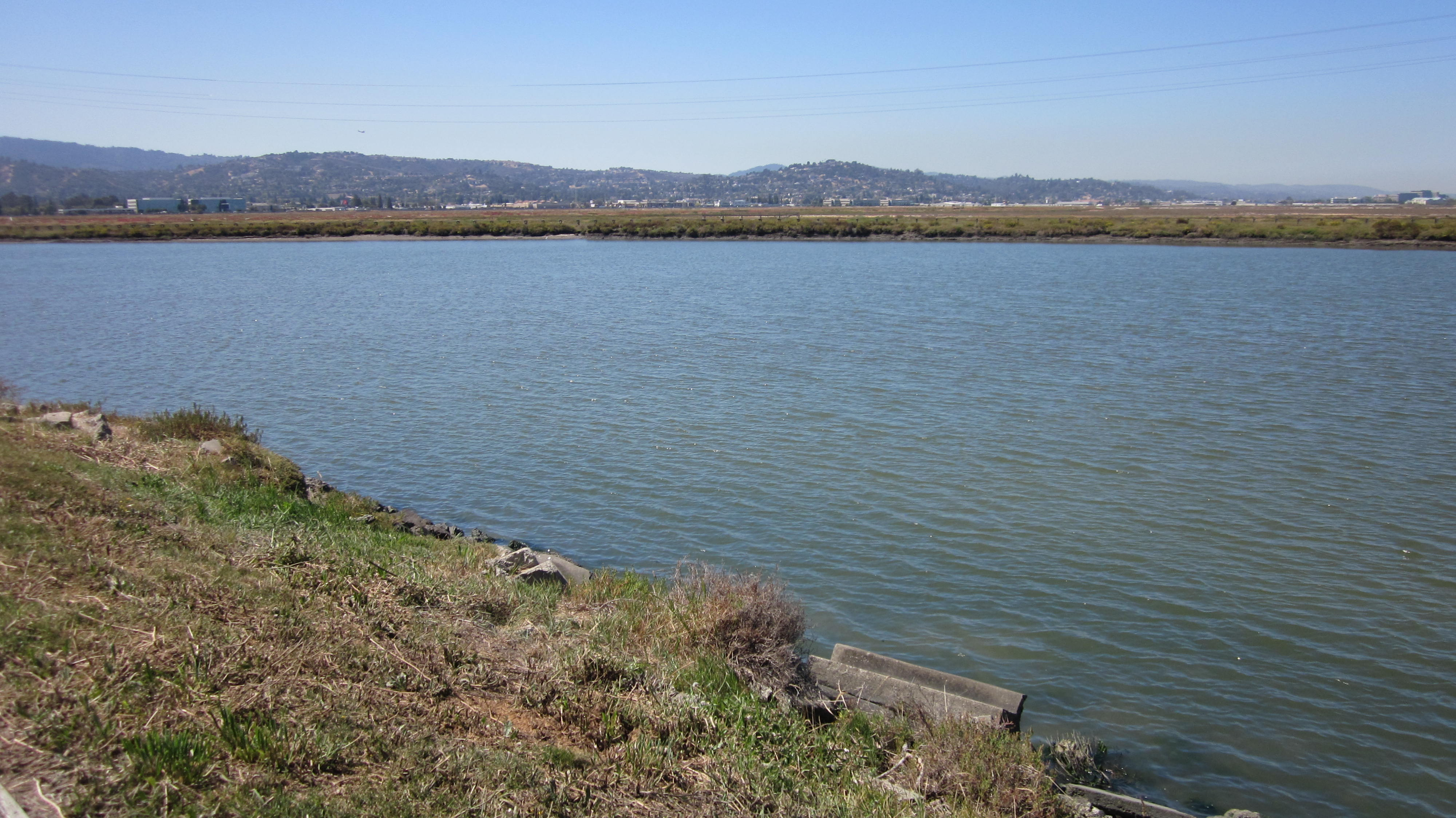
Northwest view across the marsh

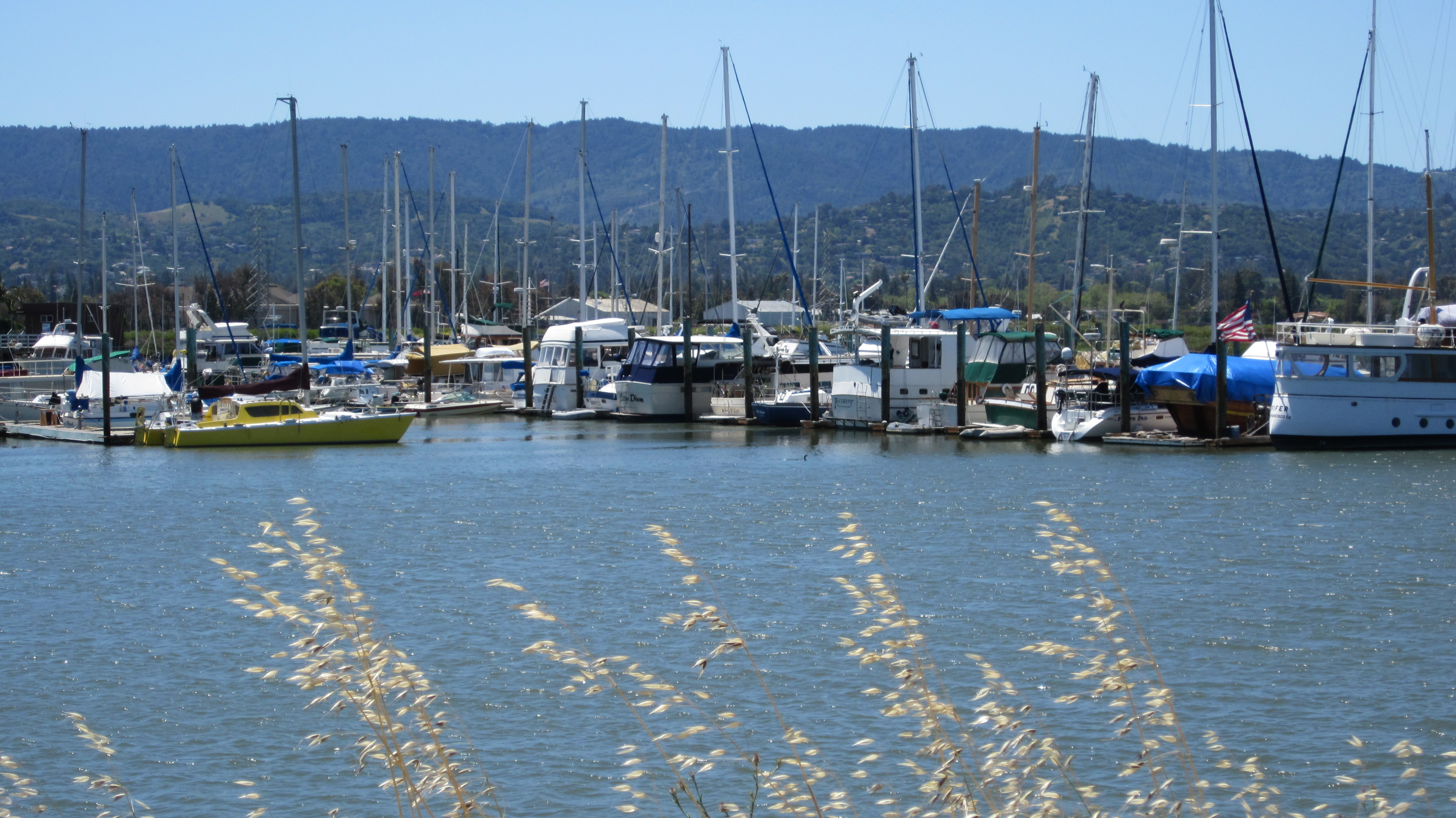
Marina along the creek

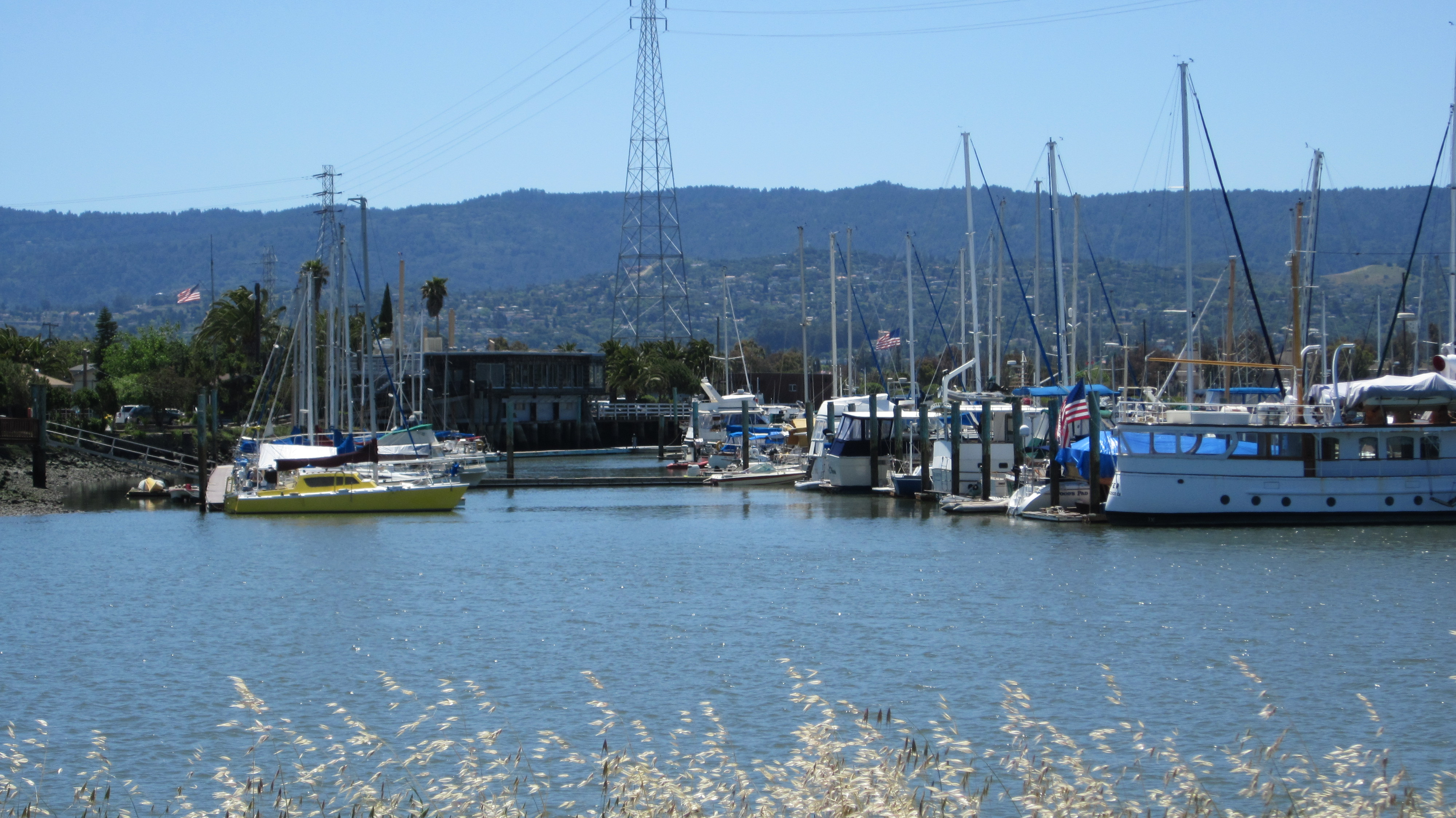
Boats docked

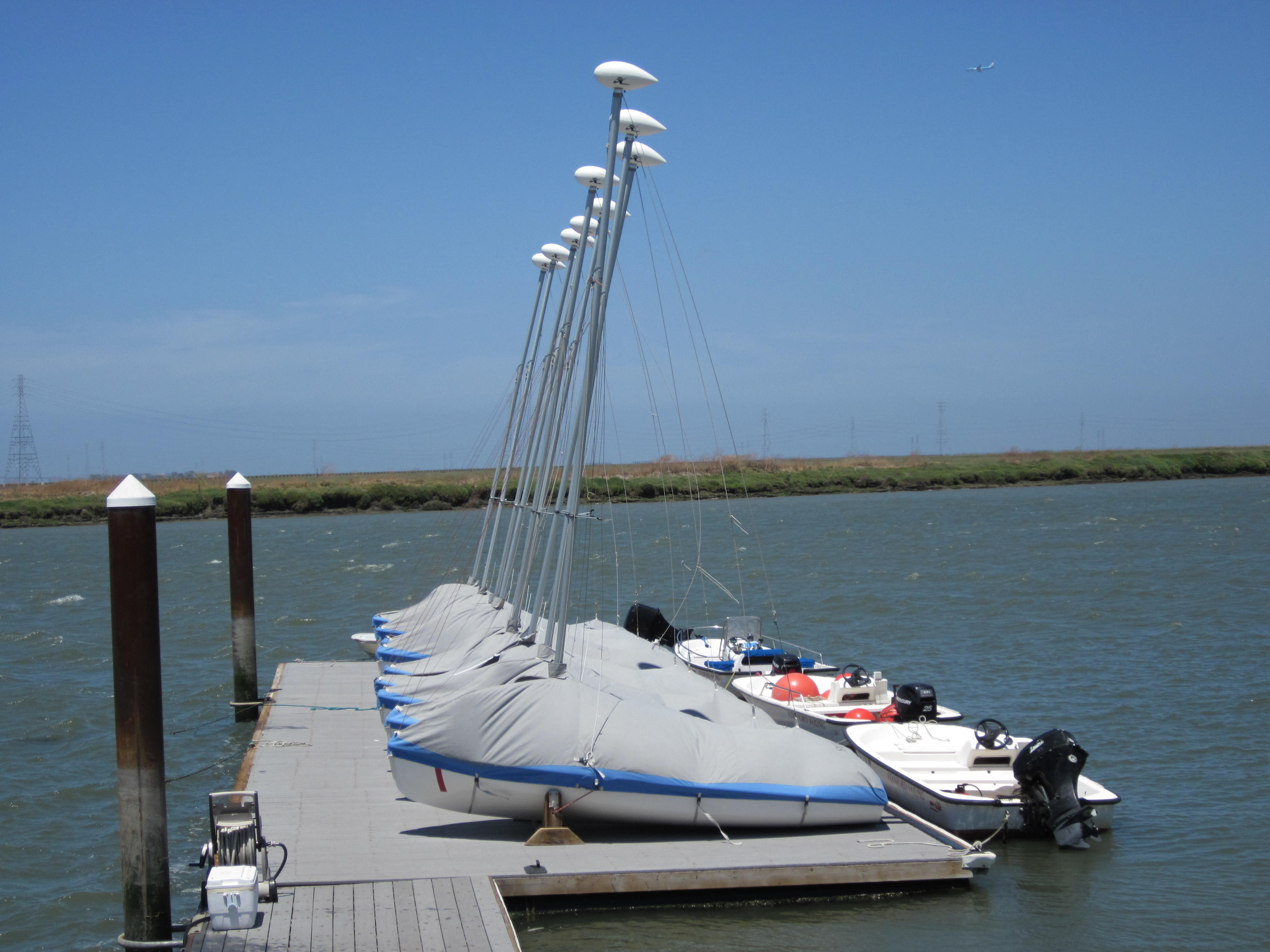
Stanford Cardinal Rowing and Sailing docks

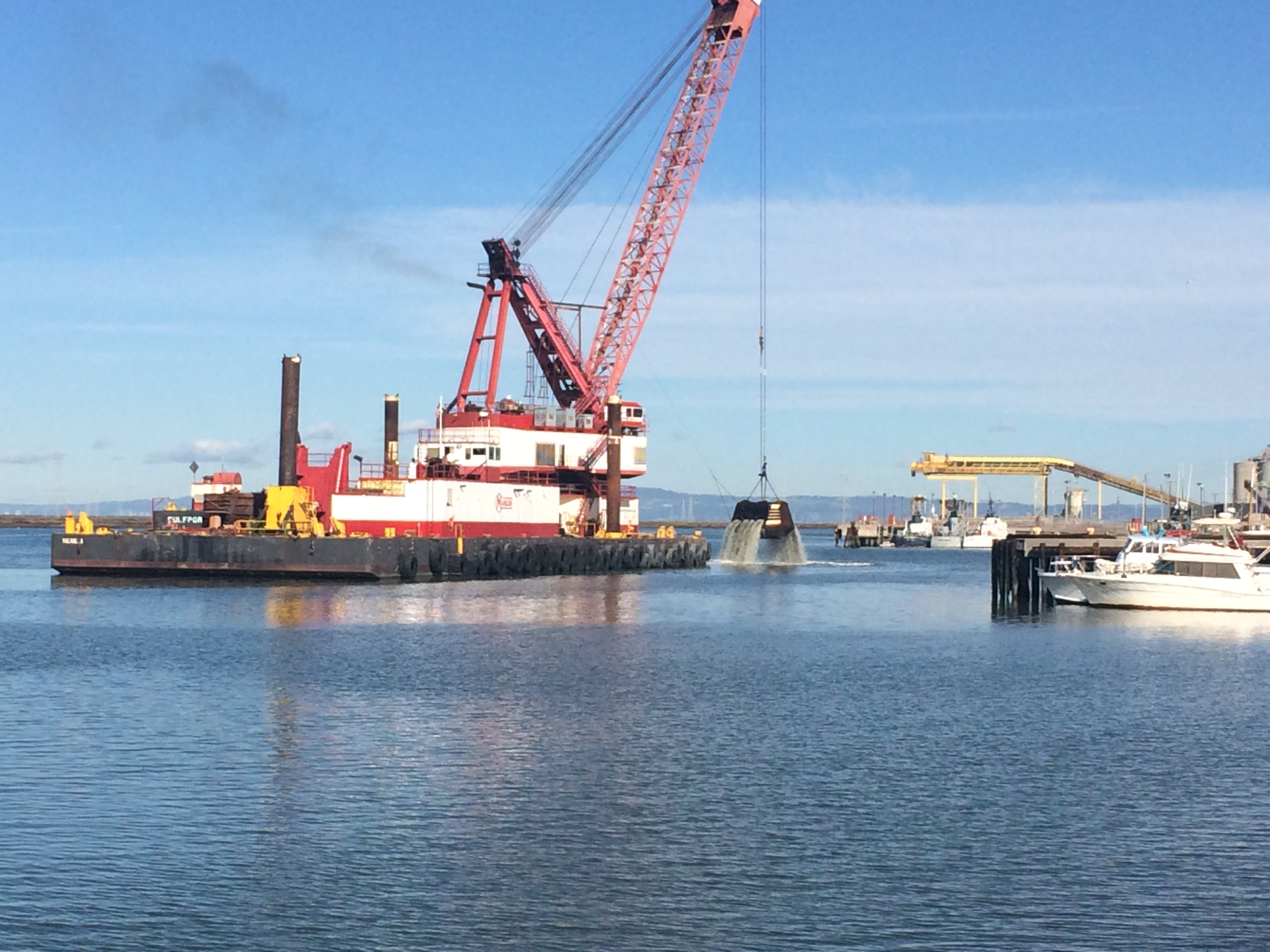
Valhalla dredging for the port

== See also ==
- List of watercourses in the San Francisco Bay Area
- Dredging
- Seaport Centre
- Wetland
