= Bair Island =

Swamp in Redwood City, San Mateo County, United States

Bair Island State Marine Park
- IUCN category V (protected landscape/seascape)
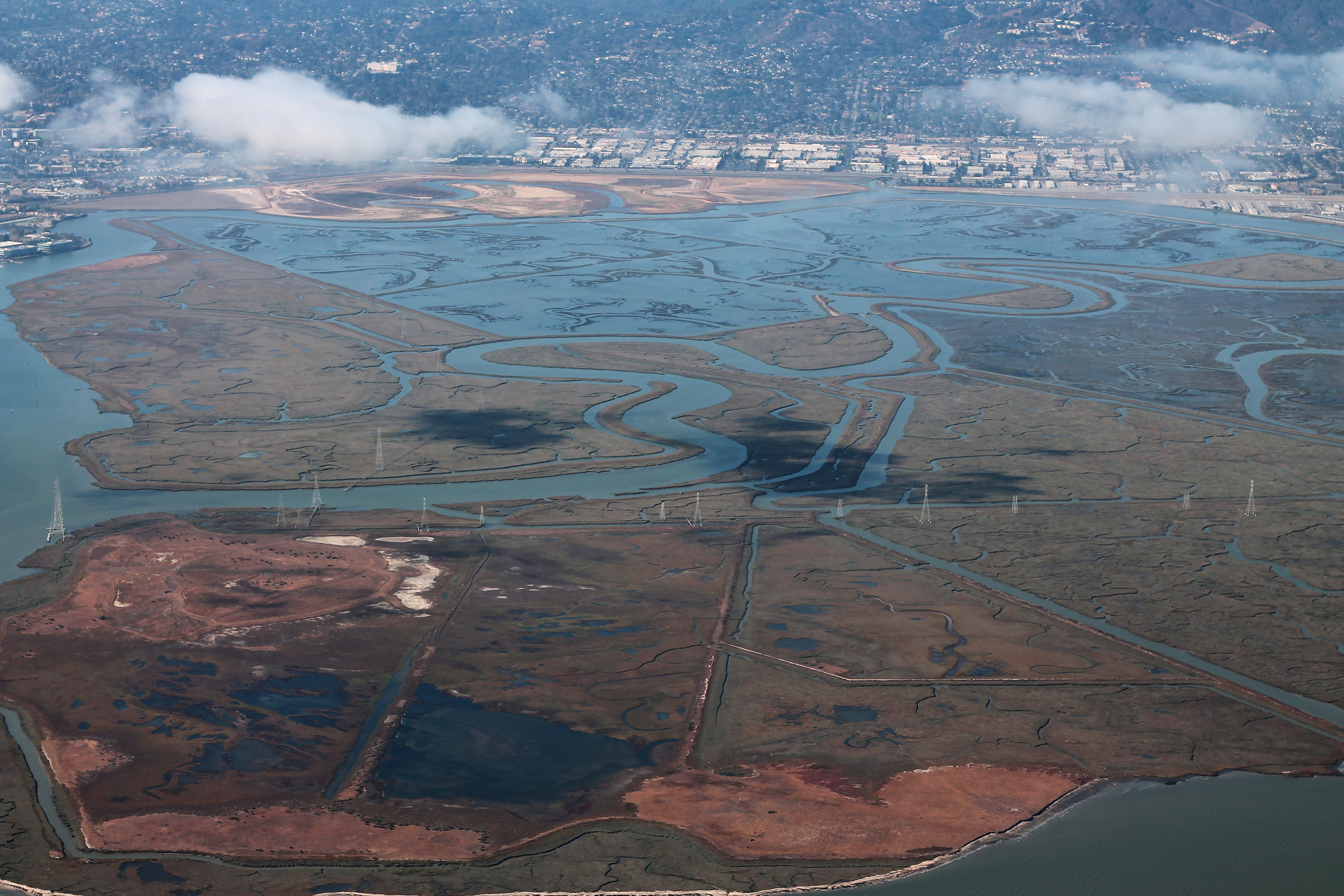
- Bair Island in 2014

- Location within San Francisco Bay Area Location within California Location within the United States
- Location: San Francisco Bay
- Nearest city: Redwood City, California
- Coordinates: 37°31′48″N 122°13′20″W
- Area: 3,398 acres (13.75 km^{2})
- Established: 1986
- Governing body: US Fish and Wildlife Service, Don Edwards San Francisco Bay National Wildlife Refuge

Bair Island is a marsh area in Redwood City, California, covering 3,000 acres (1,200 ha), and includes three islands: the Inner, Middle, and Outer islands. Bair Island is part of the larger Don Edwards San Francisco Bay National Wildlife Refuge. It is surrounded by the Steinberger slough to the northwest and Redwood Creek to the southeast.

The California Department of Fish and Wildlife's Bair Island Ecological Reserve consists of 1,985 acres (803 ha) on the Middle and Outer islands, although the entire island group is managed by the Refuge. Bair Island is an important ecological wetland, which provides critical habitat for a variety of species, including the endangered California clapper rail and the Salt marsh harvest mouse, and is an important stop for birds on the Pacific Flyway. Bair Island is bisected by Corkscrew Slough, a major haul-out site for harbor seals (Phoca vitulina).

== History ==
Bair Island is the largest undeveloped island in the San Francisco Bay and was used for farming, grazing and salt production since the 19th century. A residential development called South Shores had been proposed to build a housing estate with 4000 houses on the marshland. It was approved by the Redwood City council, but a citizens referendum narrowly defeated the project in 1982 by just 44 votes. The Peninsula Open Space Trust purchased the property in 1996 and deeded the site to be part of the Don Edwards National Wildlife Refuge, and the Bair Island Ecological Reserve was established in 1997. In 2013, a pedestrian bridge was opened to connect to trails around the island to allow access to the naturally restored wetlands. In 2017, tour guides began leading pedestrians on the trails and showing the effects of wetland restoration. Some species that have flourished since the restoration are the California Ridgway's rail, pickleweed, and pelicans.

== See also ==
- Islands of San Francisco Bay
- Port of Redwood City
- San Francisco Bay
