= Port of Redwood City =

Port in the San Francisco Bay

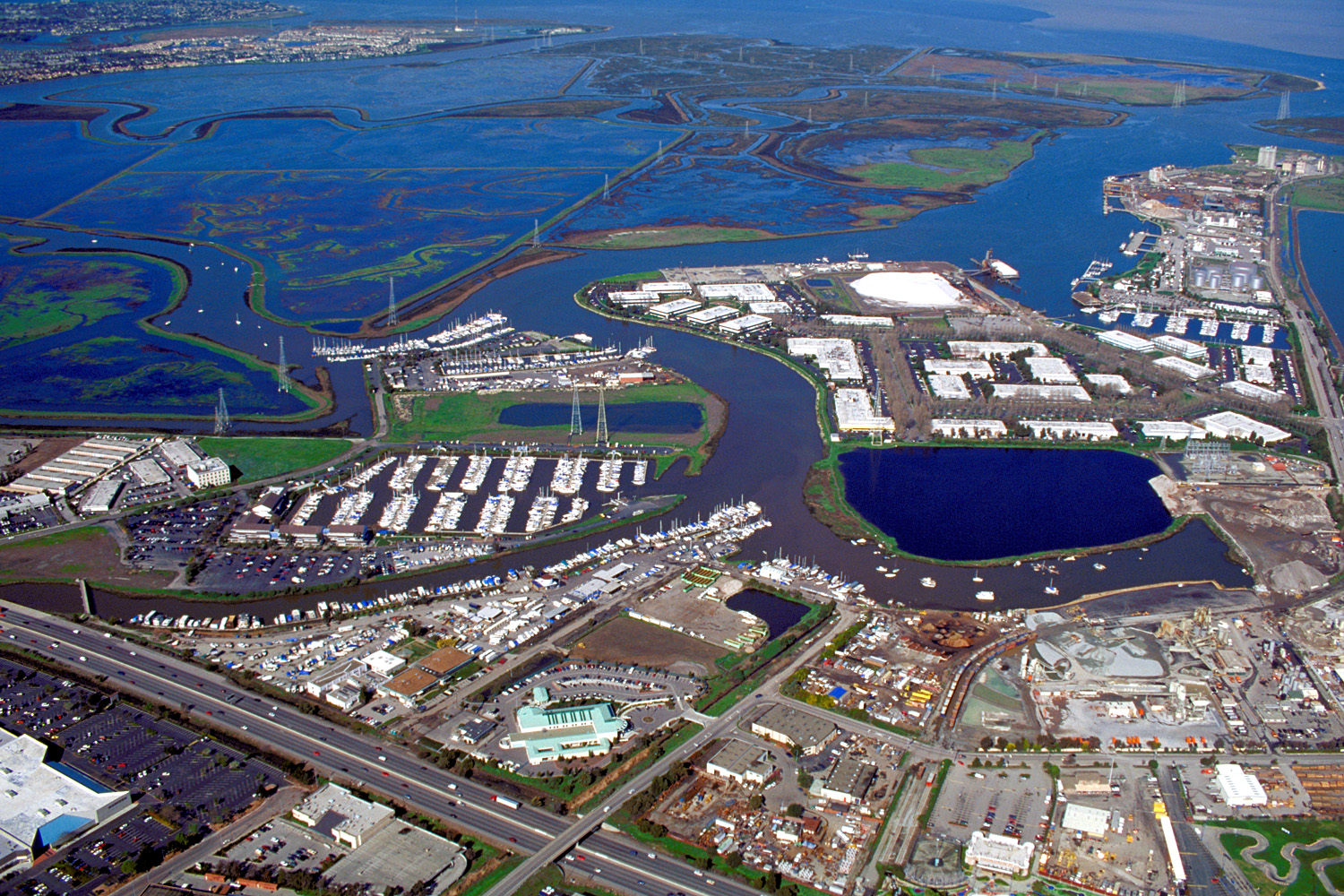
- Aerial view of the Port of Redwood City
- Interactive map of Port of Redwood City

Location
- Country: USA
- Location: Redwood City, California
- Coordinates: 37°30′48″N 122°12′31″W

Details
- Opened: 1850; 176 years ago
- Operated by: Port Commission
- Type of harbour: Natural
- Size of harbour: ~120 acres (49 ha)
- No. of berths: 190
- No. of wharfs: 5
- Chairman: Richard Claire
- Draft depth: 30 feet (9.1 m)

Statistics
- Annual cargo tonnage: 1,552,814 metric tons (1,528,290 long tons; 1,711,684 short tons)
- Annual revenue: US$6,780,000
- Website www.redwoodcityport.com

Port of Redwood City, 1878

The Port of Redwood City is a marine freight terminal on the western side of the southern San Francisco Bay, on the West Coast of the United States. This marine terminal is situated within the city of Redwood City, California. The port was developed from a natural deepwater channel discovered in the year 1850, at the mouth of Redwood Creek. From the early use as a log float port, commercial use expanded to a variety of industrial commodities; moreover, it is considered the birthplace of shipbuilding on the North American west coast. As of 2004 the annual freight shipments have reached about two million metric tons. The Port of Redwood City provides berths for dry bulk, liquid bulk, and project cargoes, along with certain recreational opportunities and public access to San Francisco Bay.

The Port of Redwood City is the only deepwater port in the South San Francisco Bay. Significant expanses of bay mud are present nearby: in Redwood Creek, Westpoint Slough and especially at the mouth of Redwood Creek, where bay muds extend almost two kilometers into San Francisco Bay. In fact, the Port of Redwood City is the only major California port with significant expanses of natural habitat area in its immediate proximity.

== History ==
Robert O. Tripp (founder of the historic Woodside Store) and Mathias A. Parkhurst began the first lumber operation using the waterways of Redwood Creek to float coast redwoods from Woodside to San Francisco in 1850. These two men thus became the founders of Redwood City itself. The Port of Redwood City is considered the place of genesis for the shipbuilding industry on the Pacific West Coast. The first schooner was built here in 1851 by G.M. Burnham and appropriately named Redwood. Shipbuilding thrived here until the 1880s. The last wooden ship built in Redwood City, called the Perseverance, was launched in 1883. The shipbuilding industry experienced a revival in the 1918s with the building of the first concrete ship in America, the SS Faith.

The Port was called El Embarcadero up until at least the 1880s; the U.S. Army Corps of Engineers dredged of a 7-foot-deep (2.1 m) channel between 1886 and 1889, to yield a channel 50 feet (15 m) wide. In 1903, the Corps increased the channel width to 100 feet (30 m) and by 1911, they broadened it to 150 feet (46 m). In 1931, local and federal interests combined to deepen the channel to 20 feet (6.1 m) and widen it to 200 feet (61 m), for a lineal distance of 13,360 feet (4,070 m).

Local businessmen and civic leaders formed the Redwood City Harbor Company in the year 1912, establishing the name of the Port for the era of the early 20th century. In this period competition from the railroad limited growth of the port. A number of industrial companies, however, saw the value of the Port's location, including the Alaska Codfish Company and the Morgan Oyster Company. In particular the Pacific-Portland Cement Company, moving to the Port in 1924, substantially increased shipping activity. Industrial tenants of the port include Cemex, a cement plant, and Sims Metal Management, a metal recycler. The port area has also grown with non-industrial businesses: Spinnaker Sailing, Agiloft, Workboard and others within the Portside Business Park.

In 1966 a napalm manufacturing plant was opened by United Aircraft despite attempts by students and locals to block the opening.

== Geology and hydrology ==
The Port of Redwood City is situated on the east banks of Redwood Creek approximately one kilometer upchannel from the mouth of Redwood Creek. Extensive areas of marshland and bay muds are found in the vicinity of the Port. Westpoint Slough joins Redwood Creek from the southeast about 600 meters north of the Port of Redwood City. Deepwater Slough is a U-shaped channel whose two ends join Redwood Creek both north and south of the Port, with both joins on the opposite site of Redwood Creek. Approximately one kilometer north of the Port of Redwood City, Corkscrew Slough enters Redwood Creek from the northwest. From that confluence northward the northwest bank of Redwood Creek (now at the mouth) consists of Bair Island, an expansive area of saltwater marsh and salt evaporation ponds.

Typical high tides at the Port range from 7.0 to 8.4 feet (2.6 m), based upon February, 2007 tide chart data. Low tide typically varies from −0.8 to 2.9 feet (0.88 m).

Water temperatures measured along the slough of Redwood Creek at NOAA Station RTYC1 typically run to the low 70s F by mid and late summer, which can be as much as 10 degrees warmer than water temperatures in the northern and central sections of San Francisco Bay.

== Microclimate ==
Climates within the San Francisco Bay Area have superficial similarities, but certain features have pronounced differences. For this reason a detailed microclimate study was conducted at the Port of Redwood City, with the specific goal of comparing meteorological parameters to nearby locations. Temperatures, for example, were found to conform closely to those of San Francisco International Airport and Palo Alto Airport; in contrast, wind speeds at the Port were found to be approximately half the levels of San Francisco Airport. This result is not surprising since Conomos observed that the wind speeds in Northern San Mateo County are high due to the San Bruno Gap in the Santa Cruz Mountains.

== Recreational use ==
The Port of Redwood City has more than one lineal mile of public access along Redwood Creek, including walkways, viewing areas and picnic areas. The Port provides a venue for a number of public events and festivals, including visits by historic ships and sailing vessels. Some of the specific activities include a decorated boat parade, crew races, Hawaiian outrigger canoe races, fireworks and sailing regattas.

The 190-berth Redwood City Marina is operated within the Port of Redwood City. This facility accommodates vessels up to 50 feet (15 m) in length and has 10 feet (3.0 m) of draft at low tide. The Port provides electricity and water service to the permanent and overnight boats; restrooms, showers, and laundry facilities are also available for marina users.

The port operates a 24/7 public boat ramp. In addition several private yacht clubs use the port including the Sequoia Yacht Club (founded 1939) and the Peninsula Yacht Club. Several Sea Scout ships and one Mariner Scout (Girl Scout) ship also use the facility. Stanford University has its Stanford Rowing & Sailing Center at the port.

== Role in emergency water transit ==
Governor Arnold Schwarzenegger, in his 2007 state of the State of California address, unveiled a plan for emergency water transit for the San Francisco Bay Region. The plan provides for a key role for the Port of Redwood City which "is strategically located between two bridges — the Dumbarton Bridge and the San Mateo Bridge. A Redwood City ferry terminal would be a crucial link, and also serve about 1400 regular passengers a day". The plan, inspired by New York City's harbor service following 9/11, would feature 88 new vessels and multiple portable piers that could be deployed to respond to an emergency. The Port of Redwood City, whose director has endorsed the plan, would play a key role as a permanent marine terminal installation for the proposed system. The entity to conduct this $1.6 billion project is named the San Francisco Bay Area Water Emergency Transportation Authority. Ferry service is still under plans for the port while independent operators are scheduled to start services in 2017.

== Gallery ==
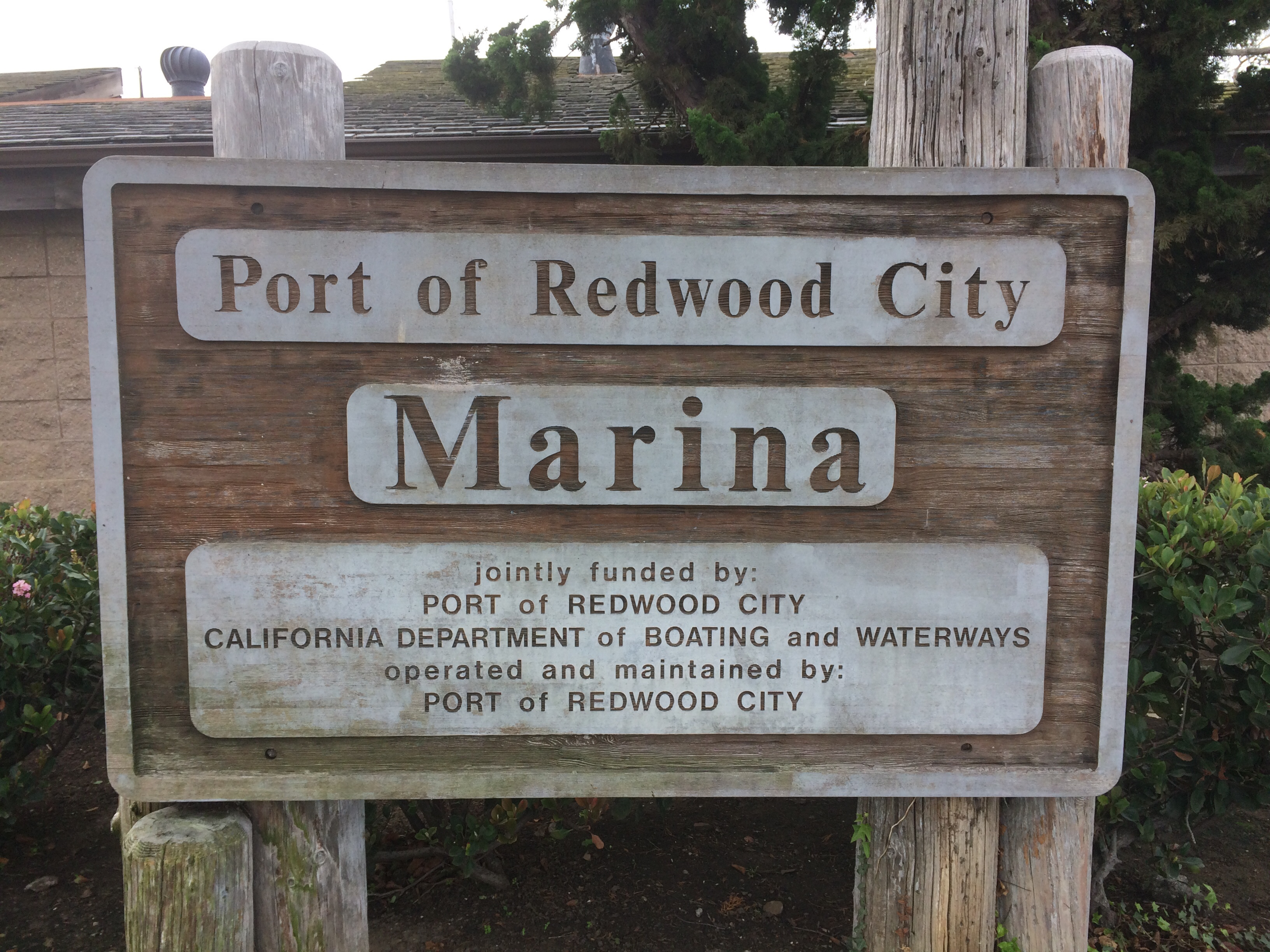
Port sign

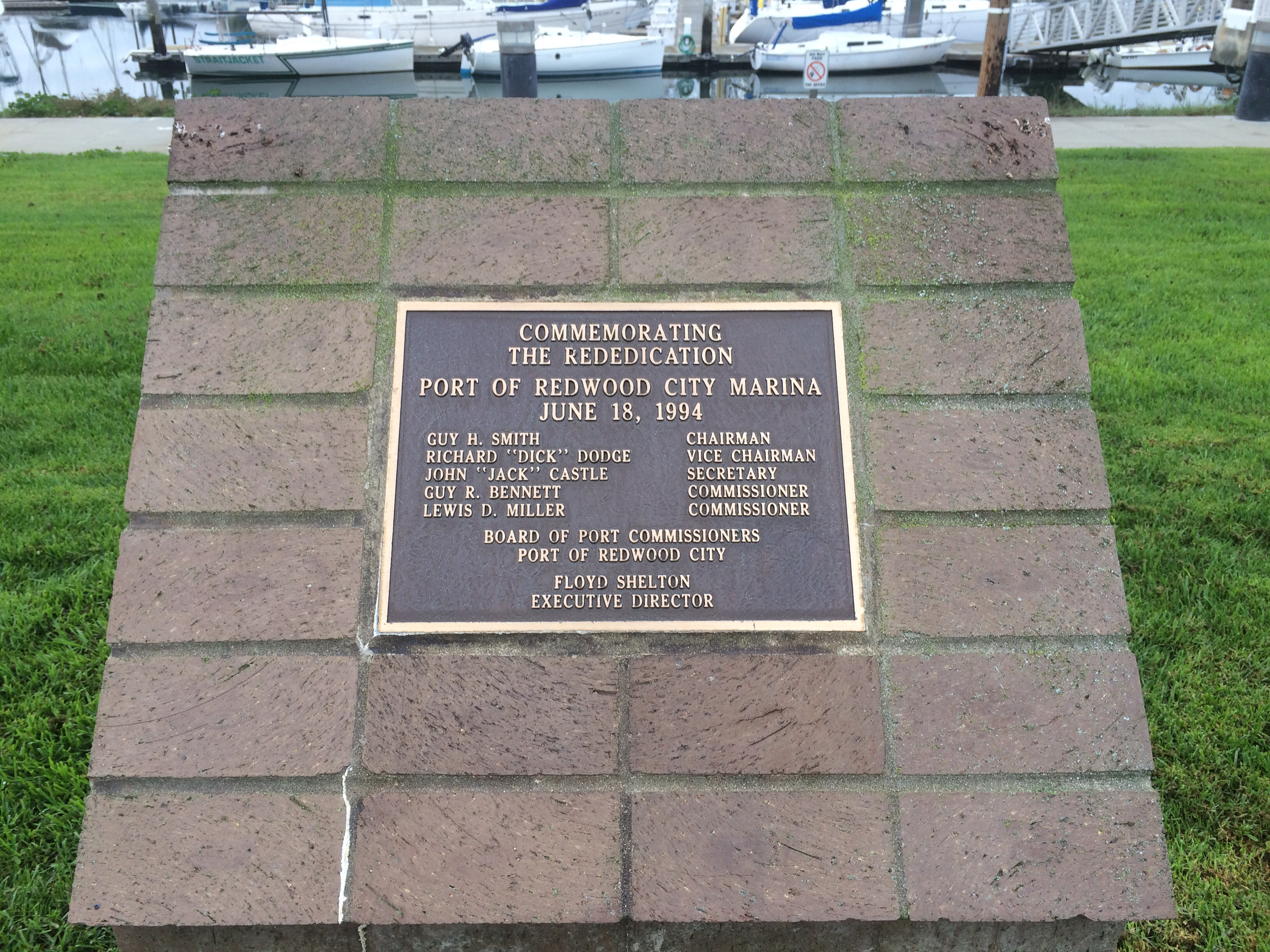
Plaque commemorating rededication

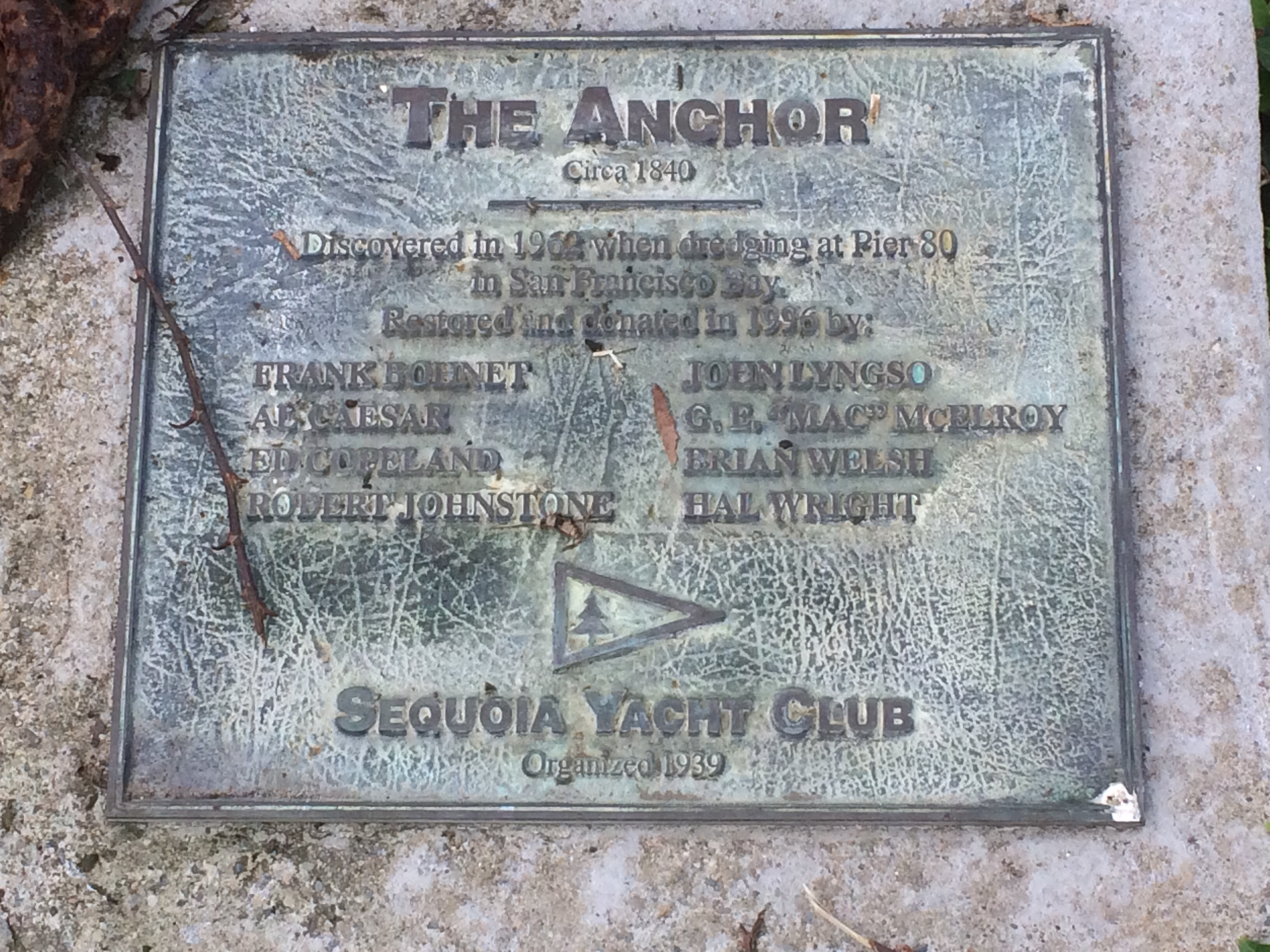
Plaque for The Anchor discovered 1962

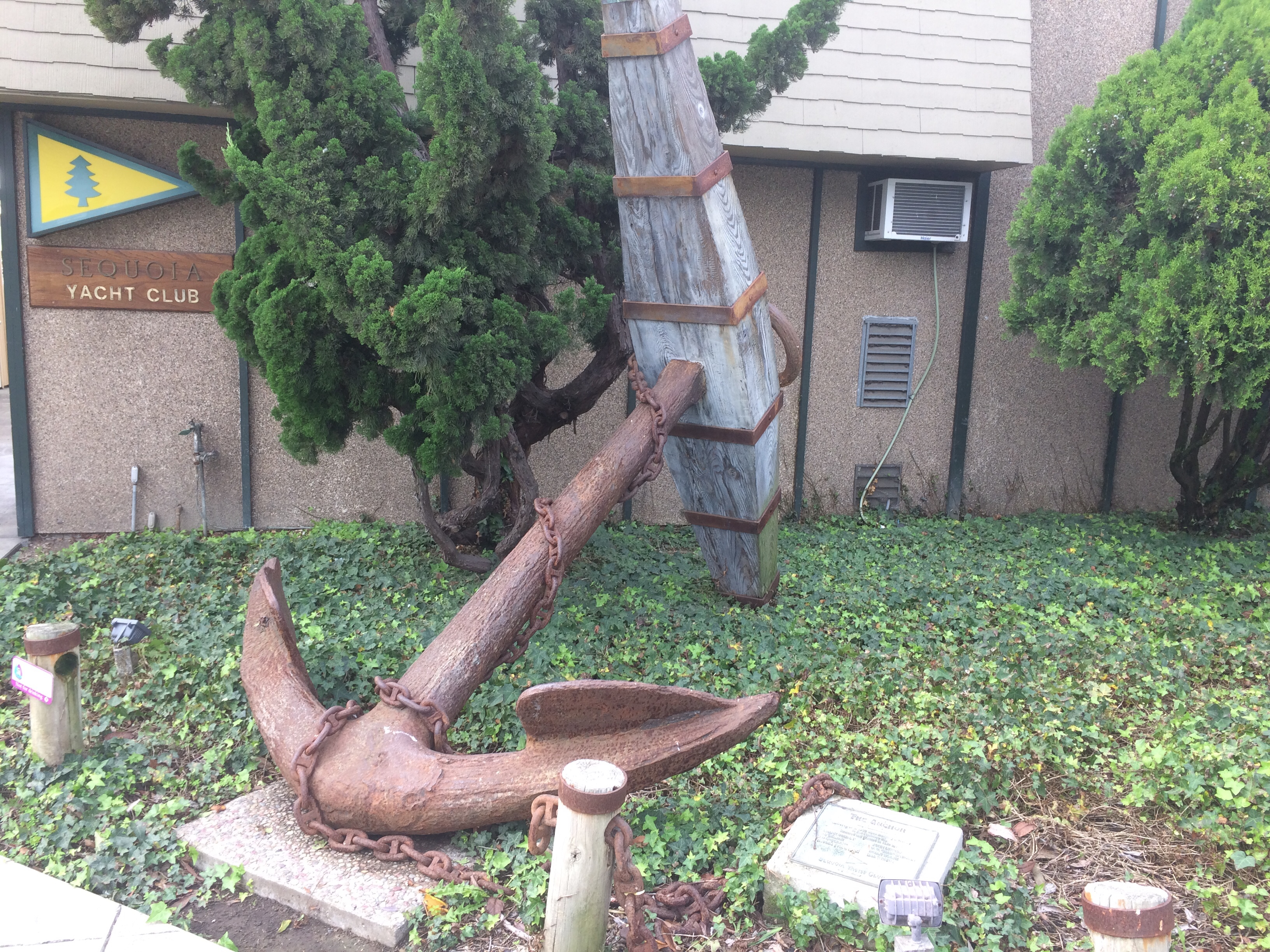
The Anchor circa 1840

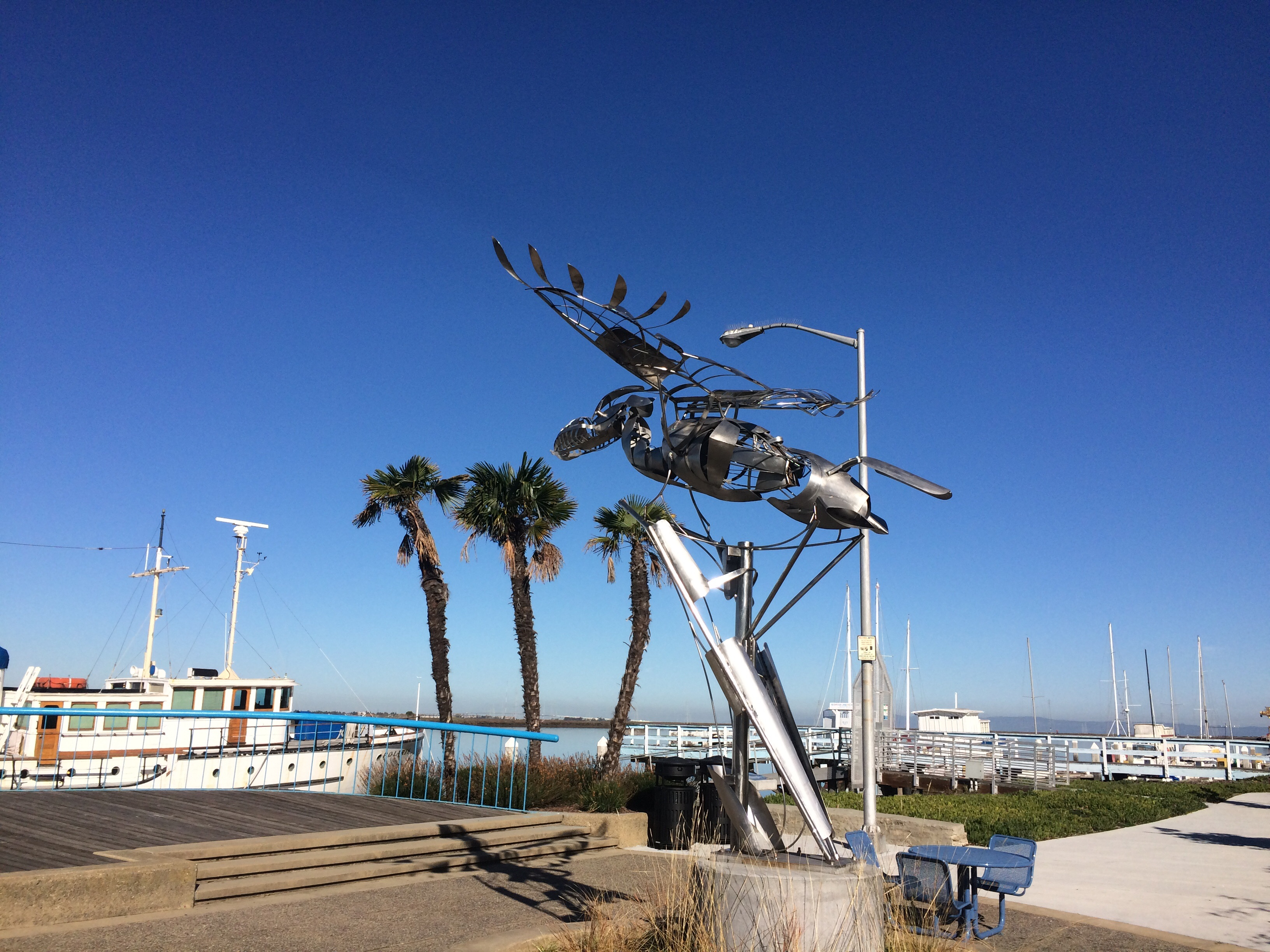
The Heron sculpture by David Han

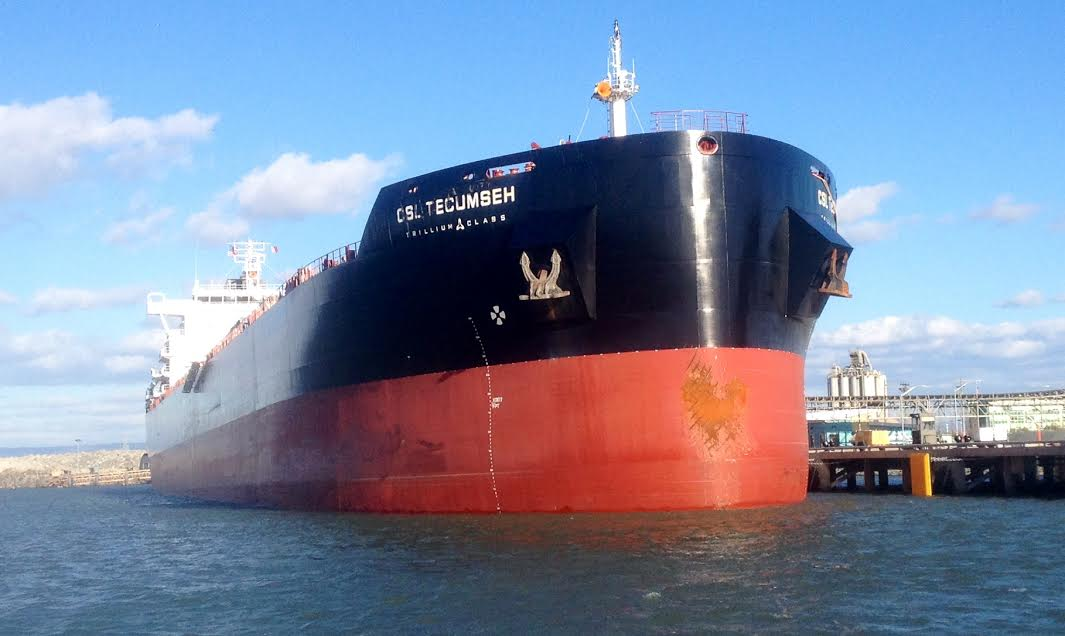
CSL Tecumseh docked

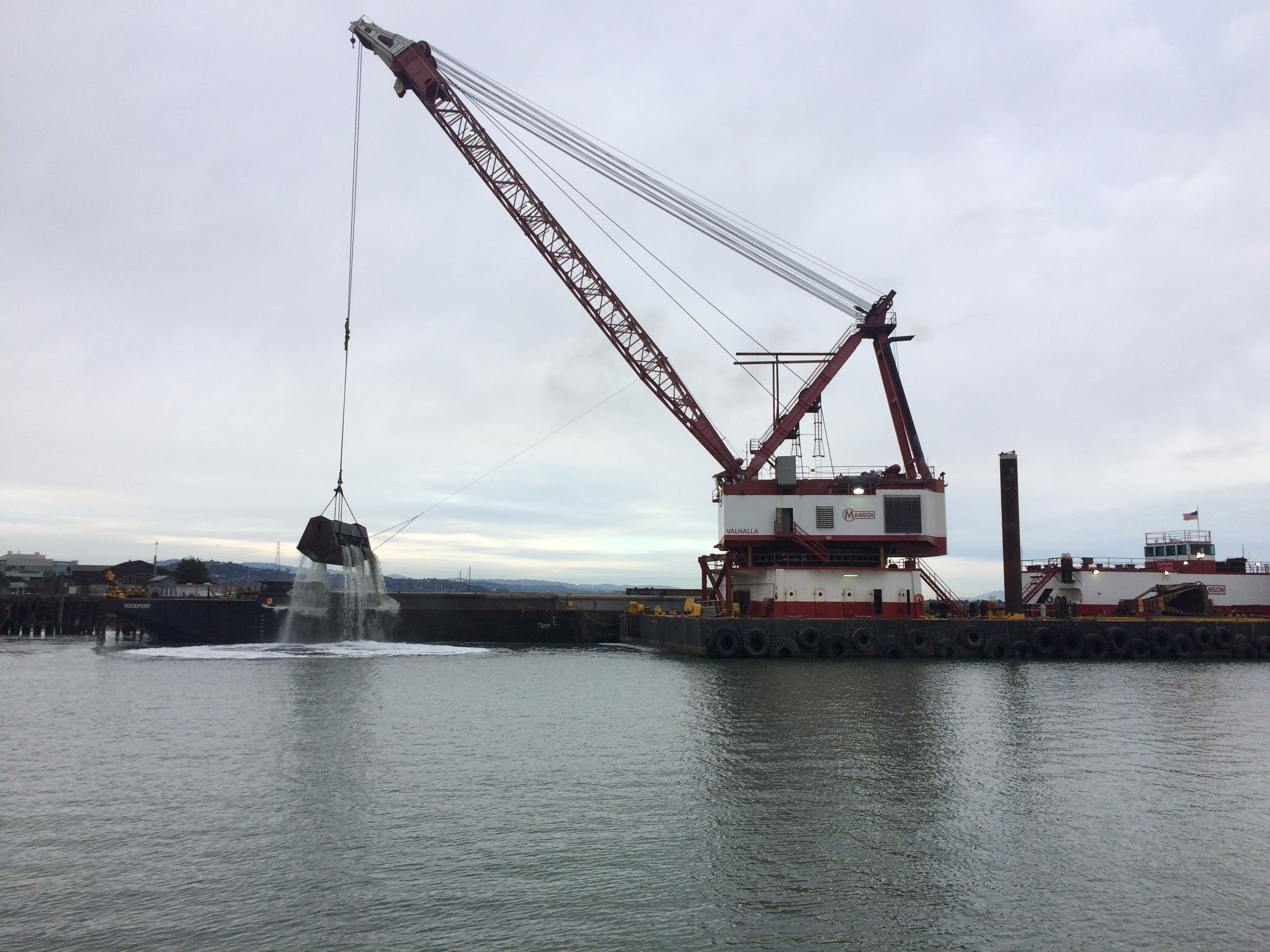
Valhallah dredging the port.

== See also ==
- Port of Oakland
- Port of San Francisco
- Seaport Centre
