= Stanford Cardinal =

Intercollegiate sports teams of Stanford University, California, United States

- University: Stanford University
- Nickname: Cardinal
- NCAA: Division I (FBS)
- Conference: Atlantic Coast Conference (primary); Mountain Pacific Sports Federation (beach volleyball, men's gymnastics, men's rowing, men's volleyball, water polo); PCCSC (sailing); CSA (women's squash)
- Athletic director: John Donahoe
- Location: Stanford, California
- Varsity teams: 36 (15 men's, 19 women's, 2 co-ed)
- Football stadium: Stanford Stadium
- Basketball arena: Maples Pavilion
- Baseball stadium: Klein Field at Sunken Diamond
- Softball stadium: Boyd & Jill Smith Family Stadium
- Soccer stadium: Maloney Field at Laird Q. Cagan Stadium
- Aquatics center: Avery Aquatic Center
- Rowing venue: Arrillaga Family Rowing and Sailing Center
- Sailing venue: Arrillaga Family Rowing and Sailing Center
- Tennis venue: Taube Tennis Center
- Other venues: Arrillaga Center for Sports and Recreation; Burnham Pavilion; Cobb Track and Angell Field; Red Barn; Stanford Beach Volleyball Stadium; Stanford Golf Course; Varsity Field Hockey Turf
- Colors: Cardinal and white
- Mascot: Stanford Tree (unofficial)
- Fight song: "Come Join The Band" (official); "All Right Now" (de facto)
- Website: www.gostanford.com
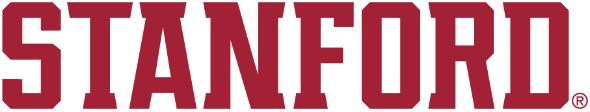

Atlantic Coast Conference logo in Stanford's colors

The Stanford Cardinal are the athletic teams that represent Stanford University. Stanford's teams compete at the National Collegiate Athletic Association (NCAA) Division I (Football Bowl Subdivision (FBS) for college football) level, primarily in the Atlantic Coast Conference (ACC).

Stanford's program has won 139 NCAA team championships, the most of any university. Stanford has won at least one NCAA team championship in 50 consecutive academic years, starting in 1976–77 and continuing through 2025–26. Through July 2026, Stanford athletes have won 576 individual NCAA titles.

Stanford has won 26 of the 32 NACDA Directors' Cups, awarded annually to the most successful overall college sports program in the nation, including 25 consecutive Cups from 1994–95 through 2018–19. 177 Stanford-affiliated athletes have won a total of 335 Summer Olympic medals (162 gold, 93 silver, 80 bronze), including 39 medals at the 2024 Paris games.

== Nickname and mascot history ==
A brighter Cardinal red was chosen as Stanford's official color by an assembly of the university's first students in 1891. White was adopted as a secondary color in the 1940s.

Following Stanford's win over California in the first-ever Big Game on March 19, 1892, the team was metonymically referred to as the "Cardinal" by sportswriters in the next day's San Francisco Chronicle. The university's athletic teams continued to be referred to as the "Cardinal" or "Cardinals" even after the adoption of the "Indians" name.

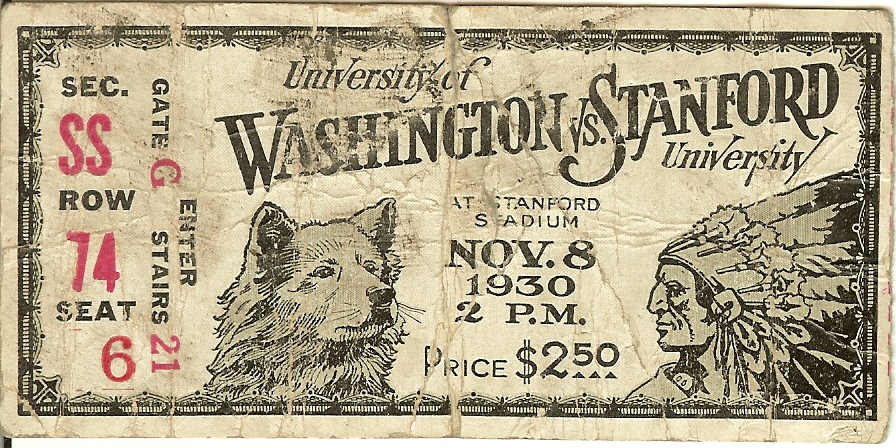
1930 football ticket stub depicting the Stanford Indian mascot

On November 25, 1930, following a unanimous vote by the Executive Committee for the Associated Students, the athletic department adopted the mascot "Indian".

On March 3, 1972, a few months after the football team's second straight win in the Rose Bowl, the Indian symbol and name were dropped by Stanford president Richard Lyman after objections from Native American students and a vote by the student senate.

From 1972 to 1981, the official nickname returned to "Cardinals", a reference to the color, not the bird. During the 1970s, a number of suggestions were put forth as possible nicknames: Robber Barons (a sly reference to Leland Stanford's history), Sequoias, Trees, Railroaders, Spikes, Huns and Griffins. The last suggestion gained enough momentum to prompt the athletics department to move two griffin statues from the site of the former Stanford Home for Convalescent Children to near the athletic facilities.

On November 17, 1981, school president Donald Kennedy declared that the athletic teams be represented by the color cardinal in its singular form.

Stanford has no official mascot, but the Stanford Tree, a member of the Stanford Band wearing a self-designed tree costume, appears at major Stanford sports events. The Tree is based on El Palo Alto, a redwood tree in neighboring Palo Alto that appears in the Stanford seal and athletics logo.

== Sports sponsored ==
Stanford University sponsors 36 varsity sports teams — 15 men's, 19 women's, and two coed sports — competing primarily in the NCAA Division I and the Atlantic Coast Conference (ACC), with the primary affiliation recently changed from the Pac-12 Conference.

Among sports not sponsored by the ACC, men's rowing and women's lightweight rowing compete in the Intercollegiate Rowing Association; men's gymnastics, men's volleyball, beach volleyball, and men's and women's water polo all compete in the Mountain Pacific Sports Federation (MPSF); sailing in the Intercollegiate Sailing Association; squash in the College Squash Association; and artistic swimming under the sport's US governing body of USA Synchro.

In July 2020, due to increased financial constraints caused by the COVID-19 pandemic, Stanford Athletics announced they will be eliminating 11 varsity teams after the conclusion of the 2020–21 academic year: men's and women's fencing, field hockey, lightweight rowing, men's rowing, co-ed and women's sailing, squash, artistic swimming, men's volleyball and wrestling. These planned cuts were canceled in May 2021.

Men's sports	Women's sports
Baseball	Basketball
Basketball	Beach volleyball
Cross country	Cross country
Football	Field hockey
Golf	Golf
Gymnastics	Gymnastics
Rowing	Lacrosse
Soccer	Rowing
Swimming and diving	Rowing lightweight
Tennis	Soccer
Track and field^{†}	Softball
Volleyball	Squash
Water polo	Swimming and diving
Wrestling	Artistic swimming
	Tennis
	Track and field^{†}
	Volleyball
	Water polo
Co-ed sports
Fencing
Sailing
† – Track and field includes both indoor and outdoor

=== Baseball ===
The Cardinal have appeared in the NCAA Division I baseball tournament 35 times, and have appeared in the College World Series 19 times. They have won two National Championships, in 1987 and 1988.

=== Men's golf ===
The men's golf team has won eight NCAA Championships: 1939, 1941, 1942 (co-champions), 1946, 1953, 1994, 2007, 2019. They have crowned three individual national champions: Sandy Tatum (1942), Tiger Woods (1996), and Cameron Wilson (2014). They have won 12 Pac-12 Conference championships: 1960, 1968, 1970, 1974, 1977 (south), 1992, 1994, 2014, 2015, 2016, 2019, and 2023 and one Atlantic Coast Conference championship: 2026. Other notable players include Tom Watson, Bob Rosburg, NFL quarterback John Brodie, and Notah Begay III.

=== Women's golf ===
Stanford golfers have won individual golf championships four times. In 1971, Shelley Hamlin won the women's national intercollegiate individual golf championship (an event conducted by the Division of Girls' and Women's Sports, which evolved into the current NCAA women's golf championship). More recently, Stanford golfers won individual NCAA titles three years in a row: Rachel Heck in 2021, Rose Zhang in 2022, and Rose Zhang again in 2023. Zhang is the only woman who has ever won two NCAA individual titles.

Stanford has won the NCAA team championship four times: in 2015, 2022, 2024, and 2026. From 2015 to the present, the championship has been determined by match play. Stanford is the only team to reach the match play portion of the championship every year it has been offered.

=== Sailing ===
Stanford Sailing has won the following Intercollegiate Sailing Association championship events:

- the ICSA Open Fleet Race Championship in 2023 and 2025
- the ICSA Open Team Race Championship in 1997
- the ICSA Women's Fleet Race Championship from 2023 through 2026
- the ICSA Women's Team Race Championship from 2024 through 2026
- the ICSA Men's Singlehanded Championship in 1963, 2006, and 2022
- the ICSA Women's Singlehanded Championship in 2000 and 2018

In 2023 and 2025, Stanford Sailing won the Leonard M. Fowle Trophy, which the ICSA awards annually to the best overall college team.

In March 2019, John Vandemoer, Stanford University's head sailing coach for 11 years, pleaded guilty to one count of conspiracy to commit racketeering for accepting bribes in the 2019 college admissions bribery scandal, to hold open admission spots at the university for three applicants falsely portrayed as competitive sailors, in exchange for $770,000 in payments to the sailing program. Unlike others indicted in the scheme, he did not personally benefit financially. The university fired Vandemoer. Clinton Hayes was appointed interim head coach.

=== Men's soccer ===
The Cardinal have appeared in the NCAA Division I Men's Soccer Tournament 20 times, including in 8 consecutive years from 2013 through 2020. They have seven appearances in the College Cup, winning the national championship in 2015, 2016, and 2017.

=== Women's soccer ===
The Cardinal won the NCAA women's soccer championship in 2011, 2017, and 2019.

=== Softball ===
The Cardinal softball team has appeared in four Women's College World Series, in 2001, 2004, 2023, and 2024. The Cardinal program was the co-champions of the PAC-10 conference in 2005, which is their only conference championship. The current head softball coach of the Stanford program is Jessica Allister.

=== Men's tennis ===
The Cardinal have won 17 NCAA Men's tennis championships: 1973, 1974, 1977, 1978, 1980, 1981, 1983, 1986, 1988, 1989, 1990, 1992, 1995, 1996, 1997, 1998, and 2000.

=== Women's tennis ===
The Cardinal have won 20 of the 43 NCAA women's tennis team championships that have taken place, winning in 1982, 1984, 1986, 1987 through 1991, 1997, 1999, 2001, 2002, 2004 through 2006, 2010, 2013, 2016, 2018, and 2019. Stanford also won the 1978 women's tennis championship, awarded by the AIAW. 2023 was the first year in which Stanford held fewer than half of the NCAA team championships ever awarded.

Stanford tennis players have won the individual singles championship many times:

Years	Player	Organiser
1964	Jane Albert	AIAW
1979	Kathy Jordan	AIAW
1982	Alycia Moulton	NCAA
1985	Linda Gates	NCAA
1986 and 1987	Patty Fendick	NCAA
1989	Sandra Birch	NCAA
1990	Debbie Graham	NCAA
1991	Sandra Birch	NCAA
1997	Lilia Osterloh	NCAA
2000 and 2001	Laura Granville	NCAA
2003 and 2004	Amber Liu	NCAA
2012 and 2013	Nicole Gibbs	NCAA

Stanford tennis players have also won the doubles championship many times:

Years	Players	Organiser
1962	Linda Yeomans and Carol Hanks	AIAW
1967	Jane Albert and Julie Anthony	AIAW
1976 and 1977	Susie Hagey and Diane Morrison	AIAW
1978	Barbara Jordan and Kathy Jordan	AIAW
1979	Kathy Jordan and Alycia Moulton	AIAW
1981	Caryn Copeland and Alycia Moulton	AIAW
1984	Linda Gates and Elise Burgin	NCAA
1985	Linda Gates and Leigh-Anne Eldredge	NCAA
1990	Meredith McGrath and Teri Whitlinger	NCAA
2002	Lauren Kalvaria and Gabriela Lastra	NCAA
2005	Alice Barnes and Erin Burdette	NCAA
2010	Hilary Barte and Lindsay Burdette	NCAA
2011	Hilary Barte and Mallory Burdette	NCAA
2012	Mallory Burdette and Nicole Gibbs	NCAA

Future astronaut Sally Ride was the team's top player in 1971. The NCAA later honored her with two awards given to former college athletes who distinguished themselves in their professional lives: the Silver Anniversary Award in 1998, and the Theodore Roosevelt Award, described as the highest honor the NCAA may confer on an individual, in 2005.

=== Men's volleyball ===
The Stanford Cardinal men's volleyball team represents Stanford in the Mountain Pacific Sports Federation. They are currently led by head coach John Kosty, who took the job in 2007, and play their home games at Maples Pavilion. The team has won two NCAA National Championships (1997 and 2010), plus earned NCAA Runner-up twice, as well.

==== Notable players ====
- Barry Brown
- Canyon Ceman
- Scott Fortune
- Matt Fuerbringer
- Gabriel Gardner
- Kevin Hansen
- Adam Keefe
- Michael Lambert
- Jon Root
- James Shaw
- Erik Shoji
- Kawika Shoji
- John Taylor
- Andy Witt

=== Women's volleyball ===
The Cardinal have won 9 NCAA Women's volleyball national championships: in 1992, 1994, 1996, 1997, 2001, 2004, 2016, 2018 and 2019. Stanford has appeared in 17 championship games, more than any other team. Stanford has qualified for 42 of the 43 NCAA tournaments, missing the postseason only during the COVID-shortened 2020–21 season. Only Penn State has appeared in all 43 tournaments.

=== Women's water polo ===
The Cardinal have won 10 NCAA national championships in women's water polo, more than any other university: in 2002, 2011, 2012, 2014, 2015, 2017, 2019, 2022, 2023, and 2025. Stanford is the only program that has participated in every NCAA Championship since the event began in 2001. Stanford has advanced to the title match in 13 of the last 15 championships.

=== Wrestling ===
The Stanford wrestling team is coached by Rob Koll, replacing Jason Borelli after he took the head coaching job at American University in 2021. In his 13 years as head coach, Borelli led the Cardinal to 122 dual wins, making him Stanford's winningest coach. The Cardinal wrestlers practice in the Weintz Family Wrestling Room, and compete on campus at Burnham Pavilion, with a capacity of about 1,400.

The Cardinal wrestling team won the Pac-12 championship once, in 2019. They have placed in the top 19 at the NCAA Division I Wrestling Championships eight times: in 1967 (13th), 2004 (19th), 2008 (19th), 2011 (11th), 2012 (16th), 2016 (19th), 2021 (17th), and 2022 (19th). Stanford has three individual wrestling national champions in its history: Matt Gentry at 157 pounds in 2004, Shane Griffith at 165 pounds in 2021, and Aden Valencia at 149 pounds in 2026.

Stanford's wrestling program was one of the eleven the school planned on eliminating after the 2020–21 season. In response, the team wore solid black singlets without the school logo. Wrestling fans also led a movement to keep the program afloat, before the school ultimately reversed its decision.

== Notable non-varsity sports ==
=== Rugby ===
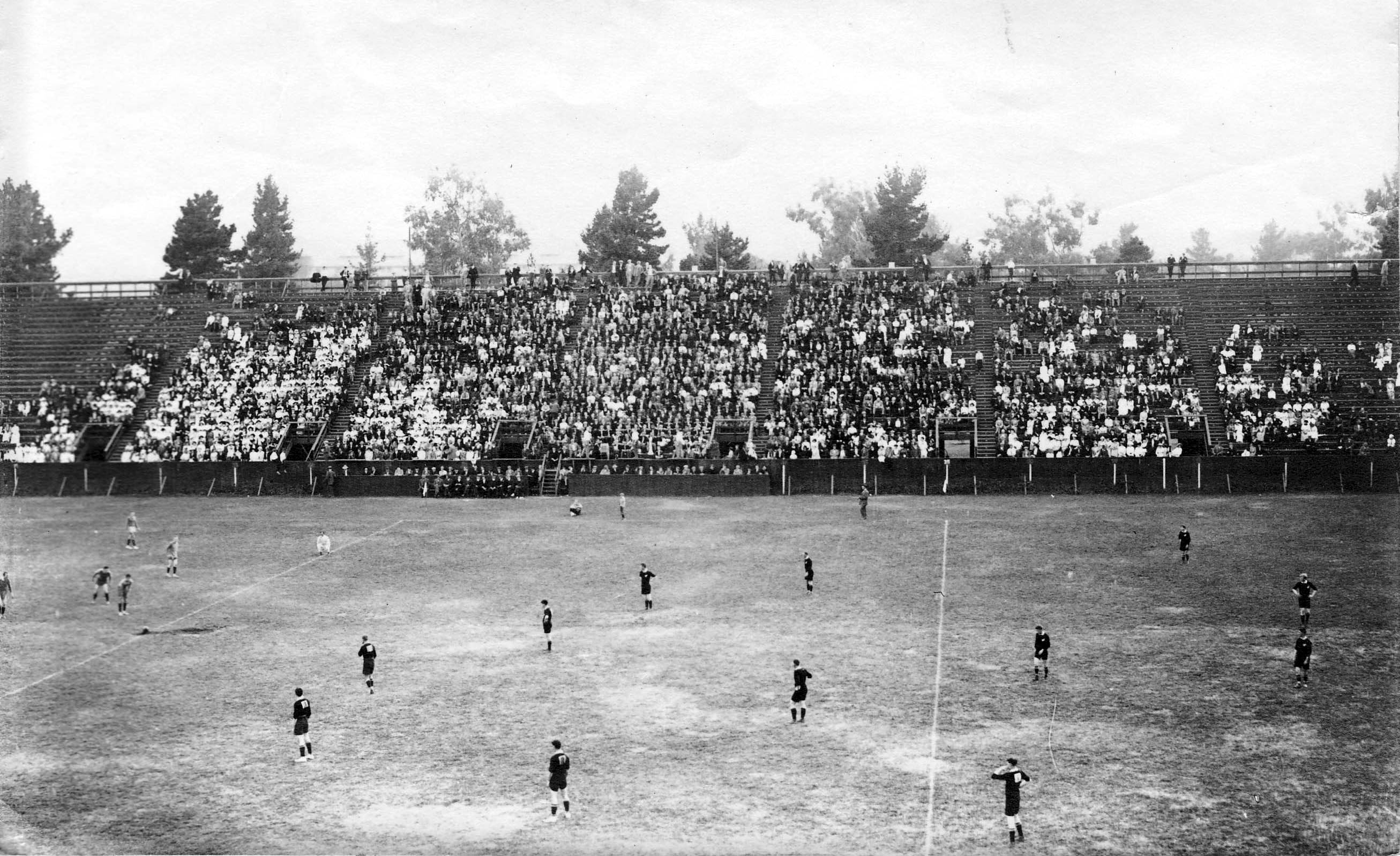
Stanford rugby team playing the All Blacks in 1913

Stanford has fielded a college rugby team since 1906, and replaced football entirely until 1917. Stanford achieved one of the most surprising victories of American rugby's early history by beating a touring Australian club team in 1912. Rugby remained a varsity sport at Stanford until 1977. Despite the loss of varsity status, the Stanford Rugby Foundation covers many of the team's expenses from an endowment fund. Rugby is one of the largest sports programs on campus with over 100 players. Stanford Rugby is led by Director of Rugby Matt Sherman, who has served as an assistant coach for the U.S. men's national team.

From 1996 to 1998 Stanford reached the national semifinals in three consecutive years, finishing second in 1998. During the 2010–11 season, Stanford was champion of the Northern California conference, reached the national quarterfinals, and finished the season ranked 4th in D1-AA rugby. Following the 2011–12 season, Stanford were promoted to Division 1-A and played in the California conference, but have since returned to Division 1-AA and now play in the Pacific Western conference. Stanford won the Pacific Western conference in 2014, earning a berth in the D1-AA national playoffs, where they defeated Oregon 24–12 at home in front of a strong crowd, before losing to Arizona 27–24 in the quarterfinals.

== Championships ==
=== NCAA team championships ===
Stanford has won 139 NCAA team national championships, the most of any NCAA Division I school. Stanford has won these NCAA team championships in 20 different sports.

- Men's (71)
  - Baseball (2): 1987, 1988
  - Basketball (1): 1942
  - Cross country (4): 1996, 1997, 2002, 2003
  - Golf ^{†} (8): 1939, 1941, 1942, 1946, 1953, 1994, 2007, 2019
  - Gymnastics (11): 1992, 1993, 1995, 2009, 2011, 2019, 2021, 2022, 2023, 2024, 2026
  - Outdoor track & field (4): 1925 (unofficial), 1928, 1934, 2000
  - Soccer (3): 2015, 2016, 2017
  - Swimming (8): 1967, 1985, 1986, 1987, 1992, 1993, 1994, 1998
  - Tennis (17): 1973, 1974, 1977, 1978, 1980, 1981, 1983, 1986, 1988, 1989, 1990, 1992, 1995, 1996, 1997, 1998, 2000
  - Volleyball (2): 1997, 2010
  - Water polo (11): 1976, 1978, 1980, 1981, 1985, 1986, 1993, 1994, 2001, 2002, 2019
- Women's (68)
  - Basketball (3): 1990, 1992, 2021
  - Cross country (5): 1996, 2003, 2005, 2006, 2007
  - Golf (4): 2015, 2022, 2024, 2026
  - Rowing (3): 2009, 2023, 2025
  - Soccer (3): 2011, 2017, 2019
  - Swimming (11): 1983, 1989, 1992, 1993, 1994, 1995, 1996, 1998, 2017, 2018, 2019
  - Tennis (20): 1982, 1984, 1986–1991, 1997, 1999, 2001, 2002, 2004, 2005, 2006, 2010, 2013, 2016, 2018, 2019
  - Volleyball (9): 1992, 1994, 1996, 1997, 2001, 2004, 2016, 2018, 2019
  - Water polo (10): 2002, 2011, 2012, 2014, 2015, 2017, 2019, 2022, 2023, 2025

† The NCAA started sponsoring the intercollegiate golf championship in 1939, but it retained in its records the titles from the 41 championships previously conferred by the National Intercollegiate Golf Association, including Stanford's 1938 championship. However, the 1938 championship is not counted among Stanford's 139 NCAA team championships.

=== Other team national championships ===
Below are 40 team national titles in NCAA sports that were not bestowed by the NCAA:

- Men's (18)
  - Basketball (1): 1937 (retroactive Helms and Premo-Porretta selectors)
  - Football (2): 1926, 1940
  - Golf (1): 1938
  - Tennis (1): 1942 ^{‡}
  - Tennis (12) (indoor): 1973, 1975, 1976, 1978, 1985, 1990, 1992, 1994, 1995, 1998, 2000, 2002 (ITA)
  - Water polo (1): 1963 (coaches' poll)
- Women's (22)
  - Rowing (9) (lightweight): 2010, 2011, 2012, 2013, 2015, 2016, 2017, 2018, 2019 (IRA)
  - Swimming (1): 1980 (AIAW)
  - Tennis (1): 1978 (AIAW)
  - Tennis (10) (indoor): 1989, 1990, 1993, 1998, 2000, 2001, 2004, 2005, 2006, 2011 (ITA)
  - Water polo (1): 1985 (club team, USA Water Polo)

‡ Unofficial by virtue of winning both the collegiate individual and doubles crowns of the U.S. Lawn Tennis Association

Below are 53 team national titles won by Stanford varsity and club sports teams at the highest collegiate levels in non-NCAA sports:

- Men's (5)
  - Rugby (1) (Div. II): 2002
  - Sailing, offshore large boats (2): 1967, 1968
  - Ultimate (2): 1984, 2002
- Women's (33)
  - Archery (2) (recurve): 2006, 2007
  - Artistic swimming (11): 1998, 1999, 2005, 2006, 2007, 2008, 2013, 2016, 2021, 2025, 2026 (USA Synchro collegiate championships)
  - Rugby (4): 1999, 2005, 2006, 2008
  - Sailing (7): Women's Fleet Race, 2023–2026; Women's Team Race, 2024-2026. (ICSA)
  - Table tennis (1): 2006
  - Ultimate (8): 1997, 1998, 1999, 2003, 2005, 2006, 2007, 2016
- Combined (15)
  - Badminton (3): 1997, 1998, 1999
  - Canoe/Kayak (4) (flatwater): 2002, 2003, 2004, 2005
  - Cycling (4) (road): 1995, 1996, 1997, 2007
  - Sailing (3): Open Team Race, 1997; Open Fleet Race, 2023, 2025 (ICSA)
  - Taekwondo (1): 2013

=== Consecutive years winning NCAA team championships ===
Stanford has won at least one NCAA team championship in 50 consecutive academic years, starting in 1976–77 and continuing through 2025–26. This is the longest such streak in NCAA Division I history. The second-longest streak ever was 19 years, achieved by USC, which won at least one NCAA team championship every year from 1959–60 through 1977–78. As of the end of the 2025–26 academic year, the second-longest active streak is six years, shared by five schools: Notre Dame, Oklahoma, Texas, USC, and Virginia.

The most NCAA team championships Stanford has won in a single year is six in 1996–97 (men's and women's cross country, men's and women's tennis, and men's and women's volleyball) and again in 2018–19 (men's golf and gymnastics and women's volleyball, swimming, tennis and water polo). Stanford has won five NCAA team championships in a year three times (1991–92, 1994–95, and 1997–98). Stanford won three of the seven NCAA team championships awarded in the 2019–20 academic year, when, due to COVID, only the fall sports were contested.

Stanford has won two NCAA team championships in a single day three times: in men's and women's cross-country on November 25, 1996; in men's and women's cross-country on November 24, 2003; and in men's water polo and women's soccer on December 8, 2019.

=== NCAA individual championships ===
As of July, 2026, Stanford athletes have won 576 NCAA individual championships and 668 individual championships overall. Stanford's 576 individual championships are the most individual championships won by any school in NCAA Division I. No other Division I school is within 100 of Stanford's total.

== Directors' Cups ==
The NACDA Directors' Cup is awarded at the end of every academic year to the most successful overall sports program in NCAA Division I. As of the 2025-2026 academic year, it has been awarded 32 times. Stanford won the Directors' Cup 26 times, finished second 5 times, and finished third once. Stanford won 25 years in a row, from 1994–95 through 2018–19, and won again in 2022–23.

The Directors' Cup is awarded by the National Association of Collegiate Directors of Athletics (NACDA). The Directors' Cup rewards broad-based success in both men's and women's college sports. Points are awarded based on post-season success in NCAA-sponsored sports.

== Athletic facilities ==
- Arrillaga Center for Sports and Recreation — Fencing, squash
- Arrillaga Family Rowing and Sailing Center — Men's and women's rowing, Women's lightweight rowing, sailing
- Avery Aquatic Center — Men's and women's swimming and diving, women's artistic swimming, men's and women's water polo
- Burnham Pavilion — Men's and women's gymnastics, wrestling
- Cobb Track and Angell Field — Men's and women's track and field
- Klein Field at Sunken Diamond — Baseball
- Maloney Field at Laird Q. Cagan Stadium — Men's and women's soccer, women's lacrosse
- Maples Pavilion — Men's and women's basketball, men's and women's volleyball
- Red Barn — Equestrian
- Smith Family Stadium — Softball
- Stanford Beach Volleyball Stadium — Beach volleyball
- Stanford Golf Course — Men's and women's cross country, men's and women's golf
- Stanford Stadium — Football; also used for softball in the 2025 season during renovation of Smith Family Stadium
- Taube Tennis Center — Men's and women's tennis
- Varsity Field Hockey Turf — Women's field hockey

== Rivals ==
The Cardinal's rivals consist of California, Notre Dame, San Jose State, and USC, which all primarily evolved from American football.

== Olympics representation ==
Stanford athletes have traditionally been very well represented at the Summer Olympics. 196 Stanford-affiliated athletes have won a total of 335 Summer Olympic medals: 162 gold, 93 silver, 80 bronze. The table below lists the number of medals won by Stanford-affiliated athletes in recent Olympic Games.

Year	Location	medals	gold	silver	bronze	medalists	athletes
2024	Paris, France	39	12	14	13	26	59
2020	Tokyo, Japan	26	10	7	9	20	57
2016	Rio de Janeiro, Brazil	27	14	7	6	16	
2012	London, UK	17	12	2	3	16	39
2008	Beijing, China	25	8	13	4	24	47
2004	Athens, Greece	17	3	7	7	15	
2000	Sydney, Australia	11	4	3	4	8	
1996	Atlanta, Georgia	21	18	2	1	15	

Stanford does not compete at the varsity level in any events contested at the Winter Olympics. Stanford students and alums who have won Winter Olympic medals include Zoe Atkin, John Coyle, Eileen Gu, Eric Heiden, Sami Jo Small, and Debi Thomas. Most recently, at the 2026 Milano Cortino Winter Olympics, Eileen Gu medaled in all three women’s freestyle skiing events, winning gold in the freeski halfpipe, silver in slopestyle, and silver in big air. Zoe Atkin won bronze in the freeski halfpipe.

== Stanford Athletics Hall of Fame ==
The Stanford Athletics Hall of Fame was established on December 21, 1954. Envisioned by Walt Gamage, sports editor of the now-defunct Palo Alto Times, the first class of inductees consisted of 34 Stanford sports greats. New members are inducted annually and are recognized during halftime of a home Stanford football game. The Stanford Athletics Hall of Fame Room is located on the first floor of the Arrillaga Family Sports Center on the Stanford campus.

Sport	Hall of Fame members
Baseball	Mike Aldrete, Jeff Austin, Jeff Ballard, Bob Boone, Joe Borchard, Bobby Brown, Paul Carey, Joe Chez, Steve Davis, Bert Delmas, Mike Dotterer, Frank Duffy, Steve Dunning, Chuck Essegian, Dutch Fehring (coach), John Gall, Ryan Garko, Warren Goodrich, Jeffrey Hammonds, Eric Hardgrave, Jim Hibbs, A. J. Hinch, Ralph Holding, Ken Lilly, Jim Lonborg, Rick Lundblade, Mark Marquess (player and coach), David McCarty, Jack McDowell, Dave Melton, Lloyd Merriman, Pete Middlekauff, Bob Murphy, Mike Mussina, Kyle Peterson, Carlos Quentin, Larry Reynolds, Randy Rintala, Jack Shepard, Stan Spencer, Ed Sprague, Cook Sypher, Zeb Terry, Sandy Vance, Ray Young
Men's basketball	Forddy Anderson, John Arrillaga, Kimberly Belton, Mike Bratz, John Bunn (coach), Don Burness, Josh Childress, Jarron Collins, Jason Collins, Bill Cowden, Howie Dallmar (player and coach), Ken Davidson, Tom Dose, Everett Dean (coach), Don Griffin, Art Harris, Casey Jacobsen, Keith Jones, Adam Keefe, Rich Kelley, Brevin Knight, Arthur Lee, Todd Lichti, Hank Luisetti, Mark Madsen, Nip McHose, Mike Montgomery (coach), Bryan "Dinty" Moore, Paul Neumann, Jim Pollard, Chasson Randle, John Revelli, Swede Righter, Harlow Rothert, George Selleck, Art Stoefen, Claude Terry, Ron Tomsic, Sebron "Ed" Tucker, Ed Voss, Jim Walsh, Don Williams, Howard Wright, George Yardley
Women's basketball	Jayne Appel, Jennifer Azzi, Kristin Folkl, Sonja Henning, Jeanne Ruark Hoff, Chiney Ogwumike, Nneka Ogwumike, Jeanette Pohlen, Nicole Powell, Olympia Scott, Kate Starbird, Katy Steding, Trisha Stevens, Tara VanDerveer (coach), Val Whiting, Candice Wiggins
Men's cross country	Brad Hauser, Don Kardong, Bob King, Harry McCalla, Duncan Macdonald
Women's cross country	Monal Chokshi, Alicia Craig, Lauren Fleshman, Ceci Hopp, Arianna Lambie, PattiSue Plumer, Kim Schnurpfeil-Griffin, Alison Wiley Rochon
Men's diving	Rick Schavone (coach)
Women's diving	Cassidy Krug, Eileen Richetelli, Rick Schavone (coach)
Fencing	Nick Bravin, Al Snyder, Felicia Zimmermann
Field hockey	Onnie Killefer, Nancy White-Lippe
Football	Frankie Albert, Frank Alustiza, Bruno Banducci, Benny Barnes, Guy Benjamin, John Brodie, Jackie Brown, George Buehler, Don Bunce, Chris Burford, Ernie Caddel, Gordy Ceresino, Jack Chapple, Toi Cook, Bill Corbus, Murray Cuddeback, Ed Cummings, David DeCastro, Dud DeGroot, Steve Dils, Pat Donovan, Mike Dotterer, John Elway, Chuck Evans, Skip Face, Hugh Gallarneau, Bobby Garrett, Ron George, Toby Gerhart, Bobby Grayson, Bob "Bones" Hamilton, Ray Handley, Walt Heinecke, Tony Hill, Biff Hoffman, Kevin Hogan, Brian Holloway, Dick Horn, Dick Hyland, Alex Karakozoff, Gary Kerkorian, Gordon King, Pete Kmetovic, Jim Lawson, Pete Lazetich, Vic Lindskog, James Lofton, Andrew Luck, John Lynch, Norm Manoogian, Owen Marecic, Ken Margerum, Ed McCaffrey, Bill McColl, Duncan McColl, Hal McCreery, Glyn Milburn, Phil Moffatt, Bob Moore, Sam Morley, Monk Moscrip, Wes Muller, Brad Muster, Darrin Nelson, Ernie Nevers, Dick Norman, Blaine Nye, Don Parish, John Paye, Jim Plunkett, Seraphim Post, John Ralston (coach), Bob Reynolds, Don Robesky, Ken Rose, Harlow Rothert, John Sande III, Clark Shaughnessy (coach), Harry Shipkey, Ted Shipkey, Jeff Siemon, Bob Sims, Malcolm Snider, Norm Standlee, Steve Stenstrom, Roger Stillwell, Bill Tarr, Chuck Taylor (player, coach and athletic director), Stepfan Taylor, Dink Templeton, Keith Topping, Tommy Vardell, Randy Vataha, Garin Veris, Bill Walsh (coach), Pop Warner (coach), Gene Washington, Bob Whitfield, Paul Wiggin (player and coach), Tank Williams, Kailee Wong, Dave Wyman
Men's golf	Notah Begay, Warren Berl, Bud Brownell, Bob Cardinal, Art Doering, Don Edwards, Bud Finger (coach), Wally Goodwin (coach), Lawson Little, Dick McElyea, Malcolm MacNaughton, Patrick Rodgers, Bob Rosburg, Charles Seaver, Steve Smith, Frank "Sandy" Tatum, Eddie Twiggs (coach), Tom Watson, Tiger Woods
Women's golf	Patricia Cornett, Larissa Fontaine, Shelley Hamlin, Kathleen McCarthy-Scrivner, Mhairi McKay, Anne Quast-Sander, Sally Voss Krueger, Mickey Wright
Men's gymnastics	Dan Gill, Steve Hug, Jon Louis, Jair Lynch, Ted Marcy, Josh Stein
Women's gymnastics	Larissa Fontaine, Carly Janiga, Tabitha Yim
Women's lacrosse	Laura Shane
Men's rowing	Dan Ayrault, James Fifer, Conn Findlay (coach), Duvall Hecht, Kent Mitchell, Edward P. Ferry, Kurt Seiffert
Women's rowing	Elle Logan, Grace Fattal Luczak, Erika Roddy, Cathy Thaxton-Tippett
Rugby	Marty Feldman, Joe Neal, Dick Ragsdale
Sailing	Anika Leerssen
Skiing	Bob Blatt
Men's soccer	Klas Bergman, Harry Maloney (coach), Ryan Nelsen
Women's soccer	Nicole Barnhart, Rachel Buehler, Jessica Fischer, Julie Foudy, Teresa Noyola, Sarah Rafanelli, Kelley O'Hara, Christen Press, Ali Riley
Softball	Sarah Beeson Andersen, Ashley Hansen, Lauren Lappin, Jessica Mendoza, Dana Sorensen
Men's swimming	Bob Anderson, Ernie Brandsten (coach), Mike Bruner, Greg Buckingham, Emmet Cashin, Austin Clapp, Pete Desjardins, Dave Fall, John Ferris, Wade Flemons, James Gaughran, Kurt Grote, Paul Hait, George Harrison, Tom Haynie (coach), John Hencken, Marty Hull, Kristian Ipsen, Brian Job, Skip Kenney (coach), Jeff Kostoff, John Moffett, Robin Moore, Pablo Morales, Jay Mortenson, Anthony Mosse, Sean Murphy, Wally O'Connor, Clarence Pinkston, Brian Retterer, Jeff Rouse, Dick Roth, Ralph Sala, Al White, Ted Wiget, Tom Wilkens
Women's swimming	Marjorie Gestring Bowman, Elaine Breeden, Sharon Stouder Clark, Maya DiRado Andrews, Marybeth Linzmeier Dorst, Catherine Fox, Sharon Geary Gee, George Haines (coach), Brenda Helser De Morelos, Misty Hyman, Jenna Johnson-Younker, Janel Jorgensen, Tara Kirk, Lea Loveless Maurer, Susan Rapp von der Lippe, Eileen Richetelli, Shelly Ripple, Chris von Saltza Olmstead, Summer Sanders, Julia Smit, Jenny Thompson
Artistic swimming	Sara Lowe, Heather Olson
Men's tennis	Bob Bryan, Mike Bryan, Joe Coughlin, Jim Davies, Laurence Dee, Jim Delaney, Bennett Dey, John Doeg, Jack Douglas, Jack Frost, Keith Gledhill, Dan Goldie, Paul Goldstein, Dick Gould (coach), Alan Herrington, Cranston Holman, Alex Kim, Sam Lee, Alex Mayer, Tim Mayotte, Ralph McElvenny, John McEnroe, Patrick McEnroe, Matt Mitchell, R. Lindley Murray, Philip Neer, Alex O'Brien, Jared Palmer, Ted Schroeder, William Seward, Roscoe Tanner, James Wade, John Whitlinger
Women's tennis	Jane Albert Willens, Julia Anthony, Sandra Birch, Frank Brennan (coach), Erin Burdette, Patty Fendick-McCain, Linda Gates, Nicole Gibbs, Laura Granville, Debbie Graham, Susan Hagey Wall, Carol Hanks, Julie Heldman, Barbara Jordan, Kathy Jordan, Amber Liu, Diane Morrison Shropshire, Meredith McGrath, Alycia Moulton, Lilia Osterloh
Men's track and field	Terry Albritton, Gaylord Bryan, Otis Chandler, Ernie Cunliffe, Gordon Dunn, Hec Dyer, Ben Eastman, Ward Edmonds, Tiny Hartranft, Brad Hauser, Bud Held, Clyde Jeffrey, Gabe Jennings, Payton Jordan (coach), Don Kardong, Bob King, Morris Kirksey, Sam Klopstock, Eric Krenz, Henri Laborde, Hugo "Swede" Leistner, James Lofton, Leo Long, John Lyman, Harry McCalla, Duncan MacDonald, Ray Malott, Bob Mathias, August Meier, Bill Miller, Ted Miller, Larry Questad, Jim Reynolds, Bill Richardson, Harlow Rothert, Bud Spencer, Toby Stevenson, Bob Stoecker, Dink Templeton (coach), Jack Weiershauser, Dave Weill, Pete Zagar
Women's track and field	Lisa Bernhagen, Carol Cady, Kori Carter, Monal Chokshi, Alicia Craig, Pam Dukes, Jackie Edwards, Lauren Fleshman, Ceci Hopp, Arianna Lambie, Tracye Lawyer, Erica McLain, PattiSue Plumer, Kim Schnurpfeil-Griffin, Katerina Stefanidi, Alison Wiley Rochon
Men's volleyball	Canyon Ceman, Scott Fortune, Matt Fuerbringer, Dan Hanan, Michael Lambert, Jon Root, Erik Shoji, Kawika Shoji
Women's volleyball	Inky Ajanaku, Foluke Akinradewo, Kristin Klein Keefe, Alix Klineman, Ogonna Nnamani, Beverly Oden, Kim Oden, Wendi Rush, Lisa Sharpley-Vanacht, Don Shaw (coach), Teresa Smith-Richardson, Logan Tom, Kerri Walsh, Cary Wendell Wallin
Men's water polo	Tony Azevedo, James Bergeson, Doug Burke, Jody Campbell, Austin Clapp, Dante Dettamanti (coach), Chris Dorst, Charles K. Fletcher, John Gansel, James Gaughran, Marty Hull, Craig Klass, Drew McDonald, Alan Mouchawar, Wally O'Connor, John Parker, Gary Sheerer, Ted Wiget
Women's water polo	Margie Dingeldein, Annika Dries, Ellen Estes, Jackie Frank, Kiley Neushul, Melissa Seidemann, Brenda Villa
Wrestling	Nick Amuchastegui, Tanner Gardner, Matt Gentry, Vern Jones
Service	Ted Leland (athletic director), Don Liebendorfer (sports information director), Linda Meier, Sam MacDonald (grounds superintendent), Al Masters (athletic director), George Shultz

== See also ==
- 2019 college admissions bribery scandal
