= Arrillaga Family Rowing and Sailing Center =

Sailing center in Redwood City, California

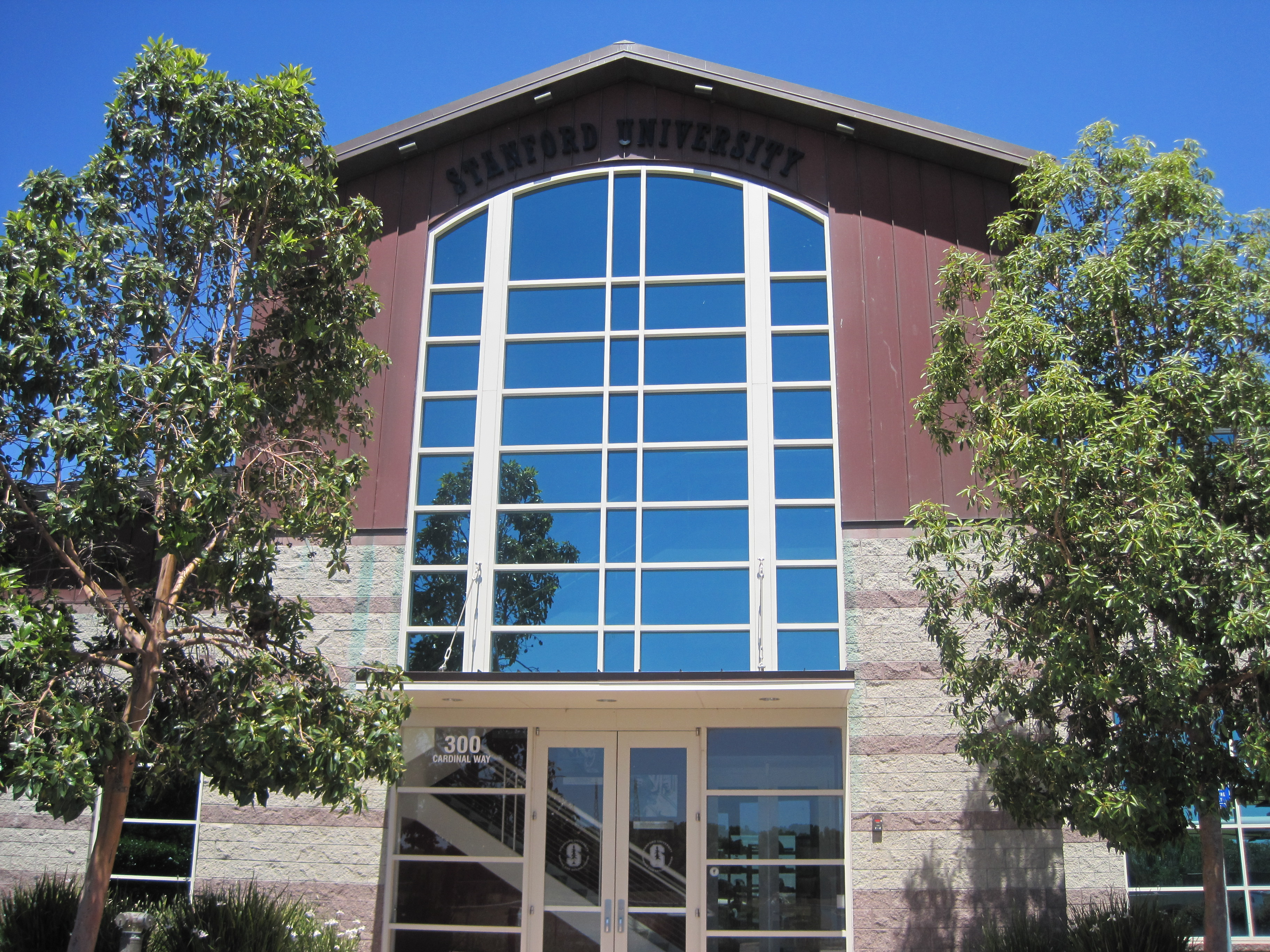
- Front of the Rowing & Sailing Center
- Named after: John Arrillaga
- Established: 1905; 121 years ago
- Founded at: Redwood City, California
- Type: Educational organization
- Purpose: Recreational
- Location: 300 Cardinal Way, Redwood City, California, 94063
- Coordinates: 37°30′17″N 122°13′05″W
- Region served: San Francisco Peninsula
- Services: Rowing and sailing
- Men's Head Coach: Craig Amerkhanian
- Women's Head Coach: Derek Byrnes
- Main organ: Stanford Cardinal
- Parent organization: Stanford University
- Affiliations: PCCSC
- Website: Facility Website
- Formerly called: Stanford Boathouse

The Stanford University Arrillaga Family Rowing and Sailing Center (or Stanford Rowing and Sailing Center) is a boating facility utilized by Stanford Cardinal Athletics for sailing and rowing sporting activities. It is located at the Port of Redwood City along Redwood creek in Redwood City, California.

== History ==
The Stanford Rowing and Sailing Center has a long history dating back to 1905 when undergraduates at the university saw a need for a boathouse for intercollegiate competition. The first boathouse was constructed along Redwood Creek and remained active for the next 10 years there.

In 1913, another boathouse was built on campus on the edge of Lake Lagunita for Freshmen, spring practice, and campus recreation. Due to the onset of the World War I, rowing dwindled in popularity and revenues fell from sporting events; there was no longer any way to financially support the rowing team.

In 1929, the student body voted to reinstate crew as a sport and acquiring boats and shells with which to compete. In 1940 the Cardinal Crew made a comeback once again and with a new boathouse at the Redwood City Harbor. However, once again, the onset of war (this time World War II) brought the end of rowing, and the new boathouse was locked up. Use of the boathouse only resumed in 1947.

=== Modern day ===
In 2004, there was resistance from homeowners in Redwood Shores to having Stanford boats stored near their properties. This in part spurred forward the building of the current center which still stands today.

The modern Stanford Rowing and Sailing Center is located alongside Redwood Creek in Redwood City and was built in 2003 to replace older facilities. It is a 16,500 square feet (1,530 m^{2}) boathouse that cost US$5,000,000 to build. The building was designed by Hoover Associates and contains accommodation for both men's and women's crew and sailing with a second level with locker areas, exercise facilities, and a large function room. The center also hosts many youth rowing and sailing groups, often sharing dock and launch space with the nearby Marine Science Institute.

== Gallery ==
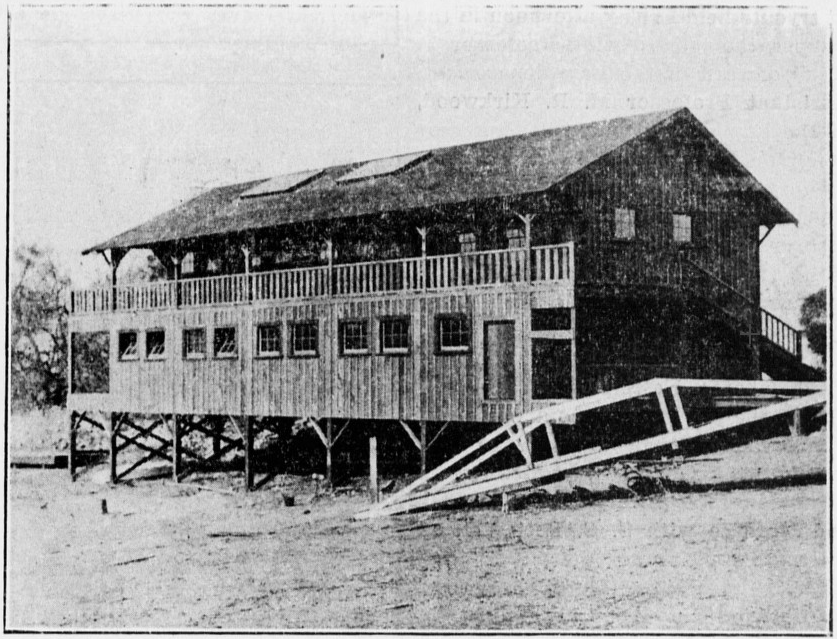
Boathouse located on the edge of Lake Lagunita built in 1913.

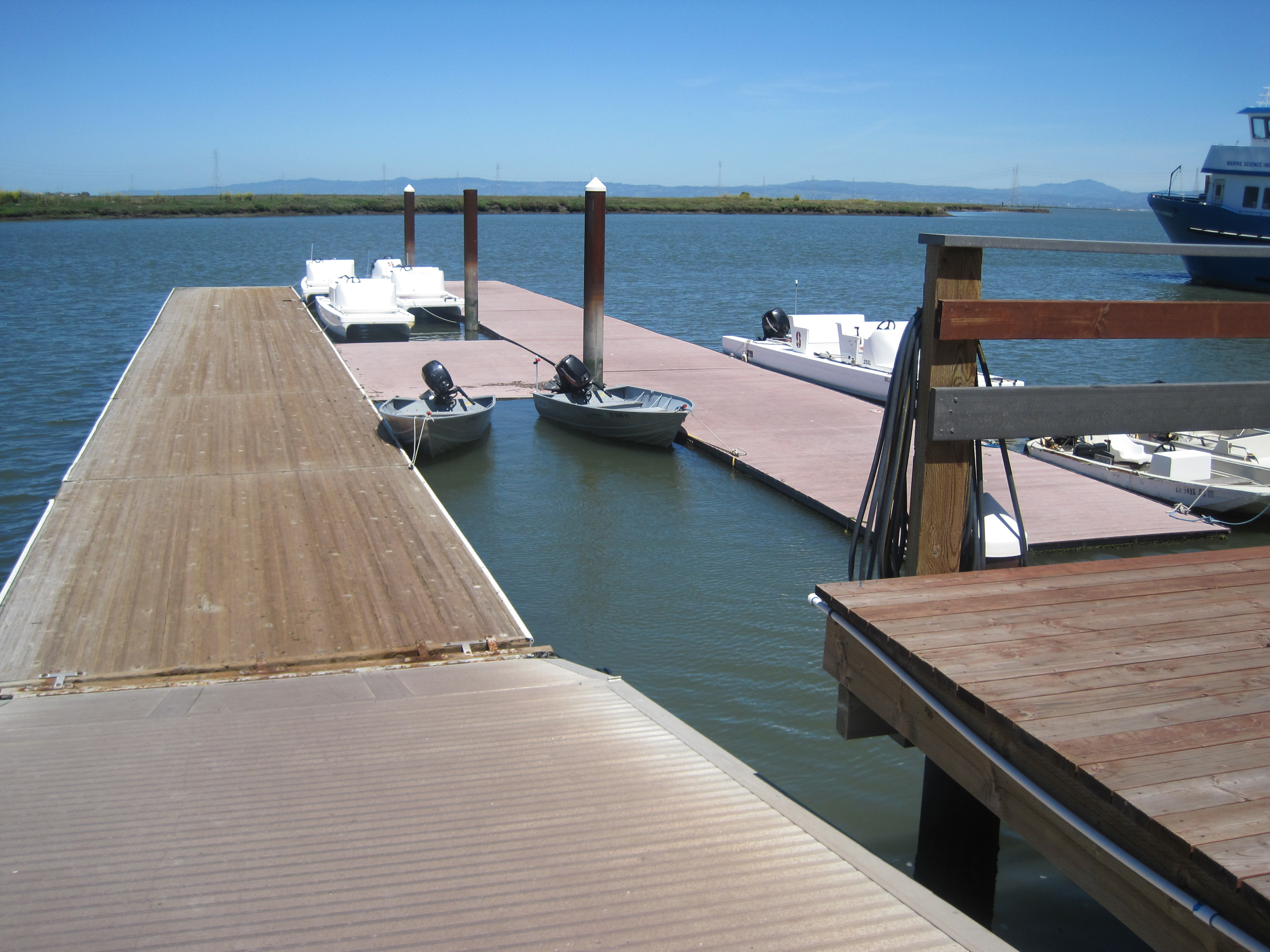
Launch piers

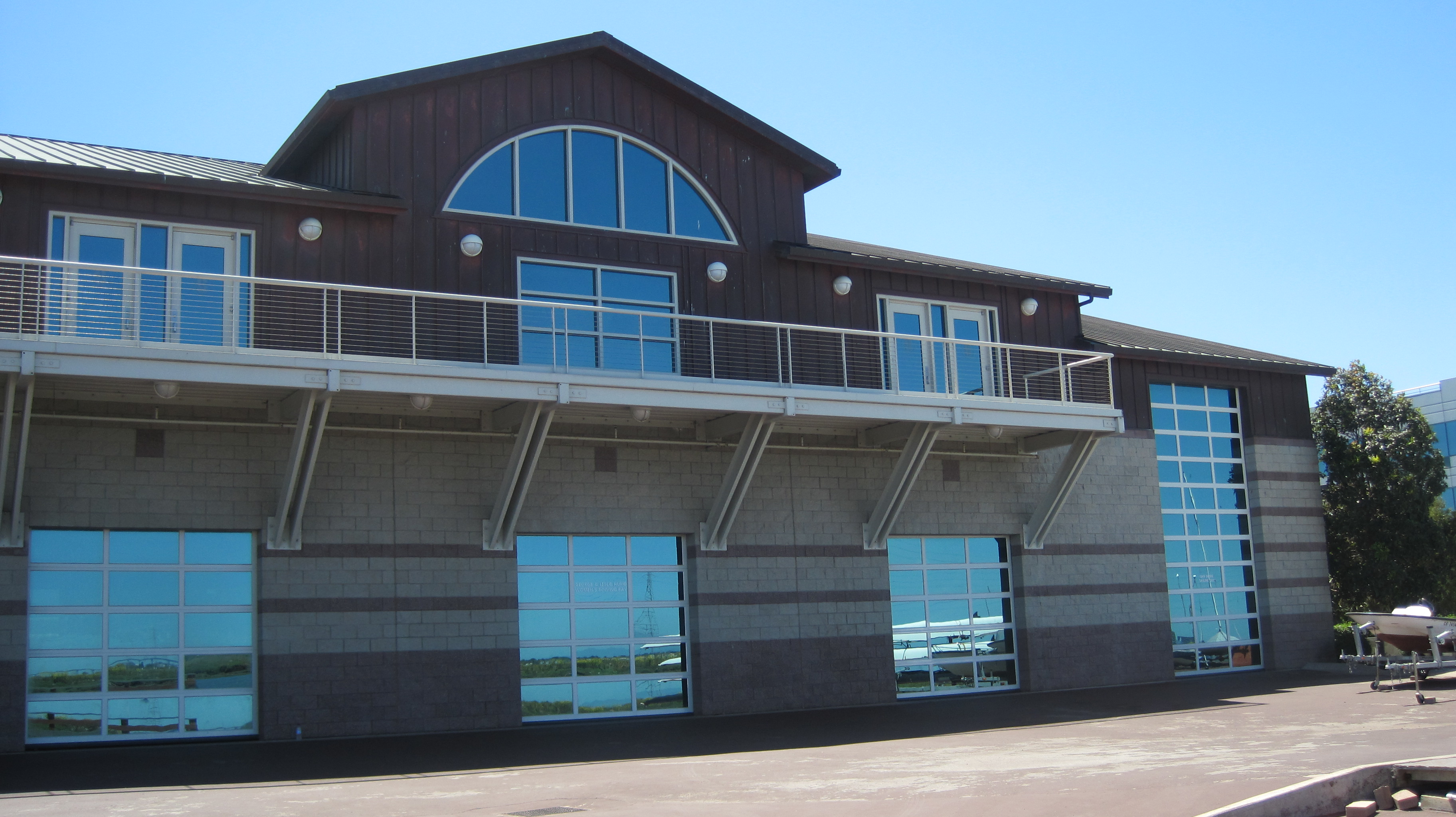
Rear of the center

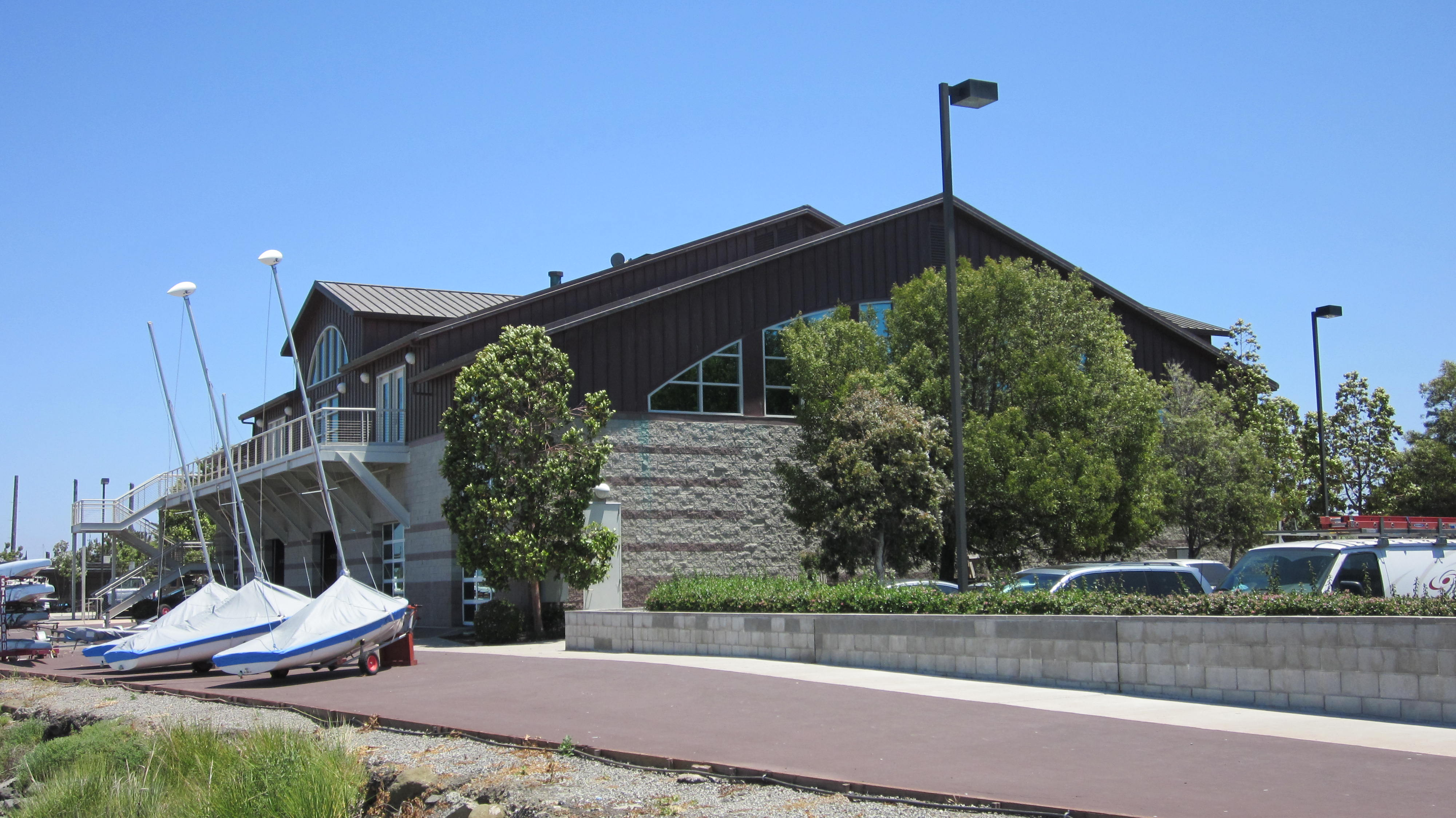
Side view with boats

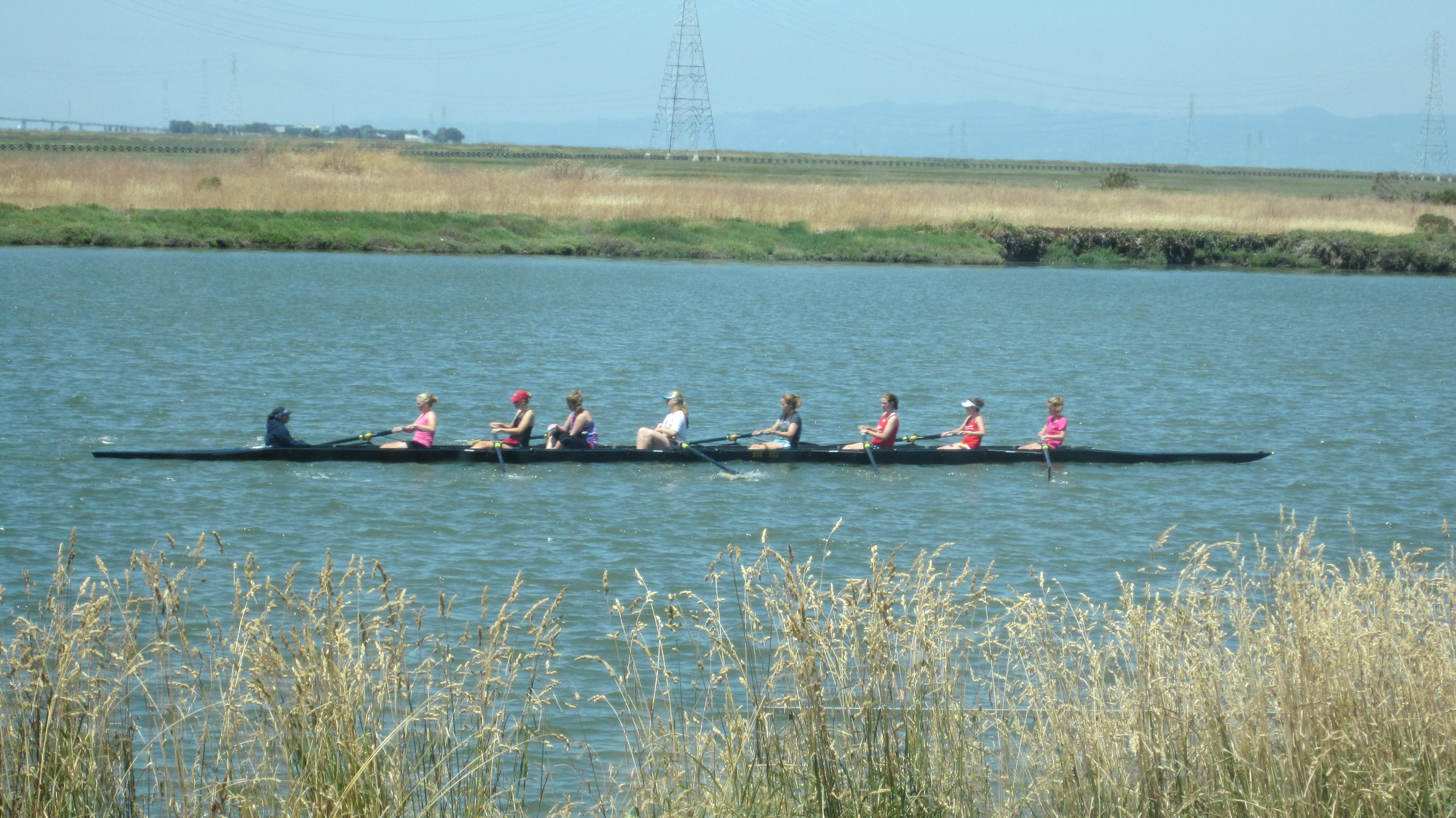
Rowing on Redwood Creek

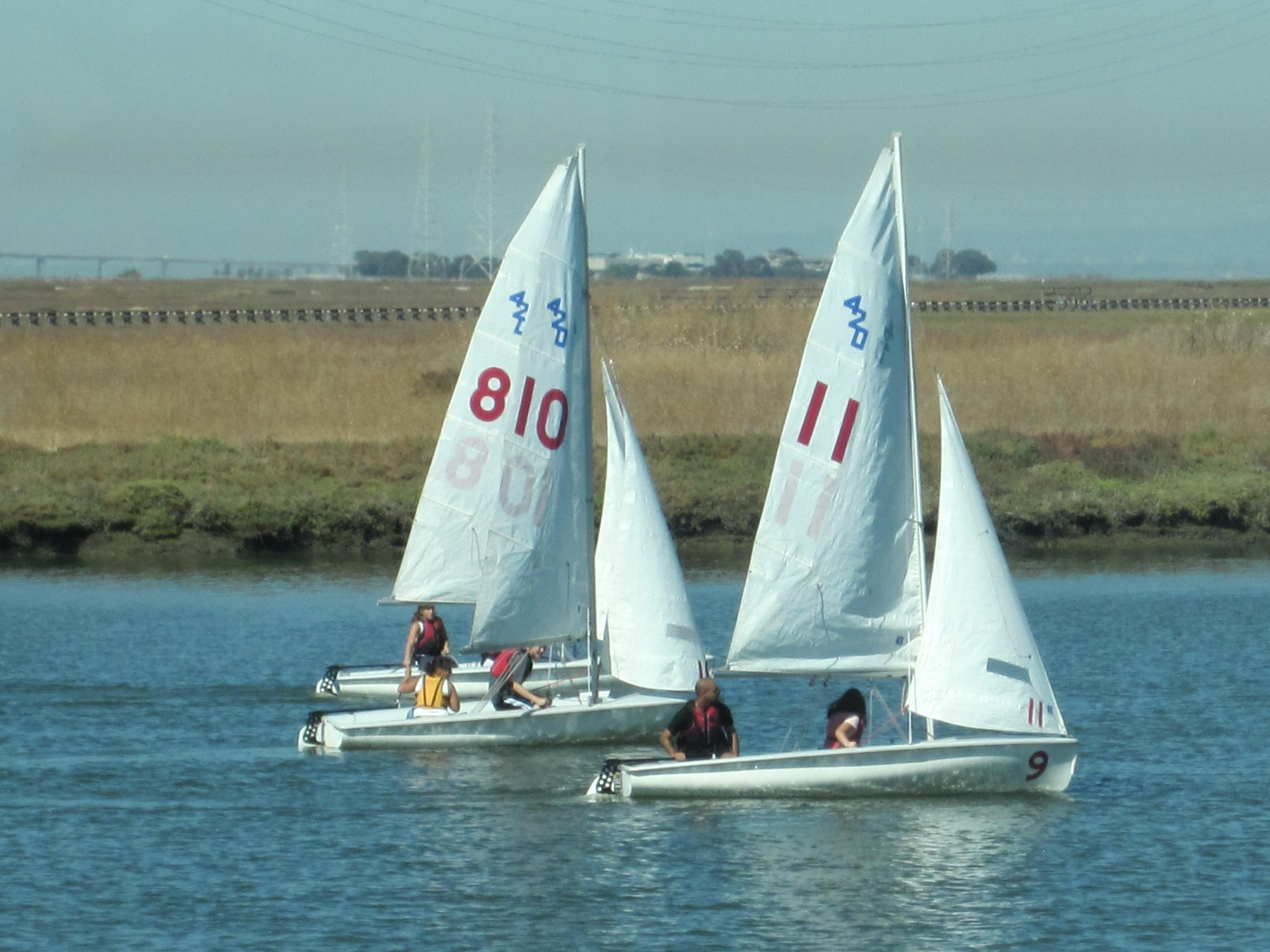
Close quarters sailing

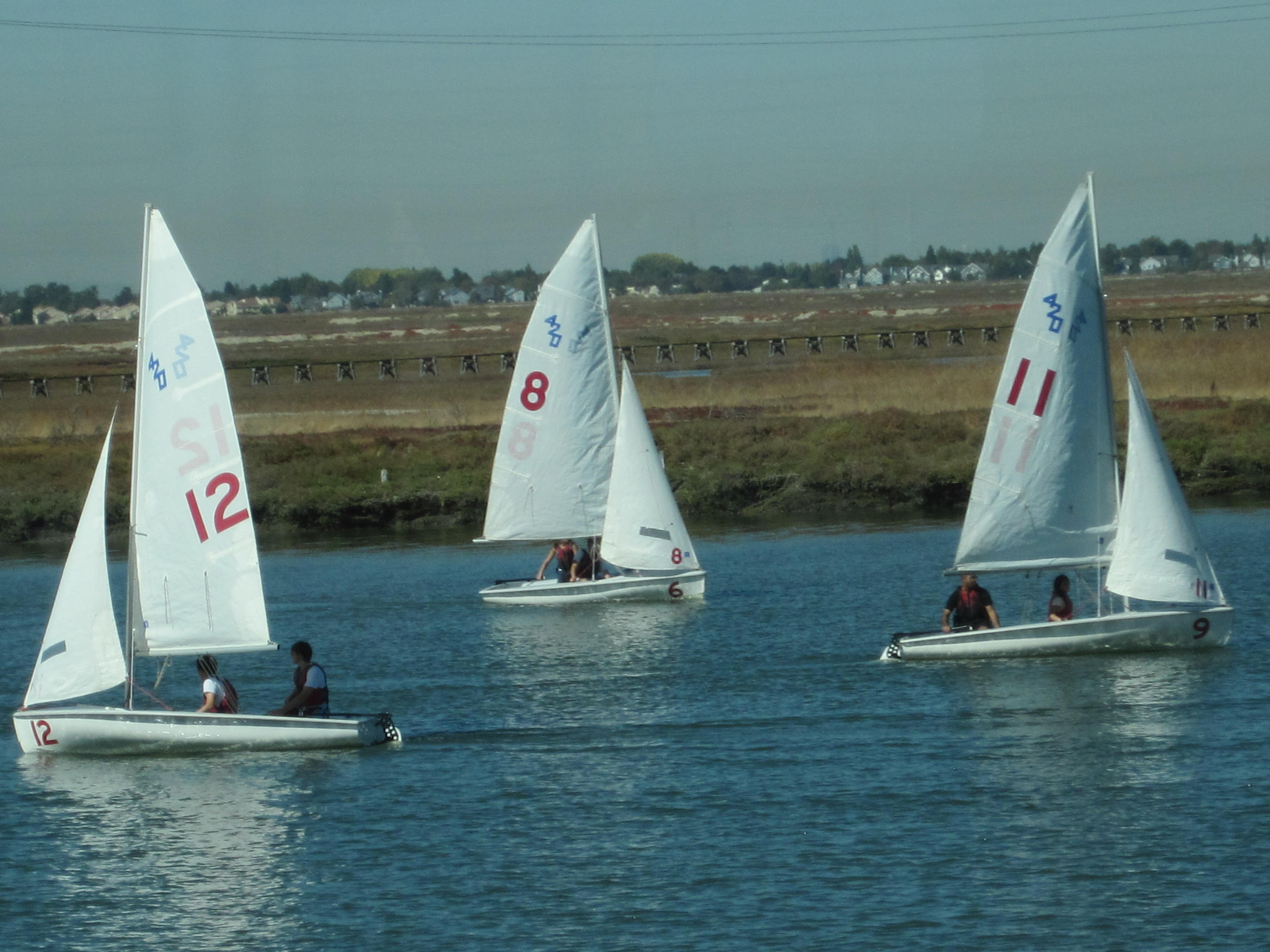
Sailing practice

== See also ==
- College rowing (United States)
- Inter-Collegiate Sailing Association
