= Sequoia Yacht Club =

Private, member-owned sailing club

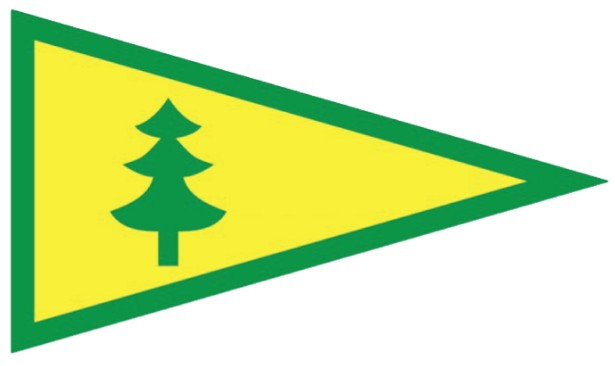
- Burgee of Sequoia Yacht Club
- Founded: 1939
- Location: 441 Seaport Court, Redwood City, California 94063, United States
- Focus: Recreational boating and sailing
- Website: www.sequoiayc.org

Sequoia Yacht Club is a private, member‑owned sailing club in the Port of Redwood City on the San Francisco Peninsula in Redwood City, California. Established in 1939, the club organizes cruising and racing for keelboats and dinghies on the South San Francisco Bay and operates a junior sailing program on Redwood Creek.

Front entrance of the Sequoia Yacht Club in Redwood City, California

== History ==
Sequoia Yacht Club was founded in 1939 by boat owners based in Redwood City who formed a separate association to promote small‑boat cruising and racing on the southern part of San Francisco Bay. The club later obtained a site within the Port of Redwood City and developed a clubhouse and berthing for member boats.

The Port of Redwood City is one of four deep‑water ports on San Francisco Bay that can accommodate visiting yachts, along with San Francisco, Oakland and Stockton. Since the mid‑20th century the club has added youth instruction and charity regattas to its activities, including events that raise funds for local educational and sailing programs.

== Facilities and guest berths ==
The club occupies a single‑story clubhouse on Seaport Court within the Port of Redwood City, facing the municipal marina and the port's deep‑water turning basin.

Visiting boats can obtain berths through the Port of Redwood City's municipal marina or, on a limited basis, by arrangement through the club's port‑captain for reciprocal yacht‑club visits and regatta participants.

== Keelboat sailing and cruising ==
Sequoia Yacht Club organizes keelboat racing on the South Bay for a mixed fleet of cruising and racing designs, including boats between about 30 and 42 feet and an Open 5.70 one‑design group. Boats from the club occasionally appear in regional sailing media, including Latitude 38 coverage of South Bay racing and photo features from the Redwood Creek area.

The club runs a program of weekend regattas and evening handicap races during the sailing season, and some of its events form part of the Yacht Racing Association of San Francisco Bay's weekend series. In addition to racing, Sequoia Yacht Club publishes a cruising schedule for trips to other marinas and yacht clubs around San Francisco Bay and the California coast.

== Junior sailing ==
The club operates a junior sailing program on Redwood Creek for young people. A 2025 survey of youth sailing by Latitude 38 lists Sequoia among Bay Area clubs offering multi‑week instructional courses using small dinghies and notes that its junior sessions take place in the sheltered basin at the Port of Redwood City. Instruction is delivered in club‑owned dinghies such as El Toros, Lasers and RS Zests, with classes that cover boat handling, basic racing skills and seamanship.

== Regattas ==
Sequoia Yacht Club hosts several open regattas each year that attract sailors from other Bay Area clubs, including events on the Yacht Racing Association weekend calendar and women's‑series racing. The Westpoint Regatta, run jointly by Sequoia Yacht Club, Treasure Island Yacht Club and Westpoint Harbor, is a destination race from central San Francisco Bay to Redwood City that forms part of the YRA Weekend Regatta Series.

The club also hosts the Hannig Cup, a charity regatta established in 2006 that combines a short South Bay race with on‑shore fundraising for Peninsula‑based youth and community organizations. Coverage in Latitude 38 and other local publications has described the event's role in raising funds for programs in areas such as youth sailing, marine science and health‑related charities.

== Membership ==
Membership at Sequoia Yacht Club is open to boat owners and non‑owners and follows a sponsor‑based application process set out in the club's bylaws and membership information.
