= Agiloft =

Contract lifecycle management and business process software company

Coordinates: 37°31′24″N 122°15′30″W

Agiloft, Inc.
- Agiloft Logo
- Formerly: Integral Solutions Corporation
- Type: Private
- Industry: Contract Lifecycle Management
- Founded: October 12, 1990; 36 years ago in Redwood City, California, United States
- Founder: Colin Earl
- Headquarters: Redwood City, California, United States
- Area served: Worldwide
- Key people: Eric Laughlin (CEO)
- Website: www.agiloft.com

Agiloft, Inc. is a technology company specializing in contract lifecycle management and business process management software headquartered in Redwood City, California. It was originally founded in October 1990 as Integral Solutions Corporation.

== History ==
Agiloft started as Integral Solutions Corporation founded by Colin Earl in 1990. The company worked on development projects for other corporations until developing its own software in 1996 called SupportWizard. SupportWizard was designed as a help desk application and by 1999 officially supported MySQL. For a time the company was known by the name of the SupportWizard software.

In 2003, they announced a new revision of the software operating on J2EE framework called Enterprise Wizard.

By 2007 the company offered a platform version of the software, called SaaSWizard, on which users could automate business actions through their own customization. Development continued on the EnterpriseWizard application operating on top of the platform allowing users to customize the program through a web interface. Colin Earl changed both the business and software name to Agiloft in 2012.

In 2020, Eric Laughton was named CEO. In May 2024, the global investment firm KKR & Co. acquired a majority stake in Agiloft.

In January 2025, Agiloft announced the acquisition of Screens, a developer of a generative AI-based contract management software. In December 2025, Agiloft introduced Obligation Management, an artificial intelligence-based feature designed to automatically identify and track contractual obligations.

== Products and technology ==
The company develops the Agiloft low-code development platform for contract lifecycle management, including automation. The software has prebuilt modules that focus on contract management and IT service management. It includes AI-based Obligation Management, a feature for automatically identifying and tracking contractual obligations.

== See also ==
- Project management
- Cloud computing
