= Andy Witt =

American volleyball player (born 1978)

Personal information
- Full name: Andrew Elmore Witt
- Born: March 21, 1978 (age 48); Santa Ynez, California, U.S.
- Hometown: Santa Ynez, California, U.S.
- Height: 6 ft 6 in (198 cm)
- Education: Stanford University

Volleyball information
- Position: Opposite hitter
- Number: 17 (national team)

National team
| 1998–2000 | United States |

Andrew Elmore Witt (born March 21, 1978) is an American former volleyball player. He played for the United States national team at the 2000 Summer Olympics in Sydney, Australia.

== College ==
Witt played college volleyball for Stanford University and helped his team to its first NCAA Championship title in 1997. He was an All-American in 1998.

== Awards ==
- NCAA Champion 1997
- All-American 1998
