= Phoenix Five (prank) =

The Stanford Tree as a blindfolded hostage in a picture released to the Daily Californian by the Phoenix Five, October 1998

The Phoenix Five were a group of five University of California, Berkeley (Cal) students in Theta Chi who stole the Stanford Tree from the Band Shak on the campus of Stanford University in the early morning hours of October 17, 1998. The Phoenix Five held the 10-foot-tall (3.0 m) costume and university's unofficial mascot "hostage" for two weeks, and the reaction to the heist by school administrators fueled a frenzy of media coverage which resulted in the prank being regarded as one of the most famous and notable in the history of the Big Game rivalry between UC Berkeley and Stanford. The Phoenix Five used pseudonyms to hide their true identities, going by Mr. Black, Mr. Green, Mr. Orange, Mr. White, and Mr. Yellow.

== The theft of the tree ==
The five Cal students were all members of the Mu chapter of Theta Chi fraternity, and drove to the campus of Stanford University as part of a brotherhood activity. Their initial intent was to steal signs from the campus, as was a common prank in the lead-up to the Big Game, the annual football game between Cal and Stanford. Upon arrival, the students discovered that "Cardinal Chaos" was taking place that night, the first practice of the Stanford men's and women's basketball teams. Posing as Stanford students, the Five entered the event at Maples Pavilion and contemplated pulling a prank during the festivities, but failed to find any legitimate opportunity to do so. After the conclusion of Cardinal Chaos, the Five were by their car in an adjacent parking lot when they saw the Stanford Tree being taken away from the event by its handler, Chris Henderson. Interested in where the hated rival mascot was headed, the Five followed it and Henderson to the old Stanford Band Shak, the home of the Stanford Band. Discovering that a party was going on inside the Shak and now interested in the potential of getting close to the Tree, the Five decided to wait and see if the building would be fully vacated at some point during the early morning hours.

Returning to the Band Shak at approximately 4 a.m., the Five determined that the band's party had ended, although reconnaissance work was needed to ensure that no Stanford Band members were still inside of the building. As three of the group kept watch outside, the remaining two members entered the Band Shak through an open window and managed to locate the Tree after going through an old medical library and a wall. After procuring the Tree, the Five brought it out of the Band Shak through the front door, and quickly managed to squeeze it into the back of Mr. Green's car. As it would have taken a decent amount of time to fit three of the group's members into the back seat as well, the Tree was driven away from the Stanford campus and left in a nearby Palo Alto neighborhood. Once all five members returned to this safer location, they managed to fit themselves and the Tree into the car and drive back across the San Francisco Bay to the safe confines of the University of California.

The group later described the event as a "crime of opportunity", noting that they had no plans to steal the Tree upon arriving on the Stanford campus, and only happened to find it unattended the morning after seeing it at Cardinal Chaos.

== The "Phoenix Five" name and initial correspondence ==
Once safely back in Berkeley, the Five kept knowledge of the heist strictly limited, not even telling other members of their fraternity about what had transpired. The Tree was kept in Mr. Black's room at the chapter house as the group waited to see what, if any, reaction would result from the theft. The thought that nothing would come of their efforts quickly vanished as the story broke on October 23 in The Stanford Daily student newspaper, almost a week after the event. From the outset, there was little doubt that Cal students were responsible for the Tree's disappearance. In the initial Stanford Daily story, Henderson said that he believed three or four people had followed him out of Maples Pavilion to the Band Shak on the night in question. He also indicated that a neighbor had found "Bears" written in shaving cream on a bathroom wall of his residence the next morning (something the Phoenix Five later denied responsibility for).

Once the story broke, the five students decided to establish an identity and claim responsibility for the heist. The "Phoenix Five" name was decided upon because of the obvious alliteration and fact that it had internal significance within the fraternity. The Phoenix alluded to the mythical bird that rises from the ashes and never dies, not to the Arizona city. The Phoenix Five first claimed responsibility for "liberating" the Tree in an October 26 front-page story in The Daily Californian, Cal's student newspaper. In the article, the Five took the opportunity to poke fun at their school rivals. They proclaimed that the Tree deserved to get out of Stanford, but would return before Big Game "even though he knows that Stanford is full of a bunch of weenies." The Five also submitted an anonymous letter, signed by "the Stanford Tree," indicating the Tree was no longer happy at Stanford and had learned the value of work, diversity and spirit while on the Cal campus. The mascot also indicated that he had been introduced to the outside world where people are different and actually love their school.

The letter and accompanying picture of the blindfolded Tree was perhaps the most famous correspondence during the two-week ordeal, as it served to show that the Phoenix Five had no hostile intentions and were only interested in humorously promoting the Cal-Stanford rivalry in the weeks leading up to Big Game. Henderson, on his part, responded to the correspondence by challenging the Phoenix Five to escalate their efforts and kidnap him, as he proclaimed, "I am the Tree...stop talking to a pile of fabric and show a little backbone."

The Stanford Tree is paraded in front of KTVU TV cameras by members of the Phoenix Five, October 1998.

== Reaction by school officials/police ==
Despite the promise to safely return the Tree to Stanford before Big Game, school administrators and campus police from both universities reacted harshly to the prank, and this reaction and the subsequent student response fueled a storm of local and national media coverage.

From the outset, police treated the heist as a serious crime. Noting that the value of the Tree was over $1000 (Henderson claimed that its functional value was worth "millions"), police indicated that the crime would be considered a felony. UC Berkeley Chancellor Robert Berdahl also reacted strongly to the actions of the Phoenix Five by releasing a brusquely worded statement calling the heist an "outright theft". The Chancellor also issued an ultimatum, stating that Cal's mascot, Oski the Bear, would not be allowed to appear at the team's next football game at Oregon State unless the Tree was returned to the UC Police Department by midnight on October 28. (It was later discovered that Oski had no plans to make the trip to Oregon State, in any event.) Bay Area television news crews reported live outside of the UC Police Department the night of the deadline, but the Tree was not returned.

Instead of returning the Tree by the midnight deadline, the Phoenix Five summoned local media to an empty parking lot in the Oakland Hills and paraded the costume in front of KTVU Channel 2 television cameras, for the purpose of assuring the public that the Tree was still intact. The Phoenix Five reiterated their initial comments that the Tree would be returned to Stanford unharmed before Big Game. Despite these reassurances, Stanford police retained their hardline stance, as Captain Raoul Niemeyer stated, "[i]f you do the crime, you do the time."

Reaction by students at both campuses and members of the public was generally disapproving of the actions by police and administrators. Students at Cal were particularly disappointed at the reaction by their own Chancellor to the heist, which they thought served to squelch long-standing traditions in the rivalry between Cal and Stanford. This negative sentiment was a major point of discussion in the media coverage of the event. In addition to the heist being mentioned in Sports Illustrated, two ransoms were offered for the Tree's return in Bay Area newspapers, including one of $5,000 from an Internet sporting goods supplier, which would go to a charitable Christmas tree fundraising drive.

The consistent pressure by officials, while sparking negative reaction and media coverage, eventually paid off, as the Phoenix Five decided to return the Tree two weeks after "liberating" it from the Stanford campus.

== The return of the tree ==
As more and more people inside the Phoenix Five's inner circle were discovering their identities, the group decided to return the Tree so as not to be identified by police. While there was some concern that one or more of the group would eventually be discovered, there was no immediate concern that the ongoing Stanford police investigation would turn up any substantial leads. After the midnight deadline had passed for the return of the mascot, a story in the Daily Cal indicated that police were close to identifying a member of the Phoenix Five. The police based this lead on the fact that they had stopped a car filled with five Cal students on the Stanford campus on the morning of the heist. These students were seen near the Band Shak and indicated that they were looking for a party. The Stanford police indicated that they were retrieving one of the student's photographs from the Department of Motor Vehicles and were confident that this would break the case. However, the Phoenix Five denied that they were stopped at any time on the Stanford campus, and further denied that this investigation had anything to do with the Tree's return.

The events surrounding the Tree's return started with an anonymous phone call to Chancellor Berdahl's office in California Hall on October 30. The caller, a representative of the group, offered to return the Tree in exchange for full amnesty for the Phoenix Five, and this was granted by an out-of-town Berdahl and by the Stanford Dean of Students. Then, at approximately 4 p.m., an older man calling himself "Richard" walked into the chancellor's office with the Tree in a plastic bag. After a brief inspection by Berdahl's executive assistant, Richard left without disclosing his identity. (The Phoenix Five later stated that Richard was in no way related to the group.) The Tree was then driven back to Stanford by a UC Berkeley police detective, who described the victim as "very well-behaved." Upon arrival back at Stanford, the Tree was received by a small welcoming committee of Stanford students before being secured in the Stanford Police Department's evidence room.

Before returning the Tree, the Phoenix Five issued a final letter to media outlets, stating that they were returning the Tree because of the "hostile climate that has been created in recent days." "Gone are the days of healthy rivalry in which students of opposing schools could pull pranks on each other in the name of school spirit," said the letter, indicating the group's disappointment with the harsh reaction the theft received from school officials. The Phoenix Five also stated that they hoped Cal students would show even more school spirit during the upcoming Big Game week, and acknowledged the generous $5,000 ransom donation to charity.

The Phoenix Five (by color) on the steps of Wheeler Hall on the University of California campus

== The aftermath ==
After the Stanford Tree was returned by the Phoenix Five and in the days leading up to the Big Game in 1998, Chancellor Berdahl and members of the group took the opportunity to elaborate on the events that had taken place over the previous few weeks. Chancellor Berdahl, in an interview with the Daily Cal, said that he thought the theft of the Tree was "pretty funny in a sense," but also believed that it could start a dangerous trend, in which both Cal and Stanford continually work to one-up each other. "My concern is that the line between a healthy, friendly rivalry and an unhealthy, violent rivalry is so easily crossed," he said. "I would like for us to have a good rivalry." Berdahl also noted that the Phoenix Five had acted with a "degree of wit and charm," and attempted to clear the misperception that he was discouraging the rivalry by taking a hard-line approach to school pranks.

Two members of the Phoenix Five revealed their identities to the Daily Cal the day before Big Game, including Mr. Orange, the only freshman of the group. In the Big Game edition of the Daily Cal, the Phoenix Five explained their motive behind the Tree heist and subsequent media correspondence: "We wanted to pump up the rivalry, make it a Cal spirit thing and poke fun at Stanford. With a rivalry like this, you've got to live in it, you've got to do something with it, otherwise why bother having it?" A full picture of the Phoenix Five (faces unblurred) appeared in the Daily Cal's 1999 Big Game edition, a year after the heist.

The Tree met its demise during halftime of the Stanford-USC football game (shortly after being returned), when the Cardinal band put it through a tree shredder, stating that it had been "contaminated." A new version of the Tree was then unveiled.

The Phoenix Five's heist of the Stanford Tree is particularly notable, because it stands as the most recent major Big Game prank and marks a turning point in how similar events are viewed by campus officials at Cal, Stanford, and other schools. The Tree was stolen again in 2003, but was returned the next day due to threats of legal action from both the Stanford Band and school administrators. This type of hardline stance will likely continue in the future and is directly traceable to the reaction by officials like Chancellor Berdahl in 1998. The Phoenix Five caper made it more difficult for similar Big Game pranks to succeed and also made it more difficult for these events to be viewed in a humorous and competitive light, fitting for the long-standing rivalry between the University of California and Stanford University.

The Phoenix Five prank has since been considered "[p]erhaps the most tumultuous" event associated with the Big Game in recent memory.

In 2008, the ten-year anniversary of the heist, the Daily Cal named the prank one of the top three in the historic Big Game rivalry.

In 2010, Bleacher Report, in an article ranking college mascot thefts, placed the Phoenix Five heist #1 on its list.

== See also ==
- List of practical joke topics
