= Arthur P. Barnes =

American conductor (1930–2024)

Arthur P. Barnes (March 26, 1930 – February 5, 2024) was an American conductor and professor of music at Stanford University. He directed the Leland Stanford Junior University Marching Band from 1963 to 1997.

== Career ==
After teaching band and music theory at Fresno State University, Barnes came to Stanford in 1963 to get his doctorate in orchestral conducting. He took over as interim director of the Stanford Band (he was named full-time director in 1965), winning over a group of students that had been in a state of anarchy until his arrival with his charts of rock and roll songs, including tunes by The Beatles, Chicago, and The Rolling Stones. His ability to transform popular rock songs into two-minute band pieces soon became the stuff of legend. Under his watch, he devoted most of his attention to directing Stanford's symphony and wind ensembles, while leaving the marching band almost entirely in the hands of the students.

Equally as offbeat as the band members he directed, Barnes filled in for a tuba player in the 1972 Tournament of Roses Parade, winning a $50 bet with the UCLA band director that he couldn't march the five and a half miles with a sousaphone. After playing the tuba for the duration of the entire parade without sheet music, he quipped, "Hell, I didn't need music. I wrote it." The $50 check is still on the wall of the "Band Shak".

Upon his retirement in 1997, he received a proclamation from the six Stanford alumni then in the U.S. Senate (Max Baucus, Jeff Bingaman, Kent Conrad, Dianne Feinstein, Mark Hatfield and Ron Wyden), praising him for his arrangements and his commitment to musical education. A former student manager toasted him at his farewell dinner, saying:

Art Barnes never set out to 'manage' the Stanford Band. He set out to be their leader. He has evolved into being their mentor, their friend, their guide and their buffer from the University administration. And like the best leaders, he surrounded himself with some very bright people and allowed them to do their best.

Despite retiring from Stanford, Barnes continued to direct the Livermore-Amador Symphony, a position he had held since 1964.

In 2000, after three years with only a part-time director, the Stanford Band raised $1.5 million for an endowed chair in Barnes' name, The Dr. Arthur P. Barnes Endowment for the Stanford Director of Bands, to fund a full-time band director to replace Barnes.

Barnes died on February 5, 2024, at the age of 93.

== Arrangements ==
Barnes turned over three hundred popular rock songs into marching band arrangements; these included:

- "All Right Now", the school's de facto fight song,
- a version of "Uncle John's Band" used on the Grateful Dead tribute album Stolen Roses, and
- the Stanford Band's signature arrangement of "The Star-Spangled Banner".

When he joined the band as its director, the musical style was in line with that of other bands, typical military marching fare. Barnes decided to change things and give Stanford a sound that would set it apart from other bands. He scrapped the Native American themed fight songs that had gone along with Stanford's mascot, the Indian, and sought a new fight song.

Barnes had a tough time convincing the students that a song from British band Free could represent the university, but to this day, students and alumni still jump during "All Right Now", the school's de facto fight song. While "Come Join The Band" has been the official fight song since long before Stanford had a scatter band, the band plays "All Right Now" before every game, after every touchdown or field goal, after every Stanford win (when they play their "Victory Mix"), and as the last song of any set that they perform.
