= Livermore-Amador Symphony =

Orchestra in California, U.S.

- Orchestra
- Founded: 1963
- Location: Tri-Valley, San Francisco Bay Area, California, U.S.
- Concert hall: Bankhead Theater, Livermore Valley Performing Arts Center
- Principal conductor: Arthur P. Barnes
- Concertmaster: Kristina Anderson
- Website: livermoreamadorsymphony.org

The Livermore-Amador Symphony is a local symphony orchestra composed of musicians from the Tri-Valley in the San Francisco Bay Area, United States.

== History and operations ==
The symphony was established in 1963, drawing mainly from the amateur musicians in Livermore, California, and surrounding cities. Four main concerts are played each season, which runs from September to May, as well as a fundraising "Pops" concert series each fall. The four main concerts are held in the Bankhead Theater of the Livermore Valley Performing Arts Center. The repertoire is classical music ranging from Baroque to modern.

The 2010–2011 season was conducted by Arthur P. Barnes, a professor emeritus at Stanford University, who has conducted the orchestra since 1964 when he was a doctoral student at Stanford. The concertmaster is Kristina Anderson. Barnes, Anderson, and the principal cellist are the only paid regular players; the rest are volunteers.

The symphony is a member of the Association of California Symphony Orchestras and the League of American Orchestras. Education and outreach have long been concerns of the symphony, and a committee was appointed in 1965 to establish an award for a musician graduating from a local high school. This tradition has continued with a few memorial awards added. The Symphony Association has sponsored a yearly competition for young musicians which has discovered some talented young people.

== See also ==
- List of symphony orchestras in the United States
- Music of California
