= Stanford Tree =

Unofficial mascot of Stanford University

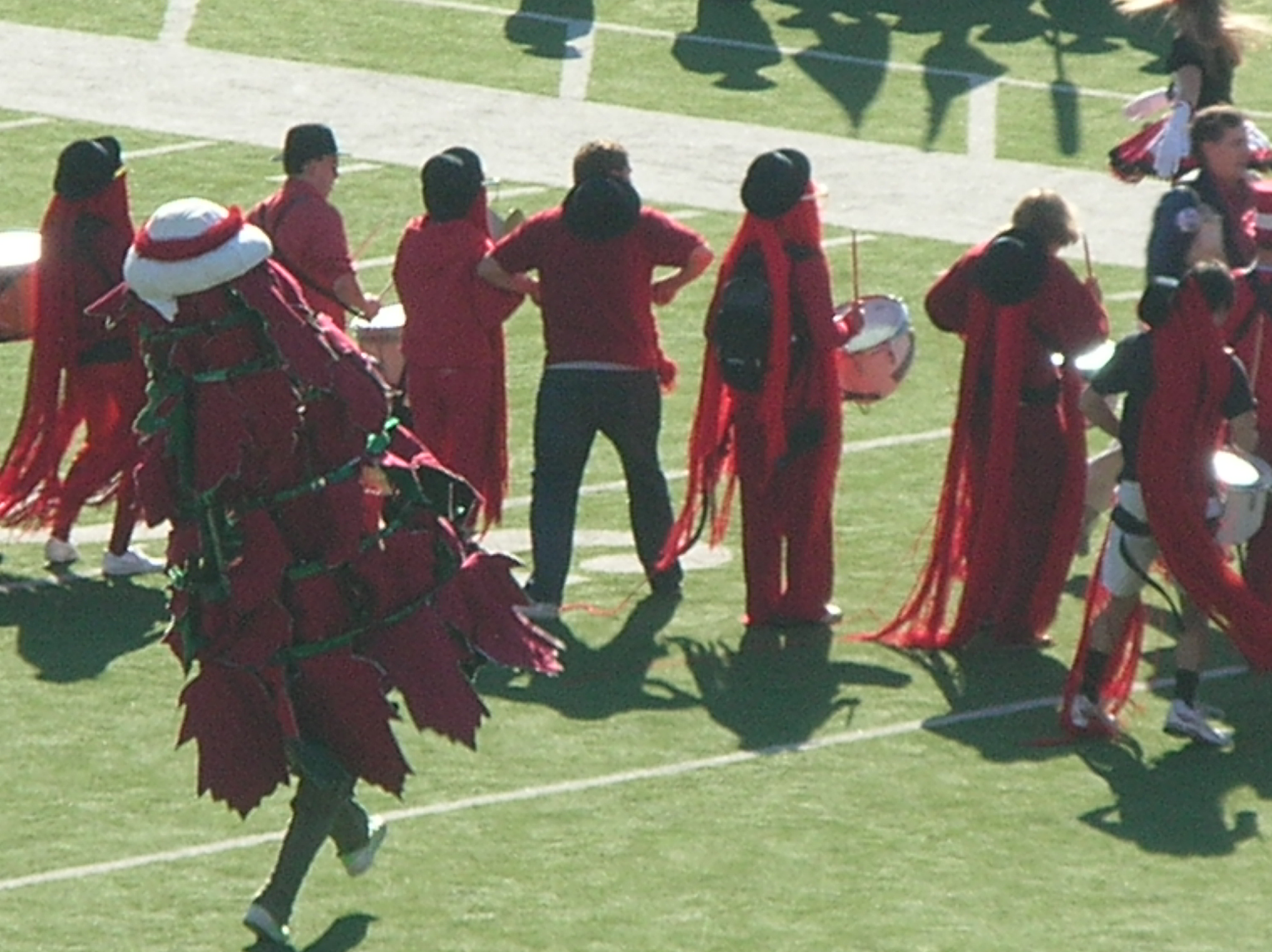
- The Tree (left) at the 2008 Big Game
- University: Stanford University
- Conference: ACC
- Description: Evergreen tree
- First seen: 1975

The Stanford Tree is a sequoia and the Stanford Band's mascot and the unofficial mascot of Stanford University. Stanford's team name is "Cardinal", referring to the vivid Stanford Cardinal Red color (not the common songbird as at several other schools), and the university does not have an official mascot. The Tree, in various versions, has been called one of America's most bizarre and controversial college mascots. The tree regularly appears at the top of Internet "worst mascot" lists but has also appeared on at least one list of top mascots.

== History ==
The Tree is a member of the Leland Stanford Junior University Marching Band (LSJUMB) and appears at football games, basketball games, and other events where the band performs. The "Tree" is representative of El Palo Alto, the tree which appears on both the official seal of the University and the municipal seal of Palo Alto, Stanford's nearby city.

From 1930 to 1972, Stanford's sports teams had been known as the Indians and during the period from 1951 to 1972, Prince Lightfoot (portrayed by Timm Williams, a member of the Yurok tribe) was the official mascot. But in 1972, Native American students and staff members successfully lobbied University President Richard Lyman to abolish the "Indian" name along with what they had come to perceive as an offensive and demeaning mascot. Stanford's teams unofficially reverted to using the name "Cardinal", the color which represented the school before 1930.

From 1972 to 1981, Stanford’s official nickname was the Cardinal, but, during this time, there was debate among students and administrators concerning what the mascot and team name should be. A 1972 student referendum on the issue was in favor of restoring the Indian, while a second 1975 referendum was against. The 1975 vote included new suggestions, many alluding to the industry of the school's founder, railroad tycoon Leland Stanford: the Robber Barons, the Sequoias, the Trees, the Cardinals, the Railroaders, the Spikes, and the Huns. The Robber Barons won, but the university's administration refused to implement the vote. In 1978, 225 varsity athletes started a petition for the mascot to be the griffin, but that campaign also failed. Finally, in 1981, Donald Kennedy, the president of Stanford, declared that all Stanford athletic teams would be represented exclusively by the color cardinal.

However, in 1975, the band had performed a series of halftime shows which facetiously suggested several other new mascot candidates it considered particularly appropriate for Stanford including the Steaming Manhole, the French Fry, and the Tree. The Tree ended up receiving so much positive attention that the band decided to make it a permanent fixture, and the Tree came to be embraced by the Stanford community at large.

The original Tree costume was conceived and constructed by Christine Hutson. When she left Stanford, she passed along the costume and the role of the Tree to a conga drum player in the band, Robert David Siegel.

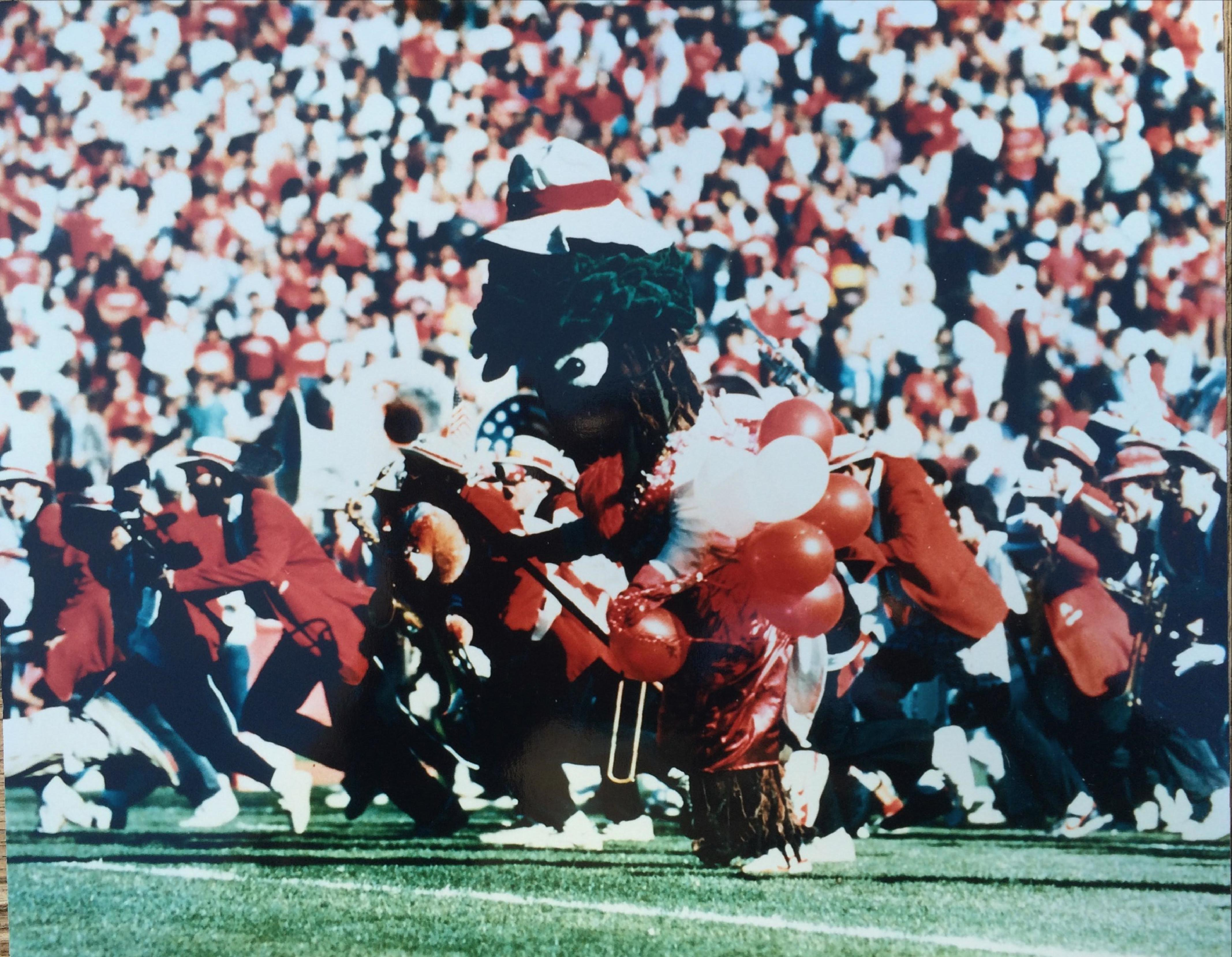
The Tree at the Big Game, 1987

At the 1987 Big Game, Stanford Tree Paul Kelly was attacked by several Cal students who ran onto the field during the halftime show. Barely escaping, Kelly led them to the drum section where all three Berkeley students were tackled.

The staffers, many still in their grounds-crew uniforms, sit in neat rows, attentive if slightly bemused. Then the trombones kick in, and the audience is blasted back in its chairs like jet pilots. Before the first song is over, a few heads are starting to bob and feet are moving to the rhythm, but all eyes are on The Band's bizarre mascot. The Tree, a nine-foot pillar of bark and foliage–with legs and a maniacal smile–looks like a character from some low rent Disneyland. He ricochets around the stage and into the audience with alarming abandon, rarely quite vertical but never entirely horizontal.

— Band on the Run, Rolling Stone, Issue 509, September 24, 1987

Due to the heightened visibility of the Stanford Tree, physical altercations with Cal students became commonplace and part of the assignment. At the annual Battle of the Bands at University of California, Davis, Kelly left the Tree costume on the bus after a long day in the sun and Cal students broke into the bus and stole the costume. A week later the band received a ransom note offering the Tree in exchange for Oski the Bear (which had been stolen from the UCB Student Union the previous year). The band did not think much of the trade and a tradition of making a new costume was begun. Every year since then, the band and their many admirers now expect the Tree to be reinvented every fall. With more exposure, the decision about who would become Tree became more rigorous and the band had to adopt a more formal selection process. Today's Tree candidate must go through "grueling and humiliating physical and mental challenges" to demonstrate sufficient chutzpah to be the Tree. During "Tree Week," candidates have been known to perform outrageous, unwise, and often dangerous stunts in order to impress the Tree selection committee, so much so that the university has felt the need to prohibit certain types of audition activities over the years.

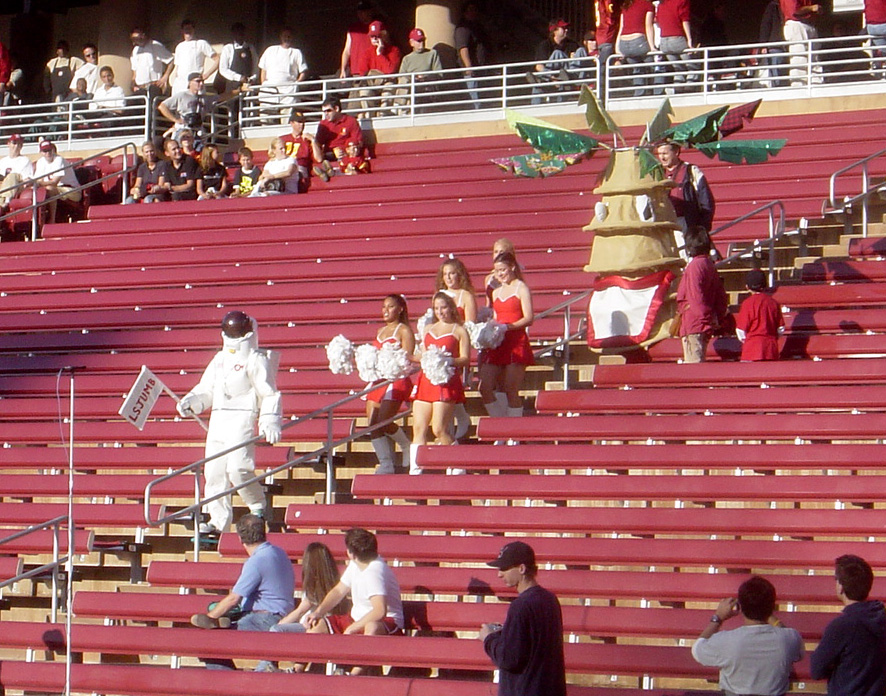
The Stanford Tree entering Stanford Stadium in November 2006

The Tree's costume, which is created anew each year by the incumbent Tree, is a prominent target for pranksters from rival schools, in particular from Stanford's Bay Area nemesis, the University of California, Berkeley (Cal). The tendency for the Tree to come to harm at the hands of Cal fans was showcased in the run-up to the 1998 Big Game. An anonymous coterie of fraternity brothers from Cal known as the Phoenix Five stole the costume and held it "hostage" for two weeks until it was turned in to the UC Berkeley chancellor's office and returned to Stanford by the UC Police.

In 1996 two Cal students emerged shirtless from the stands at Memorial Stadium at the Big Game during halftime and tackled the tree, breaking branches and eliciting cheers from the Cal alumni prior to being handcuffed and led away. The most recent theft of the Tree was during the 2012 basketball game against Cal, when a member of the Cal band entered LSJUMB's bus and removed the mascot. Older bandsmen quickly sent the Tree outfit back that evening and no charges were pressed.

Violence and absurd levels of prankery have been a two-way street between Cal and Stanford. A few years earlier, during an ESPN-televised timeout during a February 1995 basketball game at Maples Pavilion, the Stanford Tree and Cal's mascot Oski got into a fistfight in front of the Stanford student section. The Oski costume's headpiece was forcefully removed by the Tree during the scuffle, an act of special significance because Cal has taken great pains to keep the identities of its Oski costume wearers secret since the 1940s.

A spate of troubles brought the Tree even more notoriety in college sports circles. In February 2006, then-Tree Erin Lashnits was suspended until the end of her term as the Tree after her blood-alcohol level was found to be 0.157 (almost twice the legal driving limit in California) during a men's basketball game between Stanford and Cal. UC Berkeley police observed her drinking from a flask during the game and cited her for public drunkenness after she failed a breathalyzer test. In August 2006, the NCAA fined Stanford University for what it termed "multiple violations of tournament policies" after an on-court altercation involving Tree mascot Tommy Leep and tournament officials as the Stanford women's basketball team participated in the second round of the NCAA Tournament in Denver. The Tree was then banned from the 2007 Women's Tournament.

The Tree was also featured in a few ESPN "This is SportsCenter" commercials. One example was when Atlanta Braves right fielder Jason Heyward was talking about how baseball bats were made when the Tree, in the background, fell over. Another example was when golfer Bubba Watson and his caddie were "playing through" the Tree, which was referred to as an obstacle. In 2022, the 44th Stanford Tree, Jordan Zietz was suspended from his role for holding a sign reading "Stanford Hates Fun" with the Arizona State mascot. The "Stanford Hates Fun" sign was part of a student backlash against the perceived curtailing by the university of student activities, which some students started calling a "War on Fun". The previous Tree, Grayson Armour, said that he would take over as mascot until Zietz returned.

== List of Trees ==
Years	Tree
1975–1977	Chris Hutson
1977–1978	Robert David Siegel
1978–1980	Meredith Fondahl
1980–1981	Judy Mischel
1981–1982	Eliza Pond
1982 football season	Annelies Kelly
1983–1984	Pat Leckman
1984–1985	Mardi Dier
1985–1986	Mary Boyce
1986–1987	Carole Sams Hoemeke
1987–1988	Paul Brendan Kelly III
1988–1989	William Washington Thomas III
1989–1990	Gil Blank
1990–1991	Todd David
1991–1992	Pete Huyck
1992–1993	Greg Siegel
1993–1994	Charles Goodan
1994–1995	Ari Benjamin Mervis
1995–1996	Christopher Jeffrey Bonzon
1996–1997	Christopher Anselmo Cary
1997–1998	Matthew James Merrill
1998–1999	Christopher Matthew Henderson
1999–2000	Evan Fletcher Meagher
2000–2001	Alexandra Mary Newell
2001–2002	Charles Monroe Armstrong
2002–2003	Andrew Daniel Parker
2003–2004	William Robert Rothacker, Jr.
2004–2005	Daniel Isaac Salier-Hellendag
2005–2006	Erin Wright Lashnits
2006–2007	Thomas Elwood Leep
2007–2008	John Henrique Whipple
2008–2009	Patrick Jonathan Fortune (Patchez)
2009–2010	Jonathan Patrick Strange (Shü-Fry)
2010–2011	Benjamin Cortes Fernando de la Guerra (Bollox)
2011–2012	Michael Benjamin Samuels
2012–2013	Nicoletta von Heidegger (Pacman)
2013–2014	Calvin Studebaker
2014–2015	William Funk
2015–2016	Sarah Young
2016–2017	Sam Weyen
2017–2018	Tyler Clark
2018–2019	Dahkota Brown
2019–2020	Caroline Kushel
2020–2022	Grayson Armour
2022–2023	Jordan Zietz
2023–2024	Emily Rodriguez
2024–2025	Ruby Marie Coulson
2025–2026	Sonnet Loki Van Doren
