= Come Join the Band =

Fight song of Stanford University

"Come Join the Band" is the official fight song of Stanford University. The lyrics were written in 1907 by screenwriter and playwright Aurania Rouverol, then a student at Stanford, and are set to the trio from Robert Browne Hall's New Colonial March. Although "Come Join the Band" remains Stanford's official fight song, the Stanford Band nowadays plays "All Right Now" as their usual fight song at football games.

== Recordings ==
"Come Join The Band" has been recorded several times, and has been featured on at least four albums:

- Ultrasound (1999), by the Leland Stanford Junior University Marching Band (LSJUMB)
- Up Toward Mountains Higher (1999), by the Stanford Fleet Street Singers
- This Is Why We Can't Have Nice Things (2003), by the Stanford Band
- The One, The Only (2008), by the Stanford Band

== Related songs ==
Other Stanford University fight songs include:

- "When Stanford Begins to Score," by W. A. Irwin (1899)
- "Victory Song," by G. H. Yost (1900)
- "Just Because They Hit That Line So Hard," by M. A. Thomas Jr. (1904)
- "The Cardinal Song," by Alice Kimball (1904)
- "Sons of the Stanford Red," by William Achi (1911) and Geoffrey F. Morgan (1909)
- "The Cardinal Is Waving," by William G. Paul (1917)
