= Stanford Band =

Marching band of Stanford University

Leland Stanford Junior University Marching Band
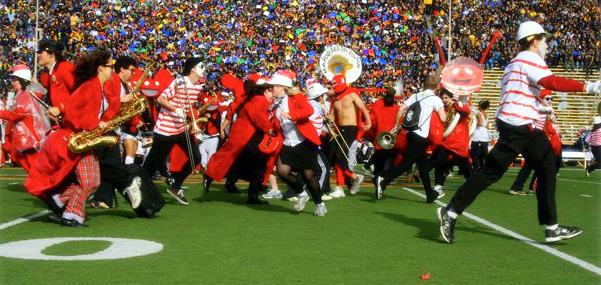
- LSJUMB scattering at Big Game 2010 at California (Each section of the LSJUMB wears a different costume at the Big Game.)
- School: Stanford University
- Location: Stanford, California
- Conference: Atlantic Coast Conference
- Founded: 1893
- Members: 20–400 (depending on the day)
- Fight song: "Come Join the Band" and "All Right Now"
- Website: lsjumb.stanford.edu

The Leland Stanford Junior University Marching Band (LSJUMB) is the student marching band representing Stanford University and its athletic teams. Billing itself as "The World's Largest Rock and Roll Band," the Stanford Band performs at sporting events, student activities, and other functions. The Stanford Tree is the band's mascot.

== History ==
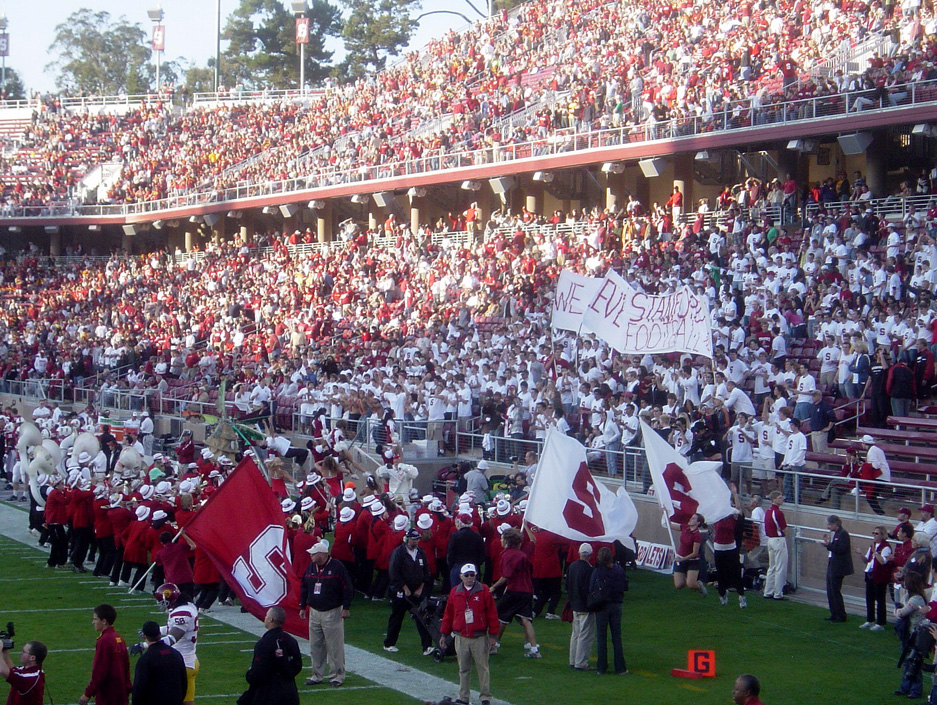
LSJUMB rallying fans at Stanford Stadium.

The LSJUMB was formed in 1893. However, its modern era began in 1963 with the hiring of Arthur P. Barnes as interim director (he got the full-time post two years later). Previous director Julius Shuchat had been very popular, and his ouster caused several members to go on strike. However, according to band lore, Barnes immediately won the band's loyalty by ceding any meaningful control over it. As a result, the band is almost entirely student-run.

In 1972, the Band went from an all-male band to co-ed.

The band and its new director also clicked over his arrangement of "The Star-Spangled Banner," which featured the striking effect of a single trumpet playing the first half of the song, joined later by soft woodwinds and tuba, and finally bringing the full power of the brass only in the final verse. When it was played at the "Big Game" against California, just eight days after the assassination of President John F. Kennedy, Barnes said, "I've never heard such a loud silence."

Empowered, the student-led band threw away the traditional marching music and military-style uniforms, eventually settling for a mostly rock and roll repertoire and a simplified uniform consisting of a white fishing hat with red trim (and as many buttons as will fit), red blazer, black pants, and "the ugliest tie you can get your hands on." In the springtime and at non-athletic events, band members appear at performances (and sometimes even at rehearsals) wearing "rally" attire, which can range from swim suits to Halloween costumes to furniture and pets, always displaying their freedom from the usual rules of fashion. Its Badonkadonk Land Cruiser, resembling a vehicle from the 1983 Star Wars movie Return of the Jedi, is used as a band-support vehicle.

== Songs and shows ==
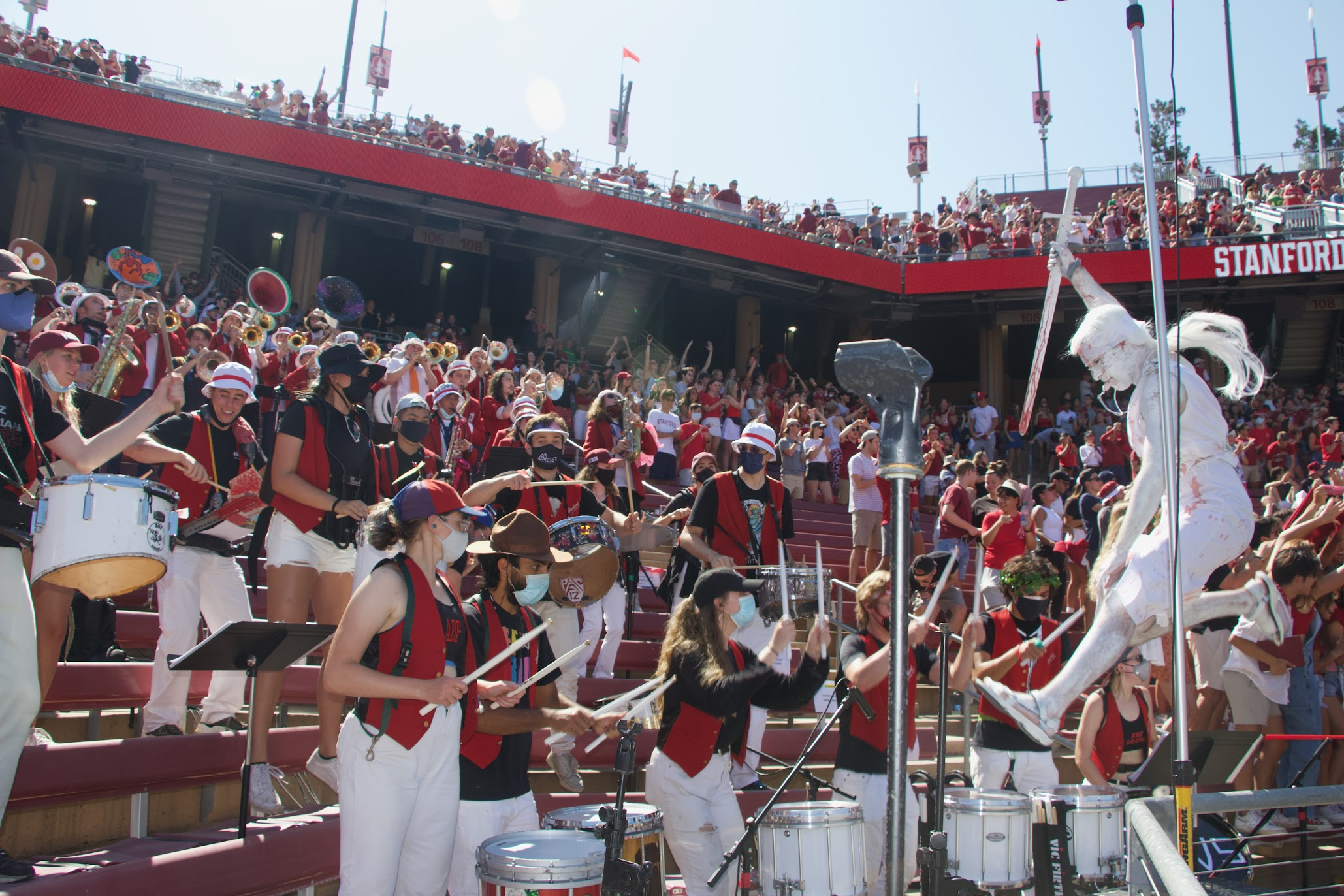
LSJUMB performing in the stands at Stanford Stadium.

The band's repertoire is heavy on classic rock of the 1970s, particularly songs by Tower of Power, Santana, and The Who. In the 1990s, more modern music was introduced, including songs by Green Day and The Offspring. For many years, it has billed itself as "The World's Largest Rock 'n Roll Band."

The de facto fight song is "All Right Now," originally performed by Free. Another frequently played song in their repertoire is "White Punks on Dope", originally by The Tubes. The band prides itself on its vast song selection, never playing the same song twice in one day (except for "All Right Now"). It has a library of over 1,000 songs at its disposal, 69 of which are in active rotation.

One of the first collegiate marching bands to record and release their music, the band has produced thirteen albums since 1967. Arrangements focus on the loudest brass instruments—trumpets, mellophones, and trombones—and percussion—one bass drum (called the Axis o' Rhythm), snare drums, and single tenor drums. This led a Rolling Stone writer to note in 1987, "It's hard for anyone raised on rock to imagine that a band could sound this loud without thousands of watts of amplification."

Many traditional band instruments like bells and glockenspiels are altogether absent. Traditional "marching" is also missing, as the band "scatters" from one formation to the next. The halftime field shows feature formations that are silly or suggestive shapes, as well as words. A team of Stanford students write a script for the halftime show, delivered over the public address system, which provides a basic explanation for the band's formations.

== Stunts and incidents ==
The LSJUMB's behavior has made them notorious. They have been criticized and disciplined for their actions on several occasions, and according to Peter Sagal of NPR in 2006, the LSJUMB is "the only university marching band...repeatedly fined and banned by the NCAA".

- In 1970 on September 12 at the Stanford-Arkansas football game, the band dropped their pants during the nationally televised halftime show.
- In the 1970s, one halftime show lampooned California student Patty Hearst's kidnapping with a formation called the Hearst Burger — two buns and no patty.
- The LSJUMB has been banned from Disneyland due to their antics, such as taking over the microphone on the Storybook Land Canal boats, while visiting in Anaheim for the 1972 Rose Bowl. Disneyland officials were upset with the "true story" behind the ride. Additionally the Rose Bowl committee still requires advance review if the band marches in the parade due to their plan to ride golf carts instead of marching in 1971 and their having kegs of beer on a red wagon and passing out drinks to the crowd. The band also spelled out the initials SMUT (Stanford Marching Unit Thinkers – an official acronym for the group of band members who conceive the show or sexually explicit material) on the field before the 1972 Rose Bowl.
- In 1986, the university suspended the band from traveling to the UCLA football game scheduled on November 8, 1986, after incidents in previous games that season. First, on October 11, 1986, an infamous incident of public urination happened following the home football game against the Washington Huskies. Second, during the halftime show of the home USC game on October 25, 1986, the band spelled out "NO BALLZ" and formed male genitalia. Finally, they performed an anagram show and spelled out an anagram of a four-letter word ("NCUT"). After the UCLA game suspension was served, the band appeared at the Cal game wearing angel halos in an attempt to apologize and get invited to travel with the football team to a bowl game. The band attended the Gator Bowl that year, amid very close scrutiny.
- In 1989, before an away game against USC, the USC Trojan Marching Band toilet-papered the Stanford Tree mascot in the Coliseum tunnel before the pre-game show, resulting in a free-for-all between members of both bands and the mascot that had to be broken up by the referees.
- In 1990, Stanford suspended the band for a single game after their halftime show at the University of Oregon criticized the logging of the spotted owl's habitats in the northwest United States. The band used formations in the shape of a chainsaw and in the shape of the word OWL changing to AWOL. Governor Neil Goldschmidt (a member of the Oregon Democratic Party) issued a decree that the band not return to Oregon for several years; the band did not return until 2001. After the spotted owl incident, all halftime shows were reviewed and approved by Stanford's Athletic Department.
- In 1991, the University of Notre Dame banned the LSJUMB from visiting its campus after a halftime show at Stanford in which drum major Eric Selvik dressed as a nun and conducted the band using a wooden cross as a baton. (During the pregame show and first half of the game, the drum major had been dressed as an Orthodox Jew, where the wooden cross was part of a menorah-like baton.) After the halftime show, a female Notre Dame fan ran onto the field, approached from behind the unsuspecting Selvik, and forcibly ripped the nun habit off of his head. Selvik pursued and regained his habit from the attacker, who in the scuffle for the habit told the drum major he was "going to hell for this."
- In 1992, the LSJUMB was denied entry to Disneyland after being invited there to play in connection with the Pigskin Classic III, which pitted Stanford against Texas A&M.
- In 1992, Stanford's athletic department pressured the LSJUMB to fire its announcer after one used the phrase "No chuppah, no schtuppa" at a San Jose State University game halftime show.
- In 1994, the band was disciplined after nineteen members skipped a field rehearsal in Los Angeles to play outside the Los Angeles County Superior Courthouse during jury selection for the O. J. Simpson murder trial. The band's song selection included an arrangement of The Zombies' "She's Not There." Defense lawyer Robert Shapiro described the incident to the media as "a new low in tasteless behavior." Later that year, during the halftime show of the football game against USC (where Simpson had played football and won the 1968 Heisman Trophy), band members drove a white Ford Bronco with bloody handprints around the Stanford Stadium track, an obvious allusion to the low-speed chase in which police followed a white Bronco carrying Simpson around the Los Angeles area.
- In 1997, the band was again disciplined for shows lampooning Catholicism and the Irish at a game against Notre Dame. The band put on a show entitled "These Irish, Why Must they Fight?" Besides the mocking supposedly stereotypical Irish-Catholic behavior, there was a Riverdance formation, and a Great Famine joke, drawing criticism for its "tasteless" portrayal of Catholics. Stanford President Gerhard Casper subsequently apologized for the band's behavior; the band and the athletic director also apologized. Subsequently, the band was prohibited from playing at games against Notre Dame for two years.
- In 1999, when UCLA football players were caught in an ADA-accessible parking scandal, the band formed a disability-accessible symbol on the field, and wheeled the Stanford Tree in on a wheelchair.
- In 2002 and 2006, the band was sanctioned for off-the-field behavior, including violations of the university alcohol policy.
- In 2004, the band drew national attention and Mormon ire for joking about polygamy during a game against Brigham Young University. The Dollies appeared in wedding veils with the band manager of the time kneeling and "proposing" to each in turn as the announcer referred to marriage as "the sacred bond that exists between a man and a woman... and a woman... and a woman... and a woman... and a woman."
- The band's hijinks were given a wider audience when they became the subject of Alan Alda's appearance on the "Not My Job" segment on NPR's Wait Wait... Don't Tell Me! on September 9, 2006.
- In 2006, the band was suspended by Stanford administrators when their former "Band Shak" was vandalized. After moving into a new $2.8 million facility, the previous Shak, a trailer that served as a temporary home for the band, was found with broken windows and profanities spray painted on the walls. Administrators believed members of the band were responsible for the damage, as the band had believed the trailer was to be demolished the next day. The Band was placed on a provisional status for several months, and had many privileges taken away for the duration of the suspension, including the right to be freely student-run. The band was also barred from performing at halftime of the 2006 Big Game as a result. However, the university stated that November they would not press vandalism charges. In March 2007, the university exonerated the individual Band members involved in the incident. It also charged the band $8,000 for damages (though it initially estimated damages of $50,000). In July 2007, the band was fully reinstated, and then two months later, the band's alcohol probation was also lifted.
- In 2009, the band performed a field show at USC that openly criticized USC alum & Girls Gone Wild founder Joe Francis, drawing ire from fans with lines like, "USC can't take all of the credit for the successes of its students. After all, it takes a special kind of man to be wanted for sexual harassment, drug trafficking, tax evasion, prostitution, child abuse and disruptive flatulence. But that's just the kind of captain of industry Joe Francis is."
- Organizers of the 2011 Orange Bowl supposedly banned the band from performing their halftime show upon announcement of its theme: "Recent Events in the Pro Sports World in Miami"; this was done out of concern of hurting the feelings of athletes such as LeBron James, who had controversially joined the Miami Heat the previous summer. This was later revealed to be a misinterpretation as the game reserved halftime for the Goo Goo Dolls and the bands from both universities were limited to a pre game show.
- In 2015, following a joint investigation by Stanford's Organization Conduct Board (OCB) and Title IX Office, it was announced that the band would be prohibited from performing at away athletic events for one year and would be required to adopt a number of reforms. The university initiated the joint inquiry after learning of concerns regarding several band events, including off-campus trips, that the band held for its members between 2012 and 2015. The investigation found that, on several occasions, the band violated university policies regarding alcohol, controlled substances, hazing and/or sexual harassment. Violations included a tradition in which a band member was given an alcoholic concoction intended to make that individual vomit publicly; an annual trip in which some band members used illegal substances; and a band selection process in which individuals were asked a number of inappropriate questions on sexual matters.
- At halftime of the 2016 Rose Bowl Game, the band performed a show that included the jingle from the Farmersonly.com dating website, formations that included a corn maze and a sad farmer, and an enactment of "cow tipping". The performance was taken by many as insulting farmers, the state of Iowa, and the University of Iowa (Stanford's opponent in the game). However, Stanford itself is also commonly nicknamed "The Farm". The band was booed by Iowa fans, and the incident sparked outrage on social media. A transcript of the field show can be found on the band's Facebook page.
- In December 2016, a Stanford Organizational Conduct Board panel found the band responsible for new violations of campus alcohol policy, the alcohol suspension and the travel ban. The OCB panel found "a systemic cultural problem" in the band organization and concluded that "the outstanding issues have not been taken seriously by the band or its leadership and that nothing more will be accomplished without extreme consequences." The band was required to stop all activities and lose its status as a registered student group. The suspension was expected to last through the 2016–2017 school year, but the band successfully appealed the decision to Provost John Etchemendy. The appeal placed the band on a "provisional status" through the end of the 2016–2017 school year.
- At halftime of the 2017 Alamo Bowl, the band performed a routine that appeared to mock various aspects of the state of Texas, including Whataburger. Fans in attendance at the game booed the routine.
- In July 2020, two anonymous submissions to the popular student-run Instagram page 'Stanford Missed Connections' highlighted that the band had consistently failed to address an alleged culture of sexual misconduct. The posts detailed one student's attempt at reporting a case of misconduct, and accused the LSJUMB of a long history of "silencing survivors". Both anecdotes were removed from the page almost immediately, which was revealed to have been done at the request of then-band manager Caroline Bamberger. Band director Russ Gavin also commented that the culture of the LSJUMB had historically taught students to "fear hurting the organization", which discouraged students from coming forward with allegations of sexual misconduct and assault.
- At halftime of the 2022 game against Arizona State, the Stanford Tree had a sign stating 'STANFORD HATES FUN'. The student who acts as the tree mascot was suspended. Later that day, a halftime show by the University of California Marching Band’s halftime show made fun of this stunt.
- In November 2022, the halftime show at the Stanford–BYU game featured a mock lesbian wedding accompanied by phrases from LDS temple ceremonies and theology, where two LSJUMB members were shown kissing. After blowback from BYU, Stanford Athletics issued a statement the following Monday: "The Leland Stanford Junior University Marching Band (LSJUMB) has a long history of lighthearted and satirical halftime performances. Unfortunately, some of the language that was used in Saturday’s halftime show did not reflect Stanford University’s values of religious freedom and diversity, inclusion and belonging. The LSJUMB deeply regrets that this performance caused offense to spectators, and the halftime performance review and approval process is being adjusted to ensure that issues like this do not occur again."

=== The Play ===
The Band's most infamous and controversial moment, however, had nothing to do with its irreverence. In the final four seconds of the 1982 Big Game against the University of California, Berkeley (Cal), band members (as well as players from Stanford) ran out onto the field, thinking the game was over after Stanford players appeared to have tackled ball-carrier Dwight Garner. Garner managed to lateral it to another player, and they continued to lateral back and forth, with Cal's Kevin Moen dodging through the band for a winning touchdown, which he ended by running over LSJUMB trombone player Gary Tyrrell in the end zone. "The Play" is celebrated by Cal fans and inspires the ire of many Stanford fans. To this day, it remains one of the most famous and controversial plays in American football history.

In 2002, during the Big Game halftime show, the LSJUMB performed a humorous re-enactment of The Play. Special emphasis was placed on the allegation that California player Garner's knee touched the ground before his lateral; all band members performing the re-enactment froze in place at this stage, and a single member, carrying a large yellow arrow, ran out and repeatedly pointed at the "down" Garner. Officials at the time did not call Garner down and though no instant replay rule was in effect at the time, game tape appears inconclusive.

To this day the position of Band Manager is conferred from one generation to the next with four seconds left in the Big Game in commemoration of The Play.

== The Dollies ==
The Dollies, a five-member female dance group, and the Stanford Tree, the university's de facto mascot (the de jure mascot is the color cardinal), operate under the band's aegis. The Dollies were incorporated into the Band in 1953 per 1954–56 band manager Donald Wells. The Dollies appear at all sporting events and school/community rallies with the Stanford Band and Tree.

The Dollies are a dance group, rather than cheerleaders in the typical sense. They are a separate entity from the Stanford Cheer team. Dollies choreograph their own routines, hold their own practices, and design their own dresses and costumes. Traditional dress colors are white for the spring, red for the fall, and cardinal for the winter. The Dollies are numbered 1–5 in order of height (shortest to tallest).

Dollies serve one-year terms, and each year five new dancers are chosen by previous Dollies and the band. Each year's new Dollie cadre is revealed at the annual "Dollie Splash," where the Dollies give their debut performance in the spring for the public followed by a dunking in the Stanford Claw.

The most recent Dollies have been:

- 2026–2027 Dollies: Shelley Guo, Lily Poon, Colette Chang, Ani Yordanova, Logan Christopher
- 2025–2026 Dollies: Samantha Lau, Makyla Cervantes, Talon Watchman, Rosalyn Tu, Corinne Thomas
- 2024–2025 Dollies: Ariana Lee, Alice Finklestein, Yujen Lin, Janae Lindsay, Abigail Lee
- 2023–2024 Dollies: Cheryl Tolomeo, Rachel "Mack" Jones, Cordelia Li, Eva Geierstanger, Ava Tiffany
- 2022–2023 Dollies: Karina Chen, Sophia Chun, Emma Wang, Alyssa Frederick, Chuyi Zhang
- 2020–2022 Dollies: Amisha Iyer, Annabelle Wang, Yishu Chen, Vivian Urness, Audrey Ward
- 2019–2020 Dollies: Charlotte Brewer, Jasmine Rodriguez, Tiffany Liu, Julia Raven, Savannah Payne
- 2018–2019 Dollies: Justine Kaneda, Erica Olsen, Ellie Toler, Sabrina Medler, Sarah Ludington
- 2017–2018 Dollies: Grace Dong, Audrey Elliott, Samantha Loui, Lauren Clark, Sydney Maly
- 2016–2017 Dollies: Janelle Kaneda, Arianna Tapia, Taylor Butze, Jolena Ma, Emily O'Neal
- 2015–2016 Dollies: Alida Ratteray, Claudia Aber, Chloe Koseff, Shelby Crants, Dalia Szafer
- 2014–2015 Dollies: Erika Nguyen, Aubriana Menendez, Martha Collins, Shelby Mynhier, Jordan Huelskamp
- 2013–2014 Dollies: Lindsay Fiorentino, Heather Glenny, Leigh Kinney, Courtney Yang, Amelia Chen
- 2012–2013 Dollies: Tayna Gonzalez, Emily Giglio, Dafna Szafer, Amber Quiñones, Christine Chung
- 2011–2012 Dollies: Paula Obler, Jessica Jin, Clare Bailey, Jessica Savoie, Danna Seligman
- 2010–2011 Dollies: Alina Pimentel, CC Chiu, Sarah Chang, Melissa Schwarz, Alex Nana-Sinkam
- 2009–2010 Dollies: Shea Ritchie, Paula Markey, Nia Minor, Kim Souza, Elise Birkhofer
- 2008–2009 Dollies: Jennifer Lee, Ali Romer, Taylor Phillips, Sydney Gulbronson, Taylor Thibodeaux
- 2007–2008 Dollies: Kelly Cahill, Sam Halladay, Alex Danto, Dana Ryan, Claire Robbins

== Albums of the LSJUMB ==
- Funny On Occasion, Embarrassing On Average (2013)
- The One, The Only (2008)
- This Is Why We Can't Have Nice Things (2003)
- Ultrasound (1999)
- The Winds of Freedom Blow (Greatest Hits 1970–1998) (1998)
- Mirth Control (1995)
- The Band Is Not Helping (1991)
- Contraband (1987)
- Block S (1982)
- Starting Salary: $22,275.00 (1979)
- The Incomparables (1977)
- The Incomparable Leland Stanford Junior University Marching Band (1974)
- The Incomparable Leland Stanford Junior University Marching Band (1972)
- The Incomparable Leland Stanford Junior University Marching Band (1970)
