= United States men's Olympic water polo team statistics (medalists) =

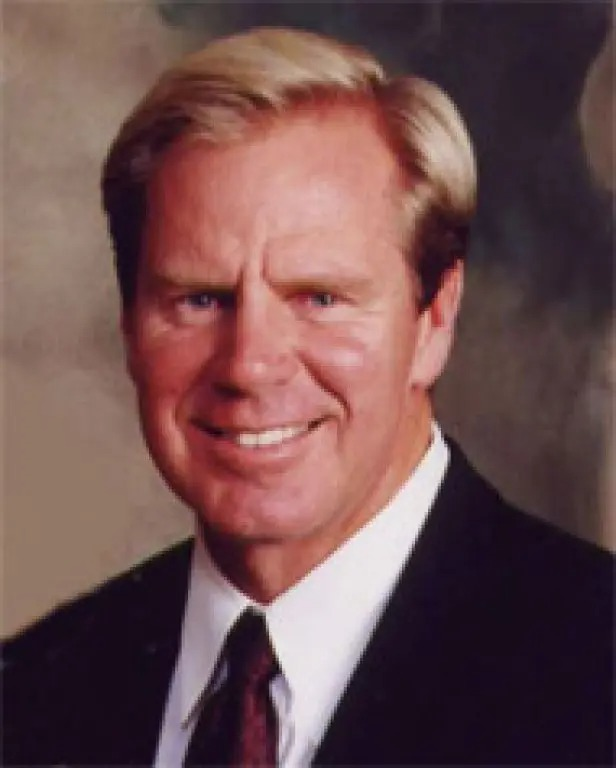
Terry Schroeder is the first and only American (man or woman) to have won medals in the Olympic water polo tournaments both as a player and as a head coach.

This article contains lists of medalists for the United States men's national water polo team at the Summer Olympics, and is part of the United States men's Olympic water polo team statistics series. The lists are updated as of October 5, 2019.

== Abbreviations ==
No.	Cap number	Rk	Rank	Ref	Reference
H	Handedness	L	Left-handed	R	Right-handed
Pos	Playing position	FP	Field player	GK	Goalkeeper
CB	Center back (2-meter defense)	CF	Center forward (2-meter offense)	D	Driver (attacker)
U	Utility (except goalkeeper)				

== Water polo Olympic medalists ==
=== Players ===
The following table is pre-sorted by number of Olympic medals (in descending order), type of the Olympic medal (in descending order), date of receiving an Olympic medal (in ascending order), name of the person (in ascending order), respectively.

Eighty-seven athletes have won Olympic medals in water polo. Six of them have each won two Olympic medals. Aside from Wally O'Connor, who won medals before World War II, all were members of the men's national team that won consecutive silver medals in 1984 and 1988.

Rk	Name	Pos	H	Height	Games as player	Medals				Ref
Rk	Name	Pos	H	Height	Games as player	G	S	B	T	Ref
1	Jody Campbell	CF		6 ft 2.5 in (1.89 m)	1984 (silver) , 1988 (silver)	0	2	0	2	
1	Peter Campbell	CF/U		6 ft 3.5 in (1.92 m)	1984 (silver) , 1988 (silver)	0	2	0	2	
1	Kevin Robertson	D	L	5 ft 8.5 in (1.74 m)	1984 (silver) , 1988 (silver)	0	2	0	2	
1	Terry Schroeder	CF		6 ft 2.5 in (1.89 m)	1984 (silver) , 1988 (silver) , 1992	0	2	0	2	
1	Craig Wilson	GK		6 ft 4.5 in (1.94 m)	1984 (silver) , 1988 (silver) , 1992	0	2	0	2	
6	Wally O'Connor	FP			1924 (bronze) , 1928, 1932 (bronze) , 1936	0	0	2	2	
7	David Bratton				1904 (gold)	1	0	0	1	
7	Budd Goodwin	FP			1904 (gold)	1	0	0	1	
7	Louis Handley	FP			1904 (gold)	1	0	0	1	
7	David Hesser	FP			1904 (gold)	1	0	0	1	
7	Joe Ruddy	FP			1904 (gold)	1	0	0	1	
7	James Steen				1904 (gold)	1	0	0	1	
7	George Van Cleaf	FP		5 ft 8 in (1.73 m)	1904 (gold)	1	0	0	1	
14	Rex Beach				1904 (silver)	0	1	0	1	
14	David Hammond				1904 (silver)	0	1	0	1	
14	Charles Healy				1904 (silver)	0	1	0	1	
14	Frank Kehoe				1904 (silver)	0	1	0	1	
14	Jerome Steever				1904 (silver)	0	1	0	1	
14	Edwin Swatek				1904 (silver)	0	1	0	1	
14	Bill Tuttle				1904 (silver)	0	1	0	1	
14	Doug Burke	D		6 ft 0 in (1.83 m)	1984 (silver)	0	1	0	1	
14	Chris Dorst	GK		6 ft 3.5 in (1.92 m)	1984 (silver)	0	1	0	1	
14	Gary Figueroa	D		6 ft 0 in (1.83 m)	1984 (silver)	0	1	0	1	
14	Drew McDonald	CB		6 ft 4.5 in (1.94 m)	1984 (silver)	0	1	0	1	
14	Tim Shaw	D		6 ft 2 in (1.88 m)	1984 (silver)	0	1	0	1	
14	John Siman	CB		6 ft 5.5 in (1.97 m)	1984 (silver)	0	1	0	1	
14	Jon Svendsen	CB		6 ft 2.5 in (1.89 m)	1984 (silver)	0	1	0	1	
14	Joe Vargas	D		6 ft 2.5 in (1.89 m)	1984 (silver)	0	1	0	1	
14	James Bergeson	D		6 ft 0 in (1.83 m)	1988 (silver)	0	1	0	1	
14	Greg Boyer	CF		6 ft 2.5 in (1.89 m)	1988 (silver)	0	1	0	1	
14	Jeff Campbell	CB		6 ft 3.5 in (1.92 m)	1988 (silver) , 1992	0	1	0	1	
14	Chris Duplanty	GK		6 ft 2.5 in (1.89 m)	1988 (silver) , 1992, 1996	0	1	0	1	
14	Mike Evans	D		6 ft 2 in (1.88 m)	1988 (silver) , 1992, 1996	0	1	0	1	
14	Doug Kimbell	CB		6 ft 8.5 in (2.04 m)	1988 (silver) , 1992	0	1	0	1	
14	Craig Klass	CF	L	6 ft 4.5 in (1.94 m)	1988 (silver) , 1992	0	1	0	1	
14	Alan Mouchawar	U		6 ft 0.5 in (1.84 m)	1988 (silver)	0	1	0	1	
14	Tony Azevedo	D	R	6 ft 1 in (1.85 m)	2000, 2004, 2008 (silver) , 2012, 2016	0	1	0	1	
14	Ryan Bailey	CF	R	6 ft 5.5 in (1.97 m)	2000, 2004, 2008 (silver) , 2012	0	1	0	1	
14	Layne Beaubien	CB/U	R	6 ft 5.5 in (1.97 m)	2004, 2008 (silver) , 2012	0	1	0	1	
14	Brandon Brooks	GK	R	6 ft 5.5 in (1.97 m)	2004, 2008 (silver)	0	1	0	1	
14	Peter Hudnut	CB	R	6 ft 5 in (1.96 m)	2008 (silver) , 2012	0	1	0	1	
14	Tim Hutten	CB	R	6 ft 5 in (1.96 m)	2008 (silver) , 2012	0	1	0	1	
14	J. W. Krumpholz	CF	R	6 ft 3 in (1.91 m)	2008 (silver)	0	1	0	1	
14	Rick Merlo	U	R	6 ft 3 in (1.91 m)	2008 (silver)	0	1	0	1	
14	Merrill Moses	GK	R	6 ft 3 in (1.91 m)	2008 (silver) , 2012, 2016	0	1	0	1	
14	Jeff Powers	CF/CB/U	R	6 ft 7 in (2.01 m)	2004, 2008 (silver) , 2012	0	1	0	1	
14	Jesse Smith	CB/U	R	6 ft 4 in (1.93 m)	2004, 2008 (silver) , 2012, 2016	0	1	0	1	
14	Peter Varellas	D	L	6 ft 3 in (1.91 m)	2008 (silver) , 2012	0	1	0	1	
14	Adam Wright	D	R	6 ft 3 in (1.91 m)	2004, 2008 (silver) , 2012	0	1	0	1	
50	Gwynne Evans				1904 (bronze)	0	0	1	1	
50	Gus Goessling				1904 (bronze)	0	0	1	1	
50	John Meyers				1904 (bronze)	0	0	1	1	
50	Bill Orthwein				1904 (bronze)	0	0	1	1	
50	Amedee Reyburn				1904 (bronze)	0	0	1	1	
50	Frank Schreiner				1904 (bronze)	0	0	1	1	
50	Manfred Toeppen				1904 (bronze)	0	0	1	1	
50	Art Austin	FP			1924 (bronze)	0	0	1	1	
50	Elmer Collett	GK			1924 (bronze)	0	0	1	1	
50	Jam Handy	FP			1924 (bronze)	0	0	1	1	
50	Oliver Horn	FP		5 ft 10 in (1.78 m)	1924 (bronze)	0	0	1	1	
50	Fred Lauer	GK			1924 (bronze) , 1936	0	0	1	1	
50	George Mitchell	FP			1924 (bronze) , 1928	0	0	1	1	
50	John Norton	FP			1924 (bronze)	0	0	1	1	
50	George Schroth	FP		6 ft 4 in (1.93 m)	1924 (bronze) , 1928	0	0	1	1	
50	Herb Vollmer	FP		6 ft 0 in (1.83 m)	1920, 1924 (bronze)	0	0	1	1	
50	Johnny Weissmuller	FP		6 ft 3 in (1.91 m)	1924 (bronze) , 1928	0	0	1	1	
50	Austin Clapp	FP			1932 (bronze)	0	0	1	1	
50	Phil Daubenspeck	FP			1932 (bronze) , 1936	0	0	1	1	
50	Charley Finn	FP			1932 (bronze) , 1936	0	0	1	1	
50	Harold McCallister	FP			1932 (bronze) , 1936	0	0	1	1	
50	Cal Strong	FP			1932 (bronze)	0	0	1	1	
50	Herb Wildman	GK			1932 (bronze) , 1936	0	0	1	1	
50	Peter Asch	FP		6 ft 2 in (1.88 m)	1972 (bronze)	0	0	1	1	
50	Steve Barnett	GK		6 ft 3 in (1.91 m)	1968, 1972 (bronze)	0	0	1	1	
50	Bruce Bradley	FP		6 ft 2 in (1.88 m)	1968, 1972 (bronze)	0	0	1	1	
50	Stan Cole	CF/D	R	6 ft 1 in (1.85 m)	1964, 1968, 1972 (bronze)	0	0	1	1	
50	Jim Ferguson	D		6 ft 2 in (1.88 m)	1972 (bronze)	0	0	1	1	
50	Eric Lindroth	CF	L	6 ft 2 in (1.88 m)	1972 (bronze)	0	0	1	1	
50	John Parker	FP		6 ft 2 in (1.88 m)	1968, 1972 (bronze)	0	0	1	1	
50	Gary Sheerer	FP		5 ft 8.5 in (1.74 m)	1968, 1972 (bronze)	0	0	1	1	
50	Jim Slatton	GK		6 ft 2 in (1.88 m)	1972 (bronze)	0	0	1	1	
50	Russ Webb	CB		6 ft 2 in (1.88 m)	1968, 1972 (bronze)	0	0	1	1	
50	Barry Weitzenberg	FP		6 ft 1 in (1.85 m)	1968, 1972 (bronze)	0	0	1	1	
Rk	Name	Pos	H	Height	Games as player	G	S	B	T	Ref
Rk	Name	Pos	H	Height	Games as player	Medals				Ref

=== Head coaches ===
The following tables are pre-sorted by number of Olympic medals (in descending order), type of the Olympic medal (in descending order), date of receiving an Olympic medal (in ascending order), name of the person (in ascending order), respectively.

Monte Nitzkowski is the first and only man to have won two Olympic medals as the head coach of the United States men's national team.

Rk	Name	Games as head coach	Medals				Ref
Rk	Name	Games as head coach	G	S	B	T	Ref
1	Monte Nitzkowski	1972 (bronze) , 1984 (silver)	0	1	1	2	
2	Gus Sundstrom	1904 (gold)	1	0	0	1	
3	Alex Meffert	1904 (silver)	0	1	0	1	
3	Bill Barnett	1988 (silver)	0	1	0	1	
3	Terry Schroeder	2008 (silver)	0	1	0	1	
6	(Unknown)	1904 (bronze)	0	0	1	1	
6	Otto Wahle	1924 (bronze)	0	0	1	1	
6	Frank Rivas	1932 (bronze)	0	0	1	1	

Terry Schroeder is the first and only American (man or woman) to have won medals in the Olympic water polo tournaments both as a player and as a head coach.

Rk	Name	Games		Medals				Ref
Rk	Name	As player	As head coach	G	S	B	T	Ref
1	Terry Schroeder	1984 (silver) , 1988 (silver) , 1992	2008 (silver) , 2012	0	3	0	3	

== Multiple Olympic medalists in water polo, diving and swimming ==
Budd Goodwin is the only American to have won Olympic medals in water polo, diving and swimming.

Name	Height	Water polo				Diving	Swimming	Medals				Ref
Name	Height	Year	No.	Pos	H	Diving	Swimming	G	S	B	T	Ref
Budd Goodwin		1904 (gold)		FP		1904 (bronze) – Plunge for distance	1904 (gold) – 4×50 yard freestyle relay 1908 (bronze) – 4×200 meter freestyle relay	2	0	2	4	

== Multiple Olympic medalists in water polo and diving ==
Aside from Budd Goodwin, Frank Kehoe is the other American to have won Olympic medals in water polo and diving.

Name	Height	Water polo				Diving	Medals				Ref
Name	Height	Year	No.	Pos	H	Diving	G	S	B	T	Ref
Frank Kehoe		1904 (silver)				1904 (bronze) – Platform	0	1	1	2	

== Multiple Olympic medalists in water polo and swimming ==
The following table is pre-sorted by number of Olympic medals (in descending order), type of the Olympic medal (in descending order), date of the Olympic water polo tournament (in ascending order), name of the player (in ascending order), respectively.

Twelve American athletes aside from Budd Goodwin have won Olympic medals in water polo and swimming.

As a member of the 1924 and 1928 U.S. Olympic water polo team, Johnny Weissmuller won five Olympic gold medals in swimming and one bronze medal in water polo.

Tim Shaw is the only American athlete to have won Olympic medals in water polo and swimming after World War II.

Rk	Name	Height	Water polo				Swimming	Medals				Ref
Rk	Name	Height	Year	No.	Pos	H	Swimming	G	S	B	T	Ref
1	Johnny Weissmuller	6 ft 3 in (1.91 m)	1924 (bronze); 1928		FP		1924 (gold) – 100 meter freestyle 1924 (gold) – 400 meter freestyle 1924 (gold) – 4×200 meter freestyle relay 1928 (gold) – 100 meter freestyle 1928 (gold) – 4×200 meter freestyle relay	5	0	1	6	
2	Wally O'Connor		1924 (bronze); 1928; 1932 (bronze); 1936		FP		1924 (gold) – 4×200 meter freestyle relay	1	0	2	3	
3	Louis Handley		1904 (gold)		FP		1904 (gold) – 4×50 yard freestyle relay	2	0	0	2	
3	Joe Ruddy		1904 (gold)		FP		1904 (gold) – 4×50 yard freestyle relay	2	0	0	2	
5	Austin Clapp		1932 (bronze)		FP		1928 (gold) – 4×200 meter freestyle relay	1	0	1	2	
6	David Hammond		1904 (silver)				1904 (silver) – 4×50 yard freestyle relay	0	2	0	2	
6	Bill Tuttle		1904 (silver)				1904 (silver) – 4×50 yard freestyle relay	0	2	0	2	
6	Tim Shaw	6 ft 2 in (1.88 m)	1984 (silver)	12	D		1976 (silver) – 400 meter freestyle	0	2	0	2	
9	Gwynne Evans		1904 (bronze)				1904 (bronze) – 4×50 yard freestyle relay	0	0	2	2	
9	Bill Orthwein		1904 (bronze)				1904 (bronze) – 4×50 yard freestyle relay	0	0	2	2	
9	Amedee Reyburn		1904 (bronze)				1904 (bronze) – 4×50 yard freestyle relay	0	0	2	2	
9	Jam Handy		1924 (bronze)		FP		1904 (bronze) – 440 yard breaststroke	0	0	2	2	

== See also ==
- United States men's Olympic water polo team statistics
  - United States men's Olympic water polo team statistics (appearances)
  - United States men's Olympic water polo team statistics (matches played)
  - United States men's Olympic water polo team statistics (scorers)
  - United States men's Olympic water polo team statistics (goalkeepers)
- List of United States men's Olympic water polo team rosters
- United States men's Olympic water polo team results
- United States men's national water polo team
