= Amedee Reyburn =

American swimmer (1879–1920)

Amedee V. Reyburn Jr.
- Reyburn circa 1910 by his monoplane

Personal information
- Full name: Amedee Valle Reyburn, Jr.
- National team: United States
- Born: March 25, 1879 St. Louis, Missouri
- Died: February 10, 1920 (aged 40) Milwaukee, Wisconsin
- Occupations: Business manager Real Estate Investor
- Spouses: Julia Lee (1900); Florence Adele Kelly (1906)
- Children: 1

Sport
- Sport: Swimming
- Strokes: Freestyle, water polo
- Club: Missouri Athletic Club (MAC)
- College team: Washington University St. Louis (Football)
- Coach: Alex Meffert (MAC)
Medal record
Representing the United States
Olympic Games
Men's swimming
| Bronze medal – third place | 1904 St. Louis | 4x50 yard freestyle |
Men's water polo
| Bronze medal – third place | 1904 St. Louis | Team competition |

Amedee Valle Reyburn Jr. (March 25, 1879 – February 10, 1920) was an American freestyle swimmer and water polo player who won two bronze medals in the 1904 Summer Olympics in his native St. Louis. He played football for Washington University, and by 1905 served as an executive and part owner of the Westminster Automobile Company of St. Louis. A flying enthusiast in the early years of aviation, he participated in a North American coast-to-coast trans-continental flight competition in 1911 that ended in Los Angeles.

== Early life ==
Amedee Valle Reyburn Jr. was born on March 25, 1879, in St. Louis, Missouri to Henrietta Patterson Reyburn and Amedee Valle Reyburn Senior, who worked as a Manager at the Merchantile Trust Company of St. Louis. Reyburn Jr. attended St. Louis's Washington University where he played tackle on their football team for two seasons. By 1903, Reyburn Jr. trained and competed in swimming as a member of the Missouri Athletic Club, and played on their water polo team. In April, 1903, he suffered from an appendicitis, but recovered.

== Missouri Athletic Club coaches ==
Alex Meffert was the swimming director for the Missouri Athletic Club from their opening in 1903 through 1907, before accepting a position with the Chicago Athletic Club. He did the majority of preparatory training for the Missouri Athletic Club's swimmers and water polo players who attended the 1904 Olympics. In freestyle competition, Meffert advocated a traditional crawl stroke, with the body aligned parallel to the bottom of the pool, and a single breath taken after a left and right arm stroke cycle. He did not strongly advocate more than a single two-beat kick per stroke cycle. While Meffert worked with the members of the New York Athletic Club before the Olympics in July and part of August, 1904, the Missouri Club was trained by Assistant Coach and Instructor Pete Rodgers, and team Captain Billy Orthwein, a Yale graduate and future lawyer. Meffert had been the regular coach, and returned to train the Missouri club's swimmers and water polo players in late August.

== 1904 Olympic bronze medals ==
In the September, 1904 St. Louis Olympics, Reyburn won bronze medals as a member of the American 4x50 yard freestyle relay team and as a member of the Missouri Athletic Club water polo team. In the 4x50 yard relay, he swam as the lead swimmer with the team of Gwynne Evans, Marquard Schwarz, and anchor Bill Orthwein.

The Water Polo contest was held at the 1904 St. Louis World's Fair on September 5–6, at the Life Saving Exhibition Lake. In Olympic competition, America's Missouri Athletic Club water polo team placed third to the gold medal-winning team from America's New York Athletic Club, and the silver medal team from America's Chicago Athletic Association. Besides Reyburn, the Missouri Athletic Club's full water polo team included Gwynne Evans, Gus Goessling, John Meyers, Bill Orthwein, Frank Schreiner, and Manfred Toeppen. In the Water Polo semi-final round, the New York Athletic Club team soundly defeated the Missouri Athletic Club team by a score of 5–0 on September 5. In the final round, the New York Athletic Club defeated the Chicago Athletic Association Club by a score of 6–0 on September 6. Louis Handley, the future swimming instructor for the Women's Swimming Association of New York served as a key player with the New York Athletic Club team.

=== Personal and business life ===
By 1901, Reyburn had been heir to a sizable fortune on the death of his mother. On June 5, 1900, he married Julia Lee of St. Louis at St. Francis Xavier's Church, who predeceased him on December 14, 1903, with her funeral on December 16, at the Cathedral Chapel in St. Louis. Julia Lee Reyburn, whose father William H. Lee had died the prior year, was twenty years old at the time of her death, from typhoid fever.

Reyburn worked in the automobile business in St. Louis and was a part owner of the Westminster Automobile Company of St. Louis, an automobile manufacturer. He owned several real estate properties in the St. Louis area.

With much of New York high society in attendance among the 2000 invited, on June 4, 1906, Reyburn married Florence Adele Kelly, at St. Anne's Church on 12th Street in New York, though the couple planned to reside primarily in St. Louis where Reyburn had his business and family. Kelly later filed for divorce in November 1912, after a separation in August of that year primarily due to Reyburn's frequent absences and neglect. She obtained the divorce on December 6, and received a sizable monthly alimony from Reyburn and custody of the couple's son, born around 1908.

=== Aviator ===
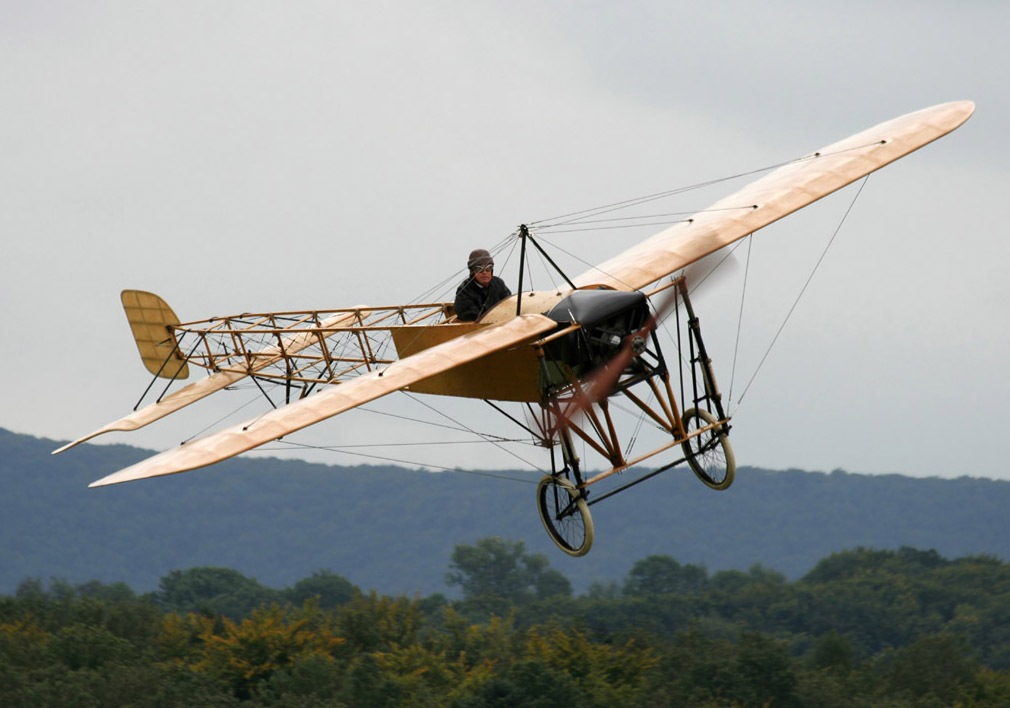
Blériot-type monoplane similar to Reyburn's

An avid aviator, on September 17, 1911, Reyburn entered a trans-continental aviation race with a $50,000 Hearst prize beginning from New York to Chicago to Los Angeles. The full route was a distance of roughly 3,000 miles. Reyburn planned to fly the route using a Bleriot type two-seated monoplane, which he had helped to update and improve on the design. The plane was similar in design and appearance to Frenchman Louis Bleriot's Blériot XI which crossed the English Channel in 1909, and there were variations of the plane competing in competitions in 1911. Reyburn's plane had a 6-cylinder, 2 cycle engine with 100 horsepower.

In October, 1911, Reyburn participated in a nine-day competitive aviation meet under the direction of the Aero Club of St. Louis at St. Louis's Kinloch field. The competition tested such skills as bomb dropping, accurate landings, balloon chasing, and formation flying in quadrilles. Reyburn had a narrow escape on October 31, 1911, when his plane struck the ground and stood on end at Kinloch field in St. Louis.

According to several sources, specifically Olympedia.com, Reyburn was severely injured as the result of an aviation accident around 1920, although accounts of the incident in American newspapers of the day cannot be found. He died about a month after being admitted in a Milwaukee hospital on February 10, 1920, possibly unable to recover from the injuries he received in the plane accident, and his body was transported to St. Louis. Rumors of Reyburn's death began circulating after his mechanic, Ray J. Raymond, was killed starting Reyburn's monoplane with Reyburn in the cockpit at Kinloch field in St. Louis on September 22, 1911. Reyburn's funeral was held on February 13 in St. Louis and he was buried there at Calvary Cemetery.

== See also ==
- List of athletes with Olympic medals in different disciplines
- List of Olympic medalists in swimming (men)
