= Edwin Swatek =

American swimmer (1885–1966)

Edwin Paul Swatek
Personal information
- Full name: Edwin Paul Swatek
- National team: United States
- Born: January 7, 1885 Chicago, Illinois, U.S.
- Died: January 2, 1966 (aged 80) Camarillo, California, U.S.
- Spouse: Clara J. Bobzien Swatek

Sport
- Sport: Swimming, Water Polo
- Events: Backstroke, water polo
- Club: Chicago Athletic Association
- Coached by: John Robinson (CAA)
Medal record
Men's water polo
Representing the United States
| Silver medal – second place | 1904 St. Louis | Water polo |

Edwin Paul Swatek (January 7, 1885 – January 2, 1966) was an American backstroke swimmer and water polo player who competed for the Chicago Athletic Association and won a silver medal in water polo at the 1904 Summer Olympics in St. Louis. After his years as an elite athlete, he had a fifty-year career as a Dentist in greater Chicago.

== 1904 St. Louis Olympics ==
In the 1904 St. Louis Olympics he won a silver medal as a member of the Chicago Athletic Association water polo team. The 1904 Olympic water polo contest was held at the 1904 St. Louis World's Fair on September 5–6, at the Life Saving Exhibition Lake. America's Missouri Athletic Club water polo team placed third, receiving the bronze, to the gold medal-winning team from America's New York Athletic Club, and the second place silver medal team from Swatek's Chicago Athletic Association, also an American team. In the Water Polo semi-final round, the New York Athletic Club team soundly defeated the Missouri Athletic Club team by a score of 5–0 on September 5. Only the three American teams competed, and no foreign team. In the final round, the New York Athletic Club, captained by Louis Handley, defeated the Chicago Athletic Association Club in Chicago Club's only match by a score of 6–0 on September 6. The Chicago Athletic Club team at the 1904 Olypmics included Rex Beach, Jerome Steever, Swatek, Charles Healy, Frank Kehoe, David Hammond, who served as Captain in 1904, and William Tuttle. John Robinson was an occasional water polo coach for the Chicago Athletic Association and also coached swimming at the Chicago Club. He was credited by many historians with first bringing the game of Water Polo to the United States from England in 1888.

Swatek also competed in the 100-metres Olympic backstroke competition in the 1904 Olympics, but without winning a medal. He swam in a 100-yard freestyle handicap, placing second in the non-medal event. He was signed up to participate in the 100 metres freestyle competition but did not start the race.

Swatek remained a member of the Chicago Athletic Association throughout his time in Chicago. In early June 1932, he competed in a golf tournament attempting to qualify for the President's Trophy at Ridgemoor Country Club in greater Chicago.

=== Marriage ===
At 26, Swatek married Clara Johanna Bobzien, 23, around April of 1911, remaining married throughout his life.

=== Career ===
In career pursuits, Swatek served in the field of Dentistry in Chicago from around 1930-1958, subsequently retiring to California.

After a lengthy illness, he died in a local hospital at the age of 80, on January 2, 1966 in Camarillo, California. He was said to have held a distance record for swimming underwater. He had lived in Camarillo since retiring there from Chicago around 1959. He was survived by his wife Clara J. Bobzien Swatek, a daughter, a son, two sisters and five grandchildren. Funeral services were held on the morning of January 4 at Griffin Brothers Funeral Parlor, and he was buried at Ivy Lawn Cemetery. He had been a member of the Illinois Dental Association, and the Masonic Lodge in Chicago.
