= Water polo at the 1904 Summer Olympics =

Men's water polo at the Games of the III Olympiad
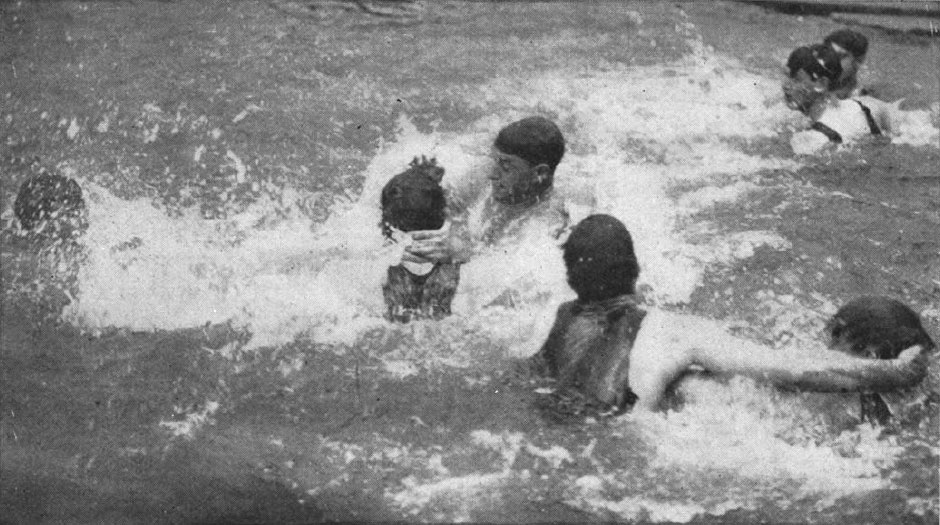
- Water polo game during 1904 Summer Olympics.
- Venue: U.S. Life Saving Exhibit Lake
- Date: September 5 (semifinal); September 6 (final)
- Competitors: 21 from 1 nation

Medalists
1st place, gold medalist(s)		New York Athletic Club; United States
2nd place, silver medalist(s)		Chicago Athletic Association; United States
3rd place, bronze medalist(s)		Missouri Athletic Club; United States

At the 1904 Summer Olympics, a water polo tournament was contested, with three club teams of seven players each. A German team tried to enter, but its entry was refused because their players did not play for the same club.

The event took place in an artificial lake in Forest Park, the location of both the Olympics and the World's Fair. Two of the Olympians died of typhoid fever soon after the competition, possibly from contamination caused by livestock at the opposite end of the lake.

Previously, the International Olympic Committee and International Swimming Federation (FINA) considered the water polo event at the 1904 Olympics as a demonstration sport. However, in July 2021, after accepting the recommendation of Olympic historian Bill Mallon, the IOC recognized water polo along with several others as an official sport of the 1904 Olympic program.

== Medal summary ==
Gold	Silver	Bronze
United States; New York Athletic Club; David Bratton; George Van Cleaf; Leo Goodwin; Louis Handley; David Hesser; Joe Ruddy; James Steen	United States; Chicago Athletic Association; Rex Beach; Jerome Steever; Edwin Swatek; Charles Healy; Frank Kehoe; David Hammond; Bill Tuttle	United States; Missouri Athletic Club; John Meyers; Manfred Toeppen; Gwynne Evans; Amedee Reyburn; Frank Schreiner; Augustus Goessling; Bill Orthwein

== Sources ==
- PDF documents in the LA84 Foundation Digital Library:
  - Official Report of the 1904 Olympic Games (download, archive)
- Water polo on the Olympedia website
  - Water polo at the 1904 Summer Olympics (men's tournament)
- Water polo on the Sports Reference website
  - Water polo at the 1904 Summer Games (men's tournament) (archived)
