= List of athletes with Olympic medals in different sports =

The List of athletes with Olympic medals in different sports is a list of athletes who have won medals in two different sports at the Olympic Games.

== List ==
This table is sorted by individual total gold medals.

Athletes have won medals in Winter Olympics only
Athletes have won medals in both Summer and Winter Olympics

Table with arts competitions and 1906 Intercalated Games.

#	Athlete	Sex	Period	Sports	Gold medal	Silver medal	Bronze medal	Tot.
1	(United States) Johnny Weissmuller	M	1924–1928	Swimming • Water polo	5	0	1	6
2	(United Kingdom) Paul Radmilovic	M	1908–1920	Swimming • Water polo	4	0	0	4
2	(German Empire) Carl Schuhmann	M	1896	Gymnastics • Wrestling	4	0	0	4
4	(Norway) Johan Grøttumsbråten	M	1924–1932	Cross-country skiing • Nordic combined	3	1	2	6
5	(Soviet Union) / (International Olympic Committee) / (Russia) Anfisa Reztsova	F	1988–1994	Cross-country skiing • Biathlon	3	1	1	5
6	(Netherlands) Jorien ter Mors	F	2014–2018	Speed skating • Short-track speed skating	3	0	1	4
7	(United Kingdom) John Jarvis	M	1900	Swimming • Water polo	3	0	0	3
7	(United States) Karch Kiraly	M	1984–1996	Volleyball • Beach volleyball	3	0	0	3
7	(Norway) Thorleif Haug	M	1924	Cross-country skiing • Nordic combined	3	0	0	3
7	(Czech Republic) Ester Ledecká	F	2018–2022	Alpine skiing • Snowboarding	3	0	0	3
7	(Sweden) Daniel Norling	M	1908–1920	Equestrian • Gymnastics	3	0	0	3
12	(East Germany) / (Germany) Christa Luding	F	1984–1992	Cycling • Speed skating	2	2	1	5
13	(German Empire) Fritz Hofmann	M	1896	Gymnastics • Athletics	2	1	1	4
14	(Finland) Heikki Hasu	M	1948–1952	Cross-country skiing • Nordic combined	2	1	0	3
14	(United States) Morris Kirksey	M	1920	Athletics • Rugby union	2	1	0	3
14	(United States) Walter Winans	M	1908–1912	Art competitions • Shooting	2	1	0	3
14	(Lands of the Crown of Saint Stephen) / (Kingdom of Hungary (1920–1946)) Alfréd Hajós	M	1896–1924	Art competitions • Swimming	2	1	0	3
18	(United States) Conn Findlay	M	1956–1976	Rowing • Sailing	2	0	2	4
18	(United States) Budd Goodwin	M	1904–1908	Swimming • Water polo	2	0	2	4
20	(Sweden) Oswald Holmberg	M	1906–1912	Gymnastics • Tug of war	2	0	1	3
20	(Australia) Teddy Flack	M	1896	Athletics • Tennis	2	0	1	3
22	(United Kingdom) Rob Derbyshire	M	1900–1908	Swimming • Water polo	2	0	0	2
22	(United States) Joe Ruddy	M	1904	Swimming • Water polo	2	0	0	2
22	(United States) Lou Handley	M	1904	Swimming • Water polo	2	0	0	2
22	(United States) Eddie Eagan	M	1920–1932	Bobsleigh • Boxing	2	0	0	2
26	(Norway) Oddbjørn Hagen	M	1936	Cross-country skiing • Nordic combined	1	2	0	3
26	(Weimar Republic) Erich Rademacher	M	1928–1932	Swimming • Water polo	1	2	0	3
26	(United States) Wally O'Connor	M	1924–1932	Swimming • Water polo	1	2	0	3
26	(Sweden) Gustaf Dyrssen	M	1920–1936	Fencing • Modern pentathlon	1	2	0	3
26	(United States) Lauryn Williams	F	2004–2014	Athletics • Bobsleigh	1	2	0	3
31	(Canada) Clara Hughes	F	1996–2010	Cycling • Speed skating	1	1	4	6
32	(Sweden) Sven Thofelt	M	1928–1948	Fencing • Modern pentathlon	1	1	1	3
32	(Denmark) Viggo Jensen	M	1896	Shooting • Weightlifting	1	1	1	3
32	(United States) Aileen Riggin	F	1920–1924	Diving • Swimming	1	1	1	3
35	(Russia) / (International Olympic Committee) Ruslan Zakharov	M	2014–2022	Short-track speed skating • Speed skating	1	1	0	2
35	(United Kingdom) Rebecca Romero	F	2004–2008	Cycling • Rowing	1	1	0	2
35	(Norway) Jacob Tullin Thams	M	1924–1936	Sailing • Ski jumping	1	1	0	2
35	(Sweden) Gösta Åsbrink	M	1908–1912	Gymnastics • Modern pentathlon	1	1	0	2
35	(Canada) Valérie Maltais	F	2010–2022	Short track speed skating • Speed skating	1	1	0	2
35	(France) Jean Collas	M	1900	Rugby union • Tug of war	1	1	0	2
35	(France) Charles Gondouin	M	1900	Rugby union • Tug of war	1	1	0	2
35	(United States) Jennison Heaton	M	1928	Bobsleigh • Skeleton	1	1	0	2
35	(France) Émile Sarrade	M	1900	Rugby union • Tug of war	1	1	0	2
44	(Germany) Denise Herrmann	F	2014–2022	Cross-country skiing • Biathlon	1	0	2	3
45	(Italy) Gerda Weissensteiner	F	1994–2006	Bobsleigh • Luge	1	0	1	2
45	(United States) Austin Clapp	M	1928–1932	Swimming • Water polo	1	0	1	2
45	(United Kingdom) Peter Kemp	M	1900	Swimming • Water polo	1	0	1	2
45	(United Kingdom) Edward Barrett	M	1908	Tug of war • Wrestling	1	0	1	2
49	(Belgium) Fernand de Montigny	M	1906–1924	Fencing • Field hockey	0	2	3	5
50	(Belgium) Gérard Blitz	M	1920–1936	Swimming • Water polo	0	2	2	4
51	(East Germany) Roswitha Krause	F	1968–1980	Handball • Swimming	0	2	1	3
51	(United States) Katherine Rawls	F	1932–1936	Diving • Swimming	0	2	1	3
51	(United States) John Heaton	M	1928–1948	Bobsleigh • Skeleton	0	2	1	3
51	(Belgium) Joseph De Combe	M	1924–1936	Swimming • Water polo	0	2	1	3
51	(Belgium) Victor Boin	M	1908–1920	Fencing • Water polo	0	2	1	3
56	(United States) Eric Flaim	M	1988–1994	Short-track speed skating • Speed skating	0	2	0	2
56	(United States) Tim Shaw	M	1976–1984	Swimming • Water polo	0	2	0	2
56	(Austria-Hungary) Otto Herschmann	M	1896–1912	Fencing • Swimming	0	2	0	2
56	(Norway) Olaf Hoffsbakken	M	1936	Cross-country skiing • Nordic combined	0	2	0	2
56	(Norway) Thoralf Strømstad	M	1924	Cross-country skiing • Nordic combined	0	2	0	2
56	(United States) Helen Wainwright	F	1920–1924	Diving • Swimming	0	2	0	2
56	(United States) David Hammond	M	1904	Swimming • Water polo	0	2	0	2
56	(United States) Bill Tuttle	M	1904	Swimming • Water polo	0	2	0	2
56	(German Empire) Georg Hoffmann	M	1904	Diving • Swimming	0	2	0	2
56	(United States) Eddy Alvarez	M	2014–2020	Short-track speed skating • Baseball	0	2	0	2
66	(Finland) / (Finland) Magnus Wegelius	M	1908–1924	Gymnastics • Shooting	0	1	4	5
67	(Sweden) Pontus Hanson	M	1908–1920	Swimming • Water polo	0	1	3	4
67	(Sweden) Harald Julin	M	1908–1920	Swimming • Water polo	0	1	3	4
67	(United States) Frank Kugler	M	1904	Tug of war • Wrestling • Weightlifting	0	1	3	4
70	(Germany) Susi Erdmann	F	1992–2002	Bobsleigh • Luge	0	1	2	3
70	(Denmark) Holger Nielsen	M	1896	Fencing • Shooting	0	1	2	3
72	(Switzerland) Alois Kälin	M	1968–1972	Cross-country skiing • Nordic combined	0	1	1	2
72	(Norway) Sverre Brodahl	M	1936	Cross-country skiing • Nordic combined	0	1	1	2
72	(Sweden) Georg de Laval	M	1912	Shooting • Modern pentathlon	0	1	1	2
72	(United States) Frank Kehoe	M	1904	Diving • Water polo	0	1	1	2
72	(United States) Joseph Lydon	M	1904	Boxing • Football	0	1	1	2
72	(Norway) Carl Albert Andersen	M	1900–1908	Athletics • Gymnastics	0	1	1	2
72	(Germany) Alexandra Burghardt	F	2022–2024	Bobsleigh • Athletics	0	1	1	2
79	(France) Louis Martin	M	1900	Swimming • Water polo	0	0	3	3
80	(Sweden) Hjördis Töpel	F	1924	Diving • Swimming	0	0	2	2
80	(United States) Jam Handy	M	1904–1924	Swimming • Water polo	0	0	2	2
80	(United States) John Montgomery	M	1912–1920	Equestrian • Polo	0	0	2	2
80	(Sweden) Bertil Uggla	M	1912–1924	Athletics • Modern pentathlon	0	0	2	2
80	(Finland) / (Finland) Veli Nieminen	M	1908–1920	Gymnastics • Shooting	0	0	2	2
80	(United States) Gwynne Evans	M	1904	Swimming • Water polo	0	0	2	2
80	(United States) Bill Orthwein	M	1904	Swimming • Water polo	0	0	2	2
80	(United States) Amedee Reyburn	M	1904	Swimming • Water polo	0	0	2	2
80	(France) Désiré Mérchez	M	1900	Swimming • Water polo	0	0	2	2
80	(Greece) Sotirios Versis	M	1896	Athletics • Weightlifting	0	0	2	2

== See also ==
- List of Olympians who have won medals in both the Summer and Winter Olympics
- List of multi-sport athletes
- List of multi-sport champions
