= Hastedt =

Hastedt may refer to:

- Hastedt (Bremen), subdistrict in Bremen, Germany
- Culver Hastedt (1884 – 1966), U.S. sprinter and Olympic Gold Medalist in 1904
