= Raymond Thorne =

American swimmer (1887–1921)

Ray Thorne
- Thorne at 1904 Olympics in CAA Jersey

Personal information
- Full name: Raymond Comstock Thorne
- Nickname: "Ray"
- National team: United States
- Born: April 29, 1887 Chicago, Illinois, U.S.
- Died: January 10, 1921 (aged 33) Los Angeles, California, U.S.
- Education: Dartmouth College
- Occupations: Aviation, Montgomery Ward Executive
- Spouse: Mayme Woods (m. 1909)

Sport
- Sport: Swimming
- Strokes: Freestyle
- Club: Chicago Athletic Association (CAA)
- Coach: John Robinson (CAA)
Medal record
Men's swimming
Representing the United States
Olympics
Silver medal – second place	1904 St. Louis	4x50 yard freestyle relay

Raymond Comstock Thorne (April 29, 1887 – January 10, 1921) was an American competition swimmer who represented the United States at the 1904 Summer Olympics in St. Louis, Missouri, winning a silver medal in the 4x50 yard relay. He later worked as an executive for Montgomery-Ward as had his father William. He died prematurely at 33 in a car accident in Los Angeles.

== Early life ==
Raymond Comstock Thorne was born in Chicago, Illinois on April 29, 1887 to William Cobb Thorne and Katherine Comstock Thorne of Chicago. Raymond's father William Thorne would become the President of the mail order house associated with Montgomery-Ward. Like a number of top ranked local competitive swimmers, Raymond C. Thorne swam for the Chicago Athletic Association, coached by John Robinson at least through 1904, though Thorne competed in other sports as well. At fourteen, on May 17, 1902, he represented the Chicago Manual Training School in a golf tournament, where his team defeated Chicago's South Side Academy.

In March, 1904, he competed for Chicago's University High School, in a track meet sponsored by the First Regiment Athletic Association held at the Chicago Armory, where he placed second in a preliminary of the 40-yard dash, winning the fourth preliminary heat, but did not place in the finals. On April 27, 1904, in a swim meet shortly before the St. Louis Olympics, Thorne captained the Chicago Athletic Association Junior Team, coached by M. H. Butler, consisting of sixteen Junior members in a meet against the Chicago Athletic Club's High School members.

Thorne attended Dartmouth College, and studied business, though he began work prior to graduating.

== 1904 St. Louis Olympics ==
In the 1904 Olympics he won a silver medal as a member of the American 4×50 yard freestyle relay team, consisting of David Hammond, Bill Tuttle, and Hugo Goetz. A team from the New York Athletic Club won the event with a time of 2:04.6. The bronze medal was taken by a team from the Missouri Athletic Club.

Thorne placed sixth in the 50 yard swimming event at the St. Louis Olympics, though his time was not recorded. The event was won by Zoltan Halmay of Hungary in a time of 28.0.

After the Olympics, on March, 25, 1905, in a meet against the Missouri Athletic Club in St. Louis, Thorne placed second in the 100-yard freestyle event against the Missouri Athletic Club's Marquard Schwartz, who swam a winning time of 1:07.8. The Missouri Club soundly won the meet.

=== Marriage ===
In an elopement while he was a Sophomore at Dartmouth College, he married R. Maymie Woods of Boston in Providence, Rhode Island on May 10, 1909. He met Miss Woods while studying business at a Boston area college she was attending. He returned to Dartmouth in 1909, as part of the class of 1911, and was a member of the DKE Fraternity, but returned to Chicago after marrying, and did not complete college. In his professional life, he worked for Chicago's Montgomery, Ward and Company, and in the field of aviation.

=== Post swimming careers ===
In 1913, Raymond C. Thorne was the Superintendent of the Purchasing department of the Montgomery Ward in Kansas City, which had 2,300 employees. When the company's founder Aaron Montgomery Ward died on December 7, 1913, the Kansas City office closed on the day of the funeral. Raymond had a relative George R. Thorne, who was an original partner and brother-in-law of Aaron Montgomery Ward when the company was first founded. Ray C. Thorne worked for Montgomery Ward for many years, but moved to the West Coast before his death in 1921.

In WWI, Thorne attended the School of Aerial Gunnery in New London, Connecticut, served with the Aviation Corps by 1917, and later served in the field of aviation.

Raymond Thorne's mother married wealthy heir William Carpenter Camp in 1919 in Los Angeles, California. After the death of Raymond Thorne's father William C. Thorne, Raymond's mother became heir to William Thorne's estate valued at $2,500,000.

=== Death ===
An automobile accident in Los Angeles on January 10, 1921, was the cause of Thorne's death at 33, when his new small car skidded and lost control on a wet street on Wilshire Boulevard. Thorne was a large stockholder in Montgomery, Ward, and Company. He was reported to have been driving fast, around midnight when his car lost control on an embankment. He was travelling to his very large newly built home in Beverley Hills, which he used in the winter months, when not residing in his home in Chicago. He was survived by his widow Mamie Thorne, who was in their home in Chicago, though she normally accompanied him on his winter trips to Southern California.

Services for Mr. Thorne were held at 2 PM on January 15, at the Chapel of Rosehill Cemetery. He was buried at Rosehill Cemetery after services were conducted, and was survived by his widow Mayme Wood, his mother William C. Camp, his brother Gordon and a sister.

== See also ==
- List of Olympic medalists in swimming (men)
