= John Meyers (swimmer) =

American swimmer (1880–1975)

Personal information
- Full name: Edward John C. Meyers
- National team: United States
- Born: June 28, 1880 Cincinnati, Ohio
- Died: 25 July 1975 (aged 95) Volusia, Florida
- Occupations: Contractor, machinist

Sport
- Sport: Swimming
- Strokes: Freestyle, water polo
- Club: Missouri Athletic Club (MAC)
- Coach: Alex Meffert (MAC)
Medal record
Men's water polo
Representing the United States
Bronze medal – third place	1904 St. Louis	Water polo

Edward John Meyers (June 28, 1880 – February 1975) was an American freestyle swimmer and water polo player for the Missouri Athletic Club who won a bronze medal for the U.S. in the 1904 Summer Olympics in St. Louis, Missouri.

Meyers trained and competed with the Missouri Athletic Club (MAC). Alex Meffert was the club's swimming director, and coached and trained the swimmers and water polo players who attended the 1904 Olympics. Meffert advocated the somewhat new, but now traditional crawl stroke, with the body aligned parallel to the bottom of the pool, and a single breath taken after a left and right arm stroke cycle, but generally advocated a single two-beat kick per stroke cycle. While he worked with the members of the New York Athletic Club before the Olympics in July and part of August, 1904, the Missouri Club was trained by Assistant Coach and Instructor Pete Rodgers, and team Captain Billy Orthwein, a Yale graduate and future lawyer. Meffert had been the regular coach, and returned to train the Missouri club's swimmers and water polo players in late August, 1904.

== 1904 Olympics ==
In the 1904 Olympics, Meyers won a bronze medal as a member of the Missouri Athletic Club water polo team. Meyer's Missouri Athletic Club Team lost to the first place gold medal team from the New York Athletic Club 5-0 in the semi-final round. The silver medal team, the Chicago Athletic Association lost to the New York Athletic Club team in the final round 6-0. He was registered to swim the 880-yard freestyle at the Olympics swim, but did not compete.

In addition to Meyers, the Missouri Athletic Club's (MAC) 1904 Olympic water polo team included Amedee Reyburn, Gwynne Evans, Augustus Goessling, Bill Orthwein, Frank Schreiner, and Manfred Toeppen.

On the morning of Monday, September 5, Meyers competed in one-mile freestyle at the St. Louis Olympics, but did not finish the competition. German swimmer Emille Rausch took the gold with a time of 25:44. The Hungarian Geza Kiss was favored to win the event, and placed second. Frank Gaily of the U.S. Olympic Club of San Francisco took the bronze for third. Meyers was accomplished as a distance swimmer, and had completed several prior distance swims.

=== Later careers ===
In July 1908, Meyers managed a Natatorium and athletic auditorium that could be used for both swimming and water polo and was scheduled to reopen on Grand and Cook Avenues in St. Louis. In 1906, he helped arrange a National Meet at Laughlin Lake, and had been instrumental in and organizing a ten mile swim in the Mississippi. As an administrator, he attempted to bring the American Athletic Union Swimming Championships to the new St. Louis Natatorium. In later life, Meyers was employed as a contractor and machinist. He died in Volusia, Florida on July 25, 1975.
