= Frank Kehoe =

American diver (1882–1949)

- Kehoe around 1906 with the CAA team, in CAA jersey

Personal information
- Full name: Frank Henry Kehoe
- National team: U.S.A
- Born: February 8, 1882 Chicago, Illinois, United States
- Died: December 26, 1949 (aged 67) Jacksonville, Illinois, United States
- Spouse: Nelly Foley

Sport
- Sport: Swimming, water polo, diving
- Position: Right forward (water polo)
- Club: Chicago Athletic Association (CAA)
- Coached by: Jack Robinson (water polo, CAA) Alex Meffert (CAA, post 1907)
Medal record
Representing the United States
Olympic Games
Men's springboard diving
| Bronze medal – third place | 1904 St. Louis | Platform |
Men's water polo
| Silver medal – second place | 1904 St. Louis | Water polo |

Frank Henry Kehoe (February 8, 1882 – December 26, 1949) was an American diver swimmer, and water polo player, who trained and competed for the Chicago Athletic Club. Representing the United States in 1904 at the St. Louis Olympics, Kehoe won a bronze medal in the diving competition and a silver medal in the water polo competition.

Kehoe was born February 8, 1882, in Chicago, Illinois. He competed and trained from his teen years for the Chicago Athletic Club where one of his primary coaches was John Robinson, who was particularly skilled coaching water polo. At the age of 16, Kehoe was scheduled to compete in a swimming, and water polo match for the William Hale Thompson Water Polo Cup to be held July 23, 1898, between Chicago's Hyde Park High School and the Chicago Athletic Association Junior team.

In February, 1902, Kehoe played right forward, representing a Naval Reserve team, and scored two goals against the Homestead Library Athletic Club in the first game of a Chicago area Interstate Championship. Kehoe's Naval Reserve team won the match 8–1. Representing the Chicago Athletic Association, on April 16, 1904, Kehoe was later scheduled to swim in Milwaukee's Central AAU Regional Indoor Swimming Championships in the 100-yard open, and the 440-yard open.

== 1904 St. Louis Olympics ==
At the age of 22, Kehoe represented the United States at the September, 1904 Summer Olympics in St. Louis, where he won a bronze medal in the springboard diving competition and a silver medal in the water polo competition.

=== Bronze diving medal ===
In the 1904 Olympic diving competition, Kehoe's results were initially a tie with German diver Alfred Braunschweiger for third place. Braunschweiger declined to participate in another round of diving to determine the winner, and as a result Kehoe received the third place bronze medal. A protest by the German team was initially overruled by the judges, but in 1906, the result provided by the Olympic committee was a tie between Kehoe and Braunschweiger for the bronze, and third place.

=== Silver water polo medal ===
All of the participants in the 1904 Olympic water polo competition were American club teams, with no teams from foreign countries. The New York Athletic Club team #1 took the gold medal under the leadership of Louis Handley, with the Missouri Athletic Club taking the bronze. No foreign teams competed that year. The New York Athletic Club dominated, winning the Semi-final match against the Missouri Athletic Club 5–0. In the finals, the New York Athletic Club Team 1 played Steever's Chicago Athletic Club, winning decisively with a 6–0 score. In 1904, in addition to Kehoe, the Chicago Athletic Association water polo team usually included 1904 Olympian William J. "Bill" Tuttle, J. Schreiner, Rex Beach, David Hammond, and 1904 Olympian Hugo Goetz, though Goetz did not play for the CAA team in the 1904 Olympics. CAA water polo team Captain Dave Hammond was a skilled forward in water polo, often responsible for critical goals.

Kehoe also placed fourth in an 880-yard handicap swim at the 1904 Olympics which was primarily for exhibition, and was a non-medal event.

In February, 1907, Kehoe served as the water polo team captain when twelve members of the Chicago Athletic Association planned a series of swimming and water polo matches against college teams and athletic clubs in the Eastern United States. Kehoe was to be a part of the water polo competition, and was not scheduled to compete in swimming events. The University of Pennsylvania, Princeton University, and the New York Athletic Club were scheduled for meets. By 1907, the swimming director at the Chicago Athletic Club was Alex Meffert, who worked with Kehoe and the water polo team to improve their swimming speed, tactics and strategy.

In 1907, Kehoe was nominated to replace Alex Meffert as swimming coach for the Missouri Athletic Club. Kehoe remained in Chicago, however, and continued to play for the Chicago Athletic Association team through 1911.

In March, 1921, Kehoe was recognized for rescuing Mrs. R. Hanthorn who had jumped into the cold waters of the Dearborn Street Bridge in greater Chicago. A large crowd witnessed the rescue. Kehoe was assisted by the bridge tender Fred Honet, a friend he was visiting, who took a small rowboat to pick up Hanthorn and Kehoe.

He died December 26, 1949, in Jacksonville, Illinois, 200 miles south of Chicago. A memorial service was conducted on Friday, December 30, at St. Barbara's Church in Brookfield, Illinois, a western suburb of Chicago. Kehoe was survived by his wife Nelly Foley, and two brothers, and was buried at St. Joseph Cemetery in Rivergrove, Illinois, just west of Chicago.
