= Stewart Home & School =

Location
- 4200 Lawrenceburg Road; Frankfort, Kentucky 40601; Franklin County, Kentucky

Information
- School type: Residential
- Established: 1893
- Director: Dr. Kara Davies
- Website: stewarthome.com

- Stewart Home School
- U.S. National Register of Historic Places
- U.S. Historic district
- Location within Kentucky Location within the United States
- Nearest city: Frankfort, Kentucky
- Coordinates: 38°7′35″N 84°54′28″W
- Area: 850 acres (340 ha)
- Built: 1840
- Architectural style: Greek Revival, Italianate
- NRHP reference No.: 76000884
- Added to NRHP: June 03, 1976

Stewart Home & School, previously called Stewart Home School, is a residential school in Franklin County, Kentucky serving individuals with intellectual or developmental disabilities. The school was established by Dr. John Q. A. Stewart in 1893 on the former site of Kentucky Military Institute on Lawrenceburg Road, five miles southeast of Frankfort. The school has been in continuous operation by five generations of the Stewart family, and was placed on the United States National Register of Historic Places June 3, 1976.
