= Glendy B. Arnold =

American lawyer

Glendy Burke Arnold (1875–1955) was an attorney and judge in St. Louis, Missouri, in the early 20th century.

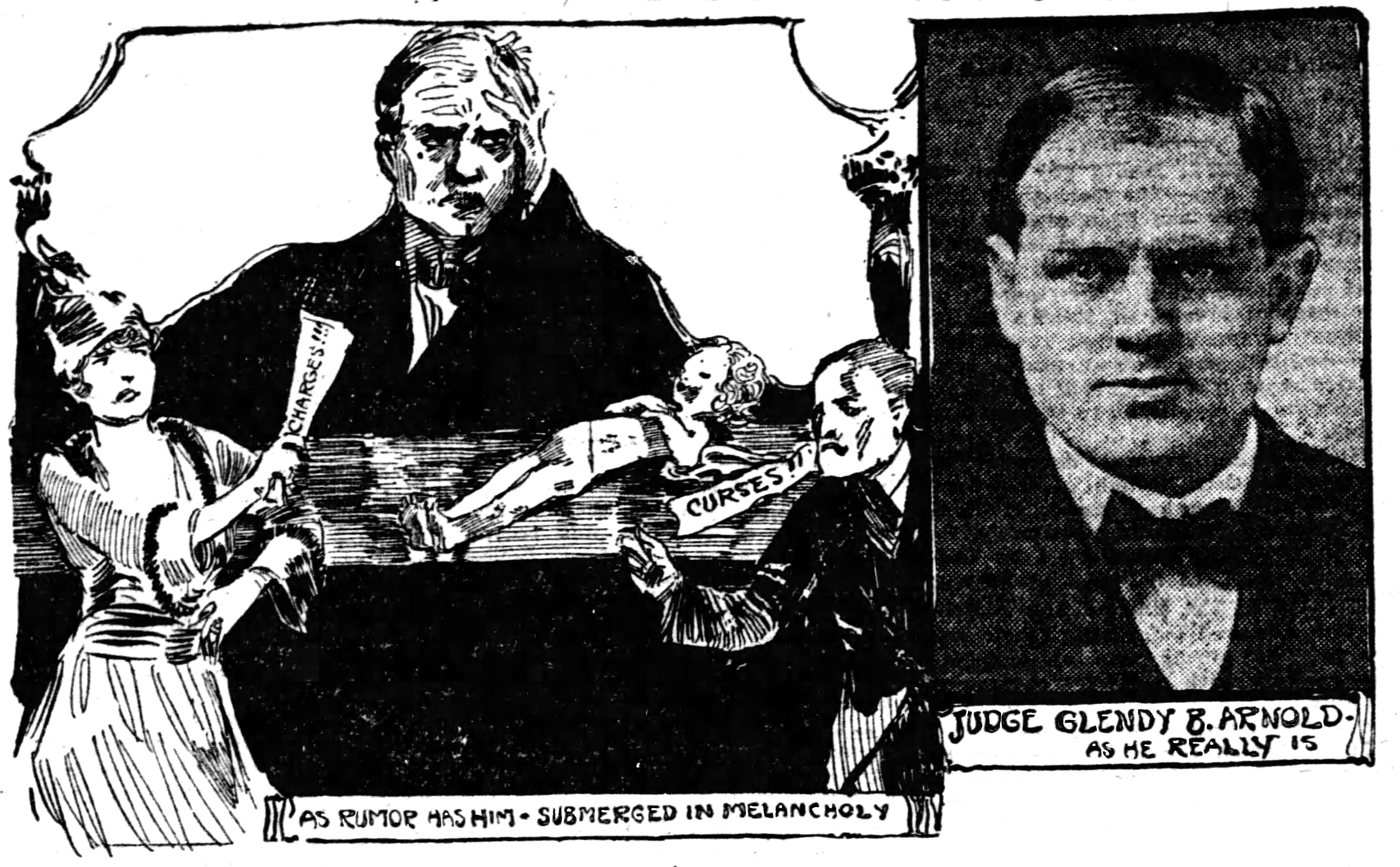
Left, an imaginative drawing by Marguerite Martyn of Judge Arnold in his divorce court with disputing litigants and their child as a supine doll in front of him. Right, a photograph of the judge

== Personal ==
Arnold was born January 30, 1875, in Frankfort, Kentucky, his father being Christian minister T.N. Arnold. The younger Arnold attended public and private schools in Frankfort, the Kentucky Military Institute and then studied law at Washington University School of Law, entering private practice in 1901.

He was married in 1907 to Cora Connett of St. Joseph, Mo., who died in 1950. They had no children.

He was elected president of the Missouri Athletic Association in March 1930.

He died on February 25, 1955, after a short illness.

== Career ==
Arnold was engaged in private practice with the firm of Boyle & Priest but left on November 1, 1909, because he felt the firm had favored a candidate for the Democratic nomination for district attorney, for which Arnold's brother-in-law, William C. Connett, was also campaigning.

Active in Democratic politics, he was an assistant circuit attorney in 1913-14 and a candidate for circuit judge in 1914. The next year he was named circuit judge by Governor Elliot Woolfolk Major to fill a vacancy.

He was an unsuccessful candidate for the Missouri Supreme Court in 1915, and he was chairman of the Board of Election Commissioners from 1918 to 1921.

In 1916 he was associated with the United Railways Company of St. Louis, and 1926 he was general counsel for the St. Louis Chamber of Commerce. In that year also he was active in a drive to exchange the uses of the Eads Bridge with the Municipal Bridge, putting railroads on the former and ending vehicular tolls on the latter.

Arnold, as chairman of the St Louis Election Board, was attacked by ex-Governor Joseph W. Folk in July 1918 for what Folk said was his activity on behalf of Folk's opponent for the Democratic nomination for senator, Xenophon P. Wilfley.

Arnold proposed to the Missouri State Legislature in 1919 that voter registration be made permanent instead of expiring every four years.

He was chairman of The Missouri Bar in 1922.

Arnold was elected a probate judge in 1934 and put into effect rules to provide additional safeguards for estates under his jurisdiction. He was re-elected in 1938 and remained in office until February 1954, when he retired.

=== Divorce court ===
In Arnold's first year as a divorce court judge, he was interviewed in December 1915 by St. Louis Post-Dispatch writer and illustrator Marguerite Martyn. He denied a rumor that he was depressed by his work but offered his opinion that the divorce courts "are farce, a joke," adding:

No, I don’t mean the cases. They are for the most part just disgusting and revolting. I am ashamed of the laws that govern our procedures. Why, the divorce court is a school for perjury. You will hear more perjury in one divorce suit than in any other dozen civil cases!

He advocated divorces that could simply be granted if the opposing party did not object.
