= Gwynne Evans =

American swimmer

- Evans around 1904, as pole vaulter with the MAC

Personal information
- National team: United States
- Born: September 3, 1880 St. Louis, Missouri, U.S.
- Died: January 12, 1965 (aged 84) St. Louis, Missouri, U.S.
- Spouse: Eugenie Shields
- Children: Julia Durkee, Mary Louise, Eugenie

Sport
- Sport: Swimming
- Strokes: Freestyle, water polo Short Distance Track
- Club: Missouri Athletic Club (MAC)
- Coach: Alex Meffert (MAC) (1903-1907)
Medal record
Representing the United States
Olympic Games
Men's swimming
Bronze medal – third place	1904 St. Louis	4x50 yd freestyle
Men's water polo
Bronze medal – third place	1904 St. Louis	Water polo

Gwynne Evans (September 3, 1880 – January 12, 1965), an American track athlete, competition swimmer and water-polo player, represented the United States at the 1904 Summer Olympics in his native St. Louis, capturing two bronze medals, one in the 4x50 freestyle relay, and one in water polo. He later served as President of St. Louis's David G. Evans Coffee Company from 1917 to 1946, a business passed to him after the death of his father.

== Early life and family ==
Evans was born September 3, 1900, in St. Louis, the second of three brothers to father David Gwynne Evans and mother Julia Durkee Evans. He attended Smith Academy, a boys' school founded in 1854, where he held the school record in the Pole Vault. His older brother Dwight was a resident of Milton, Massachusetts, and a 1901 Harvard graduate who participated in crew and hockey. Dwight worked 20 years for the Dwinnel Wright Company, a tea buyer. His younger brother Raymond died of diphtheria at age six in 1893. Gwynne grew up on 2648 Locust Street in midtown St. Louis on the same street as the original location of the Dwight Evans Coffee Company. His South Wales-born father David G. Evans, who first came to St. Louis in 1858 from Milwaukee, started the Flint-Evans Company, a successful partnership that served as a coffee roaster, packager, and distributor in St. Louis. By 1904, Evans owned a ranch in Wyoming, though he remained a St. Louis resident.

== Track achievements ==
Evans, in August 1904 with Missouri Athletic Club Jersey

A multi-sport athlete, acting as a Captain of the St. Louis Amateur Athletic Union, at 20 Evans performed tryouts for an October exposition, running the best time of the tryouts with a 16 4/5 seconds for the 150 yard course in September, 1900. In short track competition, he won the 50-yard dash in 5 2/5 seconds at the track exposition at the Colliseum in St. Louis on October 20, 1900. He won the 220-yard dash in 25 4/5 seconds. Evans planned to play with the St. Louis Medico Football team against St. Louis University undergraduates and alumni in the Fall of 1900. Evans also excelled as a pole vaulter and participated in the high jump and hurdles, in addition to his short-distance track achievements. As captain of the MAC Track Team, he participated in the 50-yard dash at a meet at St. Louis University on March 26, 1904, as well as the high jump and pole vault.

Alex Meffert was the Missouri Athletic Club's swimming director and coached Evans in both water polo and swimming from their opening in 1903 through 1907, when he accepted a position with the Chicago Athletic Club. and coached and trained the swimmers and water polo players who attended the 1904 Olympics. Meffert advocated a traditional crawl stroke, with the body aligned parallel to the bottom of the pool, and a single breath taken after a left and right arm stroke cycle, but generally advocated a single two-beat kick per stroke cycle. While he worked with the members of the New York Athletic Club before the Olympics in July and part of August, 1904, the Missouri Club was trained by Assistant Coach and Instructor Pete Rodgers, and team Captain Billy Orthwein, a Yale graduate and future lawyer. Meffert had been the regular coach, and returned to train the Missouri club's swimmers and water polo players in late August, 1904.

Shortly before the September, 1904 Olympics in late July, Evans was assessed by his Missouri Club coach Meffert as a speedy swimmer in short distances, but needing more focus and practice in his turns to cut his times in distance swims.

== 1904 St. Louis Olympic bronzes ==
Evans, 1904 in diving pose with Missouri Athletic Club Swim Jersey

=== 4x50 yard relay bronze medal ===
On September 7, at the 1904 Olympics in St. Louis, Missouri, Evans won a bronze medal as a member of the third-place American team in the 4x50-yard freestyle relay. Missouri Athletic Club members Amedee Reyburn swam as the lead swimmer of the relay, with Evans swimming second, Marquard Schwarz third, and Bill Orthwein swimming last as anchor. A protest was lodged by the Americans when a German 4x50 relay team attempted to enter the 4x50-yard relay event, as the American team believed that the Germans had created an "All-star" team and were not all the members of a single club. The American protest was upheld. All three of the 4x50 relay teams that medalled were from American Clubs, with the New York Athletic Club #1 taking the gold for first place, the Chicago Athletic Association taking the silver for second place, and Evans' Missouri Athletic Club taking the Bronze for third place. The New York Athletic Club #2 took fourth place and were out of medal contention.

=== Water polo bronze medal ===
The prior day on September 6, 1904, Evans won a bronze medal as a member of the third-place Missouri Athletic Club team in the Olympic water-polo tournament. Besides Evans, the Missouri Athletic Club's full water polo team included Amedee Reyburn, Gus Goessling, John Meyers, Bill Orthwein, Frank Schreiner, and Manfred Toeppen. Evans's Missouri Athletic Club Team lost to the first place gold medal team from the New York Athletic Club 5–0 in the semi-final round. The silver medal team, the Chicago Athletic Association lost to the New York Athletic Club team in the final round 6–0.

Following the Olympics, around October 1905 in St. Louis, Evans married Eugenie Shields, a St. Louis resident, beginning a long marriage.

== President, D. G. Evans Coffee ==
From 1917 to 1946, Evans served as President of the David G. Evans Coffee Company which he renamed after his father's death in May 1916. Gwynne Evans moved the company to 704-706 North N. Second Street, purchasing the building. Gwynne's father David started in the Coffee business with Nathan Flint in Milwaukee, Wisconsin. The company was formerly known as the Flint-Evans Company when it was first established in St. Louis as a partnership between J.G. Flint and father David G. Evans until the Evans family bought out J.G. Flint's interest. Evans was a company executive when they began manufacturing the Old Judge Coffee as their primary brand in St. Louis around 1858. They also sold teas, spices, and a few other food items. The company used mostly Brazilian beans that were imported first to New Orleans and then shipped via barge up the Mississippi. In 1964, Old Judge Coffee was bought by Chock Full o'Nuts, a better known New York brand.

In 1933, Evans competed in Handball, winning a championship match with Sylvester McKenna, defeating a team of two in a pairs tournament at the Missouri Athletic Association.

In 1939 Evans was elected a Director of the Industrial Bank. In 1947, he worked as the St. Louis Cardinals director for a brief period when the club was purchased by Robert Hannegan.

Evans died January 12, 1965, at his home at 4 North Kingshighway Blvd. in St. Louis, a large multi-residence structure built around 1908. He was survived by his wife of sixty year, Eugenie Shields Evans, and by three daughters, and numerous grandchildren and great-grandchildren. Services were held on 2:00 pm January 14 at the Arthur Donnelly parlors, and he was buried in the family plot at St. Louis's historic Bellefontaine Cemetery. Evans's estate was valued at $3,800,000, invested primarily in stocks, with a small amount in bonds. A 1957 will specified his three daughters and surviving spouse Eugenie as primary heirs to his estate. Four trust funds were divided between his widow, and three surviving daughters.

Evans was a member of the Missouri Athletic Club, Racquet Club, and the Nantucket Yacht Club of Nantucket, Massachusetts. North Kingshighway, where Evans resided, is an old historic North South Highway that runs through the Western half of downtown St. Louis and adjoins five city parks, historic buildings, and many neighborhoods.

== See also ==
- List of athletes with Olympic medals in different disciplines
- List of Olympic medalists in swimming (men)
