= Swimming at the 1904 Summer Olympics – Men's 4 × 50 yard freestyle relay =

Men's 4 × 50 yard freestyle relay at the Games of the III Olympiad
- Venue: Forest Park
- Date: September 7
- Competitors: 16 from 1 nation

Medalists
1st place, gold medalist(s)		United States; Charles Daniels, Leo Goodwin, Louis Handley, Joe Ruddy
2nd place, silver medalist(s)		United States; Hugo Goetz, David Hammond, Raymond Thorne, Bill Tuttle
3rd place, bronze medalist(s)		United States; Gwynne Evans, Bill Orthwein, Amedee Reyburn, Marquard Schwarz

The men's 4 × 50 yard freestyle relay was a swimming event held as part of the Swimming at the 1904 Summer Olympics programme. It was the first time any relay event was held at the Olympics. It was the only time yards were used instead of metres, and the only time the 50 was used as a distance rather than the 100 or 200 metre legs that were common.

4 teams of 4 swimmers each competed.

== Results ==
=== Final ===
Rank	Nation	Team	Swimmers	Time
1st place, gold medalist(s)	United States	New York Athletic Club	Joe Ruddy; Leo Goodwin; Louis Handley; Charles Daniels	2:04.6
2nd place, silver medalist(s)	United States	Chicago Athletic Association	David Hammond; Bill Tuttle; Hugo Goetz; Raymond Thorne	Unknown
3rd place, bronze medalist(s)	United States	Missouri Athletic Club	Amedee Reyburn; Gwynne Evans; Marquard Schwarz; William R. Orthwein	Unknown
4	United States	New York Athletic Club	Edgar Adams; David Bratton; George van Cleaf; David Hesser	Unknown

== Sources ==
- De Wael, Herman (2000). "Herman's Full Olympians".
