= Kentucky Military Institute =

Preparatory school in Lyndon, Kentucky, US

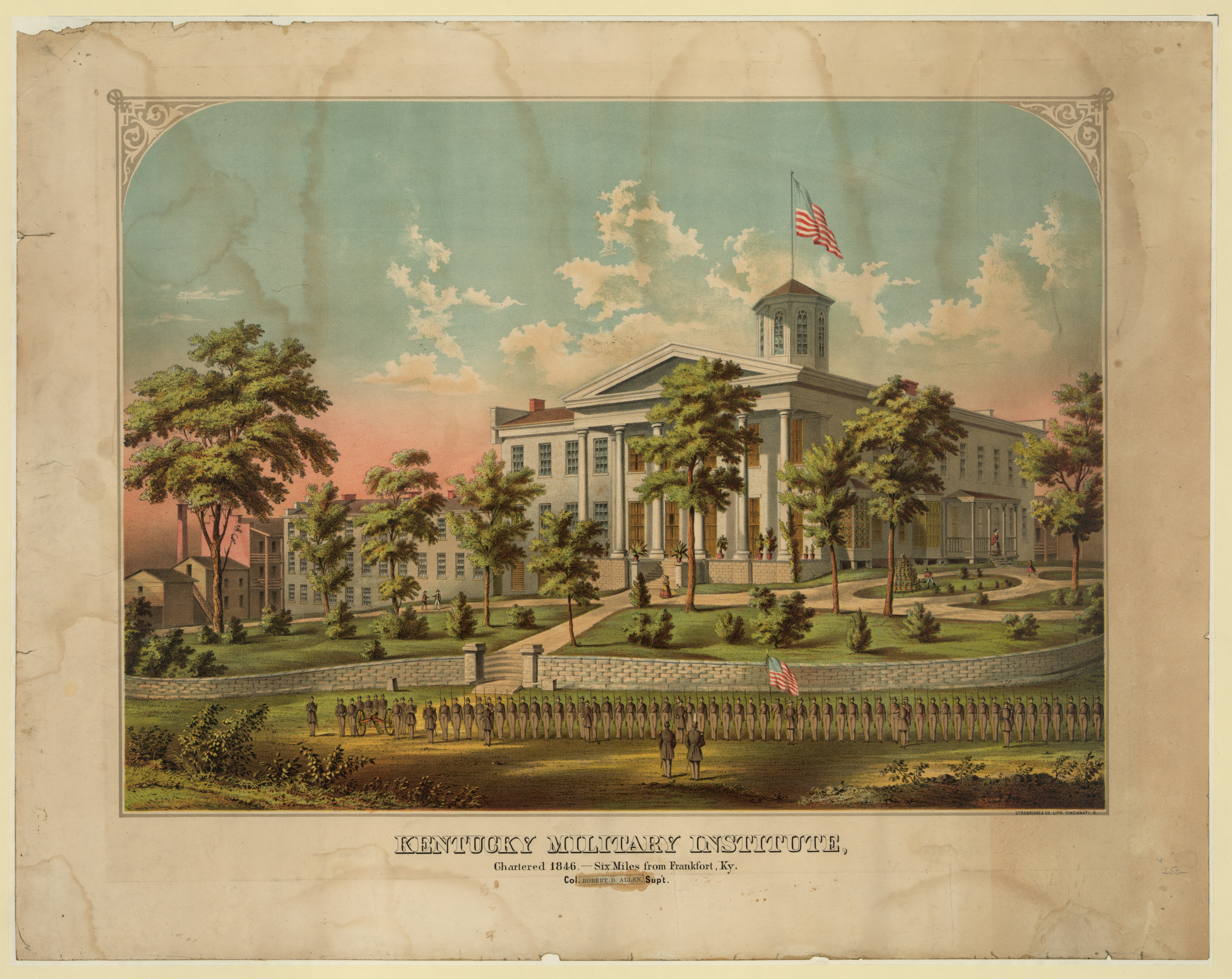
Kentucky Military Institute

The Kentucky Military Institute (KMI) was a military preparatory school in Lyndon, Kentucky, and Venice, Florida, in operation from 1845 to 1971.

== Founding ==
One of the oldest traditional military prep schools in the United States, KMI was maintained in the vein of the Virginia Military Institute, in that all of its students were classified as cadets. It was founded in 1845 by Colonel Robert Thomas Pritchard Allen (September 26, 1813, to July 9, 1888) and chartered by the Commonwealth of Kentucky in 1847.

== History ==
In 1860, as the Civil War approached, a student set the buildings on fire. The campus was partially destroyed and the Superintendent's residence was consumed. During the Civil War, the school remained closed.

KMI wintered in Eau Gallie, Florida, beginning in 1907 (when it bought that ghost town) to 1921 (when the Eau Gallie campus burned to the ground).

Due to financial troubles, the Florida campus moved many times in the late 19th and early 20th centuries, and was closed in 1924; it reopened the next year. It moved to Venice, Florida, in 1932, where winter classes were already being held. Charles B. Richmond was appointed as superintendent and the school thrived until the late 1960s.

== Closure ==
The main campus in Lyndon, Kentucky, which was located on the outskirts of Louisville, Kentucky, began its decline when dwindling interest in enrolling in the military, coupled with higher tuition fees, caused the school further financial trouble. Its final class of cadets graduated in 1971, and closed for good that summer.

The campus re-opened the next year as the Kentucky Academy and became a non-military co-ed school. However, it was soon merged into Kentucky Country Day School. The old campus was then used since 1893 by the Stewart Home School.

== Notable alumni ==
- Glendy B. Arnold, St. Louis judge
- Jim Backus, actor; credits included Thurston Howell III on Gilligan's Island
- John Y. Brown Jr., Governor of Kentucky (attended)
- William Denis Brown III; lawyer, businessman, state senator from Monroe, Louisiana; attended from 1948 to 1949
- Stephen Gano Burbridge, Union Army major general
- John Thomas Copenhaver Jr., federal judge
- Bruce Hoblitzell, mayor of Louisville and sheriff of Jefferson County
- Robert Hoke, Confederate major general
- Robert A. McClure (Class of 1915), Chief of Psychological Warfare to General Eisenhower's Allied Forces in Europe during World War II; founder of U.S. Army Special Operations
- Victor Mature, actor; credits include Samson and Delilah, My Darling Clementine
- Wendell H. Meade, U.S. Representative from Kentucky
- Samuel Woodson Price, artist & soldier; Union Army major general
- Danny Sullivan, race car driver; winner of the 1985 Indianapolis 500
- Fred Willard (Class of 1951), actor; numerous television and film credits include Best in Show and This Is Spinal Tap
