= William R. Orthwein =

American swimmer (1881–1955)

Personal information
- Full name: William Robert Orthwein
- National team: United States
- Born: October 16, 1881 St. Louis, Missouri, U.S.
- Died: October 2, 1955 (aged 73) St. Louis, Missouri, U.S.
- Occupations: Lawyer, corporate executive, political aspirant
- Spouse: Nina Kent Baldwin
- Children: 3 sons

Sport
- Sport: Swimming
- Strokes: Backstroke, freestyle, water polo
- Club: Missouri Athletic Club
- College team: Yale University
Medal record
Representing the United States
Men's swimming
Bronze medal – third place	1904 St. Louis	4x50 yd freestyle relay
Men's Water Polo
Bronze medal – third place	1904 St. Louis	Team competition

William Robert Orthwein (October 16, 1881 – October 2, 1955) was an American sportsman, attorney, business executive and political activist. He was an Olympic bronze medalist in both water polo and the 4x50 freestyle swimming relay at the 1904 St. Louis Olympics.

== Early life ==
William Robert Orthwein was born on October 16, 1881, in St. Louis, Missouri to William David and Emily Helen Thummler. His father, William D. Orthwein, was a German-born grain merchant with a successful business. William R. Orthwein attended St. Louis's Smith Academy, a boys' school well known for quality academics, and the Peabody Elementary School.

He later graduated from Yale University where he captained both the water polo and swim teams, played on the baseball team, and excelled in golf and bowling. While at Yale in November 1902, he was arrested on charges of assaulting a ticket seller for a Yale-Harvard football game, and was assessed with a fine the following month.

== Athletic career ==
Orthwein swam for the Missouri Athletic Club, under Alex Meffert as swimming director, and had been a founder of the club. Meffert coached and trained the swimmers and water polo players who attended the 1904 Olympics. Meffert advocated a traditional crawl stroke, with the body aligned parallel to the bottom of the pool, and a single breath taken after a left and right arm stroke cycle, but generally advocated a single two-beat kick per stroke cycle. While he worked with the members of the New York Athletic Club before the Olympics in July and part of August, 1904, the Missouri Club was trained by Assistant Coach and Instructor Pete Rodgers, and Orthwein who served as team Captain. Meffert had been the regular coach, and returned to train the Missouri club's swimmers and water polo players in late August, 1904.

== 1904 St. Louis Olympics ==
Orthwein competed in the 1904 Summer Olympics as a freestyle and backstroke swimmer and compete for the Missouri Athletic Club's water polo team.

Among six contestants, all from Germany and the United States, Orthwein finished fourth in the 100-yard backstroke, with the German swimmers taking the top three places led by Walter Brack who swam a 1:16.8. The Germans dominated the back and breaststroke swimming events that year.

=== 4x50 yard freestyle bronze ===
On September 7, at the 1904 Olympics in St. Louis, Missouri, Evans won a bronze medal as a member of the third-place American team in the 4x50-yard freestyle relay. Missouri Athletic Club members Amedee Reyburn swam as the lead swimmer of the relay, with Evans swimming second, Marquard Schwarz third, and Orthwein swimming last as anchor. A protest was lodged by the Americans when a German 4x50 relay team attempted to enter the 4x50-yard relay event, as the American team believed that the Germans had created an "All-star" team and were not all the members of a single club. The American protest was upheld. All three of the 4x50 relay teams that won medals were from American Clubs, with the New York Athletic Club #1 taking the gold for first place, the Chicago Athletic Association taking the silver for second place, and Orthwein's Missouri Athletic Club taking the Bronze for third place. The New York Athletic Club #2 took fourth place and were out of medal contention.

=== Water polo bronze medal ===
On September 6, 1904, Orthwein won a bronze medal as a member of the Missouri Athletic Club water polo team in the Olympic water-polo tournament. Besides Orthwein, the Missouri Athletic Club's 1904 water polo team included Amedee Reyburn, Gus Goessling, John Meyers, Gwynne Evans, Frank Schreiner, and Manfred Toeppen. Orthwein's Missouri Athletic Club Team lost to the first place gold medal team from the New York Athletic Club 5–0 in the semi-final round. The silver medal team, the Chicago Athletic Association, lost to the New York Athletic Club team in the final round 6–0.

== Professional career ==
Subsequent to graduating Yale, Orthwein received a law degree from the School of Law at Washington University in St. Louis.

Beginning in 1905, he began serving as a well-known attorney in St. Louis, eventually establishing a long practice on Chesnut Street. As a primary client, he was the vice president and general counsel for the Kinloch Telephone Company from 1916 to 1923. In that capacity, he refused to sell the business to the Bell Telephone Company. Turning to leadership roles in local politics, he counselled St. Louis Mayor William Dee Becker during Becker's period of mental illness from 1929 to 1933, when he served with the St. Louis Court of Appeals. In the 1930s Orthwein served in the reorganizing of five St. Louis Hotels as a trustee and aided in reorganizing Central Properties Corporation, the owner of the Missouri and Ambassador theatres.

During World War II, he served as a supply commissioner for the City of St. Louis, partly during the term of Mayor Becker, and was a prominent local member of the Republican Party. Aspiring to a high-profile role in public service in 1948, he ran unsuccessfully for lieutenant governor of Missouri. In 1950, he ran without success for St. Louis's City Collector of Revenue.

== Personal life ==
Orthwein married Nina Kent Baldwin. They had three sons, William R. Orthwein, Jr. of St. Louis, David K. Orthwein of San Francisco, and Robert B. Orthwein of Detroit.

== Death ==
Orthwein died at the age of 73 on October 2, 1955, at Barnes Hospital in St. Louis following an appendectomy. His funeral was at Second Presbyterian Church at 2:00 pm on October 4, and he was buried at the historical Bellefontaine Cemetery in St. Louis. In service to the community, Orthwein had served as a President of the St. Louis Lawyers Association, and had been a Secretary of St. Louis's Legal Aid Society, then part of the Bar Association.

== See also ==
- List of athletes with Olympic medals in different disciplines
- List of Olympic medalists in swimming (men)
