= Frank Schreiner =

American water polo player (1879–1937)

Personal information
- Full name: Francis Louis Schreiner
- Born: March 24, 1879 St. Louis, Missouri, United States
- Died: July 6, 1937 (aged 58) Chicago, Illinois, United States
- Occupations: Grain broker and merchant Member, Chicago Board of Trade
- Spouse: Genevieve Whitlock Schreiner

Sport
- Sport: Swimming, Water polo
- Position: Goalkeeper By 1906
- Club: Missouri Athletic Club (MAC)
- Coached by: Alexander Meffert (MAC)

Frank "Francis" Louis Schreiner (March 24, 1879 – July 6, 1937) was an American swimmer and water polo player who competed and trained with the Missouri Athletic Club. He competed in the men's tournament at the 1904 Summer Olympics, and was part of the team that won the bronze medal. He later served as a grain merchant, was a member and Director of the Chicago Board of Trade, and was the owner of Schreiner Grain Company.

Schreiner was born March 24, 1879 in St. Louis Missouri, to father Jacob Schreiner, and was one of five siblings. He competed in both swimming and water polo for the Missouri Athletic Club. At the Missouri Club, he was coached in swimming and water polo by Coach Alex Meffert, who served with the Missouri Athletic Club from 1903-1907, before accepting a position with the Chicago Athletic Club.

== 1904 St. Louis Olympic bronze ==
At the 1904 St. Louis Olympics, only three American water polo teams, and no foreign teams competed. Schreiner was a member of the Missouri Athletic Club water polo team that won the bronze medal in the event, with the team from the New York Athletic Club taking the Gold and the team from the Chicago Athletic Club taking the silver. In addition to Schreiner, the Missouri Club water polo team consisted of Gwynne Evans, Augustus Goessling, John Myers, Bill Orthwein, Amedee Reyburn, and Manfred Toeppen. The Missouri Athletic Club (MAC) team went scoreless, losing 5-0 in their match against the New York Athletic Club, but as only three teams competed, the Missouri Athletic Club won the third place bronze medal.

The 1904 Olympic water polo competition was part of the 1904 St. Louis World’s Fair, and was held at the Life Saving Exhibition Lake on September 5-6. The New York Athletic Club that won the gold medal consisted of David Bratton, George Van Cleaf, Leo Goodwin, Louis Handley, Joe Ruddy, and James Steen. The lake used for the life saving exhibition and water polo tournament was part of the agricultural exhibit, and some of the cattle from the agricultural exhibit walked into the lake. Although swimming and water polo were held in a different part of the lake, within a year of the competition, four of the water polo competitors were the fatal victims of typhus.

=== Post-Olympic competition ===
In 1906, Schreiner completed a five mile race representing the Missouri Athletic Club from the Mound City Rowing Club on Madison Street to the Cherokee Rowing club on Cherokee Street. In 1906, the swimming instructor at the Missouri Athletic Club remained Alex Meffert. In a game between the Missouri Athletic Club and the New York Athletic Club on March 24, 1906, Schreiner played as goalkeeper, making a number of important saves, but his Missouri Athletic Club team fell to the New York Athletic Club's stronger players by a score of 6-1.

=== Career ===
His obituary with the Chicago Tribune of August 3, 1907, notes that he was a grain merchant and served as a member of the Chicago Board of Trade, beginning in 1908, later ascending to the role of Director by election. During his career, he was the owner of the Schreiner Grain Company.

At the age of 58, Francis L. Schreiner died of pneumonia at the Illinois Central Hospital on July 6, 1937 in Chicago, Illinois. Services were held on the afternoon of July 9th at his place of residence at the Plaisance Hotel on 60th Street in Chicago. He was buried at St. Mary Catholic Cemetery, in greater Chicago's Evergreen Park, and was survived by his wife Genevieve Whitlock Schreiner of New York, and a daughter Margaret, a Chicago resident.
