= Culver Hastedt =

American sprinter (1884–1966)

Culver Lucias Hastedt
Personal information
- Nickname: King of the Handicaps
- Born: 17 October 1883 St. Louis, Missouri
- Died: 2 November 1966 (aged 83) St. Louis, Missouri

Sport
- Sport: Track and field
- Events: Sprints, broad jump
- College team: Christian Brothers College
- Club: Missouri Athletic Club
Medal record
Men's athletics
Representing the United States
Event	1st	2nd	3rd
1904 Summer Olympics Handicap Games	4	1	0
Total	4	1	0
Olympic Games
Gold medal – first place	1904 Summer Olympics	Men's 100-yard dash
Gold medal – first place	1904 Summer Olympics	Men's 60-yard dash
Gold medal – first place	1904 Summer Olympics Olympic Open Handicap	Men's 100-yard dash
Silver medal – second place	1904 Summer Olympics Olympic Open Handicap	Running Broad Jump
Gold medal – first place	1904 Summer Olympics WAAAU	Running Broad Jump

Culver Lucias Hastedt (October 16, 1884 – November 2, 1966) was an American sprinter and Olympic gold medalist in 1904. In total, he won five Olympic medals for track and field competition in the first American Olympics and the first Olympics held outside of Europe. Since he was an amateur athlete and as part of the newly founded [[Missouri Athletic Club]], he received the label of amateur "handicap" at the time, which in no way referred to his physical ability, nor his achievement of competitive awards. However, for his five wins as an amateur, he was known as "The King of the Handicaps," winning gold medals in the 60-yard dash, the 100-yard dash and the running broad jump at the 1904 Summer Olympics in St. Louis, Missouri. Also, in the Olympic Open Meet, he won the 100-yard dash and won second place in the broad jump.

In the 1904 Olympic Games, "handicap" did not refer to any type of physical impairment at that time. Instead, these were events in which some athletes, mostly amateurs, were given a slight advantage in position or location. These matches were track and field events that allowed lesser athletes the opportunity to compete head-to-head with superior professional Olympic competitors. In this era, a "handicap" winner is similar to an amateur winner of a professional event. His victory in the 100-yard dash was the first won by a St. Louis athlete. The 1904 Olympics were also significant in that they were the first Olympics to be held in the United States.

"One of the most successful athletes to participate in the Olympic events was St. Louis native Culver Hastedt. The speedy representative of the Missouri Athletic Club won both the 60- and the 100-yard dashes held during the week of the official Olympic games. Hastedt also won the 100-yard dash in the Olympic Open Handicap Meet, running for Christian Brothers College. His versatility showed by taking second in the running broad jump at the same event. At these same Olympic Games during the Western Association AAU handicap Meet, Hastedt won the gold medal for the running broad jump. For all his efforts, he was dubbed 'King of the Handicaps'."

— Jim Greensfelder, Jim Lally, Bob Christianson and Max Storm, 1904 Olympic Games Official Medals and Badges
