= Augustus Goessling =

American swimmer (1878–1963)

Personal information
- Full name: Augustus Michael Goessling
- Nickname: "Gus"
- National team: United States
- Born: November 17, 1878
- Died: August 22, 1963 (aged 84) St. Louis, Missouri
- Spouse: Nellie Sauers Goessling

Sport
- Sport: Swimming
- Strokes: Backstroke, Breaststroke; Water Polo
- Club: Missouri Athletic Club (MAC)
- Coach: Alex Meffert (MAC) (1903-1907)
Medal record
Men's water polo
Representing the United States
Olympic Games
| Bronze medal – third place | 1904 St. Louis | Team competition |

Augustus Michael "Gus" Goessling (November 17, 1878 – August 22, 1963), usually known as "Gus", was an American water polo player, and breaststroke and backstroke swimmer who represented the United States at the 1904 St. Louis and 1908 London Summer Olympics.

== Early life and athletics ==
Augustus Michael Goessling was born into a family of three brothers and a sister on November 17, 1878, to Mr. and Mrs. August Goessling. During his athletic career, he held the National breaststroke and backstroke championships. He was a highly accomplished cyclist, and rowed with some of the outstanding crew teams of the Century Boat Club.

In late June, 1893, Goessling received the honorary certificate for completing the commercial course at the 64th Commencement exercises of St. Louis University held at the Olympic Theatre.

Goessling trained and competed in both swimming and water polo with the local Missouri Athletic Club (MAC) under Alexander Meffert. Meffert was the club's swimming director, and coached and trained both swimmers and water polo players from the club's opening in 1903 through 1907, when he accepted a position with the Chicago Athletic Club. who attended the 1904 Olympics. Meffert advocated the somewhat new, but now traditional crawl stroke, with the body aligned parallel to the bottom of the pool, and a single breath taken after a left and right arm stroke cycle, but generally advocated a single two-beat kick per stroke cycle. While he worked with the members of the New York Athletic Club before the Olympics in July and part of August, 1904, the Missouri Club was trained by Assistant Coach and Instructor Pete Rodgers, and team Captain Billy Orthwein, a Yale graduate and future lawyer. Meffert had been the regular coach, and returned to train the Missouri club's swimmers and water polo players in late August, 1904.

== 1904, 1908 Olympics ==
On September 6, 1904, Goessling won a bronze medal as a member of the third-place Missouri Athletic Club team in the Olympic water-polo tournament. Besides Goessling, the Missouri Athletic Club's (MAC) 1904 water polo team included Amedee Reyburn, Gwynne Evans, John Meyers, Bill Orthwein, Frank Schreiner, and Manfred Toeppen. Alex Meffert was the Missouri Athletic Club's swimming director and coached Evans in both water polo and swimming from their opening in 1903 through 1907, when he accepted a position with the Chicago Athletic Club.

Four years later Goessling was eliminated in the first round of the mid-July 100-meter backstroke, at the 1908 London Olympics, as well as in the first round of the 200-meter breaststroke.

== American AAU records ==
Prior to the 1908 Olympics, at the National Amateur Athletic Union Championship at the Chicago Athletic Association in Chicago, Illinois, on March 18, 1908, Goessling set a record of 2:46.4 for the Men's Senior 200-yard breaststroke, which improved on both the American and World Record. He also set a new American record in the 150-yard backstroke with a time of 2:00.2.

Competing with the Missouri Athletic Club (MAC) at their Cherry Diamond Tank pool on February 7, 1914, in a local meet where M.A.C. placed second to the Chicago Athletic Association, Goessling won the 200-yard breaststroke in a noteworthy time of 2:52.2. He had won the event three weeks earlier in a meet against the Illinois Athletic Club with a time of 2:52.4.

== Later life ==
Goessling worked as a wholesale farmer and then as an Executive of the National Paper Company. He was a co-founder of St. Louis's Century Boat Club. He was married to Nellie Saurs Goessling who predeceased him.

Goessling died at the age of 84 on August 22, 1963, at Deaconess Hospital, in St. Louis and was buried at St. Louis's Calvary Cemetery and Mausoleum. He was survived by his brother Valentine and his sister Isabelle. His wife Nellie Sauer Goessling had died the prior year, in November, 1962. A Funeral and Mass for Goessling were held on the morning of August 24, 1963, at the Church of the Annunciation in St. Louis. A success in both his worklife and investments, shortly after his death his estate was valued at $267,186.
