= Bill Tuttle (swimmer) =

American swimmer (1882–1930)

- Tuttle at the 1904 St. Louis Olympics

Personal information
- Full name: William Jeremiah Tuttle
- Nickname: W.J.
- National team: United States
- Born: February 21, 1882 Chicago, Illinois, U.S.
- Died: February 22, 1930 (aged 48) Los Angeles, California, U.S.

Sport
- Sport: Swimming
- Strokes: Freestyle, water polo
- Club: Chicago Athletic Association (CAA)
- Coach: John Robinson (CAA)
Medal record
Representing the United States
Olympic Games
Men's swimming
Silver medal – second place	1904 St. Louis	4x50 yd freestyle
Men's water polo
Silver medal – second place	1904 St. Louis	Team competition

William Jeremiah Tuttle (February 21, 1882 – February 22, 1930) was an American freestyle swimmer and water polo player who represented the United States at the 1904 Summer Olympics in St. Louis, Missouri.

William J. Tuttle, often appearing as W. J. Tuttle in newspapers and official documents, was born on February 21, 1882 to Mrs. Louise Jane Macklin Tuttle and Mr. W. Pierce Tuttle, who had served as a one-time President of the Chicago Board of Trade.

== Chicago Athletic Association ==
Representing the Chicago Athletic Association at the Central Association AAU Championship in Milwaukee, Wisconsin, on August 12, 1899, Bill Tuttle won the 80-yard novice race in a time of 1:01.4. William J. Tuttle represented the Naval Reserve team and the Chicago Athenaeum when he won the 40-yard distance on February 6, 1902 in a time of 23.6 seconds, eclipsing the American amateur record. By the age of 17, Tuttle swam for the Chicago Athletic Association swim team coached primarily by John Robinson through 1904. Robinson was credited by historians for being one of the first coaches to bring the game of Water Polo to the United States from England around 1888. Tuttle would also swim for Chicago Athletic Association's regionally dominant Water Polo team.

Representing the Chicago Athletic Association on November 9, 1903, Tuttle placed first in the finals of the 40-yard distance in a time of 21.4 seconds at the Chicago Sportsmen Show, which may have been a record if the pool had been measured at a full 40 yards, rather than around 37 yards. Tuttle competed against fellow CAA club member and fellow 1904 Olympian Raymond Thorne in the close race of four competitors.

Tuttle was entered in the 200m obstacle course and 200-meter freestyle in the (1900 Paris Olympics), but did not show for either event, and may have never been in Paris.

== 1904 St. Louis Olympics ==
In the 1904 Olympics at the St. Louis World's Fair, Tuttle won silver medals as a member of the U.S. 4x50-yard freestyle relay team and as a member of the Chicago Athletic Association water polo team. In the 4x50-yard freestyle, Tuttle swam with the American team of Dave Hammond, Hugo Goetz, and Raymond Thorne.

In the 1904 St. Louis Olympic water polo competition, on September 5-6, three American teams competed, with the New York Athletic Club taking first, and the Missouri Athletic Club taking third for the bronze medal. The New York Athletic Club dominated, winning the Semi-final match against the Missouri Athletic Club 5-0. In the finals, the New York Athletic Club played Tuttle's Chicago Athletic Club, winning decisively with a 6-0 score. In 1904, in addition to Tuttle, the Chicago Athletic Association water polo team usually consisted of 1904 Olympian Dave Hammond, J. Schreiner, Rex Beach, Jerome Steever, and 1904 Olympian Hugo Goetz. Hammond, 1904 team captain, was known as a skilled forward in Water Polo, often responsible for critical goal, and played Center in his later career, an important position for offensive scoring.

Tuttle died at his home in Beverly Hills, California, on Oakhurst Drive on February 22, 1930. He died somewhat unexpectedly after completing a round of golf at the Los Angeles Country Club where he was a member. He was survived by his widow Agnes Tuttle who had lived in Chicago and Paris. Tuttle was later buried in his family's section at the Rosehill Cemetery in Chicago.

== See also ==
- List of athletes with Olympic medals in different disciplines
- List of Olympic medalists in swimming (men)
