= Jerome Steever =

American water polo player (1880–1957)

- Steever at 24 with the Chicago Athletic Club at the 1904 St. Louis Olympics

Personal information
- Full name: Jerome Elwell Steever
- National team: U.S.A
- Born: January 7, 1880 Milwaukee, Wisconsin, United States
- Died: January 5, 1957 (aged 76) San Diego, California, United States
- Occupations: Trader, Chicago Board of Trade
- Spouse: Margaret Lyle Burns
- Children: 1

Sport
- Sport: Water polo, Freestyle swimming
- Position: left back (Water Polo)
- Club: Chicago Athletic Association (CAA)
- Coached by: John Robinson (CAA)
Medal record
Representing the United States
Olympic Games
Silver medal – second place	1904 St. Louis	Water Polo competition

Jerome Elwell Steever (January 7, 1880 – January 5, 1957) was an American water polo player who competed for the Chicago Athletic Association and represented the U.S. in the 1904 Summer Olympics in St. Louis, winning a silver medal in the Water Polo competition. He later worked as a trader for the Chicago Board of Trade.

== Early life and family ==
Jerome E. Steever was born January 7, 1880, in Milwaukee, Wisconsin, to Jerome G. Steever and Fannie M. Davlin. By 1895, the Steever's had moved to Chicago, Illinois. Jerome's father J.G. Steever served on the House and Membership Committees for the Chicago Athletic Association in January 1895, and campaigned for a Director position in 1896. A well-known member of Chicago society, Jerome E. Steever's father Jerome G. Steever was a Senior member of the firm J.G. Steever and Co. on Chicago's Van Buren Street. J.G. Steever served as a member of the Chicago Board of Trade for over 40 years and was a well known in Chicago society as a businessman in the provision trade. Future Olympian Jerome E. Steever became the only male heir to his father's name and his legacy as a Chicago trader, as he was born the only son in a family with three daughters as siblings.

=== Chicago Athletic Association ===
1904 silver medalist Jerome Elwell Steever was very frequently referenced in Chicago newspaper coverage and other media as J. E. Steever. As early as 1898, Steever played water polo for the Chicago Athletic Association Junior Team, where he was coached by John Robinson. Robinson, a Water Polo Hall of Fame member, was credited by many historians with first bringing the game of Water Polo to the United States in 1898. Steever also swam the occasional swim race for the Chicago Athletic Association, and was scheduled to compete in the 60-yard freestyle handicap event on April 13, 1898.

On April 16, 1904, Steever, who did not solely compete in Water Polo, particularly in his early swimming career, was scheduled to swim the 40, 60, and 100-yard events, as well as the 4x400 freestyle relay for the Chicago Athletic Club at the Central Association AAU Sectional Meet in Milwaukee, Wisconsin.

== 1904 St. Louis Olympics ==
In the 1904 Olympics, on September 5–6, Steever won a silver medal at the Water Polo competition as a member of the Chicago Athletic Association team. All of the participants in the water polo competition were American club teams, with no teams from foreign countries. The New York Athletic Club team #1 took the gold medal under the leadership of Louis Handley, with the Missouri Athletic Club taking the bronze. No foreign teams competed that year. The New York Athletic Club dominated, winning the Semi-final match against the Missouri Athletic Club 5–0. In the water polo finals, the New York Athletic Club Team 1 played Steever's Chicago Athletic Club, winning decisively with a 6–0 score. In 1904, in addition to Steever, the Chicago Athletic Association water polo team usually consisted of 1904 Olympian William J. "Bill" Tuttle, J. Schreiner, Rex Beach, David Hammond, and 1904 Olympian Hugo Goetz. Water polo teams generally consisted of seven players. CAA Water Polo team Captain Dave Hammond was known as a skilled forward in water polo, often responsible for critical goals.

=== Post olympic athletics ===
In 1905, Steever was slated to play left back in a local water polo meet against the Missouri Athletic Club at the Chicago Tank on March 25, 1905. Left backs played defense, and required fast moves and quick swimming to be effective. Also scheduled was fellow 1904 Olympic silver medalist Dave Hammond playing Center.

Continuing to occasionally compete in swimming events after the 1904 Olympics, Steever was scheduled to swim the 880-yard swim, and the 110-yard swim at the New Year's Open Handicap Meet on January 1, 1906, at Chicago's Central YMCA. In February, 1906, Steever was one of eleven Chicago Athletic Association athletes scheduled to attend the National Championships at the New York Athletic Club from February 21–24. At the National Championships, a water polo tournament was scheduled against the Missouri Athletic Club. Other competing teams included the New York Athletic Club, and teams from several Ivy League Colleges. In his later career, Steever was scheduled to play water polo for the Chicago Athletic Association in the Central Athletic Association Sectional tournament on March 11, 1908.

In his professional life, Steever, like his father, was a trader with the Chicago Board of Trade. A lengthy process, by May 1913, Steever had first made application for membership to the Chicago Board of Trade, and within ten years was a well-known trader.

Steever married Margaret Lyle Burns on July 27, 1910, in Colorado. The couple had a son Jerome Steever Jr., born on August 14, 1914. At the age of eight, Jerome Jr. died at on Wednesday, January 24, 1923, at St. Francis, Hospital, after he was struck by a car in the Chicago suburb of Evanston.

Steever died on January 5, 1957, in San Diego, California.
