= Manfred Toeppen =

American water polo player (1887–1968)

Manfred K. Toeppen
- Toeppen from team photo with Missouri Athletic Club Water Polo Team, circa 1909

Personal information
- Full name: Manfred Kurt Washington Toeppen
- National team: United States
- Born: September 3, 1887 St. Louis, Missouri, United States
- Died: July 18, 1968 (aged 80) Los Angeles, California, U.S.
- Education: Washington University; 1908 B.S. Electrical Engineering
- Occupation: Consulting Engineer (Utilities)
- Spouse: Alice Bornmueller
- Relatives: Hugo Toeppen, father

Sport
- Sport: Swimming, Water polo
- Position: Goaltender
- Club: Missouri Athletic Club (MAC)
- Coached by: Alex Meffert (MAC) 1903-7; John Robinson (MAC)
Medal record
Representing the United States
Olympic Games
Bronze medal – third place	1904 St. Louis	Team competition

Manfred Kurt Washington Toeppen (September 3, 1887 – July 18, 1968) was an American swimmer and water polo player who competed for the Missouri Athletic Club and participated in the 1904 St. Louis Olympics where he won a bronze medal in the water polo team competition. Graduating from Washington University with a B.S. in Electrical Engineering in June 1908, he retired from competitive swimming with the Missouri Club around 1912, and had a distinguished career as a consultant for public utilities, eventually serving as one of the Chief Engineers for the Federal Communications Commission.

== Family and early life ==
Manfred Kurt Toeppen was born September 3, 1887 in St. Louis, Missouri. From an athletic family, Manfred's younger brother Herwig was an accomplished gymnast and swimmer. His older sister Herta had completed an eleven-mile open water swim in the Illinois River in mid-1908, and in September, 1908 completed a ten-mile AAU National Swim that ended at Ead's Bridge on the Mississippi in St. Louis in just over two hours. Father Hugo Toeppen, who was born in Poland, then Prussia, competed in freestyle wrestling in the welterweight class at the 1904 Olympics in St. Louis at the age of 51, in a rare father-son pairing in the same Olympic year. As Dr. Hugo Toeppen, he worked as a physician in South St. Louis beginning around 1895, having formerly graduated the University of Leipzig with a Doctorate, and obtained his medical degree from Canada around 1892, likely from the University of Toronto.

Manfred's father Hugo competed for St. Louis's Concordia Turnverein, a gymnastics and sports club primarily composed of German-Americans, where he was active as both an athlete and administrator, holding various administrative roles, including the club Presidency. Accomplished in several sports, Hugo was an excellent horseman and swimmer, and in addition to his achievements in gymnastics and wrestling, won a silver cup in 1929 from the American Athletic Union's Western Division for his work furthering the sport of ice skating. Hugo relocated to California in the Riverside area around 1931 after his sight began failing, which may have influenced son Manfred to later relocate to California's greater Los Angeles area.

Around age 16, Manfred Toeppen began training with the Missouri Athletic Club in St. Louis in swimming and water polo beginning in 1903 where he was coached by Alex Meffert through 1907, when Meffert left the Missouri Club. Toeppen continued training in swimming and water polo with the Missouri Club through 1911-12.

== 1904 St. Louis Olympics ==
In the 1904 St. Louis Olympics, Toeppen was awarded a bronze medal in the men's water polo competition as a member of the Missouri Athletic Club water polo team. For about a year prior to the 1904 Olympics, he was coached in swimming and water polo with the Missouri Athletic Club under Coach and instructor Alex Meffert, who had previous experience coaching swimming and water polo at the Knickerbocker Athletic Club of New York. In July and part of August, 1904, while Meffert worked with the members of the New York Athletic Club before the Olympics, the Missouri Club's water polo team was trained by Assistant Coach and Instructor Pete Rodgers, and Bill Orthwein who served as the water polo team's Captain. Meffert had been the regular coach, and returned to train the Missouri club's aquatic players in late August, 1904. Meffert continued to coach the swimming and water polo team of the Missouri Athletic Club for a few years subsequent to 1904. Noted as a distance swimmer, Toeppen had originally been scheduled to swim a half mile handicap race at the St. Louis Olympics, but no records remain if the event took place.

The 1904 Olympic Water Polo contest was held at the 1904 St. Louis World's Fair on September 5–6, at the Life Saving Exhibition Lake. In Olympic competition, the Missouri Athletic Club water polo team placed third to the gold medal-winning team from America's New York Athletic Club, and the silver medal team from America's Chicago Athletic Association. Besides Toeppen, the Missouri Athletic Club's full water polo team included Gwynne Evans, Gus Goessling, John Meyers, Bill Orthwein, and Frank Schreiner. In the Water Polo tournaments first round, the New York Athletic Club team soundly defeated Toeppen's Missouri Athletic Club team by a score of 5–0 on September 5. In the final round, the New York Athletic Club defeated the Chicago Athletic Association Club by a score of 6–0 on September 6.

=== Continuing to compete for the Missouri Club ===
By late September, 1906, Toppen played as a goalkeeper for the Missouri Athletic Club, and was described as a large player who was crucial to the team's success. He continued to play goalkeeper for the team through around 1911, though not exclusively. It is not likely he played goalkeeper during the 1904 Olympics, as he was new to position for the Missouri team in late September 1906, subsequent to the Olympics.

A multi-stroke competitor, Toeppen took third place in a 150-yard backstroke event at the AAU National Indoor Swimming Championships at the New York Athletic Club in Mid-February 1906. In a game between the Missouri Athletic Club and the New York Athletic Club on March 24, 1906, the Missouri Athletic Club team fell to the New York Athletic Club's stronger players by a score of 6-1 with Toeppen scoring a goal and playing left forward.

Attempting distance open water swimming while representing the Missouri Athletic Club, Toeppen entered and finished the three and one-half mile swim in the Mississippi from Alton, Illinois to the Illini Yacht Club, in June, 1906, though he suffered afterward from setting a very fast pace.

=== Washington University ===
As Manfred Kurt Washington Toeppen, he attended Washington University in St. Louis, receiving a Bachelors of Science in Electrical Engineering in June, 1908, shortly before his 21st birthday. Toeppen competed in wrestling during his time at the University, and was described as "one of the best wrestlers at the University". He participated in a wrestling contest described as a wrestling championship of Washington University scheduled for March, 1906, and was also scheduled to compete in an intramural handball competition. It was noted that his weight in February, 1906 was around 170 pounds. Toeppen competed for Washington University's football team, and was scheduled to play in a football game for Washington on November 2, 1907, against highly favored St. Louis University, in the position of left guard, at a recorded weight of 185. With Washington University clearly outmatched, St. Louis won the game 78-0.

Toeppen retired from active participation as a competitive water polo player with the Missouri Athletic Club around October, 1910, but competed with the club sporadically as a swimmer and diver at least through 1912, though primarily in local club meets. Subsequent to 1907, Toeppen was coached for a period at the Missouri Athletic Club in water polo and swimming by Englishman John Robinson, a USA Water Polo Hall of Fame inductee. Toeppen was scheduled to compete in a meet sponsored by the Missouri Club at the Crystal Natatorium in a diving event in March, 1911.

=== Marriage ===
Toeppen was married to Alice (Bornmueller) Toeppen, receiving a marriage license in December 1912, according to St. Louis's German newspaper Amerika and the St. Louis Star. They had a child.

=== Engineering career ===
After obtaining an Electrical Engineering degree from Washington University, and ending his elite athletic career, he served as a consulting engineer with public utilities. Around 1925, Toeppen worked for the Commission for the Michigan State Public Utilities, testifying on regulations for rates and evaluating rates during hearings addressing regulations. Toeppen, appearing in print as Manfred K. Toeppen, worked with the Federal Communications Commission, beginning in 1935. In 1937, he was named head of the Communications Property Division.

By 1943, he was one of the chief engineer's of the FCC's Engineering Staff, with oversight responsibilities for broadcasting regulations. In 1954, working with the firm of Ford, Bacon and Davis, he consulted for New York City regarding challenges to telephone infrastructure, opposing rate increases proposed by the New York Telephone Company. New York City contended that rates should be established separately for themselves than for the rest of the state, and that rates should be set solely on a cost basis rather than the "value of service" theory proposed by the New York Telephone Company. Around the mid-50's Toeppen consulted for the Motion Picture Association in California, conducting a cost analysis of broadcasting movies on television which was submitted to the FCC. The study included suggested frequencies on which to broadcast. Around the mid-50's, Toeppen relocated to California.

Toeppen died in Los Angeles, California on July 18, 1968 at the age of 80.
