= David Hammond (swimmer) =

American swimmer (1881–1940)

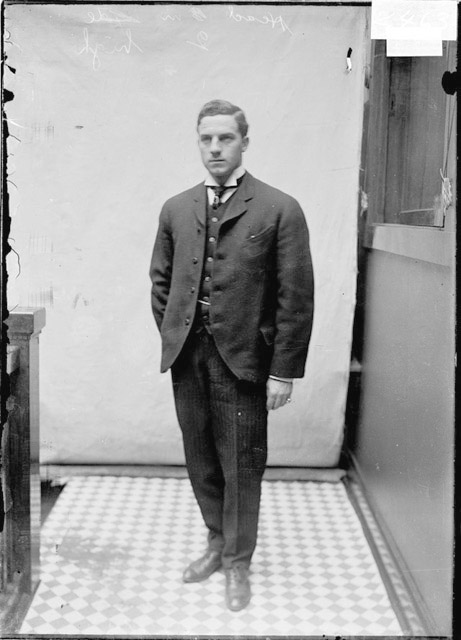
- Hammond, c. 1903

Personal information
- Full name: David Thurwell Hammond
- National team: United States
- Born: April 5, 1882 Chicago, Illinois, US
- Died: February 3, 1940 (aged 59) Miami, Florida, US
- Occupation: Broker
- Spouses: Dorothy Brenner (1912); Ethel Jane French (1923)

Sport
- Sport: Swimming
- Strokes: Backstroke, freestyle, water polo
- Club: Chicago Athletic Association (CAA)
- Coach: John Robinson (CAA)
Medal record
Representing the United States
Olympic Games
Men's swimming
Silver medal – second place	1904 St. Louis	4x50 yd freestyle
Men's water polo
Silver medal – second place	1904 St. Louis	Team competition

David Thurwell Hammond (April 5, 1882 – February 3, 1940) was an American freestyle swimmer and water polo player who competed for the Chicago Athletic Association and participated in the 1904 Summer Olympics, taking a silver medal in water polo, and a silver medal in the 4x50 yard freestyle relay. He later married and earned his living as a Chicago and New York area broker.

== Early life ==
David Thurwell Hammond, who went by "Dave" in most newspapers and documents, was born the younger of several siblings on April 5, 1882, in Chicago, Illinois to Thomas Cavan Hammond and Elizabeth Bell. Dave Hammond's father Thomas founded Chicago's American Hide and Leather Trust Company.

=== Chicago Athletic Association ===
By 1895, around the age of 12, Hammond participated in swimming as well as acrobatic and diving events for the Chicago Athletic Club under English-born swimming Coach John Robinson, who was credited by many with being one of the first coaches to bring the sport of water polo to the United States from England in 1888.

On February 21, 1895, Hammond won the 80-yard race at the Chicago Athletic Association tank with a time of 1:20. Distinguishing himself often in the 100-yard event at a Central Association Amateur Athletic Union meet on January 20, 1904, in Chicago, Hammond placed first in the 100-yard race in a time of 1:07. In a strong finish, he was followed by Harry Brooks of the Central YMCA, with C. Sanger taking third. On April 16, 1904, at the Central AAU meet in Milwaukee, Wisconsin, Hammond won the 60-yard swimming event in a time of 37.4.

In 1904, Hammond captained the Chicago Athletic Association (CAA) Water Polo Team coached by John Robinson. The game of water polo was first introduced in the U.S. in 1888, and followed rules similar to rugby and American football. It was a more violent game in the late 1800s when first introduced in the United States, and a goal could be scored by placing the ball against a wall. In a water polo game against Yale on April 6, 1904, at the Chicago pool, Hammond's Chicago team won with a score of 2–1. Hammond was temporarily removed from the game after a fight with Yale player J.B. Naething. At the same meet, Hammond again won the 80-yard freestyle event by a large margin.

== 1904 St. Louis Olympics ==
Chicago Athletic Club, 1904 Olympics, Hammond top row, far left

In the 1904 Olympics, Hammond won two silver medals as a member of the American 4x50 yard freestyle relay team and as a member of Chicago Athletic Association water polo team which he captained. In the 4x50-yard freestyle, he swam with the American team of Bill Tuttle, Hugo Goetz, and Raymond Thorne.

In the 1904 St. Louis Olympic water polo competition, on September 5–6, three American teams won medals, with the New York Athletic Club Team 1 taking first, the Chicago Athletic Association team taking the second place silver, and the Missouri Athletic Club taking third for the bronze medal. A second team from the Chicago Athletic Association took fourth and was eliminated. No foreign teams competed that year. The New York Athletic Club dominated, winning the Semi-final match against the Missouri Athletic Club 5–0. In the finals, the New York Athletic Club Team 1 played Dave Hammond's Chicago Athletic Club team, winning decisively with a 6–0 score. In 1904, in addition to Hammond, the Chicago Athletic Association water polo team usually consisted of 1904 Olympian William J. "Bill" Tuttle, J. Schreiner, Rex Beach, Jerome Steever, and 1904 Olympian Hugo Goetz. Hammond was known as a skilled forward in water polo, often responsible for critical goals.

In events where he did not medal, Hammond placed 5th in the 100-yard freestyle after qualifying in the finals, and placed third in the 200-yard handicap race, though he was not eligible for medals, as it was an exhibition event.

=== Later life ===
In 1912, Hammond was employed as a Chicago broker and officed in the Home Insurance Building.

On April 12, 1912, he married Dorothy Brenner, at the Grace M. E. Church. Brenner was an actress at Chicago's Palace Theatre, and had worked as an actress for about five years prior to the marriage. In Chicago, Hammond also owned and managed the Christian Theatre. By 1915, the couple were divorced, having lived together for only around six months, according to Brenner.

Hammond's draft registration card filed during WWI lists him as working with the Intelligence Department.

On March 22, 1923, Hammond married Ethel Jane French in Cook County, to whom he remained married throughout his life.

After an illness of two weeks, Hammond died on February 3, 1940, at his home in Miami, Florida. He had lived in Miami for about five years, formerly residing in New York City. In Miami, he had bred Perry Blue Dogs in his retirement.

== See also ==
- List of athletes with Olympic medals in different disciplines
- List of Olympic medalists in swimming (men)
