= Marquard Schwarz =

American swimmer

Mark Schwarz
Personal information
- Full name: Marquard J. Schwarz
- Nickname: "Mark"
- National team: United States
- Born: July 30, 1887 St. Louis, Missouri
- Died: February 17, 1968 (aged 80) Santa Monica, California

Sport
- Sport: Swimming
- Strokes: Freestyle
- Club: Missouri Athletic Club
- College team: Yale University
Medal record
Men's swimming
Representing the United States
Olympics
Bronze medal – third place	1904 St. Louis	4x50 yd freestyle

Marquard J. Schwarz (July 30, 1887 – February 17, 1968) was an American freestyle swimmer who won a bronze medal in the 1904 Summer Olympics in St. Louis and also competed in the 1906 Summer Olympics in Athens, Greece.

Schwarz was born July 30, 1887, in St. Louis Missouri and competed for the Missouri Athletic Club where his coaches included Tom Whileteer. His brother Fred was also a local swimmer for Missouri Athletic and in 1913 swam the 100-yard event in 59 seconds. Marquand later attended Yale University.

== Olympics ==
In the 1904 St. Louis Olympics, in his hometown, at the Life Saving Exhibition Lake at Forest Park, Schwarz won a bronze medal as a member of Missouri Athletic Club team in the 4x50 yard freestyle relay. There were no competitors outside the U.S. that made the finals. The American New York Athletic Club team won the gold medal, and the Chicago Athletic Club team won the silver.

In the 1906 Athens Olympics, known as the Intercalated Games, Schwarz came in seventh in the 100 meters freestyle and fourth as a member of the 4x250 meter freestyle relay team. In the 4x250 meter relay event, though the British team were initially the favorites, the Hungarian team placed first for the gold medal with a combined time of 16:52.4, and the German team placed second for the silver.

After the Olympics, Schwarz moved to California.

Schwartz died in Santa Monica, California on February 17, 1968, and was survived by a brother, Fred of St. Louis, Missouri. Marquand was predeceased by his wife Corrine Restock in 1966. He was buried in St. Louis's Belefontaine Cemetery as was his wife Corrine Restock Schwarz.

== See also ==
- List of Olympic medalists in swimming (men)
