= Hugo Goetz =

American swimmer

- Goetz at the 1904 St. Louis Olympics in CAA Jersey

Personal information
- Full name: Hugo Louis Goetz
- National team: United States
- Born: October 18, 1884 Chicago, Illinois, U.S.
- Died: April 4, 1972 (aged 87) Foley, Alabama, U.S.
- Education: Armour Institute

Sport
- Sport: Swimming
- Strokes: Freestyle
- Club: Chicago Athletic Association (CAA)
- Coach: John Robinson (CAA)
Medal record
Men's swimming
Representing the United States
Olympic Games
Silver medal – second place	1904 St. Louis	4x50 yd freestyle

Hugo Louis Goetz (October 18, 1884 – April 4, 1972) was an American competition swimmer who represented the United States at the 1904 Summer Olympics in St. Louis, Missouri. He later worked as a realtor in Chicago.

== Early life and swimming ==
Goetz was born in Chicago on October 18, 1884, to Mr. and Mrs. Fritz Goetz.

At the Central AAU Championship held in Chicago on January 20, 1904, Goetz was part of the highly competitive Chicago Athletic Union team that won the Senior 4x60-yard relay.

On April 6, 1904, while swimming for the Chicago Athletic Association (CAA), the CAA team soundly defeated the Intercollegiate Championship team of Yale University capturing every event. Goetz placed third in the 40-yard swim, and second in the 60-yard swim. The CAA's greatest rival at the meet was the Central YMCA of Chicago.

Goetz trained with the very strong Chicago Athletic Association swim team that included swimmers David Hammond, W. J. Tuttle, J. Schreiner, Rex Beach, and Jerome Steever. The Chicago Athletic Association team was primarily coached by John Robinson through 1904, who also coached water polo at the Chicago Club. Goetz was not part of the silver medal water polo team for the Chicago Athletic Club at the 1904 Olympics, however.

More known as a top swimming competitor, Goetz occasionally played with the Chicago Athletic Association water polo team, but specialized in swimming events.

== 1904 Olympic silver ==
At the age of 19 at the 1904 St. Louis Olympics, while representing the Chicago Athletic Association, Goetz won a silver medal as a member of the second-place U.S. 4x50-yard freestyle relay team. A highly rated team from the New York Athletic Club easily won the competition with a time of 2:04.6. Louis Handley, a future swim coach for the Women's Swimming Association of New York, and Joe Ruddy swam for the NYAC team. A German team was not allowed to compete in the relay after the Americans protested that the German team were all stars and not from one club.

In 1905, Goetz attended Chicago's Armour Institute. Founded by Frank Wakely Gunsaulus, the school later merged with Lewis Institute to become the Illinois Institute of Technology.

Charles Goetz's Olympic experience and attainment of the silver medal demonstrated his work ethic and commitment to swimming. He continued to contribute to the swimming community after retiring from competition, passing on his knowledge to other swimmers.

== Later life ==
Goetz was engaged to Marie Louise Guerin in September 1908, and married on November 8, 1908, at the Hotel Julien with immediate family in attendance. Guerin had been a Chicago resident since 1903, when she moved with her family from Ottawa.

By 1919, Goetz was president of the Para Auto Company, and was the owner of a 9-story Apartment building at 3400 Sheridan Road in Chicago. In September 1931, Goetz was sentenced to three years in the penitentiary for concealing assets of around 247,000 in bankruptcy, and the U.S. Supreme Court refused to review the case in October 1932. Goetz later returned to his Chicago career as a realtor.

By 1963, Goetz resided in Foley, Alabama, where he served as a director of the Magnolia Springs Volunteer Fire Department.

Goetz died on April 4, 1972, and was buried in Pine Crest Cemetery in the town of Foley in Baldwin, County, Alabama. His wife Louise Guerin Goetz was buried with him in 1975.

== See also ==
- List of Olympic medalists in swimming (men)
