= Missouri Athletic Club =

American private club

Coordinates: 38.629965°N 90.187165°W

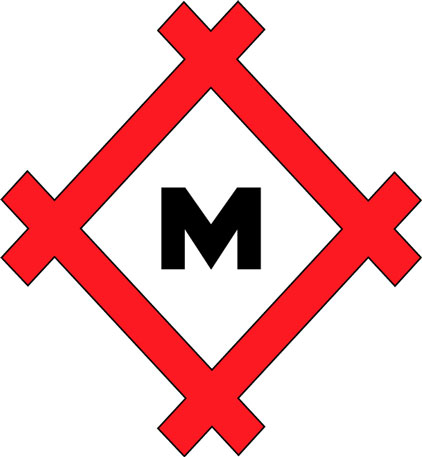
- Genre: Athletic club Social club
- Founded: St. Louis, Missouri, 1903
- Headquarters: St. Louis, Missouri
- Website: www.mac-stl.org

The Missouri Athletic Club (often referred to as the MAC), founded in 1903, is a private city and athletic club with two locations. The Downtown Clubhouse is in Downtown St. Louis, Missouri, and the West Clubhouse is located in the suburb of Town and Country.

The MAC awards the annual Hermann Trophy, the highest award in American college soccer, and the Jack Buck Award in recognition of enthusiastic and dedicated support of sports in the city of St. Louis. Notable members have included President Harry S. Truman, Charles Lindbergh, Stan Musial, and Alan Shepard. The American Legion was organized there in 1919. Membership was restricted to white men until the late 1960s and men until 1988.

== Facilities ==
=== Downtown Clubhouse ===
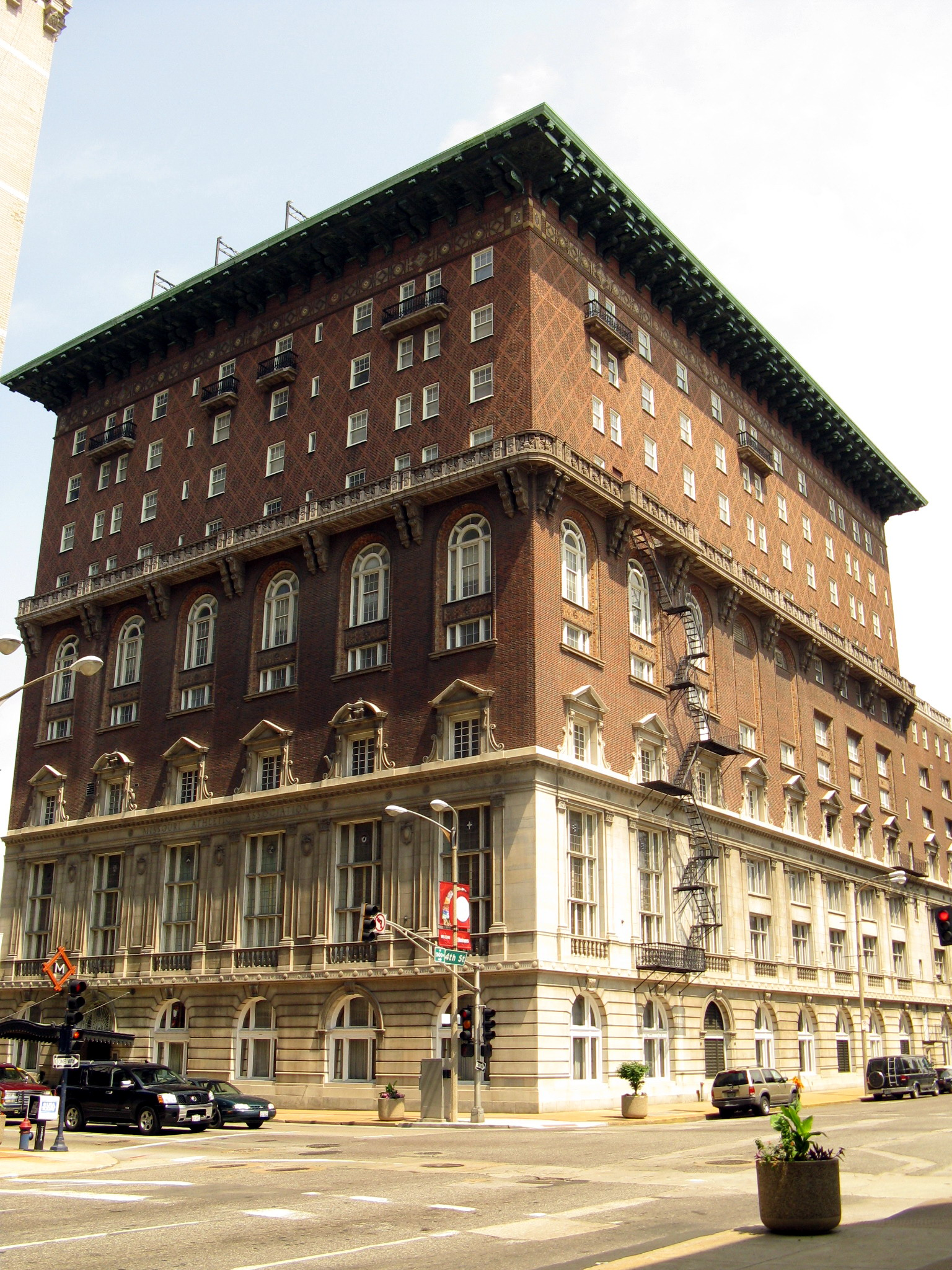
Missouri Athletic Club's Downtown Clubhouse

The Missouri Athletic Club opened on September 13, 1903 in the Boatman's Bank Building at 4th Street and Washington Ave. in downtown St. Louis. Founder Charles Henry Genslinger had opened clubs in New Orleans and New York.

A fire destroyed the original clubhouse in March 1914. Within two weeks, a committee was appointed to design and erect a new and more elaborate clubhouse on the same location. The project was funded with bonds sold to prominent St. Louis businessmen, including August A. Busch.

Designed by William B. Ittner, the present-day Downtown Clubhouse opened on March 1, 1916, with a gala celebration attended by 5,000 people. The 10-story facility was grander than the original, with contains two restaurants, a ballroom, a barber shop, numerous private meeting rooms, a reading room, a billiard parlor, a rooftop deck, more than 75 guest rooms, and full-service athletic facilities. The athletic facilities include weight training, a pro shop, whirlpools, tanning beds, saunas, trainers, pros, a masseuse, squash courts, racquetball courts, and handball courts.

The Missouri Athletic Club has renovated and expanded its West Clubhouse numerous times over the years. Some of the largest projects took place in 1998, 2004, and 2016.

=== West Clubhouse ===
In 1995, the Missouri Athletic Club purchased the Town and Country Racquet Club, which was built in 1975, and opened it as the MAC's West Clubhouse on June 16 of the same year.

The facility, with more than 178,000 square feet of space, has a 25-meter outdoor swim and dive pool, two restaurants and bars, private event spaces, eight indoor tennis courts, squash courts, racquetball courts, a basketball court and gymnasium, and a fitness center.

== History ==
Entrepreneur Charles Henry Genslinger came to St. Louis in 1903, during the lead-up to the 1904 Louisiana Purchase Exposition. Having organized amateur athletic and social clubs in New York City and New Orleans, he persuaded local prominent citizens to fund a similar club. Boatmen's Bank donated a seven-story building at Fourth Street and Washington Avenue to the Club, which adopted Missouri Athletic Club as its name. More than 3,200 members enrolled before the club opened in September 1903.

Upon its founding, the MAC joined the Amateur Athletic Union, which allowed its members to participate in the 1904 Summer Olympics, also held in St. Louis. As part of the AAU, the MAC formed basketball, swimming, track, baseball, boxing, wrestling, bowling, and billiards teams which competed throughout the United States.

In 1904, Culver Hastedt represented the Missouri Athletic Club in the Olympic Games held in St. Louis, Missouri, and won four gold medals and two silver medals.

In 1914, the MAC's clubhouse was destroyed by a fire that killed 30 members, guests, and staff. The club constructed a building in its place, which opened in 1916. This has been the clubhouse ever since. From 1916 to 1939, the MAC was renamed the Missouri Athletic Association.

In 1943, the Missouri Athletic Club Apollos (often referred to as the MAC Apollos) were founded, making them the MAC's oldest "Club within the Club".

In the late 1960s, the all-white, all-male club voted to allow Black men to join.

In 1987, the MAC began awarding the Hermann Trophy to the United States's top male and female college soccer players. This award is the highest recognition for players in college soccer.

In 1988, the club's members voted overwhelmingly to admit female members. The vote came after John C. Shepherd, whose membership in the all-male MAC and the all-white Bellerive Country Club had drawn national scrutiny and criticism, withdrew from his nomination to be Attorney General Edwin Meese III's deputy at the U.S. Justice Department.

In 1995, the MAC bought the Town and Country Racquet Club in West St. Louis County. The club spent $2 million to upgrade the facilities and reopened them as the Missouri Athletic Club's West Clubhouse. The West Clubhouse was re-renovated for $8 million in 2003.

In 2006, St. Louis Magazine reported "The Missouri Athletic Club, one of the largest clubs in the country, lost cachet after admitting first women and then anybody who could pay."

== Notable members ==
- Glendy B. Arnold, St. Louis judge
- Jack Buck, St. Louis Cardinals sportscaster
- Jimmy Dunn, American soccer player
- Gwynne Evans, American Olympic athlete
- Joseph Forshaw, Olympic marathon runner
- Augustus Goessling, American Olympic athlete
- Charles F. Haanel, American businessman and author
- Sidney Hatch, American Olympic athlete
- Charles Lindbergh, pioneer aviator
- John Meyers, American Olympic athlete
- Stan Musial, St. Louis Cardinals baseball player, Baseball Hall of Fame inductee
- William Orthwein, American Olympic athlete
- Marquard Schwarz, American Olympic athlete
- Albert Schweitzer, cartoonist for the St. Louis Post-Dispatch; served as art director of Missouri Athletic Club
- Alan Shepard, astronaut, first American in space
- Harry A. Slattery, United States Deputy Secretary of the Interior (1917–18), author of the Slattery Report
- Manfred Toeppen, American Olympic athlete
- Harry S. Truman, 33rd president of the United States (1945-1953)
- Jackie Joyner-Kersee, American Olympic athlete
