= 1846 in science =

The year 1846 in science and technology involved some significant events, listed below.

== Astronomy ==
- February 20 – Francesco de Vico discovers comet 122P/de Vico.
- June 1 – Urbain Le Verrier predicts the existence and location of Neptune from irregularities in the orbit of Uranus.
- August 8 – Neptune observed but not recognised by James Challis.
- August 31 – Urbain Le Verrier publishes full details of the predicted orbit and the mass of the new planet.
- September 23 – Johann Galle discovers Neptune.
- October 10 – William Lassell discovers Triton, Neptune's largest moon.

== Biology ==
- Royal Botanic Gardens, Melbourne, established in Australia.

== Chemistry ==
- Abraham Pineo Gesner develops a process to refine a liquid fuel, which he calls kerosene, from coal, bitumen or oil shale.

== Mathematics ==
- Augustin-Louis Cauchy publishes Green's theorem.
- James Clerk Maxwell's first scientific paper describes a mechanical means of drawing mathematical curves with a piece of twine, and the properties of ellipses, Cartesian ovals and related curves with more than two foci. It has to be read on his behalf to the Royal Society of Edinburgh as he is a 14-year-old schoolboy at this time.

== Medicine ==
- October 16 – Dentist William T. G. Morton becomes the first person publicly to demonstrate the use of diethyl ether as a general anesthetic in what becomes known as the Ether Dome of Massachusetts General Hospital.
- December 21 – British surgeon Robert Liston carries out the first operation under anesthesia in Europe.
- Édouard Séguin publishes Traitement moral, hygiène et éducation des idiots et des autres enfants arriérés in Paris, the earliest systematic textbook dealing with the special needs of children with developmental disabilities; his views will be influential on both sides of the Atlantic.
- Dr J. Collis Browne formulates his laudanum-based pain-relieving Chlorodyne compound while serving in the British Indian Army.

== Technology ==

- January 13 – Opening of the Milan–Venice railway's 3.2 km (2.0 mi) bridge over the Venetian Lagoon between Mestre and Venice in Italy, the world's longest since 1151.
- June 28 – Adolphe Sax patents the saxophone.
- September 10 – Elias Howe is awarded the first United States patent for a sewing machine using a lockstitch design.
- Scottish-born engineer Robert William Thomson is granted his first patent for a pneumatic tyre, in France.
- William Armstrong's first hydraulic crane is erected at Newcastle upon Tyne in England.
- Squire Whipple introduces the trapezoidal Whipple truss for bridges in the United States.

== Awards ==
- Copley Medal: Urbain Le Verrier
- Wollaston Medal: William Lonsdale

== Births ==
- February 10 – Ira Remsen (died 1927), American chemist.
- March 1 – Vasily Dokuchaev (died 1903), Russian geologist.
- September 16 – Anna Kingsford (died 1888), English physician, anti-vivisectionist and vegetarian.
- October 3 – Samuel Jean de Pozzi (murdered 1918), French gynaecologist.
- December 12 – Eugen Baumann (died 1896), German chemist.
- December 21 (O.S. 2 January 1847) – Julia Lermontova (died 1919), Russian chemist.

== Deaths ==
- January 30 – Joseph Carpue (born 1764) English surgeon.
- March 9 – Julien-Joseph Virey (died 1775), French anthropologist, naturalist and physician.
- March 17 – Friedrich Bessel (born 1784), German mathematician.
- August 6 – John Bostock (born 1773), English physician and geologist (died of cholera).
- October 2 – Benjamin Waterhouse (born 1754), American physician.
- Maria Medina Coeli (born 1764), Italian physician.
