= 1764 in science =

The year 1764 in science and technology involved some significant events.

== Astronomy ==
- Lagrange publishes on the libration of the Moon, and an explanation as to why the same face is always turned to the Earth, a problem which he treats with the aid of virtual work, containing the germ of his idea of generalized equations of motion.

== Physics ==
- Specific and latent heats are described by Joseph Black.

== Technology ==
- The spinning jenny, a multi-spool spinning wheel, is invented by James Hargreaves in Stanhill, near Blackburn, Lancashire, England.

== Awards ==
- Copley Medal: John Canton

== Births ==
- Early – James Smithson, British mineralogist, chemist and benefactor (died 1829)
- April 3 – John Abernethy, English surgeon (died 1831)
- May 4 – Joseph Carpue, English surgeon (died 1846)
- September 17 – John Goodricke, English astronomer (died 1786)
- October – William Symington, Scottish mechanical engineer and steamboat pioneer (died 1831)
- November 10 – Andrés Manuel del Río, Spanish chemist (died 1849)
- Maria Medina Coeli, Italian physician (died 1846)
- Approx. date – Alexander Mackenzie, Scottish explorer (died 1820)

== Deaths ==
- March 17
  - William Oliver, English physician (born 1695)
  - George Parker, 2nd Earl of Macclesfield, English astronomer (born c. 1696)
- September 2 – Rev. Nathaniel Bliss, English Astronomer Royal (born 1700)
- November 20 – Christian Goldbach, Prussian mathematician (born 1690)
