= Diving at the 1904 Summer Olympics =

Diving at the Games of the III Olympiad
- Venue: Forest Park (U.S. Life Saving Exhibition Lake)
- Dates: 5 September 1904 through 6 September 1904
- No. of events: 2
- Competitors: 10 from 2 nations

At the 1904 Summer Olympics, in St. Louis, diving debuted as an official two-event Olympic sport. The competitions were held on Monday, 5 September 1904 and on Wednesday, 6 September 1904. It included the only Olympic appearance of the plunge for distance event.

== Medal summary ==
Event	Gold	Silver	Bronze
Platform	George Sheldon; United States	Georg Hoffmann; Germany	Frank Kehoe; United States
Plunge for distance	William Paul Dickey; United States	Edgar Adams; United States	Leo Budd Goodwin; United States

== Participating nations ==
A total of ten divers from two nations competed at the St. Louis Games:

- Germany (3)
- United States (7)

== Medal table ==
Rank	Nation	Gold	Silver	Bronze	Total
1	United States	2	1	2	5
2	Germany	0	1	0	1
Totals (2 entries)		2	2	2	6

== Sources ==
- "Olympic Medal Winners". International Olympic Committee.
