= Diving at the 1904 Summer Olympics – Plunge for distance =

Men's platform diving at the Games of the III Olympiad
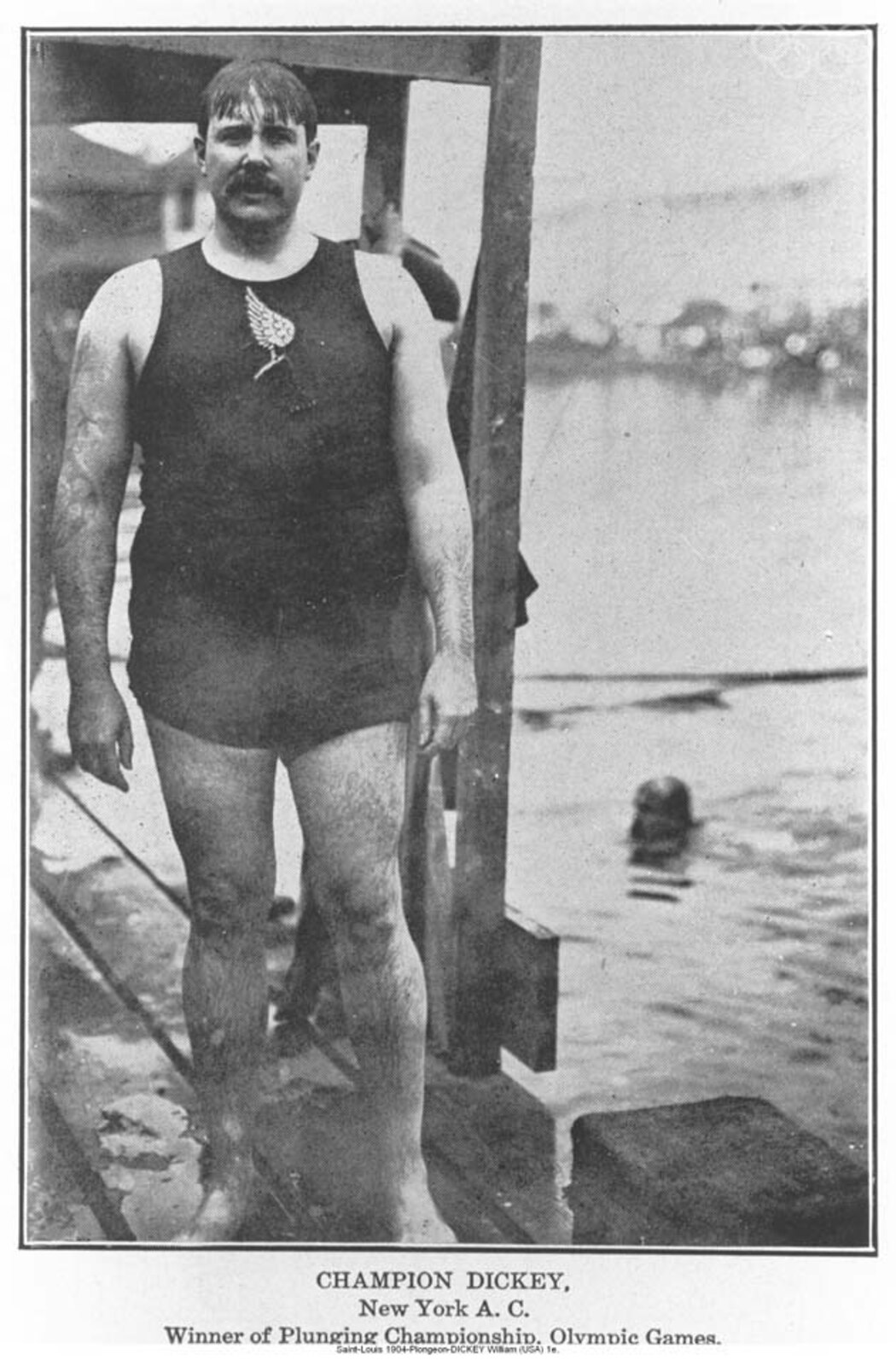
- William Dickey
- Venue: Forest Park
- Date: September 5, 1904
- Competitors: 5 from 1 nation

Medalists
1st place, gold medalist(s)		William Dickey	United States
2nd place, silver medalist(s)		Edgar Adams	United States
3rd place, bronze medalist(s)		Leo Goodwin	United States

Plunge for distance was an underwater diving event held as part of the diving at the 1904 Summer Olympics programme. The competition was held on Monday, September 5, 1904. It was the first time diving events were held at the Olympics. Five divers competed.

Plunge for distance was a diving long jump. Competitors dove into the pool from a standing position and their attained distance was measured after either 60 seconds passed or their head broke the surface, whichever came first. Plunge for distance did not appear in any subsequent Olympic Games.

== Results ==
Place	Diver	Nation	Width (m)
1st place, gold medalist(s)	William Paul Dickey	United States	19.05
2nd place, silver medalist(s)	Edgar Adams	United States	17.526
3rd place, bronze medalist(s)	Leo Budd Goodwin	United States	17.37
4	Newman Samuels	United States	16.764
5	Charles Pyrah	United States	13.97

== See also ==
- History of swimming
