= David Bratton =

American water polo player (1869–1904)

- Battan as an athlete in NYAC Jersey, with the winged foot

Personal information
- Full name: David Hey Bratton
- National team: United States
- Born: October 1869 New York, New York
- Died: December 3, 1904 (aged 35) Chicago, Illinois

Sport
- Sport: Swimming
- Strokes: Freestyle, water polo
- Club: New York Athletic Club (NYAC)
- Coach: Gus Sundstrom (NYAC)
Medal record
Men's water polo
Representing the United States
| Gold medal – first place | 1904 St. Louis | Team competition |

David Hey Bratton (October 1869 – December 3, 1904) was an American water polo player and competition swimmer who competed for the New York Athletic Club and represented the United States at the 1904 Summer Olympics in St. Louis, Missouri.

Bratton was born in New York City in October, 1869. He began competitive swimming with the Knickerbocker Athletic Club in New York, but the club later folded.

== 1904 St. Louis Olympic Gold ==
The 1904 Olympics in St. Louis were conducted as part of the Louisiana Purchase Exposition, a World's Fair. The swimming and water polo events were held in early September in the lake that hosted lifesaving exhibitions. The lake was a man-made open body of water and had no lanes or starting blocks for swimming competition. The aquatic area used was not constructed for competitive swimming, and the water was reportedly contaminated, which led to health risks for a few athletes, including Bratton and his teammate George Van Cleaf.

He was sponsored by the New York Athletic Club (NYAC) at the time of the 1904 Olympics and was a member of NYAC Olympic water polo team that won the 1904 Olympic gold medal in water polo team competition. The 1904 team, coached by Gus Sundstrom included Bratton, George Van Cleaf, Leo Goodwin, Louis Handley, David Hesser, Joe Ruddy, and James Steen. Bratton's New York Athletic Club team won handily, defeating the Missouri Athletic Club by a score of 5–0 in the semi-finals on September 5, 1904, and defeating the Chicago Athletic Association by a score of 6–0 in the final round on September 6. The 1904 Olympics were not a strongly international event as a total of only 62 of the 651 athletes who competed in the events resided outside North America.

Bratton was also a member of the NYAC team in the men's 4x50-yard freestyle relay which finished fourth in the Olympic final.

=== Early death ===
Three months following the 1904 Olympics, Bratton died on December 3, 1904 of typhoid fever and peritonitis at Chicago's Auditorium Hotel. In his honor, the New York Athletic Club postponed their planned swimming meet scheduled for the evening of December 10, 1904. He was cremated at Fresh Pond in Queens, New York on the afternoon of December 8 as managed by his Masonic Lodge. Bratton had been known as both a swimmer and cyclist, and excelled in roller skating.

=== See also ===
- Olympic and Paralympic deaths
