= Charlotte Boyle =

Charlotte Boyle may refer to:

- Charlotte Cavendish, Marchioness of Hartington (1731–1754), daughter of Richard Boyle, 3rd Earl of Burlington
- Charlotte Boyle (swimmer) (1899–1990), American swimmer
