= George Van Cleaf =

American swimmer

- A young Van Cleaf in his Club Jersey

Personal information
- Full name: George W. Van Cleaf
- National team: United States
- Born: October 8, 1879 Northfield, New York
- Died: January 6, 1905 (aged 25) Brooklyn, New York
- Height: 1.73 m (5 ft 8 in)
- Weight: 66 kg (146 lb)

Sport
- Sport: Swimming
- Strokes: Freestyle, water polo
- Club: Knickerbocker Club; New York Athletic Club (NYAC)
- Coach: Gus Sundstrom (NYAC)
Medal record
Men's water polo
Representing the United States
Olympic Games
Gold medal – first place	1904 St. Louis	Team competition

George W. Van Cleaf (October 8, 1879 – January 6, 1905) was an American water polo player and swimmer who represented the United States at the 1904 Summer Olympics in St. Louis, Missouri, winning a team gold medal in the water polo competition. An accomplished member of the New York Athletic Club, and national champion in the one-mile swim in 1900, Van Cleaf died of typhoid in January 1905 from swimming in the contaminated water in the man-made pool at the 1904 St. Louis Olympics.

== Early life ==
Van Cleaf was born October 8, 1979, to father Garrett W. Van Cleaf and mother Phebe M. Van Cleaf in Northfield, New York on Staten Island, though he spent much of his later life in greater Brooklyn. By the age of 15, he had become well-known in the local swimming community for winning and placing well in swimming competitions. In addition to later training in the pool at the New York Athletic Club, he trained by swimming in the ocean at Bath Beach, near his place of residence in Brooklyn. Not discouraged by the cold, he swam frequently in the early spring after ice had left the water's surface. Van Cleaf initially swam for New York's Knickerbocker Club, but after it relocated, he joined the accomplished New York Athletic Club, where he became well-known in the swimming community.

In his career as a nationally recognized water polo competitor, Van Cleaf was on a senior national championship water polo team in four instances. He competed in water polo and swimming from 1896 to 1905. Accomplished in long distance swimming, in 1900 he was an American Athletic Union national champion in the one-mile swim. In his career as a swimming and water polo competitor, he was reputed to have won as many as two hundred awards.

On February 27, 1904, Van Cleaf's New York Athletic Club water polo team defeated the team from Massachusetts' Brookline Swimming Club 7-1 at the Central Park South Clubhouse, though the results of the swimming contests were closer. Van Cleaf placed third in the 100-yard swim event behind Harry Le Moyne, whose time of 1:02.4 was one second off the American record owned by Le Moyne, and C.M. Daniels.

== 1904 St. Louis Olympic gold ==
The 1904 Olympics in St. Louis were conducted as part of the Louisiana Purchase Exposition, a World's Fair. The swimming and water polo events were held in early September in the lake that hosted lifesaving exhibitions. The lake was a man-made open body of water and had no lanes or starting blocks for swimming competition. The aquatic area used was not constructed for competitive swimming, and the water was reportedly contaminated, which led to health risks for a few athletes, including Van Cleaf and his teammate David Bratton.

The New York Athletic Club team at the 1904 St. Louis Olympics, coached by Gus Sundstrom included David Bratton, Van Cleaf, Leo Goodwin, Louis Handley, David Hesser, Joe Ruddy, and James Steen. Louis Handley served as Captain of the team. An exceptional program, between 1898-1911, the New York AC team won all but one of the AAU Water Polo titles for indoor and outdoor competition. A competent distance swimmer and a former one-mile champion, Van Cleaf was entered in the 1 mile freestyle event, as well as the 50, 100, 220, and 880 yard events, but did not participate.

Van Cleaf's team won the 1904 Olympic water polo competition handily, defeating the Missouri Athletic Club by a score of 5–0 in the semi-finals on September 5, 1904, and defeating the Chicago Athletic Association by a score of 6–0 in the final round on September 6. The 1904 Olympics were not a strongly international event as a total of only 62 of the 651 athletes who competed in the events resided outside North America. He won a gold medal as a member of the New York Athletic Club's Olympic water polo team, and was also a member of the NYAC's fourth-place team in the men's 4x50-yard freestyle relay. He and his water polo teammate, David Bratton, died of typhoid fever within four months after the competition.

=== Early death ===
Van Cleaf died at age 25 on January 6, 1905 at his home on 20th Avenue in Bath Beach, Brooklyn, of typhoid fever, and was buried in Green-wood Cemetery. His well-attended funeral service, conducted by the Reverend Alfred. H. Brush, was held in Brooklyn's Bath Beach at his residence on 20th Avenue in Brooklyn, New York. Swimmers and water polo players, and several fellow 1904 Olympic water polo medalists including Joe Ruddy, L. B. "Leo" Goodwin, Louis Handley, Fred Wenk, E. H. Adams and Otto Wahle, an Olympic swimming medalist and coach, served as pallbearers. In his honor, the New York Athletic Club water polo event scheduled for Saturday, January 19, 1905, was cancelled, though the swimming competitions were held.

=== Honors ===
In 1988, he was inducted into the USA Water Polo Hall of Fame.

=== See also ===
- Olympic and Paralympic deaths
