= Hayward Davenport =

English painter (1874–1959)

- Born: 1874
- Died: 1959 (aged 84–85)
- Occupation: pharmacist

Hayward Montague Davenport (1874–1959), usually referred to as Hayward M. Davenport, was an English maritime painter and pharmacist. His most notable work is a large watercolour entitled Oak and Steel, which was exhibited at the Royal Academy of Arts in 1894. Other works exhibited at the Royal Academy include A View of Hampton Court Palace. He painted extensively for commission before 1901, principally for the captains of the ships depicted. In 1901, on the death of his grandfather, John Thistlewood Davenport, Davenport gave up painting to assume his role as Chairman of J. T. Davenport & Sons, a London-based pharmaceuticals company which marketed Dr. J. Collis Browne's Chlorodyne. His large canvas entitled, H.M.S. "Ophir" leaving Portsmouth, March 15, 1901, with the Duke and Duchess of Cornwall and York on their historic 40,000 mile cruise of the Empire, sold at Sotheby's in May 2002.
