= David Hesser =

American swimmer (1884–1908)

Personal information
- Full name: David A. Hesser
- National team: United States
- Born: circa January 1884
- Died: February 13, 1908 (aged 24) New York
- Weight: 155 lb (70 kg)

Sport
- Sport: Swimming, Water Polo
- Position: Attacking Right Forward (WP); Modern Driver
- Strokes: Freestyle, water polo
- Club: New York Athletic Club (NYAC)
- Coach: Gus Sundstrom (NYAC)
Medal record
Men's water polo
Representing the United States
Olympic Games
Gold medal – first place	1904 St. Louis	Team competition

David A. Hesser (January 1884 – February 13, 1908) was an American water polo player and swimmer who represented the United States at the 1904 Summer Olympics in St. Louis, Missouri. Competing for the New York Athletic Club team at the 1904 Olympics, he won a team gold medal.

Hesser was born in January 1884 in New York to Alfred M. and Mary Hesser.

== Early swimming ==
In January, 1903, Hesser won the 50-yard novice competition held at the New York Athletic Club in a time of 32.6 seconds. On November 14, 1903, Hesser tied for first place in the 100-yard swimming event held at the New York Athletic Club with a time very close to 1:10. In water polo events for the New York Athletic Club, Hesser was a frequent scorer. Gus Sundstrom served as one of his Hesser's water polo coaches at the New York Athletic Club. At around 155 pounds in 1905, Hesser was not the most experienced player on the NYAC team, but was aggressive in his play, and able to score against taller and heavier opponents.

== 1904 St. Louis Olympics ==
At the 1904 Olympics, Hesser was sponsored by the New York Athletic Club (NYAC), and was a member of the NYAC Olympic water polo team that won the gold medal in the event. He was also a member of the NYAC Olympic relay team in the men's 4x50-yard freestyle relay which finished fourth in the event final. He was entered to compete in the 50 and 100-meter freestyle swimming events, but did not participate.

=== Water polo competition ===
The 1904 competition in water polo was part of the 1904 St. Louis World’s Fair, and was held at the Life Saving Exhibition Lake on September 5-6. Only American teams competed in the water polo tournament. In the final game for the gold medal, Hesser scored a goal in the 6-0 victory over the team from the Chicago Athletic Club. The 1904 U.S. Olympic water polo team that won the gold medal consisted of David Bratton, George Van Cleaf, Leo Goodwin, Louis Handley, Joe Ruddy, and James Steen. Louis Handley, later a coach for the New York Swimming Association, acted as the New York Athletic Club team Captain. NYAC team member Leo Goodwin scored the other five goals. The lake used for the life saving exhibition and water polo tournament was part of the agricultural exhibit, and some of the cattle from the agricultural exhibit walked into the lake. Although swimming and water polo were held in a different part of the lake, within a year of the competition, four of the water polo competitors were the fatal victims of typhus.

Hesser died in New York in 1908, at the age of 24. A private funeral was held at his parent's home at 521 West 159th Street in New York.
