= John Thistlewood Davenport =

1891 advertisement for J. Collis Browne's Chlorodyne

John Thistlewood Davenport (1817–1901) was an English pharmacist and businessman. He was the founder of J. T. Davenport & Sons, a pharmaceuticals company based in Great Russell Street, London which bought the patent for Dr. John Collis Browne's 'chlorodyne' and sold the famous drug for ailments including headache, stomachache, insomnia, and cholera. Davenport served as Vice-President of the Royal Pharmaceutical Society of Great Britain (formerly the Pharmaceutical Society of Great Britain) from 1853–55 and as its President, 1855-56. An obituary for him in the Society's Pharmaceutical Journal gave this credit to him: “the first official recognition of the Society in connection with the British Pharmacopoeia may be said to date from the time of Mr. Davenport’s presidency.”

== Personal life ==
Davenport was nephew of Arthur Thistlewood, the leader of the Cato Street conspiracy. He married Cecilia Hopgood, daughter of Thomas Burn Hopgood (1785–1860), the London silvermaker. His second wife was Eliza Clarendon Forbes, daughter of Captain John Forbes. Amongst his children were Horace Davenport the athlete and Cambridge University's one time representative in the 'mile dash' and Rev. John M. Davenport. Davenport's grandson was Hayward Davenport who later took over the business.
