= Edgar Adams =

American diver and swimmer

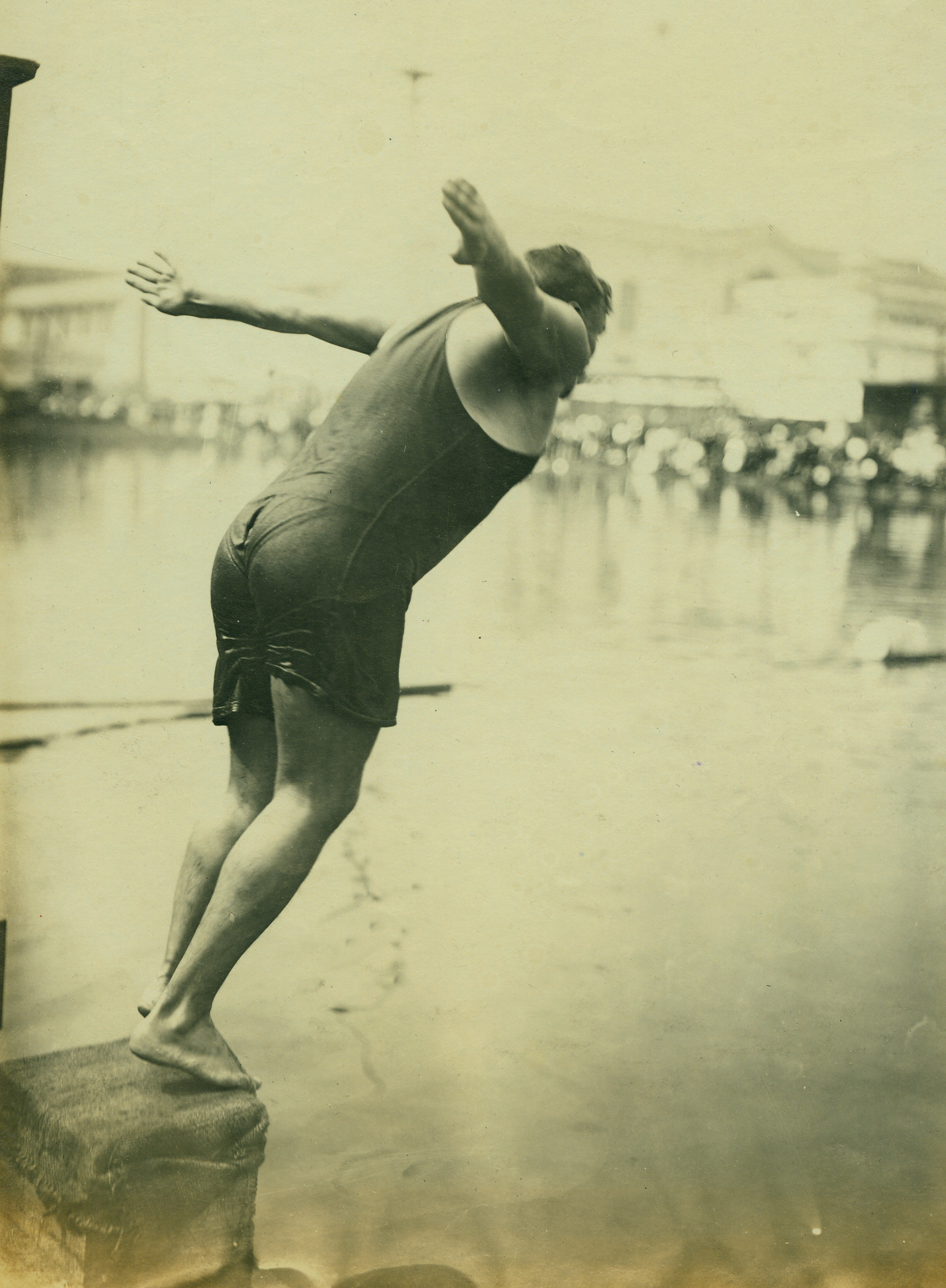
- Adams diving in the plunge for distance at the 1904 Olympics.

Personal information
- Full name: Edgar Holmes Adams
- National team: United States
- Born: April 7, 1868 Grafton, West Virginia
- Died: May 5, 1940 (aged 72) Bayville, New York

Sport
- Sport: Swimming
- Strokes: Freestyle, diving
- Club: New York Athletic Club
Medal record
Men's swimming
Representing the United States
Olympic Games
Silver medal – second place	1904 St. Louis	Plunge for distance

Edgar Holmes Adams (April 7, 1868 – May 5, 1940) was an American competition diver and swimmer, numismatic scholar, author, coin collector and dealer.

== Swimming ==
He represented the United States at the 1904 Summer Olympics in St. Louis, Missouri, where he won a silver medal in the men's plunge for distance event, finishing behind compatriot William Dickey. Competing in the swimming events at the 1904 Summer Olympics, he finished fourth in the 220-yard freestyle, 880-yard freestyle, and the 4×50-yard freestyle relay. He also competed in the one-mile freestyle but did not finish the race.

== Numismatics ==
Adams was a prolific numismatic author who coauthored, with William H. Woodin, United States Pattern, Trial, and Experimental Pieces, but is probably best known for the reference volume Private Gold Coinages of California, 1849-1855: Its History and Its Issues, originally published serially (1911-1912) in the American Journal of Numismatics.

He wrote a numismatics column for The Sun. Farran Zerbe brought him onto the staff of the American Numismatic Association journal The Numismatist in 1909, and the from 1912 to 1915 Adams served as editor of The Numismatist.

He was inducted into the Numismatic Hall of Fame in 1969.

== Publications by Adams ==
- Adams' Official Premium List of United States Private and Territorial Gold Coins. New York: Willett Press, 1909.
- Private Gold Coinage of California, 1849-55, Its History and Its Issues. New York, Edgar H. Adams, 1913.
- United States Pattern, Trial and Experimental Pieces. New York, American Numismatic Society, 1913.
- United States Store Cards. New York: E.H. Adams and W. Raymond, 1920.
