= Horace Davenport (cricketer) =

English cricketer

Personal information
- Full name: Horace John Davenport
- Born: 11 January 1875; Camberwell, Surrey, England
- Died: 20 August 1946 (aged 71); England
- Batting: Right-handed

Domestic team information
- Years: Team
- 1898: Marylebone Cricket Club

Career statistics
Competition	First-class
Matches	1
Runs scored	2
Batting average	1.00
100s/50s	–/–
Top score	2
Catches/stumpings	–/–
- Source: Cricinfo, 12 September 2021

Horace John Davenport (11 January 1875 — 20 August 1946) was an English first-class cricketer.

The son of the swimmer Horace Davenport, he was born at Camberwell in January 1875. He was educated at Repton School, where he played for the school cricket team. From Repton he went up to Trinity College, Cambridge. He was a talented athlete while at Cambridge, gaining a blue in both athletics and field hockey. He was of the Cambridge detachment who reinforced the London Athletic Club during their tour of the United States in 1895, with Davenport competing in the 880-yard run, mile run and the 3-mile run at Yale University. Davenport was president of the Cambridge University Athletics Club in 1897. He later played first-class cricket for the Marylebone Cricket Club (MCC) against Cambridge University at Fenner's in 1898. Opening the batting twice in the match, he was dismissed for 2 runs in the MCC first innings by Clem Wilson, while in their second innings he was dismissed without scoring by Herman de Zoete. He was declared bankrupt in 1921. Davenport died in August 1946.
