= Charlotte Boyle (swimmer) =

American swimmer (1899–1990)

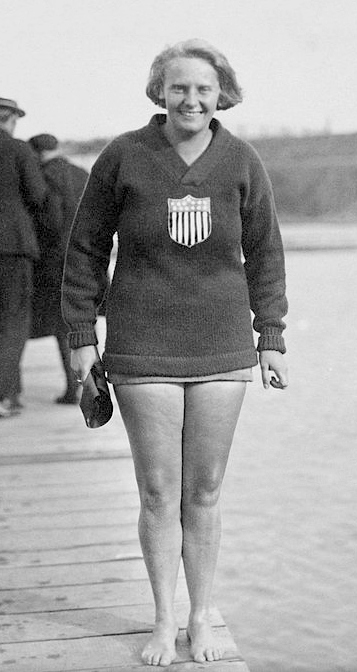
- Boyle at 1920 Olympics

Personal information
- Full name: Charlotte Duggan Boyle
- National team: United States
- Born: August 20, 1899 Honolulu, Hawaii
- Died: October 3, 1990 (aged 91) Scottsville, New York, U.S.
- Height: 5 ft 6 in (1.68 m)

Sport
- Sport: Swimming
- Strokes: freestyle
- Club: Women's Swimming Association; New York
- Coach: Louis Handley

Charlotte Duggan Boyle (August 20, 1899 – October 3, 1990), also known by her married name Charlotte Clune, was an American competition swimmer who competed at the 1920 Antwerp Olympics in the 100 meter freestyle, as part of the first Olympics in which women were allowed to compete in swimming events. She held a world record in the 200-meter freestyle in 1921.

== Women's Swimming Association ==
Boyle swam for the Women's Swimming Association of New York, managed and founded by Charlotte Epstein in 1917, and was coached by Hall of Fame Coach Louis Handley. Epstein was instrumental in helping women swimmers compete in the Olympic games for the first time in Antwerp in 1920 and enroll as members of the American Athletic Union for the first time in 1914. Epstein also pushed for women to be allowed to compete at longer distances, and Boyle would later win a title in national competition in the 5-mile swim. Boyle was considered one of the first great freestyle swimmers to emerge from the WSA swimming program, which would eventually dominate many women's swimming events. Several of her 1920 Olympic teammates swam and trained with her at the WSA, including diving gold medalist Aileen Riggin and diving silver medalist Helen Wainwright.

== 1920 Olympics ==
Boyle represented the United States at the 1920 Summer Olympics in Antwerp, Belgium, where she competed in the women's 100-meter freestyle, swimming a 1:20.4 in the semi-finals, which did not advance her to the final meet. Her fellow swimmer at the Women's Swimming Association, Ethelda Bleibtrey, won the 100 freestyle event that year in 1:13.6, a world record at the time. She was a former world record-holder in the 200-meter freestyle and the old 220-yard freestyle events. She also set U.S. records in the now-forgotten plunge for distance event.

She won national titles in distances from 50 yards to the five mile long distance event. Boyle captured American Athletic Union titles in the 100-yard freestyle in 1918, and the 50 yard freestyle, and took titles in the 100-yard free in 1919 and 1921.

After her swimming career, Boyle had a long marriage with Henry Clune, a highly recognized columnist with the Rochester Democrat and Chronicle. She later had a successful career as a coach, teaching thousands to swim. She died on October 3, 1990, in Scottsville, New York, where she had been a resident for many years. She and Clune had four sons.

== Honors ==
Boyle was inducted into the International Swimming Hall of Fame as an "Honor Pioneer Swimmer" in 1988.

== See also ==
- List of members of the International Swimming Hall of Fame
- World record progression 200 metres freestyle

Records
Preceded by Fanny Durack	Women's 200-meter freestyle world record-holder (long course); August 25, 1921 – April 4, 1923	Succeeded by Gertrude Ederle
