= List of multi-sport champions =

Multi-sport champions

A multi-sport athlete is an athlete who competes or trains at two or more different sports. A notable two-sport athlete, Deion Sanders achieved the rare feat of playing in both a Super Bowl and a World Series. While he won two Super Bowl titles, a World Series championship eluded him.

The following is a list of professional athletes who have earned recognition as Olympic champions or world champions in other major competitions in at least two distinct sports.

== List of athletes ==
The following is arranged by the earliest to accomplish the feat.

#	Year Achieved	Athlete	Sports	Notes
1	1896	Carl Schuhmann	Artistic gymnastics Greco-Roman wrestling	At the inaugural modern Olympic Games in 1896, Schuhmann won gold medals in artistic gymnastics in the team parallel bars, team horizontal bar, and vault. He also captured gold in the Games' sole wrestling event, becoming the first athlete to win four gold medals at a single Olympics.
2	1916	Jim Thorpe	Track and field American football	Thorpe won gold medals in the pentathlon and decathlon at the 1912 Summer Olympics. In football, he was a three-time champion of the Ohio League, the predecessor to the NFL. He also played professional baseball and basketball.
3	1920 (Note: Kirksey won gold in a second sport on September 5, 1920, while Norling won gold in a second sport on September 12, 1920.)	Morris Kirksey	Track and field Rugby union	At the 1920 Summer Olympics, Kirksey won gold in the 4 × 100 metres relay, silver in the 100 metres, and also helped the American team capture gold in rugby.
4	1920	Daniel Norling	Artistic gymnastics Equestrian vaulting	At the 1908 Summer Olympics, Norling represented Sweden, winning gold in the gymnastics team event. He repeated the feat at the 1912 Games in the team Swedish system event, and later added another gold medal in team equestrian jumping at the 1920 Games.
5	1932	Eddie Eagan	Boxing; Bobsleigh	Eagan competed in boxing during his first two Olympic appearances, capturing gold in the light heavyweight division at the 1920 Summer Olympics. He later switched to bobsleigh at the 1932 Winter Olympics, where he helped the four-man team secure another gold medal. He is the only athlete to win a gold medal in both the Winter and Summer Olympics.
6	1940	Babe Didrikson Zaharias	Track and field Golf	Excelling at sports including basketball and baseball, Zaharias won gold medals in the 80m hurdles and javelin throw, and a silver medal in the high jump at the 1932 Summer Olympics. In golf, she won 10 LPGA major championships.
7	1946	Otto Graham	American football Basketball	Months before beginning his rookie season with the Cleveland Browns in 1946, Graham joined the Rochester Royals of the National Basketball League (a precursor to the NBA), helping them sweep the Sheboygan Red Skins for the NBL title. That same year, he also won his first professional football championship, making him a two-sport champion in 1946. He went on to win four AAFC championships and three NFL championships, all with the Browns.
8	1948	Jaroslav Drobný	Tennis; Ice hockey	Drobný won one Wimbledon and two French Open titles in singles, and one French Open title apiece in doubles and mixed doubles. In ice hockey, he won a gold medal at the 1947 World Championships and a silver medal at the 1948 Winter Olympics representing Czechoslovakia.
9	1959	Gene Conley	Baseball; Basketball	The only athlete to win a World Series and NBA Championship, Conley was a four-time All-Star pitcher and won the 1957 World Series with the Milwaukee Braves. He also spent six seasons in the NBA, winning three straight championships with the Boston Celtics before finishing his basketball career in the Eastern Professional Basketball League.
10	1972	Bob Hayes	Track and field American football	The only athlete in history to win an Olympic gold medal and a Super Bowl, Hayes won the men's 100 metres and 4 × 100 metres relay at the 1964 Summer Olympics. On January 16, 1972, he won Super Bowl VI as a member of the Dallas Cowboys.
11	1986	Christa Luding-Rothenburger	Speed skating Track cycling	Luding-Rothenburger captured gold in the 500 metres speed skating at the 1984 Winter Olympics, adding a silver in 1988 and a bronze in 1992, and also claimed gold in the 1000 metres at the 1984 Games. In track cycling, she won the World Championships in 1986 and earned a silver medal at the 1988 Olympics.
12	1994 (Note: After winning the PBA Players Championship.)	Walter Ray Williams Jr.	Bowling; Horseshoes	Williams has won a record 47 standard PBA Tour career titles, including the 2001–02, 2002–03, and 2005–06 PBA World Championship. In horseshoes, Williams is a six-time world champion and three-time junior world champion.
13	2008	Rebecca Romero	Rowing; Track cycling	Romero earned a silver medal at the 2004 Summer Olympics and captured gold the following year at the 2005 World Rowing Championships. In track cycling, she won gold at the 2008 Summer Olympics and is a two-time UCI Track Cycling World Champion.
14	2018	Ester Ledecká	Snowboarding; Alpine skiing	At the 2018 Winter Olympics, Ledecká competed in both snowboarding and alpine skiing, claiming gold in the parallel giant slalom and the Super-G. She won gold again in the parallel giant slalom at the 2022 Winter Olympics.
15	2018	Tove Alexandersson	Orienteering; Ski orienteering Ski mountaineering Skyrunning; Trail running SkySnow (Note: Ski orienteering is a discipline of orienteering. Similarly, SkySnow is a discipline of Skyrunning.)	Alexandersson has won dozens of gold medals at world championships across several different sports, including the World Orienteering Championships, World Ski Orienteering Championships, Skyrunning World Championships, World Championships of Ski Mountaineering, IAU Trail World Championships, and SkySnow World Championships.

=== Notable exceptions ===
The IOC classifies cross-country skiing, Nordic combined, and biathlon as related sports since cross-country skiing is a core element in each, rather than treating them as distinctly different sports (DDS). Likewise, swimming and water polo are both part of aquatics and thus considered related rather than distinct.

Year Achieved	Athlete	Sports	Notes
1900	John Arthur Jarvis	Swimming; Water polo	At the 1900 Summer Olympics, Jarvis represented Great Britain, winning gold medals in the 1000 metres freestyle and the 4000 metres freestyle, as well as in water polo.
1904	Leo Goodwin	Swimming; Water polo	At the 1904 Summer Olympics, Goodwin represented the United States, winning gold in water polo and in the 4 x 50 yards freestyle relay.
1904	Louis Handley	Swimming; Water polo	At the 1904 Summer Olympics, Handley represented the United States, winning gold in water polo and in the 4 × 50 yards freestyle relay.
1904	Joe Ruddy	Swimming; Water polo	At the 1904 Summer Olympics, Ruddy represented the United States, winning gold in water polo and in the 4 × 50 yards freestyle relay.
1912	Paul Radmilovic	Swimming; Water polo	Representing Great Britain at the 1908 Summer Olympics, Radmilovic won gold in water polo and in swimming's 4 × 200 metres freestyle relay. He later added two more water polo gold medals at the 1912 and 1920 Games.
1924	Thorleif Haug	Cross-country skiing Nordic combined	At the 1924 Winter Olympics, Haug won gold in the 18 kilometre and 50 kilometre cross-country skiing events. She also won a gold medal at the Nordic combined.
1928	Johan Grøttumsbråten	Cross-country skiing Nordic combined	At the 1928 Winter Olympics, Grøttumsbråten won a gold medal in the 18 kilometre cross-country skiing event and Nordic combined. He repeated at the Nordic combined in the 1932 Winter Olympics.
1952	Heikki Hasu	Cross-country skiing Nordic combined	Hasu won gold in Nordic combined at the 1948 Winter Olympics and added a silver in the event at the 1952 Games, where he also captured gold in the cross-country relay. At the 1950 World Championships, he won gold in Nordic combined and silver in the cross-country relay.
1992	Anfisa Reztsova	Biathlon; Cross-country skiing	Reztsova won gold in the biathlon at the 1992 and 1994 Olympic Games. She also won a gold medal in cross-country skiing at the 1988 Winter Olympics and three gold medals at the World Championships.

== Combat sports ==
ADCC and IBJJF world champions are grouped as BJJ/Submission grappling—distinct in style, but part of the same grappling discipline.

#	Year Achieved	Athlete	Sports	Notes
1	2002 (Note: After winning the UFC Middleweight Championship on January 11, 2002.)	Murilo Bustamante	BJJ; MMA	Bustamante captured gold at the 1999 World IBJJF Jiu-Jitsu Championships, adding to his two bronze medals in 1998 and a silver in 2000. In MMA, he is a former UFC Middleweight Champion.
2	2002 (Note: After winning the UFC Heavyweight Championship on September 27, 2002.)	Ricco Rodriguez	Submission grappling MMA	Rodriguez captured gold at the 1998 ADCC World Championships, adding a bronze in 1999 and a silver in 2000, before going on to claim the UFC Heavyweight Championship in MMA.
3	2003 (Note: After winning the Pride Heavyweight Championship on March 16, 2003.)	Fedor Emelianenko	Sambo; MMA	Emelianenko is a four-time Combat Sambo World Champion. In MMA, he held several heavyweight titles, including the Pride Heavyweight Championship.
4	2004 (Note: After winning the UFC Welterweight Championship on January 31, 2004.)	B.J. Penn	BJJ; MMA	Penn won a gold medal at the World IBJJF Jiu-Jitsu Championship in 2000. In MMA, he was a two-division UFC champion, at lightweight and welterweight.
5	2009 (Note: After winning the World IBJJF Jiu-Jitsu No-Gi Championship on November 8, 2009.)	Josh Barnett	BJJ/Submission wrestling MMA	Barnett is a former UFC Heavyweight Champion. He also won gold medals at the 2009 World IBJJF Jiu-Jitsu No-Gi Championships and 2018 Snake Pit World Championships.
6	2010 (Note: After winning the Strikeforce Middleweight Championship on August 21, 2010.)	Ronaldo Souza	BJJ/Submission grappling MMA	Souza is a three-time World IBJJF Jiu-Jitsu Champion, two-time ADCC World Champion, and two-time CBJJO World Cup Champion. In MMA, he is the former Strikeforce Middleweight Champion.
7	2010 (Note: After winning the Bellator Featherweight World Championship on September 2, 2010.)	Joe Warren	Greco-Roman wrestling MMA	Warren captured a gold medal in the 60 kg weight class at the 2006 World Wrestling Championships. In MMA, he is a former Bellator Bantamweight and Featherweight World Champion.
8	2010 (Note: After winning the Bellator Bantamweight World Championship on October 14, 2010.)	Zach Makovsky	Grappling; MMA	Makovsky is a two-time FILA World Grappling Champion. In MMA, he is a former Bellator Bantamweight World Champion.
9	2010 (Note: After winning the Bellator Welterweight Championship on October 21, 2010.)	Ben Askren	Grappling; MMA	In 2009, Askren won the FILA World Grappling Championship. In MMA, he is the former Bellator and ONE Welterweight World Championship.
10	2013 (Note: After winning the ONE Bantamweight MMA World Championship on October 15, 2021.)	Bibiano Fernandes	BJJ; MMA	Fernandes is a three-time World IBJJF Jiu-Jitsu Champion as a black belt. In MMA, he is a two-time undisputed ONE Bantamweight MMA World Champion.
11	2013 (Note: After winning the Bellator Heavyweight World Championship on November 15, 2013.)	Vitaly Minakov	Sambo; MMA	Minakov is a four-time FIAS World Sambo Champion. In MMA, he is a former Bellator Heavyweight World Champion.
12	2014 (Note: After winning the World Sambo Championship on November 21, 2014.)	Vadim Nemkov	Sambo; MMA	Nemkov is a four-time FIAS Combat Sambo World Champion. In MMA, he is a former Bellator Light Heavyweight World Champion.
13	2015 (Note: After winning the UFC Strawweight Championship on March 14, 2015.)	Joanna Jędrzejczyk	Muay Thai; MMA	Jędrzejczyk is a four-time senior IFMA World Muay Thai Champion. She is also the former UFC Strawweight Champion.
14	2015 (Note: After unifying the UFC Heavyweight Championship on June 13, 2015.)	Fabrício Werdum	BJJ/Submission grappling MMA	Werdum is a four-time World IBJJF Jiu-Jitsu Champion and two-time ADCC World Champion. In MMA, he is a former UFC Heavyweight Champion.
15	2015 (Note: After winning the UFC Bantamweight Championship on November 15, 2015.)	Holly Holm	Boxing; MMA	Holm held several world titles in boxing, including the WBA and WBC Welterweight Championship. In MMA, she is a former LFA and UFC Bantamweight Champion.
16	2016 (Note: After winning the ONE Light Heavyweight Championship on May 6, 2016.)	Roger Gracie	BJJ/Submission grappling MMA	Gracie is a 10-time World IBJJF Jiu-Jitsu Champion and two-time ADCC World Champion. In MMA, he is the former ONE Light Heavyweight World Champion.
17	2018 (Note: After winning the UFC Lightweight Championship on April 7, 2018.)	Khabib Nurmagomedov	Sambo; MMA	Nurmagomedov is a two-time WCSF Combat Sambo World Champion, winning consecutive gold medals in 2009 and 2010. In MMA, he is a former UFC Lightweight Champion.
18	2018 (Note: After winning the UFC Flyweight Championship on August 4, 2018.)	Henry Cejudo	Freestyle wrestling MMA	Cejudo, a decorated freestyle wrestler, won gold at the 2008 Beijing Olympics before transitioning to MMA, where he became a two-division UFC champion at flyweight and bantamweight.
19	2019 (Note: After winning the ONE Flyweight Kickboxing World Championship on May 10, 2019.)	Petchdam Petchyindee Academy	Muay Thai; Kickboxing	Petchdam is a former WBC Muay Thai Featherweight World Champion. In kickboxing, he is a former ONE Flyweight Kickboxing World Champion.
20	2019 (Note: After winning the Bellator Middleweight World Championship on June 22, 2019.)	Rafael Lovato Jr.	BJJ; MMA	Lovato Jr. won gold at the 2007 World IBJJF Jiu-Jitsu Championship. In MMA, he is a former Bellator Middleweight World Champion.
21	2019 (Note: After winning the PFL Lightweight Championship on December 31, 2019.)	Kayla Harrison	Judo; MMA	Harrison won back to back gold medals in judo at the 2012 and 2016 Summer Olympics. In MMA, she is a two-time PFL Lightweight Champion and UFC Bantamweight Champion.
22	2020 (Note: After winning the ONE Strawweight Kickboxing World Championship on February 28, 2020.)	Sam-A Gaiyanghadao	Muay Thai; Kickboxing	Sam-A is a former ONE Strawweight and Flyweight Muay Thai World Champion. In kickboxing, he held the ONE Strawweight Kickboxing World Champion.
23	2021 (Note: After winning the Bellator Welterweight World Championship on June 11, 2021.)	Yaroslav Amosov	Sambo; MMA	Amosov is a four-time WCSF Combat Sambo World Champion. In MMA, he is a former Bellator Welterweight World Champion.
24	2021 (Note: After winning the ONE Featherweight Kickboxing World Championship on October 15, 2021.)	Superbon Singha Mawynn	Muay Thai; Kickboxing	Superbon won three straight senior IFMA World Muaythai Championships from 2015 to 2017. In kickboxing, he is a two-time undisputed ONE Featherweight Kickboxing World Champion.
25	2021 (Note: After winning the IFMA World Muaythai Championships on December 11, 2021.)	Capitan Petchyindee Academy	Muay Thai; Kickboxing	Capitan is a two-time senior IFMA World Muay Thai Champion. In kickboxing, he is a former ONE Bantamweight Kickboxing World Champion.
26	2021 (Note: After winning the BKFC Cruiserweight Championship on June 26, 2021.)	Héctor Lombard	Bare-knuckle boxing MMA	Lombard was Bellator's inaugural Middleweight Champion in 2009, and in 2021, he was the BKFC Cruiserweight Champion.
27	2022 (Note: After winning the ONE Lightweight Muay Thai World Championship October 21, 2022.)	Regian Eersel	Muay Thai; Kickboxing	Eersel is the current ONE Lightweight Muay Thai World Champion. In Kickboxing, he is a former ONE Lightweight World Champion.
28	2022 (Note: After winning the vacant UFC Lightweight Championship on October 22, 2022.)	Islam Makhachev	Sambo; MMA	Makhachev won gold in the 74 kg weight class at the 2016 FIAS World Sambo Championships. In MMA, he is a former UFC Lightweight Champion.
29	2022 (Note: After winning the UFC Middleweight Championship on November 12, 2022.)	Alex Pereira	Kickboxing; MMA	Pereira is a former two-division Glory Kickboxing champion and a two-division UFC champion, having held titles at middleweight and light heavyweight in both organizations.
30	2022 (Note: After winning the ONE Bantamweight Kickboxing World Championship on November 19, 2022.)	Petchtanong Petchfergus	Muay Thai; Kickboxing	Petchtanong is a two-time WMC and IPCC Muay Thai World Champion, and has also captured the WLF World Cup at 67 kg. In kickboxing, he has held the ONE Bantamweight Kickboxing World Championship.
31	2023 (Note: After winning the ONE Flyweight Kickboxing World Championship on January 14, 2023.)	Superlek Kiatmuu9	Muay Thai; Kickboxing	Superlek is a former WBC Muay Thai Super Featherweight World Champion and ONE Bantamweight Muay Thai World Champion. In kickboxing, he has held the ONE Flyweight Kickboxing World Championship.
32	2023 (Note: After winning the ONE Bantamweight Kickboxing World Championship on November 4, 2023.)	Jonathan Haggerty	Muay Thai; Kickboxing	Haggerty is a former ONE Flyweight and Bantamweight Muay Thai World Champion. He also won the ONE Bantamweight Kickboxing World Championship.
33	2024 (Note: After winning the ONE Strawweight Kickboxing World Championship on June 28, 2024.)	Prajanchai P.K.Saenchaimuaythaigym	Muay Thai; Kickboxing	Prajanchai is a former ONE Strawweight Muay Thai World Champion. He has also won the ONE Strawweight Kickboxing World Championship.
34	2024 (Note: After winning the PFL Heavyweight Championship on November 29, 2024.)	Denis Goltsov	Sambo; MMA	Goltsov won back-to-back FIAS World Sambo Championships in 2016 and 2017 and later captured the PFL Heavyweight title in MMA.
35	2026 (Note: After winning the BKFC World Heavyweight Championship on February 7, 2026.)	Andrei Arlovski	Bare-knuckle boxing MMA	Arlovski was UFC's Heavyweight Champion in 2005 and BKFC Champion in 2026.
36	2026 (Note: After winning the WIBA World Super Welterweight World Championship on March 28, 2026.)	Cris Cyborg	MMA; Boxing	Cyborg is a five-time Featherweight Champion across multiple organizations, and in 2026 won the WIBA Light middleweight Championship.

=== Three-sport champions ===
#	Year Achieved	Athlete	Sports	Notes
1	2018 (Note: After winning the UFC Flyweight Championship on December 8, 2018.)	Valentina Shevchenko	Muay Thai; Kickboxing; MMA	Shevchenko is an eight-time IFMA World Muay Thai Champion and WMC super lightweight champion. In kickboxing, she is the former Kunlun Fight Lightweight Champion, WKC K-1 Lightweight World Champion, and 2004 WAKO World Kickboxing Champion. In MMA, Shevchenko is a two-time UFC Flyweight Champion.
2	2023 (Note: After winning the ONE Atomweight MMA Championship on September 30, 2023.)	Stamp Fairtex	Muay Thai; Kickboxing; MMA	Fairtex is a former ONE Atomweight Muay Thai, Kickboxing and MMA World Champion.

=== Honorable mentions ===
Although Ogawa, Lesnar, and Rousey won championships in professional wrestling, the sport is presented as scripted entertainment rather than genuine competition. Their inclusion is therefore noted as an honorable mention.

Year Achieved	Athlete	Sports	Notes
1999 (Note: After winning the NWA Heavyweight Championship on March 14, 1999.)	Naoya Ogawa	Judo; Professional wrestling	Ogawa was a four-time judo world champion and a silver medalist at the 1992 Summer Olympics. In professional wrestling, he is the former NWA World Heavyweight Champion.
2008 (Note: After winning the UFC Heavyweight Championship on November 15, 2008.)	Brock Lesnar	Professional wrestling (WWE); MMA	Lesnar has captured multiple WWE titles, including the Undisputed WWE Championship and the WWE Universal Championship. In MMA, he is the former UFC Heavyweight Champion. Lesnar also briefly pursued a career in football, signing with the Minnesota Vikings in 2004 before being released shortly afterward.
2018 (Note: After winning the WWE Women's Championship on August 19, 2018.)	Ronda Rousey	Professional wrestling (WWE); MMA	Rousey was the UFC's inaugural Women's Bantamweight Champion in 2012. In WWE, she won the Raw Women's Championship in 2018 and later won the SmackDown Women's Championship in 2022.

== See also ==
- List of multi-sport athletes
- List of athletes with Olympic medals in different sports
- List of world cups
- List of world sports championships
- Lists of Olympic medalists
- Lists of Paralympic medalists
