= Horace Davenport =

English swimmer

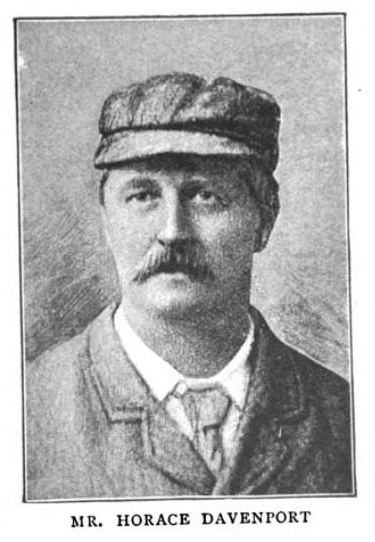

Personal information
- Full name: Horace Davenport
- Nationality: British
- Born: 29 April 1850
- Died: 23 January 1925 (aged 74) London, England
- Height: 5 ft 10.5 in (179 cm)
- Weight: 158 (1878)

Sport
- Sport: Swimming

Horace Davenport (29 April 1850 – 23 January 1925) was an English swimmer, known for endurance swims. In 1881, he also swam the Niagara River below Niagara Falls.

Davenport was born in London in 1850 to Cecilia and John Thistlewood Davenport. He swam at University College School, and also competed in rowing after leaving school. In 1874 he won the mile Amateur Championship swim, and successfully defended his title through 1879. His 1877 mile time of 29 minutes 25 seconds stood as a record for a number of years. He also won the amateur long distance championship (a five to six mile race) in 1877, 1878, 1879.

In 1884 he swam a round trip from Southsea to Ryde in 5 hours and 25 minutes. He also served multiple times as captain of the Ilex swimming club. He became president of the Swimming Association of Great Britain (now the Amateur Swimming Association) in 1880, serving through 1883, and 1890 through 1894.

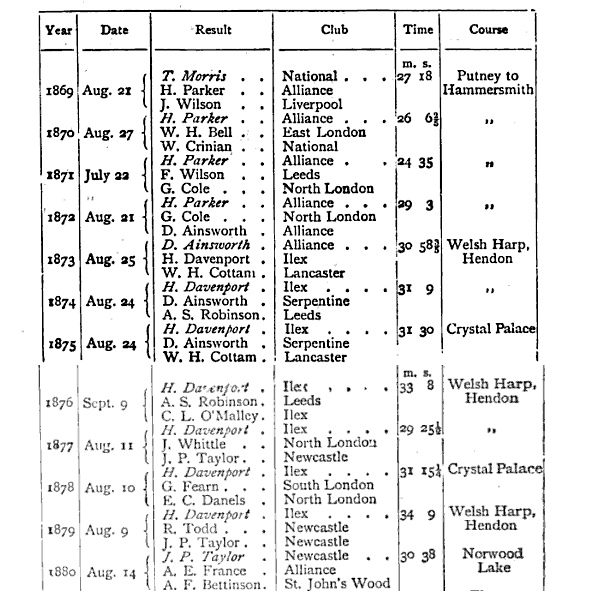
Winners of the amateur One Mile Championship Swim of England from 1869 through 1880. Davenport won six consecutive races from 1874 through 1879.

He also competed in the plunge for distance and won competitions in that event in the 1870s and 1880s, including the 1884, 1885, and 1886 English Plunging Championships, and was also known for plunging feet first.

Davenport was known for using a single-overarm stroke well-suited for long distance swims, as well as the side-stroke.

As of 2013, three trophies offered by the A.S.A. remain in the name of Davenport, including for the 400 metre men's freestyle, 1,500 metre men's freestyle, and 100 metre girl's breaststroke.

== Personal ==
Davenport married Kathleen Henrietta Florence Pirie (1855-1935) in 1873, and they had five daughters and two sons, including Horace, who was a first-class cricketer.
