= Joe Ruddy =

American swimmer

- Ruddy wearing the winged foot emblem on his NYAC suit

Personal information
- Full name: Joseph Aloysius Ruddy Sr.
- National team: United States
- Born: September 28, 1878 New York, New York, U.S.
- Died: November 11, 1962 (aged 84) Far Rockaway, New York, U.S.
- Spouse: Mary
- Children: 5

Sport
- Sport: Swimming
- Strokes: Freestyle, water polo
- Club: New York Athletic Club
- Coach: Gus Sundstrom (NYAC)
Medal record
Representing the United States
Men's swimming
| Gold medal – first place | 1904 St. Louis | 4x50 yd freestyle |
Men's water polo
| Gold medal – first place | 1904 St. Louis | Team competition |

Joseph Aloysius Ruddy Sr. (September 28, 1878 – November 11, 1962) was an American competition swimmer, water polo player and Coach who competed for the New York Athletic Club and represented the United States at the 1904 Summer Olympics in St. Louis, Missouri. He spent the 1930's coaching swimming at the New York Athletic Club.

Ruddy was born on September 28, 1878, in New York City to Thomas and Catherine Ruddy. He competed in American Athletic Union Tournaments in handicap races including distances of 300 and 880 yards while representing the De la Salle Athletic Club in the late 1880s. While representing the Knickerbocker Athletic Club at the Knickerbocker Athletic Club Fall Carnival in Bayonne, New Jersey in early September 1900, he won the 75-yard handicap race by five seconds with a time of 1:21.8.

== 1904 Olympic gold medals ==
=== 4x50 Freesyle relay gold ===
Ruddy won a gold medal as a member of the winning U.S. team in the 1904 St. Louis men's 4x50-yard freestyle relay composed of members of the New York Athletic Club coached by NYAC Head Coach Gus Sundstrom. The American team members included Ruddy as lead off swimmer, followed by Budd Goodwin, Louis Handley, and Charlie Daniels, a particularly accomplished American swimmer. The New York Athletic Club team swam a combined time of 2:04.6. The team from America's Chicago Athletic Club took second for the silver, and the team from the Missouri Athletic Club took third for the bronze.

=== Water Polo gold ===
Ruddy won a second gold medal as a member of the first-place U.S. water polo team that represented the New York Athletic Club, where he was coached by Gus Sundstrom. The 1904 Olympic gold medal New York Athletic Club team consisted of David Bratton, George Van Cleaf, Leo Goodwin, Louis Handley, David Hesser, Ruddy, and James Steen. Ruddy's New York Athletic Club team won handily, defeating the Missouri Athletic Club by a score of 5–0 in the semi-finals on September 5, 1904, and defeating the Chicago Athletic Association by a score of 6–0 in the final round on September 6. The 1904 Olympics were not a strongly international event as a total of only 62 of the 651 athletes who competed in the events resided outside North America.

Ruddy placed third in the 100-yard handicap event at the 1904 Olympics, though it was not a medal event, and both other entries were members of the American team.

=== 1907 NYAC WP team ===
New York Athletic Club Water Polo Team, 1907

In the photo at left Ruddy is shown seated at the far left with the New York Athletic Club water polo team in July, 1907. The team competed in the 1907 AAU swimming championship at Jamestown at the Grand Basin at the Smith Harbor and Discovery Landing. Coach Gus Sundstrom is standing in the center of the top row. L.B. Handley helped Captain the team in 1907, and later coached the New York Swimming Association. A complete list of the 1907 team standing at the photo at left from left to right include C.D. Trubenbach, L. B. Goodwin, Coach Gus Sundstrom, J. B. Naething, and E.E. Wenk Jr., and seated; from left to right, Ruddy, Ogden M. Reed, Captain Louis De Breda Handley, and James Steen. J.A. Ruddy was part of the gold medal team that competed with Goodwin in the 4x100 yard freestyle relay in 1904. An exceptional program, between 1898-1911, the New York AC water polo team won all but one of the AAU Water Polo titles for indoor and outdoor competition.

Ruddy continued to represent the New York Athletic Club, while winning both the harlequin and obstacle races at the Annual Water Sports Meet of the Jamaica Bay Yacht Club in early September, 1911.

== Water Polo coach, civil service ==
Ruddy continued to compete in Water Polo matches into his 50's. He later participated as an Olympic referee for the Water Polo competition at the 1928 Olympics.

During his life, he held national championships in swimming, handball, and water polo. Most significantly in his career, he coached both swimming and Water Polo teams for the New York Athletic Club roughly from 1930 to 1954, though he likely started earlier. His water polo teams were undefeated from 1930 to 1939 both in indoor and outdoor U.S. National Championships. Two of his sons, Donald and Joseph Jr. swam with the team during their undefeated seasons in the 1930s. The "soft" water polo ball, which could more easily be held with one hand, was not abandoned in the game until around 1945. The softball game was abandoned partly because it was believed the U. S. should concentrate on the "hard" ball game as it was being played more consistently internationally and would be played in the Olympics. At one time, each of Ruddy's sons Joe, Steve, Joe Jr., Ray, Don, and Steve played "soft" water polo for the New York Athletic Club. In 1902, he served as a Junior clerk in the Municipal Civil Service Commission, and was later appointed as a physical examiner. While serving in the Civil Service, he dismissed many non-swimmers who were serving as lifeguards. He retired from his position as examiner in 1935. After his retirement around 1939, he was indicted for taking unlawful fees for civil service jobs.

Ruddy was the father of 1928 Olympic swimmer Ray Ruddy who also participated in the 1932 and 1936 Olympics. Ruddy had two other sons and two daughters. His oldest son and namesake, Joseph Ruddy Jr. was a U.S. Navy admiral, swam for the Naval Academy at Annapolis and was the recipient of a Navy Cross as an aviator in WWII.

He died at his home in Far Rockaway, New York on November 11, 1962, at the age of 84. He had been living on Newport Avenue in Far Rockaway. He was survived by his wife Mary, two of his three sons, and two daughters. A Mass was held on November 14 at St. Frances de Sales Church in Rockaway Park, Queens.

== Honors ==
In 1977, he was inducted into the USA Water Polo Hall of Fame. He was also a member of the International Swimming Hall of Fame. He received a special medal of recognition for having saved 200 lives during his career as a lifeguard.

== See also ==
- List of athletes with Olympic medals in different disciplines
- List of members of the International Swimming Hall of Fame
- List of multi-sport athletes
- List of multi-sport champions
- List of Olympic medalists in swimming (men)
