= James Steen (water polo) =

American water polo player (1876–1949)

- Steen with the NYAC Water Polo Team, 1907

Personal information
- Nationality: American
- Born: November 19, 1876 New York City, United States
- Died: June 25, 1949 (aged 72) New York City, United States
- Occupation: Insurance broker
- Spouse: Rebecca Sherriff
- Children: 2 sons, 1 daughter

Sport
- Sport: Water polo
- Position: Lined up at Left Goal; Possibly Driver or Wing
- Club: New York Athletic Club
- Coached by: George Sundstrom (NYAC)
Medal record
Representing the United States
Olympic Games
Gold medal – first place	1904 St. Louis	Team competition

James J. Steen (November 19, 1876 – June 25, 1949) was an American water polo player who competed with the New York Athletic Club and won a team gold medal in the 1904 St. Louis Olympics. He later lived in New Rochelle, New York and worked as an insurance broker with offices in New York.

James Steen was born November 19, 1876 in New York City. He competed in Water Polo with the New York Athletic Club coached by Gus Sundstrom. Through his many years as a member of the New York Athletic Club, in addition to competing in swimming, Steen participated in football and rowing competitions with the club. Representing the NYAC on August 18, 1900, he was entered as a novice in the 75-yard swim and the plunge for distance competition at the Atlantic Yacht Club in Sea Gate, New York.

During the Spanish-American War in 1898, Steen was stationed with the New York National Guard's 22nd Regiment.

== 1904 St. Louis Olympics ==
At the age of 27, Steen won a gold medal in the 1904 Summer Olympics in the water polo team competition as a member of the New York Athletic Club team. The 1904 U.S. water polo gold medalist team from the New York Athletic Club included David Bratton, George Van Cleaf, Leo Goodwin, Louis Handley, David Hesser, Joe Ruddy, and Steen. The water polo competition was held at the man-made Life Saving Exhibition Lake in St. Louis's Forest Park. America's Chicago Athletic Association took the silver medal, and the Missouri Athletic Club took the bronze. In the Water Polo semi-final round, Steen's New York Athletic Club team soundly defeated the Missouri Athletic Club team by a score of 5–0 on September 5, 1904 In the final round, the New York Athletic Club defeated the Chicago Athletic Association Club by a score of 6–0 on September 6. Louis Handley, the future swimming instructor for the Women's Swimming Association of New York served as a key player and Captain with the New York Athletic Club team.

On November 25, 1905 at the NYAC pool, Steen's New York Athletic Club defeated the Water Polo team from the Brookline Swimming Club of Boston by a score of 5-0. Steen played left goal, the equivalent of a modern driver position for the New York Club.

=== 1907 NYAC WP team ===
New York Athletic Club Water Polo Team, 1907

In the photo at left, Steen is shown with the New York Athletic Club water polo team in July, 1907. The team competed in the 1907 AAU swimming championship at Jamestown at the Grand Basin at the Smith Harbor and Discovery Landing. Steen is featured on the far right of the bottom row with the winged foot jersey of the New York Athletic Club. Coach Gus Sundstrom is standing in the center of the top row. L.B. Handley helped Captain the team in 1907, and later coached the New York Swimming Association. A complete list of the 1907 team standing at the photo at left from left to right include C.D. Trubenbach, L. B. Goodwin, Coach Gus Sundstrom, J. B. Naething, and E.E. Wenk Jr., and seated; from left to right, J.A. Ruddy, Ogden M. Reed, Captain Lous De Breda Handley, and Steen. J.A. Ruddy and Leo "Bud". Goodwin also won a gold medal in the 4x100 yard freestyle relay in 1904. An exceptional program, between 1898-1911, the New York AC team won all but one of the AAU Water Polo titles for indoor and outdoor competition.

=== Marriage and later life ===
On November 25, 1909, Steen married Rebecca Sherriff of Brooklyn.

In later life, Steen worked as an insurance broker officing in New York City.

Steen died at 72 on June 25, 1949 at St. Elizabeth's Hospital in New York City, following a week-long illness. He had served as a member of the First Presbyterian Church and with the Echo Bay Yacht Club, where he had earlier helped organize swimming competitions and meets in Echo Bay. Steen was survived by a daughter, two sons, and four grandchildren. He lived on Weyman Avenue in New Rochelle, New York for twenty-five years, where his sons, in their High School Senior year, had each Captained the New Rochelle High School Football team.
