= Leo Goodwin (swimmer) =

American Olympic swimmer, diver, and water polo player (1883–1957)

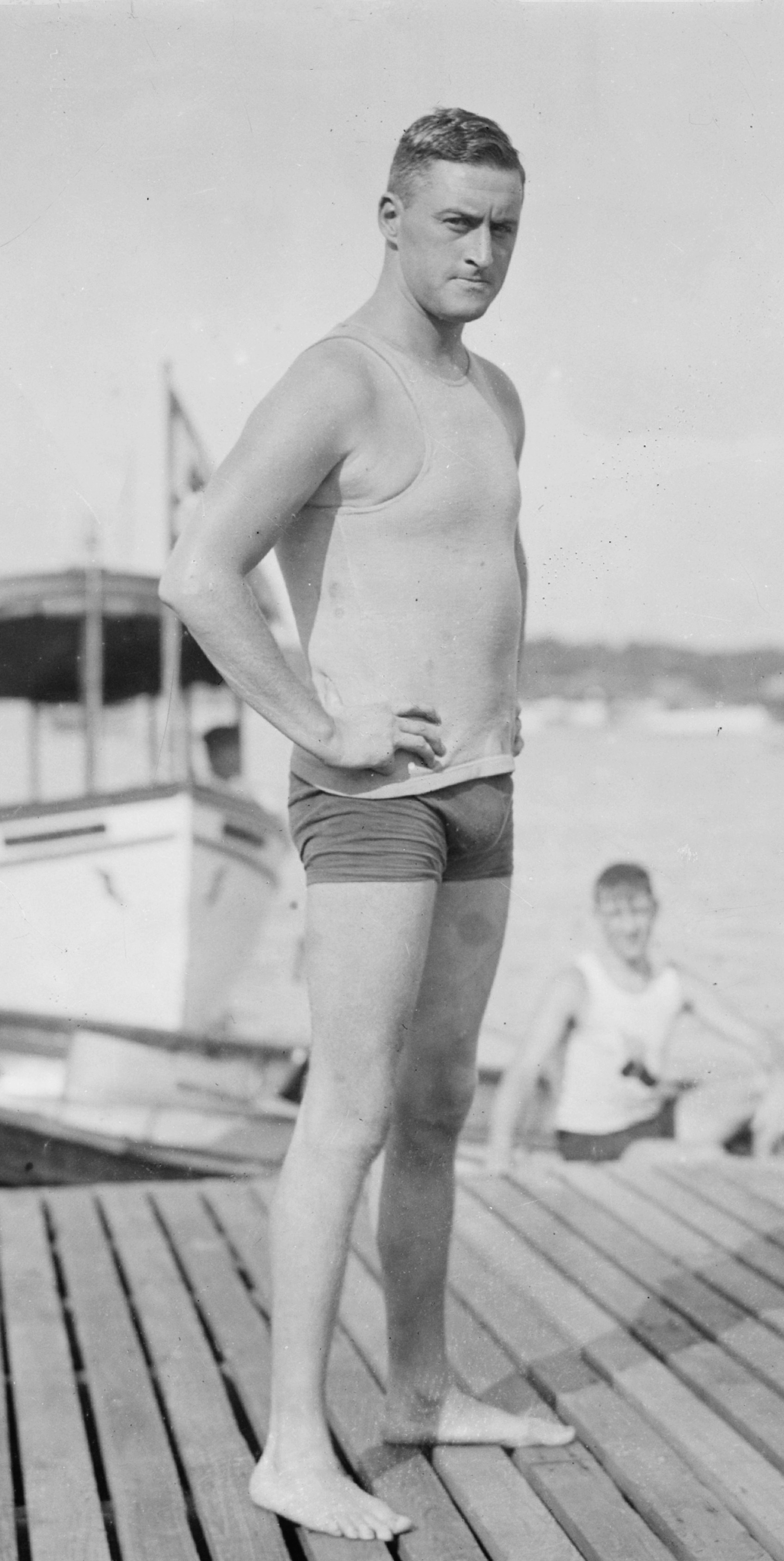
- Goodwin c. 1912

Personal information
- Full name: Leo Joseph Goodwin
- Nickname: "Budd"
- National team: United States
- Born: November 13, 1883 New York City, U.S.
- Died: May 25, 1957 (aged 73) New York City, U.S.

Sport
- Sport: Swimming
- Strokes: Freestyle, water polo
- Club: New York Athletic Club NYAC
- Coach: Gus Sundstrom (NYAC)
Medal record
Men's swimming
Representing the United States
Olympic Games
| Gold medal – first place | 1904 St. Louis | 4×50 yd freestyle |
| Gold medal – first place | 1904 St. Louis | Water polo |
| Bronze medal – third place | 1904 St. Louis | Plunge for distance |
| Bronze medal – third place | 1908 London | 4×200 m freestyle |

Leo Joseph "Bud" Goodwin (November 13, 1883 – May 25, 1957) was an American swimmer, diver, and water polo player who competed for the New York Athletic Club. He participated for the U.S. in the 1904 and 1908 Summer Olympics and won two gold and two bronze medals in events that encompassed all three disciplines.

Goodwin was born on November 13, 1883, in New York City, and like many outstanding swimmers in the area, swam for the New York Athletic Club, than managed by Hall of Fame Coach, Gus Sundstrom. Goodwin's training and competition were abruptly interrupted when he nearly lost his arm from blood poisoning at age 22. Dr. Dave Hennen, a swimmer from his club and surgeon, dissected his entire forearm while cleaning it from poison, then re-assembled the veins, muscles and ligaments. Goodwin quickly recovered, but was unfit for the 1906 Intercalated Games scheduled to be held in Athens.

== Swimming highlights ==
In his career, he won over 50 National and New York Metropolitan championships. Goodwin won outdoor AAU titles in 1904 in the 440 yard freestyle, in 1901 and 1907 in the 880-yard freestyle, and the 1-mile freestyle in 1910 and in 1912–14. He won outdoor AAU titles in long-distance swimming in 1910 and 1915. His indoor AAU title wins came in the 100-yard freestyle in 1903, and in the 500-yard freestyle in 1908. He was an accomplished marathon swimmer, and gained local notoriety for winning New York's Battery-to-Coney Island race.

== Olympics ==
=== 1904 St. Louis ===
At the 1904 St. Louis Olympics, Goodwin won a gold medal swimming for the NYAC team in the 4x50-yard freestyle relay in a time before only meter distances were part of Olympic competition. He also won a gold medal in Water Polo competing with the NYAC Water Polo team, which consisted of David Bratton, George Van Cleaf, Goodwin, Louis Handley, David Hesser, Joe Ruddy, and James Steen.

Goodwin placed third, taking a bronze medal, in the "Plunge for distance", gliding a measured 17.37 meters in a 60-second timed interval after a dive of no more than 18 inches from the surface of the pool where the arms and legs were not used to gain momentum. The event is considered a "dive" event by swimming historians, though it was only included in the 1904 Olympics. In events where he did not medal, he placed fourth in the 440-yard freestyle event, placed fifth in the 50-yard freestyle, and sixth in the 100-yard freestyle.

=== 1908 London ===
At the 1908 London Olympics, the first Olympics to use a 100-meter pool, he won a bronze medal in the 4x200-meter freestyle relay, a more modern event. He swam only in the first preliminary round in the individual 400-meter freestyle event and did not advance. In the 400, the favorites Great Britain and Austalasia, took the gold and silver medals respectively. The United States swimmers were far back in their finish times.

=== 1907 NYAC WP team ===
New York Athletic Club Water Polo Team, 1907

In the team shown at left Goodwin is standing second from left with the New York Athletic Club water polo team in July, 1907. The team competed in the 1907 AAU swimming championship at Jamestown at the Grand Basin at the Smith Harbor and Discovery Landing. Coach Gus Sundstrom is standing in the center of the top row. L.B. Handley helped Captain the team in 1907, and later coached the New York Swimming Association. A complete list of the 1907 team standing at the photo at left from left to right include C.D. Trubenbach, L. B. Goodwin, Coach Gus Sundstrom, J. B. Naething, and E.E. Wenk Jr., and seated; from left to right, Joseph (Joe) A. Ruddy, Ogden M. Reed, Captain Louis De Breda Handley, and James Steen. J.A. Ruddy was part of the gold medal team that competed with Goodwin in the 4x100 yard freestyle relay in 1904. An exceptional program, between 1898-1911, the New York AC water polo team won all but one of the AAU Water Polo titles for indoor and outdoor competition.

=== 1912 Stockholm ===
At the 1912 Stockholm Olympics, he was entered in three events, but did not swim.

At the 1915 Panama–Pacific International Exposition Goodwin set an outdoor record by swimming 3.5 miles in 1 hour and 38 minutes in San Francisco Bay. He won by 200 yards. He later received the Congressional Gold Medal, the highest peacetime award in the United States, for rescuing people from drowning at Newport News, Virginia. He retired from active competitions in 1922, but continued swimming through his seventies.

He worked on his father's Manhattan Island excursion ferry for many years, before later retiring to Palm Beach.

=== Honors ===
Goodwin was awarded the Congressional Gold Medal, the highest U.S. peacetime award, for rescuing people from drowning at Newport News, Virginia. The award is not to be confused with the Congressional Medal of Honor which is usually awarded only to active members of the Military.

In 1971 he was inducted into the International Swimming Hall of Fame as an "Honor Swimmer".

He died at St. Vincents Hospital in New York on May 25, 1957. He was survived by a son, Tommy Goodwin who was a New York State golf championship five times.

== See also ==
- List of athletes with Olympic medals in different disciplines
- List of members of the International Swimming Hall of Fame
- List of multi-sport athletes
- List of multi-sport champions
- List of Olympic medalists in swimming (men)
