= Gus Sundstrom =

American swimming coach (1858-1936)

- "Professor" Gus Sundstrom

Biographical details
- Born: October 28, 1858; Brooklyn, New York, USA
- Died: September 9, 1936 (aged 77); New York, New York

Playing career
- 1885-1895: New York Athletic Club
- Positions: Swimmer, Water Polo player

Coaching career (HC unless noted)
- 1890-1935: New York Athletic Club; Swim and Water Polo Coach
- 1890-: New York Public Schools; Swimming supervisor
- 1904: U.S. Olympic Water Polo Team

Accomplishments and honors

Championships
- 1904 Olympic Gold Medal (NYAC water polo)

Awards
- International Swimming Hall of Fame; US Water Polo Hall of Fame

Records
- 13-3 (US Sr. National Water Polo Team)

Gus Sundstrom (October 28, 1858 – September 9, 1936) was the first swim instructor and swim coach at Manhattan's New York Athletic Club (NYAC), and served for fifty years, from 1885-1935, mentoring several world record holders and Olympians. He was equally adept coaching water polo at NYAC, and led his teams to national titles, and a 1904 St. Louis Olympic Gold medal. An accomplished long-distance swimmer who helped develop and pass-on the modern front crawl to his students, he was considered by swimming historians to be "the first great American coach of the modern era".

== Early life ==
Sundstrom was born on October 28, 1858 in Brooklyn, New York, to Mrs. and Mr. J.F. Sundstrom, a Scandinavian sea Captain. He attended public schools in Brooklyn, and began to swim at an early age. He participated in long distance races in New York City rivers and later Manhattan Harbor while competing for cash purses. Following his father's example, he set out to sea as part of his education, and sailed on ships that circumnavigated the globe more than once. A hearty lad in a rough world, he took up boxing while at sea as a youth. His own years as a swimming and water polo competitor spanned from 1885-1895, though he continued to swim well into his 60's.

=== Adopting the front crawl ===
During his travels in his early years he was fabled to have swum a one-mile race in the Columbia River, against Big Red Fish, a Pacific Coast Indian. Sundstrom lost badly, but observed that the Indian swam with his arms recovering out of the water and with rapid thrashing legs, now called a flutter kick. The Indian's stroke and kicking technique were quite different from the breaststroke and sidestroke used by Sundstrom, and commonly used by American swimmers at the time. Sundstrom adopted the new stroke technique and tried to improve upon it, soon experiencing increasing success in competition.

=== Early distance swims ===
He may have been best known for his fabled win in 1886 against Englishman William Walker "John" Robinson, a Scottman by birth and 1908 Olympic Silver medalist for Great Britain. The contest was then considered the long distance world swimming championship, though it was held long before sanctions for such events existed. The race, of very roughly ten miles, started at the Battery in New York on the Southern tip of Manhattan Island. It terminated at Oak Point, near Hart Island, a railroad link in the Bronx in Manhattan Harbor and was swum with the Statue of Liberty around the mid-point. In addition to capturing the coveted title, Gus took home a side bet of $250.00.

At the peak of his long-distance feats, in the August of 1885, he was the first person to circle Manhattan Island in four hours, a distance of 16 miles from the Battery to High Bridge, a swim he accomplished with Denis F. Butler. In training for the feat, on July 26, 1885, Sundstrom swam thirteen miles in 3 hours, 37 minutes, from McComb's Dam Bridge on the Hudson to the Battery. Manhattan Harbor area swims of varying distances are still performed today. A Rose Pitonof swim in Manhattan Harbor, which commemorates the 1910 Manhattan Harbor swim by a New York-based marathon swimmer of the same name, spans 17 miles, but with different starting and ending points. Marathon swimmer Diana Nyad was a record holder in 1975, of a longer 28-mile Manhattan Harbor swim, which was broken not long after.

=== New York Athletic Club ===
When the New York Athletic Club was being constructed in Manhattan in 1885, Sundstrom was first hired to work the baths that February, and then served as their inaugural swimming instructor beginning in 1890. Greatly popularizing the sport, the championship water polo matches he coached, drew audiences that averaged 14,000, though spectators considered it a "rough sport". With his reputation growing as a result of his work as NYAC instructor, and his many wins as a local long distance swimmer, Sundstrom was selected to supervise swimming for the New York City Schools. In this position, he was reputed to have taught over 100,000 children to swim during his career.

=== New York Athletic Club Water Polo team ===
New York Athletic Club Water Polo Team, 1907

In the team shown at left, Sundstrom, around the age of 48, is standing in the back row third from left with his New York Athletic Club water polo team in July, 1907. The team competed in the 1907 AAU swimming championship at Jamestown at the Grand Basin at the Smith Harbor and Discovery Landing. L.B. Handley helped Captain the team in 1907, and later coached the New York Swimming Association. A complete list of the 1907 team standing at the photo at left from left to right include C.D. Trubenbach, L. B. Goodwin, Coach Sundstrom, J. B. Naething, and E.E. Wenk Jr., and seated; from left to right, Joseph (Joe) A. Ruddy, Ogden M. Reed, Captain Louis De Breda Handley, and James Steen. J.A. Ruddy was part of the gold medal team that competed with Goodwin in the 4x100 yard freestyle relay in 1904. An exceptional program as coached by Sundstrom, between 1898-1911, the New York Athletic Club water polo team won all but one of the AAU Water Polo titles for indoor and outdoor competition.

=== Outstanding swimmers ===
The Olympic swimmers Sundstrom coached at the New York Athletic Club included Charles Daniels an eight-time Olympic medalist, 1904 two-time Olympic Gold medalist Joe Ruddy and 1904 two-time Olympic gold medalist Leo "Bud" Goodwin. The world records and national titles of his championship swimmers could be partly attributed to Sundstrom's careful training techniques and his work refining and improving the front crawl stroke.

Sundstrom died of heart disease at 77 after an illness of several months on Thursday, September 9, 1936 at his home on 179th street in New York City. Services were held on Sunday, September 12 at the Church of the Incarnation, at 175th Street in the Bronx. He was buried at Holy Cross Cemetery in East Flatbush, Kings County, New York. In addition to his unique accomplishments as a swim coach, in New York he was known for being the first person to swim around Manhattan Island. His survivors included his widow Ellen McDonald Sundstrom, two daughters, a son George, and a brother. Many New York area newspapers carried news of his passing, and many newspapers worldwide distributed by Ripley's Believe it or Not featured a description of a stunt he performed of swimming 75 yards underwater with a lit cigar in his mouth, and surfacing with the cigar still lit.

=== Honors ===
He was elected to the U.S. Water Polo Hall of Fame in 1988 and was admitted to the International Swimming Hall of Fame as a Pioneer member in 1995.

As part of an enduring legacy, in 1901, he authored the first manual on Water Polo as part of the Spaulding Sports Library.
