= Plunge for distance =

Former diving event

Plunging
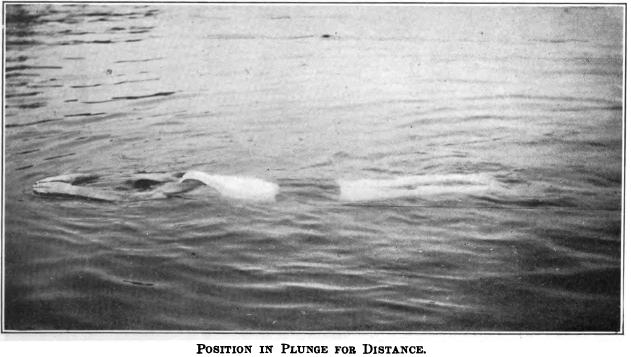
- Competitor floating after plunging (1918)
- First played: 1800s. English championship created in 1883.

Characteristics
- Type: Aquatics

Presence
- Olympic: 1904 only

The plunge for distance is a diving event that enjoyed its greatest popularity in the 19th and early part of the 20th century, even being included as an official event in the 1904 Summer Olympics. By the 1920s, it began to lose its popularity and slowly disappeared from U.S. and English swim competitions.

== Description ==
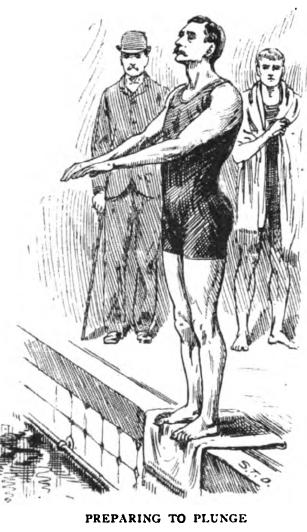
Preparing to plunge

According to the 1920 Official Swimming Guide of the American Swimming Association, the plunge for distance "is a dive from a stationary take-off which is free from spring from a height of 18 inches above the water. Upon reaching the water the plunger glides face downward for a period of 60 seconds without imparting any propulsion to the body from the arms and legs." To determine the total distance traveled, the measurement was taken from the farthest part of the body from the start, "opposite a point at right angles to the base line." Generally, being fat was an advantage in the sport. The 60-second limitation appears to have been instituted at the English Plunging Championship around 1893.

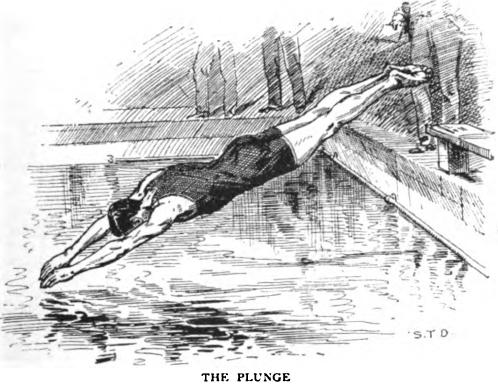
Plunging

In later years, the plunge was subject to criticism as "not an athletic event at all," but instead a competition favoring "mere mountains of fat who fall in the water more or less successfully and depend upon inertia to get their points for them." John Kiernan, sports writer for the New York Times, once described the event as the "slowest thing in the way of athletic competition", and that "the stylish-stout chaps who go in for this strenuous event merely throw themselves heavily into the water and float along like icebergs in the ship lanes." Similarly, an 1893 English report on the sport noted that spectators were not enamored of it, as the diver "moves after thirty or forty feet at a pace somewhat akin to a snail, and to the uninitiated the contests appear absolute wastes of time."

== History ==
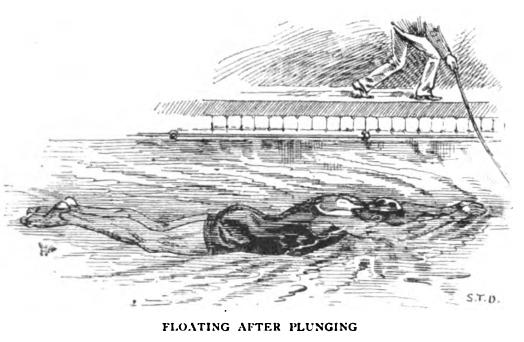
Floating after plunging

The exact origins of the sport are unclear, though it likely derives from the act of diving at the start of swimming races. The 1904 book Swimming by Ralph Thomas notes English reports of plunging records dating back to at least 1865. The 1877 edition to British Rural Sports by John Henry Walsh makes note of a "Mr. Young" plunging 56 feet in 1870, and also states that 25 years prior, a swimmer named Drake could cover 53 feet.

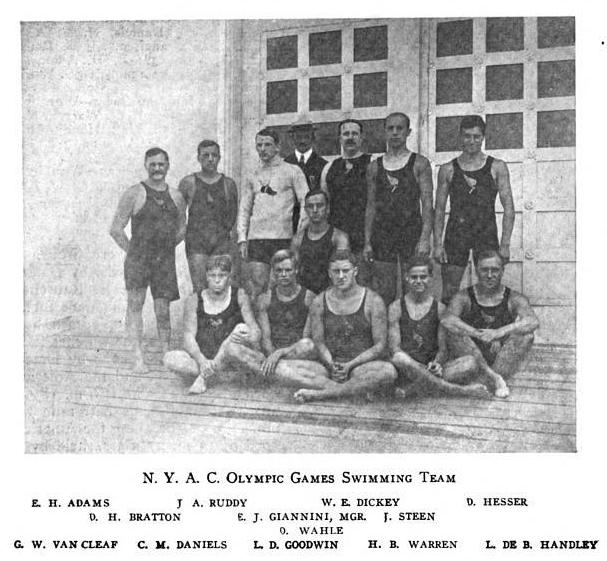
1904 New York Athletic Club Olympic swim team, including all three plunging medalists, William Dickey (back row near center, with mustache), Edgar Adams (back row, far left) and Leo Goodwin (front row, center)

The English Amateur Swimming Association (at the time called the Swimming Association of Great Britain) first started a "plunging championship" in 1883. By 1900 the "plunge for distance" event was being regularly mentioned in reports on U.S. swimming meets, and was mentioned in the New York Times and Brooklyn Eagle at least as far back as 1898.

The event is best remembered today for its one-and-only Olympic appearance in 1904. William Dickey of the USA won the gold medal with a distance of 62 feet 6 inches, which remains the Olympic record. However, there were only five participants in the event, all from the United States and the New York Athletic Club. Dickey's teammates Edgar Adams and Leo Goodwin took the silver and bronze medals, respectively.

Dickey's Olympic victory was far short of the world record at the time, which for a 60-second limit competition had been set at 79 feet 3 inches by W. Taylor of Bootle, England in September 1902. (Without a time limit, Taylor had also traveled 82 feet in 73.6 seconds.)

Though it never returned to the Olympics, the event remained a standard event in U.S. amateur and collegiate sporting events for some time. By 1912, S.B. Willis, a plunger at the University of Pennsylvania covered 80 feet in 60 seconds, breaking the prior U.S. record of 75 feet 11 inches held by Millard Kaiser.

By 1917 several attempts had been made to abolish the event at college and other competitions in the United States, and the NCAA dropped it in 1925. The English A.S.A. reportedly ceased holding its official plunging championship after 1937, though some sources say it ran through 1946.

Female swimmers also competed in the plunge. American swimmer Charlotte Boyle (also a 1920 Olympian) set the American record a few times between 1917 and 1920, reaching 66 feet at an exhibition meet in March 1920. Two Detroit Northern High School students, Helen Nolan and Dorothy McWood, set records in the early 1920s, which McWood reportedly setting a new American record of 66 feet 10 inches in April 1922. Hilda Dand set a new world record of 71 feet in 1925.

On the men's side, Bootle's last record of 82 feet 7 inches set in 1906 stood for 14 years, until broken by two inches by 17-year-old Fred Schwedt of Detroit in 1920. English swimmer Francis Parrington smashed that record in 1926 by traveling 85 feet 6 inches, and in 1933 he hit 86 feet 8 inches, which remains the world record.

In 1941, sportswriter John Kieran referenced the sport as once "a regular event in swimming meets" but "now abandoned."

There is some evidence that the quirky nature of the sport is occasionally gaining the attention of modern swimmers. In June 2012, Danish female swimmer Laura Funch successfully plunged the full length of a 25-meter (82-foot) pool in approximately 101 seconds. Divers approached at the 2016 Summer Olympics by the press about the sport also found it fascinating. Furthermore, the Michigan State University men's and women's swimming teams participate in this event annually at their yearly held Alumni Swimming Meet, and keep records for The Plunge event, following the same rules previously used in the early 20th century.

== Variations ==
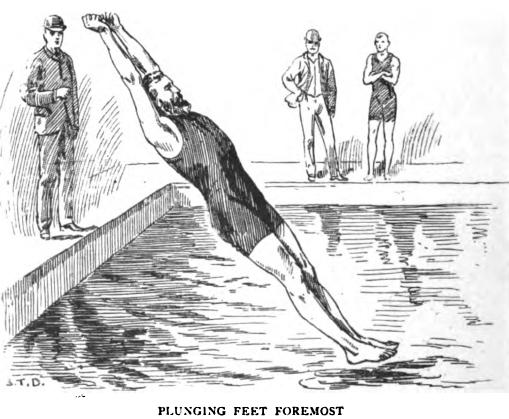
A feet first plunge. Swimmers were cautioned to watch their heads before attempting this older variation.

In shorter pools, a variation of the event was based on how fast the contestant traveled the length of the pool. For example, in 1927, it was reported that R.E. Howell had set a new world's record in a 60-foot tank, going "the length of the pool in 0:14 2–5." Competitions were also reported at 75-foot lengths.

An 1893 English book on swimming also notes the existence of a variation of plunging where participants dive feet first, which it reports to already be rarely practiced.

In all plunge events, because divers could not control where they drifted after diving, typically one diver competed at a time. A 1922 A.A.U. rule change planned to make plungers dive in groups, causing concern that collisions would inevitably occur among participants.

== Records ==
Compiling accurate details of record plunges presents some difficulty, as sometimes records were set in exhibition competitions, and American and English sources do not always seem to check to see whether a claimed "world record" was perhaps only a national record, but available sources do appear to confirm the following records:

=== Men's distance plunge world record (60 second limit) ===
- 86 feet 8 inches. Set on 23 September 1933 by British swimmer F.W. Parrington, the current world record
- 85 feet 10 inches. 1927 by F.W. Parrington
- 85 feet 6 inches. September 1926 by F.W. Parrington
- 84 feet 6 inches, March 7, 1924 by Ted Abrams (US)
- 82 feet 9 inches. 1 March 1920 by American Fred Schwedt.
- 82 feet 7 inches. 5 September 1906 by W. Taylor, at Bootle, England
- 79 feet 3 inches. 3 September 1902 by W. Taylor at Bootle.
- 78 feet 9 inches. 14 September 1898 by British swimmer W. Taylor
- 75 feet 7 inches. 10 October 1888 by British swimmer G.A. Blake at Lambeth Baths**
- 76 feet 3 inches. 15 July 1886 by British swimmer B. Jones (contested)
- 73 feet 1 inch. 15 March 1880, by J. Strickland, in Melbourne. However, dive was reportedly from 5 feet above water.
- 68 feet 4 inches. 17 July 1879 by R. Green, Liverpool.
- 65 feet. 31 July 1879 by T. Ingram, in London. Reported as best on record at the time by British Sporting Life.
- 62 feet 8 inches. 13 October 1876 by H.J. Green, in London (though he was penalized 6 feet for unknown reasons, so accuracy may be dubious)
- 62 feet 7 inches. 1 October 1878 by Horace Davenport.
- 56 feet 8 inches. 1870 by F. Young.
  - The English Plunging Championship instituted a 60-second time limit in 1893, so records prior to 1893 may be for longer times.

=== Men's 60-foot plunge (best time) ===
- 14.4 sec. (handheld) 16 February 1927 by Richard E. Howell (Chicago).
- 15.4 sec. 1923 by Nathaniel T. Guernsey, Jr. of Yale University. (also set records in 75-foot plunge)
- 15.6 sec. 27 February 1918 by John P. Lichter.
- 16.8 sec. 30 January 1918 by Benjamin H. Princell.
- 17.4 sec, J.P. Lichter.
- 18.8 sec. 26 February 1916 by J.C.Redmond
- 19 sec. 16 February 1916 by John P. Lichter.
- 19.2 sec. 8 December 1915 by Craig Redmond.
- 21.6 sec. 25 February 1914 by John P. Lichter.

=== Women's distance plunge record (60-second limit) ===
- 71 feet. 1925 by Hilda Dand of Westminster, England
- 70 feet 6 inches. 1933 by Dorothy Rennie in Vancouver, is likely the Canadian record.
- 68 feet 1 inch. 1920 by Hilda Dand.
- 66 feet 10 inches. Set in April 1922 by Detroit high school student Dorothy McWood. Reported as a world record in United States, though Dand may have plunged 68 feet 1 in. in 1920 (see above), in which case it would be only an American record. In December 1924, however, the American men's college committee on swimming records officially stated that the American scholastic record was 62 feet 8 inches, set by McWood.
- 66 feet. Late 1919 by Hilda Dand in England. Charlotte Boyle matched this length in March 1920 in the United States.

=== Women's 60-foot plunge (best time) ===
- 46 seconds, Alice Van Hoe, reported as United States collegiate record as of 31 December 1924.

== Notable plungers ==
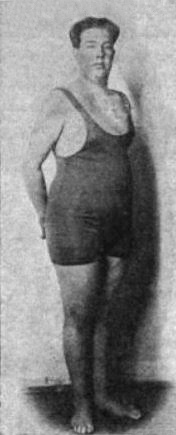
Fred Schwedt, set a new world record in 1920 at age 17

- Edgar Adams – Silver medalist at 1904 Summer Olympics, he subsequently set the U.S. plunge record a few times, last setting a record of 70 feet in December 1906.
- G.A. Blake – English plunger who set record mark of 75 feet 7 inches on 10 October 1888.
- Charlotte Boyle – set U.S. female records in the plunge, also competed as a swimmer in the 1920 Olympics.
- Horace Davenport (died 1925) – English plunger who won competitions in the 1870s and 1880s, including 1884, 1885, and 1886 English Plunging Championship. Also known for plunging feet first. Davenport also was known for endurance swims.
- William Dickey – U.S. plunger from the New York Athletic Club, and winner of the 1904 Olympic gold medal
- Fred Schwedt (1902–1986) – U.S. plunger who set a reported world record at age 17 of 82 feet 9 inches on 1 March 1920, beating the 1906 mark set by W. Taylor. Schwedt was reportedly able to coast 75 feet after 90 days of practice.
- W. Taylor – Set world records in both 1-minute and untimed competitions in the late 1890s. On 14 September 1898, he floated 78 feet 9 inches in 60 seconds, setting the English A.S.A. record. In September 1902, he made it to 79 feet 3 inches. On 6 September 1899 he plunged 82 feet in 73.6 seconds. In 1906, he reached 82 feet 7 inches, a world record which stood for many years.
- Francis Winder (F.W.) Parrington – The current world record holder for total distance, whose mark of 86 feet 8 inches was set on 23 September 1933. Parrington reportedly won the English Plunging Championship 11 times between 1926 and 1939. In September 1926, Parrington broke Taylor's (and presumably Schwedt's) distance record, setting a new mark of 85 feet 6 inches. A police officer, Parrington died during the Liverpool Blitz on 8 May 1941, at age 42. In 1986, he was inducted into the International Swimming Hall of Fame. Parrington's son was also a swimmer, and his grandson David Parrington competed for Zimbabwe at the 1980 Summer Olympics.
- Charles H. Pyrah – Set the United States' plunge record of 63 feet in 1902. Finished fifth (and last) in 1904 Olympics.
