= John Collis Browne =

British army officer

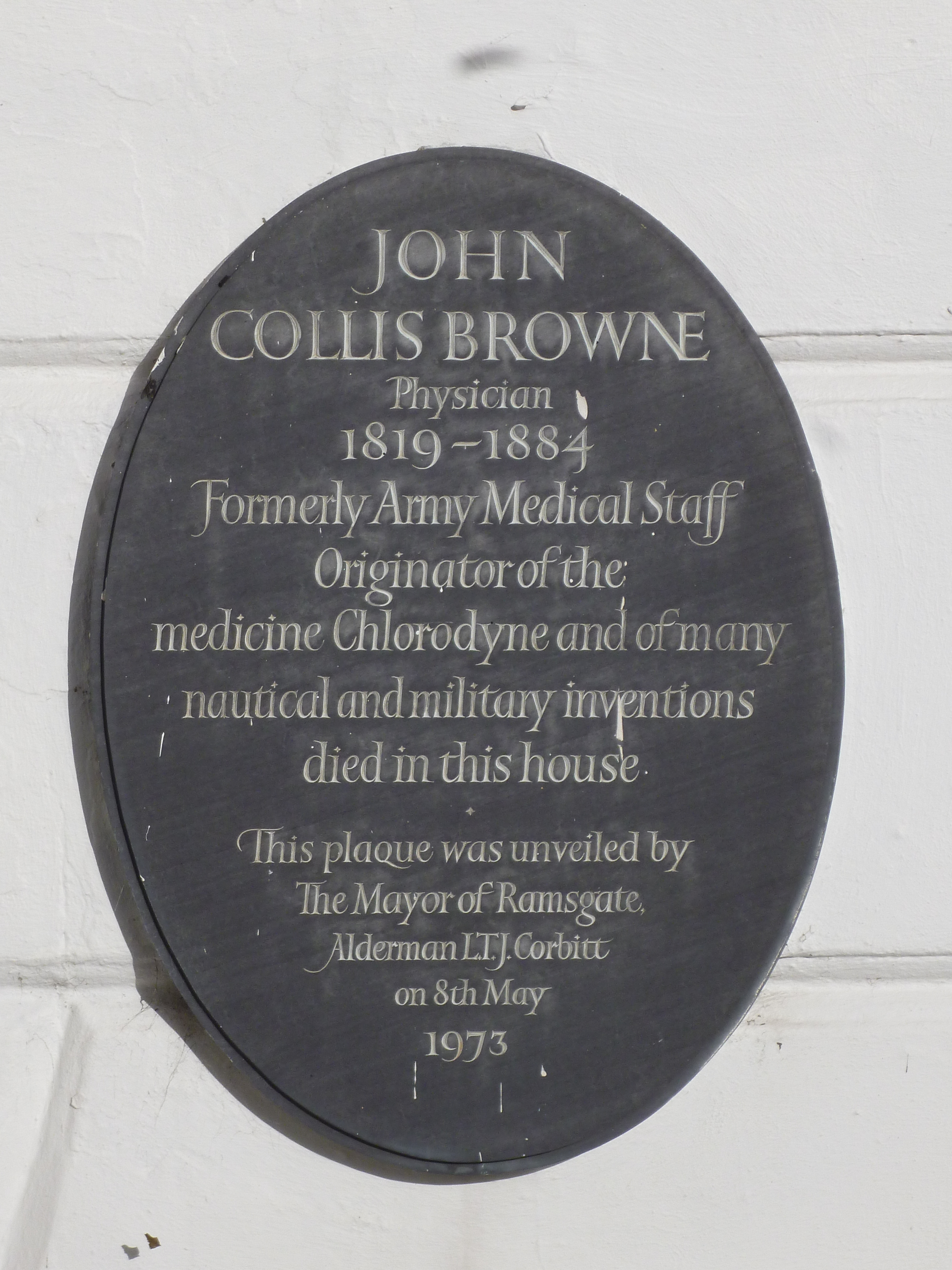
Dr Collis's plaque on 22 Victoria Road, Ramsgate, Kent.

Dr. John Collis Browne MRCS (1819–1884) was a British Army officer, inventor of items for yachts and the originator of the medicine Chlorodyne.

Serving as surgeon with the 98th Regiment of Foot in India in 1848, Browne developed Chlorodyne for use during an outbreak of cholera. It was subsequently used as a general cure in the Crimean War.

In 1856 he left the army and went into partnership with John Thistlewood Davenport, a chemist, then at 33 Great Russell Street, to whom he assigned the sole right to manufacture and market 'Brown's Cough Bottle'. The formulation was abused and its addictive ingredients were reduced as a result; since the Medicines Act of 1968 it has been known as 'J. Collis Browne's Compound'. It was still marketed by J.T. Davenport & Sons – the same family – up until the 1960s. BCB International, named for the product, now focusses on outdoor equipment, including shark repellent, ballistic underwear, bioethanol fuel packs, and emergency packs for lifeboats.

Dr Browne died at Mount Albion House, Ramsgate, on 30 August 1884. He is buried in St Laurence-in-Thanet churchyard in Ramsgate.

Upon Browne's death plans were made by Messrs Davenport to erect a plaque in his memory on the house where he had lived. The plaque was designed by the lettering craftsman William Sharpington and unveiled by the Mayor of Ramsgate on 8 May 1973. Dr N.M. Goodman recorded the event in The Lancet.
