= William Dickey (diver) =

American diver (1874–1944)

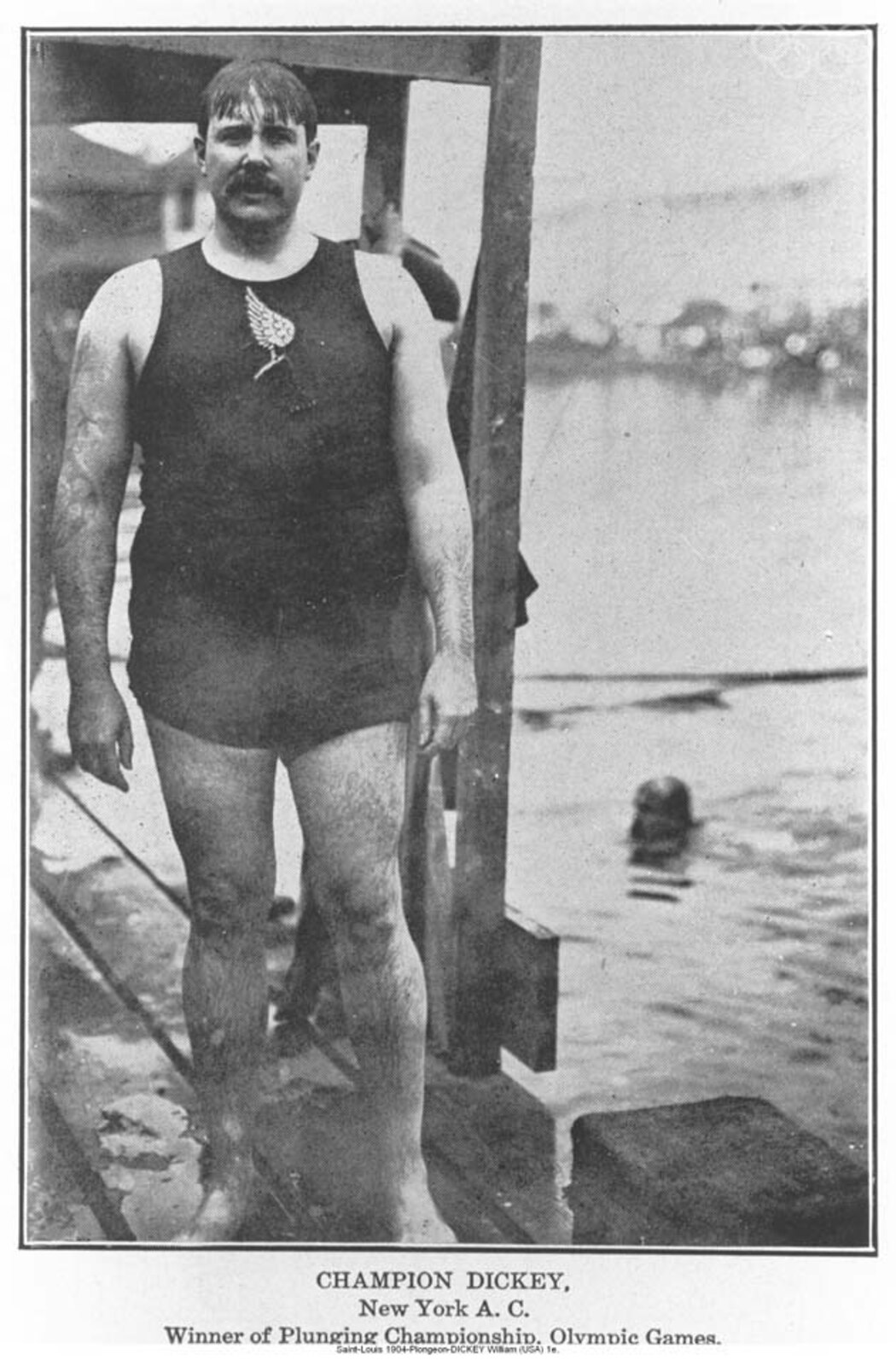

Personal information
- Born: October 20, 1874 New York City, United States
- Died: May 13, 1944 (aged 69) St. Petersburg, Florida, United States
- Resting place: Arlington National Cemetery

Sport
- Sport: Diving
Medal record
Representing the United States
Olympic Games
Gold medal – first place	1904 St. Louis	Plunge for distance

William Eugene "Billy" Dickey (October 20, 1874 – May 13, 1944) was an American diver who competed in the 1904 Summer Olympics. At the 1904 Olympics he won a gold medal in a plunge for distance event.
