= Joseph Constantine Carpue =

English surgeon (1764–1846)

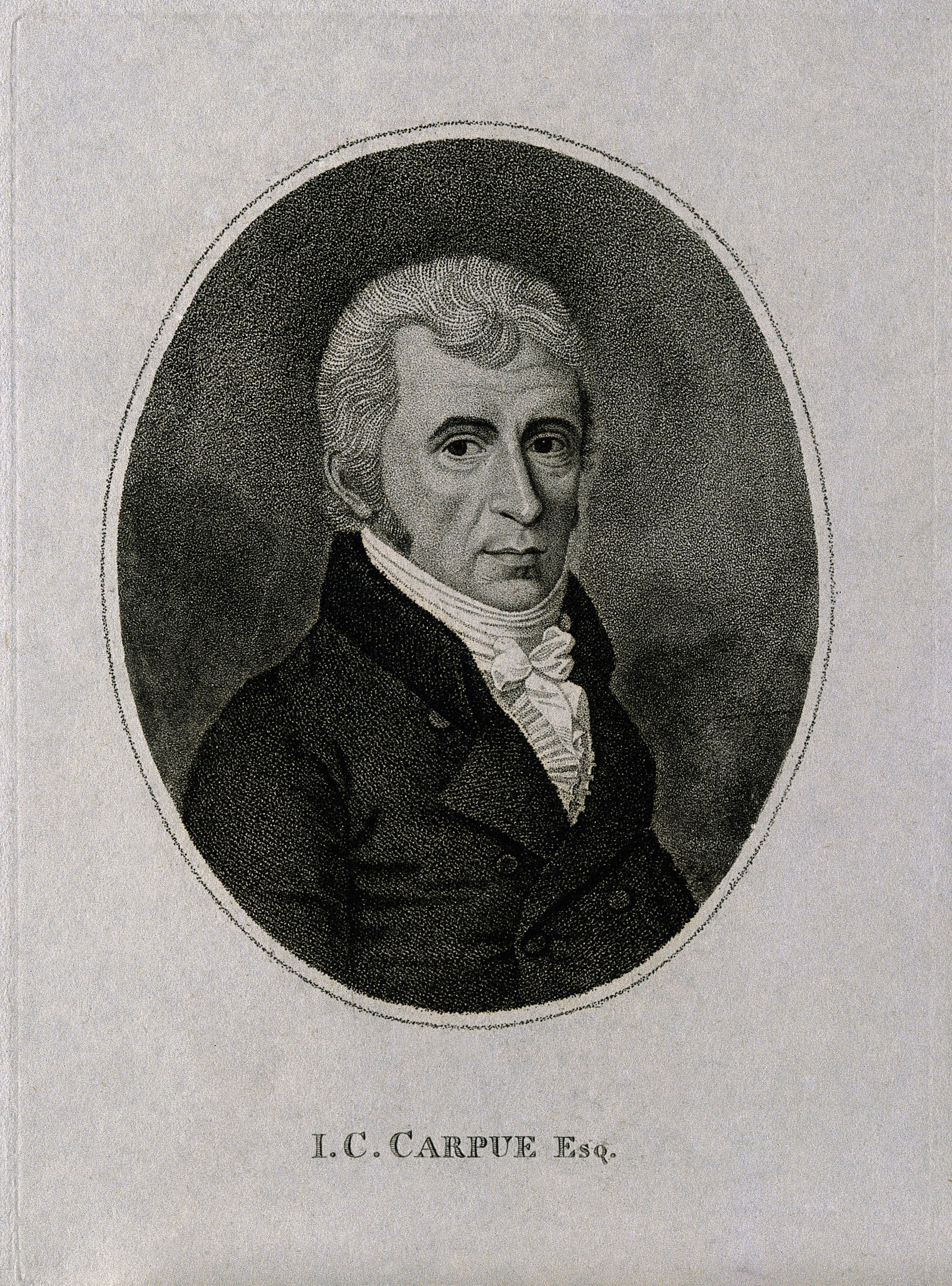
Joseph Constantine Carpue

Joseph Constantine Carpue (4 May 1764 – 30 January 1846) was an English surgeon who was born in London. He was associated with St George's Hospital and Duke of York Hospital in Chelsea. In addition to surgeon, he was a lecturer of anatomy.

Carpue is known for performing the first rhinoplastic surgery in England, using a technique created in India several centuries earlier. The Indian rhinoplastic reconstruction involved using a flap of skin taken from the forehead, and was to become known in Europe as "Carpue's operation". In 1816 Carpue described the procedure in his publication of Account of Two Successful Operations for Restoring a Lost Nose from the Integument of the Forehead.

Carpue was also a pioneer in experimentation with electricity in medicine, which he detailed in his treatise of An Introduction to Electricity and Galvanism, with Cases showing their Effects in the Cure of Disease.

== Works ==
- 1801- Description of the Muscles of the Human Body
- 1803- An Introduction to Electricity and Galvanism, with Cases showing their Effects in the Cure of Disease
- 1816- An Account of Two Successful Operations for Restoring a Lost Nose from the Integument of the Forehead
- 1819- History of the High Operation for the Stone, by Inscision above the Pubis

== See also ==
- Gaspare Tagliacozzi
