= Louis Handley =

American swimmer

Personal information
- Full name: Louis de Breda Handley
- Nickname: "Lou"
- National team: United States
- Born: February 14, 1874 Rome, Italy
- Died: December 28, 1956 (aged 82) New York, New York
- Occupations: Swim Coach; New York Women's Swimming Association; 1924 Olympic Women's Swim Coach

Sport
- Sport: Swimming
- Strokes: Freestyle, water polo
- Club: New York Athletic Club; Member and Coach; New York Women's Swimming Association; Head coach
Medal record
Representing the United States
Men's swimming
Gold medal – first place	1904 St. Louis	4x50 yard freestyle relay
Men's water polo
Gold medal – first place	1904 St. Louis	Team competition

Louis de Breda Handley, originally with birthname Luigi de Breda (February 14, 1874 – December 28, 1956) was an Italian-born American freestyle swimmer, water polo player, and coach who coached the Women's Swimming Association of New York and won gold medals in swimming and water polo in the 1904 Summer Olympics in St. Louis.

== Early life ==
Born in Rome on February 14, 1874, Handley was the son of the American sculptor Francis Montague Handley and his Italian wife. He was registered in Rome as an Italian citizen with the baptismal name of Luigi and the surname of his mother, "de Breda".

In 1896 he fled to New York and added to his name the surname of his father. He worked in a small imports firm and devoted himself to his second passion after hunting, swimming. He was also a great water polo player (his style of shooting was called "jumping salmon").

== Athletic history ==
A versatile athlete, he was the world record holder of the ‘medley race'”, which featured continuous quarter miles of walking, running, horseback riding, bicycling, rowing and swimming, in that order. His time of 16:27 4/5, defeated second-place challenger Joe Ruddy, who competed with him on the U.S. swimming and water polo teams at the 1904 Olympics.

As an exceptional water polo player, Handley played for the New York Athletic Club team that captured all but one AAU indoor and outdoor title between 1898 and 1911. When the former US “softball” rules, which used a smaller ball, were removed from water polo in 1911 in favor of international rules, Handley left water polo but continued his sporting interests as a yachtsman and field dog trainer.

== 1904 Olympic gold medals ==
In the 1904 St. Louis Olympics he won a gold medal swimming third in the 4x50 yard freestyle relay with the team of Joe Ruddy, Budd Goodwin, and Charlie Daniels with a time of 2:04.6. Handley was also a member and Captain of the New York Athletic Club water polo team which won an Olympic gold medal at the 1904 Olympics, and consisted of David Bratton, George Van Cleaf, Leo Goodwin, Handley, David Hesser, Joe Ruddy, and James Steen. Handley competed in the one-mile freestyle but did not finish.

New York Athletic Club Water Polo Team, 1907

In the team photo at left, Handley, who frequently served as team Captain, is shown with the New York Athletic Club water polo team in July, 1907. He is featured third from left on the bottom row holding the water polo ball and wearing the winged foot jersey of the New York Athletic Club. Coach Gus Sundstrom is standing in the center of the top row. A complete list of the 1907 team standing at the photo at left from left to right include C.D. Trubenbach, L. B. Goodwin, Coach Gus Sundstrom, J. B. Naething, and E.E. Wenk Jr., and seated; from left to right, J.A. Ruddy, Ogden M. Reed, Captain Louis De Breda Handley, and James Steen. An exceptional program, between 1898-1911, the New York AC team won all but one of the AAU Water Polo titles for indoor and outdoor competition.

=== Olympic coaching and officiating ===
Handley served as the Head Water Polo referee for the 1920 Olympics.

At the 1924 Olympics, Handley was the first official Head Coach for a U.S. Women's swimming team, along with Bill Bachrach who coached the Men's team. In an important career role, Handley coached the New York Swimming Association.

== Coaching ==
He coached both the New York Athletic Club in swimming and water polo and was the Head Coach for the Women's Swimming Association of New York, founded by Charlotte Epstein in 1917. Epstein herself assisted with certain coaching responsibilities at times as well.

=== Outstanding swimmers coached ===
As a trainer and coach for the Women's Swimming association, he coached Ethelda Bleibtrey to three gold medals at the 1920 Olympics, and Gertrude Ederle to the first English Channel-crossing by a woman in 1926. Other outstanding women swimmers he coached through the Women's Swimming Association included Olympians Gertrude Ederle, a 1924 gold medalist, 1920 gold medalist Aileen Riggin, 1932 gold medalist Eleanor Holm, 1920 and 1924 silver medalist Helen Wainwright, 1928 gold medalist Adelaide Lambert, 1928 gold medalist in diving Helen Meany and as previously noted, Ethelda Bleibtrey. Handley, as well as other American coaches of the period including William Bachrach, advocated a 10-beat kick for each full two strokes of his swimmer's arms. Handley accepted a lower beat count, but approved of increasing the count from 4 kicks per full arm cycle. Many former coaches had considered the American crawl to have originally been designed to have four kicks to one cycle of the arms. Several of Handley's swimmers, including Adelaide Lambert were known for a fast kick, particularly in sprint races.

He wrote the entry dedicated to swimming in the Encyclopædia Britannica. Handley also served as a sportswriter for the New York Herald Tribune, in New York City, covering mostly aquatics.

=== Honors ===
In 1976, he was inducted into the USA Water Polo Hall of Fame, and into the International Swimming Hall of Fame in 1967.

== Publications ==
- Handley, L. De. B., How to play water polo, American Sports Publishing Company, New York, 1910
- Handley, L. De. B., Swimming and Watermanship, The MacMillan Company, New York, 1918
- Handley, L. De. B., Thirty Lessons in Swimming, The Milo Publishing Company, New York

== See also ==
- List of athletes with Olympic medals in different disciplines
- List of members of the International Swimming Hall of Fame
- List of multi-sport athletes
- List of multi-sport champions
- List of Olympic medalists in swimming (men)
