= Maria Medina Coeli =

Italian scientist (1764–1846)

- Born: Maria Candida Medina Coeli; 1764; Chiavenna, Italy
- Died: 1846 (aged 81–82); Pianello Lario, Italy
- Other name: Helena Perpenti
- Occupations: scientist, inventor
- Spouse: Bernardino Lena Perpenti
- Parents: Sebastian Medina Coeli (father); Isabella Battistessa (mother)

Maria Medina Coeli (1764 in Chiavenna – 1846 in Pianello Lario) (also known as Helena Perpenti) was an Italian medical doctor, inventor and botanist.

Maria was the daughter of the medical doctor Sebastian Medina Coeli and his wife Isabella Battistessa Coeli, who belonged to one of the most prominent families in the alpine town where Maria was born. She was the youngest of five children.

== Medical studies ==
Maria took an early interest in medicine as practised by her father, especially the scourge of smallpox and possibilities of early vaccines. To pursue the subject, she corresponded with the physician Luigi Sacco in Milan. She developed a vaccine against smallpox and tested it on herself and her family (not an uncommon procedure at that time), and the introduction of vaccination in the Como area is attributed to her efforts.

... she herself experimented with the same practice in her family, on her own children. It is to her example and her commitment to the promotion of smallpox prophylaxis that we owe the introduction of this practice in the territory of Como.

== Asbestos spinning ==
Coeli also studied natural science. She moved to Como to study but instead married the clerk Bernardino Lena Perpenti in 1788, and became known as Helena Perpenti. "The marriage is followed by the birth of fifteen children in twenty-one years." The many children of her marriage prevented intense studies, but she continued on a smaller scale and invented a way to spin asbestos, which brought her "considerable fame in Italy and abroad."

With the use of a special comb she in fact developed a method of spinning asbestos that allowed her to weave numerous products in which feminine grace and technical-practical ingenuity were perfectly combined: lace, lace, completely fireproof fabrics. Among the various garments she produced, there is also a pair of gloves donated to the viceroy Eugenio Beauharnais.

Using scraps of asbestos, she created a fireproof paper and a special ink, also resistant to fire, made with vitriol and manganese. She sent fireproof test pamphlets that she made to various libraries. She also sent samples to Alessandro Volta, her personal friend.

Coeli's inventions caught the attention of industrial practitioners in Italy and beyond. For her work, she was awarded the silver medal (1806) and then the gold medal (1807) from the National Institute of Milan. After news of her work reached the Society of Encouragement for National Industry in Paris, it is said it "attracted the attention and admiration of Napoleon".

== Botanical contributions ==
Using the Linnean classification system, Coeli (then widely known as Helena Perpenti) studied the flora of the Lario valleys near Lake Como. In 1817, she found a specimen of campanula which later became known as: campanula Perpentiae. After her discovery of this rare species of flower was published, she earned a place, as a distinguished naturalist, in the French Dictionary of Inventions.
