= Chlorodyne =

Nineteenth-century medication

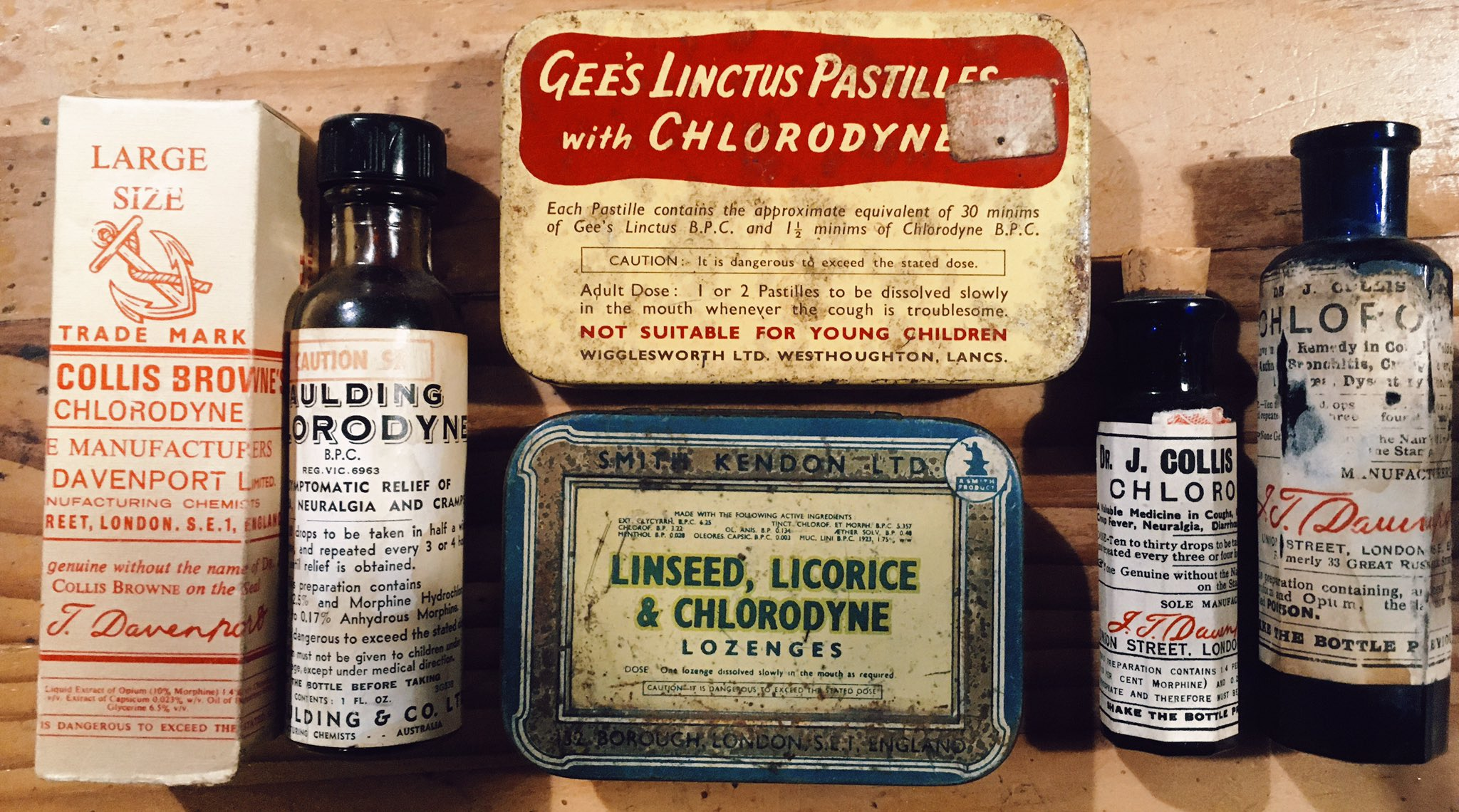
Chlorodyne medicine bottles and chlorodyne lozenge tins showing various brands from the UK and Australia

1891 advertisement for J. Collis Browne's Chlorodyne

1891 advertisement for a rival brand of Chlorodyne

Chlorodyne was one of the best known patent medicines sold in the British Isles. It was invented in the 19th century by a Dr. John Collis Browne, a doctor in the British Indian Army; its original purpose was in the treatment of cholera. Browne sold his formula to the pharmacist John Thistlewood Davenport, who advertised it widely, as a treatment for cholera, diarrhea, insomnia, neuralgia, migraines, etc. As its principal ingredients were a mixture of laudanum (an alcoholic solution of opium), tincture of cannabis, and chloroform, it readily lived up to its claims of relieving pain, as a sedative, and for the treatment of diarrhea.

== Imitations ==
Chlorodyne sold extremely well for many years; as its active ingredients were well known, local chemists' shops would also make up cheaper generic versions for sale to their customers. Here is an example of such a generic formulation, from Materia Medica by William Hale-White & A.H. Douthwaite, 21st edition (1932):

"Tinctura Chloroformi et Morphinæ Composita intended to be an imitation of the proprietary medicine called chlorodyne. Mix chloroform 75, tincture of capsicum 25, tincture of Indian hemp 100, oil of peppermint 2 and glycerin 250 with alcohol (20 per cent) 450. Dissolve morphine hydrochloride 10 in the mixture. Add to it diluted hydrocyanic acid 50 and enough alcohol (90 per cent) to make 1000. Strength. 1 millilitre contains chloroform 7.5 centimils; morphine hydrochloride 1 centigram; acidum hydrocyanicum dilutum 5 centimils.

Dose 5 to 15 minims - 0.2 to 1ml

Besides the generics, a number of rival sellers marketed their own branded versions of the formula, brands such as "Freeman's", "Teasdale's", and "Towle's". It can be seen from the illustrations that the authenticity of these rival brands was hotly contested. Another version, Shinyaku (lit. "divine-medicine"), was developed in Japan and sold domestically for many years, although its most toxic ingredients were replaced over time for reasons of safety and legality.

== Criticism from the medical community ==
Between 1861 and 1862 The British Medical Journal featured several pieces of criticism of chlorodyne including one lead article that featured it as an example of "Professional Testimonial-Mongers". Alongside this are two letters from practising doctors. Both include significant distaste at the repeated inclusion of advertisement for Chlorodyne from Dr. Browne in a previous issue. Furthermore scepticism of its usefulness over other opioids and a general distaste for its homeopathic advertisement is a consistent theme.

== Decline ==
Though the drug was effective in many ways, its high opiate content also made it very addictive, and deaths from overdoses, either accidental or deliberate, became a frequent occurrence. A common feature of the coroner's report in such cases would be the description of the deceased's body being found in a flat or bedsit littered with empty Chlorodyne bottles. Over the decades of the twentieth century, the cannabis was removed from the formulation, and the amount of opiates in the medicine were progressively reduced. The name of Collis Browne lives on in Britain in a mixture sold under the trade name "J Collis Browne's Mixture" for the relief of coughs and diarrhea. This modern formulation contains morphine and peppermint oil. The active ingredients per 5ml are: morphine hydrochloride equivalent to 1.0mg anhydrous morphine, peppermint oil 1.5 microlitres.

The other ingredients are: ethanol (alcohol), benzoic acid (E210), capsicum tincture, caramel (E150), menthol, citric acid (E330), hypromellose, sorbitol solution (E420), treacle (containing sucrose and fructose), purified water.

== See also ==
- Leonard Smithers
