= Yugoslavia at the Olympics =

- IOC code: YUG
- NOC: Yugoslav Olympic Committee
- Medals Ranked 42nd: Gold 26 Silver 32 Bronze 29 Total 87

Summer appearances
- 1920; 1924; 1928; 1932; 1936; 1948; 1952; 1956; 1960; 1964; 1968; 1972; 1976; 1980; 1984; 1988; 1992; 1996; 2000

Winter appearances
- 1924; 1928; 1932; 1936; 1948; 1952; 1956; 1960; 1964; 1968; 1972; 1976; 1980; 1984; 1988; 1992; 1994; 1998; 2002

Other related appearances
- Serbia (1912, 2008–pres.); Croatia (1992–pres.); Slovenia (1992–pres.); Bosnia and Herzegovina (1992 S–pres.); Independent Olympic Participants (1992 S); North Macedonia (1996–pres.); Serbia and Montenegro (1996–2006); Montenegro (2008–pres.); Kosovo (2016–pres.)

Teams from Yugoslavia first participated at the Olympic Games in 1920. Previously, several athletes from Croatia, Slovenia and northern Serbian province Vojvodina had competed for Austria or Hungary when those countries were part of the Empire of Austria-Hungary. A small team of two athletes had competed distinctly for Serbia at the 1912 Summer Olympics.

Yugoslavia has been the designation for Olympic teams from three distinct national entities:

- Kingdom of Yugoslavia (officially called the Kingdom of Serbs, Croats and Slovenes until 1929) from 1920 to 1936
- Socialist Federal Republic of Yugoslavia from 1948 to the 1992 Winter Olympics
- Federal Republic of Yugoslavia, formed as a joint state by only Montenegro and Serbia after the breakup of Yugoslavia, from 1992 to 2002 (due to UN ban allowed to compete as Independent Olympic Participants at the 1992 Summer Olympics and was not allowed to compete at 1994 Winter Olympics)

Two of the successor nations (Croatia and Slovenia) began to compete as independent teams at the Olympics starting at the 1992 Winter Games and Bosnia and Herzegovina at the 1992 Summer Games and as of the 2008 Summer Olympics, all six successor nations, former socialist republics, have participated independently. Kosovo, a former autonomous province, made its Olympic debut as an independent nation at the 2016 Summer Olympics.

== Timeline of participation ==
The Yugoslav Olympic Committee was established in Zagreb in 1919 (recognized by the IOC in 1920), before moving to Belgrade in 1927, and it took the place of the Serbian Olympic Committee in the Association of National Olympic Committees. During the dissolution of Yugoslavia, several new committees were formed in the break-away countries. The Federal Republic of Yugoslavia, consisting of the Republic of Serbia and the Republic of Montenegro, participated at the Games since 1996. At the 1996, 1998, , 2000 and 2002 Games, the nation was designated with the same code, Yugoslavia (YUG), as the defunct SFRY. It was rechartered as the State Union of Serbia and Montenegro in 2003 with there being no territorial changes. The Serbia and Montenegro (SCG) designation and code were used at the 2004 Summer and 2006 Winter Games.

Olympic Year/s	Teams						
1912	as part of Austria			Kingdom of Serbia			
1920–1936	Kingdom of Yugoslavia						
1948–1988	Yugoslavia						
1992 W	Slovenia	Croatia	Yugoslavia				
1992 S	Slovenia	Croatia	Bosnia and Herzegovina	Independent Olympic Participants			
1994	Slovenia	Croatia	Bosnia and Herzegovina	ban on participation by the UN			
1996	Slovenia	Croatia	Bosnia and Herzegovina	Macedonia	FR Yugoslavia/ Serbia and Montenegro		
1998–2006	Slovenia	Croatia	Bosnia and Herzegovina	Macedonia	FR Yugoslavia/ Serbia and Montenegro		
2008–2010	Slovenia	Croatia	Bosnia and Herzegovina	Macedonia	Serbia		Montenegro
2012–2014	Slovenia	Croatia	Bosnia and Herzegovina	Macedonia	Serbia		Montenegro
2016–2018	Slovenia	Croatia	Bosnia and Herzegovina	Macedonia	Serbia	Kosovo	Montenegro
2020–present	Slovenia	Croatia	Bosnia and Herzegovina	North Macedonia	Serbia	Kosovo	Montenegro

== Hosted Games ==
Yugoslavia has hosted the Games on one occasion.

Games	Host city	Dates	Nations	Participants	Events
1984 Winter Olympics	Sarajevo, SR Bosnia and Herzegovina	8 – 19 February	49	1,272	39

== Medal tables ==
Host country

- Yugoslavia hosted the 1984 Winter Olympics in Sarajevo, now part of Bosnia and Herzegovina.

=== Medals by Summer Games ===
Games	Athletes	Gold	Silver	Bronze	Total	Rank
(Belgium) 1920 Antwerp	15	0	0	0	0	–
(French Third Republic) 1924 Paris	42	2	0	0	2	14
(Netherlands) 1928 Amsterdam	34	1	1	3	5	21
(United States) 1932 Los Angeles	1	0	0	0	0	–
(Nazi Germany) 1936 Berlin	93	0	1	0	1	25
(United Kingdom) 1948 London	90	0	2	0	2	24
(Finland) 1952 Helsinki	87	1	2	0	3	21
(Australia) 1956 Melbourne	35	0	3	0	3	26
(Italy) 1960 Rome	116	1	1	0	2	18
(Japan) 1964 Tokyo	75	2	1	2	5	19
1968 Mexico City	69	3	3	2	8	16
(West Germany) 1972 Munich	126	2	1	2	5	20
(Canada) 1976 Montreal	88	2	3	3	8	16
(Soviet Union) 1980 Moscow	164	2	3	4	9	14
(United States) 1984 Los Angeles	139	7	4	7	18	9
(South Korea) 1988 Seoul	155	3	4	5	12	16
Total (16/30)	1,329	26	29	28	83	40

=== Medals by Winter Games ===
Games	Athletes	Gold	Silver	Bronze	Total	Rank
(France) 1924 Chamonix	4	0	0	0	0	–
(Switzerland) 1928 St. Moritz	6	0	0	0	0	–
(United States) 1932 Lake Placid	did not participate					
(Nazi Germany) 1936 Garmisch-Partenkirchen	17	0	0	0	0	–
(Switzerland) 1948 St. Moritz	17	0	0	0	0	–
(Norway) 1952 Oslo	6	0	0	0	0	–
(Italy) 1956 Cortina d'Ampezzo	17	0	0	0	0	–
(United States) 1960 Squaw Valley	did not participate					
(Austria) 1964 Innsbruck	31	0	0	0	0	–
(France) 1968 Grenoble	30	0	0	0	0	–
(Japan) 1972 Sapporo	26	0	0	0	0	–
(Austria) 1976 Innsbruck	28	0	0	0	0	–
(United States) 1980 Lake Placid	15	0	0	0	0	–
(Socialist Federal Republic of Yugoslavia) 1984 Sarajevo	72	0	1	0	1	14
(Canada) 1988 Calgary	22	0	2	1	3	14
(France) 1992 Albertville	25	0	0	0	0	–
Total (14/24)	316	0	3	1	4	44

=== Medals by summer sport ===
Sport	Gold	Silver	Bronze	Total
Gymnastics	5	2	4	11
Wrestling	4	6	6	16
Water polo	3	4	0	7
Boxing	3	2	6	11
Handball	3	1	1	5
Canoeing	2	2	1	5
Shooting	2	0	1	3
Basketball	1	4	2	7
Football	1	3	1	5
Rowing	1	1	3	5
Swimming	1	1	0	2
Athletics	0	2	0	2
Table tennis	0	1	1	2
Judo	0	0	2	2
Totals (14 entries)	26	29	28	83

As Independent Olympic Participants

Sport	Gold	Silver	Bronze	Total
Shooting	0	1	2	3
Totals (1 entries)	0	1	2	3

=== Medals by winter sport ===
Sport	Gold	Silver	Bronze	Total
Alpine skiing	0	2	0	2
Ski jumping	0	1	1	2
Totals (2 entries)	0	3	1	4

== List of medalists ==
=== Summer Olympics ===
Medal	Name(s)	Games	Sport	Event
Gold	Leon Štukelj	1924 Paris	Gymnastics	Men's all-around competition
Gold	Leon Štukelj	1924 Paris	Gymnastics	Men's horizontal bars
Gold	Leon Štukelj	1928 Amsterdam	Gymnastics	Men's rings
Silver	Josip Primožič	1928 Amsterdam	Gymnastics	Men's parallel bars
Bronze	Leon Štukelj	1928 Amsterdam	Gymnastics	Men's all-around competition
Bronze	Stane Derganc	1928 Amsterdam	Gymnastics	Men's vault
Bronze	Edvard Antosiewicz; Dragutin Cioti; Stane Derganc; Boris Gregorka; Anton Malej; Ivan Porenta; Josip Primožič; Leon Štukelj	1928 Amsterdam	Gymnastics	Men's team all-around
Silver	Leon Štukelj	1936 Berlin	Gymnastics	Men's rings
Silver	Ivan Gubijan	1948 London	Athletics	Men's hammer throw
Silver	Men's football team: Franjo Šoštarić Miroslav Brozović Branko Stanković Zlatko Čajkovski Aleksandar Atanacković Prvoslav Mihajlović Rajko Mitić Franjo Wölfl Stjepan Bobek Željko Čajkovski Ljubomir Lovrić Zvonimir Cimermančić Bernard Vukas Ivan Jazbinšek Ratko Kacian Frane Matošić Bela Palfi Miodrag Jovanović Kosta Tomašević Josip Takač Božo Broketa Aleksandar Petrović	1948 London	Football	Men's tournament
Gold	Duje Bonačić; Velimir Valenta; Mate Trojanović; Petar Šegvić	1952 Helsinki	Rowing	Men's coxless four
Silver	Men's football team: Vladimir Beara Branko Stanković Tomislav Crnković Zlatko Čajkovski Ivan Horvat Vujadin Boškov Tihomir Ognjanov Rajko Mitić Bernard Vukas Stjepan Bobek Branko Zebec Dušan Cvetković Milorad Diskić Ratko Čolić Slavko Luštica Zdravko Rajkov Vladimir Čonč Vladimir Firm	1952 Helsinki	Football	Men's tournament
Silver	Men's water polo team: Zdravko Kovačić Veljko Bakašun Ivo Štakula Boško Vuksanović Ivica Kurtini Lovro Radonjić Zdravko Ježić Juraj Amšel Vlado Ivković Marko Brainović Dragoslav D. Šiljak	1952 Helsinki	Water polo	Men's tournament
Silver	Franjo Mihalić	1956 Melbourne	Athletics	Men's marathon
Silver	Men's football team: Sava Antić Ibrahim Biogradlić Mladen Koščak Dobroslav Krstić Luka Lipošinović Muhamed Mujić Zlatko Papec Petar Radenković Nikola Radović Ivan Šantek Dragoslav Šekularac Ljubiša Spajić Todor Veselinović Blagoje Vidinić	1956 Melbourne	Football	Men's tournament
Silver	Men's water polo team: Ivo Cipci Tomislav Franjković Vlado Ivković Zdravko Ježić Hrvoje Kačić Zdravko Kovačić Lovro Radonjić Marijan Žužej	1956 Melbourne	Water polo	Men's tournament
Gold	Men's football team: Andrija Anković Vladimir Durković Milan Galić Fahrudin Jusufi Tomislav Knez Borivoje Kostić Aleksandar Kozlina Dusan Maravić Željko Matuš Željko Perušić Novak Roganović Velimir Sombolac Milutin Šoškić Silvester Takač Blagoje Vidinić Ante Žanetić	1960 Rome	Football	Men's tournament
Silver	Branislav Martinović	1960 Rome	Wrestling	Men's Greco-Roman lightweight
Gold	Miroslav Cerar	1964 Tokyo	Gymnastics	Men's pommeled horse
Gold	Branislav Simić	1964 Tokyo	Wrestling	Men's Greco-Roman middleweight
Silver	Men's water polo team: Ozren Bonačić Zoran Janković Milan Muškatirović Ante Nardeli Frane Nonković Vinko Rosić Mirko Sandić Zlatko Šimenc Božidar Stanišić Karlo Stipanić Ivo Trumbić	1964 Tokyo	Water polo	Men's tournament
Bronze	Miroslav Cerar	1964 Tokyo	Gymnastics	Men's horizontal bar
Bronze	Branislav Martinović	1964 Tokyo	Wrestling	Men's Greco-Roman featherweight
Gold	Miroslav Cerar	1968 Mexico City	Gymnastics	Men's pommeled horse
Gold	Đurđica Bjedov	1968 Mexico City	Swimming	Women's 100m breaststroke
Gold	Men's water polo team: Ozren Bonačić Dejan Dabović Zdravko Hebel Zoran Janković Ronald Lopatny Uroš Marović Đorđe Perišić Miroslav Poljak Mirko Sandić Karlo Stipanić Ivo Trumbić	1968 Mexico City	Water polo	Men's tournament
Silver	Đurđica Bjedov	1968 Mexico City	Swimming	Women's 200m breaststroke
Silver	Stevan Horvat	1968 Mexico City	Wrestling	Men's Greco-Roman lightweight
Silver	Men's basketball team: Dragutin Čermak Krešimir Ćosić Vladimir Cvetković Ivo Daneu Radivoj Korać Zoran Marojević Nikola Plećaš Trajko Rajković Dragoslav Ražnatović Petar Skansi Damir Šolman Aljoša Žorga	1968 Mexico City	Basketball	Men's tournament
Bronze	Zvonimir Vujin	1968 Mexico City	Boxing	Men's lightweight
Bronze	Branislav Simić	1968 Mexico City	Wrestling	Men's Greco-Roman Middleweight
Gold	Mate Parlov	1972 Munich	Boxing	Men's light-heavyweight
Gold	Men's handball team: Zoran Živković Abas Arslanagić Miroslav Pribanić Đorđe Lavrnić Slobodan Mišković Hrvoje Horvat Branislav Pokrajac Zdravko Miljak Milan Lazarević Nebojša Popović Zdenko Zorko Dobrivoje Selec Albin Vidović	1972 Munich	handball	Men's tournament
Silver	Josip Čorak	1972 Munich	Wrestling	Men's Greco-Roman light-heavyweight
Bronze	Zvonimir Vujin	1972 Munich	Boxing	Men's light-welterweight
Bronze	Milovan Nenadić	1972 Munich	Wrestling	Men's Greco-Roman middleweight
Gold	Matija Ljubek	1976 Montreal	Canoeing	Men's 1000m Canadian singles
Gold	Momir Petković	1976 Montreal	Wrestling	Men's Greco-Roman middleweight
Silver	Tadija Kačar	1976 Montreal	Boxing	Men's light middleweight
Silver	Ivan Frgić	1976 Montreal	Wrestling	Men's Greco-Roman bantamweight
Silver	Men's basketball team: Krešimir Ćosić Dražen Dalipagić Mirza Delibašić Blagoja Georgievski Vinko Jelovac Željko Jerkov Dragan Kićanović Andro Knego Zoran Slavnić Damir Šolman Žarko Varajić Rajko Žižić	1976 Montreal	Basketball	Men's tournament
Bronze	Matija Ljubek	1976 Montreal	Canoeing	Men's C1 500m Canadian singles
Bronze	Ace Rusevski	1976 Montreal	Boxing	Men's lightweight
Bronze	Slavko Obadov	1976 Montreal	Judo	Men's middleweight (80 kg)
Gold	Slobodan Kačar	1980 Moscow	Boxing	Men's light heavyweight
Gold	Men's basketball team: Andro Knego Branko Skroče Dragan Kićanović Dražen Dalipagić Duje Krstulović Krešimir Ćosić Mihovil Nakić Mirza Delibašić Rajko Žižić Ratko Radovanović Željko Jerkov Zoran Slavnić	1980 Moscow	Basketball	Men's tournament
Silver	Zoran Pančić; Milorad Stanulov	1980 Moscow	Rowing	Men's double sculls
Silver	Women's handball team: Radmila Drljača Katica Ileš Slavica Jeremić Vesna Milošević Vesna Radović Rada Savić Ana Titlić Zorica Vojinović Mirjana Ognjenović Biserka Višnjić Svetlana Anastasovski Svetlana Dašić-Kitić Mirjana Đurica Jasna Kolar-Merdan	1980 Moscow	Handball	Women's tournament
Silver	Men's water polo team: Zoran Roje Milorad Krivokapić Zoran Gopčević Boško Lozica Predrag Manojlović Zoran Mustur Milivoj Bebić Damir Polić Ratko Rudić Slobodan Trifunović Luka Vezilić	1980 Moscow	Water polo	Men's tournament
Bronze	Radomir Kovačević	1980 Moscow	Judo	Men's heavyweight
Bronze	Shaban Sejdiu	1980 Moscow	Wrestling	Men's freestyle lightweight
Bronze	Zlatko Celent; Duško Mrduljaš; Josip Reić	1980 Moscow	Rowing	Men's coxed pairs
Bronze	Women's basketball team: Mersada Bećirspahić Mira Bjedov Vesna Despotović Vera Đurašković Zorica Đurković Jelica Komnenović Biljana Majstorović Vukica Mitić Sanja Ožegović Sofija Pekić Jasmina Perazić Marija Tonković	1980 Moscow	Basketball	Women's tournament
Gold	Vlado Lisjak	1984 Los Angeles	Wrestling	Men's Greco-Roman 68 kg
Gold	Women's handball team: Svetlana Anastasovska Alenka Cuderman Svetlana Dašić Slavica Đukić Dragica Đurić Mirjana Đurica Emilija Erčić Ljubinka Janković Jasna Kolar-Merdan Ljiljana Mugoša Svetlana Mugoša Mirjana Ognjenović Zorica Pavićević Jasna Ptujec Biserka Višnjić	1984 Los Angeles	Handball	Women's tournament
Gold	Matija Ljubek; Mirko Nišović	1984 Los Angeles	Canoeing	Men's C-2 500 m
Gold	Shaban Tërstena	1984 Los Angeles	Wrestling	Men's freestyle 52 kg
Gold	Men's water polo team: Dragan Andrić Milivoj Bebić Perica Bukić Veselin Đuho Milorad Krivokapić Deni Lušić Igor Milanović Tomislav Paškvalin Zoran Petrović Andrija Popović Zoran Roje Goran Sukno Božo Vuletić	1984 Los Angeles	Water polo	Men's tournament
Gold	Anton Josipović	1984 Los Angeles	Boxing	Men's light heavyweight
Gold	Men's handball team: Zlatan Arnautović Mirko Bašić Jovica Elezović Mile Isaković Pavle Jurina Milan Kalina Slobodan Kuzmanovski Dragan Mladenović Zdravko Rađenović Momir Rnić Branko Štrbac Veselin Vujović Veselin Vuković Zdravko Zovko	1984 Los Angeles	Handball	Men's tournament
Silver	Refik Memišević	1984 Los Angeles	Wrestling	Men's Greco-Roman +100 kg
Silver	Milan Janić	1984 Los Angeles	Canoeing	Men's K-1 1000 m
Silver	Matija Ljubek; Mirko Nišović	1984 Los Angeles	Canoeing	Men's C-2 1000 m
Silver	Redžep Redžepovski	1984 Los Angeles	Boxing	Men's flyweight
Bronze	Jožef Tertei	1984 Los Angeles	Wrestling	Men's Greco-Roman 100 kg
Bronze	Zoran Pančić; Milorad Stanulov	1984 Los Angeles	Rowing	Men's double sculls
Bronze	Mirko Puzović	1984 Los Angeles	Boxing	Men's light welterweight
Bronze	Aziz Salihu	1984 Los Angeles	Boxing	Men's super heavyweight
Bronze	Shaban Sejdiu	1984 Los Angeles	Wrestling	Men's freestyle 74 kg
Bronze	Men's basketball team: Dražen Dalipagić Sabit Hadžić Andro Knego Emir Mutapčić Mihovil Nakić Aleksandar Petrović Dražen Petrović Ratko Radovanović Ivan Sunara Branko Vukićević Rajko Žižić Nebojša Zorkić	1984 Los Angeles	Basketball	Men's tournament
Bronze	Men's football team: Mirsad Baljić Mehmed Baždarević Vlado Čapljić Borislav Cvetković Stjepan Deverić Milko Đurovski Marko Elsner Nenad Gračan Tomislav Ivković Srečko Katanec Branko Miljuš Mitar Mrkela Jovica Nikolić Ivan Pudar Ljubomir Radanović Admir Smajić Dragan Stojković	1984 Los Angeles	Football	Men's tournament
Gold	Goran Maksimović	1988 Seoul	Shooting	Men's air rifle
Gold	Jasna Šekarić	1988 Seoul	Shooting	Women's air pistol
Gold	Men's water polo team: Dragan Andrić Mislav Bezmalinović Perica Bukić Veselin Đuho Igor Gočanin Deni Lušić Igor Milanović Tomislav Paškvalin Renco Posinković Goran Rađenović Dubravko Šimenc Aleksandar Šoštar Mirko Vičević	1988 Seoul	Water polo	Men's tournament
Silver	Shaban Tërstena	1988 Seoul	Wrestling	Men's freestyle flyweight (52 kg)
Silver	Ilija Lupulesku; Zoran Primorac	1988 Seoul	Table Tennis	Men's doubles
Silver	Women's basketball team: Anđelija Arbutina Vesna Bajkuša Polona Dornik Slađana Golić Kornelija Kvesić Mara Lakić Žana Lelas Bojana Milošević Razija Mujanović Danira Nakić Stojna Vangelovska Eleonora Wild	1988 Seoul	Basketball	Women's tournament
Silver	Men's basketball team: Franjo Arapović Zoran Čutura Danko Cvjetičanin Vlade Divac Toni Kukoč Željko Obradović Žarko Paspalj Dražen Petrović Dino Rađa Zdravko Radulović Stojko Vranković Jurij Zdovc	1988 Seoul	Basketball	Men's tournament
Bronze	Damir Škaro	1988 Seoul	Boxing	Men's light heavyweight
Bronze	Sadik Mujkić; Bojan Prešern	1988 Seoul	Rowing	Men's coxless pairs
Bronze	Jasna Šekarić	1988 Seoul	Shooting	Women's sport pistol
Bronze	Gordana Perkučin; Jasna Fazlić	1988 Seoul	Table Tennis	Women's doubles
Bronze	Men's handball team: Mirko Bašić Jožef Holpert Boris Jarak Slobodan Kuzmanovski Muhamed Memić Alvaro Načinović Goran Perkovac Zlatko Portner Iztok Puc Rolando Pušnik Momir Rnić Zlatko Saračević Irfan Smajlagić Ermin Velić Veselin Vujović	1988 Seoul	Handball	Men's tournament

As Federal Republic of Yugoslavia

Medal	Name(s)	Games	Sport	Event
Gold	Aleksandra Ivošev	1996 Atlanta	Shooting	Women's 50m rifle 3 positions
Silver	Men's basketball team: Miroslav Berić Dejan Bodiroga Predrag Danilović Vlade Divac Aleksandar Đorđević Nikola Lončar Saša Obradović Žarko Paspalj Željko Rebrača Zoran Savić Dejan Tomašević Milenko Topić	1996 Atlanta	Basketball	Men's tournament
Bronze	Aleksandra Ivošev	1996 Atlanta	Shooting	Women's 10m air rifle
Bronze	Men's volleyball team: Vladimir Batez Dejan Brđović Đorđe Đurić Andrija Gerić Nikola Grbić Vladimir Grbić Rajko Jokanović Slobodan Kovač Đula Mešter Žarko Petrović Željko Tanasković Goran Vujević	1996 Atlanta	Volleyball	Men's tournament
Gold	Men's volleyball team: Vladimir Batez Slobodan Boškan Andrija Gerić Nikola Grbić Vladimir Grbić Slobodan Kovač Đula Mešter Vasa Mijić Ivan Miljković Veljko Petković Goran Vujević Igor Vušurović	2000 Sydney	Volleyball	Men's tournament
Silver	Jasna Šekarić	2000 Sydney	Shooting	Women's 10m air pistol
Bronze	Men's water polo team: Aleksandar Ćirić Danilo Ikodinović Viktor Jelenić Nikola Kuljača Aleksandar Šapić Dejan Savić Aleksandar Šoštar Petar Trbojević Veljko Uskoković Jugoslav Vasović Vladimir Vujasinović Nenad Vukanić Predrag Zimonjić	2000 Sydney	Water polo	Men's tournament

As Independent Olympic Participants

Medal	Name	Games	Sport	Event
Silver	Jasna Šekarić	1992 Barcelona	Shooting	Women's 10m air pistol
Bronze	Aranka Binder	1992 Barcelona	Shooting	Women's 10m air rifle
Bronze	Stevan Pletikosić	1992 Barcelona	Shooting	Men's 50m rifle prone

=== Winter Olympics ===
Medal	Name	Games	Sport	Event
Silver	Jure Franko	1984 Sarajevo	Alpine skiing	Men's giant slalom
Silver	Mateja Svet	1988 Calgary	Alpine skiing	Women's slalom
Silver	Matjaž Debelak; Miran Tepeš; Primož Ulaga; Matjaž Zupan	1988 Calgary	Ski Jumping	Men's team large hill
Bronze	Matjaž Debelak	1988 Calgary	Ski Jumping	Men's individual large hill

== Following the breakup of Yugoslavia ==
Teams from Yugoslavia first participated at the Olympic Games in 1920. Yugoslavia has been the designation for Olympic teams from three distinct national entities:

- Kingdom of Yugoslavia (officially called the Kingdom of Serbs, Croats and Slovenes until 1929) from 1920 to 1936
- Socialist Federal Republic of Yugoslavia from 1948 to the 1992 Winter Olympics
- Federal Republic of Yugoslavia, formed as a joint state by only Montenegro and Serbia after the breakup of Yugoslavia, from 1996 to 2002

The United Nations affirmed that the Socialist Federal Republic of Yugoslavia had ceased to exist, and the Federal Republic of Yugoslavia (FRY) was a new state. All former republics were entitled to state succession, while none of them continued SFR Yugoslavia's international legal personality. As a result of the U.N. resolution, individual FRY athletes were allowed to compete as Independent Olympic Participants at the 1992 Summer Olympics, and FRY was not allowed to compete at the 1994 Winter Olympics.

The Federal Republic of Yugoslavia, consisting of the Republic of Serbia and the Republic of Montenegro, participated at the Games since 1996. At the 1996 Games, the nation was designated with the same code, Yugoslavia (YUG), as the defunct SFRY. It was rechartered as the State Union of Serbia and Montenegro in 2003 with there being no territorial changes. The Serbia and Montenegro (SCG) designation and code were used at the 2004 summer games and 2006 winter games.

Two of the successor nations (Croatia and Slovenia) began to compete as independent teams at the Olympics starting at the 1992 Winter Games and Bosnia and Herzegovina at the 1992 Summer Games and as of the 2008 Summer Olympics, all six successor nations, former socialist republics, have participated independently. Kosovo, a former autonomous province, made its Olympic debut as an independent national team at the 2016 Summer Olympics.

== See also ==
- Bosnia and Herzegovina at the Olympics
- Croatia at the Olympics
- Kosovo at the Olympics
- Montenegro at the Olympics
- North Macedonia at the Olympics
- Serbia at the Olympics
- Slovenia at the Olympics
- List of flag bearers for Yugoslavia at the Olympics
- Category:Olympic competitors for Yugoslavia
- Yugoslavia at the Paralympics
- List of Yugoslav Olympic medalists
