= Franjo Bučar State Award for Sport =

Franjo Bučar State Award for Sport Državna nagrada za sport Franjo Bučar
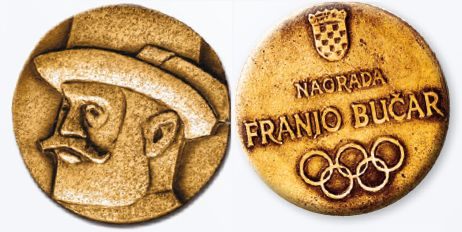
- Awarded for: Excellence in sports
- Country: Croatia
- Presented by: Ministry of Tourism and Sports
- First award: 1962
- Website: Državna nagrada za sport Franjo Bučar

Franjo Bučar State Award for Sport (Croatian: Državna nagrada za sport »Franjo Bučar«) is the highest recognition that Republic of Croatia gives for extraordinary achievements and contributions of remarkable meaning for the development of sport in Croatia. It is named after Croatian writer, sports activist and popularizer Franjo Bučar.

The award has been given since 1991. It came as successor of awards of the Socialist Republic of Croatia: Majska nagrada fizičke kulture and Republička nagrada fizičke kulture, which were awarded annually since 1962.

This award is given to professional and public workers in the area of sport, sportsmen, legal and physical entities the perform sports activity, as well as other entities whose work is meritorious for the development of sport.

== Winners ==
Year	Award for Life Achievement	Yearly Award
1991	Mirko Novosel	Danijela Bilbija; Perica Bukić; Tomislav Crnković; Jasminka Francki; Dragutin Magić; Josip Modrić; Danira Nakić; Goran Prpić; Josip Šporer; RK Lokomotiva Zagreb (women's handball club); Executive committee of 1990 European Championships in Athletics, Split; Kayak club Belišće, Belišće
1992	Franjo Frntić	Vladimir Findak; Mladen Horvat; Goran Ivanišević; Marko Pećina; Mihovil Rađa; Vilko Sever; Renato Vučetić; Branko Zorko; Croatian national basketball team (men) (Players: Dražen Petrović, Velimir Perasović, Danko Cvjetičanin, Toni Kukoč, Vladan Alanović, Franjo Arapović, Žan Tabak, Stojko Vranković, Alan Gregov, Arijan Komazec, Dino Rađa, Aramis Naglić, Head coach: Petar Skansi; Croatian national bowling team (women); RK Zagreb Lotto, Zagreb; Water polo club Jadran-Koteks, Split
1993	Miljenko Finderle	Boris Lalić; Krsto Mesić; Milivoj Obad; Renco Posinković; Zoran Primorac; Suzana Skoko; Milan Tumara; ATP Tour Tournament Croatia Open Umag
1994	Herman Vukušić	Dinko Beaković; Filip Ćurković; Mihovil Dorčić; Giuseppe Giergia; Dragan Milanović; Miloš Milošević; Anton Tucak; Coxless pairs VK Gusar, Split; Rowing club Gusar, Split
1995	Rudolf Carek; Nikola Turk	Nikola Grabić; Valter Ivančić; Iva Majoli; Željko Mavrović; Elida Ružić; Tomislav Šepec; Eduard Šrajer; Perica Vlašić; Croatian national canoe-slalom team; Basketball club Zadar; Sports Union of Međimurje County
1996	prof. dr. Milan Blašković; Marijan Malović	Željko Bosek; Anto Dragić; Krešimir Horvat; Ivan Janjić; Velimir Kljajić; Radovan Lipovšćak; Krešimir Pleša; Mirjana Ružnjak; Siniša Školneković; Croatian national handball team (Players: Vladimir Jelčić, Goran Perkovac, Irfan Smajlagić, Božidar Jović, Alvaro Načinović, Vladimir Šujster, Bruno Gudelj, Nenad Kljaić, Iztok Puc, Zoran Mikulić, Patrik Ćavar, Venio Losert, Valner Franković, Slavko Goluža, Valter Matošević, Zlatko Saračević, Head coach: Velimir Kljajić; Croatian national Water polo team (Players: Maro Balić, Perica Bukić, Damir Glavan, Igor Hinić, Vjekoslav Kobeščak, Joško Kreković, Ognjen Kržić, Dubravko Šimenc, Siniša Školneković, Ratko Štritof, Renato Vrbičić, Tino Vegar, Zdeslav Vrdoljak, Head coach Zoran Matutinović; RK Podravka, Koprivnica
1997	Filip Ćurković; Zdravko Kovačević	Davor Crnobori; Barbara Jelić; Anton Jurman; Tomislav Karlo; Vlatko Mamić; Vlatko Matijević; Eva Morandini - Plovanić; Robert Prosinečki; Rudolf Sabljak; Ana Sršen; Zdenko Uzorinac; Ivan Varvodić
1998	prof. dr Josip Marić; prof. dr Boris Volščanšek	Miroslav Blažević; Ante Čavar; Dražen Funtak; Vlaho Kojaković; Željko Mataja; Milka Milinković; prof. dr Zlatko Šimenc; Davor Šuker; Men's Quadruple Sculls HVK Gusar from Split; Croatia at the 1998 FIFA World Cup ( Dražen Ladić, Petar Krpan, Anthony Šerić, Igor Štimac, Goran Jurić, Slaven Bilić, Aljoša Asanović, Robert Prosinečki, Davor Šuker, Zvonimir Boban, Silvio Marić, Marijan Mrmić, Mario Stanić, Zvonimir Soldo, Igor Tudor, Ardian Kozniku, Robert Jarni, Zoran Mamić, Goran Vlaović, Dario Šimić, Krunoslav Jurčić, Vladimir Vasilj, coach Miroslav Blažević, coach Branko Ivanković, assistant coach Ivan Katalinić, director Vedran Rožić, secretary Zorislav Srebrić, medics dr Boris Nemec and dr Mladen Čepulić, physios Tomislav Vrbnjak and Bojan Radanović, economs Željko Mesić and Mladen Pilčić) * Croatian hiking club Petehovec from Delnice; Rowing club Jadran from Zadar.
1999	Vladimir Findak; Katica Ileš	Ante Bućo; Miroslav Delaš; Zvonimir Konjević; Neven Kovačević; Gordan Kožulj; Lovro Manestar; Boris Polić; Paskval Skelin; Vinko Tomljanović; Ninoslav Saraga and Oliver Martinov (Men's Coxless Pair of Croatian national rowing team); Croatia national Table Tennis team; Organising Committee 1999 Military World Games in Zagreb
2000	Miloš Marković; Matija Ljubek (posthumously)	Nikolaj Pešalov; Niko Pulić; Milivoj Bebić; Jasminka Čelik; Željko Klarić; Ivan Kos; Bojan Matković; Ante Tešija; Ivo Vidović; Marijan Vugrinčić; Men's eight of Croatian national rowing team (Igor Francetić, Tihomir Franković, Tomislav Smoljanović, Nikša Skelin, Siniša Skelin, Krešimir Čuljak, Igor Boraska, Branimir Vujević, and coxswain Silvije Petriško); Water polo club Jug from Dubrovnik
2001	prof. dr Zlatko Šimenc; mr sc. Slavko Podgorelec	Igor Čulin; Zdenko Jajčević; dr Dabiša Ježina; Branko Kenfelja-Vincek; Andro Knego; dr Tugomir Krmpotić; Ante Ledić; Zina Urlić; Tamara Boroš; Janica Kostelić; Croatian national handball team (deaf); Table Tennis club Večernji list from Zagreb
2002	prof. dr Žarko Dolinar; Krešimir Ćosić (posthumously); Dražen Petrović (posthumously)	Zvonimir Boban; Nikola Bralić; Siniša Ergotić; Ivica Kostelić; prof. dr Branimir Kuleš; Vedran Pavlek; Veljko Rogošić; Dubravko Šimenc; Lidija Vekić; Milan Zekanović; Croatian Bocce Federation; Sports club of High School Petar Preradović from Virovitica
2003	Milan Antolković; Vicko Lučić	prof. dr sc. Mate Bartoluci; Blaženka Birolla; Lino Červar; Antun Fijala; Ante Kostelić; Nikola Kristić; Marija Iveković; Branka Pereglin; Dino Rađa; Mihovil Rajević; Petar Skansi; Nataša Vezmar
2004	prof. dr sc. Miro Mihovilović; Antun Vrdoljak	Ivano Balić; Antun Čilić; Duje Draganja; Đurđa Fočić–Šourek; Karlo Kuret; Ivan Ljubičić and Mario Ančić; Emil Pravdić; Nikša Skelin and Siniša Skelin; Mihovil Španja; Croatia men's national handball team 2004 (Players: Ivano Balić, Davor Dominiković, Mirza Džomba, Slavko Goluža, Nikša Kaleb, Blaženko Lacković, Venio Losert, Valter Matošević, Petar Metličić, Vlado Šola, Denis Špoljarić, Goran Šprem, Igor Vori, Vedran Zrnić, Drago Vuković; coach Lino Červar; assistant coach Irfan Smajlagić; technical director Ivica Udovičić; physio Stanislav Peharec; physio Milorad Sakradžija); Croatian Handball Federation; Water polo club Šibenik
2005	Irislav Dolenec; Vicko Šoljan	Joško Berket; Ivan Fattorini; Radica Jurkin; Stjepan Korbar; Zlatko Kranjčar; Ivan Lovreković; Zvonimir Miloš Božikov; Jelica Pavličić–Štefančić; Dado Pršo; Robert Seligman; Mile Smodlaka; Table Tennis club Donat from Zadar
2006	Nikola Jurković; Stjepan Korbar; Veljko Rogošić	Athletic club for disabled persons Agram from Zagreb; Dinko Bravar; Josip Čop; Elvis Fatović; Danijela Grgić; Emil Hofman; Miroslav Kotarac; Marin Mišura; Goran Sukno; Žarko Susić; Sailing club Uskok from Zadar; Blanka Vlašić
2007	Miroslav Blažević; Ante Pavlović; Žarko Susić	Slaven Bilić; Ivana Brkljačić; Ivo Cipci; Nataša Drenčić Jerković; Marijan Klanac; Tomislav Paškvalin; Ratko Rudić; Damir Škaro; Andrija Vekić; Zdeslav Vrdoljak; Dinko Vuleta; Croatian Water Polo Federation
2008	Ivo Cipci; Željko Mataja; Josip Modrić	Branimir Budetić; Igor Koprivnikar; Darko Kralj; Boško Lozica; Matej Mamić; Vlatko Marković; Snježana Pejčić; Mirna Rajle-Brođanac; Sandra Šarić; Filip Ude; Martina Zubčić; Croatian Association of Health Staff in Basketball
2009	Zdravko Baršnik; Ivan Janjić; Renato Vučetić	Vinko Bajrović; Vladimir Canjuga; Slavko Goluža; Erna Hawelka Rađenović; Duško Klisović; Fredi Kramer; Dražen Mađarević; Ruža Markešić; Nikola Perković; Zorislav Srebrić; Marko Strahija; Sport diving club Zadar
2010	Josip Čorak; Darko Dujmović; Velimir Kljaić (posthumously)	Samir Barač; Mateo Beusan; Josip Ćuk; prim. dr. Božidar Fučkar; Igor Hinić; Ivan Ivančić; Marinko Mikulandra; Sandra Perković; Željko Štefanac; Goran Vrbanac; Vladimir Vujnović; Swimming club Korčula
2011	prim. dr. Ivan Fattorini; prof. dr. sc. Dragan Milanović; Vinko Tomljanović	Ozren Bonačić; Aldo Buršić; Ivo Dragić; Ivan Kljaković-Gašpić; prof. dr. sc. Igor Jukić; Lovre Kalašić; Ivan Laljak; Tina Mihelić; Duško Mrduljaš; Ana Zaninović; Lucija Zaninović; Union of Sport Associations of the City of Osijek
2012	Ivan Ivančić; Željko Pavličević; Zorislav Srebrić	Giovanni Cernogoraz; Marinko Mikalundra; Damir Burić; Ratko Rudić; Vladimir Papić; Josip Pavić; Mikela Ristoski; Krunoslav Sabolić; Tonči Stipanović; Zoran Talić; Toni Tomas; Stjepan Vučković; Zdenko Zorko; Quadruple Sculls Team (Valent Sinković, Martin Sinković, Damir Martin, and David Šain)
2013	Jozo Alebić; Erna Hawelka Rađenović; Fredi Kramer	Đurđica Bjedov Gabrilo; Nikša Dobud; Ivan Drviš; Josip Glasnović; Janko Goleš; Davorin Klobučar; Arno Longin; Zdravko Malić; Roko Mikelin Opara; Marijo Možnik; Sandro Sukno; Croatian Rowing Federation
2014	Vinko Bajrović; Anto Ćavar; Giuseppe Giergia	Milka Babović; Mirko Barišić; Šime Fantela; Edo Fantela; Zdenko Kobeščak; Zlatko Lukić; Igor Marenić; Sandra Paović; Martin Sinković; Valent Sinković; Ana Šimić; Croatian Kinesiology Association
2015	dr. sc. Gojko Arneri (posthumously); Đurđica Bjedov Gabrilo; Janko Goleš	Filip Hrgović; Leonard Pijetraj; Jurica Gizdić; izv. prof. dr. sc. Vladimir Braco Janković; Kristijan Vincetić; Frano Vićan; Jurica Carić; Ivo Karlović; Maša Martinović; Damir Erceg; Damir Martin; Ronald Lopatny; Gymnastics Society Osijek - Žito
2016	dr. Ivo Vidović (posthumously); Jelica Pavličić-Štefančić; Luciano Sušanj	Zoran Veselinović; Maro Joković; Andro Bušlje; Bono Bošnjak; Marija Anzulović; Veselin Đuho; Sanja Jovanović; Goran Čolak; Velimir Šandor; Mirela Šikoronja Ivančin; Danial Temim; Croatian Women's Table Tennis Team (Anđela Mužinić and Helena Dretar Karić)
2017	Zdenko Zorko; Zdravko Hebel (posthumously); Zina Urlić	Deni Lušić; Dina Levačić; Edi Stipić; Edo Pezzi; Igor Boraska; Ivica Tucak; Jozo Jakelić; Luka Lončar; Ratko Kovačić; Tihomir Franković; Valentina Pereglin; Vlado Lisjak
2018	izv. prof. dr. sc. Vladimir Braco Janković; Milka Babović; Mate Parlov (posthumously)	Zlatko Dalić; Luka Modrić; Josip Bilić; Tin Srbić; Ivo Trumbić; Miho Bošković; Dino Sinovčić; Neven Bertičević; Boško Božić; Vjekoslav Šafranić; Petra Deša; Croatian National Football Team (Players: Danijel Subašić, Lovre Kalinić, Dominik Livaković, Vedran Ćorluka, Domagoj Vida, Ivan Strinić, Dejan Lovren, Šime Vrsaljko, Josip Pivarić, Tin Jedvaj, Duje Ćaleta-Car, Luka Modrić, Ivan Rakitić, Mateo Kovačić, Marcelo Brozović, Milan Badelj, Filip Bradarić, Mario Mandžukić, Ivan Perišić, Nikola Kalinić, Andrej Kramarić, Ante Rebić, Marko Pjaca, Head coach: Zlatko Dalić)
2019	Zdenko Kobešćak; Duško Antunović; Zdravko Malić	Darko Berljak; Vlaho-Mišo Asić; Miran Martinac; Laura Štefanac; Tomislav Krističević; Zoran Roje; Klaudija Bubalo; Filip Grgić; Enrico Marotti; Nikola Plećaš; Croatian Davis Cup Team (men) (Players: Marin Čilić, Borna Ćorić, Franko Škugor, Mate Pavić, Ivan Dodig, Nikola Mektić, Captain: Željko Krajan)
2020	Ivo Trumbić; Petar Skansi; Ante Kostelić	Pero Kuterovac; Bruno Bošnjak; Mimi Vurdelja; Slaven Zambata; Stojko Vrnaković; Slavko Cvitković; Paulo Obradović; Neven Šavora; Željan Konsuo; Rea Hraski; Matija Gubica; Boris Milošević (rukometni sudac)
2021	Željko Klarić; Mihovil Nakić-Vojnović; Đurđa Fočić Šourek	Matea Jelić; prof. dr. sc. Boris Labar; Damir Šolman; Željko Jerkov; prof. dr. sc. Slavko Trninić; Nikola Mektić; Mate Pavić; Anđela Mužinić; Helena Dretar Karić; Nenad Šoštarić; prof. dr. sc. Damir Knjaz; Croatian Taekwondo Federation
2022	Nikola Plećaš; Boško Lozica; Edo Pezzi	Branka Batinić; Marko Bljač; Nataša Muždalo; Žana Lelas (posthumously); Nikola Pilić; prof. dr. sc. Vatromir Srhoj; Ivan Krapić; Ivo Mikulučin; Želimir Feitl; Lucijan Krce; Radiša Mladenović; Rowing Club "Iktus" Osijek
2023	prof. dr. sc. Slavko Trinić; Nikola Pilić; Damir Šolman (posthumously)	Josip Šojat; Ivica Jelić; Josip Reić; Kornelija Kvesić; Tigran Gorički; Zlatko Žagmešter; Ivan Katanušić; Josip Vrlić; Mladen Drnasin; Damir Polić; Ilija Matijević; Rowing Club "Krka" Šibenik
2024	Zorislav Srebrić; Željko Pavličević; Morana Paliković Gruden	Donna Vekić; Barbara Matić; Miran Maričić; Edis Elkasević; Lena Stojković; Veljko Laura; Loren Fatović; Vladimir Preradović; Deni Černi; Ivan Mikulić; Luka Bukić; Croatian Gymnastics Federation
2025	Milivoj Bebić; Andro Knego; Martin Novoselac	Toni Kanaet; Petar Muslim; Dragan Crnov; Gabrijel Veočić; Mario Vukoja; Vjekoslav Kobešćak; Karlo Kodrić; Filip Mihaljević; Luka Baković; Marko Mastelić; Biserka Vrbek; Taekwondo Club "Marjan"
2026	Branka Batinić; Veselin Duho; Ivan Gudelj (posthumously)	Vladimir Mađarević; Ivan Huklek; Sara Kolak; Slobodan Glavčić; Ante Vukičević; Filip Jurišić; Boris Kljaić; Vedran Dumenčić; Predrag Sloboda; Dubravko Ižaković; Zvonimir Bilić; Karate klub "Alfa"
