= Yugoslavia at the 1968 Summer Olympics =

- Flag of SFR Yugoslavia
- IOC code: YUG
- NOC: Yugoslav Olympic Committee

in Mexico City
- Competitors: 69 (59 men, 10 women) in 11 sports
- Flag bearer: Branislav Simić
- Medals Ranked 16th: Gold 3 Silver 3 Bronze 2 Total 8

Summer Olympics appearances (overview)
- 1920; 1924; 1928; 1932; 1936; 1948; 1952; 1956; 1960; 1964; 1968; 1972; 1976; 1980; 1984; 1988; 1992; 1996; 2000

Other related appearances
- Serbia (1912, 2008–pres.); Croatia (1992–pres.); Slovenia (1992–pres.); Bosnia and Herzegovina (1992 S–pres.); Independent Olympic Participants (1992 S); North Macedonia (1996–pres.); Serbia and Montenegro (1996–2006); Montenegro (2008–pres.); Kosovo (2016–pres.)

Athletes from the Socialist Federal Republic of Yugoslavia competed at the 1968 Summer Olympics in Mexico City, Mexico. 69 competitors, 59 men and 10 women, took part in 54 events in 11 sports.

== Medalists ==
Medal	Name	Sport	Event
Gold	Miroslav Cerar	Gymnatics	Men's Pommel Horse
Gold	Đurđica Bjedov	Swimming	Women's 100m Breaststroke
Gold	Ozren Bonačić; Dejan Dabović; Zdravko Hebel; Zoran Janković; Ronald Lopatny; Uroš Marović; Đorđe Perišić; Miroslav Poljak; Mirko Sandić; Karlo Stipanić; Ivo Trumbić	Water Polo	Men's Team Competition
Silver	Đurđica Bjedov	Swimming	Women's 200m Breaststroke
Silver	Stevan Horvat	Wrestling	Men's Greco-Roman Lightweight
Silver	Dragutin Čermak; Krešimir Ćosić; Vladimir Cvetković; Ivo Daneu; Radivoj Korać; Zoran Marojević; Nikola Plećaš; Trajko Rajković; Dragoslav Ražnatović; Petar Skansi; Damir Šolman; Aljoša Žorga	Basketball	Men's Team Competition
Bronze	Zvonimir Vujin	Boxing	Men's Lightweight
Bronze	Branislav Simić	Wrestling	Men's Greco-Roman Middleweight

== Cycling ==
Four male cyclists represented Yugoslavia in 1968.

Individual road race

- Cvitko Bilić
- Rudi Valenčič
- Tanasije Kuvalja

Team time trial

- Cvitko Bilić
- Rudi Valenčič
- Tanasije Kuvalja
- Franc Škerlj

== Shooting ==
Four shooters, all men, represented Yugoslavia in 1968.

50 m rifle, three positions

- Slobodan Paunović
- Vladimir Grozdanović

50 m rifle, prone

- Branislav Lončar
- Dušan Epifanić

== Swimming ==
Men

Athlete	Event	Heat		Semifinal		Final	
Athlete	Event	Time	Rank	Time	Rank	Time	Rank
Danijel Vrhovšek	100 m backstroke	1:02.9	10 Q	1:02.7	=13	Did not advance	
Slavko Kurbanović	100 m breaststroke	1:11.6	25	Did not advance			
Slavko Kurbanović	200 m breaststroke	2:39.9	21	Did not advance			

Women

Athlete	Event	Heat		Semifinal		Final	
Athlete	Event	Time	Rank	Time	Rank	Time	Rank
Ana Boban	100 m freestyle	1:05.4	=37	Did not advance			
Mirjana Šegrt	100 m freestyle	1:03.3	=14 Q	1:01.9	7 Q	1:01.5	7
Mirjana Šegrt	200 m freestyle	2:15.7	=5 Q	—N/a		2:13.3	5
Zdenka Gašparac	100 m backstroke	1:09.9	4 Q	1:10.8	=12	Did not advance	
Zdenka Gašparac	200 m backstroke	2:33.7	6 Q	—N/a		2:33.5	6
Đurđica Bjedov	100 m breaststroke	1:17.7 OR	2 Q	1:17.1	5 Q	1:15.8 OR	1st place, gold medalist(s)
Đurđica Bjedov	200 m breaststroke	2:50.2	7 Q	—N/a		2:46.4	2nd place, silver medalist(s)
Zdenka Gašparac; Đurđica Bjedov; Mirjana Šegrt; Ana Boban	4 × 100 m medley relay	DSQ		—N/a		Did not advance	

== Water polo ==
=== Men's team competition ===
- Preliminary Round (Group B)

- Defeated United Arab Republic (13:2)
- Tied with East Germany (4:4)
- Defeated Mexico (9:0)
- Defeated Netherlands (7:4)
- Lost to Italy (4:5)
- Defeated Greece (11:1)
- Defeated Japan (17:2)

- Semifinals

- Defeated Hungary (8:6)

- Final

- Defeated Soviet Union (13:11) → Gold Medal

- Team Roster

- Ozren Bonačić
- Dejan Dabović
- Zdravko Hebel
- Zoran Janković
- Ronald Lopatny
- Uroš Marović
- Đorđe Perišić
- Miroslav Poljak
- Mirko Sandić
- Karlo Stipanić
- Ivo Trumbić
