= Yugoslavia at the 1972 Summer Olympics =

- Flag of SFR Yugoslavia
- IOC code: YUG
- NOC: Yugoslav Olympic Committee

in Munich
- Competitors: 126 (113 men, 13 women) in 15 sports
- Flag bearer: Mirko Sandić
- Medals Ranked 20th: Gold 2 Silver 1 Bronze 2 Total 5

Summer Olympics appearances (overview)
- 1920; 1924; 1928; 1932; 1936; 1948; 1952; 1956; 1960; 1964; 1968; 1972; 1976; 1980; 1984; 1988; 1992; 1996; 2000

Other related appearances
- Serbia (1912, 2008–pres.); Croatia (1992–pres.); Slovenia (1992–pres.); Bosnia and Herzegovina (1992 S–pres.); Independent Olympic Participants (1992 S); North Macedonia (1996–pres.); Serbia and Montenegro (1996–2006); Montenegro (2008–pres.); Kosovo (2016–pres.)

Athletes from the Socialist Federal Republic of Yugoslavia competed at the 1972 Summer Olympics in Munich, West Germany. 126 competitors, 113 men and 13 women, took part in 73 events in 15 sports.

== Medalists ==
Medal	Name	Sport	Event
Gold	Mate Parlov	Boxing	Men's Light-Heavyweight
Gold	Zoran Živković; Abas Arslanagić; Miroslav Pribanić; Đorđe Lavrnić; Slobodan Mišković; Hrvoje Horvat; Branislav Pokrajac; Zdravko Miljak; Milan Lazarević; Nebojša Popović; Zdenko Zorko; Dobrivoje Selec; Albin Vidović	Handball	Men's Team Competition
Silver	Josip Čorak	Wrestling	Men's Greco-Roman Light-Heavyweight
Bronze	Zvonimir Vujin	Boxing	Men's Light-Welterweight
Bronze	Milovan Nenadić	Wrestling	Men's Greco-Roman Middleweight

== Athletics ==
Men's 800 metres

- Jože Medjumurec

- Heat – 1:48.1
- Semifinals – 1:49.0 (→ did not advance)

Men's 1500 metres

- Jože Medjumurec

- Heat – 3:52.1 (→ did not advance)

Men's 5000 metres

- Daniel Korica

- Heat – DNS (→ did not advance)

== Basketball ==
=== Men's team competition ===
- Preliminary Round

- Defeated Italy (85-78)
- Defeated Poland (85-64)
- Lost to Puerto Rico (74-79)
- Defeated Philippines (117-76)
- Defeated West Germany (81-56)
- Defeated Senegal (73-57)
- Lost to Soviet Union (67-74)

- Classification Matches

- 5th/8th place: Defeated Czechoslovakia (66-63)
- 5th/6th place: Defeated Puerto Rico (86-70) → Fifth place

Team roster

Yugoslavia men's national basketball team roster
Players
Coaches

Pos.	No.	Name	Age – Date of birth	Height	Club
SG	4	Ratomir Tvrdić	28 – 14 September 1943	1.85 m (6 ft 1 in)	Jugoplastika	(Socialist Federal Republic of Yugoslavia)
SG	5	Ljubodrag Simonović	23 – 1 January 1949	1.96 m (6 ft 5 in)	Crvena zvezda	(Socialist Federal Republic of Yugoslavia)
	6	Vinko Jelovac	23 – 18 September 1948	2.08 m (6 ft 10 in)	AŠK Olimpija	(Socialist Federal Republic of Yugoslavia)
C	7	Žarko Knežević	25 – 17 July 1947	2.10 m (6 ft 11 in)	Partizan	(Socialist Federal Republic of Yugoslavia)
	8	Miroljub Damnjanović	21 – 25 November 1950	2.02 m (6 ft 8 in)	Radnički Belgrade	(Socialist Federal Republic of Yugoslavia)
	9	Dragan Kapičić	24 – 7 August 1948	1.98 m (6 ft 6 in)	Crvena zvezda	(Socialist Federal Republic of Yugoslavia)
PG	10	Blagoja Georgievski	21 – 15 October 1950	1.83 m (6 ft 0 in)	Rabotnički	(Socialist Federal Republic of Yugoslavia)
C	11	Krešimir Ćosić	23 – 26 November 1948	2.11 m (6 ft 11 in)	BYU	(United States)
SF	12	Damir Šolman	22 – 7 September 1949	2.00 m (6 ft 7 in)	Jugoplastika	(Socialist Federal Republic of Yugoslavia)
PG	13	Nikola Plećaš	24 – 10 January 1948	1.87 m (6 ft 2 in)	Lokomotiva Zagreb	(Socialist Federal Republic of Yugoslavia)
SG	14	Dragutin Čermak	27 – 12 October 1944	1.97 m (6 ft 6 in)	Partizan	(Socialist Federal Republic of Yugoslavia)
	15	Milun Marović	24 – 15 September 1947	2.06 m (6 ft 9 in)	Radnički Belgrade	(Socialist Federal Republic of Yugoslavia)

Head coach

- (Socialist Federal Republic of Yugoslavia) Ranko Žeravica

Legend

- Club – describes last
  club before the tournament
- Age – describes age
  on 27 August 1972

== Boxing ==
Men's Light Middleweight (– 71 kg)

- Svetomir Belić

- First Round – Defeated Dumar Fall (SEN), 4:1
- Second Round – Lost to Anthony Richardson (HOL), 2:3

== Cycling ==
Five cyclists represented Yugoslavia in 1972.

Individual road race

- Radoš Čubrić – 43rd place
- Jože Valenčič – 51st place
- Eugen Pleško – did not finish (→ no ranking)
- Janez Zakotnik – did not finish (→ no ranking)

Team time trial

- Cvitko Bilić
- Radoš Čubrić
- Jože Valenčič
- Janez Zakotnik

== Handball ==
Yugoslavia won the second Olympic handball tournament. In the first round, they defeated all three opponents (Japan, the United States, and Hungary to take first place in the group and join seven other teams in advancing to the second round. There, they defeated both of the other teams they played (West Germany and Romania). First place in the division earned Yugoslavia the chance to appear in the gold medal game, where they defeated Czechoslovakia.

Men's Team Competition:

- Yugoslavia - Gold medal (6–0)

== Sailing ==
Finn

- Fabris Minski – 146.0 (→ 21st place)

Flying Dutchman

- Anton Grego and Simo Nikolic – 63.7 (→ 5th place)

Alternate member:: Zoricic, Filip

== Shooting ==
Two male shooters represented Yugoslavia in 1972.

Open

Athlete	Event	Final	
Athlete	Event	Score	Rank
Petar Bajić	50 m pistol	541	33
Zdravko Milutinović	50 m rifle, prone	593	30
Zdravko Milutinović	50 metre rifle three positions	1144	10

== Swimming ==
Men's 100m Freestyle

- Sandro Rudan

- Heat – 56.91s (→ did not advance)

Men's 200m Freestyle

- Sandro Rudan

- Heat – 2:05.88 (→ did not advance)

== Water polo ==
=== Men's team competition ===
==== Pool A ====
Nation	Pld	W	D	L	GF	GA
United States	5	5	0	0	31	18
Yugoslavia	5	4	0	1	35	24
Cuba	5	3	0	2	28	23
Romania	5	2	0	3	38	26
Mexico	5	1	0	4	25	30
Canada	5	0	0	5	14	50

	August 27		1st	2nd	3rd	4th
Yugoslavia	12-4	Canada	3-1	4-1	3-1	2-1

	August 28		1st	2nd	3rd	4th
Romania	7-8	Yugoslavia	3-2	2-1	2-2	0-3

	August 29		1st	2nd	3rd	4th
Mexico	3-5	Yugoslavia	0-1	1-1	1-3	1-0

	August 30		1st	2nd	3rd	4th
Yugoslavia	7-5	Cuba	0-2	3-1	2-1	2-1

	August 31		1st	2nd	3rd	4th
Yugoslavia	3-5	United States	0-1	1-1	1-2	1-1

==== Group I (Classification Gold – 6th) ====
Pos.	Nation	Pld	W	D	L	GF	GA
1	Soviet Union	5	3	2	0	22	16
2	Hungary	5	3	2	0	23	18
3	United States	5	2	1	2	24	23
4	West Germany	5	0	3	2	13	18
5	Yugoslavia	5	1	2	2	20	24
6	Italy	5	0	2	3	21	26

	August 31		1st	2nd	3rd	4th
Yugoslavia	3-5	United States	0-1	1-1	1-2	1-1

	September 1		1st	2nd	3rd	4th
Yugoslavia	4-5	Soviet Union	1-2	0-2	2-0	1-1

	September 2		1st	2nd	3rd	4th
Yugoslavia	6-6	Italy	2-2	2-1	1-1	1-2

	September 3		1st	2nd	3rd	4th
Yugoslavia	2-4	Hungary	0-1	1-1	0-1	1-1

	September 4		1st	2nd	3rd	4th
Yugoslavia	5-4	West Germany	3-0	0-1	1-1	1-2

==== Team roster ====
- Dušan Antunović
- Siniša Belamarić
- Ozren Bonačić
- Zoran Janković
- Ronald Lopatny
- Miloš Marković
- Uroš Marović
- Đorđe Perišić
- Ratko Rudić
- Mirko Sandić
- Karlo Stipanić
