= Yugoslavia men's Olympic water polo team records and statistics =

This article lists various water polo records and statistics in relation to the Yugoslavia men's national water polo team at the Summer Olympics.

The Yugoslavia men's national water polo team has participated in 12 of 27 official men's water polo tournaments.

== Abbreviations ==
Apps	Appearances	Rk	Rank	Ref	Reference	Cap No.	Water polo cap number
Pos	Playing position	FP	Field player	GK	Goalkeeper	ISHOF	International Swimming Hall of Fame
L/R	Handedness	L	Left-handed	R	Right-handed	Oly debut	Olympic debut in water polo
(C)	Captain	p.	page	pp.	pages		

== Team statistics ==
=== Comprehensive results by tournament ===
Notes:

- Results of Olympic qualification tournaments are not included. Numbers refer to the final placing of each team at the respective Games.
- At the 1904 Summer Olympics, a water polo tournament was contested, but only American contestants participated. Currently the International Olympic Committee (IOC) and the International Swimming Federation (FINA) consider water polo event as part of unofficial program in 1904.
- Related teams: Croatia men's Olympic water polo team (statistics), FR Yugoslavia men's Olympic water polo team^{†} (Note: After the breakup of Yugoslavia, FR Yugoslavia men's national water polo team participated at the 1996 and 2000 Olympics, and won a bronze medal in 2000. In 2003, after the country was renamed from FR Yugoslavia to Serbia and Montenegro, the team was also renamed to "Serbia and Montenegro men's national water polo team".) (statistics), Serbia and Montenegro men's Olympic water polo team^{†} (statistics), Montenegro men's Olympic water polo team (statistics), Serbia men's Olympic water polo team (statistics).
- Last updated: 5 May 2021.

Legend

- 1 – Champions
- 2 – Runners-up
- 3 – Third place
- 4 – Fourth place
- — – The nation did not participate in the Games
- Q – Qualified for forthcoming tournament
- Team^{†} – Defunct team

Abbreviation

- FRY – FR Yugoslavia
- SCG – Serbia and Montenegro

Men's team	00	04	08	12	20	24	28	32	36	48	52	56	60	64	68	72	76	80	84	88	92	96	00	04	08	12	16	20	Years
Yugoslavia^{†}	—	—	—	—					10	9	2	2	4	2	1	5	5	2	1	1	Defunct								12
Croatia	—	—	—	—	Part of Yugoslavia																	2	7	10	6	1	2	5	7
Yugoslavia / Serbia and Montenegro^{†}	—	—	—	—	Part of Yugoslavia																—	8	3	2	Defunct				3
Montenegro	—	—	—	—	Part of Yugoslavia																P. of FRY / SCG				4	4	4	8	4
Serbia	—	—	—		Part of Yugoslavia																P. of FRY / SCG				3	3	1	1	4
Total teams	7		4	6	12	13	14	5	16	18	21	10	16	13	15	16	12	12	12	12	12	12	12	12	12	12	12	12	

=== Number of appearances ===
Last updated: 5 May 2021.

Legend

- Team^{†} – Defunct team

Men's team	Apps	Record streak	Active streak	Debut	Most recent	Best finish	Confederation
Yugoslavia^{†}	12	12	0	1936	1988	Champions	Europe – LEN

=== Best finishes ===
Last updated: 5 May 2021.

Legend

- Team^{†} – Defunct team

Men's team	Best finish	Apps	Confederation
Yugoslavia^{†}	Champions (1968, 1984, 1988)	12	Europe – LEN

=== Finishes in the top four ===
Last updated: 5 May 2021.

Legend

- Team^{†} – Defunct team

Men's team	Total	Champions	Runners-up	Third place	Fourth place	First	Last
Yugoslavia^{†}	8	3 (1968, 1984, 1988)	4 (1952, 1956, 1964, 1980)		1 (1960)	1952	1988

=== Medal table ===
Last updated: 5 May 2021.

Legend

- Team^{†} – Defunct team

Men's team	Gold	Silver	Bronze	Total
Yugoslavia (YUG)^{†}	3	4	0	7

== Player statistics ==
=== Multiple appearances ===
The following table is pre-sorted by number of Olympic appearances (in descending order), year of the last Olympic appearance (in ascending order), year of the first Olympic appearance (in ascending order), date of birth (in ascending order), name of the player (in ascending order), respectively.

- Number of five-time Olympians: 0
- Number of four-time Olympians: 2
- Last updated: 27 July 2021.

Male athletes who competed in water polo at four or more Olympics
Apps	Player	Birth	Pos	Water polo tournaments					Age of first/last	ISHOF member	Note	Ref
Apps	Player	Birth	Pos	1	2	3	4	5	Age of first/last	ISHOF member	Note	Ref
4	Mirko Sandić	1942	FP	1960	1964	1968	1972		18/30	1999	Flag bearer for Yugoslavia (1972)	
4	Ozren Bonačić	1942	FP	1964	1968	1972	1976		22/34			

Note:

- Dubravko Šimenc is listed in Croatia men's Olympic water polo team records and statistics.

=== Multiple medalists ===
The following table is pre-sorted by total number of Olympic medals (in descending order), number of Olympic gold medals (in descending order), number of Olympic silver medals (in descending order), year of receiving the last Olympic medal (in ascending order), year of receiving the first Olympic medal (in ascending order), name of the player (in ascending order), respectively.

- Number of four-time Olympic medalists: 0
- Number of three-time Olympic medalists: 0
- Last updated: 1 May 2021.

Note:

- Perica Bukić is listed in Croatia men's Olympic water polo team records and statistics.

=== Top goalscorers ===
The following table is pre-sorted by number of total goals (in descending order), year of the last Olympic appearance (in ascending order), year of the first Olympic appearance (in ascending order), name of the player (in ascending order), respectively.

- Number of goalscorers (50+ goals): 0
- Number of goalscorers (40–49 goals): 0
- Number of goalscorers (30–39 goals): 3
- Last updated: 1 April 2021.

Male players with 30 or more goals at the Olympics
Rk	Player	Birth	L/R	Total goals	Water polo tournaments (goals)					Age of first/last	ISHOF member	Note	Ref
Rk	Player	Birth	L/R	Total goals	1	2	3	4	5	Age of first/last	ISHOF member	Note	Ref
1	Zoran Janković	1940		34	1964 (6)	1968 (21)	1972 (7)			24/32	2004		
2	Mirko Sandić	1942	Right	31	1960 (3)	1964 (6)	1968 (17)	1972 (5)		18/30	1999	Flag bearer for Yugoslavia (1972)	
3	Uroš Marović	1946		30	1968 (10)	1972 (8)	1976 (12)			22/30			

- Official Reports (PDF): 1936–1988.

Note:

- Dubravko Šimenc is listed in Croatia men's Olympic water polo team records and statistics.

=== Goalkeepers ===
The following table is pre-sorted by edition of the Olympics (in ascending order), cap number or name of the goalkeeper (in ascending order), respectively.

Last updated: 23 May 2021.

Year	Cap No.	Goalkeeper	Birth	Age	ISHOF member	Note	Ref
1936		Miro Mihovilović	1915	21		Starting goalkeeper	
1936		(Unknown)					
1948		Zdravko-Ćiro Kovačić	1925	23	1984		
1948		Juraj Amšel	1924	23			
1952 (silver)		Zdravko-Ćiro Kovačić (2)	1925	27	1984	Starting goalkeeper	
1952 (silver)		Juraj Amšel (2)	1924	27			
1956 (silver)		Zdravko-Ćiro Kovačić (3)	1925	31	1984	Flag bearer for Yugoslavia; Starting goalkeeper	
1956 (silver)		Juraj Amšel (3)	1924	31			
1960		Milan Muškatirović	1934	26		Starting goalkeeper	
1960		(Unknown)					
1964 (silver)	1	Milan Muškatirović (2)	1934	30			
1964 (silver)	11	Karlo Stipanić	1941	22			
1968 (gold)	1	Karlo Stipanić (2)	1941	26			
1968 (gold)	11	Zdravko Hebel	1943	25			
1972	1	Karlo Stipanić (3)	1941	30			
1972	11	Miloš Marković	1947	25			
1976	1	Miloš Marković (2)	1947	29			
1976	11	Zoran Kačić	1953	22			
1980 (silver)	1	Luka Vezilić	1948	32			
1980 (silver)	11	Milorad Krivokapić	1956	24			
1984 (gold)	1	Milorad Krivokapić (2)	1956	28			
1984 (gold)	13	Andrija Popović	1959	24			
1988 (gold)	1	Aleksandar Šoštar	1964	24	2011		
1988 (gold)	13	Renco Posinković	1964	24			
Year	Cap No.	Goalkeeper	Birth	Age	ISHOF member	Note	Ref

Note:

- Aleksandar Šoštar is also listed in FR Yugoslavia men's Olympic water polo team records and statistics.

== Coach statistics ==
=== Medals as coach and player ===
The following table is pre-sorted by total number of Olympic medals (in descending order), number of Olympic gold medals (in descending order), number of Olympic silver medals (in descending order), year of winning the last Olympic medal (in ascending order), year of winning the first Olympic medal (in ascending order), name of the person (in ascending order), respectively. Last updated: 5 May 2021.

Ratko Rudić won a silver medal for Yugoslavia at the 1980 Summer Olympics. Upon retirement as an athlete, he immediately entered the coaching ranks. During his career, Rudić guided three different men's national teams to five Olympic medals, more than any other coaches.

Ivo Trumbić won the silver medal in 1964 and Yugoslavia's first Olympic gold medal in water polo in 1968. He moved to the Netherlands in 1973, hired as the head coach of the Netherlands men's national team. At the 1976 Olympics in Montreal, he led the Dutch team to win a bronze medal.

Rk	Person	Birth	Height	Player				Head coach			Total medals				Ref
Rk	Person	Birth	Height	Age	Men's team	Pos	Medal	Age	Men's team	Medal	G	S	B	T	Ref
1	Ratko Rudić	1948	1.88 m (6 ft 2 in)	32	Yugoslavia	FP	1980 (silver)	36–40	Yugoslavia	1984 (gold) , 1988 (gold)	4	1	1	6	
1	Ratko Rudić	1948	1.88 m (6 ft 2 in)	32	Yugoslavia	FP	1980 (silver)	44–48	Italy	1992 (gold) , 1996 (bronze)	4	1	1	6	
1	Ratko Rudić	1948	1.88 m (6 ft 2 in)	32	Yugoslavia	FP	1980 (silver)	64	Croatia	2012 (gold)	4	1	1	6	
2	Ivo Trumbić	1935	1.97 m (6 ft 6 in)	29–33	Yugoslavia	FP	1964 (silver) , 1968 (gold)	41	Netherlands	1976 (bronze)	1	1	1	3	

== Olympic champions ==
=== 1968 Summer Olympics ===
- Edition of men's tournament: 15th
- Host city: Mexico City, Mexico
- Number of participating teams: 15
- Competition format: Round-robin pools advanced teams to classification matches
- Champion: Yugoslavia (1st title; 2nd place in preliminary B group)

Match	Round	Date	Opponent	Result	Goals for	Goals against	Goal diff.
Match 1/9	Preliminary round – Group B	14 October 1968	Egypt	Won	13	2	11
Match 2/9	Preliminary round – Group B	16 October 1968	East Germany	Drawn	4	4	0
Match 3/9	Preliminary round – Group B	17 October 1968	Mexico	Won	9	0	9
Match 4/9	Preliminary round – Group B	19 October 1968	Netherlands	Won	7	4	3
Match 5/9	Preliminary round – Group B	20 October 1968	Italy	Lost	4	5	–1
Match 6/9	Preliminary round – Group B	21 October 1968	Greece	Won	11	1	10
Match 7/9	Preliminary round – Group B	22 October 1968	Japan	Won	17	2	15
Match 8/9	Semi-finals	24 October 1968	Hungary	Won	8	6	2
Match 9/9	Gold medal match	26 October 1968	Soviet Union	Won	13	11	2
Total	Matches played: 9 • Wins: 7 • Ties: 1 • Defeats: 1 • Win %: 77.8%				86	35	51

Source: Official Reports (PDF): 1968 (pp. 812, 814, 816, 817, 819, 822, 824, 826).

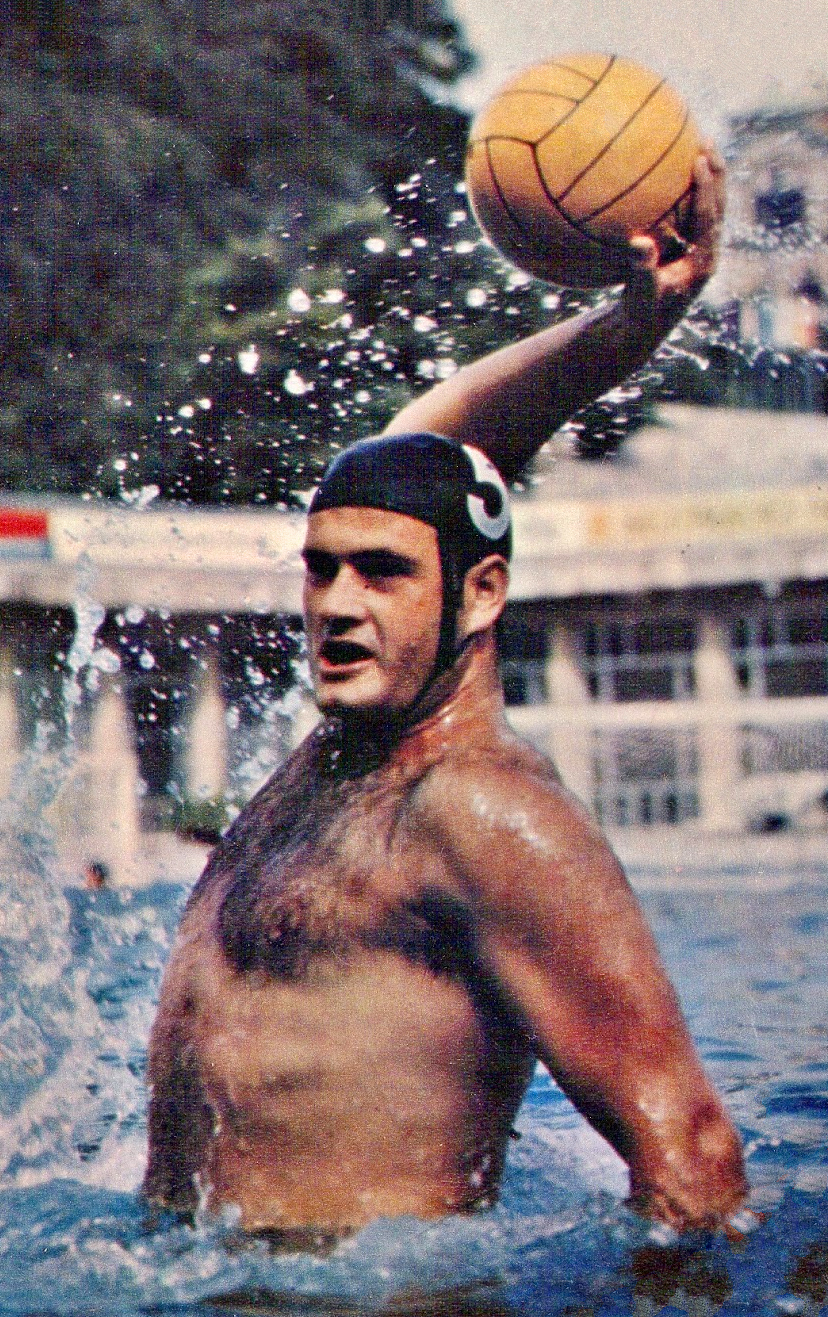
Mirko Sandić scored 17 goals at the 1968 Olympics, helping Yugoslavia win gold.

- Head coach: (Socialist Federal Republic of Yugoslavia) Aleksandar Sajfert (1st title as head coach)

Roster
Cap No.	Player	Pos	Height	Weight	Date of birth	Age of winning gold	Oly debut	Goals	ISHOF member
1	Karlo Stipanić	GK	1.83 m (6 ft 0 in)	85 kg (187 lb)	8 December 1941	26 years, 323 days	No	0	
2	Ivo Trumbić	FP	1.97 m (6 ft 6 in)	103 kg (227 lb)	2 April 1935	33 years, 207 days	No	8	2015
3	Ozren Bonačić	FP	1.96 m (6 ft 5 in)	110 kg (243 lb)	5 January 1942	26 years, 295 days	No	6	
4	Uroš Marović	FP	1.96 m (6 ft 5 in)	94 kg (207 lb)	4 July 1946	22 years, 114 days	Yes	11	
5	Ronald Lopatni	FP	1.88 m (6 ft 2 in)	91 kg (201 lb)	19 September 1944	24 years, 37 days	Yes	3	
6	Zoran Janković	FP	1.78 m (5 ft 10 in)	95 kg (209 lb)	8 January 1940	28 years, 292 days	No	21	2004
7	Miroslav Poljak	FP	1.85 m (6 ft 1 in)	95 kg (209 lb)	3 September 1944	24 years, 53 days	Yes	13	
8	Dejan Dabović	FP	1.90 m (6 ft 3 in)	95 kg (209 lb)	3 August 1944	24 years, 84 days	Yes	1	
9	Đorđe Perišić	FP	1.91 m (6 ft 3 in)	80 kg (176 lb)	6 May 1941	27 years, 173 days	Yes	6	
10	Mirko Sandić	FP	1.98 m (6 ft 6 in)	100 kg (220 lb)	9 May 1942	26 years, 170 days	No	17	1999
11	Zdravko Hebel	GK	1.87 m (6 ft 2 in)	87 kg (192 lb)	21 January 1943	25 years, 279 days	Yes	0	
Average			1.90 m (6 ft 3 in)	94 kg (207 lb)	28 May 1942	26 years, 151 days	Total	86	
Coach	Aleksandar Sajfert								

Sources:

- Official Reports (PDF): 1968 (pp. 812, 814, 816, 817, 819, 822, 824, 826);
- Olympedia: 1968 (men's tournament);
- Sports Reference: 1968 (men's tournament);
- ISHOF.

=== 1984 Summer Olympics ===
- Edition of men's tournament: 19th
- Host city: Los Angeles, United States
- Number of participating teams: 12
- Competition format: Round-robin pools advanced teams to the round-robin final pool
- Champion: Yugoslavia (2nd title; 1st place in preliminary A group; 1st place in final D group)

Match	Round	Date	Opponent	Result	Goals for	Goals against	Goal diff.
Match 1/7	Preliminary round – Group A	1 August 1984	Canada	Won	13	4	9
Match 2/7	Preliminary round – Group A	2 August 1984	China	Won	12	7	5
Match 3/7	Preliminary round – Group A	3 August 1984	Netherlands	Won	9	5	4
Match 4/7	Final round – Group D	6 August 1984	Australia	Won	9	6	3
Match 5/7	Final round – Group D	7 August 1984	West Germany	Won	10	9	1
Match 6/7	Final round – Group D	9 August 1984	Spain	Won	14	8	6
Match 7/7	Final round – Group D	10 August 1984	United States	Drawn	5	5	0
Total	Matches played: 7 • Wins: 6 • Ties: 1 • Defeats: 0 • Win %: 85.7%				72	44	28

Source: Official Reports (PDF): 1984 (pp. 528, 529, 530, 531, 532, 533).

- Head coach: (Socialist Federal Republic of Yugoslavia) Ratko Rudić (1st title as head coach)

Roster
Cap No.	Player	Pos	L/R	Height	Weight	Date of birth	Age of winning gold	Oly debut	Goals	ISHOF member
1	Milorad Krivokapić	GK		1.87 m (6 ft 2 in)	85 kg (187 lb)	8 January 1956	28 years, 215 days	No	0	
2	Deni Lušić	FP		1.90 m (6 ft 3 in)	95 kg (209 lb)	14 April 1962	22 years, 118 days	Yes	7	
3	Zoran Petrović	FP		2.03 m (6 ft 8 in)	98 kg (216 lb)	22 August 1960	23 years, 354 days	Yes	0	
4	Božo Vuletić	FP		1.86 m (6 ft 1 in)	90 kg (198 lb)	1 July 1958	26 years, 40 days	Yes	5	
5	Veselin Đuho	FP		1.87 m (6 ft 2 in)	95 kg (209 lb)	5 January 1960	24 years, 218 days	Yes	8	
6	Zoran Roje	FP		1.93 m (6 ft 4 in)	93 kg (205 lb)	7 October 1955	28 years, 308 days	No	7	
7	Milivoj Bebić	FP		1.88 m (6 ft 2 in)	88 kg (194 lb)	29 August 1959	24 years, 347 days	No	16	2013
8	Perica Bukić	FP		1.98 m (6 ft 6 in)	85 kg (187 lb)	20 February 1966	18 years, 172 days	Yes	0	2008
9	Goran Sukno	FP		1.88 m (6 ft 2 in)	86 kg (190 lb)	6 April 1959	25 years, 126 days	Yes	6	
10	Tomislav Paškvalin	FP	L	2.04 m (6 ft 8 in)	105 kg (231 lb)	29 August 1961	22 years, 347 days	Yes	11	
11	Igor Milanović	FP		1.95 m (6 ft 5 in)	97 kg (214 lb)	18 December 1965	18 years, 236 days	Yes	6	2006
12	Dragan Andrić	FP		1.92 m (6 ft 4 in)	91 kg (201 lb)	6 June 1962	22 years, 65 days	Yes	6	
13	Andrija Popović	GK		1.93 m (6 ft 4 in)	86 kg (190 lb)	22 September 1959	24 years, 323 days	Yes	0	
Average				1.93 m (6 ft 4 in)	92 kg (203 lb)	14 August 1960	23 years, 362 days	Total	72	
Coach	Ratko Rudić			1.88 m (6 ft 2 in)		7 June 1948	36 years, 64 days			2007

Sources:

- Official Reports (PDF): 1984 (pp. 528, 529, 530, 531, 532, 533);
- Olympedia: 1984 (men's tournament);
- Sports Reference: 1984 (men's tournament);
- ISHOF.

=== 1988 Summer Olympics ===
- Edition of men's tournament: 20th
- Host city: Seoul, South Korea
- Number of participating teams: 12
- Competition format: Round-robin pools advanced teams to classification matches
- Champion: Yugoslavia (3rd title; 1st place in preliminary B group)

Match	Round	Date	Opponent	Result	Goals for	Goals against	Goal diff.
Match 1/7	Preliminary round – Group B	21 September 1988	United States	Lost	6	7	–1
Match 2/7	Preliminary round – Group B	22 September 1988	Hungary	Won	10	9	1
Match 3/7	Preliminary round – Group B	23 September 1988	Greece	Won	17	7	10
Match 4/7	Preliminary round – Group B	26 September 1988	Spain	Won	10	8	2
Match 5/7	Preliminary round – Group B	27 September 1988	China	Won	17	7	10
Match 6/7	Semi-finals	30 September 1988	West Germany	Won	14	10	4
Match 7/7	Gold medal match	1 October 1988	United States	Won	9	7	2
Total	Matches played: 7 • Wins: 6 • Ties: 0 • Defeats: 1 • Win %: 85.7%				83	55	28

Source: Official Reports (PDF): 1988 (pp. 593, 594, 595, 597).

- Head coach: (Socialist Federal Republic of Yugoslavia) Ratko Rudić (2nd title as head coach)

Roster
Cap No.	Player	Pos	L/R	Height	Weight	Date of birth	Age of winning gold	Oly debut	Goals	ISHOF member
1	Aleksandar Šoštar	GK		1.96 m (6 ft 5 in)	102 kg (225 lb)	21 January 1964	24 years, 254 days	Yes	0	2011
2	Deni Lušić	FP		1.90 m (6 ft 3 in)	95 kg (209 lb)	14 April 1962	26 years, 170 days	No	10	
3	Dubravko Šimenc	FP	R	2.01 m (6 ft 7 in)	115 kg (254 lb)	2 November 1966	21 years, 334 days	Yes	3	
4	Perica Bukić	FP		1.98 m (6 ft 6 in)	85 kg (187 lb)	20 February 1966	22 years, 224 days	No	10	2008
5	Veselin Đuho	FP		1.87 m (6 ft 2 in)	95 kg (209 lb)	5 January 1960	28 years, 270 days	No	9	
6	Dragan Andrić	FP		1.92 m (6 ft 4 in)	91 kg (201 lb)	6 June 1962	26 years, 117 days	No	11	
7	Mirko Vičević	FP		1.92 m (6 ft 4 in)	82 kg (181 lb)	30 June 1968	20 years, 93 days	Yes	3	
8	Igor Gočanin	FP		1.90 m (6 ft 3 in)	82 kg (181 lb)	24 July 1966	22 years, 69 days	Yes	5	
9	Mislav Bezmalinović	FP		1.97 m (6 ft 6 in)	88 kg (194 lb)	11 May 1967	21 years, 143 days	Yes	4	
10	Tomislav Paškvalin	FP	L	2.04 m (6 ft 8 in)	105 kg (231 lb)	29 August 1961	27 years, 33 days	No	6	
11	Igor Milanović	FP		1.95 m (6 ft 5 in)	97 kg (214 lb)	18 December 1965	22 years, 288 days	No	16	2006
12	Goran Rađenović	FP		1.97 m (6 ft 6 in)	95 kg (209 lb)	4 November 1966	21 years, 332 days	Yes	6	
13	Renco Posinković	GK		1.97 m (6 ft 6 in)	91 kg (201 lb)	4 January 1964	24 years, 271 days	Yes	0	
Average				1.95 m (6 ft 5 in)	94 kg (207 lb)	26 October 1964	23 years, 341 days	Total	83	
Coach	Ratko Rudić			1.88 m (6 ft 2 in)		7 June 1948	40 years, 116 days			2007

Sources:

- Official Reports (PDF): 1988 (pp. 593, 594, 595, 597);
- Olympedia: 1988 (men's tournament);
- Sports Reference: 1988 (men's tournament);
- ISHOF.

== Water polo people at the opening and closing ceremonies ==
=== Flag bearers ===
Some sportspeople were chosen to carry the national flag of their country at the opening and closing ceremonies of the Olympic Games. As of the 1988 Summer Olympics, three male water polo players were given the honour to carry the flag for Yugoslavia.

Legend

- 2008 O – Opening ceremony of the 2008 Summer Olympics
- 2012 C – Closing ceremony of the 2012 Summer Olympics
- Flag bearer^{‡} – Flag bearer who won the tournament with his team

Water polo people who were flag bearers at the opening and closing ceremonies of the Olympic Games
#	Year	Country	Flag bearer	Birth	Age	Height	Team	Pos	Water polo tournaments					Period (age of first/last)	Medals				Ref
#	Year	Country	Flag bearer	Birth	Age	Height	Team	Pos	1	2	3	4	5	Period (age of first/last)	G	S	B	T	Ref
1	1948 O	Yugoslavia	Božo Grkinić	1913	34		Yugoslavia	FP	1948					0 years (34/34)	0	0	0	0	
2	1956 O	Yugoslavia	Zdravko-Ćiro Kovačić	1925	31		Yugoslavia	GK	1948	1952	1956			8 years (23/31)	0	2	0	2	
3	1972 O	Yugoslavia	Mirko Sandić	1942	30	1.98 m (6 ft 6 in)	Yugoslavia	FP	1960	1964	1968	1972		12 years (18/30)	1	1	0	2	

== See also ==
- Croatia men's Olympic water polo team records and statistics
- Serbia and Montenegro men's Olympic water polo team records and statistics
- Montenegro men's Olympic water polo team records and statistics
- Serbia men's Olympic water polo team records and statistics
- List of men's Olympic water polo tournament records and statistics
- Lists of Olympic water polo records and statistics
- Yugoslavia at the Olympics

== Sources ==
=== Official Reports (IOC) ===
PDF documents in the LA84 Foundation Digital Library:

- Official Report of the 1896 Olympic Games (download, archive)
- Official Report of the 1900 Olympic Games (download, archive)
- Official Report of the 1904 Olympic Games (download, archive)
- Official Report of the 1908 Olympic Games (download, archive) (pp. 359–361)
- Official Report of the 1912 Olympic Games (download, archive) (pp. 1021–1024, 1031–1037)
- Official Report of the 1920 Olympic Games (download, archive) (p. 130)
- Official Report of the 1924 Olympic Games (download, archive) (pp. 439–440, 486–494)
- Official Report of the 1928 Olympic Games (download, archive) (pp. 746–757, 797–807)
- Official Report of the 1932 Olympic Games (download, archive) (pp. 619–623, 646–652)
- Official Report of the 1936 Olympic Games, v.2 (download, archive) (pp. 345–356)
- Official Report of the 1948 Olympic Games (download, archive) (pp. 537–540, 640–647)
- Official Report of the 1952 Olympic Games (download, archive) (pp. 600–608)
- Official Report of the 1956 Olympic Games (download, archive) (pp. 592–594, 624–627)
- Official Report of the 1960 Olympic Games (download, archive) (pp. 552–555, 617–634)
- Official Report of the 1964 Olympic Games, v.2 (download, archive) (pp. 682–698)
- Official Report of the 1968 Olympic Games, v.3 (download, archive) (pp. 449–466, 811–826)
- Official Report of the 1972 Olympic Games, v.3 (download, archive) (pp. 331, 353–365)
- Official Report of the 1976 Olympic Games, v.3 (download, archive) (pp. 446–447, 484–497)
- Official Report of the 1980 Olympic Games, v.3 (download, archive) (pp. 458, 495–510)
- Official Report of the 1984 Olympic Games, v.2 (download, archive) (pp. 528–534)
- Official Report of the 1988 Olympic Games, v.2 (download, archive) (pp. 590–598)
- Official Report of the 1992 Olympic Games, v.5 (download, archive) (pp. 354, 386–400)
- Official Report of the 1996 Olympic Games, v.3 (download, archive) (pp. 56–73)

=== Official Results Books (IOC) ===
PDF documents in the LA84 Foundation Digital Library:

- Official Results Book – 2000 Olympic Games – Water Polo (download, archive)
- Official Results Book – 2004 Olympic Games – Water Polo (download, archive)
- Official Results Book – 2008 Olympic Games – Water Polo (download, archive)

PDF documents on the FINA website:

- Official Results Book – 2012 Olympic Games – Diving, Swimming, Synchronised Swimming, Water Polo (archive) (pp. 284–507)

PDF documents in the Olympic World Library:

- Official Results Book – 2016 Olympic Games – Water Polo (archive)

PDF documents on the International Olympic Committee website:

- Official Results Book – 2020 Olympic Games – Water Polo (archive)
- Official Results Book – 2024 Olympic Games – Water Polo

=== Official Reports (FINA) ===
PDF documents on the FINA website:

- HistoFINA – Water polo medalists and statistics (as of September 2019) (archive) (pp. 4–13)
- 1870–2020 | 150 years of Water Polo – Evolution of its rules (archive)

=== Official website (IOC) ===
Water polo on the International Olympic Committee website:

- Water polo
- Men's water polo

=== Olympedia ===
Water polo on the Olympedia website:

- Water polo Archived 2021-12-28 at the Wayback Machine
- Men's water polo
- Athlete count for water polo
- Water polo venues
- Water polo at the 1900 Summer Olympics (men's tournament)
- Water polo at the 1904 Summer Olympics (men's tournament)
- Water polo at the 1908 Summer Olympics (men's tournament)
- Water polo at the 1912 Summer Olympics (men's tournament)
- Water polo at the 1920 Summer Olympics (men's tournament)
- Water polo at the 1924 Summer Olympics (men's tournament)
- Water polo at the 1928 Summer Olympics (men's tournament)
- Water polo at the 1932 Summer Olympics (men's tournament)
- Water polo at the 1936 Summer Olympics (men's tournament)
- Water polo at the 1948 Summer Olympics (men's tournament)
- Water polo at the 1952 Summer Olympics (men's tournament)
- Water polo at the 1956 Summer Olympics (men's tournament)
- Water polo at the 1960 Summer Olympics (men's tournament)
- Water polo at the 1964 Summer Olympics (men's tournament)
- Water polo at the 1968 Summer Olympics (men's tournament)
- Water polo at the 1972 Summer Olympics (men's tournament)
- Water polo at the 1976 Summer Olympics (men's tournament)
- Water polo at the 1980 Summer Olympics (men's tournament)
- Water polo at the 1984 Summer Olympics (men's tournament)
- Water polo at the 1988 Summer Olympics (men's tournament)
- Water polo at the 1992 Summer Olympics (men's tournament)
- Water polo at the 1996 Summer Olympics (men's tournament)
- Water polo at the 2000 Summer Olympics (men's tournament)
- Water polo at the 2004 Summer Olympics (men's tournament)
- Water polo at the 2008 Summer Olympics (men's tournament)
- Water polo at the 2012 Summer Olympics (men's tournament)
- Water polo at the 2016 Summer Olympics (men's tournament)
- Water polo at the 2020 Summer Olympics (men's tournament)

=== Sports Reference ===
Water polo on the Sports Reference website:

- Country Medal Leaders & Athlete Medal Leaders (1900–2016) (archived)
- Men's water polo (1900–2016) (archived)
- Water polo at the 1900 Summer Games (men's tournament) (archived)
- Water polo at the 1904 Summer Games (men's tournament) (archived)
- Water polo at the 1908 Summer Games (men's tournament) (archived)
- Water polo at the 1912 Summer Games (men's tournament) (archived)
- Water polo at the 1920 Summer Games (men's tournament) (archived)
- Water polo at the 1924 Summer Games (men's tournament) (archived)
- Water polo at the 1928 Summer Games (men's tournament) (archived)
- Water polo at the 1932 Summer Games (men's tournament) (archived)
- Water polo at the 1936 Summer Games (men's tournament) (archived)
- Water polo at the 1948 Summer Games (men's tournament) (archived)
- Water polo at the 1952 Summer Games (men's tournament) (archived)
- Water polo at the 1956 Summer Games (men's tournament) (archived)
- Water polo at the 1960 Summer Games (men's tournament) (archived)
- Water polo at the 1964 Summer Games (men's tournament) (archived)
- Water polo at the 1968 Summer Games (men's tournament) (archived)
- Water polo at the 1972 Summer Games (men's tournament) (archived)
- Water polo at the 1976 Summer Games (men's tournament) (archived)
- Water polo at the 1980 Summer Games (men's tournament) (archived)
- Water polo at the 1984 Summer Games (men's tournament) (archived)
- Water polo at the 1988 Summer Games (men's tournament) (archived)
- Water polo at the 1992 Summer Games (men's tournament) (archived)
- Water polo at the 1996 Summer Games (men's tournament) (archived)
- Water polo at the 2000 Summer Games (men's tournament) (archived)
- Water polo at the 2004 Summer Games (men's tournament) (archived)
- Water polo at the 2008 Summer Games (men's tournament) (archived)
- Water polo at the 2012 Summer Games (men's tournament) (archived)
- Water polo at the 2016 Summer Games (men's tournament) (archived)
- Water polo at the 2020 Summer Games (men's tournament) (archived)

=== Todor66 ===
Water polo on the Todor66 website:

- Water polo at the Summer Games
- Water polo at the 1900 Summer Olympics (men's tournament)
- Water polo at the 1904 Summer Olympics (men's tournament)
- Water polo at the 1908 Summer Olympics (men's tournament)
- Water polo at the 1912 Summer Olympics (men's tournament)
- Water polo at the 1920 Summer Olympics (men's tournament)
- Water polo at the 1924 Summer Olympics (men's tournament)
- Water polo at the 1928 Summer Olympics (men's tournament)
- Water polo at the 1932 Summer Olympics (men's tournament)
- Water polo at the 1936 Summer Olympics (men's tournament)
- Water polo at the 1948 Summer Olympics (men's tournament)
- Water polo at the 1952 Summer Olympics (men's tournament)
- Water polo at the 1956 Summer Olympics (men's tournament)
- Water polo at the 1960 Summer Olympics (men's tournament)
- Water polo at the 1964 Summer Olympics (men's tournament)
- Water polo at the 1968 Summer Olympics (men's tournament, men's qualification)
- Water polo at the 1972 Summer Olympics (men's tournament, men's qualification)
- Water polo at the 1976 Summer Olympics (men's tournament, men's European qualification)
- Water polo at the 1980 Summer Olympics (men's tournament, men's European qualification, men's world qualification)
- Water polo at the 1984 Summer Olympics (men's tournament, men's qualification)
- Water polo at the 1988 Summer Olympics (men's tournament, men's qualification)
- Water polo at the 1992 Summer Olympics (men's tournament, men's qualification)
- Water polo at the 1996 Summer Olympics (men's tournament, men's qualification)
- Water polo at the 2000 Summer Olympics (men's tournament, men's qualification)
- Water polo at the 2004 Summer Olympics (men's tournament, men's qualification)
- Water polo at the 2008 Summer Olympics (men's tournament, men's qualification)
- Water polo at the 2012 Summer Olympics (men's tournament, men's qualification)
- Water polo at the 2016 Summer Olympics (men's tournament, men's qualification)
- Water polo at the 2020 Summer Olympics (men's tournament, men's qualification)
- Water polo at the 2024 Summer Olympics (men's tournament, men's qualification)

=== ISHOF ===
International Swimming Hall of Fame (ISHOF) website:

- Honorees Listed by Category – Water Polo
- Honorees Listed by Category – Coaches
- Honorees Listed by Category – Contributors
- Honorees by Country
- Honorees By Last Name
