= List of flag bearers for Yugoslavia at the Olympics =

Yugoslavia at the Olympics
- IOC code: YUG
- NOC: Yugoslav Olympic Committee
- Medals: Gold 28 Silver 34 Bronze 35 Total 97

Summer appearances
- 1920; 1924; 1928; 1932; 1936; 1948; 1952; 1956; 1960; 1964; 1968; 1972; 1976; 1980; 1984; 1988; 1992; 1996; 2000

Winter appearances
- 1924; 1928; 1932; 1936; 1948; 1952; 1956; 1960; 1964; 1968; 1972; 1976; 1980; 1984; 1988; 1992; 1994; 1998; 2002

Other related appearances
- Serbia (1912, 2008–); Croatia (1992–); Slovenia (1992–); Bosnia and Herzegovina (1992 S–); Independent Olympic Participants (1992 S); North Macedonia (1996–); Serbia and Montenegro (1996–2006); Montenegro (2008–); Kosovo (2016–)

This is a list of flag bearers who have represented Yugoslavia at the Olympics.

Flag bearers carry the national flag of their country at the opening ceremony of the Olympic Games.

== List ==
#	Event year	Season	Flag bearer	Sport
1	1924	Winter	Dušan Zinaja	Cross-country skiing
2	1924	Summer	Stanko Perpar	Athletics
3	1928	Winter		
4	1928	Summer	Dimitrije Stefanović	Athletics
5	1932	Summer	Veljko Narančić	Athletics
6	1936	Winter		
7	1936	Summer	Milan Stepišnik	Athletics
8	1948	Winter		
9	1948	Summer	Božo Grkinić	Water polo
10	1952	Winter		
11	1952	Summer	Oto Rebula	Athletics
12	1956	Winter		
13	1956	Summer	Zdravko-Ćiro Kovačić	Water polo
14	1960	Summer	Radovan Radović	Basketball
15	1964	Winter		
16	1964	Summer	Miroslav Cerar	Gymnastics
17	1968	Winter		
18	1968	Summer	Branislav Simić	Wrestling
19	1972	Winter	Viktor Ravnik	Ice hockey
20	1972	Summer	Mirko Sandić	Water polo
21	1976	Winter		
22	1976	Summer	Hrvoje Horvat	Handball
23	1980	Winter	Bojan Križaj	Alpine skiing
24	1980	Summer	Matija Ljubek	Canoeing
25	1984	Winter	Jure Franko	Alpine skiing
26	1984	Summer	Dražen Dalipagić	Basketball
27	1988	Winter	Bojan Križaj	Alpine skiing
28	1988	Summer	Matija Ljubek	Canoeing
29	1992	Winter		

== See also ==
- Yugoslavia at the Olympics
- List of flag bearers for Bosnia and Herzegovina at the Olympics
- List of flag bearers for Croatia at the Olympics
- List of flag bearers for Kosovo at the Olympics
- List of flag bearers for Montenegro at the Olympics
- List of flag bearers for North Macedonia at the Olympics
- List of flag bearers for Serbia at the Olympics
- List of flag bearers for Serbia and Montenegro at the Olympics
- List of flag bearers for Slovenia at the Olympics
