= Trumbić =

Trumbić is a surname. Notable people with the surname include:

- Ante Trumbić (1864–1938), Croatian politician
- Ivo Trumbić (1935–2021), Croatian water polo player
