= Mislav Bezmalinović =

Croatian water polo player (1967–2024)

Personal information
- Born: 11 May 1967 Split, SR Croatia, SFR Yugoslavia
- Died: 31 August 2024 (aged 57) Split, Croatia
- Height: 197 cm (6 ft 6 in)
- Weight: 88 kg (194 lb)

Sport
- Sport: Water polo
Medal record
Representing Yugoslavia
Olympic Games
Gold medal – first place	1988 Seoul	Team
World Championships
Gold medal – first place	1991 Perth	Team
European Championships
Silver medal – second place	1987 Strasbourg	Team
Silver medal – second place	1989 Bonn	Team
Mediterranean Games
Silver medal – second place	1991 Athens	Team

Mislav Bezmalinović (11 May 1967 – 31 August 2024) was a Yugoslav and Croatian water polo player.

Bezmalinović won an Olympic gold medal playing for Yugoslavia at the 1988 Summer Olympics in Seoul. died in Split on 31 August 2024, at the age of 57.

== See also ==
- Yugoslavia men's Olympic water polo team records and statistics
- List of Olympic champions in men's water polo
- List of Olympic medalists in water polo (men)
- List of world champions in men's water polo
- List of World Aquatics Championships medalists in water polo
