= Zoran Kačić =

Croatian water polo player

Personal information
- Nationality: Croatian
- Born: 9 September 1953 (age 71); Split, Yugoslavia

Sport
- Sport: Water polo

Zoran Kačić (born 9 September 1953) is a Croatian water polo player. He competed in the men's tournament at the 1976 Summer Olympics.

== See also ==
- Yugoslavia men's Olympic water polo team records and statistics
- List of men's Olympic water polo tournament goalkeepers
