= Igor Gočanin =

Montenegrin water polo player

Personal information
- Born: 24 July 1966 (age 59) Herceg Novi, SFR Yugoslavia
Medal record
Men's water polo
Representing Yugoslavia
Olympic Games
Gold medal – first place	1988 Seoul	Team competition

Igor Gočanin (July 24, 1966) is a Yugoslav water polo player. He was part of the Yugoslavia team which won the gold medal in water polo in the 1988 Summer Olympics.

== See also ==
- Yugoslavia men's Olympic water polo team records and statistics
- List of Olympic champions in men's water polo
- List of Olympic medalists in water polo (men)
