= Milorad Krivokapić (water polo) =

Water polo player

Personal information
- Born: 8 January 1956 (age 70) Herceg Novi, FPR Yugoslavia

Sport
- Sport: Water polo
Medal record
Representing Yugoslavia
Olympic Games
Gold medal – first place	1984 Los Angeles	Team competition
Silver medal – second place	1980 Moscow	Team competition
World Championships
Gold medal – first place	1986 Madrid	Team competition
European Championships
Silver medal – second place	1985 Sofia	Team competition
Mediterranean Games
Gold medal – first place	1979 Split	Team competition
Gold medal – first place	1983 Casablanca	Team competition

Milorad Krivokapić (born 8 January 1956) is a retired Serbian water polo player. He won a silver Olympic gold medal winner with Yugoslavia at the 1980 Summer Olympics and a gold medal at the 1984 Summer Olympics. He is currently president of Serbian water polo association.

== See also ==
- Yugoslavia men's Olympic water polo team records and statistics
- List of Olympic champions in men's water polo
- List of Olympic medalists in water polo (men)
- List of men's Olympic water polo tournament goalkeepers
- List of world champions in men's water polo
- List of World Aquatics Championships medalists in water polo
