= Juraj Amšel =

Croatian water polo player (1924–1988)

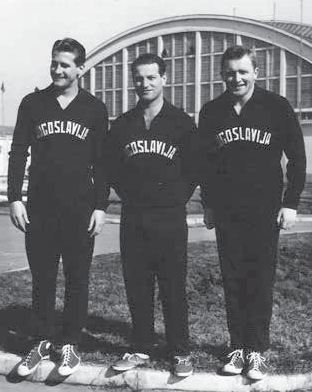
- Amšel (center) in 1956

Personal information
- Born: 17 December 1924 Zagreb, Yugoslavia
- Died: August 7, 1988 (aged 63) Zagreb, Yugoslavia

Sport
- Sport: Water polo
- Club: HAVK Mladost
Medal record
Representing Yugoslavia
Olympic Games
Silver medal – second place	1952 Helsinki	Team competition
Silver medal – second place	1956 Melbourne	Team competition

Juraj Amšel (17 December 1924 – 7 August 1988) was a Croatian water polo player who competed for Yugoslavia in the 1948 Summer Olympics.

Amšel was part of the Yugoslav team that was eliminated in the second round of the 1948 Olympic tournament. He played two matches. Four years later he was a squad member of the Yugoslav Olympic team in the 1952 tournament but did not play in a match. Again in 1956 he was a squad member but did not play a single match in the 1956 tournament.

== See also ==
- Yugoslavia men's Olympic water polo team records and statistics
- List of men's Olympic water polo tournament goalkeepers
