= Zdravko Kovačić =

Croatian water polo player (1925–2015)

Personal information
- Nickname: Ćiro
- Nationality: Croatian
- Born: 6 July 1925 Šibenik, Kingdom of Serbs, Croats and Slovenes
- Died: 1 April 2015 (aged 89) Rijeka, Croatia

Sport
- Sport: Water polo
- Position: Goalkeeper

Senior clubs
- Years: Team
- Melbourne 1956: JŠK Victoria, VK Primorje
National team
Years	Team	Apps	(Gls)
1948-1956	Yugoslavia	87	(0)
Medal record
Men's water polo
Representing Yugoslavia
Olympic Games
Silver medal – second place	1952 Helsinki	Team competition
Silver medal – second place	1956 Melbourne	Team competition
European Championship
Bronze medal – third place	1950 Vienna	Team competition
Silver medal – second place	1954 Turin	Team competition

Zdravko "Ćiro" Kovačić (6 July 1925 – 1 April 2015) was a Croatian water polo player who competed for Yugoslavia in the 1948 Summer Olympics, in the 1952 Summer Olympics, and in the 1956 Summer Olympics.

Kovačič was born in Šibenik in 1925 (at the time Kingdom of Serbs, Croats and Slovenes), but moved to Sušak the next year and therefore considered himself a native of Rijeka.

Kovačić was part of the Yugoslav team which was eliminated in the second round of the 1948 Olympic tournament. He played one match as goalkeeper.

Four years later he won the silver medal with the Yugoslav team in the 1952 tournament. He played all nine matches as goalkeeper.

In 1956 he was a member of the Yugoslav team which won the silver medal in the Olympic competition again. He played all seven matches as goalkeeper. He was given the honour to carry the national flag of Yugoslavia at the opening ceremony of the 1956 Summer Olympics, becoming the ninth water polo player to be a flag bearer at the opening and closing ceremonies of the Olympics.

He died in Rijeka.

== See also ==
- Yugoslavia men's Olympic water polo team records and statistics
- List of Olympic medalists in water polo (men)
- List of men's Olympic water polo tournament goalkeepers
- List of flag bearers for Yugoslavia at the Olympics
- List of members of the International Swimming Hall of Fame

Olympic Games
Preceded by Oto Rebula	Flagbearer for Yugoslavia; Melbourne 1956	Succeeded by Radovan Radović
