= Andrija Popović =

Montenegrin politician

Andrija Popović Андрија Поповић
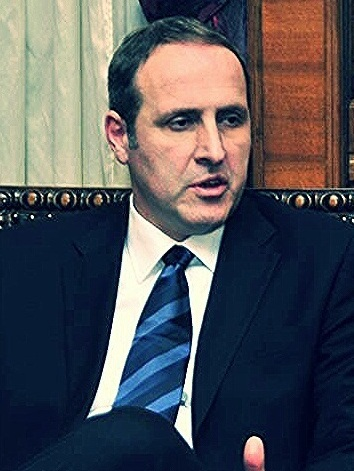

Member of Parliament
- Incumbent
- Assumed office 29 March 2009
- President: Ranko Krivokapić; Darko Pajović; Ivan Brajović; Aleksa Bečić

Personal details
- Born: September 22, 1959 (age 66) Kotor, Montenegro, Yugoslavia
- Party: Liberal Party of Montenegro
- Profession: Water polo player, politician
- Sports career
Medal record
Men's water polo
Representing Yugoslavia
Olympic Games
Gold medal – first place	1984 Los Angeles	Team

Andrija Popović (Montenegrin Cyrillic: Андрија Поповић; born 22 September 1959) is a former Montenegrin liberal politician and former professional water polo player. He is the ex-president of the Liberal Party of Montenegro. Popović lives in Kotor, Montenegro.

== Sports career ==
Popovic is one of Montenegrin athletes with the highest number of medals. He was a member of the water polo team of Yugoslavia and winner of the gold medal at the 1984 Summer Olympics, the gold medal at the World Championships in 1986, and the silver medal at the European Championships in 1985 and 1987. While playing for the ”Mladost”, Zagreb he won two European Champions Cup in 1989/90 and 1990/91. He was awarded as the best athlete of Montenegro in 1985. He was Vice President of the Montenegrin Olympic Committee and the Montenegrin Olympians Club president.

He is currently the Secretary General of the Montenegrin Olympic Committee.

== Political career ==
He started his political career in the Liberal Alliance of Montenegro (LSCG) as coordinator for sport. After decision of Liberal Alliance of Montenegro to freeze its work in 2005, Popović opted to join the party's ex-members who were formerly excluded from LSCG due to corruption charges, gathered around the newly formed Liberal Party of Montenegro (LP) led by Miodrag Živković.

He was a member of the Parliament of Montenegro in 2008-2009. After the 2009 parliamentary elections LP lost its parliamentary status and the old leadership of LP together with its leader Miodrag Živković resigned during the extraordinary conference of the Liberal Party on 20 June 2009. Following this decision, Popović was elected as President of LP. He was a member of the Council of the European Movement for Independent Montenegro at the state and municipal level.

At the 2012 parliamentary elections LP entered the coalition with governing parties DPS and SDP, thus gaining one seat in the Parliament, which was occupied by Popović. Due to internal disagreements, Liberal Party froze its membership in the Coalition for European Montenegro, and is acting in the Parliament in the group with the minority parties (Croatian and Albanian minority representatives). However, this change has been only formal, because the minority group is also an integral part of the ruling majority. During the Fourth Regular Conference of the Liberal Party of Montenegro that was held on 14 September 2013, Popović has been re-elected as President of the Liberal Party of Montenegro.

== See also ==
- Yugoslavia men's Olympic water polo team records and statistics
- List of Olympic champions in men's water polo
- List of Olympic medalists in water polo (men)
- List of men's Olympic water polo tournament goalkeepers
- List of world champions in men's water polo
- List of World Aquatics Championships medalists in water polo
