= Božo Vuletić =

Croatian water polo player

Personal information
- Born: 1 July 1958 (age 67) Dubrovnik
Medal record
Men's Water polo
Representing Yugoslavia
Olympic Games
Gold medal – first place	1984 Los Angeles	Team

Božo Vuletić (born 1 July 1958) is a Croatian former water polo player and coach. He won an Olympic gold medal as a member of the Yugoslav water polo team at the 1984 Olympics.

== See also ==
- Yugoslavia men's Olympic water polo team records and statistics
- List of Olympic champions in men's water polo
- List of Olympic medalists in water polo (men)
