= Renco Posinković =

Croatian water polo player

Personal information
- Born: 4 January 1964 (age 62) Split, SFR Yugoslavia
- Height: 197 cm (6 ft 6 in)
- Weight: 91 kg (201 lb)

Sport
- Sport: Water polo
Medal record
Representing Yugoslavia
Olympic Games
Gold medal – first place	1988 Seoul	Team competition
World Championships
Gold medal – first place	1991 Perth	Team competition

Renco Posinković (Ренцо Посинковић, born 4 January 1964) is a former Yugoslav and Croatian water polo player and coach. He was part of the Yugoslavia team which won the gold medal in water polo in the 1988 Summer Olympics.

== See also ==
- Yugoslavia men's Olympic water polo team records and statistics
- List of Olympic champions in men's water polo
- List of Olympic medalists in water polo (men)
- List of men's Olympic water polo tournament goalkeepers
- List of world champions in men's water polo
- List of World Aquatics Championships medalists in water polo
