= Dragan Andrić (water polo) =

Water polo player

Personal information
- Born: 6 June 1962 (age 64) Dubrovnik, Yugoslavia

Sport
- Sport: Water polo
Medal record
Representing Yugoslavia
Olympic Games
Gold medal – first place	1984 Los Angeles	Team competition
Gold medal – first place	1988 Seoul	Team competition
European Championships
Silver medal – second place	1985 Sofia	Team competition
Silver medal – second place	1987 Strasbourg	Team competition
Summer Universiade
Bronze medal – third place	1987 Zagreb	Team competition
Mediterranean Games
Gold medal – first place	1983 Casablanca	Team competition

Dragan Andrić (born 6 June 1962) is a Yugoslav former water polo player, two times Olympic gold medalist.

He played for VK Partizan, Pescara, CN Catalunya and coached Chios and Panathinaikos in Greece.

Andrić coached FR Yugoslavian team at the 1996 Summer Olympics, national teams of Japan and Greece.

== See also ==
- Yugoslavia men's Olympic water polo team records and statistics
- List of Olympic champions in men's water polo
- List of Olympic medalists in water polo (men)
- List of world champions in men's water polo
- List of World Aquatics Championships medalists in water polo
