= Milan Muškatirović =

Yugoslav water polo player (1934–1993)

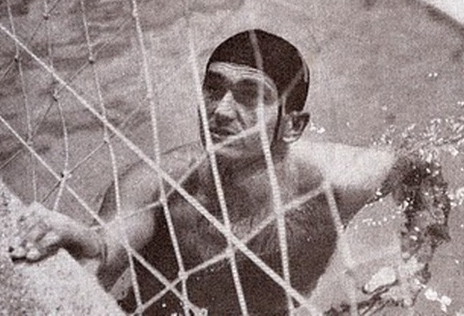

Personal information
- Born: 9 March 1934 Bihać, Vrbas Banovina, Kingdom of Yugoslavia
- Died: 27 September 1993 (aged 59) Belgrade, Serbia, FR Yugoslavia
- Education: University of Belgrade
- Height: 192 cm (6 ft 4 in)
- Weight: 93 kg (205 lb)

Sport
- Sport: Water polo
- Club: Partizan Belgrade
Medal record
Representing Yugoslavia
Olympic Games
Silver medal – second place	1964 Tokyo	Team
European Water Polo Championships
Silver medal – second place	1958 Budapest	Team
Mediterranean Games
Silver medal – second place	1963 Naples	Team

Milan "Gale" Muškatirović (9 March 1934 – 27 September 1993) was a Yugoslav water polo goalkeeper. He is considered to have been one of the best goalkeepers of his era. He was part of the Yugoslav teams that won a silver medal at the 1964 Olympics and placed fourth in 1960. He won another silver medal at the 1958 European Championships. In 1959 he graduated from the University of Belgrade, and since 1965 worked as professor of organic chemistry there.

== See also ==
- Yugoslavia men's Olympic water polo team records and statistics
- List of Olympic medalists in water polo (men)
- List of men's Olympic water polo tournament goalkeepers
