= Miro Mihovilović =

Croatian water polo player

Personal information
- Nationality: Croatian
- Born: 22 February 1915; Split, Austria-Hungary
- Died: 12 February 2010 (aged 94); Zagreb, Croatia

Sport
- Sport: Water polo

Miro Mihovilović (22 February 1915 – 12 February 2010) was a Croatian water polo player. He competed in the men's tournament at the 1936 Summer Olympics. In 1958, he was elected as a Corresponding Fellow in the prestigious American Academy of Physical Education (now known as the National Academy of Kinesiology).

== See also ==
- Yugoslavia men's Olympic water polo team records and statistics
- List of men's Olympic water polo tournament goalkeepers
