= Deni Lušić =

Croatian water polo player

Personal information
- Born: 14 April 1962 (age 64) Split, Yugoslavia
- Height: 190 cm (6 ft 3 in)
- Weight: 111 kg (245 lb)
Medal record
Men's water polo
Olympic Games
Representing Yugoslavia
Gold medal – first place	1984 Los Angeles	Team competition
Gold medal – first place	1988 Seoul	Team competition
World Championship
Representing Yugoslavia
Gold medal – first place	1986 Madrid	Team competition
European Championship
Representing Yugoslavia
Silver medal – second place	1985 Sofia	Team competition
Silver medal – second place	1987 Strasbourg	Team competition
Mediterranean Games
Representing Croatia
Silver medal – second place	1993 Languedoc- -Roussillon	Team competition

Deni Lušić (born 14 April 1962 in Split) is a Croatian water polo coach and former water polo player. He is a double Olympic gold medal winner with Yugoslavia at the 1984 and 1988 Summer Olympics.

== See also ==
- Yugoslavia men's Olympic water polo team records and statistics
- List of Olympic champions in men's water polo
- List of Olympic medalists in water polo (men)
- List of world champions in men's water polo
- List of World Aquatics Championships medalists in water polo
