= East Germany men's national water polo team =

Men's national water polo team representing East Germany

East Germany
- FINA code: GDR
- Confederation: LEN (Europe)

Olympic Games
- Appearances: 1 (first in 1968)
- Best result: 6th place (1968)

The East Germany men's national water polo team was the representative for East Germany in international men's water polo.

== Results ==
=== Olympic Games ===
- As United Team of Germany (see Germany men's national water polo team)
  - 1964 – 6th place (Note: East Germany won the play-off and represented the United Team of Germany in 1964)
- As East Germany
  - 1968 — 6th place
