= Ivo Cipci =

Croatian water polo player

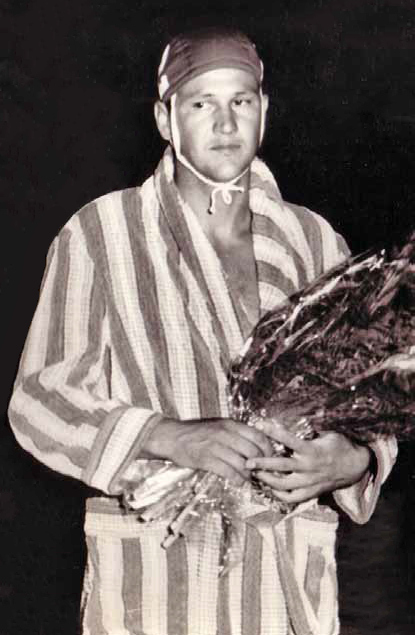

Personal information
- Born: 25 April 1933 (age 93) Split, Kingdom of Yugoslavia

Sport
- Sport: Water polo
- Club: VK Jadran, Split
Medal record
Representing Yugoslavia
Olympic Games
Silver medal – second place	1956 Melbourne	Team
European Water Polo Championships
Silver medal – second place	1958 Budapest	Team

Ivica "Ivo" Cipci (born 25 April 1933) is a retired Croatian water polo player. He was part of the Yugoslav teams that won silver medals at the 1956 Olympics and 1958 European Championships. At the 1956 Olympics he played all seven matches and was the tournament's top scorer.

Cipci took up swimming in 1946, but soon changed to water polo, and won the national title with VK Jadran in 1954, 1957 and 1961. In 1970 he became a board member of Jadran, and from 1974 to 1994 acted as president of the club or/and of its water polo section. He is married to the Slovenian swimmer Majda Majcen.

== See also ==
- List of Olympic medalists in water polo (men)
