= Water polo at the 1968 Summer Olympics =

Water polo at the Games of the XIX Olympiad
- Venues: Francisco Márquez Olympic Pool
- Date: 14–26 October 1968
- Competitors: 162 from 15 nations

Medalists
| 1st place, gold medalist(s) | | Yugoslavia |
| 2nd place, silver medalist(s) | | Soviet Union |
| 3rd place, bronze medalist(s) | | Hungary |

The water polo tournament at the 1968 Summer Olympics was held from 14 to 25 October 1968, in Mexico City, Mexico.

== Qualification ==
| Event | Dates | Hosts | Quotas | Qualified teams |
|---|---|---|---|---|
| Host Nation | 18 October 1963 | (West Germany) Baden-Baden | 1 | Mexico |
| 1964 Summer Olympics | 11-18 October 1964 | (Japan) Tokyo | ~~6~~ 5 | Hungary Yugoslavia Soviet Union Italy ~~Romania~~ East Germany |
| 1967 Pan American Games | 26 July - 1 August 1967 | (Canada) Winnipeg | 3 | United States Brazil Cuba |
| European Qualifier | 3-8 June 1968 | (Italy) Milan | 3 | West Germany Netherlands Spain |
| Oceania Qualifier | | | ~~1~~ | ~~Australia~~ |
| Asian Qualifier | | | 1 | Japan |
| African Qualifier | | | 1 | Egypt |
| Reallocation | | | 1 | Greece |
| Total | | | ~~16~~ 15 | |

== Groups ==
GROUP A

- Australia (excluded)
- Brazil
- Cuba
- Hungary
- Soviet Union
- Spain
- United States
- West Germany

GROUP B

- East Germany
- Egypt
- Greece
- Italy
- Japan
- Mexico
- Netherlands
- Yugoslavia

While Australia had been accepted as one of the 16 teams, the Australian Olympic Committee, considering it a waste of money to send a team, did not endorse them. The players responded by paying their own way to travel to Mexico City, but after the AOC informed the organisers, the team were barred from competing.

== Preliminary round ==
=== Group A ===
| | Team | Points | G | W | D | L | GF | GA | Diff |
|---|---|---|---|---|---|---|---|---|---|
| 1. | Hungary | 12 | 6 | 6 | 0 | 0 | 39 | 14 | +25 |
| 2. | Soviet Union | 10 | 6 | 5 | 0 | 1 | 43 | 18 | +25 |
| 3. | United States | 7 | 6 | 3 | 1 | 2 | 37 | 36 | +1 |
| 4. | Cuba | 7 | 6 | 3 | 1 | 2 | 31 | 35 | –4 |
| 5. | West Germany | 4 | 6 | 2 | 0 | 4 | 33 | 34 | –1 |
| 6. | Spain | 1 | 6 | 0 | 1 | 5 | 20 | 37 | –17 |
| 7. | Brazil | 1 | 6 | 0 | 1 | 5 | 22 | 51 | –29 |

- 14 October 1968

| United States | 10 – 5 | Brazil |
| Soviet Union | 11 – 4 | Cuba |
| West Germany | 5 – 3 | Spain |

- 15 October 1968

| Cuba | 9 – 2 | Brazil |

- 16 October 1968

| Hungary | 6 – 4 | West Germany |
| United States | 10 – 7 | Spain |

- 17 October 1968

| Soviet Union | 6 – 3 | West Germany |
| Cuba | 6 – 6 | United States |
| Hungary | 7 – 1 | Spain |

- 19 October 1968

| Soviet Union | 5 – 0 | Spain |
| Hungary | 5 – 1 | United States |
| West Germany | 10 – 5 | Brazil |

- 20 October 1968

| Cuba | 7 – 6 | West Germany |
| Spain | 6 – 6 | Brazil |
| Hungary | 6 – 5 | Soviet Union |

- 21 October 1968

| Cuba | 4 – 3 | Spain |
| Soviet Union | 8 – 3 | United States |
| Hungary | 8 – 2 | Brazil |

- 22 October 1968

| Soviet Union | 8 – 2 | Brazil |
| United States | 7 – 5 | West Germany |
| Hungary | 7 – 1 | Cuba |

=== Group B ===
| | Team | Points | G | W | D | L | GF | GA | Diff |
|---|---|---|---|---|---|---|---|---|---|
| 1. | Italy | 13 | 7 | 6 | 1 | 0 | 48 | 21 | +27 |
| 2. | Yugoslavia | 11 | 7 | 5 | 1 | 1 | 65 | 18 | +47 |
| 3. | East Germany | 11 | 7 | 5 | 1 | 1 | 66 | 22 | +44 |
| 4. | Netherlands | 9 | 7 | 4 | 1 | 2 | 42 | 28 | +14 |
| 5. | Japan | 6 | 7 | 3 | 0 | 4 | 26 | 57 | –31 |
| 6. | Mexico | 3 | 7 | 1 | 1 | 5 | 27 | 56 | –29 |
| 7. | Greece | 2 | 7 | 1 | 0 | 6 | 34 | 62 | –28 |
| 8. | Egypt | 1 | 7 | 0 | 1 | 6 | 21 | 65 | –44 |

- 14 October 1968

| Netherlands | 9 – 5 | Greece |
| Yugoslavia | 13 – 2 | Egypt |
| Italy | 9 – 2 | Japan |
| Mexico | 4 – 12 | East Germany |

- 15 October 1968

| Japan | 8 – 7 | Greece |
| Italy | 10 – 1 | Egypt |
| East Germany | 4 – 4 | Yugoslavia |

- 16 October 1968

| Mexico | 1 – 8 | Netherlands |
| Greece | 7 – 6 | Egypt |
| Italy | 5 – 4 | East Germany |

- 17 October 1968

| Mexico | 0 – 9 | Yugoslavia |
| Netherlands | 9 – 1 | Japan |

- 19 October 1968

| East Germany | 11 – 4 | Greece |
| Japan | 7 – 4 | Egypt |
| Mexico | 5 – 10 | Italy |
| Yugoslavia | 7 – 4 | Netherlands |

- 20 October 1968

| Italy | 5 – 4 | Yugoslavia |
| East Germany | 8 – 0 | Japan |
| Mexico | 11 – 8 | Greece |
| Netherlands | 6 – 3 | Egypt |

- 21 October 1968

| Mexico | 3 – 6 | Japan |
| Yugoslavia | 11 – 1 | Greece |
| Netherlands | 3 – 3 | Italy |
| East Germany | 19 – 2 | Egypt |

- 22 October 1968

| Mexico | 3 – 3 | Egypt |
| Italy | 6 – 2 | Greece |
| East Germany | 8 – 3 | Netherlands |
| Yugoslavia | 17 – 2 | Japan |

== Classification round ==
- 24 October 1968 — 13th/15th place

| Brazil | 5 – 3 | Egypt |

- 24 October 1968 — 9th/12th place

| Mexico | 3 – 6 | West Germany |
| Spain | 5 – 0 | Japan |

- 24 October 1968 — 5th/8th place

| East Germany | 8 – 2 | Cuba |
| United States | 6 – 3 | Netherlands |

- 24 October 1968 — Semi Finals

| Yugoslavia | 8 – 6 | Hungary |
| Soviet Union | 8 – 5 | Italy |

== Final round ==
- 25 October 1968 — 13th place

| Brazil | 5 – 2 | Greece |

- 25 October 1968 — 11th place

| Mexico | 5 – 4 | Japan |

- 25 October 1968 — 9th place

| Spain | 7 – 5 | West Germany |

- 25 October 1968 — 7th place

| Netherlands | 8 – 5 | Cuba |

- 25 October 1968 — 5th place

| United States | 6 – 4 | East Germany |

- 25 October 1968 — Bronze Medal Match

| Hungary | 9 – 4 | Italy |

- 25 October 1968 — Gold Medal Match

| Yugoslavia | 13 – 11 [aet] | Soviet Union |

=== Final rankings ===
| Rank | Team |
|---|---|
| Gold medal | Yugoslavia |
| Silver medal | Soviet Union |
| Bronze medal | Hungary |
| 4. | Italy |
| 5. | United States |
| 6. | East Germany |
| 7. | Netherlands |
| 8. | Cuba |
| 9. | Spain |
| 10. | West Germany |
| 11. | Mexico |
| 12. | Japan |
| 13. | Brazil |
| 14. | Greece |
| 15. | Egypt |

1968 Men's Olympic Games winners

Yugoslavia
First title

== Medallists ==
| Gold | Silver | Bronze |
|---|---|---|
| Yugoslavia Ozren Bonačić; Dejan Dabović; Zdravko Hebel; Zoran Janković; Ronald Lopatni; Uroš Marović; Đorđe Perišić; Miroslav Poljak; Mirko Sandić; Karlo Stipanić; Ivo Trumbić Coach: Aleksandar Sajfert | Soviet Union Vadim Gulyaev; Givi Chikvanaya; Boris Grishin; Aleksandr Dolgushin; Aleksei Barkalov; Yuri Grigorovsky; Vladimir Semyonov; Aleksandr Shidlovsky; Vyacheslav Skok; Leonid Osipov; Oleg Bovin Coach: Anatoly Blyumental | Hungary András Bodnár; Zoltán Dömötör; László Felkai; Ferenc Konrád; János Konrád; Mihály Mayer; László Sárosi; János Steinmetz; Endre Molnár; Dénes Pócsik; István Szívós, Jr. Coach: Kalman Markovits |

== Sources ==
- PDF documents in the LA84 Foundation Digital Library:
  - Official Report of the 1968 Olympic Games, v.3 (download, archive) (pp. 449–466, 811–826)
- Water polo on the Olympedia website
  - Water polo at the 1968 Summer Olympics (men's tournament)
- Water polo on the Sports Reference website
  - Water polo at the 1968 Summer Games (men's tournament) (archived)
