= Veselin Đuho =

Croatian water polo player

Personal information
- Nationality: Croatian
- Born: 5 January 1960 (age 66) Foča, PR Bosnia and Herzegovina, FPR Yugoslavia
- Height: 187 cm (74 in)
- Weight: 95 kg (209 lb)

Sport
- Sport: Water polo

Teams coached
- –: Cagliari
- 1997–2003: Jug
- –: VK Koper
- 2012–2014: Jug
- –: Olympiacos
Medal record
Men's water polo
Representing Yugoslavia
Olympic Games
Gold medal – first place	1984 Los Angeles	Team competition
Gold medal – first place	1988 Seoul	Team competition
World Championships
Gold medal – first place	1986 Madrid	Team competition
European Championships
Silver medal – second place	1985 Sofia	Team competition
Silver medal – second place	1987 Strasbourg	Team competition

Veselin Đuho (Веселин Ђухо, born 5 January 1960) is a Croatian professional water polo coach and former player who was a two-time Olympic gold medalist for Yugoslavia at the 1984 and 1988 Summer Olympics.

Đuho was born in Foča but moved to Dubrovnik as a child, where he started swimming in 1968, and joined VK Jug in 1974. He spent most of his career in Jug, winning with them five Yugoslav league titles, two Yugoslav cup titles, and the LEN Champions League in 1981.

Playing for the Yugoslavia national team, Đuho won the gold medal at the 1984 Olympics in Los Angeles and at the 1988 Olympics in Seoul, as well as the gold medal at the 1986 World Championship in Madrid, the gold medal at the 1987 World Cup, and silver medals at the 1985 European Championship in Sofia and the 1987 European Championship in Strasbourg. Later in his career he also played in Italy for Rari Nantes Salerno and Rari Nantes Cagliari, before retiring in 1993 to become Cagliari's coach.

He served as the head coach of Jug between 1997 and 2003, during which time the club won the 2000 LEN Cup, 2000–01 LEN Champions League, Croatian First League in 2000 and 2001, and Croatian Cup in 2001 and 2003. Đuho was then the head coach of VK Koper before become the head coach of Jug again in 2012. In March 2014, Đuho was relieved of his coaching duties in Jug, and was replaced by Miho Bobić.

== See also ==
- Yugoslavia men's Olympic water polo team records and statistics
- List of Olympic champions in men's water polo
- List of Olympic medalists in water polo (men)
- List of world champions in men's water polo
- List of World Aquatics Championships medalists in water polo
