= Miroslav Poljak =

Croatian water polo player

Personal information
- Born: 3 September 1944 Zagreb, Yugoslavia
- Died: 2 November 2015 (aged 71)
- Height: 185 cm (6 ft 1 in)
- Weight: 95 kg (209 lb)

Sport
- Sport: Water polo
Medal record
Representing Yugoslavia
Olympic Games
Gold medal – first place	1968 Mexico City	Team competition

Miroslav Poljak (Мирослав Пољак, 3 September 1944 – 2 November 2015) was a Croatian water polo player notable for winning a gold medal in Mexico City in 1968, with the Yugoslavian water polo team.

== See also ==
- Yugoslavia men's Olympic water polo team records and statistics
- List of Olympic champions in men's water polo
- List of Olympic medalists in water polo (men)
