= Goran Sukno =

Croatian water polo player (1959–2026)

Personal information
- Born: 6 April 1959 Dubrovnik, PR Croatia, FPR Yugoslavia
- Died: 15 February 2026 (aged 66) Dubrovnik, Croatia
Medal record
Men's water polo
Representing Yugoslavia
Olympic Games
Gold medal – first place	1984 Los Angeles	Team competition
World Championships
Gold medal – first place	1986 Madrid	Team competition
European Championships
Silver medal – second place	1985 Sofia	Team competition

Goran Sukno (6 April 1959 – 15 February 2026) was a Croatian water polo player. He was an Olympic gold medal winner as a member of the Yugoslav water polo team at the 1984 Summer Olympics.

Sukno died in Dubrovnik on 15 February 2026, at the age of 66 due to an ongoing illness.

His son Sandro Sukno (born 1990) is an international water polo player for Croatia.

== See also ==
- Yugoslavia men's Olympic water polo team records and statistics
- List of Olympic champions in men's water polo
- List of Olympic medalists in water polo (men)
- List of world champions in men's water polo
- List of World Aquatics Championships medalists in water polo
