= Miloš Marković (water polo) =

Serbian water polo player

Miloš Markovic
Personal information
- Nationality: Yugoslavia; Serbia
- Born: 27 January 1947
- Died: 25 February 2010 (aged 63) Belgrade, Serbia
- Height: 1.82 m (6 ft 0 in)
- Weight: 84 kg (185 lb)

Sport
- Sport: Water polo

Senior clubs
- Years: Team
- –: Partizan
National team
- Years: Team
- ?-?: Yugoslavia
Medal record
Representing Yugoslavia
World Championships
Bronze medal – third place	1973 Belgrade	Team competition
European Championships
Bronze medal – third place	1970 Barcelona	Team competition
Bronze medal – third place	1974 Vienna	Team competition

Miloš Markovic (Милош Марковић; 27 January 1947 – 25 February 2010) was a Yugoslavian male water polo player. He was a member of the Yugoslavia men's national water polo team. He competed with the team at the 1972 Summer Olympics and 1976 Summer Olympics.

== See also ==
- Yugoslavia men's Olympic water polo team records and statistics
- List of men's Olympic water polo tournament goalkeepers
- List of World Aquatics Championships medalists in water polo
