= Katica Ileš =

Croatian handball player (born 1946)

Olympic medal record

Women's Handball
Silver medal – second place	1980 Moscow	Team

Katica Ileš (born 30 March 1946 in Osijek) is a former Yugoslav/Croatian handball player of Hungarian who competed in the 1980 Summer Olympics.

In 1980 she won the silver medal with the Yugoslav team. She played all five matches and scored nine goals.
