= Dejan Dabović =

Yugoslav water polo player (1944–2020)

Personal information
- Born: 3 August 1944 Herceg Novi, Independent State of Croatia
- Died: 6 December 2020 (aged 76) Belgrade, Serbia
- Height: 1.90 cm (1 in)
- Weight: 95 kg (209 lb)
Medal record
Men's water polo
Representing Yugoslavia
Olympic Games
Gold medal – first place	1968 Mexico City	Team competition

Dejan Dabović (Дејан Дабовић, 3 August 1944 – 6 December 2020) was a Yugoslav water polo player notable for winning a gold medal in Mexico City in 1968, with the Yugoslavian water polo team.

Dabović was born in Herceg Novi and died from COVID-19 in Belgrade, at age 76 during the COVID-19 pandemic in Serbia.

== See also ==
- Yugoslavia men's Olympic water polo team records and statistics
- List of Olympic champions in men's water polo
- List of Olympic medalists in water polo (men)
