= Zoran Roje =

Croatian water polo player

Personal information
- Born: 7 October 1955 (age 71) Split, FPR Yugoslavia
- Height: 1.93 m (6 ft 4 in)
- Weight: 93 kg (205 lb)

Sport
- Sport: Water polo

Senior clubs
- Years: Team
- ? ?: VK Primorje; CC Napoli
National team
Years	Team	Apps	(Gls)
?	Yugoslavia	241	(?)

Teams coached
- ? 2003–2005: VK Primorje; Croatia
Medal record
Men's water polo
Representing Yugoslavia
Olympic Games
Gold medal – first place	1984 Los Angeles	Team competition
Silver medal – second place	1980 Moscow	Team competition
Mediterranean Games
Gold medal – first place	1979 Split	Team competition
Gold medal – first place	1983 Casablanca	Team competition
Head Coach for Croatia
European Championship
Silver medal – second place	2003 Kranj

Zoran Roje (born 7 October 1955) is a Croatian former professional water polo player and coach. As a member of the Yugoslavia national team, he won the gold medal at the 1984 Summer Olympics and the silver medal at the 1980 Summer Olympics. Born in Split, he has led the Croatia national team to the silver medal at the 2003 European Championship held in Kranj.

== See also ==
- Yugoslavia men's Olympic water polo team records and statistics
- List of Olympic champions in men's water polo
- List of Olympic medalists in water polo (men)
- List of World Aquatics Championships medalists in water polo
