= Zdravko Hebel =

Croatian water polo player (1943–2017)

Personal information
- Born: 21 January 1943 Zagreb, Yugoslavia
- Died: 12 August 2017 (aged 74) Zagreb, Croatia
- Height: 187 cm (6 ft 2 in)
- Weight: 87 kg (192 lb)

Sport
- Sport: Water polo
Medal record
Representing Yugoslavia
Olympic Games
Gold medal – first place	1968 Mexico City	Team competition
Mediterranean Games
Gold medal – first place	1971 Tunis	Team competition

Zdravko Hebel (21 January 1943 – 12 August 2017) was a Croatian water polo player notable for winning a gold medal with the Yugoslavian water polo team at the 1968 Summer Olympics in Mexico City.

Hebel served as the president of the Croatian Olympic Committee from 2000 to 2002.

== See also ==
- Yugoslavia men's Olympic water polo team records and statistics
- List of Olympic champions in men's water polo
- List of Olympic medalists in water polo (men)
- List of men's Olympic water polo tournament goalkeepers

Sporting positions
Preceded by Antun Vrdoljak	President of the Croatian Olympic Committee; 2000–2002	Succeeded by Zlatko Mateša
