= Đorđe Perišić =

Montenegrin water polo player

Personal information
- Native name: Ђорђе Перишић
- Born: 6 May 1941 (age 85) Kotor, Italian-annexed Montenegro
Medal record
Men's water polo
Representing Yugoslavia
Olympic Games
Gold medal – first place	1968 Mexico City	Team competition
World Championships
Bronze medal – third place	1973 Belgrade	Team competition

Đorđe Perišić (Serbian Cyrillic: Ђорђе Перишић; born 6 May 1941) is a Montenegrin water polo player notable for winning a gold medal in Mexico City in 1968, with the Yugoslavian water polo team.

== See also ==
- Yugoslavia men's Olympic water polo team records and statistics
- List of Olympic champions in men's water polo
- List of Olympic medalists in water polo (men)
- List of World Aquatics Championships medalists in water polo
