= Zoran Janković (water polo) =

Yugoslav water polo player (1940–2002)

Zoran Jankovic
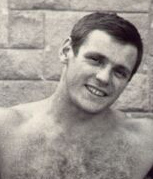

Personal information
- Born: 8 January 1940 Zenica, Drina Banovina, Kingdom of Yugoslavia
- Died: 25 May 2002 (aged 62) Belgrade, FR Yugoslavia
- Height: 178 cm (5 ft 10 in)
- Weight: 95 kg (209 lb)

Sport
- Sport: Water polo
- Club: Partizan Belgrade
Medal record
Representing Yugoslavia
Olympic Games
Silver medal – second place	1964 Tokyo	Team competition
Gold medal – first place	1968 Mexico City	Team competition

Zoran Janković (8 January 1940 in Zenica, Kingdom of Yugoslavia – 25 May 2002 in Belgrade, FR Yugoslavia) was a Yugoslav water polo player notable for winning a silver medal at the 1964 Summer Olympics in Tokyo, and a gold medal in Mexico City in 1968, with the Yugoslavian men's water polo team.

In his career, he played for the Mladost from Zagreb and Partizan from Belgrade.He also played one season as coach/player for Red Star Belgrade in the late 70s.

== See also ==
- Yugoslavia men's Olympic water polo team records and statistics
- List of Olympic champions in men's water polo
- List of Olympic medalists in water polo (men)
- List of men's Olympic water polo tournament top goalscorers
- List of World Aquatics Championships medalists in water polo
- List of members of the International Swimming Hall of Fame
