= Mirko Sandić =

Serbian water polo player

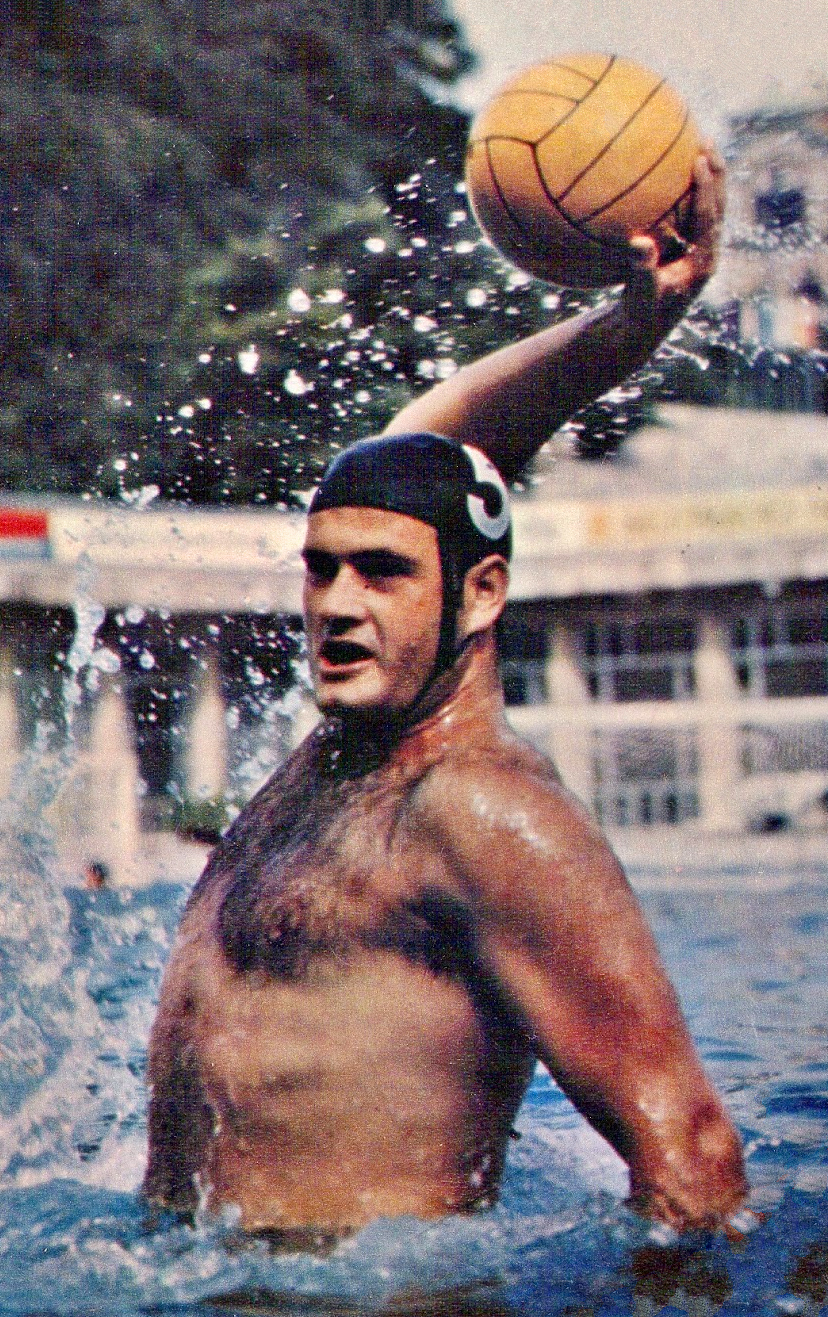

Personal information
- Born: 9 May 1942 Belgrade, German-occupied Serbia
- Died: 24 December 2006 (aged 64) Belgrade, Serbia
- Height: 198 cm (6 ft 6 in)
- Weight: 100 kg (220 lb)

Sport
- Sport: Water polo
- Club: Partizan Belgrade
Medal record
Representing Yugoslavia
Olympic Games
Silver medal – second place	1964 Tokyo	Team competition
Gold medal – first place	1968 Mexico City	Team competition
European Water Polo Championship
Bronze medal – third place	1966 Utrecht	Team
Bronze medal – third place	1970 Barcelona	Team
Mediterranean Games
Silver medal – second place	1963 Naples	Team
Gold medal – first place	1967 Tunis	Team
Gold medal – first place	1971 Izmir	Team
Summer Universiade
Gold medal – first place	1961 Sofia	Team competition

Mirko Sandić (Serbian Cyrillic: Мирко Сандић; 9 May 1942 – 24 December 2006) was a Serbian water polo player who led Yugoslav teams to a gold medal at the 1968 Summer Olympics and a silver medal at the 1964 Summer Olympics. He also competed in the 1960 and 1972 Olympics where his teams placed fourth and fifth, respectively. He was given the honour to carry the national flag of Yugoslavia at the opening ceremony of the 1972 Summer Olympics in Munich, becoming the twelfth water polo player to be a flag bearer at the opening and closing ceremonies of the Olympics. Between 1958 and 1974 Sandić played more than 235 matches for the Yugoslav national team contributing 250 goals.

According to his friend and FINA President Ante Lambasa, Sandic learned to swim and started playing water polo at an early age in Makarska, the birth town of his mother where he spent his summers. However, it was not until age 16 that he began playing water polo for club Partizan, a member of the second division of the Yugoslav Water Polo League. As a member of this club Sandić played more than 1000 games and won 11 Yugoslav National Championships, 7 Yugoslav Cups and 5 European Cups, in 1964, 1966, 1967, 1971 and 1975.

Sandić had a degree in foreign affairs. After retiring from competitions he coached national water polo teams in Singapore (1975–1980), Malaysia (1976) and Egypt (1983–1987), while serving as a commercial manager for Jat Airways in those countries. He also worked with the state teams of New South Wales (1977) and Queensland (1978) in Australia and with the Yugoslav clubs GOC (1980–1982) and Partizan (1980–1983). In 1971 he was voted as the Yugoslav Sportsman of the Year, in 1972 received the Presidential Medal of Honor from Josip Broz Tito, and in 1997 an award from the International Olympic Committee for contribution to the Olympic movement. In 1987 he became a member of the Yugoslav National Olympic Committee, and from 1996 to 2003 served as the first president of the Serbian Water Polo Federation. In 1999, he was inducted into the International Swimming Hall of Fame.

== See also ==
- Yugoslavia men's Olympic water polo team records and statistics
- List of Olympic champions in men's water polo
- List of Olympic medalists in water polo (men)
- List of players who have appeared in multiple men's Olympic water polo tournaments
- List of men's Olympic water polo tournament top goalscorers
- List of flag bearers for Yugoslavia at the Olympics
- List of members of the International Swimming Hall of Fame

Olympic Games
Preceded by Branislav Simić	Flagbearer for Yugoslavia; Munich 1972	Succeeded by Hrvoje Horvat
