= Karlo Stipanić =

Croatian water polo player

Personal information
- Born: 8 December 1941 (age 84) Crikvenica, Independent State of Croatia
Medal record
Men's water polo
Representing Yugoslavia
Olympic Games
Gold medal – first place	1968 Mexico City	Team competition
Silver medal – second place	1964 Tokyo	Team Competition

Karlo Stipanić (born 8 December 1941) is a former Croatian water polo player, most notable for winning a silver medal at the 1964 Summer Olympics in Tokyo, and a gold medal in Mexico City in 1968, with the Yugoslavian water polo team.

== See also ==
- Yugoslavia men's Olympic water polo team records and statistics
- List of Olympic champions in men's water polo
- List of Olympic medalists in water polo (men)
- List of men's Olympic water polo tournament goalkeepers
