= Uroš Marović =

Serbian water polo player

Personal information
- Born: 4 July 1946 Belgrade, Yugoslavia
- Died: 23 January 2014 (aged 67)

Sport
- Sport: Water polo
Medal record
Representing Yugoslavia
Olympic Games
Gold medal – first place	1968 Mexico City	Team competition

Uroš Marović (4 July 1946 – 23 January 2014) was a Serbian water polo player notable for winning a gold medal in Mexico City in 1968, with the Yugoslavian water polo team.

== See also ==
- Yugoslavia men's Olympic water polo team records and statistics
- List of Olympic champions in men's water polo
- List of Olympic medalists in water polo (men)
- List of men's Olympic water polo tournament top goalscorers
