= Ozren Bonačić =

Croatian water polo player

Personal information
- Born: 5 January 1942 (age 84) Zagreb, Independent State of Croatia
- Height: 1.96 m (6 ft 5 in)
- Weight: 110 kg (243 lb)
Medal record
Men's water polo
Representing Yugoslavia
Olympic Games
Gold medal – first place	1968 Mexico City	Team competition
Silver medal – second place	1964 Tokyo	Team competition
World Championships
Bronze medal – third place	1973 Belgrade	Team competition
European Championships
Bronze medal – third place	1966 Utrecht	Team competition
Bronze medal – third place	1970 Barcelona	Team competition
Bronze medal – third place	1974 Vienna	Team competition

Ozren Bonačić (born 5 January 1942) is a former Croatian water polo player and Olympic medalist with the Yugoslavia men's national water polo team.

During his club career he played for HAVK Mladost, with which he won four European championship titles. Since 1978 he has been a water polo coach, and he also coached Mladost for many seasons, winning the European championship in 1996. He was most recently the coach of Mladost in the 2008/09 season.

== See also ==
- Yugoslavia men's Olympic water polo team records and statistics
- List of Olympic champions in men's water polo
- List of Olympic medalists in water polo (men)
- List of players who have appeared in multiple men's Olympic water polo tournaments
- List of World Aquatics Championships medalists in water polo
