= Ronald Lopatny =

Croatian water polo player (1944–2022)

Personal information
- Born: 19 September 1944 Zagreb, Yugoslavia
- Died: 5 May 2022 (aged 77)
- Height: 188 cm (6 ft 2 in)
- Weight: 91 kg (201 lb)

Sport
- Sport: Water polo
Medal record
Representing Yugoslavia
Olympic Games
Gold medal – first place	1968 Mexico City	Team competition

Ronald Lopatny (also spelled Lopatni; 19 September 1944 – 5 May 2022) was a Croatian professional water polo player notable for winning a gold medal in Mexico City in 1968, with the Yugoslavian water polo team.

== See also ==
- Yugoslavia men's Olympic water polo team records and statistics
- List of Olympic champions in men's water polo
- List of Olympic medalists in water polo (men)
