= Ivo Trumbić =

Croatian water polo player (1935–2021)

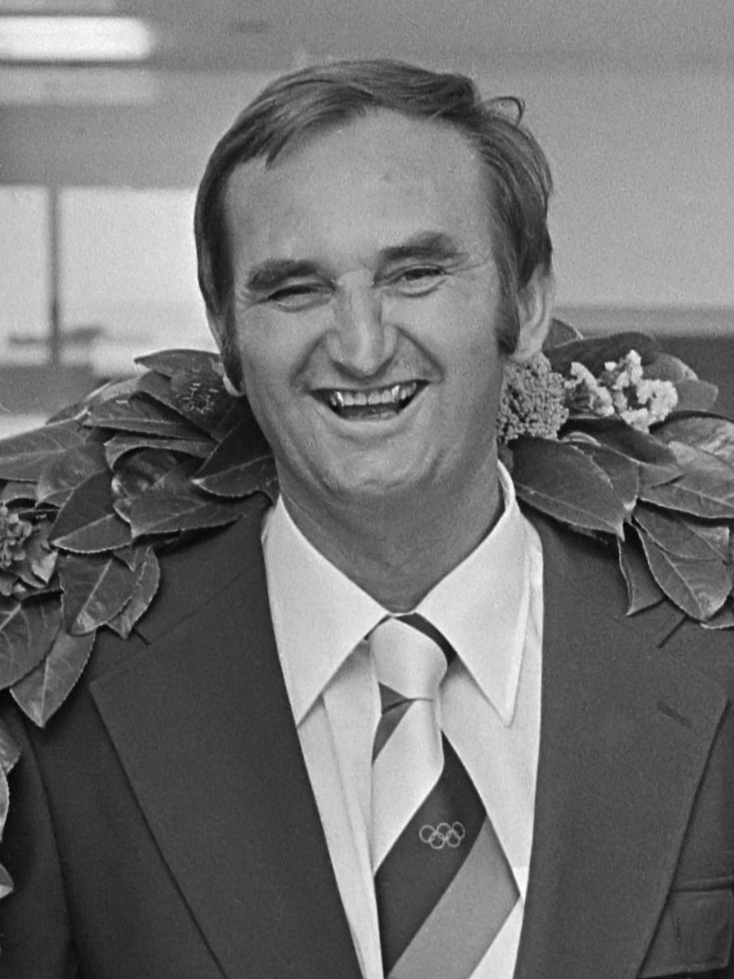
- Trumbić in July 1976 at the Olympics in Montreal while coaching the Netherlands national team.

Personal information
- Born: 2 April 1935 Split, Littoral Banovina, Yugoslavia
- Died: 12 March 2021 (aged 85) Zagreb, Croatia
- Height: 1.97 m (6 ft 6 in)
- Weight: 103 kg (227 lb)
Medal record
Men's water polo
Representing Yugoslavia
Olympic Games
Gold medal – first place	1968 Mexico City	Team competition
Silver medal – second place	1964 Tokyo	Team competition

Ivo Trumbić (2 April 1935 – 12 March 2021) was a Croatian water polo player and Olympic medallist. He later went on to manage. Ivo Trumbić coached the Netherlands to a bronze medal at the 1976 Summer Olympics, becoming one of the few sportspeople who won Olympic medals in water polo as players and head coaches.

== Career ==
According to the Netherlands men's national water polo team, Trumbic was not only national coach of Orange in two periods, but he also worked as a coach and technical director for a long time at AC&PC from Amersfoort. The Croat, who conquered Olympic silver (1964) and gold (1968) as a water polo player with the former Yugoslavia.

Trumbic was inducted into the Swimming World's International Hall of Fame in 2015. The Royal Dutch Swimming Federation appointed him a member of merit in 2018, and in 2020 he received the Franjo Bučar Lifetime Achievement Award, Croatia's most important sports prize.

Ivo Trumbic died on 12 March 2021 at the age of 85.

== See also ==
- Yugoslavia men's Olympic water polo team records and statistics
- Netherlands men's Olympic water polo team records and statistics
- List of Olympic champions in men's water polo
- List of Olympic medalists in water polo (men)
- List of members of the International Swimming Hall of Fame
