= Lazarev =

Lazarev (masculine) or Lazareva (feminine) may refer to:

== Places ==
- Lazarev (urban-type settlement), an urban-type settlement in Khabarovsk Krai, Russia
- Lazarev Bay in Antarctica
- Lazarev Ice Shelf in Antarctica
- Lazarev Mountains
- Lazarev Sea in Antarctica
- Lazarev Trough in Antarctica
- Cape Lazarev in Crimea
- Lazarev atoll in Tuamotu Islands
- Lazarev Island in the South Georgia Archipelago
- Lazareva Island in the Aral Sea.
- Lazareva Pećina, a cave in Serbia
- Wonsan, a city in North Korea formerly known as Port Lazarev

== Ships ==
- Russian battlecruiser Admiral Lazarev
- Admiral Lazarev-class monitor
- Admiral Lazarev, a former name of the Krasny Kavkaz cruiser

== Others ==
- Lazarev (surname) (Lazareva)
- Lazarev Institute of Oriental Languages in Moscow, Russia
- Port Lazarev

== See also ==
- Lazareff (disambiguation)
- Lazareva Subota, Orthodox tradition
- Lazarevski, surname
- Lazarevsky, several inhabited localities in Russia
