= Llazar =

- Gender: Male

Origin
- Region of origin: Albania, Kosovo

Other names
- Related names: Lazar

Llazar is an Albanian masculine given name and may refer to:

- Llazar Bozo (1882–1956), Albanian activist, freedom-fighter, commander, benefactor and delegate
- Llazar Fundo (1899–1944), Albanian communist, social-democrat, journalist and writer
- Lazër Mjeda (1869–1935), Albanian prelate of the Roman Catholic Church
- Llazar Siliqi (1924–2001), Albanian poet
- Llazar Treska, 20th century Albanian politician and mayor of Tirana
