= List of Croatian sportspeople =

This is a partial list of famous Croatian sportspeople.

== Individual sports ==
=== Alpine skiing ===
- Nika Fleiss - Alpine skier,
- Ana Jelušić - Alpine skier,
- Janica Kostelić - Alpine Skier World Cup Champion in 2001, 2003 and 2006 - (Four Olympic Gold and Two Silver Medals)
- Ivica Kostelić - Alpine skier, Olympic Silver Medalist in 2006 and 2010.
- Danko Marinelli - Alpine skier,
- Sofija Novoselić - Alpine skier,
- Ivan Ratkić - Alpine skier,
- Dalibor Šamšal - Alpine skier,
- Antony Sumich
- Filip Zubčić - Alpine skier,

=== Boxing ===
- Stjepan Božić - WBF Super Middleweight Champion
- George Chuvalo - Fmr. Canadian Heavyweight Champion
- Stipe Drviš - World Light Heavyweight Boxing Champion
- Željko Mavrović - Fmr. European Boxing Champion
- Bob Mirović - 8 Times Australian Heavyweight Champion
- Mate Parlov - Fmr. WBC and European Light Heavyweight Champion
- Diana Prazak - professional female boxer from Australia
- Mario Preskar
- Damir Škaro - Olympic silver medal 1988
- Fritzie Živić (The Croat Comet) - Fmr. World Welterweight Champion

=== Discus throw ===
- Sandra Perković - Olympic Gold Medal 2012

=== Kayaking ===
- Matija Ljubek

=== Kickboxing ===
- Mladen Brestovac - K1 Kickboxer and FFC Heavyweight Champion
- Branko Cikatić - First K-1 Grand Prix Winner
- Igor Jurković - K1 kickboxer
- Stefan Leko - Croatian heritage. German K1 Kickboxer
- Marko Tomasović
- Ivan Stanić

=== Martial arts ===
- Sandra Šarić - Olympic Bronze Medal 2008
- Lucija Zaninović - Olympic Bronze Medal 2012
- Martina Zubčić - Olympic Bronze Medal 2008

=== MMA ===
- Mirko Filipović (Cro Cop) - Mixed Martial Artist And Kickboxer, PRIDE FC 2006 Open-Weight Grand Prix Champion and last K-1 World Grand Prix Champion
- Zelg Galešić - Mixed Martial Artist
- Pat Miletich (The Croatian Sensation) - Former UFC Champion
- Stipe Miočić - Current UFC Heavyweight Champion
- Igor Pokrajac - UFC Mixed Martial Artist
- Goran Reljić - UFC Mixed Martial Artist

=== Motorsport ===
- Robbie Frančević - NZ Touring car race driver
- Gary Gabelich - American automobile-racing driver
- Paul Radisich - NZ Racing car driver (Son of Frank Radisich)
- Auggie Vidovich – NASCAR Driver

=== Running ===
- Branko Zorko

=== Rowing ===
- Luka Grubor - UK Olympic Gold Medalist (Rowing)
- Damir Martin - Olympic Silver Medalist in 2012 and 2016
- Valent Sinković - Olympic Gold Medalist in 2016, Olympic Silver Medalist in 2012
- Martin Sinković - Olympic Gold Medalist in 2016, Olympic Silver Medalist in 2012

=== Sailing ===
- Petar Cupać
- Šime Fantela
- Ivan Kljaković Gašpić
- Pavle Kostov
- Igor Marenić
- Tina Mihelić
- Luka Mratović
- Enia Ninčević
- Tonči Stipanović
- Romana Župan

=== Shooting ===
- Giovanni Cernogoraz - Olympic Gold Medal 2012
- Bojan Đurković
- Anton Glasnović
- Petar Gorša
- Snježana Pejčić

=== Swimming ===
- Đurđica Bjedov
- Duje Draganja
- Sanja Jovanović
- Mirna Jukić
- Tomislav Karlo
- Gordan Kožulj
- Miloš Milošević
- Kim Daniela Pavlin
- Marko Strahija
- Mario Todorović

=== Table tennis ===
- Tamara Boroš
- Zoran Primorac
- Antun Stipančić
- Dragutin Šurbek
- Tian Yuan

=== Tennis ===
- Mario Ančić
- Marin Čilić
- Borna Ćorić
- Ivan Dodig
- Željko Franulović
- Sabrina Goleš
- Saša Hiršzon
- Goran Ivanišević
- Boro Jovanović
- Ivo Karlović
- Ivan Ljubičić
- Mirjana Lučić
- Iva Majoli
- Petra Martić
- Josip Palada
- Nikola Pilić
- Goran Prpić
- Franjo Punčec
- Jelena Kostanić Tošić
- Antonio Veić
- Donna Vekić

=== Triathlon ===
- Dejan Patrčević

=== Wrestling ===
- Victor Jovica
- Josip Peruzović
- Jerry Sags
- Stan Stasiak
- Shawn Stasiak
- Hugo Savinovich
- Nenad Žugaj - Bronze at World Championships 2011
- Neven Žugaj - Bronze at World Championships 2010

== Team sports ==
=== Football ===
1998 FIFA World Cup bronze medalists

- Aljoša Asanović
- Slaven Bilić
- Miroslav Blažević - Head coach
- Zvonimir Boban
- Alen Bokšić
- Robert Jarni
- Goran Jurić
- Krunoslav Jurčić
- Ardian Kozniku
- Petar Krpan
- Dražen Ladić
- Zoran Mamić
- Silvio Marić
- Marijan Mrmić
- Robert Prosinečki
- Mario Stanić
- Anthony Šerić
- Dario Šimić
- Davor Šuker - 1998 Golden Boot Winner
- Igor Štimac
- Igor Tudor
- Vladimir Vasilj
- Goran Vlaović

Current players

- Milan Badelj
- Borna Barišić
- Karlo Bartolec
- Filip Bradarić
- Josip Brekalo
- Marcelo Brozović
- Duje Ćaleta-Car
- Duje Čop
- Vedran Ćorluka
- Tin Jedvaj
- Lovre Kalinić
- Nikola Kalinić
- Mateo Kovačić
- Andrej Kramarić
- Marin Leovac
- Karlo Letica
- Marko Livaja
- Dominik Livaković
- Dejan Lovren
- Matej Mitrović
- Antonio Milić
- Luka Modrić
- Zoran Nižić
- Mario Pašalić
- Ivan Perišić
- Josip Pivarić
- Marko Pjaca
- Christian Pulisic - American footballer of Croat descent
- Ivan Rakitić
- Ante Rebić
- Marko Rog
- Ivan Santini
- Simon Sluga
- Borna Sosa
- Ivan Strinić
- Danijel Subašić
- Domagoj Vida
- Nikola Vlašić
- Šime Vrsaljko

Former players

- Srđan Andrić
- Marko Babić
- Boško Balaban
- Bruno Belin
- Rudolf Belin
- Nenad Bjelica
- Stjepan Bobek
- Ivan Bošnjak
- Miroslav Brozović
- Igor Budan
- Josip Bukal
- Ivan Buljan
- Tomislav Butina
- Zlatko Čajkovski
- Tomislav Crnković
- Hrvoje Ćustić
- Stjepan Deverić
- Joey Didulica
- Tomislav Dujmović
- Mario Galinović
- Franjo Glazer
- Ivan Gudelj
- Ivan Hitrec
- Ivan Horvat
- Tomislav Ivković
- Dražan Jerković - Golden Boot Winner at the EURO 1960 and World Cup 1962.
- Jurica Jerković
- Davor Jozić
- Dario Knežević
- Mirko Kokotović
- Niko Kovač
- Robert Kovač
- Ivica Križanac
- Gustav Lehner
- Ivan Leko
- Jerko Leko
- Mario Mandžukić
- Vlatko Marković
- Frane Matošić
- Marko Mlinarić
- Ivica Mornar
- Miljenko Mumlek
- Dražen Mužinić
- Mato Neretljak
- Željko Perušić
- Luka Peruzović
- Nikola Pokrivač
- Danijel Pranjić
- Danijel Premerl
- Dado Pršo
- Petar Radaković
- Milan Rapaić
- Đovani Roso
- Vedran Runje
- Zlatko Runje
- Darijo Srna
- Daniel Šarić
- Mateo Silić
- Dario Šimić
- Josip Skoblar - European Golden Boot, 1971
- Blaž Slišković
- Tomislav Šokota
- Franjo Šoštarić
- Ivica Šurjak
- Mario Tokić
- Stjepan Tomas
- Hrvoje Vejić
- Franjo Vladić
- Jurica Vranješ
- Davor Vugrinec
- Zlatko Vujović
- Zoran Vujović
- Bernard Vukas
- Zoran Vulić
- Velimir Zajec
- Slaven Zambata
- Ante Žanetić
- Branko Zebec
- Aleksandar Živković (footballer, born 1912)
- Boris Živković

=== American football ===
- Bill Belichick - NFL Coach (grandson of Croatian immigrants)
- Brian Belichick - NFL coach (great-grandson of Croatian immigrants)
- Stephen Belichick - NFL coach (great-grandson of Croatian immigrants)
- Steve Belichick - NFL player and coach (son of Croatian immigrants)
- Brian Billick - NFL Coach
- Tony Butkovich – College football player
- Pete Carroll - NFL Coach (Irish father, Croatian mother)
- David Diehl - NFL player
- Greg Dulcich - NFL player
- Eddie Erdelatz – NFL player
- Elvis Grbac - NFL player
- John Jurkovic - NFL player
- Joe Kuharich - NFL Coach
- Les Horvath – NFL player
- John Jurkovic – NFL player
- Tony Mandarich - NFL player
- Vic Markov – NFL player (son of Croatian immigrants)
- Rob Ninkovich – NFL player (grandson of Croatian immigrants)
- Lou Saban – NFL Coach
- Nick Saban - College football coach
- Cole Cubelic - American college football player and radio host
- Frank Sinkwich - NFL player, 1942 winner of the Heisman Trophy (born in Croatia)
- Paul Skansi – American football player
- Nick Skorich – American football player and coach
- Josef Spudich – American football player
- Joe Stydahar – American football player
- Chris Zorich - NFL player (African-American father, Croatian mother)

=== Australian rules football ===
- Adrian Barich - Australian rules footballer and Rugby League player
- Tony Begovich - Australian rules footballer
- Gavin Crosisca - Australian rules footballer
- Alan Didak - Australian rules footballer
- Jon Dorotich - Australian rules footballer
- Marc Dragicevic - Australian rules footballer
- Ray Gabelich - Australian rules footballer
- Darren Gaspar - #1 pick in 1993
- Travis Gaspar - Australian rules footballer
- John Gerovich - Australian rules footballer
- Brent Grgic - Australian rules footballer
- Ilija Grgic - Australian rules footballer
- George Grljusich - Australian rules footballer
- Allen Jakovich - Australian rules footballer
- Glen Jakovich - Australian rules footballer
- Judd Lalich - Australian rules footballer
- Matthew Liptak - Australian rules footballer
- Addam Maric - Australian rules footballer
- Ivan Maric - Australian rules footballer
- Lukas Markovic - Australian rules footballer
- Tony Modra - Australian rules footballer
- Matthew Pavlich - Australian rules footballer
- Val Perovic - Australian rules footballer
- Steven Salopek - Australian rules footballer
- Craig Starcevich - Australian rules footballer
- Nick Suban - Australian rules footballer
- Peter Sumich - Australian rules footballer
- Jacob Surjan - Australian rules footballer
- Andrew Ukovic - Australian rules footballer

=== Baseball ===
- Johnny Babich - Baseball player
- Reid Brignac – Baseball player
- Ann Cindric - Baseball player
- Tom Haller – Baseball player
- Ed Jurak - Baseball player
- Al Jurisich – Baseball player
- Mike Kreevich – Baseball player
- Curt Leskanic – Baseball player
- Johnny Logan – Baseball player
- Mickey Lolich - Baseball player
- Steve Lubratich – Baseball player
- Roger Maris - Baseball Legend
- Catfish Metkovich – Baseball player
- Erv Palica (Pavlicevich) - Baseball player
- Johnny Pesky - Baseball player
- Dan Plesac – Baseball player
- Matt Skrmetta - baseball player
- Paul Spoljaric - Baseball player
- Christian Yelich - baseball player
- Bob Zupcic - baseball player

=== Basketball ===
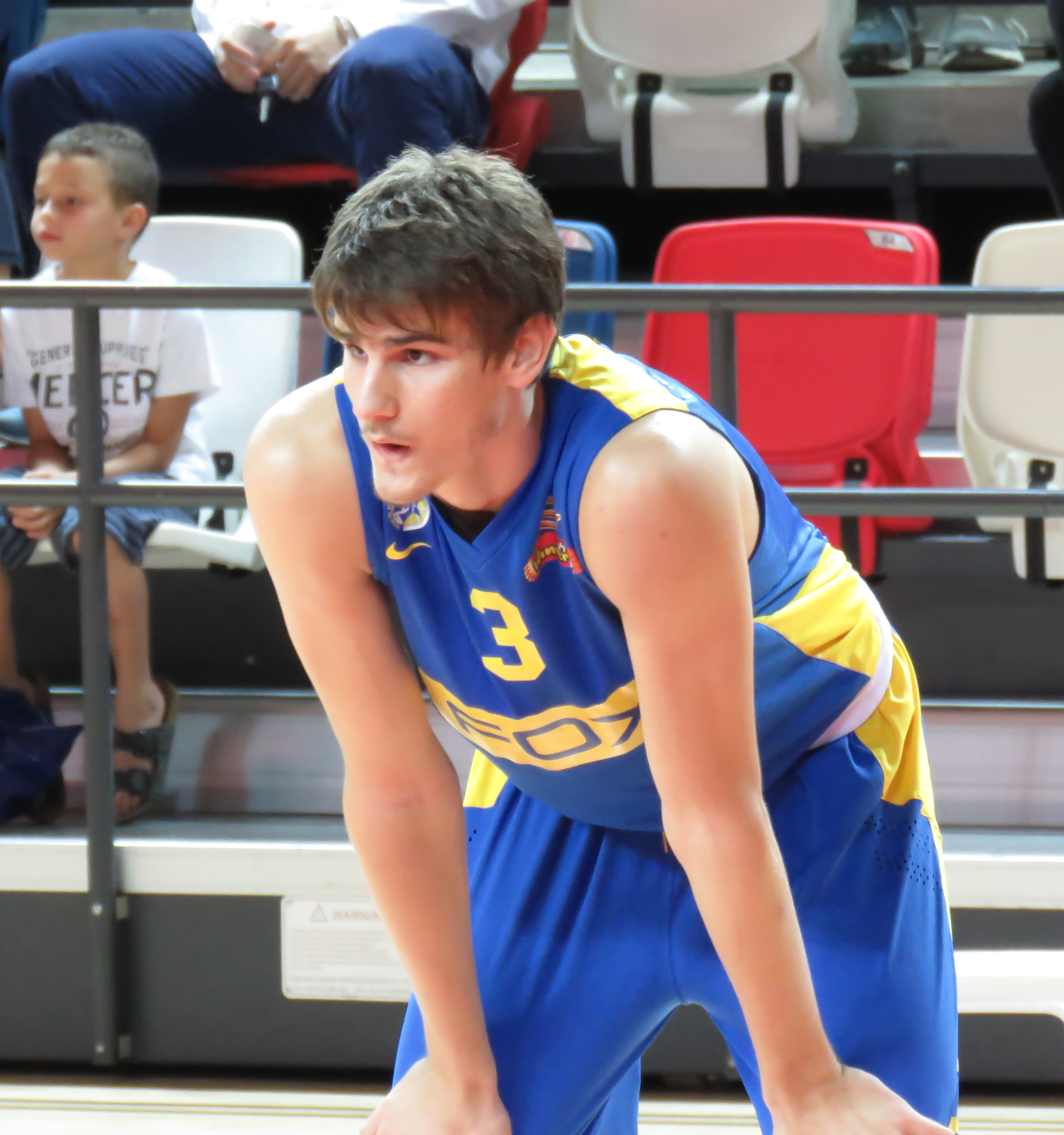
Dragan Bender

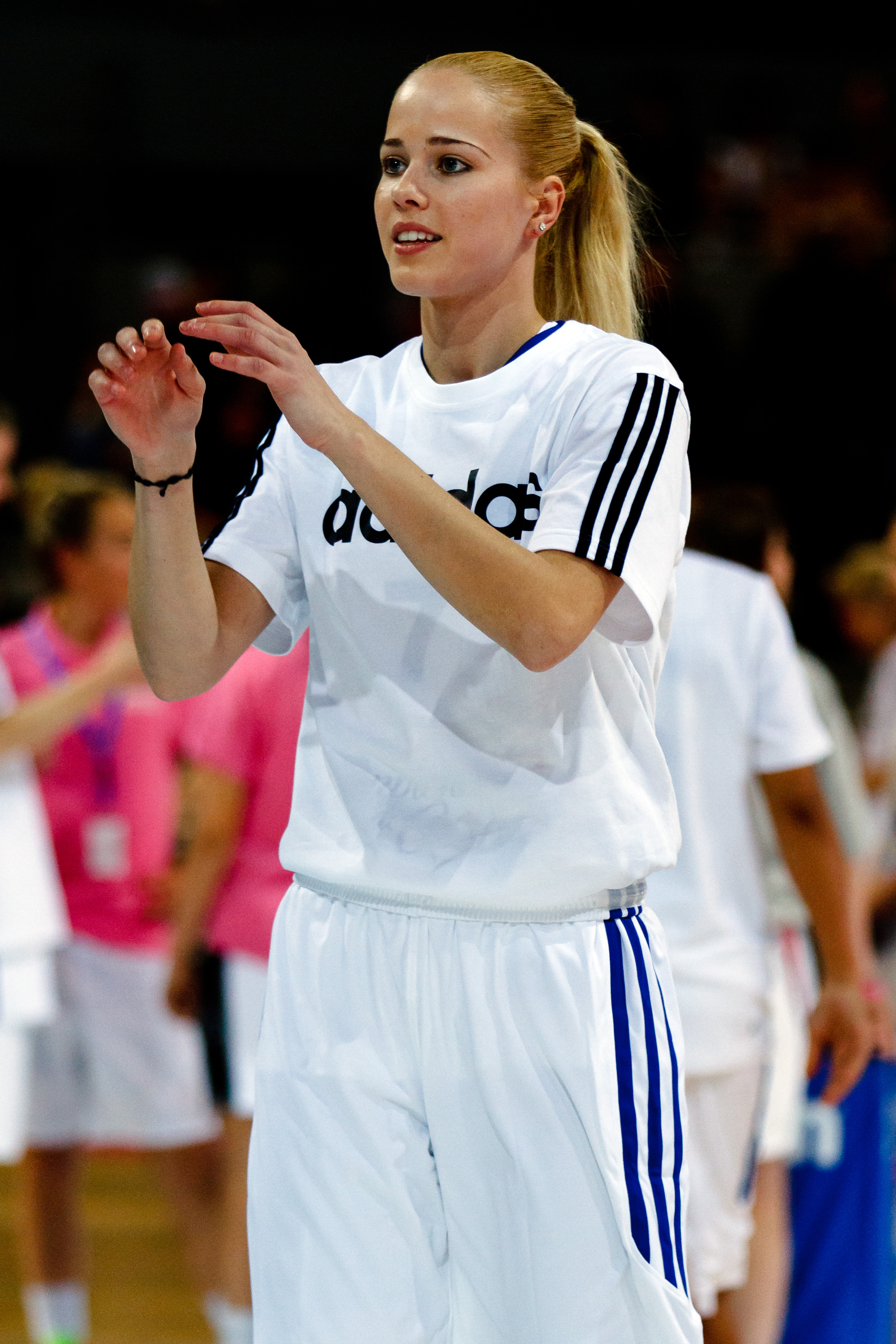
Antonija Mišura

Dario Šarić

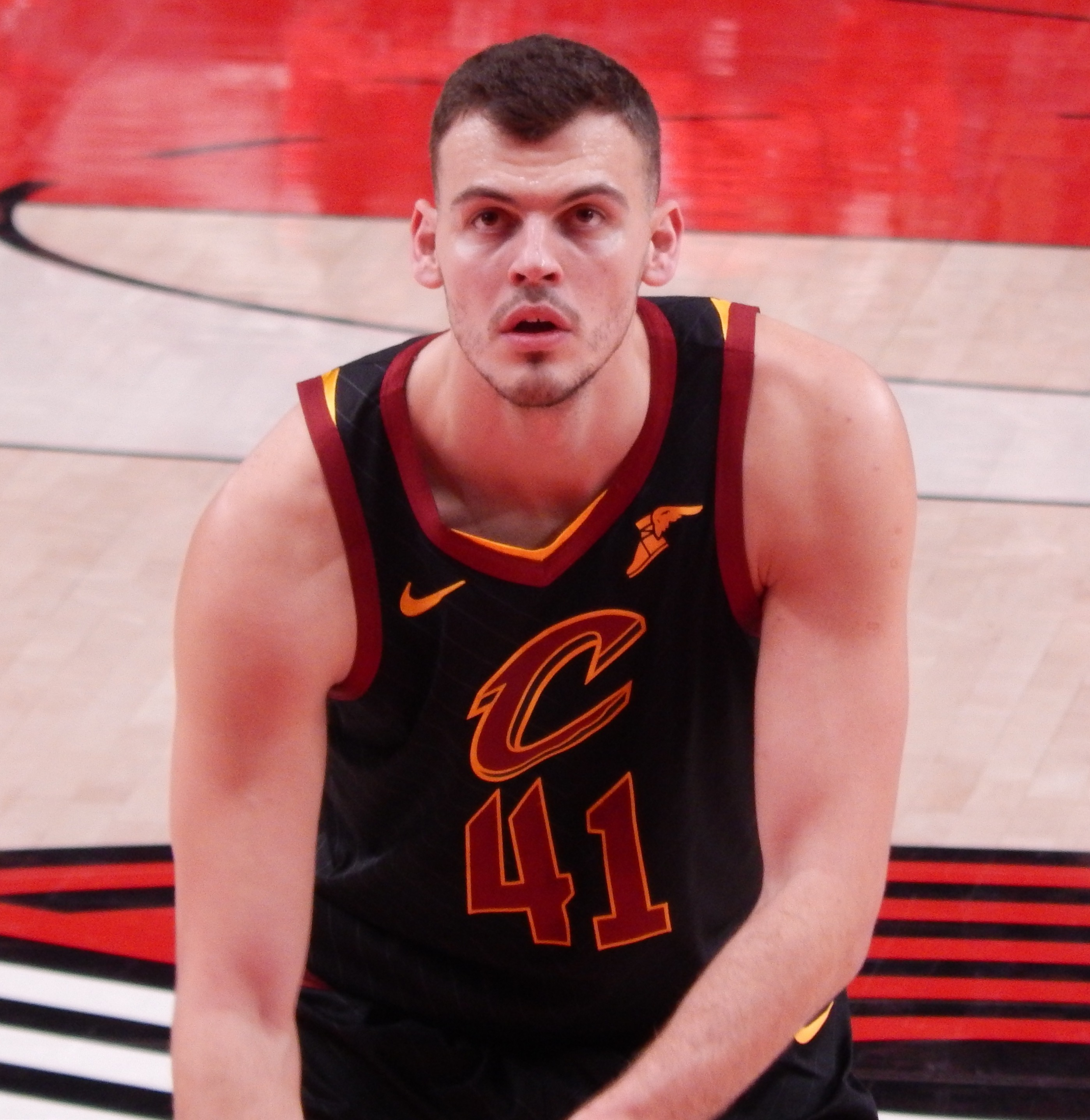
Ante Žižić

- John Abramovic - Fmr. NBA player
- Franjo Arapović - Fmr. NBA Player
- Dalibor Bagarić - Fmr. NBA player
- Dragan Bender (born 1997) - player in the Israeli Basketball Premier League
- Bojan Bogdanović - NBA player
- Andrew Bogut - Australian NBA player, drafted 1st overall in 2005 (both parents Croatian)
- Krešimir Ćosić - NBA Hall of Famer
- Zoran Čutura
- Danko Cvjetičanin
- Ivana Dojkić - WNBA player
- Frank Drmic - Australian basketball player
- Gordan Giriček - NBA player
- Vinko Jelovac - basketball player
- Mario Kasun - NBA player
- Arijan Komazec
- Toni Kukoč - NBA player (NBA Sixth Man of the Year, 1995–1996 season)
- Jack Marin - Fmr. American NBA Star
- Kevin McHale - NBA Hall of Famer (Croatian mother)
- George Mikan - NBA Hall of Famer
- Antonija Mišura
- Nika Mühl - WNBA player
- Dražen Petrović - NBA Hall of Famer
- Zoran Planinić - NBA player
- Gregg Popovich - American Basketball Coach
- Dino Rađa - Fmr. NBA player
- Dario Šarić (Super Dario) – NBA Player with the Phoenix Suns
- Petar Skansi
- Branko Skroče
- Damir Šolman
- Ivan Sunara
- Bruno Šundov - Fmr. NBA player
- Josip Gjergja
- Nikola Plećaš
- Vinko Jelovac
- Željko Jerkov
- Andro Knego
- Duje Krstulović
- Mihovil Nakić
- Mirko Novosel
- Velimir Perasović
- Aleksandar "Aco" Petrović
- Marianna Raguž
- Žan Tabak - Fmr. NBA player
- Igor Miličić
- Igor Miličić Jr.
- Rudy Tomjanovich - Fmr. NBA player and coach, No.2 pick in 1970 NBA draft
- Andy Tonkovich - 1948 first NBA pick
- Ratomir Tvrdić
- Roko Ukic - Current NBA player, No. 41 pick in 2005 NBA draft
- Andrew Vlahov - Fmr. Australian NBA player
- Stojan Vranković - Fmr. NBA player
- Nikola Vujčić (born 1978) - basketball player and team manager of Maccabi Tel Aviv
- Ante Žižić (born 1997) - basketball player in the Israeli Basketball Premier League

=== Cricketers ===
- Anton Devcich - NZ cricket player
- Simon Katich - Australian cricket player
- Antony Sumich - NZ cricket player - player for Croatia
- Joseph Yovich - NZ cricket player

=== Handball ===
- Tomislav Farkaš
- Ivano Balić
- Mirko Bašić
- Patrik Ćavar
- Lino Červar
- Petra Dičak
- Davor Dominiković
- Mirza Džomba
- Valner Franković
- Slavko Goluža
- Bruno Gudelj
- Hrvoje Horvat - Handball Player
- Boris Jarak
- Vladimir Jelčić
- Božidar Jović
- Pavle Jurina
- Nikša Kaleb
- Nenad Kljaić
- Velimir Kljaić
- Ante Kostelić
- Blaženko Lacković
- Venio Losert
- Valter Matošević
- Petar Metličić
- Zoran Mikulić
- Zdravko Miljak
- Alvaro Načinović
- Željko Nimš
- Goran Perkovac
- Miroslav Pribanić
- Iztok Puc
- Zlatko Saračević
- Zvonimir Serdarušić
- Irfan Smajlagić
- Ivan Snoj
- Vlado Šola
- Denis Špoljarić
- Goran Šprem
- Vladimir Šujster
- Renato Sulić
- Albin Vidović
- Igor Vori
- Drago Vuković
- Zdenko Zorko
- Zdravko Zovko
- Vedran Zrnić

=== Hockey ===
- Joseph Cattarinich – NHL Hall of Famer
- Jonathan Filewich – ice hockey player
- Mark Fistric – ice hockey player
- Travis Hamonic – ice hockey player
- John Hecimovic – ice hockey player
- Tony Hrkac - Fmr. NHL player
- Dan Kordic - Fmr. NHL player
- John Kordic - Fmr. NHL player
- Frank Mahovlich - NHL Hall of Famer (1958 Calder Trophy Winner)
- Peter Mahovlich - Fmr. NHL player, nr. 2 in 1963 NHL Amateur Draft
- John Mayasich - Fmr. hockey player
- Phil Oreskovic – ice hockey player
- Victor Oreskovich – ice hockey player
- Mark Pavelich - Fmr. NHL player (Miracle on Ice)
- Matt Pavelich - first NHL linesman inducted into the Hockey Hall of Fame
- Marty Pavelich - Fmr. NHL player
- Borna Rendulić - NHL player
- Cory Sarich - Fmr. NHL player
- Joe Sakic - fmr. NHL player
- Buzz Schneider - ice hockey player
- Adrien Plavsic - (Serb father, Croat mother) Fmr. NHL player
- Joel Prpic - Hockey player (brief appearance in the NHL)
- Rob Valicevic - NHL player
- Marc-Édouard Vlasic - NHL player
- Alex Vlasic - NHL player
- Bo Horvat - NHL player
- Alan Letang - NHL player
- Macklin Celebrini - NHL player
- Aiden Celebrini - NHL player
- George Pesut - NHL player
- Tony Hrkac - NHL player
- John Mayasich - NHL player

=== Rugby ===
- Anthony Boric - Rugby Union player
- Frano Botica - Rugby Union player
- Ivan Cleary - Rugby League player and coach
- Matthew Cooper - Rugby Union player
- Bronko Djura - Rugby League player
- Sean Fitzpatrick - Rugby Union player
- Ivan Henjak - Rugby League player
- Matt Henjak - Rugby Union player
- Max Krilich - Rugby league player
- Dan Luger - Rugby Union player
- Tony Mestrov - Rugby League player
- James Stosic - NZ Rugby League player
- Antony Sumich - Rugby Union player
- Brendon Winslow - Rugby Union player
- Croatia national rugby union team

=== Volleyball ===
- Elena Chebukina
- Tomislav Čošković
- Barbara Jelić
- Igor Omrčen
- Nataša Osmokrović
- Marcos Milinkovic - Argentine volleyball player
- Maja Poljak
- Alejandro Spajic - Argentine volleyball player

=== Waterpolo ===
- Veljko Bakašun
- Ozren Bonačić - Fmr. water polo player and coach
- Marko Brainović
- Perica Bukić - Water polo player and politician
- Ivo Cipci
- Nikša Dobud - Water polo player
- Tomislav Franjković
- Zdravko Hebel
- Vladimir Ivković
- Zoran Janković (water polo)
- Zdravko Ježić
- Hrvoje Kačić
- Zdravko-Ćiro Kovačić
- Ivo Kurtini
- Ronald Lopatni
- Deni Lušić
- Kristijan Milaković
- Miroslav Poljak
- Lovro Radonjić
- Ivo Štakula
- Karlo Stipanić
- Goran Sukno
- Dubravko Šimenc
- Ivo Trumbić
- Božo Vuletić
- Marijan Žužej

== Other sports ==
- Aida Badić – former artistic gymnast
- Sandra Bezic – figure skater, choreographer and television commentator
- Val Bezic – figure skater
- Fred Couples – Golfer (former World number 1)
- Mirko Filipović – K1, UFC, PRIDE fighter
- Gary Gabelich – American automobile-racing driver
- Sofia Mulanovich - famous Peruvian surfer
- Franjo Mihalic - Marathon athlete
- Frank Nobilo - NZ Golfer
- Abdon Pamich – race walker
- Snježana Pejčić – shooting player
- Sandra Perković – discus thrower
- The Great Antonio - Strongman and Eccentric
- Blanka Vlašić – High jumper

== See also ==
- List of VFL/AFL players by ethnicity
