= Lazar (name) =

- Pronunciation: Serbo-Croatian: [lâzaːr]
- Gender: Male

Origin
- Origin: Hebrew
- Meaning: God has helped
- Region of origin: Eastern Europe

Other names
- Derived: Eleazar
- Related names: Lazarus

Lazar (JPA: לִיעֶזֶר or לָעְזָר, romanized: Lāzār, Russian: Лазарь, romanized: Lazar; Hungarian: Lázár; Romanian: Lazăr;Bulgarian and Macedonian: Лазар, romanized: Lazar; Albanian: Llazar, Lazër) is a male given name or a surname. An abbreviation of the Hebrew name אֶלְעָזָר Eleazar or אֱלִיעֶזֶר Eliezer meaning 'God has helped' which first appeared in Jewish Aramaic (see Lazarus and Eleazar ben Shammua). As a forename, it is more common in Slavic countries. As a surname, however, it is more common in Hungary and Romania.

== People with the given name ==
=== Lazar ===
- Lazar Hrebeljanović (1329–1389), duke of Serbia 1371–1389
- Lazar of Hilandar (fl. 1404), Serbian Orthodox monk and clockbuilder
- Lazar Branković (1421–1458), Lazar's grandson and despot of Serbia 1456–1458
- Lazar Baranovych (1620–1693), Ukrainian Orthodox archbishop
- Lazar I of Armenia, head of Armenian Apostolic Church (1737–1751)
- Lázár Mészáros (1796–1858), Hungarian Minister of War
- Lazar Grünhut (1850–1913), Hungarian rabbi
- Lazăr Șăineanu (1859-1934), Romanian philologist
- Lazăr Edeleanu (1861–1941), Romanian chemist
- Lazar Kujundžić (1880–1905), Serbian guerilla fighter
- Lazar Drljača (1882–1970), Serbian painter
- Louis B. Mayer, born Lazar Meir (1884–1957), Canadian-American film executive, co-founder of MGM
- Lazar Kaganovich (1893–1991), Soviet politician and Stalinist
- Lazar Kogan (1889–1939), Soviet secret police functionary
- Lazar Lyusternik (1899–1981), Soviet mathematician
- Lazar Lagin (1903–1979), Soviet satirist and children's writer
- Lazăr Sfera (1909–1992), Romanian footballer
- Lazar Koliševski (1914–2000), Serbian politician
- Lazar Mojsov (1920-2011), Serbian politician
- Lazar Yazgur (1928–2000), Soviet painter
- Lazar Berman (1930–2005), Soviet classical pianist
- Lazar Tasić (1931-2003), Serbian footballer
- Lazar Radović (born 1937), Serbian footballer
- Lazăr Comănescu (born 1949), Romanian politician
- Lazar Ristovski (born 1952), Serbian actor
- Lázár Szentes (born 1955), Hungarian footballer and coach
- Lazar Vidovic (born 1965), Australian footballer
- Lazar Popović (born 1983), Serbian footballer
- Lazar Hayward (born 1986), American basketball player
- Lazar Filipović (born 1990), Serbian paratriathlete
- Lazar Marković (born 1994), Serbian footballer

=== Llazar ===
- Llazar Fundo (1899–1944), Albanian communist, journalist and writer
- Llazar Siliqi (1924–2001), Albanian poet
- Llazar Treska, Albanian politician and mayor of Tirana

== People with the surname ==
Slovak female form is Lazarová.

- Alexandru Lazar (born 1991), Romanian footballer
- Berel Lazar (born 1964), Chief Rabbi of Russia
- Bob Lazar (born 1959), American conspiracy theorist
- Chris Lazar, Canadian actor
- Costin Lazăr (born 1981), Romanian footballer
- Curtis Lazar (born 1995), Canadian hockey player
- David Lazar (born 1991), Romanian footballer
- Ernie Lazar (1945–2022), American historical researcher
- Florin Lazăr (born 1980), Romanian footballer
- Gheorghe Lazăr (1779–c. 1832), Romanian scholar
- Gracie Lazar (born 1969), American actress
- György Lázár (1924–2014), Prime Minister of Hungary from 1975 to 1987
- Ilie Lazăr (1895–1976), Romanian politician
- Ingmar Lazar (born 1993), French classical pianist
- Irving Paul Lazar ("Swifty"; 1907-1993), American Hollywood agent
- János Lázár (born 1975), Hungarian politician
- Jaryd Lazar (born 1987), better known as Summit1g, American internet video gamer
- John Lazar (1801–1879), Australian theatre manager and mayor
- Katarína Lazarová (1914–1995), Slovak writer and translator
- Lajos Lázár (1885–1936), Hungarian film director
- Lora Lazar, Bulgarian crime writer
- Max Lazar (born 1999), American Major League Baseball player
- Mitchell Lazar, American endocrinologist
- Mihai Lazăr (born 1986), Romanian rugby union player
- Marc Lazar (born 1952), French academic
- Monika Lazar (born 1967), German politician
- Philippe Lazar (1936–2026), French statistician and epidemiologist
- Ralph Lazar (born 1967), artist, illustrator and author
- Samuel Lazar (1838–1883), Australian theatre manager and mayor
- Seth Lazar, Australian philosopher
- Tomaž Lazar (born 1982), Slovenian historian and curator
- Valentin Lazăr (born 1989), Romanian footballer

== Fictional characters ==
- Lazar Wolf, wealthy butcher in Fiddler on the Roof
- Marketa Lazarová Czech novel and film
- Abigail Lazar, the titular anti-villain in Abigail
- Laz Delgado, in Empire

== See also ==
- Lazare
- Lázaro
- Lazzaro
- Lazar (disambiguation)
- Tsar Lazar Guard, Serbian nationalist political organization
- Lazarević
- Lazarev
- Lazarevski
