= Lazarevsky =

Index article

Lazarevsky (Russian: Ла́заревский; masculine), Lazarevskaya (Ла́заревская; feminine), or Lazarevskoye (Ла́заревское; neuter) is the name of several inhabited localities in Russia.

Modern rural localities

- Lazarevsky (rural locality), a settlement in Lazarevskaya Rural Administration of Gorodovikovsky District in the Republic of Kalmykia; 46°5′N 41°55′E
- Lazarevskoye (rural locality), a village in Yuryev-Polsky District of Vladimir Oblast
- Lazarevskaya, Kargopolsky District, Arkhangelsk Oblast, a village in Lodyginsky Selsoviet of Kargopolsky District in Arkhangelsk Oblast
- Lazarevskaya, Verkhnetoyemsky District, Arkhangelsk Oblast, a village in Novovershinsky Selsoviet of Verkhnetoyemsky District in Arkhangelsk Oblast

Abolished inhabited localities

- Lazarevskoye, a former resort settlement in Krasnodar Krai; merged into the city of Sochi in 1961 as Lazarevskoye Microdistrict

== See also ==
- Lazar (disambiguation)
- Lazarev
- Lazarevski
