= Silić =

Silić is a surname found in Bosnia and Herzegovina, Croatia and Serbia.

Notable people with the name include:

- Bruno Silić (1958–2004), Croatian water polo coach
- Dražen Silić (born 1985), Croatian bobsledder
- Mateo Silić (born 1984), Croatian footballer
- Ljubo Silić, bassist in Laufer (band)
- Toni Silić (born 2004), Croatian footballer

== Geographic distribution ==
The surname has been recorded in Kosovo, Užice, and Belgrade.

During the Ottoman period, there was a hajduk buljubaša named Silić active in Herzegovina. The surname was mentioned in 1696, when a Toma Silić was recorded. In the 19th century, a Pavle Silić was active as a painter in Belgrade. Ratomir Silić, a Partisan fighter from Užice, was captured by the Chetniks.

In Croatia, there are over 200 people with the surname. There are families with the surname in the surroundings of Split, where water polo coach Bruno and footballer Mateo were born. The nearby village of Dicmo houses a Silić family.

A Silić family settled southern Dalmatia from Trebinje in 1730; the first to settle was Miće Silić, the son of Nikola; their slava is St. Martin (1968).

In Mostar, Bosnia and Herzegovina, there were 3 households of a Silić family recorded in 1925. The surname has been recorded in Montenegro.

A Silić family settled in Janun near Nablus in Palestine, along with other Yugoslav families.

== See also ==
- Siliqi, Albanian surname
- Vasilić, Serbian surname
