= Siliqi =

Siliqi is an Albanian surname. Notable people with the surname include:

- Drago Siliqi (1930–1963), Albanian poet
- Llazar Siliqi (1924–2001), Albanian poet
- Risto Siliqi (1882–1936), Albanian poet
- Teodor Siliqi (1931–2011), Albanian chess master
