= Kim Johannesen =

Kim Johannesen may refer to:

- Kim Johannesen (handballer) (born 1979), Danish handball player
- Kim Johannesen (musician) (born 1985), Norwegian jazz musician
