= Ivan Argunov =

Russian painter (1729–1802)

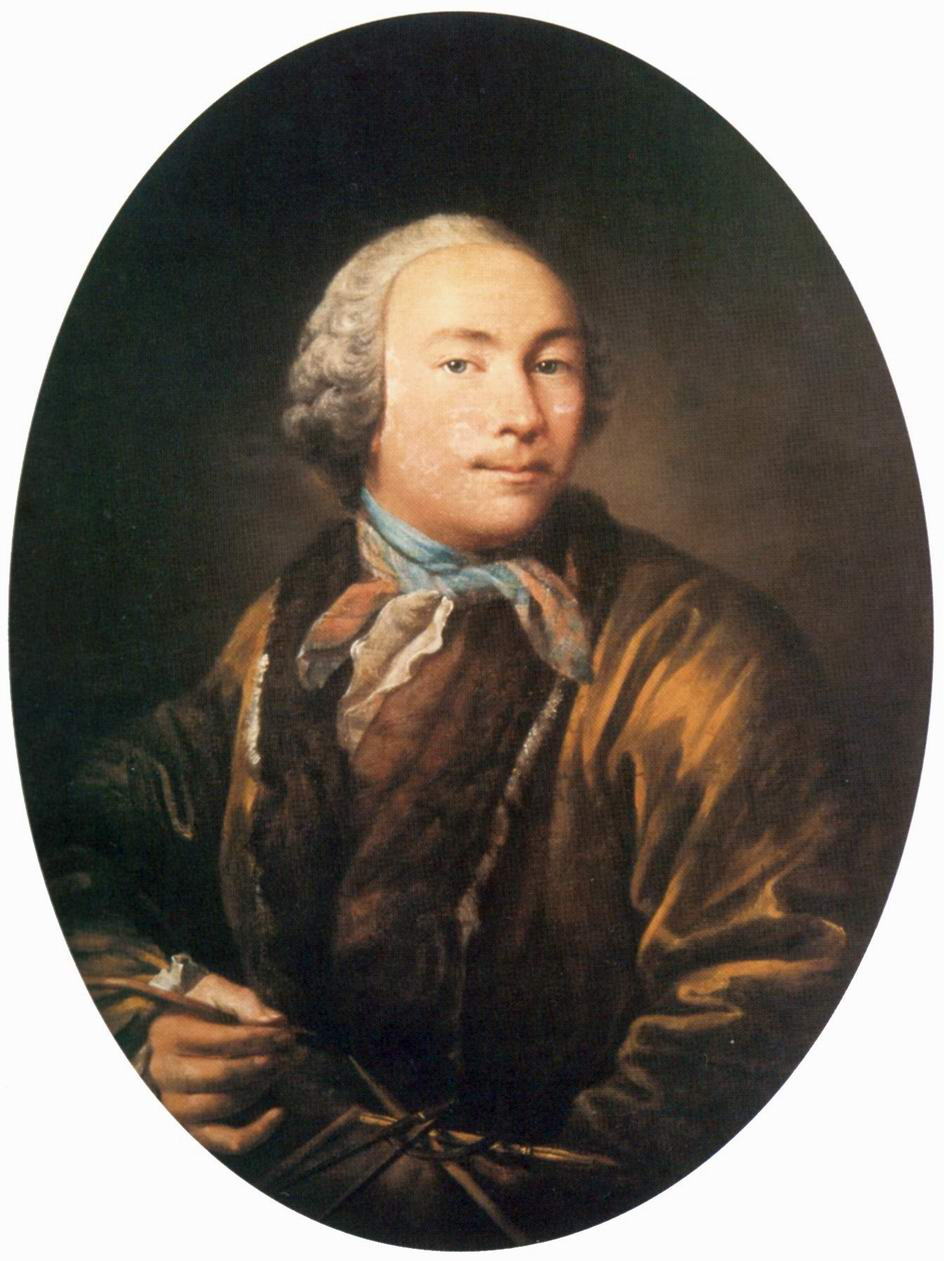
Self-portrait, late 1750s

Ivan Petrovich Argunov (Russian: Иван Петрович Аргунов; 1729–1802) was a Russian painter and teacher. He was one of the founders of the Russian school of portrait painting.

== Biography ==
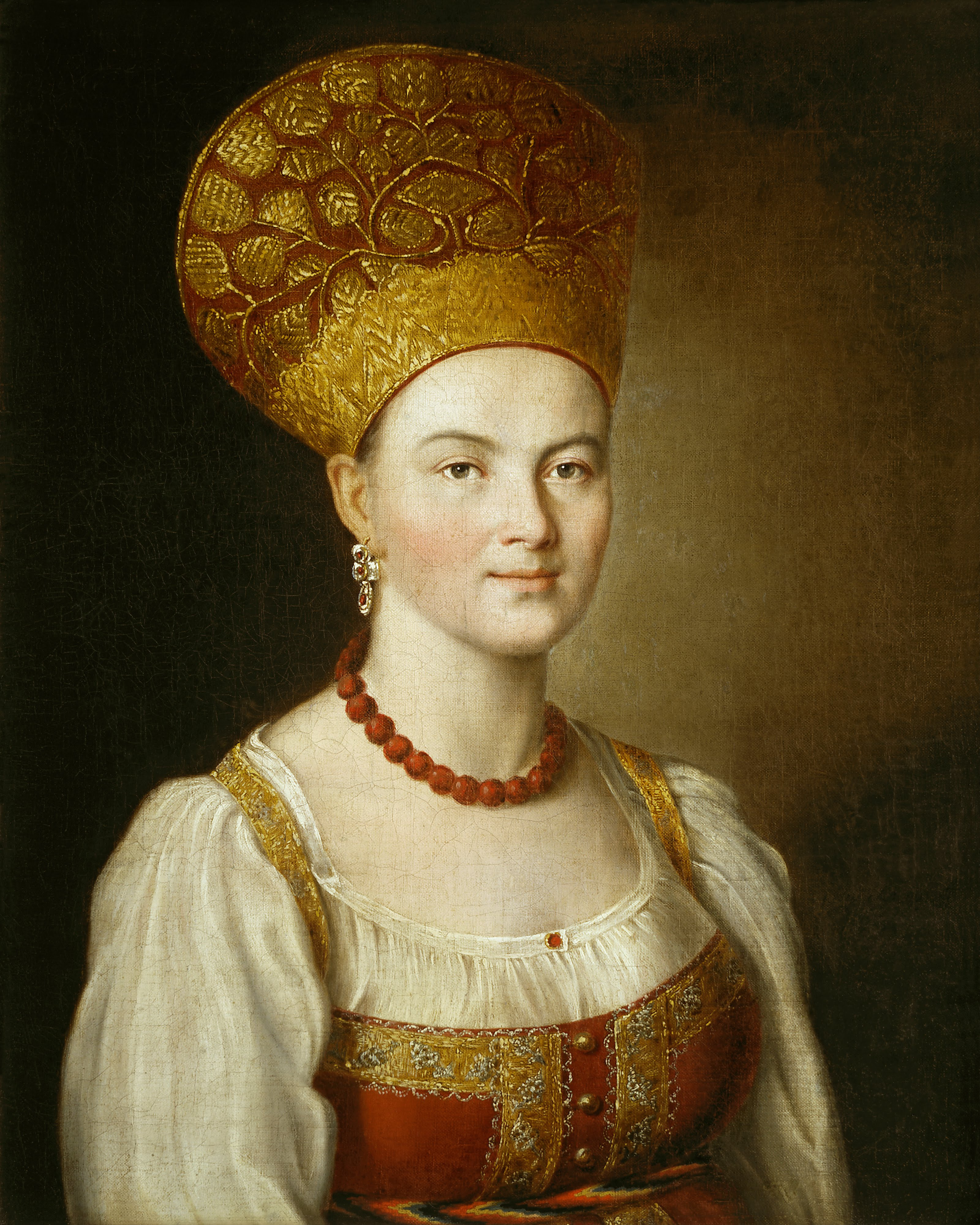
Portrait of an unknown peasant, 1784

Born in 1729, Ivan Argunov came from a family of serfs belonging to the Counts Sheremetev. He had grown up in the family of his uncle, Semyon Mikhaylovich Argunov, who was a steward of princess Cherkassky and later a majordomo for the Counts Sheremetev. For many years, Semyon managed Sheremetev's house on Millionnaya Street in Saint Petersburg, the house where Ivan grew up.

In 1746–1749, Ivan Argunov studied painting with a German artist named Georg Grooth, who at the time was in the employ of Empress Elizabeth of Russia. Ivan also received lessons from his cousins Fedor Leontyevich Argunov and Fedor Semenovich Argunov, painters working in Saint Petersburg on decorating the imperial residences.

Argunov's first works were icons for the church of the Catherine Palace in Tsarskoe Selo (1753) and for the New Jerusalem Monastery (1749). At that time he also created his only known historical painting Dying Cleopatra. His earliest known portraits were of Prince Ivan Ivanovich Lobanov-Rostovsky (1752) and Princess Ekaterina Alexandrovna Lobanova-Rostovskaya (1754). There can be seen the old traditions of traditional Russian parsuna (portrait) art mixed with the new Baroque influence.

During the 1760s, Argunov was in his prime. He created many beautiful parade and psychological portraits and icons. Among his subjects were Russian royalty and of course Argunov's masters the Sheremetevs as well as their relatives the Lazarevs and the Counts Tolstoy. He was one of the creators of the genre of posthumous portraits, painting many dead Sheremetevs.

In 1770, Argunov became the major-domo for the Sheremetevs' house on Millionnaya Street, then the major-domo of the Moscow house of the Sheremetevs, then one of the stewards for their estates (chlen krepostnoj kollegii grafov Sheremetevs). He painted much less but it was in that time (1784) he created his masterpiece Portrait of an Unknown Woman in Peasant Dress. The identity of the sitter for the painting remains uncertain, whilst studies have suggested that she was the serf actress and singer of the Counts Sheremetev, Anna Kovalyova-Zhemchugova, it has equally been supposed that it was not in fact an official portrait of her, but rather an image of an unidentified wet nurse, taken from amongst the Seremetevs' serfs. Between the second half of 1780s and his death in 1802, Argunov did not paint but spent all his time managing different estates and businesses of the Sheremetevs.

Argunov was an important teacher of art. He taught painting classes beginning in 1753 — before the opening of the Imperial Academy of Arts in 1757. Among his students were Anton Losenko, Fyodor Rokotov, Kirill Golovachevsky and Ivan Sablukov — all four future teachers of the Academy. Argunov's sons were also his pupils. Two of them—Nikolay Argunov and Yakov Argunov—became painters, while the third—Pavel Argunov—became an architect.

He died in Moscow in 1802.

== Selected works ==
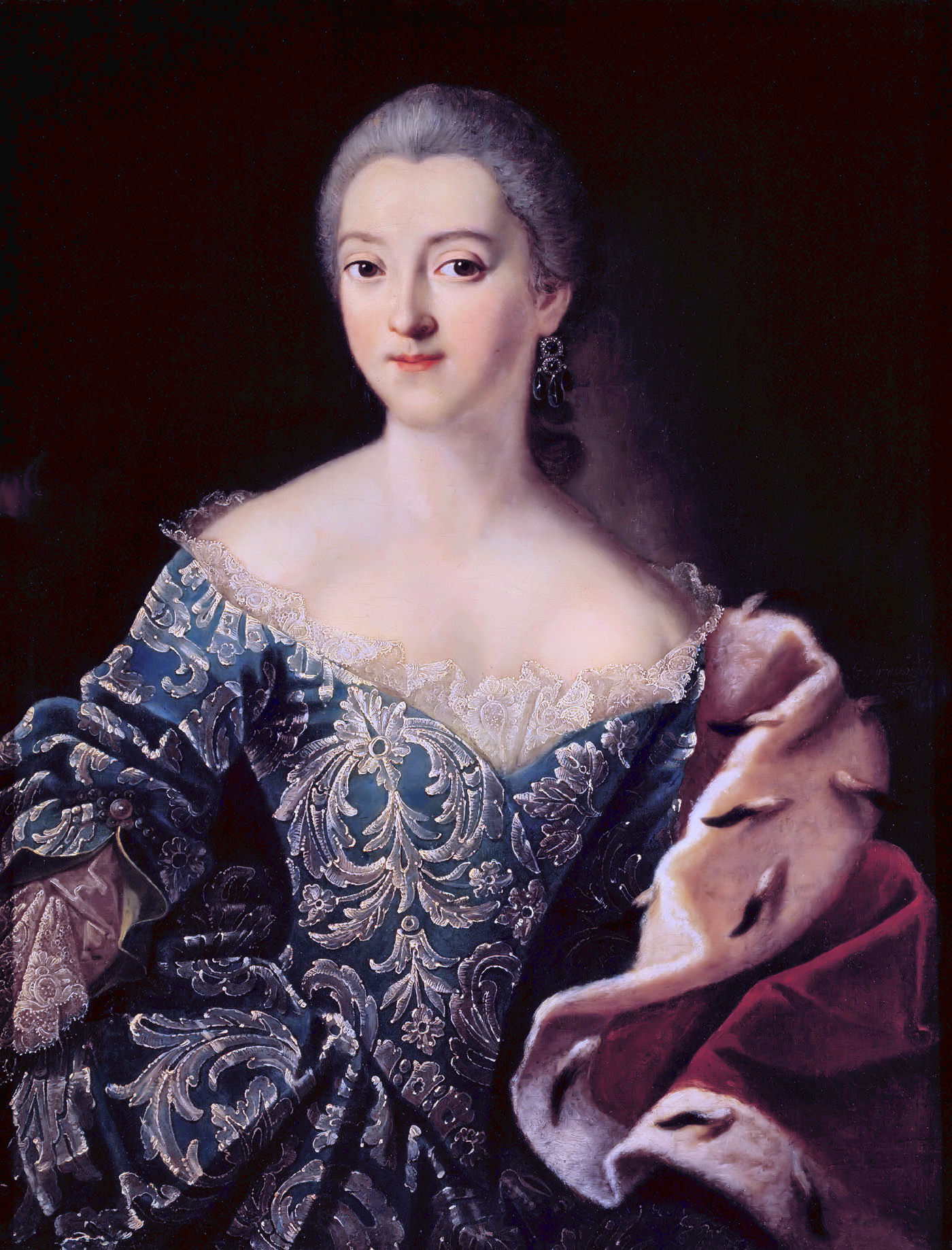
Portrait of Princess Ekaterina Alexandrovna Lobanova-Rostovskaya, 1754

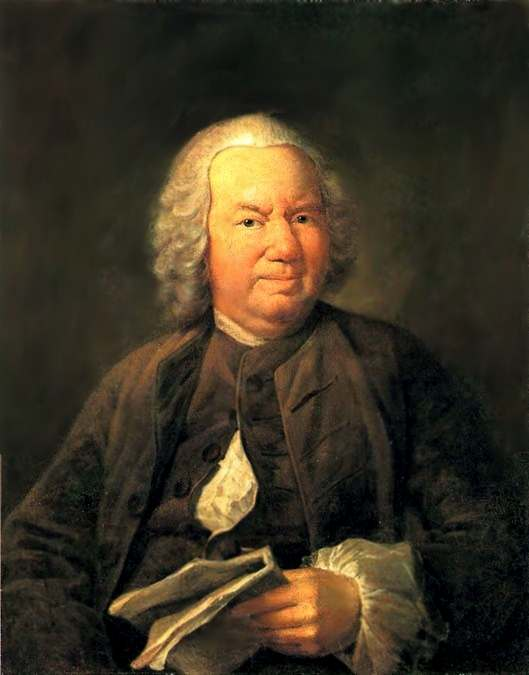
Portrait of K.A. Khripunov, 1757.

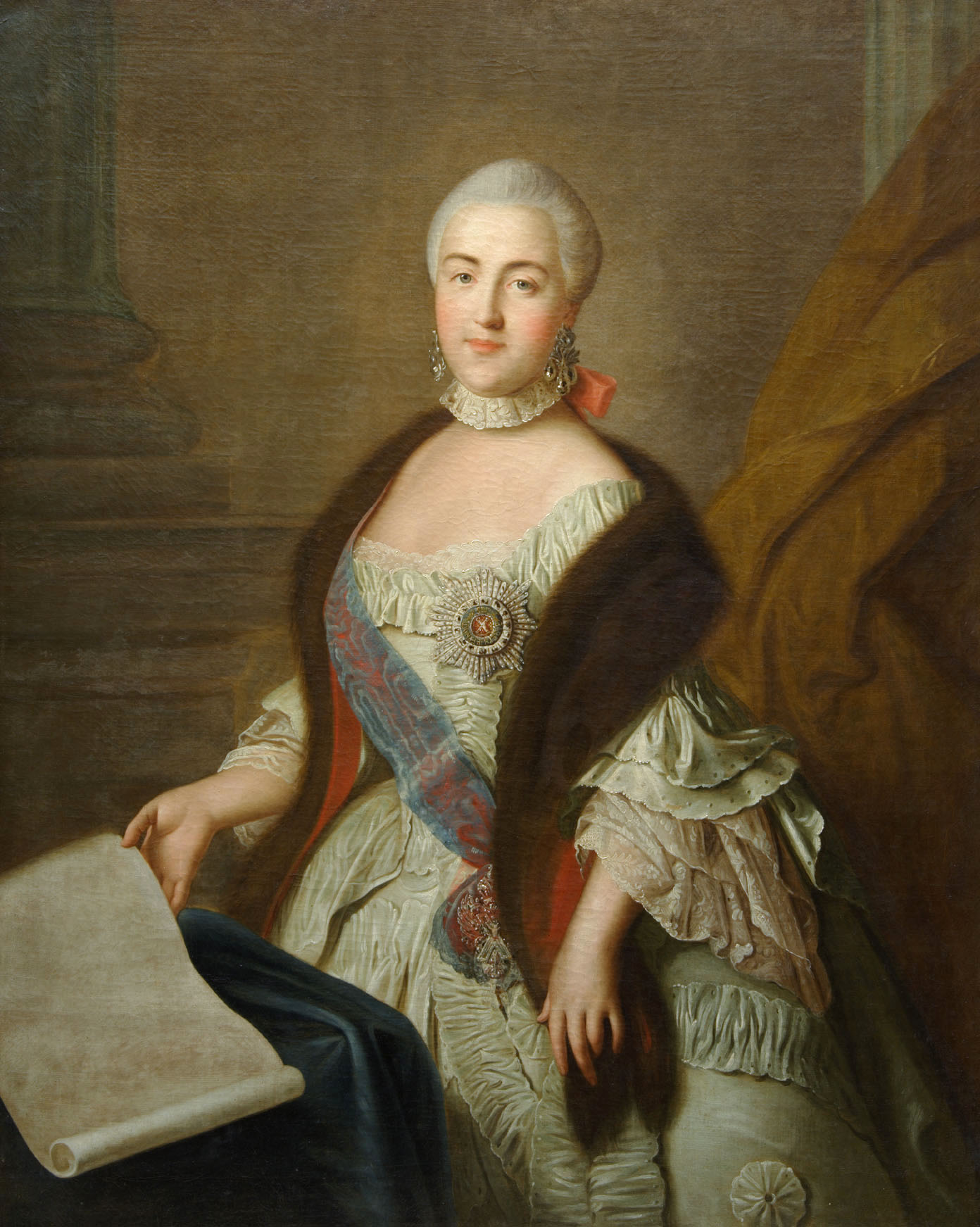
Portrait of Grand Duchess Ekaterina Alexeyevna

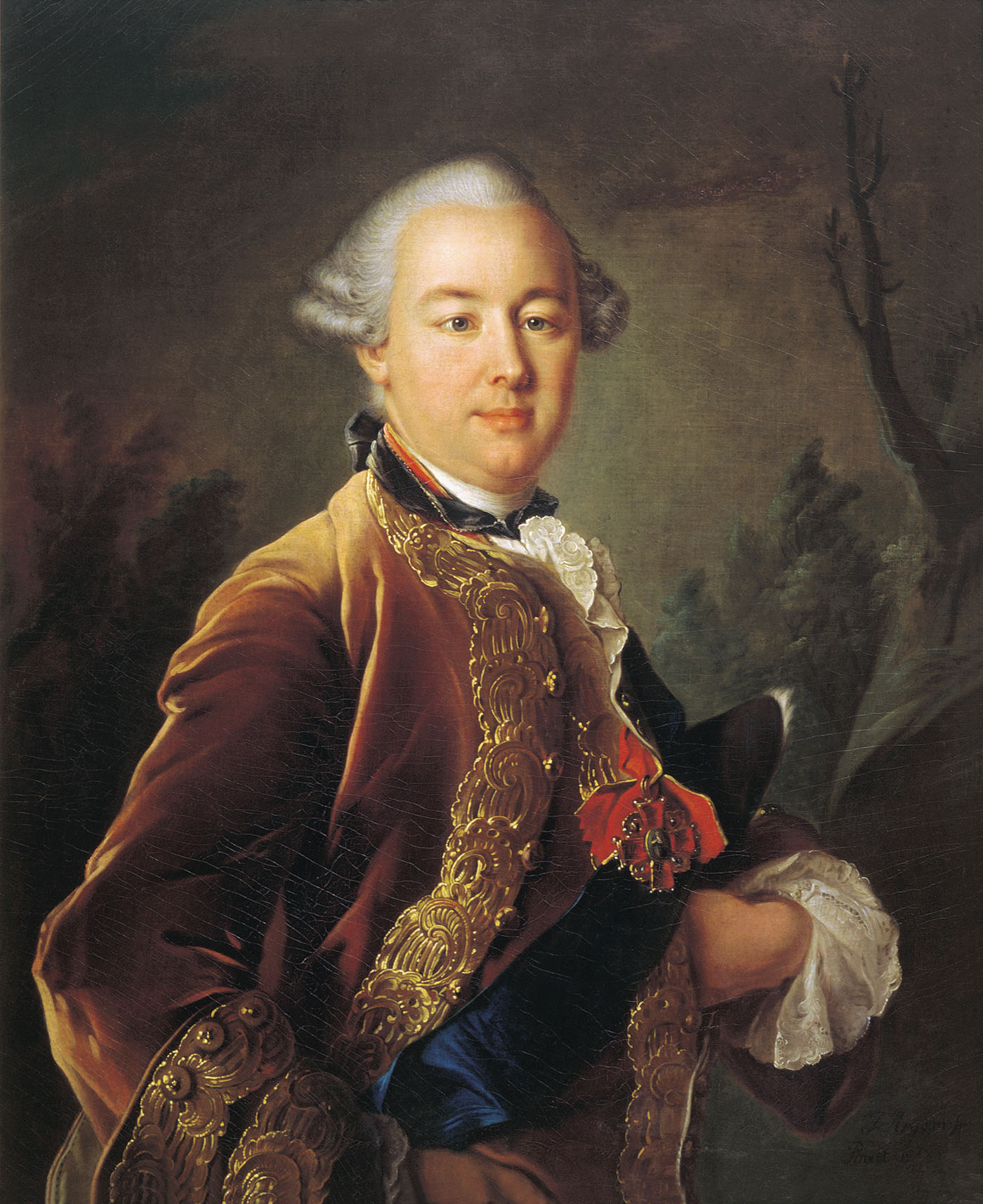
Portrait of P.B. Sheremetev (artist's owner), 1760

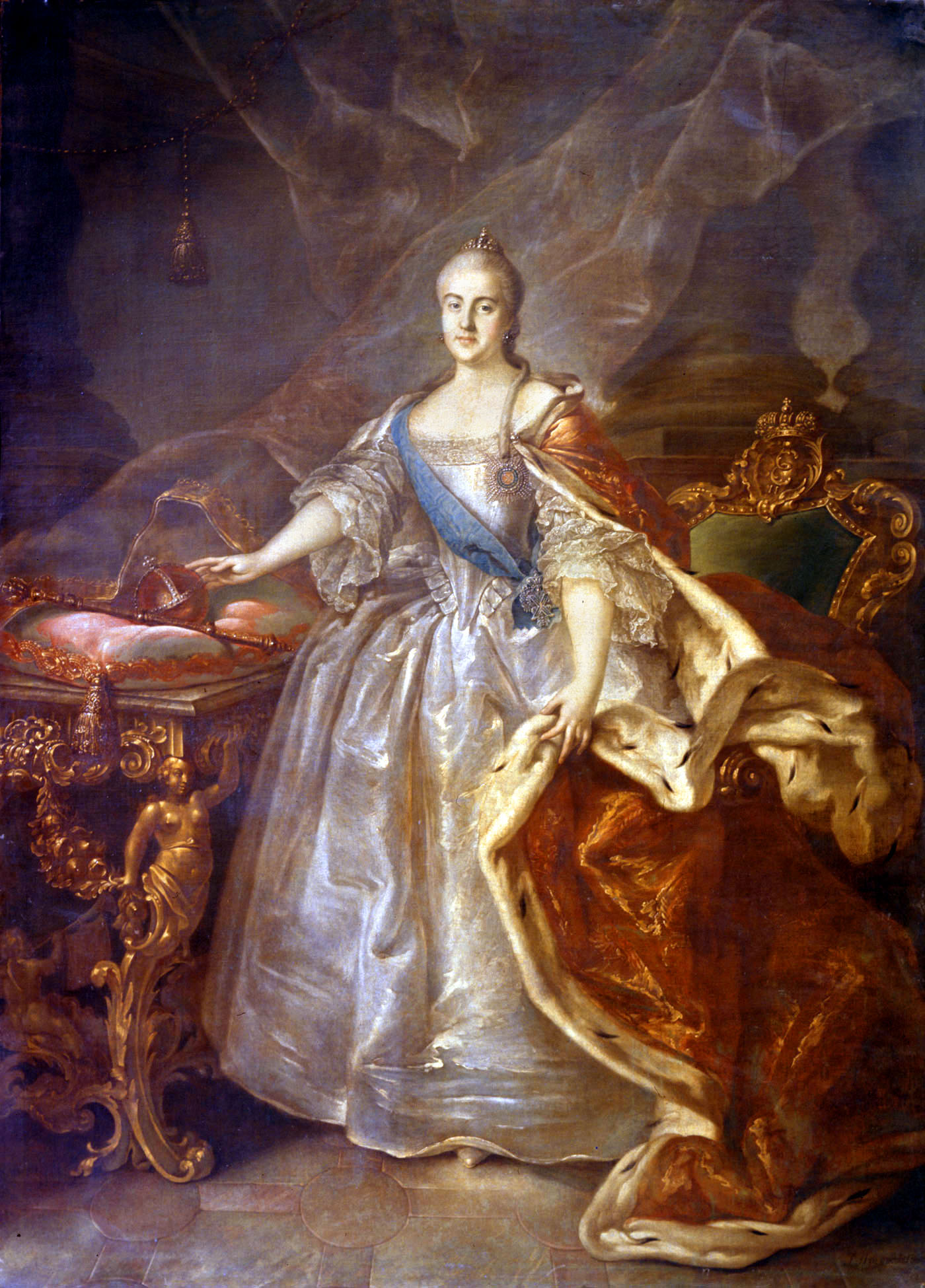
Portrait of Catherine II, 1762

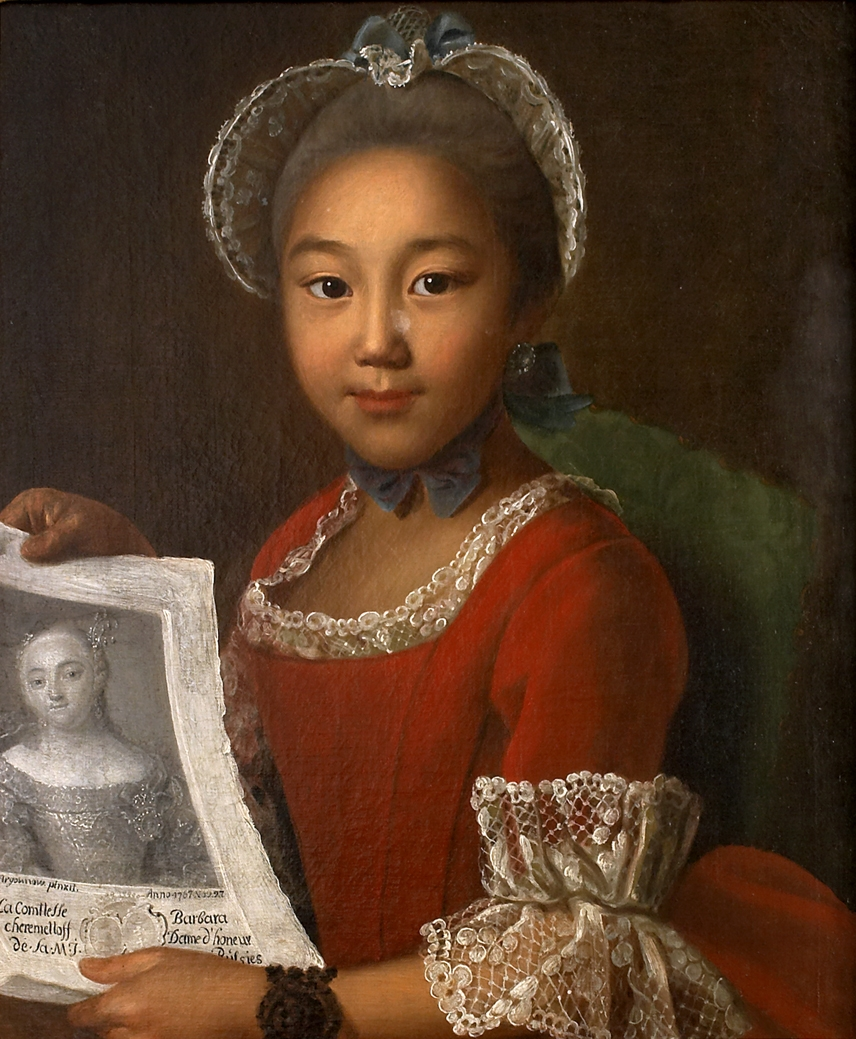
Portrait of Kalmyk girl Annushka. 1767. Annushka was a pupil and a serf of Varvara Sheremetev. In her hands she holds the portrait of her late benefactor.

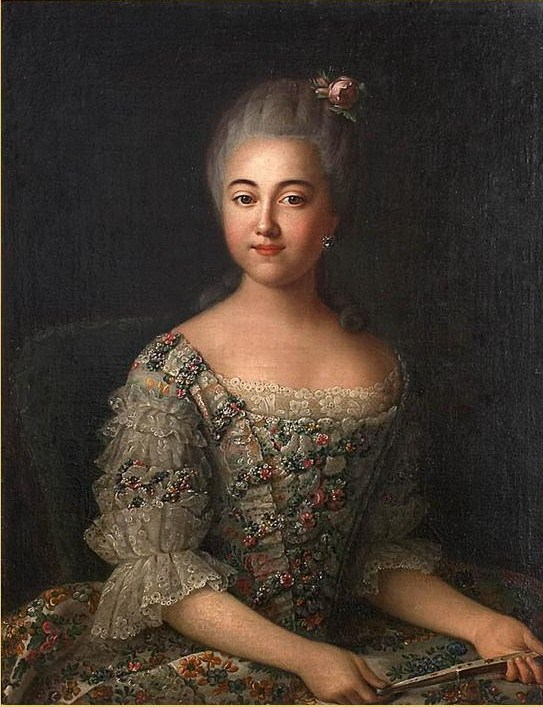
Portrait of Countess Varvara Sheremetev, daughter of Argunov's owner

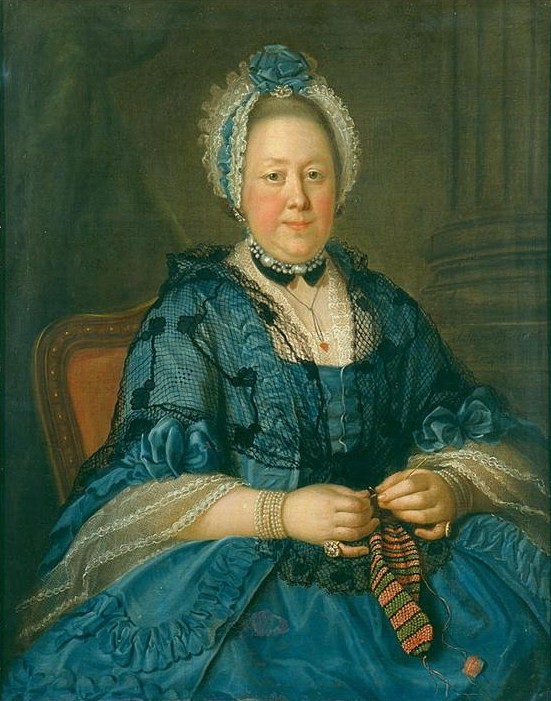
Portrait of Countess Tolstoy, née Lopukhina, 1768

== See also ==
- List of Russian artists

== Sources ==
- "Аргуновы" . Brockhaus and Efron Encyclopedic Dictionary (in Russian). 1906.
- Komelova, G. (2003). "Argunov, Ivan". Grove Art Online.
