= Lazarev Island =

Island in the South Atlantic Ocean

- Interactive map of Lazarev Island

Geography
- Location: South Atlantic Ocean
- Coordinates: 54.748899999999999°S 36.3171999999999997°W
- Archipelago: Kupriyanov Islands (South Georgia)

Administration
- United Kingdom

Demographics
- Population: Uninhabited

Lazarev Island is an island in the South Georgia Archipelago in the South Atlantic Ocean. It is the northernmost of the Kupriyanov Islands and is located northwest of the entrance to Diaz Cove.

It was named by the UK Antarctic Place-Names Committee in 2009 after Mikhail Lazarev (1788–1851), commander of the sloop-of-war "Mirny" on the first Russian Antarctic expedition (1819–1821) led by Faddey Bellingshausen.

== See also ==
- Lazareva Island
- Lazarev atoll

== Sources ==
- Lazarev Island. Entry in the database of the UK Antarctic Place-Names Committee for South Georgia and the South Sandwich Islands
