= Lazarevski =

Lazarevski (Macedonian: Лазаревски) is a common Macedonian surname. Notable people with the surname include:

- Dimitrija Lazarevski (born 1982), Macedonian footballer
- Goran Lazarevski (born 1974), Macedonian football midfielder
- Sašo Lazarevski (born 1978), Macedonian footballer
- Nenad Lazarevski (born 1986), Serbian footballer
- Vlade Lazarevski (born 1983), Macedonian footballer

== See also ==
- Lazarev
- Lazar (disambiguation)
- Lazarevsky
