= Lazareff =

Lazareff is a surname of Russian origin that may refer to the following notable people:

- Fiona Scott Lazareff, British activist
- Hélène Gordon-Lazareff (1909–1988), French journalist of Russian Jewish origin
- Michèle Lazareff Rosier (1930–2017), French fashion journalist and designer, daughter of Hélène
- Pierre Lazareff (1907–1972), French newspaper editor and publisher, husband of Hélène
- Serge Lazareff (1944–2021), Australian actor

== See also ==
- Lazarev (surname)
