= Athanas Shundi =

Albanian politician (1892–1940)

- In office 12 April 1939 – 18 February 1940

Personal details
- Born: October 18, 1892 Tirana, then Ottoman Empire (modern day Albania)
- Died: February 18, 1940 (aged 47) Turin, Italy
- Resting place: Tirana, Albania
- Citizenship: Albania
- Relations: Darinë Siliqi and Laurën Siliqi (granddaughters)
- Children: Drita Siliqi (nee Shundi) (daughter)
- Education: University of Naples
- Occupation: Pharmacist, politician
- Profession: Pharmacist
- Known for: Member of the Autocephalist movement of the Albanian Orthodox Church, and Member of the Parliament of Albania

Athanas Shundi (18 October 1892 – 18 February 1940) was an Albanian patriot and an important member of the autocephalist movement of the Albanian Orthodox Church. In his last years of life he was also involved in politics, as a member of the Tirana's city council, as well as a member of the Constituent Assembly of Albania during the legislature of 12 April 1939 - 1 April 1940.

== Biography ==
A Shundi was born on October 18, 1892, in Tirana, then part of the Ottoman Empire, today modern Albania. The Shundi family was part of the Christian Orthodox community of Tirana, which had moved to the city from Southeastern Albania during the 18th century. The family appears in the church register of the Saint Procopius since 1818, where it is listed as a donator of the church's building during 1790–1797, as part of the tinsmith esnaf, and later, with its last name, Shundi, since 1830.

After finishing the grammar school of the St. Procopius Church of Tirana, A. Shundi pursued the Greek gymnasium of Manastir, where he graduated in 1910. On that same year he started to work as a teacher at the St. Procopius school church, and, in 1913, he started to teach in the first Albanian language school of Tirana, which had just opened. During that period, A. Shundi was engaged in the Albanian Awakening movement. In 1912 he enrolled in a Medical School in Istanbul, however he had to interrupt his studies, as a result of the First Balkan War. During 1913-1919 he worked as a counselor in the Mayor of Tirana's office. In 1919 he enrolled at the University of Naples in Italy. In Naples he was one of the initiators and then president of the association of the Albanian students "Naim Frashëri". In 1924 he graduated in chemistry and pharmacy. After working as an assistant professor at the University of Naples for a year, he returned to Albania in 1925 and opened a private pharmacy there.

In 1929 A. Shundi was nominated as one of the executors of the will of Mid'hat Frashëri, who had then fled Albania, as a result of his political conflicts with Zog I of Albania. Frashëri's will had as its main goal the preservation of his personal library and its usage to create an Albanological Institute.

In 1929 A. Shundi became part of the elders' council of the St Procopius church of Tirana. He was one of the three delegates from Tirana at the Second Orthodox Congress of the Albanian Orthodox Church (the first Congress being that of Berat in 1922). The Congress gathered in 16–30 June 1929 in Korçë, and approved a new statute for internal administration of the Albanian Orthodox Church. The Statute modified the decisions of the Berat Congress of 1922 and determined that the metropolitan, the bishops and their deputies should be of Albanian blood and language, and have the Albanian citizenship, through article 16 of the statute. In January 1930 A. Shundi became dean of the Archbishopric of Tirana.

During the 1930s A. Shundi become involved in local politics by being elected several times in a row as member of the City Council of Tirana. During the legislature of 12 April 1939 - 1 April 1940 A. Shundi was nominated member of the Parliament of Albania. He passed on 18 February 1940 in Turin, Italy, because of health issues.

Shundi had 2 daughters, one of them being Drita Siliqi (nee Shundi) the wife of Drago Siliqi, she had 2 daughters with Drago, Darinë Siliqi and Laurën Siliqi which are Shundi's granddaughters.

== Sources ==
- Bido, Ardit (2015), Autoqefalia e Kishës Ortodokse të Shqipërisë në marrëdhëniet shqiptaro-greke, 1918-1937 (PDF) (in Albanian), UNIVERSITETI I TIRANËS, FAKULTETI I HISTORISË DHE I FILOLOGJISË, DEPARTAMENTI I HISTORISË
- Bido, Ardit (2021), The Albanian Orthodox Church: A Political History, 1878–1945, Routledge, ISBN 9780429755477
- Beduli, Dhimitër (1997), Kodiku i Kishës së Shën Prokopit të Tiranës 1818-1922 (in Albanian), Kisha Orthodhokse Autoqefale e Shqipërisë
- Beduli, Dhimitër (2010), Shënime për bashkësinë ortodokse të Tiranës (in Albanian), Neraida
- Demneri, Ismail (2009), Tirana, Personalitete, Intelektualë të hershëm (PDF) (in Albanian), Shoqata "Tirana"
