= Diaz Cove =

Diaz Cove (54°45′S 36°18′W) is a cove with the Kupriyanov Islands at the mouth, 10 nautical miles (19 km) northwest of Cape Disappointment, near the east end of the south coast of South Georgia. The cove was known to early sealers as shown by the remains of a sealing vessel found there. It was rediscovered in 1929 by Captain Johannesen and named for his ship the Diaz.
