= Johannesen =

Johannesen is a surname. Notable people with the surname include:

- Aksel V. Johannesen (born 1972), Faroese lawyer and politician
- Eric Johannesen (born 1988), German rower
- Frank Johannesen (born 1959), Norwegian sprint canoeist
- Georg Johannesen (1931–2005), Norwegian writer
- Glenn Johannesen (born 1962), Canadian ice hockey player
- Grant Johannesen (1921–2005), American classical pianist
- Johan Johannesen (1898–1979), Norwegian long jumper
- Kaj Leo Johannesen (born 1964), Faroese footballer and Prime Minister of the Faroe Islands
- Kim Johannesen (handballer) (born 1979), Danish handball player
- Kim Johannesen (musician) (born 1985), Norwegian jazz musician
- Knut Johannesen (born 1933), Norwegian speed skater
- Olav Tuelo Johannesen (born 1984), Norwegian footballer
- Óli Johannesen (born 1972), Norwegian footballer
- Sofus Johannesen (born 2007), Danish footballer

== See also ==
- Johannesen Point, a headland of South Georgia
