= Aeroflot Flight 012 =

1963 aviation accident

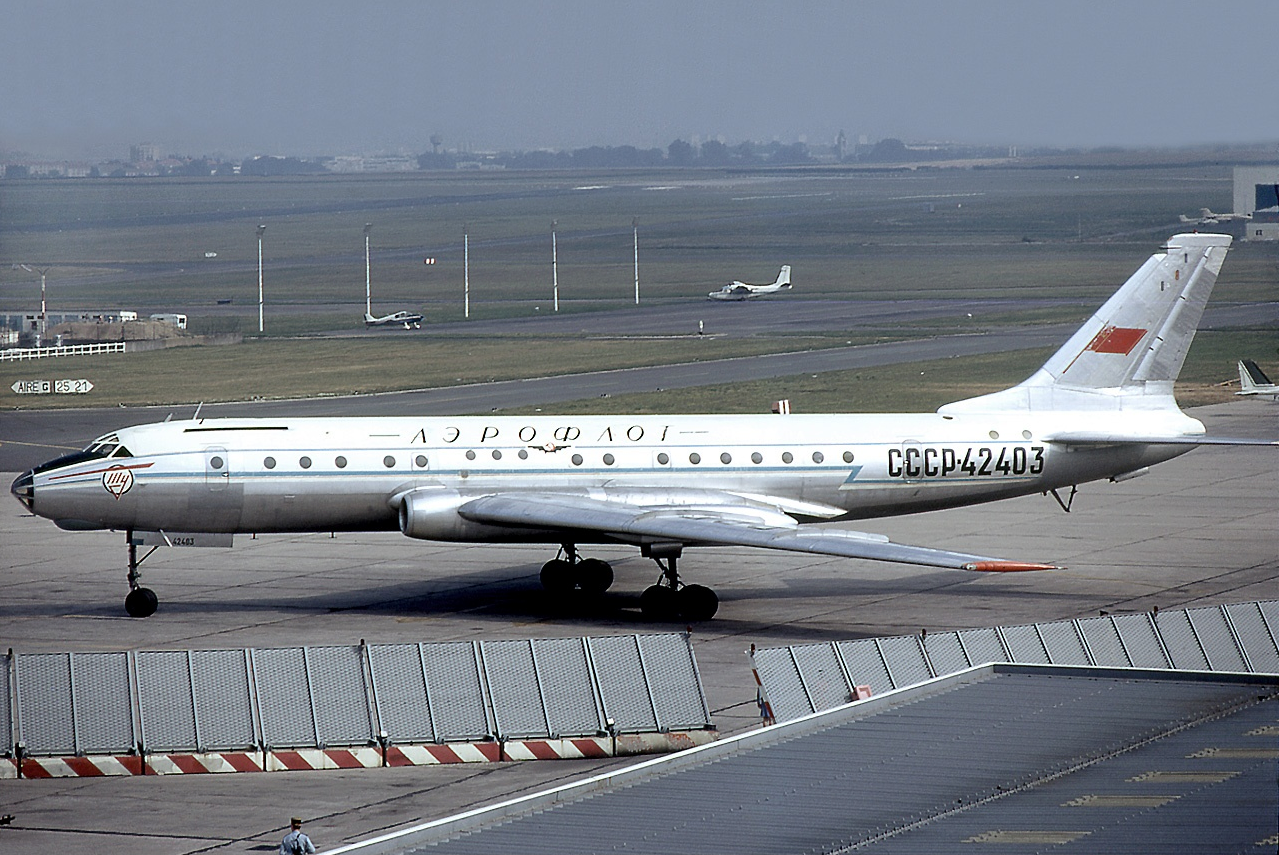
- An Aeroflot Tu-104B similar to the one involved in the accident

Accident
- Date: 13 July 1963
- Summary: Controlled flight into terrain
- Site: Near Irkutsk Airport, Irkutsk, USSR; 52.2533°N 104.4372°E

Aircraft
- Aircraft type: Tupolev Tu-104B
- Operator: Aeroflot
- Registration: CCCP-42492
- Flight origin: Beijing Capital International Airport, China
- Stopover: Irkutsk Airport, Irkutsk, USSR
- Destination: Sheremetyevo Airport, Moscow, USSR
- Passengers: 27
- Crew: 8
- Fatalities: 33
- Survivors: 2

Aeroflot Flight 012 was a scheduled international passenger flight from Being Capital International Airport in Beijing, China, to Sheremetyevo Airport in Moscow, Soviet Union, with a stopover at Irkutsk Airport in Irkutsk, Soviet Union. On Saturday, July 13, 1963, the Tupolev Tu-104 operatong this route crashed on landing at the scheduled stopover in Irkutsk. 33 of the 35 people on board were killed in the crash.

== Aircraft ==
The aircraft involved was a Tupolev Tu-104B, registration CCCP-42492.

== Synopsis ==
The plane took off from Beijing around 2:49am Moscow time en route to Irkutsk at 9,000 meters. With low cloud cover over the Irkutsk airport, the crew received contradictory weather data about the low height of the cloud tops. The plane ended up descending too early. Upon exiting the cloud cover less than 60 meters from the ground, the pilots attempted to take evasive action but could not and the plane impacted terrain two miles short of the runway around 10am local time.

== Casualties ==
33 of the 35 people on board died in the crash, including all eight crew members and 25 passengers. Two passengers survived. Among the dead were seven Albanians including the Albanian and poet Drago Siliqi, as well as 5 Czechoslovaks, three Chinese, and three Colombians. The remains of the Albanian and Chinese victims were taken to Beijing for a major public burial attended by Premier Zhou Enlai. In contrast, a United States aviation periodical noted the Soviet press "virtually ignored" the crash.
