= Marianna Raguž =

Croatian basketball player

Personal information
- Born: September 19, 1975 (age 51) Canada
- Listed height: 1.80 m (5 ft 11 in)

Career information
- Playing career: –2009
- Position: Power forward

Career history
- Maccabi R. Hen
- Union Hainaut
- –2005: Ramat Hasharon
- 2005: Gospić
- 2006: Ramat Hasharon
- Our West Elite
- 2007–2008: Gospić
- 2008–2009: Jolly JBS

Marianna Raguž (born 19 September 1975) is a former Croatian female professional basketball player.
