= Ivan Lazarev =

Ivan Lazarev is the name of:

- Ivan Lazarev (basketball) (born 1991), Russian basketball player
- Ivan Lazarev (luger) (born 1983), Russian natural track luger
- Ivan Davidovich Lazarev (1820–1878), Russian general of Armenian origin
- Ivan Lazarevich Lazarev (1735–1801), Russian jeweler of Armenian origin
- Ivan Petrovich Lazarev (died 1803), Russian general killed by Mariam of Georgia, Mariam Tsitsishvili
