= Lazarevskaya, Kargopolsky District, Arkhangelsk Oblast =

Lazarevskaya Лазаревская
- Village
- Location within Arkhangelsk Oblast Location within Russia
- Coordinates: 61°29′N 39°28′E
- Country: Russia
- Region: Arkhangelsk Oblast
- District: Kargopolsky District
- Time zone: UTC+3:00

Lazarevskaya (Russian: Лазаревская) is a rural locality (a village) in Kargopolsky District, Arkhangelsk Oblast, Russia. The population was 92 as of 2012. There are 2 streets.

== Geography ==
Lazarevskaya is located 33 km east of Kargopol (the district's administrative centre) by road. Stegnevskaya is the nearest rural locality.
