= Yekaterina Gokhman =

Russian association football player (born 1990)

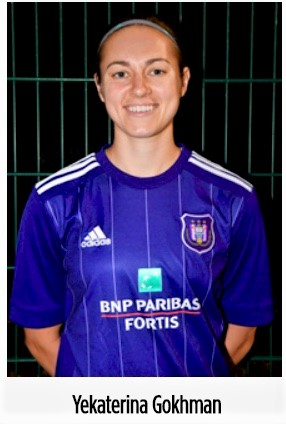

Personal information
- Full name: Yekaterina Lazareva Gokhman
- Date of birth: 25 March 1990 (age 36)
- Height: 1.64 m (5 ft 4 1/2 in)
- Position: Midfielder

College career
| Years | Team | Apps | (Gls) |
| 2010–2011 | Florida State Seminoles | | |

Senior career*
| Years | Team | Apps | (Gls) |
| 2012–2013 | Ryazan VDV | 9 | (0) |
| 2013–2014 | Kokkola F10 | 10 | (0) |
| 2014–2015 | Víkingur Ólafsvík | 15 | (5) |
| 2015–2016 | Apollon Limassol | | |
| 2016–2017 | ŽFK Spartak Subotica | | |
| 2017–2018 | RSC Anderlecht | | |

International career
| 2007–2009 | Russia U-19 | 16 | (3) |
| 2014– | Russia | 4 | (1) |
- * Club domestic league appearances and goals

Yekaterina (Katya) Lazareva Gokhman (also translated as Ekaterina, born 25 March 1990) is a former Russian professional football defender who played for RSC Anderlecht in Belgium. She previously played in many different countries, for Ryazan VDV in the Russian Women's Football Championship league, Kokkola F10, Víkingur Ólafsvík, Apollon Limassol and Spartak Subotica, Serbia. She also played for the Russia women's national football team and the under 19 team.

== Club career ==
=== Early career ===
Gokhman was born in Moscow (Russia) and moved with her family to Atlanta (United States) in early 1992 when she was not even 2 years old. She attended Milton High School (Georgia) and played for the school team for three years before attending to Furman University and playing for the Furman Paladins for two years (2008-2009), and also for the Atlanta Silverbacks during the summer of 2010. In that same year, she enrolled at Florida State University majoring in sociology, minor in communications and playing midfielder for the Florida State Seminoles women's soccer team from 2010–2011.

=== Ryazan VDV ===
In 2012, Gokhman moved to Russia to play for Ryazan VDV in the Russian Women's Football Championship league.

=== Kokkola F10 ===
In August 2013, she signed with Kokkola F10 of the Naisten Liiga in Finland. She played 10 league games for the remaining season.

=== Víkingur Ólafsvík ===
In May 2014, she signed with Icelandic club Víkingur Ólafsvík and played entire season in the 1 Deild Kvenna, scoring 5 goals in 15 league matches.

=== Apollon Limassol ===
In January 2015, she signed a full season contract with Apollon Limassol of Cyprus. In August that year, she played all the club's three matches at the 2015–16 UEFA Women's Champions League qualifying round.

=== Spartak Subotica ===
Gokhman moved to Serbia to sign with ŽFK Spartak Subotica of the Serbian Super Liga in July 2016. She played all Spartak Subotica's three matches in the 2016–17 UEFA Women's Champions League qualifying round in August 2016.

=== RSC Anderlecht ===
In August 2017, Yekaterina Gokhman signed a contract with RSC Anderlecht, Belgium.

== International career ==
Gokhman has represented Russia on the under-19 and senior national teams. She played and scored for the Russia U-19 team in matches of the UEFA Women's Under-19 Championship in 2007/2008 and 2008/2009.

Gokhman was called up for the Russia women's national football team at the 2014 Algarve Cup. She came in as a substitute on Russia's second match against Portugal.
