= Lazareva Island =

Former island in the Aral Sea

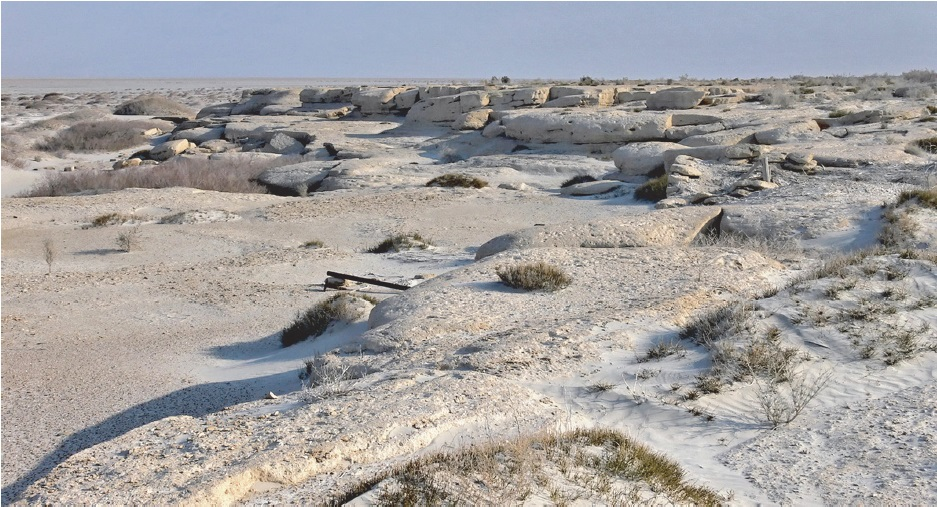
- The stone shore of the island
- Interactive map of Lazareva Island

Geography
- Location: Central Asia
- Coordinates: 44°02′N 58°53′E

Administration
- Uzbekistan

Demographics
- Population: 0 (2024)

Lazareva Island, Lazarev Island, Lazareff Island (Russian: Остров Лазарева) was an island in the Aral Sea. The former island's territory is located in Karakalpakstan, Uzbekistan.

The island was named after Mikhail Lazarev by Alexey Butakov in 1849.

== Gallery ==
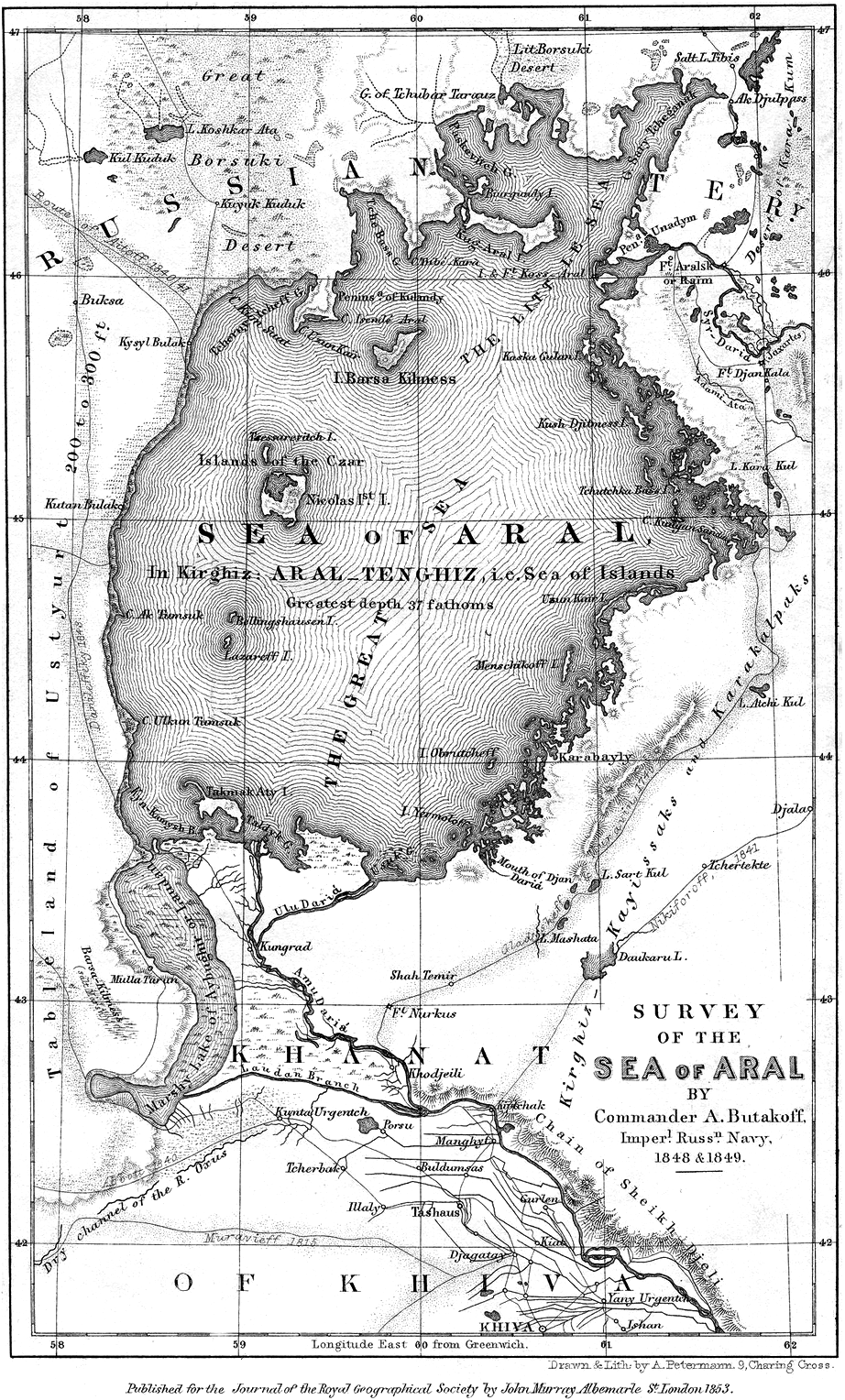
The island on the map of the Aral Sea by A. Butakov, 1853

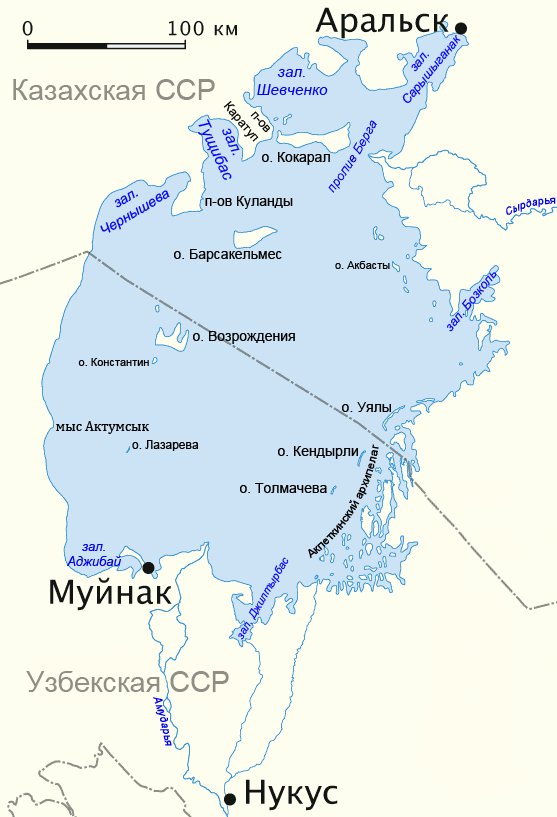
Lazareva Island on the map of the Aral Sea, 1960

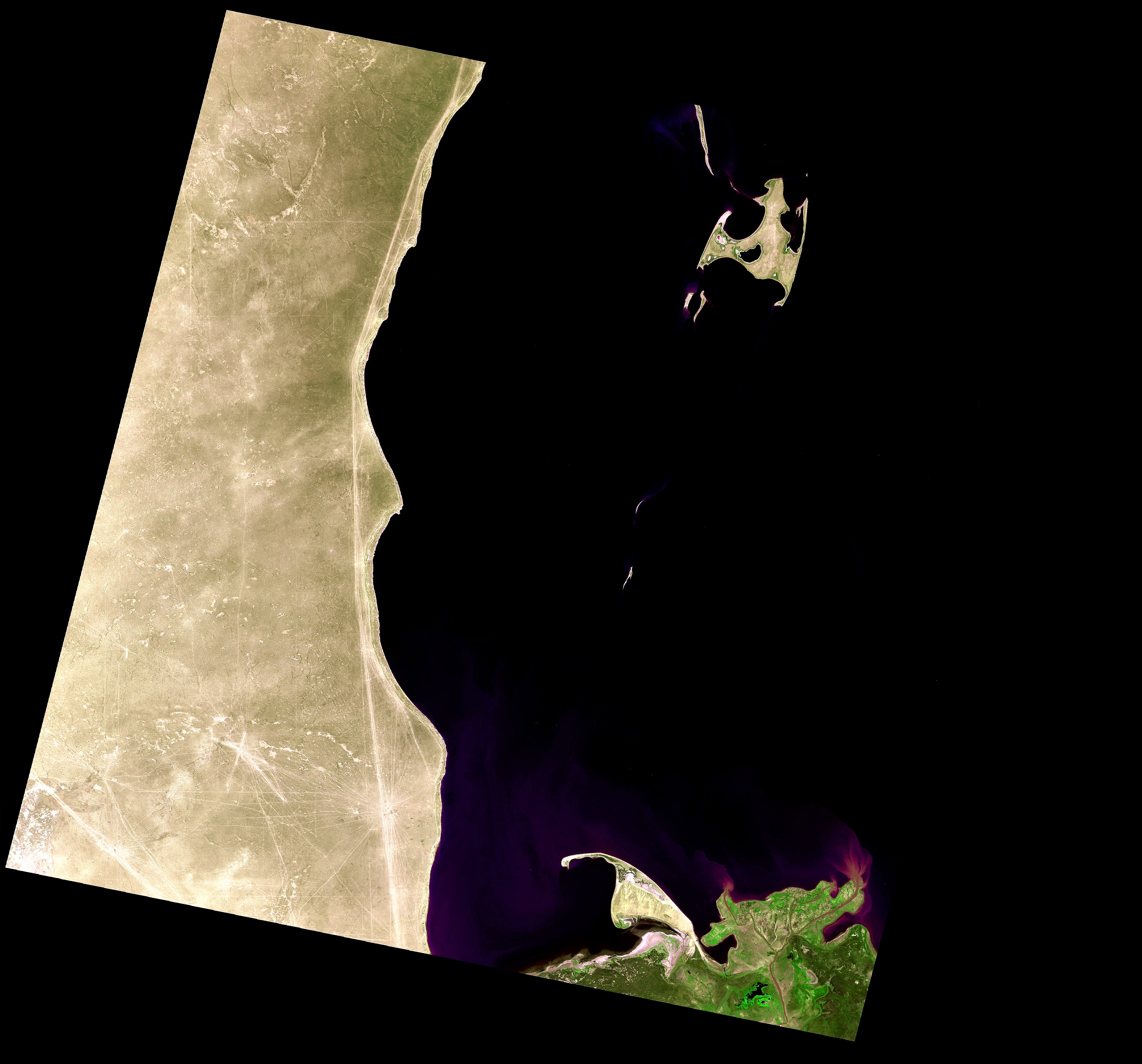
Satellite image of former Lazareva Island (on the center), 1972

== See also ==
- Lazarev Island
- Lazarev atoll

== Sources ==
- Зонн И. С. Лазарева остров // Аральская энциклопедия / Зонн И. С., Гланц М. Г.. — М. : Международные отношения, 2008. — С. 120. — 256 с. — ISBN 978-5-7133-1326-5.
- Бутаков А. И. Дневные записки плавання на шкуне «Константин» для исследования Аральского моря в 1848—1849 гг.. — Ташкент : Издательство Академии наук Узбекской ССР, 1953. — 52 с.
- Butakoff A. Survey of the Sea of Aral // The Journal of the Royal Geographical Society. — Vol. 23. — London: John Murray, 1853. — P. 93-101 : 1 map.
