= Cape Lazarev, Sevastopol =

Cape on the Crimean Peninsula

Coordinates: 44°36′49″N 33°31′59″E

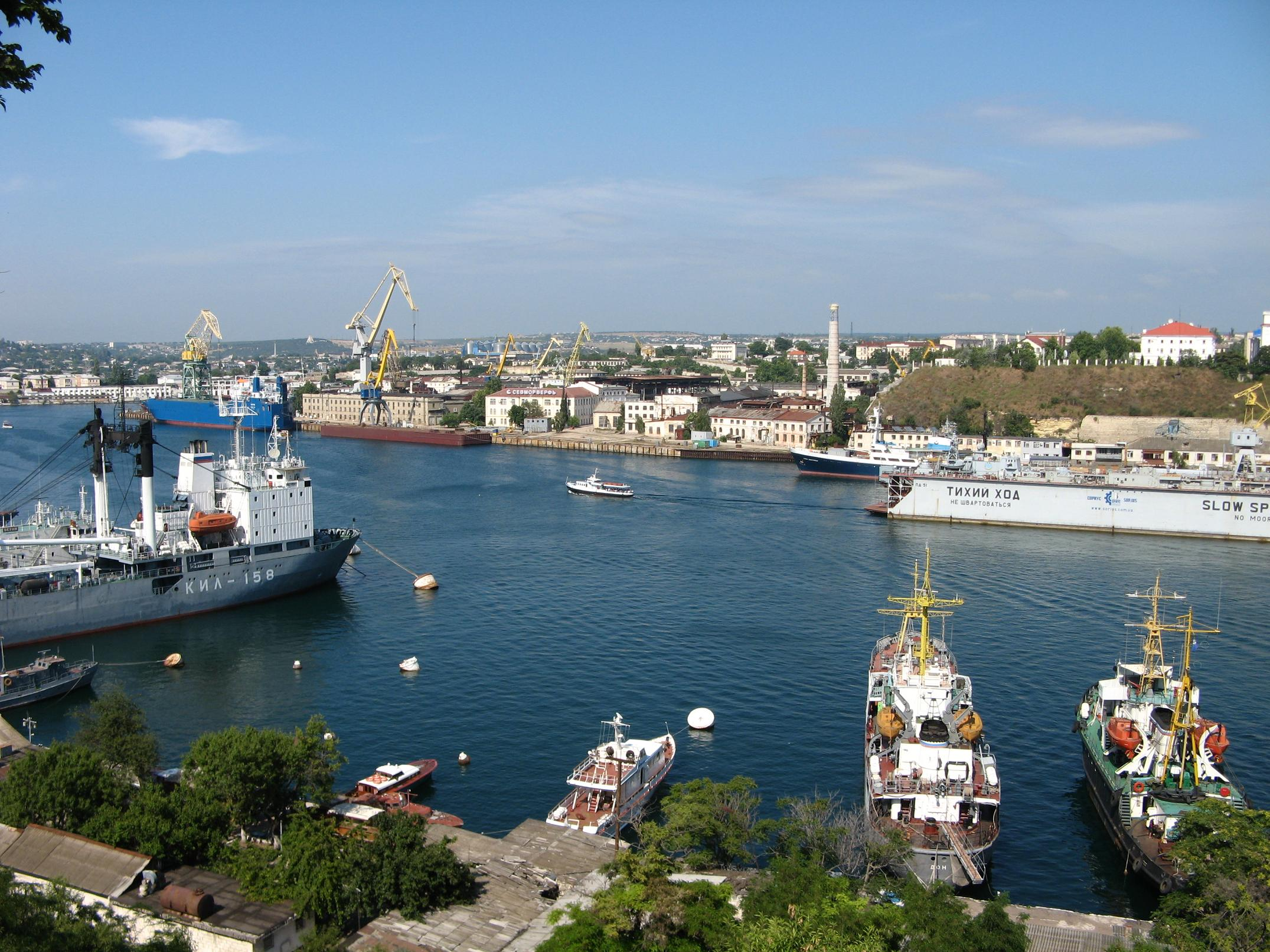
Cape Lazarev on the southern shore of the Sevastopol Bay.

Cape Lazarev (Russian: мыс Лазарева; Ukrainian: мис Лазарева) is a cape on the southern shore of the Sevastopol Bay (Black Sea) on the Crimean Peninsula.

Cape is named after Russian fleet commander and explorer Mikhail Petrovich Lazarev.

== Sources ==
- Лазарева, мыс // Топонимический словарь Севастополя. EdwART. 2011
