= Kupriyanov Islands =

Island group in South Georgia

Kupreyanov Islands

Geography
- Coordinates: 54°45′S 36°19′W
- Archipelago: South Georgia

Administration
- United Kingdom

The Kupreyanov Islands are a group of islands off the south coast of South Georgia, close south of Diaz Cove.

The name "Mys Kupreyanov was given by Admiral Fabian Gottlieb von Bellingshausen in 1819 to a cape on the coast between Novosilski Bay and Cape Disappointment. The name was evidently overlooked by Lieutenant Commander J.M. Chaplin, who in 1930 gave the name Johannesen Point to a feature on this same stretch of coast. Johannesen Point was identified by the South Georgia Survey, 1955–56, as an insignificant point not requiring a name. At the same time, the group of islands off Diaz Cove was mapped in detail for the first time. An altered form of the original Russian name has been accepted for this group.

== See also ==
- Composite Antarctic Gazetteer
- List of Antarctic islands north of 60° S
- Scientific Committee on Antarctic Research
