= Risto Siliqi =

Albanian lawyer, judge, and poet

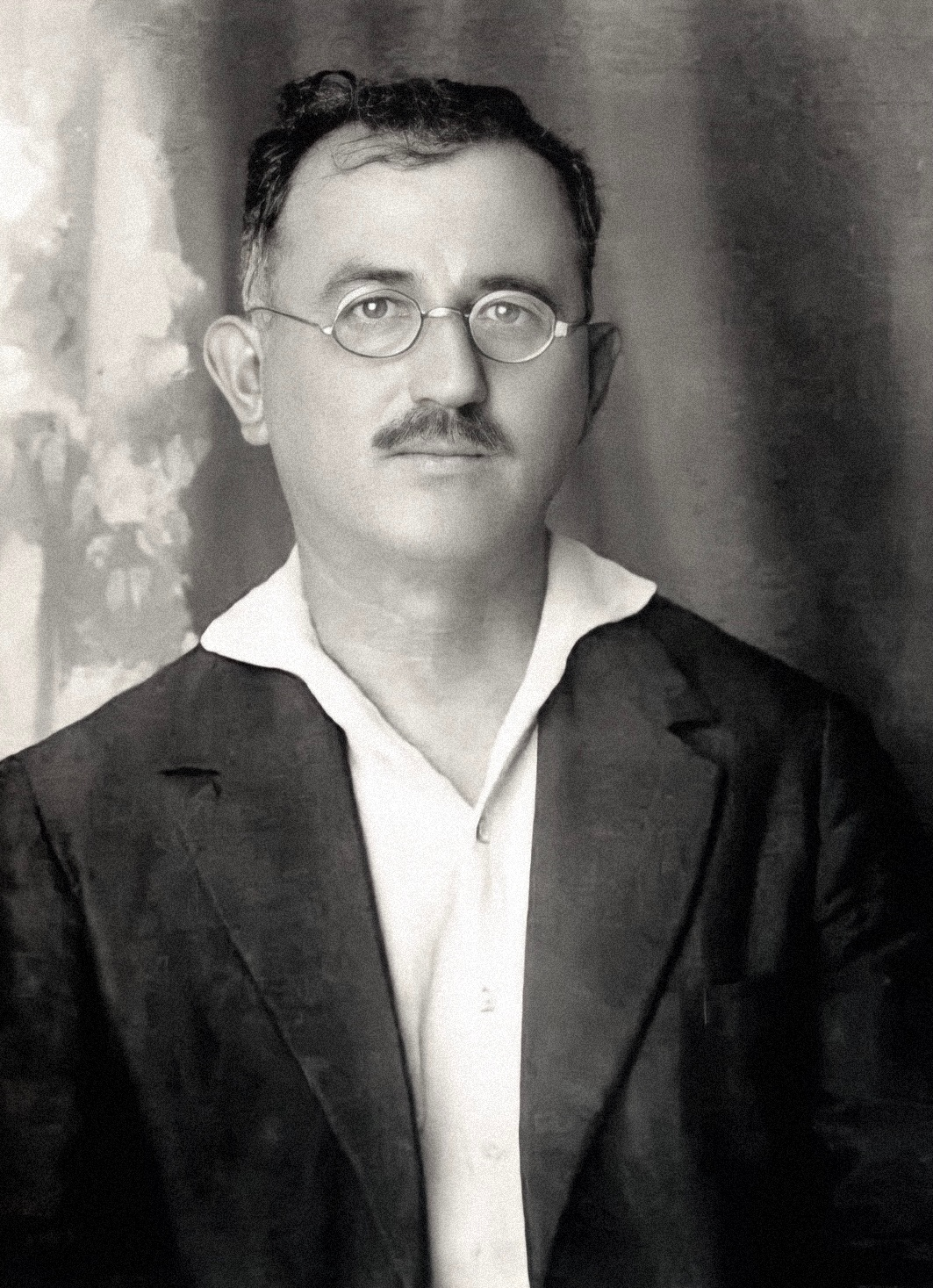
- Born: 16 August 1882; Shkodër, Ottoman Albania
- Died: 1 May 1936 (aged 53); Shkodër, Albanian Kingdom
- Occupation: Lawyer
- Known for: Activity during the Albanian National Awakening
- Notable work: Pasqyra e ditëve të përgjakshme
- Children: Llazar Siliqi (son)
- Relatives: Drago Siliqi (nephew)
- Family: Siliqi

Risto Siliqi (16 August 1882 – 1 May 1936) was an Albanian poet, publicist, lawyer, and militant of the Albanian national cause. His work was influenced by ideas and sentiments of the Romantic-Nationalism like other poets of the national Awakening before him.

== Life ==
Siliqi was born on August 16, 1882, to a modest family in Shkodër, today's Albania, back then under Ottoman rule. His father was a baker. He pursued his first education in the Serbian language school in his town, and later in Ruzdiye (Turkish middle school), where he would immediately spike out for his anti-Ottoman propaganda among the students. At a certain point he got close to being arrested, and his family sent him to Cetinje, Montenegro where three of his brothers had settled before. Siliqi did not stop his nationalist activity for the 10 years that he was in exile. Together with his brothers he opened a small hotel named "Albania" which served as meeting station for patriotic activities. He also traveled to Romania and Bulgaria to meet with the Albanian communities there.

Siliqi was an active arms-in-hand participant of the Albanian Revolt of 1911, and together with his collaborators Hil Mosi and Luigj Gurakuqi member of its leadership structure "the Albanian Committee" (Alb: Komiteti Shqiptar). He participated in the meeting of Gërçe (Gerče, today's Montenegro) and was a signatory of the Gërçe Memorandum. Meanwhile, all these events inspired him to write; many of his patriotic poems would appear in newspapers of the Albanian communities. The First Balkan War would find him in Cetinje. After being informed by Austrian intelligence that he was on the list to be arrested together with other Albanian emigre there, he left Cetinje and hid in Kotor. He and others came to Shkodër in 1913 via an Austrian ship. The Montenegrin court meanwhile condemned him to death in absentia as "enemy of the Montenegrin state".

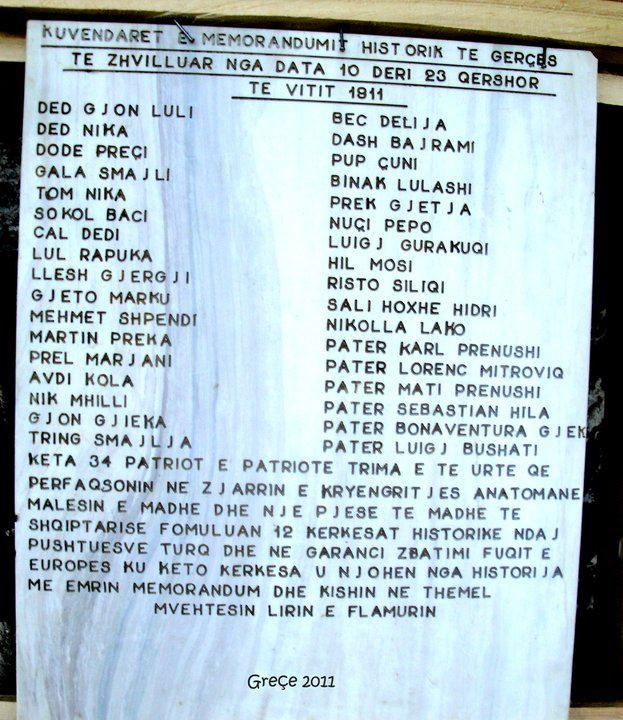
Monument in remembrance of Gërçe Memorandum in 2011, with Siliqi's name on it

The political situation in Shkodër was turbulent as well. As home of many communities supported by different European powers' interests, there were sharp contradictions and not enough support for the newly created Albanian state. Risto started working immediately on the unification of stance between Christian and Muslim communities. At that time, there were two main propagandist press-organs in Shkodër: Taraboshi of the Arberesh Terenzio Tocci, openly pro-Italian, and Seda-i Millet (Nation's Voice) of Musa Juka, pro-Turkish. At the same time, Essad Pasha Toptani had already established his area of control in central Albania, supported by the participants of the London Conference of 1912–13, and his propaganda units were also established in Shkodër. Siliqi managed to take an open stance against all of these. He was a founding member of the patriotic club "Lidhja Shqiptare" (Albanian League), and editor-in-chief of the newspaper Shqypnija e Re (New Albania), with Hil Mosi as director and Karlo Suma as treasurer. Beside the patriotic activity, the twice-a-week newspaper gave him the possibility to publish many of his creations which he could not publish as a book due to financial issues. Siliqi resigned from the "Lidhja Shqiptare" due to his disagreement on calling the Montenegrin side for military help in order to suppress the Essadist and pro-Turkish units in Shkodër. He joined the volunteer units that went to aid Prince Wied against the Muslim rebels of Haxhi Qamili. The Montenegrin invasion of Shkodër of 1914 during World War I found Siliqi there; he was immediately arrested together with Luigj Gurakuqi. speed trialed, and received a death sentence. The Austri-Hungarian offensive against Montenegro and the capitulation of the later saved his life.

On a professional point of view, Siliqi had already started practitioner as a layer. With the end of World War I, he focused his energies on the law field. The endeavors of the new Albanian state left him with a bitter disappointment. He worked as a judge in Vlorë in 1921, and in 1923 he became First Secretary of the Ministry of Justice. Nevertheless, in 1924 he resigned and returned to his home town without engaging anymore in politics from 1925. He worked as a lawyer for the rest of his life, precisely until 1 May 1936.

== Poetry ==
Siliqi completely possessed Albanian language as a language of letters after he got in touch with the work of other National Awakening poets. At the same time he started writing poetry; this was around 1900. Though his language was heavy in dialect as well as Slavic or Turkish borrowings, his poetry shows a talent in progress. Even after 1915, when his lexicology and phraseology obtained a clear Albanian language shape, his orthography remained the same.
As a metric, his first works are clearly based on the Albanian folkloric octosyllable verse style. He mostly used trochaic verses with a very few iambic. He also used 6,7,10,12,16 syllable verses, where 6 and 7 mostly in the iambs, and 6,8,10 dominate the trochees, sometimes even mixed metrics.

Siliqi finished his high school studies while in Cetinje. There he got in touch with classics as Homer, Tolstoy, and Lermontov. His first poetry was of personal nature, sometimes with notes of humor or social grief. Such were Dlirsija (Purity), Grave pa evlad (To women without children), Kënga e pijes (Booze song), Në vetmi (In solitude), etc, which show him as a disturbed romantic soul trying to live in peace only with its inner world. But the main themes for Siliqi were the patriotic ones. Filled with optimism and rage against any kind of oppression, Siliqi is clearly the poet who call for action and criticisms stagnancy and passivity. His message was clear "S'kemi c'presim nga Evropa" (we can't expect anything from Europe). The only collection of poetry Siliqi managed to publish while alive was Pasqyra e ditëve të përgjakshme (Reflection of the bloody days) published in Trieste in 1913, in 176 pages, highly influenced by his experiences of the 1910-1911 revolts. Other poetry's of his were collected from journals of the time. Similar to Asdreni, Siliqi gives social nuances to his poetry in addition to patriotic ones. His "hero" is the idealist peasant, who leaves all behind and goes to fight for his own country. During 1912-1915 he wrote many poems, in around 4,000 verses.

After World War II, there was a direct interest in collecting and publishing his work since 1945. The first collection of his selected poetry, both previously published or unpublished, came in 1956, one year after direct guidelines from the Central Committee of the Party of Labour of Albania demanding the figure of Siliqi to be studies and brought to light. It was named Risto Siliqi - Vepra te zgjedhura (Risto Siliqi - Selected works) with Dhimitër Fullani as editor, published by the Institute of History ( as part of the back then Institute of Sciences). Unlike other Rilindas he was not annihilated by the Communist regime.

== Trivia ==
Siliqi's love for poetry were passed to his son Llazar Siliqi, and nephew Drago Siliqi, both affirmed names in Albanian literature.

A street in Shkodër is named after him.

== Sources ==
- Fullani, Dhimitër (1956). Instituti i Shkencave i R.P.Sh. - Instituti i Historisë dhe Gjuhësisë (ed.). Risto Siliqi, Vepra të zgjedhura [Risto Siliqi, selected works]. Tirana: Ndermarrja Shtetërore e Botimeve. OCLC 28785865.
