= Lora Lazar =

Lora Lazar is the pen name of a contemporary Bulgarian crime writer.

== Education ==
The author graduated from the National School of Plastic Arts and the Dechko Uzunov Academy in Kazanlak before attending Sofia University, where she received a master's degree in History and Philosophy and a Postgraduate degree in Cultural Studies. In less than two years, four of her books were published in Bulgaria.

== Works ==
- In December 2011, her first novel The Cursed Goblet, appeared. The book won the national competition for crime novel or short story written "In Agatha Christie’s Footsteps", presented by the Bulgarian publisher "Era" and the website "I read".
- Released in May 2012, Lazar's second novel The Sinful Neighbourhood was published by "Iztok-Zapad" and was included in their “Magica” series.
- Her third novel was published by Trud in September, 2012, entitled Heavens of Sin.
- Released on March 4, 2013, Lora Lazar's fourth novel A Borrowed Killer was published by "Iztok-Zapad" and is also included in their “Magica” series.
- Released on October 10, 2013, Lora Lazar's latest novel, "The Merry Cemetеry", is published by "Iztok-Zapad" and is, again, included in their “Magica” series.

To date (12/2013) none of these novels have been translated into English.

== Theatre ==
Lazar also writes for the stage. Her most successful pieces include:

- A Rose on Ice, which received recognition in a competition organised by the Pleven Municipality.
- Graffiti, honored as the play which best reveals the problems of young people, at the fifth National School Theatre Festival, held in Ruse in 2010,
- Memento, which was a finalist in the Bulgarian National Playwriting Competition and was subsequently included in a special collection of plays. An English translation is available.
