= Petra Dičak =

Croatian beach handball player (born 1995)

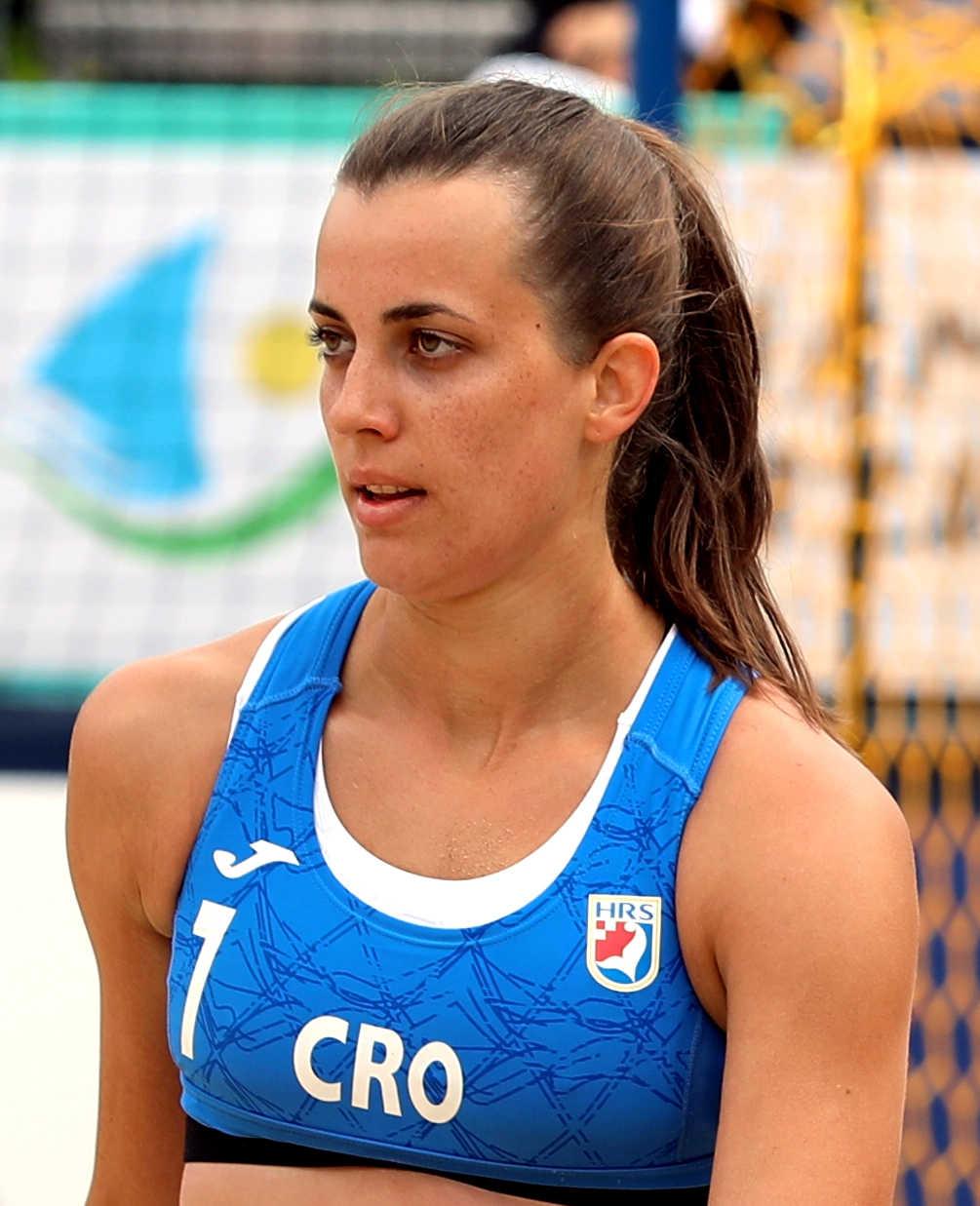
- Dičak in July 2019

Personal information
- Nationality: Croatian
- Born: 11 August 1995 (age 31) Dubrovnik, Croatia
- Height: 174 cm (5 ft 9 in)

Sport
- Sport: Handball
- Position: Right back
- Current club: ŽRK Dugo Selo '55
- Number: 77

Senior clubs
- Years: Team
- 2012–2014: ŽRK Dubrovnik
- 2014–2018: ŽRK Trešnjevka Zagreb
- 2018–2020: RK Sesvete Agroproteinka
- 2019: MHC Dubrava
- 2020–2021: Madeira Andebol SAD

Petra Dičak (born 11 August 1995) is a Croatian beach handball player who has played for the national team since 2019.

== Biography ==
Dičak was born on 11 August 1995 in Dubrovnik, Croatia. She studied chemistry at the Faculty of Science and Mathematics of the University of Zagreb.

In 2019, Dičak played with MHC Dubrava and debuted with the Croatia women's national beach handball team in 2019. With MHC Dubrava she team won the silver medal at the Moscow Grand Slam tournament, won the Croatian Championship, and placed seventh at the European Handball Federation's (EHF) 2019 Beach Handball Champions Cup.

During the 2020–21 season, Dičak played with Portuguese handball club Madeira Andebol SAD.

In 2024, Dičak played with the national team at the International Handball Federation's (IHF) 2024 Women's Beach Handball World Championships in China. As of 2025, Dičakplays for ŽRK Dugo Selo '55.
