= Tomaž Lazar =

Slovenian historian and museum curator

- Born: 1982 (age 43–44); Ljubljana, Slovenia
- Education: University of Ljubljana
- Occupations: Historian, museum curator
- Employer: National Museum of Slovenia
- Known for: Research on arms and armour, jewelry, and toys
- Title: Curator of the Department for History and Applied Art
- Awards: Valvasor Award (2012; 2017)

Tomaž Lazar is a Slovenian historian and museum curator who specializes in medieval and early-modern arms and armor. He is senior curator for arms-and-armour collections at the National Museum of Slovenia in Ljubljana and the author of several monographs, including Oklepi iz Narodnega muzeja Slovenije (2021) and its English translation Armour from the National Museum of Slovenia (2022).

== Biography ==
Lazar studied history at the University of Ljubljana from 2000 to 2005, and received his doctorate there in 2010. He joined the National Museum of Slovenia in 2008 where he is currently employed as the curator of the Department for History and Applied Art.

Between 2012 and 2014, Lazar was the lead curator of the exhibition Vitez, dama in zmaj (The Knight, the Lady and the Dragon), a comprehensive presentation of medieval warriors which earned him and his co-curators the Slovenian Museum Association's Valvasor Award of 2012.

In 2017, he organized Poti samurajev (Paths of the Samurai) in conjunction with the Embassy of Japan in Slovenia. It was the first large-scale exhibition of Japanese armor and martial culture in the country and received coverage from national media outlets such as Mladina and Delo.

Following this, Lazar curated the interdisciplinary exhibition Preteklost pod mikroskopom (The Past Under the Microscope) in 2017–18, for which he and his co-curators received 2017's Valvasor Award.

His expertise is frequently sought by Slovenian broadcasters. A 25-minute interview in the national Radio Prvi series Razkošje v glavi focused on his life and work, while Radio ARS invited him to discuss the Counts of Celje in its science program Pogled v znanost.

In addition to the two Valvasor Awards, Lazar sits on the editorial boards of the journals Kronika, Vojaška zgodovina and Argo and his work has appeared in peer-reviewed outlets.

== Selected works ==
- Lazar, Tomaž (2012). Vitezi, najemniki in smodnik: vojskovanje na Slovenskem v poznem srednjem veku. Ljubljana: Viharnik. ISBN 9789616057868.
- Lazar, Tomaž (2021). Oklepi iz Narodnega muzeja Slovenije: zaščitna oprema od visokega srednjega do zgodnjega novega veka (in Slovenian). National Museum of Slovenia. ISBN 9789616981491.
- Lazar, Tomaž (2022). Armour from the National Museum of Slovenia: Head and Body Defences from the High Middle Ages to the Early Modern Period. National Museum of Slovenia. ISBN 9789616981644.
