= Drago Siliqi =

Albanian poet, literary critic, and publicist

- Born: 9 June 1930; Tirana, Albania
- Died: 13 July 1963 (aged 33); Near Irkutsk, Soviet Union
- Resting place: Tirana, Albania
- Education: Maxim Gorky Literature Institute
- Occupations: Writer, literary critic, poet
- Spouse: Drita Siliqi (nee Shundi)
- Children: Darinë Siliqi and Laurën Siliqi (daughters)
- Relatives: Risto Siliqi (uncle), Llazar Siliqi (first cousin)
- Writing career
- Language: Albanian
- Period: 1945–1963

Drago Siliqi (9 June 1930 – 13 July 1963) was an Albanian poet, literary critic, and publisher. At the age of 14 he became a scout and then a partisan of the National Liberation Movement. He published his first collection of poetry, and then pursued university studies at the Maxim Gorky Literature Institute in Moscow.

After he returned to Albania from his studies, he became an editor and, later, a publisher and literary critic at the state owned Naim Frashëri Publishing House. There, he encouraged writers such as Ismail Kadare through his literary reviews. He also led the company to publish more translations of foreign literary works into Albanian through the hiring of affirmed writers. Siliqi died in 1963, at the age of 33, on board Aeroflot Flight 12 which crashed near Irkutsk, Soviet Union.

== Life ==
Drago Siliqi was born on June 9, 1930, in Tirana, Albania, from an Albanian family (Siliqi) originally from Shkodër. Nephew of the Albanian National Awakening activist and poet Risto Siliqi, in 1944 Drago became a scout and then a partisan of the National Liberation Movement.

His first book was published when he was 15, followed by others. He studied literature at the Maxim Gorky Literature Institute in Moscow.

After graduating, he returned to Albania and then, during 1957-1963 he worked as editor and then director of the Naim Frashëri Publishing House, where, as a literary critic, he was key into helping fully develop as writers some of the most notable post-World War II Albanian authors, such as Ismail Kadare, Dritëro Agolli, Fatos Arapi, Petro Marko, Qamil Buxheli, Dhori Qiriazi, and Vangjush Ziko. He encouraged and assisted Ismail Kadare to write The General of the Dead Army.

As a literary critic Siliqi is remembered to have rejected formalism, and Russian formalism in particular. Contrary to formalism practices, in his writings he would analyze by including a combination of his comments on both content and societal influence, as well as discourse and forms. Several authors and critics have expressed their thoughts that Siliqi's critique was deep, yet he would be always open in discussing his ideas and had a positive attitude on an entire generation of young authors to express themselves in elevated forms of art. He was also daring enough to express very positive notes on The Highland Lute, an Albanian national epic poem, by Gjergj Fishta, although the work had been banned in Albania at that time, due to anti-Slavic rhetoric.

During Siliqi's tenure the publishing house saw a boom of translations of the world's best classical literature from foreign languages into Albanian. This increase in publications was mainly due to Siliqi's work in using some of the best translators, such as Dhimitër Pasko, Lasgush Poradeci, Pashk Gjeçi, Gjon Shllaku, Vedat Kokona, Sotir Caci, Robert Shvarc, and Klio Evangjeli, many of whom were actually affirmed and retired writers. Works translated during that period included classical pieces, such as the Iliad from Homer, which had never been fully translated into Albanian, but it also included contemporary authors, such as John Galsworthy, Theodore Dreiser, Ernest Hemingway, Paul Éluard, and Erich Maria Remarque. According to Naum Prifti, an Albanian writer, Siliqi's direction in translations would always require a double standard: keeping the beauty of the original and adding beauty in the Albanian language as well.

Siliqi wrote several poems, such as “Atdheu” ("Motherland"), “Nana” ("The Mother"), “Dashunia” ("The Love"), or the philosophical one “Kangë e re për dashuninë e vjetër” ("New Song for the Old Love"), which was highly praised by critics for its theme on migration and the deep analysis of the characters. His works were collected and published several times, under the care of his wife, Drita Siliqi. Drita Siliqi his wife was the daughter of Athanas Shundi, known Albanian politician. He had two daughters with Drita, Darinë Siliqi and Laura Siliqi.

He died on July 13, 1963, flying from China to Albania, when Aeroflot Flight 12 crashed in the vicinity of the Siberian city of Irkutsk, Soviet Union. The crash killed 33 passengers and crew. Casualties included Siliqi, as well as six other Albanians.

== Literary works ==
- Anthology of the Russian-Soviet poetry (Albanian: Antologjia e poezisë ruso-sovjetike), Tiranë, Naim Frashëri, 1959.
- New song for the old love (Poem) (Albanian: Këngë e re për dashurinë e vjetër (Poemë)), Tiranë, Naim Frashëri, 1960.
- The birth of spring: poetry for teenagers (Albanian: Zgjimi i pranveres :vjersha për fëmijët e moshës së rritur shkollore). Tirana, Naim Frashëri, 1965.
- When the heart speaks: chosen poetry (Albanian: Kur zemra flet : poezi të zgjedhura). Tiranë, SHA Kartografike, 2000.
- Searching the novelty: Articles and literary studies (Albanian: Në kërkim të së resë: (artikuj e studime letrare)), Tiranë, SHA Kartografike, 2000.
