= Leonid Lazarev =

Russian photographer (1937–2021)

- Леонид Николаевич Лазарев
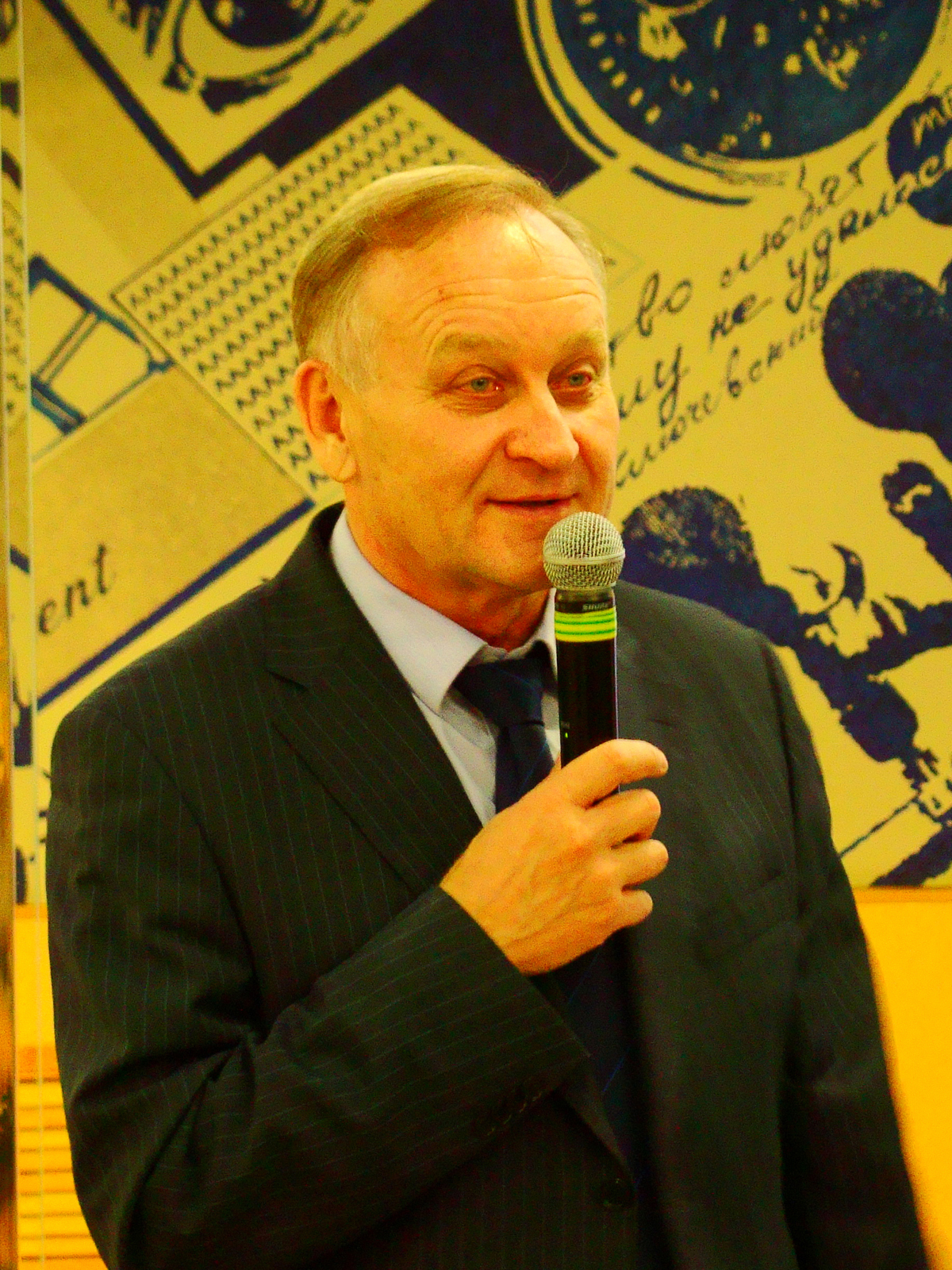
- Lazarev pictured in 2011.
- Born: July 14, 1937; Russian SFSR
- Died: May 4, 2021 (aged 83); Russia
- Occupation: Photographer

Leonid Nikolaevich Lazarev (Russian: Леонид Николаевич Лазарев; 14 July 1937 – 4 May 2021) was a Russian photographer and photojournalist. Lazarev died on 4 May 2021 in Russia, at the age of 83.

== Art Biography ==
1957 – Won the second prize in the Moscow Festival of Youth and Students photo contest.

1957–1960 – Took part in a series of photo exhibitions called "Our Youth."

1958–1963 – Worked as a photojournalist in a "Soviet Woman" magazine.

1960 – Prize-winner of a "Soviet Woman" magazine.

1961 – Prize-winner of an all-USSR photo exhibition.

1961 – Prize-winner of an all-USSR photo exhibition for the 2nd time.

1964 – Worked as a photojournalist in a "Krugozor" magazine.

1972 – Graduated from the Journalistic Mastery Institute.

1974 – Prize-winner of an international contest by the "New Time" magazine.

1977 – Graduated from the Gerasimov Institute of Cinematography, cameraman faculty.

1985 – Prize-winner of an all-USSR "40 years of Great Victory" photo exhibition.

1999 – Awarded with a Kodak-Master title.

2008 – Personal photo exhibition in a "Photo Soyuz" gallery.

2010 – Personal photo exhibition in Orens Anz art gallery in New York, USA.

2010 – Sold works to Tretyakov Gallery.

2011 – A photo exhibition of Leonid Lazarev was held in the U.S. Congress. The opening was attended by Dan Russell, Deputy assistant Secretary of state for Europe and Eurasia; Konstantin Kosachev, Chairman of the State Duma Committee on international Affairs; and Natalia Kolodzei, curator of the exhibition and Director of the Kolodzie Art Foundation.

2013 – Russian Museum exhibited Lazarev's photographs from 05.09.2013, No. 2459/2.

2013 – Opening of "Penza Arts International-2013" in The Penza Savitsky Art Gallery. Author's project "Generation."

2014 – Exhibition in the style of "Visionism" at the international exhibition "Penza Art International" in The Penza Savitsky Art Gallery.

2014 – The University of Arizona in the United States art gallery presented 18 photographs by L. Lazarev.

2015 – The Oscar Niemeyer Museum (Brazil) presented 19 photographs by L. Lazarev.

2016 – State Central Cinema Museum (Moscow) was replenished with 5 photographs by L. Lazarev, from 12.03.2015, No. 199.

2016, 21 March – The opening of a personal exhibition of L.N. Lazarev at Columbia University in the United States.

2016 – The Museum of Moscow received 47 photographs by L. N. Lazarev from 18.11.2016 No. 90.

2016 – Lazarev created a bronze sculpture called "Photographer." The sculpture was acquired by The State Historical and Memorial Museum-Reserve "Homeland of VI Lenin." Act PP-30/16.

== Photographic publications in press ==
- 1958–1963 – Soviet Woman magazine – 110 published works.
- 1962 – Photography Yearbook – 1962 (edited by Nornam Hall, GB).
- 1964–1993 – Krugozor and Kolobok magazines – 720 published works.
- 1986 – Set of large format postcards "USSR Malyi Theater."
- 1988 – Set of large format postcards "Moscow State Academic Children's Theater by the Name of N.I Satz"
- 2003 – History of Russian Customs – illustrated book.
- 2004 – Moscow in races – illustrated encyclopedic atlas.
- 2007 – History of Moscow in XII – XX centuries – illustrated book.
- 2007 – "Photo 60–70" – book series "Anthology of Russian Photography of the XX century".
- 2008 – Selected works – author's catalogue of L. N. Lazarev—publisher: I. Gorshkov.
- 2009 – "Vishva-VDNKh-VVC" – jubilee illustrated edition (4 books).
- 2009 – "Moscow – Waiting for the Future" – author's catalogue of L. N. Lazarev.
- 2010 – "Icons 1960–1980".
- 2013 — The seven-volume multimedia edition of Rasul Gamzatov's work, with photo illustrations by Leonid Lazarev. Publisher: The Russian Book Union.
- 2014 — «I Live Twice» is Leonid Lazarev's book of authorial stories. It is published by the publishing center of Ulyanovsk State University.
- 2015 — A book dedicated to the 2000th anniversary of Der Bent. Filming Staged by Leonid Lazarev.
- 2015 — «No powder and no paint», photobook by Leonid Lazarev. "Planeta" publishing house (according to the Moscow government's publishing program).
- 2017 — «Bullet for Takamura». Short stories by L. Lazarev. Publishing House "Alfa-Design."
- 2021 – Natalia Kolodzie; Road to the Stars: Recollections of the Photographer Leonid Lazarev about 14 April 1961. Leonardo 2021; 54 (1): 8–11.

== Sources ==
- Lumiere's photo gallery
