= Kim Johannesen (handballer) =

Danish handball player (born 1979)

Personal information
- Full name: Kim Johannesen
- Nationality: Danish (Denmark)
- Born: 18 July 1979 (age 47)
- Height: 192 cm (76 in)

Sport
- Sport: Handball
- Position: Left back

Senior clubs
- Years: Team
- -2006: TMS Ringsted
- 2006-2010: Viborg HK
- 2010-2014: TMS Ringsted
- 2014-?: Team HK Køge

Kim Johannesen (born 18 July 1979) is a Danish former handball player

He started his career at TMS Ringsted before joining Viborg HK in 2006. In 2007 he extended his contract until 2011, but already in 2010 he returned to TMS Ringsted.

In the winter of 2012 he was injured, but kept on playing through his injuries. In August 2013 the injury required surgery, which kept him out for more than 5 months. This prompted the club to use a clause in his contract to fire him in February 2014. Johannessen responded by taking the club to court over an unlawful dismissal. The court found that the firing was legal, except for the fact that it had happened one month too early, and the club had to pay Johannessen a compensation of 23,000 Danish Kroner. Many Danish handball players, including Henrik Møllgaard and Søren Tau spoke out against the firing. Afterwards he joined Team HK Køge in the 2. Division, the third tier of Danish handball.
