= Mateo Silić =

Croatian footballer

Mateo Silic
Personal information
- Full name: Mateo Silic
- Date of birth: 15 August 1984 (age 42)
- Place of birth: Split, Croatia
- Height: 1.83 m (6 ft 0 in)
- Position: Midfielder

Senior career*
Years	Team	Apps	(Gls)
–2005	Uskok		
2005–2006	Naftaš Ivanić	8	(0)
2007–2010	Atlantas	33+	(3+)
2011	Uskok		
2012-	Jadran KS		
- * Club domestic league appearances and goals as of 21 December 2007

Mateo Silic (born 15 August 1984) is a footballer from Split, Croatia, who played 3 1/2 seasons for FK Atlantas in Lithuania.
