= Llazar Treska =

Albanian politician and mayor

Llazar Treska was an Albanian politician and mayor of Tirana from 1944 through 1945.
