= Llazar Siliqi =

Albanian poet

- Born: 1924; Shkodër, Albania
- Died: 2001 (aged 76–77)
- Occupation: Poet
- Spouse: Henrieta Dodbiba
- Father: Risto Siliqi
- Relatives: Drago Siliqi (first cousin)
- Family: Siliqi

Llazar Siliqi (1924–2001) was an Albanian poet. His poetic profile was influenced by the work of Mayakovsky.

== Biography ==
Siliqi was born in Shkodër, the son of the Albanian poet and nationalist figure Risto Siliqi. He was first cousins with Drago Siliqi. He was an active participant of the Albanian resistance during World War II, was arrested and interned in the Nazi concentration camp in Pristina, today's Kosovo.

Siliqi was the librettist of the first Albanian opera, Mrika, composed by Prenkë Jakova, as well as Gjergj Kastrioti Skënderbeu (Scanderbeg) of 1969, an epic-heroic work written to commemorate the 500th anniversary of the death of Scanderbeg, Albania's national hero, with music from Jakova as well.

Siliqi is also known for the epic-narrative poem Prishtina (Pristina) of 1949, dedicated to the Pristina Nazi concentration camp during World War II, and for the screenplay of the movie Komisari i Dritës (Commissar of Light) of 1966.

A long time member of the League of Writers and Artists of Albania, he participated in the Orthography Congress of 1972 where the orthographic rules of the Albanian language were standardized, and was one of the signatories.

== Other works ==
- Mësuesit dhe Atit: Poezi dhe prozë shqipe kushtuar emrit të J. V. Stalinit (To the Teacher and Father: Poetry and prose dedicated to J.V.Stalin), as co-editor, Tirana: Ndërmarrja shtetërorre e botimeve, 1953.
- Mësuesi (The teacher), Tirana: Ndërmarrja shtetërorre e botimeve, 1955.
- Thirrja e zemrës (Call of heart), Tirana: Ndërmarrja shtetërorre e botimeve, 1957.
- Kangët nuk mbeten kurr të pakëndueme! (The songs never remain without being sung), Tirana: "Naim Frashëri" 1959.
- Ringjallje: poemë (Renaissance: poem), Tirana: "Naim Frashëri", 1960.
- Kangë entuziaste (Enthusiast songs), Tirana: "Naim Frashëri" 1962.
- Albanian contemporary prose, Tirana: "Naim Frashëri", 1963.
- Kalorësi i lirisë: poemë dramatike (Freedom knight: dramatic poem), Tirana: "Naim Frashëri", 1967.
- Nga porti i ri deri ku vlon malsia (From the new port to the highland glows), Tirana: "Naim Frashëri" 1967.
- Festë (Feast), Tirana: "Naim Frashëri", 1970.
- Kur zemra flet (When the heart talks), as co-editor, Tirana: "Naim Frashëri" 1970.
- Poemë për gruan shqiptare (Poem for the Albanian woman), Tirana: General Council of the Women's Union of Albania, 1972.
- Poema e dritës (Poem of light), Tirana: "Naim Frashëri" 1972.
- Heshtja që flet (Silence that talks), Pristina: Rilindja, 1972.
- Ju flet Tirana (Tirana speaking), Tirana: "Naim Frashëri" 1974.
- Poezia Shqipe (Albanian poetry), Tirana: "Naim Frashëri" 1976.
- Përpara historisë (In front of history), Tirana: "Naim Frashëri" 1979.
- Për ty zemra na këndon: antologji poetike për partinë (Our heart sings for you: poetic anthology for the Party), as co-editor, Tirana: "Naim Frashëri", 1981.
