= Lazarev (surname) =

Lazarev (Russian: Лазарев), feminine: Lazareva (Russian: Лазарева) is a Slavic surname derived from the Biblical name Lazarus. Notable people with the surname include:

- Aiaal Lazarev (born 1986), Kyrgyzstani freestyle wrestler.
- Alexander Lazarev (conductor) (born 1945), Russian conductor
- Alexander Lazarev (actor) (1938–2011), Russian actor
- Angelina Lazareva (born 1998), Russian volleyball player
- Anna Davidovna Abamelik-Lazareva (1814–1889), Russian-Armenian translator, socialite and public figure
- Anna Lazareva, Russian professional volleyball player
- Anton Lazarev (born 1990), Russian ice hockey forward
- Anton Lazarev (born 1996), Russian association football defender
- Antonina Lazareva (born 1941), Soviet high jumper
- Ekaterina Lazareva (born 1990), Russian professional footballer
- Igor Lazarev (born 1963), Russian football manager and a former player
- Ivan Lazarev – several people
- Leonid Lazarev (1937–2021), Russian photo artist and photojournalist
- Lydia Kats-Lazareva, manager of the IDSF formation team of Dance Club Mara, Belarus
- Margarita Lazareva
- Maxim Lazarev (born 1985), Russian entomologist and educator
- Mikhail Lazarev (1788–1851), Russian admiral and explorer
- Nikita Lazarev (1866–1932), Russian architect
- Pavel Lazarev (1970–2018), Soviet and Russian ice hockey player
- Polina Lazareva
- Pyotr Lazarev (1878–1942), Soviet physicist, biophysicist, geophysicist, and academician, see Eduard Shpolsky
- Sergey Lazarev (born 1983), Russian pop singer/opera actor
- Tatyana Lazareva
- Tetyana Lazareva (born 1981), Ukrainian wrestler
- Vasily Lazarev (1928–1990), Soviet cosmonaut
- Viktor Lazarev (1897–1976), Soviet art critic, see Annunciation of Ustyug
- Vladimir Lazarev (born 1964), chess Grandmaster
- Yekaterina Lazareva (born 1990), Russian professional footballer
- Yevgeni Lazarev, Russian–American actor

== See also ==
- Lazarević
