= List of flag bearers for Croatia at the Olympics =

Croatia at the Olympics
- IOC code: CRO
- NOC: Croatian Olympic Committee
- Website: www.hoo.hr (in Croatian and English)
- Medals: Gold 20 Silver 21 Bronze 18 Total 59

Summer appearances
- 1992; 1996; 2000; 2004; 2008; 2012; 2016; 2020; 2024

Winter appearances
- 1992; 1994; 1998; 2002; 2006; 2010; 2014; 2018; 2022; 2026; 2030

Other related appearances
- Austria (1900); Yugoslavia (1920–1988)

This is a list of flag bearers who have represented Croatia at the Olympics.

Flag bearers carry the national flag of their country at the opening ceremony of the Olympic Games.

| # | Event year | Season | Flag bearer | Sport |
|---|---|---|---|---|
| 1 | 1992 | Winter | Tomislav Čižmešija | Figure skating |
| 2 | 1992 | Summer | Goran Ivanišević | Tennis |
| 3 | 1994 | Winter | Vedran Pavlek | Alpine skiing |
| 4 | 1996 | Summer | Perica Bukić | Water polo |
| 5 | 1998 | Winter | Janica Kostelić | Alpine skiing |
| 6 | 2000 | Summer | Zoran Primorac | Table tennis |
| 7 | 2002 | Winter | Janica Kostelić (2) | Alpine skiing |
| 8 | 2004 | Summer | Dubravko Šimenc | Water polo |
| 9 | 2006 | Winter | Janica Kostelić (3) | Alpine skiing |
| 10 | 2008 | Summer | Ivano Balić | Handball |
| 11 | 2010 | Winter | Jakov Fak | Biathlon |
| 12 | 2012 | Summer | Venio Losert | Handball |
| 13 | 2014 | Winter | Ivica Kostelić | Alpine skiing |
| 14 | 2016 | Summer | Josip Pavić | Water polo |
| 15 | 2018 | Winter | Natko Zrnčić-Dim | Alpine skiing |
| 16 | 2020 | Summer | Sandra Perković | Discus throw |
| 16 | 2020 | Summer | Josip Glasnović | Trap |
| 17 | 2022 | Winter | Zrinka Ljutić | Alpine skiing |
| 17 | 2022 | Winter | Marko Skender | Cross-country skiing |
| 18 | 2024 | Summer | Giovanni Cernogoraz | Shooting |
| 18 | 2024 | Summer | Barbara Matić | Judo |

== See also ==
- Croatia at the Olympics
- List of flag bearers for Yugoslavia at the Olympics
