= Bobsleigh at the 2010 Winter Olympics – Four-man =

Four-man at the XXI Olympic Winter Games
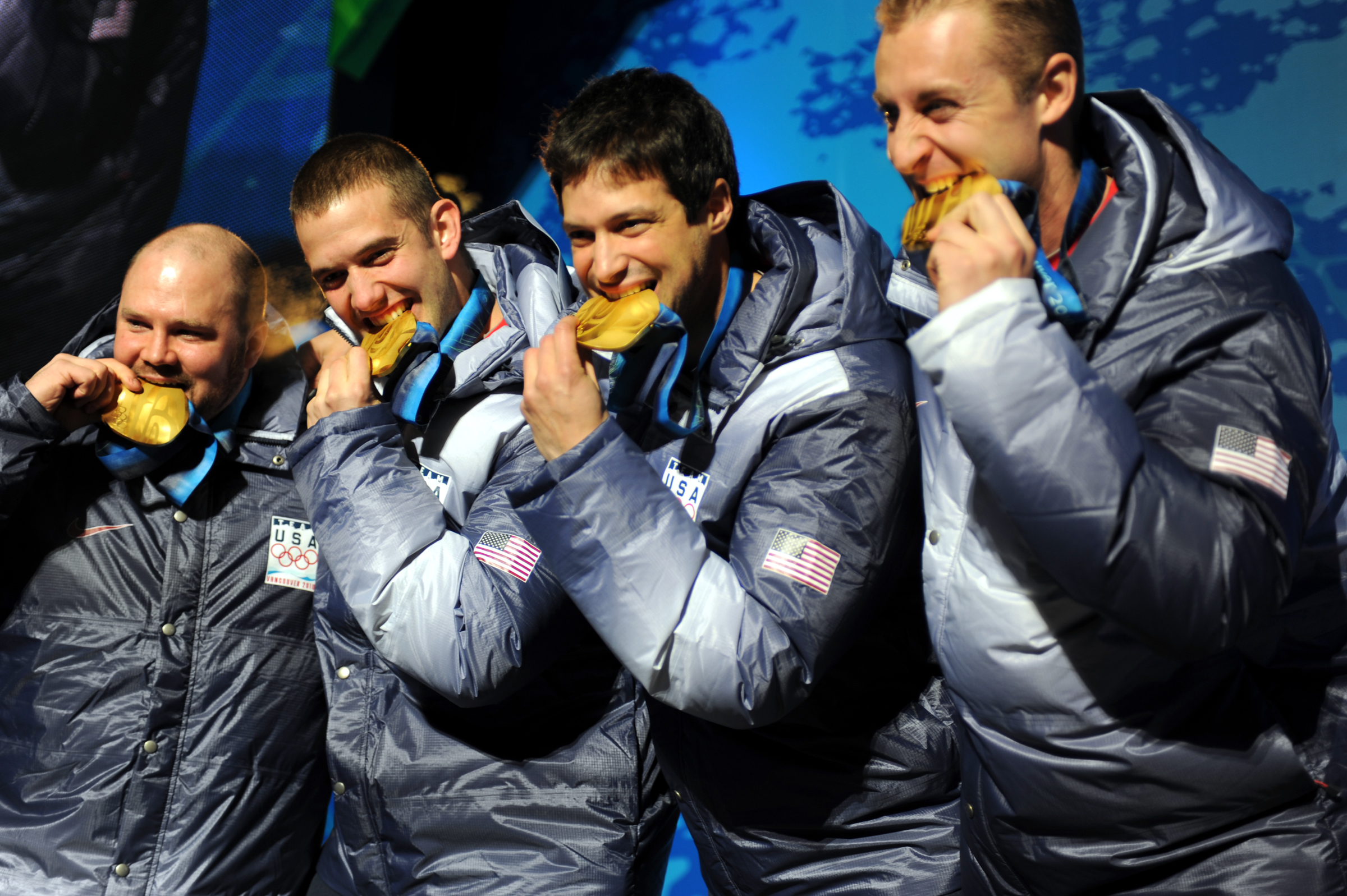
- Gold medal winners
- Venue: Whistler Sliding Centre
- Dates: 26–27 February 2010
- Competitors: 25 teams from 17 nations
- Winning time: 3:24.46

Medalists
1st place, gold medalist(s)		Steve Holcomb; Steve Mesler; Curtis Tomasevicz; Justin Olsen	United States
2nd place, silver medalist(s)		André Lange; Kevin Kuske; Alexander Rödiger; Martin Putze	Germany
3rd place, bronze medalist(s)		Lyndon Rush; David Bissett; Lascelles Brown; Chris le Bihan	Canada

The four-man bobsleigh competition at the 2010 Winter Olympics in Vancouver, British Columbia, Canada, was held at the Whistler Sliding Centre in Whistler, British Columbia, on 26–27 February.

== Background ==
The German team of André Lange, René Hoppe, Kevin Kuske, and Martin Putze were the defending Olympic champion in this event. The American team of Steve Holcomb, Justin Olsen, Steve Mesler, and Curtis Tomasevicz were the defending world champions in this event. The test event was won by the Latvian team of Jānis Miņins, Daumants Dreiškens, Oskars Melbardis, and Intars Dambis. The last World Cup event prior to the 2010 Games place took place in Igls, Austria (southeast of Innsbruck) on 24 January 2010 and was won by the German team of Lange, Hoppe, Kuske, and Putze. Holcomb of the United States won both the four-man and the combined World Cups.

== Records ==
While the IOC does not consider bobsled times eligible for Olympic records, the FIBT does maintain records for both the start and a complete run at each track it competes.

The start and track records were set at the test event for the 2010 Games on 7 February 2009.

Type	Date	Team	Time
Start	7 February 2009	United States; Steve Holcomb; Justin Olsen; Steve Mesler; Curtis Tomasevicz	4.76
Track	7 February 2009	Latvia; Jānis Miņins; Daumants Dreiškens; Oskars Melbardis; Intars Dambis	50.97

== Qualifying teams ==
On 20 January 2010, the FIBT announced that the following teams had qualified for the 2010 Games: This was finalized on 26 January 2010.

Three teams

- Germany, Russia, and United States.

Two teams

- Canada, Latvia, Switzerland, and Czech Republic.

One team

- Great Britain, Poland, Netherlands, Romania, Serbia, Italy, South Korea, Croatia, Liechtenstein, Japan, Austria, Australia, and Slovakia.

== Practice ==
Supplemental training was offered on 19 February 2010 to both the two-woman and four-man bobsleigh events out of caution and further preparation for both events that would take place the following week.

Minor changes were made to the track on 22 February 2010 after bobsleigh four-man teams from Latvia and Croatia rolled over in supplementary training. Following a meeting with 11 team captains, training runs were postponed by the FIBT until later that day to adjust the shape of turn 11 so it would be easier for sleds to get through the rest of the track without crashing. FIBT spokesman Don Krone stated that "...some drivers have been experiencing difficulties transitioning from turn 11 to turn 12." As a result, Krone stated that "The FIBT track commission, in conjunction with VANOC and with advice from a number of team captains, are working on the shape of turn 11 to make it easier for drivers to get high enough on 11 to turn 12 so that they can successfully make it through turn 13." Krone also stated that it was common that the profile of corners were changed when it was being used by other sliding disciplines (luge and skeleton).

After track alterations were done on 23 February 2010, the two fastest four-man times were done by Germany's Lange and the United States' Holcomb. Australia withdrew its four-man team on 23 February 2010 to two of its crew members, Duncan Harvey and Duncan Pugh, suffering concussions. Australia chef de mission Ian Chesterman stated that the decision was not taken lightly and was done on the side of safety. Meanwhile, Latvia's Janis Minins returned to practice on the 23rd in the wake of the emergency surgery on 12 February in the wake of an appendicitis attack. Minis withdrew from the four-man event two days later to crashing twice during practice where one of his crews suffering a concussion and another suffering bruised lungs and elbows.

Lange had the fastest practice times on the 24th with the final two practices taking place on the 25th. That same day, Australia withdrew to injuries to Harvey and Pugh of Australia while Edwin van Calker of the Netherlands withdrew due to a lack of confidence of driving the four-man sled during the event. This was also despite no crashes during four-man training had taken place prior to the 24th. The Dutch team supported van Calker's decision on this.

During practice American bobsledder Bill Schuffenhauer was detained by police on 25 February, in the wake of an argument with his fiancé, but he was later released for reasons not disclosed by Canadian authorities. Schuffenhauer competed in the four-man event for Mike Kohn's USA-3 sled. USA-3 finished 13th.

== Results ==
The first two runs took place on 26 February at 13:00 PST and 14:45 PST. On 27 February, the final two runs took place at 13:00 PST and 14:40 PST.

Defending world champion Holcomb posted the fastest track times in the first two runs while defending Olympic champion Lange had the fastest start times in the first two runs. Russia-2 driven by Zubkov, the defending four-man silver medalist and bronze medalist in the two-man event at these games, crashed out in the first run when one of his steering ropes broke. Austria-1 and Slovakia-1 also crashed out in the first run, and neither sled started the second run, nor did Russia-2. Second run crashes involved USA-2, Great Britain-1, and Japan-1. USA-2 did not participate in the 3rd run of the event. Lange, the defending Olympic champion, also had the fastest two start times in the final two runs and the fastest track time in the final run while Holcomb had the fastest track time in the third run. Rush was second after three runs, but Lange's fastest track time in the fourth heat allowed the German, with Rödiger replacing Hoppe, to beat the Canadian by 0.01 seconds to win silver. In the final race of his career, Lange did not win a gold medal in an Olympic bobsledding event. It was the first gold medal for the U.S. men in bobsleigh at the Winter Olympics since Francis Tyler's four-man win at St. Moritz in 1948.

In attendance was former NASCAR driver Geoff Bodine, 1986 Daytona 500 winner and co-founder of the Bo-Dyn Bobsled Project, who watched one of his sleds driven by Holcomb ("Night Train") win the gold medal. The first Bo-Dyn sleds debuted at the 1994 Winter Olympics in Lillehammer though it would take eight more years in Salt Lake City before the Americans medaled. Bodine expressed his satisfaction with the project prior to the start of the four-man event.

TR = Track Record. Top finish in each run is in boldface.

Rank	Bib	Country	Athletes	Run 1	Run 2	Run 3	Run 4	Total	Behind
1st place, gold medalist(s)	1	United States (USA-1)	Steve Holcomb; Steve Mesler; Curtis Tomasevicz; Justin Olsen	**50.89**-TR	**50.86**-TR	**51.19**	51.52	3:24.46	+0.00
2nd place, silver medalist(s)	2	Germany (GER-1)	André Lange; Kevin Kuske; Alexander Rödiger; Martin Putze	51.14	51.05	51.29	**51.36**	3:24.84	+0.38
3rd place, bronze medalist(s)	7	Canada (CAN-1)	Lyndon Rush; David Bissett; Lascelles Brown; Chris le Bihan	51.12	51.03	51.24	51.46	3:24.85	+0.39
4	4	Germany (GER-2)	Thomas Florschütz; Ronny Listner; Andreas Barucha; Richard Adjei	51.14	51.36	51.45	51.63	3:25.58	+1.12
5	10	Canada (CAN-2)	Pierre Lueders; Justin Kripps; Neville Wright; Jesse Lumsden	51.27	51.29	51.50	51.54	3:25.60	+1.14
6	5	Switzerland (SUI-1)	Ivo Rüegg; Thomas Lamparter; Cedric Grand; Beat Hefti	51.31	51.13	51.70	51.57	3:25.71	+1.25
7	6	Germany (GER-3)	Karl Angerer; Andreas Bredau; Alex Mann; Gregor Bermbach	51.18	51.41	51.70	51.77	3:26.06	+1.60
8	11	Russia (RUS-3)	Yevgeni Popov; Alexey Kireev; Denis Moiseychenkov; Andrey Yurkov	51.49	51.16	51.67	51.81	3:26.13	+1.67
9	19	Italy (ITA-1)	Simone Bertazzo; Danilo Santarsiero; Samuele Romanini; Mirko Turri	51.57	51.38	51.62	51.68	3:26.25	+1.79
9	8	Russia (RUS-1)	Dmitry Abramovitch; Roman Oreshnikov; Sergey Prudnikov; Dmitriy Stepushkin	51.32	51.40	51.78	51.75	3:26.25	+1.79
11	12	Latvia (LAT-2)	Edgars Maskalāns; Mihails Arhipovs; Raivis Broks; Pāvels Tulubjevs	51.60	51.42	51.85	51.78	3:26.65	+2.19
12	15	Czech Republic (CZE-1)	Ivo Danilevič; Jan Kobián; Jan Stokláska; Dominik Suchý	51.54	51.72	51.76	51.96	3:26.98	+2.52
13	13	United States (USA-3)	Mike Kohn; Nick Cunningham; Jamie Moriarty; Bill Schuffenhauer	51.69	51.42	52.10	52.11	3:27.32	+2.86
14	16	Poland (POL-1)	Dawid Kupczyk; Michał Zblewski; Paweł Mróz; Marcin Niewiara	51.94	51.96	52.35	52.28	3:28.53	+4.07
15	14	Romania (ROU-1)	Nicolae Istrate; Ioan Danut Dovalciuc; Ionut Andrei; Florin Cezar Craciun	52.05	52.00	52.34	52.50	3:28.89	+4.43
16	25	Czech Republic (CZE-2)	Jan Vrba; Martin Bohmann; Ondřej Kozlovský; Miloš Veselý	52.00	52.09	52.43	52.61	3:29.13	+4.67
17	20	Great Britain (GBR-1)	John James Jackson; Allyn Condon; Dan Money; Henry Odili Nwume	51.53	54.29	52.24	52.15	3:30.21	+5.75
18	24	Serbia (SRB-1)	Vuk Rađenović; Miloš Savić; Igor Šarcevic; Slobodan Matijević	52.37	52.40	52.84	52.74	3:30.35	+5.89
19	22	South Korea (KOR-1)	Kang Kwang-Bae; Lee Jinhee; Kim Donghyun; Kim Jung-Su	52.76	52.53	52.92	52.92	3:31.13	+6.67
20	21	Croatia (CRO-1)	Ivan Šola; Igor Marić; Slaven Krajačić; Mate Mezulić (Runs 1–2); András Haklits (Runs 3–4)	52.58	52.69	53.15	53.11	3:31.53	+7.07
21	23	Japan (JPN-1)	Hiroshi Suzuki; Ryuichi Kobayashi; Shinji Doigawa; Masaru Miyauchi	52.09	54.16	52.53		2:38.78	
	3	United States (USA-2)	John Napier; Christopher Fogt; Steven Langton; Charles Berkeley	51.30	53.41	DNS			
	9	Russia (RUS-2)	Alexandr Zubkov; Filipp Yegorov; Petr Moiseev; Dmitry Trunenkov	52.52	DNS				
	17	Austria (AUT-1)	Wolfgang Stampfer; Christian Hackl; Juergen Mayer; Johannes Wipplinger	53.64	DNS				
	18	Slovakia (SVK-1)	Milan Jagnešák; Marcel Lopuchovský; Petr Narovec; Martin Tešovič	55.25	DNS				
	-	Australia (AUS-1)	Jeremy Rolleston; Duncan Harvey; Duncan Pugh; Anthony Ryan	DNS					
	-	Latvia (LAT-1)	Jānis Miņins; Daumants Dreiškens; Oskars Melbārdis; Intars Dambis	DNS					
	-	Liechtenstein (LIE-1)	Michael Klingler; Jürgen Berginz; Thomas Dürr; Richard Wunder	DNS					
	-	Netherlands (NED-1)	Edwin van Calker; Sybren Jansma; Arnold van Calker; Timothy Beck	DNS					
	-	Switzerland (SUI-2)	Daniel Schmid; Alex Baumann; Roman Handschin; Christian Aebli	DNS					
