= Croatia at the 2006 Winter Olympics =

- IOC code: CRO
- NOC: Croatian Olympic Committee
- Website: www.hoo.hr (in Croatian and English)

in Turin
- Competitors: 22 in 6 sports
- Flag bearers: Janica Kostelić (opening); Ivan Šola (closing)
- Medals Ranked 16th: Gold 1 Silver 2 Bronze 0 Total 3

Winter Olympics appearances (overview)
- 1992; 1994; 1998; 2002; 2006; 2010; 2014; 2018; 2022; 2026

Other related appearances
- Yugoslavia (1924–1988)

Croatia competed at the 2006 Winter Olympics in Turin, Italy.

== Medalists ==
Medal	Name	Sport	Event	Date
Gold	Janica Kostelić	Alpine skiing	Women's combined	18 February
Silver	Ivica Kostelić	Alpine skiing	Men's combined	14 February
Silver	Janica Kostelić	Alpine skiing	Women's super-G	20 February

== Alpine skiing ==
Men

Athlete	Event	Final				
Athlete	Event	Run 1	Run 2	Run 3	Total	Rank
Ivica Kostelić	Super-G	n/a			1:33.53	31
Ivica Kostelić	Slalom	54.43	50.02	n/a	1:44.45	6
Ivica Kostelić	Combined	1:40.44	44.61	44.83	3:09.88	Silver medal
Danko Marinelli	Slalom	DNF				
Ivan Olivari	Super-G	—N/a			1:37.43	49
Ivan Ratkić	Super-G	—N/a			1:34.77	36
Ivan Ratkić	Giant slalom	DNF				
Ivan Ratkić	Combined	1:44.71	48.48	DNF		
Dalibor Šamšal	Slalom	DNF				
Tin Široki	Combined	1:44.75	47.40	48.01	3:20.16	26
Natko Zrnčić-Dim	Super-G	—N/a			1:34.49	35
Natko Zrnčić-Dim	Giant slalom	1:22.57	1:23.02	n/a	2:45.59	25
Natko Zrnčić-Dim	Slalom	57.69	1:01.34	n/a	1:59.03	33
Natko Zrnčić-Dim	Combined	1:41.23	56.55	46.37	3:24.15	33

Women

Athlete	Event	Final				
Athlete	Event	Run 1	Run 2	Run 3	Total	Rank
Matea Ferk	Giant slalom	DNF				
Matea Ferk	Slalom	1:06.67	DNF			
Nika Fleiss	Super-G	—N/a			1:36.65	40
Nika Fleiss	Giant slalom	1:03.27	1:10.16	n/a	2:13.43	19
Nika Fleiss	Slalom	44.31	48.30	n/a	1:32.61	23
Nika Fleiss	Combined	40.29	45.00	DNS		
Ana Jelušić	Giant slalom	1:05.19	DNF			
Ana Jelušić	Slalom	43.42	48.36	n/a	1:31.78	15
Janica Kostelić	Women's downhill	DNS				
Janica Kostelić	Super-G	—N/a			1:32.74	Silver medal
Janica Kostelić	Giant slalom	DNS				
Janica Kostelić	Slalom	43.07	46.87	n/a	1:29.94	4
Janica Kostelić	Combined	38.65	43.03	1:29.40	2:51.08	Gold medal

Note: In the men's combined, run 1 is the downhill, and runs 2 and 3 are the slalom. In the women's combined, run 1 and 2 are the slalom, and run 3 the downhill.

== Biathlon ==
Athlete	Event	Final		
Athlete	Event	Time	Misses	Rank
Petra Starčević	Women's sprint	28:11.9	2	79
Petra Starčević	Women's individual	1:06:49.6	8	79

== Bobsleigh ==
Athlete	Event	Final					
Athlete	Event	Run 1	Run 2	Run 3	Run 4	Total	Rank
Ivan Šola; Slaven Krajačić; Alek Osmanović; Jurica Grabušić	Four-man	56.67	56.57	56.51	Did not advance		23

== Cross-country skiing ==
Distance

Athlete	Event	Final	
Athlete	Event	Total	Rank
Alen Abramović	Men's 15 km classical	46:52.1	81
Damir Jurčević	Men's 15 km classical	44:20.8	70
Maja Kezele	Women's 10 km classical	35:04.2	66
Maja Kezele	Women's 15 km pursuit	51:36.3	64
Denis Klobučar	Men's 15 km classical	43:55.4	66
Denis Klobučar	Men's 30 km pursuit	1:27:16.4	64

Sprint

Athlete	Event	Qualifying		Quarterfinal		Semifinal		Final	
Athlete	Event	Total	Rank	Total	Rank	Total	Rank	Total	Rank
Alen Abramović	Men's sprint	2:34.61	75	Did not advance					75
Damir Jurčević	Men's sprint	2:28.21	60	Did not advance					60
Maja Kezele	Women's sprint	2:27.16	58	Did not advance					58
Denis Klobučar	Men's sprint	2:33.10	73	Did not advance					73
Damir Jurčević; Denis Klobučar	Men's team sprint	—N/a				19:43.1	11	Did not advance	22

== Figure skating ==
Athlete	Event	CD		SP/OD		FS/FD		Total	
Athlete	Event	Points	Rank	Points	Rank	Points	Rank	Points	Rank
Idora Hegel	Ladies'	—N/a		47.06	17	80.01	19	127.07	19

Key: CD = Compulsory Dance, FD = Free Dance, FS = Free Skate, OD = Original Dance, SP = Short Program

== Skeleton ==
Athlete	Event	Final			
Athlete	Event	Run 1	Run 2	Total	Rank
Nikola Nimac	Men's	1:01.86	1:02.44	2.04.30	26
