= Alpine skiing at the 1998 Winter Olympics – Men's giant slalom =

Men's giant slalom at the XVIII Olympic Winter Games
- Alpine skiing
- Venue: Shiga Kogen
- Date: February 19, 1998
- Competitors: 62 from 28 nations
- Winning time: 2:38.51

Medalists
1st place, gold medalist(s)		Hermann Maier	Austria
2nd place, silver medalist(s)		Stephan Eberharter	Austria
3rd place, bronze medalist(s)		Michael von Grünigen	Switzerland

The Men's giant slalom competition of the Nagano 1998 Olympics was held at Shiga Kogen.

The defending world champion was Michael von Grünigen of Switzerland, who was also the defending World Cup giant slalom champion.

== Results ==
Rank	Name	Country	Run 1	Run 2	Total	Difference
1st place, gold medalist(s)	Hermann Maier	Austria	1:20.36	1:18.15	2:38.51	-
2nd place, silver medalist(s)	Stephan Eberharter	Austria	1:20.94	1:18.42	2:39.36	+0.85
3rd place, bronze medalist(s)	Michael von Grünigen	Switzerland	1:20.98	1:18.71	2:39.69	+1.18
4	Hans Knauss	Austria	1:21.16	1:18.55	2:39.71	+1.20
5	Jure Košir	Slovenia	1:20.97	1:19.01	2:39.98	+1.47
6	Steve Locher	Switzerland	1:21.98	1:18.32	2:40.30	+1.79
7	Paul Accola	Switzerland	1:21.31	1:19.26	2:40.57	+2.06
8	Lasse Kjus	Norway	1:21.92	1:18.73	2:40.65	+2.14
9	Christian Mayer	Austria	1:20.84	1:19.83	2:40.67	+2.16
10	Fredrik Nyberg	Sweden	1:22.32	1:18.63	2:40.95	+2.44
11	Ian Piccard	France	1:22.08	1:19.02	2:41.10	+2.59
12	Urs Kälin	Switzerland	1:22.00	1:19.17	2:41.17	+2.66
13	Christophe Saioni	France	1:21.84	1:19.40	2:41.24	+2.73
14	Marco Büchel	Liechtenstein	1:22.52	1:19.47	2:41.99	+3.48
15	Matteo Nana	Italy	1:22.43	1:19.94	2:42.37	+3.86
16	Sergio Bergamelli	Italy	1:22.38	1:20.40	2:42.78	+4.27
17	Tom Stiansen	Norway	1:21.40	1:21.48	2:42.88	+4.37
18	Mitja Kunc	Slovenia	1:22.66	1:20.43	2:43.09	+4.58
19	Sami Uotila	Finland	1:23.43	1:20.02	2:43.45	+4.94
20	Daron Rahlves	United States	1:22.81	1:20.78	2:43.59	+5.08
21	Patrik Järbyn	Sweden	1:23.19	1:20.63	2:43.82	+5.31
22	Jernej Koblar	Slovenia	1:23.49	1:20.47	2:43.96	+5.45
23	Thomas Lödler	Croatia	1:23.26	1:20.95	2:44.21	+5.70
24	Andrzej Bachleda-Curuś	Poland	1:24.17	1:22.07	2:46.24	+7.73
25	Kiminobu Kimura	Japan	1:25.02	1:21.33	2:46.35	+7.84
26	Sacha Gros	United States	1:24.57	1:22.32	2:46.89	+8.38
27	Tejs Broberg	Denmark	1:25.14	1:22.00	2:47.14	+8.63
28	Vedran Pavlek	Croatia	1:25.61	1:21.93	2:47.54	+9.03
29	Marcel Maxa	Czech Republic	1:25.88	1:23.63	2:49.51	+11.00
29	Takuya Ishioka	Japan	1:26.16	1:23.35	2:49.51	+11.00
31	Alain Baxter	Great Britain	1:26.29	1:23.53	2:49.82	+11.31
32	Stefan Georgiev	Bulgaria	1:27.76	1:23.13	2:50.89	+12.38
33	Hur Seung-Wook	South Korea	1:27.87	1:24.40	2:52.27	+13.76
34	Ivars Ciaguns	Latvia	1:28.52	1:25.07	2:53.59	+15.08
35	Marko Đorđević	FR Yugoslavia	1:30.34	1:28.13	2:58.47	+19.96
36	Aleksandar Stojanovski	Macedonia	1:31.83	1:29.34	3:01.17	+22.66
-	Joël Chenal	France	1:22.05	DQ	-	-
-	Patrick Holzer	Italy	1:22.39	DNF	-	-
-	Markus Eberle	Germany	1:24.01	DNF	-	-
-	Kalle Palander	Finland	1:24.02	DNF	-	-
-	Victor Gómez	Andorra	1:25.07	DNF	-	-
-	Gerard Escoda	Andorra	1:25.23	DNF	-	-
-	Kristinn Björnsson	Iceland	1:25.47	DNS	-	-
-	Enis Bećirbegović	Bosnia and Herzegovina	1:26.15	DNF	-	-
-	Dmitry Kvach	Kazakhstan	1:29.95	DNF	-	-
-	Bode Miller	United States	1:56.98	DNF	-	-
-	Kjetil André Aamodt	Norway	DNF	-	-	-
-	Alberto Tomba	Italy	DNF	-	-	-
-	Harald Christian Strand Nilsen	Norway	DNF	-	-	-
-	Bernhard Knauss	Slovenia	DNF	-	-	-
-	Achim Vogt	Liechtenstein	DNF	-	-	-
-	Casey Puckett	United States	DNF	-	-	-
-	Martin Hansson	Sweden	DNF	-	-	-
-	Andrey Filichkin	Russia	DNF	-	-	-
-	Kentaro Minagawa	Japan	DNF	-	-	-
-	Mika Marila	Finland	DNF	-	-	-
-	Vasily Bezsmelnitsyn	Russia	DNF	-	-	-
-	Renato Gašpar	Croatia	DNF	-	-	-
-	Haukur Arnórsson	Iceland	DNF	-	-	-
-	Byun Jong-moon	South Korea	DNF	-	-	-
-	Lyubomir Popov	Bulgaria	DNF	-	-	-
-	Thomas Grandi	Canada	DQ	-	-	-
