= Alpine skiing at the 1998 Winter Olympics – Men's super-G =

Men's super-G at the XVIII Olympic Winter Games
- Alpine skiing
- Venue: Hakuba
- Date: February 16, 1998
- Competitors: 45 from 22 nations
- Winning time: 1:34.82

Medalists
1st place, gold medalist(s)		Hermann Maier	Austria
2nd place, silver medalist(s)		Hans Knauss	Austria
2nd place, silver medalist(s)		Didier Cuche	Switzerland

Men's super-G
- Location: Hakuba – Happo-One; Olympic Course I
- Vertical: 650 m (2,133 ft)
- Top elevation: 1,490 m (4,888 ft)
- Base elevation: 840 m (2,756 ft)

The men's super-G competition of the Nagano 1998 Olympics was held at Hakuba on Monday, February 16.

The defending world champion was Atle Skardal of Norway, France's Luc Alphand was the defending World Cup Super G champion, and Markus Wasmeier of Germany was the defending Olympic champion; all three had since retired from competition.

Just three days after a spectacular crash in the downhill, Austria's Hermann Maier returned to win the gold medal, and teammate Hans Knauss tied for the silver with Didier Cuche of Switzerland.

The course started at an elevation of 1,490 m (4,888 ft) above sea level with a vertical drop of 650 m (2,133 ft) and a course length of 2.407 km (1.50 mi). Maier's winning time of 94.82 seconds yielded an average course speed of 91.386 km/h (56.8 mph), with an average vertical descent rate of 6.855 m/s (22.5 ft/s).

== Results ==
The race was started at 08:45 local time, (UTC +9). At the starting gate, the skies were clear, the temperature was −3.2 °C (26.2 °F), and the snow condition was hard; the temperature at the finish at −2.5 °C (27.5 °F).

Rank	Bib	Name	Country	Time	Difference
1st place, gold medalist(s)	8	Hermann Maier	Austria	1:34.82	—
2nd place, silver medalist(s)	17	Hans Knauss	Austria	1:35.43	+0.61
2nd place, silver medalist(s)	6	Didier Cuche	Switzerland	1:35.43	+0.61
4	24	Alessandro Fattori	Italy	1:35.61	+0.79
5	15	Kjetil André Aamodt	Norway	1:35.67	+0.85
6	13	Patrik Järbyn	Sweden	1:35.72	+0.90
7	11	Daron Rahlves	United States	1:35.96	+1.14
8	22	Tommy Moe	United States	1:35.97	+1.15
9	5	Lasse Kjus	Norway	1:36.25	+1.43
10	14	Fredrik Nyberg	Sweden	1:36.31	+1.49
11	16	Bruno Kernen	Switzerland	1:36.37	+1.55
12	36	Brian Stemmle	Canada	1:36.40	+1.58
13	25	Kyle Rasmussen	United States	1:36.52	+1.70
14	12	Steve Locher	Switzerland	1:36.62	+1.80
15	3	Werner Perathoner	Italy	1:36.64	+1.82
16	9	Kristian Ghedina	Italy	1:36.70	+1.88
17	30	Jernej Koblar	Slovenia	1:36.84	+2.02
18	2	Paul Accola	Switzerland	1:36.87	+2.05
19	10	Peter Runggaldier	Italy	1:37.00	+2.18
19	4	Andreas Schifferer	Austria	1:37.00	+2.18
21	28	Andrey Filichkin	Russia	1:37.29	+2.47
22	32	Enis Bećirbegović	Bosnia and Herzegovina	1:37.58	+2.76
23	18	Peter Pen	Slovenia	1:37.81	+2.99
24	33	Tsuyoshi Tomii	Japan	1:37.86	+3.04
25	1	Jean-Luc Crétier	France	1:37.95	+3.13
26	26	Jürgen Hasler	Liechtenstein	1:38.32	+3.50
27	31	Yasuyuki Takishita	Japan	1:38.39	+3.57
28	27	Aleš Brezavšček	Slovenia	1:38.54	+3.72
29	38	Vasily Bezsmelnitsyn	Russia	1:39.39	+4.57
30	37	Vedran Pavlek	Croatia	1:39.63	+4.81
31	39	Graham Bell	Great Britain	1:39.80	+4.98
32	40	Renato Gašpar	Croatia	1:39.85	+5.03
33	35	Andrew Freshwater	Great Britain	1:39.89	+5.07
34	29	Chad Fleischer	United States	1:40.19	+5.37
35	42	Tejs Broberg	Denmark	1:41.09	+6.27
36	45	Igor Yudin	Belarus	1:45.92	+11.10
37	47	Marcelo Apovian	Brazil	1:49.43	+14.61
	20	Frédéric Marin-Cudraz	France	DNF	
	41	Thomás Grob	Chile	DNF	
	43	Zurab Dzhidzhishvili	Georgia	DNF	
	44	Victor Gómez	Andorra	DNF	
	46	Alex Heath	South Africa	DNF	
	7	Stephan Eberharter	Austria	DSQ	
	27	Nicolas Burtin	France	DSQ	
	23	Ed Podivinsky	Canada	DSQ	
	19	Adrien Duvillard	France	DNS	
	34	Thomas Lödler	Croatia	DNS	
