= Croatia at the 1998 Winter Olympics =

- IOC code: CRO
- NOC: Croatian Olympic Committee
- Website: www.hoo.hr (in Croatian and English)

in Nagano
- Competitors: 6 (4 men, 2 women) in 3 sports
- Flag bearer: Janica Kostelić
- Medals: Gold 0 Silver 0 Bronze 0 Total 0

Winter Olympics appearances (overview)
- 1992; 1994; 1998; 2002; 2006; 2010; 2014; 2018; 2022; 2026

Other related appearances
- Yugoslavia (1924–1988)

Croatia was represented at the 1998 Winter Olympics in Nagano, Japan by the Croatian Olympic Committee.

In total, six athletes including four men and two women represented Croatia in three different sports including alpine skiing, cross-country skiing and figure skating.

== Competitors ==
In total, six athletes represented Croatia at the 1998 Winter Olympics in Nagano, Japan across three different sports.

Sport	Men	Women	Total
Alpine skiing	3	1	4
Cross-country skiing	1	0	1
Figure skating	0	1	1
Total	4	2	6

== Alpine skiing ==
In total, four Croatian athletes participated in the alpine skiing events – Renato Gašpar, Janica Kostelić, Thomas Lödler and Vedran Pavlek.

The women's super-G was due to take place on 10 February 1998 but was postponed due to heavy snow and instead took place on 11 February 1998. Kostelić completed the course in a time of one minute 19.77 seconds to finish 26th overall.

The women's downhill was due to take place on 14 February 1998 but was postponed twice due to the weather and instead took place on 16 February 1998. Kostelić completed the course in a time of one minute 31.97 seconds to finish 25th overall.

The women's combined took place on 16 and 17 February 1998. Kostelić completed her downhill run in a time of one minute 31.71 seconds and her first slalom run in a time of 37.35 seconds. She completed her second slalom run in a time of 36.17 seconds for a total time of two minutes 45.23 seconds to finish eighth overall.

The men's super-G took place on 16 February 1998. Pavlek completed the course in a time of one minute 39.63 seconds to finish 30th overall. Gašpar completed the course in a time of one minute 39.85 seconds to finish 32nd overall. Lodler did not start

The men's giant slalom was due to take place on 18 February 1998 but was postponed due to heavy snow and instead took place on 19 February 1998. Lodler completed his first run in a time of one minute 23.26 seconds. He completed his second run in a time of one minute 20.95 seconds for a total time of two minutes 44.21 seconds to finish 23rd overall. Pavlek completed his first run in a time of one minute 25.61 seconds. He completed his second run in a time of one minute 21.93 seconds for a total time of two minutes 47.54 seconds to finish 28th overall. Gašpar did not finish his first run and did not take part in the second run.

The women's slalom took place on 19 February 1998. Kostelić did not finish her first run and did not take part in the second run.

The women's giant slalom took place on 20 February 1998. Kostelić completed her first run in a time of one minute 23.45 seconds. She completed her second run in a time of one minute 35.94 seconds for a total time of two minutes 59.39 seconds to finish 24th overall.

The men's slalom took place on 21 February 1998. Lodler completed his first run in a time of 57.91 seconds. He did not finish his second run.

Athlete	Event	Run 1 (DH)		Run 2 (Sl)		Run 3 (Sl)		Final/Total		
Athlete	Event	Time	Rank	Time	Rank	Time	Rank	Time	Diff	Rank
Renato Gašpar	Men's super-G	—						1:39.85	+5.03	32
Renato Gašpar	Men's giant slalom	—		Did not finish						
Vedran Pavlek	Men's super-G	—						1:39.63	+4.81	30
Vedran Pavlek	Men's giant slalom	—		1:25.61	35	1:21.93	25	2:47.54	+9.03	28
Thomas Lödler	Men's giant slalom	—		1:23.26	23	1:20.95	22	2:44.21	+5.70	23
Thomas Lödler	Men's slalom	—		57.91	26	Did not finish				
Janica Kostelić	Women's downhill	—						1:31.97	+2.08	25
Janica Kostelić	Women's super-G	—						1:19.77	+1.75	26
Janica Kostelić	Women's giant slalom	—		1:23.45	25	1:35.94	22	2:59.39	+8.80	24
Janica Kostelić	Women's slalom	—		Did not finish						
Janica Kostelić	Women's combined	1:31.71	18	37.35	10	36.17	9	2:45.23	+4.49	8

== Cross-country skiing ==
In total, one Croatian athlete participated in the cross-country skiing events – Antonio Rački in the men's 10 km classical.

The men's 10 km classical took place on 12 February 1998. Rački did not finish.

Athlete	Event	Race	
Athlete	Event	Time	Rank
Antonio Rački	10 km classical	Did not finish	

== Figure skating ==
In total, one Croatian athlete participated in the figure skating events – Ivana Jakupčević in the women's singles.

The women's singles took place on 18 and 20 February 1998. Jakupčević was ranked 25th in the short programme and did not advance to the free skate.

Athlete(s)	Event	CD1	CD2	SP/OD	FS/FD	Total	
Athlete(s)	Event	FP	FP	FP	FP	TFP	Rank
Ivana Jakupčević	Women's	—		25	Did not advance		
