= Croatia at the 1992 Winter Olympics =

- IOC code: CRO
- NOC: Croatian Olympic Committee
- Website: www.hoo.hr (in Croatian and English)

in Albertville
- Competitors: 4 in 3 sports
- Flag bearer: Tomislav Čižmešija
- Medals: Gold 0 Silver 0 Bronze 0 Total 0

Winter Olympics appearances (overview)
- 1992; 1994; 1998; 2002; 2006; 2010; 2014; 2018; 2022; 2026

Other related appearances
- Yugoslavia (1924–1988)

Croatia participated at the 1992 Winter Olympics in Albertville, France, held between 8 and 23 February 1992. The country's participation in the Games marked its first appearance at the Winter Olympics after its independence from Yugoslavia.

The Croatian team consisted of four athletes who competed across three sports. Skater Tomislav Čižmešija was the country's flag-bearer during the opening ceremony. The country did not win any medal in the Games.

== Background ==
Prior to 1991, Croatian athletes competed as a part of Yugoslavia. The National Olympic Committee of independent Croatia was formed in 1991 and was provisionally recognized by the International Olympic Committee (IOC) in 1992. The Croatian Olympic Committee gained full recognition on 24 September 1993. The Games marked the nation's debut in the Winter Olympics.

The 1992 Winter Olympics were held in Albertville, France between 8 and 23 February 1992. Skater Tomislav Čižmešija was the country's flag-bearer in the Parade of Nations during the opening ceremony.

== Competitors ==
The Croatian delegation consisted of four athletes competing across three sports.

Sport	Men	Women	Total
Alpine skiing	1	0	1
Cross-country skiing	1	0	1
Figure skating	1	1	2
Total	3	1	4

== Alpine skiing ==
Alpine skiing at the 1992 Winter Olympics took place at Val d’Isère and Les Menuires. Vedran Pavlek was the lone competitor for Croatia, and competed in three events. He finished 36th in the Slalom event while failing to register a finish in the other two events.

Men

Athlete	Event	First Run		Second Run		Final	
Athlete	Event	Time	Rank	Time	Rank	Time	Rank
Vedran Pavlek	Super-G	—N/a				Did not finish	
Vedran Pavlek	Giant slalom	Did not finish		—N/a		Did not finish	
Vedran Pavlek	Slalom	58.75	44	58.53	36	1:57.28	36

== Cross-country skiing ==
Cross-country skiing events were held between 9 and 22 February at Les Saisies. Siniša Vukonić was the lone competitor for the nation, and competed in three events. He achieved a best place finish of 60th in the Men's 50 km freestyle event.

Men

Athlete	Event	Race	
Athlete	Event	Time	Rank
Siniša Vukonić	10 km classical	34:01.1	75
Siniša Vukonić	15 km freestyle pursuit	48:45.5	69
Siniša Vukonić	50 km freestyle	2:28:19.4	60

== Figure skating ==
Figure skating events were held at La halle de glace Olympique. Tomislav Čižmešija and Željka Čižmešija participated in the men's singles and women's singles categories. Both of them were eliminated in the first round and did not advance to the free skate round.

Athlete	Event	Short program	Free skating	Final
Tomislav Čižmešija	Men's singles	29	Did not advance	
Željka Čižmešija	Ladies' singles	25	Did not advance	

== See also ==
- Slovenia at the 1992 Winter Olympics
- Yugoslavia at the 1992 Winter Olympics
