= Croatia at the Olympics =

- IOC code: CRO
- NOC: Croatian Olympic Committee
- Website: www.hoo.hr (in Croatian and English)
- Medals Ranked 47th: Gold 20 Silver 21 Bronze 19 Total 60

Summer appearances
- 1992; 1996; 2000; 2004; 2008; 2012; 2016; 2020; 2024; 2028

Winter appearances
- 1992; 1994; 1998; 2002; 2006; 2010; 2014; 2018; 2022; 2026

Other related appearances
- Austria (1900); Yugoslavia (1920–1988)

Croatia competed at the Olympic Games for the first time as an independent nation in 1992, and has participated in every Games since then.

The National Olympic Committee for Croatia is the Croatian Olympic Committee, which was created in 1991 and recognized in 1993.

Croatian athletes made their Olympic debut as part of the Austro-Hungarian Empire at the 1900 Summer Olympics in Paris, where fencer Milan Neralić, born in what is now Croatia, represented Austria and secured a bronze medal in the men's masters sabre event. This marked the first Olympic medal for a Croatian athlete, though official records attribute it to Austria. From 1920 to 1988 Croatian athletes participated as part of Yugoslavia before gaining independence.

Croatian athletes have won forty-seven medals at the Summer Olympic Games, including multiple gold medals by the rowers Martin Sinković and Valent Sinković in 2016, 2020, and 2024; men's handball team in 1996 and 2004, as well as discus-thrower Sandra Elkasević in 2012, 2016 and 2024. At the Winter Olympic Games, Janica Kostelić won six medals (four gold) between 2002 and 2006, her brother Ivica won four silver medals (in 2006, 2010 and 2014), and Jakov Fak won a bronze in 2010.

== Medal tables ==
=== Medals by Summer Games ===
Games	Athletes	Gold	Silver	Bronze	Total	Rank
(French Third Republic) 1900 Paris	as part of Austria					
1904–1912	did not participate					
1920–1988	as part of Yugoslavia					
(Spain) 1992 Barcelona	39	0	1	2	3	44
(United States) 1996 Atlanta	84	1	1	0	2	45
(Australia) 2000 Sydney	88	1	0	1	2	49
(Greece) 2004 Athens	81	1	2	2	5	44
(China) 2008 Beijing	105	0	2	3	5	59
(United Kingdom) 2012 London	110	3	1	2	6	26
(Brazil) 2016 Rio de Janeiro	87	5	3	2	10	17
(Japan) 2020 Tokyo	60	3	3	3	9	26
(France) 2024 Paris	73	2	2	3	7	30
(United States) 2028 Los Angeles	future event					
(Australia) 2032 Brisbane	future event					
Total (9/30)	727	16	15	18	49	48

=== Medals by Winter Games ===
Games	Athletes	Gold	Silver	Bronze	Total	Rank
1924–1988	as part of Yugoslavia					
(France) 1992 Albertville	4	0	0	0	0	–
(Norway) 1994 Lillehammer	3	0	0	0	0	–
(Japan) 1998 Nagano	6	0	0	0	0	–
(United States) 2002 Salt Lake City	14	3	1	0	4	12
(Italy) 2006 Turin	22	1	2	0	3	16
(Canada) 2010 Vancouver	19	0	2	1	3	21
(Russia) 2014 Sochi	11	0	1	0	1	25
(South Korea) 2018 Pyeongchang	19	0	0	0	0	–
(China) 2022 Beijing	11	0	0	0	0	–
(Italy) 2026 Milano Cortina	14	0	0	0	0	–
(France) 2030 French Alps	future event					
(United States) 2034 Utah	future event					
Total (10/25)	123	4	6	1	11	28

=== Medals by summer sport ===
Sport	Gold	Silver	Bronze	Total
Rowing	3	3	2	8
Athletics	3	1	2	6
Shooting	2	0	2	4
Handball	2	0	1	3
Water polo	1	3	0	4
Tennis	1	2	3	6
Sailing	1	2	0	3
Taekwondo	1	0	5	6
Weightlifting	1	0	1	2
Judo	1	0	0	1
Gymnastics	0	2	0	2
Basketball	0	1	0	1
Swimming	0	1	0	1
Boxing	0	0	1	1
Wrestling	0	0	1	1
Totals (15 entries)	16	15	18	49

=== Medals by winter sport ===
Sport	Gold	Silver	Bronze	Total
Alpine skiing	4	6	0	10
Biathlon	0	0	1	1
Totals (2 entries)	4	6	1	11

== List of medalists ==
=== Summer Olympics ===
Medal	Name(s)	Games	Sport	Event	Date
Silver	Men's basketball team: Dražen Petrović Velimir Perasović Danko Cvjetičanin Toni Kukoč Vladan Alanović Franjo Arapović Žan Tabak Stojko Vranković Alan Gregov Arijan Komazec Dino Rađa Aramis Naglić (Team coached by Petar Skansi)	(Spain) 1992 Barcelona	Basketball	Men's tournament	6 August 1992
Bronze	Goran Ivanišević; Goran Prpić	(Spain) 1992 Barcelona	Tennis	Men's doubles	5 August 1992
Bronze	Goran Ivanišević	(Spain) 1992 Barcelona	Tennis	Men's singles	6 August 1992
Gold	Men's handball team: Patrik Ćavar Valner Franković Slavko Goluža Bruno Gudelj Vladimir Jelčić Božidar Jović Nenad Kljaić Venio Losert Valter Matošević Zoran Mikulić Alvaro Načinović Goran Perkovac Iztok Puc Zlatko Saračević Irfan Smajlagić Vladimir Šuster (Team coached by Velimir Kljaić)	(United States) 1996 Atlanta	Handball	Men's tournament	4 August 1996
Silver	Men's water polo team: Maro Balić Perica Bukić Damir Glavan Igor Hinić Vjekoslav Kobešćak Joško Kreković Ognjen Kržić Dubravko Šimenc Siniša Školneković Ratko Štritof Renato Vrbičić Tino Vegar Zdeslav Vrdoljak (Team coached by Bruno Silić)	(United States) 1996 Atlanta	Water polo	Men's tournament	28 July 1996
Gold	Nikolaj Pešalov	(Australia) 2000 Sydney	Weightlifting	Men's 62 kg	17 September 2000
Bronze	Igor Francetić; Tihomir Franković; Tomislav Smoljanović; Nikša Skelin; Siniša Skelin; Krešimir Čuljak; Igor Boraska; Branimir Vujević; Silvijo Petriško (cox)	(Australia) 2000 Sydney	Rowing	Men's eight	24 September 2000
Gold	Men's handball team: Venio Losert Vlado Šola Valter Matošević Nikša Kaleb Ivano Balić Blaženko Lacković Vedran Zrnić Igor Vori Davor Dominiković Mirza Džomba Drago Vuković Slavko Goluža Goran Šprem Denis Špoljarić Petar Metličić (Team coached by Lino Červar)	(Greece) 2004 Athens	Handball	Men's tournament	29 August 2004
Silver	Nikša Skelin; Siniša Skelin	(Greece) 2004 Athens	Rowing	Men's coxless pair	21 August 2004
Silver	Duje Draganja	(Greece) 2004 Athens	Swimming	Men's 50 metre freestyle	20 August 2004
Bronze	Mario Ančić; Ivan Ljubičić	(Greece) 2004 Athens	Tennis	Men's doubles	20 August 2004
Bronze	Nikolaj Pešalov	(Greece) 2004 Athens	Weightlifting	Men's 69 kg	18 August 2004
Silver	Blanka Vlašić	(China) 2008 Beijing	Athletics	Women's high jump	23 August 2008
Silver	Filip Ude	(China) 2008 Beijing	Gymnastics	Men's pommel horse	17 August 2008
Bronze	Snježana Pejčić	(China) 2008 Beijing	Shooting	Women's 10 metre air rifle	9 August 2008
Bronze	Martina Zubčić	(China) 2008 Beijing	Taekwondo	Women's 57 kg	21 August 2008
Bronze	Sandra Šarić	(China) 2008 Beijing	Taekwondo	Women's 67 kg	22 August 2008
Gold	Sandra Perković	(United Kingdom) 2012 London	Athletics	Women's discus throw	4 August 2012
Gold	Giovanni Cernogoraz	(United Kingdom) 2012 London	Shooting	Men's trap	6 August 2012
Gold	Men's water polo team: Josip Pavić Damir Burić Miho Bošković Nikša Dobud Maro Joković Petar Muslim Ivan Buljubašić Andro Bušlje Sandro Sukno Samir Barač Igor Hinić Paulo Obradović Frano Vićan (Team coached by Ratko Rudić)	(United Kingdom) 2012 London	Water polo	Men's tournament	12 August 2012
Silver	David Šain; Martin Sinković; Damir Martin; Valent Sinković	(United Kingdom) 2012 London	Rowing	Men's quadruple sculls	3 August 2012
Bronze	Lucija Zaninović	(United Kingdom) 2012 London	Taekwondo	Women's 49 kg	8 August 2012
Bronze	Men's handball team: Venio Losert Ivano Balić Domagoj Duvnjak Blaženko Lacković Marko Kopljar Igor Vori Jakov Gojun Zlatko Horvat Drago Vuković Damir Bičanić Denis Buntić Mirko Alilović Manuel Štrlek Ivan Čupić Ivan Ninčević (Team coached by Slavko Goluža)	(United Kingdom) 2012 London	Handball	Men's tournament	12 August 2012
Gold	Josip Glasnović	(Brazil) 2016 Rio de Janeiro	Shooting	Men's trap	8 August 2016
Gold	Martin Sinković; Valent Sinković	(Brazil) 2016 Rio de Janeiro	Rowing	Men's double sculls	11 August 2016
Gold	Sandra Perković	(Brazil) 2016 Rio de Janeiro	Athletics	Women's discus throw	16 August 2016
Gold	Šime Fantela; Igor Marenić	(Brazil) 2016 Rio de Janeiro	Sailing	Men's 470	17 August 2016
Gold	Sara Kolak	(Brazil) 2016 Rio de Janeiro	Athletics	Women's javelin throw	18 August 2016
Silver	Damir Martin	(Brazil) 2016 Rio de Janeiro	Rowing	Men's single sculls	13 August 2016
Silver	Tonči Stipanović	(Brazil) 2016 Rio de Janeiro	Sailing	Men's laser	16 August 2016
Silver	Men's water polo team: Josip Pavić Damir Burić Antonio Petković Luka Lončar Maro Joković Luka Bukić Xavier García Andro Bušlje Sandro Sukno Ivan Krapić Anđelo Šetka Marko Macan Marko Bijač (Team coached by Ivica Tucak)	(Brazil) 2016 Rio de Janeiro	Water polo	Men's tournament	20 August 2016
Bronze	Filip Hrgović	(Brazil) 2016 Rio de Janeiro	Boxing	Men's super heavyweight	19 August 2016
Bronze	Blanka Vlašić	(Brazil) 2016 Rio de Janeiro	Athletics	Women's high jump	20 August 2016
Gold	Matea Jelić	(Japan) 2020 Tokyo	Taekwondo	Women's 67 kg	26 July 2021
Gold	Martin Sinković; Valent Sinković	(Japan) 2020 Tokyo	Rowing	Men's coxless pair	29 July 2021
Gold	Nikola Mektić; Mate Pavić	(Japan) 2020 Tokyo	Tennis	Men's doubles	30 July 2021
Silver	Marin Čilić; Ivan Dodig	(Japan) 2020 Tokyo	Tennis	Men's doubles	30 July 2021
Silver	Tonči Stipanović	(Japan) 2020 Tokyo	Sailing	Men's laser	1 August 2021
Silver	Tin Srbić	(Japan) 2020 Tokyo	Gymnastics	Men's horizontal bar	3 August 2021
Bronze	Toni Kanaet	(Japan) 2020 Tokyo	Taekwondo	Men's 80 kg	26 July 2021
Bronze	Damir Martin	(Japan) 2020 Tokyo	Rowing	Men's single sculls	30 July 2021
Bronze	Ivan Huklek	(Japan) 2020 Tokyo	Wrestling	Men's –87kg	4 August 2021
Gold	Barbara Matić	(France) 2024 Paris	Judo	Women's 70 kg	31 July 2024
Gold	Martin Sinković; Valent Sinković	(France) 2024 Paris	Rowing	Men's coxless pair	2 August 2024
Silver	Donna Vekić	(France) 2024 Paris	Tennis	Women's singles	3 August 2024
Silver	Men's water polo team: Marko Bijač Rino Burić Loren Fatović Luka Lončar Maro Joković Luka Bukić Ante Vukičević Marko Žuvela Jerko Marinić Kragić Josip Vrlić Matias Biljaka Konstantin Kharkov Toni Popadić (Team coached by Ivica Tucak)	(France) 2024 Paris	Water polo	Men's tournament	11 August 2024
Bronze	Miran Maričić	(France) 2024 Paris	Shooting	Men's 10 metre air rifle	29 July 2024
Bronze	Sandra Perković	(France) 2024 Paris	Athletics	Women's discus throw	5 August 2024
Bronze	Lena Stojković	(France) 2024 Paris	Taekwondo	Women's 49 kg	7 August 2024

=== Winter Olympics ===
Medal	Name	Games	Sport	Event	Date
Gold	Janica Kostelić	(United States) 2002 Salt Lake City	Alpine skiing	Women's combined	14 February 2002
Gold	Janica Kostelić	(United States) 2002 Salt Lake City	Alpine skiing	Women's slalom	20 February 2002
Gold	Janica Kostelić	(United States) 2002 Salt Lake City	Alpine skiing	Women's giant slalom	22 February 2002
Silver	Janica Kostelić	(United States) 2002 Salt Lake City	Alpine skiing	Women's super-G	17 February 2002
Gold	Janica Kostelić	(Italy) 2006 Turin	Alpine skiing	Women's combined	18 February 2006
Silver	Janica Kostelić	(Italy) 2006 Turin	Alpine skiing	Women's super-G	20 February 2006
Silver	Ivica Kostelić	(Italy) 2006 Turin	Alpine skiing	Men's combined	14 February 2006
Silver	Ivica Kostelić	(Canada) 2010 Vancouver	Alpine skiing	Men's combined	21 February 2010
Silver	Ivica Kostelić	(Canada) 2010 Vancouver	Alpine skiing	Men's slalom	27 February 2010
Bronze	Jakov Fak	(Canada) 2010 Vancouver	Biathlon	Men's sprint	14 February 2010
Silver	Ivica Kostelić	(Russia) 2014 Sochi	Alpine skiing	Men's combined	14 February 2014

== Multiple medal winners ==
This following list only contains Olympic medal winners for Croatia as an independent country.

Athlete	Sex	Sport	Years	Games	Gold	Silver	Bronze	Total
Janica Kostelić	F	Alpine skiing	2002–2006	Winter	4	2	0	6
Martin Sinković	M	Rowing	2012–2024	Summer	3	1	0	4
Valent Sinković	M	Rowing	2012–2024	Summer	3	1	0	4
Venio Losert	M	Handball	1996–2012	Summer	2	0	1	3
Sandra Perković	F	Athletics	2012–2024	Summer	2	0	1	3
Slavko Goluža	M	Handball	1996–2004	Summer	2	0	0	2
Valter Matošević	M	Handball	1996–2004	Summer	2	0	0	2
Maro Joković	M	Water polo	2012–2024	Summer	1	2	0	3
Igor Hinić	M	Water polo	1996–2012	Summer	1	1	0	2
Josip Pavić	M	Water polo	2012–2016	Summer	1	1	0	2
Damir Burić	M	Water polo	2012–2016	Summer	1	1	0	2
Andro Bušlje	M	Water polo	2012–2016	Summer	1	1	0	2
Sandro Sukno	M	Water polo	2012–2016	Summer	1	1	0	2
Nikolaj Pešalov	M	Weightlifting	2000–2004	Summer	1	0	1	2
Ivano Balić	M	Handball	2004–2012	Summer	1	0	1	2
Blaženko Lacković	M	Handball	2004–2012	Summer	1	0	1	2
Igor Vori	M	Handball	2004–2012	Summer	1	0	1	2
Drago Vuković	M	Handball	2004–2012	Summer	1	0	1	2
Ivica Kostelić	M	Alpine skiing	2006–2014	Winter	0	4	0	4
Damir Martin	M	Rowing	2012–2020	Summer	0	2	1	3
Marko Bijač	M	Water polo	2016–2024	Summer	0	2	0	2
Luka Bukić	M	Water polo	2016–2024	Summer	0	2	0	2
Luka Lončar	M	Water polo	2016–2024	Summer	0	2	0	2
Tonči Stipanović	M	Sailing	2016–2020	Summer	0	2	0	2
Nikša Skelin	M	Rowing	2000–2004	Summer	0	1	1	2
Siniša Skelin	M	Rowing	2000–2004	Summer	0	1	1	2
Blanka Vlašić	F	Athletics	2008–2016	Summer	0	1	1	2
Goran Ivanišević	M	Tennis	1992	Summer	0	0	2	2

== See also ==
- List of flag bearers for Croatia at the Olympics
- Category:Olympic competitors for Croatia
- Croatia at the Paralympics
- Milan Neralić
- List of Yugoslav Olympic medalists
