= Croatia at the 1994 Winter Olympics =

- IOC code: CRO
- NOC: Croatian Olympic Committee
- Website: www.hoo.hr (in Croatian and English)

in Lillehammer
- Competitors: 3 in 2 sports
- Flag bearer: Vedran Pavlek
- Medals: Gold 0 Silver 0 Bronze 0 Total 0

Winter Olympics appearances (overview)
- 1992; 1994; 1998; 2002; 2006; 2010; 2014; 2018; 2022; 2026

Other related appearances
- Yugoslavia (1924–1988)

Croatia was represented at the 1994 Winter Olympics in Lillehammer, Norway by the Croatian Olympic Committee.

In total, three athletes represented Croatia in two different sports including alpine skiing and cross-country skiing.

== Competitors ==
In total, three athletes represented Croatia at the 1994 Winter Olympics in Lillehammer, Norway across two different sports.

Sport	Men	Women	Total
Alpine skiing	1	0	1
Cross-country skiing	2	0	2
Total	3	0	3

== Alpine skiing ==
One Croatian athlete participated in the alpine skiing events – Vedran Pavlek in the men's super-G, the giant slalom and slalom.

The men's super-G took place on 17 February 1994. Pavlek completed the course in one minute 38.51 seconds to finish 41st overall.

The men's giant slalom took place on 23 February 1994. Pavlek completed his first run in one minute 32.13 seconds and his second run in one minute 26.78 seconds for a combined time of two minutes 58.91 seconds to finish 27th overall.

The men's slalom took place on 27 February 1994. Pavlek did not finish his first run and did not take part in the second runs.

Men

Athlete	Event	Final				
Athlete	Event	Run 1	Run 2	Run 3	Total	Rank
Vedran Pavlek	Super-G				1:38.51	41
Vedran Pavlek	Giant slalom	1:32.13	1:26.78		2:58.91	27
Vedran Pavlek	Slalom	DNF				

== Cross country skiing ==
Two Croatian athletes participated in the cross-country skiing events – Antonio Rački and Siniša Vukonić in the men's 10 km classical, 15 km freestyle pursuit, 30 km freestyle and 50 km classical.

The men's 30 km classical took place on 14 February 1994. Rački completed the course in one hour 25 minutes 42.4 seconds to finish 62nd overall. Vukonić completed the course in one hour 21 minutes 57.2 seconds to finish 44th overall.

The men's 10 km classical took place on 17 February 1994. Rački completed the course in 28 minutes 58.6 seconds to finish 79th overall. Vukonić completed the course in 27 minutes 17.5 seconds to finish 56th overall.

The men's 15 km freestyle pursuit also took place on 17 February 1994. Rački completed the combined courses in 48 minutes 18.8 seconds to finish 71st overall. Vukonić completed the combined courses in 42 minutes 25.3 seconds to finish 44th overall.

The men's 50 km classical took place on 27 February 1994. Rački completed the course in two hours 23 minutes 23.4 seconds to finish 52nd overall. Vukonić completed the course in two hours 24 minutes 12.6 seconds to finish 54th overall.

Men

Athlete	Event	Final					
Athlete	Event	Start	Rank	Time	Rank	Total	Rank
Antonio Rački	10 km classical					28:58.6	79
Antonio Rački	15 km freestyle pursuit	+04:38	79	43:40.8	71	+12:30.0	71
Antonio Rački	30 km freestyle					1:25:42.4	62
Antonio Rački	50 km classical					2:23:23.4	52
Siniša Vukonić	10 km classical					27:17.5	56
Siniša Vukonić	15 km freestyle pursuit	+02:57	56	39:28.3	44	+6:36.5	44
Siniša Vukonić	30 km freestyle					1:21:57.2	44
Siniša Vukonić	50 km classical					2:24:12.6	54

== See also ==
- Official Olympic Reports
