= Croatia at the 2018 Winter Olympics =

- Flag of Croatia
- IOC code: CRO
- NOC: Croatian Olympic Committee
- Website: www.hoo.hr (in Croatian and English)

in Pyeongchang, South Korea 9–25 February 2018
- Competitors: 19 (12 men and 7 women) in 4 sports
- Flag bearers: Natko Zrnčić-Dim (opening); Dražen Silić (closing)
- Medals: Gold 0 Silver 0 Bronze 0 Total 0

Winter Olympics appearances (overview)
- 1992; 1994; 1998; 2002; 2006; 2010; 2014; 2018; 2022; 2026

Other related appearances
- Yugoslavia (1924–1988)

Croatia competed at the 2018 Winter Olympics in Pyeongchang, South Korea, from 9 to 25 February 2018, with 19 competitors in four sports.

== Competitors ==
The following is the list of number of competitors participating in the Croatian delegation per sport.

Sport	Men	Women	Total
Alpine skiing	6	4	10
Bobsleigh	4	0	4
Cross-country skiing	2	2	4
Luge	0	1	1
Total	12	7	19

== Alpine skiing ==
Croatia qualified ten athletes, six male and four female.

Men

Athlete	Event	Run 1		Run 2		Total	
Athlete	Event	Time	Rank	Time	Rank	Time	Rank
Elias Kolega	Slalom	51.18	29	50.94	4	1:42.12	23
Samuel Kolega	Giant slalom	1:14.61	45	1:14.13	36	2:28.74	37
Istok Rodeš	Slalom	49.60	18	51.81	22	1:41.41	21
Matej Vidović	Slalom	DNF					
Natko Zrnčić-Dim	Combined	1:22.07	40	48.48	13	2:10.55	19
Natko Zrnčić-Dim	Downhill	—				DNS	
Natko Zrnčić-Dim	Super-G	—				1:27.05	29
Filip Zubčić	Combined	1:21.54	28	48.06	8	2:09.60	12
Filip Zubčić	Giant slalom	1:10.95	23	1:10.89	19	2:21.84	24
Filip Zubčić	Slalom	DNF					
Filip Zubčić	Super-G	—				DNF	

Women

Athlete	Event	Run 1		Run 2		Total	
Athlete	Event	Time	Rank	Time	Rank	Time	Rank
Andrea Komšić	Giant slalom	1:15.54	31	1:12.96	32	2:28.50	32
Andrea Komšić	Slalom	53.41	36	52.85	32	1:46.26	31
Leona Popović	Combined	DNS					
Leona Popović	Giant slalom	DNF					
Ida Štimac	Giant slalom	1:16.86	40	1:14.32	36	2:31.18	34
Ida Štimac	Slalom	54.14	37	DNF			
Lana Zbašnik	Giant slalom	DNS					

== Bobsleigh ==
Based on their rankings in the 2017–18 Bobsleigh World Cup, Croatia has qualified 2 sleds.

Athlete	Event	Run 1		Run 2		Run 3		Run 4		Total	
Athlete	Event	Time	Rank	Time	Rank	Time	Rank	Time	Rank	Time	Rank
Dražen Silić*; Benedikt Nikpalj	Two-man	50.76	30	50.91	30	50.99	30	Eliminated		2:32.66	30
Dražen Silić*; Mate Mezulić; Benedikt Nikpalj; Antonio Zelić	Four-man	50.18	28	50.64	28	50.63	28	Eliminated		2:31.45	28

* – Denotes the driver of each sled

== Cross-country skiing ==
Croatia qualified two male and two female athletes.

Distance

Athlete	Event	Classical		Freestyle		Final		
Athlete	Event	Time	Rank	Time	Rank	Time	Deficit	Rank
Krešimir Crnković	Men's 15 km freestyle	—				36:44.7	+3:00.8	47
Krešimir Crnković	Men's 30 km skiathlon	44:31.3	58	38:25.1	44	1:23:26.9	+7:06.9	53
Edi Dadić	Men's 15 km freestyle	—				36:57.2	+3:13.3	53
Edi Dadić	Men's 30 km skiathlon	44:45.2	60	DNF				
Vedrana Malec	Women's 10 km freestyle	—				30:20.3	+5:19.8	71

Sprint

Athlete	Event	Qualification		Quarterfinal		Semifinal		Final	
Athlete	Event	Time	Rank	Time	Rank	Time	Rank	Time	Rank
Edi Dadić	Men's sprint	3:33.17	69	Did not advance					
Vedrana Malec	Women's sprint	3:54.76	64	Did not advance					
Gabrijela Skender	Women's sprint	3:56.23	65	Did not advance					

== Luge ==
Croatia has qualified one athlete, signifying the nation's Olympic debut in the sport.

Athlete	Event	Run 1		Run 2		Run 3		Run 4		Total	
Athlete	Event	Time	Rank	Time	Rank	Time	Rank	Time	Rank	Time	Rank
Daria Obratov	Women's singles	48.615	28	48.252	28	48.686	29	Eliminated		2:25.553	27

== See also ==
- Croatia at the 2018 Summer Youth Olympics
