= Croatia at the 2010 Winter Olympics =

- IOC code: CRO
- NOC: Croatian Olympic Committee
- Website: www.hoo.hr (in Croatian and English)

in Vancouver
- Competitors: 19 in 4 sports
- Flag bearer: Jakov Fak
- Medals Ranked 21st: Gold 0 Silver 2 Bronze 1 Total 3

Winter Olympics appearances (overview)
- 1992; 1994; 1998; 2002; 2006; 2010; 2014; 2018; 2022; 2026; 2030

Other related appearances
- Yugoslavia (1924–1988)

Croatia participated at the 2010 Winter Olympics in Vancouver, British Columbia, Canada. The Croatian delegation consisted of nineteen athletes in four sports.

== Medalists ==
Medal	Name	Sport	Event	Date
Silver	Ivica Kostelić	Alpine skiing	Men's combined	21 February
Silver	Ivica Kostelić	Alpine skiing	Men's slalom	27 February
Bronze	Jakov Fak	Biathlon	Men's sprint	14 February

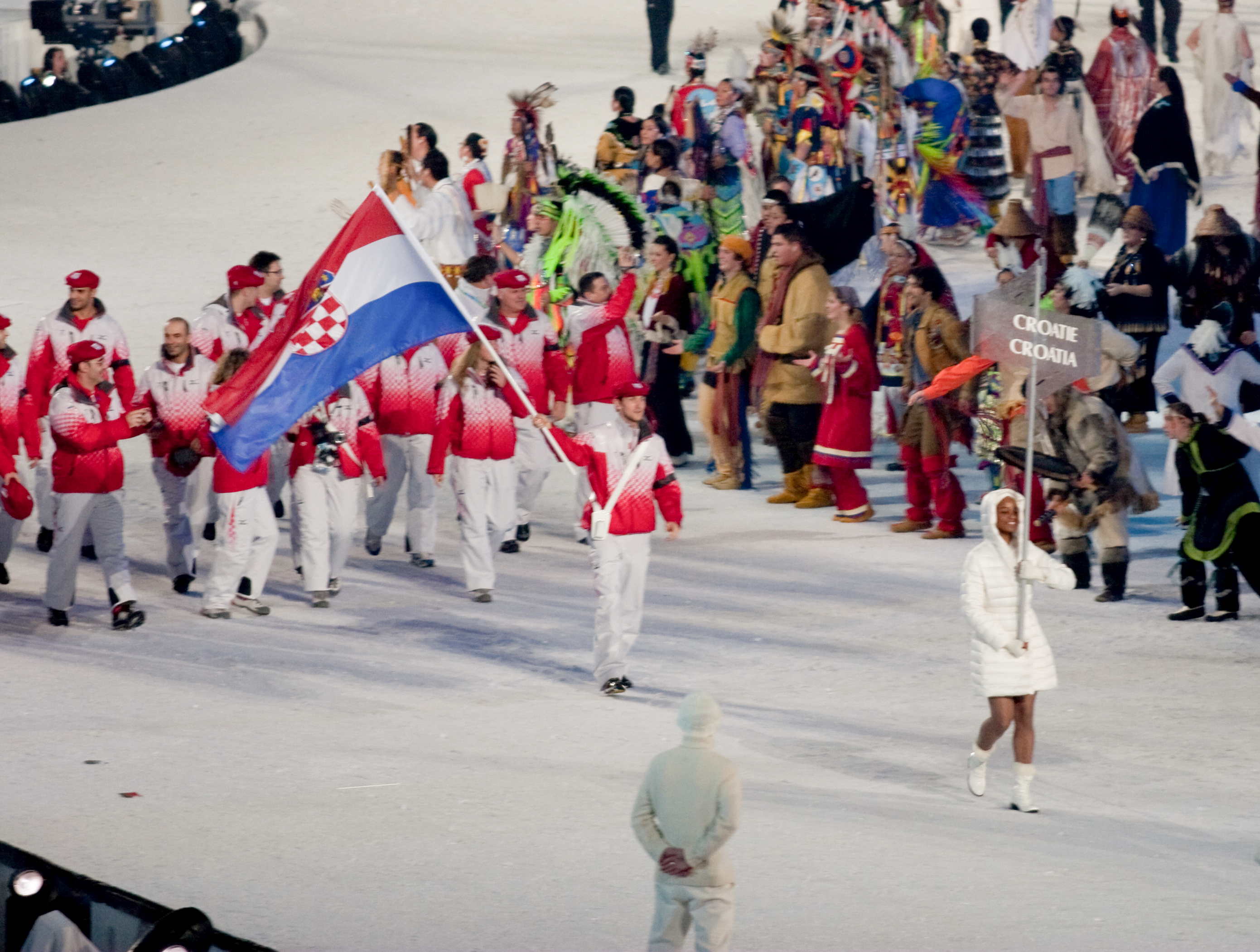
The athletes entering the stadium during the opening ceremonies.

== Alpine skiing ==
Croatia qualified ten alpine skiers. Ivica Kostelić was the only athlete able to medal, winning two silver medals.

Men

Athlete	Event	Run 1	Run 2	Total	Rank
Ivica Kostelić	Men's combined	1:54.20	51.05	2:45.25	2nd place, silver medalist(s)
Ivica Kostelić	Men's downhill			1:55.49	18
Ivica Kostelić	Men's giant slalom	1:18.05	1:20.83	2:38.88	7
Ivica Kostelić	Men's slalom	48.37	51.11	1:39.48	2nd place, silver medalist(s)
Ivica Kostelić	Men's super-G			1:31.47	16
Danko Marinelli	Men's giant slalom	DSQ			
Danko Marinelli	Men's slalom	52.28	55.05	1:47.33	32
Ivan Ratkić	Men's combined	DNF			
Ivan Ratkić	Men's downhill			1:58.58	41
Ivan Ratkić	Men's super-G			1:32.67	26
Dalibor Šamšal	Men's giant slalom	DNF			
Dalibor Šamšal	Men's slalom	DNF			
Natko Zrnčić-Dim	Men's combined	1:54.87	53.99	2:48.86	20
Natko Zrnčić-Dim	Men's downhill			1:57.02	33
Natko Zrnčić-Dim	Men's giant slalom	1:21.84	1:24.17	2:46.01	41
Natko Zrnčić-Dim	Men's slalom	50.01	51.98	1:41.99	19
Natko Zrnčić-Dim	Men's super-G			DNF	

Women

Athlete	Event	Run 1	Run 2	Total	Rank
Matea Ferk	Women's giant slalom	DNF			
Matea Ferk	Women's slalom	54.95	55.98	1:50.93	34
Nika Fleiss	Women's giant slalom	1:19.75	DNS		
Nika Fleiss	Women's slalom	54.95	55.98	1:50.93	34
Ana Jelušić	Women's giant slalom	1:20.62	DNS		
Ana Jelušić	Women's slalom	52.37	53.06	1:45.43	12
Tea Palić	Women's giant slalom	1:19.95	1:16.17	2:36.12	36
Sofija Novoselić	Women's slalom	58.17	56.74	1:54.91	39

== Biathlon ==
Croatia qualified two biathletes, one man and one woman. Jakov Fak became the first Croatian to win a medal outside of alpine skiing, and also became the first Croatian Winter Olympic medalist who was not from the Kostelić family.

Men

Athlete	Event	Final		
Athlete	Event	Time	Misses	Rank
Jakov Fak	Men's individual	53:56.0	1+1+0+2	51
Jakov Fak	Men's sprint	24:21.8	0+0	3rd place, bronze medalist(s)
Jakov Fak	Men's pursuit	35:45.6	2+1+0+1	25
Jakov Fak	Men's mass start	36:10.5	1+1+0+1	9

Women

Athlete	Event	Final		
Athlete	Event	Time	Misses	Rank
Andrijana Stipaničić-Mrvelj	Women's individual	53:06.1	1+3+0+1	83
Andrijana Stipaničić-Mrvelj	Women's sprint	DNS		

== Bobsleigh ==
Athlete	Event	Run 1		Run 2		Run 3		Run 4		Total	
Athlete	Event	Time	Rank	Time	Rank	Time	Rank	Time	Rank	Time	Rank
Ivan Šola; Slaven Krajačić; Mate Mezulić*; Igor Marić; Andras Haklits*	Four-man	52.58	24	52.69	20	53.15	21	53.11	19	3:31.53	20

* Mezulić competed in runs 1 and 2, while Haklits competed in runs 3 and 4.

== Cross-country skiing ==
Men

Athlete	Event	Final	
Athlete	Event	Time	Rank
Andrej Burić	15 km freestyle	38:51.0	75

Women

Athlete	Event	Qualification		Quarterfinals		Semifinals		Final	
Athlete	Event	Time	Rank	Time	Rank	Time	Rank	Time	Rank
Nina Broznić	Sprint	4:15.31	52	Did not advance					52

== See also ==
- Croatia at the Olympics
- Croatia at the 2010 Winter Paralympics
