= Croatia at the 2014 Winter Olympics =

- IOC code: CRO
- NOC: Croatian Olympic Committee
- Website: www.hoo.hr (in Croatian and English)

in Sochi
- Competitors: 11 in 3 sports
- Flag bearers: Ivica Kostelić (opening); Vedrana Malec (closing)
- Medals Ranked 25th: Gold 0 Silver 1 Bronze 0 Total 1

Winter Olympics appearances (overview)
- 1992; 1994; 1998; 2002; 2006; 2010; 2014; 2018; 2022; 2026

Other related appearances
- Yugoslavia (1924–1988)

Croatia competed at the 2014 Winter Olympics in Sochi, Russia, from 7 to 23 February 2014. Croatia qualified 11 athletes, the fewest athletes in the fewest sports since the 1998 Winter Olympics.

== Competitors ==
Sport	Men	Women	Total
Alpine skiing	6	2	8
Cross-country skiing	1	1	2
Snowboarding	0	1	1
Total	7	4	11

== Medalists ==
Medal	Name	Sport	Event
Silver	Ivica Kostelić	Alpine skiing	Men's combined

== Alpine skiing ==
According to the quota allocation released on 20 January 2014, Croatia had eight athletes in qualification position. One of the women's quotas was exchanged for the sixth quota in men's alpine skiing. The team was announced on 27 January.

Men

Athlete	Event	Run 1		Run 2		Total	
Athlete	Event	Time	Rank	Time	Rank	Time	Rank
Sebastian Brigović	Giant slalom	1:25.82	38	1:26.43	35	2:52.25	34
Ivica Kostelić	Combined	1:54.17	7	51.37	3	2:45.54	2nd place, silver medalist(s)
Ivica Kostelić	Giant slalom	1:23.87	30	1:25.81	27	2:49.68	27
Ivica Kostelić	Slalom	48.75	21	55.36	8	1:44.11	9
Ivica Kostelić	Super-G	—				1:20.19	24
Dalibor Šamšal	Slalom	50.71	36	58.28	18	1:48.99	18
Matej Vidović	Slalom	51.74	42	1:06.07	33	1:57.81	28
Natko Zrnčić-Dim	Combined	1:55.26	19	51.80	6	2:47.06	10
Natko Zrnčić-Dim	Downhill	—				2:09.80	29
Natko Zrnčić-Dim	Slalom	50.64	35	DNF			
Natko Zrnčić-Dim	Super-G	—				1:19.75	19
Filip Zubčić	Giant slalom	DNF					

Women

Athlete	Event	Run 1		Run 2		Total	
Athlete	Event	Time	Rank	Time	Rank	Time	Rank
Andrea Komšić	Giant slalom	1:24.24	38	1:22.37	35	2:46.61	35
Andrea Komšić	Slalom	1:00.82	39	57.78	32	1:58.60	33
Sofija Novoselić	Giant slalom	1:24.25	39	DNF			
Sofija Novoselić	Slalom	DNF					

== Cross-country skiing ==
According to the quota allocation released on 20 January 2014, Croatia had two athletes in qualification position. For the first time since 2006 Croatia qualified athletes with A standards, meaning that they will be able to compete in more than one event. Vedrana Malec was the only female Croatian skier that reached A standard while the men's quota was decided between Edi Dadić and Andrej Burić. The team was announced on 24 January.

Distance

Athlete	Event	Classical		Freestyle		Final		
Athlete	Event	Time	Rank	Time	Rank	Time	Deficit	Rank
Edi Dadić	Men's 15 km classical	—				43:38.8	+5:09.1	60
Edi Dadić	Men's 30 km skiathlon	41:08.0	66	37:48.5	65	1:19:31.5	+11:16.1	65
Edi Dadić	Men's 50 km freestyle	—				2:02:35.5	+15:40.3	58
Vedrana Malec	Women's 10 km classical	—				33:42.3	+5:24.5	56
Vedrana Malec	Women's 15 km skiathlon	22:23.2	58	22:50.1	59	45:52.1	+7:18.5	59
Vedrana Malec	Women's 30 km freestyle	—				1:24:13.4	+13:08.2	53

Sprint

Athlete	Event	Qualification		Quarterfinal		Semifinal		Final	
Athlete	Event	Time	Rank	Time	Rank	Time	Rank	Time	Rank
Edi Dadić	Men's sprint	3:52.89	69	Did not advance					
Vedrana Malec	Women's sprint	2:54.60	61	Did not advance					

== Snowboarding ==
Croatia received a reallocation quota spot in women's halfpipe. This was the first time that Croatia will be represented in a snowboarding event at the Olympics. The sole representative was announced on 24 January.

Halfpipe

Athlete	Event	Qualification				Semifinal				Final			
Athlete	Event	Run 1	Run 2	Best	Rank	Run 1	Run 2	Best	Rank	Run 1	Run 2	Best	Rank
Morena Makar	Women's halfpipe	44.75	22.75	44.75	13	Did not advance							

== Sports without participation by Croatia ==
=== Biathlon ===
Despite winning a bronze medal in biathlon at the 2010 Winter Olympics, Croatia was the eight reserve in men's biathlon. For the first time since the 1998 Winter Olympics, Croatia did not compete in biathlon. Jakov Fak, the 2010 bronze medalist, competed for Slovenia this year instead of Croatia.

=== Bobsleigh ===
Croatia was the third reserve in four-man bobsleigh event. This was the first time since the 1998 Winter Olympics that Croatia did not qualify for the Olympics in a bobsleigh event.

=== Figure skating ===
Josip Gluhak competed at the 2013 Nebelhorn Trophy, but failed to qualify for the Olympics. Croatia has not competed in a figure skating event since 2006.

=== Luge ===
Croatia's Daria Obratov was the first reserve in women's luge. Croatia has never competed in an Olympic luge event.
