= Kvatch =

Kvatch may be:

- an alternative spelling of kvetch
- the name of a fictional location in the 2006 video game The Elder Scrolls IV: Oblivion

== See also ==
- Dmitry Kvach
- Kavach (disambiguation)
