= Jin-hee =

- Hangul: 진희
- RR: Jinhui
- MR: Chinhŭi

Jin-hee is a Korean given name.

People with this name include:

- Jeon Jin-hui, stage name Kang Hyo-shil (1932–1996), South Korean actress
- Han Jin-hee (born 1949), South Korean actor
- Kim Jin-hi (born 1957), South Korean female traditional musician
- Ji Jin-hee (born 1971), South Korean actor
- Park Jin-hee (born 1978), South Korean actress
- Kim Jin-hee (footballer) (born 1981), South Korean female footballer
- Kim Jin-hee (tennis) (born 1981), South Korean female tennis player
- Lee Jin-hee (bobsledder) (born 1984), South Korean female bobsledder
- Yoon Jin-hee (born 1986), South Korean female weightlifter
- Baek Jin-hee (born 1990), South Korean actress

== See also ==
- List of Korean given names
