= Yurkov =

Yurkov (Russian, Ukrainian: Юрко́в) is a Russian and Ukrainian surname that may refer to:

- Andrey Yurkov (born 1983), Russian bobsledder
- Oleksandr Yurkov (born 1975), Ukrainian decathlete
