= Lee Jin-hee =

Lee Jin-hee may refer to:

- Lee Jin-hee (field hockey)
- Lee Jin-hee (bobsledder)
- Lee Jin-hee (actress)
