= Dejan Vojnović =

Croatian sprinter and bobsledder

Personal information
- Born: 23 March 1975 (age 51) Split, Yugoslavia

Sport
- Sport: Track and field
Medal record
Representing Croatia
Summer Universiade
Bronze medal – third place	2003 Daegu	100m

Dejan Vojnović (born 23 March 1975) is a retired Croatian sportsperson. He started his career as a sprinter specializing in the 100 metres run, and competed at the 2000 Summer Olympics. Some years later he took up bobsleigh, participating in the 2006 Winter Olympics. He was working as a fitness coach for former WTA No. 1 player Dinara Safina (2008–2010). From 2010 to 2012 he was a fitness coach of Slovak WTA player Dominika Cibulková. After that, in 2010. he had a short cooperation with another WTA player from Serbia, Jelena Janković. He has worked as a fitness coach for WTA player Laura Robson from United Kingdom, and as of 2023 is working with Jack Draper.

== Athletics career ==
He was born in Split, and belonged to the sports club Atletski Sportski Klub based in Split. He was the Croatian 100 metres champion in 1999, 2001, 2003 and 2004. He also became the long jump champion in 1999, and 60 metres indoor champion in 2002 and 2004.

His first major international event was the 2000 Olympic Games. He competed in the 100 metres event, but without progressing from the first round. He also competed with the Croatian team in the 4 × 100 metre relay, but was knocked out in the heats here as well. He later managed to reach the quarter-final at the 2002 European Championships, and the semi-final at the 2002 European Indoor Championships, the 2003 World Indoor Championships and the 2004 World Indoor Championships. He won the bronze medal at the 2003 Summer Universiade.

His personal best time was 10.25 seconds, achieved at the 2001 Mediterranean Games in Radès, Tunisia. He also has 6.63 seconds in the 60 metres, achieved in March 2003 in Linz; and 7.87 metres (25.8 ft) in the long jump, achieved in July 1999 in Split. He came close to his personal best time on several occasions, running seasons bests of 10.32 seconds in 2002, 10.34 seconds in 2003 and 10.36 seconds in 2004. However, he retired from international athletics after the 2004 season.

== Bobsleigh career ==
After his retirement from athletics, Vojnović took up bobsleigh, participating in the 2006 Winter Olympics in Turin, as a part of the national four-man bobsleigh team.

The team also consisted of then 44-year-old Ivan Šola, as well as two athletes, Jurica Grabušić and Slaven Krajačić. Krajačić had been a team member of Vojnović in the 2000 Olympic relay race. The bobsleigh team finished in 23rd place overall.

Vojnović stands 1.82 m (5 ft 11 1/2 in) tall, and during his active career he weighed 82–83 kilograms (181–183 lb).
