= Ferk =

Ferk may refer to:

== People ==
- Janko Ferk (born 1958), Austrian judge, scientist and author
- Maruša Ferk (born 1988), Slovenian alpine skier
- Matea Ferk (born 1987), Croatian alpine skier
