= Croatia at the 2022 Winter Olympics =

- Flag of Croatia
- IOC code: CRO
- NOC: Croatian Olympic Committee
- Website: www.hoo.hr (in Croatian and English)

in Beijing, China 4–20 February 2022
- Competitors: 11 (4 men and 7 women) in 4 sports
- Flag bearers (opening): Zrinka Ljutić; Marko Skender
- Flag bearer (closing): Tena Hadžic
- Medals: Gold 0 Silver 0 Bronze 0 Total 0

Winter Olympics appearances (overview)
- 1992; 1994; 1998; 2002; 2006; 2010; 2014; 2018; 2022; 2026; 2030

Other related appearances
- Yugoslavia (1924–1988)

Croatia competed at the 2022 Winter Olympics in Beijing, China, from 4 to 20 February 2022.

The Croatian team consisted of 11 athletes (four men and seven women).

Zrinka Ljutić and Marko Skender were the country's flagbearer during the opening ceremony. Meanwhile, cross-country skier Tena Hadžic was the flagbearer during the closing ceremony.

== Competitors ==
The following is the list of number of competitors participating at the Games per sport/discipline.

Sport	Men	Women	Total
Alpine skiing	3	3	6
Cross-country skiing	1	2	3
Short track speed skating	0	1	1
Snowboarding	0	1	1
Total	4	7	11

== Alpine skiing ==
Croatia qualified three male and two female alpine skiers, then added one more female quota through reallocation. They also qualified for the team event but declined to participate.

Athlete	Event	Run 1		Run 2		Total	
Athlete	Event	Time	Rank	Time	Rank	Time	Rank
Samuel Kolega	Men's giant slalom	1:06.53	24	1:10.75	23	2:17.28	21
Filip Zubčić	Men's giant slalom	1:04.69	15	1:07.40	9	2:12.09	10
Samuel Kolega	Men's slalom	55.54	18	50.42	6	1:45.96	15
Matej Vidović	Men's slalom	56.57	26	50.79	14	1:47.36	20
Filip Zubčić	Men's slalom	55.79	21	50.89	17	1:46.68	18
Andrea Komšić	Women's giant slalom	DNS		Did not advance			
Zrinka Ljutić	Women's giant slalom	1:02.50	35	1:01.27	27	2:03.77	28
Andrea Komšić	Women's slalom	DNF		Did not advance			
Zrinka Ljutić	Women's slalom	55.03	26	53.88	23	1:48.91	25
Leona Popović	Women's slalom	55.31	30	53.11	12	1:48.42	23

== Cross-country skiing ==
By meeting the basic qualification standards Croatia has qualified one male and one female cross-country skier. An additional female skier is added by virtue of a top 33 placing in the Nations ranking as of December 11, 2021.

Distance

Athlete	Event	Final		
Athlete	Event	Time	Deficit	Rank
Marko Skender	Men's 15 km classical	48:30.8	+10:36.0	85
Marko Skender	Men's 50 km freestyle	1:30:34.5	+19:01.8	57
Tena Hadžić	Women's 10 km classical	36:27.5	+8:21.2	83
Vedrana Malec	Women's 10 km classical	34:31.6	+6:25.3	73
Vedrana Malec	Women's 30 km freestyle	1:41:18.6	+16:24.6	52

Sprint

Athlete	Event	Qualification		Quarterfinal		Semifinal		Final	
Athlete	Event	Time	Rank	Time	Rank	Time	Rank	Time	Rank
Marko Skender	Men's sprint	3:06.86	69	Did not advance					
Tena Hadžić	Women's sprint	3:45.60	71	Did not advance					
Vedrana Malec	Women's sprint	3:33.12	53	Did not advance					
Tena Hadžić; Vedrana Malec	Women's team sprint	—				26:29.23	10	Did not advance	20

== Short track speed skating ==
Croatia has qualified one female short track speed skater. This will mark the country's sport debut at the Winter Olympics.

Valentina Aščić was named to the team on January 18, whilst an additional starting place for the 1500 m event was received through the reallocation process.

Athlete	Event	Heat		Quarterfinal		Semifinal		Final	
Athlete	Event	Time	Rank	Time	Rank	Time	Rank	Time	Rank
Valentina Aščić	Women's 500 m	44.681	3	Did not advance					23
Valentina Aščić	Women's 1500 m	—		2:21.456	5	Did not advance			26

== Snowboarding ==
Croatia qualified one athlete for the women's big air and slopestyle competitions, signifying the nation's return to the sport for the first time since Sochi 2014.

Freestyle

Athlete	Event	Qualification					Final				
Athlete	Event	Run 1	Run 2	Run 3	Best	Rank	Run 1	Run 2	Run 3	Best	Rank
Lea Jugovac	Women's big air	9.25	15.00	~~10.00~~	24.25	28	Did not advance				
Lea Jugovac	Women's slopestyle	DNS					Did not advance				
