= Croatia at the 2002 Winter Olympics =

- IOC code: CRO
- NOC: Croatian Olympic Committee
- Website: www.hoo.hr (in Croatian and English)

in Salt Lake City
- Competitors: 14 in 5 sports
- Flag bearer: Janica Kostelić
- Medals Ranked 12th: Gold 3 Silver 1 Bronze 0 Total 4

Winter Olympics appearances (overview)
- 1992; 1994; 1998; 2002; 2006; 2010; 2014; 2018; 2022; 2026; 2030

Other related appearances
- Yugoslavia (1924–1988)

Croatia competed at the 2002 Winter Olympics in Salt Lake City, United States. Janica Kostelić won four medals (three gold), a record for the most medals ever won by a woman skier at a single Olympics. Croatia had never won any Winter Olympic medals previously.

== Medalists ==
Medal	Name	Sport	Event
Gold	Janica Kostelić	Alpine skiing	Women's combined
Gold	Janica Kostelić	Alpine skiing	Women's slalom
Gold	Janica Kostelić	Alpine skiing	Women's giant slalom
Silver	Janica Kostelić	Alpine skiing	Women's Super-G

== Alpine Skiing ==
Men

Athlete	Event	Run 1	Run 2	Run 3	Total	Rank
Ivica Kostelić	Men's giant slalom	1:13.05	1:11.87		2:24.92	9
Ivica Kostelić	Men's slalom	49.60	DNF			

Women

Athlete	Event	Run 1	Run 2	Run 3	Total	Rank
Nika Fleiss	Women's giant slalom	1:20.94	1:19.23		2:40.17	36
Nika Fleiss	Women's slalom	55.39	55.88		1:51.27	12
Ana Jelušić	Women's giant slalom	1:21.73	1:18.82		2:40.55	37
Ana Jelušić	Women's slalom	57.42	57.59		1:55.01	23
Janica Kostelić	Women's combined	44.60	42.68	1:16.00	2:43.28	1st place, gold medalist(s)
Janica Kostelić	Women's giant slalom	1:16.00	1:14.01		2:30.01	1st place, gold medalist(s)
Janica Kostelić	Women's slalom	52.14	53.96		1:46.10	1st place, gold medalist(s)
Janica Kostelić	Women's super-G				1:13.64	2nd place, silver medalist(s)

== Biathlon ==
Men

Athlete	Event	Final		
Athlete	Event	Time	Misses	Rank
Žarko Galjanić	Men's individual	1:04:54.4	0+2+1+3	83
Žarko Galjanić	Men's sprint	30:33.0	1+2	84

== Bobsleigh ==
Athlete	Event	Run 1		Run 2		Run 3		Run 4		Total	
Athlete	Event	Time	Rank	Time	Rank	Time	Rank	Time	Rank	Time	Rank
Ivan Šola; Boris Lovrić; Đulijano Kolundra; Niki Drpić; Igor Boraska*	Four-man	48.84	29	48.45	28	49.17	26	49.68	18	3:16.14	26

== Cross-country skiing ==
- Maja Kezele
  - women's 15 km freestyle: 55th place
  - women's 10 km classical: 57th place
  - women's 10 km (5 km + 5 km) pursuit: 66th place
- Damir Jurčević
  - men's 30 km freestyle: 63rd place
  - men's 15 km classical: 61st place
  - men's 20 km (10 km + 10 km) pursuit: 72nd place
  - sprint 1,5 km freestyle: 48th place
  - men's 50 km classical: 53rd place
- Denis Klobučar
  - men's 30 km freestyle: 66th place
  - men's 15 km classical: 58th place
  - men's 20 km (10 km + 10 km) pursuit: 67th place
  - men's 50 km classical: 54th place

== Figure skating ==
- Idora Hegel women's individual
  - 19th place

== See also ==
- Petar Turković, HOO delegation member
