= Dalibor Šamšal =

Croatian-Hungarian alpine skier (born 1985)

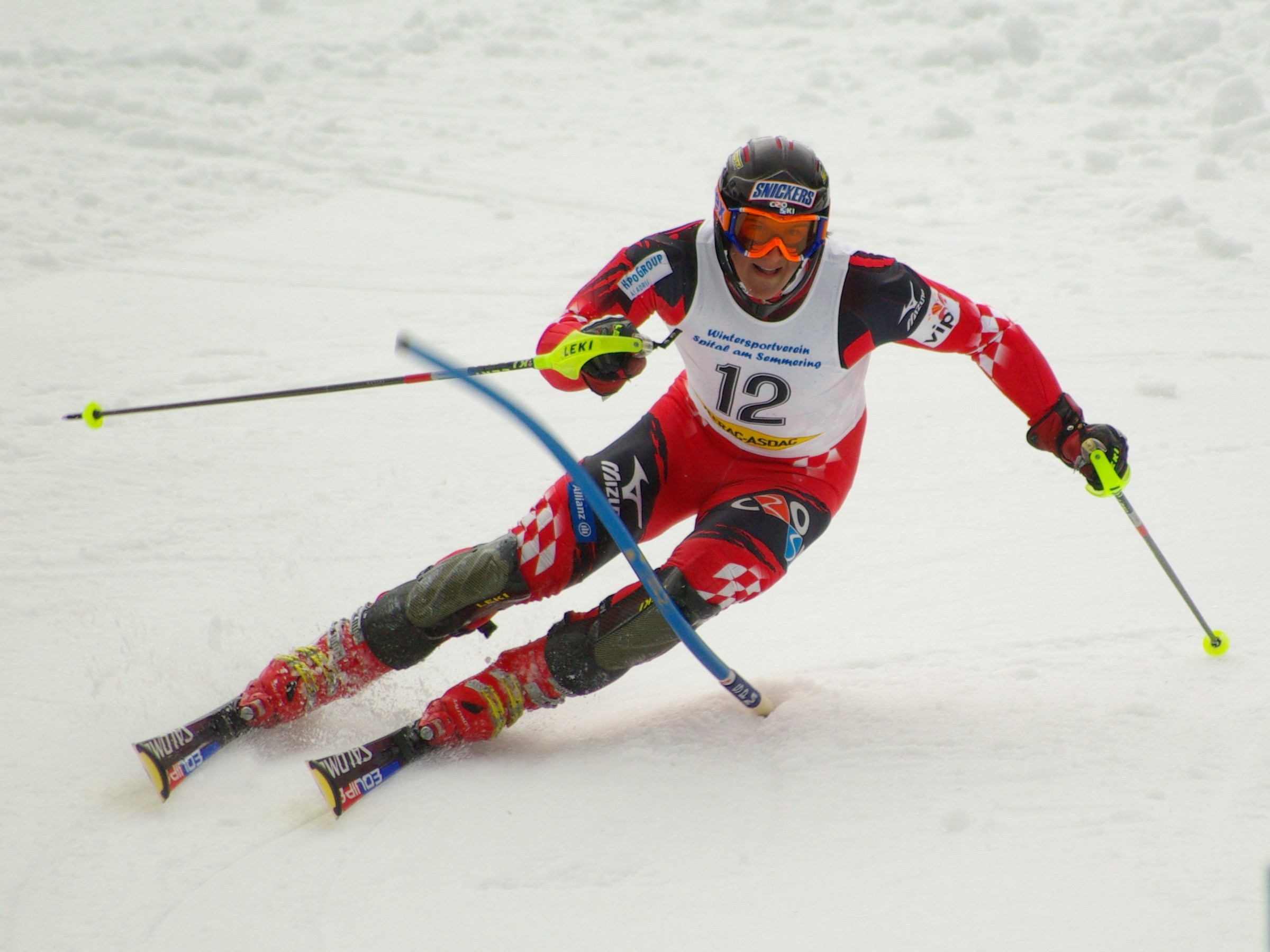
- Dalibor Šamšal in Spital am Semmering 2008.

Personal information
- Born: 25 December 1985 (age 40) Rijeka, SR Croatia, Yugoslavia

Skiing career
- Sport: Alpine skiing
- Disciplines: Slalom
- World Cup debut: 22 December 2004 (age 18)

Olympics
- Teams: 4 – (2006, 2010, 2014, 2018)

World Championships
- Teams: 7 – (2005–17)

World Cup
- Seasons: 13 – (2006–18)

Dalibor Šamšal (born 25 December 1985) is a Croatian-Hungarian alpine skier. He has represented Croatia at the 2006 Winter Olympics, 2010 Winter Olympics and the 2014 Winter Olympics and Hungary at the 2018 Winter Olympics.

== World Cup results ==
=== Season standings ===
Season
Season	Age	Overall	Slalom	Giant; Slalom	Super G	Downhill	Combined
Representing Croatia
2009	23	134	58	—	—	—	—
2011	25	155	—	—	—	—	47
2012	26	145	—	—	—	—	43
Representing Hungary
2016	30	139	50	—	—	—	—

=== Results per discipline ===
Discipline	WC starts	WC Top 30	WC Top 15	WC Top 5	WC Podium	Best result		
Discipline	WC starts	WC Top 30	WC Top 15	WC Top 5	WC Podium	Date	Location	Place
Slalom	82	2	0	0	0	6 January 2009; 17 January 2016	Zagreb, Croatia; Wengen, Switzerland	22nd
Giant slalom	17	0	0	0	0	18 February 2012	Bansko, Bulgaria	44th
Super-G	0	0	0	0	0			
Downhill	1	0	0	0	0	3 February 2012	Chamonix, France	65th
Combined	5	2	0	0	0	30 January 2011	Chamonix, France	24th
Total	105	4	0	0	0			

- standings through 20 Jan 2019

== World Championship results ==
Year
Year	Age	Slalom	Giant; Slalom	Super G	Downhill	Combined	Team Event
Representing Croatia
2005	19	DNF1	DNF1	—	—	—	—
2007	21	DNF1	DNF1	—	—	—	—
2009	23	DNF1	40	—	—	—	—
2011	25	—	—	DNF	—	DNF1	—
2013	27	27	—	—	—	—	—
Representing Hungary
2015	29	DNF2	—	—	—	—	—
2017	31	DNF1	—	—	—	—	—

== Olympic results ==
Year
Year	Age	Slalom	Giant; Slalom	Super G	Downhill	Combined	Team event
Representing Croatia
2006	20	DNF1	—	—	—	—	—N/a
2010	24	DNF1	DNF1	—	—	—	—N/a
2014	28	18	—	—	—	—	—N/a
Representing Hungary
2018	32	DNF1	44	—	—	32	9
