= Croatia at the 2026 Winter Olympics =

- Flag of Croatia
- IOC code: CRO
- NOC: Croatian Olympic Committee
- Website: www.hoo.hr (in Croatian and English)

in Milan and Cortina d'Ampezzo, Italy 6 February 2026 – 22 February 2026
- Competitors: 14 (6 men and 8 women) in 4 sports
- Flag bearers (opening): Matija Legović & Valentina Aščić
- Flag bearers (closing): Marko Skender & Tena Hadžić
- Medals: Gold 0 Silver 0 Bronze 0 Total 0

Winter Olympics appearances (overview)
- 1992; 1994; 1998; 2002; 2006; 2010; 2014; 2018; 2022; 2026

Other related appearances
- Yugoslavia (1924–1988)

Croatia competed at the 2026 Winter Olympics in Milan and Cortina d'Ampezzo, Italy, from 6 to 22 February 2026, with 14 competitors in 4 sports.

Biathlete Matija Legović and short track speed skater Valentina Aščić were the country's flagbearer during the opening ceremony. Meanwhile, cross-country skiers Marko Skender and Tena Hadžić were the country's flagbearer during the closing ceremony.

== Competitors ==
The following is the list of number of competitors participating at the Games per sport/discipline.

Sport	Men	Women	Total
Alpine skiing	3	3	6
Biathlon	2	1	3
Cross-country skiing	1	2	3
Short-track speed skating	0	2	2
Total	6	8	14

== Alpine skiing ==
Croatia qualified one female and one male alpine skier through the basic quota. Two female and two male alpine skiers have qualified by virtue of them being in the top 30 in World Cup standings.

Athlete	Event	Run 1		Run 2		Total	
Athlete	Event	Time	Rank	Time	Rank	Time	Rank
Filip Zubčić	Men's giant slalom	1:16.59	16	1:10.91	10	2:27.50	14
Samuel Kolega	Men's slalom	DNF					
Istok Rodeš	Men's slalom	DNF					
Filip Zubčić	Men's slalom	58.93	15	57.43	11	1:56.36	13
Zrinka Ljutić	Women's giant slalom	1:05.34	24	1:09.67	3	2:15.01	17
Pia Vučinić	Women's giant slalom	DNF					
Zrinka Ljutić	Women's slalom	49.30	16	54.69	30	1:43.99	26
Leona Popović	Women's slalom	49.55	21	DSQ		DNF	
Pia Vučinić	Women's slalom	DNF					

== Biathlon ==
Based on the IBU Qualifying Points list, Croatia qualified one female and two male athletes.

Athlete	Event	Time	Misses	Rank
Krešimir Crnković	Men's individual	1:01:32.3	4 (0+1+1+2)	76
Matija Legović	Men's individual	1:01:11.4	6 (1+1+1+3)	72
Krešimir Crnković	Men's sprint	28:04.5	5 (3+2)	89
Matija Legović	Men's pursuit	LAP		
Matija Legović	Men's sprint	25:58.6	2 (1+1)	59
Anika Kožica	Women's individual	47:11.3	2 (0+0+0+2)	60
Anika Kožica	Women's sprint	23:50.6	0 (0+0)	68

== Cross-country skiing ==
Croatia qualified one female and one male cross-country skier through the basic quota. Following the completion of the 2024–25 FIS Cross-Country World Cup, Croatia qualified further a one female athlete.

Distance

Athlete	Event	Final		
Athlete	Event	Time	Deficit	Rank
Marko Skender	Men's 10 kilometre freestyle	26:40.7	+6:04.5	95
Marko Skender	Men's 50 kilometre classical	LAP		55
Tena Hadžić	Women's 10 km freestyle	30:39.9	+7:50.7	97
Ema Sobol	Women's 10 km freestyle	29:04.6	+6:15.4	88

Sprint

Athlete	Event	Qualification		Quarterfinal		Semifinal		Final	
Athlete	Event	Time	Rank	Time	Rank	Time	Rank	Time	Rank
Marko Skender	Men's sprint	3:31.91	61	Did not advance					
Tena Hadžić	Women's sprint	4:12.88	66	Did not advance					
Ema Sobol	Women's sprint	4:22.67	75	Did not advance					
Tena Hadžić; Ema Sobol	Women's team sprint	7:25.15	19	—N/a				Did not advance	

== Short-track speed skating ==
Croatia qualified two female short-track speed skaters after the conclusion of the 2025–26 ISU Short Track World Tour.

Athlete	Event	Heat		Quarterfinal		Semifinal		Final	
Athlete	Event	Time	Rank	Time	Rank	Time	Rank	Time	Rank
Valentina Aščić	Women's 500 m	44.802	3	Did not advance					23
Valentina Aščić	Women's 1000 m	1:27.863	4	Did not advance					25
Valentina Aščić	Women's 1500 m	—N/a		2:58.133	5	Did not advance			28
Katarina Burić	Women's 1500 m	—N/a		2:31.874	5	Did not advance			26

== See also ==
- Croatia at the 2026 Winter Paralympics
