= Jurica Grabušić =

Croatian hurdler (born 1983)

Medal record

Men's athletics

Representing Croatia

Mediterranean Games
Bronze medal – third place	Almeria 2005	110 m hurdles
Bronze medal – third place	Pescara 2009	110 m hurdles

Jurica Grabušić (born 28 March 1983) is a Croatian athlete who specializes in the 110 metre hurdles. A double Olympic competitor (2004, 2008) in his event, he also participated in bobsleigh at the 2006 Olympic Games.

== Early career ==
He was born in Zagreb, and joined the sports club Hrvatski Akademski Atletski Klub Mladost, the athletics section of Mladost. He took his first of several national titles in 2001, both outdoors and indoors.

As a junior athlete he made his international debut at the 2000 World Junior Championships, where he failed to progress from the first round of the hurdles competition. At the 2002 World Junior Championships he placed sixth in the hurdles final, and also competed in the 100 metres event. He also competed at the 2002 European Indoor Championships and the 2002 European Championships without progressing from the first round. His personal best time by 2002 was 13.80 seconds.

== Olympic career ==
The next season Grabušić lowered his personal best time to 13.54 seconds, achieved in July in Bydgoszcz. In 2004 he only ran in 13.79 seconds, but still competed in the 2004 Olympic Games, where he failed to reach the final round. In 2005 he won the bronze medal at the 2005 Mediterranean Games.

From then, Grabušić concentrated on another sport – bobsleigh. He participated in the 2006 Olympic Games as a part of the national four-man bobsleigh team. The team also consisted of 44-year-old Ivan Šola, as well as two athletics sprinters, Slaven Krajačić and Dejan Vojnović. The bobsleigh team finished in 23rd place overall.

After a quiet year in 2007, Grabušić took up the hurdles again. He ran the distance in 13.72 seconds in June 2008 in Ljubljana to qualify for his third Olympic Games. He failed to progress to the second round of the hurdles event there, but at the 2009 European Indoor Championships he reached the semi-final. His personal best time in the 110 m hurdles is still 13.54 seconds. He also has 10.36 seconds in the 100 metres, achieved in June 2008 in Rijeka; and 6.71 seconds in the 60 metres, achieved in February 2008 in Zagreb.
