= Andrijana Stipaničić =

Croatian biathlete (born 1981)

Personal information
- Full name: Andrijana Stipaničić Mrvelj
- Born: 18 September 1981 (age 44) Rijeka, Croatia (then Yugoslavia)
- Height: 1.75 m (5 ft 9 in)

Sport
- Sport: Skiing
- Club: Jarun

World Cup career
- Seasons: 2005- (Biathlon)
- Indiv. podiums: 0
- Indiv. wins: 0
- Updated on 17 March 2009

Andrijana Stipaničić Mrvelj (born 18 September 1981 in Rijeka) is a Croatian biathlete. She is the first female Croatian biathlete to win points in World Cup by winning 39th place in 15 km Individual at Biathlon World Championships 2009. She competed for Croatia at the 2010 Winter Olympics.
