= Kavach =

Kavach may refer to:

- Kavach (anti-missile system), an Indian anti-missile naval decoy system
- Kavach (train protection system), Indian Railways train protection system
- Kavach (TV series), an Indian supernatural horror drama television series
- Aarogya Setu, an Indian COVID–19 contact tracing, syndromic mapping and self-assessment digital service, formerly known as Corona Kavach

== See also ==
- Kavacham (disambiguation)
- Kvatch (disambiguation)
- Kavatch, a dialect of the Nemi language
