= Michał Zblewski =

Polish bobsledder

Michał Zblewski (born February 18, 1980, in Tczew) is a Polish bobsledder who has competed since 2004. Competing in two Winter Olympics, he earned his best finish of 14th in the four-man event at Vancouver in 2010.

Zblewski also competed in the FIBT World Championships, earning his best finish of 20th in the four-man event both at Calgary in 2005 and at St. Moritz in 2007.
