= Igor Yudin (alpine skier) =

Belarusian alpine skier (born 1957)

Personal information
- Nationality: Belarusian
- Born: 21 November 1957 Sovetskaya Gavan, Soviet Union
- Died: 17 May 2007 (aged 49)

Sport
- Sport: Alpine skiing

Igor Yudin (21 November 1957 – 17 May 2007) was a Belarusian alpine skier. He competed in the men's super-G at the 1998 Winter Olympics.
