= Kavacham =

Kavacham may refer to:

- Kavacham (1992 film), an Indian Malayalam-language film
- Kavacham (2018 film), an Indian Telugu-language action thriller film

== See also ==
- Kavach (disambiguation)
