= Dmitry Kvach =

Kazakhstani alpine skier (born 1974)

Personal information
- Native name: Дмитрий Григорьевич Квач
- Nationality: Kazakhstani
- Born: 28 June 1974 (age 52)

Sport
- Sport: Alpine skiing

Dmitry Kvach (Russian: Дмитрий Григорьевич Квач; born 28 June 1974) is a Kazakhstani alpine skier. He competed in the men's giant slalom at the 1998 Winter Olympics.
