= Dubravko Šimenc =

Croatian water polo player

Personal information
- Born: November 2, 1966 (age 59) Zagreb, Yugoslavia (now Croatia)
- Height: 201 cm (79 in)

Sport
- Sport: Water polo
Medal record
Representing Yugoslavia
Olympic Games
Gold medal – first place	1988 Seoul	Team competition
World Championships
Gold medal – first place	1986 Madrid	Team competition
Gold medal – first place	1991 Perth	Team competition
European Championships
Silver medal – second place	1985 Sofia	Team competition
Representing Croatia
Olympic Games
Silver medal – second place	1996 Atlanta	Team competition

Dubravko Šimenc (born 2 November 1966) is a former Croatian water polo player who competed for both Yugoslavia and Croatia, and later water polo coach.

Dubravko Šimenc's father Zlatko was a water polo player who won the silver medal at the 1964 Summer Olympics playing for Yugoslavia, and also a professor at the Faculty of Kinesiology. Šimenc's mother was a volleyball player. As a boy, Šimenc played many different sports. He started to play water polo in 1975.

Šimenc's first major medal was silver in the 1985 European Championships with Yugoslavia. The following year, his club Mladost won the World Champion title in Madrid.

He was given the honour to carry the national flag of Croatia at the opening ceremony of the 2004 Summer Olympics in Athens, becoming the 20th water polo player to be a flag bearer at the opening and closing ceremonies of the Olympics.

He gave support to Kolinda Grabar-Kitarović at the 2014–15 Croatian presidential election.

== See also ==
- Croatia men's Olympic water polo team records and statistics
- Yugoslavia men's Olympic water polo team records and statistics
- List of Olympic champions in men's water polo
- List of Olympic medalists in water polo (men)
- List of players who have appeared in multiple men's Olympic water polo tournaments
- List of men's Olympic water polo tournament top goalscorers
- List of flag bearers for Croatia at the Olympics
- List of world champions in men's water polo
- List of World Aquatics Championships medalists in water polo

Olympic Games
Preceded by Zoran Primorac	Flagbearer for Croatia; Athens 2004	Succeeded by Ivano Balić
