= Nikola Nimac =

Croatian skeleton racer (born 1981)

Nikola Nimac (born 8 December 1981) is a Croatian skeleton racer who has competed since 2002. He finished 26th in the men's skeleton at the 2006 Winter Olympics in Turin.
