= Ondřej Kozlovský =

Czech bobsledder

Ondřej Kozlovský (born 15 August 1982) is a Czech bobsledder who has competed since 2007. He finished 16th in the four-man event at the 2010 Winter Olympics in Vancouver. Kozlovský's best World Cup finish was 19th in the four-man event at Altenberg, Germany in December 2009.
