= Benedikt Nikpalj =

Croatian bobsledder

Personal information
- Nationality: Croatian
- Born: 6 September 1993 (age 31)

Sport
- Sport: Bobsleigh

Benedikt Nikpalj (Croatian pronunciation: [bênedikt nǐkpaʎ, - nîkpaːʎ]; Albanian: Benedikt Nikpalaj; born 6 September 1993) is a Croatian bobsledder. He competed in the two-man event at the 2018 Winter Olympics.
