= Matea Ferk =

Croatian alpine skier (born 1987)

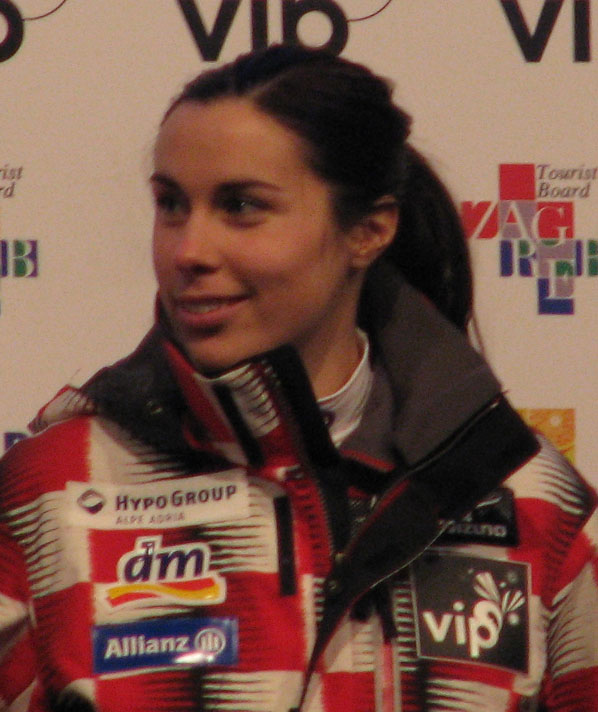
Matea Ferk

Matea Ferk (born 8 June 1987 in Rijeka) is a retired alpine skier from Croatia. She has competed for Croatia at both the 2006 and 2010 Olympics. Her best result in the Olympics was a 34th place in the slalom in 2010.
