= Frédéric Marin-Cudraz =

French alpine skier (born 1974)

Frédéric Marin-Cudraz (born 7 January 1974, in Albertville) is a retired French alpine skier, who competed in the 1998 Winter Olympics.
