= Tomislav Čižmešija =

Croatian figure skater

Personal information
- Born: 31 August 1968 (age 57) Zagreb, SR Croatia, SFR Yugoslavia

Figure skating career
- Country: Croatia; SFR Yugoslavia
- Retired: 1994

Tomislav Čižmešija (born 31 August 1968) is a Croatian retired figure skater who competed internationally for both Croatia and SFR Yugoslavia. He was Croatia's flag bearer in the opening ceremony of the 1992 Winter Olympics in Albertville, the nation's first Olympic appearance since gaining independence in 1991. Čižmešija placed 29th in men's singles. He is an ISU judge and international referee.

He is the brother of Željka Čižmešija, who competed in ladies' singles for Croatia at the 1992 Olympics.

== Results ==
International
Event	78–79 (YUG)	79–80 (YUG)	80–81 (YUG)	81–82 (YUG)	82–83 (YUG)	83–84 (YUG)	84–85 (YUG)	85–86 (YUG)	86–87 (YUG)	87–88 (YUG)	88–89 (YUG)	89–90 (YUG)	90–91 (YUG)	91–92 (CRO)	92–93 (CRO)	93–94 (CRO)
Olympics														29th		
Worlds									26th	24th			28th	27th	39th	39th
Europeans								21st	16th	21st	17th	20th	17th		23rd	33rd
Golden Spin														2nd		
International: Junior
Junior Worlds		22nd		21st	12th	WD	15th									
National
Yugoslavian Champ.	3rd	2nd	2nd	2nd	2nd	2nd	1st	1st	1st	1st	1st	1st	1st			
Croatian Champ.														1st	1st	1st

Awards and achievements
Winter Olympics
Preceded by none	Flagbearer for Croatia; Albertville 1992	Succeeded by Vedran Pavlek
