= Kvetch =

Kvetch may be:

- Kvetch, an English word of Yiddish origin meaning 'to gripe', 'someone who complains habitually'
- Kvetch (play), 1991 play by Steven Berkoff
