= Perica Bukić =

Croatian water polo player

Personal information
- Born: Perica Bukić; 20 February 1966 (age 60) Šibenik, SFR Yugoslavia
Medal record
Men's water polo
Representing Yugoslavia
Olympic Games
Gold medal – first place	1984 Los Angeles	Team competition
Gold medal – first place	1988 Seoul	Team competition
World Championships
Gold medal – first place	1986 Madrid	Team competition
Gold medal – first place	1991 Perth	Team competition
European Championships
Silver medal – second place	1985 Sofia	Team competition
Silver medal – second place	1987 Strasbourg	Team competition
Representing Croatia
Olympic Games
Silver medal – second place	1996 Atlanta	Team competition

Perica Bukić (born 20 February 1966) is a Croatian former professional water polo player and politician. He represented Yugoslavia at the 1984 and 1988 Summer Olympics.

Bukić was given the honour to carry the national flag of Croatia at the opening ceremony of the 1996 Summer Olympics in Atlanta, becoming the 17th water polo player to be a flag bearer at the opening and closing ceremonies of the Olympics.

Bukić was educated at the University of Zagreb, from which he received a degree in economics.

During his active water polo years, he played for Solaris Šibenik, Mladost Zagreb, and Jadran Split. He later became the sports director of "Mladost" Zagreb.

Bukić is a member of the Croatian Democratic Union. In the 2003 Croatian parliamentary election he attained a seat in the Croatian Parliament. In the 2007 Croatian parliamentary election he retained his seat. His term of office in the Parliament ended in January 2008.

In 2004 he was elected as the president of the Croatian Water Polo Federation, the sport's governing body in Croatia.

In July 2008 Bukić was inducted into the International Swimming Hall of Fame.

His son is Luka Bukić, who is also a water polo player.

== See also ==
- Croatia men's Olympic water polo team records and statistics
- Yugoslavia men's Olympic water polo team records and statistics
- List of Olympic champions in men's water polo
- List of Olympic medalists in water polo (men)
- List of flag bearers for Croatia at the Olympics
- List of world champions in men's water polo
- List of World Aquatics Championships medalists in water polo
- List of members of the International Swimming Hall of Fame

Awards and achievements
Olympic Games
Preceded by Goran Ivanišević	Flagbearer for Croatia; Atlanta 1996	Succeeded by Zoran Primorac
