= Henry Nwume =

Zambian-born, British bobsledder (born 1977)

Henry Odili Nwume (born 10 January 1977) is a Zambian-born, British bobsledder who has competed since 2006. At the 2010 Winter Olympics in Vancouver, he finished 17th in the four-man event. He studied at Brasenose College, Oxford. Nwume was born in Lusaka.
