= Andrey Yurkov =

Russian bobsledder (born 1983)

Andrey Yurkov (sometimes listed as Andrey Jurkov, born 18 November 1983) is a Russian bobsledder who has competed since 2007. His best World Cup finish was third in a four-man event at Altenberg, Germany in December 2009.

Yurkov's team finished eighth in the four-man bobsleigh competition at the 2010 Winter Olympics in Turin.
