= Alen Abramović =

Croatian cross-country skier (born 1976)

Personal information
- Nationality: Croatian
- Born: 4 November 1976 (age 48); Rijeka, Croatia
- Height: 1.80 m (5 ft 11 in)
- Weight: 72 kg (159 lb)

Sport
- Sport: Cross-country skiing

Alen Abramović (born 4 November 1976) is a Croatian cross-country skier. He competed in the 2006 Winter Olympics.
