= Pāvels Tulubjevs =

Latvian bobsledder (born 1985)

Pāvels Tulubjevs (born 2 July 1985) is a Latvian bobsledder who has competed since 2007.

He finished 11th in the four-man event at the 2010 Winter Olympics in Vancouver.
