= Venio Losert =

Croatian handball player (born 1976)

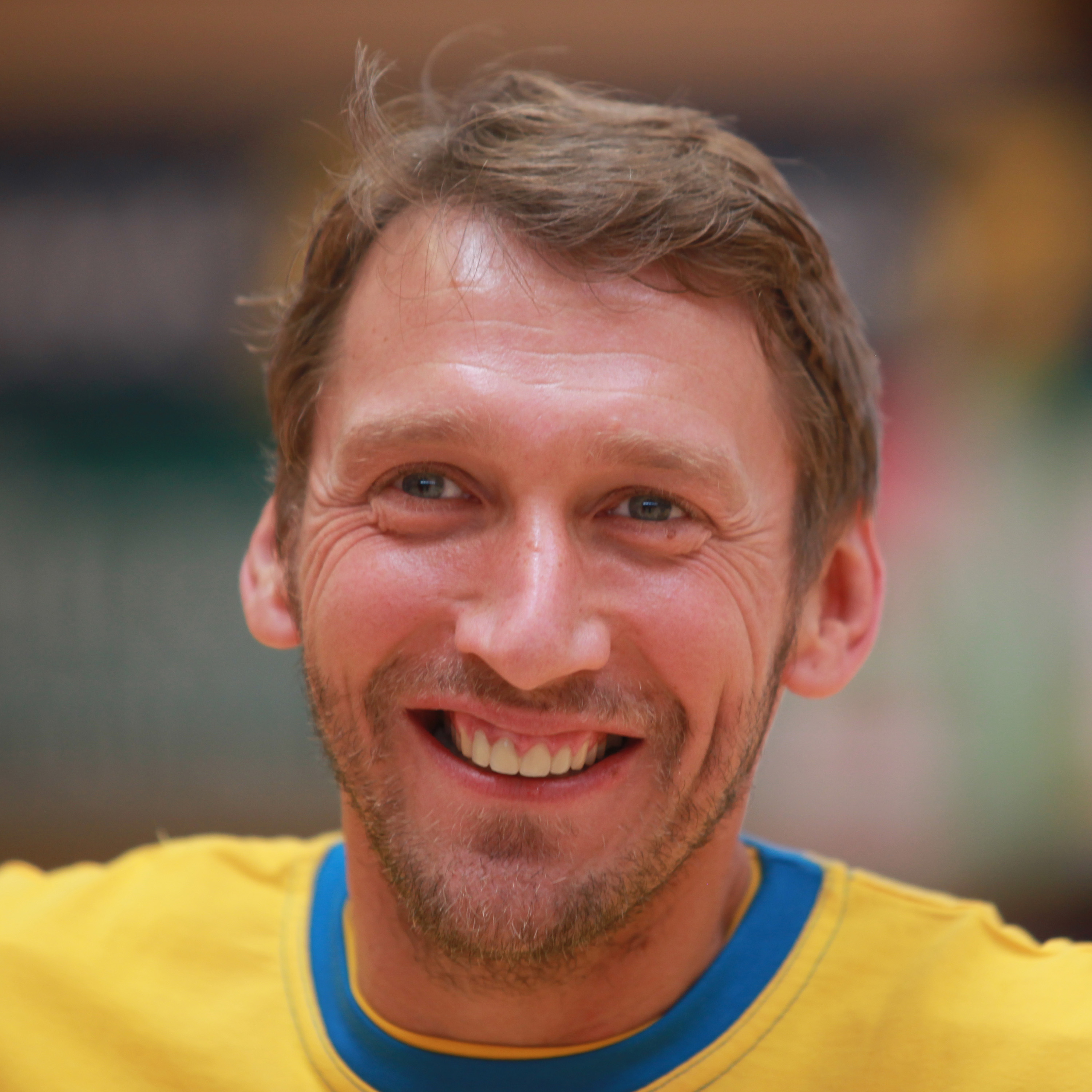
- Losert in 2013 with Targi Kielce

Personal information
- Nationality: Croatian
- Born: 25 July 1976 (age 50) Zavidovići, SR Bosnia and Herzegovina, Yugoslavia
- Height: 1.91 m (6 ft 3 in)

Sport
- Sport: Handball
- Position: Goalkeeper
- Current club: Egypt (GK coach)

Senior clubs
- Years: Team
- 1993–1999: Badel 1862 Zagreb
- 1999–2000: Garbel Saragosse
- 2000–2001: Teka Cantabria
- 2001–2004: BM Granollers
- 2004–2005: Portland San Antonio
- 2005–2006: CB Cangas
- 2006–2009: Barcelona
- 2009–2010: Créteil
- 2010–2012: Ademar León
- 2012: Copenhague
- 2013–2014: Vive Targi Kielce
- 2014: Montpellier
National team
Years	Team	Apps	(Gls)
1995–2014	Croatia	211	(0)

Teams managed
- –: Veszprém (GK coach)
- 2017–2018: Croatia (GK coach)
- 2018–: Egypt (GK coach)
- 2022: RK Vardar 1961 (GK coach)
- 2022–: Al Ahly (GK coach)
Medal record
Olympic Games
Gold medal – first place	1996 Atlanta	Team
Gold medal – first place	2004 Athens	Team
Bronze medal – third place	2012 London	Team
World Championship
Silver medal – second place	1995 Iceland	Team
Silver medal – second place	2005 Tunisia	Team
Silver medal – second place	2009 Croatia	Team
European Championship
Bronze medal – third place	2012 Serbia	Team
Bronze medal – third place	2016 Poland	GK coach

Venio Losert (born 25 July 1976) is a Croatian former handball player who played as a goalkeeper. He is currently the goalkeeping coach of Egypt and Al Ahly.

Losert was born in Zavidovići, SR Bosnia and Herzegovina, grew up in Slavonski Brod, SR Croatia.

Winning the first medal at the age of 19 at 1996 Summer Olympics in Atlanta, when Croatia won the first gold medal as an independent nation, he is considered the youngest debutant of the team.

Losert was also a member of the golden national handball team that won first place at the 2004 Summer Olympics in Athens.

As a child, he joined Badel Zagreb, the strongest team in the country, and was part of the team that won the European Cup in 1992 and 1993. In total, he won seven league titles and seven cups with Badel Zagreb. In 1999, Venio Losert moved into Spanish handball, signing for Garbel Zaragoza (1999–2000). He later played for various ASOBAL League teams including Teka Cantabria (2000–01), BM Granollers (2001–04), Portland San Antonio (2004–05), and Cangas Frigoríficos del Morrazo. In the Portland team he won the ASOBAL League title.

As one of the best goalkeepers, with plenty of honours in the game, Venio Losert was given the honour to be the flag bearer in London 2012. Unlike other icons of handball, Losert has always called himself a "normal, regular and not a showy keeper who only does what's needed to keep the ball out". Losert has always been a key part of the Croatian national team, winning also silver medals in the 1995 and 2005 World Championships. He was voted Croatian player of the year in 1997.

In 2016, he became the goalkeeping coach of Croatian national team in the staff of Željko Babić.

== Honours ==
Badel 1862 Zagreb

- Croatian First League (6): 1993–94, 1994–95, 1995–96, 1996–97, 1997–98, 1998–99
- Croatian Cup (6): 1994, 1995, 1996, 1997, 1998, 1999
- EHF Champions League
  - Runner-up (4): 1995, 1997, 1998, 1999

Granollers

- EHF Cup
  - Runner-up (1): 2002

Portland San Antonio

- Liga ASOBAL (1): 2004–05
- Supercopa ASOBAL (1): 2004–05

Barcelona

- Copa del Rey (2): 2007, 2009
- Supercopa ASOBAL (2): 2007, 2009
- Pirenees Leagues (2): 2006–07, 2007–08

Individual

- Franjo Bučar State Award for Sport: 1996 and 2004
- Best Croatian handballer of 1998 by: CHF & Sportske novosti

Olympic Games
Preceded by Ivano Balić	Flagbearer for Croatia; London 2012	Succeeded by Josip Pavić
