= Bernhard Knauß =

Austrian-Slovenian alpine skier (born 1965)

Bernhard Knauß (born 25 June 1965 in Schladming) is an Austrian and later Slovenian former alpine skier who competed in the 1998 Winter Olympics and won the U.S. Pro-Ski Tour several times.
