= Igor Marić (bobsleigh) =

Croatian bobsledder (born 1982)

Igor Marić (born 15 August 1982 in Split) is a Croatian bobsledder who has competed since 2008. At the 2010 Winter Olympics in Vancouver, he finished 20th in the four-man event.

Marić's best finish is sixth in a lesser event in Calgary in December 2009.
