= Daria Obratov =

Croatian luger

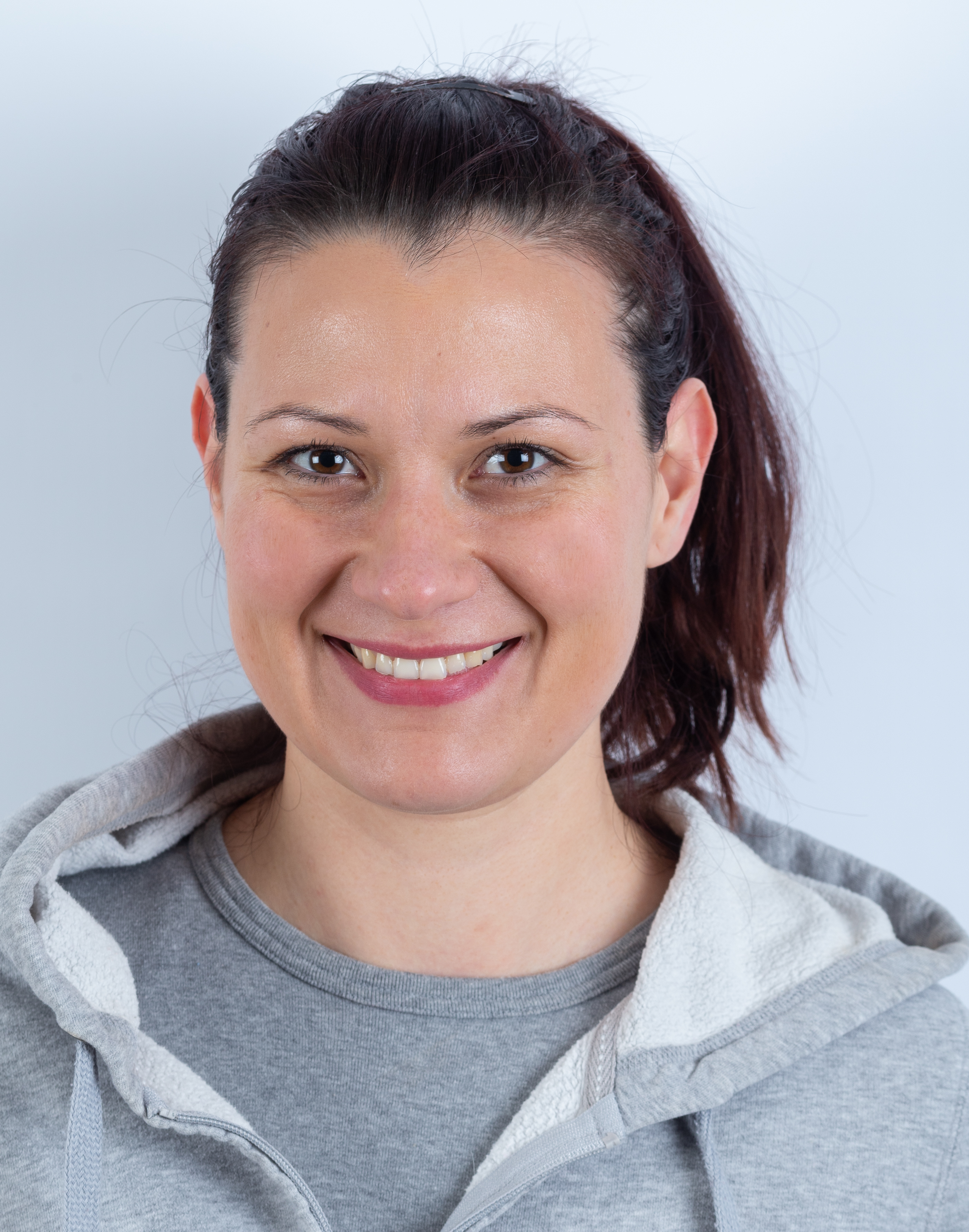
- Daria Obratov in 2018

Personal information
- Nationality: Croatian / Dutch
- Born: 12 December 1989 (age 35); Split, SR Croatia, SFR Yugoslavia

Sport
- Sport: Luge

Daria Obratov (Croatian pronunciation: [ǒbratoʋ]; born 12 December 1989) is a Croatian luger. She competed in the women's singles event at the 2018 Winter Olympics.

She used to play handball in her youth, but after knee injury and 8 operations, she took up luge. She failed to qualify to 2010 and 2014 Olympics.

By qualifying for the 2018 Winter Olympics she became the first Croatian luger to compete at the Winter Olympics. She finished 27th in the singles category.

Seven months later, in September 2018, she announced plans to leave Croatia to continue training in the Netherlands and also compete for that country.

Her first competition for Netherlands was the 2018–19 Luge World Cup where she finished 29th overall.
