= Slaven Krajačić =

Croatian sprinter (born 1980)

Slaven Krajačić (born 14 September 1980) is a Croatian sportsperson. He started his career as a sprinter specializing in the 100 metres, and competed at the 2000 Olympic Games. Since 2003, he has competed as a bobsledder, competing in two Winter Olympics, earning his best finish of 20th in the four-man event at Vancouver in 2010.

== Athletics career ==
He was born in Zagreb, and enrolled the sports club Hrvatski Akademski Atletski Klub Mladost, the athletics section of Mladost. He became Croatian 100 metres champion in 2000, and 60 metres indoor champion in 2001.

In 1998 he reached the quarter-final of the 1998 World Junior Championships. His first major senior event was the 2000 Olympic Games. He competed in the 100 metres event, but did not progress from the first round. He also competed with the Croatian team in the 4 × 100 metre relay, but was knocked out in the heats there as well.

His personal best time was 10.47 seconds, achieved in the heats at the 1998 World Junior Championships. He also has 6.68 seconds in the 60 metres, achieved in February 2001 in Šempeter, Slovenia. He came close to his personal best time on several occasions, running seasons bests of 10.50 seconds in 2000 and 10.48 seconds in 2002. However, he retired from international athletics after the 2002 season.

== Bobsleigh career ==
After his retirement from athletics, Krajačić took up bobsleigh, participating in the 2006 Winter Olympics in Turin, as a part of the national four-man bobsleigh team. The team also consisted of 44-year-old Ivan Šola, as well as two athletes, Jurica Grabušić and Dejan Vojnović. Krajačić had been a teammate of Vojnović in the 2000 Olympic relay race. The bobsleigh team finished in 23rd place overall. Four years later in Vancouver, Krajačić finished 20th in the four-man event.

His best finish at the FIBT World Championships was 24th in the four-man event at Calgary in 2005. That same year, Krajačić earned his best finish in a World Cup with a 23rd-place finish in the four-man event at Lake Placid, New York.
