= Siniša Vukonić =

Croatian cross-country skier (born 1971)

Personal information
- Nationality: Croatian
- Born: 4 October 1971 (age 53); Rijeka, Yugoslavia

Sport
- Sport: Cross-country skiing

Siniša Vukonić (born 4 October 1971) is a Croatian cross-country skier. He competed at the 1992 Winter Olympics and the 1994 Winter Olympics.
