= Andrey Filichkin =

Russian alpine skier (born 1975)

Andrey Filichkin (born 17 January 1975) is a Russian former alpine skier who competed in the 1994 Winter Olympics, 1998 Winter Olympics, and 2002 Winter Olympics.
