= Antonio Rački =

Croatian cross-country skier (1973–2024)

Personal information
- Nationality: Croatian
- Born: 18 December 1973; Rijeka, SR Croatia, Yugoslavia
- Died: 9 February 2024 (aged 50); Rijeka, Croatia

Sport
- Sport: Cross-country skiing

Antonio Rački (18 December 1973 – 9 February 2024) was a Croatian cross-country skier. He competed at the 1994 Winter Olympics and the 1998 Winter Olympics.

Rački died in a road collision in Rijeka, on 9 February 2024, at the age of 50.
