= Thomas Lödler =

Austrian-Croatian alpine skier (born 1973)

Personal information
- Nationality: Croatian
- Born: 5 May 1973 (age 53) Čakovec, SR Croatia, SFR Yugoslavia

Sport
- Sport: Alpine skiing

Thomas Lödler (born 5 May 1973) is an Austrian-Croatian alpine skier. He competed in two events at the 1998 Winter Olympics.
