= Andrea Komšić =

Croatian alpine skier (born 1996)

Andrea Komšić (born May 4, 1996) is a Croatian former alpine skier.

She skied in the 2018 Olympics in Pyeongchang, Korea and the 2014 Olympics in Sochi, Russia.

Komšić was born in Kiseljak, in Bosnia and Herzegovina. She debuted in Zagreb in 2013. As of 2020, she has 13 FIS wins (8 in slalom, 3 in giant slalom, 1 in super G, and 1 in alpine combined). In FIS Alpine World Ski Championships 2013 she won 36th place in downhill, and 47th place in slalom.

She also skied as an all-American for the University of Denver, helping the Pioneers to the 2018 NCAA title.
