= Lee Jin-hee (bobsledder) =

South Korean bobsledder

- Hangul: 이진희
- RR: I Jinhui
- MR: I Chinhŭi

Lee Jin-hee (born April 20, 1984) is a South Korean bobsledder who has competed since 2007. At the 2010 Winter Olympics in Vancouver, he finished 19th in the four-man event.

Lee's best finish at the FIBT World Championships was 20th in the four-man event at Lake Placid, New York, in 2009. His best World Cup finish was 20th in the four-man event at Whistler, British Columbia, in 2009.

== Education ==
- Kangnung National University
