= Renato Gašpar =

Croatian alpine skier (born 1977)

Personal information
- Nationality: Croatian
- Born: 29 July 1977 (age 48); Zagreb, SR Croatia, SFR Yugoslavia

Sport
- Sport: Alpine skiing

Renato Gašpar (born 29 July 1977) is a Croatian alpine skier. He competed in two events at the 1998 Winter Olympics.
