= Vedran Pavlek =

Croatian alpine skier (born 1973)

Personal information
- Nationality: Croatian
- Born: 27 April 1973 (age 53) Zagreb, SR Croatia, SFR Yugoslavia
- Occupations: Alpine ski racer and executive
- Years active: from 1992

Sport
- Country: Croatia
- Sport: alpine skiing
- Position: slalom, giant slalom
- Club: ski club "SK Zagreb"
- Coached by: Ozren Müller, Slaviša Weiner
- Retired: 1998

Vedran Pavlek (born 27 April 1973 in Zagreb) is a former Croatian World Cup Alpine ski racer.

== Life and career ==
Vedran Pavlek is a former Alpine racer who himself participated in three Olympic Winter Games and three FIS Alpine World Ski Championships as well as numerous FIS Ski World Cup events. He was an olympic flag bearer for Croatia at the 1994 Winter Olympics in Lillehammer. Pavlek has also been Member of the FIS Alpine Executive Board since 2008 and General Manager of the Organizing Committee of the Audi FIS Alpine Ski World Cup slalom races in Zagreb since 2005. Furthermore, he led the Croatian Alpine Ski Team at three editions of the Olympic Winter Games (2002, 2006, 2010) where the team won a total of four gold medals and five silver medals. Pavlek has studied business administration and management at the University of Zagreb.

== Allegations of corruption ==
In late March 2026, Croatian media published reports on a potential corruption scandal, alleging that Pavlek may have been the mastermind and ringleader of a wide-spread systemic corruption network stemming from the Croatian Ski Association. Pavlek acted as Director of the Croatian Alpine Ski Team and the Croatian Alpine Ski Pool between 1998 and 2026.

Data collected in the currently ongoing investigation suggests that over the course of twenty years, Pavlek and his accomplices embezzled funds totaling close to 30 million euros, defrauding the Ski Association and sponsors who had supported its work and efforts. The money laundering operation allegedly involved companies in Croatia, Serbia, Hungary, Slovakia, Austria, Italy, San Marino, Liechtenstein, Switzerland, Monaco, Spain, Russia, United Arab Emirates, and Saint Kitts and Nevis which had, allegedly, processed hundreds, if not thousands, of fictitious financial transactions.

At the time when allegations against Pavlek were published by the media, he was on a business trip in Istanbul, staying at a luxury hotel. On 27 March, he was visited by the Turkish police who seized a number of his personal items, including a laptop, six mobile phones, and ten USB flash drives. On 28 March, upon the request of the Croatian government, Interpol issued an arrest warrant for Pavlek, but by that point, he had already fled to Dubai where he spent almost three weeks, before traveling to Almaty where he spent another two weeks in hiding. He was detained by Kazakh authorities on 7 May. Croatian authorities submitted an extradition request for Pavlek in early June. On 10 June, the Kazakh authorities acknowledged receipt of the request and confirmed that Pavlek would remain in detention for at least twelve moths, while relevant authorities go through all processes pertinent to the extradition request.

Awards and achievements
Winter Olympics
Preceded by Tomislav Čižmešija	Flagbearer for Croatia; Lillehammer 1994	Succeeded by Janica Kostelić
