= Ivan Šola =

Croatian motorcycle racer and bobsledder

Ivan Šola (born 12 December 1961) is a Croatian bobsledder who has competed since 1999. Competing in three Winter Olympics, he earned his best finish of 20th in the four-man event at Vancouver in 2010.

Šola also competed in the FIBT World Championships, earning his best finish of 24th in the four-man event at Calgary in 2005.

Prior to his bobsleigh career, Šola was a multiple Croatian champion in motorcycle racing. In 2003, Šola also competed in Formula 2000 speedboat races. As of 2002, he was an owner of a motorcycle shop and a driving school. In 2007 he was elected member of the board of the Croatian Motorcycling Federation.

As of 2011, Šola is the president of the Croatian Bobsleigh and Skeleton Federation.
