= Croatian Olympic Committee =

National Olympic Committee

- Country: Croatia
- Code: CRO
- Created: 10 September 1991
- Recognized: 17 January 1992 (provisional); 24 September 1993 (full membership)
- Continental Association: EOC
- Headquarters: Zagreb, Croatia
- President: Josip Varvodić
- Website: hoo.hr

The Croatian Olympic Committee (Croatian: Hrvatski olimpijski odbor, HOO; IOC Code: CRO) is the non-profit organization representing Croatian athletes in the International Olympic Committee. The COC organizes Croatia's representatives at the Summer and Winter Olympic Games. It also organizes the Croatian contingent at smaller events such as the Mediterranean Games.

44 sports federations are members of the committee which elect the Executive Council composed of the president and 15 members.

In 2006, the COC organized the first Croatian World Games in Zadar. These games gather various groups of diaspora Croats against contingents from Croatia and Bosnia and Herzegovina.

== History ==
The Croatian Olympic Committee was founded on 10 September 1991 in Zagreb. IOC temporally recognised the Committee on 17 January 1992, which led the way to Croatian athletes to participate in the Olympics. They participated for the first time in the 1992 Winter Olympics in Albertville and 1992 Summer Olympics in Barcelona. Full recognition by the IOC was on 24 September 1993.

== Personnel ==
=== Presidents ===
President	Term
Antun Vrdoljak	1991–2000
Zdravko Hebel	2000–2002
Zlatko Mateša	2002–2026
Josip Varvodić	2026–present

=== IOC members ===
Member	Term
Franjo Bučar	1920–1946
Boris Bakrač	1960–1987
Antun Vrdoljak	1995–2014
Kolinda Grabar-Kitarović	2020–present

=== Executive committee ===
The 2026–2028 committee of HOO consists of:

- President: Josip Varvodić
- Member of IOC in Croatia: Kolinda Grabar-Kitarović
- Vice Presidents: Frane Žanić, Milivoj Bebić, Suzana Šop, and Željko Kisić
- Members: Nikola Rukavina, Mladen Drnasin, Vedran Šupuković, Stipe Pletikosa, Mladen Mikolčević, Ante Filipović, Robert Markt, Barbara Đinović, Snježana Jurinić, Dragutin Kamenski, Antonio Zujić, Damir Hrupec, Željko Banić, Lucian Vukelić, Damir Knjaz, Marko Badrić, and Marko Kallay

== Member federations ==
Flag of the Croatian Olympic Committee

The Croatian National Federations are the organizations that coordinate all aspects of their individual sports. They are responsible for training, competition and development of their sports. There are currently 37 Olympic Summer and 7 Winter Sport Federations in Croatia.

National Federation	Summer or Winter	Headquarters
Croatian Archery Federation	Summer	Zagreb
Croatian Athletics Federation	Summer	Zagreb
Croatian Badminton Association	Summer	Zagreb
Croatian Baseball Association	Summer	Zagreb
Croatian Basketball Federation	Summer	Zagreb
Croatian Biathlon Federation	Winter	Zagreb
Croatian Bobsleigh and Skeleton Federation	Winter	Split
Croatian Boxing Federation	Summer	Zagreb
Croatian Canoe Federation	Summer	Zagreb
Croatian Curling Federation	Winter	Zagreb
Croatian Cycling Federation	Summer	Zagreb
Croatian Diving Federation	Summer	Zagreb
Croatian Equestrian Federation	Summer	Zagreb
Croatian Fencing Federation	Summer	Zagreb
Croatian Football Federation	Summer	Zagreb
Croatian Gymnastics Federation	Summer	Zagreb
Croatian Golf Federation	Summer	Zagreb
Croatian Handball Federation	Summer	Zagreb
Croatian Hockey Federation	Summer	Zagreb
Croatian Ice Hockey Association	Winter	Zagreb
Croatian Judo Federation	Summer	Zagreb
Croatian Karate Federation	Summer	Zagreb
Croatian Long Distance Swimming Federation	Summer	Stari Grad
Croatian Luge Federation	Winter	Split
Croatian Modern Pentathlon Federation	Summer	Zagreb
Croatian Mountaineering Association	Summer	Zagreb
Croatian Roller Skating Association	Summer	Zagreb
Croatian Rowing Federation	Summer	Zagreb
Croatian Rugby Union	Summer	Zagreb
Croatian Sailing Federation	Summer	Split
Croatian Shooting Federation	Summer	Zagreb
Croatian Skating Federation	Winter	Zagreb
Croatian Ski Association	Winter	Zagreb
Croatian Softball Association	Summer	Zagreb
Croatian Swimming Federation	Summer	Zagreb
Croatian Synchronized Swimming Federation	Summer	Zagreb
Croatian Table Tennis Association	Summer	Zagreb
Croatian Taekwondo Federation	Summer	Zagreb
Croatian Tennis Association	Summer	Zagreb
Croatian Triathlon Federation	Summer	Zagreb
Croatian Volleyball Federation	Summer	Zagreb
Croatian Water Polo Federation	Summer	Zagreb
Croatian Weightlifting Federation	Summer	Split
Croatian Wrestling Association	Summer	Zagreb

== See also ==
- Croatia at the Olympics
