= List of flag bearers for Montenegro at the Olympics =

Montenegro at the Olympics
- IOC code: MNE
- NOC: Montenegrin Olympic Committee
- Website: www.cok.me(in Montenegrin)
- Medals: Gold 0 Silver 1 Bronze 0 Total 1

Summer appearances
- 2008; 2012; 2016; 2020; 2024

Winter appearances
- 2010; 2014; 2018; 2022; 2026

Other related appearances
- Yugoslavia (1920–1992W); Independent Olympic Participants (1992S); Serbia and Montenegro (1996–2006)

This is a list of flag bearers who have represented Montenegro at the Olympics.

== List of flag bearers ==
Flag bearers carry the national flag of their country at the opening ceremony of the Olympic Games.

Key

Born outside of Montenegro

#	Event year	Season	Ceremony	Flag bearer	Sex	Municipality	Sport
1	2008	Summer	Opening	Veljko Uskoković	M	Cetinje	Water polo
2	2010	Winter	Opening	Bojan Kosić	M	Nikšić	Alpine skiing
3	2012	Summer	Opening	Srđan Mrvaljević	M	SR Serbia (now Serbia)	Judo
4	2014	Winter	Opening	Tarik Hadžić	M	Rožaje	Alpine skiing
5	2016	Summer	Opening	Bojana Popović	F	SR Serbia (now Serbia)	Handball
6	2018	Winter	Opening	Jelena Vujičić	F	Pljevlja	Alpine skiing
7	2020	Summer	Opening	Draško Brguljan	M	Kotor	Water polo
8	2020	Summer	Opening	Jovanka Radičević	F	Podgorica	Handball
9	2022	Winter	Opening	Eldar Salihović	M	Pljevlja	Alpine skiing
10	2022	Winter	Opening	Jelena Vujičić	F	Pljevlja	Alpine skiing
11	2024	Summer	Opening	Milivoj Dukić	M	Cetinje	Sailing
12	2024	Summer	Opening	Danka Kovinić	F	Cetinje	Tennis

== See also ==
- Montenegro at the Olympics
- List of flag bearers for Yugoslavia at the Olympics
- List of flag bearers for Serbia and Montenegro at the Olympics
