= List of Serbian sportspeople =

This is a partial list of Serbian sportspeople. For the full plainlist of Serbian sportspeople on Wikipedia, see Category:Serbian sportspeople.

== Alpine skiing ==
- Jelena Lolović - Universiade Champion
- Nevena Ignjatović - Universiade Champion
- Marko Đorđević
- Marija Trmčić
- Strahinja Stanišić
- Želimir Vuković

== Athletics ==
- Franjo Mihalić - Olympic medalist
- Ivan Gubijan - Olympic medalist
- Ivana Španović - Olympic medalist
- Vera Nikolić - 2 times European Champion, former world record holder in 800m
- Emir Bekrić
- Dragutin Topić
- Dragan Perić
- Snežana Pajkić
- Miloš Srejović
- Nenad Stekić
- Olivera Jevtić
- Olga Gere
- Biljana Petrović
- Asmir Kolašinac
- Slobodan Branković
- Dragan Zdravković
- Vladimir Milić
- Mihail Dudaš
- Jovan Lazarević
- Biljana Topić
- Amela Terzić
- Tatjana Jelača
- Armin Sinančević
- Adriana Vilagoš
- Angelina Topić

== Auto racing ==
- Bill Vukovich
- Bill Vukovich II
- Billy Vukovich III
- Pete Romcevich
- Dušan Borković
- Miloš Pavlović

== Basketball ==
=== Players ===
==== Male ====
- Radivoj Korać - Olympic medalist
- Dražen Dalipagić - Olympic, and medalist
- Dragan Kićanović - Olympic and medalist
- Zoran Slavnić - Olympic and medalist
- Ratko Radovanović - Olympic and medalist
- Vlade Divac - 2 x Olympic medalist
- Žarko Paspalj - 2 x Olympic medalist
- Dragutin Čermak - Olympic medalist
- Vladimir Cvetković - Olympic medalist
- Zoran Marojević - Olympic medalist
- Trajko Rajković - Olympic medalist
- Dragoslav Ražnatović - Olympic medalist
- Željko Obradović - Olympic medalist
- Dejan Bodiroga - Olympic medalist
- Aleksandar Đorđević - Olympic medalist
- Dejan Tomašević - Olympic medalist
- Miroslav Berić - Olympic medalist
- Željko Rebrača - Olympic medalist
- Predrag Danilović - Olympic medalist
- Saša Obradović - Olympic medalist
- Zoran Savić - Olympic medalist
- Nikola Lončar - Olympic medalist
- Milenko Topić - Olympic medalist
- Nebojša Zorkić - Olympic medalist
- Borislav Stanković
- Dragan Kapičić
- Ljubodrag Simonović
- Zoran Radović
- Radisav Ćurčić - Serbian-Israeli basketball player, 1999 Israeli Basketball Premier League MVP
- Zoran Sretenović
- Dragan Lukovski
- Peja Stojaković
- Vladimir Radmanović
- Dejan Koturović
- Sasha Pavlović
- Dragan Tarlać
- Marko Jarić
- Miloš Vujanić
- Milan Gurović
- Igor Rakočević
- Darko Miličić
- Nenad Krstić
- Miloš Teodosić
- Duško Savanović
- Novica Veličković
- Nemanja Bjelica
- Nikola Pekovic
- Bogdan Bogdanovic
- Nikola Jokić - Olympic medalist, 2021 NBA Most Valuable Player Award

==== Female ====
- Anđelija Arbutina - Olympic medalist
- Slađana Golić - Olympic medalist
- Bojana Milošević - Olympic medalist
- Eleonora Wild - Olympic medalist
- Vera Đurašković - Olympic medalist
- Jelica Komnenović - Olympic medalist
- Vukica Mitić - Olympic medalist
- Sofija Pekić - Olympic medalist
- Marija Tonković - Olympic medalist
- Zorica Đurković - Olympic medalist
- Vesna Despotović - Olympic medalist
- Biljana Majstorović - Olympic medalist
- Jasmina Perazić - Olympic medalist
- Gordana Grubin - former WNBA player
- Sonja Petrović - former WNBA player
- Miljana Bojović
- Ivana Matović
- Milica Dabović
- Ivanka Matić
- Jelena Milovanović
- Ana Dabović
- Tamara Radočaj

=== Coaches ===
- Dušan Ivković
- Željko Obradović
- Ranko Žeravica
- Aleksandar Nikolić
- Svetislav Pešić
- Božidar Maljković
- Milan Opačić
- Igor Kokoškov
- Rajko Toroman

=== Referees ===
- Obrad Belošević

== Biathlon ==
- Milanko Petrović
- Emir Hrkalović

== Bobsleigh ==
- Vuk Rađenović
- Pavle Jovanovic
- Damjan Zlatnar
- Slobodan Matijević
- Miloš Savić
- Igor Šarčević

== Boxing ==
- Slobodan Kačar - Olympic medalist
- Tadija Kačar - Olympic medalist
- Mirko Puzović - Olympic medalist
- Zvonimir Vujin - 2 x Olympic medalist
- Svetomir Belić
- Sreten Mirković
- Ljubiša Simić
- Nenad Borovčanin

== Canoeing ==
- Mirko Nišović - Olympic and medalist
- Milan Janić - Olympic medalist
- Ognjen Filipović
- Dragan Zorić
- Milan Đenadić
- Bora Sibinkić
- Marko Novaković
- Dejan Pajić
- Dusko Stanojević
- Antonija Nađ
- Antonija Panda
- Marta Tibor
- Renata Kubik
- Miljana Knežević

== Curling ==
- Đorđe Nešković

== Cycling ==
- Veselin Petrović
- Ivan Stević
- Nebojša Jovanović
- Gabor Kasa
- Jovana Crnogorac

== Fencing ==
- Vera Jeftimijades
- Tamara Savić-Šotra

== Figure skating ==
- Trifun Živanović

== Football ==
=== Players ===
==== Male ====
- Aleksandar Tirnanić
- Blagoje Marjanović
- Milovan Jakšić
- Rajko Mitić - 2 x Olympic medalist
- Branko Stanković - 2 x Olympic medalist
- Kosta Tomašević - 2 x Olympic medalist
- Aleksandar Atanacković - Olympic medalist
- Prvoslav Mihajlović - Olympic medalist
- Ljubomir Lovrić - Olympic medalist
- Bela Palfi - Olympic medalist
- Aleksandar Petrović - Olympic medalist
- Vladimir Beara - Olympic medalist
- Tihomir Ognjanov - Olympic medalist
- Vujadin Boškov - Olympic medalist
- Ratko Čolić - Olympic medalist
- Zdravko Rajkov - Olympic medalist
- Miloš Milutinović - 1955–56 UEFA Champions League Top Scorer
- Ljubiša Spajić - Olympic medalist
- Dobrosav Krstić - Olympic medalist
- Sava Antić - Olympic medalist
- Petar Radenković - Olympic medalist
- Vladica Popović - Olympic medalist
- Dragoslav Šekularac - Olympic medalist
- Todor Veselinović - Olympic medalist
- Blagoje Vidinić - Olympic and medalist
- Milutin Šoškić - Olympic medalist
- Vladimir Durković - Olympic medalist
- Žarko Nikolić - Olympic medalist
- Bora Kostić - Olympic medalist
- Novak Roganović - Olympic medalist
- Velimir Sombolac - Olympic medalist
- Silvester Takač - Olympic medalist, 1971–72 UEFA Champions League Top Scorer
- Dušan Maravić - Olympic medalist
- Milan Galić - Olympic medalist
- Jovan Miladinović
- Vladica Kovačević - 1963–64 UEFA Champions League Top Scorer
- Dragan Džajić - 1968. Ballon d'Or 3rd place
- Ilija Pantelić
- Milan Damjanović
- Borivoje Đorđević
- Blagoje Paunović
- Ilija Petković
- Rajko Aleksić
- Miroslav Pavlović
- Dušan Savić
- Jovan Aćimović
- Dobrivoje Trivić
- Ljubomir Mihajlović
- Velibor Vasović
- Dušan Bajević
- Vladimir Petrović
- Dragan Mance
- Borislav Cvetković - Olympic medalist, 1986–87 UEFA Champions League Top Scorer
- Jovica Nikolić - Olympic medalist
- Mitar Mrkela - Olympic medalist
- Dragan Stojković - Olympic medalist
- Stevan Stojanović
- Milinko Pantić - 1996–97 UEFA Champions League Top Scorer
- Vladimir Jugović
- Siniša Mihajlović
- Zoran Mirković
- Slaviša Jokanović
- Savo Milošević
- Darko Kovačević
- Dejan Stanković
- Dejan Petković
- Mateja Kežman
- Ivica Dragutinović
- Marko Pantelić
- Nikola Žigić
- Nemanja Vidić
- Branislav Ivanović
- Aleksandar Kolarov
- Miloš Krasić
- Zdravko Kuzmanović
- Neven Subotić
- Nemanja Matić
- Dušan Tadić

==== Female ====
- Jelena Čanković
- Jovana Damnjanović
- Marija Radojičić
- Susanne Nilsson
- Danka Podovac
- Vesna Smiljković

=== Coaches ===
- Ljupko Petrović - UEFA European Cup/Champions League winning manager
- Bora Milutinović
- Miljan Miljanić
- Vujadin Boškov
- Radomir Antić
- Milovan Rajevac
- Slobodan Santrač
- Branko Stanković
- Dragoslav Stepanović
- Ivan Jovanović
- Miroslav Đukić

== Golf ==
- Zoran Zorkic

== Gymnastics ==
- Tereza Kočiš
- Mirjana Bilić
- Milena Reljin
- Danijela Simić

== Handball ==
=== Male ===
- Momir Rnić - Olympic and medalist
- Slobodan Kuzmanovski - Olympic and medalist
- Zoran Živković - Olympic medalist
- Đorđe Lavrnić - Olympic medalist
- Slobodan Mišković - Olympic medalist
- Branislav Pokrajac - Olympic medalist
- Nebojša Popović - Olympic medalist
- Milan Lazarević - Olympic medalist
- Petar Fajfrić - Olympic medalist
- Milorad Karalić - Olympic medalist
- Zlatan Arnautović - Olympic medalist
- Jovica Elezović - Olympic medalist
- Mile Isaković - Olympic medalist
- Milan Kalina - Olympic medalist
- Dragan Mladenović - Olympic medalist
- Zdravko Rađenović - Olympic medalist
- Veselin Vuković - Olympic medalist
- Jožef Holpert - Olympic medalist
- Zlatko Portner - Olympic medalist
- Dragan Škrbić
- Nedeljko Jovanović
- Arpad Šterbik
- Ratko Nikolić
- Nenad Maksić
- Vladan Matić
- Mladen Bojinović
- Momir Ilić
- Darko Stanić
- Ivan Nikčević
- Rajko Prodanović
- Marko Vujin
- Petar Nenadić
- Nenad Vučković
- Alem Toskić
- Rastko Stojković

=== Female ===
- Svetlana Dašić-Kitić - Olympic and medalist, The best female handball player ever by the IHF, World Player of the Year 1988
- Svetlana Anastasovska - Olympic and medalist
- Mirjana Đurica - Olympic and medalist
- Slavica Đukić - Olympic medalist
- Dragica Đurić - Olympic medalist
- Emilija Erčić - Olympic medalist
- Ljubinka Janković - Olympic medalist
- Zorica Vojinović - Olympic medalist
- Radmila Savić - Olympic medalist
- Vesna Radović - Olympic medalist
- Vesna Milošević - Olympic medalist
- Radmila Drljača - Olympic medalist
- Slavica Jeremić - Olympic medalist
- Tatjana Medved
- Tanja Milanović
- Andrea Lekić
- Sanja Damnjanović
- Svetlana Ognjenović
- Katarina Tomašević
- Dragana Cvijić

== Ice hockey ==
- Alex Andjelic
- Ivan Boldirev

== Judo ==
- Radomir Kovačević - Olympic medalist
- Slavko Obadov - Olympic medalist
- Mara Kovačević
- Miloš Mijalković

== Karate ==
- Snežana Pantić

== Kickboxing ==
- Nenad Pagonis

== Rowing ==
- Milorad Stanulov - Olympic and medalist
- Zoran Pančić - Olympic and medalist
- Nikola Stojić
- Jovan Popović
- Iva Obradović
- Nenad Babović
- Goran Jagar
- Marko Marjanović
- Goran Nedeljković
- Miloš Tomić
- Đorđe Višacki

== Shooting sport ==
- Jasna Šekarić - - 1 x Olympic, 3 x and 1 x medalist
- Aleksandra Ivošev - Olympic and medalist
- Goran Maksimović - Olympic medalist
- Ivana Maksimović - Olympic medalist
- Andrija Zlatić - Olympic medalist
- Stevan Pletikosić - Olympic medalist
- Aranka Binder - Olympic medalist
- Zorana Arunović - World Champion
- Nemanja Mirosavljev - World championship bronze medalist
- Bobana Veličković - 2 times European Champion
- Andrea Arsović - European Champion, Mediterranean Champion
- Damir Mikec

== Swimming ==
- Milorad Čavić - Olympic medalist
- Nađa Higl
- Velimir Stjepanović
- Ivan Lenđer
- Čaba Silađi
- Nenad Miloš
- Predrag Miloš
- Miroslava Najdanovski
- Vladan Marković

== Table tennis ==
- Ilija Lupulesku - Olympic medalist
- Gordana Perkučin - Olympic medalist
- Jasna Fazlić - Olympic medalist
- Zoran Kalinić
- Aleksandar Karakašević
- Silvija Erdelji
- Slobodan Grujić

== Taekwondo ==
- Milica Mandić - Olympic medalist
- Vanja Babić

== Tennis ==
=== Players ===
- Novak Djokovic - World #1 player, 24 x Grand Slam winner, Olympic medalist, Olympic medalist
- Monica Seles - Former World #1 player, 9 x Grand Slam winner, Olympic medalist
- Ana Ivanovic - former World #1 player, Grand Slam winner
- Jelena Janković - former World #1 player, Wimbledon mixed doubles winner
- Nenad Zimonjić - former World #1 doubles player, 3 x Grand Slam winner in doubles, 4 x in mixed doubles
- Slobodan Živojinović - former World #1 doubles player, US open doubles winner
- Momčilo Tapavica - Olympic medalist, 1st ethnic Serb Olympic medalist
- Jelena Dokic
- Janko Tipsarević
- Viktor Troicki
- Bojana Jovanovski
- Miomir Kecmanović
- Olga Danilović

=== Coaches ===
- Jelena Genčić

== Triathlon ==
- Ognjen Stojanović
- Nenad Sudarov

== Volleyball ==
=== Players ===
==== Male ====
- Vladimir Grbić - Olympic and medalist
- Nikola Grbić - Olympic and medalist
- Goran Vujević - Olympic and medalist
- Andrija Gerić - Olympic and medalist
- Vladimir Batez - Olympic and medalist
- Slobodan Kovač - Olympic and medalist
- Đula Mešter - Olympic and medalist
- Ivan Miljković - Olympic medalist
- Slobodan Boškan - Olympic medalist
- Vasa Mijić - Olympic medalist
- Veljko Petković - Olympic medalist
- Rajko Jokanović - Olympic medalist
- Dejan Brđović - Olympic medalist
- Đorđe Đurić - Olympic medalist
- Žarko Petrović - Olympic medalist
- Željko Tanasković - Olympic medalist
- Goran Marić
- Vlado Petković
- Bojan Janić
- Nikola Kovačević
- Miloš Nikić
- Marko Podraščanin
- Dragan Stanković
- Saša Starović
- Nikola Rosić
- Mihajlo Mitić
- Aleksandar Atanasijević
- Uroš Kovačević

==== Female ====
- Jovana Brakočević
- Jelena Nikolić
- Maja Ognjenović
- Anja Spasojević
- Brižitka Molnar
- Nataša Krsmanović
- Suzana Ćebić
- Milena Rašić
- Sanja Malagurski
- Vesna Čitaković
- Stefana Veljković
- Ana Antonijević
- Ivana Đerisilo
- Tijana Malešević

=== Coaches ===
- Zoran Gajić
- Ljubomir Travica

== Water polo ==
=== Players ===
- Igor Milanović - 2x Olympic medalist
- Dragan Andrić - 2x Olympic medalist
- Mirko Sandić - Olympic and medalist
- Uroš Marović - Olympic medalist
- Aleksandar Šoštar - Olympic medalist
- Goran Rađenović - Olympic medalist
- Zoran Petrović - Olympic medalist
- Aleksandar Šapić - Olympic and 2 x medalist
- Vladimir Vujasinović - Olympic and 2 x medalist
- Dejan Savić - Olympic and 2 x medalist
- Aleksandar Ćirić- Olympic and 2 x medalist
- Vanja Udovičić - Olympic and 2 x medalist
- Danilo Ikodinović - Olympic and medalist
- Denis Šefik - Olympic and medalist
- Viktor Jelenić - Olympic and medalist
- Nikola Kuljača - Olympic and medalist
- Slobodan Nikić - Olympic and medalist
- Petar Trbojević - Olympic and medalist
- Filip Filipović - 2x Olympic medalist
- Andrija Prlainović - 2x Olympic medalist
- Slobodan Soro - 2x Olympic medalist
- Živko Gocić - 2x Olympic medalist
- Duško Pijetlović - 2x Olympic medalist
- Nikola Rađen - 2x Olympic medalist
- Milan Aleksić - Olympic medalist
- Stefan Mitrović - Olympic medalist
- Jugoslav Vasović - Olympic medalist
- Predrag Zimonjić - Olympic medalist
- Gojko Pijetlović - Olympic medalist
- Aleksa Šaponjić - Olympic medalist
- Dušan Mandić - Olympic medalist
- Branko Peković - Olympic medalist
- Marko Avramović
- Dušan Popović
- Miloš Ćuk
- Dragan Jovanović
- Branislav Mitrović

=== Coaches ===
- Dejan Udovičić
- Nenad Manojlović

== Wrestling ==
- Branislav Simić - Olympic and medalist
- Momir Petković - Olympic medalist
- Branislav Martinović - Olympic and medalist
- Ivan Frgić - Olympic medalist
- Refik Memišević - Olympic medalist
- Stevan Horvat - Olympic medalist
- Jožef Tertei - Olympic medalist
- Borivoje Vukov
- Kristijan Fris
- Davor Štefanek
- Aleksandar Maksimović
- Radomir Petković

== Paralympic athletes ==
- Tanja Dragić - Paralympic medalist in athletics
- Željko Dimitrijević - Paralympic medalist in athletics
- Draženko Mitrović - Double paralympic medalist in athletics
- Miloš Grlica - Paralympic medalist in athletics
- Zlatko Kesler - 1x, 2x and 2x paralympic medalist in table tennis
- Borislava Perić - Double paralympic medalist in table tennis

== Foreign athletes of Serbian origin ==
- Pete Maravich - basketball, Naismith Memorial Basketball Hall of Fame
- Dražen Petrović - basketball, Naismith Memorial Basketball Hall of Fame
- Natasa Dusev-Janics - canoeing, 3 x Olympic, 2 x, 1 x medalist
- Lavinia Miloșovici - gymnastics, 2 x Olympic, 1 x, 3 x medalist
- Nikola Karabatić - handball, 2 x Olympic medalist
- Daniel Nestor - tennis, Olympic medalist
- Paola Vukojicic - field hockey, Olympic 1 x, 2 x medalist
- Danijela Rundqvist - ice hockey, Olympic and medalist
- Adrien Plavsic - ice hockey, Olympic medalist
- Sara Isaković - swimming, Olympic medalist
- Bojana Radulović - handball, Olympic medalist
- Bojana Popović - handball, Olympic medalist
- Katarina Bulatović - handball, Olympic medalist
- Ana Đokić - handball, Olympic medalist
- Ljubomir Vranjes - handball, Olympic medalist
- Dalibor Doder - handball, Olympic medalist
- Dan Majerle - basketball, Olympic medalist
- Dragan Travica - volleyball, Olympic medalist
- James Trifunov - wrestling, Olympic medalist
- Alex Smith - American football
- Marija Šestak - athletics
- Christina Vukicevic - athletics
- Jeff Samardzija - baseball
- Brian Bogusevic - baseball
- Goran Dragić - basketball
- Sasha Vujačić - basketball
- Aleks Marić - basketball
- Gregg Popovich - basketball
- Press Maravich - basketball
- Tanja Kostic - basketball
- Milan Lucic - ice hockey
- Peter Zezel - ice hockey
- Branko Radivojevič - ice hockey
- Sasha Lakovic - ice hockey
- Dan Kesa - ice hockey
- Stan Smrke - ice hockey
- Mick Vukota - ice hockey
- Milan Marcetta - ice hockey
- Alex Petrovic - ice hockey
- Peter Popovic - ice hockey
- Milos Raonic - tennis
- Andrea Petkovic - tennis
- Kristina Mladenovic - tennis
- Igor Sijsling - tennis
- Frank Dancevic - tennis
- Rhonda Rajsich - racquetball
- Miloš Milošević - swimming
- Dejan Stankovic - beach soccer
- Miodrag Belodedici - football
- Steve Ogrizovic - football
- Zvjezdan Misimović - football
- Daniel Majstorović - football
- Bojan - football
- Marko Marin - football
- Marko Arnautović - football
- Milenko Ačimovič - football
- Milivoje Novaković - football
- Alex Smith - American football

== See also ==
- List of Serbs
- Sport in Serbia
