= List of flag bearers for Serbia and Montenegro at the Olympics =

Serbia and Montenegro at the Olympics
- IOC code: SCG
- NOC: Olympic Committee of Serbia and Montenegro
- Medals: Gold 2 Silver 4 Bronze 3 Total 9

Summer appearances
- 1996; 2000; 2004

Winter appearances
- 1998; 2002; 2006

Other related appearances
- Yugoslavia (1920–1992 W); Independent Olympic Participants (1992 S); Montenegro (2008–); Serbia (1912, 2008–); Kosovo (2016–)

This is a list of flag bearers who have represented Serbia and Montenegro (from 1996 to 2002 Federal Republic of Yugoslavia) at the Olympics.

== List of flag bearers ==
Flag bearers carry the national flag of their country at the opening ceremony of the Olympic Games.

Key

Born outside of Serbia and Montenegro

#	Event year	Season	Ceremony	Flag bearer	Sex	Municipality/District	Sport
1	1996	Summer	Opening	Igor Milanović	M	Belgrade	Water polo
2	1998	Winter	Opening	Marko Đorđević	M	Belgrade	Alpine skiing
3	2000	Summer	Opening	Vladimir Grbić	M	Zrenjanin, Central Banat	Volleyball
4	2002	Winter	Opening	Jelena Lolović	F	SR Bosnia and Herzegovina (now Bosnia and Herzegovina)	Alpine skiing
5	2004	Summer	Opening	Dejan Bodiroga	M	Zrenjanin, Central Banat	Basketball
6	2006	Winter	Opening	Jelena Lolović (2)	F	SR Bosnia and Herzegovina (now Bosnia and Herzegovina)	Alpine skiing

== See also ==
- Serbia and Montenegro at the Olympics
- List of flag bearers for Yugoslavia at the Olympics
- List of flag bearers for Serbia at the Olympics
- List of flag bearers for Montenegro at the Olympics
