= List of flag bearers for Serbia at the Olympics =

Serbia at the Olympics
- IOC code: SRB
- NOC: Olympic Committee of Serbia
- Website: www.oks.org.rs (in Serbian)
- Medals: Gold 9 Silver 8 Bronze 12 Total 29

Summer appearances
- 1912; 1920–2004; 2008; 2012; 2016; 2020; 2024; 2028

Winter appearances
- 2010; 2014; 2018; 2022; 2026

Other related appearances
- Yugoslavia (1920–1992 W); Independent Olympic Participants (1992 S); Serbia and Montenegro (1996–2006)

This is a list of flag bearers who have represented Serbia at the Olympics.

== List of flag bearers ==
Flag bearers carry the national flag of their country at the opening ceremony of the Olympic Games.

Key

Born outside of Serbia

#	Event year	Season	Ceremony	Flag bearer	Sex	Municipality/District	Sport
1	1912	Summer	Opening	Dragutin Tomašević	M	Petrovac, Braničevo	Athletics
2	2008	Summer	Opening	Jasna Šekarić	F	Belgrade	Shooting sports
3	2008	Summer	Closing	Saša Starović	M	Trebinje, SR Bosnia and Herzegovina (now Bosnia and Herzegovina)	Volleyball
4	2010	Winter	Opening	Jelena Lolović (3) *	F	Sarajevo, SR Bosnia and Herzegovina (now Bosnia and Herzegovina)	Alpine skiing
5	2010	Winter	Closing	Vuk Rađenović	M	SR Bosnia and Herzegovina (now Bosnia and Herzegovina)	Bobsleigh
6	2012	Summer	Opening	Novak Djokovic	M	Belgrade	Tennis
7	2012	Summer	Closing	Milica Mandić	F	Belgrade	Taekwondo
8	2014	Winter	Opening	Milanko Petrović	M	Sjenica, Zlatibor	Biathlon and cross-country skiing
9	2014	Winter	Closing	Nevena Ignjatović	F	Kragujevac, Šumadija	Alpine skiing
10	2016	Summer	Opening	Ivana Maksimović	F	Belgrade	Shooting sports
11	2016	Summer	Closing	Tijana Bogdanović	F	Kruševac, Rasina	Taekwondo
12	2018	Winter	Opening	Nevena Ignjatović	F	Kragujevac, Šumadija	Alpine skiing
13	2018	Winter	Closing	Nevena Ignjatović	F	Kragujevac, Šumadija	Alpine skiing
14	2020	Summer	Opening	Filip Filipović	M	Belgrade	Water polo
15	2020	Summer	Opening	Sonja Vasić	F	Belgrade	Basketball
16	2020	Summer	Closing	Jovana Preković	F	Aranđelovac, Šumadija	Karate
17	2022	Winter	Opening	Marko Vukićević	M	Ljubljana, Slovenia	Alpine skiing
18	2022	Winter	Closing	Volunteer			
19	2024	Summer	Opening	Dušan Mandić	M	Kotor, Montenegro	Water polo
20	2024	Summer	Opening	Maja Ognjenović	F	Zrenjanin, Central Banat	Volleyball
21	2024	Summer	Closing	Zorana Arunović	F	Belgrade	Shooting sports
22	2024	Summer	Closing	Damir Mikec	M	Split, Socialist Republic of Croatia (now Croatia)	Shooting sports
23	2026	Summer	Opening	Miloš Milosavljević	M		Cross-country skiing
24	2026	Summer	Opening	Anja Ilić	F	Užice, Zlatibor District	Cross-country skiing

*Previously two times the flag bearer for Serbia and Montenegro

== See also ==
- Serbia at the Olympics
- List of flag bearers for Yugoslavia at the Olympics
- List of flag bearers for Serbia and Montenegro at the Olympics
