= Yugoslavia at the 1996 Summer Olympics =

FR Yugoslavia at the 1996 Summer Olympics
- Flag of FR Yugoslavia
- IOC code: YUG
- NOC: Yugoslav Olympic Committee

in Atlanta
- Competitors: 68 (59 men, 9 women) in 13 sports
- Flag bearer: Igor Milanović
- Medals Ranked 41st: Gold 1 Silver 1 Bronze 2 Total 4

Summer Olympics appearances (overview)
- 1996; 2000; 2004

Other related appearances
- Yugoslavia (1920–1992 W); Serbia (1912, 2008–pres.); Croatia (1992–pres.); Slovenia (1992–pres.); Bosnia and Herzegovina (1992 S–pres.); Independent Olympic Participants (1992 S); North Macedonia (1996–pres.); Montenegro (2008–pres.); Kosovo (2016–pres.)

Athletes from the Federal Republic of Yugoslavia competed at the 1996 Summer Olympics in Atlanta, United States. These Games were the first Olympic appearance of Montenegrin and Serbian athletes under the Flag of the Federal Republic of Yugoslavia and the continuation of the use of Yugoslavia as a designation. The nation was not allowed to participate at the 1992 Summer Olympics because of international sanctions. Several Yugoslav athletes competed as Independent Olympic Participants at those Games. New Yugoslavia participated in thirteen sports: athletics, basketball, canoe/kayak, diving, fencing, judo, shooting, swimming, table tennis, volleyball, water polo, weightlifting, and wrestling.

== Medalists ==
=== Gold ===
- Aleksandra Ivošev – Shooting — Women's 50 metre rifle three positions

=== Silver ===
- Dejan Tomašević, Miroslav Berić, Dejan Bodiroga, Željko Rebrača, Predrag Danilović, Vlade Divac, Aleksandar Đorđević, Saša Obradović, Žarko Paspalj, Zoran Savić, Nikola Lončar, Milenko Topić — Basketball, Men's Team Competition

=== Bronze ===
- Aleksandra Ivošev — Shooting, Women's 10 metre air rifle
- Vladimir Batez, Dejan Brđović, Đorđe Đurić, Andrija Gerić, Nikola Grbić, Vladimir Grbić, Rajko Jokanović, Slobodan Kovač, Đula Mešter, Željko Tanasković, Žarko Petrović, Goran Vujević — Volleyball, Men's Team Competition

== Athletics ==
Men's Marathon

- Borislav Dević — 2:21.22 (→ 49th place)

Men's 50 km Walk

- Aleksandar Raković — 3:51:31 (→ 11th place)

Men's High Jump

- Dragutin Topić

- Qualification — 2.28m
- Final — 2.32m (→ 4th place)

- Stevan Zorić

- Qualification — 2.15m (→ did not advance)

Men's Long Jump

- Andreja Marinković

- Qualification — 7.17m (→ did not advance)

Men's Shot Put

- Dragan Perić

- Qualification — 19.61m
- Final — 20.07m (→ 8th place)

Women's 200 metres

- Marina Živković

- Heat — 23.51 (→ did not advance)

Women's 400 metres

- Marina Živković

- Heat — 53.10 (→ did not advance)

Women's Marathon

- Suzanna Ćirić — 2:49.30 (→ 55th place)

== Basketball ==
=== Men's tournament ===
Team Roster

- Dejan Tomašević
- Miroslav Berić
- Dejan Bodiroga
- Željko Rebrača
- Predrag Danilović
- Vlade Divac
- Aleksandar Đorđević
- Saša Obradović
- Žarko Paspalj
- Zoran Savić
- Nikola Lončar
- Milenko Topić

Preliminary round

Pos	Team	Pld	W	L	PF	PA	PD	Pts	Qualification
1	FR Yugoslavia	5	5	0	478	364	+114	10	Quarterfinals
2	Australia	5	4	1	492	438	+54	9	Quarterfinals
3	Greece	5	3	2	402	416	−14	8	Quarterfinals
4	Brazil	5	2	3	498	494	+4	7	Quarterfinals
5	Puerto Rico	5	1	4	447	465	−18	6	9th place playoff
6	South Korea	5	0	5	422	562	−140	5	11th place playoff

Source: FIBA archive
Rules for classification: 1) points; 2) head-to-head points; 3) head-to-head goal average; 4) head-to-head number of points scored.

20 July 1996

Report

Greece	63–71	FR Yugoslavia
Scoring by half: 30–30, 33–41
Pts: Fasoulas 21; Rebs: Fasoulas 10; Asts: Sigalas 4		Pts: Savić 21; Rebs: Divac 8 Asts: Đorđević 6

Atlanta
Referees: Donald Cline (CAN), Carl Jungebrand (FIN)

22 July 1996

Report

FR Yugoslavia	91–68	Australia
Scoring by half: 54–28, 37–40
Pts: Obradović 18; Rebs: Rebrača, Savić 5 Asts: Danilović 6		Pts: Bradtke 18; Rebs: Gaze 7 Asts: Gaze 8

Atlanta
Referees: Wieslaw Zych (POL), Jose Reyes Ronfini (MEX)

24 July 1996

Report

FR Yugoslavia	118–65	South Korea
Scoring by half: 57–28, 61–37
Pts: Danilović 19; Rebs: Divac 8 Asts: Đorđević 10		Pts: J. Y. Hyun 20; Rebs: D. H. Kang 4 Asts: Hur Jae 5

Atlanta
Referees: Joseph Derosa (USA), Virun Thongpila (THA)

26 July 1996

Report

Brazil	82–101	FR Yugoslavia
Scoring by half: 31–55, 51–46
Pts: de Mello 19; Rebs: Janjao 6 Asts: Ratto, Klafke 4		Pts: Danilović 21; Rebs: Divac, Tomašević 6 Asts: Obradović 6

Atlanta
Referees: Gennaro Colucci ITA, Raul Chaves Sagel (ARG)

28 July 1996

Report

FR Yugoslavia	97–86	Puerto Rico
Scoring by half: 45–34, 52–52
Pts: Danilović 22; Rebs: Divac 10; Asts: Đorđević 7		Pts: Ortiz 20; Rebs: Ortiz 11; Asts: Rivera 9

Atlanta
Referees: Donald Cline (CAN), Serguei Boulanov (RUS)

Quarterfinals

30 July 1996
12:00

Report

FR Yugoslavia	128–61	China
Scoring by half: 63–29, 65–32
Pts: Rebrača 22; Rebs: Topić 8 Asts: Berić, Đorđević 6		Pts: Wang 13; Rebs: Wang, Wu 4 Asts: Li 3

Atlanta
Referees: Hidetoshi Ishida (JPN), Gennaro Colucci ITA

Semifinals

1 August 1996
20:00

Report

FR Yugoslavia	66–58	Lithuania
Scoring by half: 35–31, 31–27
Pts: Danilović 19; Rebs: Divac 8 Asts: Bodiroga 4		Pts: Kurtinaitis 22; Rebs: Sabonis 13; Asts: Marčiulionis 6

Atlanta
Referees: Wieslaw Zych (POL), Jose Lapaix Guance (DOM)

Gold medal match

3 August 1996
22:00

Report

FR Yugoslavia	69–95	United States
Scoring by half: 38–43, 31–52
Pts: Paspalj 19; Rebs: Bodiroga, Đorđević 5 Asts: Đorđević 6		Pts: Robinson 28; Rebs: Robinson 7 Asts: Stockton 7

Atlanta
Referees: Miguel Betancor León (ESP), José Reyes Ronfini (MEX)

== Canoeing ==
- Petar Sibinkić

- Qualifying Heat — 1:45.799
- Repechage: 1:46.532 (→ did not advance)

== Diving ==
Men's 3m Springboard

- Siniša Žugic

- Preliminary Heat — 181.17 (→ did not advance, 38th place)

- Vukan Vuletić

- Preliminary Heat — 181.17 (→ did not advance, 37th place)

== Fencing ==
Women's épée

- Tamara Savić-Šotra

- Round 1: Lost to Yuliya Garayeva of Russia (7:15) (→ did not advance)

== Judo ==
Men's Half-Middleweight

- Dragoljub Radulović

Men's Heavyweight

- Mitar Milinković

== Shooting ==
Men's 10m Air Rifle

- Goran Maksimović

- Qualification: 589 points (15th overall, did not advance)

- Nemanja Mirosavljev

- Qualification: 589 points (15th overall, did not advance)

Men's 50m Rifle Prone

- Stevan Pletikosić

- Qualification: 595 points (11th overall, did not advance)

- Goran Maksimović

- Qualification: 594 points (20th overall, did not advance)

Men's 50m Rifle 3 Positions

- Goran Maksimović

- Qualification: 1173 points (Prone: 394 points, Standing: 387 points, Kneeling: 392 points) (3rd overall, Qualified)
- Final: 95.8 points (Total: 1268.8) → 4th place

- Stevan Pletikosić

- Qualification: 1156 points (Prone: 398 points, Standing: 369 points, Kneeling: 389 points) (35th overall, did not advance)

Women's 10m Air Rifle

- Aleksandra Ivošev

- Qualification: 395 points (5th overall, Qualified)
- Final: 102.2 points (Total: 497.2) → Bronze Medal

- Aranka Binder

- Qualification: 393 points (Shootoff: 4th: 100; 3rd: 98) (9th overall, did not advance)

Women's 50m Rifle 3 Positions

- Aleksandra Ivošev

- Qualification: 587 points (Prone: 199 points, Standing: 193 points, Kneeling: 195 points) (2nd overall, Qualified)
- Final: 99.1 points (Total: 686.1) → Gold Medal

- Aranka Binder

- Qualification: 574 points (Prone: 197 points, Standing: 189 points, Kneeling: 188 points) (22nd overall, did not advance)

Women's 10m Air Pistol

- Jasna Šekarić

- Qualification: 384 points (5th overall, Qualified)
- Final: 103.1 points (Total: 487.1) → 4th

- Marija Mladenović

- Qualification: 379 points (34th overall, did not advance)

Women's 25m Pistol

- Jasna Šekarić

- Qualification: 580 points (8th overall, Qualified)
- Final: 100.4 points (Total: 680.4) → 6th

== Swimming ==
Men's 100 Freestyle

- Nikola Kalabić

- Heat — 52.98 (→ did not advance, 53rd place)

Men's 100 Butterfly

- Vladan Marković

- Heat — 54.90 (→ did not advance, 28th place)

Men's 200 Butterfly

- Vladan Marković

- Heat — 2:01.80 (→ did not advance, 28th place)

Women's 50 Freestyle

- Duška Radan

- Heat — 27.62 (→ did not advance, 45th place)

Women's 100 Freestyle

- Duška Radan

- Heat — 1:00.34 (→ did not advance, 46th place)

Women's 200 Backstroke

- Maja Grozdanić

- Heat — 2:20.65 (→ did not advance, 27th place)

== Table tennis ==
Men's Singles Competition

- Ilija Lupulesku
- Preliminary Round (Group D)

- Lost to Lee Chul-Seung of South Korea (1–2)
- Defeated Isaac Opoku of Ghana (0–2)
- Lost to Jan-Ove Waldner of Sweden (0–2)
- 3rd in pool D (→ did not advance)

- Slobodan Grujić
- Preliminary Round (Group F)

- Defeated Philippe Saive of Belgium (2–1)
- Defeated Mark Smythe of Australia (2–1)
- Lost to Liu Guoliang of China (1–2)
- 2nd in pool F (→ did not advance)

- Aleksandar Karakašević
- Preliminary Round (Group N)

- Lost to Li Gun-Sang of North Korea (1–2)
- Lost to Yoo Nam-Kyu of South Korea (0–2)
- Defeated Michael Hyatt of Jamaica (2–0)
- 3rd in pool N (→ did not advance)

Men's Doubles Competition

- Ilija Lupulesku and Slobodan Grujić
- Preliminary Round (Group H)

- Defeated Sule Olaleye and Segun Toriola of Nigeria (2–0)
- Defeated Petr Korbel and Josef Plachy of Czech Republic (2–0)
- Lost to Koji Matsushita and Hiroshi Shibutani of Japan (0–2)
- 2nd in pool H (→ did not advance)

== Volleyball ==
=== Men's Indoor Team Competition ===
- Preliminary Round (Group B)

- Defeated Russia (3–1)
- Defeated South Korea (3–0)
- Defeated Tunisia (3–1)
- Lost to the Netherlands (0–3)
- Lost to Italy (0–3)

- Quarterfinals

- Defeated Brazil (3–2)

- Semifinals

- Lost to Italy (1–3)

- Bronze Medal Match

- Defeated Russia (3–1) → Bronze Medal

- Team Roster

- Vladimir Batez
- Dejan Brđović (captain)
- Đorđe Đurić
- Andrija Gerić
- Nikola Grbić
- Vladimir Grbić
- Rajko Jokanović
- Slobodan Kovač
- Đula Mešter
- Željko Tanasković
- Žarko Petrović
- Goran Vujević

== Water polo ==
=== Preliminary round ===
==== Group A ====
	Team	Points	G	W	D	L	GF	GA	Diff
1.	Hungary	10	5	5	0	0	47	38	+9
2.	FR Yugoslavia	7	5	3	1	1	46	44	+2
3.	Spain	6	5	3	0	2	39	33	+6
4.	Russia	5	5	2	1	2	42	38	+4
5.	Germany	2	5	1	0	4	36	45	−9
6.	Netherlands	0	5	0	0	5	36	48	−12

- Saturday July 20, 1996

FR Yugoslavia	11–8	Netherlands

- Sunday July 21, 1996

Russia	9–9	FR Yugoslavia

- Monday July 22, 1996

FR Yugoslavia	9–7	Spain

- Tuesday July 23, 1996

FR Yugoslavia	9–8	Germany

- Wednesday July 24, 1996

Hungary	12–8	FR Yugoslavia

==== Quarterfinals ====
- Friday July 26, 1996

FR Yugoslavia	6–8	Croatia

==== Semifinals ====
- Saturday July 27, 1996 — 5th/8th place

FR Yugoslavia	15–16	Russia

==== Finals ====
- Sunday July 28, 1996 — 7th place

United States	12–8	FR Yugoslavia

- Team Roster

- Igor Milanović
- Mirko Vičević
- Aleksandar Šoštar
- Viktor Jelenić
- Aleksandar Šapić
- Dejan Savić
- Petar Trbojević
- Veljko Uskoković
- Vladimir Vujasinović
- Predrag Zimonjić
- Ranko Perović
- Vaso Subotić
- Milan Tadić

== Weightlifting ==
Men

Athlete	Event	Snatch		Clean & Jerk		Total	Rank
Athlete	Event	Result	Rank	Result	Rank	Total	Rank
Miodrag Kovačić	-64 kg	110.0 kg	33	137.5 kg	34	247.5 kg	34

== Wrestling ==
=== Greco-Roman ===
Men's Middleweight

- Aleksandar Jovančević

- Round 1: Lost to Raatbek Sanatbayev of Kyrgyzstan (0–3)
- Classification Round 2: Defeated Elias Marcano of Venezuela (11–1)
- Classification Round 3: Defeated Anton Arghira of Romania (5–0)
- Classification Round 4: Lost to Levon Geghamyan of Armenia (0–2) → 9th place

Men's Light-Heavyweight

- Goran Kasum

- Round 1: Defeated Doug Cox of Canada (3–0)
- Round 2: Lost to Hakkı Başar of Turkey (0–3)
- Classification Round 3: Lost to Reynaldo Peña of Cuba (0–3) → 18th place
