= Radmila =

Radmila is a popular given female name in Serbia. It is derived from the Slavic words rada (the feminine of rade meaning "happiness") and mila ("sweet").

== Famous bearers ==
- Radmila Bakočević (born 1933), Serbian operatic soprano with a major international opera career from 1955 to 1982
- Radmilla Cody (born 1975), Navajo/Diné singer and indigenous rights activist
- Radmila Drljača (born 1959), Yugoslav handball player
- Radmila Hrustanović (born 1952), Serbian politician
- Radmila Karaklajić (born 1939), Serbian singer and actress
- Radmila "Rada" Manojlović (born 1985), Serbian pop folk singer
- Radmila Miljanić-Petrović (born 1988), Montenegrin handball player
- Radmila Perišić (born 1980), Serbian judoka
- Radmila Šekerinska (born 1972), Macedonian politician and Defense Minister
- Radmila Savić (born 1961), Yugoslav handball player
- Radmila Šekerinska (born 1972), leader of the Social Democratic Union of Macedonia
- Radmila Smiljanić (born 1940), Serbian opera singer
- Radmila Vasileva (born 1964), Bulgarian basketball player

== See also ==
- Slavic names
