= Montenegro at the 2022 Winter Olympics =

- Flag of Montenegro
- IOC code: MNE
- NOC: Montenegrin Olympic Committee
- Website: www.cok.me

in Beijing, China 4–20 February 2022
- Competitors: 3 (2 men and 1 woman) in 2 sports
- Flag bearers (opening): Eldar Salihović; Jelena Vujicic
- Flag bearer (closing): Volunteer
- Medals: Gold 0 Silver 0 Bronze 0 Total 0

Winter Olympics appearances (overview)
- 2010; 2014; 2018; 2022; 2026

Other related appearances
- Yugoslavia (1924–1992); Serbia and Montenegro (1998–2006)

Montenegro competed at the 2022 Winter Olympics in Beijing, China, from 4 to 20 February 2022.

The Montenegro team consisted of three athletes (two men and one woman) competing in two sports, equaling the team size from PyeongChang 2018. Eldar Salihović and Jelena Vujicic were the country's flagbearer during the opening ceremony. Meanwhile a volunteer was the flagbearer during the closing ceremony.

== Competitors ==
The following is the list of number of competitors participating at the Games per sport/discipline.

Sport	Men	Women	Total
Alpine skiing	1	1	2
Cross-country skiing	1	0	1
Total	2	1	3

== Alpine skiing ==
By meeting the basic qualification standards, Montenegro qualified one male and one female alpine skier.

Athlete	Event	Run 1		Run 2		Total	
Athlete	Event	Time	Rank	Time	Rank	Time	Rank
Eldar Salihović	Men's giant slalom	1:18.84	47	1:22.70	42	2:41.54	41
Eldar Salihović	Men's slalom	1:09.61	50	1:02.21	39	2:11.82	42
Jelena Vujičić	Women's giant slalom	DNF		did not advance			
Jelena Vujičić	Women's slalom	DNF		did not advance			

== Cross-country skiing ==
By meeting the basic qualification standards, Montenegro qualified one male cross-country skier.

Distance

Athlete	Event	Time	Deficit	Rank
Aleksandar Grbovic	Men's 15 km classical	52:44.9	+14:50.1	93

Sprint

Athlete	Event	Qualification		Quarterfinal		Semifinal		Final	
Athlete	Event	Time	Rank	Time	Rank	Time	Rank	Time	Rank
Aleksandar Grbovic	Men's sprint	3:24.12	84	did not advance					
