= Montenegro at the 2018 Winter Olympics =

- Flag of Montenegro
- IOC code: MNE
- NOC: Montenegrin Olympic Committee
- Website: www.cok.me

in Pyeongchang, South Korea 9–25 February 2018
- Competitors: 3 (1 man and 2 women) in 2 sports
- Flag bearer: Jelena Vujičić
- Medals: Gold 0 Silver 0 Bronze 0 Total 0

Winter Olympics appearances (overview)
- 2010; 2014; 2018; 2022; 2026; 2030

Other related appearances
- Yugoslavia (1924–1992); Serbia and Montenegro (1998–2006)

Montenegro competed at the 2018 Winter Olympics in Pyeongchang, South Korea, from 9 to 25 February 2018, with three competitors in two sports.

== Competitors ==
The following is the list of number of competitors participating in the delegation per sport.

Sport	Men	Women	Total
Alpine skiing	1	1	2
Cross-country skiing	0	1	1
Total	1	2	3

== Alpine skiing ==
Montenegro qualified two athletes, one male and one female.

Athlete	Event	Run 1		Run 2		Total	
Athlete	Event	Time	Rank	Time	Rank	Time	Rank
Eldar Salihović	Men's giant slalom	1:20.51	71	1:20.72	64	2:41.23	64
Eldar Salihović	Men's slalom	DNF					
Jelena Vujičić	Women's giant slalom	1:30.53	66	1:28.12	58	2:58.65	58
Jelena Vujičić	Women's slalom	DNF					

== Cross-country skiing ==
Montenegro qualified one female athlete. The country will be making its debut in the sport at the Winter Olympics.

Distance

Athlete	Event	Final		
Athlete	Event	Time	Deficit	Rank
Marija Bulatović	Women's 10 km freestyle	35:24.0	+10:23.5	88

== See also ==
- Montenegro at the 2018 Summer Youth Olympics
