= Montenegro at the 2010 Winter Olympics =

- IOC code: MNE
- NOC: Montenegrin Olympic Committee
- Website: www.cok.me

in Vancouver
- Competitors: 1 in 1 sport
- Flag bearer: Bojan Kosić
- Medals: Gold 0 Silver 0 Bronze 0 Total 0

Winter Olympics appearances (overview)
- 2010; 2014; 2018; 2022; 2026

Other related appearances
- Yugoslavia (1924–1992); Serbia and Montenegro (1998–2006)

Montenegro participated at the 2010 Winter Olympics in Vancouver, Canada, held between 12 and 28 February 2010. The country's participation in the Games marked its debut at the Winter Olympics. The Montenegro team consisted of a lone athlete Bojan Kosić who competed across two events in alpine skiing. Kosić also served as the country's flag-bearer during the opening ceremony. Montenegro did not win any medal in the Games.

== Background ==
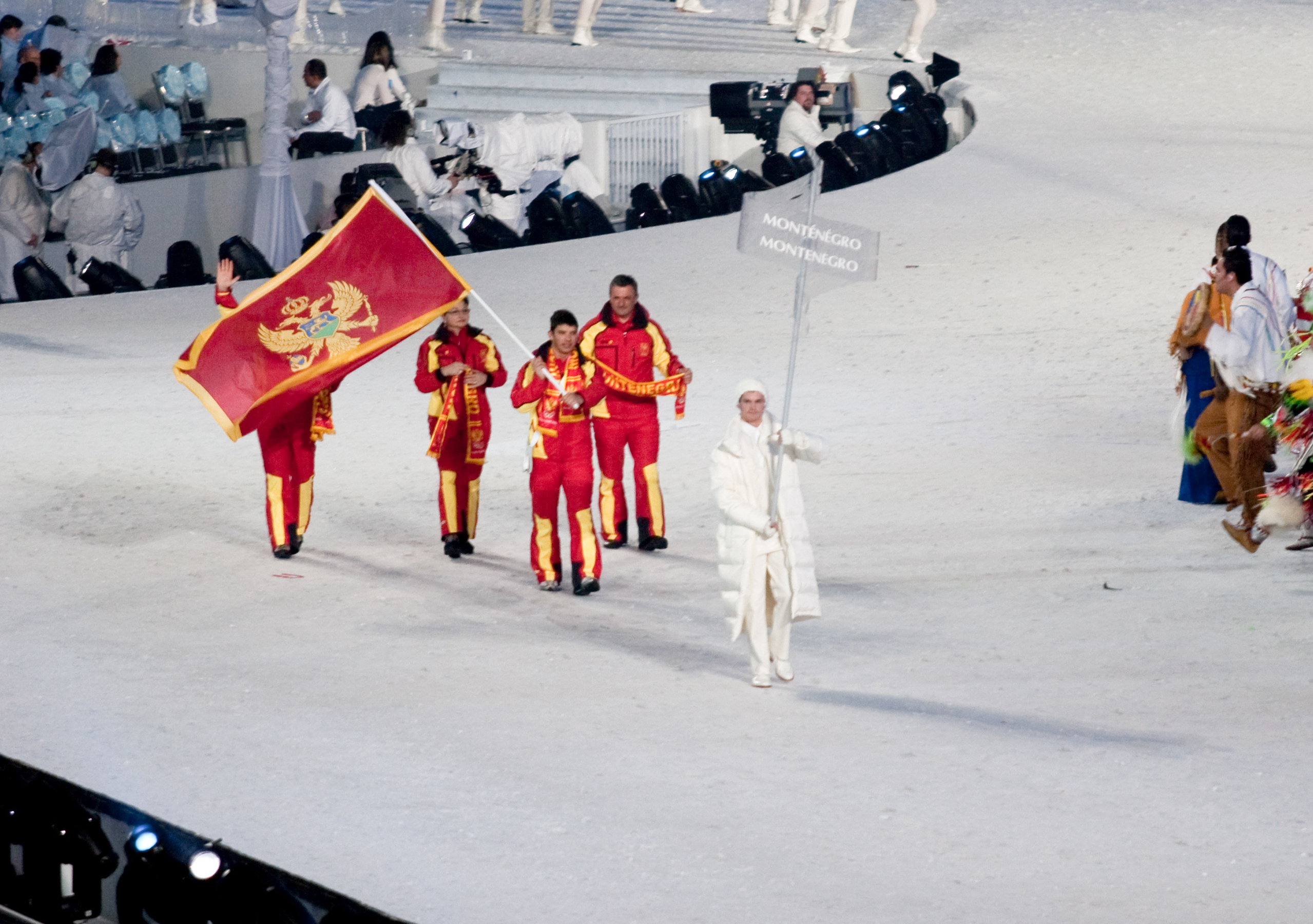
Bojan Kosić with the delegates during the opening ceremony

Athletes from Montenegro competed for Yugoslavia earlier and, later for Serbia and Montenegro. After the country seceded from Serbia in late 2006, the Montenegrin Olympic Committee was approved by the International Olympic Committee (IOC) on 6 July 2007. After the nation made its Olympics debut in the 2008 Summer Olympics, the 2010 Winter Olympics marked Montenegro's first participation in the Winter Olympic Games.

The 2010 Winter Olympics was held in Vancouver, Canada, between 12 and 28 February 2010. The Montenegron delegation consisted of a lone athlete Bojan Kosić. Kosić also served as the country's flag-bearer in the Parade of Nations during the opening ceremony. Montenegro did not win any medal in the Games.

== Competitors ==
Montenegro sent a single athlete who competed in two events in a single sport at the Games.

Sport	Men	Women	Athletes
Alpine skiing	1	0	1
Total	1	0	1

== Alpine skiing ==
Bojan Kosić represented the country in alpine skiing. Kosic was one of the best known skiers from Montenegro, and the first Winter Olympics participant from the nation. He was the sole competitor for Montenegro at the 2010 Winter Olympics. This was his only participation in the Winter Games.

The alpine skiing events took place at Whistler Creekside. In the Men's slalom event, Kosić finished 40th with a time of 1:55.32. In the giant slalom, he clocked a time of 2:58.03 across the 1,509 m (4,951 ft) course to finish 61st amongst the 81 finishers.

After the Games, Kosić survived a near fatal car crash resulting in serious head injuries in 2011. Though he successfully returned to skiing in 2014, he was unable to take part in the 2014 Winter Olympics.

Athlete	Event	Run 1	Run 2	Final	
Athlete	Event	Time	Time	Time	Rank
Bojan Kosić	Men's giant slalom	1:27.74	1:30.29	2:58.03	61
Bojan Kosić	Men's slalom	56.15	59.17	1:55.32	40
