= Marko Đorđević =

Marko Đorđević (alternatively spelled Djordjevic) may refer to:

- Marko Đorđević (footballer) (born 1983), Serbian footballer
- Marko Đorđević (film director) (born 1988), Serbian filmmaker
- Marko Đorđević (skier) (born 1978), Serbian alpine skier
