= Serbia at the 2010 Winter Olympics =

- IOC code: SRB
- NOC: Olympic Committee of Serbia
- Website: www.oks.org.rs (in Serbian)

in Vancouver
- Competitors: 10 in 4 sports
- Flag bearers: Jelena Lolović (opening); Vuk Rađenović (closing)
- Medals: Gold 0 Silver 0 Bronze 0 Total 0

Winter Olympics appearances (overview)
- 2010; 2014; 2018; 2022; 2026

Other related appearances
- Yugoslavia (1924–1992); Serbia and Montenegro (1998–2006)

Serbia participated at the 2010 Winter Olympics in Vancouver, British Columbia, Canada. It was the first time the nation had participated in the Winter Olympics after competing as Serbia and Montenegro in the previous Olympics.

== Alpine skiing ==
| Athlete | Event | Run 1 | Run 2 | Total | Rank |
|---|---|---|---|---|---|
| Nevena Ignjatović | Women's slalom | 55.27 | 55.21 | 1:50.48 | 32 |
| Nevena Ignjatović | Women's giant slalom | 1:20.04 | 1:17.47 | 2:37.51 | 39 |
| Nevena Ignjatović | Women's super-G | | | DNF | |
| Jelena Lolović | Women's giant slalom | 1:20.03 | 1:14.51 | 2:34.54 | 33 |
| Jelena Lolović | Women's slalom | 1:05.67 | DNS | | |
| Jelena Lolović | Women's super-G | | | 1:26.67 | 30 |
| Marija Trmčić | Women's slalom | DNF | | | |

== Biathlon ==
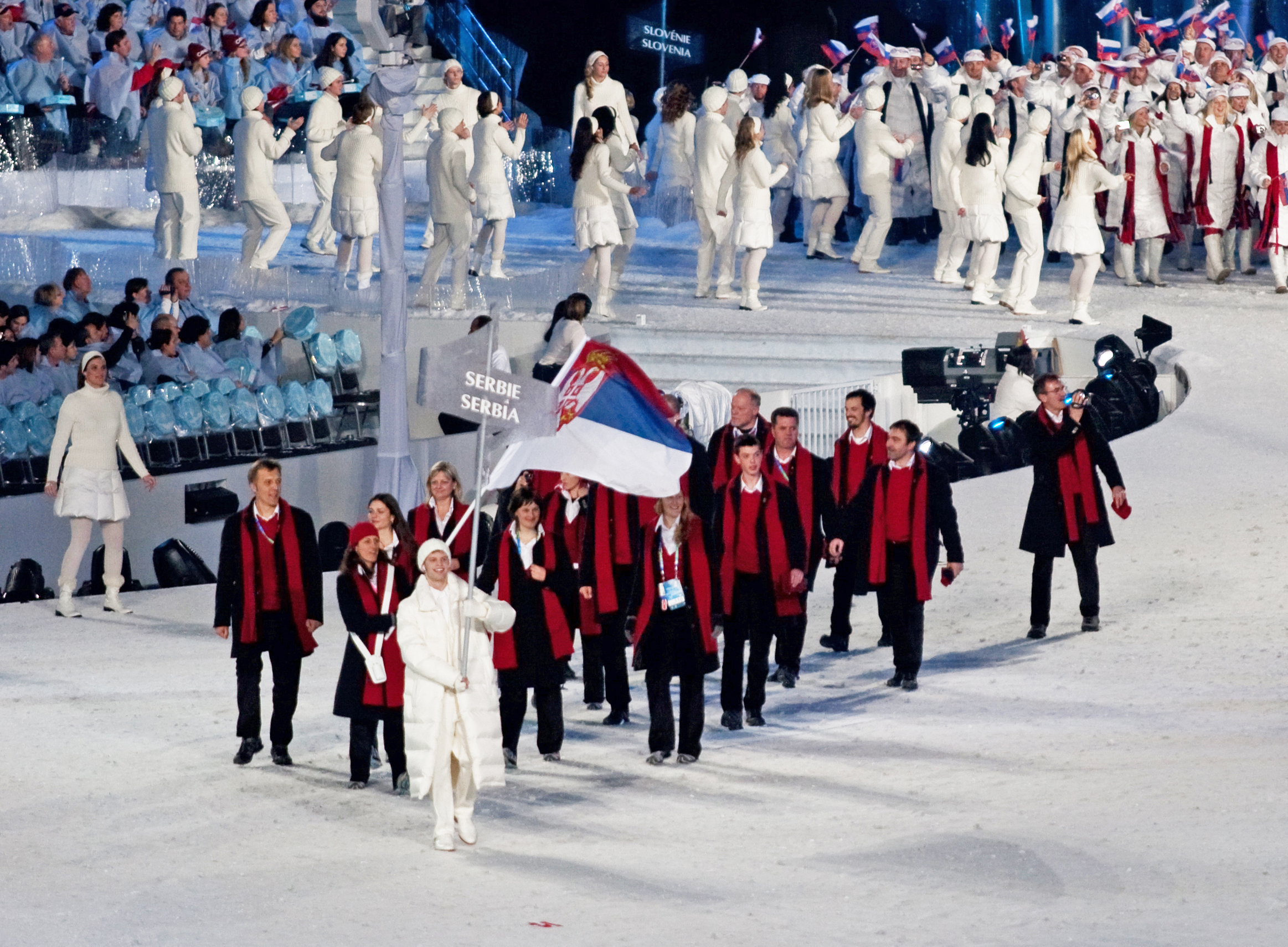
The athletes entering the stadium during the opening ceremonies.

| Athlete | Event | Final | | |
| Athlete | Event | Time | Misses | Rank |
|---|---|---|---|---|
| Milanko Petrović | Men's individual | 59:44.0 | 2+1+2+2 | 87 |
| Milanko Petrović | Men's sprint | 28:38.9 | 1+3 | 81 |

== Bobsleigh ==
Serbia was allowed to enter in the four man event following reallocation from the FIBT on 26 January 2010.

| Athlete | Event | Run 1 | | Run 2 | | Run 3 | | Run 4 | | Total | |
| Athlete | Event | Time | Rank | Time | Rank | Time | Rank | Time | Rank | Time | Rank |
|---|---|---|---|---|---|---|---|---|---|---|---|
| Vuk Rađenović; Miloš Savić; Igor Šarčević; Slobodan Matijević | Four-man | 52.37 | 20 | 52.40 | 17 | 52.84 | 19 | 52.74 | 18 | 3:30.35 | 18 |

== Cross-country skiing ==
| Athlete | Event | Final | |
| Athlete | Event | Time | Rank |
|---|---|---|---|
| Belma Šmrković | Women's 10 km freestyle | 35:47.4 | 78 |
| Amar Garibović | Men's 15 km freestyle | 40:12.0 | 80 |

== See also ==
- Serbia at the 2010 Winter Paralympics
- Serbia at the 2010 Summer Youth Olympics
