= Tarik Hadžić =

Montenegrin alpine skier (born 1994)

Personal information
- Born: March 17, 1994 (age 32) Rožaje, FR Yugoslavia
Medal record
Alpine skiing
Representing Montenegro

Tarik Hadžić (born March 17, 1994 in Rožaje, Montenegro) is an alpine skier from Montenegro. He competed for Montenegro at the 2014 Winter Olympics in the slalom and giant slalom. Hadžić was also selected to carry the Montenegrin flag during the opening ceremony.

== See also ==
- Montenegro at the 2014 Winter Olympics

Olympic Games
Preceded by Bojan Kosić	Flagbearer for Montenegro; Sochi 2014	Succeeded by Incumbent
