= Federal Republic of Yugoslavia at the 1998 Winter Olympics =

FR Yugoslavia at the 1998 Winter Olympics
- Flag of FR Yugoslavia
- IOC code: YUG
- NOC: Yugoslav Olympic Committee

in Nagano
- Competitors: 2 (1 man, 1 woman) in 1 sport
- Flag bearer: Marko Đorđević
- Medals: Gold 0 Silver 0 Bronze 0 Total 0

Winter Olympics appearances (overview)
- 1998; 2002; 2006

Other related appearances
- Croatia (1992–); Slovenia (1992–); Bosnia and Herzegovina (1994–); North Macedonia (1998–); Serbia and Montenegro (1998–2006); Montenegro (2010–); Serbia (2010–); Kosovo (2018–)

Athletes from the Federal Republic of Yugoslavia competed at the 1998 Winter Olympics in Nagano, Japan. This was the first Olympic appearance of Montenegrin and Serbian athletes under the Flag of the Federal Republic of Yugoslavia. The nation was banned from the 1994 Winter Olympics due to United Nations war sanctions.

== Competitors ==
The following is the list of number of competitors in the Games.

| Sport | Men | Women | Total |
|---|---|---|---|
| Alpine skiing | 1 | 1 | 2 |
| Total | 1 | 1 | 2 |

== Alpine skiing ==
| Athlete | Event | Race 1 | Race 2 | Total | |
| Athlete | Event | Time | Time | Time | Rank |
Men
| Marko Đorđević | Giant Slalom | 1:30.34 | 1:28.13 | 2:58.47 | 35 |
Women
| Mirjana Granzov | Slalom | 52.45 | 54.20 | 1:46.65 | 27 |
