= Montenegro at the 2014 Winter Olympics =

- IOC code: MNE
- NOC: Montenegrin Olympic Committee
- Website: www.cok.me

in Sochi
- Competitors: 2 in 1 sport
- Flag bearer: Tarik Hadžić
- Medals: Gold 0 Silver 0 Bronze 0 Total 0

Winter Olympics appearances (overview)
- 2010; 2014; 2018; 2022; 2026

Other related appearances
- Yugoslavia (1924–1992); Serbia and Montenegro (1998–2006)

Montenegro competed at the 2014 Winter Olympics in Sochi, Russia from 7 to 23 February 2014. The team consisted of two athletes competing in alpine skiing and for the first time a female athlete.

== Competitors ==
Sport	Men	Women	Total
Alpine skiing	1	1	2
Total	1	1	2

== Alpine skiing ==
According to the quota allocation released on January 20, 2014, Montenegro has two athletes in qualification position.

Athlete	Event	Run 1		Run 2		Total	
Athlete	Event	Time	Rank	Time	Rank	Time	Rank
Tarik Hadžić	Men's giant slalom	1:36.55	71	1:35.84	60	3:12.39	62
Tarik Hadžić	Men's slalom	1:00.95	71	1:06.99	36	2:07.94	38
Ivana Bulatović	Women's slalom	1:07.49	53	1:05.31	44	2:12.80	44
