= Serbia and Montenegro at the 2006 Winter Olympics =

- IOC code: SCG
- NOC: Olympic Committee of Serbia and Montenegro

in Turin
- Competitors: 6 (3 men, 3 women) in 4 sports
- Flag bearers: Jelena Lolović (opening); Aleksandar Milenković (closing)
- Medals: Gold 0 Silver 0 Bronze 0 Total 0

Winter Olympics appearances (overview)
- 1998; 2002; 2006

Other related appearances
- Yugoslavia (1924–1992); Montenegro (2010–pres.); Serbia (2010–pres.); Kosovo (2018–pres.)

Serbia and Montenegro competed at the 2006 Winter Olympics in Turin, Italy. This was the last appearance of a team representing a joint Montenegrin and Serbian state at the Olympic venue.

== Alpine skiing ==
Jelena Lolović represented Serbia and Montenegro in four of the five disciplines, and had the best finish for the alpine skiing team, 30th in the women's giant slalom.

Athlete	Event	Final				
Athlete	Event	Run 1	Run 2	Run 3	Total	Rank
Jelena Lolović	Women's super-G	n/a			1:37.45	43
Jelena Lolović	Women's giant slalom	1:05.00	1:13.84	n/a	2:18.84	30
Jelena Lolović	Women's slalom	46.44	56.36	n/a	1:42.80	43
Jelena Lolović	Women's combined	did not finish				
Marija Trmčić	Women's slalom	49.47	53.99	n/a	1:43.46	46
Želimir Vuković	Men's slalom	1:00.51	disqualified			

Note: In the men's combined, run 1 is the downhill, and runs 2 and 3 are the slalom. In the women's combined, run 1 and 2 are the slalom, and run 3 the downhill.

== Biathlon ==
Milenković finished ahead of just three other competitors in each of his two races in Turin. Biathlon was the third Olympic sport Milenković had participated in, as he had previously competed in cycling and cross-country skiing.

Athlete	Event	Final		
Athlete	Event	Time	Misses	Rank
Aleksandar Milenković	Men's sprint	33:17.7	6	86
Aleksandar Milenković	Men's individual	1:10:36.3	9	85

== Cross-country skiing ==
Neither cross-country skier managed to finish a race; Milenković withdrew in the final two kilometres of the 50 km race, while Kuzeljević withdrew in the first 2.5 kilometres of the women's pursuit.

Distance

Athlete	Event	Final	
Athlete	Event	Total	Rank
Branka Kuzeljević	Women's 15 km pursuit	Did not finish	
Aleksandar Milenković	Men's 50 km freestyle	Did not finish	

== Figure skating ==
The top finish from any member of the Serbia and Montenegro team in Turin came from Trifun Živanović, who did not advance to the free skate, but ended up 26th overall in the men's event.

Athlete	Event	SP		FS		Total	
Athlete	Event	Points	Rank	Points	Rank	Points	Rank
Trifun Živanović	Men's	53.40	26	did not advance			

Key: SP = Short Program, FS = Free Skate
