= Serbia at the 2014 Winter Paralympics =

- IPC code: SRB
- NPC: Paralympic Committee of Serbia
- Website: www.paralympic.rs

in Sochi
- Competitors: 1 in 1 sport
- Flag bearer: Jugoslav Milošević
- Medals: Gold 0 Silver 0 Bronze 0 Total 0

Winter Paralympics appearances (overview)
- 2010; 2014; 2018; 2022; 2026

Other related appearances
- Yugoslavia (1972–1988)

Serbia sent a delegation to compete at the 2014 Winter Paralympics, in Sochi, Russia from 7–16 March 2014. This was the nation's second appearance at a Winter Paralympic Games. The Serbian delegation consisted of a single athlete alpine skier Jugoslav Milošević, whose best finish was 29th in the standing men's giant slalom event.

== Background ==
According to the International Paralympic Committee's system of classifying countries, Serbia first competed in the Summer Paralympics in the 2008 Summer Paralympics, and the Winter Paralympics at the 2010 Winter Paralympics. Before this, they competed as part of Serbia and Montenegro. Therefore, Sochi was the nation's second appearance at a Winter Paralympics. The 2014 Winter Paralympics were held from 7–16 March 2014, in Sochi, Russia; 45 countries and 547 athletes took part in the multi-sport event. The Serbian delegation to Sochi consisted of a single athlete alpine skier, Jugoslav Milošević. He was chosen as the Serbian flag bearer for the parade of nations during the opening ceremony and for the closing ceremony.

== Disability classification ==
Every participant at the Paralympics has their disability grouped into one of five disability categories; amputation, the condition may be congenital or sustained through injury or illness; cerebral palsy; wheelchair athletes, there is often overlap between this and other categories; visual impairment, including blindness; or Les Autres, any physical disability that does not fall strictly under one of the other categories, for example dwarfism or multiple sclerosis. Each Paralympic sport then has its own classifications, dependent upon the specific physical demands of competition. Events are given a code, made of numbers and letters, describing the type of event and classification of the athletes competing. Events with "B" in the code are for athletes with visual impairment, codes LW1 to LW9 are for athletes who stand to compete and LW10 to LW12 are for athletes who compete sitting down. Alpine skiing events grouped athletes into separate competitions for sitting, standing and visually impaired athletes.

== Alpine skiing ==
Jugoslav Milošević was 45 years old at the time of the Sochi Paralympics. His disability is congenital, he was born without a left forearm, and he is classified as LW6/8-1. As an LW6/8-1, he competes in a standing position, the International Paralympic Committee says about this classification that: "Skiers have an impairment in one arm. Skiers will compete with one ski pole only". On 13 March he competed in the standing slalom, finishing with run times of 1 minute and 10 seconds and 1 minute and 18 seconds. His combined time of 2 minutes and 28 seconds put him in 33rd position out of 35 athletes who completed both runs. On 15 March he participated in the giant slalom, finishing his first run in a time of 1 minute and 40 seconds. He competed his second run in the afternoon in a time of 1 minute and 41 seconds, making his overall time 3 minutes and 22 seconds. This placed him 29th and last out of the competitors who completed both runs.

| Athlete | Event | Run 1 | | | Run 2 | | | Final/Total | | |
| Athlete | Event | Time | Diff | Rank | Time | Diff | Rank | Time | Diff | Rank |
|---|---|---|---|---|---|---|---|---|---|---|
| Jugoslav Milošević | Slalom, standing | 1:10.34 | +22.65 | 39 | 1:18.45 | +27.17 | 34 | 2:28.79 | +49.82 | 33 |
| Jugoslav Milošević | Giant slalom, standing | 1:40.94 | +26.22 | 34 | 1:41.42 | +30.27 | 29 | 3:22.36 | +56.49 | 29 |

== See also ==
- Serbia at the 2014 Winter Olympics
- Serbia at the Paralympics
