= Serbia at the 2026 Winter Paralympics =

- Flag of Serbia
- IPC code: SRB
- NPC: Paralympic Committee of Serbia

in Milan & Cortina d'Ampezzo, Italy 6 March 2026 – 15 March 2026
- Competitors: 1 (1 man) in 1 sport
- Medals: Gold 0 Silver 0 Bronze 0 Total 0

Winter Paralympics appearances (overview)
- 2010; 2014; 2018; 2022; 2026

Other related appearances
- Yugoslavia (1972–1988)

Serbia will compete at the 2026 Winter Paralympics in Milan & Cortina d'Ampezzo, Italy, which will take place between 6–15 March 2026.

== Competitors ==
The following is the list of number of competitors participating at the Games per sport/discipline.

Sport	Men	Women	Total
Para alpine skiing	1	0	1
Total	1	0	1

== Para alpine skiing ==
Athlete	Class	Event	Run 1		Run 2		Total	
Athlete	Class	Event	Time	Rank	Time	Rank	Time	Rank
Luka Bilčar	LW4	Men's giant slalom, standing	1:36.65	32	1:34.53	30	3:11.18	31
Luka Bilčar	LW4	Men's slalom, standing	1:10.81	26	1:07.33	23	2:18.14	23

== See also ==
- Serbia at the Paralympics
- Serbia at the 2026 Winter Olympics
