= Serbia at the 2010 Winter Paralympics =

- IPC code: SRB
- NPC: Paralympic Committee of Serbia
- Website: www.paralympic.rs

in Vancouver
- Competitors: 1 in 1 sport
- Flag bearer: Jasmin Bambur
- Medals: Gold 0 Silver 0 Bronze 0 Total 0

Winter Paralympics appearances (overview)
- 2010; 2014; 2018; 2022; 2026

Other related appearances
- Yugoslavia (1972–1988)

Serbia will send a delegation to compete at the 2010 Winter Paralympics, in Vancouver. It will be fielding a single athlete, in alpine skiing.

Serbia will thus be making its Winter Paralympics début, marking the first time it competes separately from Montenegro.

== Alpine skiing ==
The following athlete will be Serbia's sole representative in alpine skiing:

Athlete	Event	Run 1			Run 2			Total		
Athlete	Event	Time	Diff	Rank	Time	Diff	Rank	Time	Diff	Rank
Jasmin Bambur	Men's downhill sitting									9
Jasmin Bambur	Men's slalom sitting									25
Jasmin Bambur	Men's giant slalom sitting									33
Jasmin Bambur	Men's super-G sitting									20
Jasmin Bambur	Men's super combined sitting									

== See also ==
- Serbia at the 2010 Winter Olympics
- Serbia at the Paralympics
