= Serbia at the 2026 Winter Olympics =

- Flag of Serbia
- IOC code: SRB
- NOC: Olympic Committee of Serbia
- Website: www.oks.org.rs (in Serbian)

in Milan and Cortina d'Ampezzo, Italy 6 February 2026 – 22 February 2026
- Competitors: 3 (2 men and 1 woman) in 2 sports
- Flag bearers (opening): Miloš Milosavljević & Anja Ilić
- Flag bearer (closing): Volunteer
- Medals: Gold 0 Silver 0 Bronze 0 Total 0

Winter Olympics appearances (overview)
- 2010; 2014; 2018; 2022; 2026

Other related appearances
- Yugoslavia (1924–1992); Serbia and Montenegro (1998–2006)

Serbia competed at the 2026 Winter Olympics in Milan and Cortina d'Ampezzo, Italy, from 6 to 22 February 2026.

Cross-country skiers Miloš Milosavljević and Anja Ilić were the country's flagbearer during the opening ceremony. Meanwhile, a volunteer was the country's flagbearer during the closing ceremony.

== Competitors ==
The following is the list of number of competitors participating at the Games per sport/discipline.

Sport	Men	Women	Total
Alpine skiing	1	0	1
Cross-country skiing	1	1	2
Total	2	1	3

== Alpine skiing ==
Serbia qualified one male athlete.

Athlete	Event	Run 1		Run 2		Total	
Athlete	Event	Time	Rank	Time	Rank	Time	Rank
Aleksa Tomović	Men's giant slalom	1:24.97	49	1:18.64	48	2:43.61	47
Aleksa Tomović	Men's slalom	DNF					

== Cross-country skiing ==
Serbia qualified one male and one female cross-country skier through the basic quota.

Distance

Athlete	Event	Classical		Freestyle		Final		
Athlete	Event	Time	Rank	Time	Rank	Time	Deficit	Rank
Miloš Milosavljević	Men's 10 km freestyle	—N/a				25:46.5	+5:10.3	88
Anja Ilić	Women's 10 km freestyle	—N/a				32:22.9	+9:33.7	106

Sprint

Athlete	Event	Qualification		Quarterfinal		Semifinal		Final	
Athlete	Event	Time	Rank	Time	Rank	Time	Rank	Time	Rank
Miloš Milosavljević	Men's sprint	3:47.03	87	Did not advance					
Anja Ilić	Women's sprint	4:44.69	86	Did not advance					

== See also ==
- Serbia at the 2026 Winter Paralympics
