= Olympic Committee of Serbia and Montenegro =

- Country: Serbia and Montenegro
- Code: SCG
- Continental Association: EOC
- Dissolved: 2006
- Headquarters: Belgrade

The Olympic Committee of Serbia and Montenegro (Serbian: Олимпијски комитет Србије и Црне Горе / Olimpijski komitet Srbije i Crne Gore) was the non-profit organization representing athletes from Serbia and Montenegro in the International Olympic Committee. It was founded in 1992 when the olympic committee of newly formed Federal Republic of Yugoslavia (constituted by Serbia and Montenegro in 1992) kept the name, the Yugoslav Olympic Committee, that of the committee of the previous country, Socialist Federative Republic of Yugoslavia. In 2003 country of FR Yugoslavia changed the name to Serbia and Montenegro which was followed by the name change of its olympic committee, renaming it to Olympic Committee of Serbia and Montenegro.

During the dissolution of the State Union of Serbia and Montenegro after Montenegrin independence referendum in 2006, Montenegrin Olympic Committee was formed and the Olympic Committee of Serbia was restored as the legal successor of the NOC SCG.

== Successors ==
- Montenegrin Olympic Committee (2006)
- Olympic Committee of Serbia (1910–1918, 2006)

== See also ==
- Serbia and Montenegro at the Olympics
