= Nenad Sudarov =

Serbian triathlete

Nenad Sudarov (born January 1, 1975, in Kikinda) is an ITU- listed Olympic and Half Ironman distance triathlete from Serbia. Notable achievements include 25-30 age group champion of Europe 2005 and three straight wins at Mljet Half Ironman

== Championships ==
- Winner of the race series YUTU Cup and in 1999, 2000, 2001
- Winner Open Championship Bulgaria 2001 Sofia
- Winner of the Balkan Championship 2000 Sofia (Bulgaria)
- Winner FashonTriathlon PRO 2001-BARCS (Hungary)
- Winner Toš Triathlon 2001 Kiskunhalas (Hungary)
- Winner FIAT Triathlon 2001 Kiskunhalas (Hungary)
- Winner Half-Iron Man 2001-Mljet (Croatia)
- Absolute champion in the Balkan Championships Istanbul-Turkey 2002
- 2002 Leader of Yugoslavia in the Novi Sad
- Winner YU TU CUP 2002
- First place at the Iron Man Mljet-Croatia 2002
- 2003 SCG Triathlon Championship - 1st place
- 2003 Winner SCG Cup
- 2003 Half Ironman (Mljet) Croatia 1st place
- 2003 Half Ironman (Tiszafurdo) Hungary 1st place
- 2004 SCG Cup 1st place
- 2004 Winner SCG Cup
- 2004 Citroen Triathlon (Hodmezovasarhely) Hungary 1st place
