= Vaso Subotić =

Serbian water polo player

Personal information
- Nationality: Serbian
- Born: 29 April 1969 (age 57)

Sport
- Sport: Water polo
Medal record
Representing Yugoslavia
World Championships
Gold medal – first place	1991 Perth	Team competition
European Championships
Gold medal – first place	1991 Athens	Team competition
Silver medal – second place	1997 Seville	Team competition

Vaso Subotić (born 29 April 1969) is a Serbian water polo player. He competed in the men's tournament at the 1996 Summer Olympics.

== See also ==
- List of world champions in men's water polo
- List of World Aquatics Championships medalists in water polo
