= Radmila Savić =

Serbian handball player (born 1961)

Olympic medal record

Women's Handball
Silver medal – second place	1980 Moscow	Team

Radmila "Rada" Savić (Serbian Cyrillic: Радмила "Рада" Савић, born 18 June 1961 in Belgrade) is a former Yugoslav handball player who competed in the 1980 Summer Olympics.

In 1980 she won the silver medal with the Yugoslav team. She played two matches.
