= Bojan Kosić =

Montenegrin alpine skier (born 1990)

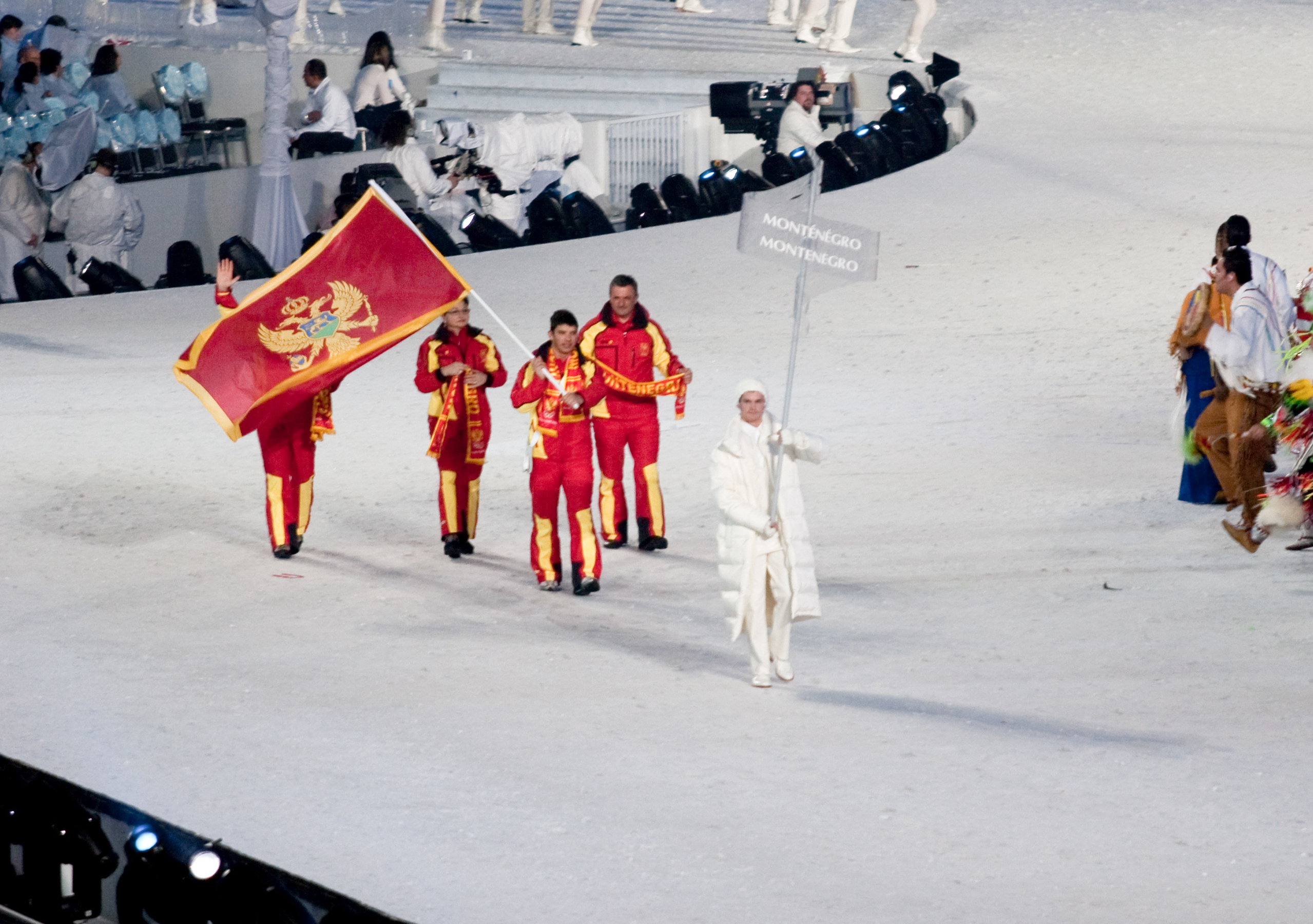
Montenegro entering with his team into the 2010 Olympics Opening Ceremony

Bojan Kosić (born in Nikšić December 14, 1990) is a Montenegrin alpine skier. He was the sole competitor for Montenegro at the 2010 Winter Olympics.
