= Jugoslav Vasović =

Serbian water polo player

Personal information
- Born: 31 May 1974 (age 52) Belgrade, Yugoslavia

Sport
- Sport: Water polo
Medal record
Representing Yugoslavia
Olympic Games
Bronze medal – third place	2000 Sydney	Team competition

Jugoslav Vasović (born 31 May 1974 in Belgrade, SR Serbia, SFR Yugoslavia) is a Serbian retired water polo player who played for FR Yugoslavia at the 2000 Summer Olympics.

He retired from the sport in 2012 after playing the last season with Red Star Belgrade. His older brother Anto Vasović also played water polo professionally.

== Club career ==
After starting out in the VK Partizan youth system, Vasović moved to Jadran Split where he got his first taste of full squad water polo at the Mediterranean Cup in İzmir.

=== Clubs ===
- 1990–91 - (Socialist Federal Republic of Yugoslavia) Jadran Split
- 1991–94 - (Socialist Federal Republic of Yugoslavia) (Federal Republic of Yugoslavia) Red Star Belgrade
- 1994–95 - (Federal Republic of Yugoslavia) VK Budva
- 1995–01 - (Federal Republic of Yugoslavia) VK Bečej
- 2001–02 - (Greece) AC Palaio Faliro
- 2002–03 - (Italy) RN Florentia
- 2003–04 - (Russia) Shturm Chekhov
- 2004–05 - (Serbia and Montenegro) VK Partizan
- 2005–08 - (Italy) RN Florentia
- 2008–09 - (Serbia) VK Partizan
- 2009–11 - (Saudi Arabia) Al-Qadisiya
- 2011–12 - (Serbia) Red Star Belgrade

== Personal ==
Vasović's son Anto, named after Jugoslav's older brother, is a professional footballer.

He also has 3 children: 2 sons (Anto and Marko) and a daughter Teodora.

== See also ==
- List of Olympic medalists in water polo (men)
