= Radmila Drljača =

Bosnian handball player

Olympic medal record

Women's Handball
Silver medal – second place	1980 Moscow	Team

Radmila Drljača-Savić (Serbian Cyrillic: Радмила Дрљача, born December 21, 1959, in Bosanski Novi) is a former Yugoslav handball player who competed in the 1980 Summer Olympics. In 1980, she won the silver medal with the Yugoslav team. She played three matches including the final.
