= Montenegro at the Olympics =

- IOC code: MNE
- NOC: Montenegrin Olympic Committee
- Website: www.cok.me(in Montenegrin)
- Medals Ranked 137th: Gold 0 Silver 1 Bronze 0 Total 1

Summer appearances
- 2008; 2012; 2016; 2020; 2024; 2028

Winter appearances
- 2010; 2014; 2018; 2022; 2026

Other related appearances
- Yugoslavia (1920–1992W); Independent Olympic Participants (1992S); Serbia and Montenegro (1996–2006)

Montenegro participated at the Olympic Games for the first time as an independent nation in 2008, at the Beijing Games. Previously, Montenegrin athletes have competed as part of Serbia and Montenegro in 2004 and as part of Yugoslavia before that.

The National Olympic Committee for Montenegro is the Montenegrin Olympic Committee. It was created in 2006 and recognized by the International Olympic Committee in 2007.

== Timeline of participation ==
Olympic Year/s	Team
1920–1936	Kingdom of Yugoslavia
1948–1992 W	Yugoslavia
1992 S	Independent Olympic Participants
1994	
1996–2006	FR Yugoslavia/ Serbia and Montenegro
2008–present	Montenegro

== Medal tables ==
=== Medals by Summer Games ===
Games	Athletes	Gold	Silver	Bronze	Total	Rank
1920–1988	as part of Yugoslavia					
1992 Barcelona	as part of the Independent Olympic Participants					
1996–2004	as part of Serbia and Montenegro					
2008 Beijing	19	0	0	0	0	–
2012 London	34	0	1	0	1	69
2016 Rio de Janeiro	34	0	0	0	0	–
2020 Tokyo	34	0	0	0	0	–
2024 Paris	19	0	0	0	0	–
2028 Los Angeles	future event					
2032 Brisbane	future event					
Total		0	1	0	1	137

=== Medals by Winter Games ===
Games	Athletes	Gold	Silver	Bronze	Total	Rank
1924–1992	as part of Yugoslavia					
1994 Lillehammer	did not participate					
1998–2006	as part of Serbia and Montenegro					
2010 Vancouver	1	0	0	0	0	–
2014 Sochi	2	0	0	0	0	–
2018 Pyeongchang	3	0	0	0	0	–
2022 Beijing	3	0	0	0	0	–
2026 Milano Cortina	2	0	0	0	0	–
2030 French Alps	future event					
2034 Utah	future event					
Total		0	0	0	0	–

=== Medals by summer sport ===
Sport	Gold	Silver	Bronze	Total
Handball	0	1	0	1
Totals (1 entries)	0	1	0	1

== Olympic participants ==
=== Summer Olympics ===
Sport	2008	2012	2016	2020	Athletes
Athletics	2	2	2	2	8
Boxing	1	1			2
Handball		14	15	14	43
Judo	1	1	1	1	4
Sailing		1	1	1	3
Shooting	1	1		1	3
Swimming	1		2	2	5
Tennis			1		1
Water Polo	13	13	13	12	51

== List of medalists ==
On August 11, 2012, Montenegro won its first ever Olympic medal as an independent country, taking silver in women's handball.

Medal	Name	Games	Sport	Event
Silver	Montenegro women's national handball team: Sonja Barjaktarović; Anđela Bulatović; Katarina Bulatović; Ana Đokić; Marija Jovanović; Milena Knežević; Suzana Lazović; Majda Mehmedović; Radmila Miljanić; Bojana Popović; Jovanka Radičević; Ana Radović; Maja Savić; Jasna Tošković; Marina Vukčević	2012 London	Handball	Women's tournament

Before the 2012 Olympic Games, several other athletes from the Socialist Republic of Montenegro and Republic of Montenegro have also won Olympic medals in five different sports as part of teams representing Yugoslavia and Serbia and Montenegro at the Olympics, but none as individual competitors.

Medal	Games	Sport	Team	Name
Silver	1952 Helsinki	Water polo	Men	Boško Vuksanović
Silver	1956 Melbourne	Football	Men	Nikola Radović
Silver	1956 Melbourne	Water polo	Men	Boško Vuksanović
Silver	1964 Tokyo	Water polo	Men	Boris Čukvas, Božidar Stanišić
Gold	1968 Mexico City	Water polo	Men	Dejan Dabović, Đorđe Perišić
Silver	1976 Montreal	Basketball	Men	Žarko Varajić, Rajko Žižić
Gold	1980 Moscow	Basketball	Men	Rajko Žižić
Silver	1980 Moscow	Water polo	Men	Milivoj Bebić, Zoran Gopčević, Milorad Krivokapić, Zoran Mustur
Gold	1984 Los Angeles	Handball	Women	Svetlana Mugoša, Ljiljana Mugoša, Zorica Pavićević
Gold	1984 Los Angeles	Handball	Men	Veselin Vujović
Gold	1984 Los Angeles	Water polo	Men	Milorad Krivokapić, Andrija Popović
Bronze	1984 Los Angeles	Basketball	Men	Rajko Žižić
Bronze	1984 Los Angeles	Football	Men	Ljubomir Radanović
Gold	1988 Seoul	Water polo	Men	Igor Gočanin, Mirko Vičević
Bronze	1988 Seoul	Handball	Men	Veselin Vujović
Bronze	1996 Atlanta	Volleyball	Men	Goran Vujević, Vladimir Batez
Gold	2000 Sydney	Volleyball	Men	Goran Vujević, Igor Vušurović, Vladimir Batez
Bronze	2000 Sydney	Water polo	Men	Veljko Uskoković, Nenad Vukanić
Silver	2004 Athens	Water polo	Men	Vladimir Gojković, Predrag Jokić

== See also ==
- List of flag bearers for Montenegro at the Olympics
- Montenegro at the Paralympics
