= Jelena Vujičić =

Montenegrin alpine skier (born 2001)

Personal information
- Born: 24 January 2001 (age 24); Pljevlja, FR Yugoslavia

Sport
- Country: Montenegro
- Sport: Alpine skiing

Jelena Vujičić (Montenegrin pronunciation: [jělena ʋûjitʃitɕ]; born 24 January 2001) is a Montenegrin alpine skier. She competed in slalom and giant slalom at the 2018 Winter Olympics.
