= Veljko Uskoković =

Montenegrin water polo player

Medal record

Men's Water polo

Representing Yugoslavia

European Championship
| Gold medal – first place | 1991 Athens | |

Representing Serbia and Montenegro

Olympic Games
| Bronze medal – third place | 2000 Sydney | |

World Championship
| Silver medal – second place | 2001 Fukuoka | |
| Bronze medal – third place | 1998 Perth | |
| Bronze medal – third place | 2003 Barcelona | |

European Championship
| Gold medal – first place | 2001 Budapest | |
| Silver medal – second place | 1997 Seville | |

Mediterranean Games
| Gold medal – first place | 1997 Bari | |

Universiade
| Gold medal – first place | 1995 Fukuoka | |

Representing Montenegro

European Championship
| Gold medal – first place | 2008 Málaga | |

Veljko Uskoković (Montenegrin: Вељко Ускоковић; born 29 March 1971 in Cetinje, Montenegro) is a retired Montenegrin water polo player. His club achievements are: European Champion 2000 (Becej team), 4 times Yugoslav Champion (Budvanska rivijera and Becej) 4 times Yugoslav Cup Winner (Budvanska rivijera and Becej). Member of Yugoslav national water polo team from 1991 to 2002. Team captain from 1996 to 2001. Uskoković played more than 300 games, and scored over 400 goals.

With national teams, Uskoković won: gold at the European Championship in Athens 1991, Budapest 2001 and Malaga 2008, silver at the European Championship in Seville 1997, bronze at the Olympic games in Sydney 2000, played at Olympic games Atlanta 1996 and Beijing 2008, bronze at the World Championship in Perth 1998, silver at the World Championship in Fukuoka 2001, gold medal at the Universiade in Fukuoka 1995, gold medal at the Mediterranean games in Bari 1997. Played for the World's Best Water Polo Team 2000 and 2001. This success, in combination with geo-political changes, makes him the only water polo player in the world who won gold medals with four different national water polo teams: representing SFR Yugoslavia, FR Yugoslavia, Serbia and Montenegro and finally Montenegro.

He was given the honour to carry the national flag of Montenegro at the opening and closing ceremonies of the 2008 Summer Olympics in Beijing, becoming the 22nd water polo player to be a flag bearer at the opening and closing ceremonies of the Olympics.

From 2008 he is waterpolo coach in ''Primorac'' and ''Cattaro'' club in Kotor, Montenegro. He is waterpolo coach in junior national team, too. Best result as a coach silver medal in Junior World Championship 2016.

He was named best Montenegrin athlete in 1991 in Montenegro and best athlete in 2016.

== Clubs honours ==
- 1999-00 LEN Euroleague - Champion, with VK Bečej Naftagas

== See also ==
- Montenegro men's Olympic water polo team records and statistics
- List of Olympic medalists in water polo (men)
- List of flag bearers for Montenegro at the Olympics
- List of World Aquatics Championships medalists in water polo

Olympic Games
| Preceded by None | Flagbearer for Montenegro; Beijing 2008 | Succeeded by Srđan Mrvaljević |
