= Jelena Lolović =

Serbian alpine skier (born 1981)

Personal information
- Born: 14 July 1981 (age 45) Sarajevo, SR Bosnia and Herzegovina, SFR Yugoslavia
- Height: 1.67 m (5 ft 6 in)

Skiing career
- Sport: Alpine skiing
- Club: Čukarički
- Retired: 2010
- Disciplines: Downhill, super-G, giant slalom, slalom, combined
- World Cup debut: 21 January 2001

Olympics
- Teams: 3 – (2002–10)
- Medals: 0 (0 gold)

World Championships
- Teams: 6 – (1999–09)
- Medals: 0 (0 gold)

World Cup
- Seasons: 4
- Wins: 0
- Podiums: 0
- Overall titles: 0
- Discipline titles: 0
Medal record
Women's alpine skiing
Representing Serbia and Montenegro
Winter Universiade
Gold medal – first place	2005 Innsbruck	Downhill
Silver medal – second place	2005 Innsbruck	Giant slalom
Silver medal – second place	2005 Innsbruck	Super-G
Bronze medal – third place	2003 Tarvisio	Giant slalom

Jelena Lolović (Serbian Cyrillic: Јелена Лоловић; born in Sarajevo, SR Bosnia and Herzegovina, SFR Yugoslavia on 14 July 1981) is a Serbian alpine skier.

She participated at the 2002, 2006 and 2010 Winter Olympics and was the flag bearer for her country each time.

== Olympic results ==
Event	Slalom	Giant slalom	Super-G	Downhill
2002 Salt Lake City	DNF (2)	40.	–	–
2006 Turin	43.	30.	43.	DNF
2010 Vancouver	DNF (2)	33.	30.	–

== World Cup standings ==
Season	Overall	Slalom	Giant slalom	Combined
2005	105	–	–	22
2007	100	49	40	–
2008	96	54	39	36
2010	108	46	–	–

== See also ==
- List of flag bearers for Serbia and Montenegro at the Olympics
- List of flag bearers for Serbia at the Olympics
- 2010 Winter Olympics national flag bearers

Olympic Games
Preceded by Marko Đorđević	Flagbearer for Yugoslavia/Serbia and Montenegro/Serbia; Salt Lake City 2002; Turin 2006; Vancouver 2010	Succeeded by Milanko Petrović
