= Serbia and Montenegro at the Olympics =

- IOC code: SCG
- NOC: Olympic Committee of Serbia and Montenegro
- Medals Ranked 91st: Gold 2 Silver 4 Bronze 3 Total 9

Summer appearances
- 1996; 2000; 2004

Winter appearances
- 1998; 2002; 2006

Other related appearances
- Yugoslavia (1920–1992 W); Independent Olympic Participants (1992 S); Montenegro (2008–pres.); Serbia (1912, 2008–pres.); Kosovo (2016–pres.)

The former State Union of Serbia and Montenegro (Federal Republic of Yugoslavia) was represented at the Olympic Games on six occasions between 1996 and 2006, when the union was dissolved and Montenegro and Serbia each declared full independence.

== History ==
Yugoslavia had been represented at every Summer Olympic Games from 1920–1988, and all but two Winter Olympic Games between 1924–1988. Because of the breakup of Yugoslavia in 1991 and 1992, Olympic participation changed. Newly independent Croatia and Slovenia sent their own delegations to the 1992 Winter Olympics, with Yugoslavia represented by athletes from Bosnia and Herzegovina, Macedonia, Montenegro and Serbia. These would be the last Games for the Socialist Federal Republic of Yugoslavia.

The Federal Republic of Yugoslavia was established in April 1992, consisting of the Republic of Montenegro and the Republic of Serbia. However, United Nations Security Council Resolution 757 (adopted May 30, 1992) called upon states to:

Take the necessary steps to prevent the participation in sporting events on their territory of persons or groups representing the Federal Republic of Yugoslavia (Serbia and Montenegro);

— Paragraph 8(b)

Despite this, the International Olympic Committee decided unanimously that athletes from Serbia and Montenegro (and also Macedonia) could compete in the 1992 Summer Olympics in Barcelona. The conditions imposed were that the athletes would compete as Independent Olympic Participants (IOP), wear white clothing without distinctive signs, and use the Olympic Anthem and Olympic flag in victory ceremonies. The athletes could not participate at the opening and closing ceremonies of the games. A team of 52 athletes competed in individual events, with three medals won in shooting. The restriction for individual athletes meant that the men's water polo team, the women's basketball team, and the men's and women's handball teams could not compete, despite having qualified for the Games.

The continued sanctions against FR Yugoslavia meant that no athletes could qualify to compete or even to compete under the Olympic flag at the 1994 Winter Olympics in Lillehammer. The sanctions were lifted in time for the next Olympiad.

At the 1996 Summer Olympics in Atlanta, Georgia, the team was designated Yugoslavia, using the same IOC code (YUG) as the former Socialist Federal Republic of Yugoslavia in 1988 and previous Games, despite the fact that FR Yugoslavia was not the sole successor to SFRY (cf. Agreement on Succession Issues of the Former Socialist Federal Republic of Yugoslavia). The team of 68 athletes participated in 13 sports and won four medals. In Sydney for the 2000 Summer Olympics, the Yugoslavia team participated with 111 athletes in 14 sports and won three medals.

In 2003, the Federal Republic of Yugoslavia reconstituted as the State Union of Serbia and Montenegro, and the nation was designated Serbia and Montenegro (SCG) for the first time at the 2004 Summer Olympics in Athens. The team of 87 athletes competed in 14 sports and won two silver medals.

After the Montenegrin independence referendum in 2006, the state union was dissolved and each nation declared independence. The Olympic Committee of Serbia succeeded the NOC for Serbia and Montenegro in June 2006, with approval of the Assembly of the Olympic Committee of Serbia and Montenegro. The newly formed Montenegrin Olympic Committee was recognized by the IOC in July 2007. At the 2008 Summer Olympics in Beijing, Serbia returned to the Olympics for the first time in 96 years under that name, while Montenegro made its debut as an independent nation.

== Timeline of participation ==
Olympic Year/s	Teams		
1912	Kingdom of Serbia		
1920–1936	Kingdom of Yugoslavia		
1948–1992 W	Yugoslavia		
1992 S	Independent Olympic Participants		
1994			
1996–2006	FR Yugoslavia/ Serbia and Montenegro		
2008–2010	Serbia		Montenegro
2012–2014	Serbia		Montenegro
2016–present	Serbia	Kosovo	Montenegro

== Medal tables ==
=== Medals by Summer Games ===
Medals won by the National Olympic Committee designated first with IOC code YUG then with SCG (upon the renaming of the nation, with no change in NOC territorial coverage):

Year	Sports	Competitors	Gold	Silver	Bronze	Total	Rank
1996 Atlanta	13	68	1	1	2	4	41
2000 Sydney	14	109	1	1	1	3	44
2004 Athens	14	87	0	2	0	2	61
Total			2	4	3	9	91

=== Medals by Winter Games ===
Year	Sports	Competitors	Gold	Silver	Bronze	Total	Rank
1998 Nagano	1	2	0	0	0	0	–
2002 Salt Lake City	2	6	0	0	0	0	–
2006 Turin	4	6	0	0	0	0	–
Total			0	0	0	0	–

=== Medals by summer sport ===
Sport	Gold	Silver	Bronze	Total
Shooting	1	2	1	4
Volleyball	1	0	1	2
Water polo	0	1	1	2
Basketball	0	1	0	1
Totals (4 entries)	2	4	3	9

== List of medalists ==
This list includes all competitors who won Olympic medals for Serbia and Montenegro (SCG), including under its previous designation as Federal Republic of Yugoslavia (FRY).

Medal	Name(s)	Games	Sport	Event
Gold	Aleksandra Ivošev	1996 Atlanta	Shooting	Women's 50m Rifle 3 Positions
Silver	Men's basketball team: Miroslav Berić Dejan Bodiroga Predrag Danilović Vlade Divac Aleksandar Đorđević Nikola Lončar Saša Obradović Žarko Paspalj Željko Rebrača Zoran Savić Dejan Tomašević Milenko Topić	1996 Atlanta	Basketball	Men's tournament
Bronze	Aleksandra Ivošev	1996 Atlanta	Shooting	Women's 10m Air Rifle
Bronze	Men's volleyball team: Vladimir Batez Dejan Brđović Đorđe Đurić Andrija Gerić Nikola Grbić Vladimir Grbić Rajko Jokanović Slobodan Kovač Đula Mešter Žarko Petrović Željko Tanasković Goran Vujević	1996 Atlanta	Volleyball	Men's tournament
Gold	Men's volleyball team: Vladimir Batez Slobodan Boškan Andrija Gerić Nikola Grbić Vladimir Grbić Slobodan Kovač Đula Mešter Vasa Mijić Ivan Miljković Veljko Petković Goran Vujević Igor Vušurović	2000 Sydney	Volleyball	Men's tournament
Silver	Jasna Šekarić	2000 Sydney	Shooting	Women's 10m Air Pistol
Bronze	Men's water polo team: Aleksandar Ćirić Danilo Ikodinović Viktor Jelenić Nikola Kuljača Aleksandar Šapić Dejan Savić Aleksandar Šoštar Petar Trbojević Veljko Uskoković Jugoslav Vasović Vladimir Vujasinović Nenad Vukanić Predrag Zimonjić	2000 Sydney	Water polo	Men's tournament
Silver	Jasna Šekarić	2004 Athens	Shooting	Women's 10 m air pistol
Silver	Men's water polo team: Aleksandar Ćirić Vladimir Gojković Danilo Ikodinović Viktor Jelenić Predrag Jokić Nikola Kuljača Slobodan Nikić Aleksandar Šapić Dejan Savić Denis Šefik Petar Trbojević Vanja Udovičić Vladimir Vujasinović	2004 Athens	Water polo	Men's competition

== Flagbearers ==
Flag bearers carry the national flag of their country at the opening ceremony of the Olympic Games.

Games	Season	Flagbearer	Sport
2006 Turin	Winter	Jelena Lolović (2)	Skiing
2004 Athens	Summer	Dejan Bodiroga	Basketball
2002 Salt Lake City	Winter	Jelena Lolović	Skiing
2000 Sydney	Summer	Vladimir Grbić	Volleyball
1998 Nagano	Winter	Marko Đorđević	Alpine skiing
1996 Atlanta	Summer	Igor Milanović	Water polo

== See also ==
- List of flag bearers for Serbia and Montenegro at the Olympics
- Serbia and Montenegro at the 2004 Summer Paralympics
