= Vladimir Batez =

Serbian volleyball player (born 1969)

Provincial Secretary for Sports and Youth
- Incumbent
- Assumed office 20 June 2016
- Preceded by: Marinika Tepić

Personal details
- Born: 7 September 1969 (age 56) Bijelo Polje, SR Montenegro, SFR Yugoslavia
- Party: Serbian Progressive Party

Vladimir Batez
Medal record

Men's volleyball

Representing Yugoslavia

Olympic Games
Gold medal – first place	2000 Sydney	Team
Bronze medal – third place	1996 Atlanta	Team

World Championship
Silver medal – second place	1998 Japan	

Vladimir Batez (Serbian Cyrillic: Владимир Батез; born 7 September 1969) is a Serbian politician and a retired volleyball player who competed for Yugoslavia in the 1996 Summer Olympics and in the 2000 Summer Olympics. He was the Provincial Secretary for Sports and Youth in the Government of Vojvodina from 2016 to 2020, serving under president Igor Mirović.

== Early life ==
Batez was born in Bijelo Polje, Montenegro, Yugoslavia.

== Career ==
In 1996, Batez was part of the Yugoslav team that won the bronze medal in the Olympic tournament. He played all eight matches.

Four years later, Batez won the gold medal with the Yugoslav team in the 2000 Olympic tournament. He played five matches.
