= Marko Đorđević (skier) =

Serbian alpine skier (born 1978)

Marko Đorđević (Serbian Cyrillic: Марко Ђорђевић; born in Belgrade, SR Serbia, SFR Yugoslavia on 6 September 1978) is a retired Serbian alpine skier. He participated at the 1998 and 2002 Winter Olympics. In 1998 he was a flagbearer for Federal Republic of Yugoslavia. His best Olympic result was 26th place in slalom in Salt Lake City.

== Olympic results ==
Event	Slalom	Giant Slalom
1998 Nagano	-	35.
2002 Salt Lake City	26.	41.
