= Montenegrin Olympic Committee =

National Olympic Committee

- Country: Montenegro
- Code: MNE
- Recognized: 7 July 2007
- Continental Association: EOC
- Headquarters: Podgorica, Montenegro
- President: Dušan Sinomović
- Secretary General: Andrija Popović
- Website: www.cok.me

The Montenegrin Olympic Committee (Montenegrin: Crnogorski olimpijski komitet; IOC Code: MNE) is the National Olympic Committee representing Montenegro. It is the umbrela sports organization in Montenegro, responsible for promoting the Olympic ideals and for ensuring that Montenegro is represented with athletes at the Olympic Games and other multi-sport events. The committee's president, as of January 2008, is Dušan Simonović.

Members of the committee are 16 Olympic sports federations, which elect the Executive Committee composed of the president and sixteen members.

The MOC organized the 2019 Games of the Small States of Europe in Budva.

== History ==
Following the May 2006 independence referendum, which saw Montenegro become a sovereign country, Montenegro's Olympic Committee (COK) was recognized as the 204th national member of the International Olympic Committee on 7 July 2007 at the 119th IOC session in Guatemala City, with the new assigned IOC code "MNE".

Montenegro's first appearance in the Olympics as an independent state came little more than a year later, at the 2008 Summer Olympics in Beijing, where it was represented by a team of 19 athletes, including 13 members of the national water polo team.

== List of presidents ==
President	Term
Dušan Sinomović	2008–present

== Executive committee ==
- President: Dušan Sinomović
- Vice presidents: Đuro Marić, Bojana Popović
- Members: dr Dimitrija Rašović, Jovica Rečević, Jelena Dubljević, Nikola Kažić, Predrag Vukčević, Zorica Kostić Vučićević, Momir Đurđevac, Gojko Banjević, Dragan Kopitović, Rajko Kosić, Danijela Franeta, Vanja Mugoša, Nikola Perišić, Radmila Petrović

== Member federations ==
The Montenegrin National Federations are the organizations that coordinate all aspects of their individual sports. They are responsible for training, competition and development of their sports. There are currently 15 Olympic Summer and one Winter Sport Federations in Montenegro.

National Federation	Summer or Winter	Headquarters
Athletic Federation of Montenegro	Summer	Podgorica
Basketball Federation of Montenegro	Summer	Podgorica
Montenegro Boxing Association	Summer	Podgorica
Football Association of Montenegro	Summer	Podgorica
Gymnastics Federation of Montenegro	Summer	Budva
Handball Federation of Montenegro	Summer	Podgorica
Montenegro Judo Federation	Summer	Podgorica
Montenegro Rugby Federation	Summer	Podgorica
Montenegro Sailing Federation	Summer	Herceg Novi
Shooting Federation of Montenegro	Summer	Podgorica
Montenegro Ski Association	Winter	Nikšić
Table Tennis Association of Montenegro	Summer	Podgorica
Taekwondo Association of Montenegro	Summer	Podgorica
Montenegro Tennis Association	Summer	Podgorica
Volleyball Federation of Montenegro	Summer	Podgorica
Water Polo and Swimming Federation of Montenegro	Summer	Kotor

== Awards ==
Since 1999, at the end of each calendar year proclaimed the most successful athletes. Initially declared Young Male Athlete, Young Female Athlete, Men's Team and Woman's Team, awards for the Sportsperson of the Year were introduced in 2011.

== See also ==
- Montenegro at the Olympics
