= Water polo at the 1960 Summer Olympics – Men's team squads =

The following is the list of squads that took part in the men's water polo tournament at the 1960 Summer Olympics.

- CF=Centre forward
- CB=Centre back
- D=Defender
- GK=Goalkeeper

== Argentina ==
The following players represented Argentina.

- Diego Wolf
- Jorge Lucey
- Alfredo Carnovali
- Roberto Fischer
- Pedro Consuegra
- Ernesto Parga
- Osvaldo Codaro

== Australia ==
The following players represented Australia.

- Michael Withers
- Graeme Sherman
- Keith Whitehead
- John O'Brien
- Ted Peirce
- Dick Thornett
- Tom Hoad
- Allan Charleston
- Keith Wiegard
- Des Clark

== Belgium ==
The following players represented Belgium.

- Bruno De Hesselle
- Jozef Smits
- Roger De Wilde
- Jacques Caufrier
- Nicolas Dumont
- Karel De Vis
- Léon Pickers

== Brazil ==
The following players represented Brazil.

- Jorge Cruz
- Rolando Cruz
- Roland da Cruz
- Luiz Daniel
- Hilton de Almeida
- Márvio dos Santos
- João Gonçalves Filho
- Adhemar Grijó Filho
- Henry Samson

== France ==
The following players represented France.

- Roland Moellé
- René Daubinet
- Alex Jany
- Claude Haas
- Claude Greder
- Roger Neubauer
- Charles Lambert
- Gérard Faetibolt
- André Lochon
- Jacques Meslier
- Jean-Paul Weil

== Hungary ==
Hungary entered a squad of 14 players. They scored 37 goals, including one own goal from the Belgian Jozef Smits.

Head coach: Béla Rajki

No.	Pos.	Player	DoB	Age	Caps	Club	Tournament games	Tournament goals
		András Bodnár	9 April 1942	18	?	(Hungary) Eger Sport Club	1	1
	GK	Ottó Boros	5 August 1929	31	?	(Hungary) Szolnoki Dózsa	5	0
		Zoltán Dömötör	21 August 1935	25	?	(Hungary) Újpesti Dózsa Sportegyesület	6	9
		László Felkai	1 March 1941	19	?	(Hungary) Ferencvárosi Torna Club	3	4
		Dezső Gyarmati	23 October 1927	32	?	(Hungary) Ferencvárosi Torna Club	6	2
		István Hevesi	2 April 1931	29	?	(Hungary) Budapesti Honvéd Sportegyesület	5	1
	GK	László Jeney	30 May 1923	37	?	(Hungary) Ferencvárosi Torna Club	2	0
		Tivadar Kanizsa	4 April 1933	27	?	(Hungary) Szolnoki Dózsa	6	6
		György Kárpáti	23 June 1935	25	?	(Hungary) Ferencvárosi Torna Club	4	5
		András Katona	20 February 1938	22	?	(Hungary) Budapesti Vasutas Sport Club	1	0
		János Konrád	27 August 1941	18	?	(Hungary) Budapesti Vasutas Sport Club	1	1
		Kálmán Markovits	26 August 1931	28	?	(Hungary) Budapesti Vasas Sport Club	4	1
		Mihály Mayer	27 December 1933	26	?	(Hungary) Újpesti Dózsa Sportegyesület	3	1
		Péter Rusorán	11 April 1940	20	?	(Hungary) Budapesti Vörös Meteor SK	2	5

== Italy ==
Italy entered a squad of twelve players. They scored 31 goals.

Head coach: Andres Zolyomy

No.	Pos.	Player	DoB	Age	Caps	Club	Tournament games	Tournament goals
		Amedeo Ambron	23 January 1939	21	?	(Italy) Fiamme Oro	1	1
		Danio Bardi	23 May 1937	23	?	(Italy) Fiamme Oro	6	2
		Giuseppe D'Altrui	7 April 1934	26	?	(Italy) Fiamme Oro	6	1
		Salvatore Gionta	22 December 1930	19	?	(Italy) S.S. Lazio Nuoto	2	2
		Giancarlo Guerrini	29 December 1939	20	?	(Italy) S.S. Lazio Nuoto	2	3
		Franco Lavoratori	15 March 1941	19	?	(Italy) Pro Recco	6	4
		Gianni Lonzi	4 August 1938	21	?	(Italy) Rari Nantes Florentia	5	0
		Luigi Mannelli	21 February 1939	21	?	(Italy) Circolo Canottieri Napoli	2	4
		Rosario Parmegiani	12 March 1937	23	?	(Italy) Rari Nantes Elah Pegli	6	7
		Eraldo Pizzo	21 April 1938	22	?	(Italy) Pro Recco	6	7
	GK	Dante Rossi	28 August 1936	23	?	(Italy) Società Sportiva Nervi	5	0
	GK	Brunello Spinelli	26 May 1939	21	?	(Italy) Fiamme Oro	2	0

== Japan ==
The following players represented Japan.

- Mineo Kato
- Kanji Asanuma
- Takanao Sato
- Yoji Shimizu
- Motonobu Miyamura
- Shigenobu Fujimoto
- Koki Takagi

== Netherlands ==
The following players represented the Netherlands.

- Ben Kniest
- Harry Lamme
- Fred van der Zwan
- Harro Ran
- Bram Leenards
- Harry Vriend
- Fred van Dorp
- Hans Muller
- Henk Hermsen

== Romania ==
The following players represented Romania.

- Mircea Ştefănescu
- Alexandru Bădiţă
- Aurel Zahan
- Gavril Blajek
- Alexandru Szabo
- Anatol Grinţescu
- Ştefan Kroner

== South Africa ==
The following players represented South Africa.

- William Aucamp
- Ron Meredith
- Leon Nahon
- Frank Butler
- Wally Voges
- Ronald Tinkler
- Stephanus Botha
- Robert Schwartz
- Allan Brown

== Soviet Union ==
The Soviet Union entered a squad of eleven players. They scored 30 goals.

Head coach: Vitaly Ushakov and Nikolai Malin

No.	Pos.	Player	DoB	Age	Caps	Club	Tournament games	Tournament goals
		Viktor Ageev	29 April 1936	24	?		2	0
		Givi Chikvanaia	29 May 1939	21	?	(Soviet Union) TsSK VMF	7	7
	GK	Leri Gogoladze	1 April 1938	22	?		3	0
	GK	Boris Goykhman	28 April 1919	41	?	(Soviet Union) TsSK VMF	4	0
		Yury Grigorovsky	28 March 1939	21	?		6	2
		Anatoly Kartashov	5 May 1937	23	?		7	5
		Vyacheslav Kurennoy	10 December 1932	27	?		7	9
		P'et're Mshveniyeradze	24 March 1929	31	?		7	5
		Vladimir Novikov	25 June 1937	23	?		1	0
		Yevgeny Saltsyn	26 February 1929	31	?		1	2
		Vladimir Semyonov	10 May 1938	22	?		5	0

== United Arab Republic ==
The following players represented the United Arab Republic.

- Abdel Aziz Khalifa
- Amin Abdel Rahman
- Ibrahim Abdel Rahman
- Azmi Isma'il
- Moustafa Bakri
- Moukhtar Hussain El-Gamal
- Gamal El-Nazer
- Dorri Abdel Kader
- Abdel Aziz El-Shafei
- Mohamed Abdel Hafiz

== United States ==
The United States entered a squad of eleven players. They scored 33 goals.

Head coach: Urho Saari (coach), Neill Kohlhase

No.	Pos.	Player	DoB	Age	Caps	Club	Tournament games	Tournament goals
		Chuck Bittick	2 November 1939	20	?	(United States) Los Angeles Swim Stadium	5	3
		Marvin Burns	6 July 1928	32	?	(United States) Lynwood Swim Club	5	0
		Ronald Crawford	6 December 1939	20	?	(United States) Phillips 66 Long Beach	6	5
	GK	Gordie Hall	27 November 1935	24	?	(United States) Lynwood Swim Club	3	0
	GK	Robert Horn	1 November 1931	28	?	(United States) Southern California Water Polo Club	4	0
		Jim Kelsey			?		0	0
		Charles McIlroy	1 August 1938	22	?	(United States) El Segundo Swim Club	1	0
		Ronald Severa	13 August 1936	24	?	(United States) Northwestern University	7	4
		Fred Tisue	17 October 1938	21	?	(United States) Lynwood Swim Club	7	12
		Ron Volmer	22 November 1935	24	?	(United States) Los Angeles Swim Stadium	4	4
		Wally Wolf	2 October 1930	29	?	(United States) Lynwood Swim Club	7	5

== United Team of Germany ==
The following players represented the United Team of Germany.

- Hans Hoffmeister
- Achim Schneider
- Hans Schepers
- Bernd Strasser
- Lajos Nagy
- Friedhelm Osselmann
- Dieter Seiz
- Emil Bildstein
- Jürgen Honig

== Yugoslavia ==
Yugoslavia entered a squad of eleven players. They scored 27 goals.

Head coach:

No.	Pos.	Player	DoB	Age	Caps	Club	Tournament games	Tournament goals
		Ivo Cipci	25 April 1933	27	?		0	0
		Boris Čukvas			?		0	0
		Zdravko Ježić	17 August 1931	29	?	(Socialist Federal Republic of Yugoslavia) HAVK Mladost	7	4
		Hrvoje Kačić	12 January 1932	28	?	(Socialist Federal Republic of Yugoslavia) VK Jug Dubrovnik	7	4
	GK	Milan Muškatirović	9 March 1934	26	?	(Socialist Federal Republic of Yugoslavia) VK Partizan	7	0
		Ante Nardelli	15 April 1937	23	?	(Socialist Federal Republic of Yugoslavia) Jadran Split	7	5
		Đuro Radan			?		0	0
		Mirko Sandić	9 May 1942	18	?	(Socialist Federal Republic of Yugoslavia) VK Partizan	6	3
		Zlatko Šimenc	29 November 1938	21	?	(Socialist Federal Republic of Yugoslavia) HAVK Mladost	7	4
		Božidar Stanišić	21 October 1938	21	?	(Socialist Federal Republic of Yugoslavia) Jadran Split	1	1
		Marijan Žužej	8 November 1934	25	?	(Socialist Federal Republic of Yugoslavia) HAVK Mladost	7	6
