= Italy at the 1960 Summer Olympics =

- IOC code: ITA
- NOC: Italian National Olympic Committee

in Rome
- Competitors: 280 (246 men, 34 women) in 19 sports
- Flag bearer: Edoardo Mangiarotti
- Medals Ranked 3rd: Gold 13 Silver 10 Bronze 13 Total 36

Summer Olympics appearances (overview)
- 1896; 1900; 1904; 1908; 1912; 1920; 1924; 1928; 1932; 1936; 1948; 1952; 1956; 1960; 1964; 1968; 1972; 1976; 1980; 1984; 1988; 1992; 1996; 2000; 2004; 2008; 2012; 2016; 2020; 2024

Other related appearances
- 1906 Intercalated Games

Italy was the host nation for the 1960 Summer Olympics in Rome. It was the first time that the nation had hosted the Summer Games, and the second time overall (after the 1956 Winter Olympics in Cortina d'Ampezzo). It also hosted the 1960 Summer Paralympics in Rome – the inaugural Paralympic Games.

280 competitors, 246 men and 34 women, took part in 138 events in 19 sports.

== Medals ==
=== Gold ===
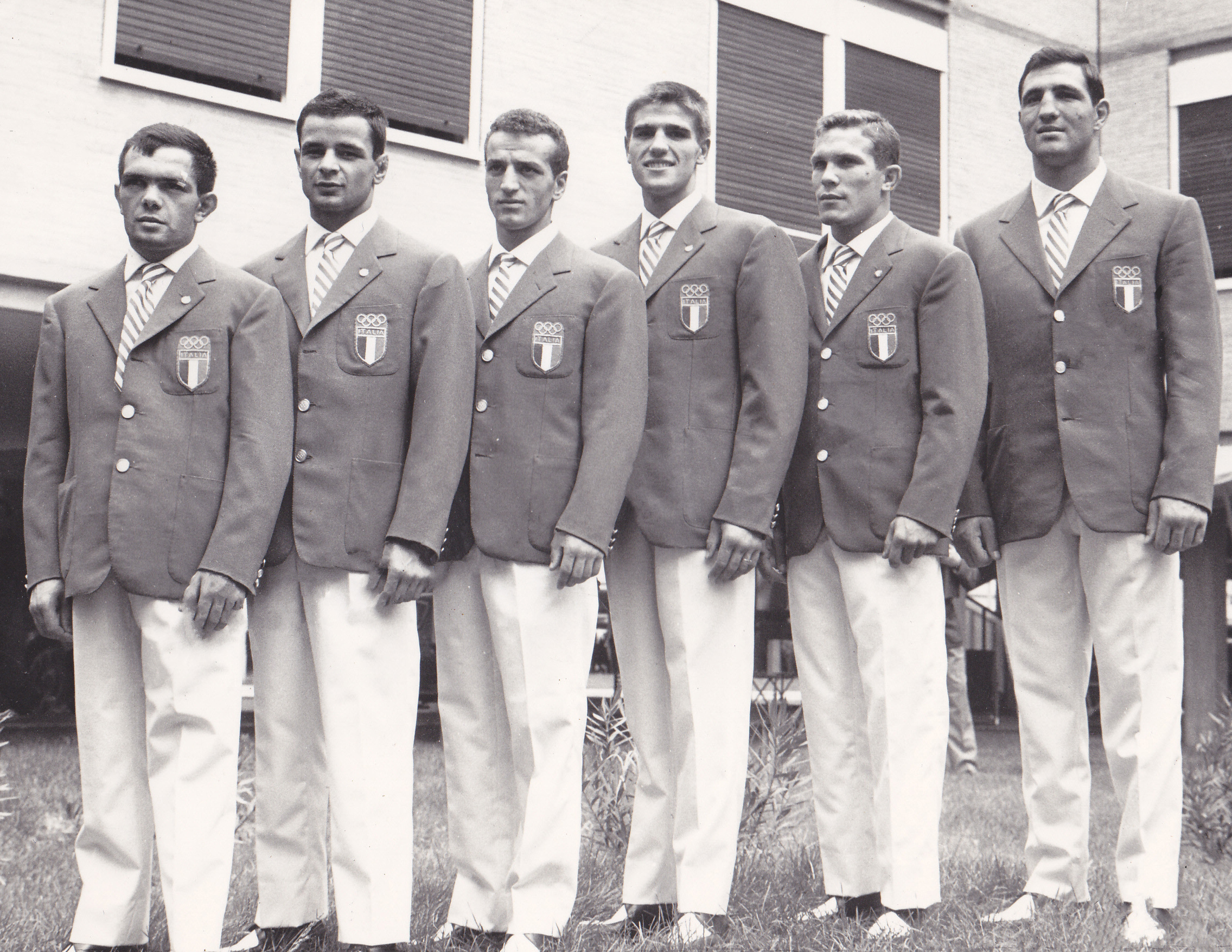
Italian medalists in boxing, left-right: Primo Zamparini, Francesco Musso, Sandro Lopopolo, Nino Benvenuti, Carmelo Bossi and Francesco de Piccoli

- Livio Berruti – Athletics, 200m, men
- Luigi Arienti, Franco Testa, Mario Vallotto, Marino Vigna – Track Cycling, team pursuit, 4000m, men
- Sante Gaiardoni – Track Cycling, sprint, men
- Sergio Bianchetto, Giuseppe Beghetto – Track Cycling, tandem, 2,000 men
- Sante Gaiardoni – Track Cycling, time trial, 1.000m, men
- Francesco Musso – Boxing, Featherweight (54–57 kg), men
- Giovanni Benvenuti – Boxing, welterweight (63.5 to 67 kg), men
- Francesco De Piccoli – Boxing, Heavyweight (+81 kg), men
- Raimondo D'Inzeo – Equestrian, jumping, individual
- Giuseppe Delfino – Fencing, épée, men
- Giuseppe Delfino, Alberto Pellegrino, Carlo Pavesi, Edoardo Mangiarotti, Fiorenzo Marini, Gianluigi Saccaro – Fencing, sword, team, men
- Danio Bardi, Giuseppe D'Altrui, Franco Lavoratori, Gianni Lonzi, Rosario Parmegiani, Eraldo Pizzo, Dante Rossi, Amedeo Ambron, Salvatore Gionta, Luigi Mannelli, Brunello Spinelli, Giancarlo Guerrini – Waterpolo, men
- Antonio Bailetti, Ottavio Cogliati, Giacomo Fornoni, Livio Trapè – Cycling, TTT, men

=== Silver ===
- Primo Zamparini – Boxing, Bantamweight (51–54 kg), men
- Carmelo Bossi – Boxing, half-middleweight (67–71 kg), men
- Alessandro Lopopolo – Boxing, lightweight (57–60 kg), men
- Aldo Dezi, Francesco La Macchia – Canoeing, C-2 1000m, men
- Piero D'Inzeo – Equestrian, jumping, individual
- Tullio Baraglia, Renato Bosatta, Giancarlo Crosta, Giuseppe Galante – Rowing, four-without-mate, men
- Alberto Pellegrino, Luigi Arturo Carpaneda, Mario Curletto, Aldo Aureggi, Edoardo Mangiarotti – Screens, Foil, team, men
- Galliano Rossini – Shooting, stairway, 125 targets, men
- Giovanni Carminucci – Gymnastics, bridge, men
- Livio Trapè – Cycling, road race, men

=== Bronze ===
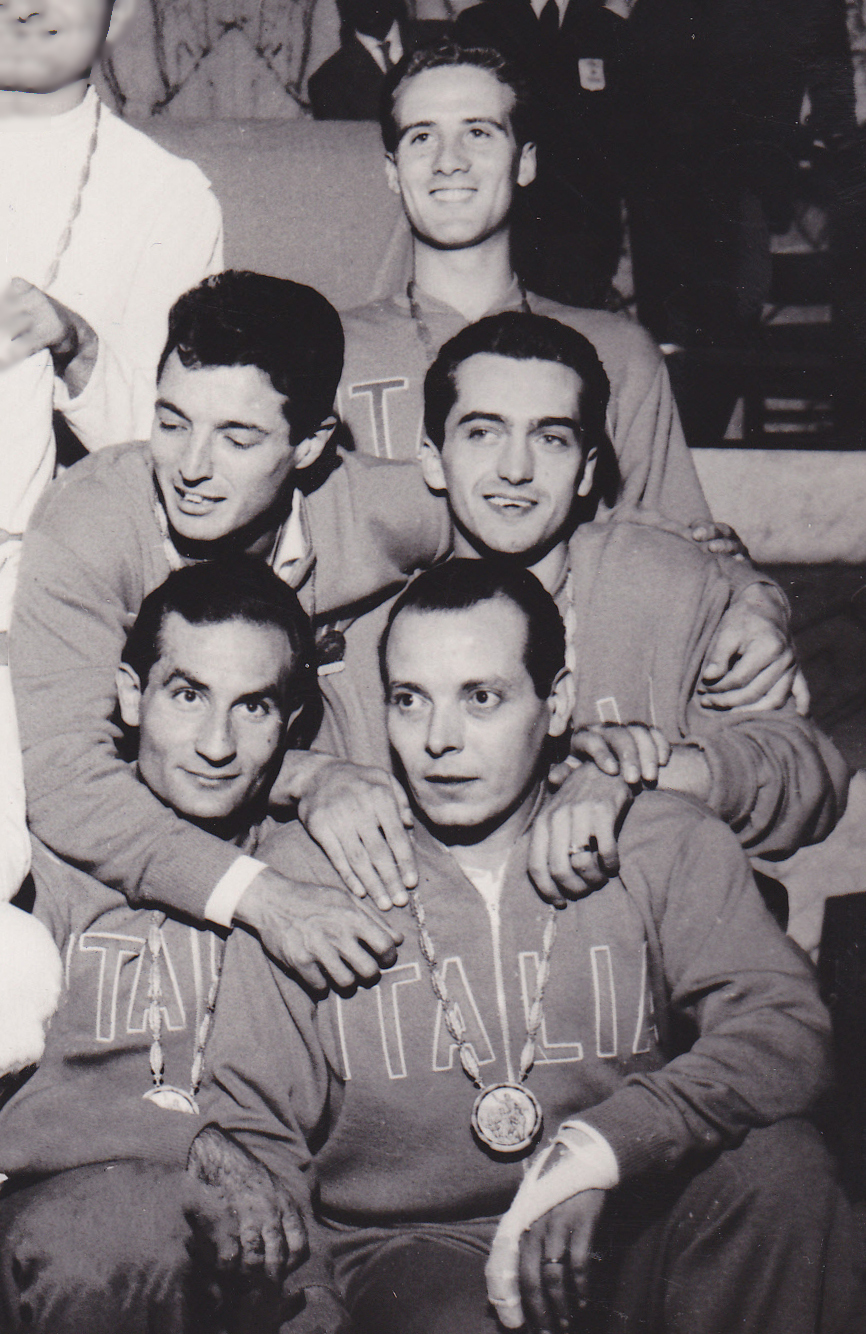
Italian sabre team, from top: Pierluigi Chicca, Mario Ravagnan, Giampaolo Calanchini, Wladimiro Calarese and Roberto Ferrari (injured)

- Giuseppina Leone – Athletics, 100m, women
- Abdon Pamich – Athletics, 50 km walk, men
- Valentino Gasparella – Track Cycling, sprint, men
- Giulio Saraudi – Boxing, light heavyweight (75–81 kg), men
- Sebastiano Mannironi – Weightlifting, Featherweight (56–60 kg), men
- Raimondo D'Inzeo, Piero D'Inzeo, Antonio Oppes – Equestrian, jumping, team
- Fulvio Balatti, Romano Sgheiz, Franco Trincavelli, Giovanni Zucchi, Ivo Stefanoni – Rowing, four -with-mate
- Bruna Colombetti, Velleda Cesari, Claudia Pasini, Irene Camber, Antonella Ragno-Lonzi – Fencing, Foil, team, women
- Wladimiro Calarese – Fencing, saber, individual, men
- Wladimiro Calarese, Giampaolo Calanchini, Pierluigi Chicca, Roberto Ferrari, Mario Ravagnan – Fencing, saber, team, men
- Giovanni Carminucci, Pasquale Carminucci, Gianfranco Marzolla, Franco Menichelli, Orlando Polmonari, Angelo Vicardi – Gymnastics, men's team
- Franco Menichelli – Gymnastics, floor, men
- Antonio Cosentino, Antonio Ciciliano, Giulio De Stefano – Sailing, Dragon class

== Athletics ==
=== Results ===
Men (39)
| Athlete | Age | Event | Rank | Medal |
| Livio Berruti | 21 | Men's 200 metres | 1 | Gold |
| Salvatore Giannone | 24 | Men's 200 metres | 7 h3 r2/4 | |
| Armando Sardi | 19 | Men's 200 metres | 3 h10r1/4 | |
| Giuseppe Bommarito | 26 | Men's 400 metres | 5 h4 r2/4 | |
| Gianfranco Baraldi | 24 | Men's 800 metres | 5 h8 r1/4 | |
| Alfredo Rizzo | 27 | Men's 1,500 metres | 8 h2 r1/2 | |
| Luigi Conti | 22 | Men's 5,000 metres | 12 | |
| Franco Antonelli | 26 | Men's 10,000 metres | 27 | |
| Francesco Perrone | 29 | Men's Marathon | 37 | |
| Silvio De Florentis | 25 | Men's Marathon | 38 | |
| Vito Di Terlizzi | 30 | Men's Marathon | AC | |
| Nereo Svara | 24 | Men's 110 metres Hurdles | 4 h1 r3/4 | |
| Giovanni Cornacchia | 21 | Men's 110 metres Hurdles | 4 h1 r2/4 | |
| Paolo Zamboni | 21 | Men's 110 metres Hurdles | 6 h2 r2/4 | |
| Salvatore Morale | 21 | Men's 400 metres Hurdles | 4 h2 r2/3 | |
| Elio Catola | 24 | Men's 400 metres Hurdles | 5 h1 r2/3 | |
| Moreno Martini | 25 | Men's 400 metres Hurdles | 7 h1 r2/3 | |
| Armando Sardi | 19 | Men's 4 × 100 metres Relay | 4 | |
| Pier Giorgio Cazzola | 23 | Men's 4 × 100 metres Relay | 4 | |
| Salvatore Giannone | 24 | Men's 4 × 100 metres Relay | 4 | |
| Livio Berruti | 21 | Men's 4 × 100 metres Relay | 4 | |
| Giuseppe Bommarito | 26 | Men's 4 × 400 metres Relay | 4 h1 r2/3 | |
| Mario Fraschini | 21 | Men's 4 × 400 metres Relay | 4 h1 r2/3 | |
| Nereo Fossati | 23 | Men's 4 × 400 metres Relay | 4 h1 r2/3 | |
| Renato Panciera | 25 | Men's 4 × 400 metres Relay | 4 h1 r2/3 | |
| Stefano Serchinich | 30 | Men's 20 kilometres Walk | 21 | |
| Luigi De Rosso | 25 | Men's 20 kilometres Walk | 22 | |
| Gianni Corsaro | 35 | Men's 20 kilometres Walk | 26 | |
| Abdon Pamich | 26 | Men's 50 kilometres Walk | 3 | Bronze |
| Pino Dordoni | 34 | Men's 50 kilometres Walk | 7 | |
| Antonio De Gaetano | 26 | Men's 50 kilometres Walk | 10 | |
| Attilio Bravi | 23 | Men's Long Jump | 10 | |
| Luigi Ulivelli | 24 | Men's Long Jump | AC QR | |
| Pier Luigi Gatti | 22 | Men's triple jump | AC r2/2 | |
| Enzo Cavalli | 22 | Men's triple jump | 16 QR | |
| Frederico Bisson | 24 | Men's triple jump | 27 QR | |
| Silvano Meconi | 28 | Men's Shot Put | 13 | |
| Carmelo Rado | 27 | Men's Discus Throw | 7 | |
| Adolfo Consolini | 43 | Men's Discus Throw | 17 | |
| Franco Grossi | 21 | Men's Discus Throw | 29 QR | |
| Carlo Lievore | 22 | Men's Javelin Throw | 9 | |
| Franco Sar | 26 | Men's Decathlon | 6 | |
| Luciano Paccagnella | 21 | Men's Decathlon | 13 | |
Women (8)
| Athlete | Age | Event | Rank | Medal |
| Giuseppina Leone | 25 | Women's 100 metres | 3 | Bronze |
| Giuseppina Leone | 25 | Women's 200 metres | 6 | |
| Gilda Jannaccone | 20 | Women's 800 metres | 5 h2 r1/2 | |
| Letizia Bertoni | 23 | Women's 80 metres Hurdles | 3 h6 r1/3 | |
| Letizia Bertoni | 23 | Women's 4 × 100 metres Relay | 5 | |
| Sandra Valenti | 20 | Women's 4 × 100 metres Relay | 5 | |
| Piera Tizzoni | 20 | Women's 4 × 100 metres Relay | 5 | |
| Giuseppina Leone | 25 | Women's 4 × 100 metres Relay | 5 | |
| Marinella Bortoluzzi | 21 | Women's High Jump | 19 QR | |
| Piera Tizzoni | 20 | Women's Long Jump | 21 QR | |
| Elivia Ricci | 23 | Women's Discus Throw | 15 QR | |
| Paola Paternoster | 24 | Women's Discus Throw | 20 QR | |

== Basketball ==
Men's Team Competition

- Team Roster

- Mario Alesini
- Antonio Calebotta
- Achille Canna
- Alessandro Gamba
- Giovanni Gavagnin
- Augusto Giomo
- Gianfranco Lombardi
- Gianfranco Pieri
- Alessandro Riminucci
- Gianfranco Sardagna
- Gabriele Vianello
- Paolo Vittori

== Cycling ==
14 cyclists, all men, represented Italy in 1960.

Individual road race

- Livio Trapè
- Antonio Bailetti
- Giuseppe Tonucci
- Vendramino Bariviera

Team time trial

- Antonio Bailetti
- Ottavio Cogliati
- Giacomo Fornoni
- Livio Trapè

Sprint

- Sante Gaiardoni
- Valentino Gasparella

1000m time trial

- Sante Gaiardoni

Tandem

- Giuseppe Beghetto
- Sergio Bianchetto

Team pursuit

- Luigi Arienti
- Franco Testa
- Mario Vallotto
- Marino Vigna

== Diving ==
Men

| Athlete | Event | Preliminary | | Semi-final | | | | Final | | | |
| Athlete | Event | Points | Rank | Points | Rank | Total | Rank | Points | Rank | Total | Rank |
|---|---|---|---|---|---|---|---|---|---|---|---|
| Lamberto Mari | 3 m springboard | 55.04 | 5 Q | 41.45 | 4 | 96.49 | 4 Q | 47.48 | 6 | 143.97 | 6 |
| Walter Messa | 3 m springboard | 53.47 | 9 Q | 38.81 | =11 | 92.28 | 10 | Did not advance | | | |
| Fabio Paiella | 10 m platform | 50.01 | =18 | Did not advance | | | | | | | |
| Antonio Sbordone | 10 m platform | 51.90 | 11 Q | 36.87 | 13 | 88.77 | 14 | Did not advance | | | |

Women

| Athlete | Event | Preliminary | | Final | | | |
| Athlete | Event | Points | Rank | Points | Rank | Total | Rank |
|---|---|---|---|---|---|---|---|
| Laura Conter | 10 m platform | 45.55 | 17 | Did not advance | | | |

== Fencing ==
20 fencers, 15 men and 5 women, represented Italy in 1960.

Men's foil

- Luigi Carpaneda
- Alberto Pellegrino
- Mario Curletto

Men's team foil

- Edoardo Mangiarotti, Luigi Carpaneda, Alberto Pellegrino, Mario Curletto, Aldo Aureggi

Men's épée

- Giuseppe Delfino
- Giovanni Battista Breda
- Alberto Pellegrino

Men's team épée

- Edoardo Mangiarotti, Giuseppe Delfino, Carlo Pavesi, Alberto Pellegrino, Fiorenzo Marini, Gianluigi Saccaro

Men's sabre

- Wladimiro Calarese
- Roberto Ferrari
- Pierluigi Chicca

Men's team sabre

- Wladimiro Calarese, Giampaolo Calanchini, Pierluigi Chicca, Mario Ravagnan, Roberto Ferrari

Women's foil

- Antonella Ragno-Lonzi
- Irene Camber-Corno
- Bruna Colombetti-Peroncini

Women's team foil

- Antonella Ragno-Lonzi, Irene Camber-Corno, Velleda Cesari, Bruna Colombetti-Peroncini, Claudia Pasini

== Football ==
Men's Team Competition

- Team Roster

- Luciano Alfieri
- Tarcisio Burgnich
- Mario Trebbi
- Paride Tumburus
- Sandro Salvadore
- Giovanni Trapattoni
- Giancarlo Cella
- Giovanni Rivera
- Ugo Tomeazzi
- Giacomo Bulgarelli
- Giorgio Rossano
- Orazio Rancati
- Giorgio Ferrini
- Giovanni Fanello
- Gilberto Noletti
- Luciano Magistrelli
- Giandomenico Baldiserri
- Armando Favali
- Ambrogio Pelagalli

== Modern pentathlon ==
Three male pentathletes represented Italy in 1960.

Individual

- Adriano Facchini
- Gaetano Scala
- Giulio Giunta

Team

- Adriano Facchini
- Gaetano Scala
- Giulio Giunta

== Rowing ==
Italy had 26 male rowers participate in all seven rowing events in 1960.

Men's single sculls

- Savino Rebek

Men's double sculls

- Severino Lucini
- Cesarino Pestuggia

Men's coxless pair

- Paolo Mosetti
- Mario Petri

Men's coxed pair

- Giancarlo Piretta
- Renzo Ostino
- Vincenzo Bruno (cox)

Men's coxless four

- Tullio Baraglia
- Renato Bosatta
- Giancarlo Crosta
- Giuseppe Galante

Men's coxed four

- Fulvio Balatti
- Romano Sgheiz
- Franco Trincavelli
- Giovanni Zucchi
- Ivo Stefanoni (cox)

Men's eight

- Paolo Amorini
- Vasco Cantarello
- Gian Carlo Casalini
- Luigi Prato
- Vincenzo Prina
- Nazzareno Simonato
- Luigi Spozio
- Armido Torri
- Giuseppe Pira (cox)

== Shooting ==
Nine shooters represented Italy in 1960.

25 m pistol

- Roberto Mazzoni
- Sergio Varetto

50 m pistol

- Piercarlo Beroldi
- Giorgio Ercolani

50 m rifle, three positions

- Vincenzo Biava
- Sergio Rolandi

50 m rifle, prone

- Mariano Antonelli

Trap

- Galliano Rossini
- Edoardo Casciano

== Swimming ==
Men

| Athlete | Event | Heat | | Semifinal | | Final | |
| Athlete | Event | Time | Rank | Time | Rank | Time | Rank |
|---|---|---|---|---|---|---|---|
| Ezio Della Savia | 100 m freestyle | 58.2 | =23 Q | 58.4 | =20 | Did not advance | |
| Giorgio Perondini | 100 m freestyle | 58.9 | 30 | Did not advance | | | |
| Paolo Galletti | 400 m freestyle | 4:36.6 | 17 | —N/a | | Did not advance | |
| Massimo Rosi | 400 m freestyle | 4:45.1 | 28 | —N/a | | Did not advance | |
| Paolo Galletti | 1500 m freestyle | 20:28.2 | 28 | —N/a | | Did not advance | |
| Massimo Rosi | 1500 m freestyle | 19:52.9 | 26 | —N/a | | Did not advance | |
| Giuseppe Avellone | 100 m backstroke | 1:05.4 | 16 Q | 1:06.5 | 16 | Did not advance | |
| Gilberto Elsa | 100 m backstroke | 1:05.8 | =18 | Did not advance | | | |
| Roberto Lazzari | 200 m breaststroke | 2:41.2 | =8 Q | 2:40.3 | 7 Q | 2:40.1 | 5 |
| Pierpaolo Spangaro | 200 m breaststroke | 2:53.8 | 34 | Did not advance | | | |
| Fritz Dennerlein | 200 m butterfly | 2:18.3 | 4 Q | 2:20.5 | 4 Q | 2:16.0 | 4 |
| Giampiero Fossati | 200 m butterfly | 2:31.9 | 26 | Did not advance | | | |
| Fritz Dennerlein; Bruno Bianchi; Angelo Romani; Paolo Galletti | 4 × 200 m freestyle | 8:38.1 | 11 | —N/a | | Did not advance | |
| Giuseppe Avellone; Roberto Lazzari; Fritz Dennerlein; Bruno Bianchi | 4 × 100 m medley | 4:16.0 | =4 Q | —N/a | | 4:17.2 | 6 |

Women

| Athlete | Event | Heat | | Semifinal | | Final | |
| Athlete | Event | Time | Rank | Time | Rank | Time | Rank |
|---|---|---|---|---|---|---|---|
| Maria Cristina Pacifici | 100 m freestyle | 1:07.1 | 20 | Did not advance | | | |
| Paola Saini | 100 m freestyle | 1:04.4 | =7 Q | 1:05.4 | =11 | Did not advance | |
| Paola Saini | 400 m freestyle | 5:13.1 | 14 | —N/a | | Did not advance | |
| Welleda Veschi | 400 m freestyle | 5:18.3 | 16 | —N/a | | Did not advance | |
| Arlette Faidiga | 100 m backstroke | 1:18.5 | 23 | —N/a | | Did not advance | |
| Daniela Serpilli | 100 m backstroke | 1:20.3 | 26 | —N/a | | Did not advance | |
| Luciana Marcellini | 200 m breaststroke | 2:57.0 | 10 | —N/a | | Did not advance | |
| Elena Zennaro | 200 m breaststroke | 1:20.3 | 26 | —N/a | | Did not advance | |
| Anna Beneck | 100 m butterfly | 1:18.4 | =20 | —N/a | | Did not advance | |
| Anna Maria Cecchi | 100 m butterfly | 1:19.5 | 23 | —N/a | | Did not advance | |
| Paola Saini; Anna Maria Cecchi; Rosanna Contardo; Maria Cristina Pacifici; Daniela Beneck | 4 × 100 m freestyle | 4:31.8 | 7 Q | —N/a | | 4:26.8 | 7 |
| Daniela Serpilli; Elena Zennaro; Anna Beneck; Paola Saini | 4 × 100 m medley | 5:04.4 | 11 | —N/a | | Did not advance | |

== Water polo ==
Men's Team Competition

- Team Roster

- Amedeo Ambron
- Danio Bardi
- Giuseppe d'Altrui
- Salvatore Gionta
- Giancarlo Guerrini
- Franco Lavoratori
- Gianni Lonzi
- Luigi Mannelli
- Rosario Parmegiani
- Eraldo Pizzo
- Dante Rossi
- Brunella Spinelli

== See also ==
- Italy at the 1960 Summer Paralympics
