= Water polo at the 1956 Summer Olympics – Men's team squads =

The following is the list of squads that took part in the men's water polo tournament at the 1956 Summer Olympics.

- CF=Centre forward
- CB=Centre back
- D=Defender
- GK=Goalkeeper

== Australia ==
Australia entered a squad of nine players.

Head coach:

| No. | Pos. | Player | DoB | Age | Caps | Club | Tournament games | Tournament goals |
|---|---|---|---|---|---|---|---|---|
| | | Peter Bennett | 11 July 1926 | 30 | ? | (Australia) Melbourne SC | ? | ? |
| | | Jake Foster | 11 May 1931 | 25 | ? | (Australia) Brighton | ? | ? |
| | | Doug Laing | 19 March 1931 | 25 | ? | (Australia) Bondi ASC | ? | ? |
| | | William McCabe | 30 August 1935 | 21 | ? | | ? | ? |
| | | John O'Brien | 8 October 1931 | 25 | ? | | ? | ? |
| | | Bill Orchard | 31 October 1929 | 27 | ? | | ? | ? |
| | | Ted Peirce | 3 July 1933 | 23 | ? | (Australia) Balmain Water Polo Club | ? | ? |
| | | Raymond Smee | 25 October 1930 | 26 | ? | (Australia) Bondi ASC | ? | ? |
| | | Keith Whitehead | 9 September 1931 | 24 | ? | | ? | ? |

== Great Britain ==
Great Britain entered an unknown number of players. They scored 25 goals but all scorers are unknown.

Head coach:

| No. | Pos. | Player | DoB | Age | Caps | Club | Tournament games | Tournament goals |
|---|---|---|---|---|---|---|---|---|
| | | John Ferguson | 4 April 1930 | 26 | ? | (United Kingdom) Motherwell | 3 | ? |
| | GK | Arthur Grady | 5 August 1922 | 34 | ? | (United Kingdom) Plaistow United | 5 | 0 |
| | | John Jones | 17 April 1925 | 31 | ? | (United Kingdom) Cheltenham | 4 | ? |
| | | Robert Knights | 22 July 1931 | 25 | ? | (United Kingdom) Polytechnic | 1 | ? |
| | | Terence Miller | 2 March 1932 | 24 | lots | (United Kingdom) Plaistow United and The Penguins | 4 | ? |
| | | Peter Pass | 8 March 1933 | 23 | ? | (United Kingdom) Polytechnic | 5 | ? |
| | | Clifford Spooner | 21 December 1933 | 22 | ? | (United Kingdom) Sutton & Cheam and Newport | 3 | ? |
| | | Ron Turner | 11 June 1929 | 27 | ? | (United Kingdom) The Penguins | 5 | ? |
| | | Gerald Worsell | 1 May 1930 | 26 | ? | (United Kingdom) Sutton & Cheam | 5 | ? |

== Hungary ==
Hungary entered a squad of eleven players. They scored 26 goals but only twenty scorers are known.

Head coach: Béla Rajki

| No. | Pos. | Player | DoB | Age | Caps | Club | Tournament games | Tournament goals |
|---|---|---|---|---|---|---|---|---|
| | | Antal Bolvári | 6 May 1932 | 24 | ? | (Hungary) Budapesti Honvéd Sportegyesület | 4 | 2 |
| | GK | Ottó Boros | 5 August 1929 | 27 | ? | (Hungary) Szolnoki Dózsa | 4 | 0 |
| | | Dezső Gyarmati | 23 October 1927 | 29 | ? | (Hungary) Budapesti Dózsa | 6 | 3 |
| | | István Hevesi | 2 April 1931 | 25 | ? | (Hungary) Budapesti Honvéd Sportegyesület | 3 | ? |
| | GK | László Jeney | 30 May 1923 | 33 | ? | (Hungary) Budapesti Vasas Sport Club | 2 | 0 |
| | | Tivadar Kanizsa | 4 April 1933 | 23 | ? | (Hungary) Szolnoki Dózsa | 2 | ? |
| | | György Kárpáti | 23 June 1935 | 21 | ? | (Hungary) Budapesti Kinizsi | 6 | 6 |
| | | Kálmán Markovits | 26 August 1931 | 25 | ? | (Hungary) Budapesti Vasas Sport Club | 6 | 3 |
| | | Mihály Mayer | 27 December 1933 | 22 | ? | (Hungary) Budapesti Dózsa | 4 | 1 |
| | | István Szivós | 20 August 1920 | 36 | ? | (Hungary) Budapesti Vasas Sport Club | 1 | ? |
| | | Ervin Zádor | 7 June 1935 | 21 | ? | (Hungary) Vasas Sport Club Hajógyár SK | 4 | 5 |
| | | Miklos Martin | 29 June 1931 | 24 | ? | (Hungary) Budapesti Dózsa | 6 | 5 |

== Italy ==
Italy entered a squad of eleven players. They scored 17 goals but all scorers are unknown.

Head coach: Mario Majoni

| No. | Pos. | Player | DoB | Age | Caps | Club | Tournament games | Tournament goals |
|---|---|---|---|---|---|---|---|---|
| | GK | Cosimo Antonelli | 23 July 1925 | 31 | ? | (Italy) S.S. Lazio Nuoto | 1 | 0 |
| | | Alfonso Buonocore | 11 March 1933 | 23 | ? | (Italy) Circolo Canottieri Napoli | 5 | ? |
| | GK | Enzo Cavazzoni | 2 March 1932 | 24 | ? | (Italy) Rari Nantes Camogli | 5 | ? |
| | | Maurizio D'Achille | 1932 | | ? | (Italy) A.S. Roma Pallanuoto | 2 | ? |
| | | Giuseppe D'Altrui | 7 April 1934 | 22 | ? | (Italy) Rari Nantes Napoli | 5 | ? |
| | | Fritz Dennerlein | 14 March 1936 | 20 | ? | (Italy) Circolo Canottieri Napoli | 6 | ? |
| | | Luigi Mannelli | 21 February 1939 | 17 | ? | (Italy) Circolo Canottieri Napoli | 1 | ? |
| | | Angelo Marciani | 19 April 1928 | 28 | ? | (Italy) Rari Nantes Camogli | 6 | ? |
| | | Rosario Parmegiani | 12 March 1937 | 19 | ? | (Italy) Rari Nantes Napoli | 0 | 0 |
| | | Paolo Pucci | 1935 | | ? | (Italy) S.S. Lazio Nuoto | 5 | ? |
| | | Cesare Rubini | 2 November 1923 | 33 | ? | (Italy) A.S. Roma Pallanuoto | 6 | ? |

== Romania ==
Romania entered a squad of nine players. They scored 26 goals but all scorers are unknown.

Head coach: Balint Adalbert

| No. | Pos. | Player | DoB | Age | Caps | Club | Tournament games | Tournament goals |
|---|---|---|---|---|---|---|---|---|
| | | Alexandru Bădiţă | 2 October 1937 | 18 | ? | | 3 | ? |
| | | Ivan Bordi | 1938 | | ? | | 3 | ? |
| | GK | Iosif Deutsch | 1932 | | ? | | 1 | 0 |
| | | Zoltan Hospodar | 8 March 1933 | 23 | ? | | 5 | ? |
| | GK | Alexandru Marinescu | 23 October 1932 | 24 | ? | | 4 | 0 |
| | | Gavril Nagy | 21 August 1932 | 24 | ? | | 5 | ? |
| | | Francisc Şimon | 8 January 1927 | 29 | ? | | 5 | ? |
| | | Alexandru Szabo | 20 January 1937 | 19 | ? | | 4 | ? |
| | | Aurel Zahan | 8 August 1938 | 18 | ? | | 5 | ? |

== Singapore ==
The following players represented Singapore.

- David Lim
- Thio Gim Hock
- Lionel Chee
- Eric Yeo
- Gan Eng Teck
- Wiebe Wolters
- Tan Eng Bock
- Skip Wolters
- Oh Chwee Hock
- Lim Teck Pan

== Soviet Union ==
The Soviet Union entered a squad of eleven players. They scored 21 goals.

Head coach:

| No. | Pos. | Player | DoB | Age | Caps | Club | Tournament games | Tournament goals |
|---|---|---|---|---|---|---|---|---|
| | | Viktor Ageev | 29 April 1936 | 20 | ? | | 7 | 2 |
| | | Pyotr Breus | 2 December 1927 | 28 | ? | | 2 | 0 |
| | GK | Boris Goykhman | 28 April 1919 | 37 | ? | | 6 | 0 |
| | | Nodar Gvakhariya | 16 April 1932 | 24 | ? | | 3 | 4 |
| | | Vyacheslav Kurennoy | 10 December 1932 | 23 | ? | | 7 | 3 |
| | | Georgy Lezin | | | ? | | 0 | 0 |
| | | Boris Markarov | 12 March 1935 | 21 | ? | | 4 | 1 |
| | | P'et're Mshveniyeradze | 24 March 1929 | 27 | ? | | 7 | 11 |
| | | Valentin Prokopov | 10 June 1929 | 27 | ? | | 6 | 0 |
| | GK | Mikhail Ryzhak | 10 March 1927 | 28 | ? | | 1 | 0 |
| | | Yury Shlyapin | 11 February 1932 | 24 | ? | | 7 | 0 |

== United States ==
The United States entered a squad of eleven players. They scored 15 goals but only three scorers are known.

Head coach: Neill Kohlhase (coach), Sam Greller (manager)

| No. | Pos. | Player | DoB | Age | Caps | Club | Tournament games | Tournament goals |
|---|---|---|---|---|---|---|---|---|
| | | Robert Frojen | 1 December 1930 | 25 | ? | (United States) Southern California Water Polo Club | 6 | ? |
| | | James Gaughran | 5 July 1932 | 24 | ? | (United States) Southern California Water Polo Club | 2 | ? |
| | | Donald Good | | | ? | | 0 | 0 |
| | GK | Kenneth Hahn | 5 June 1928 | 28 | ? | (United States) Illinois Athletic Club | 1 | ? |
| | GK | Robert Horn | 1 November 1931 | 27 | ? | (United States) Southern California Water Polo Club | 5 | ? |
| | | Robert Hughes | 15 December 1930 | 25 | ? | (United States) University of Southern California | 5 | ? |
| | | William Kooistra | 26 August 1926 | 30 | ? | (United States) Illinois Athletic Club | 5 | 1 |
| | | Sam Kooistra | 18 August 1935 | 21 | ? | (United States) Northwestern University | 4 | 1 |
| | | William Ross | 6 July 1928 | 28 | ? | (United States) Southern California Water Polo Club | 6 | 1 |
| | | Ronald Severa | 13 August 1936 | 20 | ? | (United States) Lynwood Swim Club | 3 | ? |
| | | Wally Wolf | 2 October 1930 | 26 | ? | (United States) Lynwood Swim Club | 5 | ? |

== United Team of Germany ==
Germany entered a squad of eleven players. They scored 16 goals but all scorers are unknown.

Head coach:

| No. | Pos. | Player | DoB | Age | Caps | Club | Tournament games | Tournament goals |
|---|---|---|---|---|---|---|---|---|
| | GK | Emil Bildstein | 17 May 1931 | 25 | ? | | 5 | 0 |
| | | Wilfried Bode | 13 December 1929 | 26 | ? | (Germany) Wasserfreunde Hannover | 6 | ? |
| | | Hans-Günther Hilker | 1932 | | ? | (Germany) Duisburg 98 | 3 | ? |
| | GK | Karl Neuse | 31 December 1930 | 25 | ? | | 1 | 0 |
| | | Alfred Obschernikat | 14 May 1926 | 30 | ? | (Germany) Duisburg 98 | 6 | ? |
| | | Friedhelm Osselmann | 9 April 1934 | 22 | ? | (Germany) Amateur SC Duisburg | 5 | ? |
| | | Erich Pennekamp | 13 November 1929 | 27 | ? | (Germany) Duisburg 98 | 1 | ? |
| | | Rudi Pennekamp | | | ? | (Germany) Duisburg 98 | 0 | 0 |
| | | Achim Schneider | 31 July 1934 | 22 | ? | (Germany) Duisburg 98 | 6 | ? |
| | | Hans-Werner Seher | 28 April 1929 | 27 | ? | | 3 | ? |
| | | Willi Sturm | 28 January 1928 | 28 | ? | | 6 | ? |

== Yugoslavia ==
Yugoslavia entered a squad of eleven players. They scored 25 goals but all scorers are unknown.

Head coach: File Bonačić

| No. | Pos. | Player | DoB | Age | Caps | Club | Tournament games | Tournament goals |
|---|---|---|---|---|---|---|---|---|
| | | Juraj Amšel | 1924 | | ? | (Socialist Federal Republic of Yugoslavia) HAVK Mladost | 0 | 0 |
| | | Ivo Cipci | 25 April 1933 | 23 | ? | (Socialist Federal Republic of Yugoslavia) Jadran Split | 7 | ? |
| | | Tomislav Franjković | 19 May 1931 | 25 | ? | (Socialist Federal Republic of Yugoslavia) Mornar Split | 6 | ? |
| | | Vladimir Ivković | 25 July 1929 | 27 | ? | (Socialist Federal Republic of Yugoslavia) VK Jug Dubrovnik | 2 | 0 |
| | | Zdravko Ježić | 17 August 1931 | 25 | ? | (Socialist Federal Republic of Yugoslavia) HAVK Mladost | 7 | ? |
| | | Hrvoje Kačić | 12 January 1932 | 24 | ? | (Socialist Federal Republic of Yugoslavia) VK Jug Dubrovnik | 7 | ? |
| | GK | Zdravko-Ćiro Kovačić | 6 July 1925 | 31 | ? | (Socialist Federal Republic of Yugoslavia) Primorj Rijeka | 7 | ? |
| | | Lovro Radonjić | 26 November 1925 | 31 | ? | (Socialist Federal Republic of Yugoslavia) Mornar Split | 6 | ? |
| | | Ivo Štakula | 25 February 1923 | 33 | ? | (Socialist Federal Republic of Yugoslavia) Mornar Split | 0 | 0 |
| | | Boško Vuksanović | 4 January 1928 | 28 | ? | (Socialist Federal Republic of Yugoslavia) VK Crvena zvezda | 0 | 0 |
| | | Marijan Žužej | 8 November 1934 | 22 | ? | (Socialist Federal Republic of Yugoslavia) HAVK Mladost | 7 | ? |
