= Voges =

Voges is a surname. Notable people with the surname include:

- Adam Voges (born 1979), Australian cricketer and coach
- Carol Voges (1925–2001), Dutch illustrator and cartoonist
- Danie Voges (born 1954), South African professional wrestler
- Gerrit Voges (1932–2007), Dutch footballer
- Mathias Voges (born 1943), Dutch politician and historian
- Mitch Voges (born 1949), American amateur golfer
- Torsten Voges (born 1961), German actor
- Wally Voges (born 1936), South African water polo player
