= Nahon =

Nahon is a surname. Notable people with the surname include:

- Alice Nahon (1896–1933), Belgian poet
- Cecilia Nahón (born 1974), Argentine economist, diplomat, and politician
- Chris Nahon (born 1968), French film director
- Emily Nahon (born 2007), Dutch-Indonesian association football player
- Karine Nahon (born 1972), Israeli information scientist
- Leon Nahon (born 1938), South African water polo player
- Marlene Hassan-Nahon (born 1976), Gibraltarian politician
- Philippe Nahon (1938–2020), French actor
