= Avellone =

Avellone is an Italian surname. Notable people with the surname include:

- Chris Avellone, American video game designer and comic book writer
- Giuseppe Avellone (born 1943), Italian Olympic swimmer
- Joseph Avellone (born 1948), American medical doctor, businessman, and politician
