= Azmi Isma'il =

Egyptian water polo player (1921-1984)

Personal information
- Nationality: Egyptian
- Born: 1921 Cairo, Egypt
- Died: 31 August 1984 (aged 62–63)

Sport
- Sport: Water polo

Azmi Isma'il (1921 – 31 August 1984) was an Egyptian water polo player. He competed in the men's tournament at the 1960 Summer Olympics.

== See also ==
- Egypt men's Olympic water polo team records and statistics
- List of men's Olympic water polo tournament goalkeepers
