= Jorge Cruz (water polo) =

Brazilian water polo player (1926–2003)

Personal information
- Full name: Jorge Everardo Luiz Alvares da Cruz Filho
- Born: 31 May 1926; Guanabara, Brazil
- Died: 23 May 2003 (aged 76); Rio de Janeiro, Brazil

Sport
- Sport: Water polo

Jorge Everardo Luiz Alvares da Cruz Filho (31 May 1926 – 23 May 2003) was a Brazilian water polo player. He competed in the men's tournament at the 1960 Summer Olympics.

Cruz died in Rio de Janeiro on 23 May 2003, at the age of 76.
