= Charles Lambert (water polo) =

French water polo player (1932–1990)

Personal information
- Nationality: French
- Born: 5 March 1932; Strasbourg, France
- Died: 5 June 1990 (aged 58); Strasbourg, France

Sport
- Sport: Water polo

Charles Lambert (5 March 1932 – 5 June 1990) was a French water polo player. He competed in the men's tournament at the 1960 Summer Olympics.
