= Boško Vuksanović =

Montenegrin water polo player

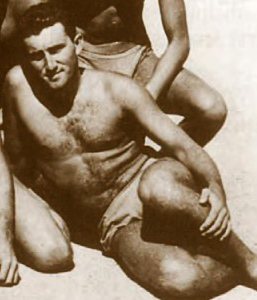
- Boško Vuksanović in the 1950s

Personal information
- Native name: Бошко Вуксановић
- Full name: Boško Vuksanović
- Nationality: Montenegrin
- Born: 4 January 1928 (age 98) Kotor, Kingdom of Serbs, Croats and Slovenes
- Died: 4 April 2011 (aged 83) Belgrade, Serbia

Sport
- Sport: Water polo
Medal record
Men's water polo
Representing Yugoslavia
Olympic Games
Silver medal – second place	1952 Helsinki	Team competition
European Championships
Silver medal – second place	1954 Turin	Team competition
Bronze medal – third place	1950 Wien	Team competition

Boško Vuksanović (Serbian Cyrillic: Бошко Вуксановић; 4 January 1928 – 4 April 2011) was a Montenegrin water polo player. Born in Kotor in what was then the Kingdom of Serbs, Croats and Slovenes, he would eventually compete for the Yugoslavia men's national water polo team. While part of the team, they would win a silver medal at the 1950 European Water Polo Championship and eventually competed at the 1952 Summer Olympics. There, they would win the silver medal, placing behind Hungary.

After the 1952 Summer Games, Vuksanović won a silver medal at the 1954 European Water Polo Championship. He was also included for the Yugoslav roster for the 1956 Summer Olympics but did not start in the event. He eventually coached the team at the 1968 Summer Olympics, where the team placed tenth.

== Biography ==
Boško Vuksanović was born on 4 January 1928 in Kotor in what was then the Kingdom of Serbs, Croats and Slovenes (now Montenegro). Vuksanović would compete at the 1952 Summer Olympics in Helsinki, Finland, representing Yugoslavia as part of the Yugoslavia men's national water polo team in the men's water polo tournament.

From 25 July to 2 August, they would compete together as a team in the competition. They would defeat Australia with a score of 10–2 in their first elimination round and would advance to the group stages of the event. They would then defeat Argentina 9–1, the Netherlands 1–2, and Sweden 9–1, placing first in the group and advanced to the semifinals. There, they would draw with the Soviet Union 3–3 and Hungary 2–2. They had to do a replay match with the Netherlands and defeated them 2–1, advancing to the finals. There, they would defeat the United States 4–2 and Italy 3–1, but would place second as Hungary had more goals with other teams than the Yugoslavian team had with their opponents.

Vuksanović was a squad member of the Yugoslav Olympic team in the 1956 tournament but did not play in a match. He eventually coached the Yugoslav team for the 1968 Summer Olympics; the team placed tenth.

Outside of the Olympic Games, he would win a silver and a bronze at the 1954 and 1950 European Water Polo Championship, respectively. He later died on 4 April 2011 in Belgrade, Serbia.

== See also ==
- List of Olympic medalists in water polo (men)
