= Brad (Crișul Alb) =

- Location within Romania

Location
- Country: Romania
- Counties: Hunedoara County
- Villages: Potingani, Valea Bradului, Brad

Physical characteristics
- Source: Bihor Mountains
- Mouth: Crișul Alb
  - location: Brad
  - coordinates: 46.1347°N 22.7883°E
- Length: 12 km (7.5 mi)
- Basin size: 28 km^{2} (11 sq mi)

Basin features
- Progression: Crișul Alb→ Körös→ Tisza→ Danube→ Black Sea

The Brad is a right tributary of the river Crișul Alb in Romania. It discharges into the Crișul Alb in the city Brad. Its length is 12 km (7.5 mi) and its basin size is 28 km^{2} (11 sq mi).
