= Allan Brown (water polo) =

South African water polo player

Personal information
- Nationality: South African
- Born: 24 January 1937 (age 88); Pretoria, South Africa

Sport
- Sport: Water polo

Allan Brown (born 24 January 1937) is a South African water polo player. He competed in the men's tournament at the 1960 Summer Olympics.
