= Ahmed Fouad Nessim =

Egyptian water polo player (1924–1956)

Personal information
- Nationality: Egyptian
- Born: 19 September 1924
- Died: 28 October 1956 (aged 32) Mediterranean Sea

Sport
- Sport: Water polo

Ahmed Fouad Nessim (19 September 1924 – 28 October 1956) was an Egyptian water polo player. He participated in the 1948 Summer Olympics and the 1952 Summer Olympics.

He was given the honour of carrying the national flag of Egypt at the opening ceremony of the 1952 Summer Olympics in Helsinki, becoming the seventh water polo player to serve as a flag bearer at the opening and closing ceremonies of the Olympics. Nessim died after the plane he was travelling on was shot down during Operation Tarnegol over the Mediterranean Sea.

== See also ==
- Egypt men's Olympic water polo team records and statistics
- List of men's Olympic water polo tournament goalkeepers
