= René Daubinet =

French water polo player (born 1933)

Personal information
- Nationality: French
- Born: 7 January 1933 (age 92); Strasbourg, France

Sport
- Sport: Water polo

René Daubinet (born 7 January 1933) is a French water polo player. He competed in the men's tournament at the 1960 Summer Olympics.
