= Pedro Consuegra =

Argentine water polo player (1930–2000)

Personal information
- Born: 24 August 1930; Santa Fe, Argentina
- Died: 18 December 2000 (aged 70)

Sport
- Sport: Water polo

Pedro Consuegra (24 August 1930 – 18 December 2000) was an Argentine water polo player. He competed in the men's tournament at the 1960 Summer Olympics.
