= Brad railway station =

Railway station in Brad, Romania

Coordinates: 46°08′12″N 22°46′55″E

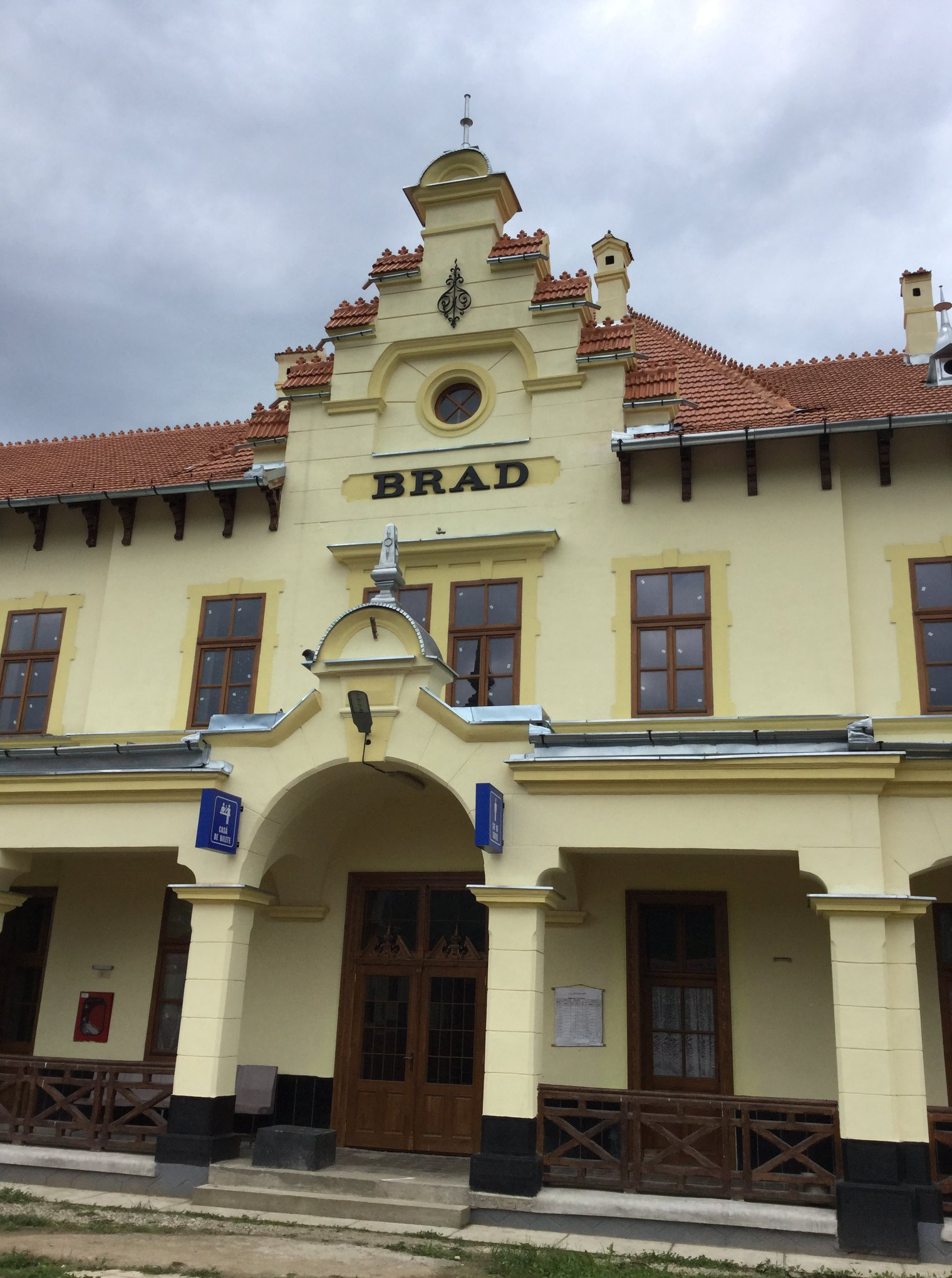
Brad railway station

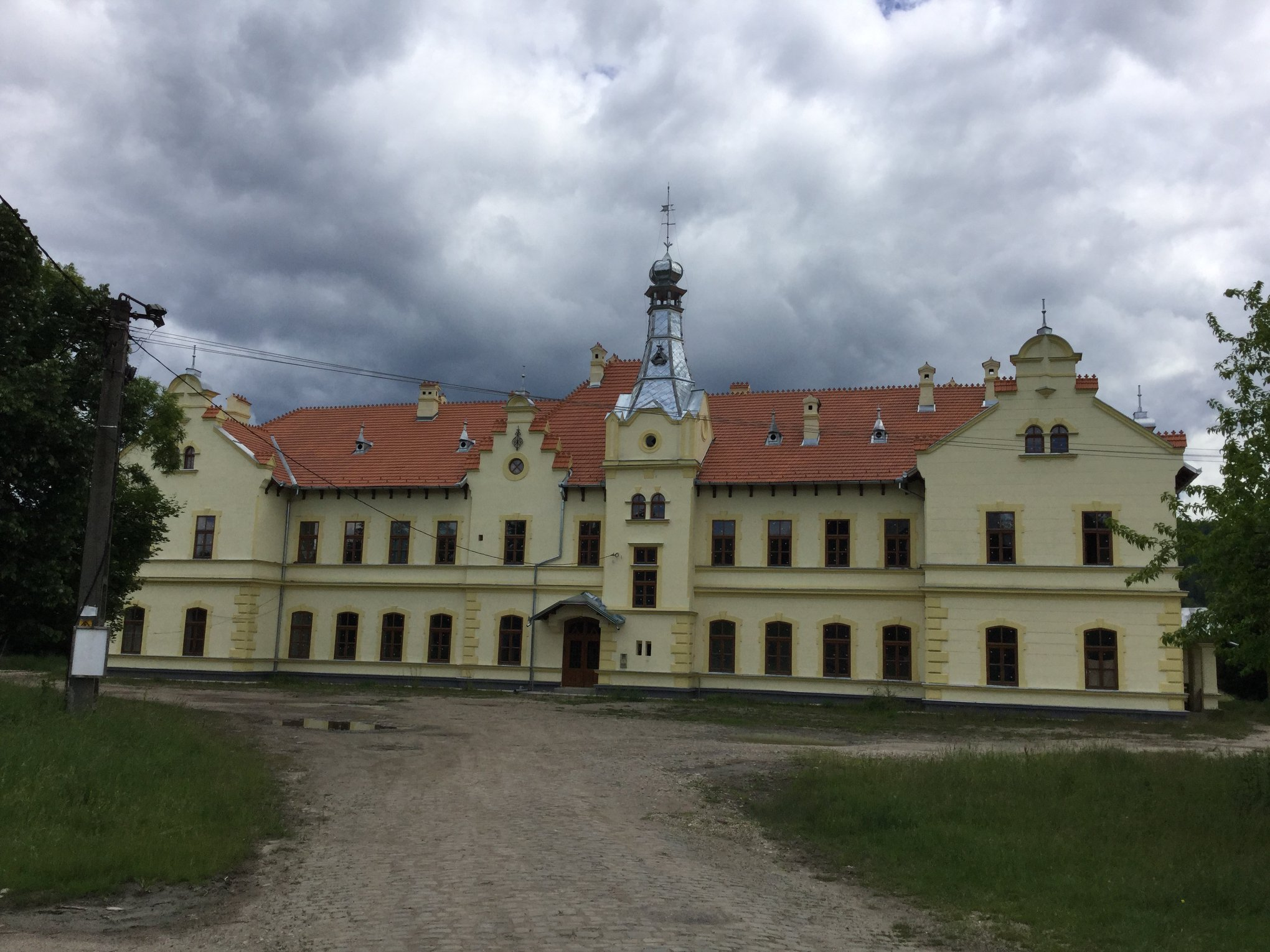
Another view of the station

The Brad railway station is a railway station located in Brad, Romania.

The station was inaugurated on December 6, 1896, at the end of a line that began in Sântana. It went into decline after the Romanian Revolution, with the line to Deva being torn up. Eventually, the building entered a state of advanced degradation. It underwent a thorough renovation of the exterior in 2016–2019, but the interior remains dilapidated.

The railway station serves the Regio Călători line joining Brad to Ineu and Arad. For about 20 years it served the Căile Ferate Române Line 209, which connected Brad to Deva, the capital of Hunedoara County. Construction of the rail line started in April 1939. During World War II, Jews and Soviet prisoners of war worked on the project; up to 1,000 are said to have died due to the harsh conditions there. The project was restarted in 1960, with a 301 m (988 ft) rail bridge over the river Mureș, and was completed in the mid-1980s.

The station is listed as a historic monument by Romania's Ministry of Culture and Religious Affairs.
