= André Lochon =

French water polo player (1932–2014)

Personal information
- Nationality: French
- Born: 19 December 1932; Reims, France
- Died: 3 June 2014 (aged 81)

Sport
- Sport: Water polo

André Lochon (19 December 1932 – 3 June 2014) was a French water polo player. He competed in the men's tournament at the 1960 Summer Olympics.
