= Frank Butler (water polo) =

South African water polo player

Personal information
- Nationality: South African
- Born: 4 July 1932; Johannesburg, South Africa
- Died: 30 June 2015 (aged 82)

Sport
- Sport: Water polo

Frank Butler (4 July 1932 – 30 June 2015) was a South African water polo player. He competed in the men's tournament at the 1960 Summer Olympics.
