= Gavril Blajek =

Romanian water polo player

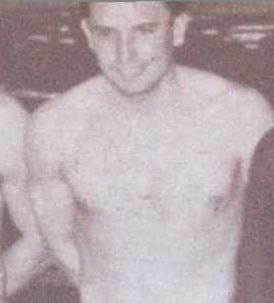
- Gavril Blajek 1965

Personal information
- Nationality: Romanian
- Born: 23 July 1939 (age 86); Brad, Romania

Sport
- Sport: Water polo

Gavril Blajek (born 23 July 1939) is a Romanian water polo player. He competed in the men's tournament at the 1960 Summer Olympics.
