= Graeme Sherman =

Australian water polo player

Personal information
- Nationality: Australian
- Born: 25 December 1937 (age 87); Victoria, Australia

Sport
- Sport: Water polo

Graeme Sherman (born 25 December 1937) is an Australian water polo player. He competed in the men's tournament at the 1960 Summer Olympics.
