= Dieter Seiz =

German water polo player

Personal information
- Nationality: German
- Born: 20 March 1938 (age 87); Kornwestheim, Germany

Sport
- Sport: Water polo

Dieter Seiz (born 20 March 1938) is a German water polo player. He competed in the men's tournament at the 1960 Summer Olympics.
