= Alfredo Carnovali =

Argentine water polo player (1937–2026)

Personal information
- Born: 21 June 1937 Buenos Aires, Argentina
- Died: 5 March 2026 (aged 88)

Sport
- Sport: Water polo

Alfredo Carnovali (21 June 1937 – 5 March 2026) was an Argentine water polo player. He competed in the men's tournament at the 1960 Summer Olympics.
