= Wescot-Williams cabinet =

Wescot-Williams cabinet may refer to:

- First Wescot-Williams cabinet, the cabinet of Sint Maarten under Prime Minister Sarah Wescot-Williams, 2010–2012
- Second Wescot-Williams cabinet, the cabinet of Sint Maarten under Prime Minister Sarah Wescot-Williams, 2012–2013
- Third Wescot-Williams cabinet, the cabinet of Sint Maarten under Prime Minister Sarah Wescot-Williams, 2013–2014
