= Mohamed Khalil =

Egyptian water polo player (born 1939)

Personal information
- Nationality: Egyptian
- Born: 5 March 1939 (age 87)

Sport
- Sport: Water polo

Mohamed Khalil (born 5 March 1939) is an Egyptian water polo player. He competed in the men's tournament at the 1964 Summer Olympics.

== See also ==
- Egypt men's Olympic water polo team records and statistics
- List of men's Olympic water polo tournament goalkeepers
