= Rolando da Cruz =

Brazilian water polo player (1930–1987)

Personal information
- Full name: Rolando Luiz Alvares da Cruz
- Born: 5 July 1930; Rio de Janeiro, Brazil
- Died: 26 May 1987 (aged 56); Rio de Janeiro, Brazil

Sport
- Sport: Water polo

Rolando Luiz Alvares da Cruz (5 July 1930 – 26 May 1987) was a Brazilian water polo player. He competed in the men's tournament at the 1960 Summer Olympics. Cruz died in Rio de Janeiro on 26 May 1987, at the age of 56.
