= Diego Wolf =

Argentine water polo player (1934–2010)

Personal information
- Nationality: Argentine
- Born: 30 August 1934; Aurich, Germany
- Died: 23 December 2010 (aged 76)

Sport
- Sport: Water polo

Diego Wolf (30 August 1934 – 23 December 2010) was an Argentine water polo player. He competed in the men's tournament at the 1960 Summer Olympics.
