= Claude Greder =

French water polo player (1934–2005)

Personal information
- Nationality: French
- Born: 8 February 1934; Strasbourg, France
- Died: 9 April 2005 (aged 71); Strasbourg, France

Sport
- Sport: Water polo

Claude Greder (8 February 1934 – 9 April 2005) was a French water polo player. He competed in the men's tournament at the 1960 Summer Olympics.
