= Jean-Paul Weil =

French water polo player (born 1941)

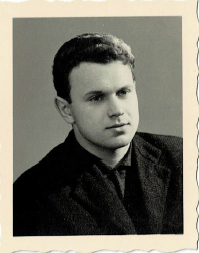
- Weil Jean-Paul en 1960

Personal information
- Full name: Jean-Paul Weil
- National team: (SNS) Société de Natation de Strasbourg
- Born: 18 July 1941 (age 85) Strasbourg, France
- Education: Brevet de maitrise en 1964 (électricité)
- Height: 175 cm (5 ft 9 in)
- Weight: 76 kg (168 lb; 12 st 0 lb)
- Spouse: Christiane Weil (1964-présent)
- Other interests: Natation

Sport
- Country: France (Water-Polo)
- Sport: Water polo
- Event: Nage Libre
- Club: SNS (Société de Natation de Strasbourg)
- Coached by: Charles Hirt, (1953-1959) | Moellé (1959-1967)
- Retired: 2001

Achievements and titles
- Regional finals: Infranational | Alsace | Bas-rhin, Haut-Rhin
- National finals: France

Jean-Paul Weil (born 18 July 1941) is a French water polo player. He competed in the men's tournament at the 1960 Summer Olympics.
