= Fred van der Zwan =

Dutch water polo player (1935–2018)

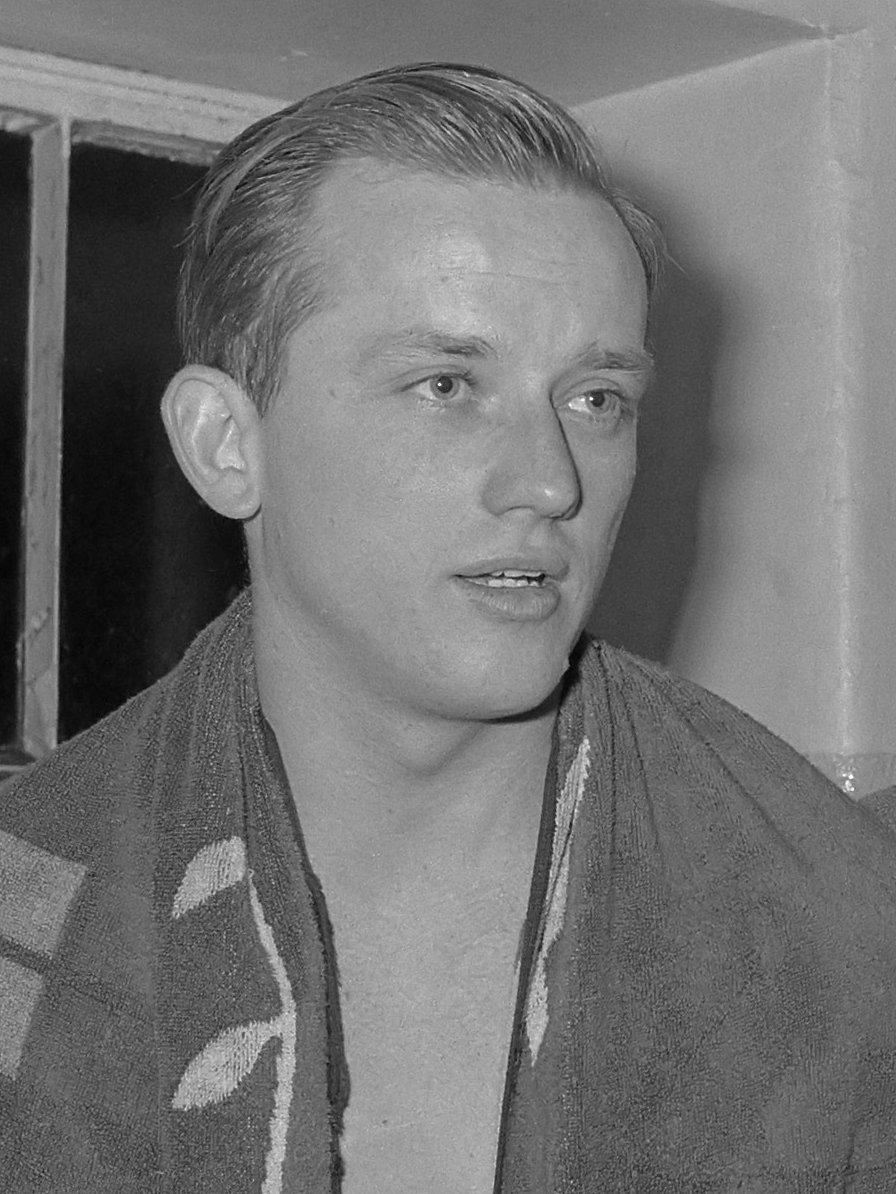
- Fred van der Zwan in 1964

Personal information
- Nationality: Dutch
- Born: 16 October 1935; Willemstad, Curaçao
- Died: 12 July 2018 (aged 82); Delft, Netherlands

Sport
- Sport: Water polo

Fred van der Zwan (16 October 1935 – 12 July 2018) was a Dutch water polo player. He competed in the men's tournament at the 1960 Summer Olympics.
