= Roberto Fischer =

Argentine water polo player (born 1936)

Personal information
- Born: 1 June 1936 (age 88); Buenos Aires, Argentina

Sport
- Sport: Water polo

Roberto Fischer (born 1 June 1936) is an Argentine water polo player. He competed in the men's tournament at the 1960 Summer Olympics.
