= Jacques Meslier =

French water polo player (1928–2014)

Personal information
- Nationality: French
- Born: 3 May 1928; Saigon, French Indochina
- Died: 25 January 2014 (aged 85)

Sport
- Sport: Water polo

Jacques Meslier (3 May 1928 – 25 January 2014) was a French water polo player. He competed in the men's tournament at the 1960 Summer Olympics.
