= Ronald Tinkler =

South African water polo player

Personal information
- Nationality: South African
- Born: 4 May 1934 (age 90); Johannesburg, South Africa

Sport
- Sport: Water polo

Ronald Tinkler (born 4 May 1934) is a South African water polo player. He competed in the men's tournament at the 1960 Summer Olympics.
