= Roger Neubauer =

French water polo player (1938–2023)

Personal information
- Nationality: French
- Born: 8 May 1938; Strasbourg, France
- Died: 9 October 2023 (aged 85); Strasbourg, France

Sport
- Sport: Water polo

Roger Neubauer (8 May 1938 – 9 October 2023) was a French water polo player. He competed in the men's tournament at the 1960 Summer Olympics. Neubauer died on 9 October 2023, at the age of 85.
