= Henry Samson (water polo) =

Brazilian water polo player

Personal information
- Born: 26 November 1927; Rio de Janeiro, Brazil
- Died: 14 February 2011 (aged 83)

Sport
- Sport: Water polo

Henry Samson (26 November 1927 – 14 February 2011) was a Brazilian water polo player. He competed in the men's tournament at the 1960 Summer Olympics.
