= Des Clark (water polo) =

Australian water polo player

Personal information
- Nationality: Australian
- Born: 24 November 1941 (age 83); Glanville, South Australia

Sport
- Sport: Water polo

Des Clark (born 24 November 1941) is an Australian water polo player. He competed in the men's tournament at the 1960 Summer Olympics.
