= Mohamed Abid Soliman =

Egyptian water polo player (born 1945)

Mohamed Amin Soliman
Personal information
- Nationality: Egyptian
- Born: 20 August 1945 (age 80) Cairo, Egypt

Sport
- Sport: Water polo

Mohamed Amin Soliman (born 20 August 1945) is an Egyptian water polo player. He competed at the 1964 Summer Olympics and the 1968 Summer Olympics.

== See also ==
- Egypt men's Olympic water polo team records and statistics
- List of men's Olympic water polo tournament goalkeepers
