= Gamal El-Nazer =

Egyptian water polo player (1930–2006)

Personal information
- Nationality: Egyptian
- Born: 22 January 1930; Aswan, Egypt
- Died: 5 September 2006 (aged 76); 6th of October, Egypt

Sport
- Sport: Water polo

Gamal El-Nazer (22 January 1930 – 5 September 2006) was an Egyptian water polo player. He competed in the men's tournament at the 1960 Summer Olympics in Rome.

== See also ==
- Egypt men's Olympic water polo team records and statistics
- List of men's Olympic water polo tournament goalkeepers
