= Ivo Štakula =

Croatian water polo player (1923–1958)

Personal information
- Born: 25 February 1923 Dubrovnik, Kingdom of Serbs, Croats, and Slovenes
- Died: 26 October 1958 (aged 35) Melbourne, Australia

Sport
- Sport: Water polo
Medal record
Representing Yugoslavia
Water Polo
Silver medal – second place	1952 Helsinki	Team competition

Ivo Štakula (25 February 1923 – 26 October 1958) was a Croatian water polo player who represented Croatia and Yugoslavia nationally and was a long-time player for VK Jug Dubrovnik.

He died in Melbourne.

Štakula played with the Yugoslavian national team from 1946 to 1956. He participated in the 1948, 1952 and 1956 Olympics. He defected to Australia after the 1956 Summer Olympics in Melbourne.

Štakula won silver with the team at the 1952 Olympics. Four years later he was a squad member of the Yugoslav Olympic team in the 1956 tournament but did not play in a match.

He also played for the Croatian national water polo team during World War II.

== See also ==
- List of Olympic medalists in water polo (men)
