= Brad, Hunedoara =

Brad
- Municipality
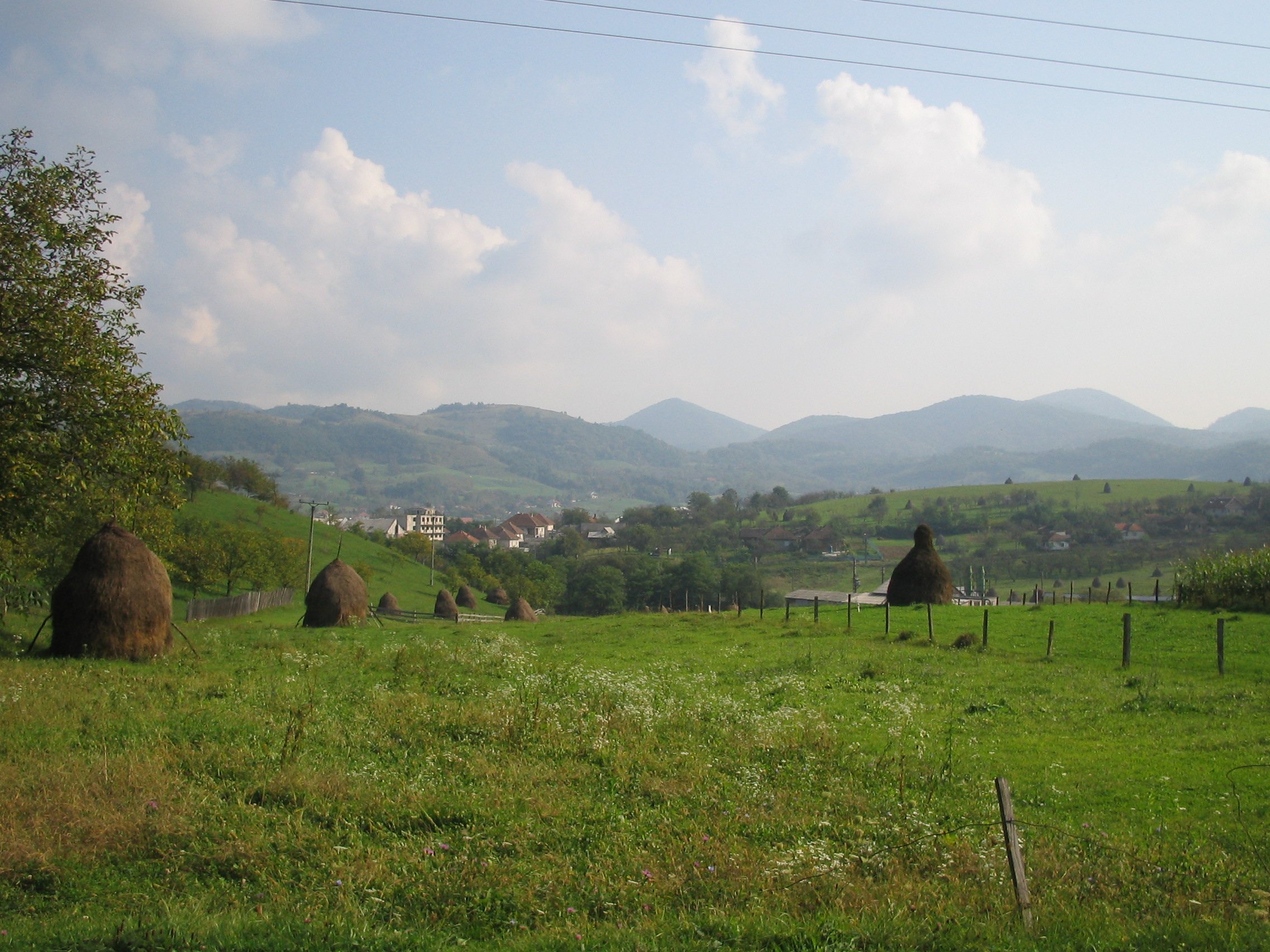
- Brad skyline

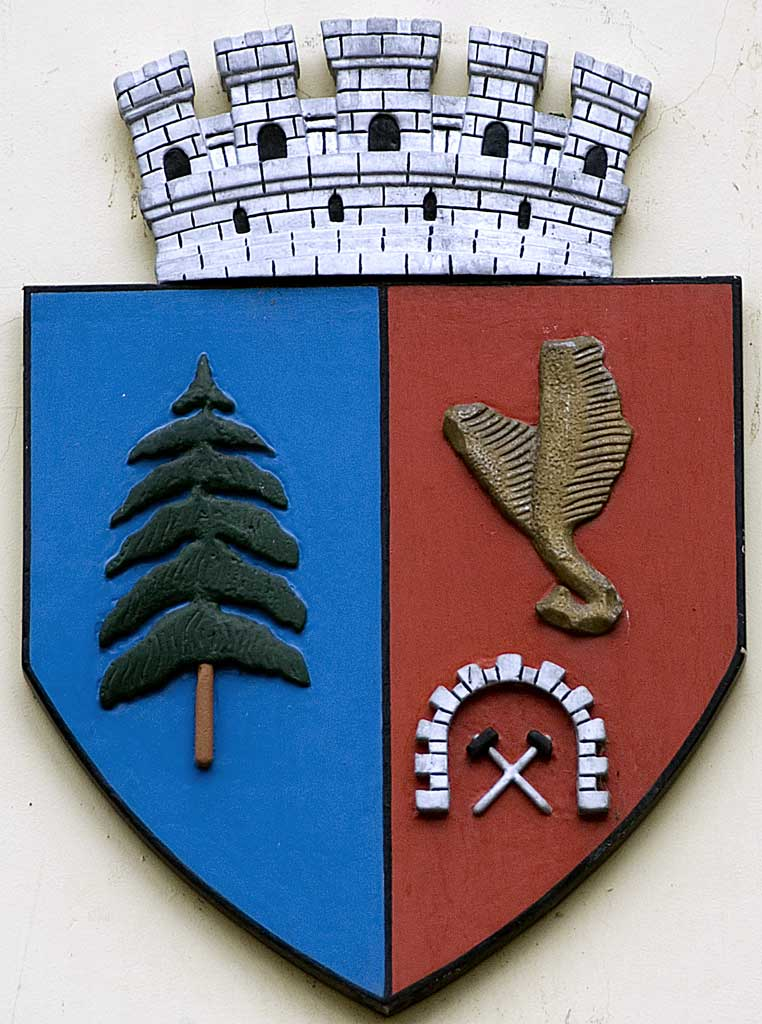
- Coat of arms

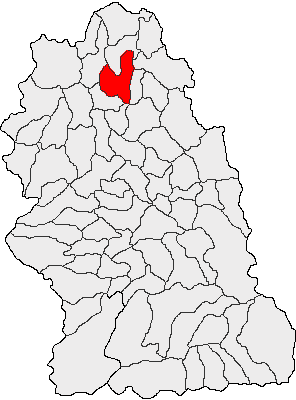
- Location in Hunedoara County

- Location in Romania
- Coordinates: 46°7′46″N 22°47′24″E
- Country: Romania
- County: Hunedoara

Government
  - Mayor (2024–2028): Florin Cazacu (PSD)
- Area: 79.98 km^{2} (30.88 sq mi)
- Elevation: 278 m (912 ft)
- Population (2021-12-01): 12,690
  - Density: 158.7/km^{2} (410.9/sq mi)
- Time zone: UTC+02:00 (EET)
  - Summer (DST): UTC+03:00 (EEST)
- Postal code: 335200
- Area code: (+40) 02 54
- Vehicle reg.: HD
- Website: primariabrad.ro

Brad (Romanian pronunciation: [brad]; Hungarian: Brád; German: Tannenhof) is a city in Hunedoara County in the Transylvania region of Romania. Its name comes from the Romanian word brad, "fir".

== Geography ==
The city is located in the northern part of the county, at the foot of the Metaliferi Mountains. It lies in the valleys of the river Crișul Alb and its tributaries, Brad and Luncoiu. Five villages are administered by the city: Mesteacăn ("birch"; Mesztákon), Potingani (Pottingány), Ruda-Brad (Ruda), Țărățel (Cerecel) and Valea Bradului ("the valley of the fir tree"; Vályabrád).

== History ==
A gold mine in the area began to be exploited in Roman times, and the town developed around it. The earliest documentary mention of Brad dates to 1445. Gold mining was active until 2006. There is a Gold Museum.

== Buildings and monuments ==
The Brad railway station is listed as a historic monument. The central plaza of Brad features a copy of the Capitoline Wolf, near the Dacian Draco.

== Demographics ==
Historical population
Year	Pop.	±%
1948	6,210	—
1956	9,963	+60.4%
1966	15,532	+55.9%
1977	17,077	+9.9%
1992	18,861	+10.4%
2002	16,482	−12.6%
2011	14,495	−12.1%
2021	12,690	−12.5%
Source: Census data

At the 2021 census, Brad had a population of 12,690. At the census from 2011, the population of the city was 14,495, of which 13,534 (97.3%) were Romanians, 192 (1.38%) Romani, 127 (0.91%) Hungarians, 19 (0.13%) Germans, and 33 others.

== Natives ==
- Cătălin Bălescu (born 1962), visual artist and academic
- Gavril Blajek (born 1939), water polo player
- Gheorghe Falcă (born 1967), politician and engineer
- Ilarion Felea (1903–1961), priest and theologian of the Romanian Orthodox Church
- Florin Maxim (born 1981), footballer and manager
- Teodor Meleșcanu (born 1941), politician, diplomat, and jurist
- László Pataky (1857–1912), painter
- Ileana Stana-Ionescu (1936-2024), actress and politician
