= Keith Wiegard =

Australian sportsman

Personal information
- Full name: Keith Wiegard
- Born: 7 January 1938; Melbourne, Victoria
- Died: 17 December 1992 (aged 54)
- Original team: Kew YCW
- Height: 178 cm (5 ft 10 in)
- Weight: 76 kg (168 lb)

Playing career^{1}
Years	Club	Games (Goals)
1957–59, 1961	Fitzroy	32 (13)
- ^{1} Playing statistics correct to the end of 1961.

Keith Wiegard (7 January 1938 – 17 December 1992) was an Australian rules footballer and Olympian. He played with Fitzroy in the Victorian Football League (VFL) and represented Australia in Water polo at the 1960 Summer Olympics.

Wiegard made his VFL debut as a 19-year-old in the final round of the 1957 season. The following year he played in all 18 home and away games as well as Fitzroy's Semi Final loss to North Melbourne. In June 1959 he was a passenger in car that crashed, killing a female passenger. He injured his left knee in the crash and was unable to play football.

In 1960 he concentrated on water polo and represented his country at the Rome Olympics. He scored all three of Australia's goals against the Netherlands and also appeared against Yugoslovia, but they lost both encounters and didn't advance past the group stages. Another former Fitzroy player, Lawrence Morgan, won two gold medals at the same Olympics.

After returning to Fitzroy in 1961, Wiegard could only add three more games to his tally and retired from the VFL. He was however later the club's president from 1981 to 1984.

Wiegard's brother, Leon, was also a water polo player and dual Olympian for Australia, at the 1964 and 1972 games. Like his sibling he also served as president of the Fitzroy Football Club.
