= Jorge Lucey =

Argentine water polo player (1932–2012)

Personal information
- Born: 16 March 1932; Buenos Aires, Argentina
- Died: 15 May 2012 (aged 80)

Sport
- Sport: Water polo

Jorge Lucey (16 March 1932 – 15 May 2012) was an Argentine water polo player. He competed in the men's tournament at the 1960 Summer Olympics.
