= László Pataky =

Hungarian painter

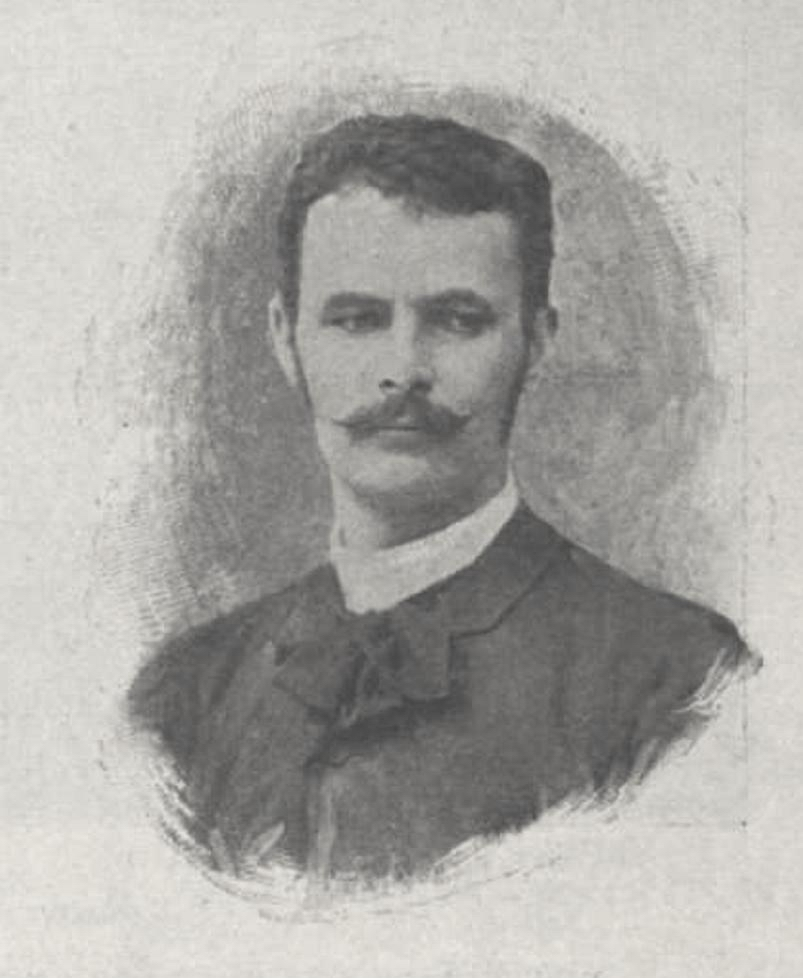
László Pataky (1898)

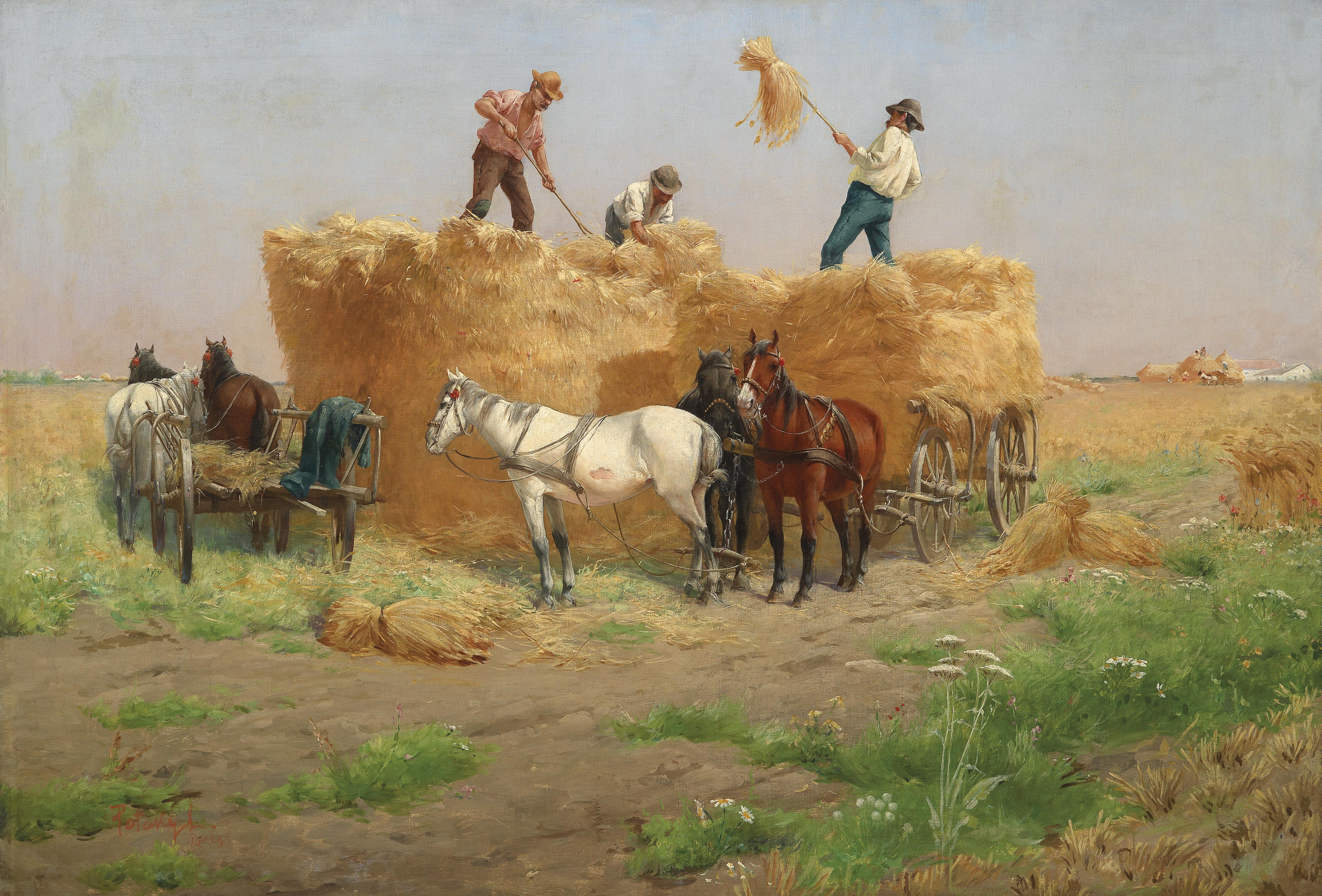
The Hay Crop

László Pataky (24 December 1857, Brád - 4 March 1912, Alvinc) was a painter from Austria-Hungary who specialized in rural genre scenes.

== Life and work ==
He initially studied at the arts and crafts school in Budapest then after 1880, at the Academy of Fine Arts, Munich with Karl von Piloty as his primary instructor. He continued his education in Paris and, from 1883 to 1889, travelled between Paris, Budapest and Munich.

In 1888, he was awarded a scholarship for his painting "The Messenger", which enabled him to study with Mihály Munkácsy. In addition to working in his studio, he helped him create his monumental painting, "Hungarian Conquest", for the Hungarian Parliament Building. When that was completed, he returned to his home province and settled in Alvinc.

He provided illustrations for numerous novels, including Marriage Without Love by Carmen Sylva, Giovanni Episcopo by Gabriele D'Annunzio, and The Soul of the Baron by Géza Gárdonyi. He also created gouache illustrations for the Vasárnapi Ujság (Sunday News), the Új Idők (New Times) and Magyar Salon (an illustrated monthly magazine). Major retrospectives of his work were mounted in 1913, by the Guild of St.George, and 1918 by the Hall of Art. Many of his works are maintained in the collection of the Hungarian National Gallery.

== Sources ==
- Magyar életrajzi lexikon IV: 1978–1991 (A–Z). Ágnes Kenyeres (ed.). Budapest: Akadémiai. 1994. ISBN 963-05-6422-X
- Kieselbach Gallery
- Budapest Aukcio
- Basic data @ the Petőfi Literary Museum
