= Jürgen Honig =

German water polo player

Personal information
- Nationality: German
- Born: 16 April 1940 (age 85); Duisburg, Germany

Sport
- Sport: Water polo

Jürgen Honig (born 16 April 1940) is a German water polo player. He competed in the men's tournament at the 1960 Summer Olympics.
