= Ernesto Parga =

Argentine water polo player (1935–1990)

Personal information
- Born: 26 November 1935; Buenos Aires, Argentina
- Died: 5 October 1990 (aged 54)

Sport
- Sport: Water polo

Ernesto Parga (26 November 1935 – 5 October 1990) was an Argentine water polo player. He competed in the men's tournament at the 1960 Summer Olympics.
