= Stephanus Botha =

South African water polo player

Personal information
- Nationality: South African
- Born: 30 March 1931; Stellenbosch, South Africa
- Died: 2017 (aged 85–86)

Sport
- Sport: Water polo

Stephanus Botha (30 March 1931 – 2017) was a South African water polo player. He competed in the men's tournament at the 1960 Summer Olympics.
