= Hans Schepers =

German water polo player

Personal information
- Nationality: German
- Born: 26 March 1930 Hamm, Germany
- Died: 2 January 2012 (aged 81) Hamm, Germany

Sport
- Sport: Water polo

Hans Schepers (26 March 1930 – 2 January 2012) was a German swimmer and water polo player. In the 1960 Summer Olympics he captained the German water polo team in the men's tournament, finishing sixth. He also competed between 1963-65 in the German swimming championships as a freestyler. He competed for SC Rote Erde Hamm, winning a German championship with them. He coached Red Earth Hamm until 1972, stopping to focus on his career as an Optician.
