= Harry Lamme =

Dutch water polo player (1935–2019)

Personal information
- Nationality: Dutch
- Born: 8 October 1935; Naarden, Netherlands
- Died: 12 November 2019 (aged 84); Blaricum, Netherlands

Sport
- Sport: Water polo

Harry Lamme (8 October 1935 – 12 November 2019) was a Dutch water polo player. He competed in the men's tournament at the 1960 Summer Olympics.
