= Robert Schwartz (water polo) =

South African water polo player

Personal information
- Nationality: South African
- Born: 7 July 1939 (age 85); Johannesburg, South Africa

Sport
- Sport: Water polo

Robert Schwartz (born 7 July 1939) is a South African water polo player. He competed in the men's tournament at the 1960 Summer Olympics.
