= Moustafa Bakri =

Egyptian water polo player (born 1939)

Personal information
- Nationality: Egyptian
- Born: 1939 (age 85–86); Cairo, Egypt

Sport
- Sport: Water polo

Moustafa Bakri (born 1939) is an Egyptian water polo player. He competed in the men's tournament at the 1960 Summer Olympics.
