= Mathias Voges =

Mathias Sinclair Voges

Minister Plenipotentiary of Sint Maarten
- In office 20 October 2010 – 19 December 2014
- Prime Minister: Sarah Wescot-Williams
- Preceded by: none
- Succeeded by: Josianne Fleming-Artsen

Personal details
- Born: 23 February 1943 (age 83)
- Party: Democratic Party Sint Maarten

Mathias Sinclair Voges (Philipsburg, 23 February 1943) is a politician and historian from Sint Maarten, who held the office of Minister Plenipotentiary of Sint Maarten from 2010 till 2014. Before this, Voges had been Acting Lieutenant Governor of Sint Maarten. He is also a former president of the board of directors of the University of St. Martin.

== Biography ==
Voges was born in Philipsburg, Sint Maarten to Johannes Ricardo Voges and Theresa Winifred Lejuez. The family left for Curaçao when Mathias was still young. In Curaçao, he graduated from Peter Stuyvesant College in 1965, after which he continued his studies in Maastricht, the Netherlands at the Rijkskweekschool. After graduating in 1966, he moved to Aruba, where he did the Lerarenopleiding, from which he graduated in 1975.

Voges returned to Sint Maarten in 1981, becoming the principal of the MAVO department of the Milton Peters College. He was promoted to General Director in 1983, and served until 1987. He subsequently became superintendent of the Catholic schools in the Windward Islands.

Voges was installed as the first Minister Plenipotentiary of Sint Maarten by the first Wescot-Williams cabinet that took office on 10 October 2010. He retains his function in the second Wescot-Williams cabinet, although he is joined by Deputy Minister Plenipotentiary Henrietta Doran-York of the National Alliance, the leading party in the new cabinet.

== Awards and recognitions ==
- Officer in the Order of Orange-Nassau (1993)
