= Leri Gogoladze =

Soviet water polo player

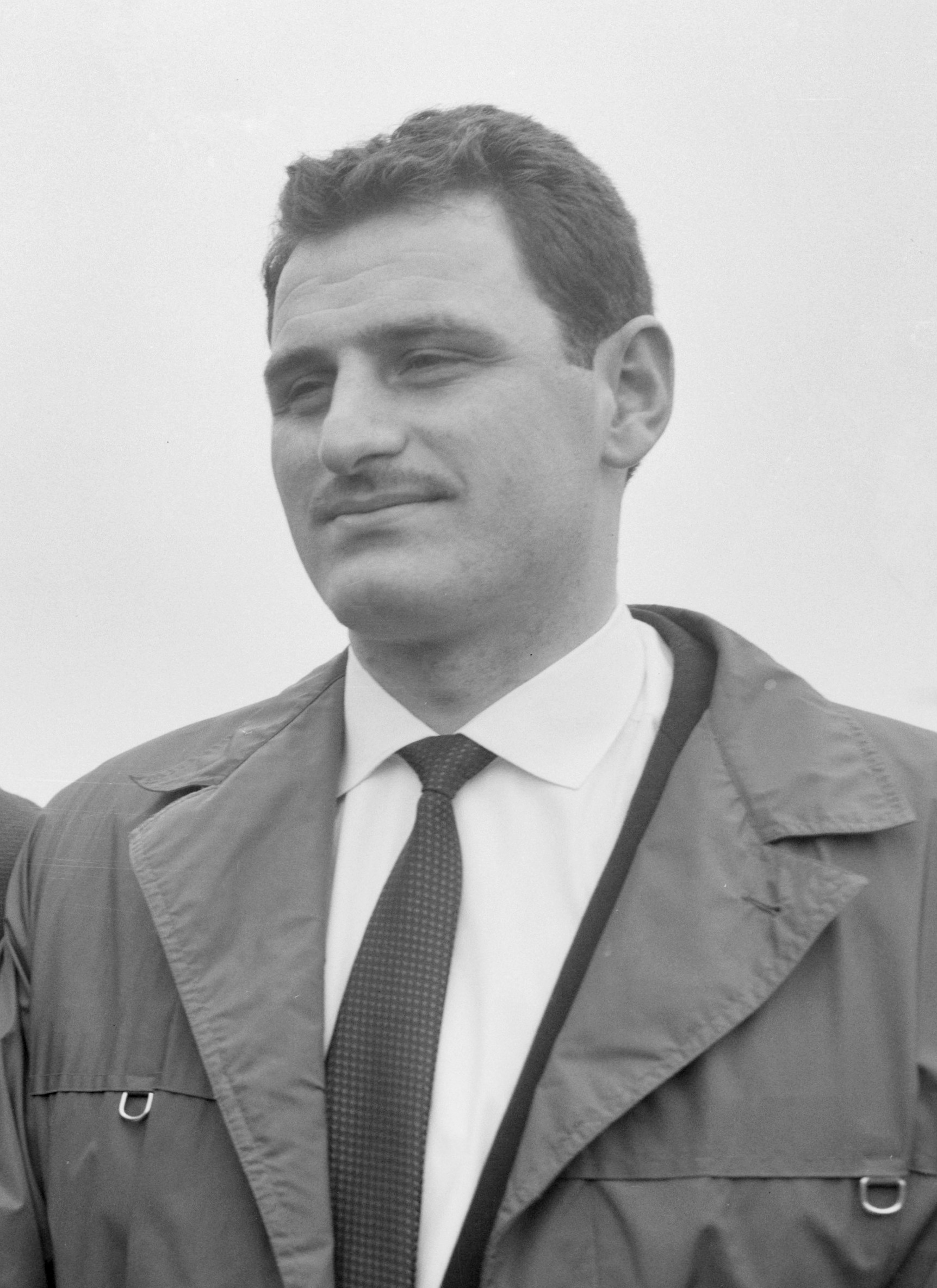
- Leri Gogoladze in 1962

Personal information
- Born: 1 April 1938 (age 88) Tbilisi, Georgian SSR, Soviet Union
- Height: 1.85 m (6 ft 1 in)
- Weight: 87 kg (192 lb)

Sport
- Sport: Water polo
- Club: Dynamo Tbilisi
Medal record
Representing the Soviet Union
Olympic Games
Silver medal – second place	1960 Rome	Team competition
European Championships
Silver medal – second place	1962 Leipzig	Team competition

Leri Gogoladze, also known as Larry Gogoladze, (Georgian: ლერი გოგოლაძე, born 1 April 1938) is a retired Georgian water polo goalkeeper who competed for the Soviet Union in the 1960 Summer Olympics; he played three matches and won a silver medal.

Around mid-1960s Gogoladze retired from sports to focus on his doctorate in mathematics. He later became a professor of mathematics and a vice-rector of the Tbilisi State University.

== See also ==
- Soviet Union men's Olympic water polo team records and statistics
- List of Olympic medalists in water polo (men)
- List of men's Olympic water polo tournament goalkeepers
