= Mohamed Abdel Hafiz =

Egyptian water polo player (born 1939)

Personal information
- Nationality: Egyptian
- Born: 1939; Cairo, Egypt

Sport
- Sport: Water polo

Mohamed Abdel Hafiz (born 1939) is an Egyptian water polo player. He competed in the 1960 Summer Olympics.
