= Jozef Smits =

Belgian water polo player (1930–2002)

Personal information
- Nationality: Belgian
- Born: 28 March 1930; Antwerp, Belgium
- Died: 15 January 2002 (aged 71); Wilrijk, Belgium

Sport
- Sport: Water polo

Jozef Smits (28 March 1930 – 15 January 2002) was a Belgian water polo player. He competed at the 1952 Summer Olympics and the 1960 Summer Olympics. Smits died in Wilrijk on 15 January 2002, at the age of 71.
