= Peter Pass =

British water polo player

Personal information
- Nationality: British
- Born: 8 March 1933; Finsbury, England
- Died: 3 June 2012 (aged 79)
- Children: Andrew Pass, Carol Pass, Sarah Pass

Sport
- Sport: Water polo

Peter Pass MBE (8 March 1933 – 3 June 2012) was a British water polo player. He competed in the men's tournament at the 1956 Summer Olympics. He was inducted into the Guinness Book of World Records in 1972 for the most career caps of any British water polo player—a total of 95—and received an MBE that same year.

In club water polo, he played for Polytechnic's first team for 21 seasons between 1949 and 1970, then was a coach. From 1964 to 1994, Polytechnic won 17 National Water Polo League titles.

In his later years, Pass lived in County Offaly, Ireland. He died in 2012 of bowel cancer.
