= Anatoly Kartashov (water polo) =

Soviet water polo player

Personal information
- Born: May 5, 1937 Moscow, Soviet Union
- Died: January 17, 2005 (aged 67) Moscow, Russia

Sport
- Sport: Water polo
Medal record
Representing Soviet Union
Olympic Games
Silver medal – second place	1960 Rome	Team competition

Anatoly Nikolaevich Kartashov (Russian: Анатолий Николаевич Карташов, May 5, 1937 – January 17, 2005) was a Russian water polo player who competed for the Soviet Union in the 1960 Summer Olympics.

He was born in Moscow.

In 1960 he was a member of the Soviet team which won the silver medal in the Olympic water polo tournament. He played all seven matches and scored five goals.

== See also ==
- List of Olympic medalists in water polo (men)
