= Massimo Rosi =

Italian swimmer

Personal information
- Born: 11 February 1944 Pisa, Italy
- Died: 28 December 1995 (aged 51)

Sport
- Sport: Swimming

Massimo Rosi (11 February 1944 – 28 December 1995) was an Italian swimmer. He competed in two events at the 1960 Summer Olympics.
