= Vladimir Novikov (water polo) =

Soviet water polo player

Personal information
- Born: 25 June 1937 Moscow, Russian SFSR, Soviet Union
- Died: 1980 (aged approximately 43)
- Height: 1.73 m (5 ft 8 in)
- Weight: 78 kg (172 lb)

Sport
- Sport: Water polo
- Club: Dynamo Moscow
Medal record
Representing the Soviet Union
Olympic Games
Silver medal – second place	1960 Rome	Team competition

Vladimir Dmitriyevich Novikov (Russian: Владимир Дмитриевич Новиков; 25 June 1937 – 1980) was a Russian water polo player. He won a silver medal with the Soviet team at the 1960 Summer Olympics. He played one match.

== See also ==
- List of Olympic medalists in water polo (men)
