= Yury Grigorovsky =

Soviet water polo player

Personal information
- Born: March 28, 1939 (age 87) Moscow, Soviet Union

Sport
- Sport: Water polo
Medal record
Representing Soviet Union
Olympic Games
Silver medal – second place	1960 Rome	Team competition
Silver medal – second place	1968 Mexico City	Team competition

Yury Nikolaevich Grigorovsky (Russian: Юрий Николаевич Григоровский, born March 28, 1939) is a Russian water polo player who competed for the Soviet Union in the 1960 Summer Olympics and in the 1968 Summer Olympics.

== Career ==
In 1960 he was a member of the Soviet team which won the silver medal in the Olympic water polo competition. He played six matches and scored two goals.

Eight years later he won his second silver medal with the Soviet team in the water polo tournament at the 1968 Games. He played all eight matches and scored eleven goals.

== See also ==
- List of Olympic medalists in water polo (men)
