= Yevgeny Saltsyn =

Soviet water polo player (born 1929)

Personal information
- Born: 26 February 1929 Crimea, Soviet Union

Sport
- Sport: Water polo
Medal record
Representing Soviet Union
Olympic Games
Silver medal – second place	1960 Rome	Team competition

Yevgeny Ivanovich Saltsyn (Azerbaijani: ?, Russian: Евгений Иванович Сальцын, born 26 February 1929) is an Azerbaijani water polo player who competed for the Soviet Union in the 1960 Summer Olympics. He was born in Crimea. In 1960, he was a member of the Soviet team, which won the silver medal in the Olympic water polo tournament. He played one match.

== See also ==
- List of Olympic medalists in water polo (men)
