= Dorri El-Said =

Egyptian swimmer and water polo player (1927–2015)

Personal information
- Full name: Dorri Abdel Kader El-Said
- Born: 31 January 1927 Cairo, Egypt
- Died: January 2015 (aged 87–88) Al-Badraszajn

Sport
- Sport: Swimming

Dorri Abdel Kader El-Said (31 January 1927 – January 2015) was an Egyptian swimmer and water polo player. He competed at the 1948 Summer Olympics, 1952 Summer Olympics and the 1960 Summer Olympics.

== See also ==
- Egypt men's Olympic water polo team records and statistics
