= András Katona =

Hungarian water polo player (1938–2026)

Personal information
- Born: 20 February 1938 Budapest, Hungary
- Died: 5 March 2026 (aged 88)
Medal record
Men's water polo
Representing Hungary
Olympic Games
Bronze medal – third place	1960 Rome	Team competition

András Katona (20 February 1938 – 5 March 2026) was a Hungarian water polo player who competed in the 1960 Summer Olympics. He was born in Budapest.

In 1960, he was part of the Hungarian water polo team which won the bronze medal in the Olympic tournament. Katona died on 5 March 2026, at the age of 88.

== See also ==
- List of Olympic medalists in water polo (men)
