= Anna Maria Cecchi =

Italian swimmer (1943–2021)

Personal information
- Born: 24 April 1943 Trieste, Italy
- Died: 22 May 2021 (aged 78) Trieste, Italy

Sport
- Sport: Swimming

Anna Maria Cecchi (24 April 1943 – 22 May 2021) was an Italian swimmer. She competed at the 1960 Summer Olympics and the 1964 Summer Olympics.

== Biography ==
Cecchi competed in her first international swimming competition in 1957. At the age of 17, she represented Italy at the 1960 Summer Olympics in Rome. She finished 25th in the 100-metre butterfly and seventh as part of the Italian 4 × 100-metre freestyle relay team. At the 1964 Summer Olympics in Tokyo, her second Olympic appearance, Cecchi placed 12th in the 100-metre butterfly. She also competed at two European Aquatics Championships.

At the national level, Cecchi won several national titles and set Italian records in the 100-metre butterfly and 400-metre freestyle.

After retiring from competitive swimming, Cecchi worked as a swimming coach in Mantua and Trieste. Several of the athletes she coached were later selected for the Italian national team.
