= Leon Nahon =

South African water polo player

Personal information
- Nationality: South African
- Born: 5 March 1938 (age 88) Florence, Italy

Sport
- Sport: Water polo

Leon Nahon (born 5 March 1938) is a South African water polo player. He competed in the men's tournament at the 1960 Summer Olympics.
