= Wally Voges =

South African water polo player

Personal information
- Nationality: South African
- Born: 18 June 1936 (age 88); Benoni, South Africa

Sport
- Sport: Water polo

Wally Voges (born 18 June 1936) is a South African water polo player. He competed in the men's tournament at the 1960 Summer Olympics.
