= Ibrahim Abdel Rahman =

Egyptian water polo player (born 1940)

Personal information
- Nationality: Egyptian
- Born: 1940 (age 84–85) Cairo, Egypt

Sport
- Sport: Water polo

Ibrahim Abdel Rahman (Arabic: ابراهيم عبد الرحمن, born 1940) is an Egyptian water polo player. He competed in the 1960 Summer Olympics.
