= Moukhtar Hussain El-Gamal =

Egyptian water polo player (born 1935)

Personal information
- Nationality: Egyptian
- Born: 5 August 1935 (age 89); Cairo, Egypt

Sport
- Sport: Water polo

Moukhtar Hussain El-Gamal (born 5 August 1935) is an Egyptian water polo player. He competed at the 1960 Summer Olympics and the 1964 Summer Olympics.
