= Mohamed Abdel Aziz Khalifa =

Egyptian swimmer (1925–1960)

Personal information
- Born: 1925 Cairo, Egypt
- Died: 14 November 1960 (aged 34–35) Soviet Union

Sport
- Sport: Swimming

Mohamed Abdel Aziz Khalifa (1925 – 14 November 1960) was an Egyptian swimmer. He competed in the men's 4 × 200 metre freestyle relay at the 1948 Summer Olympics and the water polo tournaments at the 1948, 1952 and 1960 Summer Olympics. He was killed in a military aviation accident in the Soviet Union on 14 November 1960.

== See also ==
- Egypt men's Olympic water polo team records and statistics
