= Daniela Serpilli =

Italian swimmer

Personal information
- Born: 2 February 1944 (age 82) Rome, Italy

Sport
- Sport: Swimming

Daniela Serpilli (born 2 February 1944) is an Italian former swimmer. She competed in two events at the 1960 Summer Olympics.
