= Givi Chikvanaia =

Soviet water polo player

Personal information
- Born: 29 May 1939 Telavi, Soviet Union
- Died: 2 August 2018 (aged 79)

Sport
- Sport: Water polo
Medal record
Representing Soviet Union
Olympic Games
Silver medal – second place	1960 Rome	Team competition
Silver medal – second place	1968 Mexico City	Team competition

Givi Pyotrovich Chikvanaia (Georgian: გივი ჩიქვანაია, Russian: Гиви Петрович Чикваная; 29 May 1939 – 2 August 2018) was a Georgian water polo player who competed for the Soviet Union in the 1960 Summer Olympics and in the 1968 Summer Olympics.

In 1960 he won the silver medal with the Soviet team in the Olympic water polo competition. He played all seven matches and scored seven goals.

Eight years later he won his second silver medal with the Soviet team in the water polo tournament at the 1968 Games. He played all eight matches.

== See also ==
- List of Olympic medalists in water polo (men)
