= Danio Bardi =

Italian water polo player

Personal information
- Born: May 23, 1937 Scandicci, Italy
- Died: July 9, 1991 (aged 54) Florence, Italy

Sport
- Sport: Water polo
Medal record
Representing Italy
Olympic Games
Gold medal – first place	1960 Rome	Team competition

Danio Bardi (23 May 1937 – 9 July 1991) was an Italian water polo player who competed in the 1960 Summer Olympics and in the 1964 Summer Olympics.

In 1960 he was a member of the Italian water polo team which won the gold medal. He played six matches and scored two goals.

Four years later he finished fourth with the Italian team in the water polo competition at the Tokyo Games. He played five matches.

== See also ==
- Italy men's Olympic water polo team records and statistics
- List of Olympic champions in men's water polo
- List of Olympic medalists in water polo (men)
