= Petre Mshvenieradze =

Soviet and Georgian water polo player (1929–2003)

Personal information
- Nationality: Georgian
- Born: Tbilisi, Georgian SSR, Soviet Union 24 March 1929
- Died: 3 June 2003 (aged 74) Moscow, Russia
- Height: 198 cm (6 ft 6 in)
- Weight: 100 kg (220 lb)

Sport
- Sport: Water polo
Medal record
Men's water polo
Representing the Soviet Union
Olympic Games
| Silver medal – second place | 1960 Rome | Team competition |
| Bronze medal – third place | 1956 Melbourne | Team competition |

Petre Mshvenieradze (Georgian: პეტრე მშვენიერაძე; 24 March 1929 – 3 June 2003) was a Georgian water polo player who competed for the Soviet Union in the 1952, 1956 and 1960 Summer Olympics.

He was born in Tbilisi, Georgian SSR, and died in Moscow, Russia. He is the father of water polo players Giorgi and Nuzgari.

In 1952, he was a member of the Soviet team which finished seventh in the Olympic water polo tournament. He played all nine matches and scored at least one goal (not all scorers are known).

Four years later at the 1956 Summer Olympics in Melbourne, he won the bronze medal with the Soviet team. He played all seven matches. However, that year there was an incident that became known as the Blood in the Water match. The semi-final against the Hungarian team took place on the same days as the bloody events in Budapest. The match saw Hungary beat the USSR with a score of 4–0; although, a minute before the final whistle, the infamous fight erupted; and afterwards, without replaying the last moments, the Hungarians were declared winners due to having led before the incident.

At the 1960 Summer Olympics in Rome, he was part of the Soviet team which won the silver medal in the Olympic water polo tournament. He played all seven matches and scored five goals.

== See also ==
- List of Olympic medalists in water polo (men)
