= Rosario Parmegiani =

Italian water polo player (1937–2019)

Personal information
- Born: 12 March 1937 Naples, Italy
- Died: 13 June 2019 (aged 82) Naples, Italy

Sport
- Sport: Water polo
Medal record
Representing Italy
Olympic Games
Gold medal – first place	1960 Rome	Team competition

Rosario Parmegiani (12 March 1937 – 13 June 2019) was an Italian water polo player who competed in the 1960 Summer Olympics and in the 1964 Summer Olympics.

Parmegiani was a squad member of the Italian Olympic team in the 1956 tournament but did not play in a match.

Four years later he won the gold medal with the Italian team in the Olympic tournament. He played six matches and scored seven goals.

In 1964, he was a member of the Italian water polo team which finished fourth in the Olympic tournament. He played all six matches.

== See also ==
- Italy men's Olympic water polo team records and statistics
- List of Olympic champions in men's water polo
- List of Olympic medalists in water polo (men)
