= Giuseppe Avellone =

Italian swimmer

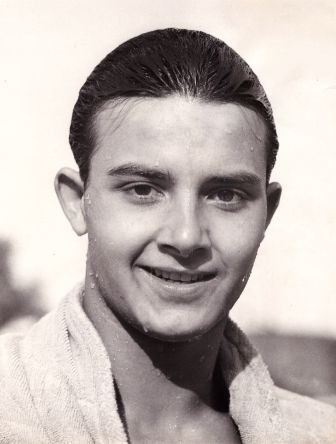

Personal information
- Born: 23 March 1943 (age 83) Marliana, Pistoia, Italy
- Height: 1.75 m (5 ft 9 in)
- Weight: 70 kg (150 lb)

Sport
- Sport: Swimming
- Club: SS Lazio, Rome

Giuseppe Avellone (born 23 March 1943) is a retired Italian backstroke swimmer who competed at the 1960 Summer Olympics. He finished sixth with the 4 × 100 m medley relay team and failed to reach the final of the individual 100 m backstroke event.
