= Amedeo Ambron =

Italian water polo player

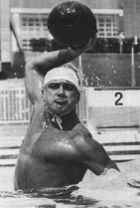

Personal information
- Born: 23 January 1939 (age 87) Benevento, Italy
Medal record
Men's water polo
Representing Italy
Olympic Games
Gold medal – first place	1960 Rome	Team competition

Amedeo Ambron (born 23 January 1939) is an Italian water polo player who competed in the 1960 Summer Olympics. He was born in Benevento.

== Biography ==
In 1960 he was a member of the Italian water polo team which won the gold medal. He played one match and scored one goal.

== See also ==
- Italy men's Olympic water polo team records and statistics
- List of Olympic champions in men's water polo
- List of Olympic medalists in water polo (men)
