= Alexandru Bădiță =

Romanian water polo player

Personal information
- Nationality: Romanian
- Born: 2 October 1937 (age 88) Bucharest, Romania

Sport
- Sport: Water polo

Alexandru Bădiță (born 2 October 1937) is a former water polo player from Romania. He competed at the 1956 Summer Olympics and the 1960 Summer Olympics.
