= Achim Schneider =

German water polo player

Personal information
- Nationality: German
- Born: 31 July 1934 (age 90); Duisburg, Germany

Sport
- Sport: Water polo

Achim Schneider (born 31 July 1934) is a German water polo player. He competed at the 1956 Summer Olympics and the 1960 Summer Olympics.
