= Brunello Spinelli =

Italian water polo player

Personal information
- Born: May 26, 1939 Florence, Italy
- Died: February 6, 2018 (aged 78) Florence, Italy

Sport
- Sport: Water polo
Medal record
Representing Italy
Olympic Games
Gold medal – first place	1960 Rome	Team competition

Brunello Spinelli (May 26, 1939 – February 6, 2018) was an Italian water polo player who competed in the 1960 Summer Olympics.

In the 1960 Olympics water polo tournament he was a member of the Italian water polo team which won the gold medal. He played two matches as goalkeeper.

== See also ==
- Italy men's Olympic water polo team records and statistics
- List of Olympic champions in men's water polo
- List of Olympic medalists in water polo (men)
- List of men's Olympic water polo tournament goalkeepers
