= Luigi Mannelli =

Italian water polo player

Personal information
- Born: February 21, 1939 Naples, Italy
- Died: March 14, 2017 (aged 78) Naples, Italy

Sport
- Sport: Water polo
Medal record
Representing Italy
Olympic Games
Gold medal – first place	1960 Rome	Team competition

Luigi Mannelli (21 February 1939 – 14 March 2017) was an Italian water polo player who competed in the 1956 Summer Olympics and in the 1960 Summer Olympics.

In 1956 he was a member of the Italian water polo team which finished fourth in the Olympic tournament. He played one match.

Four years later he won the gold medal with the Italian team in the Olympic tournament, where he played two matches and scored four goals.

== See also ==
- Italy men's Olympic water polo team records and statistics
- List of Olympic champions in men's water polo
- List of Olympic medalists in water polo (men)
