= Water polo at the 1960 Summer Olympics =

Water polo at the Games of the XVII Olympiad
- Venues: Piscina delle Rose; Stadio Olimpico del Nuoto
- Date: 25 August – 3 September 1960
- Competitors: 150 from 16 nations

Medalists
1st place, gold medalist(s)		Italy
2nd place, silver medalist(s)		Soviet Union
3rd place, bronze medalist(s)		Hungary

Final results for the water polo tournament at the 1960 Summer Olympics.

== Qualification ==
Event	Dates	Hosts	Quotas	Qualified Teams
Host Nation	15 June 1955	(France) Paris	1	Italy
1956 Summer Olympics	28 November - 7 December 1956	(Australia) Melbourne	6	Hungary Yugoslavia Soviet Union United States United Team of Germany Romania
Oceania Qualifier	24 February 1960	(Australia) Melbourne	1	Australia
European & Middle East Qualifier	18 June 1960	(Socialist Federal Republic of Yugoslavia) Zagreb	1	United Arab Republic
European & Middle East Qualifier	25-26 June 1960	(Netherlands) Groningen	1	Belgium
European & Middle East Qualifier	26 June 1960	(Italy) Camogli	1	France
American Qualifier			2	Brazil
American Qualifier			2	Argentina
Asian Qualifier			1	Japan
African Qualifier			1	South Africa
Wild Card			1	Netherlands
Total			16	

== Medal summary ==
Gold	Silver	Bronze
Italy Amedeo Ambron; Danio Bardi; Giuseppe D'Altrui; Salvatore Gionta; Giancarlo Guerrini; Franco Lavoratori; Gianni Lonzi; Luigi Mannelli; Rosario Parmegiani; Eraldo Pizzo; Dante Rossi; Brunello Spinelli	Soviet Union Viktor Ageev; Givi Chikvanaia; Leri Gogoladze; Boris Goykhman; Yury Grigorovsky; Anatoly Kartashov; Vyacheslav Kurennoy; P'et're Mshveniyeradze; Vladimir Novikov; Yevgeny Saltsyn; Vladimir Semyonov	Hungary András Bodnár; Ottó Boros; Zoltán Dömötör; László Felkai; Dezső Gyarmati; István Hevesi; László Jeney; Tivadar Kanizsa; György Kárpáti; András Katona; János Konrád; Kálmán Markovits; Mihály Mayer; Péter Rusorán

== Participating nations ==
For the team rosters see: Water polo at the 1960 Summer Olympics – Men's team squads.

- Argentina (7)
- Australia (10)
- Belgium (7)
- Brazil (9)
- France (11)
- United Team of Germany (9)
- Hungary (14)
- Italy (12)
- Japan (7)
- Netherlands (9)
- Romania (7)
- South Africa (9)
- Soviet Union (11)
- United Arab Republic (10)
- United States (11)
- Yugoslavia (11)

== Results ==
=== Group A ===
Team	Pld	W	D	L	GF	GA	GD	Pts
Italy	3	3	0	0	21	8	+13	6
Romania	3	2	0	1	12	5	+7	4
Japan	3	0	1	2	5	15	−10	1
United Arab Republic	3	0	1	2	7	17	−10	1

Source: sports-reference.com

=== Group B ===
Team	Pld	W	D	L	GF	GA	GD	Pts
Soviet Union	3	3	0	0	20	10	+10	6
United Team of Germany	3	2	0	1	15	9	+6	4
Argentina	3	0	1	2	7	14	−7	1
Brazil	3	0	1	2	7	16	−9	1

Source: sports-reference.com

=== Group C ===
Team	Pld	W	D	L	GF	GA	GD	Pts
Yugoslavia	3	3	0	0	15	4	+11	6
Netherlands	3	1	1	1	9	8	+1	3
South Africa	3	1	1	1	7	12	−5	3
Australia	3	0	0	3	7	14	−7	0

Source: sports-reference.com

=== Group D ===
Team	Pld	W	D	L	GF	GA	GD	Pts
Hungary	3	3	0	0	27	9	+18	6
United States	3	2	0	1	17	13	+4	4
France	3	1	0	2	10	23	−13	2
Belgium	3	0	0	3	8	17	−9	0

Source: sports-reference.com

== Semi-finals ==
=== Group A ===
Team	Pld	W	D	L	GF	GA	GD	Pts
Italy	3	3	0	0	9	3	+6	6
Soviet Union	3	2	0	1	8	8	0	4
Romania	3	0	1	2	8	10	−2	1
United Team of Germany	3	0	1	2	7	11	−4	1

Source: sports-reference.com

=== Group B ===
Team	Pld	W	D	L	GF	GA	GD	Pts
Yugoslavia	3	3	0	0	10	4	+6	6
Hungary	3	2	0	1	11	5	+6	4
United States	3	1	0	2	11	19	−8	2
Netherlands	3	0	0	3	8	12	−4	0

Source: sports-reference.com

== Final round ==
Team	Pld	W	D	L	GF	GA	GD	Pts
Italy	3	2	1	0	7	4	+3	5
Soviet Union	3	1	1	1	7	8	−1	3
Hungary	3	0	2	1	7	8	−1	2
Yugoslavia	3	1	0	2	6	7	−1	2

Source: sports-reference.com

== Final standings ==
Place	Nation
1	Italy
2	Soviet Union
3	Hungary
4	Yugoslavia
5	Romania
6	United Team of Germany
7	United States
8	Netherlands
9	South Africa
10	France
11	Argentina
12	Brazil
13	United Arab Republic
14	Japan
15	Australia
16	Belgium

== Sources ==
- PDF documents in the LA84 Foundation Digital Library:
  - Official Report of the 1960 Olympic Games (download, archive) (pp. 552–555, 617–634)
- Water polo on the Olympedia website
  - Water polo at the 1960 Summer Olympics (men's tournament)
- Water polo on the Sports Reference website
  - Water polo at the 1960 Summer Games (men's tournament) (archived)
