= Water polo at the 1952 Summer Olympics – Men's team squads =

The following is the list of squads that took part in the men's water polo tournament at the 1952 Summer Olympics.

- CF=Centre forward
- CB=Centre back
- D=Defender
- GK=Goalkeeper

== Argentina ==
Argentina entered a squad of ten players. They scored six goals but only three scorers are known.

Head coach:

| No. | Pos. | Player | DoB | Age | Caps | Club | Tournament games | Tournament goals |
|---|---|---|---|---|---|---|---|---|
| | | Osvaldo Codaro | 9 December 1930 | 21 | ? | | 3 | ? |
| | GK | Luis Díez | 2 November 1923 | 28 | ? | | 3 | ? |
| | | Luis González | | | ? | | 0 | 0 |
| | | Rubén Maidana | | | ? | | 0 | 0 |
| | | Roberto Marino | | | ? | | 0 | 0 |
| | | Luis Normandín | 19 September 1932 | 19 | ? | | 3 | ? |
| | | Mario Sebastián | 7 May 1926 | 26 | ? | | 3 | 3 |
| | | Ladislao Szabo | 11 April 1923 | 29 | ? | | 3 | ? |
| | | Carlos Visentín | 28 November 1918 | 33 | ? | | 3 | ? |
| | | Marcelo Visentín | 30 May 1914 | 38 | ? | | 3 | ? |

== Australia ==
Australia entered a squad of ten players. They scored two goals but all scorers are unknown.

Head coach:

| No. | Pos. | Player | DoB | Age | Caps | Club | Tournament games | Tournament goals |
|---|---|---|---|---|---|---|---|---|
| | | Peter Bennett | 11 July 1926 | 26 | ? | (Suriname (Kingdom of the Netherlands)) Dolfish Swimming Team Paramaribo | 2 | ? |
| | | Anthony Fenech | | | ? | | 0 | 0 |
| | | John Foster | 11 May 1931 | 21 | ? | | 2 | ? |
| | | Malcolm Hastie | 29 February 1929 | 23 | ? | (Australia) Victoria | 2 | ? |
| | | Frank Jordan | 19 August 1932 | 19 | ? | | 2 | ? |
| | GK | Doug Laing | 19 March 1931 | 21 | ? | | 2 | ? |
| | | James O'Doherty | | | ? | | 0 | 0 |
| | | William Orchard | 31 October 1929 | 22 | ? | | 2 | ? |
| | | Raymond Smee | 25 October 1930 | 21 | ? | | 2 | ? |
| | | Keith Whitehead | 9 September 1931 | 20 | ? | | 0 | 0 |

== Austria ==
Austria entered a squad of eleven players. They scored fourteen goals but all scorers are unknown.

Head coach:

| No. | Pos. | Player | DoB | Age | Caps | Club | Tournament games | Tournament goals |
|---|---|---|---|---|---|---|---|---|
| | | Erich Bohuslav | 28 April 1927 | 25 | ? | (Austria) Schwimm-Union Wien | 5 | ? |
| | | Julius Depaoli | 29 March 1923 | 29 | ? | (Austria) Schwimm-Union Wien | 5 | ? |
| | | Ernst Endl | 25 December 1929 | 22 | ? | | 3 | ? |
| | | Anton Kunz | 9 January 1915 | 37 | ? | | 1 | ? |
| | | Heinrich Krumpfholz | 19 March 1925 | 27 | ? | (Austria) Schwimm-Union Wien | 3 | ? |
| | | Johann Liebenberger | 27 October 1930 | 21 | ? | | 5 | ? |
| | GK | Johann Reichel | 20 July 1922 | 30 | ? | | 5 | ? |
| | | Peter Steinwender | 2 November 1928 | 23 | ? | (Austria) Schwimm-Union Wien | 0 | 0 |
| | | Rudolf Styskalik | 18 May 1929 | 23 | ? | (Austria) Schwimm-Union Wien | 4 | ? |
| | | Hellmut Theimer | 15 February 1928 | 22 | ? | | 2 | ? |
| | | Franz Zigon | 9 March 1924 | 28 | ? | | 2 | ? |

== Belgium ==
Belgium entered an unknown number of players ten of them are known. They scored 27 goals but only two scorers are known.

Head coach:

| No. | Pos. | Player | DoB | Age | Caps | Club | Tournament games | Tournament goals |
|---|---|---|---|---|---|---|---|---|
| | GK | Théo-Léo de Smet | 9 November 1917 | 34 | ? | | 7 | ? |
| | | Marcel Heyninck | 9 March 1931 | 21 | ? | | 8 | 1 |
| | | André Laurent | 14 February 1931 | 21 | ? | | 8 | ? |
| | | Georges Leenheere | 21 November 1919 | 32 | ? | | 2 | ? |
| | GK | François Maesschalck | 19 October 1921 | 30 | ? | | 1 | ? |
| | | Alphonse Martin | 18 April 1930 | 22 | ? | | 8 | ? |
| | | Joseph Reynders | 16 December 1929 | 22 | ? | | 1 | ? |
| | | Roland Sierens | 15 July 1925 | 27 | ? | | 6 | ? |
| | | Jozef Smits | 28 March 1930 | 22 | ? | | 7 | ? |
| | | Johan Van Den Steen | 8 January 1929 | 23 | ? | | 8 | 1 |

== Brazil ==
The following players represented Brazil.

- Claudino Castro
- Márvio dos Santos
- Lucio Figueirêdo
- João Havelange
- Douglas Lima
- Henrique Melmann
- Edson Peri
- Sérgio Rodrígues
- Leo Rossi
- Samuel Schemberg
- Daniel Sili

== Egypt ==
The following players represented Egypt.

- Ahmed Fouad Nessim
- Jack Hakim
- Samir Gharbo
- Taha El-Gamal
- Omar Sabry
- Abdel Aziz Khalifa
- Abdel Aziz El-Shafei
- Dorri Abdel Kader
- Galal El-Din Abdel Meguid Abou El-Kheir
- Salah El-Din El-Sahrawi

== Germany ==
The following players represented Germany.

- Günter Heine
- Paul Uellendahl
- Erich Sauermann
- Wilfried Bode
- Willi Sturm
- Heinz Zander
- Ferdinand Panke
- Emil Bildstein
- Philipp Dotzer

== Great Britain ==
The following players represented Great Britain.

- Ian Johnson
- Charles Brand
- Jack Jones
- Gerry Worsell
- Ron Turner
- Terry Miller
- Jack Fergusson
- David Murray
- Stan Hawkins

== Hungary ==
Hungary entered a squad of 13 players. They scored 53 goals.

Head coach:

| No. | Pos. | Player | DoB | Age | Caps | Club | Tournament games | Tournament goals |
|---|---|---|---|---|---|---|---|---|
| | GK | Róbert Antal | 21 July 1921 | 31 | ? | (Hungary) Budapesti Bástya | 2 | 0 |
| | | Antal Bolvári | 6 May 1932 | 20 | ? | (Hungary) Budapesti Honvéd Sportegyesület | 6 | 1 |
| | | Dezső Fábián | 17 December 1918 | 33 | ? | (Hungary) Budapesti Kinizsi | 1 | 0 |
| | | Dezső Gyarmati | 23 October 1927 | 24 | ? | (Hungary) Budapesti Dózsa | 8 | 7 |
| | | István Hasznos | 8 December 1924 | 27 | ? | (Hungary) Szolnoki Dózsa | 2 | 7 |
| | GK | László Jeney | 30 May 1923 | 29 | ? | (Hungary) Budapesti Vasas Sport Club | 6 | 0 |
| | | György Kárpáti | 23 June 1935 | 17 | ? | (Hungary) Budapesti Kinizsi | 5 | 4 |
| | | Dezső Lemhényi | 9 December 1917 | 34 | ? | (Hungary) Budapesti Dózsa | 2 | 5 |
| | | Kálmán Markovits | 26 August 1931 | 20 | ? | (Hungary) Budapesti Vasas Sport Club | 6 | 3 |
| | | Miklós Martin | 29 June 1931 | 21 | ? | (Hungary) Újpesti Dózsa Sportegyesület | 2 | 5 |
| | | Károly Szittya | 18 June 1918 | 34 | ? | (Hungary) Ferencvárosi Torna Club | 3 | 5 |
| | | István Szivós | 20 August 1920 | 31 | ? | (Hungary) Budapesti Vasas Sport Club | 6 | 16 |
| | | György Vizvári | 18 December 1928 | 23 | ? | (Hungary) Budapesti Dózsa | 7 | 0 |

== India ==
The following players represented India.

- Birendra Basak
- David Sopher
- Kedar Shah
- Isaac Mansoor
- Sambhu Saha
- Sachin Nag
- Khamlillal Shah
- Bijoy Barman
- Jehangir Naegamwalla
- Ran Chandnani

== Italy ==
Italy entered a squad of eleven players. They scored 43 goals but all scorers are unknown.

Head coach: Giulio De Filippis and Mario Majoni

| No. | Pos. | Player | DoB | Age | Caps | Club | Tournament games | Tournament goals |
|---|---|---|---|---|---|---|---|---|
| | | Gildo Arena | 25 February 1921 | 31 | ? | (Italy) Canottieri Napoli | 8 | ? |
| | | Lucio Ceccarini | 13 December 1930 | 21 | ? | (Italy) S.S. Lazio Nuoto | 1 | ? |
| | | Renato De Sanzuane | 5 March 1925 | 27 | ? | (Italy) Rari Nantes Camogli | 7 | ? |
| | GK | Raffaello Gambino | 28 April 1928 | 24 | ? | (Italy) S.S. Lazio Nuoto | 7 | ? |
| | | Salvatore Gionta | 22 December 1930 | 21 | ? | (Italy) S.S. Lazio Nuoto | 2 | ? |
| | | Maurizio Mannelli | 1 January 1930 | 22 | ? | (Italy) Circolo Canottieri Napoli | 8 | ? |
| | | Geminio Ognio | 13 December 1917 | 34 | ? | (Italy) S.S. Lazio Nuoto | 4 | ? |
| | | Carlo Peretti | 5 March 1930 | 22 | ? | (Italy) Rari Nantes Florentia | 5 | ? |
| | | Enzo Polito | 29 October 1926 | 25 | ? | (Italy) Circolo Canottieri Napoli | 6 | ? |
| | | Cesare Rubini | 2 November 1923 | 28 | ? | (Italy) Rari Nantes Camogli | 7 | ? |
| | GK | Renato Traiola | 19 December 1924 | 27 | ? | (Italy) Circolo Canottieri Napoli | 1 | ? |

== Mexico ==
The following players represented Mexico.

- Juan Trejo
- Arturo Coste
- Manuel Castro
- José Olguín
- Otilio Olguín
- Modesto Martínez

== Netherlands ==
The Netherlands entered an unknown number of players only seven of them are known. They scored 43 goals only 38 scorers are unknown.

Head coach: Frans Kuyper

| No. | Pos. | Player | DoB | Age | Caps | Club | Tournament games | Tournament goals |
|---|---|---|---|---|---|---|---|---|
| | | Gerrit Bijlsma | 17 November 1929 | 22 | ? | (Netherlands) 't IJ Amsterdam | 9 | 3 |
| | | Cor Braasem | 15 May 1923 | 29 | ? | (Netherlands) Neptunus Arnhem | 9 | 5 |
| | | Joop Cabout | 28 October 1927 | 24 | ? | (Netherlands) HZC De Robben | 9 | 1 |
| | | Rudy van Feggelen | 14 April 1924 | 28 | ? | (Netherlands) Haagse Zwem- en Polo Club | 9 | 18 |
| | GK | Max van Gelder | 20 October 1924 | 27 | ? | (Netherlands) Haagse Zwem- en Polo Club | 9 | ? |
| | | Nijs Korevaar | 31 December 1927 | 24 | ? | (Netherlands) Zwemvereniging De Maas Rotterdam | 9 | 3 |
| | | Frits Smol | 6 July 1924 | 28 | ? | (Netherlands) Haagse Zwem- en Polo Club | 9 | 8 |

== Portugal ==
Portugal entered a squad of ten players. They scored two goals but both are unknown.

Head coach:

| No. | Pos. | Player | DoB | Age | Caps | Club | Tournament games | Tournament goals |
|---|---|---|---|---|---|---|---|---|
| | | Francisco Alves | 24 May 1923 | 29 | ? | (Portugal) Sport Algés e Dafundo | 2 | ? |
| | | Eduardo Barbeiro | 11 January 1932 | 20 | ? | (Portugal) Sport Algés e Dafundo | 2 | ? |
| | | Óscar Cabral | 18 November 1921 | 30 | ? | (Portugal) Sport Algés e Dafundo | 1 | ? |
| | | José Manuel Correia | 26 July 1925 | 26 | ? | (Portugal) Sport Algés e Dafundo | 1 | ? |
| | GK | Máximo Couto | 14 September 1923 | 28 | ? | (Portugal) Sport Algés e Dafundo | 2 | ? |
| | | João Franco do Vale | 13 July 1930 | 22 | ? | (Portugal) Sport Algés e Dafundo | 2 | ? |
| | | Rodrigo Basto Junior | 29 March 1919 | 33 | ? | (Portugal) Sport Algés e Dafundo | 1 | ? |
| | | Fernando Madeira | 12 May 1932 | 20 | ? | (Portugal) Sport Algés e Dafundo | 1 | ? |
| | | Armando Moutinho | 4 January 1915 | 37 | ? | (Portugal) Sport Algés e Dafundo | 2 | ? |

== Romania ==
The following players represented Romania.

- Zoltan Norman
- Atila Kelemen
- Adalbert Iordache
- Gavrila Törok
- Zoltan Hospodar
- Octavian Iosim
- Francisc Şimon
- Arcadie Sarcadi

== South Africa ==
The following players represented South Africa.

- William Aucamp
- Ron Meredith
- Gerald Goddard
- Douglas Melville
- Johnnie van Gent
- Des Cohen
- Solly Yach
- Dennis Pappas

== Soviet Union ==
The Soviet Union entered a squad of 13 players. They scored 38 goals but only four scorers are known.

Head coach: Vadim Kuznetsov and Ivan Dmitriev

| No. | Pos. | Player | DoB | Age | Caps | Club | Tournament games | Tournament goals |
|---|---|---|---|---|---|---|---|---|
| | | Vadim Bubok | 1926 | | ? | (Soviet Union) ? Leningrad | 0 | 0 |
| | GK | Boris Goykhman | 28 April 1919 | 33 | ? | (Soviet Union) VVS MVO Moscow | 9 | ? |
| | | Lev Kokorin | 1918 | | ? | (Soviet Union) VMS Leningrad | 5 | ? |
| | GK | Igor Libel | 1914 | | ? | (Soviet Union) VMS Leningrad | 0 | 0 |
| | | Aleksandr Liferenko | 1930 | | ? | (Soviet Union) CDSA Moscow | 8 | ? |
| | | P'et're Mshveniyeradze | 24 March 1929 | 23 | ? | (Soviet Union) VVS MVO Moscow | 9 | 1 |
| | | Valentin Prokopov | 10 June 1929 | 23 | ? | (Soviet Union) CDSA Moscow | 9 | 2 |
| | | Nikolay Prostyakov | | | ? | (Soviet Union) VVS MVO Moscow | 0 | 0 |
| | | Yevgeny Semyonov | 1920 | | ? | (Soviet Union) VVS MVO Moscow | 9 | ? |
| | | Yury Shlyapin | 11 February 1932 | 20 | ? | (Soviet Union) Dinamo Moscow | 5 | ? |
| | | Yury Teplov | 1931 | | ? | (Soviet Union) Torpedo Moscow | 6 | ? |
| | | Vitaly Ushakov | 1920 | | ? | (Soviet Union) Torpedo Moscow | 1 | ? |
| | | Anatoly Yegorov | 1922 | | ? | (Soviet Union) VVS MVO Moscow | 2 | 1 |

== Spain ==
The following players represented Spain.

- Leandro Ribera Abad
- Ricardo Conde
- Josep Bazán
- Roberto Queralt
- Antonio Subirana
- Agustín Mestres
- Juan Abellán
- Francisco Castillo

== Sweden ==
The following players represented Sweden.

- Rune Källqvist
- Erik Holm
- Roland Spångberg
- Stig Johansson
- Arne Jutner
- Hans Hellbrand
- Åke Julin
- Bo Larsson

== United States ==
The United States entered a squad of eleven players. They scored 35 goals but only 19 scorers are known.

Head coach: Urho Saari (coach); John Curran (manager)

| No. | Pos. | Player | DoB | Age | Caps | Club | Tournament games | Tournament goals |
|---|---|---|---|---|---|---|---|---|
| | GK | Harry Bisbey | 10 May 1931 | 21 | ? | (United States) U.S. Coast Guard | 9 | ? |
| | | Marvin Burns | 6 July 1928 | 24 | ? | (United States) Lynwood Swim Club | 5 | 1 |
| | | Norman Dornblaser | 4 November 1933 | 18 | ? | (United States) El Segundo Swim Club | 7 | 1 |
| | | Robert Hughes | 15 December 1930 | 21 | ? | (United States) University of Southern California | 9 | 6 |
| | | Edward Jaworski | 11 March 1926 | 26 | ? | (United States) New York Athletic Club | 8 | ? |
| | | Robert Koehler | | | ? | | 0 | 0 |
| | | William Kooistra | 26 August 1926 | 25 | ? | (United States) Illinois Athletic Club | 7 | 7 |
| | | Norman Lake | 8 December 1932 | 19 | ? | (United States) El Segundo Swim Club | 2 | ? |
| | | James Norris | 7 July 1930 | 22 | ? | (United States) El Segundo Swim Club | 8 | ? |
| | | John Spargo | 3 June 1931 | 21 | ? | (United States) U.S. Air Force | 5 | 4 |
| | | Peter Stange | 28 February 1931 | 21 | ? | (United States) El Segundo Swim Club | 3 | ? |

== Yugoslavia ==
Yugoslavia entered a squad of eleven players. They scored 44 goals but only four scorers are known.

Head coach:

| No. | Pos. | Player | DoB | Age | Caps | Club | Tournament games | Tournament goals |
|---|---|---|---|---|---|---|---|---|
| | | Juraj Amšel | 1924 | | ? | (Socialist Federal Republic of Yugoslavia) HAVK Mladost | 0 | 0 |
| | | Veljko Bakašun | 14 June 1920 | 32 | ? | (Socialist Federal Republic of Yugoslavia) Jadran Split | 6 | ? |
| | | Marko Brainović | 17 July 1920 | 32 | ? | (Socialist Federal Republic of Yugoslavia) Jadran Split | 3 | ? |
| | | Vladimir Ivković | 25 July 1929 | 23 | ? | (Socialist Federal Republic of Yugoslavia) VK Jug Dubrovnik | 9 | ? |
| | | Zdravko Ježić | 17 August 1931 | 20 | ? | (Socialist Federal Republic of Yugoslavia) HAVK Mladost | 2 | ? |
| | GK | Zdravko-Ćiro Kovačić | 6 July 1925 | 27 | ? | (Socialist Federal Republic of Yugoslavia) Primorj Rijeka | 9 | ? |
| | | Ivo Kurtini | 23 June 1922 | 30 | ? | (Socialist Federal Republic of Yugoslavia) Primorj Rijeka | 9 | 4 |
| | | Lovro Radonjić | 26 November 1925 | 26 | ? | (Socialist Federal Republic of Yugoslavia) Mornar Split | 9 | ? |
| | | Dragoslav D. Šiljak | 1933 | 19 | ? | | 0 | 0 |
| | | Ivo Štakula | 25 February 1923 | 29 | ? | (Socialist Federal Republic of Yugoslavia) VK Jug Dubrovnik | 9 | ? |
| | | Boško Vuksanović | 4 January 1928 | 24 | ? | (Socialist Federal Republic of Yugoslavia) VK Partizan | 6 | ? |
