= Portugal at the 1952 Summer Olympics =

- IOC code: POR
- NOC: Olympic Committee of Portugal

in Helsinki
- Competitors: 71 (68 men and 3 women) in 10 sports
- Flag bearer: Máximo Couto (Water polo)
- Officials: 2
- Medals Ranked 40th: Gold 0 Silver 0 Bronze 1 Total 1

Summer Olympics appearances (overview)
- 1912; 1920; 1924; 1928; 1932; 1936; 1948; 1952; 1956; 1960; 1964; 1968; 1972; 1976; 1980; 1984; 1988; 1992; 1996; 2000; 2004; 2008; 2012; 2016; 2020; 2024

Portugal competed at the 1952 Summer Olympics in Helsinki, Finland.

A delegation of 71 competitors, 68 men and 3 women, took part in 45 events in 10 sports. The sailing team won the nation's only medal at these Olympics (bronze). For the first time, Portugal participated in the Gymnastics events and, also for the first time, with three female competitors.

== Medalists ==
=== Bronze ===
- Francisco de Andrade and Joaquim Mascarenhas de Fiúza — Sailing, Star.

== Athletics ==
Men's 100m:

- R. Maia — 1st round: 6th (heat 11)
- T. Salvador Paquete — 1st round: 5th (heat 5)

Men's 200m:

- E. Eleutério — 1st round: 5th (heat 5)
- F. Casimiro — 1st round: 4th (heat 15)

Men's 400m:

- F. Casimiro — 1st round: 7th (heat 6)

Men's 400m Hurdles:

- Fernando Fernandes — 1st round: 4th (heat 7)

Men's 4 × 100 m Relay:

- E. Eleutério, F. Casimiro, R. Maia and T. Salvador Paquete — 1st round: 6th (heat 1)

Men's triple jump:

- E. Lopes — qualifiers: 13th (heat 1)
- R. Ramos — 12th (14,69)

Men's Decathlon:

- Fernando Fernandes — 16th (5604 points)

== Equestrian ==
Men's Individual Dressage:

- A. Reymão Nogueira — 20th (429,5 points)
- Fernando Paes - 26th (346 points)
- Francisco Valadas Jr. — 21st (422 points)

Men's Team Dressage:

- A. Reymão Nogueira, Fernando Paes and Francisco Valadas Jr. — 8th (1196,5 points)

Men's Individual Eventing:

- António Pereira de Almeida — 23rd (216,2 points)
- Fernando Marques Cavaleiro — 19th (183 points)
- Joaquim Duarte Silva — 24th (218,8 points)

Men's Team Eventing:

- António Pereira de Almeida, Fernando Marques Cavaleiro and Joaquim Duarte Silva — 4th (618 points)

Men's Individual Jumping:

- Henrique Alves Calado — 16th (20 points)
- J. Alves Carvalhosa — 26th (24 points)
- J. Craveiro Lopes — 19th (20 points)

Men's Team Jumping:

- Henrique Alves Calado, J. Alves Carvalhosa and J. Craveiro Lopes — 8th (64 points)

== Fencing ==
Ten fencers, all men, represented Portugal in 1952.

Men's épée

- Álvaro Pinto — 2nd round: 9th (poule 1)
- Carlos Dias — 2nd round: 9th (poule 3)
- Álvaro Mário Mourão — semi-final: 9th (poule 1)

Men's team épée

- Álvaro Pinto, Carlos Dias, Álvaro Mário Mourão, Francisco Uva, João Costa — 1st round: 3rd (poule 4)

Men's sabre

- João Pessanha — 1st round: 8th (poule 2)
- José Ferreira — 1st round: 7th (poule 5)
- Álvaro Silva — 1st round: 6th (poule 7)

Men's team sabre

- Álvaro Silva, José Ferreira, Augusto Barreto, Jorge Franco, João Pessanha — 1st round: 3rd (poule 5)

== Gymnastics ==
Men's Individual Competition:

- A. Araújo Leite — 178th (77,85 points)
  1. Floor — 151st (15,50)
  2. Rings — 159th (15,15)
  3. Pommeled Horse — 157th (12,85)
  4. Long Horse — 180th (11,25)
  5. Parallel Bars — 177th (12,85)
  6. Horizontal Bar — 174th (10,25)
- Joaquim Santa Marta Granger — 162nd (88,50 points)
  1. Floor — 153rd (15,45)
  2. Rings — 107th (17,05)
  3. Pommeled Horse — 171st (11,30)
  4. Long Horse — 178th (13,25)
  5. Parallel Bars — 139th (16,25)
  6. Horizontal Bar — 145th (15,20)
- M. Prazeres — 173rd (84,50 points)
  1. Floor — 166th (14,75)
  2. Rings — 177th (12,60)
  3. Pommeled Horse — 113th (15,80)
  4. Long Horse — 142nd (16,90)
  5. Parallel Bars — 175th (13,15)
  6. Horizontal Bar — 171st (11,30)
- M. Robalo Gouveia — 146th (93,35 points)
  1. Floor — 126th (16,35)
  2. Rings — 131st (16,00)
  3. Pommeled Horse — 167th (11,55)
  4. Long Horse — 110th (17,65)
  5. Parallel Bars — 164th (14,65)
  6. Horizontal Bar — 109th (16,75)
- M. Seara Cardoso — 183rd (61,50 points)
  1. Floor — 159th (15,10)
  2. Rings — 181st (9,80)
  3. Pommeled Horse — 173rd (10,85)
  4. Long Horse — 184th (5,65)
  5. Parallel Bars — 179th (10,00)
  6. Horizontal Bar — 176th (10,10)
- Raul Caldeira — 174th (82,80 points)
  1. Floor — 129th (16,30)
  2. Rings — 178th (11,10)
  3. Pommeled Horse — 169th (11,45)
  4. Long Horse — 172nd (14,55)
  5. Parallel Bars — 173rd (13,25)
  6. Horizontal Bar — 126th (16,15)

Men's Team Competition:

- A. Araújo Leite, Joaquim Santa Marta Granger, M. Prazeres, M. Robalo Gouveia, M. Seara Cardoso and Raul Caldeira — 23rd (428,65 points)

Women's Individual Competition:

- Dália Vairinho Cunha — 109th (65,08 points)
  1. Floor — 113th (16,53)
  2. Vault — 96th (16,50)
  3. Parallel Bars — 123rd (14,69)
  4. Balance Beam — 86th (17,36)
- Maria Silva Amorim — 124th (62,29 points)
  1. Floor — 123rd (16,23)
  2. Vault — 106th (16,20)
  3. Parallel Bars — 131st (12,50)
  4. Balance Beam — 86th (17,36)
- Natália Cunha e Silva — 133rd (50,16 points)
  1. Floor — 133rd (14,29)
  2. Vault — 128th (14,52)
  3. Parallel Bars — 129th (13,79)
  4. Balance Beam — 133rd (7,36)

== Modern pentathlon ==
Three male pentathletes represented Portugal in 1952.

Men's Individual Competition:

- António Jonet — 48th (210 points)
  1. Horse-riding — 48 points
  2. Fencing — 26 points
  3. Shooting — 43 points
  4. Swimming — 47 points (6:16,3)
  5. Cross-country — 46 points (17:46,8)
- José Pereira — 46th (197 points)
  1. Horse-riding — 21 points
  2. Fencing — 48 points
  3. Shooting — 31 points
  4. Swimming — 49 points (7:26,2)
  5. Cross-country — 48 points (18:04,2)
- Ricardo Durão — 41st (179 points)
  1. Horse-riding — 31 points
  2. Fencing — 16 points
  3. Shooting — 35 points
  4. Swimming — 48 points (7:07,7)
  5. Cross-country — 49 points (18:04,5)

Men's Team Competition:

- António Jonet, José Pereira and Ricardo Durão — 15th (546 points)

== Rowing ==
Portugal had nine male rowers participate in one out of seven rowing events in 1952.

Men's eight — 1st repechage
3rd (heat 1)

- Felisberto Fortes
- Albino Simões Neto
- Manuel Regala
- João Cravo
- João Alberto Lemos
- Carlos da Benta
- João da Paula
- Zacarias Andias
- José Pinheiro (cox)

== Sailing ==
Men's 5,5m:

- Duarte de Almeida Bello, Fernando Pinto Coelho Bello and Júlio de Sousa Leite Gorinho — 4th (4450 points)

Men's Dragon:

- A. Graça, Carlos Rogenmoser Lourenço and J. Miguez Tito — 8th (2782 points)

Men's Finn:

- Mário Quina — 17th (2787 points)

Men's Star:

- Francisco de Andrade and J. Mascarenhas de Fiuza — 3rd (4903 points)

== Shooting ==
Four shooters represented Portugal in 1952.

25 m pistol

- Albino de Jesus — 44th (530)
- Rogério Tavares — 21st (556)

50 m rifle, three positions

- Luís Howorth — 31st (1114)
- Joaquim Sampaio — 37th (1095)

50 m rifle, prone

- Luís Howorth — 37th (393)
- Joaquim Sampaio — 55th (381)

== Swimming ==
Men

Ranks given are within the heat.

Athlete	Event	Heat		Semifinal		Final	
Athlete	Event	Time	Rank	Time	Rank	Time	Rank
Fernando Madeira	100 m freestyle	1:02.6	6	Did not advance			
Guilherme Patroni	100 m freestyle	1:03.7	6	Did not advance			
Fernando Madeira	400 m freestyle	5:08.6	6	Did not advance			
Eduardo Barbeiro	100 m backstroke	1:13.0	6	Did not advance			
Eurico Surgey	100 m backstroke	1:13.7	7	Did not advance			
Eduardo Barbeiro	200 m breaststroke	3:04.6	8	Did not advance			

== Water polo ==
Men's competition:

- Francisco Alves, Eduardo Barbeiro, Óscar Cabral, José Manuel Correia, Máximo Couto, João Franco do Vale, Rodrigo Basto Junior, Fernando Madeira and Armando Moutinho — eliminating round (17th - 21st)

== Officials ==
- César de Melo (chief of mission)
- G. Brito Capelo (rowing)
- M. Saraiva Lobo (rowing)
