= Deaths in May 2000 =

The following is a list of notable deaths in May 2000.

Entries for each day are listed alphabetically by surname. A typical entry lists information in the following sequence:

- Name, age, country of citizenship at birth, subsequent country of citizenship (if applicable), reason for notability, cause of death (if known), and reference.

== May 2000 ==
=== 1 ===
- Marvin W. Bursch, 87, American businessman and politician, complications of Parkinson's disease.
- Cláudio Christovam de Pinho, 77, Brazilian footballer.
- John Emery, 84, British paediatric pathologist, house fire.
- Gil Fates, 85, American television producer.
- Chen Kingkwan, 87, Chinese Olympic sprinter (1936).
- David J. Mahoney, 76, American businessman and philanthropist, heart disease.
- Gibby Mbasela, 37, Zambian footballer.
- Steve Reeves, 74, American actor, lymphoma.
- Nora Swinburne, 97, British actress.
- Jukka Tapanimäki, 38, Finnish game programmer, coronary heart disease.
- Gérard Théberge, 69, Canadian Olympic ice hockey player, bronze medalist (1956)

=== 2 ===
- Gretel Ammann, 53, Spanish philosopher.
- Tom Baldwin, 38, American football player (New York Jets).
- Laurie Calvin Battle, 87, American politician, member of the U.S. House of Representatives (1947-1955).
- Jerome L. Blaska, 80, American politician.
- Len Clark, 86, English cricketer.
- Belva Cottier, 79, American Sioux activist and social worker.
- Gervase Cowell, 73, British spy.
- John Crittle, 56, Australian fashion designer and retailer, emphysema.
- Otho Davis, 66, American football trainer, pancreatic cancer.
- Bob Homme, 81, American-Canadian television actor, known for his role as The Friendly Giant, prostate cancer.
- Bobbi Martin, 60, American country and pop music singer, songwriter, and guitarist, cancer.
- Billy Munn, 88, British jazz pianist.
- Harry Newman, 90, American football player (New York Giants).
- Sundar Popo, 56, Trinidadian and Tobagonian musician, complications from diabetes.
- Christina Marie Riggs, 28, American convicted murderer, execution by lethal injection.
- Teri Thornton, 65, American jazz singer, bladder cancer.
- Norman Wainwright, 85, English competition swimmer and Olympian (1932, 1936, 1948).

=== 3 ===
- Ibrahim Akasha, Kenyan drug lord, shot.
- Lewis Allen, 94, British film and television director.
- Richard Friederich Arens, 81, American mathematician, stroke.
- Obie Baizley, 82, Canadian politician (Manitoba).
- Júlia Báthory, 98, Hungarian glass designer.
- Ed Chapman, 94, American baseball player (Washington Senators).
- William Keys, 77, Australian Army officer, cancer.
- Mamuka Kikaleishvili, 39, Georgian actor and film director, sleeping pill overdose.
- Bryan Lobb, 69, English cricket player.
- Yoshinao Nakada, 76, Japanese composer, colorectal cancer.
- John Joseph O'Connor, 80, American Roman Catholic prelate, brain cancer.
- Shakuntala Paranjpye, 94, Indian writer, actress, and social worker.
- Jon Vincent, 38, American pornographic actor, heroin overdose.
- Edward J. Sponga, 82, American Jesuit priest in the Society of Jesus.

=== 4 ===
- Aleksandr Akhiezer, 88, Soviet Ukrainian physicist.
- Sir Derick Ashe, 81, British diplomat.
- J. T. "Blondy" Black, 79, American football player (Buffalo Bisons, Baltimore Colts).
- Sandra Bréa, 47, Brazilian actress and model, respiratory arrest.
- Hendrik Casimir, 90, Dutch physicist known for the Casimir effect.
- Humberto Donoso, 61, Chilean football player.
- Jacques Gerschwiler, 101, Swiss figure skater and coach.
- Leslie Jeffers, 90, British wrestler and Olympian (1936).
- Alwyn Kurts, 84, Australian drama and comedy actor, liver failure.
- Kieran Nugent, Provisional Irish Republican Army volunteer, cardiovascular disease.
- Diana Ross, 89, English children's author.
- Sugi Sito, 73, Mexican wrestler known as El Orgullo de Oriente.

=== 5 ===
- Edward Ashley-Cooper, 93, Australian actor, congestive heart failure.
- Gino Bartali, 85, Italian racing cyclist, heart attack.
- Robert C. Bassett, 89, American newspaper publisher, lawyer, and political advisor, Alzheimer's disease.
- Patrick Castagne, 83, Guyanese-born Trinidadian composer, heart failure.
- Jan Firbas, 79, Czech linguist.
- Don Kindt, 74, American football player (Chicago Bears).
- Rolf Magener, 89, German escapee from India during World War II.
- Bill Musselman, 59, American basketball coach, stroke.

=== 6 ===
- Benoy Choudhury, Indian freedom fighter and politician.
- Miša David, 57, Serbian architect.
- Eleazar Jiménez, 71, Cuban chess master.
- Gordon McClymont, 79, Australian agricultural scientist and ecologist, Parkinson's disease.
- Lee Moore, 61, Saint Kitts and Nevis politician.
- Roger von Norman, 91, Hungarian-born German film editor and director.
- John Clive Ward, 75, British-Australian physicist, respiratory illness.
- David W. Williams, 90, American district judge (United States District Court for the Central District of California), pneumonia.
- Sir Peter William Youens, 84, British diplomat and colonial administrator, pneumonia.

=== 7 ===
- Dov Bar-Nir, 88, Belgium-Israeli politician.
- Douglas Fairbanks Jr., 90, American actor and the son of Douglas Fairbanks, heart attack.
- Hideo Hamamura, 71, Japanese marathon runner and Olympian (1956), cancer.
- Ferrel Harris, 59, American NASCAR racecar driver.
- Henry Laskau, 83, American Olympic racewalker (1948, 1952, 1956).
- José Luis López de Lacalle, Spanish journalist and trade unionist, killed by the ETA.
- Homer Thompson, 93, Canadian classical archaeologist.
- Timmy Payungka Tjapangati, 58, Aboriginal Australian artist.
- Masaru Shintani, 72, Japanese-Canadian master of karate, heart attack.

=== 8 ===
- Pita Amor, 81, Mexican poet.
- Stanley Boxer, 73, American abstract artist.
- X Brands, 72, German-American actor, pneumonia and sepsis.
- Glen Bredon, 67, American mathematician.
- William C. Brennan, 81, American lawyer and politician.
- Dédé Fortin, 37, Canadian musician, suicide.
- Hubert Maga, 83, Dahomey politician, heart attack.
- Henry Nicols, 26, American HIV/AIDS activist, car accident.

=== 9 ===
- György Csordás, 71, Hungarian swimmer and Olympian (1948, 1952, 1956).
- Arthur Davis, 94, American animator (Looney Tunes, The Jetsons, Challenge of the GoBots).
- Chris Evans, 53, Canadian ice hockey player.
- William Fairchild, 82, English author, playwright, director and screenwriter.
- Todor Nikolov, 54, Bulgarian football player and Olympian (1968).
- John Nucatola, 92, American basketball player, coach and referee.
- Exequiel Ramírez, 75, Chilean Olympic cyclist (1948).
- Carmen Romano, 74, First Lady of Mexico (1976-1982), cardiac arrest.
- Zheng Weishan, 84, Chinese general and politician.

=== 10 ===
- Bart the Bear, 23, Kodiak bear, cancer.
- Jules Deschênes, 76, Canadian judge.
- Raymond Eddé, 87, Lebanese statesman.
- Jarl Emcken, 79, Danish Olympic rower (1948).
- Martin Farndale, 71, British army general.
- Carden Gillenwater, 82, American baseball player.
- Margaret Harris, 95, British costume designer.
- Kiyoshi Kuromiya, 57, Japanese-American author and civil rights activist, cancer.
- Virgil W. Raines, 89, American thoroughbred racehorse trainer.
- Kaneto Shiozawa, 46, Japanese voice actor, cerebral contusion.
- Dick Sprang, 84, American comic book artist (Batman).
- Craig Stevens, 81, American actor, cancer.

=== 11 ===
- Verna Aardema, 88, American writer.
- David Bretherton, 76, American film editor (Cabaret, The Diary of Anne Frank, Clue), Oscar winner (1973), pneumonia.
- Dale Jennings, 82, American LGBT rights activist, playwright and author.
- René Muñoz, 62, Cuban actor and screenwriter, cancer.
- Albert Roberts, 91, British politician.
- Hanny Thalmann, 83, Swiss women's rights activist and politician.
- Paula Wessely, 93, Austrian actress, bronchitis.

=== 12 ===
- Pete Abele, 83, American politician (U.S. Representative for Ohio's 10th congressional district), Alzheimer's disease.
- Bob Challis, 68, English rugby player.
- Dymphna Clark, 83, Australian linguist and educator.
- Dave Crowe, 66, New Zealand cricket player.
- Dong Kingman, 89, Chinese American artist and watercolor master, pancreatic cancer.
- Adam Petty, 19, American race car driver, car crash.
- Herbert Schröder, 54, German footballer.

=== 13 ===
- Paul Bartel, 61, American actor, writer and director, heart attack following liver cancer surgery.
- Ernst Endl, 70, Austrian Olympic water polo player (1952).
- Olivier Greif, 50, French composer.
- Stanley Korchinski, 71, Canadian politician, member of the House of Commons of Canada (1958-1984).
- Akira Nozawa, 85, Japanese footballer.
- Boško Perošević, 43, Serbian politician, shot.
- Fred Schwab, 82, American cartoonist.
- Jumbo Tsuruta, 49, Japanese professional wrestler known as Jumbo Tsuruta, complications from liver transplant.
- Cesare Valletti, 77, Italian operatic tenor, heart attack.
- Melzar Williams, 86, American baseball player.

=== 14 ===
- Urda Arneberg, 71, Norwegian actress.
- Carlos Aitor Castillo, 86, Peruvian painter.
- George Carpozi Jr., 79, American journalist, biographer and non-fiction author, emphysema and heart failure.
- Johnny Cook, 51, American gospel singer formerly of the Happy Goodman Family, congestive heart failure.
- Sarah Mavis Dabbs, 78, American baseball player.
- Garrett Eckbo, 89, American landscape architect, stroke.
- C. Eric Lincoln, 75, American scholar, diabetes.
- Bob Maza, 60, Australian actor and playwright, cardiac arrest.
- Keizō Obuchi, 62, Japanese politician and Prime Minister, stroke.
- Rodman Rockefeller, 68, American businessman and philanthropist, cancer.
- Karl Shapiro, 86, American poet.

=== 15 ===
- Roberto Benedicto, 83, Filipino lawyer, diplomat and banker.
- Edwin Charles Boulton, 72, American bishop, auto-immune disorder.
- David Glyn Bowen, 66, Welsh Congregationalist minister, educator, and missionary, cancer.
- Geoff Goddard, 62, English songwriter, singer and instrumentalist, heart attack.
- Robert Lee Knous, 82, American politician.
- Alfred Kuchevsky, 68, Soviet ice hockey defenceman and Olympian (1956, 1960).
- George Marshall, 96, American conservationist and political activist.
- Gösta Prüzelius, 77, Swedish actor, leukemia.
- Théo-Léo De Smet, 82, Belgian Olympic water polo player (1948, 1952).
- Anthony Squire, 86, British screenwriter and director.

=== 16 ===
- Bodacious, 11–12, American bucking bull and ProRodeo Hall of Fame inductee, kidney failure.
- Averil Demuth, 94, English writer of children's stories.
- Frido Frey, 78, German basketball player (New York Knicks).
- Evald Hermaküla, 58, Estonian actor and director, suicide by hanging.
- Petter Hugsted, 78, Norwegian ski jumper and Olympian (1948).
- Ghulam Ali Okarvi, 80, Pakistani Islamic scholar and jurist.
- Andrzej Szczypiorski, 72, Polish novelist and politician.
- Ronald Jay Williams, 72, Trinidadian businessman and politician.

=== 17 ===
- Ruslan Alikhadzhiyev, 38-39, Chechen brigadier general and politician, presumably murdered.
- Yola Cain, 45-46, Jamaican aviator, breast cancer.
- Kanwar Durga Chand, 77-78, Indian politician.
- Donald Coggan, 90, English Anglican and 101st Archbishop of Canterbury.
- Pierre Van Der Haeghen, 78, Belgian Olympic sailor (1948).
- Hümeyra Hanımsultan, 82, Ottoman princess.
- Salih Koç, 82, Turkish Olympic equestrian (1948, 1956, 1960).
- Elsie Lessa, 86, Brazilian journalist and writer of American descent.
- William H. Poteat, 81, American philosopher, scholar and professor.
- Sajjan, 79, Indian actor.
- Angelina Stepanova, 94, Soviet and Russian stage and film actress, teacher.

=== 18 ===
- Domingos da Guia, 87, Brazilian football player and manager, stroke.
- Julie Dawn, 80, English singer.
- Bruno Fait, 75, Italian Olympic racewalker (1952).
- Denis Gifford, 72, British writer, broadcaster and journalist.
- Doyle Lade, 79, American baseball player (Chicago Cubs).
- Yusuf Ludhianvi, 67/68, Pakistani Muslim scholar, author and muhaddith, murdered.

=== 19 ===
- James Verne Adams, 86, American politician.
- Tony Arefin, 38, Bangladeshi art director, heart attack.
- Lee Brewster, 57, American drag queen and transvestite activist, cancer.
- Irene Calvert, 91, Northern Irish politician and economist.
- Wayne Crouse, 75, American violist, cancer.
- John Grigas, 79, American gridiron football player (Chicago Cardinals, Card-Pitt, Boston Yanks).
- Willie Hubert, 87, American baseball player.
- Evgeniy Vasilievich Khrunov, 66, Soviet cosmonaut (Soyuz 5/Soyuz 4), heart attack.
- Larry Lamb, 70, British newspaper editor.

=== 20 ===
- Adelaide Aglietta, 59, Italian politician, breast cancer.
- Charles Antenen, 70, Swiss football player.
- Edward Bernds, 94, American director.
- Freddy Bloom, 86, British journalist.
- Dick Brown, 74, Canadian football player.
- Dag Coward, 90, Norwegian economist.
- Loyd Jowers, 73, American restaurateur, heart attack.
- David Pearce, 41, Welsh heavyweight boxing champion.
- Jean-Pierre Rampal, 78, French flautist, heart failure.
- Joseph Reed Sams, 76, Canadian politician, member of the House of Commons of Canada (1962-1963).
- Malik Sealy, 30, American basketball player, traffic collision.

=== 21 ===
- Jules Alfonse, 88, American gridiron football player (Cleveland Rams).
- Dame Barbara Cartland, 98, English novelist.
- Arda Denkel, 50, Turkish philosopher, brain tumor.
- Buzzy Drootin, 80, American jazz drummer, cancer.
- Sir John Gielgud, 96, English actor (Arthur, Becket, Julius Caesar), Oscar winner (1982).
- Dulcie Holland, 87, Australian composer and music educator.
- Mark R. Hughes, 44, American entrepreneur and founder of Herbalife, accidental overdose.
- Erich Mielke, 92, German communist official.
- Zhao Puchu, 92, Chinese religious leader and calligrapher.
- József Soproni, 87, Hungarian footballer and Olympian (1936).
- Mahmoud Zuabi, Syrian politician and Prime Minister, suicide by gunshot.

=== 22 ===
- William G. Akridge, 93, American judge.
- Bahadoor, Indian actor, cerebral hemorrhage.
- Richard Milton Bloch, 78, American computer programmer, cancer.
- Krzysztof Boruń, 76, Polish physicist, journalist and science fiction writer.
- David Brookman, 83, Australian politician, traffic collision.
- Alcide Courcy, 85, Canadian politician
- Peter Dalwood, 77, Australian rules footballer.
- Eldridge Dickey, 54, American gridiron football player (Oakland Raiders), stroke.
- Davie Fulton, 84, Canadian politician and judge.
- Gary Kerkorian, 70, American football player (Pittsburgh Steelers, Baltimore Colts).
- Bennie Lee Sinclair, 61, American poet, novelist, and short story writer, heart attack.
- David Chadwick Smith, 68, Canadian economist.
- José Rafael Molina Ureña, 79, President of the Dominican Republic.

=== 23 ===
- Eddy Blondeel, 94, Belgian commander of the SAS during WWII.
- Roger Garrett, 59, American actor.
- Jack Halliday, 71, American gridiron football player (Los Angeles Rams).
- Mishari bin Abdulaziz Al Saud, Saudi prince as member of the House of Saud.

=== 24 ===
- Kevin Lyons, 77, Australian politician.
- Miguel Gil Moreno de Mora, 32, Spanish cameraman and war correspondent, shot.
- Kurt Schork, 53, American reporter and war correspondent, shot in an ambush.
- Majrooh Sultanpuri, 80, Indian Urdu poet and lyricist.
- Cliff Sutter, 89, American tennis player.
- Oleg Yefremov, 72, Soviet/Russian actor and theatre producer, lung disease.

=== 25 ===
- Pegaret Anthony, 84, English artist.
- Karlo Bašić, 88, Croatian Olympic sailor (1952).
- Ken Bousfield, 80, British golfer.
- Lefty Byers, 94, American basketball coach.
- Nicholas Clay, 53, British actor (Excalibur, Zulu Dawn, Evil Under the Sun), liver cancer.
- Elizabeth Durack, 84, Australian artist and writer.
- Evert Johanson, 81, Norwegian Olympic boxer (1948).
- Seymour S. Kety, 84, American neuroscientist.
- Francis Lederer, 100, Austrian-American actor.
- Jaya Pathirana, 79, Sri Lankan Supreme Court justice.

=== 26 ===
- Roland Charles, 61, American photographer and gallerist, complications from a heart attack.
- Robert Cockrell, 50, South African rugby union player (Western Province, national team).
- Helena Corrêa de Barros, 90, Portuguese photographer.
- César Gaudin, 55, Puerto Rican Olympic weightlifter (1972).
- Sandra Gwyn, 65, Canadian journalist and writer, breast cancer.
- William McCaughey, 70, American sound engineer (The Deer Hunter, Rocky, King Kong), Oscar winner (1979).
- Hamp Pool, 85, American football player (Chicago Bears), coach (Los Angeles Rams), and scout, congestive heart failure.
- Max Schellenberg, 72, Swiss racing cyclist.
- Samuel A. Taylor, 87, American playwright and screenwriter, heart failure.
- Vernon Crompton Woodward, 83, Canadian fighter pilot and flying ace during World War II.
- Sō Yamamura, 90, Japanese actor and film director, heart attack.
- Mongi Soussi Zarrouki, 64, Tunisian hurdler and Olympian (1960).

=== 27 ===
- Inga Abel, 53, German actress, breast cancer.
- Prince Gonzalo de Bourbon, 62, Spanish aristocrat, leukemia.
- Dale Carson, 78, American politician and FBI Special Agent.
- Paul Crosfield, 70, Greek Olympic hurdler (1948).
- Heikki Hietanen, 85, Finnish Olympic swimmer (1936).
- Kazimierz Leski, 87, Polish engineer, fighter pilot, and (counter-)intelligence officer.
- Murray MacLehose, 82, British diplomat, Governor of Hong Kong.
- Kazimierz Mazur, 70, Polish Olympic modern pentathlete (1960).
- Maurice Richard, 78, Canadian hockey player (Montreal Canadiens), cardiovascular disease.
- Jane Stoll, 71, American baseball player.

=== 28 ===
- Keith William Allan, 53, Australian solicitor, murdered.
- George Irving Bell, 73, American scientist and mountaineer, complications from leukemia.
- Ihor Bilozir, 45, Ukrainian composer, injuries sustained in an assault.
- Mario Crete, 86, Canadian Olympic wrestler (1948).
- Donald Davies, 75, Welsh computer scientist.
- Maraden Panggabean, 77, Indonesian Army general and Defense Minister, cerebrovascular disease.
- Vincentas Sladkevičius, 79, Lithuanian Cardinal of the Roman Catholic Church.
- Dave Stief, 44, American football player (St. Louis Cardinals, Washington Redskins), esophageal cancer.
- Eric Turner, 31, American gridiron football player (Cleveland Browns, Baltimore Ravens, Oakland Raiders), stomach cancer.
- Francisco Vestil, 85, Filipino basketball player and Olympian (1948).
- Heleen Sancisi Weerdenburg, 56, Dutch historian, cancer.

=== 29 ===
- David R. Bunch, 74, American writer, heart attack.
- Clement Isong, 80, Nigerian banker and politician.
- Robert T. Oliver, 90, American author and lecturer.
- Martin Pence, 95, American district judge (United States District Court for the District of Hawaii).
- Aubrey Richards, 79, British actor.
- Anthony Spinelli, 73, American actor and producer.
- Doreen Young Wickremasinghe, 93, British communist politician.

=== 30 ===
- Tex Beneke, 86, American bandleader and musician (Glenn Miller Orchestra), respiratory failure.
- Iko Carreira, 66, Angolan army general and politician.
- Robert P. Casey, 68, American lawyer and politician, Governor of Pennsylvania (1987-1995), amyloidosis and a viral infection.
- J.L. Dawkins, 64, American politician.
- Doris Hare, 95, Welsh actress.
- Daisuke Inoue, 58, Japanese singer and composer, suicide by hanging.
- Maurie Robertson, 75, New Zealand rugby league footballer.
- Ram Vilas Sharma, 87, Indian academic, poet and writer.
- Bill Thomas, 78, American costume designer.

=== 31 ===
- Horace Busby, 76, American opinion journalist, speechwriter, consultant, and public relations expert.
- John Coolidge, 93, American businessman and son of President Calvin Coolidge.
- Marney Cunningham, 66, Irish international rugby player and Catholic priest.
- Andrew Faulds, 77, British actor and Lpolitician.
- Erich Kähler, 94, German mathematician.
- Petar Mladenov, 63, Bulgarian communist diplomat and politician.
- Nikolaos Oikonomides, 66, Greek byzantinist.
- Rodolfo Pini, 73, Uruguayan football player.
- Tito Puente, 77, American musician, songwriter ("Oye Como Va") and record producer, cardiac surgery.
- Joe Puma, 72, American jazz guitarist.
- Hank Ruszkowski, 74, American baseball player (Cleveland Indians).
- Walter Sparrow, 73, English actor (Robin Hood: Prince of Thieves, Ever After, The Secret Garden).
- Johnnie Taylor, 66, American singer, heart attack.
- A. Jeyaratnam Wilson, 72, Sri Lankan Tamil academic, historian and author.
