= John Spargo (water polo) =

American water polo player (born 1931)

Personal information
- Full name: John Arthur Spargo
- Nickname: Jack
- Born: June 3, 1931 (age 95) Hermosa Beach, California, U.S.
- Occupation: Commercial Airline Pilot
- Height: 5 ft 9 in (175 cm)
- Weight: 140 lb (64 kg)
- Spouse: Sheila Blumenthal (July 1957)
- Children: 2 boys, 1 girl

Sport
- Sport: Water polo
- College team: University of California Los Angeles
- Club: El Segundo Swim Club; Olympic Club, San Fran, CA
- Coached by: Urho Saari (El Segundo High); Brud Cleveland (UCLA); Urho Saari (52 Olympics)
Medal record
Representing United States
Pan American Games
| Bronze medal – third place | 1951 Buenos Aires | Men's tournament |

John "Jack" Arthur Spargo (born June 3, 1931) is a former American swimmer and water polo player who competed for the University of California Los Angeles. He participated in the 1952 Helsinki Olympics in the Men's Olympic water polo tournament under Coach Urho Saari that exceeded expectations, but placed fourth just out of medal contention. Spargo later served as an Air Force fighter pilot, and had a thirty-year career as a commercial pilot, moving with his family to Las Vegas in 1970.

== Early life ==
Urho Saari, 1930

John Spargo, usually known as "Jack" was born June 3, 1931 in Hermosa Beach, California to Mr. and Mrs. Nelson M. Spargo. He competed in swimming and played water polo for El Segundo High School under Head Coach Urho Saari, graduating in 1949. A dominant High School program, under Coach Saari, between 1942-1978, El Segundo won 12 Southern California CIF Water Polo Championships. During Spargo's tenure with El Segundo's water polo team, they won the Southern California League Championship, later known as the CIF Southern Section, consecutively from the years 1947 through 1950.

Coach Saari stressed strong conditioning for his water polo players to promote speed, and enable more frequent fast breaks to the opponent's goal. He trained his players to take perimeter shots and learn accuracy, hoping to reduce reliance on the center forward position and increase scoring from field players, including drivers and wings who shot near the left or right sides of the goal.

=== Distance swimmer ===
Skilled as a distance freestyle swimmer, in a swim meet at the Pasadena Aquatic Club at the Los Angeles Stadium on June 17, 1948, Spargo won the 1500-meter event with a time of 20:57:0. After his high school water polo years, Spargo trained and competed in water polo and swimming with the El Segundo Swim Club from around 1950-1954, primarily under his former High School Coach, Urho Saari.

Skilled as a distance swimmer in both the pool and open water, Spargo, representing El Segundo Swim Club in his Sophomore year at UCLA, placed first in the annual pier to pier swim in Long Beach from Belmont pier to Rainbow pier in early August, 1950. He completed the event of just under 3 miles in a winning time of 1:15:24, despite a strong current. Known as an established local open water swimmer, he had previously won the Pier-to-Pier swim in 1949 in the record time of 1:09:04, and in 1950 had also won the Crystal Pier and Huntington Beach swims. He placed second in the Pier-to-Pier Swim in 1948.

=== University of California Los Angeles ===
Spargo swam and played college water polo for the UCLA Bruins serving as a team captain in his Senior year. He attended a single semester at the University of California Berkeley, then transferred to the University of California Los Angeles, competing in collegiate water polo from around 1950-1953 primarily under Coach Brud Cleveland who coached both water polo and swimming. In 1952, Spargo specialized in the 1500-meter freestyle event at UCLA, and set a school record in the 200-yard backstroke with a time of 2:24.6. During the consecutive years of 1952-1954, he made the all Pacific-8 Conference Team during his participation in collegiate water polo. Through 1951, Olympian, future Olympic coach, and Long Beach City College coach, Monte Nitzkowski was one of Spargo's team mates on the UCLA swim team. During his years of collegiate attendance, Spargo was on American Athletic Union National Championship water polo teams in the consecutive years 1951-1954, and was honored as an AAU All-American in each of those four years.

In international competition, while representing the U.S. National team, Spargo, at 19 and just out of High School, captured a team bronze medal at the 1951 Pan American Games in Buenos Aires, Argentina.

=== 1952 Olympic trials ===
At the 1952 swim trails at the Astoria Pool in New York City, Spargo's El Segundo Swim Club played against six teams, with a final match against the favored team from Fullerton-Whittier. In a close game with the Fullerton team, Spargo's teammate Bill Dornblaser scored a late goal with only nineteen seconds left in regulation play, breaking a 5-5 tie, to win the game 6-5. With most of the members selected to participate in the Helsinki Olympics, the El Segundo team had had to raise money to finance the trip to New York for the trials. Former Olympic swimmer and performer Esther Williams helped host a fundraiser sponsored by the Aquacade Aquatic Show, and the local Standard Oil Company contributed to the effort as well. Bob Hughes, a high scoring center forward, and Norman "Bill" Dornblaser who also often played center were critical El Segundo Swim Club teammates selected with Spargo.

== 1952 Helsinki Olympics ==
Spargo was a member of the American water polo team which finished fourth out of 16 competing nations that made group play in the 1952 Olympic water polo tournament, where he was managed by Head Olympic Coach Urho Saari, and played in five matches. Exceeding expectations in a strong field, the U.S. won nearly all their games in the preliminary rounds, and though they lost to Italy, they advanced to the semi-finals. The loss to Italy in the early rounds was disappointing, and many US members believed the officiating strongly favored Italy. In in the final water polo rounds in early August, 1952, the US team lost to Yugoslavia 4-2, and were shut out by Hungary 4-0, settling for a fourth place finish with pre-game favorite Hungary taking the gold medal, Yugoslavia taking the Silver medal, and Italy taking the bronze medal. After the Olympics, Spargo swam for San Francisco's Olympic Swim Club.

=== Marriage ===
While an Air Force Lieutenant in 1957, Spargo announced his engagement to Sheila Blumenthal. At the time of their marriage, Sheila was a Stanford student from Chicago's Highland Park, and had studied at the University of Geneva. The couple first met while skiing in Sun Valley, Idaho, and married in a Las Vegas elopement on July 25, 1957, in a small chapel. They started their family in Spargo's native California, but in 1970, moved their three children back to Las Vegas where they had previously married. Sheila was an accomplished watercolor painter, participated in Las Vegas Art Shows, and was a member of the Nevada Watercolor Society. She enjoyed tennis, golf, and skiing.

=== Careers ===
In an early career, Spargo worked as a Los Angeles County lifeguard during the summer to improve his swimming skills. In 1950, he competed for the Manhattan Beach guards in an inter-city competition in the South Bay Area. He served in the American Air Force as a jet fighter pilot through the mid to late 1950's, obtaining the rank of Lieutenant. He later had a roughly thirty year career as a commercial airline pilot flying CD-9 aircraft for several airlines that eventually became Delta. Drawing on considerable experience as a pilot, he once landed a commercial jet with a damaged tire on a runway covered in flame retardant.

By 2016, Spargo had retired, continuing to live in the Las Vegas suburb of Summerlin with wife Sheila, who died in May, 1924 after 67 years of marriage.

=== Honors ===
In 1981, he was inducted into the USA Water Polo Hall of Fame and was a member of the El Segundo High School Hall of Fame.
