= Norman Lake =

American water polo player (1932–2012)

- Age 19, taken from 1952 Helsinki Olympic team photograph

Personal information
- Full name: Norman Ezra Lake
- Nationality: USA
- Born: December 8, 1932 Inglewood, California, U.S.
- Died: 2012 (aged 79–80)

Sport
- Sport: Water polo
- College team: El Camino College
- Club: El Segundo Swim Club
- Coached by: Urho Saari (El Segundo, El Camino)
Medal record
Representing United States
Pan American Games
Bronze medal – third place	1951 Buenos Aires	Men's tournament

Norman Ezra Lake (December 8, 1932 – 2012) was an American water polo player who competed in the 1952 Summer Olympics in Helsinki, Finland.

Lake was born December 8, 1932 in Inglewood, California to father Ezra Lyman Lake and mother Elva Johnson. He attended El Segundo High School where he competed on their swimming and water polo teams under Coach Urho Saari.

== El Camino College ==
He later attended El Camino College where he continued to be coached by USA Water Polo Hall of Fame Coach Saari. Lake received a Varsity Letter in water polo from El Camino college in 1953. A strong regional team, in May 1952, El Camino College placed a close second to Fullerton College in the California State Junior College Swimming Championships.

== 1952 Olympic trials in New York ==
Playing with the El Segundo team under Urho Saari, at the 1952 Olympic trials at New York's Astoria Pool, in early July, 1952, Lake's El Segundo team defeated the "B Team" of the New York Athletic Club 15-2, then defeated the Fullerton-Whittier Team 6-5, and on July 3 defeated the strong New York Athletic Club's A-team 5-2, qualifying them to represent the U.S. at the 1952 Helsinki Olympics. Strong scorers for Lake's El Segundo team included Robert Hughes and Norman Dornblaser. Dornblaser scored a goal with only twenty seconds remaining in regulation play to break a 5-5 tie during the game with strong team Fullerton-Whittier to win 6-5.

== 1952 Helsinki Olympics ==
Lake was a member of the American water polo team which finished fourth in the 1952 Helsinki Olympic tournament. He played two matches. The team that year was composed almost entirely of current or former members of the El Segundo High School team, and trained for the Olympics at the El Segundo Swim Club under Olympic coach Urho Saari. Exceeding expectations in a strong field, the U.S. won nearly all their games in the preliminary rounds, and though they lost to Italy, they advanced to the semi-finals. The loss to Italy in the early rounds was disappointing, and many US members believed the officiating strongly favored Italy. In in the final water polo rounds in early August, 1952, the US team lost to Yugoslavia 4-2, and were shut out by Hungary 4-0, settling for a fourth place finish. The strongly favored team Hungary took the gold, Yugoslavia took the silver, and Italy took the bronze medal.

In international competition, Lake earned a team bronze medal in water polo at the Pan American Games in Buenos Aires, Argentina in 1951.

At the age of 57, having retired to Elmwood Street in Dallas, Texas, Lake married Lynn Adele Cillo, 47, a secretary, in July 1990.

He died in 2012 around the age of 79.
