= Álvaro Silva =

Álvaro Silva may refer to:

- Álvaro Silva (athlete) (1965–2025), Portuguese sprinter
- Álvaro Silva (fencer) (1920–1983), Portuguese fencer
- Álvaro Silva (footballer) (born 1984), Spanish–Filipino footballer
- Álvaro Silva Calderón (born 1929), Venezuelan Secretary General of OPEC during 2002–2003
