= Theimer =

Theimer is a surname. It may refer to:

- Axel Theimer (born 1946), Austrian conductor, composer, singer and author
- Gretl Theimer (1910–1972), Austrian actress
- Hellmut Theimer (1928–1984), Austrian water polo player
- Michael Theimer (born 1950), American sports shooter
- Reinhard Theimer (1948–2020), German hammer thrower
