= József Soproni =

József Soproni may refer to:

- József Soproni (footballer) (1913–2000), Hungarian footballer
- József Soproni (composer) (1930–2021), Hungarian composer
