= Manuel Castro =

Manuel Castro may refer to:

- Manuel Castro Almeida (born 1957), Portuguese lawyer and politician
- Manuel Castro Ruiz (1918–2008), Mexican Bishop of the Roman Catholic Church
- Manuel Castro (footballer) (born 1995), Uruguayan professional footballer
- Manuel Castro (water polo) (born 1923), Mexican water polo player
- Manuel Castro y del Valle (born 1944), Mexican politician

== See also ==
- Manuel de Castro (1885–1944), Spanish sports journalist, football executive, manager, referee, and politician
- Manoel de Castro Villas Bôas (1907–1979), Brazilian entrepreneur, writer, and journalist
