= Sauermann =

Sauermann is a German language habitational surname. Notable people with the name include:

- Erich Sauermann (1919–1984), German water polo player
- Lisa Sauermann (1992), German mathematician
- Sakkie Sauermann (1944–2014), South African rugby union player
