= Bob Saari =

American water polo player (born 1948)

Personal information
- Full name: Robert Paul Saari
- Born: June 7, 1948 (age 78) Hawthorne, California, US
- Occupations: Lifeguard, Restaurant Manager
- Height: 188 cm (6 ft 2 in)
- Weight: 80 kg (176 lb)
- Relatives: Brother, Roy Saari; Father, Coach Urho Saari

Sport
- Sport: Water polo
- Position: Center Forward (WP)
- College team: Long Beach State University
- Coached by: Don Gambril (Long Beach State); Urho Saari (El Segundo)

Robert Paul "Bob" Saari (born June 7, 1948) is an American water polo player. He competed in the men's tournament at the 1964 Summer Olympics.

Saari was born June 7, 1948 in Hawthorne, California to mother Wanda and father Urho Saari. Bob attended and played water polo for El Segundo High School and El Segundo Swim Club where he was coached by his Water Polo Hall of Fame father Urho. Bob began playing Varsity water polo at El Segundo High School in his Freshman year. In his Sophomore High School year, he helped lead El Segundo High to the California Interscholastic Federation (CIF) Southern Section championship, and was credited with four goals in the team's 5-4 victory over Fullerton in the final match. Bob's father and Coach Urho believed Bob did not excel in swimming competition as much as his brother Roy, but that he had great potential as a water polo player, particularly in his ability to control the ball.

== Long Beach State University ==
Saari attended and played water polo for Long Beach State University where he was a 1970 graduate. At Long Beach State, he was managed and trained in swimming and water polo by Hall of Fame Coach Don Gambril from 1967-1970. A high achieving swimming team, Hans Fassnacht, a 1972 Olympic silver medalist, swam for Long Beach state during Saari's tenure with the water polo team.

== 1964 Tokyo Olympics ==
Saari participated in the 1964 Summer Olympics in Tokyo where the U.S. water polo team tied for ninth place. Pre-games favorite Hungary took the gold medal, Yugoslavia took the silver, and the Soviet Union took the bronze.

=== Careers ===
In his professional life, he served as a lifeguard in Los Angeles County. He later managed a restaurant in California's Mammoth Lakes for over thirty years.
