= Dan Drown =

American water polo player (born 1942)

Personal information
- Full name: Daniel Hannon Drown
- Born: October 24, 1942 (age 83) Santa Ana, California, United States
- Education: UCLA Business '64; USC Gould School of Law JD 1968
- Occupations: Lifeguard, Attorney
- Spouse: Karen Green (m. 1968)

Sport
- Sport: Water polo
- College team: University of California Los Angeles
- Club: El Segundo Swim Club (Pre-Olympic training)
- Coached by: Bob Horn, UCLA WP; Urho Saari ('64 Olympics)

Dan Hannon Drown (born October 24, 1942) was a former American water polo player. He competed in water polo and swimming at the University of California Los Angeles, and participated in the men's Olympic water polo tournament at the 1964 Summer Olympics in Tokyo. During college he worked as a Los Angeles area lifeguard during summers and after attending law school at the University of Southern California he worked as a Los Angeles area attorney.

Drown was born October 4, 1942, in Santa Ana, California to Dr. and Mrs. Dan C. Drown. Spending many of his High School years in the Encino area, he attended Birmingham High School in Van Nuys, California, where he competed on the swim team. At Birmingham High, Drown was a President of the Student body, and received All American honors in swimming. In a more distinctive honor, Drown was a recipient of an All-City Helms foundation award in swimming.

== University of California Los Angeles ==
A June 1964 graduate, Drown attended and competed in both water polo and swimming for the University of California Los Angeles enrolling around 1960, where he was initially coached in swimming by Byrne Fernelius in 1962. He began playing water polo for UCLA as a Freshman around 1961-1962, and won a varsity letter that year. He received a second varsity letter in 1963 under UCLA's Hall of Fame coach Bob Horn. Drown was a member of Beta Theta Pi, and was a President of the Associated Men's Students organization. He graduated with a Business and Accounting major. Among his athletic honors, Drown was a team captain, and earned Athletic Association of Western Universities All-team honors in Water Polo.

Drown trained with the El Segundo Water Polo team in preparation for the 1964 Olympics under Head Coach Urho Saari. He qualified for the Olympics at the 1964 Olympic trials in Astoria, New York, requiring the team to win against the City of Commerce team. Their selection was largely based on having more total goals scored then the other teams competing.

== 1964 Olympics ==
Drown competed in Olympic men's water polo tournament at the 1964 Tokyo Olympics where the U.S. team ended the competition tied for ninth place. The team performed above expectations in preliminary rounds, as Drown's team mates initially selected for the 1964 team included brothers Paul, Ned and Chick McIlroy, Ralph Whitney, and Urho Saari's son Bob Saari. In their first game, the Americans lost to a strong, tall and dominant team from Yugoslavia 2-1, where water polo was a major sport. The U.S. team was tied 1-1 with the team from Yugoslavia throughout the first half, with the Yugoslavians not taking the winning shot until the last four minutes of play in the second half. In their second game, the American team defeated the team from Brazil 7-1, but were subsequently defeated 4-6 by the team from the Netherlands, losing their chance to advance to the semi-finals. In an unusual twist, in the losing game against the Netherlands American goalie Tony Van Dorp, played against his brother Fred van Dorp. Tony Van Dorp had played for the Dutch Team before coming to America and gaining citizenship in 1957. After semi-final play, pre-games favorite Hungary took the gold medal, Yugoslavia took the silver, and the Soviet Union took the bronze.

He married Karen Green on November 9, 1968 at St. David's Episcopal Church. Green was a UCLA honor graduate, where the couple met, and received a Masters from UCLA.

Drown stayed physically active and competed in Masters Water Polo. Around 2000, Drown lived in Hawaii where he competed in Body Surfing, and was active in the Olympians and Paralympians organization.

=== Careers ===
Drown worked summers during high school and college as a lifeguard. Subsequent to his Olympic competition, Drown attended and completed law school at the University of Southern California's Gould School of Law, completing a JD degree in 1968. He subsequently had a career as a Los Angeles area attorney. He spent some of his career as a Santa Barbara High School water polo coach, holding the position for a number of years. Around the age of 60, he ended his law career and began living in Hawaii.
