= Peter Stange =

American water polo player (born 1931)

Personal information
- Full name: Peter James Stange
- Nationality: USA
- Born: February 28, 1931 (age 95) Santa Monica, California, U.S.
- Occupation: Lifeguard
- Height: 5 ft 9 in (175 cm)
- Weight: 160 lb (73 kg)

Sport
- Sport: Water polo
- Position: Right forward (WP)
- College team: University of California Los Angeles
- Coached by: Urho Saari (El Segundo, Olympics); Brud Cleveland (UCLA)
Medal record
Representing United States
Pan American Games
Bronze medal – third place	1951 Buenos Aires	Men's tournament

Peter "Pete" James Stange (born February 28, 1931) is an American water polo player who competed for the University of California, Los Angeles and participated in the 1952 Summer Olympics in Helsinki.

Stange was born in Santa Monica, California on February 28, 1931. Graduating in 1948, Stange played water polo for El Segundo High School where he was managed and trained by Hall of Fame Coach Urho Saari.

== University of California Los Angeles ==
During his collegiate years, he swam and played water polo for the strong team at the University of California, Los Angeles, where he was coached by Brud Cleveland. Stange competed in the 50 and 100 yard freestyle events and competed in relays. Monte Nitzkowski, who would later coach the U.S. National team from 1972-1984, was one of Stange's team mates on the UCLA water polo and swim teams in 1950.

At the 1951 Pan American Games in Buenos Aires, Argentina, Stange was on the U.S. National team that won a bronze medal.

== 1952 Helsinki Olympics ==
Stange was a member of the American water polo team which finished fourth in the 1952 tournament. He played three matches. With a total of 21 countries participating, the 1952 Olympics featured more water polo team entries than any prior Olympics. Russia competed in Olympic water polo for the first time.

The U.S. water polo team was coached by Orho Saari, and featured John Curran of the New York Athletic Club as team manager. Saari, a USA Hall of Fame Member, had coached El Segundo High School and Swim Club, and would later chair the U.S. Water Polo Committee from 1957-1964. Hungary and Yugoslavia were strong favorites to medal and remained highly rated teams for decades. The 1952 Olympic team included goaltender Harry Bisbey, Ace Burns, Bob Hughes, Jaworski, team Captain Jim Norris, Bill Lake, Bob Kohler, Jack Spargo, Bill Kooistra, Bill Dorblaser, and Pete Stange. A new rule allowed movement after the referee called a foul, which sped up the game. Despite low initial expectations, the U.S. team defeated Spain, Belgium, Great Britain, and Austria in preliminary rounds, earning a spot in the semi-finals. Losing their chances at a gold or silver medal, they suffered a disappointing but close 5-4 loss to the Italian team in their first semi-final, and then lost to the Yugoslavian team 4-2 in their last semi-final round, ending their chances for a bronze medal. Hungary and Yugoslavia tied in the final gold medal match, but Hungary was given the gold medal as a result of goal differential, having scored more total goals in competition. Yugoslavia took the silver, and Italy took the bronze medal.

=== Career ===
In his professional life, he began working as a lifeguard in Los Angeles during his summers. The City of Los Angeles later hired him to work at the station at Willis Street. After establishing a career as a Los Angeles area lifeguard, he retired from Station 8 at Will Rogers State Beach.
