= Robert Hughes (swimmer) =

American swimmer (1930–2012)

Personal information
- Full name: Robert Earl Hughes
- National team: United States
- Born: December 15, 1930 Lennox, California
- Died: October 11, 2012 (aged 81) Arroyo, Grande, California
- Height: 6 ft 6 in (1.98 m)
- Weight: 225 lb (102 kg)

Sport
- Sport: Water Polo, Swimming
- Position: Water Polo Center Forward (WP)
- College team: El Camino College; University of Southern California
- Club: El Segundo Swim Club
- Coached by: Urho Saari (El Segundo, Camino); Fred Cady (USC)

Robert Earl Hughes (December 15, 1930 – October 11, 2012) was an American water polo player and breaststroke swimmer for the University of Southern California who competed in both the 1952 and 1956 Summer Olympics.

== El Segundo High School ==
Hughes was born in Lennox, California in December, 1930. He attended El Segundo High School and swam for their team under U.S. Water Polo Hall of Fame Coach Urho Saari, where in May, 1948, Hughes won the 50 and 100-yard freestyle to help lead his High School team to the CIF Team Championship. During Coach Saari's time as Head Coach, El Segundo High School won the Southern California Championship twelve times. In August, 1948, swimming for the El Segundo Swim Club, Hughes set a new SPAAU record for the 200-meter breaststroke at the Southern Pacific AAU (SPAAU) Senior Outdoor Swimming Championships, with a time of 50.7 seconds.

== El Camino College ==
After High School, he attended El Camino College in greater Los Angeles where he was again coached by Urho Saari in both swimming and water polo. At the Southern California small college water polo championship on December 3, 1948, Hughes scored seven goals leading El Camino College to a 13-8 victory over Loyola University in the final game. By November, 1948, Hughes, who was a top scorer in his position as Center Forward, had tried out for the 1948 Olympic team in St. Louis. During his 1949-50 swimming year at El Camino, Hughes was selected by the Junior College All America Swimming Board to receive All America honors from the Helms Athletic Foundation. He was recognized for his performances in the 50, 100, 220, and 440-yard freestyle, and the 100-yard breaststroke events.

=== U.S. Coast Guard Service ===
After his time with El Camino, he served during the Korean War era with the US Coast Guard. As a member of the Coast Guard on August 27–28, 1952 Hughes, and other U.S. Water Polo team members assisted California channel swimmer Ray Carmassi to complete the 21-mile channel swim from Catalina Island to San Pedro, California accompanied by a flotilla of auxiliary Coast Guard Vessels crewed by Coast Guard personnel. Hughes and 1952 Olympic teammate Harry Bisbey, took turns swimming with Carmassi.

== University of Southern California ==
After attending El Camino, and serving with the U.S. Coast Guard, Hughes attended the University of Southern California (USC), where he swam for the USC Trojans swimming and diving team from 1955-56 in National Collegiate Athletic Association (NCAA) competition under Head Coach Fred Cady and also played water polo. Cady was USC's first swim coach and served from 1920-1956, though he also excelled as a diving coach, coaching the US Olympic team divers for four consecutive Olympics beginning in 1928. Hughes continued to attend USC from 1954-1957, though he did not complete a degree. Hughes lettered in both swimming and water polo at USC, and earned All-American honors as a swimmer in both 1955 and 1956. By 1956, he held the USC school record for the 50 freestyle with a time of 22.8, and in the 100 freestyle with a time of 51.2. In the summer of 1955, while attending USC, Hughes served as a High School Teacher at St. Joseph High School in Alameda, California.

=== 1952 Olympic trials ===
Playing with the El Segundo team under Urho Saari, at the 1952 Olympic trials at New York's Astoria Pool, in early July, 1952, Hughes's El Segundo team defeated the "B Team" of the New York Athletic Club 15-2, then defeated the Fullerton-Whittier Team 6-5, and on July 3 defeated the strong New York Athletic Club's A-team 5-2, qualifying them to represent the U.S. at the 1952 Helsinki Olympics. In the close game with the highly favore Fullerton-Whittier team, Hughes's teammate Bill Dornblaser scored a late goal with only nineteen seconds left in regulation play, breaking a 5-5 tie, to win the game 6-5. With most of the El Segundo members selected to participate in the Helsinki Olympics, the El Segundo team had had to raise money to finance the trip to New York for the trials. Esther Williams helped host a fundraiser, and the local Standard Oil Company in El Segundo contributed to the effort as well.

In high level National and International competition, Hughes was on the American Athletic Union Sr. Outdoor National Championship Team in 1953, and in water polo was on the American 1951 Buenos Aires Pan American Team, taking a gold medal. He also competed with the 1955 US Mexico City Pan American Team taking a silver medal.

== 1952 Helsinki Olympics ==
Hughes was a member of the U.S. Olympic water polo team that exceeded early expectations and finished fourth in the 1952 Olympic tournament in Helsinki, Finland, just out of medal contention. He played in all nine matches for the U.S. team. Exceeding expectations in a strong field, the U.S. won nearly all their games in the preliminary rounds, and though they lost to Italy, they advanced to the semi-finals. The loss to Italy in the early rounds was disappointing, and many US members believed the officiating strongly favored Italy. In in the final water polo rounds in early August, 1952, the US team lost to Yugoslavia 4-2, and were shut out by Hungary 4-0, settling for a fourth place finish Pre-Olympic favorite Hungary took the gold medal, Yugoslavia took the silver, and Italy took the bronze. The American Water Polo team at the 1952 Olympics was coached by Hughes' former High School and Junior College Coach Urho Saari.

== 1956 Melbourne Olympics ==
Competing again four years later, he finished fifth with the American water polo team at the 1956 Summer Olympics in Melbourne, Australia, where he played in five matches and scored frequently. He also competed as the only U.S. entrant in the 200-meter breaststroke, but did not advance beyond the preliminary heats and placed sixth. On the U.S. Men's Olympic swim team, he was managed by U.S. Men's Olympic Head Coach Bob Muir, who had excelled in breaststroke in his youth, and was a long-serving coach for Williams College.

Benefitting from his earlier training in both water polo and swimming at USC, while at the 1956 Olympics, he became the first American athlete since Johnny Weissmuller in 1924 to compete in two different Olympic sports in one year. As a swimmer, in 1956, he broke the American world record in the 100-meter breaststroke with a 1:11.2. Hughes played the two-meter position also known as Center Forward at the Olympics, and in collegiate competition. His outstanding play at the position made it far better known to the public, as the Olympics garnered a large audience and wide press coverage. The two meter position is played on offense and is also known as the Hole set or hole, which is usually in the area of the two meter (2M) marker in the center of the opposing team's goal, making it an excellent spot for scoring. Hughes's height may have been used to its best advantage in this position as he was harder to block and could shoot and receive passes above the heads' of opponents.

== Later life careers ==
Hughes later worked as a coach, school teacher and artist, specializing as a sculptor. He continued to play water polo with the El Segundo Athletic club through the 1960's, with a water polo career spanning from 1948-1963. In 1974, he was Assistant Coach for Arroyo Grande High School, and served as an Assistant Water Polo coach from 1970-74 at his alma mater, the University of Southern California.

== Honors ==
He was inducted into the USA Water Polo Hall of Fame in 1976 as a Charter Member. The recipient of many honors, Hughes was also a member of the El Camino College Hall of Fame, the California Community College Coaches Hall of Fame, the United States Swimming Hall of Fame and the USC Hall of Fame.

As an outstanding athlete, Hughes was an AAU All American in 1953, 1956, and 1963. He was an All Pacific 8 Conference Champion in 1954, 1955, and 1956 with the University of Southern California.

Hughes died October 11, 2012 in Arroyo, Grande, California, though few obituaries were published to verify his passing.

== See also ==
- List of multi-sport athletes
- List of University of Southern California people
- Water polo at the 1952 Summer Olympics – Men's team squads
- Water polo at the 1956 Summer Olympics – Men's team squads
