= James Norris (water polo) =

American water polo player (1930–2021)

Personal information
- Born: July 7, 1930 Salt Lake City, Utah, United States
- Died: June 3, 2021 (aged 90) Jackson, California, United States
- Spouse: Lynne Oldman (1951)
- Children: 4

Sport
- Sport: Swimming, Water Polo
- Position: Guard (WP)
- College team: University of Southern California
- Club: El Segundo Swim Club
- Coached by: Urho Saari (El Segundo, Olympics); Peter Daland, Neal Cohase (USC)
Medal record
Representing United States
Pan American Games
Bronze medal – third place	1951 Buenos Aires	Men's tournament

James "Jim" Leo Norris (July 7, 1930 – June 3, 2021) was an American swimmer and water polo player who competed in swimming for the University of Southern California and participated in water polo in the 1952 Summer Olympics. After his elite athletic career, he worked as a lifeguard, coached high school, and served as a Counselor at El Camino College. In retirement from El Camino, he and his wife Lynne relocated to the Santa Ynez Valley, and founded Olive Press Publications.

Norris was born July 7, 1930 in Salt Lake City, Utah to Leo and Erma Davis Norris. After his family moved to California in the early 1940's, he attended El Segundo High School where he swam and played water polo for Coach Urho Saari, frequently playing as a guard. An exceptional team, El Segundo High's water polo team under Urho Saari won their first CIF championship around 1947, and competed in the Pan American games in Buenos Aires in 1948. After High School graduation, Norris continued to play intermittently for Saari's El Segundo Water Polo Club.

== University of Southern California ==
He attended the University of Southern California on an ROTC scholarship where he competed and trained in swimming under International Swimming Hall of Fame Coach, and USC Head Coach Peter Daland. Norris graduated USC with a degree in Zoology. USC's water polo team was coached for a period by Neal Colhase and Urho Saari.

In international competition in 1951, Norris won a team bronze medal in water polo at the Pan American Games in Buenos Aires, Argentina.

== 1952 Helsinki Olympics ==
Norris served as Captain of the American water polo team which finished fourth in the 1952 Helsinki Olympic tournament. He played eight matches, competing under the training and direction of Head U.S. water polo coach Urho Saari, his former coach at El Segundo, and a USA Water Polo Hall of Fame inductee. Exceeding expectations in a strong field, the U.S. won nearly all their games in the preliminary rounds, and though they lost to Italy, they advanced to the semi-finals. The loss to Italy in the early rounds was disappointing, and many US members believed the officiating strongly favored Italy. In in the final water polo rounds in early August, 1952, the US team lost to Yugoslavia 4-2, and were shut out by Hungary 4-0, settling for a fourth place finish. Traditionally dominant Hungary took the gold medal, the equally dominant team from Yugoslavia took the silver, and Italy took the bronze.

=== Naval service ===
After college graduation, Norris enlisted in the Navy where he was an Athletic director and Officer in charge of gunnery on the U.S.S. Los Angeles, serving around three years. After his naval service, he received his teaching certificate from the University of Southern California Los Angeles, and later earned a Masters in Counseling from California State University Los Angeles.

He married Lynne Oldman on April 26 1951, having met at El Segundo High School. The couple eventually had four children.

=== Careers ===
In the 1950's, he served as a Lifeguard in greater Los Angeles, a job to which he would occasionally return. He coached and taught High School in California's South Bay area, later taking a position Counseling at El Camino College until his retirement from that role in 1981. Active in community service, Norris chaired El Segundo High's faculty association, and at El Damino college where he worked. Active as well in the California Community College Association, her served as President. After retiring from El Camino College, Norris moved to Santa Ynez Valley and founded Olive Press Publications with his wife Lynne, where the couple were responsible for the publication of over 60 books.

He later moved to the city of Jackson, California around 2008 where he spent time reading and researching, and demonstrated a particular interest in flora and fauna. Norris died on June 3, 2021 at the age of 90 in Jackson, California and was survived by four children. He was married to his wife Lynne for over 70 years.
