= Harry Bisbey =

American water polo player (1931–1992)

- A youthful Harry A. Bisbey, circa 1955, around age 24

Personal information
- Full name: Harry Arthur Bisbey
- Born: May 10, 1931 Santa Monica, California, US
- Died: May 4, 1992 (aged 60) Los Angeles, California
- Occupations: lifeguard Real Estate assessor
- Spouse: Joyce

Sport
- Sport: Water polo
- Position: Goalkeeper (52 Olympics)
- College team: El Camino College; U. Southern California
- Club: El Segundo Swim Club; U.S. National Water Polo team
- Coached by: Urho Saari (El Segundo, Olympics)
Medal record
Representing United States
Pan American Games
| Bronze medal – third place | 1951 Buenos Aires | Men's tournament |

Harry Arthur Bisbey (May 10, 1931 – May 4, 1992) was an American water polo player who competed as a goalkeeper in the 1952 Summer Olympics in Finland where the U.S. team exceeded early expectations and finished fourth overall. He worked as a lifeguard during his early life, and later had a career as a tax assessor for greater Los Angeles.

Bisbey was born on May 10, 1931 in Santa Monica, California, to father Harry Selden Bisby, and mother Margaret I. Bisbey, one of around two children. Harry's father had a professional career as a Draftsman at Standard Oil Refinery. Growing up in the Hermosa Beach area, Harry graduated from El Segundo High School around 1949, where he was coached in swimming and water polo by Water Polo Hall of Fame Coach Urho Saari. In 1948, Harry was part of El Segundo High School's water polo team championship.

== College ==
He studied initially at El Camino College where he played water polo and swam under former Coach Urho Saari, then transferred to the University of Southern California. Bisby received All American water polo honors in 1951, 1952, and 1953, though he may have competed exclusively with the U.S. National team and the El Segundo Swim Club during this time. Bisbey was an All Pacific Eight Conference honoree in 1952, 1953, and 1954 which may indicate he competed for USC at least for one year.

=== Coast Guard service ===
He enlisted in the United States Coast Guard by 1952, serving as an electronics technician third class and was in the Guard during the 1952 Olympics. As part of the U.S. Olympic team and Coast Guard Auxiliary, Bisbey helped pace distance swimmer and former Marine swimming instructor Ray Carmassi during his swim from Catalina Island to greater San Pedro, California, a roughly 21 mile distance, which he completed in around 13 hours on August 28, 1952. Also pacing Carmassi was fellow Coast Guard member and fellow 1952 Olympic water polo team mate Bob Hughes, who was an Athlete of the Year in 1949 at El Camino College. Carmassi completed the swim, but not in record time.

=== 1952 Olympic trials in New York ===
Playing with the El Segundo team under Urho Saari, at the 1952 Olympic trials at New York's Astoria Pool, in early July, 1952, Bisbey's El Segundo team defeated the "B Team" of the New York Athletic Club 15-2, then defeated the Fullerton-Whittier Team 6-5, and on July 3 defeated the strong New York Athletic Club's A-team 5-2, qualifying them to represent the U.S. at the 1952 Helsinki Olympics. Bisbey had planned to later tryout in the 200-meter breaststroke at Flushing Meadow Amphitheatre, though his qualification in water polo may have disqualified from competing in a swimming event.

== 1952 Helsinki Olympics ==
Bisbey was a member of the American water polo team which finished fourth in the 1952 tournament in Helsinki, Finland, under Head Coach Urho Saari. Several of the 1952 team had played for Saari at El Segundo High School, and the majority had trained with Saari at the El Segundo Swim Club in preparation for the Olympics. Bisbey received the honor of being named FINA's 1952 Outstanding Goalie of the Olympic Games. Bisbey played all nine matches as goalkeeper.

In international competition outside the Olympics, Bisbey was part of the U.S. National water polo team that won a bronze at the 1951 Pan American Games, and was again on the U.S. National team that won a silver at the 1955 Pan American games.

In an Las Vegas elopement at the age of 23, Bisbey was married to 19-year-old actress Janet Mala on October 21, 1954, who jeopardized her movie contract with RKO my marrying without permission. The couple was divorced by 1960, though they were raising two young children. Harry had a lengthy marriage to his second wife Joyce, who survived him.

=== Honors ===
In 1980, he was inducted into the USA Water Polo Hall of Fame. He was the only American to be recognized as a member of the 1952 All-Star Olympic water polo team. He was voted a 1952 Helsinki Olympic Outstanding Goalie by FINA and in the same year was made a member of the All World Team.

=== Later life ===
He worked as a lifeguard in his early career, and in a late career, while living in Woodland Hills, served as an appraiser of real estate for the Office of Tax Assessor of Los Angeles County.

Bisbey died at the age of 60 on May 4, 1992, while living in Woodland Hills, and was buried in Oakwood Memorial Park. He was survived by his wife Joyce E. Bisby.

== See also ==
- List of men's Olympic water polo tournament goalkeepers
