= Water polo at the 1951 Pan American Games =

Water polo was contested for men only at the 1951 Pan American Games in Buenos Aires, Argentina.

== Competing teams ==
Five teams contested the event.

- Argentina
- Brazil
- Chile
- Mexico
- United States

== Medalists ==
Event	Gold	Silver	Bronze
Men's water polo	Argentina (ARG)	Brazil (BRA); Alfonso Zaparoli; Armando Caropresco; Claudino de Castro; Edson Perri; Guilherme Schall; Isaac Moraes; João Havelange; Leo Rossi; Luiz Antônio dos Santos; Milton Busin; Nelson Brescia; Samuel Schemberg; Saverio Gregorut	United States (USA); Marvin Burns; Harry Bisbey; Norman Dornblaser; Robert Hughes; Norman Lake; James Norris; Bruce O'Brien; John Spargo; Peter Stange; William Zerkie
