= António Reymão Nogueira =

Portuguese equestrian

Personal information
- Nationality: Portuguese
- Born: 6 November 1909; Lisbon, Portugal
- Died: 9 June 1987 (aged 77)

Sport
- Sport: Equestrian

António Reymão Nogueira (6 November 1909 – 9 June 1987) was a Portuguese equestrian. He competed at the 1952 Summer Olympics and the 1960 Summer Olympics.
