= Leo Rossi (water polo) =

Brazilian water polo player 1927–2011

Personal information
- Nationality: Brazilian
- Born: 15 July 1927
- Died: 21 May 2011 (aged 83) Barra da Tijuca, Brazil

Sport
- Sport: Water polo
Medal record
Representing Brazil
Pan American Games
Silver medal – second place	1951 Buenos Aires	Men's tournament

Leo Rossi (15 July 1927 – 21 May 2011) was a Brazilian water polo player. He competed in the men's tournament at the 1952 Summer Olympics.
