= José Luis López de Lacalle =

Spanish journalist (1938–2000)

José Luis López de Lacalle Arnal
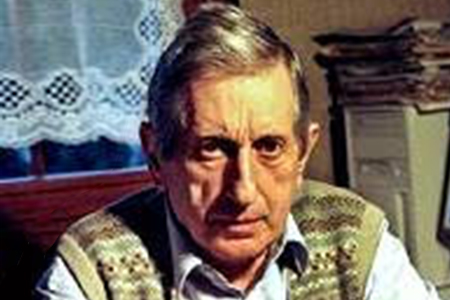
- Born: 1938; Tolosa, Gipuzkoa
- Died: 7 May 2000 (aged 61–62); Andoain
- Occupations: journalist and trade unionist

José Luis López de Lacalle Arnal (1938 – 7 May 2000) was a Spanish journalist and trade unionist. A columnist for El Mundo newspaper, he was killed by ETA.

== Biography ==
López de Lacalle was born during the Spanish Civil War in a family living in the periphery of Tolosa, Gipuzkoa, in the Basque Country. At a young age started working in the paper industry.

Despite having little formal education he became a voracious reader thanks to the company of a group of Basque intellectuals. He was a friend of Enrique Múgica Herzog (later Spanish Ministry of Justice), who introduced him to the Communist Party of Spain at the end of the 1950s.

On 23 August 1966, during the dictatorship of Francisco Franco, he was arrested with the accusation of "illegal association". He spent five years in the Carabanchel Prison.

After the Spanish transition he was a leading negotiator for the workers' commission and the general manager of the Ugarola industrial co-operative. He left the Communist Party and approached the Socialist Party of the Basque Country. He ran unsuccessfully for the Senate of Spain as an independent. He was always critical of Basque nationalism, violence and terrorism of ETA.

He retired early and became a columnist for El Mundo.

After ETA killed Miguel Ángel Blanco he participated in 1998 to the creation of the civil association Foro Ermua.

=== Threats and killing ===
López de Lacalle argued that life of citizens, politicians and journalists in the Basque County was always under the threat of terrorism. He himself was threatened many times and his house was hit by Molotov cocktails.

On 7 May 2000 at 9.45 am, while he was going back home after buying newspapers and having breakfast, two members of ETA who were waiting for him near his home shot him four times in the chest and at the head, killing him.

Funerals were held on 9 May in the church of Saint Martin in Andoain, in the outskirts of San Sebastián. 2,000 people participated.

=== Protests against ETA ===
After his death thousands of people protested against ETA and more than one hundred directors of news outlets signed a manifesto called "No nos callarán" (They will not shut us up), condemning ETA violence. The following year Reporters Without Borders asked the European Parliament to pass a resolution confirming the resolution of the European Union against terrorism in the Basque County. According to RSF more than 100 journalists were being threatened by the ETA.

=== Investigation and arrests ===
On 11 December 2002 José Ignacio Guridi Lasa was sentenced to 30 years' imprisonment as the material executor of the killing. In 2009 Javier García Gaztelu, alias Txapote, was condemned for having ordered the killing. The same year Asier Arzallus, who is accused of having participated in the killing, was transferred from France to Spain.
