= Helena Corrêa de Barros =

Portuguese photographer (1910–2000)

- Born: Helena Abecassis; 25 February 1910; Lisbon, Portugal
- Died: 26 May 2000 (aged 90)
- Known for: Photography

Helena Corrêa de Barros (Lisbon, 25 February 1910 – 26 May 2000) was a Portuguese amateur photographer.

== Personal life ==
Born in Lisbon on 25 February 1910, she was the daughter of businessman Fortunato Carlos Bensaude Abecassis (who ran several companies such as Abecassis, Lusalite, and the insurance company Mundia) and of Sofia Amzalak Buzaglo Abecassis. She married Eduardo Corrêa de Barros and had four children.

== Photography work ==
Helena Corrêa de Barros was an amateur photographer all her life and participated in exhibitions and photo-competitions in Portugal and abroad, having received some awards.

Barros started photographing in 1924, at age 14. Her father made and collected stereo lantern slides that might have been influential in her later practice of photographing with color slides. Her photography themes were country and maritime landscapes, rural and urban life, as well as some more abstract images, family photographs and travel. From 1947 to 1999, Barros used color slides in most of her photography work, namely kodachrome, which she began using in 1947.

In 2003, her family donated her collection to Lisbon's City Hall (Câmara Municipal de Lisboa).

== Exhibitions ==
- 19 October 2018 to 23 February 2019, "Fotografia, a minha viagem preferida" (tr. "Photography, my favorite journey"), Lisbon City Hall (Arquivo Municipal de Lisboa)

== See also ==
- Vicente, Filipa Lowndes. 2018."Photography as autobiography: Helena Corrêa de Barros, a woman photographer” in Helena Corrêa de Barros: Fotografia, a minha viagem preferida. Lisboa: CML-DAM, 2018, pp. 187–197
