= Gerry Worsell =

British water polo player

Personal information
- Nationality: British
- Born: 1 May 1930 (age 95) Lambeth, England

Sport
- Sport: Water polo

Gerry Worsell (born 1 May 1930) is a British water polo player. He competed at the 1952 Summer Olympics and the 1956 Summer Olympics.
