= Marcel Heyninck =

Belgian water polo player (1931–2013)

Personal information
- Nationality: Belgian
- Born: 9 March 1931; Antwerp, Belgium
- Died: 17 September 2013 (aged 82); Antwerp, Belgium

Sport
- Sport: Water polo

Marcel Heyninck (9 March 1931 – 17 September 2013) was a Belgian water polo player. He competed in the men's tournament at the 1952 Summer Olympics. Heyninck died in Antwerp in 2013, at the age of 82.
