= Rui Maia =

Portuguese sprinter

Personal information
- Nationality: Portuguese
- Born: 23 December 1925
- Died: 2 March 2012 (aged 86)

Sport
- Sport: Sprinting
- Event: 100 metres

Rui Maia (23 December 1925 – 2 March 2012) was a Portuguese sprinter. He competed in the men's 100 metres at the 1952 Summer Olympics.
