= Philipp Dotzer =

German water polo player (born 1926)

Personal information
- Nationality: German
- Born: 5 August 1926; Nuremberg, Germany

Sport
- Sport: Water polo

Philipp Dotzer (born 5 August 1926) was a German water polo player. He competed in the men's tournament at the 1952 Summer Olympics.
