= Ran Chandnani =

Indian water polo player

Personal information
- Nationality: Indian
- Born: 1930 (age 94–95)

Sport
- Sport: Water polo

Ran Chandnani (born 1930) is an Indian water polo player. He competed in the men's tournament at the 1952 Summer Olympics.
