= Bob Challis =

England international rugby union player

- Full name: Robert Challis
- Born: 9 March 1932 Long Ashton, Somerset, England
- Died: 12 May 2000 (aged 68) North Somerset, England
- School: Bristol Cathedral School

Rugby union career
- Position: Fullback
International career
Years	Team	Apps	(Points)
1957	England	3	(10)

Robert Challis (9 March 1932 – 12 May 2000) was an English international rugby union player.

Born in Long Ashton, Somerset, Challis was educated at Bristol Cathedral School.

Challis was an England Schoolboys representative player as a centre, but had become a fullback by the time he joined Bristol in the 1952–53 season. He represented Western Counties against the touring All Blacks in 1953.

In 1957, Challis was fullback in three matches for England in their grand slam-winning Five Nations campaign and contributed 10 points off his boot, having replaced an injured Fenwick Allison after the first fixture.

== See also ==
- List of England national rugby union players
