= Urho Saari =

American swimming and water polo coach

Urho Eino Saari
- Saari circa 1930, age 17 while in High School

Biographical details
- Born: November 17, 1912; Buffalo, New York
- Died: November 29, 1990 (aged 78); Camarillo, California
- Height: 5 ft 11 in (180 cm)
- Weight: 168 lb (76 kg)
- Education: Buffalo State University (1939)

Playing career
- 1935-1939: Buffalo State University
- 1944-1946: U.S. Army (Water Polo)
- Positions: Swimming (Buffalo); Student Coach (Buffalo)

Coaching career (HC unless noted)
- 1942-1978: El Segundo High School; Swim and W. P. Coach
- 1948-1955: El Camino College
- 1952, '60, '64: U.S. Olympic WP Teams; Head/Asst. Coach

Accomplishments and honors

Championships
- 6 CIF Swimming Championships; 12 CIF WP Championships; Bronze medal, 1951 Pan American Games

Awards
- Water Polo Coach of the Year 1964-65; USA WP Hall of Fame (1966); Buffalo State Hall of Fame (1985)

Urho Eino Saari (November 17, 1912 – November 29, 1990) was an American swimming and water polo coach best known for leading his teams at El Segundo High School from 1942–1978 to eighteen California Interscholastic Federation Championships, with six in swimming and twelve in water polo. He served as the Head U.S. Water Polo Coach for the Pan American Games in 1951 where the U.S. captured a bronze medal, and as the Head U.S. water polo coach at the Olympics in 1952 in Helsinki and in 1964 in Tokyo. Making a mark in advancing American aquatic competition on the international stage, thirty-three of his El Segundo players qualified for U.S. Olympic teams. In service to the community, he chaired the Olympic Water Polo Committee for two terms from 1957 to 1964.

== Early life ==
Of Finnish descent, Saari was born November 17, 1912, in Buffalo, New York, to mother Olga and father Oscar Saari. Saari claimed to have first started swimming at Buffalo's Public School 13, whose basement housed a 20-yard pool, a common distance at the time. By 17, he was a recognized Buffalo area swimmer, competing for Buffalo's Hutchinson Central High School, where the Buffalo News granted him First Team All High School Honors in the 400, and the 160-yard freestyle events. By his Senior year, Saari served as a Hutchinson swim team captain, and later held a district breaststroke championship by 1934.

Prior to college, Saari also competed for the greater Buffalo area's Central YMCA. With his height and strength likely contributing to his athletic ability, at 17 Saari was 5 feet 11 inches tall and weighed 168 pounds. Prior to his time in college, his career included working as a lifeguard at Erie Beach in August 1934, and earlier at the West Wellesville Swimming pool.

== Buffalo State University ==
Graduating in 1939, Saari attended Buffalo State University, then known as State Teacher's College at Buffalo from 1935 to 1939 where he swam with Buffalo's Varsity swimming team, that also featured a men's water polo team. While at Buffalo State, he continued to compete in freestyle swimming events but also adopted the new overhand breaststroke technique and later excelled in the stroke. While swimming for Buffalo State, Saari competed in freestyle events and relays particularly as a Freshman, as well as breaststroke and medley events in later years where he occasionally won and placed second in events. He served as a student coach of the Buffalo team by his Sophomore year in December, 1936.

=== Marriage ===
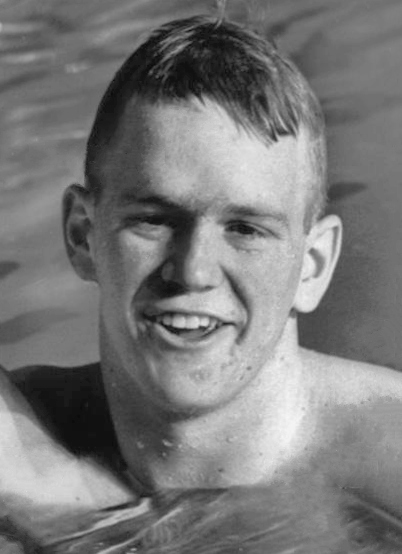
Son Roy Saari, circa '63

At 22 Saari married Wanda Carroll, a former breaststroke swimmer from rival Lafayette High who had won a breaststroke district championship, and competed for the Buffalo Women's Aquatic Club. The couple met at Buffalo's Downtown YMCA where Saari had coached, and married July 26, 1934 at Richmond Methodist Episcopal Church in greater Buffalo. They eventually had three children which included 1964 U.S. Olympic medalist Roy Saari, and 1964 U.S. Olympian in water polo Bob Saari. Saari's daughter Carol swam for El Segundo High and the University of California Santa Barbara.

=== WWII Army service ===
Interrupting his time as an El Segundo teacher and coach, Saari served in the U.S. Army during the Second World War from around 1944–1946. During his service, he coached water polo for the U.S. military team in Calcutta, India, and may have occasionally served as a player. He organized the team himself, which competed primarily against British and Indian teams.

== Coaching ==
In 1939, after graduating Buffalo College, Saari and his family relocated to greater Los Angeles and he did graduate work at UCLA with a focus on English. He coached water polo and swimming at California's El Segundo High School. During his lengthy career with the High School between 1940 and 1978, where he also taught courses, he led El Segundo High to a total of eighteen CIF Championships, which included twelve in water polo and six in swimming. The team won its first championship in 1947, and had won four consecutive CIF championships by 1954. He also coached El Segundo Swim Club during this period.

From 1948 to 1955, in addition to coaching at El Segundo High, Saari coached water polo at El Camino Junior College in Torrance, California in Greater Los Angeles. A strong regional team, in May 1952 El Camino placed a close second to Fullerton College in the California State Junior College Swimming Championships.

=== Coaching techniques ===
Saari's coaching emphasis focused on fast swimming and deft handling of the ball. He coached so that more goals would come from peripheral players rather than having scoring highly dependent on the "hole-man" or the person playing center position. As a former high school and collegiate multi-stroke swimmer, he had the skills to improve his player's swim speed, particularly as he had formerly competed and excelled in the forward strokes of freestyle and breaststroke. He had his water polo teams practice occasional interval swimming to improve their speed and stroke efficiency. He coached fast swimming to facilitate "fast-breaks", or rapid transitions from offense to defense or defense to offense where his teams would need to swim the length of the pool to their opponent's opposite goals.

== U.S. Olympic team coach ==
Saari coached the U.S. team at the 1951 Pan American Games that was composed of current and former El Segundo High School players.

=== 1952 Helsinki Olympic coach ===
Saari coached the U.S. Water Polo team at the 1952 Summer Olympics in Helsinki, Finland. Saari was particularly pleased to have Finland as his first Olympic coaching experience as he was familiar with the culture and could speak the language. The dominant teams from Hungary, Yugoslavia, and the teams from Italy, and the United States made it to the final matches. Demonstrating their dominance, Yugoslavia and Hungary won their preliminary matches. Hungary and Yugoslavia had tied in the semi-finals, and as each had the same records by the final round of 2 wins and a tie, Hungary was awarded the gold medal having scored more total goals in competition, with Yugoslavia taking the silver. In many future Olympics, Hungary and Yugoslavia would again be the first and second ranked global powers going into the Olympics. The Americans placed fourth overall in a stronger finish then expected before the games. Saari had coached several members of the U.S. team at El Segundo High School including Bill Dornblaser and Bob Hughes.

=== 1960 Rome Olympic coach ===
He served as an Assistant Coach and manager for the 1960 Rome Olympics, where the U.S. team placed seventh, Italy took the gold medal, the Soviet Union took the silver, and Hungary took the bronze.

=== 1964 Tokyo Olympic coach ===
He was Head U.S. Coach at the 1964 Tokyo Olympics, where the U.S. team ended the competition tied for ninth place. In their first game, the Americans lost to a strong, tall and dominant team from Yugoslavia 2–1, where water polo was a major sport. The U.S. team was tied 1–1 with the team from Yugoslavia throughout the first half, with the Yugoslavians not taking the winning shot until the last four minutes of play in the second half. In their second game, the American team defeated the team from Brazil 7–1, but were subsequently defeated by the team from the Netherlands by a score of 4–6, losing their chance to advance to the semi-finals. After semi-final play, pre-games favorite Hungary took the gold medal, Yugoslavia took the silver, and the Soviet Union took the bronze.

In 1965, Saari coached the U.S. water polo team at the Maccabiah Games in Tel Aviv, Israel.

In U.S. Water polo administration, in the late 1950s through 1962, Saari Chaired the AAU Water Polo Committee. He served two terms as a Chair of America's Olympic Water Polo serving consecutively from 1957 through 1964.

=== Better known swimmers and players ===
Outstanding swimmers and water polo players who he coached at El Segundo High School included 1952 Olympian James Norris, 1964 water polo Olympian Ned McIlroy, 1952 Olympian Bill Dornblaser, Chick McIlroy, 1964 water polo Olympian Dan Drown, and 1952 and 1956 Olympian Robert Hughes (swimmer). Norris and his wife Lynn would write a comprehensive biography of Saari, Urho Saari Olympian in 1988.

=== Later years ===
Around 1977–8, Saari retired from coaching and moved to Camarillo's Leisure Village retirement community, where he and his wife played tennis, golfed, and danced. By the mid-1980's, he was withdrawn and likely suffering from early signs of Alzheimers.

Saari died November 29, 1990, at the Veterans' Administration Nursing Home in Camarillo, California at the age of 78, having suffered from Alzheimers for several years, and was survived by two sons, his wife Wanda, a daughter, and five grandchildren.

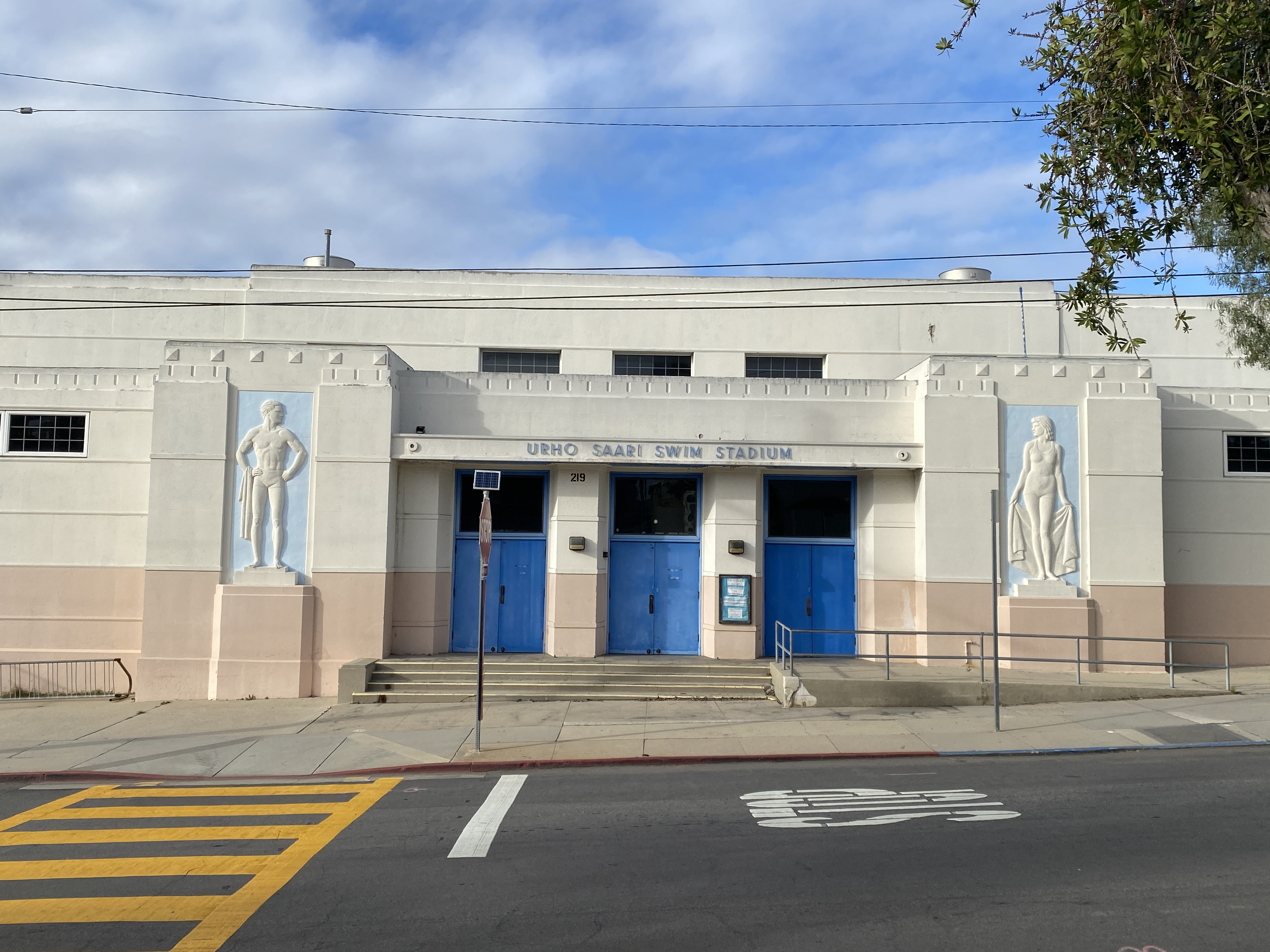
Saari Swim Stadium, El Segundo

=== Honors ===
Saari was inducted into the USA Water Polo Hall of Fame in 1976, and the Buffalo State Bengals Hall of Fame in 1985. The pool on Mariposa Avenue in El Segundo originally completed in 1943, was later named the Urho Saari Swim Stadium in his honor in May 1973.

=== See also ===
- Water polo at the 1951 Pan American Games

=== Further reading ===
- Norris, James and Norris, Lynne, Urho Saari, Olympian, 1988
