= Vernon Crompton Woodward =

Canadian flying ace (1916–2000)

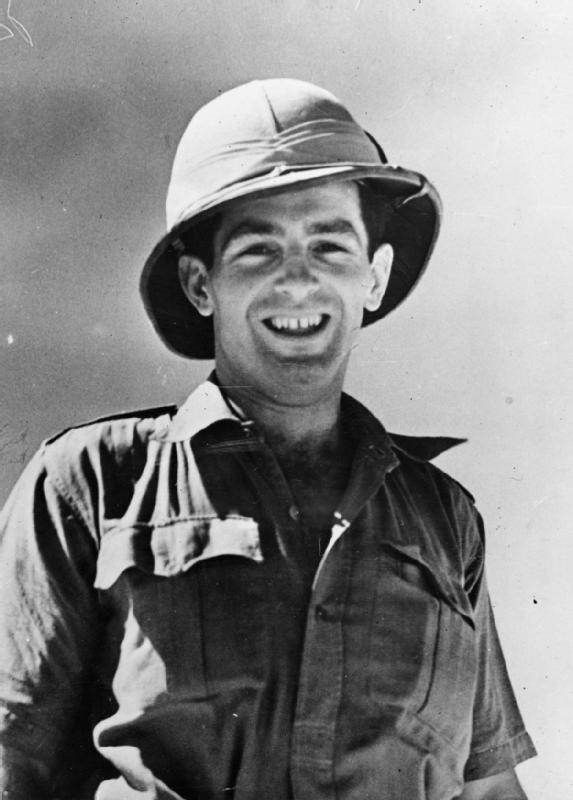
- Born: 22 December 1916; Victoria, British Columbia, Canada
- Died: 26 May 2000 (aged 83); Victoria, British Columbia, Canada
- Military career
- Allegiance: United Kingdom
- Branch: Royal Air Force
- Service years: 1938–1963
- Rank: Wing Commander
- Commands: No. 213 Squadron; Mediterranean Middle East Communications Squadron; No. 19 Squadron; No. 69 (PR) Squadron
- Conflicts: Second World War: Western Desert campaign; Battle of Crete; Cold War
- Awards: Distinguished Flying Cross; Mentioned in Despatches and Bar

Vernon Crompton "Woody" Woodward DFC and Bar RAF (22 December 1916 – 26 May 2000) was a Canadian fighter pilot and flying ace with the Royal Air Force during World War II. With 18 and 4 shared destroyed, 2 unconfirmed destroyed, 3 probables, and 11 damaged, Woodward tied Henry Wallace McLeod as Canada's second highest scoring pilot of the war.

== Biography ==
Woodward was born in Victoria, British Columbia on 22 December 1916. The oldest of three children, his father operated a market garden in Vancouver. As a child, Woodward was interested in hunting and owned a .30-.30 rifle. Woodward was unable to join the RCAF as he did not have a degree. He sailed for the UK in 1938 and resided in Gloucestershire farming. After attending the Civil Flying School in Perth, Scotland by August 1938 he was accepted on a short service commission in the RAF as an Acting Pilot Officer. In September 1938 he attended 6 FTS at Little Rissington.

Woodward was posted to No. 33 Squadron RAF in Egypt in May 1939. He became a Flying Officer in September. Following Italy's entry into the war in June 1940, he achieved early successes in Libya during June–July 1940.

He gained more success during December, by which time the squadron had re-equipped with Hawker Hurricanes. Late in February 1941 the squadron moved to Greece. On 9 May, he was decorated with the Distinguished Flying Cross.

Late in April, Woodward was ordered to Egypt to bring back a reinforcement Hurricane. He rejoined the Squadron, now in Crete, in May 1941 as a flight commander. The unit personnel retreated on foot across the island after the German invasion, and were evacuated on a Royal Navy destroyer later in the month.

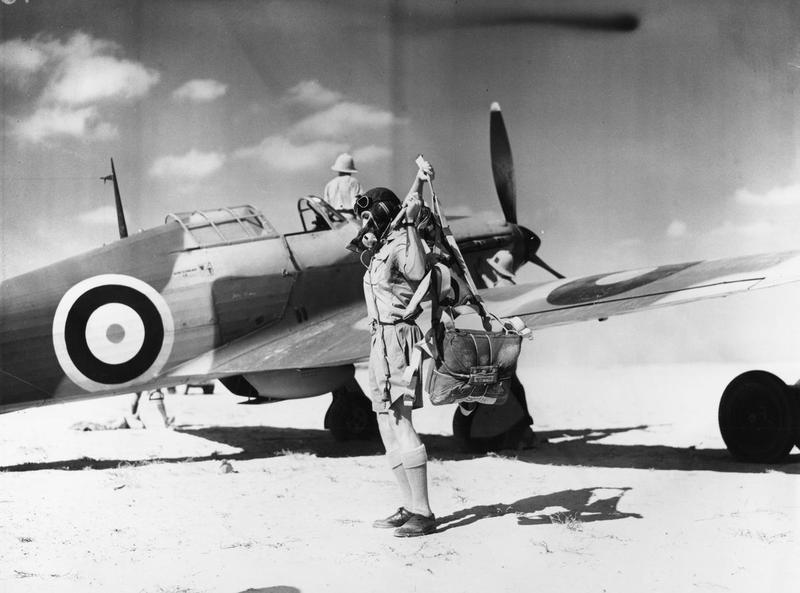
Woodward beside his Hawker Hurricane fighter, at Fuka, Egypt

The squadron reformed in June and was back in action, supporting Operation Battleaxe, with a flight of experienced pilots from 33 Squadron led by Woodward attached to No. 274 Squadron.

On 11 September, his tour expired and he was sent to Rhodesia to become instructor at 20 SFTS, Cranbourne, Salisbury until June 1942, when he was posted to the Training Group HQ in Salisbury on Air Staff duties.

On 2 July 1942 Woodward was promoted to Squadron Leader, and in January 1943 he returned to Egypt to command No. 213 Squadron until August 1943. A Bar to his DFC was awarded on 6 August 1943.

After he went to AHQ, Levant, before attending the Middle East Staff College, Haifa in September. In December he was posted to HQ, Middle East on staff duties, and promoted to Wing Commander in June 1944.

In February 1945 he took command of the Mediterranean Middle East Communications Squadron, flying various transport aircraft.

In December 1946 he returned to the UK, going to the Visual Interservice Training and Research Establishment as Chief Ground Instructor.

In 1947 he joined CFE as SASO, and in August commanded No. 19 Squadron until March 1950. He then was posted to HQ, Fighter Command, in September 1950. Various peace time posts followed, until following a difference of opinion with a superior, he was moved to command No. 69 (PR) Squadron on Canberras in 1958. He remained with this unit until October 1959, when he went to the Ministry of Aviation, Controller of Aircraft, as SAdO.

He retired in January 1963 and settled in Australia, where he formed an air charter company.

In August 1967 he returned to British Columbia in retirement as a member of the Corps of Commissionaires.

== Bibliography ==
- McCaffery, Dan. Air Aces: The Lives and Times of Twelve Canadian Fighter Pilots. ISBN 1-55028-321-9
