= Ibrahim Akasha =

Kenyan drug lord

Ibrahim Abdalla Akasha (Died May 3, 2000) (not to be confused with his son of the same name) was a Kenyan drug lord and patriarch of the Akasha crime family. He was of Sudanese origin. His empire spanned Africa, the Middle East and Europe. He ran his empire from the Kenyan port city of Mombasa. He was shot dead by a lone gunman in Bloedstraat, Amsterdam on 3 May 2000. His sons Baktash and Ibrahim are convicted drug dealers who are currently serving jail terms in the United States.

== Biography ==
Akasha’s father, Abdallah Ibrahim, is said to have moved to Kenya from Ethiopia or Sudan after spending most of his life in Iraq. Akasha grew up in Mombasa and not much is known about his childhood. He was mainly involved in the transport business. His company, Akasha Transporters, however, struggled in the 1980s. At one point, he was involved in the management of Kenya National Taxi Corporation.

It was through his connections and experience in the transport industry that he would carve out a name for himself as the most powerful drug lord in the East African region. He mainly served as a middleman between Pakistani heroin suppliers on one side and Dutch and Yugoslav gangs on the other, with his base in Mombasa serving as a major town in the smuggling route.

After he was arrested in 2016, his son Baktash, in a series of letters to judge Victor Marrero through his lawyer George Goltzer, would describe Akasha as a violent alcoholic who was feared by the whole family and was abusive to his wives.

== Arrests and convictions ==
While his crime activities in the region went unnoticed for most of the late 1980s and early 1990s, his luck ran out in the mid-1990s. In 1997, his son Hassan was jailed in Tanzania after being convicted of smuggling mandrax. A year later, another of his sons, Yusuf Abdallah, was arrested in Kenya for sneaking in drugs in a container declared to be carrying drinking straws and bath towels. These convictions brought the otherwise unknown and media-shy Akasha to the limelight.

== Death ==
In 2000, Akasha travelled to The Netherlands to flee from Kenya police who had issued a warrant for his arrest. He had also gone to seek medical attention for his failing health and settle a business deal with his Dutch associate. Akasha had sold a consignment of drugs to Dutch drug lord Sam Klepper who refused to pay. Klepper then turned it over to a Mounir Barsoum. Prior to travelling to The Netherlands, Akasha kidnapped the Yugoslav conduit who had connected him to Klepper and demanded $2.5 million from the Dutchman. Barsoum’s elder brother, Magdi Barsoum, had organized a meeting between Akasha and the younger Barsoum in his coffee shop in Amsterdam for which he was to act as a mediator between the two.

While walking along Bloedstraat to the meeting on 3 May 2000 with his Egyptian wife Gazi Hyat, a lone gunman shot at Akasha seven times killing him on the spot.

== Legacy ==
After his death, his sons Baktash and Ibrahim carried on with the drug trade until 2017 when they were arrested and extradited to the U.S for trial on drug trafficking charges. On 16 August 2019, Baktash was sentenced to 25 years in prison.

He was married three times - to Karima, Gazi Hayat and Abdurahman Musa.
