= Heinz Zander (water polo) =

German water polo player (born 1923)

Personal information
- Nationality: German
- Born: 23 April 1923 Berlin, Weimar Republic

Sport
- Sport: Water polo

Heinz Zander (born 23 April 1923) was a German water polo player. He competed in the men's tournament at the 1952 Summer Olympics.
