= Eugénio Eleutério =

Portuguese sprinter (1920–2020)

Personal information
- Nationality: Portuguese
- Born: 3 November 1920
- Died: 28 July 2020 (aged 99)

Sport
- Sport: Sprinting
- Event: 200 metres

Eugénio Eleutério (3 November 1920 – 28 July 2020) was a Portuguese sprinter. He competed in the men's 200 metres at the 1952 Summer Olympics.
