= Tomás Paquete =

Portuguese sprinter

Personal information
- Nationality: Portuguese
- Born: 8 September 1923 Bissau, Guinea-Bissau
- Died: 25 May 2009 (aged 85) Lisbon, Portugal

Sport
- Sport: Sprinting
- Event: 100 metres

Tomás Paquete (8 September 1923 – 25 May 2009) was a Portuguese sprinter. He competed in the men's 100 metres at the 1952 Summer Olympics. He was amongst the greatest Portuguese record holder of 100 meters of all time, winning 18 national titles, and he was the holder of a meritorious career in international athletics, with 11 caps.
