= Fernando Casimiro =

Portuguese sprinter (1931–2014)

Personal information
- Nationality: Portuguese
- Born: 15 March 1931
- Died: 3 August 2014 (aged 83)

Sport
- Sport: Sprinting
- Event: 200 metres

Fernando Casimiro (15 March 1931 – 3 August 2014) was a Portuguese sprinter. He competed in the men's 200 metres at the 1952 Summer Olympics.
