= Claudino Castro =

Brazilian water polo player (1926–2003)

Personal information
- Born: 1926 Goiânia, Brazil
- Died: 1 August 2002 (aged 75–76)

Sport
- Sport: Water polo

Claudino Castro (1926 – 1 August 2002) was a Brazilian water polo player. He competed in the men's tournament at the 1952 Summer Olympics.
