= Miša David =

Miša David (June 6, 1942 – May 6, 2000) was a prominent architect and urban planner, one of the pioneers of ‘participative urban planning’ idea in former Yugoslavia. He graduated from The Faculty of Architecture, University of Belgrade in 1966. After attending a specialist course at the Centre for Environmental Studies in London (1972), he completed his MS Degree at The Faculty of Architecture, Belgrade (1975).

During his studies, together with a few of his close friends and colleagues, he created KMA (Klub Mladih Arhitekata – Association of Young Architects). Miša won a large number of awards on Yugoslavian architectural competitions and completed numerous urban plans and studies. He was also one of the founders and a charismatic director of Centre for Urban Development Planning- CEP (1975–1989), one of the most influential urban planning establishments on Yugoslavian soil of that era.
