= Octavian Iosim =

Romanian water polo player

Personal information
- Nationality: Romanian
- Born: 5 September 1930; Cleveland, Ohio, USA
- Died: 1988 (aged 57–58); Israel

Sport
- Sport: Water polo
- Club: ILSA Timișoara; Steaua București; Hapoel Tel Aviv

Octavian Iosim (born 5 September 1930 – 1988) was a Romanian water polo player. He competed in the men's tournament at the 1952 Summer Olympics.
