= Heinrich Krumpfholz =

Austrian water polo player (1925–2013)

Personal information
- Born: 19 March 1925 Vienna, Austria
- Died: 20 December 2013 (aged 88) Zemling, Niederösterreich, Austria

Sport
- Sport: Water polo

Heinrich Krumpfholz (19 March 1925 – 20 December 2013) was an Austrian water polo player who competed in the 1952 Summer Olympics. He died in Zemling, Niederösterreich on 20 December 2013, at the age of 88.
