= Franz Zigon =

Austrian water polo player (1924–2023)

Personal information
- Born: 24 March 1924; Linz, Austria
- Died: 1 July 2023 (aged 99)

Sport
- Sport: Water polo

Franz Zigon (24 March 1924 – 1 July 2023) was an Austrian water polo player who competed in the 1952 Summer Olympics. As of 2018, Zigon was still actively swimming at the age of 94. He died in July 2023, at the age of 99.
