= Arturo Coste =

Mexican water polo player

Personal information
- Nationality: Mexican
- Born: 15 June 1927

Sport
- Sport: Water polo

Arturo Coste (born 15 June 1927, date of death unknown) was a Mexican water polo player. He competed in the men's tournament at the 1952 Summer Olympics.
