= Vitaly Ushakov (water polo) =

Soviet water polo player (1920–1987)

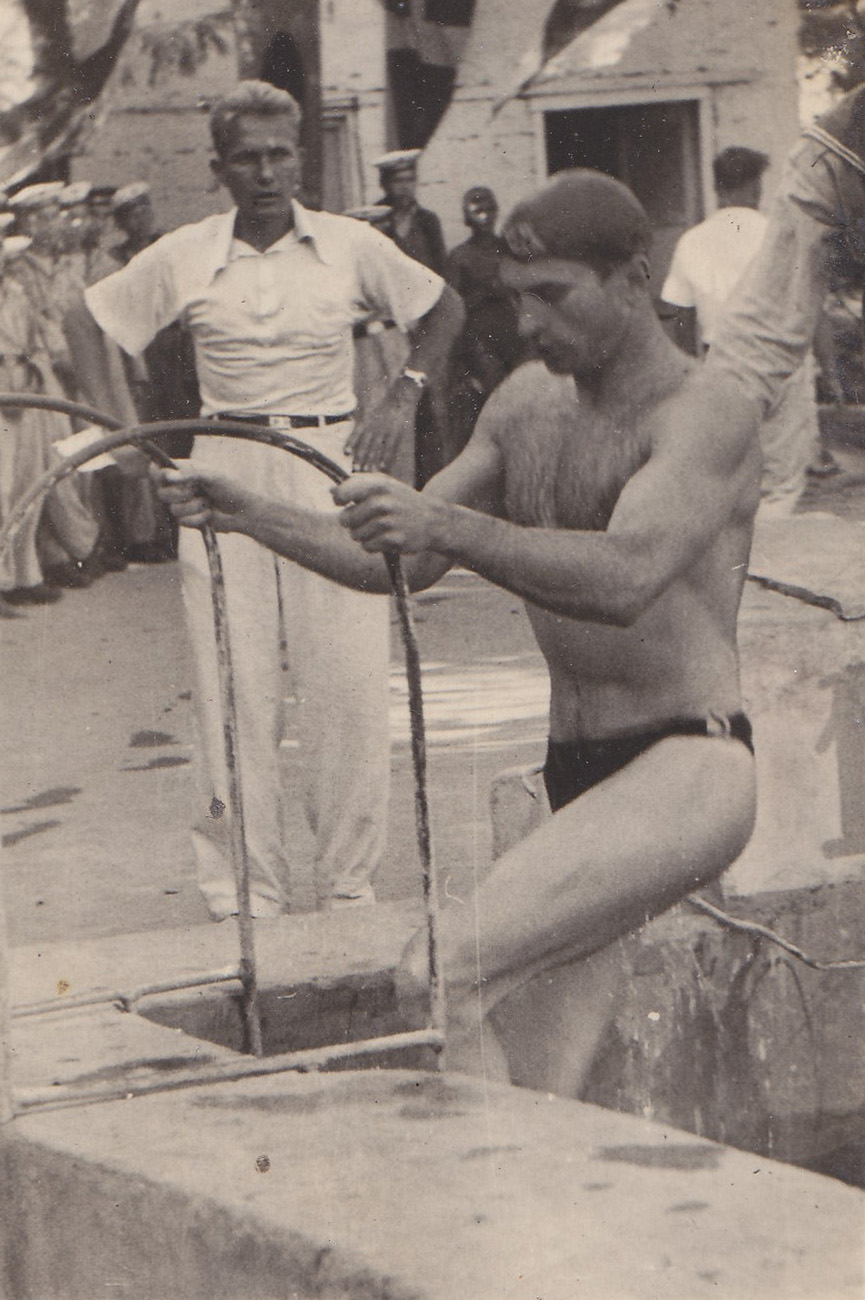

Personal information
- Nationality: Soviet
- Born: 18 July 1920; Moscow, Russia
- Died: 1987 (aged 66–67)

Sport
- Sport: Water polo

Vitaly Vladimirovich Ushakov (Russian: Вита́лий Влади́мирович Ушако́в; 18 July 1920 – 1987) was a Soviet water polo player. He competed in the men's tournament at the 1952 Summer Olympics.
