= Robert C. Bassett =

American publisher and political advisor (1911–2000)

Robert Bassett
- Born: March 2, 1911; Sturgeon Bay, Wisconsin, US
- Died: May 5, 2000 (aged 89); Las Vegas, Nevada, US
- Resting place: Arlington National Cemetery
- Education: University of Wisconsin (BA); Harvard University (LLB)

Robert C. Bassett (March 2, 1911 – May 5, 2000) was an American newspaper publisher, lawyer, and political advisor to U.S. Presidents Harry S. Truman and Richard Nixon.

== Early life and education ==
Bassett was born on March 2, 1911, to Clark and Lillian Bassett in Sturgeon Bay, Wisconsin. He attended the University of Wisconsin–Madison, where he was a member of the Wisconsin Badgers track and field team, graduating in 1932. Bassett later graduated from Harvard Law School in 1935.

== Career ==
Following graduation he opened a private law practice in Green Bay, Wisconsin, until he joined the United States Navy after the U.S. entered World War II. He retired from the navy as a lieutenant commander. After the war he became labor counsel for the Hearst Corporation and later became publisher of the Milwaukee Sentinel and vice president of the Joseph Schlitz Brewing Company. In 1952 Harry S. Truman appointed Bassett to the Wage Stabilization Board. He was named to the University of Wisconsin Board of Regents in 1958. Bassett was director of the United States Chamber of Commerce and was appointed by Richard Nixon to the Pay Board in 1971.

== Personal life ==
Bassett died from Alzheimer's disease on May 5, 2000, in Las Vegas, Nevada. He is interred at Arlington National Cemetery with his wife Sally (1922–1998).
