= Modesto Martínez =

Mexican water polo player (born 1934)

Personal information
- Nationality: Mexican
- Born: 18 February 1934 (age 91)

Sport
- Sport: Water polo

Modesto Martínez Ramos (born 18 February 1934) is a Mexican water polo player. He competed in the men's tournament at the 1952 Summer Olympics.
