= Melzar Williams =

American baseball player

- Outfielder
- Born: November 11, 1913; Mobile, Alabama, U.S.
- Died: May 13, 2000 (aged 86); Charlotte, North Carolina, U.S.
- Batted: Right Threw: Right

Negro league baseball debut
- 1937, for the Birmingham Black Barons

Last appearance
- 1938, for the Birmingham Black Barons

Teams
- Birmingham Black Barons (1937–1938)

Melzar John Williams (November 11, 1913 – May 13, 2000) was an American Negro league outfielder in the 1930s.

A native of Mobile, Alabama, Williams played for the Birmingham Black Barons in 1937 and 1938. In 40 recorded games, he batted .278 with a home run and 25 RBI. Williams died in Charlotte, North Carolina in 2000 at age 86.
