= Rolf Magener =

German businessman (1910–2000)

- Born: 3 August 1910; Odessa, Russian Empire
- Died: 5 May 2000 (aged 89); Heidelberg, Germany
- Education: University of Frankfurt
- Occupation: Business executive
- Known for: Prisoner's Bluff (1954)
- Spouse: Doris (née von Behling)

Rolf Magener (3 August 1910 – 5 May 2000) was the first German prisoner to escape successfully from India during the Second World War. His daring escape from a camp at Dehradun in 1944 with mountaineer Heinrich Harrer is documented in Magener's memoir, Prisoner's Bluff. After the war he became a successful business executive and chief financial officer for BASF, and held a senior-level position with Mercedes-Benz.

== Early years ==
Rolf Magener was born in Odessa on 3 August 1910 to a German businessman father and a Russian mother. He grew up in Germany, but his family spent significant time on the French Riviera due to the health of his mother. After completing boarding school at Hermann Lietz-Schule, he went on to study business management, spending several semesters at the University of Exeter, where he became fluent in English. Magener earned his doctorate from the University of Frankfurt in 1937, writing his dissertation on industry liquidity in economic trends. He then travelled widely around southeast Asia.

== War years ==
By 1938, Magener was working in Bombay for the German multi-national company IG Farben. At the start of the Second World War, he was interned in September 1939 by the British. By April 1944, he found himself with 1500 other foreign nationals in a warehouse in Dehradun near the border of Nepal at the foot of the Himalayas. Magener and his friend, Heins von Have, were resolved to escape. They learned that several other prisoners were also planning to escape, among them, Heinrich Harrer, who was part of the four-man climbing team that first scaled the Eiger north face in Switzerland. On the afternoon of 29 April 1944, seven internees made their escape, with Magener and von Have—both of whom spoke fluent English—disguised as British officers.

After the escape, the group split up. Harrer and Peter Aufschnaiter, both professional climbers, headed for Tibet. Harrer later recorded his adventures and friendship with the Dalai Lama in Seven Years in Tibet (1953). They were accompanied part of the way by Hans Kopp, who later wrote Himalayan Shuttlecock. Magener and von Have decided to make their way to Japan. They travelled 1,500 miles (2,400 km) southeast across India, still disguised as British soldiers, to the Japanese lines in Burma. Along the way, in an effort to maintain their disguise, they shared railway compartments and restaurant tables with actual British officers. On several occasions they were almost caught by military police.

At Calcutta, the pair changed their disguises, now pretending to be Swiss businessmen, and continued on by train and river steamer to Chittagong, from where they took a sampan to Cox's Bazar. They continued on foot through the jungle, fighting hunger and the approaching monsoon. After more than a month on the run they crossed the Naf River into Burma, where they were captured and imprisoned by Japanese troops who were convinced they were spies. Following two months on starvation rations, they were transferred to a jail at Rangoon, where they were appalled by the conditions inflicted on Allied prisoners. In September 1944, four months after their initial escape, news of their presence in Burma was released to the Press, and soon they were released and flown to Japan, where they waited out the war, working as honorary consuls at the German Embassy in Tokyo.

== Later years ==
In 1947, Magener returned to Germany, where he was again imprisoned by the Americans at the reception camp at Ludwigsburg. He was eventually released, and in 1955, he worked for the international chemical company BASF in their London office. In 1958 he became a financial director of the company and beginning in 1962 was a member of the board of directors. Magener retired in 1974. In 1976, he accepted a position on the supervisory board of BDO Germany, serving as its chairperson between 1983 and 1989. During this time, he also held a senior post with Mercedes-Benz in Germany.

Magener remained an Anglophile throughout his life, regularly spending his winters in London, where he and his wife kept an apartment and collected English paintings and furniture. In 1954, Magener published Prisoner's Bluff, an account of his wartime escape.

Rolf Magener died in Heidelberg, Germany on 5 May 2000 at the age of 89. He was survived by his wife Doris (née von Behling), whom he married in Japan in 1947.
