= Galal El-Din Abdel Meguid Abou El-Kheir =

Egyptian water polo player (born 1927)

Personal information
- Nationality: Egyptian
- Born: 3 September 1927

Sport
- Sport: Water polo

Galal El-Din Abdel Meguid Abou El-Kheir (born 3 September 1927) was an Egyptian water polo player. He competed in the men's tournament at the 1952 Summer Olympics.
