= Zoltan Hospodar =

Romanian water polo player

Personal information
- Nationality: Romanian
- Born: 8 March 1933 (age 92); Arad, Romania

Sport
- Sport: Water polo

Zoltan Hospodar (born 8 March 1933) is a Romanian water polo player. He competed at the 1952 Summer Olympics and the 1956 Summer Olympics.
