= Roland Sierens =

Belgian water polo player (1925–2010)

Personal information
- Nationality: Belgian
- Born: 15 July 1925 Ghent, Belgium
- Died: 14 May 2010 (aged 84) Ghent, Belgium

Sport
- Sport: Water polo

Roland Sierens (15 July 1925 – 14 May 2010) was a Belgian water polo player. He competed in the men's tournament at the 1952 Summer Olympics. Sierens died in Ghent on 14 May 2010, at the age of 84.
