= José Manuel Correia =

Portuguese water polo player (1925–1967)

Personal information
- Full name: José Manuel Correia Pinto
- Nationality: Portuguese
- Born: 26 July 1925 Algés, Oeiras, Portugal
- Died: 21 April 1967 (aged 41) Lisbon, Portugal

Sport
- Sport: Water polo

José Manuel Correia Pinto (26 July 1925 – 21 April 1967) was a Portuguese water polo player. He competed in the men's tournament at the 1952 Summer Olympics. Correia died in Lisbon on 21 April 1967, at the age of 41.
