= Álvaro Silva (fencer) =

Portuguese fencer (1920–1983)

Personal information
- Full name: Álvaro Francisco Torres de Andrade e Silva
- Born: 31 December 1920
- Died: 28 October 1983 (aged 62)

Sport
- Sport: Fencing

Álvaro Francisco Torres de Andrade e Silva (31 December 1920 – 28 October 1983) was a Portuguese fencer. He competed in the individual and team sabre events at the 1952 Summer Olympics. Silva died on 28 October 1983, at the age of 62.
