= João Franco do Vale =

Portuguese water polo player

Personal information
- Nationality: Portuguese
- Born: 13 July 1930; Lisbon, Portugal

Sport
- Sport: Water polo

João Franco do Vale (born 13 July 1930, date of death unknown) was a Portuguese water polo player. He competed in the men's tournament at the 1952 Summer Olympics.
