= Manuel Castro (water polo) =

Mexican water polo player

Personal information
- Full name: Manuel Castro Aparicio
- Born: 31 December 1923; Ciudad Juárez, Mexico

Sport
- Sport: Water polo

Manuel Castro (born 31 December 1923) was a Mexican water polo player. He competed in the men's tournament at the 1952 Summer Olympics.
