= Rodrigo Basto Junior =

Portuguese water polo player

Personal information
- Nationality: Portuguese
- Born: 29 March 1919; Lisbon, Portugal
- Died: before 2005

Sport
- Sport: Water polo

Rodrigo Bessone Basto Junior (29 March 1919 – before 2005) was a Portuguese water polo player. He competed in the men's tournament at the 1952 Summer Olympics.
