= Hellmut Theimer =

Austrian water polo player (1928–1984)

Personal information
- Nationality: Austrian
- Born: 15 February 1928
- Died: August 1984

Sport
- Sport: Water polo

Hellmut Theimer (15 February 1928 – August 1984) was an Austrian water polo player. He competed in the men's tournament at the 1952 Summer Olympics.
