= József Soproni (footballer) =

Hungarian footballer (1913–2000)

Personal information
- Date of birth: 26 January 1913
- Place of birth: Sopron, Austria-Hungary
- Date of death: 21 May 2000 (aged 87)
- Place of death: Sopron, Hungary

Senior career*
Years	Team	Apps	(Gls)
1928–1944.	SFAC 1900 SE	500+	

International career
1931–1938	Hungary Olympic	1	(0)
- * Club domestic league appearances and goals

József Soproni (26 January 1913 – 21 May 2000) was a Hungarian footballer. He competed in the men's tournament at the 1936 Summer Olympics.
