= Máximo Couto =

Portuguese water polo player (born 1923)

Personal information
- Nationality: Portuguese
- Born: 14 September 1923
- Died: before 2004

Sport
- Sport: Water polo

Máximo José Orvalho Simões Couto (14 September 1923 – before 2004) was a Portuguese water polo player. He competed in the men's tournament at the 1952 Summer Olympics.
