= Ernst Endl =

Austrian water polo player (1929–2000)

Ernst Gustav Endl
Personal information
- Nationality: Austrian
- Born: 25 December 1929; Austria
- Died: 13 May 2000 (aged 70); Sweden

Sport
- Sport: Water polo

Ernst Endl (25 December 1929 – 13 May 2000) was an Austrian water polo player. He competed in the men's tournament at the 1952 Summer Olympics.
