= Fernando Madeira =

Portuguese swimmer (1932–2025)

Personal information
- Born: 12 May 1932 Carnaxide, Portugal
- Died: 19 February 2025 (aged 92) Portugal

Sport
- Sport: Swimming

Fernando Madeira (12 May 1932 – 19 February 2025) was a Portuguese freestyle swimmer. He competed in two events and the water polo tournament at the 1952 Summer Olympics.

Madeira died on 19 February 2025, at the age of 92.
