= Armando Moutinho =

Portuguese water polo player (born 1915)

Personal information
- Nationality: Portuguese
- Born: 4 January 1915; Lisbon, Portugal

Sport
- Sport: Water polo

Armando Moutinho (born 4 January 1915, date of death unknown) was a Portuguese water polo player. He competed in the men's tournament at the 1952 Summer Olympics.
