= Óscar Cabral =

Portuguese water polo player

Personal information
- Nationality: Portuguese
- Born: 18 November 1921; Algés, Portugal
- Died: Before 2005

Sport
- Sport: Water polo

Óscar Cabral (born 18 November 1921) was a Portuguese water polo player. He competed in the men's tournament at the 1952 Summer Olympics.
