= Erich Sauermann =

German water polo player

Personal information
- Nationality: German
- Born: 7 December 1919; Linden-Limmer, Germany
- Died: 19 July 1984 (aged 64); Gleichen, West Germany

Sport
- Sport: Water polo

Erich Sauermann (7 December 1919 – 19 July 1984) was a German water polo player. He competed in the men's tournament at the 1952 Summer Olympics.
