= Eduardo Barbeiro =

Portuguese swimmer (1932–2022)

Personal information
- Born: 11 January 1932 Olhão, Portugal
- Died: 17 April 2022 (aged 90)

Sport
- Sport: Swimming

Eduardo Barbeiro (11 January 1932 – 17 April 2022) was a Portuguese breaststroke and backstroke swimmer. He competed in two swimming events and the water polo tournament at the 1952 Summer Olympics.
