= Norman Dornblaser =

American water polo player (born 1933)

Bill Dornblaser
Personal information
- Full name: Norman William Dornblaser
- Nationality: USA
- Born: November 4, 1933 (age 92) Hawthorne, California, United States
- Occupations: Lifeguard; Car Dealership owner

Sport
- Sport: Water polo
- Position: Center Back (WP, El Segundo)
- College team: El Camino College
- Club: El Segundo Swim Club
- Coached by: Urho Saari (El Segundo, Olympics); Urho Saari (El Camino College)
Medal record
Representing United States
Pan American Games
Bronze medal – third place	1951 Buenos Aires	Men's tournament

Norman William "Bill" Dornblaser (born November 4, 1933) is an American water polo player who competed for El Segundo High School and El Camino College, and participated in water polo at the 1952 Tokyo Olympics. He was coached in High School, El Camino College, and the 1952 Olympics by Urho Saari. He later worked as a greater Los Angeles area Lifeguard, and would later manage his own car dealership.

Dornblaser was born in Hawthorne, California on November 4, 1933. He attended El Segundo High School where he was coached in swimming and Water Polo by Urho Saari, a future USA Water Polo Hall of Fame Inductee. While swimming for El Segundo, Dornblaser most frequently played Center Back, a position that generally remained near the center of the court during transitions and could play as close as 2 meters from the center of the goal line, often giving Dornblaser opportunities to score, particularly after receiving passes from peripheral players.

== El Camino College ==
He later attended El Camino College, where he trained in swimming as a multi-stroke competitor competing in both individual medley and medley relay events. A strong regional team, in May 1952, El Camino College placed a close second to Fullerton College in the California State Junior College Swimming Championships. Dornblaser received a Varsity Letter in Water Polo while attending El Camino College where he continued to be trained in both water polo and swimming by his former High School coach Urho Saari.

In international competition, Dornblaster captured a U.S. National team bronze medal in water polo at the Pan American Games in Buenos Aires, Argentina, in early 1951. Dornblaser was 17, and still attending El Segundo High School. The entire U.S. water polo team that year were current or former El Segundo High School attendees.

== 1952 Helsinki Olympics ==
Dornblaser was a member of the American water polo team which finished fourth in the 1952 Olympic water polo tournament, where he was managed by Head Olympic Coach Urho Saari. He played seven matches. Though the U.S. won several games in the preliminary rounds, in the final water polo rounds in early August, 1952, they lost to Yugoslavia 4-2, and were shut out by Hungary 4-0, settling for a fourth place finish with pre-game favorite Hungary taking the gold medal, Yugoslavia taking the Silver medal, and Italy taking the bronze medal.

In careers, Dornblaster served as a life guard in greater Los Angeles and later worked in sales and management at his own Los Angeles area car dealership that featured his name in the title.
