= El Segundo High School =

Location
- 640 Main Street; El Segundo, California 90245; United States; 33.925°N 118.414°W

Information
- Type: Public high school
- Motto: Enter to learn. Go forth for service
- Established: 1927; 99 years ago
- School district: El Segundo Unified School District
- Principal: Steve Gebhart
- Teaching staff: 51.84 (FTE)
- Grades: 9 - 12
- Enrollment: 1,290 (2023–2024)
- Student to teacher ratio: 24.88
- Colors: Blue and gold
- Athletics conference: CIF Southern Section; Pioneer League
- Nickname: Eagles
- Publication: Reflections (student created work)
- Newspaper: Bay Eagle
- Yearbook: Golden Eagle
- Website: elsegundohigh.org

El Segundo High School

El Segundo High School, or ESHS, is a four-year public high school located in El Segundo, California. It is the only secondary school incorporated by El Segundo Unified School District.

First built in 1927, the school campus contains 5 main buildings built from a brick facade.

== Demographics ==
As of 2019–2020 1,231 students attend the school. The grade breakdown follows:

Students Enrolled in a Particular Grade
	Grade 9	Grade 10	Grade 11	Grade 12
Total Students	323	322	307	279

The student population is about 49% white, 24% Hispanic, 14% two or more races, 6.4% Asian, 6.0% black, and less than 1% each Native Hawaiian/Pacific Islander and American Indian/Native Alaskan.

== Media ==
Many films and television broadcasts were shot at the high school. The major movies and television broadcasts are shown below, in order from recent releases to old releases.

- Family Switch (2023)
- Candy Cane Lane (2023)
- All American (2018)
- The Babysitter (2017)
- Blue Lagoon: The Awakening (2012)
- 90210 (2008-2013)
- Role Models (2008)
- Superbad (2007)
- Epic Movie (2007)
- Yours, Mine, & Ours (2005)
- The O.C. (2003-2007)
- Joan of Arcadia (2003-2005)
- The Hot Chick (2002)
- Moving (1988)
- WarGames (1983)
- Blackboard Jungle (1955)
- It Happened in Brooklyn (1947)

Along with movies, music videos have also been filmed here:

- ‘’Clown’’ (1994) - Korn
- "iF yoU C Jordan" (2002) - Something Corporate

== Athletics ==
Below are notable sports the school offers (but is not limited to this list) in alphabetical order

- American Swimming
  - Won Division 3 and Division 2 CIF championships back to back (2010-2011)
- Baseball
- Basketball
  - Boys Basketball has won a CIF Southern Section title in 1963
- Beach Volleyball
- Cheerleading
- Cross Country
- Flag Football
- Football
- Golf
- Lacrosse
- Marching Band
- Soccer (Association Football)
  - Boys Soccer won Back-to-Back CIF State Championships in 2018 and 2019
- Softball
- Surfing
- Tennis
- Track and field
- Volleyball
  - Boys Volleyball has 3 CIF Southern Section titles and 1 CIF State Championship in 2023 since the start of the Boys Volleyball program in 2007
- Water Polo
  - Won 12 CIF Boy's Water Polo championships under coach Urho Saari, member of USA Water Polo Hall of Fame
- Color Guard / Winter Guard

== Notable alumni ==
- Bobby Beathard, NFL general manager
- Pete Beathard, AFL-NFL-WFL quarterback
- George Brett, Hall of Fame baseball player
- Ken Brett, MLB pitcher
- Joe Caravello, NFL tight end
- Derryl Cousins, MLB umpire
- Keith Erickson, NBA player and broadcaster
- Scott McGregor, MLB pitcher
- Bob Meistrell, co-founder of the Body Glove wetsuits and Dive and Surf dive store
- George Myatt, professional baseball player/coach/manager
- Lars Nootbaar, professional baseball player
- Jim Obradovich, NFL tight end
- Zak Shinall, professional baseball player
- James B. Sikking, actor
- James Slatton, 1972 U.S. Olympic Bronze medalist in water polo
- Billy Traber, MLB pitcher
- John Van Hamersveld, graphic designer
- Columbus Short, actor
- Sinqua Walls, actor
- Brandon Jawato, professional basketball player
