= Hugh Bradner =

American physicist, neoprene wetsuit inventor (1915–2008)

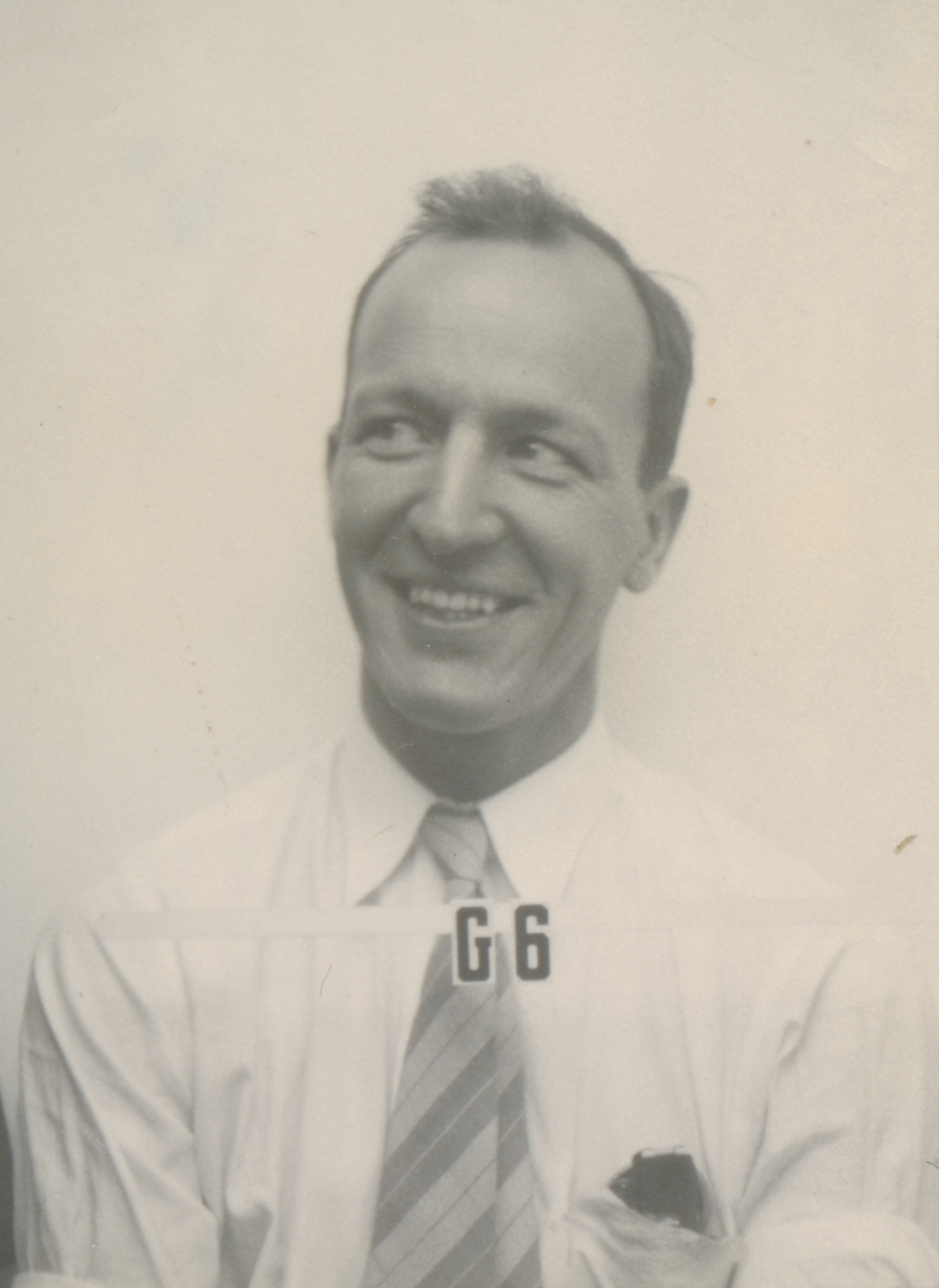
- Bradner's identification badge photo from Los Alamos
- Born: November 5, 1915; Tonopah, Nevada, US
- Died: May 5, 2008 (aged 92); San Diego, California, US
- Other name: Brad
- Education: Miami University - A.B. (1937); California Institute of Technology - Ph.D. (1941)
- Awards: Miami University Medal (1960); Sc.D. (Honorary), Miami University (1961)
- Scientific career
- Fields: Engineering, physics, and geophysics
- Workplaces: Champion Paper & Fiber Co. (1936–1937); California Institute of Technology (1938–1941); US Naval Ordnance Laboratory (1941–1943); University of Chicago (1943–1943); Los Alamos National Laboratory (1943–1946); University of California, Berkeley (1946–1961); University of California, San Diego (1961–1980)
- Doctoral advisor: William Vermillion Houston

Hugh Bradner (November 5, 1915 – May 5, 2008) was an American physicist at the University of California who is credited with inventing the neoprene wetsuit, which helped to revolutionize scuba diving and surfing.

A graduate of Ohio's Miami University, he received his doctorate from California Institute of Technology in Pasadena, California, in 1941. He worked at the US Naval Ordnance Laboratory during World War II, where he researched naval mines. In 1943, he was recruited by Robert Oppenheimer to join the Manhattan Project at the Los Alamos Laboratory. There, he worked with scientists including Luis Alvarez, John von Neumann and George Kistiakowsky on the development of the high explosives and exploding-bridgewire detonators required by atomic bombs.

After the war, Bradner took a position studying high-energy physics at the University of California, Berkeley, under Luis Alvarez. Bradner investigated the problems encountered by frogmen staying in cold water for long periods of time. He developed a neoprene suit which could trap the water between the body and the neoprene, and thereby keep them warm. He became known as the "father of the wetsuit."

Bradner worked on the 1951 Operation Greenhouse nuclear test series on Enewetak Atoll in the Marshall Islands. He joined the Scripps Institute of Geophysics and Planetary Physics as a geophysicist in 1961. He remained there for the rest of his career, becoming a full professor in 1963, and retiring in 1980. In retirement, continued to work both on oceanographic research, as well as on the DUMAND deep ocean neutrino astronomy project.

== Early life ==
Hugh Bradner was born in Tonopah, Nevada, on November 5, 1915, but he was raised in Findlay, Ohio. His father, Donald Byal Bradner, was briefly director of the Chemical Warfare Service at Maryland's Edgewood Arsenal. His mother was Agnes Claire Bradner née Mead. He had an older brother, Mead Bradner. Bradner graduated from Ohio's Miami University in 1936 and later received his doctorate from California Institute of Technology in Pasadena, California, in 1941, writing his thesis on "Electron-optical studies of the photoelectric effect" under the supervision of William Vermillion Houston.

== Manhattan Project ==
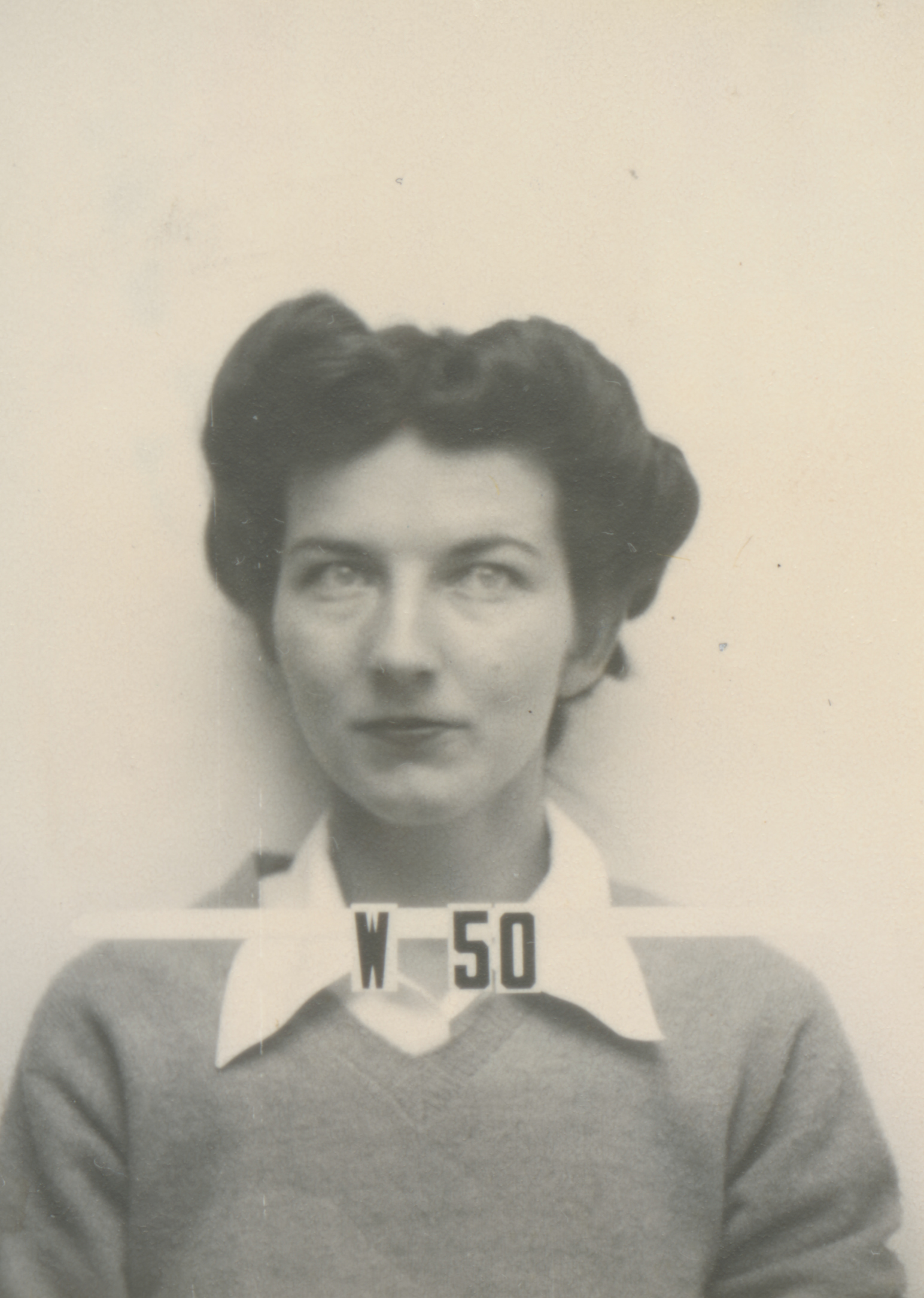
Marjorie Bradner's identification badge photo from Los Alamos

After receiving his doctorate from Caltech, Bradner worked at the US Naval Ordnance Laboratory where he researched naval mines until 1943. He was recruited by Robert Oppenheimer to join the Manhattan Project in 1943 at the Los Alamos Laboratory in New Mexico, which helped to develop the first atomic bomb. Bradner helped to develop a wide range of technology needed for the bomb, including research on the high explosives and exploding-bridgewire detonators needed to implode the atomic bomb, developed the bomb's triggering mechanism, and even helped design the new town around the laboratory. He worked closely with some of the most prominent scientists including Luis Alvarez, John von Neumann and George Kistiakowsky. He witnessed the Trinity test, the first nuclear weapons test, at Alamogordo on July 16, 1945.

Bradner met his future wife, Marjorie Hall Bradner, who was also working as a secretary on the Manhattan Project at the Los Alamos Laboratory. The couple were married in Los Alamos in 1943. Security at the top secret facility was so tight that neither Bradner's nor Hall's parents were allowed to attend the ceremony, though Oppenheimer was among the wedding guests. The couple remained together for over 65 years until she died on April 10, 2008, at the age of 89.

== Wetsuit ==
After the war, Bradner took a position studying high-energy physics at the University of California, Berkeley under Luis Alvarez, whom he had worked with at the Manhattan Project. He remained at the university until 1961. He worked on the 1951 atomic bombing test on Enewetak Atoll in the Marshall Islands, which was part of the Operation Greenhouse nuclear test series.

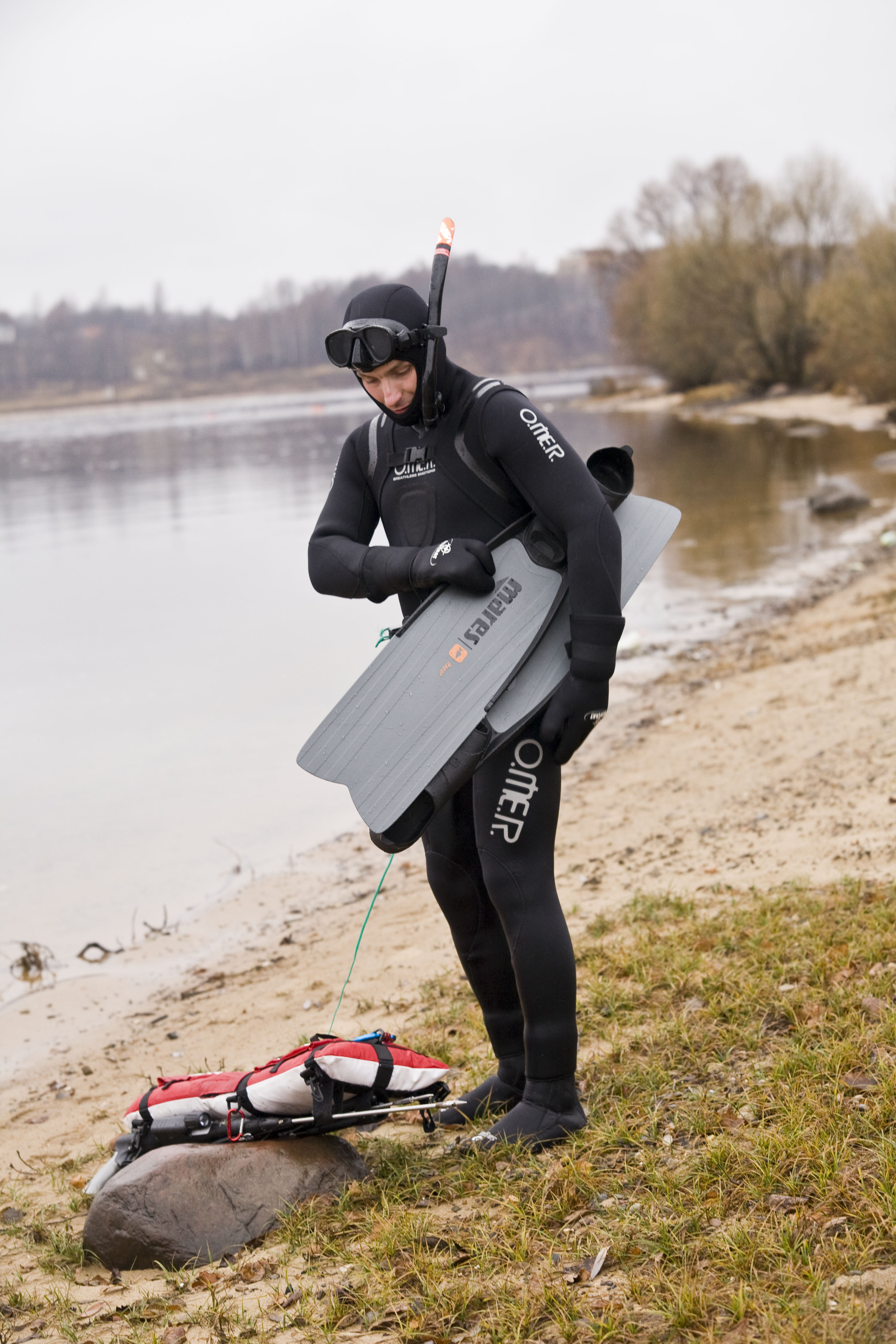
A man wearing a modern wetsuit

Bradner's job at Berkeley required him to do a number of underwater dives. He had previously talked to United States Navy frogmen during World War II concerning the problems of staying in cold water for long periods of time, which causes the diver to lose large amounts of body heat quickly. He worked on developing a new suit that would counter this in the basement of his family's home on Scenic Avenue in Berkeley, California, and researched the new wetsuit at a conference in Coronado, California, in December 1951. According to the San Francisco Chronicle, the wetsuit was invented in 1952. Bradner and other engineers founded the Engineering Development Company (EDCO) in order to develop it. He and his colleagues tested several versions and prototypes of the wetsuit at the Scripps Institution of Oceanography in La Jolla, California. Scripps scientist and engineer Willard Bascom advised Bradner to use neoprene for the suit material, which proved successful. He found that it "would trap the water between the body and the neoprene, and the water would heat up to body temperature and keep you warm".

A 1951 letter showed that Bradner clearly understood that the insulation in such a suit was not provided by the water between the suit and the skin, but rather that this layer of water next to the skin, if trapped, would quickly heat to skin temperature, if the material in the suit were insulative. Thus, the suit only needed to limit purging by fresh cold water, and it did not need to be dry to work. He applied for a U.S. patent for the wetsuit, but his patent application was turned down due to its similar design with the flight suit. The United States Navy also did not adopt the new wetsuits because of worries that the neoprene in the wetsuits might make its swimmers easier to spot by underwater sonar and, thus, could not exclusively profit from his invention.

Bradner and his company, EDCO, tried to sell his wetsuits in the consumer market. However, he failed to successfully penetrate the wetsuit market, unlike, for example Bob Meistrell and Bill Meistrell, the founders of Body Glove, and Jack O'Neill. Various claims have been made over the years that it was O'Neill or the Meistrell brothers who actually invented the wetsuit instead of Bradner, but recent researchers have concluded that it was Bradner who created the original wetsuit, and not his competitors. In 2005 the Los Angeles Times concluded that Bradner was the "father of the wetsuit", and a research paper published by Carolyn Rainey at the Scripps Institution of Oceanography in 1998 provided corroborating evidence.

== Later career and life ==
Bradner joined the Scripps Institute of Geophysics and Planetary Physics as a geophysicist in 1961. He became a full professor in 1963 and retired in 1980. He remained interested in oceanography, scuba diving, seashell collecting and the outdoors throughout his later years, and continued to work both on oceanographic research, as well as on the DUMAND deep ocean neutrino astronomy project, which combined his two careers in physics and oceanography.

Hugh Bradner died at the age of 92 at his home in San Diego, California, on May 5, 2008, from complications of pneumonia.
