= Jammin' in the Middle E =

Jammin' in the Middle E is an Australia drama set amongst the Arab-Australian community in Sydney's West. The feature aired on 16 February 2006 on SBS.

== Plot ==
The movie sheds light on the inhabitants of Western Sydney, an area known for its cultural diversity and in the eyes of some its ethnic related gang violence. It revolves around Naima (Julie Kanaan), her romantic interest Rafi (Matuse) and her brother Ishak (NOMISe) living their run-of-the-mill middle class conservative Lebanese Muslim existence. Sharief (Anthony Hawwa) is the film's standover man, a Lebanese youth gang leader who causes trouble for Ishak, his brother Musa (Mohamed Jajatieh) and cousin Hakim (Marouf Alameddine).

== Cast ==
- Ishak - NOMISe
- Naima - Julie Kanaan
- Rafi - Matuse
- Said - Fadl Abdul Hay
- Musa - Mohamed Jajatieh
- Hakim - Marouf Alameddine
- Grandma - Armida Croccolo
- Thana - Susan Chamma
- Sarwa - Elissar Mukhtar
- Mom - Chadia Gedeon Hajjar
- Sharief - Anthony Hawwa
- Police Man - David Scott
- Layla - Issra Jajatieh
- Omar - Pino Scuro

== Production ==
It was produced by Virus Media. The production received support from various organisations including the Australia Council, NSW Ministry for the Arts, Australian Film Commission, NSW Film and Television Office and SBSi.

== Crew ==
- Producer - Enda Murray
- Director - Kim Mordaunt
- Writer - Howard Jackson
- Director of Photography - Joel Peterson
- Co-producer - Cinzia Guaraldi
