= Uma O'Neill =

New Zealand equestrian

Personal information
- Born: 23 March 1995 (age 30); Maui, Hawaii, U.S.
- Relative: Jack O'Neill (grandfather)

Sport
- Country: New Zealand
- Sport: Equestrian
- Event: Show jumping

Uma O'Neill (born 23 March 1995) is a professional show jumper and Olympic veteran representing New Zealand.

== Personal life ==
Born in Hawaii, O'Neill moved to Santa Cruz, California when she was 12 years old and continues to base her equine development and sales business out of the area. She has held dual American and New Zealand citizenship since infancy, a nod to her father's heritage.

O'Neill competed for the United States through her junior and amateur riding career before formally switching nationalities to represent New Zealand in 2019.

O'Neill's mother Shawne was a professional windsurfer, and her grandfather Jack O'Neill founded the popular surf wear company, O'Neill (brand), which remains in the O'Neill family.

== Career ==
O'Neill competed in the North American Junior and Young Rider Championships (now the North American Youth Championships) and the United States' U25 National Championships before progressing to the senior level of show jumping sport. In 2018, she and her longtime mount Clockwise of Greenhill Z produced the only clear effort to win the CSI4*-W Longines FEI Jumping World Cup Vancouver (CAN).

She represented New Zealand for the first time in team competition in the FEI Nations Cup at CSIO3* Drammen (NOR). In 2021, O'Neill was selected to represent her country at the Tokyo Olympic Games. Again with Clockwise of Greenhill Z, she made her Olympic debut in individual competition.

She remains a top candidate to represent her nation at upcoming Championships as she trains out of O'Neill Show Jumping in Santa Cruz, working to develop a strong string of competition and sales horses.
