= Save Our Shores =

Marine conservation organization based in California, U.S.

- Abbreviation: SOS
- Founded: 1978; 48 years ago
- Type: Nonprofit
- Purpose: Marine Conservation
- Headquarters: Santa Cruz, CA
- Region served: Central Coast of California
- Methods: Advocacy; Community Outreach; Research; Education
- Executive director: Katie Thompson
- Website: saveourshores.org

Save Our Shores (SOS) is a marine conservation nonprofit organization which aims to "foster thriving and sustainable ecosystems in the Monterey Bay and surrounding habitats through equitable environmental action.”

Save Our Shores has established the Monterey Bay National Marine Sanctuary (MBNMS), prevented offshore oil drilling along the Central Coast of California, developed the nationally renowned Dockwalkers clean boating program, banned single-use plastic bags in over 30 jurisdictions, and led marine conservation beach cleaning events and K-12 educational programs throughout the Monterey Bay area.

Today, the organization primarily focuses on advocacy, marine debris (specifically plastic pollution), and helping community members become ocean stewards. This includes educating the greater community about local watersheds and marine protected areas (MPA), tackling the plastic pollution problem by passing local ordinances and hosting cleanups, supporting habitat conservation efforts, educating and empowering community members to help them face oncoming climate change, and continuing to implement their Sanctuary Stewards and Dockwalker programs.

== History ==
Save Our Shores was established in 1978 by Karen DeLaney, Joan Harrington, Karol Mountz, John Murray, Bonnie and Gordon Schmeisser, Kay Smothers, Kim Tschantz, Van Tunstall, and Nelson Wolf. The group was entirely volunteer-based, without any paid staff, until Dan Haifley became the executive director in 1986. Haifley remained executive director until 1993. The current executive director is Katie Thompson, who took up the role in 2024.

== Programs ==
=== Beach, river, kayak, and inland cleanups ===
Save Our Shores has been conducting beach, river, kayak, and inland cleanups since its establishment in 1978. The nonprofit primarily hosts its public, private, and school cleanups throughout Santa Cruz and Monterey counties. In 2017, Save Our Shores led a total of 243 cleanups. During these cleanups, Save Our Shores and community volunteers removed over 8 tons of waste. Since 2008, data has been collected from each cleanup to identify pollution and marine debris issues impacting the Monterey Bay National Marine Sanctuary and the Pacific Ocean at large. For example, in 2017, the top three items collected were small plastic pieces (approximately 13,000), cigarette butts (over 12,000), microplastics, and styrofoam pieces (nearly 7,000). Many of Save Our Shores’ advocacy efforts, including local bans on single-use plastics and polystyrene containers, are driven by cleanup data analysis.

=== Sanctuary stewards ===
Sanctuary stewards are the core volunteer force of Save Our Shores dedicated to conserving the Monterey Bay National Marine Sanctuary. The program prepares community members to become educators, advocates and experts on issues affecting the Monterey Bay and work toward local pollution prevention. Sanctuary stewards give academic presentations, lead beach cleanups, participate in community events, and work on research projects, such as data collection and entry.

=== Dockwalkers ===
Developed in 1999, the Dockwalker program provides one-on-one clean boater outreach in local harbors. Dockwalkers share clean boating best practices and provide boaters with clean boating kits, such as supplies to clean up small oil spills and resources to discard used oil and waste products. Due to its success, the Save Our Shores Dockwalker program was adopted and implemented statewide by the California Coastal Commission in 2000.

== See also ==
- Clean Boating Act of 2008
- Clean Water Act
- Environmental education in the United States
- O'Neill Sea Odyssey
- Offshore oil and gas in California
- Pollution in California
- Riverkeeper
