= Bob Meistrell =

American inventor and businessperson (1928–2013)

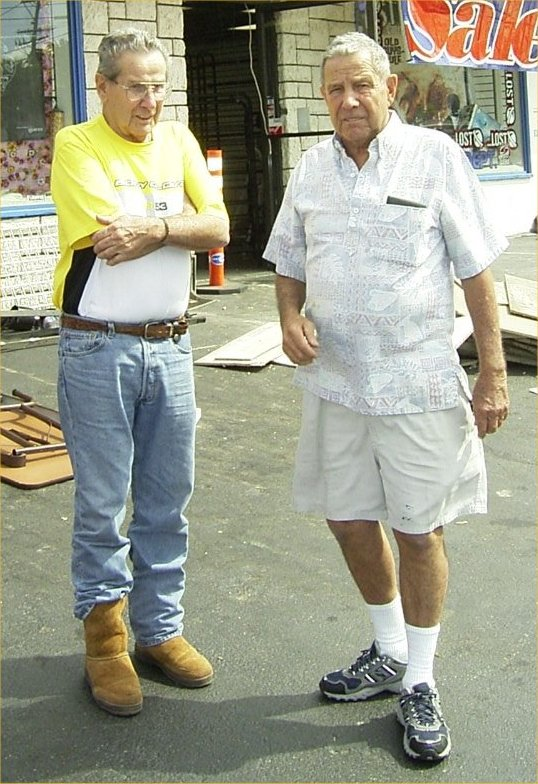
Meistrell (right) with brother Bill outside of Dive N' Surf, 2008

Robert "Bob" Meistrell (July 31, 1928 – June 16, 2013) was an American businessman, philanthropist, surfer, and diver. Along with his twin brother Bill and business partner Bev Morgan, Meistrell helped develop and market the first commercial neoprene wetsuit. This evolved into the Body Glove surf brand, which by 2013 was a $200 million annual enterprise and a leader in the field.

== Early life ==
Sons of a banker who was murdered when they were four, identical twins Bob and Bill Meistrell were born in Boonville, Missouri, on July 31, 1928. The youngest of seven, Meistrell relocated to California with his family at the age of 16. Although Meistrell had not before that time even seen the ocean, he developed a fascination with it in early childhood. He and his brother taught themselves to dive in ponds in Missouri, using a bicycle pump, a garden hose and a diving helmet cobbled from household supplies.

== Dive N'Surf and Body Glove ==
Meistrell graduated from El Segundo High School and then entered the United States Army during the Korean War. He was stationed at Fort Ord. In 1953, then Los Angeles County lifeguards, he and his brother invested in diver Bev Morgan's surf shop in Redondo Beach, Dive N' Surf. The brothers replaced Morgan's former partner, surfboard shaper Hap Jacobs, buying in with $1,800 borrowed from their mother. Morgan had discovered a rejected design for a two-piece military neoprene wetsuit and was selling this through his shop. The suit was not popular, however, and to begin with, the partners could only afford to work part-time in the store, having to maintain other jobs to support themselves and their fledgling business.

Meistrell and his partners focused on making the wetsuit more comfortable by being the first to manufacture wetsuits using neoprene. In the late 1950s, the partners formed a corporation. Morgan wanted to leave the company, and arranged with the brothers to pay off his interest at 30% of the business's assets, a debt they satisfied over a decade by paying Morgan's alimony payments to his ex-wife. In 1959, the film Gidget helped popularize the wetsuit, and as demand rose Meistrell expanded their product line, establishing the Body Glove brand with products for surfers, divers and other water sports athletes in the mid-1960s. In the 1990s, the company moved manufacturing to Thailand. Today, the Meistrell family still owns 25% of Body Glove.

== Diving and exploration ==
In addition to his business enterprise, Meistrell was a diving instructor, including working with celebrities such as Lloyd Bridges, Gary Cooper, Charlton Heston and Richard Harris to prepare them for roles.

Meistrell was also proponent and builder of one-man submarines which he used to search the seabed particular for wreckage. In his explorations, alone or with others, he found off the coast of Catalina a store of jade, off Palos Verdes a 280-lb stone that resembled anchor stones in use by the Chinese 2,000 years ago, and off Crescent City a cache of gold coins from a sunken paddle wheel steamer.

In the early 1990s, Bob helped found the Catalina Conservancy Divers, a volunteer group involved in the protection and restoration of the waters around the island. Conservancy divers assist academics in studying the aquatic environment, planting sensors, counting species, and an unsuccessful attempt to reestablish the over collected abalone population.

== Death ==
Meistrell died on June 16, 2013, of a heart attack at the age of 84 while repairing his boat the Disappearance in Catalina, before setting off to be the lead boat for a paddleboard race. He was survived by his wife (Patty), three sons (Robbie, Ronnie, Randy), nine grandchildren (Tracey, Matt, Jamie, Nick, Kenna, Robert, Rhoni, Randi, and Makayla) and three great-grandchildren (Mia, Maddox, and Mila).
