= O'Neill (brand) =

American apparel company

- Type: Private
- Founded: San Francisco, California, U.S. 1952; 74 years ago
- Founder: Jack O'Neill
- Headquarters: Luxembourg, Grand Duchy of Luxembourg
- Products: Apparel: surfwear, swimwear, snowwear
- Parent: Sisco Textiles N.V.
- Website: eu.oneill.com

O'Neill is an originally Californian surfwear and surfboard brand, now owned by Sisco Textiles, a privately held company headquartered in Luxembourg. It was started in 1952 by Jack O'Neill in San Francisco, and was later based in Santa Cruz. The company logo symbolizes a breaking surf wave. "O'NEILL" and the "Wave logo" are trademarks registered worldwide.

== History ==
Jack O'Neill started the company in 1952 in the garage of his house near Ocean Beach in San Francisco, later moving to a site in a bar parking lot on the Great Highway. By the end of the decade he and the business moved to Santa Cruz, where he opened his second store in 1959. Jack O'Neill was one of the originators of the use of neoprene for wetsuits. O'Neill was a pioneering retailer of surfwear and also sells lifestyle apparel and snow sports-related apparel.

In May 2007 the ownership of the brand was sold to Sisco Textiles N.V., a holding company headquartered in Luxembourg. In 2009, O'Neill went into administration in the United Kingdom, closing 6 locations by October 2009. O'Neill currently has satellite offices in countries including the United States, Canada, the Netherlands, Australia, Chile, and Korea. Products are distributed to 86 countries, some by licensed distributors. In the United States, the O'Neill clothing license has been held by the La Jolla Group since 1993, and the company is now headquartered in Irvine, California. The O'Neill wetsuit business remains in the ownership of the O'Neill family, with its headquarters in Santa Cruz. The first Santa Cruz store, near Cowell Beach, was designated a California Point of Historical Interest in 2012. Jack O'Neill died in 2017.

In early 2025 the company announced the closure of its flagship store in downtown Santa Cruz, while retaining other stores in the city.

== Charitable and stewardship activities ==
The O'Neill Sea Odyssey, established by Jack O'Neill in 1996, is a free program to strengthen mostly disadvantaged children's connection to the environment, which is a non-profit arm of the company.

O'Neill also promotes responsible stewardship of the marine environment through donations to the Surfrider Foundation and through its O'Neill Blue brand of sustainably sourced swimwear, introduced in 2015.
