= Advisory Committee on Government Organization =

The U.S. President’s Advisory Committee on Government Organization (the Rockefeller Committee) was established by Executive Order 10432 on January 24, 1953. Members of the committee were appointed by President Dwight D. Eisenhower and served without compensation. Nelson A. Rockefeller served as Chairman until 1958; upon his resignation, Arthur S. Flemming served as Chairman. Other permanent members were Dr. Milton S. Eisenhower and Don K. Price, Jr. In addition to the permanent members, the committee had the services of experts from government, universities and business who acted as consultants. A few of the consultants were: Dr. Ernest Williams, Professor Emmette S. Redford, Herman Pollack, Fordyce Luikart, Willard Bascom, Jerold Kieffer, Joseph Dodge, and William Barclay Harding.

== Committee objectives ==
To strengthen the executive authority of the president and of the heads of departments and agencies to facilitate administration within the Executive Branch.

To clarify the internal organization of individual departments or agencies.

To improve government-wide procedures within the Executive Branch, particularly in the fields of personnel management and budget controls, with a view to facilitate and strengthen departmental management.

To better organization related or overlapping governmental activities through interdepartmental transfers.

To eliminate functions which have outlived their usefulness, and curtail activities which are extended beyond present need.

== Committee procedures ==
Review of pertinent material prepared in recent years on improvements in government organization, including: the Hoover Commission Report, the Temple University Survey, Bureau of the Budget staff papers, and special departmental studies

Evaluation of material in relation to the above objectives, and preparation of tentative recommendations for action.

Discussions with the Budget Director, Cabinet heads and Congressional leaders to develop common views on organization and management recommendations. These recommendations will take into consideration the political issues involved.

Submission of a series of recommendations to the president for approval.

The Committee to be of such assistance as appropriate in connection with: (a) Preparation by the Bureau of the Budget and Departments of proposed legislation and Executive Orders to carry out the approved recommendations, and (b) Preparation of a time schedule for submission of legislation by the Director of the Budget.

The Committee was abolished February 10, 1961, by President John F. Kennedy. Its functions were transferred to the U.S. Bureau of the Budget.
