= Dan Haifley =

American journalist

- Born: 20th century
- Occupations: Environmentalist and newspaper columnist
- Years active: 20th–21st centuries

Dan Haifley is an American environmentalist and newspaper columnist.

From 1999 to 2019, he was Executive Director of O'Neill Sea Odyssey, a non-profit organization offering a free oceanography and ecology program for school-aged youth sailing Monterey Bay – a bay of the Pacific Ocean, along the central coast of California. Tracey Weiss is now serving in the position..

== Career ==
From 1986 to 1993, Haifley was Executive Director of Save Our Shores, based in Santa Cruz, California, where he spearheaded the creation of the Monterey Bay National Marine Sanctuary as Co-Chair of the Environmental Working Group which successfully focused on obtaining a boundary extending north to Gulf of the Farallones National Marine Sanctuary to prevent offshore oil drilling. He also led the effort against offshore oil drilling, including passage of twenty-six local ordinances in California counties and cities limiting development of onshore facilities for offshore drilling, also known as the Blue Wall, and their defense against a lawsuit by the oil industry as represented by the Western Oil and Gas Association.

Haifley wrote the column "Our Ocean Backyard" for the Santa Cruz Sentinel newspaper until April, 2019. Today, Tracey Weiss writes the column. As of December 2025, Haifley began writing the Ocean Currents column for the Sentinel every two weeks.

In August 2011, he was given the Ocean Hero award by Save Our Shores.

According to the book Jack O'Neill: It's Always Summer on the Inside (2011) by Drew Kampion, Haifley – as the program's executive director – has argued the program's position that ocean concepts should be adopted in formal education standards and made more widely available to youth from economically disadvantaged backgrounds.

After his retirement in 2019, Haifley continued to advocate for the ocean and coast through his advocacy for the creation of Chumash Heritage National Marine Sanctuary, the fight against offshore oil, and raising funds for Monterey Bay National Marine Sanctuary as a board member of the Monterey Bay Chapter of the National Marine Sanctuary Foundation.

== See also ==
- List of people from California
