= Matuse =

American wetsuit and outdoor apparel company

Matuse Inc.
- Type: Private company
- Industry: Textile
- Founded: 2006; 20 years ago in San Diego, California, United States
- Founder: John Vincent Campbell and Matthew Larson
- Headquarters: San Diego, California, United States
- Key people: Matthew Larson: Chief design officer, Founder, 2005 - present John Vincent Campbell: Chief executive officer | CEO, Founder, Creative Director, 2005-2018
- Products: Wetsuits
- Website: matuse.com

Matuse is an American company focused on wetsuits and outdoor apparel for both men and women. The company focuses on creating wetsuits from sustainable materials, including Geoprene and Geoflex using water-based glues for seams and laminations.

== History ==
Matuse was founded in 2006 in San Diego, California. Co-founded by John Campbell,,, and Matthew Larson.

Matuse was established with the intention of creating sustainable wetsuits by using a premium material named Geoprene; an eco-friendly Japanese limestone rubber (an alternative to oil-based neoprene). Later on, Matuse started creating other sustainable wetsuits made from a premium material named Geoflex; using water-based glues for seams and laminations, along with recycled nylons and rubber.

One of Matuse's wetsuits (the Dante Hydrasilk) was named one of the ten best sustainable wetsuits of 2023 by Surfd.com for the eco-friendly materials it's made out of.

Matuse's logo is derived from an ancient Taoist symbol that signifies three solid lines for heaven, three broken lines for Earth and a circle that represents the constant quest for perfection. Matuse's slogan is to make all their products ichiban, a Japanese phrase which means to make everything the best it can possibly be.

In 2023, Matuse opened a branch in Australia.
