= Willard Bascom =

American oceanographer

Willard Bascom (1916-2000)

Willard Newell Bascom (November 7, 1916 – September 20, 2000), was an engineer, adventurer and scientist, as well as a writer, photographer, painter, miner, cinematographer, and archeologist, who first proposed using neoprene for wetsuits to fellow scientist Hugh Bradner. He authored several books which include the topics of waves, geology, archaeology, poetry, and oceanography. In his book Deep Water, Ancient Ships he first proposed the hypothesis that anoxic water in the Black Sea would preserve ancient Black Sea shipwrecks. He led the first test drillings for Project Mohole, and was project director from 1960-1962. Bascom was a consultant to the Advisory Committee on Government Organization. He also served as the Technical Director of the Advisory Committee on Civil Defense of the National Academy of Science and National Research Council.

From 1973 to 1985, Bascom served as director of the Southern California Coastal Water Research Project, funded by various city and county sewage districts. Bascom took the somewhat controversial view that human food waste in sewage could feed growing populations of fish. “In Los Angeles, one-third of the sewage solid waste went through garbage disposals, food that we might have eaten,” he once said. “But whether the food went through us or around us, it makes no difference to sea animals.”

In 1980, Bascom was awarded the Explorers Club Medal, its highest honor.

== Books ==
- A Hole in the Bottom of the Sea: The Story of the Mohole Project (1961) ISBN 0-385-00711-6
- Waves and Beaches: The Dynamics of the Ocean Surface Anchor Doubleday (1980), ISBN 0-385-14844-5 (Science Study Series)
- Deep Water, Ancient Ships: The Treasure Vault of the Mediterranean, ISBN 0-7153-7305-6
- The Crest of the Wave: Adventures in Oceanography (1988), ISBN 0-385-26633-2
- Great sea poetry, Compass Publications (1969)
