= O'Neill Sea Odyssey =

American non-profit organization

- Founded: 1996
- Founder: Jack O'Neill
- Type: California Non-Profit Corporation ID#77-0464784
- Purpose: Education, science, ecology, community service
- Location: Santa Cruz, California
- Region served: Santa Cruz County
- Method: Donations and Grants
- Key people: Jack O'Neill 1923-2017, founder and co-chair Bridget O'Neill, Board Chair; Rachel Kippen, Executive Director; Tim O'Neill, President and Skipper
- Employees: 11
- Website: www.oneillseaodyssey.org

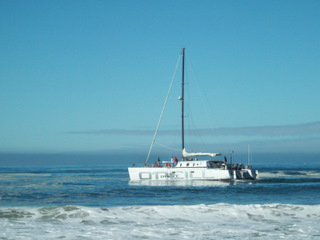
OSO Catamaran pulling out of the Santa Cruz Harbor

O'Neill Sea Odyssey is an American non-profit organization located in Santa Cruz, California (California Non-Profit Corporation ID#77-0464784). It was founded in 1996 by wetsuit innovator Jack O'Neill and provides students with hands-on lessons on marine habitat and the relationship between the oceans and the environment.

The program provides a free education course at the Santa Cruz Harbor to fourth to sixth-grade students, who typically come from economically disadvantaged backgrounds. The program's first executive director Dan Haifley has argued O'Neill Sea Odyssey's position that ocean concepts should be adopted in formal education standards and made more widely available to youth from economically disadvantaged backgrounds. Haifley retired in March, 2019 and Rachel Kippen took over the executive director position.

The core program takes place over a three-hour period on board a 65-foot (20 m) catamaran owned by Team O'Neill, and covers three areas; marine biology, ecology and navigation. Three quarters of teachers who enroll their classes in the program utilize the program's web-based classroom curriculum and educational materials both before and after the course. Over 100,000 students have passed through the program.

In December 2004, the program received the California Governor's Environmental and Economic Leadership Award in Children's Environmental Education and in May 2005, US senator Barbara Boxer presented the organization with her statewide Environmental Champion award. On August 22, 2009, the program's Adam Webster Memorial Fund received the Special Parents Information Network's Community Spinner Award for its work with special needs youth (www.spinsc.org). November 5, 2013, O'Neill Sea Odyssey was awarded the Impact Award from the Silicon Valley Business Journal. Executive Director Dan Haifley, along with University of California - Santa Cruz Distinguished Professor Gary Griggs, wrote a Sunday educational column for the Santa Cruz Sentinel entitled "Our Ocean Backyard" until April, 2019 when Kippen took over Haifley's turn writing.

In 2012 Crystal Birns, Arts Program Manager in Santa Cruz, California, and Doug Ross launched a Kickstarter project entitled "Seasons in the Sanctuary" to fund the creation of posters and pocketbooks showcasing different migratory bird species in the Monterey Bay. The project aimed to distribute the posters to the Santa Cruz wharf and classrooms in central California, and the pocket guide would be given to residents and visitors.

== Core curriculum ==
OSO's comprehensive curriculum can be found at: http://oneillseaodyssey.org/wp-content/themes/oneil/images/pdf/curriculum_english.pdf . It utilizes everyday principles and ocean concepts to emphasize federal and state education content standards: mathematics is demonstrated using navigational concepts such as triangulation, for example. In the early 2000s, OSO staff began bilingual instruction using funds from Community Foundation – Santa Cruz County, and curriculum published in Spanish and English. The curriculum is taught during the field trip after dividing the class into three groups using three learning stations both on the boat and in OSO's education center, summarized below.

=== Marine biology ===
Discussion includes the life cycles of plankton, their role in the food web and the unique chemical and physical balance that helps maintain life in the sea. Students participate in a hands-on plankton tow and the specimen is taken back to the classroom for further examination. A water sample is also taken back to test its salinity using a refractometer. When the students return to the lab, the samples from the plankton tow gathered on the boat are viewed through a microscope that is connected to a large-screen monitor. Students participate in plankton identification and discuss the different types of phytoplankton and zooplankton collected.

=== Ecology ===
Students learn information about the Monterey Bay Sanctuary's characteristics and marine life and habitats. Discussion includes the kelp forest, marine mammals, human influence on the marine habitat and related ecosystems, threats to the bay, and ideas for conservation and preservation. Visual aids are used to emphasize these concepts. A water sample is taken to learn about pH. Crab pods are pulled up each class so kids can view live creatures that might have settled in them, such as crabs and the occasional octopus. On the way back to the harbor, students count the number of otters in Black's Beach kelp forest and record this information on their data sheet. After the students return to the lab, an overview of the water cycle and watersheds is given. The water sample is tested for pH and the effect of pH on the ecosystem is discussed. Students discuss storm drains and how they relate to ocean pollution. Using a watershed model, examples of point source and non-point source pollution are demonstrated. Students are encouraged to conceptualize solutions to current environmental problems including landfill diversion, organic farming, reducing, reusing, recycling and alternate forms of transportation and energy.

=== Navigation ===
Students learn about electronic technology for navigation, triangulation, line-of-sight, use of magnetic hand-held compasses, and other elements of navigation. Hand-held compasses are used by the students to take 3 bearings on local landmarks. This information is recorded on a datasheet along with readings of wind speed, weather and depth as it relates to oceanic charts. Once back in the lab, the bearings taken on the boat are then plotted onto a chart of the Monterey Bay. Students learn how to read and decipher the signs, symbols and measurements on navigational charts. The class includes an introduction to navigational tools such as parallel rulers, globes and the compass rose. The instructor discusses latitude, longitude, basic geometry as it relates to triangulation and other elements of navigation.

== Past programs ==
The O'Neill Sea Odyssey has conducted a number of additional programs outside the core program including:

- San Jose Community Oceanography, a week-long program focused on watershed to the sea education for low-income youth.
- Ocean Scholars, ocean science mentorships for youth served by Familia Center serving low-income Latino families in Santa Cruz County.
- Project Discovery, an in depth overnight program with OSO aimed at low-income Oakland youth partnered with Henry Cowell Redwoods State Park.

== Community service projects ==
The community service portion encourages and rewards students to give back to their community. Each class that participates in the O'Neill Sea Odyssey program, is educated in common ways to start up community service projects (CSP)in school or in their respective communities. At OSO, there is an emphasis not only in educating the individual, but also giving the tools to the student as they participate in sharing their new community awareness outside the core program.

== In-class curriculum ==
OSO has provided activities and curricula to participating classrooms since 2002. Data collected during the field trip for each class is transferred to a database at the same website and each class accesses that data for follow-up lessons. Participating teachers and schools have used OSO curricula to design and implement comprehensive ocean science units into their classroom lesson plans. Since OSO's curriculum is aligned with national education standards teachers are able to reach the standards of the marine science curriculum.

== Adam Webster Memorial Fund ==
The Adam Webster Memorial Fund enables individuals with special needs to participate in O'Neill Sea Odyssey's ocean-based, hands-on education program. The fund was started by Adam's parents Tom and Judy Webster, after his death in June 1999. The vision of the Adam Webster Fund of the O'Neill Sea Odyssey is to provide a successful but not purely intellectual or academic learning experience for individuals with special needs in the context of the ocean environment. Special needs individuals may benefit from learning about navigation but perhaps just as much from feeling the rolling motion of the ocean as the wave movement stimulates the body and a sensory system that has been immobile and using a wheelchair for years.

The Special Parents Information Network (SPIN) has announced that on August 22, 2009, the Adam Webster Memorial Fund received the "Community Spinners" award at a ceremony in Watsonville for its work with special needs youth.

== Evaluations ==
Applied Survey Research (ASR), partnered with the United Way of Santa Cruz County, has celebrated the 15th year of the Community Assessment Project, (CAP) along with its evaluation of the O’Neill Sea Odyssey program for the 2008–2009 school year The report found that the free, ocean-going science and ecology program for area schools has a high impact especially among low-income youth. Among the ASR report's findings:

- The Student Survey showed that the OSO program was effective in promoting substantial increases in students’ environmental awareness. An average of 76% of students agreed with the survey questions regarding environmental knowledge and responsible behavior before participating in the program, compared to 97% after attending the program.
- When students were divided into “lower income” and “higher income” groups, survey results indicated that although both groups of students substantially increased their environmental knowledge after attending the program, the “lower income” students showed a greater amount of change and caught up with the “higher income” students by the end, with virtually all of the students agreeing with the survey questions (96% and 98%, respectively).

A study of the long-term impact of the program was conducted by San Jose State Master's candidate Lauren Hanneman, and was finished in Fall 2010. The report will be published in an upcoming issue of the Journal of Environmental Studies and Sciences and was summarized by the author:

- 75.1% of students who participated in the OSO fell into a certain mental model, indicating a long-term retention of knowledge and environmental education taught in the Ecology curriculum at OSO. It is also indicative that students’ believe that ocean pollution is largely land- based (attitude).
- Although the students do not indicate whether or not they litter, the students in Mental Model 4 indicate that they make the connection between litter and ocean pollution and studies have shown that increased knowledge and attitudes are the best indicators of intention to act (behavior).
- The only socio-demographic variables affecting students’ mental models were the community setting (distance from the ocean) and the number of other experiential environmental education fieldtrips the students attended. Income, gender, grade level, and language did not have a significant effect on students’ mental models.

== O'Neill Building ==
The OSO Education Center is located upstairs in what is known as the O'Neill Building at the Santa Cruz Harbor.

The historic building is where legendary suspense Film director Alfred Hitchcock sailed from, where Jack O’Neill's hot air balloons were prepared for flight and brought back for repairs. Wetsuits, sailing catamarans and dive equipment were also sold here while legendary parties and promotions were going on for the O’Neill brand.

In 2004, O’Neill Sea Odyssey (OSO) and the Santa Cruz Harbor renovated the building, with OSO taking the upstairs and the Harbor taking the downstairs. OSO got an education center to serve thousands of kids per year with the award-winning program and private tenant spaces with views of the Santa Cruz Harbor Channel and the Monterey Bay.

As the building was renovated, OSO continued its classes in a temporary facility on US Coast Guard land on the Harbor's west side. Donors supporting OSO's building renovation included the California Wildlife Conservation Board, Jack O’Neill, Harry Hind, the California Coastal Conservancy, The David and Lucile Packard Foundation, Balance Vector Inc., Robert Stephens and Julie Packard, Charles and Ann Walton, Jim and Debbie Thoits, Coast Commercial Bank, Tim and Bridget O’Neill, West Marine, Merrill and Lee Newman, Russ Rolfe Sr., Westcliff Foundation, Dan and Rebecca Haifley, Michael and Ann McCabe, Rob and Nancy Bremner, Nick Petredis, Jack McLaughlin, Shannon Brady and Donna Blitzer.

== Green Business Certified ==
The O'Neill Sea Odyssey has been Green Business Certified and is listed on Monterey Bay Green Business's web site. Because of OSO's dedication to reduce water consumption, use of alternate green energy sources, recycling, and reducing pollution it has qualified as a Green Business.

== Solar program ==
The goals of the OSO solar project are to:

- Reduce the carbon footprint
- Create clean recycled energy for O’Neill Sea Odyssey's education center and the Surfrider Foundation's Santa Cruz Chapter office and water testing laboratory
- Save money for both organizations

In addition to the Solar Program on land, the 65-foot (20 m) catamaran features solar panels and a wind turbine to create more clean energy while at sea, furthering the education of the students in the OSO core program.

“By reducing our carbon footprint and saving money, we will go green and save green,” said OSO Executive Director Dan Haifley. “Climate change impacts the ocean which in turn plays a role in moderating earth’s climate, so this will be a small contribution to keeping that balance healthy.”

The solar electric system generates about 3,700 kilowatt hours per year. It is estimated to pay for itself in 15 years. The grid-tied system includes 14 Sanyo HIP 195BA19 solar panels, among the most efficient solar panels available, and a 3000 watt AC output inverter. The solar electric system was designed by Solar Mike and installed by Ron Goad of Solar Construction. A $19,500 grant from the Ludwick Family Foundation of Glendora Los Angeles County paid for the majority of the solar electric system, along with cash rebate from California for about 25% of the system cost. OSO looks to be a leader in sustainable building while impacting youth awareness in future green technologies.

== Weather station ==
The O'Neill Sea Odyssey building is equipped with the most accurate weather report system, updating temperature, wind speed and direction, humidity and rain-fall.

New computer hardware and software feed the real-time data gathered by the instruments to the Internet.
