= Body Glove =

American brand of watersports clothing

Body Glove International, LLC
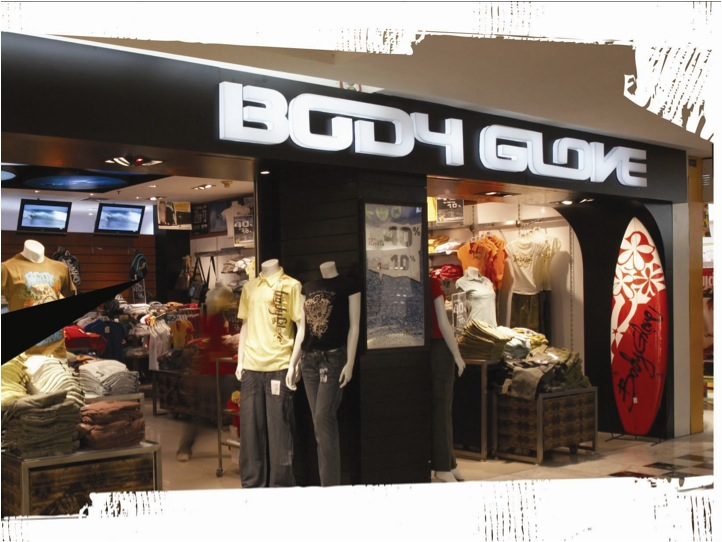
- Company type: Private
- Founded: 1953; 73 years ago
- Founders: Bill and Bob Meistrell
- Headquarters: Redondo Beach, California, U.S.
- Products: Apparel, sporting goods
- Parent: Marquee Brands
- Website: www.bodyglove.com

Body Glove is an American brand of watersports apparel and accessories that was founded in 1953 by twin brothers Bill and Bob Meistrell. The brothers are often credited with inventing the first practical wetsuit in the early 1950s in the back of their Redondo Beach, California, surf shop, Dive N' Surf. From those wetsuits, Body Glove branched out into other product categories. They now make wetsuits, swimsuits, clothing, shoes, life vests, sunglasses, wakeboards, paddle boards, towables, backpacks, phone cases and snorkeling equipment.

== History ==
Body Glove was started by Bill and Bob Meistrell in Redondo Beach, CA. They borrowed $1800 from their mother and each bought one third of the local sports shop called Dive N' Surf. Because the water was cold in the winter, they needed to find a way to stay in the water longer. In 1953, Bill Meistrell went to Bedford, Virginia, where he found the insulation used in the back of refrigerators, neoprene, and the first practical wetsuit was born.

In 2016 Marquee Brands acquired a 75% ownership stake in Body Glove, with the Meistrell family retaining 25% of the company.

== Sponsorship ==
The company's pro surfers include:

- Tatiana Weston-Webb
- Mo Freitas
- Alexander Gray
- Cheyne Magnusson
- Parker Coffin
- Conner Coffin
- Jesse Mendes
- Nolan Rapoza
- Tyler Gunther
- Dane Anderson
- Hunter Jones
- Emma Stone
- Ella McCaffray
- Rebecca Jamgochian
- Megan Ethell
- Eala Tomoda-Bannert

Past athletes include: Jamie O'Brien, Anthony Walsh, Nate Yeomans, Gabe Kling, Mike Losness, Holly Beck, Bruce Irons, and 2001 ASP World Tour Champion, C. J. Hobgood.

The company's pro wakeboarders include:

- Harley Clifford
- Bob Soven
- Rusty Malinoski
- Noah Flegel
- Keenan Flegel
- Taylor Dorey
- Tyler Higham
- Harley Clifford
