= Jack O'Neill (businessman) =

American businessman (1923–2017)

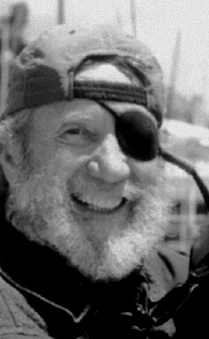
- O'Neill in 2010
- Born: March 27, 1923; Denver, Colorado, U.S.
- Died: June 2, 2017 (aged 94); Santa Cruz, California, U.S.
- Education: San Francisco State University
- Known for: Surfshop retailer; Founder of surf board/surf-wear brand O'Neill; Marine conservationist
- Spouse: Marjorie Bennett (died 1973)
- Children: 6

Jack O'Neill (March 27, 1923 – June 2, 2017) was an American businessman and founder of the surfwear and surfboard company O'Neill.

== Early life ==
O'Neill grew up in Oregon and Southern California, where he began body surfing in the late 1930s. He was a Navy pilot during World War II. O'Neill later moved to San Francisco in 1949 and earned a bachelor's degree in liberal arts at San Francisco State University.

== Career ==
In 1952, he founded the O'Neill brand while opening one of California's first surf shops in a garage on the Great Highway in San Francisco, close to his favorite bodysurfing break at the time. This led to the establishment of a company that deals in wetsuits, surf gear, and clothing. Jack O'Neill's name is attached to surfwear and his brand of surfing equipment. Although the invention of the wetsuit had often been attributed to O'Neill, he was not its inventor. An investigation concluded that UC Berkeley physicist Hugh Bradner was the inventor of the wetsuit.

In December 1996 he began a non-profit organization called O'Neill Sea Odyssey which provides students with hands-on lessons in marine biology and that teaches the relationship between the oceans and the environment. It has hosted about 100,000 children since it started.

== Personal life ==
He was married to Marjorie, who died in 1973, and they had six children.

O'Neill resided on a beachfront property in Santa Cruz, California, from 1959 until his death on June 2, 2017.

His granddaughter Uma O'Neill is a New Zealand-born equestrian rider, who represents that country and holds both New Zealand and American citizenships. She was selected to compete at the 2020 Summer Olympics.

== Awards ==
In 2002, O'Neill was an EY Entrepreneur of the Year Award recipient for the Northern California Region.
