= Wetsuit =

Garment worn to provide thermal protection while wet

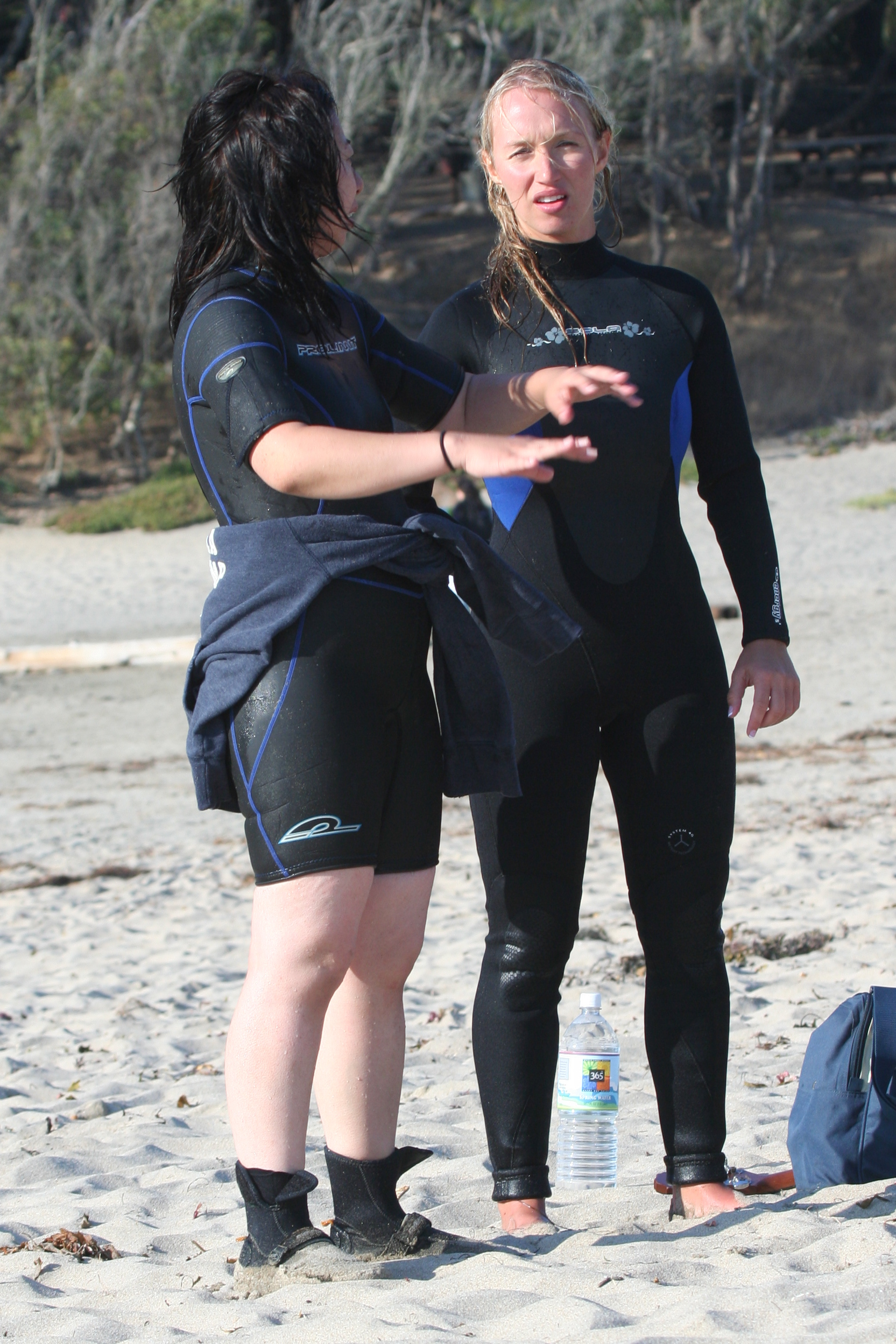
- Spring suit (shorty) and steamer (full suit) one-piece suits
- Uses: Thermal protection for water-sport and underwater work
- Related items: Diving suit, dry suit, hot water suit, rash guard

A wetsuit is a garment worn to provide thermal protection while wet. It is usually made of foamed neoprene, and is worn by surfers, divers, windsurfers, canoeists, and others engaged in water sports and other activities in or on the water. Its purpose is to provide thermal insulation and protection from abrasion, ultraviolet exposure, and stings from marine organisms. It also contributes extra buoyancy. The insulation properties of neoprene foam depend mainly on bubbles of gas enclosed within the material, which reduce its ability to conduct heat. The bubbles also give the wetsuit a low density, providing buoyancy in water.

Hugh Bradner, a University of California, Berkeley, physicist, invented the modern wetsuit in 1952. Wetsuits became available in the mid-1950s and evolved as the relatively fragile foamed neoprene was first backed, and later sandwiched, with thin sheets of tougher material such as nylon or later spandex (also known as lycra). Improvements in the way joints in the wetsuit were made by gluing, taping and blind-stitching, helped the suit to remain waterproof and reduce flushing, the replacement of water trapped between suit and body by cold water from the outside. Further improvements in the seals at the neck, wrists, ankles, and zippers produced a suit known as a "semi-dry".

Different types of wetsuit are made for different uses and for different temperatures. Suits range from a thin 2mm or less "shortie", covering just the torso, upper arm, and thighs, to thick 8mm semi-dry suit covering the torso, arms, and legs, usually complemented by neoprene boots, gloves and hood. The type of the suit depends upon the temperature of the water and the depth of the planned dive.

The difference between a wetsuit and a dry suit is that a wetsuit allows water to enter the suit, though good fit limits water circulation inside the suit, and between the inside and outside of the suit, while dry suits are designed to prevent water from entering, thus keeping the undergarments dry and preserving their insulating effectiveness. Wetsuits can give adequate protection in warm to moderately cold waters. Dry suits are typically more expensive and more complex to use, but can be used where protection from lower temperatures or contaminated water is needed.

== Uses ==
The primary function of a wetsuit is thermal insulation to keep the wearer warm in conditions where they would otherwise lose body heat rapidly due to heat transfer by relatively large quantities of water. Secondary, and incidental, functions are buoyancy and protection from some environmental hazards such as abrasion, sunburn, and to a lesser extent, wind chill. Wetsuits are used for thermal insulation for activities where the user is likely to be immersed in water, or frequently doused with heavy spray, often approaching from near-horizontal directions, where normal wet-weather clothing is unlikely to keep the water out. Activities include underwater diving, sailing, sea rescue operations, surfing, river rafting, whitewater kayaking and in some circumstances, endurance swimming.

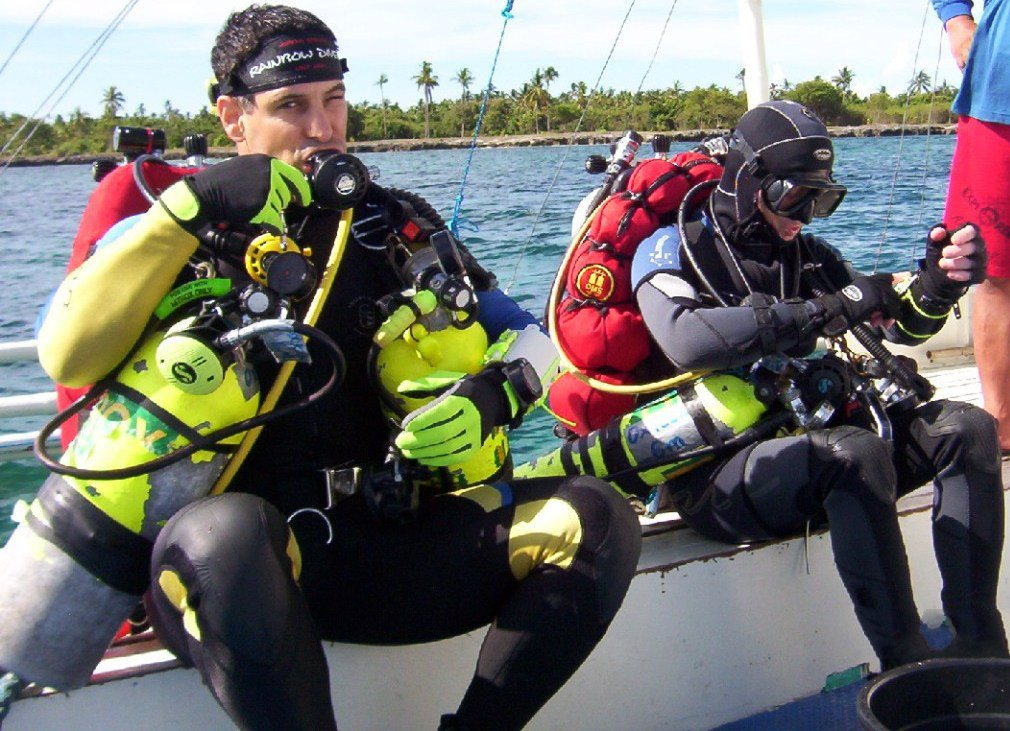
Scuba divers in one-piece full-length wetsuits, one wearing a hood

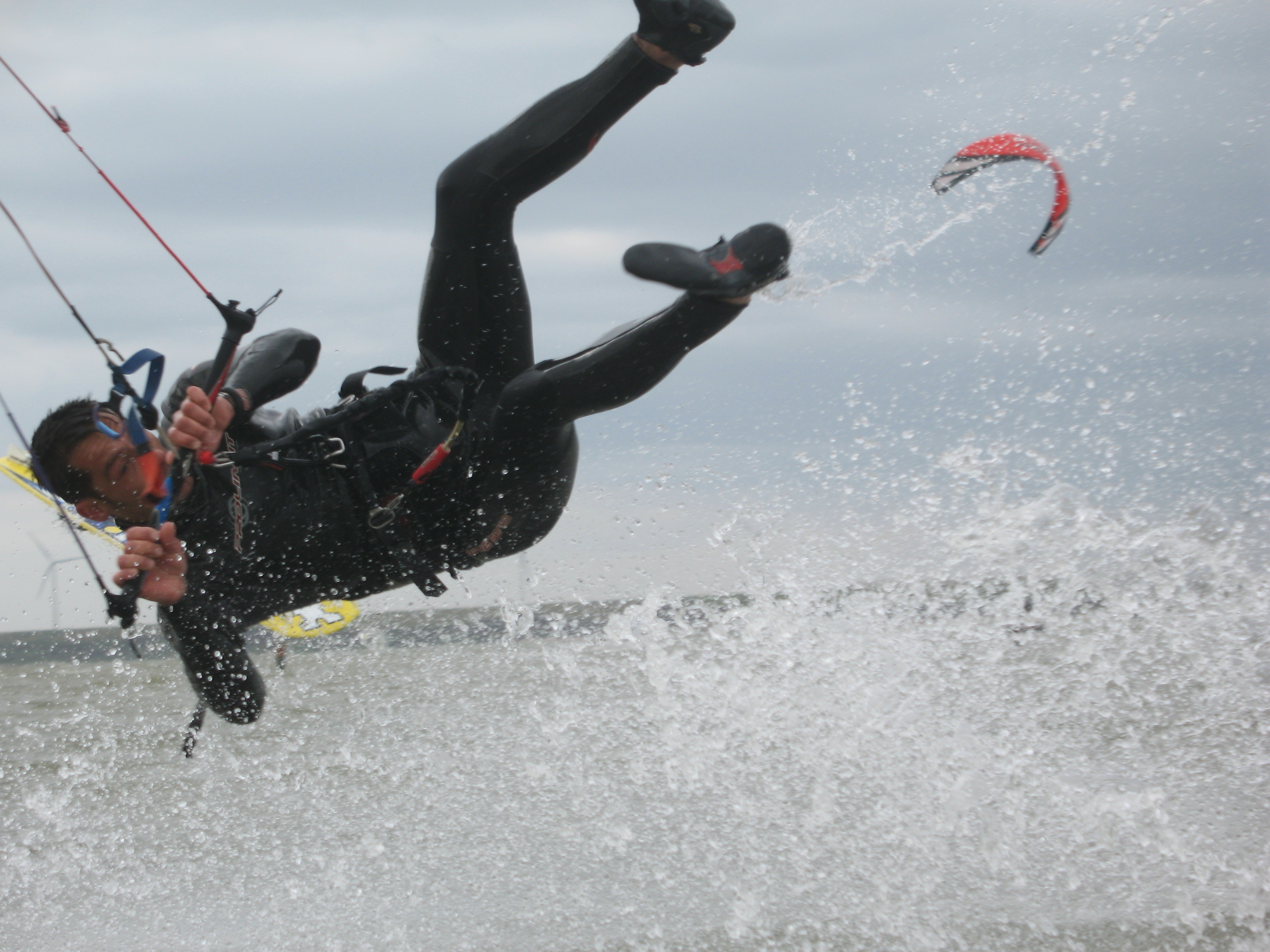
One-piece suit worn by kitesurfer

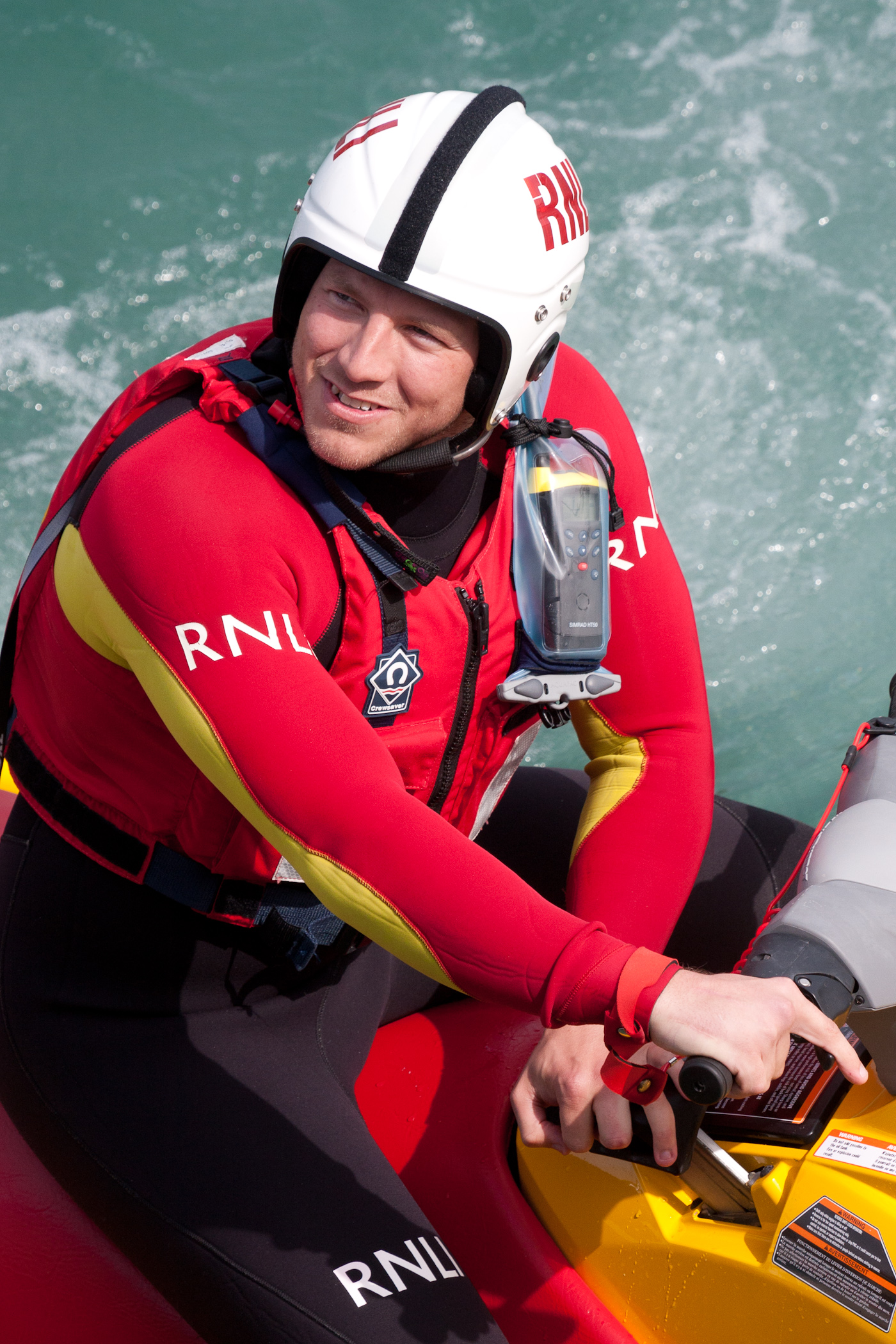
High visibility suit for sea rescue

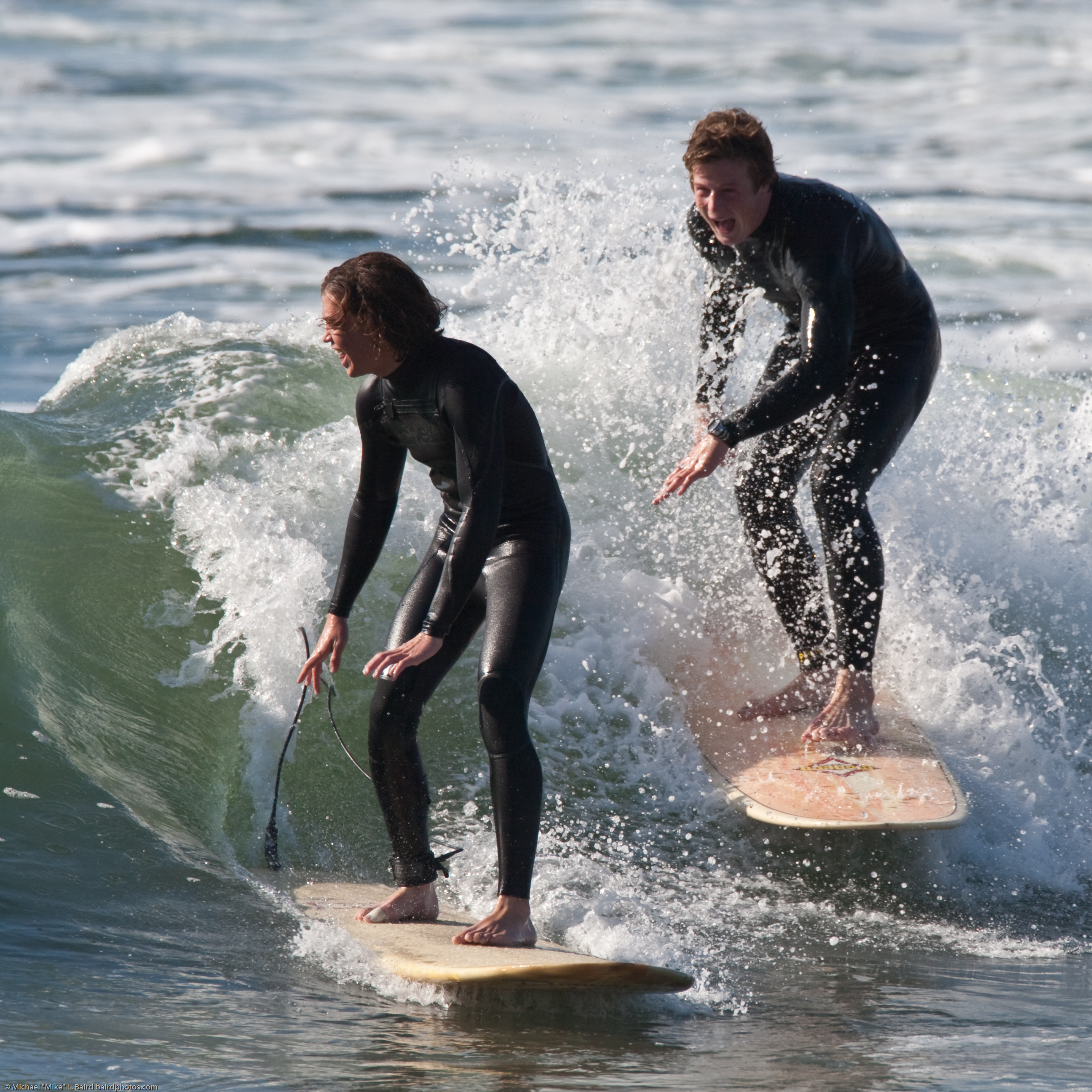
Surfers in full one-piece wetsuits

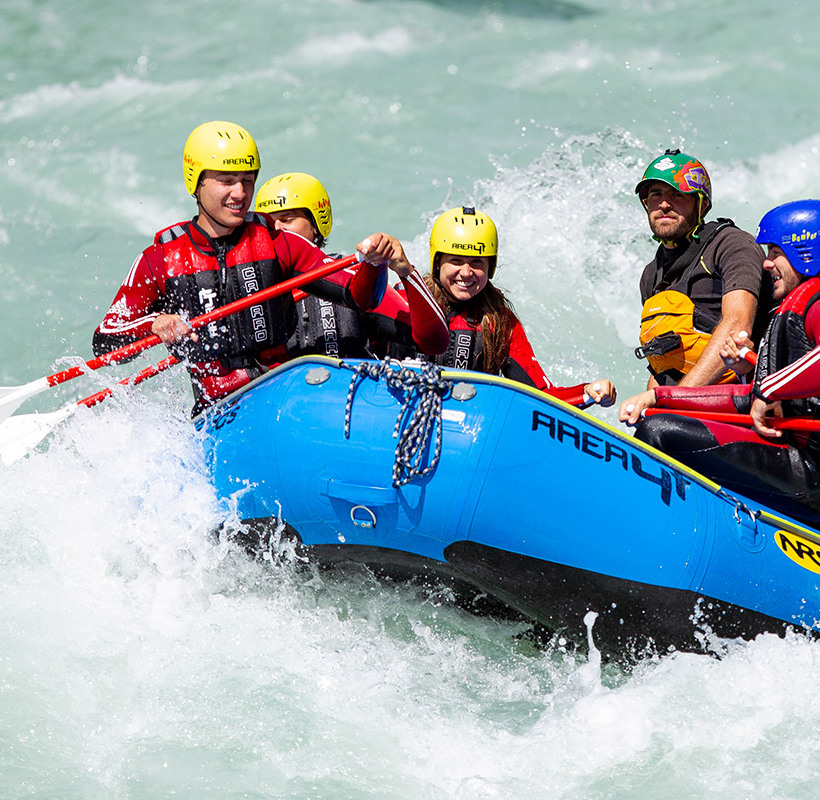
In rafting, wetsuits protect against the cold and cuts and abrasion from collision with rocks after falling off

== Insulation ==
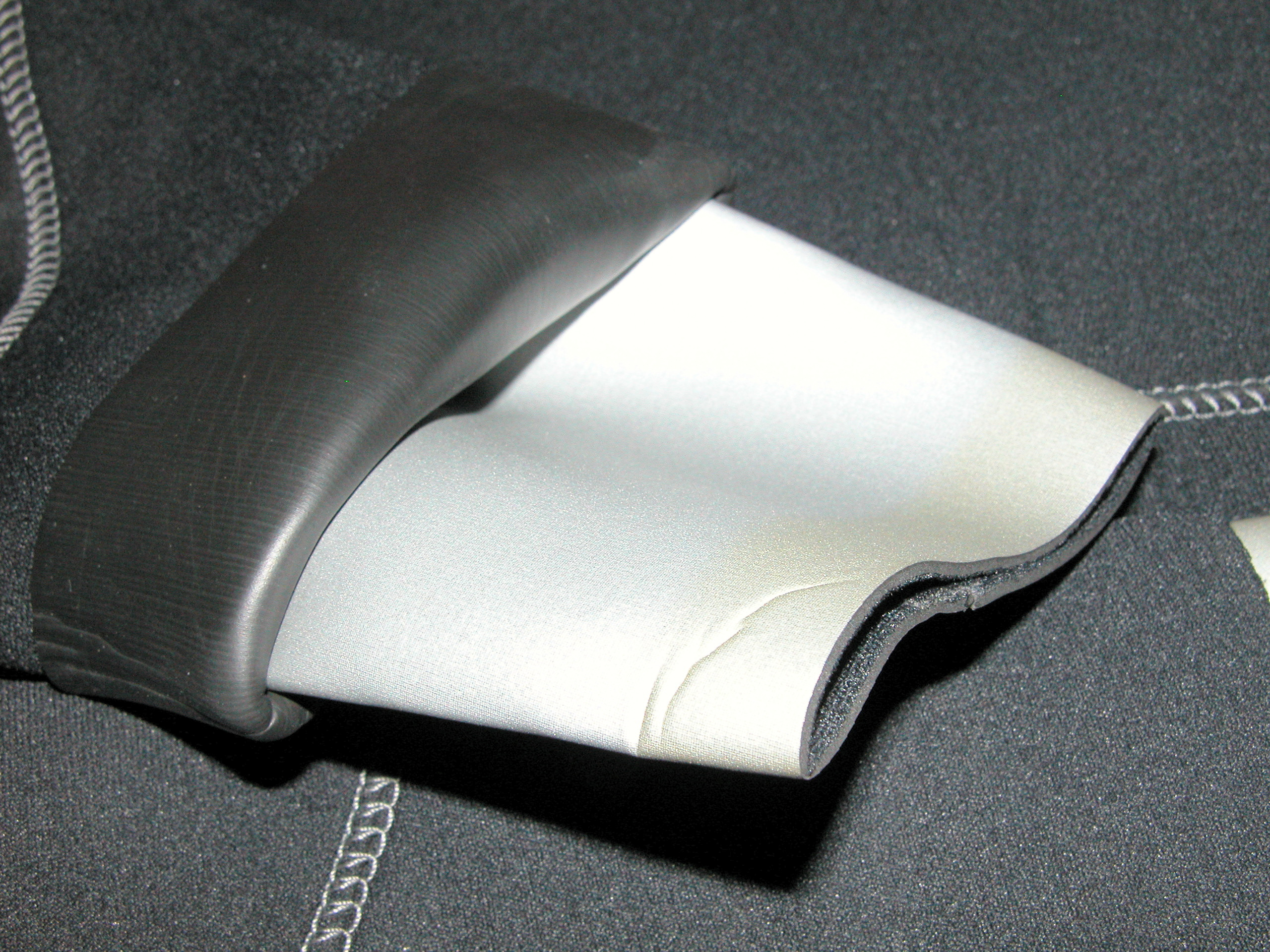
Semi-dry cuffs use a smooth surface to seal against the skin to reduce flushing.

Still water (without currents or convection) conducts heat away from the body by pure thermal diffusion, approximately 20 to 25 times more efficiently than still air. Water has a thermal conductivity of 0.58 Wm^{−1}K^{−1} while still air has a thermal conductivity of 0.024 Wm^{−1}K^{−1}, so an unprotected person can eventually succumb to hypothermia even in warmish water on a warm day. Wetsuits are made of closed-cell foam neoprene, a synthetic rubber that contains small bubbles of nitrogen gas when made for use as insulating material (neoprene is also manufactured without foaming for many other applications where insulating qualities are not important). Nitrogen, like most gases, has very low thermal conductivity compared to water or to solids, (Note: Nitrogen has a thermal conductivity of 0.024 Wm^{−1}K^{−1}, the same as air – "Thermal conductivity of some common materials". The Engineering ToolBox. 2005.) and the small and enclosed nature of the gas bubbles minimizes heat transport through the gas by convection in the same way that cloth fabrics, fur, or feathers insulate by reducing convection of enclosed air spaces. The result is that the gas-filled cavities restrict heat transfer to mostly conduction, which is partly through bubbles of entrapped gas, thereby greatly reducing heat transfer from the body (or from the layer of warmed water trapped between the body and the wetsuit) to the colder water surrounding the wetsuit.

Uncompressed foam neoprene has a typical thermal conductivity in the region of 0.054 Wm^{−1}K^{−1}, which produces about twice the heat loss of still air, or one-tenth the loss of water. However, at a depth of about 15 metres (50 ft) of water, the thickness of a typical neoprene foam will be halved and its conductivity will be increased by about 50%, allowing heat to be lost at three times the rate at the surface. The grade of foam neoprene strongly affects insulating properties at depth, and over time. Softer, lighter, and more elastic grades contain a higher percentage of gas bubbles, and are comfortable and provide effective insulation at or near the surface where they retain much of their thickness. Areas that are significantly stretched lose thickness even before they are compressed at depth, which also reduces the insulation, and long periods under pressure and repeated compression and decompression of the neoprene foam will eventually lead to loss of volume, insulation, buoyancy and flexibility. Some bubbles will also rupture under stress and lose their gas, and the foam will start to absorb more water, further reducing insulation. Wetsuits for diving should be made from less compressible neoprene to keep their insulating qualities.

A wetsuit must have a snug fit to work efficiently when immersed; too loose a fit, particularly at the openings (wrists, ankles, neck and overlaps) will allow cold water from the outside to enter when the wearer moves. Flexible seals at the suit cuffs aid in preventing heat loss in this fashion. The elasticity of the foamed neoprene and surface textiles allow enough stretch for many people to effectively wear off-the-shelf sizes, but others have to have their suits custom fitted to get a good fit that is not too tight for comfort and safety. Places where the suit bridges a hollow tend to change volume when the wearer bends that part of the body, and the change in volume of the space under the suit works as a pump to push warm water out of the suit and suck cold water in on the opposite movement.

== Buoyancy ==
Foamed neoprene is very buoyant, helping swimmers to stay afloat, and for this reason divers need to carry extra weight based on the volume of their suit to achieve neutral buoyancy near the surface. Buoyancy is reduced by compression, and is proportional to depth and the amount of gas in the bubbles, and scuba divers can correct this by inflating the buoyancy compensator. Breath-hold divers do not have this option and have the handicap of reduced buoyancy at depth due to lung gas compression in addition to suit volume loss. The suit also loses thermal protection as the bubbles in the neoprene are compressed at depth. (Note: Non-foamed solid neoprene has a thermal conductivity between 0.15 Wm^{−1}K^{−1} and 0.45 Wm^{−1}K^{−1} depending on type, not very different from water – Elert, Glenn (2008). "Conduction". The Physics Hypertextbook.)

Measurements of volume change of neoprene foam used for wetsuits under hydrostatic compression shows that about 30% of the volume, and therefore 30% of surface buoyancy, is lost in about the first 10 m, another 30% by about 60 m, and the volume appears to stabilize at about 65% loss by about 100 m. The total buoyancy loss of a wetsuit is proportional to the initial uncompressed volume. An average person has a surface area of about 2 m^{2}, so the uncompressed volume of a full one piece 6 mm thick wetsuit will be in the order of 1.75 x 0.006 = 0.0105 m^{3}, or roughly 10 liters. The mass will depend on the specific formulation of the foam, but will probably be in the order of 4 kg, for a net buoyancy of about 6 kg at the surface. Depending on the overall buoyancy of the diver, this will generally require 6 kg of additional weight to bring the diver to neutral buoyancy to allow reasonably easy descent. The volume lost at 10 m is about 3 liters, or 3 kg of buoyancy, rising to about 6 kg buoyancy lost at about 60 m. This could nearly double for a large person wearing a farmer-john and jacket for cold water. This loss of buoyancy must be balanced by inflating the buoyancy compensator to maintain neutral buoyancy at depth.

There is also a buoyancy loss due to gas loss from the bubbles over time, and the neoprene also loses flexibility with time, and tends to stiffen and shrink. This tendency is exacerbated by frequent use, deep dives, and exposure to sunlight. The "compressed" or "crushed" neoprene used for hot water suits and dry suits is permanently reduced in volume by intentional hydrostatic compression during the manufacturing process, specifically to reduce buoyancy change with depth, at the cost of reducing insulation.

== History ==
=== Origins ===
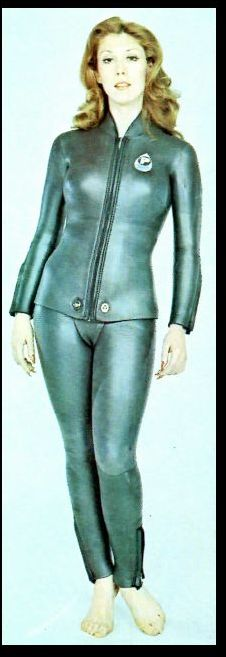
Woman wearing "smoothskin" wetsuit with "beavertail" and twistlock fasteners

In 1952, UC Berkeley and subsequent UC San Diego SIO physicist Hugh Bradner, who is considered to be the original inventor and "father of the modern wetsuit," had the insight that a thin layer of trapped water could be tolerated between the suit fabric and the skin, so long as sufficient insulation was present in the fabric of the suit. In this case, the water would quickly reach skin temperature and gas bubbles in the fabric would continue to act as the thermal insulation to keep it that way. In the popular mind, the layer of water between skin and suit has been credited with providing the insulation, but Bradner clearly understood that the suit did not need to be wet because it was not the water that provided the insulation but rather the gas in the suit fabric. He initially sent his ideas to Lauriston C. "Larry" Marshall who was involved in a U.S. Navy/National Research Council Panel on Underwater Swimmers. However, it was Willard Bascom, an engineer at the Scripps Institution of Oceanography in La Jolla, California, who suggested foamed neoprene as a feasible material to Bradner.

Bradner and Bascom were not overly interested in profiting from their design and were unable to successfully market a version to the public. They attempted to patent their neoprene wetsuit design, but their application was rejected because the design was viewed as too similar to a flight suit. The United States Navy also turned down Bradner's and Bascom's offer to supply its swimmers and frogmen with the new wetsuits due to concerns that the gas in the neoprene component of the suits might make it easier for naval divers to be detected by underwater sonar. The first written documentation of Bradner's invention was in a letter to Marshall, dated June 21, 1951.

Jack O'Neill started using closed-cell neoprene foam which he claimed was shown to him by his bodysurfing friend, Harry Hind, who knew of it as an insulating material in his laboratory work. After experimenting with the material and finding it superior to other insulating foams, O'Neill founded the successful wetsuit manufacturing company called O'Neill in a San Francisco garage in 1952, later relocating to Santa Cruz, California in 1959 with the motto "It's Always Summer on the Inside". Bob and Bill Meistrell, from Manhattan Beach, California, also started experimenting with neoprene around 1953. They started a company which would later be named Body Glove.

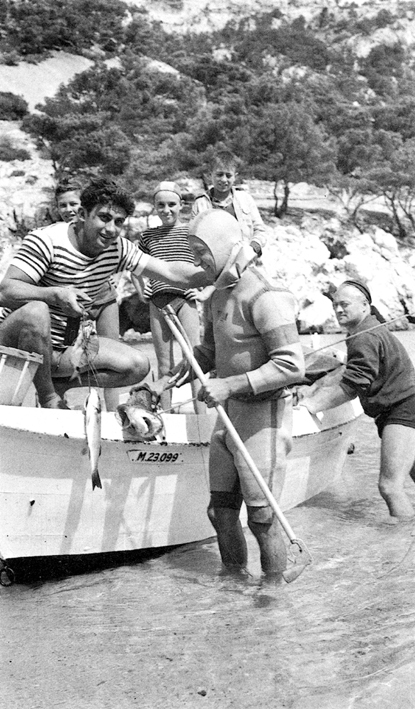
French diving gear manufacturer Georges Beuchat wearing the "isothermic" sponge-rubber wetsuit he invented in 1953

Neoprene was not the only material used in early wetsuits, particularly in Europe and Australia. The Pêche-Sport "isothermic" suit invented by Georges Beuchat in 1953 and the UK-made Siebe Gorman Swimsuit were both made out of sponge rubber. The Heinke Dolphin Suit of the same period, also made in England, came in a green male and a white female version, both manufactured from natural rubber lined with stockinet. As early as July 1951, underwater hunters in Australia were experimenting with a natural rubber wetsuit "of a 'wrap on' variety, which does not set out to be 100% waterproof (but it is claimed that) the leakage of water through it is so slow that body warmth under it is maintained for hours." By May 1953, the Bondi underwater equipment manufacturer Undersee Products was already distributing this singlet-like design commercially to Australian sporting goods stores, where it was described thus: "Made from heavy sheet rubber, the Sealskin suit is most effective when worn over a football jersey. When jersey becomes wet, rubber holds it firmly against body and thus warmth is generated. Water circulation automatically stops and body warmth builds up in moisture-laden jersey. The Seaskin suit provides both underwater insulation and above-water wind protection".

=== Development of suit design ===
Initially, wetsuits were crafted solely from foam-rubber or neoprene sheets devoid of any supporting material. Such suits demanded cautious handling during wear due to the inherent fragility and stickiness of foam-rubber against the skin. Excessive stretching and pulling often resulted in tearing these suits apart. To mitigate this issue, divers resorted to generously applying talc powder to both the suit and their body to facilitate smoother sliding of the rubber material.

Backing materials first arrived in the form of nylon knit cloth applied to one side of the neoprene. This allowed a swimmer to pull on the suit relatively easily since the nylon took most of the stress of pulling on the suit, and there was less friction between the nylon and skin, but the suit still had the bare foam exposed on the outside and the nylon was relatively stiff, limiting flexibility. A small strip of neoprene reversed with the rubber against the skin could help provide a sealing surface to keep water out around the neck, wrists, and ankles.

In 1960, the British Dunlop Sports Company brought out its yellow Aquafort neoprene wetsuit, whose high visibility was intended to improve diver safety. However, the line was discontinued after a short while and wetsuits reverted to their black uniformity. The colorful wetsuits seen more recently first arrived in the 1970s when double-backed neoprene was developed. In this material the foam-rubber is sandwiched between two protective fabric outer layers, greatly increasing the tear-resistance. An external layer also meant that decorative colors, logos, and patterns could be made with panels and strips sewn into various shapes. This change from bare flat black rubber to full color took off in the 1980s with brilliant fluorescent colors common on many suits.

=== Improvements in suit assembly ===
The first suits used traditional sewing methods to simply overlap two strips of rubber and sew them together. In a rubber wetsuit, this does not work well for a number of reasons, the main one being that punching holes straight through both layers of foam for the thread opens up passages for water to flow in and out of the suit. The second problem is that the stretching of the foam tended to enlarge the needle holes when the suit was worn. This meant that a wetsuit could be very cold all along the seams of the suit. And although the sewn edge did hold the two pieces together, it could also act as a perforated tear edge, making the suit easier to tear along the seams when putting it on and taking it off.

When nylon-backed neoprene appeared, the problem of the needle weakening the foam was solved, but still the needle holes leaked water along the seams.

==== Seam taping ====
To deal with all these early sewing problems, taping of seams was developed. The tape is a strong nylon cloth with a very thin but solid waterproof rubber backing. The tape is applied across the seam and bonded either with a chemical solvent or with a hot rolling heat-sealer to melt the tape into the neoprene.

With this technology, the suit could be sewn and then taped, and the tape would cover the sewing holes as well as providing some extra strength to prevent tearing along the needle holes.

When colorful double-backed designer suits started appearing, taping moved primarily to the inside of the suit because the tape was usually very wide, jagged, black, and ugly, and was hidden within the suit and out of sight.

Many 1960s and 1970s wetsuits were black with visible yellow seam taping. The yellow made the divers more easily seen in dark low-visibility water. To prevent needle holes from leaking, O'Neill fabricators developed a seam-tape which combined a thin nylon layer with a polyester hemming tape. Applied over the interior of the glued & sewn seam, then anneal bonded with a hand held teflon heating iron produced a seam that was both securely sealed and much stronger.

==== Seam gluing ====
Another alternative to sewing was to glue the edges of the suit together. This created a smooth, flat surface that did not necessarily need taping, but, raw foam glued to foam is not a strong bond and still prone to tearing.

Most early wetsuits were fabricated completely by hand, which could lead to sizing errors in the cutting of the foam sheeting. If the cut edges did not align correctly or the gluing was not done well, there might still be water leakage along the seam.

Initially, suits could be found as being sewn only, glued only, taped only, then also sewn and taped, or glued and taped, or perhaps all three.

==== Blindstitching ====
Sometime after nylon-backed neoprene appeared, the blind stitch method was developed. A blindstitch sewing machine uses a curved needle, which does not go all the way through the neoprene but just shallowly dips in behind the fabric backing, crosses the glue line, and emerges from the surface on the same side of the neoprene. This is similar to the overlock stitching used for teeshirts and other garments made from knitted fabrics.

The curved needle allows the fabric backing to be sewn together without punching a hole completely through the neoprene, and thereby eliminating the water-leakage holes along the seam. Blindstitch seams also lay flat, butting up the edge of one sheet against another, allowing the material to lay flatter and closer to the skin. For these reasons blindstitching rapidly became the primary method of sewing wetsuits together, with other stitching methods now used mainly for decorative or stylistic purposes.

=== Further advances in suit design ===
Highly elastic fabrics such as spandex (also known as lycra) have mostly replaced plain nylon backing, since the nylon knit fabric cannot be stretched as much as when elasticised with lycra fibres. Incorporating lycra into the backing permits a larger amount of stretching that does not damage the suit, and allowed suits to be stretched more to fit while remaining acceptably comfortable, making the tailoring less critical.

After the development of double-backed neoprene, singled-backed neoprene still has its uses. A narrow edge strip of smooth surfaced single-backed neoprene wrapped around the leg, neck, and wrist openings of the suit creates a more effective seal against the skin than the knit fabric backing, that reduces the flushing of water in and out of the suit at these places as the person moves. Since the strip is narrow, it does not drag on the skin of the wearer much and the lining makes the suit easy to put on and remove. The strip can also be fitted with the smooth side out and folded under to form a seal with a small length of smooth surface against the skin and slightly greater contact pressure. This type of seal can also be used on neoprene dry suits as it is sufficiently watertight when properly designed.

In the early 1970s Gul Wetsuits pioneered the one-piece wetsuit named the 'steamer' because of the visible condensed water vapour given off from the suit when taken off, allowing heat and water held inside to escape. One-piece wetsuits are still sometimes referred to as 'steamers'.

As wetsuit manufacturers continued to develop suit designs, they found ways that the materials could be further optimized and customized. The O'Neill "Animal Skin" created in 1974 by then Director of Marketing, E.J. Armstrong, was one of the first designs combining a turtle-neck based on the popular Sealsuit with a flexible lightweight YKK horizontal zipper across the back shoulders similar in concept to the inflatable watertight Supersuit (developed by Jack O'Neill in the late 1960s). The "Animal Skin" eventually evolved molded rubber patterns bonded onto the exterior of the neoprene sheeting (a technique E.J. Armstrong developed for application of the moulded raised rubber Supersuit logo to replace the standard flat decals). This has been carried on as stylized reinforcing pads of rubber on the knees and elbows to protect the suit from wear, and allows logos to be directly bonded onto raw sheet rubber. Additionally, the "Animal Skin's" looser fit allowed for the use of a supplemental vest in extreme conditions.

More recently, manufacturers have experimented by combining various materials with neoprene for additional warmth or flexibility of their suits. These include, but are not limited to, spandex, and wool.

Companies, such as Patagonia, have been recycling the material from older worn wetsuits and remodeling them into a low-carbon wetsuit.

Precision computer-controlled cutting and assembly methods, such as water-jet cutting, have allowed ever greater levels of seam precision, permitting designers to use many small individual strips of different colors while still keeping the suit free of bulging and ripples from improper cutting and misaligned sewing. Further innovations in CAD (Computer Aided Design) technology allow precision cutting for custom-fit wetsuits.

=== Return of single-backed neoprene ===
As wetsuits continued to evolve, their use was explored in other sports such as open-water swimming and triathlons. Although double-backed neoprene is strong, the cloth surface is relatively rough and creates a large amount of drag in the water, slowing down the swimmer. A single-backed suit has a smoother exterior surface which causes less drag. With the advances of elastic Lycra backings and blindstitching, single-backed neoprene suits could be made that outperformed the early versions from the 1970s. Other developments in single-backed wetsuits include the suits designed for free-diving and spearfishing. Single lined neoprene is more flexible than double lined. To achieve flexibility and low bulk for a given warmth of suit, they are unlined inside, and the slightly porous raw surface of the neoprene adheres closely to the skin and reduces flushing of the suit. The lined outer surface may be printed with camouflage patterns for spearfishing and is more resistant to damage while in use.

Some triathlon wetsuits go further, and use rubber-molding and texturing methods to roughen up the surface of the suit on the forearms, to increase drag and help pull the swimmer forwards through the water. Extremely thin 1 mm neoprene is also often used in the under-arm area, to decrease stretch resistance and reduce strain on the swimmer when they extend their arms out over their head.

Wetsuits used for caving are often single-backed with a textured surface known as "sharkskin" which is a thin layer where the neoprene is less expanded. This makes it more abrasion resistant for squeezing between rocks and doesn't get torn in the way that fabric does.

Another reason to eliminate the external textile backing is to reduce water retention which can increase evaporative cooling and wind chill in suits used mainly out of the water.

== Types ==
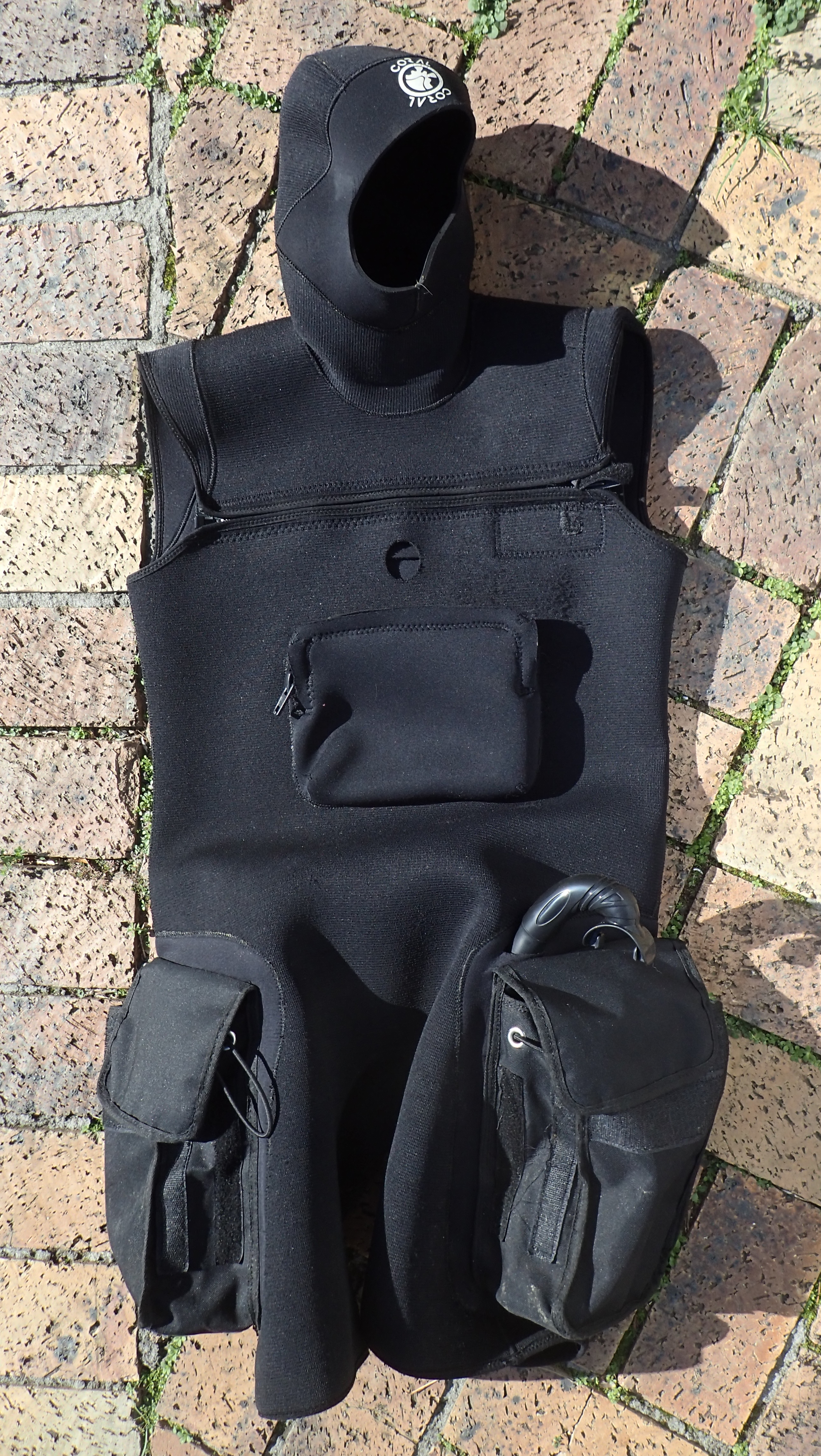
Hooded tunic with cargo pockets

=== Configurations ===
Various configurations of wetsuit are available, with varied amounts of body coverage. Most can be worn alone or in combinations to suit the conditions:

- A sleeveless vest, covering only the torso, provides minimal coverage. Some include an attached hood. These are not usually intended to be worn alone, but as an extra layer over or under a longer wetsuit.
- A hooded tunic, covering the torso and head, with short legs and either short or no sleeves, is generally intended to be worn over a full suit, and has a zip closure. It may be fitted with pockets for transporting accessories.
- A jacket covers the torso and arms, with little to no coverage for the legs. Some jackets have short legs like a shorty, others feature leg holes similar to a woman's swimsuit. A third style, the beavertail or bodysuit, has a flap which passes through the crotch and attaches at the front with clips, toggles or velcro fasteners. It is worn with (over) or without a long john or trousers. A jacket may include an integral hood, and may have a full or partial front zipper.
- A spring suit covers the torso and has short or long sleeves and short legs.
- Trousers cover the lower torso and legs.
- A short john, shorty covers the torso and legs to the knee only; does not have sleeves and is a short legged version of the long john.
- A long john, johnny, johnny suit, or farmer john/jane (depending on the gender the suit is designed for) covers the torso and legs only; it resembles a bib overall, hence the nickname.
- A full suit or steamer covers the torso and the full length of the arms and legs. Some versions come with sleeves the length of a standard t-shirt and known as a short-sleeved steamer.

Some suits are arranged in two parts; the jacket and long johns can be worn separately in mild conditions or worn together to provide two layers of insulation around the torso in cold conditions. Typically, two-piece cold water wetsuits have 10 to 14 mm combined thickness of neoprene over the torso and 5 to 7 mm single thickness over the limbs.

=== Thickness ===
Wetsuits are available in different thicknesses depending on the conditions for which they are intended. The neoprene foam is available in thicknesses up to 10 mm, though 7 mm and less are most common. The thicker the suit, the warmer it will keep the wearer, but the more it will restrict movement. Because wetsuits offer significant protection from jellyfish, coral, sunburn and other hazards, many divers opt to wear a thin suit which provides minimal insulation (sometimes called a "bodysuit" or dive skins) even when the water is warm enough to comfortably forego insulating garments. A thick suit will restrict mobility, and as the thickness is increased the suit may become impractical, depending on the application. This is one reason why dry suits may be preferable for some applications. A wetsuit is normally specified in terms of its thickness and style. For instance, a wetsuit with a torso thickness of 5 mm and a limb thickness of 3 mm will be described as a "5/3". With new technologies the neoprene is getting more flexible. Modern 4/3 wetsuits, for instance, may feel as flexible as a 3/2 of only a few years ago. Some suits have extra layers added for key areas such as the lower back. Improved flexibility may come at the cost of greater compressibility, which reduces insulation at depth, but this is only important for diving.

=== Surface finish ===
Foam neoprene used for wetsuits is always closed cell, in that the gas bubbles are mostly not connected to each other inside the neoprene. This is necessary to prevent water absorption, and the gas bubbles do most of the insulation. Thick sheets of neoprene are foamed inside a mould, and the surfaces in contact with the mould take on the inverse texture of the mould surfaces. In the early days of wetsuits this was often a diamond pattern or similar, but can also be slick and smooth for low drag and quick drying. The cut surfaces of the foam have a slightly porous mat finish as the cutting process passes through a large number of bubbles, leaving what is called an open cell surface finish, but the bulk of the foam remains closed cell. The open cell finish is the most stretchy and the least tear resistant. It is relatively form fitting and comfortable on the skin, but the porosity encourages bacterial growth if not well washed after use, and the foam surface does not slide freely against skin unless lubricated.

==== Wetsuit lining ====
The cut surfaces are usually bonded to a synthetic knit fabric, which provides much greater tear resistance, at the expense of some loss of flexibility and stretch. This fabric can be bonded to one or both surfaces in various combinations of composition, weave, weight and colour, and can be thin and relatively smooth and fragile, thicker and stronger and less stretchy, for high wear areas, or a plush type liner to reduce water flow. Merino wool liner fabrics have also been used. Fabric lined on one side only is more flexible than double lined. After slicing the foam slab down to the required thickness, a layer of glue is applied and the chosen lining is pressed down by the lamination rollers. A more flexible lining is chosen for most applications. Neoprene foam is also available with kevlar reinforced fabric facing for high cut and abrasion resistance. This is used for reinforcing high wear areas like knee pads.

A wetsuit with a very smooth and somewhat delicate outer surface known as smoothskin, which is the original outer surface of the foamed neoprene block from which the sheets are cut, is used for long-distance swimming, triathlon, competitive apnoea, and bluewater spearfishing. These are designed to maximize the mobility of the limbs while providing both warmth and buoyancy, but the surface is delicate and easily damaged. The slick surface also dries quickly and is least affected by wind chill when out of the water.

Both smoothskin and fabric lined surfaces can be printed to produce colour patterns such as camouflage designs, which may give spearfishermen and combat divers an advantage.

=== Closures ===
Video of a man putting on a 3 mm shorty. During closing the back zipper and the velcro securing it, he has some difficulties typical for this configuration, and where a second person can be of great help.

Zippers are often used for closure or for providing a close fit at the wrists and ankles while remaining relatively easy to put on and remove, but they also provide leakage points for water A backing flap reduces leakage but can get caught in the zipper while closing. Jackets may have a full or partial front zipper, or none at all. Full body suits may have a vertical back zipper, a cross-shoulder zipper, a vertical front zipper or occasionally a cross-chest zipper. Each of these arrangements has some advantages and some disadvantages:

- The vertical front zipper is easy to operate, but the suit may be difficult to remove from the shoulders without assistance, and the zip is uncomfortable for lying on a surfboard. It is relatively inflexible and placed over a part of the body where a lot of flexibility is desirable. The top of the closure will leak to some extent. The top end of the zip may be easily opened for comfort when the wearer is warm, but the zip may also press into the throat, which can be uncomfortable.
- Cross shoulder zipper can be made relatively watertight as it has no free ends, and is therefore used in semi-dry wetsuits. It is difficult to operate for the wearer and relatively highly stressed at the shoulders due to arm movement. The zip is also relatively vulnerable to damage from diving harnesses.
- Cross chest zipper has similar advantages to cross shoulder, but is easy for the wearer to reach and operate. The zipper is subjected to sharper bends at the shoulders than other arrangements.
- Vertical back zippers are possibly the most common arrangement as they can be operated with a lanyard. They are relatively comfortable for most applications, the suit is easy to remove, and they place the zipper directly over the spine, which though flexible in bending, does not change much in length. The top of the closure will leak to some extent.

=== Sizing and fit ===
Wetsuits that fit too tightly can cause difficulty breathing or even acute cardiac failure, and a loose fit allows considerable flushing which reduces effectiveness of insulation, so a proper fit is important. The quality of fit is most important for diving as this is where the thickest suits are used and the heat loss is potentially greatest. A diving wetsuit should touch the skin over as much of the body that it covers as comfortably possible, both when the wearer is relaxed and when exercising. This is difficult to achieve and the details of style and cut can affect the quality of fit. Gaps where the suit does not touch the skin will vary in volume as the diver moves and this is a major cause of flushing.

Wetsuits are made in several standard adult sizes and for children. Custom fitted suits are produced by many manufacturers to provide a better fit for people for whom a well fitting off-the shelf suit is not available.

=== Semi-dry suits ===
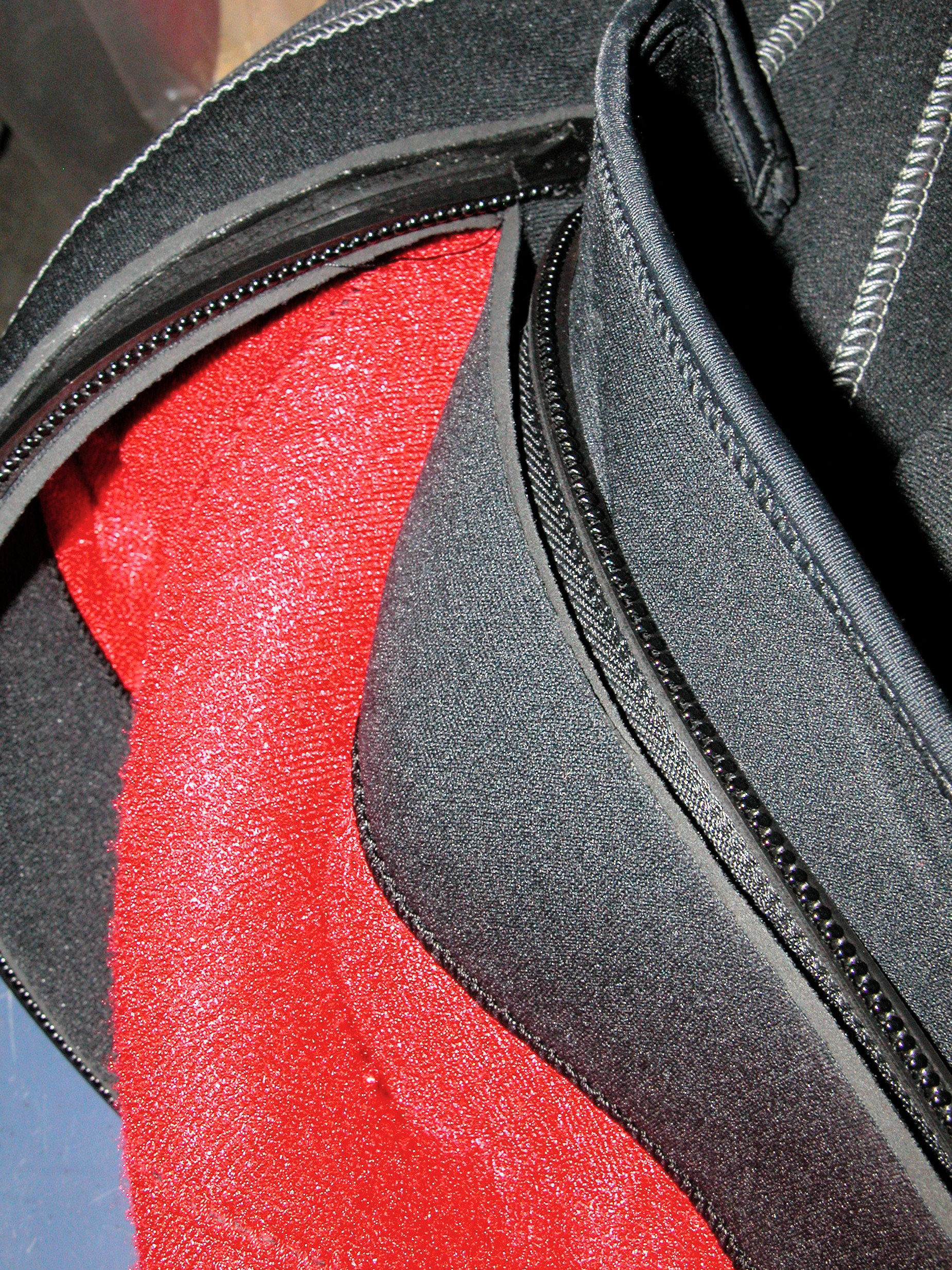
Detail showing zipper attachment, internal flap and cover flap of semi-dry suit. This is not a watertight zipper.

Semi-dry suits are effectively a wetsuit with improved seals at wrist, neck and ankles and also usually featuring a watertight zipper. Together, these features greatly reduce the amount of water moving through the suit as the wearer moves in the water. The wearer gets wet in a semi-dry suit but the water that enters is soon warmed up and is not "flushed" out by colder water entering from the outside environment, so the wearer remains warm longer. The trapped layer of water does not add significantly to the suit's insulating ability. Any residual water circulation past the seals still causes heat loss, but this loss is minimised due to the more effective seals. Though more expensive and more difficult to take on and off than a wetsuit (in most cases, a helper will be needed to close the dry-zip, which is usually located across the shoulders), semi-dry suits are cheaper and simpler than dry suits, and in the case of scuba diving, require no additional skills to use. They are usually made from thick neoprene (typically 6 mm or more), which provides good thermal protection at shallow depth, but lose buoyancy and thermal protection as the gas bubbles in the Neoprene compress at depth, like a normal wetsuit. Early suits marketed as "Semi-dry" suits came come in various configurations including a one-piece full-body suit or two pieces, made of 'long johns' and a separate 'jacket'. Almost all modern semi-dry suits are one piece suits, with the zipper usually being across the shoulders on the back, but other arrangements have been used. Semi-dry suits do not usually incorporate boots, and most models do not include a hood, (as creating a good seal around the face is difficult) so a separate pair of wetsuit boots, hood and gloves are worn, as needed. They are most suitable for use where the water temperature is between 10 and 20 °C (50 and 68 °F).

=== Heated suits ===
Electrically heated wetsuits are also available on the market. These suits have special heating panels integrated in the back of the wetsuit. The power for heating comes from batteries also integrated into the wetsuit. More versatile is the heated neoprene vest that works in the same way as the heated wetsuit but can be worn under any type of wetsuit.

Wetsuits heated by a flow of hot water piped from the surface are standard equipment for commercial diving in cold water, particularly where the heat loss from the diver is increased by use of helium based breathing gases. Hot water suits are a loose fit as there is a constant supply of heated water piped into the suit which must escape to allow even flow distribution. Flushing with cold water is prevented by the constant outflow of heating water.

== Accessories ==
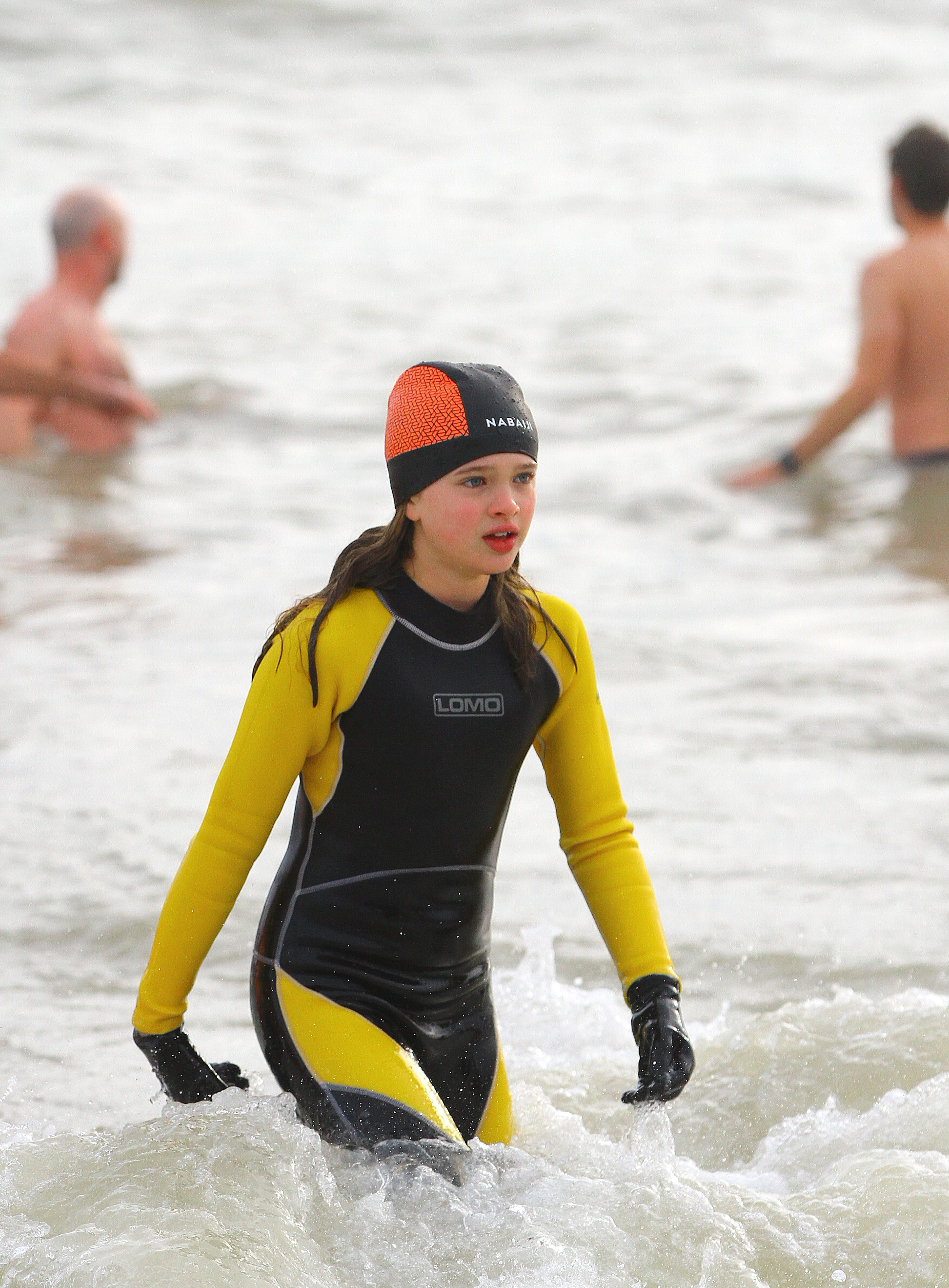
Swimmer wearing a full-length wetsuit and accessories

Usually a wetsuit has no covering for the feet, hands or head, and the diver must wear separate neoprene boots, gloves and hood for additional insulation and environmental protection. Other accessories to the basic suit include pockets for holding small items and equipment, and knee-pads, to protect the knee area from abrasion and tearing, usually used by working divers. Suits may have abrasion protection pads in other areas depending on the application.

=== Hoods ===
In the thermal balance of the human body, the heat loss from the head and neck is roughly proportional to the exposed surface area, though there may be less vasoconstriction than the more peripheral areas, which could push up the amount. When the rest of the body is insulated, the percentage can be considerably higher, so wearing a well-fitting hood is useful, even at fairly moderate water temperatures. Hoods have been reported to cause claustrophobia in a minority of users, sometimes due to poor fit. The hood should not fit too tightly round the neck. Flushing in the neck area can be reduced by using a hood attached to the top part of the suit, or by having sufficient overlap between the hood and the top part of the suit to constrain flow between the two parts. This can be achieved by tucking a circular flap at the base of the neck of the hood under the top of the suit before closing the zip, or by having a high neck on the suit. Wearing a hood can protect the ears, and reduce and delay the onset of surfer's ear.

=== Boots ===
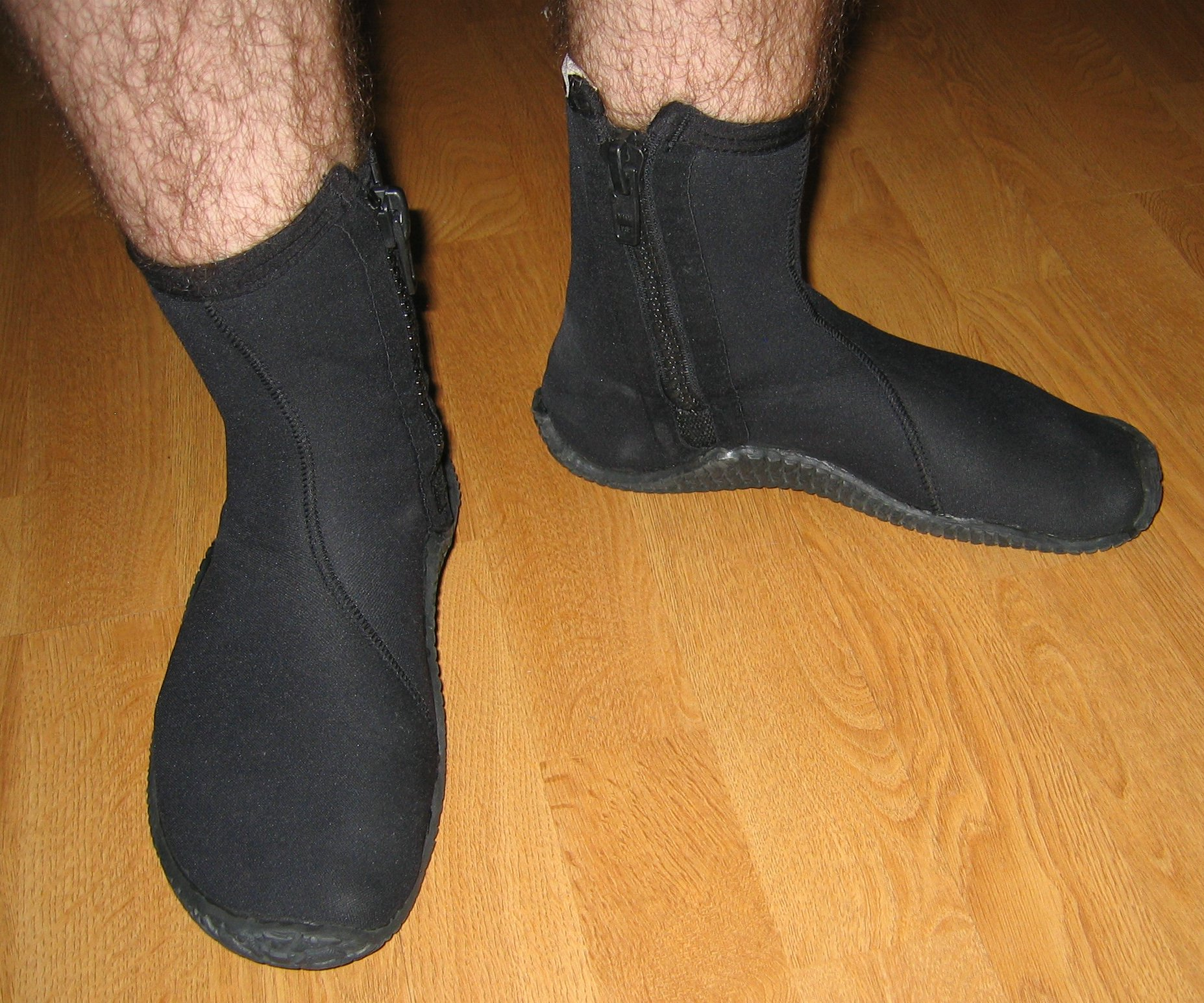
A pair of zippered wetsuit boots. Note the reinforced sole for protection.

Wetsuit boots (bootees) are worn for various purposes, and may be worn with or without a wetsuit.

==== Thermal protection ====
In many water sports such as scuba diving, surfing, kayaking, windsurfing, sailing and even fishing, bootees may be worn to keep the feet warm in the same way that a wetsuit would. Insulation is proportional to thickness and thus to how cold the water which the user can tolerate; it may be above or below the standard of 5–6 mm of neoprene. In warmer climates where the thermal qualities of the bootee are not so important, a bootee with a thickness of 2–3.5 mm is common. The leg of the bootee may have a zipper down one side or may be tightened with a velcro strap. Where boots are worn with a wetsuit they are usually tucked under the leg of the suit for streamlining, to help hold the zip closed, and to keep foreign objects out.

==== Foot protection ====
A bootee usually has a reinforced sole for walking. Typically, this is a solid rubber compound that is thicker and tougher than the neoprene used for the upper part of the bootee but is still flexible. The reinforced sole provides the wearer with some protection and grip when walking across shingle, coral and other rough surfaces.

===== For scuba diving =====
For scuba diving the sole of the bootee should not be so thick that the diver cannot get a fin on over it. Divers wearing bootees use fins with a foot pocket larger than needed with bare feet. Divers in warm water who do not wear a diving suit sometimes wear bootees so they can wear bigger fins. Diving bootees are typically intended for wear with open-heeled fins, held on by a strap, and usually do not fit into full-footed fins. Neoprene socks may be used with full-footed fins, either to prevent chafing and blisters, or for warmth.. Suit compression with depth also affects fin fit, as thicker neoprene compresses more with depth, and needs more stretch from the fin strap to compensate.

===== For surfing =====
For surfing, windsurfing, kitesurfing and similar sports, bootees are typically worn where the weather is so cold that the surfer would lose some degree of functionality in the feet. The bootee should not restrict the ability of a surfer to grip the board with the toes in the desired manner. Split-toe bootees allow for some improvement in this functionality. Reef walkers are small bootees that are only as high as the ankle and generally only 2 to 3.5mm thick. They are designed to allow surfers to get out to waves that break at coral reefs or at rocky beaches.

===== For kayaking =====
Several styles of wetsuit boots are commonly used for kayaking. Short-cut boots are frequently used in warmer conditions where the boots help give grip and foot protection while launching and portaging. In cold conditions longer wetsuit boots may be used with a drysuit where they are worn over the rubber drysuit socks.

=== Gloves ===
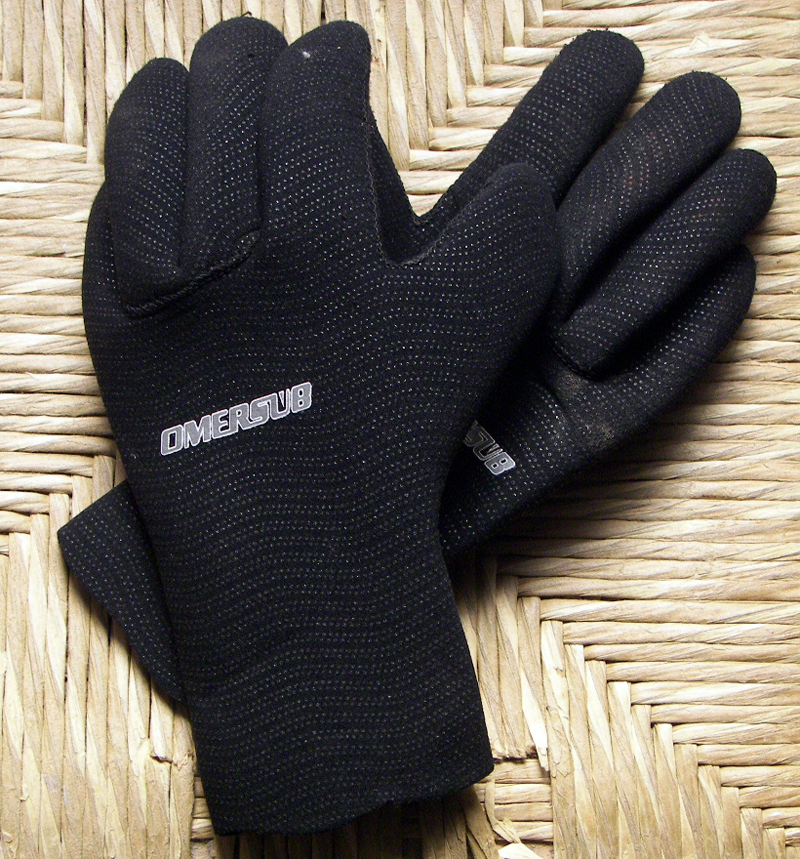
Neoprene wetsuit gloves

Wetsuit gloves are worn to keep the hands warm and to protect the skin while working. They are available in a range of thicknesses. Thicker gloves reduce manual dexterity and limit feel. Wetsuit gloves are also commonly worn with dry suits. Some divers cut the fingertips of the gloves off on the fingers most used for delicate work like operating the controls on a camera housing. If this is done, the fingertips are exposed to cold and possible injury, so thin work-gloves may be worn under the insulating gloves.

For cold water use, thicker mittens with a single space for the middle, ring and fifth fingers are available and can provide more warmth at the cost of reducing dexterity.

== See also ==
- Dry suit – Watertight clothing that seals the wearer from cold and hazardous liquids
- Human factors in diving equipment design – Influence of the interaction between the user and the equipment on design
- Rash guard – Stretch garment for protection from abrasion, UV and stings
- Thermal balance of the underwater diver – Conditions in which the temperature of a diver can remain stable
- Glossary of surfing
