= Water polo at the 1928 Summer Olympics – Men's team squads =

Water polo

Each country was allowed to enter a team of 11 players and they all were eligible for participation.

- CF=Centre forward
- CB=Centre back
- D=Defender
- GK=Goalkeeper

== Argentina ==
Argentina had only a squad of eight players entered.

Head coach:

No.	Pos.	Player	DoB	Age	Caps	Club	Tournament games	Tournament goals
		Mario Bistoletti			?		2	0
	GK	Ricardo Bustamante			?		2	0
		Carlos Castro			?		2	0
		Jorge Moreau	1908		?		2	0
		Luciano Rovere			?		2	0
		S. Stipanicic			?		2	0
		Francisco Uranga			?		2	0
		César Vásquez			?		2	0

== Belgium ==
Head coach:

No.	Pos.	Player	DoB	Age	Caps	Club	Tournament games	Tournament goals
		René Bauwens	11 March 1894	34	?		2	2
		Fernard Bettens			?		0	0
		Gérard Blitz	1 August 1901	27	?		2	0
	GK	Jules Brandeleer			?		2	0
		Pierre Coppieters	24 June 1907	21	?		2	6
		Henri De Pauw	26 February 1911	17	?		1	3
		Joseph Malissart			?		1	1
		André Mélardy			?		1	1
		J. J. Tensen			?		0	0
		Louis Van Gheem			?		2	1
		Frank Visser	27 June 1907	21	?		1	0

== Czechoslovakia ==
Head coach:

No.	Pos.	Player	DoB	Age	Caps	Club	Tournament games	Tournament goals
	GK	Josef Bušek	28 August 1901	26	?		1	0
		Kurt Epstein	21 January 1904	22	?		1	0
		František Getreuer			?		1	0
		Hugo Klempfner			?		0	0
		J. Kroc			?		0	0
		A. Novotny			?		0	0
		Michal Schmuck	9 January 1909	19	?		1	0
		František Schulz			?		1	1
		Pavol Steiner	29 March 1908	20	?		1	0
		Ladislav Švehla			?		1	0
		Josef Tomášek			?		0	0

== France ==
France had only a squad of nine players entered.

Head coach: Paul Beulque

No.	Pos.	Player	DoB	Age	Caps	Club	Tournament games	Tournament goals
		Émile Bulteel	3 August 1906	22	?	(France) EN Tourcoing	5	0
		Henri Cuvelier	1 June 1908	20	?	(France) EN Tourcoing	6	2
	GK	Paul Dujardin	10 May 1894	34	?	(France) EN Tourcoing	6	0
		Jules Keignaert	15 June 1907	21	?	(France) EN Tourcoing	3	0
		Henri Padou	15 May 1898	30	?	(France) EN Tourcoing	6	3
		Ernest Rogez	16 March 1908	20	?	(France) EN Tourcoing	1	0
		Albert Thévenon	16 September 1901	26	?	(France) Libellule	4	0
		Achille Tribouillet	25 December 1902	25	?	(France) EN Tourcoing	6	1
		Albert Vandeplancke	2 January 1911	27	?	(France) EN Tourcoing	5	0

== Germany ==
Head coach: Moritz Nußbaum

No.	Pos.	Player	DoB	Age	Caps	Club	Tournament games	Tournament goals
		Heinrich Atmer	21 October 1906	21	?	(Germany) Wasserfreunde 98 Hannover	0	0
		Max Amann	19 January 1905	23	?	(Germany) Hellas Magdeburg	3	3
		Karl Bähre	14 April 1899	29	?	(Germany) Wasserfreunde 98 Hannover	3	8
		Emil Benecke	4 October 1898	29	?	(Germany) Hellas Magdeburg	3	3
	GK	Johann Blank	17 April 1904	24	?	(Germany) Bayern 07 Nürnberg	1	0
		Otto Cordes	31 August 1905	22	?	(Germany) Hellas Magdeburg	3	1
		Fritz Gunst	22 September 1908	19	?	(Germany) Wasserfreunde 98 Hannover	3	1
		Otto Kühne	22 August 1896	31	?	(Germany) Wasserfreunde 98 Hannover	0	0
		Karl-Heinz Protze	5 April 1905	23	?	(Germany) Hellas Magdeburg	0	0
	GK	Erich Rademacher	9 June 1901	26	?	(Germany) Hellas Magdeburg	2	0
		Joachim Rademacher	20 June 1906	21	?	(Germany) Hellas Magdeburg	3	2

== Great Britain ==
Great Britain had only a squad of ten players entered.

Head coach:

No.	Pos.	Player	DoB	Age	Caps	Club	Tournament games	Tournament goals
	GK	Leslie Ablett	6 March 1904	24	?		3	0
		Nicholas Beaman	1897		?		4	3
		Jack Budd	1899		?	(United Kingdom) Penguin SC	4	3
		W. G. Freeguard			?		0	0
		Jack Hatfield	15 August 1893	34	?		2	1
		Richard Hodgson	24 December 1892	35	?		2	0
		Edward Peter	28 March 1902	26	?		4	1
		William Quick			?		1	0
		Paul Radmilovic	5 March 1886	42	?	(United Kingdom) Weston-super-Mare Water Polo Club	4	4
		Edward Temme	16 September 1904	23	?	(United Kingdom) Plaistow Swimming Club	4	0

== Hungary ==
Head coach:

No.	Pos.	Player	DoB	Age	Caps	Club	Tournament games	Tournament goals
	GK	István Barta	13 August 1895	32	?	(Hungary) III. Kerületi Vivó Egylet	4	0
		György Bródy	21 July 1908	20	?		0	0
		Oszkar Csorba			?		0	0
		László Czele			?		0	0
		Olivér Halassy	31 July 1909	19	?	(Hungary) Újpesti Torna Egylet	4	3
		Márton Homonnai	5 February 1906	22	?	(Hungary) Magyar Testgyakorlók Köre	4	2
		Sándor Ivády	1 May 1903	25	?	(Hungary) Magyar Atlétikai Club	4	0
		Alajos Keserű	8 March 1905	23	?	(Hungary) Ferencvárosi Torna Club	4	10
		Ferenc Keserű	27 August 1903	24	?	(Hungary) Magyar Testgyakorlók Köre	4	4
		József Vértesy	19 February 1901	27	?	(Hungary) Ferencvárosi Torna Club	4	7
		János Wenk	24 April 1894	32	?		0	0

== Ireland ==
Ireland had only a squad of nine players entered.

Head coach: A.J. Cullen (Clontarf S.C.)

No.	Pos.	Player	DoB	Age	Caps	Club	Tournament games	Tournament goals
	B	James S. Brady	1891		3	(Republic of Ireland) Clontarf Swimming Club	0	0
	FB	Hayes Dockrell	16 March 1907	21	5	(Republic of Ireland) Dublin University Swimming Club	1	0
	F	Henry Graham Ellerker	Oct 1900	27	0	(Republic of Ireland) Dublin University Swimming Club	0	0
	F	Charles Fagan	1899	29	5	(Republic of Ireland) Sandycove Swimming Club	1	0
	FB	Norman Judd	1904	24	4	(Republic of Ireland) Dublin Swimming Club	1	0
	F	Patrick McClure			3	(Republic of Ireland) Clonard Swimming Club, Belfast	1	1
	GK	Sammy Moore			?	(Republic of Ireland) East End Swimming Club, Belfast	1	0
	F	Joseph O'Connor	2 June 1904	24	3	(Republic of Ireland) Dublin Swimming Club	1	0
	HB	Michael A. O'Connor (capt)	27 February 1900	28	13	(Republic of Ireland) Dublin Swimming Club	1	0

== Luxembourg ==
Head coach:

No.	Pos.	Player	DoB	Age	Caps	Club	Tournament games	Tournament goals
		G. Arnoldy			?		0	0
	GK	Georges Bauer			?		1	0
		L. Hengen			?		0	0
		Victor Klees	4 December 1887	40	?		1	0
		J. P. Konsbrück			?		0	0
		Eugène Kuborn	14 November 1902	25	?		1	0
		Charles Mersch	17 January 1908	20	?		1	0
		Jules Staudt			?		1	1
		Norbert Staudt			?		1	0
		V. Thom			?		0	0
		Félix Unden			?		1	0

== Malta ==
Malta had only a squad of nine players entered.

Head coach:

No.	Pos.	Player	DoB	Age	Caps	Club	Tournament games	Tournament goals
		Harry Bonavia	4 January 1908	20	?	(Malta) Sliema United	1	1
		Carmelo Busietta			?	(Malta) Sliema United	2	0
		Victor Busietta			?	(Malta) Sliema United	2	0
		Louis Darmanin	19 November 1908	19	?	(Malta) Sliema United	2	0
		Edward Magri			?	(Malta) Sliema United	1	1
	GK	Francisco Nappa			?	(Malta) Valletta United	2	0
		Victor Pace	3 May 1907	21	?	(Malta) Sliema United	1	0
		Turu Rizzo	13 March 1894	34	?	(Malta) Sliema United	1	0
		Roger Vella	15 January 1905	23	?	(Malta) Sliema United	2	1

== Netherlands ==
Head coach:

No.	Pos.	Player	DoB	Age	Caps	Club	Tournament games	Tournament goals
		Koos Köhler	25 November 1905	22	?	(Netherlands) De Robben Hilversum	2	6
		Sjaak Köhler	2 October 1902	25	?	(Netherlands) Haagse Zwem- en Polo Club	2	1
		Frans Kuijper			?		0	0
		Cornelis Leenheer	5 June 1906	22	?	(Netherlands) 't IJ Amsterdam	2	4
		H. Minnes			?		0	0
	GK	Abraham van Olst	24 September 1897	30	?	(Netherlands) 't IJ Amsterdam	2	0
		G. B. Rijke			?		0	0
		Jan Scholte	5 January 1910	18	?	(Netherlands) HZC De Robben	2	1
		Han van Senus	10 October 1900	27	?	(Netherlands) 't IJ Amsterdam	2	1
		Pieter van Senus	8 December 1903	34	?	(Netherlands) Amsterdamsche Zwemclub 1870	0	0
		Jean van Silfhout	4 February 1902	26	?		2	1

== Spain ==
Spain had only a squad of eight players entered.

Head coach:

No.	Pos.	Player	DoB	Age	Caps	Club	Tournament games	Tournament goals
		Jaime Cruells	1906		?		1	0
		Luis Gibernau			?		0	0
	GK	Gonzalo Jiménez	30 June 1902	26	?		1	0
		Rafael Jiménez			?		1	0
		Manuel Majo			?		1	0
		José María Puig	1903		?		1	0
		Àngel Sabata	28 March 1911	17	?	(Spain) Club Natació Barcelona	1	0
		Mariano Trigo	31 August 1900	27	?		1	0

== Switzerland ==
Switzerland had only a squad of ten players entered.

Head coach:

No.	Pos.	Player	DoB	Age	Caps	Club	Tournament games	Tournament goals
		Armand Boppart			?		0	0
		Eric Brochon			?		1	0
		Robert Hürlimann			?		1	0
		Ernest Hüttenmoser			?		1	1
		Robert Mermoud	25 September 1908	19	?		1	0
		Fernand Moret	1905		?		1	0
		Edouard Ruchti			?		0	0
	GK	Othmar Schmalz			?		1	0
		Eugen Tschümperly			?		0	0
		Robert Wyss	17 January 1901	27	?	(Switzerland) Old Boys Basel	1	0

== United States ==
Head coach:

No.	Pos.	Player	DoB	Age	Caps	Club	Tournament games	Tournament goals
		John Cattus			?		0	0
	GK	Harry Daniels	24 June 1900	28	?	(United States) Chicago Athletic Association	2	0
		Joseph Farley			?		0	0
		Richard Greenberg	13 June 1902	26	?	(United States) Chicago Athletic Association	1	0
		Sam Greller	18 May 1907	21	?	(United States) Illinois Athletic Club	2	0
		George Mitchell	23 April 1901	27	?	(United States) Olympic Club San Francisco	2	0
		Wally O'Connor	25 April 1905	22	?	(United States) Los Angeles Athletic Club	1	1
		Paul Samson	12 June 1905	23	?	(United States) Illinois Athletic Club	1	0
		George Schroth	31 December 1899	28	?	(United States) Olympic Club San Francisco	2	0
		Herbert Topp	20 April 1900	28	?	(United States) Chicago Athletic Association	2	0
		Johnny Weissmuller	2 June 1904	24	?	(United States) Illinois Athletic Club	1	0
