= Deaths in February 1987 =

The following is a list of notable deaths in February 1987.

Entries for each day are listed alphabetically by surname. A typical entry lists information in the following sequence:

- Name, age, country of citizenship at birth, subsequent country of citizenship (if applicable), reason for notability, cause of death (if known), and reference.

== February 1987 ==
=== 1 ===
- Alessandro Blasetti, 86, Italian film director and screenwriter, complications from fall.
- Christian Broda, 70, Austrian lawyer and politician, Minister of Justice, heart attack.
- Sala Burton, 61, Polish-born American politician, member of U.S. House of Representatives (1983–1987), colon cancer.
- Salvadora Debayle, 91, First Lady of Nicaragua.
- Gustav Knuth, 85, German film actor.
- Jack Monohan Jr., 84, Australian rules footballer.
- Lee Aubrey "Speed" Riggs, 79, American tobacco auctioneer, voice of Lucky Strike cigarettes, heart failure.

=== 2 ===
- Merle Alexander, 79, American basketball player.
- Carlos José Castilho, 59, Brazilian international footballer (Fluminense, Brazil), suicide.
- Walter Clutterbuck, 92, English general in the British Army.
- Yakov Estrin, 63, Soviet chess player, ICCF World Champion.
- Spike Hughes, 78, British musician and composer.
- Néstor Lambertus, 80, Dominican baseball player.
- Alfred Lion, 78, German-born American record executive, co-founded Blue Note Records, heart failure.
- Olive Little, 69, American baseball player in the All-American Girls Professional Baseball League.
- Alistair MacLean, 64, Scottish novelist of thrillers and adventure stories (The Guns of Navarone), heart failure.
- David du Plessis, 81, South African-born American Pentecostal minister.
- Ken Reid, 67, British comic artist and writer, co-creator of Roger the Dodger, stroke.

=== 3 ===
- Donald Aronow, 59, American speedboat designer, builder and racer, murdered.
- Mustafa Bouyali, 46–47, leader of the Algerian Islamic Armed Movement, killed in an ambush.
- Theodore Cogswell, 68, American science fiction author.
- Nobuhito, Prince Takamatsu, 82, younger brother of Japanese Emperor Hirohito, lung cancer.
- George Derwent Thomson, 83–84, British classical scholar and Marxist philosopher.

=== 4 ===
- Georges Bauer, 82, Luxembourgish Olympic water polo player (1928).
- Gunnar Böös, 92, Swedish Olympic fencer (1912).
- Paul Dresse, 85, Belgian writer.
- Bruce Jacobi, 51, American race car driver, racing accident.
- Meena Keshwar Kamal, 30, Afghani revolutionary political and women's rights activist, assassinated.
- Liberace, 67, American pianist, singer and actor, pneumonia.
- Fyfe Robertson, 84, Scottish television journalist and broadcaster.
- Carl Rogers, 85, American psychologist, heart attack after fall.
- Wynford Vaughan-Thomas, 78, Welsh newspaper journalist, radio and television broadcaster.
- Patrick Waddington, 85, English actor.
- George W. Woodruff, 91, American engineer and businessman, pneumonia.

=== 5 ===
- E. Michael Burke, 70, American navy officer, circus manager and Major League Baseball executive, cancer.
- William Collier Jr., 84, American stage performer, producer and film actor.
- Klāvs Elsbergs, 28, Latvian poet and translator, fall from building.
- David Ensor, 80, British actor and politician, Member of Parliament.
- Armando Fosco, 64, American leader of the International Brotherhood of Teamsters.
- Gustav Lechner, 73, Austro-Hungarian–born Yugoslav international footballer (Beograd, Yugoslavia).
- Otto Wöhler, 92, Nazi German general, convicted of war crimes and crimes against humanity.

=== 6 ===
- Lalithambika Antharjanam, 77, Indian author.
- Julien Chouinard, 58, Canadian lawyer and Puisne Justice of the Supreme Court of Canada, brain cancer.
- Ira Hall, 95, American racing driver.
- Donald MacCrimmon MacKay, 64, British physicist and professor.
- K. C. Nag, 93, Indian Bengali mathematician and author of mathematics textbooks.

=== 7 ===
- Charles R. Barber, 85, American politician.
- Vara Martin Daniel, 69, American educator and First Lady of Guam (1961–1963).
- George Fritts, 67, American NFL player (Philadelphia Eagles).
- Cyril Horn, 82, English Olympic speed skater (1924, 1928).
- Tom Lavery, 75, South African Olympic athlete (1936).
- John Leypoldt, 40, American NFL footballer (Buffalo Bills), dysentery.
- Bennetto Payne, 77, Mexican professional boxer.
- Ralph Ricker, 79, American football coach.
- Stuart T. Saunders, 77, American railroad executive, heart failure.
- Claudio Villa, 61, Italian singer and actor, heart attack.
- Adriaan van Wijngaarden, 70, Dutch mathematician and computer scientist.

=== 8 ===
- Tony Destra, 32, American drummer, traffic collision.
- Larnie Jordan, 72, American baseball player.
- Hendrik Koekoek, 74, Dutch farmer, politician and founder of the defunct Farmers' Party.
- Elsie Lee, 75, American author of fiction and non-fiction.
- Harriet MacGibbon, 81, American actress (The Beverly Hillbillies).
- Bob Masters, 74, American NFL player.
- Max Seydewitz, 94, German politician, Minister-President of Saxony.
- Bronisława Wajs, 78, Polish-Romani classic poet and singer.

=== 9 ===
- Elio Bavutti, 72, Italian Olympic cyclist (1936).
- Larry French, 79, American Major League baseball player (Chicago Cubs, Pittsburgh Pirates), kidney and heart disease.
- Louis Plack Hammett, 92, American physical chemist (Hammett equation).
- Edna Manley, 86, Jamaican artist.
- Leo Turksma, 81, Dutch Olympic boxer (1924).

=== 10 ===
- Angela Giussani, 64, Italian co-writer of comic book anti-hero series, Diabolik.
- Winifred Kastner, 83, British-born Australian radio broadcaster, community leader and welfare worker.
- Robert O'Brien, 78, American racing driver.
- William Rose, 68, American screenwriter (Guess Who's Coming to Dinner).
- Hans Rosenthal, 61, German director and radio & television host.
- Sadequain, 56, Pakistani artist and poet.
- John Raymond Ylitalo, 70, American diplomat, U.S. Ambassador to Paraguay, cancer.

=== 11 ===
- Mark Ashton, 26, British gay rights activist, pneumonia.
- Francesco Gabriotti, 72, Italian Olympic footballer (1936).
- Edith Gyömrői Ludowyk, 90, Hungarian-born psychotherapist, poet and communist militant.
- Andy Linden, 64, American race car driver.
- John Malachi, 67, American jazz pianist.
- Bill McGee, 77, American Major League baseball player (St. Louis Cardinals).
- John Moore, 53–54, American college basketball player (UCLA Bruins).

=== 12 ===
- Jules Bergman, 57, American broadcast writer and journalist, science editor for ABC News.
- Lang Jeffries, 56, Canadian-American television and film actor, cancer.
- Shozo Makino, 71, Japanese Olympic swimmer (1932, 1936).
- Brian Maunsell, 51, New Zealand Olympic field hockey player (1964).
- Valentin Olenik, 47, Soviet Russian Olympic wrestler (1964, 1968).
- Dennis Poore, 70, British entrepreneur, financier and racing driver.
- Howard Steel, 75, Australian rules footballer.

=== 13 ===
- Heidi Becker-Ramlow, 32, German Olympic diver (1972, 1976).
- M. Bhaktavatsalam, 89, Indian independence activist and politician, Chief Minister of Madras State.
- Clifford Bias, 76, American alleged psychic.
- Dorothy Dean, 54, American writer and actress, cancer.
- Dhumal, 72, Indian actor in Bollywood films, heart attack.
- Arne Grunander, 69, Swedish ice hockey executive.
- Curly Page, 84, New Zealand Test cricketer and international rugby union player.

=== 14 ===
- Rolf Dahlgren, 54, Swedish-Danish botanist and professor, traffic collision.
- Kulada Charan Das Gupta, 87, Indian judge of the Supreme Court of India.
- Stanley Ellis, 91, English cricketer.
- Wendy Holcombe, 23, American banjo player and singer, congenital heart defect.
- Dmitry Kabalevsky, 82, Soviet composer, conductor and pianist.
- Karolos Koun, 78, Greek theatre director, heart attack.
- Tsai Lan-chin, 22, Taiwanese singer and songwriter, heart attack.
- Mansfield Rangi, 51, New Zealand cricket umpire.
- Bola Sete, 63, Brazilian jazz guitarist, pneumonia and lung cancer.
- Einar Wøhni, 66, Norwegian politician.

=== 15 ===
- Jimmy Holiday, 52, American R&B singer and songwriter, heart failure.
- Osmo Lindeman, 57, Finnish composer.
- John Myhill, 63, British mathematician (Myhill–Nerode theorem).
- Gus J. Solomon, 80, American district judge.

=== 16 ===
- Norman Crowther Hunt, 66, British scholar and politician, Minister of State, heart attack.

=== 17 ===
- Leo Anchóriz, 54, Spanish actor and writer, cardiac disease.
- T. M. Chummar, 87, Indian academic and writer of Malayalam literature.
- Hal K. Dawson, 90, American actor.
- Jaakko Friman, 83, Finnish Olympic speed skater (1928).
- Alejandro Hannig, 89, Chilean Olympic sprinter (1928).
- Ray Hayes, 51, American NFL player (Minnesota Vikings).
- Hubert Howard, 79, English intelligence officer.
- Frank Kurtis, 79, American racing car designer, heart attack.
- Diederick Charles Mathew, 58, Aruban politician and teacher, deputy commissioner for Aruba.
- Colin McVicar, 70, New Zealand cricketer.
- Husayn Muruwwa, appr. 77, Lebanese Marxist philosopher, journalist and author, assassinated.
- Milivoj Radović, 71, Yugoslav Olympic fencer (1936).
- Romola Remus, 86, American actress (The Fairylogue and Radio-Plays).
- Verree Teasdale, 83, American actress.
- Hans Tetzner, 88, Dutch Olympic footballer (1924).
- Jacques Toupin, 76, Canadian NHL player (Chicago Blackhawks).

=== 18 ===
- William Coldstream, 78, English realist painter and art teacher.
- Bryce Harlow, 70, American army officer and advisor to U.S. presidents, lung disease.
- Boris Kowerda, 79, Soviet monarchist, diplomat and convicted murderer.
- Silvio Pietroboni, 82, Italian footballer and Olympian (1928).
- Vladimir Vyshpolsky, 71, Soviet Olympic fencer (1952).

=== 19 ===
- John Blackburn, 62, English cricketer.
- Monk Gafford, 66, American football player.
- Hugh Greene, 76, British television executive and journalist, Director-General of the BBC, cancer.
- Cecil Hadgraft, 82, Australian academic and literacy critic.
- Henry-Russell Hitchcock, 83, American architectural historian and professor, cancer.
- Robert E. Kuttner, 59, American biologist and white supremacist.
- Kirsten Walther, 53, Danish actress, heart failure.

=== 20 ===
- Wayne Boring, 81, American comic book artist, known for his work on Superman, heart attack.
- Donald Burns, 65, New Zealand cricket umpire.
- Caesar Gatimu, 65, Kenyan Roman Catholic Bishop of Nyeri.
- Edgar P. Jacobs, 82, Belgian comic book creator (Blake and Mortimer).
- Henry Krause, 73, American NFL player.
- Harry Lawrence, 78, American football coach.
- Joseph Parecattil, 74, Indian Roman Catholic prelate, Archbishop of Ernakulam.
- Lev Russov, 61, Soviet painter, graphic artist and sculptor, heart disease.
- AKM Samsuzzoha, appr. 62, Bangladeshi politician, member of parliament.
- C. C. Wei, 72, Chinese-born American contract bridge player, complications from diabetes.
- Willi Welscher, 80, German hurdler and Olympian (1932, 1936).

=== 21 ===
- William T. Fairbourn, 72, American general in the U.S. Marine Corps.
- Petro Grigorenko, 79, Ukrainian-born general in the Soviet Army, founder of human rights movement in the Soviet Union.
- Helen Taft Manning, 95, American professor of history, daughter of President William Taft, pneumonia.
- Noel Odell, 96, English geologist and mountaineer.
- George Tibbles, 73, American composer and screenwriter.
- Meir Ya'ari, 89, Israeli politician, educator and social activist.

=== 22 ===
- Marius Berthet, 83, French Olympic rower (1928).
- Naomi Drake, 80, American Registrar of the Bureau of Vital Statistics for New Orleans.
- Habib Painter, 72, Indian Qawwal and folk singer.
- John Paul Scott, 60, American criminal, only escapee from Alcatraz to reach San Francisco shore.
- David Susskind, 66, American producer and TV talk show host, heart attack.
- Andy Warhol, 58, American artist, director and writer, sudden post-operative irregular heartbeat.
- Glenway Wescott, 85, American poet and novelist, stroke.

=== 23 ===
- José Afonso, 57, Portuguese singer-songwriter and activist, heart failure.
- Robert Braet, 75, Belgian footballer.
- Cyril Butcher, 77, English actor and director.
- John Counsell, 81, English actor, director and theatre manager.
- William Droegemueller, 80, American Olympic athlete (1928).
- Jack Heinz, 78, American business executive and CEO of Heinz, cancer.
- Esmond Knight, 80, English actor, heart attack.
- Edward Lansdale, 79, American general in the U.S. Air Force, heart ailment.
- George Musulin, 72, American army officer of the OSS, CIA operative, diabetes.
- Polly Ward, 74, British singer and actress.

=== 24 ===
- Kakai Kilonzo, 32–33, Kenyan musician, malaria.
- Arthur Luck, 71, English cricketer.
- Edwin McArthur, 79, American classical music conductor and pianist.

=== 25 ===
- William G. Barr, 67, American politician, member of the Illinois House of Representatives (1967–1971).
- Hotse Bartlema, 75, Dutch Olympic rower (1936).
- S. H. Bihari, 66, Indian songwriter and poet.
- James Coco, 56, American actor (Man of La Mancha, Murder by Death), heart attack.
- John Collin, 58, British actor (Z-Cars).
- Arthur A. Collins, 77, American radio engineer and entrepreneur.
- Emilio Guruceta, 45, Spanish football referee.
- Jess Larson, 82, American lawyer, first Administrator of General Services.
- E. D. Nixon, 87, American civil rights leader and union organizer, respiratory and heart ailments.
- Krishna Chandra Panigrahi, 77, Indian historian and archaeologist.

=== 26 ===
- Agnes Dobson, 82, Australian actress.
- Harold Earthman, 86, American politician, member of the United States House of Representatives (1945–1947).
- Leif Efskind, 82, Norwegian surgeon.
- Knut Frydenlund, 59, Norwegian diplomat and politician, Minister of Foreign Affairs, cerebral hemorrhage.
- Audrey Marie Hilley, 53, American murderer and suspected serial killer, hypothermia and exposure.
- Eddie Jefferson, 64, American baseball player.
- Fredric R. Mann, 83, American industrialist and patron of the arts, U.S. Ambassador to Barbados, cancer.
- Paul Taunton Matthews, 67, British theoretical physicist, cycling accident.

=== 27 ===
- Franciszek Blachnicki, 65, Polish priest, poisoning.
- Jose W. Diokno, 65, Filipino nationalist, lawyer and statesman, Senator of the Philippines, cancer.
- Bill Holman, 83, American cartoonist (Smokey Stover).
- Fumio Kamei, 78, Japanese documentary and fiction film director.
- Salvatore Oppes, 77, Italian Olympic equestrian (1952, 1956).
- Reto Perl, 63, Swiss Olympic ice hockey player (1948).
- Latif-ur Rehman, 58, Indian and Pakistani hockey player and Olympic gold medalist.
- Colvin R. de Silva, 81–82, Sri Lankan politician, Minister of Plantation Industries.

=== 28 ===
- Nasim Amrohvi, 78, Pakistani Urdu poet and philosopher.
- Frederic G. Donner, 84, American chairman and CEO of the General Motors Corporation.
- Roy Foulds, 80, English rugby union player.
- Joan Greenwood, 65, English actress (Kind Hearts and Coronets), bronchitis and asthma.
- Kees Jonker, 77, Dutch Olympic sailor (1936, 1948).
- Nora Kaye, 67, American ballerina, cancer.
- William F. McKee, 80, American general in the U.S. Air Force, administrator of the Federal Aviation Administration.
- Anny Ondra, 83, Czech film actress (Blackmail).
- Edmond Pagès, 75, French road bicycle racer.
- Stephen Tennant, 80, British socialite.

=== Unknown date ===
- Raquel Martínez, 78, Chilean sprinter and Olympian.
- Adi Pherozeshah Marzban, 72, Indian Gujarati Parsi playwright, actor and director, lung cancer.
- Clare Rendlesham, 67, British fashion editor and boutique manager. (died by February 4)
