= Edoardo Magri =

Maltese water polo player

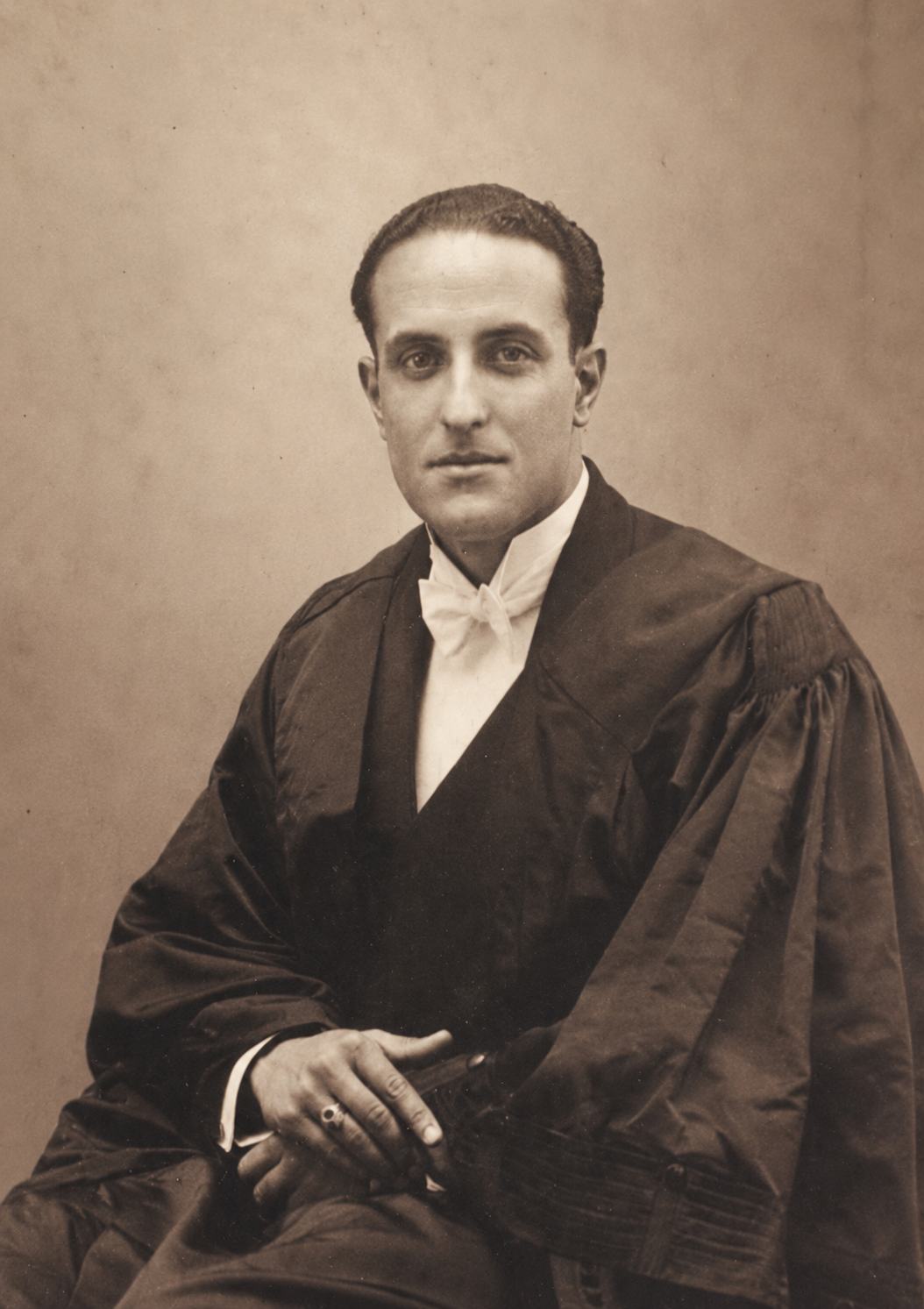
- Edoardo Magri in 1934

Judiciary of Malta
- In office 1963–1973

Personal details
- Born: 22 September 1908 Sliema, British Malta
- Died: 14 October 1998 (aged 90)
- Resting place: Addolorata Cemetery, Paola
- Citizenship: Maltese
- Spouse: Gladys (née Muscat)
- Children: 5
- Education: University of Malta
- Occupation: Judge, Olympian, Author

Edoardo (sive Edward) Magri (22 September 1908 – 14 October 1998) was a Maltese judge, author, and water polo player. He competed in the men's tournament at the 1928 Summer Olympics. On 14 July 1938, he married Gladys Muscat, and they had five children together: four sons, Antonio, Alessandro, Alberto (himself a judge), and Renato, and one daughter, Mariella.

== Legal career ==
Magri earned his Doctor of Laws (LLD) from the Royal University of Malta (later the University of Malta) in 1934, where he also served as president of the Comitato Permanente Universitario (Later University Students' Council (Malta)) for three years (1930-1933). Following his graduation, he entered private legal practice in a partnership with his older brother, Alberto Magri, who would also later become a judge. Magri maintained a continuous practice at the Bar from 1934 until his appointment as a judge in 1963, a position he held until retiring in 1973.

Magri's service to the legal community was extensive. He contributed to the Chamber of Advocates as editor of its Rostrum review (1957-1962) and as secretary (1961-1963). The standards set and the functions served by 'Rostrum' are a tribute to Edoardo Magri and a small team of individuals. On an international level, he served on the organising committee for the 1965 Congresso Internazionale di Studi Giuridici in Malta.

== Sports career ==
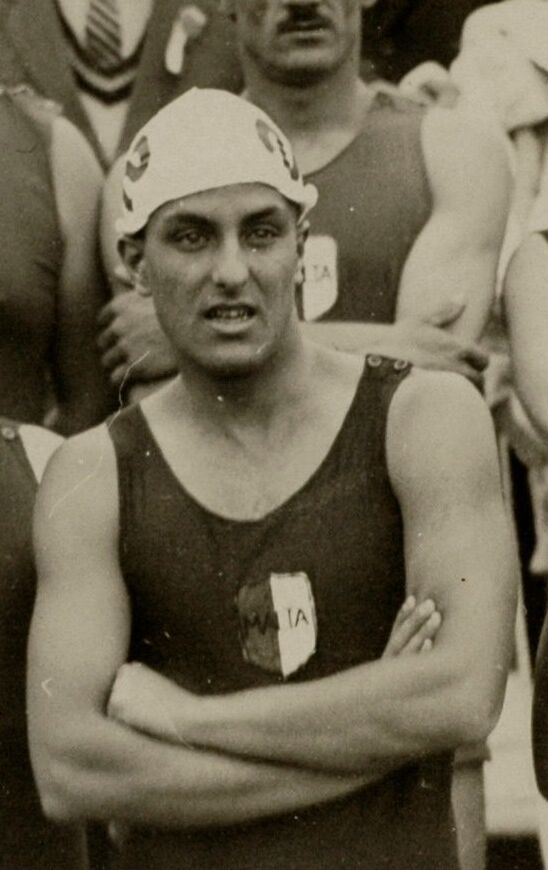
Edoardo Magri representing Malta at the 1928 Summer Olympics.

Magri participated in Malta's Olympic debut in Water polo at the 1928 Summer Olympics in Amsterdam (these were his only Olympic Games). During this tournament, he played in two matches.

The water polo tournament featured 14 teams competing in a single-elimination format. In the first round he played against the national team of Luxembourg (Malta's first game at the Olympics). The Maltese team won the match 3-1 and Magri was one of the goal scorers. The next two matches were lost by the Maltese team and they did not win any Olympic medals (0–16 against France and 0–10 against the United States respectively; Magri did not play in the match against France). This placed Malta at fifth place from a starting field of 14 teams.

Magri's club affiliation was with his hometown team Sliema United that was later (1930) renamed Sliema A.S.C. Sliema Aquatic Sports Club, it is the most successful water polo club on the island. As Sliema United, the club won its first Division 1 League in 1925 and again in 1929.

Magri was one of nine players who represented Malta in Amsterdam that year, alongside Harry Bonavia, Meme Busietta, Victor Busietta, Louis Darmanin, Francisco Nappa, Victor Pace, Turu Rizzo, and Roger Vella.

== Writing career ==
Magri was a Maltese author who published in both Maltese and Italian between 1936 and 1960, contributing to various fields including culture, sociology, law, and history. Due to limited media coverage during his active years and minimal promotion beyond professional networks, his publications remained somewhat obscure, with most surviving copies now held in private collections and university libraries.

Magri collaborated with Anthony Montanaro Gauci, another prominent Maltese judge, especially in the fields of law and cultural studies.

Most of Magri's publications, including drafts and lesser-known manuscripts, are preserved at the University of Malta Library, with many of them remaining uncatalogued and inaccessible to the public. This archival status has contributed to the relatively low visibility of his contributions in contemporary scholarship.

== Death and legacy ==
Magri died on 14 October 1998, at the age of 90, just a few months after the passing of his wife Gladys, on 31 May 1998.

Magri left a multifaceted legacy as one of Malta's most versatile public figures, achieving prominence across sport, law, and literature. As a water-polo player competing in the 1928 Summer Olympics in Amsterdam, together with his team mates, he holds the historic distinction of being among the first Maltese sports persons to actively participate in the Olympic Games. Professionally, his career spanned several decades, culminating in his decade-long service as a judge in the Judiciary of Malta. Beyond his institutional roles, Magri contributed heavily to the mid-century Maltese intellectual landscape through his published works on local sociology, law, culture, and history.
