= Busietta =

Busietta is a surname. Notable people with the surname include:

- Carmelo Busietta, Maltese water polo player
- Victor Busietta, Maltese water polo player
