= Norman Judd =

Norman Judd may refer to:

- Norman B. Judd (1815–1878), U.S. representative from Illinois
- Norman Judd (water polo) (1904–1980), Irish water polo player
