= Stanley Ellis (cricketer) =

English cricketer (1896–1987)

Personal information
- Full name: Stanley Ellis
- Born: 12 February 1896; Ramsbottom, Lancashire, England
- Died: 14 February 1987 (aged 91); Wilpshire, Lancashire, England
- Batting: Left-handed
- Bowling: Right-arm off break
- Role: Occasional wicket-keeper
- Relatives: Jeremy Ellis (father); Walker Ellis (brother)

Domestic team information
- Years: Team
- 1929–1937: Durham
- 1923–1924: Lancashire

Career statistics
Competition	First-class
Matches	8
Runs scored	57
Batting average	9.50
100s/50s	–/–
Top score	25
Balls bowled	683
Wickets	14
Bowling average	20.42
5 wickets in innings	1
10 wickets in match	–
Best bowling	5/21
Catches/stumpings	–/–
- Source: Cricinfo, 7 September 2011

Stanley Ellis (12 February 1896 – 14 February 1987) was an English cricketer. Ellis was a right-handed batsman who bowled right-arm off break and occasionally fielded as a wicket-keeper. He was born in Ramsbottom, Lancashire.

Ellis made his first-class debut for Lancashire against Derbyshire in the 1923 County Championship. He went on to make seven appearances for the county, the last of which came against Warwickshire in the 1924 County Championship. In his eight first-class matches, he scored 57 runs at an average of 9.50, with a high score of 25. With the ball, he took 14 wickets at a bowling average of 20.42, with his best figures of 5/21. These figures, which were his only first-class five-wicket haul, came against Gloucestershire in 1923. He left Lancashire at the end of the 1925 season. Ellis joined Durham in 1929, making his debut for the county in the Minor Counties Championship against the Lancashire's Second XI. He played Minor counties cricket for Durham from 1929 to 1937, making 68 appearances and taking 294 wickets for the county.

His brother Walker and his father Jeremy both played first-class cricket for Lancashire. Ellis died at Wilpshire, Lancashire, on 14 February 1987. At the time of his death, he was the oldest surviving Lancashire player.
