= Germany men's Olympic water polo team records and statistics =

This article lists various water polo records and statistics in relation to the Germany men's national water polo team, the United Team of Germany men's national water polo team, and the West Germany men's national water polo team at the Summer Olympics.

The Germany men's national water polo team, the United Team of Germany men's national water polo team, and the West Germany men's national water polo team have participated in 17 of 27 official men's water polo tournaments.

== Abbreviations ==
Apps	Appearances	Rk	Rank	Ref	Reference	Cap No.	Water polo cap number
Pos	Playing position	FP	Field player	GK	Goalkeeper	ISHOF	International Swimming Hall of Fame
L/R	Handedness	L	Left-handed	R	Right-handed	Oly debut	Olympic debut in water polo
(C)	Captain	p.	page	pp.	pages		

== Team statistics ==
=== Comprehensive results by tournament ===
Notes:

- Results of Olympic qualification tournaments are not included. Numbers refer to the final placing of each team at the respective Games.
- At the 1904 Summer Olympics, a water polo tournament was contested, but only American contestants participated. Currently the International Olympic Committee (IOC) and the International Swimming Federation (FINA) consider water polo event as part of unofficial program in 1904.
- Related teams: United Team of Germany men's Olympic water polo team^{†}, East Germany men's Olympic water polo team^{†}, West Germany men's Olympic water polo team^{†}.
- Last updated: 5 May 2021.

Legend

- 1 – Champions
- 2 – Runners-up
- 3 – Third place
- 4 – Fourth place
- — – The nation did not participate in the Games
- Q – Qualified for forthcoming tournament
- – Hosts
- = – More than one team tied for that rank
- Team^{†} – Defunct team

Abbreviation

- EUA – United Team of Germany
- FRG – West Germany
- GDR – East Germany

Men's team	00	04	08	12	20	24	28	32	36	48	52	56	60	64	68	72	76	80	84	88	92	96	00	04	08	12	16	20	Years
Germany	=5				—	—	1	2	2	—	15	See EUA			See FRG and GDR						7	9		5	10				9
United Team of Germany^{†}	See Germany											6	6	6	See FRG and GDR						See Germany								3
East Germany^{†}	Part of Germany											P. of EUA			6				—		Part of Germany								1
West Germany^{†}	Part of Germany											P. of EUA			10	4	6	—	3	4	Part of Germany								5
Total teams	7		4	6	12	13	14	5	16	18	21	10	16	13	15	16	12	12	12	12	12	12	12	12	12	12	12	12	

=== Number of appearances ===
Last updated: 5 May 2021.

Legend

- Year^{*} – As host team
- Team^{†} – Defunct team

Men's team	Apps	Record streak	Active streak	Debut	Most recent	Best finish	Confederation
Germany	9	3	0	1900	2008	Champions	Europe – LEN
West Germany^{†}	5	3	0	1968	1988	Third place	Europe – LEN
United Team of Germany^{†}	3	3	0	1956	1964	Sixth place	Europe – LEN

=== Best finishes ===
Last updated: 5 May 2021.

Legend

- Year^{*} – As host team
- Team^{†} – Defunct team

Men's team	Best finish	Apps	Confederation
Germany	Champions (1928)	9	Europe – LEN
West Germany^{†}	Third place (1984)	5	Europe – LEN
United Team of Germany^{†}	Sixth place (1956, 1960, 1964)	3	Europe – LEN

=== Finishes in the top four ===
Last updated: 5 May 2021.

Legend

- Year^{*} – As host team
- Team^{†} – Defunct team

Men's team	Total	Champions	Runners-up	Third place	Fourth place	First	Last
Germany	3	1 (1928)	2 (1932, 1936^{*})			1928	1936
West Germany^{†}	3			1 (1984)	2 (1972^{*}, 1988)	1972	1988
United Team of Germany^{†}	0					—	—

=== Medal table ===
Last updated: 5 May 2021.

Legend

- Team^{†} – Defunct team

Men's team	Gold	Silver	Bronze	Total
Germany (GER)	1	2	0	3
West Germany (FRG)^{†}	0	0	1	1
United Team of Germany^{†}	0	0	0	0
Totals (3 entries)	1	2	1	4

== Player statistics ==
=== Multiple appearances ===
The following table is pre-sorted by number of Olympic appearances (in descending order), year of the last Olympic appearance (in ascending order), year of the first Olympic appearance (in ascending order), date of birth (in ascending order), name of the player (in ascending order), respectively.

- Number of five-time Olympians: 0
- Number of four-time Olympians: 2
- Last updated: 5 May 2021.

Abbreviation

- FRG – West Germany
- GER – Germany
- MEX – Mexico

Male athletes who competed in water polo at four or more Olympics
Apps	Player	Birth	Pos	Water polo tournaments					Age of first/last	ISHOF member	Note	Ref
Apps	Player	Birth	Pos	1	2	3	4	5	Age of first/last	ISHOF member	Note	Ref
4	Armando Fernández	1955	FP	1972; MEX	1976; MEX		1984; FRG	1988; FRG	17/33			
4	Peter Röhle	1957	GK	1976; FRG		1984; FRG	1988; FRG	1992; GER	19/35			

=== Multiple medalists ===
The following table is pre-sorted by total number of Olympic medals (in descending order), number of Olympic gold medals (in descending order), number of Olympic silver medals (in descending order), year of receiving the last Olympic medal (in ascending order), year of receiving the first Olympic medal (in ascending order), name of the player (in ascending order), respectively.

- Number of four-time Olympic medalists: 0
- Number of three-time Olympic medalists: 1
- Last updated: 1 May 2021.

Legend

- – Hosts

Male athletes who won three or more Olympic medals in water polo
Rk	Player	Birth	Height	Pos	Water polo tournaments					Period (age of first/last)	Medals				Ref
Rk	Player	Birth	Height	Pos	1	2	3	4	5	Period (age of first/last)	G	S	B	T	Ref
1	Fritz Gunst	1908		FP	1928	1932	1936			8 years (19/27)	1	2	0	3	

=== Top goalscorers ===
The following table is pre-sorted by number of total goals (in descending order), year of the last Olympic appearance (in ascending order), year of the first Olympic appearance (in ascending order), name of the player (in ascending order), respectively.

- Number of goalscorers (50+ goals): 0
- Number of goalscorers (40–49 goals): 1
- Number of goalscorers (30–39 goals): 2
- Last updated: 5 May 2021.

Abbreviation

- FRG – West Germany
- GER – Germany
- MEX – Mexico

Male players with 30 or more goals at the Olympics
Rk	Player	Birth	L/R	Total goals	Water polo tournaments (goals)					Age of first/last	ISHOF member	Note	Ref
Rk	Player	Birth	L/R	Total goals	1	2	3	4	5	Age of first/last	ISHOF member	Note	Ref
1	Hagen Stamm	1960	Right	45	1984; FRG (18)	1988; FRG (15)	1992; GER (12)			24/32			
2	Frank Otto	1959	Left	38	1984; FRG (18)	1988; FRG (16)	1992; GER (4)			25/33			
3	Armando Fernández	1955		37	1972; MEX (11)	1976; MEX (16)		1984; FRG (6)	1988; FRG (4)	17/33			

Sources:

- Official Reports (PDF): 1900, 1928–1936, 1952–1976, 1984–1996;
- Official Results Books (PDF): 2004 (pp. 199–200), 2008 (pp. 196–197).

=== Goalkeepers ===
The following table is pre-sorted by edition of the Olympics (in ascending order), cap number or name of the goalkeeper (in ascending order), respectively.

Last updated: 1 April 2021.

Legend and abbreviation

- – Hosts
- Eff % – Save efficiency (Saves / Shots)

Year	Cap No.	Goalkeeper	Birth	Age	ISHOF member	Note	Ref
1900		Georg Hax	1870	29		The only goalkeeper in the squad	
1928 (gold)		Johann Blank	1904	24			
1928 (gold)		Erich Rademacher	1901	27	1972		
1932 (silver)		Hans Eckstein	1908	23			
1932 (silver)		Erich Rademacher (2)	1901	31	1972		
1936 (silver)		Paul Klingenburg	1907	28			
1936 (silver)		Fritz Stolze	1910	25			
1952		Emil Bildstein	1931	21			
1952		Günter Heine	1919	32			
1956		Emil Bildstein (2)	1931	25			
1956		Karl Neuse	1930	25			
1960		Emil Bildstein (3)	1931	29			
1960		Hans Hoffmeister	1936	24			
1964		Heinz Mäder	1937	27			
1964		Peter Schmidt	1937	26			
1968	1	Hans Hoffmeister (2)	1936	32			
1968	11	Günter Kilian	1950	18			
1972	1	Gerd Olbert	1948	24			
1972	11	Hans Hoffmeister (3)	1936	36			
1976	1	Günter Kilian (2)	1950	26			
1976	11	Peter Röhle	1957	19			
1984 (bronze)	1	Peter Röhle (2)	1957	27			
1984 (bronze)	12	Santiago Chalmovsky	1959	25			
1988	1	Peter Röhle (3)	1957	31			
1988	7	Ingo Borgmann	1965	23			
1992	1	Ingo Borgmann (2)	1965	27			
1992	5	Peter Röhle (4)	1957	35			

Year	Cap No.	Goalkeeper	Birth	Age	Saves	Shots	Eff %	ISHOF member	Note	Ref
1996	1	Ingo Borgmann (3)	1965	31	51	111	45.9%		Starting goalkeeper	
1996	9	Daniel Voß	1971	25	2	3	66.7%			
2004	1	Alexander Tchigir (2)	1968	35	39	80	48.8%		Starting goalkeeper	
2004	2	Michael Zellmer	1977	27	3	6	50.0%			
2008	1	Alexander Tchigir (3)	1968	39	63	130	48.5%		Starting goalkeeper	
2008	13	Michael Zellmer (2)	1977	31	0	0	—			

Sources:

- Official Reports (PDF): 1996 (pp. 57–61, 67–69);
- Official Results Books (PDF): 2004 (pp. 199–200), 2008 (pp. 196–197).

Notes:

- Alexander Tchigir is also listed in Unified Team men's Olympic water polo team records and statistics.

=== Top sprinters ===
The following table is pre-sorted by number of total sprints won (in descending order), year of the last Olympic appearance (in ascending order), year of the first Olympic appearance (in ascending order), name of the sprinter (in ascending order), respectively.

* Number of sprinters (30+ sprints won, since 2000): 0

- Number of sprinters (20–29 sprints won, since 2000): 1
- Number of sprinters (10–19 sprints won, since 2000): 0
- Number of sprinters (5–9 sprints won, since 2000): 1
- Last updated: 15 May 2021.

Abbreviation

- Eff % – Efficiency (Sprints won / Sprints contested)

Male players with 5 or more sprints won at the Olympics (statistics since 2000)
Rk	Sprinter	Birth	Total sprints won	Total sprints contested	Eff %	Water polo tournaments (sprints won / contested)					Age of first/last	ISHOF member	Note	Ref
Rk	Sprinter	Birth	Total sprints won	Total sprints contested	Eff %	1	2	3	4	5	Age of first/last	ISHOF member	Note	Ref
1	Tobias Kreuzmann	1981	25	34	73.5%	2004 (17/22)	2008 (8/12)				23/27			
2	Moritz Oeler	1985	8	16	50.0%	2008 (8/16)					22/22			

- Official Results Books (PDF): 2004 (pp. 199–200), 2008 (pp. 196–197).

== Olympic champions ==
=== 1928 Summer Olympics ===
- Edition of men's tournament: 7th
- Host city: Amsterdam, Netherlands
- Number of participating teams: 14
- Competition format: Single-elimination tournament; Bergvall system for third-place
- Champion: Germany (1st title)

Match	Round	Date	Opponent	Result	Goals for	Goals against	Goal diff.
Match 1/3	Quarter-finals	6 August 1928	Belgium	Won	5	3	2
Match 2/3	Semi-finals	7 August 1928	Great Britain	Won	8	5	3
Match 3/3	Gold medal match	10 August 1928	Hungary	Won	5	2	3
Total	Matches played: 3 • Wins: 3 • Ties: 0 • Defeats: 0 • Win %: 100%				18	10	8

Source: Official Reports (PDF): 1928 (pp. 803, 804, 806).

- Head coach: (Germany)

Roster
#	Player	Pos	Height	Weight	Date of birth	Age of winning gold	Oly debut	ISHOF member
P1	Max Amann	FP			19 January 1905	23 years, 205 days	Yes	
P2	Karl Bähre	FP			11 April 1899	29 years, 122 days	Yes	
P3	Emil Benecke	FP	1.73 m (5 ft 8 in)		4 October 1898	29 years, 312 days	Yes	
P4	Johann Blank	GK			17 April 1904	24 years, 116 days	Yes	
P5	Otto Cordes	FP			31 August 1905	22 years, 346 days	Yes	
P6	Fritz Gunst	FP			22 September 1908	19 years, 324 days	Yes	1990
P7	Erich Rademacher	GK			9 June 1901	27 years, 63 days	Yes	1972
P8	Joachim Rademacher	FP			20 June 1906	22 years, 52 days	Yes	
Average					17 September 1903	24 years, 329 days		

Note: Erich Rademacher and Joachim Rademacher are brothers.
Sources:

- Official Reports (PDF): 1928 (pp. 803, 804, 806);
- Olympedia: 1928 (men's tournament);
- Sports Reference: 1928 (men's tournament);
- ISHOF.

== See also ==
- List of men's Olympic water polo tournament records and statistics
- Lists of Olympic water polo records and statistics
- Germany at the Summer Olympics
- United Team of Germany at the Olympics
- West Germany at the Olympics

== Sources ==
=== Official Reports (IOC) ===
PDF documents in the LA84 Foundation Digital Library:

- Official Report of the 1896 Olympic Games (download, archive)
- Official Report of the 1900 Olympic Games (download, archive)
- Official Report of the 1904 Olympic Games (download, archive)
- Official Report of the 1908 Olympic Games (download, archive) (pp. 359–361)
- Official Report of the 1912 Olympic Games (download, archive) (pp. 1021–1024, 1031–1037)
- Official Report of the 1920 Olympic Games (download, archive) (p. 130)
- Official Report of the 1924 Olympic Games (download, archive) (pp. 439–440, 486–494)
- Official Report of the 1928 Olympic Games (download, archive) (pp. 746–757, 797–807)
- Official Report of the 1932 Olympic Games (download, archive) (pp. 619–623, 646–652)
- Official Report of the 1936 Olympic Games, v.2 (download, archive) (pp. 345–356)
- Official Report of the 1948 Olympic Games (download, archive) (pp. 537–540, 640–647)
- Official Report of the 1952 Olympic Games (download, archive) (pp. 600–608)
- Official Report of the 1956 Olympic Games (download, archive) (pp. 592–594, 624–627)
- Official Report of the 1960 Olympic Games (download, archive) (pp. 552–555, 617–634)
- Official Report of the 1964 Olympic Games, v.2 (download, archive) (pp. 682–698)
- Official Report of the 1968 Olympic Games, v.3 (download, archive) (pp. 449–466, 811–826)
- Official Report of the 1972 Olympic Games, v.3 (download, archive) (pp. 331, 353–365)
- Official Report of the 1976 Olympic Games, v.3 (download, archive) (pp. 446–447, 484–497)
- Official Report of the 1980 Olympic Games, v.3 (download, archive) (pp. 458, 495–510)
- Official Report of the 1984 Olympic Games, v.2 (download, archive) (pp. 528–534)
- Official Report of the 1988 Olympic Games, v.2 (download, archive) (pp. 590–598)
- Official Report of the 1992 Olympic Games, v.5 (download, archive) (pp. 354, 386–400)
- Official Report of the 1996 Olympic Games, v.3 (download, archive) (pp. 56–73)

=== Official Results Books (IOC) ===
PDF documents in the LA84 Foundation Digital Library:

- Official Results Book – 2000 Olympic Games – Water Polo (download, archive)
- Official Results Book – 2004 Olympic Games – Water Polo (download, archive)
- Official Results Book – 2008 Olympic Games – Water Polo (download, archive)

PDF documents on the FINA website:

- Official Results Book – 2012 Olympic Games – Diving, Swimming, Synchronised Swimming, Water Polo (archive) (pp. 284–507)

PDF documents in the Olympic World Library:

- Official Results Book – 2016 Olympic Games – Water Polo (archive)

PDF documents on the International Olympic Committee website:

- Official Results Book – 2020 Olympic Games – Water Polo (archive)
- Official Results Book – 2024 Olympic Games – Water Polo

=== Official Reports (FINA) ===
PDF documents on the FINA website:

- HistoFINA – Water polo medalists and statistics (as of September 2019) (archive) (pp. 4–13)
- 1870–2020 | 150 years of Water Polo – Evolution of its rules (archive)

=== Official website (IOC) ===
Water polo on the International Olympic Committee website:

- Water polo
- Men's water polo

=== Olympedia ===
Water polo on the Olympedia website:

- Water polo Archived 2021-12-28 at the Wayback Machine
- Men's water polo
- Athlete count for water polo
- Water polo venues
- Water polo at the 1900 Summer Olympics (men's tournament)
- Water polo at the 1904 Summer Olympics (men's tournament)
- Water polo at the 1908 Summer Olympics (men's tournament)
- Water polo at the 1912 Summer Olympics (men's tournament)
- Water polo at the 1920 Summer Olympics (men's tournament)
- Water polo at the 1924 Summer Olympics (men's tournament)
- Water polo at the 1928 Summer Olympics (men's tournament)
- Water polo at the 1932 Summer Olympics (men's tournament)
- Water polo at the 1936 Summer Olympics (men's tournament)
- Water polo at the 1948 Summer Olympics (men's tournament)
- Water polo at the 1952 Summer Olympics (men's tournament)
- Water polo at the 1956 Summer Olympics (men's tournament)
- Water polo at the 1960 Summer Olympics (men's tournament)
- Water polo at the 1964 Summer Olympics (men's tournament)
- Water polo at the 1968 Summer Olympics (men's tournament)
- Water polo at the 1972 Summer Olympics (men's tournament)
- Water polo at the 1976 Summer Olympics (men's tournament)
- Water polo at the 1980 Summer Olympics (men's tournament)
- Water polo at the 1984 Summer Olympics (men's tournament)
- Water polo at the 1988 Summer Olympics (men's tournament)
- Water polo at the 1992 Summer Olympics (men's tournament)
- Water polo at the 1996 Summer Olympics (men's tournament)
- Water polo at the 2000 Summer Olympics (men's tournament)
- Water polo at the 2004 Summer Olympics (men's tournament)
- Water polo at the 2008 Summer Olympics (men's tournament)
- Water polo at the 2012 Summer Olympics (men's tournament)
- Water polo at the 2016 Summer Olympics (men's tournament)
- Water polo at the 2020 Summer Olympics (men's tournament)

=== Sports Reference ===
Water polo on the Sports Reference website:

- Country Medal Leaders & Athlete Medal Leaders (1900–2016) (archived)
- Men's water polo (1900–2016) (archived)
- Water polo at the 1900 Summer Games (men's tournament) (archived)
- Water polo at the 1904 Summer Games (men's tournament) (archived)
- Water polo at the 1908 Summer Games (men's tournament) (archived)
- Water polo at the 1912 Summer Games (men's tournament) (archived)
- Water polo at the 1920 Summer Games (men's tournament) (archived)
- Water polo at the 1924 Summer Games (men's tournament) (archived)
- Water polo at the 1928 Summer Games (men's tournament) (archived)
- Water polo at the 1932 Summer Games (men's tournament) (archived)
- Water polo at the 1936 Summer Games (men's tournament) (archived)
- Water polo at the 1948 Summer Games (men's tournament) (archived)
- Water polo at the 1952 Summer Games (men's tournament) (archived)
- Water polo at the 1956 Summer Games (men's tournament) (archived)
- Water polo at the 1960 Summer Games (men's tournament) (archived)
- Water polo at the 1964 Summer Games (men's tournament) (archived)
- Water polo at the 1968 Summer Games (men's tournament) (archived)
- Water polo at the 1972 Summer Games (men's tournament) (archived)
- Water polo at the 1976 Summer Games (men's tournament) (archived)
- Water polo at the 1980 Summer Games (men's tournament) (archived)
- Water polo at the 1984 Summer Games (men's tournament) (archived)
- Water polo at the 1988 Summer Games (men's tournament) (archived)
- Water polo at the 1992 Summer Games (men's tournament) (archived)
- Water polo at the 1996 Summer Games (men's tournament) (archived)
- Water polo at the 2000 Summer Games (men's tournament) (archived)
- Water polo at the 2004 Summer Games (men's tournament) (archived)
- Water polo at the 2008 Summer Games (men's tournament) (archived)
- Water polo at the 2012 Summer Games (men's tournament) (archived)
- Water polo at the 2016 Summer Games (men's tournament) (archived)
- Water polo at the 2020 Summer Games (men's tournament) (archived)

=== Todor66 ===
Water polo on the Todor66 website:

- Water polo at the Summer Games
- Water polo at the 1900 Summer Olympics (men's tournament)
- Water polo at the 1904 Summer Olympics (men's tournament)
- Water polo at the 1908 Summer Olympics (men's tournament)
- Water polo at the 1912 Summer Olympics (men's tournament)
- Water polo at the 1920 Summer Olympics (men's tournament)
- Water polo at the 1924 Summer Olympics (men's tournament)
- Water polo at the 1928 Summer Olympics (men's tournament)
- Water polo at the 1932 Summer Olympics (men's tournament)
- Water polo at the 1936 Summer Olympics (men's tournament)
- Water polo at the 1948 Summer Olympics (men's tournament)
- Water polo at the 1952 Summer Olympics (men's tournament)
- Water polo at the 1956 Summer Olympics (men's tournament)
- Water polo at the 1960 Summer Olympics (men's tournament)
- Water polo at the 1964 Summer Olympics (men's tournament)
- Water polo at the 1968 Summer Olympics (men's tournament, men's qualification)
- Water polo at the 1972 Summer Olympics (men's tournament, men's qualification)
- Water polo at the 1976 Summer Olympics (men's tournament, men's European qualification)
- Water polo at the 1980 Summer Olympics (men's tournament, men's European qualification, men's world qualification)
- Water polo at the 1984 Summer Olympics (men's tournament, men's qualification)
- Water polo at the 1988 Summer Olympics (men's tournament, men's qualification)
- Water polo at the 1992 Summer Olympics (men's tournament, men's qualification)
- Water polo at the 1996 Summer Olympics (men's tournament, men's qualification)
- Water polo at the 2000 Summer Olympics (men's tournament, men's qualification)
- Water polo at the 2004 Summer Olympics (men's tournament, men's qualification)
- Water polo at the 2008 Summer Olympics (men's tournament, men's qualification)
- Water polo at the 2012 Summer Olympics (men's tournament, men's qualification)
- Water polo at the 2016 Summer Olympics (men's tournament, men's qualification)
- Water polo at the 2020 Summer Olympics (men's tournament, men's qualification)
- Water polo at the 2024 Summer Olympics (men's tournament, men's qualification)

=== ISHOF ===
International Swimming Hall of Fame (ISHOF) website:

- Honorees Listed by Category – Water Polo
- Honorees Listed by Category – Coaches
- Honorees Listed by Category – Contributors
- Honorees by Country
- Honorees By Last Name
