= Smok =

Smok, the Polish word for "dragon", may refer to:

- Michał Smok, the alias of Anna Henryka Pustowójtówna (1843−1881), Polish nationalist
- Slavic dragon, a mythical creature
  - Smok Wawelski, the Wawel Dragon, a famous dragon in Polish folklore
- Smok (archosaur), an extinct reptile genus
- Smok, the ancestor of all living Polish Lowland Sheepdogs

== See also ==
- Smaug
- Schmuck (disambiguation), a Yiddish word derived from the Polish smok
