= Johann Blank =

German water polo player

Personal information
- Born: April 17, 1904 Nuremberg, German Empire
- Died: March 15, 1983 (aged 78) Ansbach, West Germany

Sport
- Sport: Water polo
Medal record
Representing Germany
Olympic Games
Gold medal – first place	1928 Amsterdam	Team competition

Johann Blank (April 17, 1904 – March 15, 1983) was a German water polo player who competed in the 1928 Summer Olympics.

He was part of the German team which won the gold medal. He played one match as goalkeeper.

== See also ==
- Germany men's Olympic water polo team records and statistics
- List of Olympic champions in men's water polo
- List of Olympic medalists in water polo (men)
- List of men's Olympic water polo tournament goalkeepers
