= Rafael Jiménez =

Spanish water polo player (1914–1985)

Personal information
- Nationality: Spanish
- Born: 1914; Barcelona, Spain
- Died: 1985 (aged 70–71); Barcelona, Spain

Sport
- Sport: Water polo

Rafael Jiménez (1914 – 1985) was a Spanish water polo player. He competed in the men's tournament at the 1928 Summer Olympics.
