= Gerd Olbert =

German water polo player

Personal information
- Nationality: German
- Born: 1 September 1948 (age 76); Mannheim, Germany

Sport
- Sport: Water polo

Gerd Olbert (born 1 September 1948) is a German water polo player. He competed in the men's tournament at the 1972 Summer Olympics.

== See also ==
- Germany men's Olympic water polo team records and statistics
- List of men's Olympic water polo tournament goalkeepers
