= Robert Hürlimann (water polo) =

Swiss water polo player

Personal information
- Nationality: Swiss
- Born: 26 March 1905

Sport
- Sport: Water polo

Robert Hürlimann (born March 26, 1905) was a Swiss water polo player. He competed in the men's tournament at the 1928 Summer Olympics. Hürlimann is deceased.
