= Félix Unden =

Luxembourgish water polo player (1902–1989)

Personal information
- Nationality: Luxembourgish
- Born: 15 January 1902; Luxembourg, Luxembourg
- Died: 7 July 1989 (aged 87)

Sport
- Sport: Water polo

Félix Unden (15 January 1902 – 7 July 1989) was a Luxembourgish water polo player. He competed in the men's tournament at the 1928 Summer Olympics.
