= Jean Malissart =

Belgian water polo player

Jean Malisart
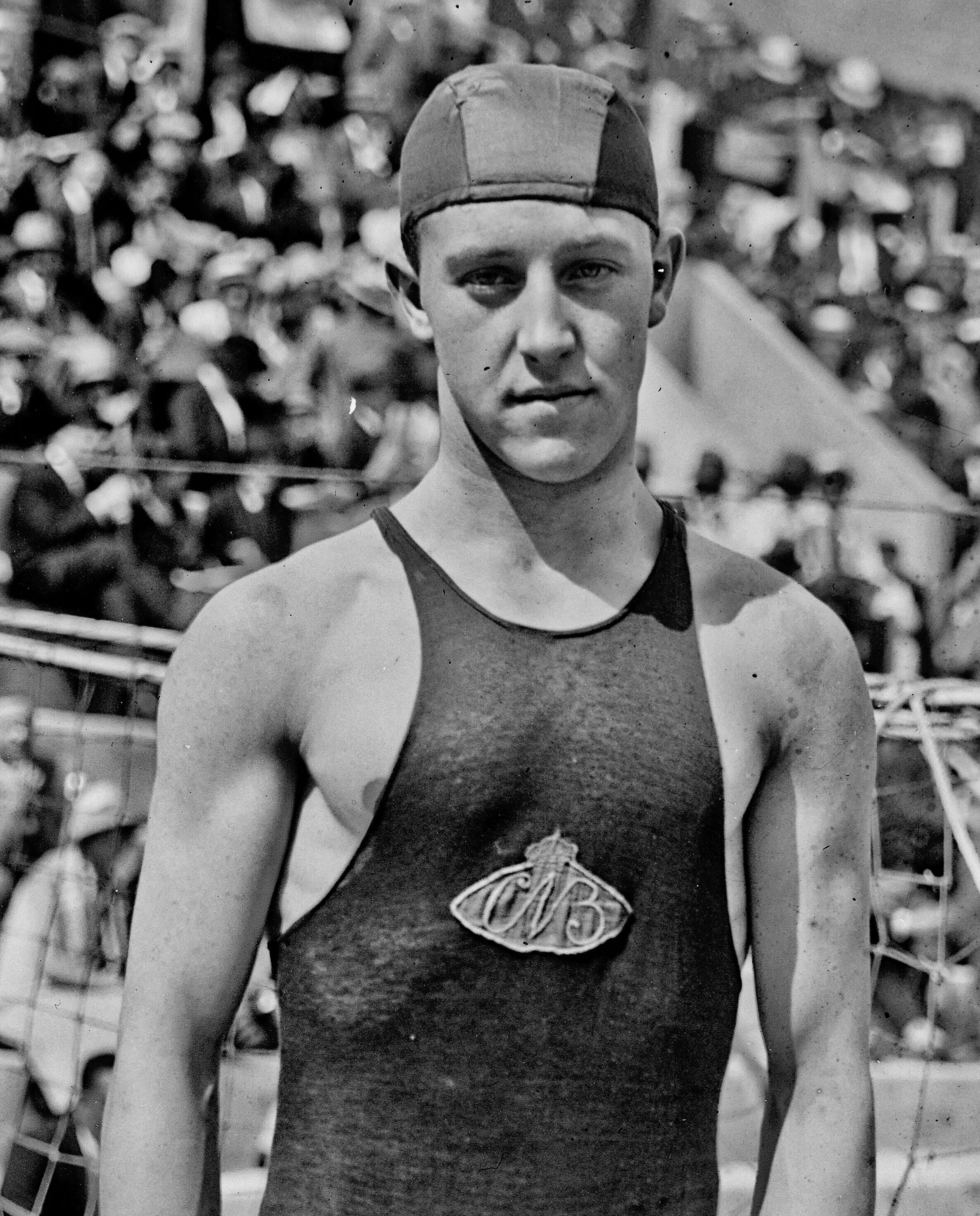
- Jean Malissart in 1925

Personal information
- Full name: Jean Cordule Pierre Malisart
- Nationality: Belgian
- Born: 28 January 1906 Brussels, Belgium

Sport
- Sport: Water polo

Jean Malisart (born 28 January 1906, death date unknown) was a Belgian water polo player. He competed in the men's tournament at the 1928 Summer Olympics.
