= Norbert Staudt =

Luxembourgish water polo player

Personal information
- Nationality: Luxembourgish
- Born: 9 June 1907; Luxembourg, Luxembourg
- Died: 18 December 1989 (aged 82); Luxembourg, Luxembourg

Sport
- Sport: Water polo

Norbert Staudt (9 June 1907 – 18 December 1989) was a Luxembourgish water polo player. He competed in the men's tournament at the 1928 Summer Olympics.
