= Karl Bähre =

German water polo player

Personal information
- Born: 11 April 1899 Hanover, German Empire
- Died: 14 January 1960 (aged 60) Hanover, West Germany

Sport
- Sport: Water polo
Medal record
Representing Germany
Olympic Games
Gold medal – first place	1928 Amsterdam	Team competition

Karl Bähre (11 April 1899 – 14 January 1960) was a German water polo player who competed in the 1928 Summer Olympics. He was part of the German team which won the gold medal. He played all three matches and scored eight goals.

== See also ==
- Germany men's Olympic water polo team records and statistics
- List of Olympic champions in men's water polo
- List of Olympic medalists in water polo (men)
