= Günter Heine =

German water polo player (born 1919)

Personal information
- Nationality: German
- Born: 8 September 1919; Berlin, Germany

Sport
- Sport: Water polo

Günter Heine (born 8 September 1919, date of death unknown) was a German water polo player. He competed in the men's tournament at the 1952 Summer Olympics. Heine is deceased.

== See also ==
- Germany men's Olympic water polo team records and statistics
- List of men's Olympic water polo tournament goalkeepers
