= Mariano Trigo =

Spanish water polo player (1900–1990)

Personal information
- Born: August 31, 1900; Barcelona, Spain
- Died: August 3, 1990 (aged 89); Barcelona, Spain

Sport
- Sport: Water polo

Marino Trigo Serrano (31 August 1900 – 3 August 1990) was a Spanish water polo player who competed in the 1928 Summer Olympics. He was part of the Spanish team in the 1928 tournament. He played in the only match for Spain.
