= Karl Neuse =

German water polo player (1930–2022)

Personal information
- Nationality: German
- Born: 31 December 1930; Hanover, Prussia, Germany
- Died: 6 April 2022 (aged 91); Hanover, Lower Saxony, Germany

Sport
- Sport: Water polo

Karl Neuse (31 December 1930 – 6 April 2022) was a German water polo player. He competed in the men's tournament at the 1956 Summer Olympics.

Neuse's club team was Wasserfreunde 98 Hannover.

== See also ==
- Germany men's Olympic water polo team records and statistics
- List of men's Olympic water polo tournament goalkeepers
