= Jules Staudt =

Luxembourgish water polo player

Personal information
- Nationality: Luxembourgish
- Born: 7 December 1908; Luxembourg, Luxembourg
- Died: 5 November 1966 (aged 57); Luxembourg, Luxembourg

Sport
- Sport: Water polo

Jules Staudt (7 December 1908 – 5 November 1966) was a Luxembourgish water polo player. He competed in the men's tournament at the 1928 Summer Olympics.
