= César Vásquez =

Argentine water polo player

Personal information
- Nationality: Argentine
- Born: 1902

Sport
- Sport: Water polo

César Vásquez (born 1902, date of death unknown) was an Argentine water polo player. He competed in the men's tournament at the 1928 Summer Olympics.
