= Ricardo Bustamante =

Argentine water polo player

Personal information
- Nationality: Argentine
- Born: January 1, 1901
- Died: September 26, 1936 (aged 35) Posadas, Misiones, Argentina

Sport
- Sport: Water polo

Ricardo Bustamante (1 January 1901 – 26 September 1936) was an Argentine water polo player. He competed in the men's tournament at the 1928 Summer Olympics.

Bustamante died on 26 September 1936 when the plane he was piloting crashed in Posadas, Misiones.
