= Jan Scholte =

Dutch water polo player (1910–1976)

Personal information
- Born: January 5, 1910; Weesp, Netherlands
- Died: June 1, 1976 (aged 66); Amsterdam, Netherlands

Sport
- Sport: Water polo

Jan Hendrik Scholte (January 5, 1910 – June 1, 1976) was a Dutch water polo player who competed in the 1928 Summer Olympics. He was part of the Dutch team in the 1928 tournament. He played both matches and scored one goal.
