= Heinz Mäder =

German water polo player

Personal information
- Nationality: German
- Born: 13 April 1937 (age 87); Oberfrohna, Germany

Sport
- Sport: Water polo

Heinz Mäder (born 13 April 1937) is a German former water polo player. He competed in the men's tournament at the 1964 Summer Olympics.

== See also ==
- Germany men's Olympic water polo team records and statistics
- List of men's Olympic water polo tournament goalkeepers
