= Mario Bistoletti =

Argentine water polo player

Personal information
- Nationality: Argentine
- Born: 1905

Sport
- Sport: Water polo

Mario Bistoletti (born 1905, date of death unknown) was an Argentine water polo player. He competed in the men's tournament at the 1928 Summer Olympics.
