= Sammy Moore (water polo) =

Irish water polo player

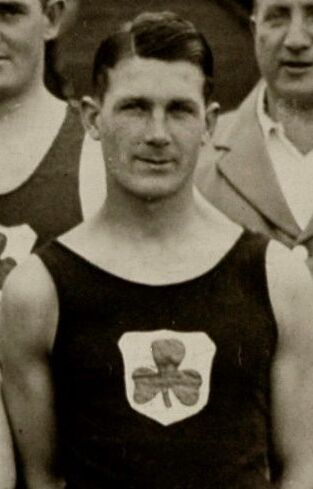
- Sammy Moore in 1928

Personal information
- Nationality: Irish
- Born: 15 September 1900
- Died: 1 March 1989 (aged 88)

Sport
- Sport: Water polo

Samuel Stewart "Sammy" Moore (15 September 1900 – 1 March 1989) was an Irish water polo player. He competed in the men's tournament at the 1928 Summer Olympics.
