= Frank Visser =

Belgian water polo player

Personal information
- Nationality: Belgian
- Born: 27 June 1907
- Died: 7 April 1975 (aged 67)

Sport
- Sport: Water polo

Frank Visser (27 June 1907 – 7 April 1975) was a Belgian water polo player. He competed in the men's tournament at the 1928 Summer Olympics.
