= Charles Mersch =

Luxembourgish water polo player

Personal information
- Nationality: Luxembourgish
- Born: 17 January 1908; Luxembourg, Luxembourg
- Died: 29 January 1996 (aged 88); Luxembourg, Luxembourg

Sport
- Sport: Water polo

Charles Mersch (17 January 1908 – 29 January 1996) was a Luxembourgish water polo player. He competed in the men's tournament at the 1928 Summer Olympics.
