= Nicholas Beaman =

British water polo player

Personal information
- Full name: Nicholas Victor Beaman
- Nationality: British
- Born: 11 June 1897 Medway, England
- Died: 1970 (aged 72–73) Northwich, England

Sport
- Sport: Water polo

Nicholas Beaman (11 June 1897 – 1970) was a British water polo player. He competed in the men's tournament at the 1928 Summer Olympics.
