= Max Amann (water polo) =

German water polo player

Personal information
- Born: 19 January 1905 Magdeburg, German Empire
- Died: 24 December 1945 (aged 40)

Sport
- Sport: Water polo
Medal record
Representing Germany
Olympic Games
Gold medal – first place	1928 Amsterdam	Team competition

Max Amann (19 January 1905 – 24 December 1945) was a German water polo player who competed in the 1928 Summer Olympics. He was part of the German team which won the gold medal. He played all three matches and scored three goals.

He was missing in action during World War II, and declared dead in December 1945.

== See also ==
- Germany men's Olympic water polo team records and statistics
- List of Olympic champions in men's water polo
- List of Olympic medalists in water polo (men)
