= Michael Zellmer =

German water polo player

Personal information
- Nationality: German
- Born: 14 August 1977 (age 48) Oldenburg, West Germany
- Height: 1.90 m (6 ft 3 in)
- Weight: 100 kg (220 lb)

Sport
- Country: Germany
- Sport: Water polo

Michael Zellmer (born 14 August 1977) is a German water polo player who competed in the 2004 Summer Olympics and 2008 Summer Olympics.

== See also ==
- Germany men's Olympic water polo team records and statistics
- List of men's Olympic water polo tournament goalkeepers
