= Eric Brochon =

Swiss water polo player

Personal information
- Full name: Eric Charles Nestor Brochon
- Nationality: Swiss
- Born: 13 July 1905; Lausanne, Switzerland
- Died: 11 March 1991 (aged 85); Lausanne, Switzerland

Sport
- Sport: Water polo

Eric Brochon (13 July 1905 – 11 March 1991) was a Swiss water polo player. He competed in the men's tournament at the 1928 Summer Olympics.
