= František Schulz =

Czech water polo player

Personal information
- Nationality: Czech

Sport
- Sport: Water polo

František Schulz was a Czech water polo player. He competed in the men's tournament at the 1928 Summer Olympics.
