= André Mélardy =

Belgian water polo player (1907–1973)

Antoine Mélardy
Personal information
- Full name: Antoine Maurice Albert Mélardi
- Nationality: Belgian
- Born: 28 April 1907; Brussels, Belgium
- Died: 4 March 1973 (aged 65); Knokke-Heist, Belgium

Sport
- Sport: Water polo

Antoine Mélardy (28 April 1907 – 4 March 1973) was a Belgian water polo player. He competed in the men's tournament at the 1928 Summer Olympics.
