= Cornelis Leenheer =

Dutch water polo player (1906–1979)

Personal information
- Born: June 5, 1906; Weesp, Netherlands
- Died: January 20, 1979 (aged 72); Zwolle, Netherlands

Sport
- Sport: Water polo

Cornelis Coenraad Leenheer (June 5, 1906 – January 20, 1979) was a Dutch water polo player who competed in the 1928 Summer Olympics. He was part of the Dutch team in the 1928 tournament. He played both matches and scored four goals.
