= Michal Schmuck =

Czechoslovak water polo player

Personal information
- Nationality: Slovak
- Born: Michal Schmuck; 9 January 1909 Oroszvár, Austria-Hungary
- Died: 11 June 1980 (aged 71) Bratislava, Czechoslovakia

Sport
- Country: Czechoslovakia
- Sport: Water polo, swimming
- Club: PTE Bratislava (1924-1931); AC Sparta Praha (1931-1939)
- Coached by: Ľudovít Stahl

Michal Schmuck (9 January 1909 – 11 June 1980) was a Czechoslovak/Slovak water polo player who competed at the 1928 Summer Olympics and 1936 Summer Olympics. He also competed at the 1934 European Water Polo Championship, representing Czechoslovakia.

== Biography ==
Michal Schmuck was born in Oroszvár, close to the Pressburg/Pozsony, Austria-Hungary (today Bratislava, Slovakia) in the Schmuck family. He was engaged in Competitive swimming and water polo since 1924 in Slovak sports club PTE Bratislava (Polgári Torna Egyesület) in Bratislava. In water polo, he played in the position of center and from 1927 he was the support of the Czechoslovak national team in attack. The national team benefited for many years from the interplay with his club colleague Pavol Steiner.

In 1928 he was part of the Czechoslovak team in the Olympic tournament in Amsterdam. He played the only match. In 1931 his club PTE Bratislava ran into financial problems and in May he transferred from PTE to AC Sparta Praha. In Prague he previously studied at the ČVUT. In December 1932, he completed his studies and became an electrical engineer.

In 1934, he played for the first time at a big tournament, at the European Championship in Magdeburg together with his younger brother Karel Schmuck. In 1936, both represented at the Olympic Games in Berlin. In 1937, he married the Czech swimmer Marie Tautermannová. They had four sons – Michal, Ján, Karol and Martin. They all represented Czechoslovakia in water polo. Grandson Karol already represented independent Slovakia in water polo. He died in Bratislava, Czechoslovakia in 1980.

== Honours ==
=== Olympic Games ===
- 1928 — 9th place
- 1936 — 11th place

=== European Championship ===
- 1927 – 7th place
- 1931 – 5th place
- 1934 – 8th place
