= Hayes Dockrell =

Irish water polo player

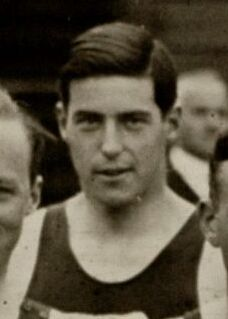
- Hayes Dockrell in 1928

Personal information
- Nationality: Irish
- Born: 16 March 1907; Dublin, Ireland
- Died: 4 January 1970 (aged 62); Northampton, England

Sport
- Sport: Water polo

Hayes Dockrell (16 March 1907 – 4 January 1970) was an Irish water polo player. He competed in the men's tournament at the 1928 Summer Olympics.
