= Schmuck (surname) =

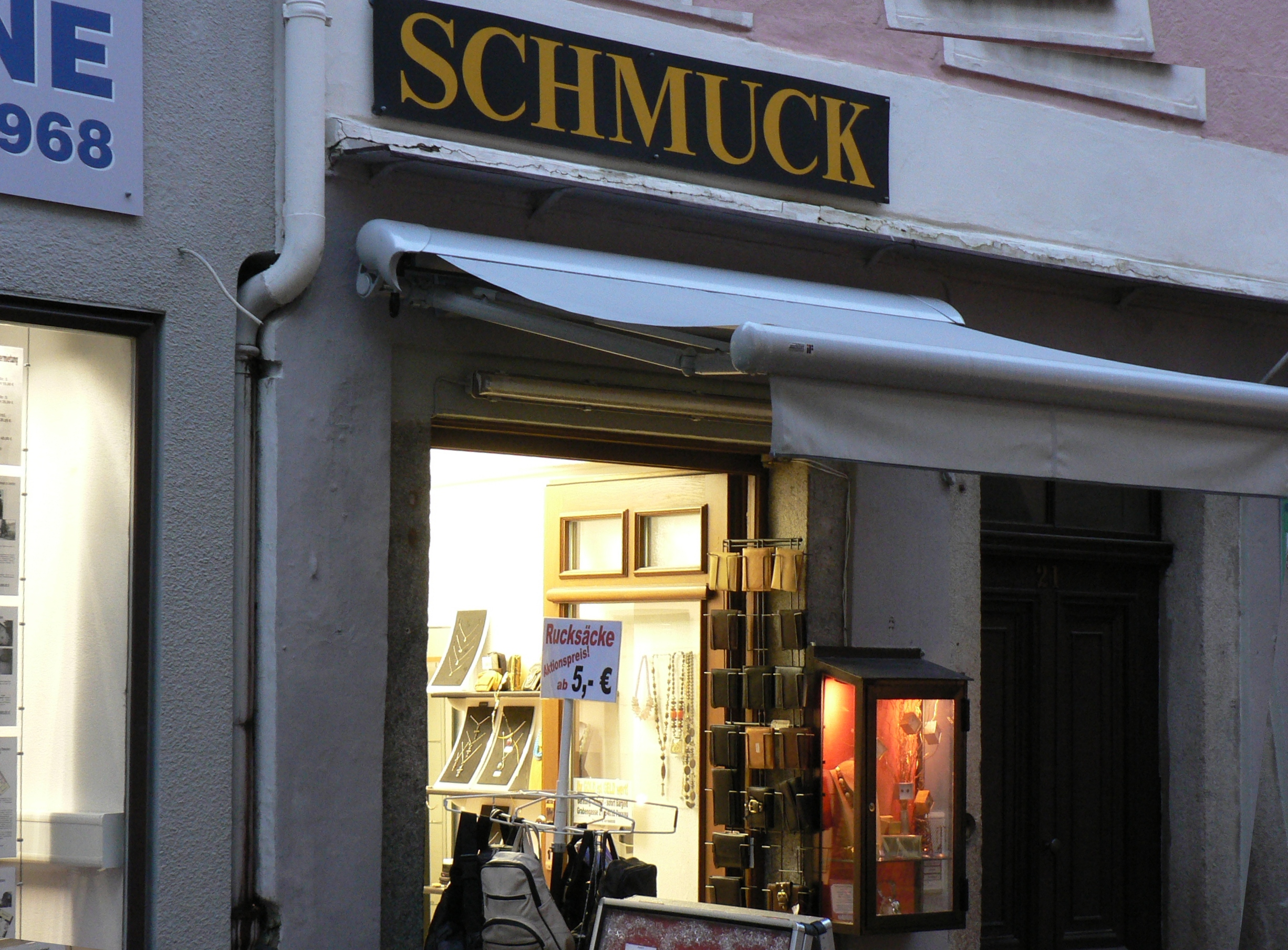
- Shop sign in Passau, Germany
- Language: German

Origin
- Meaning: Jewelry, neat
- Region of origin: Germany

Schmuck is a surname of German origin. As a noun, it means jewelry; as an adjective, it means neat in the sense of clean, tidy, or having a simple elegance. There are variations of the surname throughout Central Europe, including spelling variations of Szmuk in these countries. surnames of similar origin include Schmücking, Schmückle, Schmugge, Schmücker.

Notable people with the surname include:

- Aleksandr Shmuk, Soviet biochemist
- Andor Schmuck (1970–2025), Hungarian politician
- Christina Schmuck (born 1944), West German Olympic luger
- Donald Schmuck (1915–2004), U.S. Marine Corps brigadier general and recipient of the Navy Cross
- Hédi Fried (née Szmuk; 15 June 1924 – 19 November 2022), Swedish-Romanian-Hungarian author and psychologist
- Helmut Schmuck
- Erzsébet Schmuck (born 1954), Hungarian environmentalist, economist, and politician
- Marcus Schmuck (1925–2005), an Austrian mountaineer who led the expedition to climb the Karakoram in Pakistan
- Michal Schmuck (1909–1980) was Czechoslovak/Slovak water polo player who competed in the 1928 and 1936 Summer Olympics
- Nitza Metzger-Szmuk, Israeli architect
- Peter Schmuck (born 1955), American sports columnist

== See also ==
- Inger Smuk
- Schmuck (pejorative)
- Schmuck (disambiguation)
