= Ladislav Švehla =

Czech water polo player

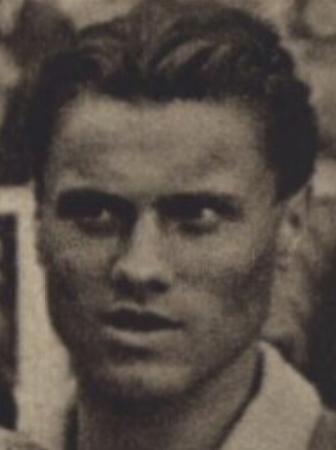

Personal information
- Nationality: Czech

Sport
- Sport: Water polo

Ladislav Švehla was a Czech water polo player. He competed in the men's tournament at the 1928 Summer Olympics.
