= Othmar Schmalz =

Swiss water polo player

Personal information
- Nationality: Swiss
- Born: 27 August 1903; Nesslau, Switzerland
- Died: 6 November 1966 (aged 63)

Sport
- Sport: Water polo

Othmar Schmalz (27 August 1903 – 6 November 1966) was a Swiss water polo player. He competed in the men's tournament at the 1928 Summer Olympics.
