= Patrick McClure (water polo) =

Irish water polo player

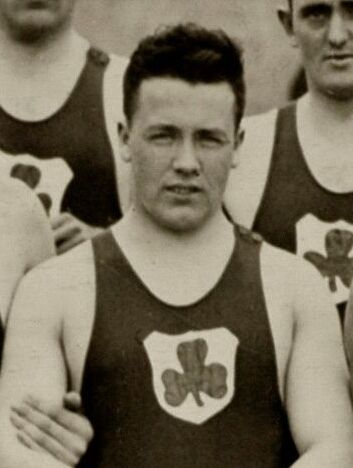
- Patrick McClure in 1928

Personal information
- Nationality: Irish
- Born: 27 March 1908
- Died: 1 December 1965 (aged 57)

Sport
- Sport: Water polo

Patrick McClure (27 March 1908 – 1 December 1965) was an Irish water polo player. He competed in the men's tournament at the 1928 Summer Olympics.
