= Louis Van Gheem =

Belgian water polo player

Personal information
- Nationality: Belgian
- Born: May 10, 1909; Brussels, Belgium
- Died: August 10, 1968 (aged 59); Anderlecht, Belgium

Sport
- Sport: Water polo

Louis Van Gheem (May 10, 1909 – August 10, 1968) was a Belgian water polo player. He competed in the men's tournament at the 1928 Summer Olympics.
