= Frans Kuijper =

Dutch water polo player (1900–1987)

Personal information
- Nationality: Dutch
- Born: 6 April 1900; Amsterdam, Netherlands
- Died: 12 March 1987 (aged 86); Bergen, Netherlands

Sport
- Sport: Water polo

Frans Kuijper or Kuyper (6 April 1900 – 12 March 1987) was a Dutch water polo player and coach. He competed in the men's tournament at the 1928 Summer Olympics.

Kuyper became coach of the Dutch Water polo team. He coached the team at four Olympic competitions, including the 1952 Summer Olympics. He was the coach of the Dutch men's team at the 1950 European Championships, just after a rule change sped up the game, and his team used that to great effect, reaching the final and beating reigning European champion Italy 9-4.
