= Luciano Rovere =

Argentine water polo player

Personal information
- Full name: Luciano Nicolás Rovere
- Nationality: Argentine
- Born: 1908

Sport
- Sport: Water polo

Luciano Nicolás Rovere (born 1908, date of death unknown) was an Argentine water polo player. He competed in the men's tournament at the 1928 Summer Olympics.
