= Manuel Majo =

Spanish water polo player (1909–1955)

Personal information
- Nationality: Spanish
- Born: 17 April 1909; Barcelona, Spain
- Died: 9 March 1955 (aged 45); Barcelona, Spain

Sport
- Sport: Water polo

Manuel Majo (17 April 1909 – 9 March 1955) was a Spanish water polo player. He competed in the men's tournament at the 1928 Summer Olympics.
