= Roger Vella =

Maltese water polo player

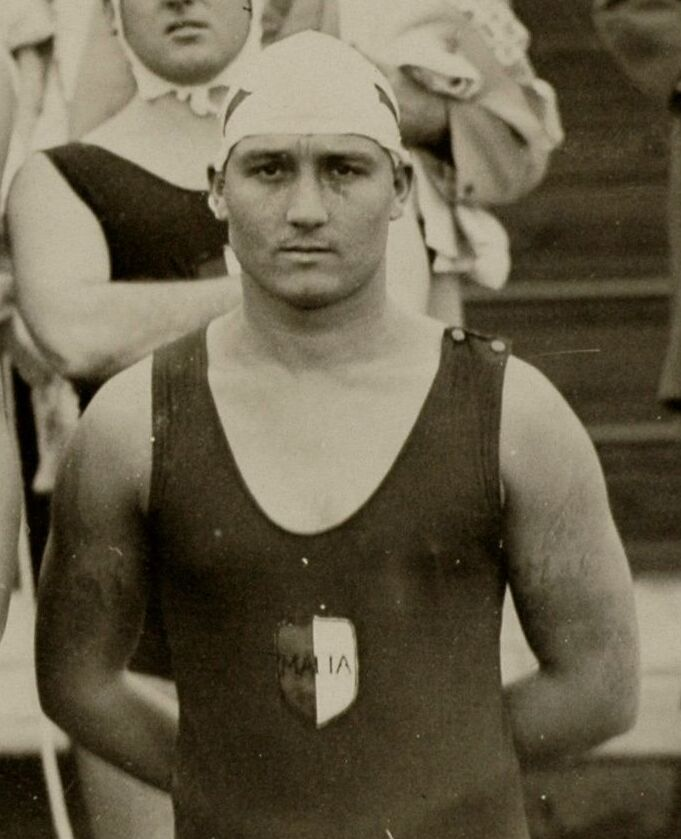
- Roger Vella in 1928

Personal information
- Nationality: Maltese
- Born: 15 January 1905

Sport
- Sport: Water polo

Roger Vella (born 15 January 1905, date of death unknown) was a Maltese water polo player. He competed in the men's tournament at the 1928 Summer Olympics.
