= Habib Painter =

Indian singer (1915–1987)

Habib Painter or Habeeb Painter (1915 – 22 February 1987) was a noted Indian Qawwal and a folk singer. There is a park named in honour of Habib Painter in Aligarh near Paan Wali Kothi named as Bulbuley Hind Habib Painter Park

== Early life ==
He was born in 1915 and brought up in Aligarh. He started his profession as a billboard painter, hence he became known as "Habib Painter". Once Rais Mirza, a host of poetry-reading events (mushairas) saw him singing Qawwali, he brought him to Delhi and introduced him as a Qawwal.

== Habib painter ==
Habib Painter is considered an important Qawwali performer in the Indian subcontinent.

He was a spiritual disciple of Sufi saint Nizamuddin Auliya and the thirteenth century legendary poet/musician Amir Khusro.

== Death ==
Habib Painter died on 22 February 1987 at age 72 after a qawwali singing career of over 50 years. He was buried in a mud grave per the Islamic tradition.

== Title ==
During the war between India and china, Indian artists contributed their voice to inspire the nation. And Habeeb, too, sang for the troops. The then Prime Minister of India Jawaharlal Nehru honoured him with the title "Bulbul-e-Hind" (Nightingale of India).

There is a park named in honour of Habib Painter in Aligarh near Paan Wali Kothi named as Bulbuley Hind Habib Painter Park.

== Notable Qawwali songs ==
- "Wo har zarre me hai"
- "Nas nas bole nabee nabee"
- "Bahuot Kathin hai dagar pan ghat ki" (Difficult access to the drinking well) (Lyrics: Amir Khusro)
- "Fana Itna to ho jaaun"
- "Baap ki naseehat beti ko" (Classic Jhankar Beats)
- "Wo sadaa chakkar me rehte haiN"
- "Nhi malum nhi malun"
- "Ghar ka bhedi lanka dhay"
- "mai ab kuch keh nahi sakta"
- "kare koi bhare koi"
- " ye meri haqiqat hai" (1986)
- "koshish na kana"
- "poshida poshida"
- "bura kisko manu, bhala kisko jaano"
- "kitni zalim hai duniya"
- "bharosa kis pe kijey ga"
- "bhagwan isi mai milte hai"
- "ranjid ranjida"
- "dedar ho jaye"
- "aaj tuna mai eysa jalungi"
- "main to anware nabi huun"
