= Norman Judd (water polo) =

Irish water polo player

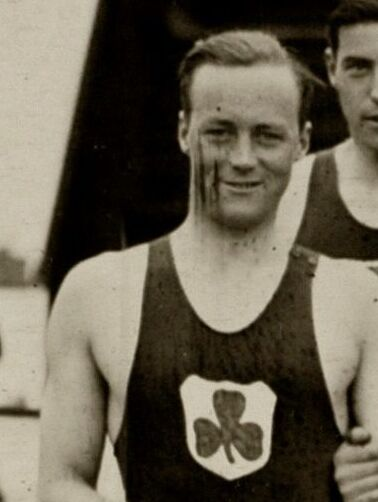
- Norman Judd in 1928

Personal information
- Nationality: Irish
- Born: 6 April 1904; Dublin, Ireland
- Died: 19 November 1980 (aged 76); Dublin, Ireland

Sport
- Sport: Water polo

Norman Judd (6 April 1904 – 19 November 1980) was an Irish water polo player. He competed in the men's tournament at the 1928 Summer Olympics.
