= Jeremy Ellis =

English cricketer

Jeremy Ellis (15 February 1866 – 14 August 1943) was an English cricketer active from 1892 to 1898 who played for Lancashire. He was born in Bury and died in Billington. He appeared in six first-class matches as a lefthanded batsman who bowled left arm medium pace. He scored 56 runs with a highest score of 26* and held five catches. He took 21 wickets with a best analysis of eight for 21.
