= Louis Darmanin =

Maltese water polo player

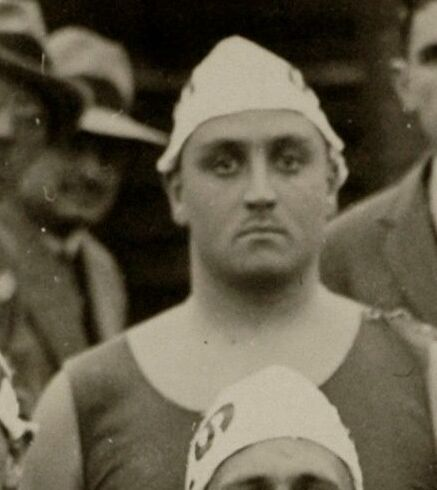
- Louis Darmanin in 1928

Personal information
- Nationality: Maltese
- Born: 19 November 1908
- Died: July 16, 1995 (aged 86)

Sport
- Sport: Water polo

Louis Darmanin (19 November 1908 – 16 July 1995) was a Maltese water polo player. He competed in the men's tournament at the 1928 Summer Olympics.
