= Harry Bonavia =

Maltese water polo player

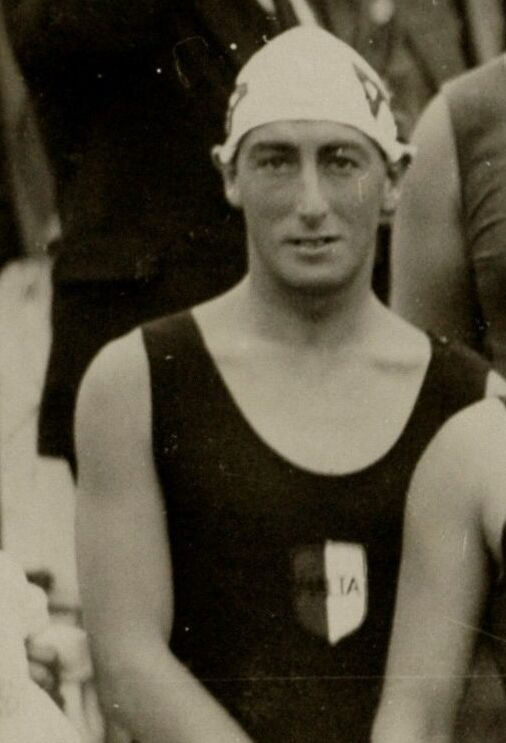

Personal information
- Full name: Henry Arthur Bonavia
- Nationality: Maltese
- Born: 4 January 1908; Sliema, Malta

Sport
- Sport: Water polo

Harry Arthur Bonavia (born 4 January 1908, date of death unknown) was a Maltese water polo player. He competed in the men's tournament at the 1928 Summer Olympics.
