= Arthur Luck =

English cricketer

Personal information
- Full name: Arthur Luck
- Born: 19 January 1916; Little Billing, Northamptonshire, England
- Died: 24 February 1987 (aged 71); Gloucester, Gloucestershire, England
- Batting: Right-handed
- Bowling: Right-arm medium

Domestic team information
- Years: Team
- 1937–1938: Northamptonshire

Career statistics
Competition	First-class
Matches	2
Runs scored	52
Batting average	13.00
100s/50s	–/–
Top score	18
Balls bowled	252
Wickets	2
Bowling average	77.50
5 wickets in innings	–
10 wickets in match	–
Best bowling	1/34
Catches/stumpings	–/–
- Source: Cricinfo, 18 November 2011

Arthur Luck (19 January 1916 – 24 February 1987) was an English cricketer. Luck was a right-handed batsman who bowled right-arm medium pace. He was born at Little Billing, Northamptonshire.

Luck made two first-class appearances for Northamptonshire, both against Warwickshire in the 1937 County Championship and 1938 County Championship. In his first match against Warwickshire, he scored 18 runs in Northamptonshire's first-innings, before becoming one of seven wickets for Eric Hollies. In their second-innings, he was dismissed for the same score by George Paine. In Warwickshire's first-innings, he took the wicket of Aubrey Hill. In his second match against the county, Luck scored 15 runs in Northamptonshire's first-innings, before being dismissed by Eric Hollies, while in their second-innings the same bowler dismissed him for a single run. In Warwickshire's first-innings, Luck took the wicket of Reg Santall. Warwickshire won both matches.

He died at the Gloucestershire Royal Hospital in Gloucester on 24 February 1987.
