= Clifford Bias =

20th-century American psychic

- Born: 15 September 1910; Huntington, West Virginia, U.S.
- Died: 1 December 1987 (aged 77); New York, U.S.
- Occupations: Occultist, author, spiritualist minister
- Writing career
- Genres: Occult, mysticism, spiritualism
- Notable works: Qabalah, Tarot & the Western Mystery Tradition; The Probationer’s Handbook; Ritual Book of Magic
- Literary movement: Spiritualism, Western esotericism

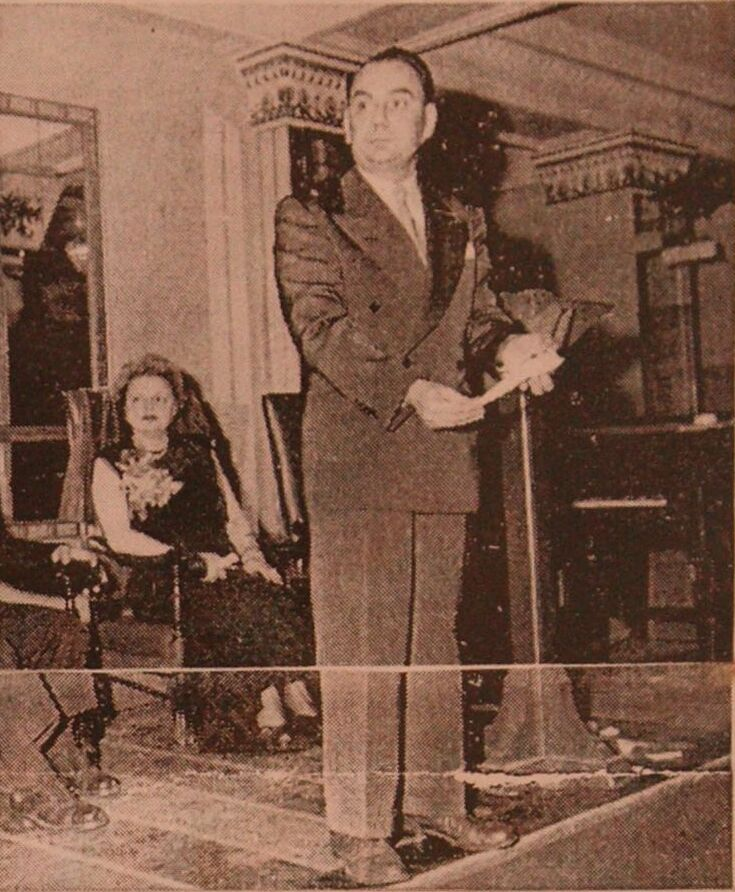
Bias speaks at the American Foundation for Psychic Research conference in New York City, 1950.

Clifford Bias (1910–1987) was a prominent American alleged psychic in the early 20th-century. Born in Huntington, West Virginia, he claimed that he had been able to communicate with people who had long since died from the age of five. He was ordained into the ministry in 1937 and served as a minister of churches in Jackson, Michigan; Buffalo, New York; Toledo, Ohio; St. Petersburg, Florida; and New York City. He helped organize the Spiritualist-Episcopal Church and the Universal Spiritualist Association and served as educational director and president of the Indiana Association of Spiritualists of Camp Chesterfield, Indiana. He was Dean of the Universal Spiritualist Institute, which held sessions each summer on various Mid-Western college campuses.

Bias organized a magical study group known as the Ancient Mystical Order of Seekers (A.M.O.S.) and he wrote and published a series of A.M.O.S. books, including The Probationer, L.V.X. The Book of Light, Sepher Yetzirah and the 32 Paths of Wisdom, The Neophyte, The Tarot – The Book of Thoth, The Way Back, The Western Mystery Tradition, and Qabalah, Tarot and the Western Mystery Tradition. His Ritual Book of Magic was published by Samuel Weiser in 1981. He is also featured in The Hierophant of 100th Street' by Cullen Dorn. In the late 1970s, he led a series of quasi-religious services for psychics and mediums in the chapel located off of the lobby in The Ansonia Hotel in New York City. He retired in 1985 and settled in Anderson, Indiana, where he died aged 76 on 13 February 1987. His publications include:

- Ritual Book of Magic
- Qabalah, Tarot & the Western Mystery Tradition: The 22 Connecting Paths
- The Way Back: A New Age Approach to the Western Mystery Tradition
- Trumpet Mediumship and Its Development
- A Manual of White Magic: Rituals, Spells, and Incantations
- The A.M.O.S. Path of Light
- The Art of Astrological Synthesis
- Say Yes by Clifford Bias (corarichmondbooks.com)
- New Age Mediumship by Clifford Bias (corarichmondbooks.com)
