= Tsai Lan-chin =

Taiwanese singer and songwriter

- 蔡藍欽
- Born: 15 November 1964; Taipei, Taiwan
- Died: 14 February 1987 (aged 22); Taipei, Taiwan
- Education: National Taiwan University
- Occupations: Singer, songwriter

Tsai Lan-chin (Chinese: 蔡藍欽; pinyin: Cài Lánqīn (15 November 1964 – 14 February 1987) was a Taiwanese singer and songwriter.

== Early life ==
As a child, he showed a talent for music and painting. He started learning piano at the age of 6. He attended Taipei Municipal Jianguo High School and studied mechanical engineering at National Taiwan University.

Due to poor health, he took a leave of absence during his first year. He briefly attended Pingtung Extension School of Agriculture before returning to NTU.

== Career ==
He began writing songs and performing at concerts at the age of 21. His only album, 這個世界 (zhè gè shìjiè – This World), was released posthumously.

== Legacy ==
Despite releasing only one album, his songs are still remembered in Taiwan even 20 years after his death. The song This World 這個世界 has been covered by various artists such as Deserts Chang, Mayday, and Stefanie Sun.

== Death ==
Due to poor health, he died at the age of 22 at National Taiwan University Hospital from a heart attack.
