= Georges Bauer =

Luxembourgish water polo player

Personal information
- Nationality: Luxembourgish
- Born: 29 September 1904; Differdange, Luxembourg
- Died: 4 February 1987 (aged 82); Soleuvre, Luxembourg

Sport
- Sport: Water polo

Georges Bauer (29 September 1904 – 4 February 1987) was a Luxembourgish water polo player. He competed in the men's tournament at the 1928 Summer Olympics.
