= Gunnar Böös =

Swedish fencer

Personal information
- Born: 30 May 1894 Lund, Sweden
- Died: 4 February 1987 (aged 92) Stockholm, Sweden

Sport
- Sport: Fencing

Gunnar Böös (30 May 1894 – 4 February 1987) was a Swedish fencer. He competed in the individual foil event at the 1912 Summer Olympics.
