= Schmuck =

Schmuck may refer to:

- Schmuck (pejorative), a common pejorative of Yiddish origin
- Schmuck (surname), a surname of German origin
- Schmuck v. United States, a criminal case decided by the U.S. Supreme Court in 1989.
