= Walker Ellis =

English cricketer

Walker Ellis (27 January 1895 – 25 November 1974) was an English cricketer active from 1920 to 1923 who played for Lancashire. He was born in Summerseat, Lancashire and died in Eccleston, Lancashire. He appeared in 36 first-class matches as a righthanded batsman, scoring 846 runs with a highest score of 138* and held 13 catches.
