= Howard Steel =

Australian rules footballer, born 1911

Personal information
- Full name: Howard Steel
- Born: 14 May 1911
- Died: 12 February 1987 (aged 75)
- Original team: Brunswick (VFA)
- Height: 189 cm (6 ft 2 in)
- Weight: 82 kg (181 lb)

Playing career^{1}
Years	Club	Games (Goals)
1930–32	Melbourne	9 (3)
- ^{1} Playing statistics correct to the end of 1932.

Howard Steel (14 May 1911 – 12 February 1987) was an Australian rules footballer who played with Melbourne in the Victorian Football League (VFL).
