= Koos Köhler =

Dutch water polo player (1905–1965)

Personal information
- Born: November 25, 1905 Amsterdam, Netherlands
- Died: February 6, 1965 (aged 59) Sloten, Netherlands

Sport
- Sport: Water polo

Johannes Jacobus "Koos" Köhler (25 November 1905 – 6 February 1965) was a Dutch water polo player. He competed at the 1928 Summer Olympics, where the Dutch team shared fifth place. Köhler played all three matches, together with his cousin Sjaak, and scored seven goals.
