= Sjaak Köhler =

Dutch water polo player (1902–1970)

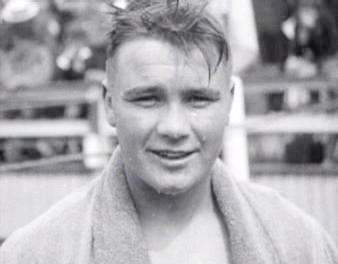
- Sjaak Köhler in 1922

Personal information
- Full name: Jakob Frederik Köhler
- Born: 2 October 1902 Amsterdam, the Netherlands
- Died: 19 June 1970 (aged 67) Amsterdam, the Netherlands

Sport
- Sport: Water polo, swimming
- Club: Het Y, Amsterdam

Jakob Frederik "Sjaak" Köhler (2 October 1902 – 19 June 1970) was a Dutch water polo player and swimmer. He finished in seventh and fifth place with the Dutch water polo team at the 1924 and 1928 Olympics; at both Games he played three matches and scored four and two goals, respectively. In 1924 he also competed in two freestyle swimming events (400 m and 4 × 200 m relay), but failed to reach the finals. His cousin Koos played water polo alongside Sjaak at the 1928 Olympics.
