= Vladimir Vyshpolsky =

Soviet fencer (1915–1987)

Personal information
- Born: 28 December 1915 Omsk, Russian Empire
- Died: 18 February 1987 (aged 71) Leningrad, Soviet Union

Sport
- Sport: Fencing

Vladimir Vyshpolsky (Russian: Владимир Владимирович Вышпольский; 28 December 1915 – 18 February 1987) was a Soviet fencer. He competed in the team sabre event at the 1952 Summer Olympics.
