= John Blackburn (cricketer) =

English cricketer

John Derek Hepburn Blackburn (27 October 1924 – 19 February 1987) was an English first-class cricketer, who played one game for Yorkshire County Cricket Club against Cambridge University at Fenner's in May 1956. A right-handed batsman he batted at number 6, and scored 15 and 3 as the match ended in a draw.

Blackburn was born in Headingley, Leeds, Yorkshire, England. He played Yorkshire's Second XI from 1949 to 1967, batting at number 11 in his final game at the age of 43. An attractive hard-hitting batsman, he was possibly a contender for the Yorkshire captaincy when Ronnie Burnet was appointed skipper in 1958. He was captain of Bradford Cricket Club from 1954 to 1962, lending them to three Priestley Cup victories. An insurance broker, he was elected to the Yorkshire committee in 1966, and became president of Bradford C.C.

Blackburn died, aged 62, in February 1987 in Steeton, Keighley.
