= Victor Pace =

Maltese water polo player

Personal information
- Nationality: Maltese
- Born: 3 May 1907 Sliema, British Malta
- Died: 8 April 2001 (aged 93) Sliema, British Malta

Sport
- Sport: Water polo

Victor Pace (3 May 1907 – 8 April 2001) was a Maltese water polo player. He competed in the men's tournament at the 1928 Summer Olympics.

== Sports career ==
Pace participated in Malta's Olympic debut in Water polo at the 1928 Summer Olympics in Amsterdam (these were his only Olympic Games). Pace's club affiliation was Sliema United, renamed Sliema A.S.C. Sliema Aquatic Sports Club in 1930.

Later in life he was elected President of the National Olympic Committee of Malta from 1968 to 1973.
