= Francisco Nappa =

Maltese water polo player

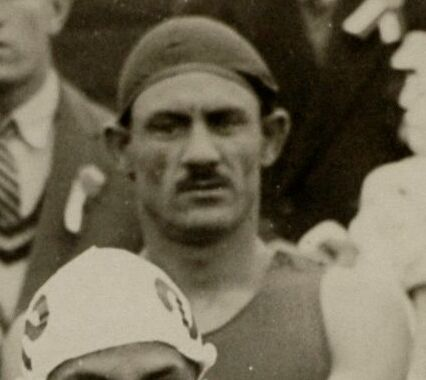
- Francisco Nappa in 1928

Personal information
- Nationality: Maltese
- Born: 16 December 1898; Valletta, Malta

Sport
- Sport: Water polo

Francisco Nappa (born 16 December 1898, date of death unknown) was a Maltese water polo player. He competed in the men's tournament at the 1928 Summer Olympics.
