= Turu Rizzo =

Maltese water polo player

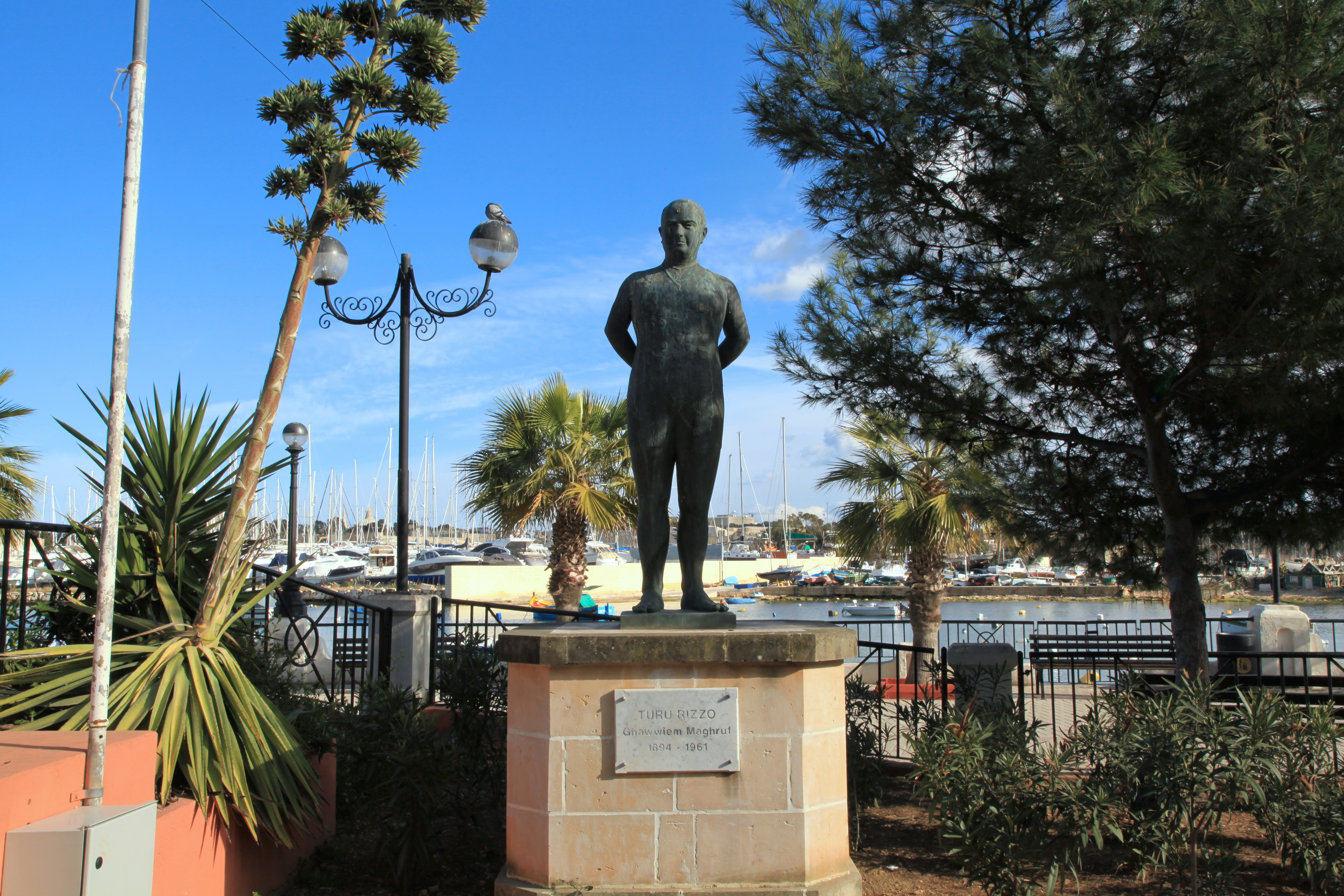
- Statue of Rizzo in Gżira

Personal information
- Nationality: Maltese
- Born: 13 March 1894; Sliema, Malta
- Died: 23 May 1961 (aged 67)

Sport
- Sport: Water polo

Turu Rizzo (13 March 1894 – 23 May 1961) was a Maltese water polo player. He competed in the men's tournament at the 1928 Summer Olympics.
