= Victor Busietta =

Maltese water polo player

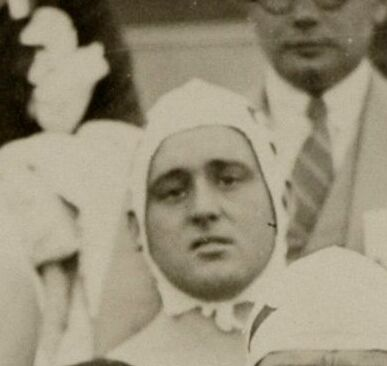
- Victor Busietta in 1928

Personal information
- Nationality: Maltese

Sport
- Sport: Water polo

Victor F. Busietta was a Maltese water polo player. He competed in the men's tournament at the 1928 Summer Olympics.
