= Carmelo Busietta =

Maltese water polo player (1902–1983)

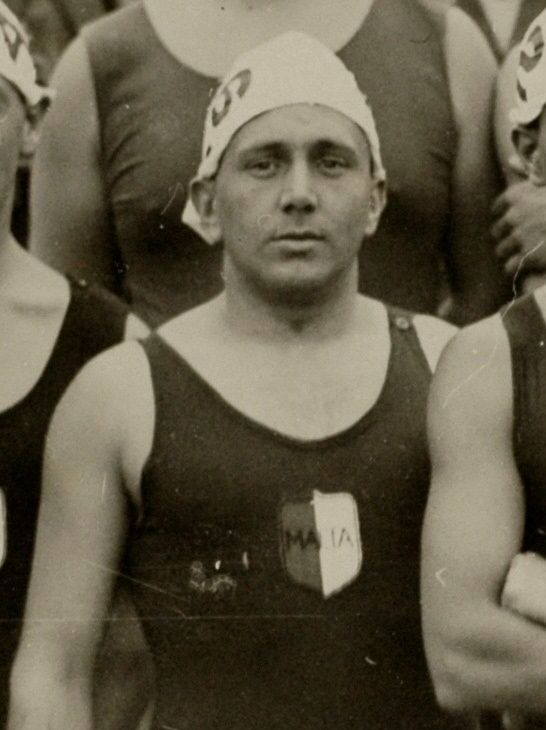
- Carmelo Busietta in 1928

Personal information
- Full name: Carmelo Lorenzo Busietta
- Nationality: Maltese
- Born: 10 August 1902; Sliema, Malta
- Died: 11 July 1983 (aged 80); Malvern East, Victoria, Australia

Sport
- Sport: Water polo

Carmelo L. Busietta, also known as Meme Busietta (10 August 1902 – 11 July 1983), was a Maltese water polo player. He competed in the men's tournament at the 1928 Summer Olympics.
