= Water polo at the 1928 Summer Olympics =

Coordinates: 52.3475°N 4.8561°E

Men's water polo at the Games of the IX Olympiad
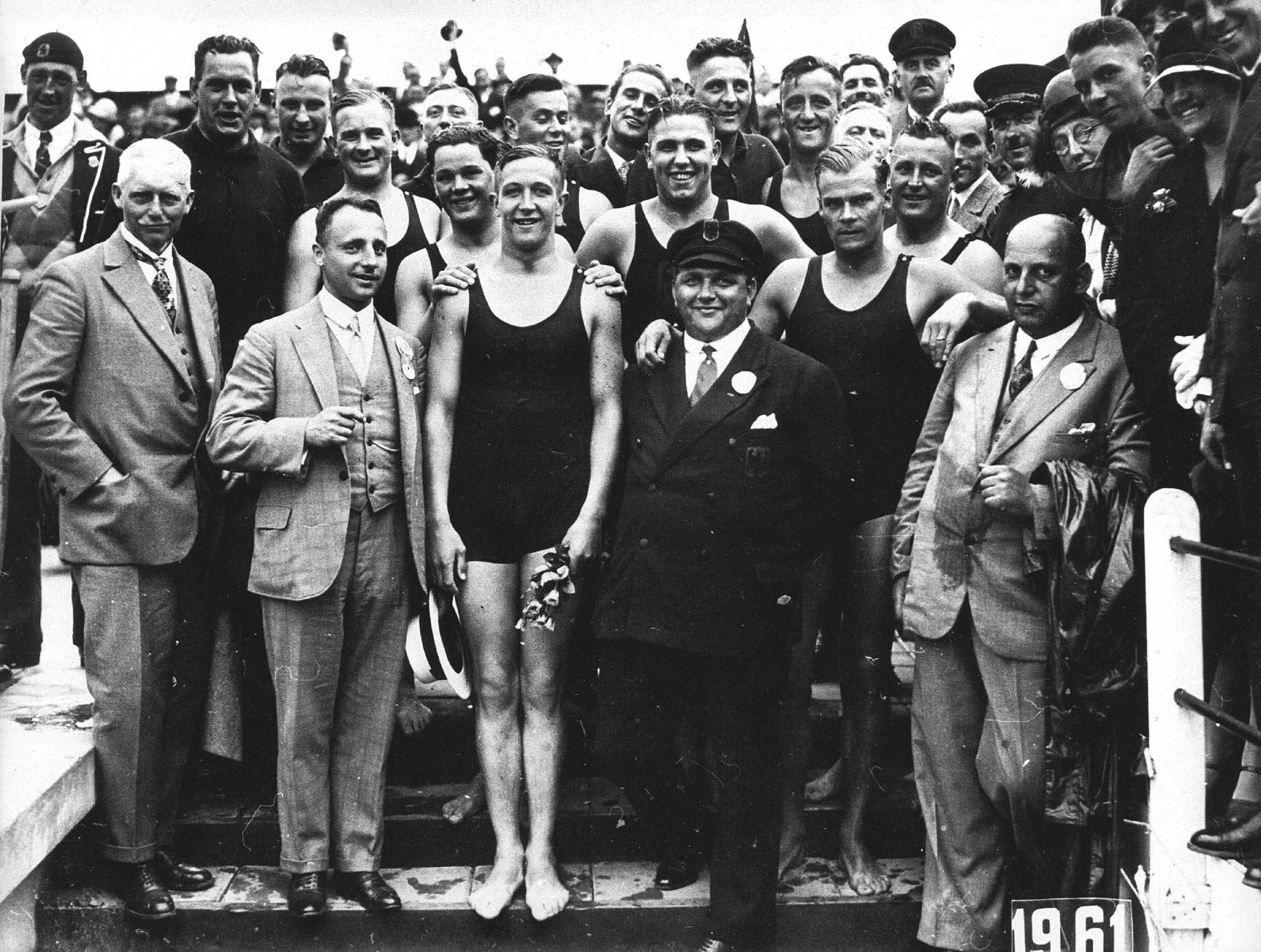
- winning German team
- Venue: Amsterdam
- Dates: 4–11 August
- Competitors: 112 from 14 nations

Medalists
1st place, gold medalist(s)		Germany; Germany
2nd place, silver medalist(s)		Hungary; Hungary
3rd place, bronze medalist(s)		France; France

The 1928 Summer Olympics Water Polo event was held between the fourth and eleventh of August. The final results of the tournament follow below.

== Competition format ==
The water polo tournament consisted primarily of a single-elimination bracket that determined the gold and silver medals. The bronze medal was supposed to be awarded through a modified Bergvall system tournament, in which the teams who lost to the top two nations (that is, Belgium and Great Britain—who had lost to Germany—and France, the United States, and Argentina—who had lost to Hungary) would conduct another single-elimination tournament for the third place. However, the tournament organizers did not understand the system. The Official Report lists three third-place matches, in which France beat Great Britain, the United States, and Argentina in succession. Sports-reference also lists two additional matches, between the United States and Malta and between the Netherlands and Belgium, also stating that "some of the matches played may have been friendlies or exhibitions." The France–Great Britain match is treated as the bronze medal game herein.

== Results ==
For the team rosters see: Water polo at the 1928 Summer Olympics – Men's team squads.

=== Bracket ===
Round of 16
Czechoslovakia	2
Great Britain	4
Switzerland	1
Netherlands	11
Belgium	11
Ireland	1
Hungary	14
Argentina	0
Malta	3
Luxembourg	1
Spain	0
France	4

Quarterfinals
Great Britain	5
Netherlands	3
Belgium	3
Germany	5
United States	0
Hungary	5
Malta	0
France	16

Semifinals
Great Britain	5
Germany	8
Hungary	5
France	3

Final
Germany	5
Hungary	2
Third place
Great Britain	1
France	8

=== Round of 16 ===
4 August 1928	OR p. 807	Czechoslovakia	2–4	Great Britain	Amsterdam; Referees: J.A. Ruddy (USA)
4 August 1928	OR p. 807	Scoring by half: 0–1, 2–3			Amsterdam; Referees: J.A. Ruddy (USA)

5 August 1928	OR p. 807	Switzerland	1–11	Netherlands	Amsterdam; Referees: L. Beleznay (HUN)
5 August 1928	OR p. 807	Scoring by half: 0–3, 1–8			Amsterdam; Referees: L. Beleznay (HUN)

5 August 1928	OR p. 808	Belgium	11–1	Ireland	Amsterdam; Referees: R. Morberger (AUT)
5 August 1928	OR p. 808	Scoring by half: 6–0, 5–1			Amsterdam; Referees: R. Morberger (AUT)

4 August 1928	OR p. 808	Hungary	14–0	Argentina	Amsterdam; Referees: C. Minnes Jr. (NED)
4 August 1928	OR p. 808	Scoring by half: 9–0, 5–0			Amsterdam; Referees: C. Minnes Jr. (NED)

5 August 1928	OR p. 809	Malta	3–1	Luxembourg	Amsterdam; Referees: M. Blitz (BEL)
5 August 1928	OR p. 809	Scoring by half: 1–1, 2–0			Amsterdam; Referees: M. Blitz (BEL)

4 August 1928	OR p. 810	Spain	0–4	France	Amsterdam; Referees: E. Speisegger (HUN)
4 August 1928	OR p. 810	Scoring by half: 0–2, 0–2			Amsterdam; Referees: E. Speisegger (HUN)

=== Quarterfinals ===
6 August 1928	OR p. 810	Great Britain	5–3 (OT)	Netherlands	Amsterdam; Referees: P. Beulque (FRA)
6 August 1928	OR p. 810	Scoring by half: 2–2, 1–1 OT: 2–0			Amsterdam; Referees: P. Beulque (FRA)

6 August 1928	OR p. 811	Belgium	3–5 (OT)	Germany	Amsterdam; Referees: J. Hodgson (GBR)
6 August 1928	OR p. 811	Scoring by half: 2–0, 1–3 OT: 0–2			Amsterdam; Referees: J. Hodgson (GBR)

6 August 1928	OR p. 811	United States	0–5	Hungary	Amsterdam; Referees: M. Nussbaum (GER)
6 August 1928	OR p. 811	Scoring by half: 0–2, 0–3			Amsterdam; Referees: M. Nussbaum (GER)

6 August 1928	OR p. 812	Malta	0–16	France	Amsterdam; Referees: A. Delahaye (BEL)
6 August 1928	OR p. 812	Scoring by half: 0–8, 0–8			Amsterdam; Referees: A. Delahaye (BEL)

=== Semifinals ===
7 August 1928	OR p. 812	Great Britain	5–8	Germany	Amsterdam; Referees: M. Blitz (BEL)
7 August 1928	OR p. 812	Scoring by half: 1–5, 4–3			Amsterdam; Referees: M. Blitz (BEL)

7 August 1928	OR p. 813	Hungary	5–3	France	Amsterdam; Referees: A. Delahaye (BEL)
7 August 1928	OR p. 813	Scoring by half: 1–1, 4–2			Amsterdam; Referees: A. Delahaye (BEL)

=== Bronze medal game ===
11 August 1928	OR p. 814	France	8–1	Great Britain	Amsterdam; Referees: A. Delahaye (BEL)
11 August 1928	OR p. 814	Scoring by half: 4–1, 4–0			Amsterdam; Referees: A. Delahaye (BEL)

=== Final ===
10 August 1928	OR p. 814	Germany	5–2 (OT)	Hungary	Amsterdam; Referees: M. Blitz (BEL)
10 August 1928	OR p. 814	Scoring by half: 0–2, 2–0 OT: 3–0			Amsterdam; Referees: M. Blitz (BEL)

== Participating nations ==
Each country was allowed to enter a team of 11 players and they all were eligible for participation.

A total of 109(*) water polo players from 14 nations competed at the Amsterdam Games:

- Argentina (7)
- Belgium (9)
- Czechoslovakia (7)
- France (9)
- Germany (8)
- Great Britain (9)
- Hungary (7)
- Ireland (7)
- Luxembourg (7)
- Malta (9)
- Netherlands (7)
- Spain (7)
- Switzerland (7)
- United States (9)

(*) NOTE: There are only players counted, which participated in one game at least.

== Final standings ==
Place	Nation
1	Germany
2	Hungary
3	France
4	Great Britain
5	Netherlands
6	Belgium
7	United States
8	Malta
9	Spain
10	Czechoslovakia
11	Luxembourg
12	Switzerland
13	Argentina
14	Ireland

== Sources ==
- PDF documents in the LA84 Foundation Digital Library:
  - Official Report of the 1928 Olympic Games (download, archive) (pp. 746–757, 797–807)
- Water polo on the Olympedia website
  - Water polo at the 1928 Summer Olympics (men's tournament)
- Water polo on the Sports Reference website
  - Water polo at the 1928 Summer Games (men's tournament) (archived)
