= Miklós Martin =

Hungarian water polo player (1931–2019)

Personal information
- Born: June 29, 1931 Budapest, Hungary
- Died: March 25, 2019 (aged 87) Pasadena, California, United States

Sport
- Sport: Water polo
Medal record
Representing Hungary
Olympic Games
Gold medal – first place	1952 Helsinki	Water polo
Gold medal – first place	1956 Melbourne	Water polo

Miklós (Nick) Martin (June 29, 1931 – March 25, 2019) was a Hungarian water polo player who competed in the 1952 and 1956 Summer Olympics. He was born in Budapest. He died in Pasadena, CA.

== Biography ==
Martin was part of the Hungarian team which won the gold medals in the 1952 and the 1956 tournaments. He played two matches, including the "Blood in the Water" semi-final match against the Soviet Union, and scored five goals. His name is often left out of the 1956 Olympics because he defected to the United States immediately after the games, along with numerous fellow Olympians, and the communist party of Hungary at the time omitted him. In all, the U.S. State Department granted asylum to 34 of the Hungarian athletes.

In June 2012, the magazine Sports Illustrated published a detailed account of the Hungarian defections that resulted from the Soviet Union's involvement in Hungary. The magazine itself played a key role in facilitating a secret plan to bring defecting Olympians to the United States. When the Hungarian delegation touched down in Darwin, Australia, Martin, one of the only athletes who read English, found a newspaper in the transit lounge and shared its reports. He became one of the primary spokespeople for the group.

As the best English speaker among the Hungarian Olympians who defected, Martin found himself quoted so often that he feared he would be punished as a ringleader if he were to return to Hungary. So, with an art history master's degree from the University of Budapest, he enrolled at the University of Southern California but played only one semester of water polo because he found the sport there "too Mickey Mouse." He was the first person to receive a water polo scholarship to USC. Instead he buckled down, earned his B.A. in French in three terms and, after earning a Ph.D. in Romance languages at Princeton on a Woodrow Wilson scholarship, became a professor. "The U.S. of that period was a land of endless opportunities," he says, "but my teaching career has been like an avalanche, straight down -- from Princeton to USC to Pasadena City College." Although retired from full-time teaching and over 80, he was still an adjunct professor of French at PCC and swam a mile each day. "PCC has a gorgeous pool," he says, "and I have the key."

In 2006, Colin K. Gray and Megan Raney directed "Freedom's Fury", a film about the 1956 Olympic water polo semi-final match between Hungary and the U.S.S.R. Nick Martin appears as himself.

In 2012, Martin participated in a video interview held at PCC's Aquatic Center as part of an in-depth feature by CNN/SI on the 1956 Hungarian Olympic team.

Martin retired as an associate professor in the French department of Pasadena City College. He was a full-time faculty member for 44 years, and spent 27 years as head coach of the Pasadena City College men's water polo team.

== See also ==
- Hungary men's Olympic water polo team records and statistics
- List of Olympic champions in men's water polo
- List of Olympic medalists in water polo (men)
- Blood in the Water match
