= Keserü =

Keserű and Keserü or Keșerü (Romanian spelling), English transliteration: Kesheru, are Hungarian-language surnames. They may refer to:

- Alajos Keserű, Hungarian water polo player
- Ferenc Keserű, Hungarian water polo player
- Ferenc Keserű (cyclist), Hungarian cyclist
- Etelka Keserű, Hungarian economist and politician

- Ilona Keserü, Hungarian artist
- Katalin Keserü, Hungarian artist and professor emeritus in arts

- Claudiu Keșerü, Romanian footballer
