= György =

- Gender: masculine
- Language: Hungarian
- Name day: April 24

Other gender
- Feminine: Georgina, Györgyi

Origin
- Language: Greek
- Meaning: farmer

Other names
- Nicknames: Gyuri, Gyurka
- Cognate: Georgios
- Anglicisation: George
- Related names: Györe, Györk, Györke

György (Hungarian pronunciation: [ˈɟørɟ]) is a Hungarian version of the name George. Some notable people with this given name:

- György Alexits (1899–1978), Hungarian mathematician
- György Almásy (1867–1933), Hungarian asiologist, traveler, zoologist and ethnographer
- György Apponyi (1808–1899), Hungarian politician
- Gordon Bajnai, full name György Gordon Bajnai (born 1968), Hungarian politician, Prime Minister of Hungary (2009–2010)
- György Bálint (originally surname Braun; 1919–2020), Hungarian horticulturist, Candidate of Agricultural Sciences, journalist, author and politician
- György Bárdy (1921–2013), Hungarian film and television actor
- Georg von Békésy, Hungarian: György Békésy (1899–1972), Hungarian biophysicist
- György Bessenyei (1747–1811), Hungarian playwright and poet
- György Bródy (1908–1967), Hungarian water polo player
- György Bulányi (1919–2010), Hungarian Piarist priest, teacher and leader
- Georg Carabelli, Hungarian: György Carabelli (1787–1842), Hungarian dentist
- György Csányi (athlete) (1922–1978), Hungarian athlete
- György Cserhalmi (born 1948), Hungarian actor
- György Cseszneky de Milvány et Csesznek, Hungarian aristocrat
- György Csordás (1928–2000), Hungarian freestyle swimmer
- György Czakó (1933–2023), Hungarian figure skater
- György Cziffra (1921–1994), Hungarian virtuoso pianist
- György Dózsa (c. 1470–1514), Székely man-at-arms from Transylvania
- György Enyedi (geographer) (1930–2012), Hungarian economist and geographer
- György Faludy (1910–2006), Hungarian-born poet, writer and translator
- György Fehér (1939–2002), Hungarian film director
- György Festetics (1815–1883), Hungarian politician
- György Fráter (1482–1551), Croatian nobleman, Pauline monk and Hungarian statesman
- György Garics (born 1984), Austrian-Hungarian footballer
- György Gedó (born 1949), Hungarian boxer
- György Gerendás (born 1954), Hungarian water polo player
- György Gurics (1929–2013), Hungarian wrestler
- György Gyimesi (born 1980), Slovak politician
- György Hajós (1912–1972), Hungarian mathematician
- György Hevesy (1885–1966), Hungarian radiochemist
- György Horkai (born 1954), Hungarian former water polo player
- György Káldy (1573–1634), Hungarian Jesuit and Bible translator
- György Károly (1953–2018), Hungarian poet and writer
- György Kárpáti (1935–2020), Hungarian former water polo player
- György Keleti (1946–2020), Hungarian politician, who served as Minister of Defence
- György Kenéz (born 1956), Hungarian former water polo player
- György Klapka (1820–1892), Hungarian general
- George Klein (biologist) (1925–2016), Hungarian–Swedish microbiologist and public intellectual
- György Kolonics (1972–2008), Hungarian sprint canoeist
- György Konrád (1933–2019), Hungarian novelist and essayist
- György Kulin (1905–1989), Hungarian astronomer
- György Kurtág (born 1926), Hungarian composer
- György Kutasi (1910–1977), Hungarian water polo player
- György Lahner (1795–1849), Hungarian general
- György Ligeti (1923–2006), Hungarian composer
- György Lukács (1885–1971), Hungarian Marxist philosopher
- George Pal, full name György Pál Marczincsak (1908–1980), Hungarian-American animator
- György Marx (1927–2002), Hungarian physicist, astrophysicist, science historian and professor
- György Matolcsy (born 1955), Hungarian politician and economist
- György Mezey (1941–2025), Hungarian football player and manager
- György Mitró (1930–2010), Hungarian swimmer
- György Moldova (1934–2022), Hungarian author
- George Andrew Olah, born György Oláh (1927–2017), Hungarian-American chemist
- György Orbán (born 1947), Romanian-born Hungarian composer
- György Orth (1901–1962), Hungarian footballer and manager
- György Pazdera, Hungarian bassist
- György Petri (1943–2000), Hungarian poet
- György Piller (1899–1960), Hungarian fencer
- György Pólya (1887–1985), Hungarian mathematician
- George I Rákóczi, Hungarian: I György Rákóczi (1593–1648), Prince of Transylvania from 1630 until 1648
- George II Rákóczi, Hungarian: II György Rákóczi (1621–1660), Hungarian nobleman, Prince of Transylvania from 1648 until 1660
- György Sándor (1912–2005), Hungarian pianist
- György Sándor (footballer) (born 1984), Hungarian footballer
- György Sárosi (1912–1993), Hungarian footballer
- György Sebők (1922–1999), Hungarian-born American pianist
- György Spiró (born 1946), Hungarian dramatist, novelist and essayist
- György Szabados (1939–2011), Hungarian jazz pianist
- György Szepesi (1922–2018), Hungarian radio personality and sports executive
- György Szondy (died 1552), 16th century Hungarian hero
- György Zala (sculptor) (1858–1937), Hungarian sculptor
- George Worth, born György Woittitz (1915–2006), Hungarian-born American Olympic medalist fencer
- George Soros, born György Schwartz (1930-), Hungarian-born American investor

== See also ==
- Gyorgyi (disambiguation)
