= István Szívós =

István Szívós may refer to:

- István Szívós (water polo, born 1920), Hungarian water polo player
- István Szívós (water polo, born 1948), Hungarian water polo player
- István Szívós (water polo, born 1981), Hungarian water polo player
