= Antal Bolvári =

Hungarian water polo player (1932–2019)

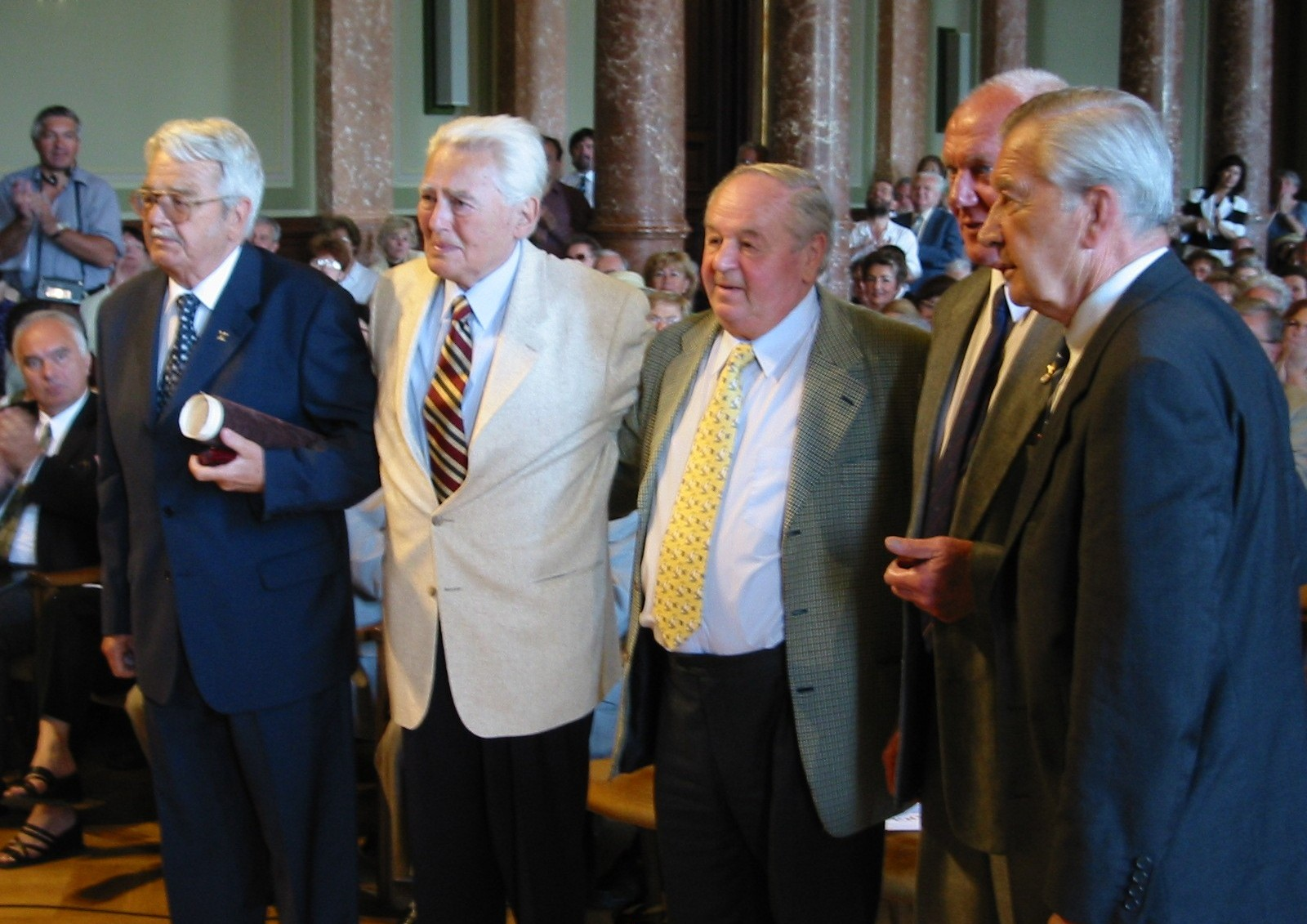
- Jeney László, Markovits Kálmán, Kárpáti György, Bolvári Antal, Gyarmati Dezső

Personal information
- Born: 6 May 1932 Kaposvár, Hungary
- Died: 8 January 2019 (aged 86) Budapest, Hungary
Medal record
Men's water polo
Representing Hungary
Olympic Games
Gold medal – first place	1952 Helsinki	Team competition
Gold medal – first place	1956 Melbourne	Team competition

Antal Bolvári (6 May 1932 – 8 January 2019) was a Hungarian water polo player who competed in the 1952 Summer Olympics and in the 1956 Summer Olympics.

== Early life ==
Born in Kaposvár, Bolvári was part of the Hungarian team that won the gold medal in the 1952 Olympics in Helsinki. He played in six matches and scored one goal.

Four years later, at the Melbourne Olympics, he was again a member of the Hungarian team that won the gold medal. He played in four matches and scored two goals, including one in the infamous Blood in the Water match against the USSR in the championship round, held a few weeks after the Soviets had crushed the 1956 Hungarian uprising.

Bolvári was one of several Hungarian athletes who defected to the West in the aftermath of the Melbourne games. He later returned to Hungary, where he continued to play and, later, coach at the club and national levels. He died in Budapest on 8 January 2019, as a result of a "a long, undisclosed illness", according to his family members.

== See also ==
- Hungary men's Olympic water polo team records and statistics
- List of Olympic champions in men's water polo
- List of Olympic medalists in water polo (men)
- Blood in the Water match
