= Hungary men's Olympic water polo team records and statistics =

This article lists various water polo records and statistics in relation to the Hungary men's national water polo team at the Summer Olympics.

The Hungary men's national water polo team has participated in 23 of 27 official men's water polo tournaments.

== Abbreviations ==
Apps	Appearances	Rk	Rank	Ref	Reference	Cap No.	Water polo cap number
Pos	Playing position	FP	Field player	GK	Goalkeeper	ISHOF	International Swimming Hall of Fame
L/R	Handedness	L	Left-handed	R	Right-handed	Oly debut	Olympic debut in water polo
(C)	Captain	p.	page	pp.	pages		

== Team statistics ==
=== Comprehensive results by tournament ===
Notes:

- Results of Olympic qualification tournaments are not included. Numbers refer to the final placing of each team at the respective Games.
- At the 1904 Summer Olympics, a water polo tournament was contested, but only American contestants participated. Currently the International Olympic Committee (IOC) and the International Swimming Federation (FINA) consider water polo event as part of unofficial program in 1904.
- Last updated: 5 May 2021.

Legend

- 1 – Champions
- 2 – Runners-up
- 3 – Third place
- 4 – Fourth place
- — – The nation did not participate in the Games
- Q – Qualified for forthcoming tournament

Men's team	00	04	08	12	20	24	28	32	36	48	52	56	60	64	68	72	76	80	84	88	92	96	00	04	08	12	16	20	Years
Hungary				5	—	5	2	1	1	2	1	1	3	1	3	2	1	3	—	5	6	4	1	1	1	5	5	3	23
Total teams	7		4	6	12	13	14	5	16	18	21	10	16	13	15	16	12	12	12	12	12	12	12	12	12	12	12	12	

=== Number of appearances ===
Last updated: 27 July 2021.

Men's team	Apps	Record streak	Active streak	Debut	Most recent	Best finish	Confederation
Hungary	23	13	9	1912	2020	Champions	Europe – LEN

=== Best finishes ===
Last updated: 27 July 2021.

Men's team	Best finish	Apps	Confederation
Hungary	Champions (1932, 1936, 1952, 1956, 1964, 1976, 2000, 2004, 2008)	23	Europe – LEN

=== Finishes in the top four ===
Last updated: 5 May 2021.

Men's team	Total	Champions	Runners-up	Third place	Fourth place	First	Last
Hungary	16	9 (1932, 1936, 1952, 1956, 1964, 1976, 2000, 2004, 2008)	3 (1928, 1948, 1972)	3 (1960, 1968, 1980)	1 (1996)	1928	2008

=== Medal table ===
Last updated: 5 May 2021.

Men's team	Gold	Silver	Bronze	Total
Hungary (HUN)	9	3	3	15

== Player statistics ==
=== Multiple appearances ===
The following table is pre-sorted by number of Olympic appearances (in descending order), year of the last Olympic appearance (in ascending order), year of the first Olympic appearance (in ascending order), date of birth (in ascending order), name of the player (in ascending order), respectively.

- Number of six-time Olympians: 0
- Number of five-time Olympians: 3
- Number of four-time Olympians: 12
- Last updated: 8 August 2021.

Male athletes who competed in water polo at four or more Olympics
Apps	Player	Birth	Pos	Water polo tournaments					Age of first/last	ISHOF member	Note	Ref
Apps	Player	Birth	Pos	1	2	3	4	5	Age of first/last	ISHOF member	Note	Ref
5	Dezső Gyarmati	1927	FP	1948	1952	1956	1960	1964	20/36	1976		
5	Tibor Benedek	1972	FP	1992	1996	2000	2004	2008	20/36	2016		
5	Tamás Kásás	1976	FP	1996	2000	2004	2008	2012	20/36	2016		
4	Márton Homonnai	1906	FP	1924	1928	1932	1936		18/30	1971		
4	László Jeney	1923	GK	1948	1952	1956	1960		25/37			
4	György Kárpáti	1935	FP	1952	1956	1960	1964		17/29	1982		
4	Mihály Mayer	1933	FP	1956	1960	1964	1968		22/34	1987		
4	András Bodnár	1942	FP	1960	1964	1968	1972		18/30	2017		
4	Endre Molnár	1945	GK	1968	1972	1976	1980		23/35			
4	István Szívós Jr.	1948	FP	1968	1972	1976	1980		20/32	1996		
4	Péter Biros	1976	FP	2000	2004	2008	2012		24/36	2016	Flag bearer for Hungary (2012)	
4	Gergely Kiss	1977	FP	2000	2004	2008	2012		22/34	2016		
4	Zoltán Szécsi	1977	GK	2000	2004	2008	2012		22/34	2016		
4	Norbert Hosnyánszky	1984	FP	2008	2012	2016	2020		24/37			
4	Dénes Varga	1987	FP	2008	2012	2016	2020		21/34			

=== Multiple medalists ===
The following table is pre-sorted by total number of Olympic medals (in descending order), number of Olympic gold medals (in descending order), number of Olympic silver medals (in descending order), year of receiving the last Olympic medal (in ascending order), year of receiving the first Olympic medal (in ascending order), name of the player (in ascending order), respectively.

- Number of five-time Olympic medalists: 1
- Number of four-time Olympic medalists: 6
- Number of three-time Olympic medalists: 19
- Last updated: 11 August 2021.

Male athletes who won three or more Olympic medals in water polo
Rk	Player	Birth	Height	Pos	Water polo tournaments					Period (age of first/last)	Medals				Ref
Rk	Player	Birth	Height	Pos	1	2	3	4	5	Period (age of first/last)	G	S	B	T	Ref
1	Dezső Gyarmati	1927	1.86 m (6 ft 1 in)	FP	1948	1952	1956	1960	1964	16 years (20/36)	3	1	1	5	
2	György Kárpáti	1935	1.67 m (5 ft 6 in)	FP	1952	1956	1960	1964		12 years (17/29)	3	0	1	4	
3	László Jeney	1923	1.81 m (5 ft 11 in)	GK	1948	1952	1956	1960		12 years (25/37)	2	1	1	4	
4	Mihály Mayer	1933	1.85 m (6 ft 1 in)	FP	1956	1960	1964	1968		12 years (22/34)	2	0	2	4	
5	András Bodnár	1942	1.80 m (5 ft 11 in)	FP	1960	1964	1968	1972		12 years (18/30)	1	1	2	4	
5	Endre Molnár	1945	1.85 m (6 ft 1 in)	GK	1968	1972	1976	1980		12 years (23/35)	1	1	2	4	
5	István Szívós Jr.	1948	2.02 m (6 ft 8 in)	FP	1968	1972	1976	1980		12 years (20/32)	1	1	2	4	
8	Tibor Benedek	1972	1.90 m (6 ft 3 in)	FP	1992	1996	2000	2004	2008	16 years (20/36)	3	0	0	3	
8	Péter Biros	1976	1.96 m (6 ft 5 in)	FP	2000	2004	2008	2012		12 years (24/36)	3	0	0	3	
8	Tamás Kásás	1976	2.00 m (6 ft 7 in)	FP	1996	2000	2004	2008	2012	16 years (20/36)	3	0	0	3	
8	Gergely Kiss	1977	1.98 m (6 ft 6 in)	FP	2000	2004	2008	2012		12 years (22/34)	3	0	0	3	
8	Tamás Molnár	1975	1.93 m (6 ft 4 in)	FP	2000	2004	2008			8 years (25/33)	3	0	0	3	
8	Zoltán Szécsi	1977	1.98 m (6 ft 6 in)	GK	2000	2004	2008	2012		12 years (22/34)	3	0	0	3	
14	Olivér Halassy	1909	1.55 m (5 ft 1 in)	FP	1928	1932	1936			8 years (18/27)	2	1	0	3	
14	Márton Homonnai	1906	1.85 m (6 ft 1 in)	FP	1924	1928	1932	1936		12 years (18/30)	2	1	0	3	
14	István Szívós Sr.	1920	1.85 m (6 ft 1 in)	FP	1948	1952	1956			8 years (27/36)	2	1	0	3	
17	Kálmán Markovits	1931	1.78 m (5 ft 10 in)	FP	1952	1956	1960			8 years (20/28)	2	0	1	3	
17	Ottó Boros	1929	1.86 m (6 ft 1 in)	GK	1956	1960	1964			8 years (27/35)	2	0	1	3	
17	Tivadar Kanizsa	1933	1.80 m (5 ft 11 in)	FP	1956	1960	1964			8 years (23/31)	2	0	1	3	
20	Dénes Pócsik	1940	1.95 m (6 ft 5 in)	FP	1964	1968	1972			8 years (24/32)	1	1	1	3	
20	Ferenc Konrád	1945	1.83 m (6 ft 0 in)	FP	1968	1972	1976			8 years (23/31)	1	1	1	3	
20	László Sárosi	1946	1.83 m (6 ft 0 in)	FP	1968	1972	1976			8 years (22/29)	1	1	1	3	
20	Tamás Faragó	1952	1.94 m (6 ft 4 in)	FP	1972	1976	1980			8 years (20/27)	1	1	1	3	
24	Zoltán Dömötör	1935	1.86 m (6 ft 1 in)	FP	1960	1964	1968			8 years (25/33)	1	0	2	3	
24	László Felkai	1941	1.80 m (5 ft 11 in)	FP	1960	1964	1968			8 years (19/27)	1	0	2	3	
24	János Konrád	1941	1.83 m (6 ft 0 in)	FP	1960	1964	1968			8 years (18/27)	1	0	2	3	
Rk	Player	Birth	Height	Pos	1	2	3	4	5	Period (age of first/last)	G	S	B	T	Ref
Rk	Player	Birth	Height	Pos	Water polo tournaments					Period (age of first/last)	Medals				Ref

=== Top goalscorers ===
The following table is pre-sorted by number of total goals (in descending order), year of the last Olympic appearance (in ascending order), year of the first Olympic appearance (in ascending order), name of the player (in ascending order), respectively.

- Number of goalscorers (50+ goals): 2
- Number of goalscorers (40–49 goals): 3
- Number of goalscorers (30–39 goals): 4
- Last updated: 1 April 2021.

Male players with 30 or more goals at the Olympics
Rk	Player	Birth	L/R	Total goals	Water polo tournaments (goals)					Age of first/last	ISHOF member	Note	Ref
Rk	Player	Birth	L/R	Total goals	1	2	3	4	5	Age of first/last	ISHOF member	Note	Ref
1	Tibor Benedek	1972	Left	65	1992 (22)	1996 (19)	2000 (9)	2004 (5)	2008 (10)	20/36	2016		
2	Tamás Kásás	1976	Right	56	1996 (13)	2000 (12)	2004 (14)	2008 (8)	2012 (9)	20/36	2016		
3	Gergely Kiss	1977	Left	46	2000 (14)	2004 (15)	2008 (9)	2012 (8)		23/34	2016		
4	Tamás Faragó	1952	Right	42	1972 (6)	1976 (22)	1980 (14)			20/27	1993		
5	Péter Biros	1976	Right	40	2000 (4)	2004 (7)	2008 (13)	2012 (16)		24/36	2016	Flag bearer for Hungary (2012)	
6	László Felkai	1941		34	1960 (4)	1964 (6)	1968 (24)			19/27			
7	Dénes Varga	1987	Right	33	2008 (10)	2012 (9)	2016 (14)			21/29			
8	János Németh	1906		32	1932 (12)	1936 (20)				26/30	1969		
8	Norbert Madaras	1979	Left	32	2004 (5)	2008 (9)	2012 (18)			24/32			
Rk	Player	Birth	L/R	Total goals	1	2	3	4	5	Age of first/last	ISHOF member	Note	Ref
Rk	Player	Birth	L/R	Total goals	Water polo tournaments (goals)					Age of first/last	ISHOF member	Note	Ref

Sources:

- Official Reports (PDF): 1912, 1924–1980, 1988–1996;
- Official Results Books (PDF): 2000 (pp. 45, 50, 55, 78, 81, 84, 87, 90), 2004 (pp. 207–208), 2008 (pp. 202–203), 2012 (pp. 481–482), 2016 (pp. 120–121).

=== Goalkeepers ===
The following table is pre-sorted by edition of the Olympics (in ascending order), cap number or name of the goalkeeper (in ascending order), respectively.

Last updated: 27 July 2021.

Abbreviation

- Eff % – Save efficiency (Saves / Shots)

Year	Cap No.	Goalkeeper	Birth	Age	ISHOF member	Note	Ref
1912		János Wenk	1894	18		The only goalkeeper in the squad	
1924		István Barta	1895	28		Starting goalkeeper	
1924		(Unknown)					
1928 (silver)		István Barta (2)	1895	32		Starting goalkeeper	
1928 (silver)		(Unknown)					
1932 (gold)		István Barta (3)	1895	37			
1932 (gold)		György Bródy	1908	24			
1936 (gold)		György Bródy (2)	1908	28			
1936 (gold)		György Kutasi	1910	25			
1948 (silver)		Endre Győrfi	1920	28			
1948 (silver)		László Jeney	1923	25			
1952 (gold)		Róbert Antal	1921	31			
1952 (gold)		László Jeney (2)	1923	29			
1956 (gold)		Ottó Boros	1929	27			
1956 (gold)		László Jeney (3)	1923	33			
1960 (bronze)		Ottó Boros (2)	1929	31			
1960 (bronze)		László Jeney (4)	1923	37			
1964 (gold)		Miklós Ambrus	1933	31			
1964 (gold)		Ottó Boros (3)	1929	35			
1968 (bronze)	1	Endre Molnár	1945	23			
1968 (bronze)	11	János Steinmetz	1947	21			
1972 (silver)	1	Endre Molnár (2)	1945	27			
1972 (silver)	11	Tibor Cservenyák	1948	24			
1976 (gold)	1	Endre Molnár (3)	1945	31			
1976 (gold)	11	Tibor Cservenyák (2)	1948	27			
1980 (bronze)	1	Endre Molnár (4)	1945	35			
1980 (bronze)	11	Károly Hauszler	1952	28			
1988	1	Péter Kuna	1965	23			
1988	12	Zoltán Kósz	1967	20			
1992	1	Gábor Nemes	1964	27			
1992	7	Péter Kuna (2)	1965	27			
Year	Cap No.	Goalkeeper	Birth	Age	ISHOF member	Note	Ref

Year	Cap No.	Goalkeeper	Birth	Age	Saves	Shots	Eff %	ISHOF member	Note	Ref
1996	1	Zoltán Kósz (2)	1967	28	57	121	47.1%		Starting goalkeeper	
1996	12	Péter Kuna (3)	1965	31	8	14	57.1%			
2000 (gold)	1	Zoltán Kósz (3)	1967	32	58	112	51.8%		Starting goalkeeper	
2000 (gold)	10	Zoltán Szécsi	1977	22	6	9	66.7%	2016		
2004 (gold)	1	Zoltán Szécsi (2)	1977	26	40	75	53.3%	2016	Starting goalkeeper	
2004 (gold)	10	István Gergely (2)	1976	28	8	12	66.7%			
2008 (gold)	1	Zoltán Szécsi (3)	1977	30	42	83	50.6%	2016	Starting goalkeeper	
2008 (gold)	13	István Gergely (3)	1976	32	24	38	63.2%			
2012	1	Zoltán Szécsi (4)	1977	34	44	94	46.8%	2016		
2012	13	Viktor Nagy	1984	28	38	68	55.9%			
2016	1	Viktor Nagy (2)	1984	32	67	118	56.8%		Starting goalkeeper	
2016	13	Attila Decker	1987	29	14	29	48.3%			
2020	1	Viktor Nagy (3)	1984	37						
2020	13	Soma Vogel	1997	24						
Year	Cap No.	Goalkeeper	Birth	Age	Saves	Shots	Eff %	ISHOF member	Note	Ref

Sources:

- Official Reports (PDF): 1996 (pp. 57–61, 69, 71, 73);
- Official Results Books (PDF): 2000 (pp. 45, 50, 55, 78, 81, 84, 87, 90), 2004 (pp. 207–208), 2008 (pp. 202–203), 2012 (pp. 481–482), 2016 (pp. 120–121).

=== Top sprinters ===
The following table is pre-sorted by number of total sprints won (in descending order), year of the last Olympic appearance (in ascending order), year of the first Olympic appearance (in ascending order), name of the sprinter (in ascending order), respectively.

* Number of sprinters (30+ sprints won, since 2000): 1

- Number of sprinters (20–29 sprints won, since 2000): 0
- Number of sprinters (10–19 sprints won, since 2000): 1
- Number of sprinters (5–9 sprints won, since 2000): 4
- Last updated: 15 May 2021.

Abbreviation

- Eff % – Efficiency (Sprints won / Sprints contested)

Male players with 5 or more sprints won at the Olympics (statistics since 2000)
Rk	Sprinter	Birth	Total sprints won	Total sprints contested	Eff %	Water polo tournaments (sprints won / contested)					Age of first/last	ISHOF member	Note	Ref
Rk	Sprinter	Birth	Total sprints won	Total sprints contested	Eff %	1	2	3	4	5	Age of first/last	ISHOF member	Note	Ref
1	Tamás Kásás	1976	39	59	66.1%	1996 (N/A)	2000 (15/29)	2004 (7/9)	2008 (10/12)	2012 (7/9)	20/36	2016		
2	Balázs Erdélyi	1990	12	17	70.6%	2016 (12/17)					26/26			
3	Péter Biros	1976	9	20	45.0%	2000 (2/2)	2004 (4/10)	2008 (3/5)	2012 (0/3)		24/36	2016	Flag bearer for Hungary (2012)	
4	Norbert Madaras	1979	8	24	33.3%	2004 (3/9)	2008 (3/6)	2012 (2/9)			24/32			
5	Dénes Varga	1987	7	14	50.0%	2008 (1/4)	2012 (5/9)	2016 (1/1)			21/29			
5	Krisztián Manhercz	1997	7	10	70.0%	2016 (7/10)					19/19			

- Official Results Books (PDF): 2000 (pp. 45, 50, 55, 78, 81, 84, 87, 90), 2004 (pp. 207–208), 2008 (pp. 202–203), 2012 (pp. 481–482), 2016 (pp. 120–121).

== Coach statistics ==
=== Most successful coaches ===
The following table is pre-sorted by total number of Olympic medals (in descending order), number of Olympic gold medals (in descending order), number of Olympic silver medals (in descending order), year of winning the last Olympic medal (in ascending order), year of winning the first Olympic medal (in ascending order), name of the coach (in ascending order), respectively. Last updated: 5 May 2021.

There are two coaches who led Hungary men's national water polo team to win three or more Olympic medals.

Dénes Kemény of Hungary is one of the only two coaches who led men's national water polo team(s) to win three Olympic gold medals. Under his leadership, the Hungary men's Olympic team won three gold in a row between 2000 and 2008, becoming the second water polo team to have an Olympic winning streak.

Dezső Gyarmati coached the Hungary men's national team to three consecutive Olympic medals, a silver in 1972, a gold in 1976, and a bronze in 1980.

Head coaches who led men's national teams to win three or more Olympic medals
Rk	Head coach	Nationality	Birth	Age	Men's team	Tournaments (finish)					Period	Medals				Ref
Rk	Head coach	Nationality	Birth	Age	Men's team	1	2	3	4	5	Period	G	S	B	T	Ref
1	Dénes Kemény	Hungary	1954	46–58	Hungary	2000 (1st)	2004 (1st)	2008 (1st)	2012 (5th)		12 years	3	0	0	3	
2	Dezső Gyarmati	Hungary	1927	44–52	Hungary	1972 (2nd)	1976 (1st)	1980 (3rd)			8 years	1	1	1	3	

=== Medals as coach and player ===
The following table is pre-sorted by total number of Olympic medals (in descending order), number of Olympic gold medals (in descending order), number of Olympic silver medals (in descending order), year of winning the last Olympic medal (in ascending order), year of winning the first Olympic medal (in ascending order), name of the person (in ascending order), respectively. Last updated: 5 May 2021.

Dezső Gyarmati of Hungary won five Olympic medals in a row between 1948 and 1964. He coached the Hungary men's national team to three consecutive Olympic medals, including a gold in 1976, making him the only man to win Olympic gold in water polo as player and head coach in the last 100 years.

With the Hungary men's national water polo team, István Görgényi won a silver medal at the 1972 Summer Olympics in Munich. He was appointed head coach of the Australia women's national team in 1998. At the 2000 Sydney Olympics, he led the team to win the inaugural women's water polo gold medal.

Legend

- Year^{*} – As host team

Rk	Person	Birth	Height	Player				Head coach			Total medals				Ref
Rk	Person	Birth	Height	Age	Men's team	Pos	Medal	Age	Men's team	Medal	G	S	B	T	Ref
1	Dezső Gyarmati	1927	1.86 m (6 ft 1 in)	20–36	Hungary	FP	1948 (silver) , 1952 (gold) , 1956 (gold) , 1960 (bronze) , 1964 (gold)	44–52	Hungary	1972 (silver) , 1976 (gold) , 1980 (bronze)	4	2	2	8	
2	Dezső Lemhényi	1917		30–34	Hungary	FP	1948 (silver) , 1952 (gold)	42	Hungary	1960 (bronze)	1	1	1	3	

Rk	Person	Birth	Height	Player				Head coach			Total medals				Ref
Rk	Person	Birth	Height	Age	Men's team	Pos	Medal	Age	Women's team	Medal	G	S	B	T	Ref
1	István Görgényi	1946	1.87 m (6 ft 2 in)	25	Hungary	FP	1972 (silver)	53	Australia	2000^{*} (gold)	1	1	0	2	

== Olympic champions ==
=== 1932 Summer Olympics ===
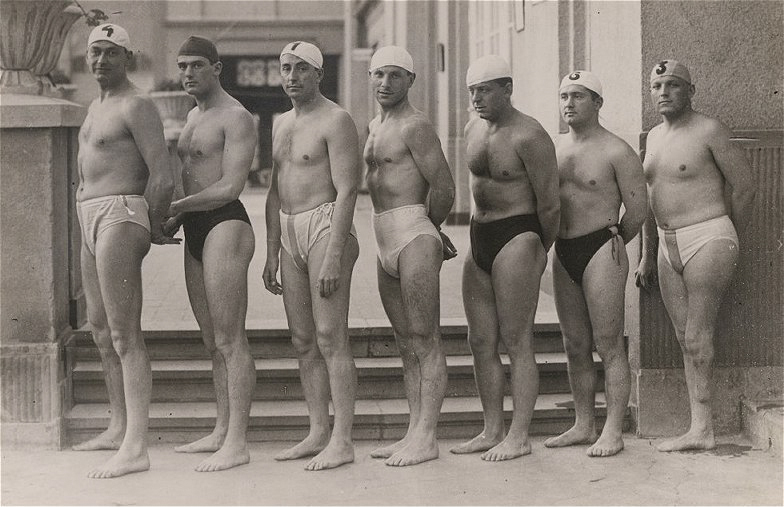
The 1932 Hungary men's Olympic water polo team. From left to right: Sándor Ivády, György Bródy, József Vértesy, János Németh, Márton Homonnai, Alajos Keserű, and Olivér Halassy.

- Edition of men's tournament: 8th
- Host city: Los Angeles, United States
- Number of participating teams: 5
- Competition format: Round-robin tournament
- Champion: Hungary (1st title)

Match	Round	Date	Opponent	Result	Goals for	Goals against	Goal diff.
Match 1/4	Round-robin group	6 August 1932	Germany	Won	6	2	4
Match 2/4	Round-robin group	8 August 1932	Japan	Won	17	0	17
Match 3/4	Round-robin group	11 August 1932	United States	Won	7	0	7
Match 4/4	Round-robin group	Scheduled	Brazil	Brazil was disqualified. (Note: At the 1932 Olympics, Brazil was disqualified after their players attacked the Hungarian referee at the end of their match against Germany. Their two matches were annulled. Therefore, Hungary and Japan won their games scheduled with Brazil, by forfeit. For more details, please see the Official Report of the 1932 Olympic Games (pp. 650–651), and here.)			
Total	Matches played: 3 • Wins: 3 • Ties: 0 • Defeats: 0 • Win %: 100%				30	2	28

Source: Official Reports (PDF): 1932 (pp. 646, 649, 650).

- Head coach: (Hungary)

Roster
#	Player	Pos	Height	Weight	Date of birth	Age of winning gold	Oly debut	ISHOF member
P1	István Barta	GK			13 August 1895	37 years, 0 days	No	
P2	György Bródy	GK	1.85 m (6 ft 1 in)		21 July 1908	24 years, 23 days	Yes	
P3	Olivér Halassy	FP			31 July 1909	23 years, 13 days	No	1978
P4	Márton Homonnai	FP			5 February 1906	26 years, 190 days	No	1971
P5	Sándor Ivády	FP			1 May 1903	29 years, 104 days	No	
P6	Alajos Keserű	FP			8 March 1905	27 years, 158 days	No	
P7	Ferenc Keserű	FP			27 August 1903	28 years, 352 days	No	
P8	János Németh	FP			12 June 1906	26 years, 62 days	Yes	1969
P9	Miklós Sárkány	FP			15 August 1908	23 years, 364 days	Yes	
P10	József Vértesy	FP			19 February 1901	31 years, 176 days	No	
Average					27 October 1904	27 years, 291 days		

Note: Alajos Keserű and Ferenc Keserű are brothers.
Sources:

- Official Reports (PDF): 1932 (pp. 646, 649, 650);
- Olympedia: 1932 (men's tournament);
- Sports Reference: 1932 (men's tournament);
- ISHOF.

=== 1936 Summer Olympics ===
- Edition of men's tournament: 9th
- Host city: Berlin, Germany
- Number of participating teams: 16
- Competition format: Round-robin pools advanced teams to the round-robin semi-final pool; round-robin semi-final pools advanced teams to the round-robin final pool
- Champion: Hungary (2nd title; 1st place in preliminary II group; 1st place in semi-final I group; 1st place in final group)

Match	Round	Date	Opponent	Result	Goals for	Goals against	Goal diff.
Match 1/7	Preliminary round – Group II	8 August 1936	Yugoslavia	Won	4	1	3
Match 2/7	Preliminary round – Group II	9 August 1936	Malta	Won	12	0	12
Match 3/7	Preliminary round – Group II	10 August 1936	Great Britain	Won	10	1	9
Match 4/7	Semi-final round – Group I	11 August 1936	Belgium	Won	3	0	3
Match 5/7	Semi-final round – Group I	12 August 1936	Netherlands	Won	8	0	8
Match 6/7	Final round – Group	14 August 1936	Germany	Drawn	2	2	0
Match 7/7	Final round – Group	15 August 1936	France	Won	5	0	5
Total	Matches played: 7 • Wins: 6 • Ties: 1 • Defeats: 0 • Win %: 85.7%				44	4	40

Source: Official Reports (PDF): 1936 (pp. 347, 349, 355).

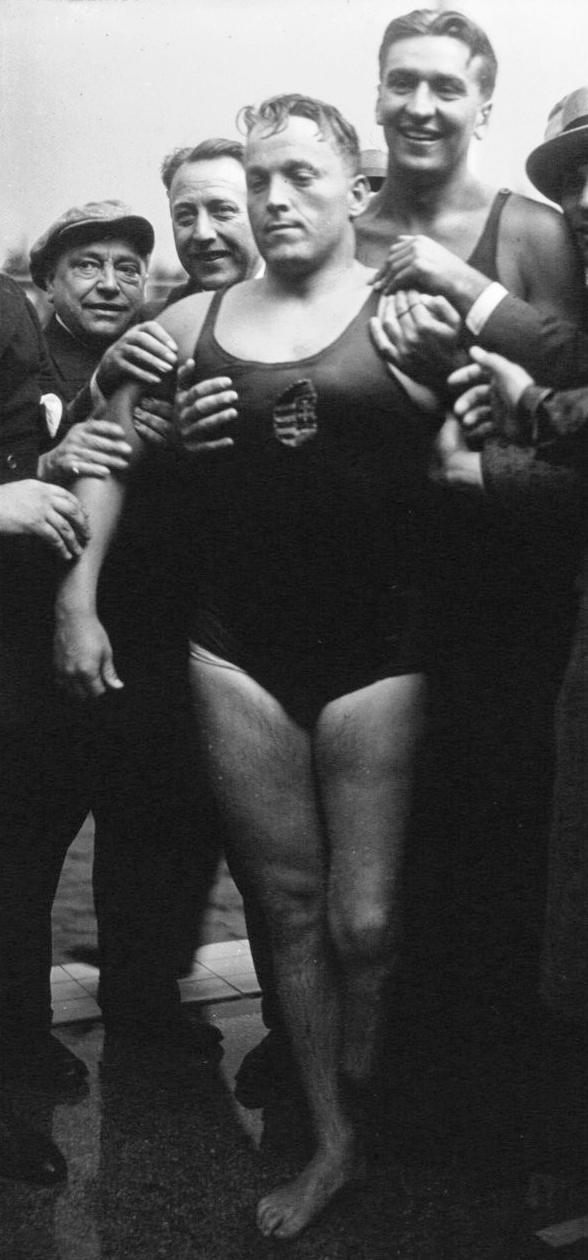
Despite his disability of losing the left leg below the knee, Olivér Halassy won three consecutive Olympic medals (two gold and one silver) in water polo between 1928 and 1936.

- Head coach: (Hungary)

Roster
#	Player	Pos	Height	Weight	Date of birth	Age of winning gold	Oly debut	ISHOF member
P1	Mihály Bozsi	FP			2 March 1911	25 years, 166 days	Yes	
P2	Jenő Brandi	FP			23 May 1913	23 years, 84 days	Yes	
P3	György Bródy	GK	1.85 m (6 ft 1 in)		21 July 1908	28 years, 25 days	No	
P4	Olivér Halassy	FP			31 July 1909	27 years, 15 days	No	1978
P5	Kálmán Hazai	FP			17 July 1913	23 years, 29 days	Yes	
P6	Márton Homonnai	FP			5 February 1906	30 years, 192 days	No	1971
P7	György Kutasi	GK			16 September 1910	25 years, 334 days	Yes	
P8	István Molnár	FP			5 January 1913	23 years, 223 days	Yes	
P9	János Németh	FP			12 June 1906	30 years, 64 days	No	1969
P10	Miklós Sárkány	FP			15 August 1908	28 years, 0 days	No	
P11	Sándor Tarics	FP			23 September 1913	22 years, 327 days	Yes	
Average					10 June 1910	26 years, 66 days		

Sources:

- Official Reports (PDF): 1936 (pp. 347, 349, 355);
- Olympedia: 1936 (men's tournament);
- Sports Reference: 1936 (men's tournament);
- ISHOF.

=== 1952 Summer Olympics ===
- Edition of men's tournament: 11th
- Host city: Helsinki, Finland
- Number of participating teams: 21
- Competition format: Single-elimination tournament qualifying; round-robin pools advanced teams to the round-robin semi-final pool; round-robin semi-final pools advanced teams to the round-robin final pool
- Champion: Hungary (3rd title; 1st place in preliminary B group; 1st place in semi-final F group; 1st place in final group)

Match	Round	Date	Opponent	Result	Goals for	Goals against	Goal diff.
Match 1/8	Eliminating round – First round	25 July 1952	Mexico	Won	13	4	9
Match 2/8	Preliminary round – Group B	26 July 1952	Egypt	Won	9	0	9
Match 3/8	Preliminary round – Group B	27 July 1952	Soviet Union	Won	5	3	2
Match 4/8	Preliminary round – Group B	28 July 1952	Germany	Won	9	1	8
Match 5/8	Semi-final round – Group F	30 July 1952	Netherlands	Drawn	4	4	0
Match 6/8	Semi-final round – Group F	31 July 1952	Yugoslavia	Drawn	2	2	0
Match 7/8	Final round – Group	1 August 1952	Italy	Won	7	2	5
Match 8/8	Final round – Group	2 August 1952	United States	Won	4	0	4
Total	Matches played: 8 • Wins: 6 • Ties: 2 • Defeats: 0 • Win %: 75.0%				53	16	37

Source: Official Reports (PDF): 1952 (pp. 602, 603, 606, 607, 608).

- Head coach: (Hungary) Béla Rajki (1st title as head coach)

Roster
#	Player	Pos	Height	Weight	Date of birth	Age of winning gold	Oly debut	ISHOF member
P1	Róbert Antal	GK			21 July 1921	31 years, 12 days	Yes	
P2	Antal Bolvári	FP			6 May 1932	20 years, 88 days	Yes	
P3	Dezső Fábián	FP			17 December 1918	33 years, 229 days	No	
P4	Dezső Gyarmati	FP	1.86 m (6 ft 1 in)	83 kg (183 lb)	23 October 1927	24 years, 284 days	No	1976
P5	István Hasznos	FP			8 December 1924	27 years, 238 days	Yes	
P6	László Jeney	GK	1.81 m (5 ft 11 in)	77 kg (170 lb)	30 May 1923	29 years, 64 days	No	
P7	György Kárpáti	FP	1.67 m (5 ft 6 in)	71 kg (157 lb)	23 June 1935	17 years, 40 days	Yes	1982
P8	Dezső Lemhényi	FP		71 kg (157 lb)	9 December 1917	34 years, 237 days	No	1998
P9	Kálmán Markovits	FP	1.78 m (5 ft 10 in)	71 kg (157 lb)	26 August 1931	20 years, 342 days	Yes	1994
P10	Miklós Martin	FP			29 June 1931	21 years, 34 days	Yes	
P11	Károly Szittya	FP			18 June 1918	34 years, 45 days	No	
P12	István Szívós Sr.	FP	1.85 m (6 ft 1 in)		20 August 1920	31 years, 348 days	No	1997
P13	György Vizvári	FP			18 December 1928	23 years, 228 days	Yes	
Average					31 August 1925	26 years, 337 days		
Coach	Béla Rajki				2 February 1909	43 years, 182 days		1996

Sources:

- Official Reports (PDF): 1952 (pp. 602, 603, 606, 607, 608);
- Olympedia: 1952 (men's tournament);
- Sports Reference: 1952 (men's tournament);
- ISHOF.

=== 1956 Summer Olympics ===
- Edition of men's tournament: 12th
- Host city: Melbourne, Australia
- Number of participating teams: 10
- Competition format: Round-robin pools advanced teams to the round-robin final pool
- Champion: Hungary (4th title; 1st place in preliminary B group; 1st place in final group)

Match	Round	Date	Opponent	Result	Goals for	Goals against	Goal diff.	Note
Match 1/6	Preliminary round – Group B	29 November 1956	Great Britain	Won	6	1	5	
Match 2/6	Preliminary round – Group B	30 November 1956	United States	Won	6	2	4	
Match 3/6	Final round – Group	3 December 1956	Italy	Won	4	0	4	
Match 4/6	Final round – Group	5 December 1956	United Team of Germany	Won	4	0	4	
Match 5/6	Final round – Group	6 December 1956	Soviet Union	Won	4	0	4	Blood in the Water match
Match 6/6	Final round – Group	7 December 1956	Yugoslavia	Won	2	1	0	
Total	Matches played: 6 • Wins: 6 • Ties: 0 • Defeats: 0 • Win %: 100%				26	4	22	Note

Source: Official Reports (PDF): 1956 (pp. 625, 626).

- Head coach: (Hungary) Béla Rajki (2nd title as head coach)

Roster
#	Player	Pos	Height	Weight	Date of birth	Age of winning gold	Oly debut	ISHOF member
P1	Antal Bolvári	FP			6 May 1932	24 years, 215 days	No	
P2	Ottó Boros	GK	1.86 m (6 ft 1 in)	95 kg (209 lb)	5 August 1929	27 years, 124 days	Yes	
P3	Dezső Gyarmati (C)	FP	1.86 m (6 ft 1 in)	83 kg (183 lb)	23 October 1927	29 years, 45 days	No	1976
P4	István Hevesi	FP	1.85 m (6 ft 1 in)	86 kg (190 lb)	2 April 1931	25 years, 249 days	Yes	
P5	László Jeney	GK	1.81 m (5 ft 11 in)	77 kg (170 lb)	30 May 1923	33 years, 191 days	No	
P6	Tivadar Kanizsa	FP	1.80 m (5 ft 11 in)	78 kg (172 lb)	4 April 1933	23 years, 247 days	Yes	
P7	György Kárpáti	FP	1.67 m (5 ft 6 in)	71 kg (157 lb)	23 June 1935	21 years, 167 days	No	1982
P8	Kálmán Markovits	FP	1.78 m (5 ft 10 in)	71 kg (157 lb)	26 August 1931	25 years, 103 days	No	1994
P9	Miklós Martin	FP			29 June 1931	25 years, 161 days	No	
P10	Mihály Mayer	FP	1.85 m (6 ft 1 in)	81 kg (179 lb)	27 December 1933	22 years, 346 days	Yes	1987
P11	István Szívós Sr.	FP	1.85 m (6 ft 1 in)		20 August 1920	36 years, 109 days	No	1997
P12	Ervin Zádor	FP			7 June 1935	21 years, 183 days	Yes	
Average			1.81 m (5 ft 11 in) (Note: Average height of 9 players.)	80 kg (176 lb) (Note: Average weight of 8 players.)	12 July 1930	26 years, 148 days		
Coach	Béla Rajki				2 February 1909	47 years, 309 days		1996

Sources:

- Official Reports (PDF): 1956 (pp. 625, 626);
- Olympedia: 1956 (men's tournament);
- Sports Reference: 1956 (men's tournament);
- ISHOF.

=== 1964 Summer Olympics ===
- Edition of men's tournament: 14th
- Host city: Tokyo, Japan
- Number of participating teams: 13
- Competition format: Round-robin pools advanced teams to the round-robin semi-final pool; round-robin semi-final pools advanced teams to the round-robin final pool
- Champion: Hungary (5th title; 1st place in preliminary D group; 2nd place in semi-final B group; 1st place in final group)

Match	Round	Date	Opponent	Result	Goals for	Goals against	Goal diff.
Match 1/6	Preliminary round – Group D	11 October 1964	Egypt	Won	11	1	10
Match 2/6	Preliminary round – Group D	12 October 1964	Belgium	Won	5	0	5
Match 3/6	Semi-final round – Group B	14 October 1964	Netherlands	Won	6	5	1
Match 4/6	Semi-final round – Group B	15 October 1964	Yugoslavia	Drawn	4	4	0
Match 5/6	Final round – Group	17 October 1964	Italy	Won	3	1	2
Match 6/6	Final round – Group	18 October 1964	Soviet Union	Won	5	2	3
Total	Matches played: 6 • Wins: 5 • Ties: 1 • Defeats: 0 • Win %: 83.3%				34	13	21

Source: Official Reports (PDF): 1964 (pp. 685, 687, 691, 694, 695, 698).

- Head coach: (Hungary) Károly Laky (1st title as head coach)

Roster
#	Player	Pos	Height	Weight	Date of birth	Age of winning gold	Oly debut	Goals	ISHOF member
P1	Miklós Ambrus	GK	1.85 m (6 ft 1 in)	90 kg (198 lb)	31 May 1933	31 years, 140 days	Yes	0	
P2	András Bodnár	FP	1.80 m (5 ft 11 in)	78 kg (172 lb)	9 April 1942	22 years, 192 days	No	2	2017
P3	Ottó Boros	GK	1.86 m (6 ft 1 in)	95 kg (209 lb)	5 August 1929	35 years, 74 days	No	0	
P4	Zoltán Dömötör	FP	1.86 m (6 ft 1 in)	84 kg (185 lb)	21 August 1935	29 years, 58 days	No	7	
P5	László Felkai	FP	1.80 m (5 ft 11 in)	76 kg (168 lb)	1 March 1941	23 years, 231 days	No	6	
P6	Dezső Gyarmati (C)	FP	1.86 m (6 ft 1 in)	83 kg (183 lb)	23 October 1927	36 years, 361 days	No	2	1976
P7	Tivadar Kanizsa	FP	1.80 m (5 ft 11 in)	78 kg (172 lb)	4 April 1933	31 years, 197 days	No	1	
P8	György Kárpáti	FP	1.67 m (5 ft 6 in)	71 kg (157 lb)	23 June 1935	29 years, 117 days	No	4	1982
P9	János Konrád	FP	1.83 m (6 ft 0 in)	83 kg (183 lb)	27 August 1941	23 years, 52 days	No	2	
P10	Mihály Mayer	FP	1.85 m (6 ft 1 in)	81 kg (179 lb)	27 December 1933	30 years, 296 days	No	0	1987
P11	Dénes Pócsik	FP	1.95 m (6 ft 5 in)	93 kg (205 lb)	9 March 1940	24 years, 223 days	Yes	2	
P12	Péter Rusorán	FP	1.70 m (5 ft 7 in)	69 kg (152 lb)	11 April 1940	24 years, 190 days	No	8	
Average			1.82 m (6 ft 0 in)	82 kg (181 lb)	24 March 1936	28 years, 208 days	Total	34	
Coach	Károly Laky								

Sources:

- Official Reports (PDF): 1964 (pp. 685, 687, 691, 694, 695, 698);
- Olympedia: 1964 (men's tournament);
- Sports Reference: 1964 (men's tournament);
- ISHOF.

=== 1976 Summer Olympics ===
- Edition of men's tournament: 17th
- Host city: Montreal, Canada
- Number of participating teams: 12
- Competition format: Round-robin pools advanced teams to the round-robin final pool
- Champion: Hungary (6th title; 1st place in preliminary C group; 1st place in final E group)

Match	Round	Date	Opponent	Result	Goals for	Goals against	Goal diff.
Match 1/8	Preliminary round – Group C	18 July 1976	Australia	Won	7	6	1
Match 2/8	Preliminary round – Group C	19 July 1976	Canada	Won	4	2	2
Match 3/8	Preliminary round – Group C	20 July 1976	West Germany	Won	4	0	4
Match 4/8	Final round – Group E	22 July 1976	Italy	Won	6	5	1
Match 5/8	Final round – Group E	23 July 1976	West Germany	Won	5	3	2
Match 6/8	Final round – Group E	24 July 1976	Netherlands	Won	5	3	2
Match 7/8	Final round – Group E	26 July 1976	Romania	Won	9	8	1
Match 8/8	Final round – Group E	27 July 1976	Yugoslavia	Drawn	5	5	0
Total	Matches played: 8 • Wins: 7 • Ties: 1 • Defeats: 0 • Win %: 87.5%				45	32	13

Source: Official Reports (PDF): 1976 (pp. 487, 489, 491, 492).

- Head coach: (Hungary) Dezső Gyarmati (1st title as head coach)

Roster
Cap No.	Player	Pos	Height	Weight	Date of birth	Age of winning gold	Oly debut	Goals	ISHOF member
1	Endre Molnár	GK	1.85 m (6 ft 1 in)	92 kg (203 lb)	23 July 1945	31 years, 4 days	No	0	
2	István Szívós Jr.	FP	2.02 m (6 ft 8 in)	106 kg (234 lb)	24 April 1948	28 years, 94 days	No	4	1996
3	Tamás Faragó	FP	1.94 m (6 ft 4 in)	95 kg (209 lb)	5 August 1952	23 years, 357 days	No	22	1993
4	László Sárosi	FP	1.83 m (6 ft 0 in)	83 kg (183 lb)	12 October 1946	29 years, 289 days	No	3	
5	György Horkai	FP	1.78 m (5 ft 10 in)	74 kg (163 lb)	1 July 1954	22 years, 26 days	Yes	10	
6	Gábor Csapó	FP	1.98 m (6 ft 6 in)	103 kg (227 lb)	20 September 1950	25 years, 311 days	Yes	4	
7	Attila Sudár	FP	1.87 m (6 ft 2 in)	81 kg (179 lb)	11 April 1954	22 years, 107 days	Yes	0	
8	György Kenéz	FP	1.80 m (5 ft 11 in)	78 kg (172 lb)	23 June 1956	20 years, 34 days	Yes	0	
9	György Gerendás	FP	1.86 m (6 ft 1 in)	80 kg (176 lb)	23 February 1954	22 years, 155 days	Yes	1	
10	Ferenc Konrád	FP	1.83 m (6 ft 0 in)	88 kg (194 lb)	17 April 1945	31 years, 101 days	No	1	
11	Tibor Cservenyák	GK	1.85 m (6 ft 1 in)	91 kg (201 lb)	8 August 1948	27 years, 354 days	No	0	
Average			1.87 m (6 ft 2 in)	88 kg (194 lb)	29 August 1950	25 years, 333 days	Total	45	
Coach	Dezső Gyarmati		1.86 m (6 ft 1 in)		23 October 1927	48 years, 278 days			1976

Sources:

- Official Reports (PDF): 1976 (pp. 487, 489, 491, 492);
- Olympedia: 1976 (men's tournament);
- Sports Reference: 1976 (men's tournament);
- ISHOF.

=== 2000 Summer Olympics ===
- Edition of men's tournament: 23rd
- Host city: Sydney, Australia
- Number of participating teams: 12
- Competition format: Round-robin pools advanced teams to classification matches
- Champion: Hungary (7th title; 3rd place in preliminary B group)

Results
Match	Round	Date	Cap color	Opponent	Result	Goals for	Goals against	Goal diff.
Match 1/8	Preliminary round – Group B	23 September 2000	Blue	Greece	Won	7	4	3
Match 2/8	Preliminary round – Group B	24 September 2000	White	Netherlands	Won	16	8	8
Match 3/8	Preliminary round – Group B	25 September 2000	Blue	Croatia	Lost	7	8	–1
Match 4/8	Preliminary round – Group B	26 September 2000	White	United States	Won	10	9	1
Match 5/8	Preliminary round – Group B	27 September 2000	Blue	Yugoslavia (Note: After the breakup of Yugoslavia, FR Yugoslavia men's national water polo team participated at the 1996 and 2000 Olympics, and won a bronze medal in 2000. In 2003, after the country was renamed from FR Yugoslavia to Serbia and Montenegro, the team was also renamed to "Serbia and Montenegro men's national water polo team".)	Lost	9	10	–1
Match 6/8	Quarter-finals	29 September 2000	Blue	Italy	Won	8	5	3
Match 7/8	Semi-finals	30 September 2000	White	Yugoslavia	Won	8	7	1
Match 8/8	Gold medal match	1 October 2000	Blue	Russia	Won	13	6	7
Total	Matches played: 8 • Wins: 6 • Ties: 0 • Defeats: 2 • Win %: 75.0%					78	57	21

Source: Official Results Books (PDF): 2000 (pp. 45, 50, 55, 78, 81, 84, 87, 90).

- Head coach: (Hungary) Dénes Kemény (1st title as head coach)

Roster
Cap No.	Player	Pos	L/R	Height	Weight	Date of birth	Age of winning gold	Oly debut	ISHOF member
1	Zoltán Kósz	GK	R	1.92 m (6 ft 4 in)	93 kg (205 lb)	26 November 1967	32 years, 310 days	No	
2	Bulcsú Székely	FP	R	1.80 m (5 ft 11 in)	82 kg (181 lb)	2 June 1976	24 years, 121 days	Yes	
3	Tamás Märcz	FP	R	1.86 m (6 ft 1 in)	82 kg (181 lb)	17 July 1974	26 years, 76 days	Yes	
4	Zsolt Varga	FP	R	1.93 m (6 ft 4 in)	96 kg (212 lb)	9 March 1972	28 years, 206 days	No	
5	Tamás Kásás	FP	R	2.00 m (6 ft 7 in)	90 kg (198 lb)	20 July 1976	24 years, 73 days	No	2016
6	Attila Vári	FP	R	2.00 m (6 ft 7 in)	93 kg (205 lb)	26 February 1976	24 years, 218 days	Yes	
7	Gergely Kiss	FP	L	1.99 m (6 ft 6 in)	100 kg (220 lb)	21 September 1977	23 years, 10 days	Yes	2016
8	Tibor Benedek	FP	L	1.90 m (6 ft 3 in)	96 kg (212 lb)	12 July 1972	28 years, 81 days	No	2016
9	Rajmund Fodor	FP	R	1.90 m (6 ft 3 in)	94 kg (207 lb)	21 February 1976	24 years, 223 days	No	
10	Zoltán Szécsi	GK	R	1.98 m (6 ft 6 in)	93 kg (205 lb)	22 December 1977	22 years, 284 days	Yes	2016
11	Barnabás Steinmetz	FP	R	1.96 m (6 ft 5 in)	98 kg (216 lb)	6 October 1975	24 years, 361 days	Yes	
12	Tamás Molnár	FP	R	1.93 m (6 ft 4 in)	98 kg (216 lb)	2 August 1975	25 years, 60 days	Yes	2016
13	Péter Biros	FP	R	1.94 m (6 ft 4 in)	95 kg (209 lb)	5 April 1976	24 years, 179 days	Yes	2016
Average				1.93 m (6 ft 4 in)	93 kg (205 lb)	21 January 1975	25 years, 254 days		
Coach	Dénes Kemény					14 June 1954	46 years, 109 days		2011

Sources:

- Official Results Books (PDF): 2000 (pp. 45, 50, 55, 78, 81, 84, 87, 90);
- Olympedia: 2000 (men's tournament);
- ISHOF.

Abbreviation

- MP – Matches played
- Min – Minutes
- G – Goals
- Sh – Shots
- AS – Assists
- TF – Turnover fouls
- ST – Steals
- BL – Blocked shots
- SP – Sprints
- 20S – 20 seconds exclusion
- Pen – Penalty
- EX – Exclusion

Statistics
Cap No.	Player	Pos	MP	Minutes played		Goals/Shots			AS	TF	ST	BL	Sprints			Personal fouls		
Cap No.	Player	Pos	MP	Min	%	G	Sh	%	AS	TF	ST	BL	Won	SP	%	20S	Pen	EX
1	Zoltán Kósz	GK	8	203	90.6%						7							
2	Bulcsú Székely	FP	8	35	15.6%	2	5	40.0%	2			1						
3	Tamás Märcz	FP	8	36	16.1%	0	3	0.0%	1	1	1	3				2		
4	Zsolt Varga	FP	8	64	28.6%	3	7	42.9%	5	5		2				2		
5	Tamás Kásás	FP	8	211	94.2%	12	33	36.4%	11	1	7	4	15	29	51.7%	7		
6	Attila Vári	FP	8	98	43.8%	10	25	40.0%		1	2	2				19	1	
7	Gergely Kiss	FP	8	155	69.2%	14	24	58.3%	10	2	2	4				4		
8	Tibor Benedek	FP	8	168	75.0%	9	21	42.9%	3	8	4	2				4		
9	Rajmund Fodor	FP	8	154	68.8%	8	15	53.3%	4	1	2	7				7		
10	Zoltán Szécsi	GK	8	21	9.4%					1								
11	Barnabás Steinmetz	FP	8	164	73.2%	6	16	37.5%		3	10	4				16		
12	Tamás Molnár	FP	8	142	63.4%	10	23	43.5%	3	26	2	3	1	1	100%	4		
13	Péter Biros	FP	8	117	52.2%	4	16	25.0%	2	5	1	6	2	2	100%	5		
Total			8	224	100%	78	188	41.5%	41	54	38	38	18	32	56.2%	70	1	0
Against						57	202	28.2%	34	30	36	23	14	32	43.8%	91	3	5

Cap No.	Player	Pos	Saves/Shots		
Cap No.	Player	Pos	Saves	Shots	%
1	Zoltán Kósz	GK	58	112	51.8%
10	Zoltán Szécsi	GK	6	9	66.7%
Total			64	121	52.9%

Source: Official Results Books (PDF): 2000 (pp. 45, 50, 55, 78, 81, 84, 87, 90).

=== 2004 Summer Olympics ===
- Edition of men's tournament: 24th
- Host city: Athens, Greece
- Number of participating teams: 12
- Competition format: Round-robin pools advanced teams to classification matches
- Champion: Hungary (8th title; 1st place in preliminary A group)

Results
Match	Round	Date	Cap color	Opponent	Result	Goals for	Goals against	Goal diff.
Match 1/7	Preliminary round – Group A	15 August 2004	Blue	Serbia and Montenegro	Won	6	4	2
Match 2/7	Preliminary round – Group A	17 August 2004	White	Croatia	Won	10	8	2
Match 3/7	Preliminary round – Group A	19 August 2004	Blue	United States	Won	7	5	2
Match 4/7	Preliminary round – Group A	21 August 2004	Blue	Kazakhstan	Won	14	4	10
Match 5/7	Preliminary round – Group A	23 August 2004	Blue	Russia	Won	7	6	1
Match 6/7	Semi-finals	27 August 2004	White	Russia	Won	7	5	2
Match 7/7	Gold medal match	29 August 2004	White	Serbia and Montenegro	Won	8	7	1
Total	Matches played: 7 • Wins: 7 • Ties: 0 • Defeats: 0 • Win %: 100%					59	39	20

Source: Official Results Books (PDF): 2004 (pp. 93, 101, 105, 109, 116, 164, 173).

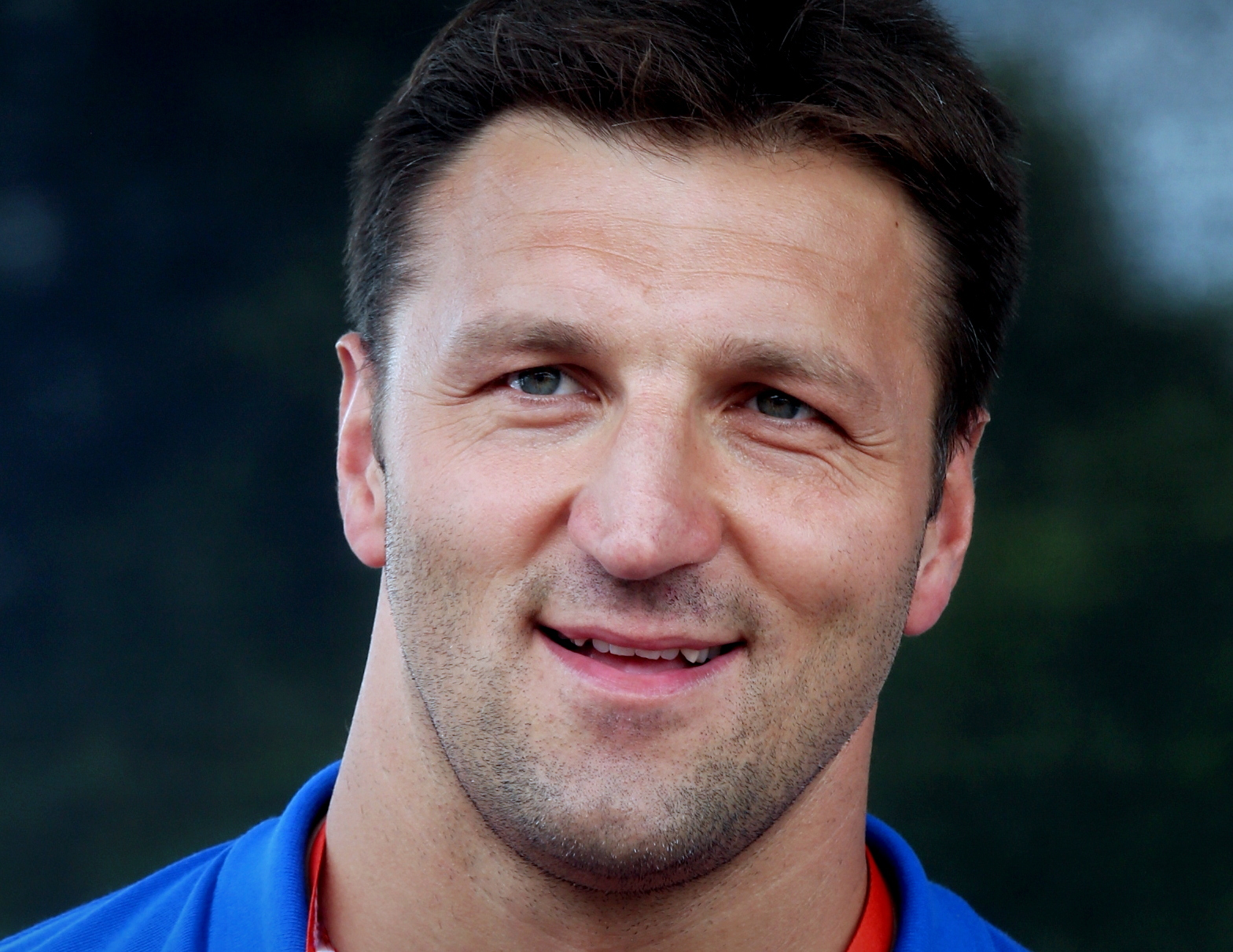
Gergely Kiss scored 14 goals at the 2004 Olympics, helping Hungary win gold. He was named the Most Valuable Player of the men's water polo tournament.

- Head coach: (Hungary) Dénes Kemény (2nd title as head coach)
- Assistant coach: (Hungary) Csaba Mátéfalvy

Roster
Cap No.	Player	Pos	L/R	Height	Weight	Date of birth	Age of winning gold	Oly debut	ISHOF member
1	Zoltán Szécsi	GK	R	1.98 m (6 ft 6 in)	93 kg (205 lb)	22 December 1977	26 years, 251 days	No	2016
2	Tamás Varga	FP	R	2.01 m (6 ft 7 in)	105 kg (231 lb)	14 July 1975	29 years, 46 days	Yes	
3	Norbert Madaras	FP	L	1.91 m (6 ft 3 in)	87 kg (192 lb)	1 December 1979	24 years, 272 days	Yes	
4	Ádám Steinmetz	FP	R	1.97 m (6 ft 6 in)	95 kg (209 lb)	11 August 1980	24 years, 18 days	Yes	
5	Tamás Kásás	FP	R	2.00 m (6 ft 7 in)	90 kg (198 lb)	20 July 1976	28 years, 40 days	No	2016
6	Attila Vári	FP	R	2.00 m (6 ft 7 in)	93 kg (205 lb)	26 February 1976	28 years, 185 days	No	
7	Gergely Kiss	FP	L	1.99 m (6 ft 6 in)	100 kg (220 lb)	21 September 1977	26 years, 343 days	No	2016
8	Tibor Benedek (C)	FP	L	1.90 m (6 ft 3 in)	96 kg (212 lb)	12 July 1972	32 years, 48 days	No	2016
9	Rajmund Fodor	FP	R	1.90 m (6 ft 3 in)	94 kg (207 lb)	21 February 1976	28 years, 190 days	No	
10	István Gergely	GK	R	2.01 m (6 ft 7 in)	110 kg (243 lb)	20 August 1976	28 years, 9 days	No	
11	Barnabás Steinmetz	FP	R	1.96 m (6 ft 5 in)	98 kg (216 lb)	6 October 1975	28 years, 328 days	No	
12	Tamás Molnár	FP	R	1.93 m (6 ft 4 in)	98 kg (216 lb)	2 August 1975	29 years, 27 days	No	2016
13	Péter Biros	FP	R	1.94 m (6 ft 4 in)	95 kg (209 lb)	5 April 1976	28 years, 146 days	No	2016
Average				1.96 m (6 ft 5 in)	96 kg (212 lb)	20 September 1976	27 years, 344 days		
Coach	Dénes Kemény					14 June 1954	50 years, 76 days		2011

Note: Ádám Steinmetz and Barnabás Steinmetz are brothers.
Sources:

- Official Results Books (PDF): 2004 (p. 208);
- ISHOF.

Abbreviation

- MP – Matches played
- Min – Minutes
- G – Goals
- Sh – Shots
- AS – Assists
- TF – Turnover fouls
- ST – Steals
- BL – Blocked shots
- SP – Sprints
- 20S – 20 seconds exclusion
- Pen – Penalty
- EX – Exclusion

Statistics
Cap No.	Player	Pos	MP	Minutes played		Goals/Shots			AS	TF	ST	BL	Sprints			Personal fouls		
Cap No.	Player	Pos	MP	Min	%	G	Sh	%	AS	TF	ST	BL	Won	SP	%	20S	Pen	EX
1	Zoltán Szécsi	GK	7	168	85.7%						6							
2	Tamás Varga	FP	7	48	24.5%	3	5	60.0%		3	1	1				12		2
3	Norbert Madaras	FP	7	76	38.8%	5	10	50.0%	1	2	5		3	9	33.3%	3		
4	Ádám Steinmetz	FP	7	82	41.8%	3	5	60.0%	1	11	3	3						
5	Tamás Kásás	FP	7	183	93.4%	14	30	46.7%	3	7	8	6	7	9	77.8%	3		
6	Attila Vári	FP	7	70	35.7%	2	18	11.1%	2		3	1				11		1
7	Gergely Kiss	FP	7	168	85.7%	14	31	45.2%	7	2	5	3				7		
8	Tibor Benedek (C)	FP	7	142	72.4%	5	21	23.8%	4	8	7	1				6	1	
9	Rajmund Fodor	FP	7	81	41.3%	4	10	40.0%	3	2	3					2		
10	István Gergely	GK	7	28	14.3%				1									
11	Barnabás Steinmetz	FP	7	56	28.6%	0	1	0.0%			5	1				12		1
12	Tamás Molnár	FP	7	107	54.6%	2	7	28.6%		15	1	2				2		
13	Péter Biros	FP	7	163	83.2%	7	27	25.9%	2	1	5	2	4	10	40.0%	4		
Total			7	196	100%	59	165	35.8%	24	51	52	20	14	28	50.0%	62	1	4
Against						39	129	30.2%	12	85	36	19	13	28	46.4%	70	7	10

Cap No.	Player	Pos	Saves/Shots		
Cap No.	Player	Pos	Saves	Shots	%
1	Zoltán Szécsi	GK	40	75	53.3%
10	István Gergely	GK	8	12	66.7%
Total			48	87	55.2%

Source: Official Results Books (PDF): 2004 (p. 207).

=== 2008 Summer Olympics ===
- Edition of men's tournament: 25th
- Host city: Beijing, China
- Number of participating teams: 12
- Competition format: Round-robin pools advanced teams to classification matches
- Champion: Hungary (9th title; 1st place in preliminary A group)

Results
Match	Round	Date	Cap color	Opponent	Result	Goals for	Goals against	Goal diff.
Match 1/7	Preliminary round – Group A	10 August 2008	White	Montenegro	Drawn	10	10	0
Match 2/7	Preliminary round – Group A	12 August 2008	Blue	Greece	Won	17	6	11
Match 3/7	Preliminary round – Group A	14 August 2008	White	Spain	Won	8	5	3
Match 4/7	Preliminary round – Group A	16 August 2008	Blue	Australia	Won	13	12	1
Match 5/7	Preliminary round – Group A	18 August 2008	White	Canada	Won	12	3	9
Match 6/7	Semi-finals	22 August 2008	White	Montenegro	Won	11	9	2
Match 7/7	Gold medal match	24 August 2008	White	United States	Won	14	10	4
Total	Matches played: 7 • Wins: 6 • Ties: 1 • Defeats: 0 • Win %: 85.7%					85	55	30

Source: Official Results Books (PDF): 2008 (pp. 84, 92, 94, 104, 106, 156, 168).

- Head coach: (Hungary) Dénes Kemény (3rd title as head coach)
- Assistant coach: (Hungary) Csaba Mátéfalvy

Roster
Cap No.	Player	Pos	L/R	Height	Weight	Date of birth	Age of winning gold	Oly debut	ISHOF member
1	Zoltán Szécsi	GK	R	1.98 m (6 ft 6 in)	96 kg (212 lb)	22 December 1977	30 years, 246 days	No	2016
2	Tamás Varga	FP	R	2.01 m (6 ft 7 in)	105 kg (231 lb)	14 July 1975	33 years, 41 days	No	
3	Norbert Madaras	FP	L	1.91 m (6 ft 3 in)	91 kg (201 lb)	1 December 1979	28 years, 267 days	No	
4	Dénes Varga	FP	R	1.93 m (6 ft 4 in)	97 kg (214 lb)	29 March 1987	21 years, 148 days	Yes	
5	Tamás Kásás	FP	R	2.00 m (6 ft 7 in)	94 kg (207 lb)	20 July 1976	32 years, 35 days	No	2016
6	Norbert Hosnyánszky	FP	R	1.96 m (6 ft 5 in)	94 kg (207 lb)	4 March 1984	24 years, 173 days	Yes	
7	Gergely Kiss	FP	L	1.99 m (6 ft 6 in)	112 kg (247 lb)	21 September 1977	30 years, 338 days	No	2016
8	Tibor Benedek (C)	FP	L	1.90 m (6 ft 3 in)	96 kg (212 lb)	12 July 1972	36 years, 43 days	No	2016
9	Dániel Varga	FP	R	2.00 m (6 ft 7 in)	95 kg (209 lb)	25 September 1983	24 years, 334 days	Yes	
10	Péter Biros	FP	R	1.94 m (6 ft 4 in)	95 kg (209 lb)	5 April 1976	32 years, 141 days	No	2016
11	Gábor Kis	FP	R	1.94 m (6 ft 4 in)	108 kg (238 lb)	27 September 1982	25 years, 332 days	Yes	
12	Tamás Molnár	FP	R	1.93 m (6 ft 4 in)	104 kg (229 lb)	2 August 1975	33 years, 22 days	No	2016
13	István Gergely	GK	R	2.01 m (6 ft 7 in)	112 kg (247 lb)	20 August 1976	32 years, 4 days	No	
Average				1.96 m (6 ft 5 in)	100 kg (220 lb)	20 December 1978	29 years, 248 days		
Coach	Dénes Kemény					14 June 1954	54 years, 71 days		2011

Note: Dániel Varga and Dénes Varga are brothers.
Sources:

- Official Results Books (PDF): 2008 (p. 203);
- ISHOF.

Abbreviation

- MP – Matches played
- Min – Minutes
- G – Goals
- Sh – Shots
- AS – Assists
- TF – Turnover fouls
- ST – Steals
- BL – Blocked shots
- SP – Sprints
- 20S – 20 seconds exclusion
- Pen – Penalty
- EX – Exclusion

Statistics
Cap No.	Player	Pos	MP	Minutes played		Goals/Shots			AS	TF	ST	BL	Sprints			Personal fouls		
Cap No.	Player	Pos	MP	Min	%	G	Sh	%	AS	TF	ST	BL	Won	SP	%	20S	Pen	EX
1	Zoltán Szécsi	GK	7	151	67.4%						3							
2	Tamás Varga	FP	7	70	31.3%	0	9	0.0%		5		1				12		2
3	Norbert Madaras	FP	7	131	58.5%	9	19	47.4%	5	3	3		3	6	50.0%	5	1	1
4	Dénes Varga	FP	7	113	50.4%	10	18	55.6%	1	5	4	3	1	4	25.0%	3		
5	Tamás Kásás	FP	7	179	79.9%	8	29	27.6%	6	8	11	4	10	12	83.3%	6		
6	Norbert Hosnyánszky	FP	7	45	20.1%	2	7	28.6%		2	2	1				11	1	4
7	Gergely Kiss	FP	7	178	79.5%	9	25	36.0%	12	12	1	1	1	1	100%	9		
8	Tibor Benedek (C)	FP	7	128	57.1%	10	18	55.6%	3	6	6	1				6		
9	Dániel Varga	FP	7	108	48.2%	8	20	40.0%	3	5	3	3				9		1
10	Péter Biros	FP	7	176	78.6%	13	23	56.5%	3	4	8	8	3	5	60.0%	3	1	
11	Gábor Kis	FP	7	104	46.4%	6	9	66.7%	2	15	2	3				3		
12	Tamás Molnár	FP	7	111	49.6%	10	19	52.6%		21		2				6		
13	István Gergely	GK	7	73	32.6%	0	1	0.0%	1		4							
Team										2								
Total			7	224	100%	85	197	43.1%	36	88	47	27	18	28	64.3%	73	3	8
Against						55	195	28.2%	19	93	52	27	10	28	35.7%	74	7	9

Cap No.	Player	Pos	Saves/Shots		
Cap No.	Player	Pos	Saves	Shots	%
1	Zoltán Szécsi	GK	42	83	50.6%
13	István Gergely	GK	24	38	63.2%
Total			66	121	54.5%

Source: Official Results Books (PDF): 2008 (p. 202).

== Water polo people at the opening and closing ceremonies ==
=== Flag bearers ===
Some sportspeople were chosen to carry the national flag of their country at the opening and closing ceremonies of the Olympic Games. As of the 2020 Summer Olympics, two male water polo people were given the honour to carry the flag for Hungary.

Legend

- 2008 O – Opening ceremony of the 2008 Summer Olympics
- 2012 C – Closing ceremony of the 2012 Summer Olympics
- Flag bearer^{‡} – Flag bearer who won the tournament with his team

Water polo people who were flag bearers at the opening and closing ceremonies of the Olympic Games
#	Year	Country	Flag bearer	Birth	Age	Height	Team	Pos	Water polo tournaments					Period (age of first/last)	Medals				Ref
#	Year	Country	Flag bearer	Birth	Age	Height	Team	Pos	1	2	3	4	5	Period (age of first/last)	G	S	B	T	Ref
1	1980 O	Hungary	István Szívós Sr.	1920	59	1.85 m (6 ft 1 in)	Hungary	FP	1948	1952	1956			8 years (27/36)	2	1	0	3	
2	2012 O	Hungary	Péter Biros	1976	36	1.96 m (6 ft 5 in)	Hungary	FP	2000	2004	2008	2012		12 years (24/36)	3	0	0	3	

== See also ==
- Hungary women's Olympic water polo team records and statistics
- List of men's Olympic water polo tournament records and statistics
- Lists of Olympic water polo records and statistics
- Hungary at the Olympics

== Sources ==
=== Official Reports (IOC) ===
PDF documents in the LA84 Foundation Digital Library:

- Official Report of the 1896 Olympic Games (download, archive)
- Official Report of the 1900 Olympic Games (download, archive)
- Official Report of the 1904 Olympic Games (download, archive)
- Official Report of the 1908 Olympic Games (download, archive) (pp. 359–361)
- Official Report of the 1912 Olympic Games (download, archive) (pp. 1021–1024, 1031–1037)
- Official Report of the 1920 Olympic Games (download, archive) (p. 130)
- Official Report of the 1924 Olympic Games (download, archive) (pp. 439–440, 486–494)
- Official Report of the 1928 Olympic Games (download, archive) (pp. 746–757, 797–807)
- Official Report of the 1932 Olympic Games (download, archive) (pp. 619–623, 646–652)
- Official Report of the 1936 Olympic Games, v.2 (download, archive) (pp. 345–356)
- Official Report of the 1948 Olympic Games (download, archive) (pp. 537–540, 640–647)
- Official Report of the 1952 Olympic Games (download, archive) (pp. 600–608)
- Official Report of the 1956 Olympic Games (download, archive) (pp. 592–594, 624–627)
- Official Report of the 1960 Olympic Games (download, archive) (pp. 552–555, 617–634)
- Official Report of the 1964 Olympic Games, v.2 (download, archive) (pp. 682–698)
- Official Report of the 1968 Olympic Games, v.3 (download, archive) (pp. 449–466, 811–826)
- Official Report of the 1972 Olympic Games, v.3 (download, archive) (pp. 331, 353–365)
- Official Report of the 1976 Olympic Games, v.3 (download, archive) (pp. 446–447, 484–497)
- Official Report of the 1980 Olympic Games, v.3 (download, archive) (pp. 458, 495–510)
- Official Report of the 1984 Olympic Games, v.2 (download, archive) (pp. 528–534)
- Official Report of the 1988 Olympic Games, v.2 (download, archive) (pp. 590–598)
- Official Report of the 1992 Olympic Games, v.5 (download, archive) (pp. 354, 386–400)
- Official Report of the 1996 Olympic Games, v.3 (download, archive) (pp. 56–73)

=== Official Results Books (IOC) ===
PDF documents in the LA84 Foundation Digital Library:

- Official Results Book – 2000 Olympic Games – Water Polo (download, archive)
- Official Results Book – 2004 Olympic Games – Water Polo (download, archive)
- Official Results Book – 2008 Olympic Games – Water Polo (download, archive)

PDF documents on the FINA website:

- Official Results Book – 2012 Olympic Games – Diving, Swimming, Synchronised Swimming, Water Polo (archive) (pp. 284–507)

PDF documents in the Olympic World Library:

- Official Results Book – 2016 Olympic Games – Water Polo (archive)

PDF documents on the International Olympic Committee website:

- Official Results Book – 2020 Olympic Games – Water Polo (archive)
- Official Results Book – 2024 Olympic Games – Water Polo

=== Official Reports (FINA) ===
PDF documents on the FINA website:

- HistoFINA – Water polo medalists and statistics (as of September 2019) (archive) (pp. 4–13)
- 1870–2020 | 150 years of Water Polo – Evolution of its rules (archive)

=== Official website (IOC) ===
Water polo on the International Olympic Committee website:

- Water polo
- Men's water polo

=== Olympedia ===
Water polo on the Olympedia website:

- Water polo Archived 2021-12-28 at the Wayback Machine
- Men's water polo
- Athlete count for water polo
- Water polo venues
- Water polo at the 1900 Summer Olympics (men's tournament)
- Water polo at the 1904 Summer Olympics (men's tournament)
- Water polo at the 1908 Summer Olympics (men's tournament)
- Water polo at the 1912 Summer Olympics (men's tournament)
- Water polo at the 1920 Summer Olympics (men's tournament)
- Water polo at the 1924 Summer Olympics (men's tournament)
- Water polo at the 1928 Summer Olympics (men's tournament)
- Water polo at the 1932 Summer Olympics (men's tournament)
- Water polo at the 1936 Summer Olympics (men's tournament)
- Water polo at the 1948 Summer Olympics (men's tournament)
- Water polo at the 1952 Summer Olympics (men's tournament)
- Water polo at the 1956 Summer Olympics (men's tournament)
- Water polo at the 1960 Summer Olympics (men's tournament)
- Water polo at the 1964 Summer Olympics (men's tournament)
- Water polo at the 1968 Summer Olympics (men's tournament)
- Water polo at the 1972 Summer Olympics (men's tournament)
- Water polo at the 1976 Summer Olympics (men's tournament)
- Water polo at the 1980 Summer Olympics (men's tournament)
- Water polo at the 1984 Summer Olympics (men's tournament)
- Water polo at the 1988 Summer Olympics (men's tournament)
- Water polo at the 1992 Summer Olympics (men's tournament)
- Water polo at the 1996 Summer Olympics (men's tournament)
- Water polo at the 2000 Summer Olympics (men's tournament)
- Water polo at the 2004 Summer Olympics (men's tournament)
- Water polo at the 2008 Summer Olympics (men's tournament)
- Water polo at the 2012 Summer Olympics (men's tournament)
- Water polo at the 2016 Summer Olympics (men's tournament)
- Water polo at the 2020 Summer Olympics (men's tournament)

=== Sports Reference ===
Water polo on the Sports Reference website:

- Country Medal Leaders & Athlete Medal Leaders (1900–2016) (archived)
- Men's water polo (1900–2016) (archived)
- Water polo at the 1900 Summer Games (men's tournament) (archived)
- Water polo at the 1904 Summer Games (men's tournament) (archived)
- Water polo at the 1908 Summer Games (men's tournament) (archived)
- Water polo at the 1912 Summer Games (men's tournament) (archived)
- Water polo at the 1920 Summer Games (men's tournament) (archived)
- Water polo at the 1924 Summer Games (men's tournament) (archived)
- Water polo at the 1928 Summer Games (men's tournament) (archived)
- Water polo at the 1932 Summer Games (men's tournament) (archived)
- Water polo at the 1936 Summer Games (men's tournament) (archived)
- Water polo at the 1948 Summer Games (men's tournament) (archived)
- Water polo at the 1952 Summer Games (men's tournament) (archived)
- Water polo at the 1956 Summer Games (men's tournament) (archived)
- Water polo at the 1960 Summer Games (men's tournament) (archived)
- Water polo at the 1964 Summer Games (men's tournament) (archived)
- Water polo at the 1968 Summer Games (men's tournament) (archived)
- Water polo at the 1972 Summer Games (men's tournament) (archived)
- Water polo at the 1976 Summer Games (men's tournament) (archived)
- Water polo at the 1980 Summer Games (men's tournament) (archived)
- Water polo at the 1984 Summer Games (men's tournament) (archived)
- Water polo at the 1988 Summer Games (men's tournament) (archived)
- Water polo at the 1992 Summer Games (men's tournament) (archived)
- Water polo at the 1996 Summer Games (men's tournament) (archived)
- Water polo at the 2000 Summer Games (men's tournament) (archived)
- Water polo at the 2004 Summer Games (men's tournament) (archived)
- Water polo at the 2008 Summer Games (men's tournament) (archived)
- Water polo at the 2012 Summer Games (men's tournament) (archived)
- Water polo at the 2016 Summer Games (men's tournament) (archived)
- Water polo at the 2020 Summer Games (men's tournament) (archived)

=== Todor66 ===
Water polo on the Todor66 website:

- Water polo at the Summer Games
- Water polo at the 1900 Summer Olympics (men's tournament)
- Water polo at the 1904 Summer Olympics (men's tournament)
- Water polo at the 1908 Summer Olympics (men's tournament)
- Water polo at the 1912 Summer Olympics (men's tournament)
- Water polo at the 1920 Summer Olympics (men's tournament)
- Water polo at the 1924 Summer Olympics (men's tournament)
- Water polo at the 1928 Summer Olympics (men's tournament)
- Water polo at the 1932 Summer Olympics (men's tournament)
- Water polo at the 1936 Summer Olympics (men's tournament)
- Water polo at the 1948 Summer Olympics (men's tournament)
- Water polo at the 1952 Summer Olympics (men's tournament)
- Water polo at the 1956 Summer Olympics (men's tournament)
- Water polo at the 1960 Summer Olympics (men's tournament)
- Water polo at the 1964 Summer Olympics (men's tournament)
- Water polo at the 1968 Summer Olympics (men's tournament, men's qualification)
- Water polo at the 1972 Summer Olympics (men's tournament, men's qualification)
- Water polo at the 1976 Summer Olympics (men's tournament, men's European qualification)
- Water polo at the 1980 Summer Olympics (men's tournament, men's European qualification, men's world qualification)
- Water polo at the 1984 Summer Olympics (men's tournament, men's qualification)
- Water polo at the 1988 Summer Olympics (men's tournament, men's qualification)
- Water polo at the 1992 Summer Olympics (men's tournament, men's qualification)
- Water polo at the 1996 Summer Olympics (men's tournament, men's qualification)
- Water polo at the 2000 Summer Olympics (men's tournament, men's qualification)
- Water polo at the 2004 Summer Olympics (men's tournament, men's qualification)
- Water polo at the 2008 Summer Olympics (men's tournament, men's qualification)
- Water polo at the 2012 Summer Olympics (men's tournament, men's qualification)
- Water polo at the 2016 Summer Olympics (men's tournament, men's qualification)
- Water polo at the 2020 Summer Olympics (men's tournament, men's qualification)
- Water polo at the 2024 Summer Olympics (men's tournament, men's qualification)

=== ISHOF ===
International Swimming Hall of Fame (ISHOF) website:

- Honorees Listed by Category – Water Polo
- Honorees Listed by Category – Coaches
- Honorees Listed by Category – Contributors
- Honorees by Country
- Honorees By Last Name
