= Béla Rajki =

Hungarian water polo player and coach (1909–2000)

Bela Rajki

Béla Rajki-Reich (2 February 1909 – 20 July 2000) was a Hungarian swimming and water polo coach.

== Early life ==
Rajki was born in Budapest. He was a swimmer and a water polo player early in his life. He received coaching diplomas in swimming and diving, and was a lecturer at the Hungarian College of Physical Education and Sports.

== Swimming and water polo coaching career ==
From 1948 to 1967 he was director of Hungary's National Sport Swimming Pool, and from 1947 to 1973 he was technical director and national coach of the Hungarian Swimming and Water Polo Teams.

He was head coach of the Hungarian 1948 Olympic Swimming Team, which won a gold medal (Eva Novak; 200m breaststroke). He coached the country's swimming and water polo Olympic teams of 1952 in Helsinki. His water polo team won a gold medal, and four swimmers won a gold medal. In 1956, he coached the water polo team which won a gold medal, and the team won a silver medal in 1972 at the Munich Olympics.

He was a Bureau member of Fédération Internationale de Natation (FINA) from 1952 to 1960, and a FINA vice president from 1960 to 1964. He was also a member of the International Water Polo Board from 1952 to 1964 (Chairman from 1960 to 1964). By 1996, aged 86, he was still a member of the Hungarian Olympic Committee. He died on 20 July 2000, aged 91.

== Publications and honors ==
He authored The Techniques of Competitive Swimming (1956), Water Polo (1958), and Teaching to Swim, Learning to Swim (1978). He also wrote over 250 articles and periodical studies in the sport.

The International Swimming Hall of Fame honored him in 1996. He was also inducted into the International Jewish Sports Hall of Fame.

== See also ==
- Hungary men's Olympic water polo team records and statistics
- List of Olympic champions in men's water polo
- List of members of the International Swimming Hall of Fame
- Blood in the Water match
