= Colin Gray =

Colin Gray may refer to:

- Colin Falkland Gray (1914–1995), New Zealand fighter ace of the Second World War
- Colin Keith Gray, Canadian actor, writer and film director
- Colin S. Gray (1943–2020), British-American scholar of international relations
- Colin Gray, father of American shooting suspect Colt Gray
