= Gyuri =

Gyuri is a given name used in both Hungarian and Korean culture.

== Hungarian name ==
As a Hungarian name, Gyuri (pronounced /ɟuri/, starting with a voiced palatal stop) is a masculine name. It is a diminutive of György. People with this name include:

- Gyuri Sarossy (born 1974), British actor of Hungarian descent.
- Ioan Gyuri Pascu (born 1961), Romanian pop singer of partially Hungarian descent

== Korean name ==
- Gyuri
- Hangul: 규리
- RR: Gyuri
- MR: Kyuri
- IPA: [kjuɾi]

As a Korean given name, it may also be spelled Gyu-ri or Kyu-ri.

Korean people with this name include:

- Kim Gyu-ri (actress, born June 1979), South Korean actress
- Kim Gyu-ri (actress, born August 1979), South Korean actress
- Nam Gyu-ri (born 1985), South Korean singer, member of trio SeeYa
- Park Gyu-ri (born 1988), South Korean singer, member of Kara
- Jang Gyu-ri (born 1997) South Korean singer, member of Fromis 9

== See also ==
- List of Korean given names
