= László Jeney =

Hungarian water polo player

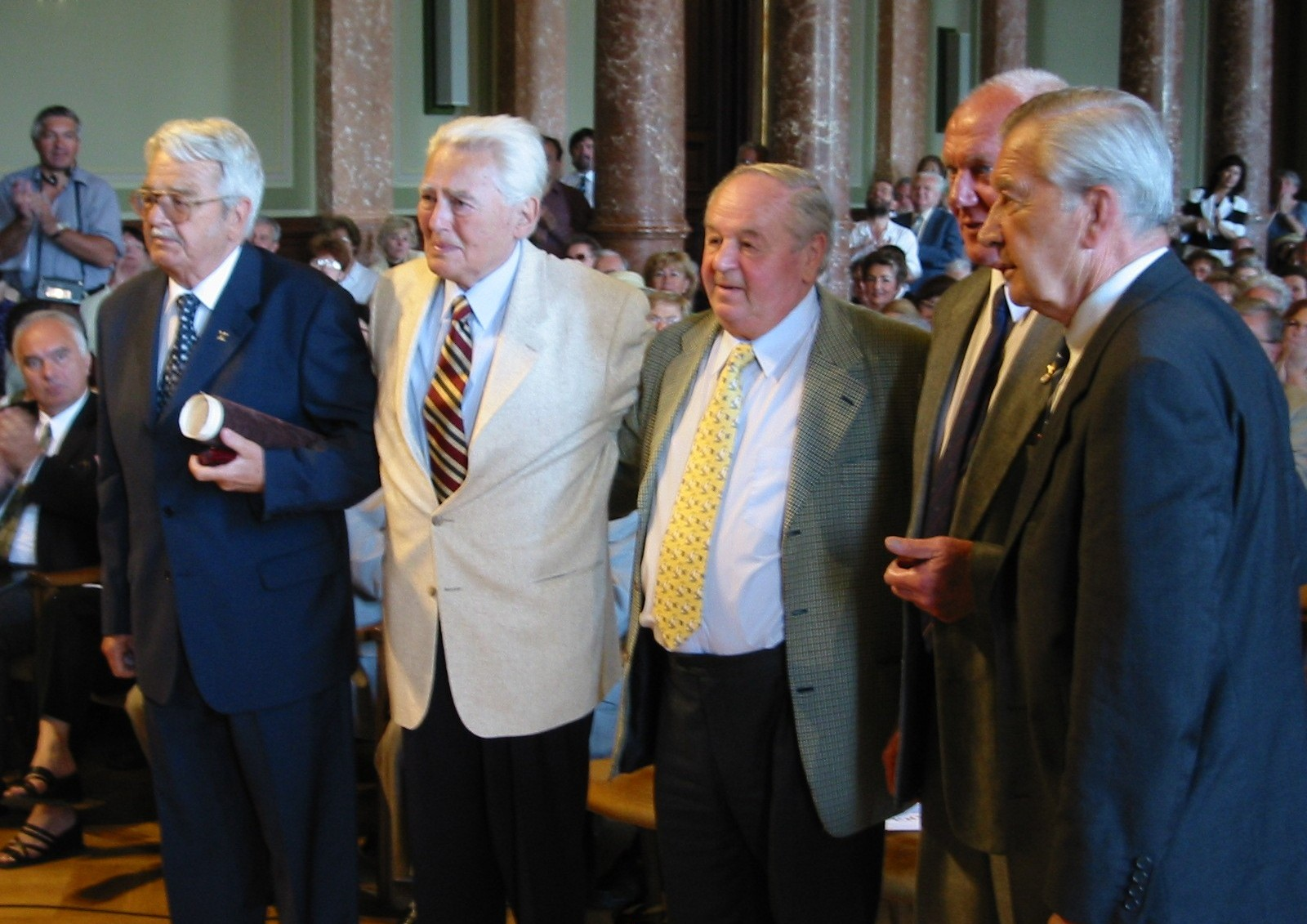

Personal information
- Born: May 30, 1923 Cluj-Napoca, Kingdom of Romania
- Died: April 24, 2006 (aged 82) Budapest, Hungary

Sport
- Sport: Water polo
Medal record
Representing Hungary
Olympic Games
Gold medal – first place	1952 Helsinki	Team competition
Gold medal – first place	1956 Melbourne	Team competition
Silver medal – second place	1948 London	Team competition
Bronze medal – third place	1960 Rome	Team competition

László Jeney (30 May 1923 – 24 April 2006) was a Hungarian water polo player who competed in the 1948 Summer Olympics, 1952 Summer Olympics, 1956 Summer Olympics, and 1960 Summer Olympics. He is one of eight male athletes who won four or more Olympic medals in water polo.

He was born in Cluj, Kingdom of Romania and died in Budapest.

Jeney was part of the Hungarian team which won the silver medal in the 1948 tournament. He played two matches as goalkeeper.

Four years later he was a member of the Hungarian team which won the gold medal in the 1952 Olympic tournament. He played six matches as goalkeeper.

At the 1956 Games he won again the gold medal with the Hungarian team. He played two matches as goalkeeper.

His last Olympic tournament was in Rome 1960 where he won the bronze medal. Again he played two matches as goalkeeper for the Hungarian team.

== See also ==
- Hungary men's Olympic water polo team records and statistics
- List of multiple Olympic medalists in one event
- List of Olympic champions in men's water polo
- List of Olympic medalists in water polo (men)
- List of players who have appeared in multiple men's Olympic water polo tournaments
- List of men's Olympic water polo tournament goalkeepers
- Blood in the Water match
