= The Hardy Boys (1995 TV series) =

1995 television series

- Based on: The Hardy Boys by Franklin W. Dixon
- Developed by: David Cole
- Starring: Colin Gray; Paul Popowich
- Composer: Pure West
- Countries of origin: United States; Canada; France
- Original languages: French; English
- No. of seasons: 1
- No. of episodes: 13

Production
- Executive producers: Patrick Loubert; Michael Hirsh; Pascal Breton; Olivier Bremond
- Producer: Michael Klein
- Running time: 30 minutes
- Production companies: Marathon Productions; Nelvana; Westcom Entertainment Group Ltd. New Line Television

Original release
- Network: France 2 (FR); Syndication (US)
- Release: September 23 – December 16, 1995

The Hardy Boys is a mystery television series, based on the long-running novels of the same name that originally aired from September 23 until December 16, 1995. It was co-produced by New Line Television (a division of New Line Cinema), Nelvana (Canada), and Marathon Productions, S.A. (France) in association with Westcom Entertainment Group Ltd. of Canada.

The show stars Paul Popowich as Joe Hardy and Colin Gray as Frank Hardy, with Fiona Highet cast as Kate Craigen. Tracy Ryan, who starred as the title character in the company's contemporaneous adaptation of the Nancy Drew novels, also made two crossover appearances as Drew.

== Cast ==
- Paul Popowich as Joe Hardy
- Fiona Highet as Kate Craigen
- Colin Gray as Frank Hardy

== Home media ==
On May 9, 2006, The Hardy Boys: The Complete First Season was released as a two-disc DVD set by kaBoom! Entertainment Inc.

== Episodes ==
No.	Title	Directed by	Written by	Original release date
1	"All That Glitters"	Jon Cassar	David Cole	September 23, 1995
Joe's infatuation with a mysterious young woman involves the boys with an ancient treasure.
2	"Jazzman"	Jon Cassar	David Cole	September 30, 1995
Frank and Joe's search for a missing bridegroom leads them into a forgotten world of fifties' jazz and gangland murder.
3	"A Perfect Stranger"	Don McCutcheon	David Barlow	October 7, 1995
A chance meeting with a young woman propels Frank and Joe into a story of mis-matched love.
4	"Say Cheese"	Clay Borris	Bill Taub	October 14, 1995
A chance photograph provides Frank and Joe with the essential clue in a case of blackmail and political corruption.
5	"Smart Drugs, Stupid Mistakes"	Jon Cassar	David Cole	October 21, 1995
A stolen disk drive leads Frank and Joe into the high-tech world of industrial espionage.
6	"Telling Lies"	Ron Oliver	David Cole	October 28, 1995
A young boy's imagination provides Frank and Joe with the clues to solving a six-year-old robbery.
7	"The Debt Collectors"	Don McCutcheon	Renata Bright	November 4, 1995
A summer job heats up when the house Joe is sitting in is invaded by two alarmingly inexperienced debt collectors.
8	"The Curse"	Ron Oliver	David Shore	November 11, 1995
Frank and Joe's attempts to help a cursed friend compels them to investigate the mysterious relationship between a psychic and a CEO.
9	"R.I.P."	Clay Borris	David Cole	November 18, 1995
A stolen locket leads the Hardy Boys into the dark worlds of grave-robbing and murder.
10	"Play Ball"	Don McCutcheon	David Cole	November 25, 1995
Frank and Joe enter the world of Major League Baseball to discover the hidden truth behind an attempt to ruin an athlete's reputation.
11	"Love Birds"	Eleanore Lindo	David Cole	December 2, 1995
Joe's purchase of a rare bird entangles the boys in a web of international intrigue.
12	"The Last Laugh"	Jon Cassar	Jeffrey Frohner	December 9, 1995
Together in Paris, the Hardy Boys and Nancy Drew join forces to recover the stolen plates for the 100 Franc note. Crossover with Nancy Drew (1995 TV series).
13	"No Dice"	Ron Oliver	Jeffrey Frohner	December 16, 1995
Driving in the south of France, the Hardy Boys and Nancy Drew find a clue in a car wreck which puts them on the trail of a famous jewel thief. Crossover with Nancy Drew (1995 TV series).
