= Gábor Schmiedt =

Hungarian water polo player

Personal information
- Nationality: Hungarian
- Born: 25 January 1962 (age 64) Budapest, Hungary

Sport
- Sport: Water polo
Medal record
Representing Hungary
World Championships
| Silver medal – second place | 1982 Guayaquil | Team competition |
| Bronze medal – third place | 1991 Perth | Team competition |
European Championships
| Silver medal – second place | 1983 Rome | Team competition |
| Bronze medal – third place | 1981 Split | Team competition |

Gábor Schmiedt (born 25 January 1962) is a Hungarian water polo player. He competed at the 1988 Summer Olympics and the 1992 Summer Olympics.

== See also ==
- List of World Aquatics Championships medalists in water polo
