= György Vízvári =

Hungarian water polo player

Personal information
- Born: December 18, 1928 Budapest, Hungary
- Died: July 30, 2004 (aged 75) Budapest, Hungary

Sport
- Sport: Water polo
Medal record
Representing Hungary
Olympic Games
Gold medal – first place	1952 Helsinki	Team competition

György Vízvári (German: György Weiss, December 18, 1928 – July 30, 2004) was a Hungarian water polo player who competed in the 1952 Summer Olympics.

He was born and died in Budapest.

Vízvári was part of the Hungarian team which won the gold medal in the 1952 tournament. He played seven matches.

He played 25 matches for the national team between 1949 and 1957.

== See also ==
- Hungary men's Olympic water polo team records and statistics
- List of Olympic champions in men's water polo
- List of Olympic medalists in water polo (men)
