= Róbert Antal =

Hungarian water polo player

Robert Antal

Personal information
- Born: Robert Adler; July 21, 1921 Budapest, Hungary
- Died: February 1, 1995 (aged 73) Toronto, Ontario, Canada

Sport
- Club: Magyar Testgyakorlók Köre (MTK, HUN)
Medal record
Men's Water Polo
Representing Hungary
Gold medal – first place	1952 Helsinki	Team competition

Róbert Antal (Former name: Róbert Adler, July 21, 1921 – February 1, 1995) was a Hungarian water polo player who competed in the 1952 Summer Olympics.

Antal, who was Jewish, was born in Budapest and died in Toronto, Canada.

== 1952 Olympics ==
Antal was part of the Hungarian Water Polo team which won the gold medal in the 1952 Helsinki Olympics. The victory was Hungary's third Olympic Gold medal title, and Hungary would prove to have a top rated National Water Polo Team. Antal played two matches. In the semi-final, Hungary beat the Soviet Union 6-4, the day after beating Egypt 9-0. A victory over the Soviet Team was noteworthy, as the Soviets had not been to an Olympics since the October Revolution of 1917, and their participation was carefully observed by the press.

Taking the gold medal in the final round, the Hungarian team defeated Yugoslavia, who took the Silver medal. Antal played goalkeeper.

== See also ==
- Hungary men's Olympic water polo team records and statistics
- List of Olympic champions in men's water polo
- List of Olympic medalists in water polo (men)
- List of men's Olympic water polo tournament goalkeepers
- List of select Jewish water polo players
