= József Vértesy =

Hungarian water polo player (1901–1983)

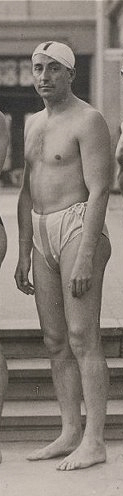

Personal information
- Born: 19 February 1901 Zombor, Austria-Hungary
- Died: 21 December 1983 (aged 82) Budapest, Hungary

Sport
- Sport: Water polo
Medal record
Representing Hungary
Olympic Games
Gold medal – first place	1932 Los Angeles	Team competition
Silver medal – second place	1928 Amsterdam	Team competition

József Vértesy (19 February 1901 – 21 December 1983) was a Hungarian water polo player who competed in the 1924 Summer Olympics, in the 1928 Summer Olympics, and in the 1932 Summer Olympics. Born in Zombor, Austria-Hungary (today Sombor, Serbia) and died in Budapest, Hungary.

He first competed at the Olympics in 1924. As a member of the Hungarian water polo team he finished seventh. He played one match. Also he was part of the Hungarian water polo team which won the silver medal in 1928 and the gold medal 1932. In Amsterdam at the 1928 Summer Olympics he played all four matches and scored seven goals. Four years later in Los Angeles he played all three matches.

== See also ==
- Hungary men's Olympic water polo team records and statistics
- List of Olympic champions in men's water polo
- List of Olympic medalists in water polo (men)
