= István Szívós (water polo, born 1920) =

Hungarian water polo player

Personal information
- Born: 20 August 1920 Szeged, Kingdom of Hungary
- Died: 22 June 1992 (aged 71) Budapest, Hungary

Sport
- Sport: Water polo
- Club: Magyar Testgyakorlók Köre; Budapesti Vasutas Sport Club
Medal record
Representing Hungary
Olympic Games
Silver medal – second place	1948 London	Team
Gold medal – first place	1952 Helsinki	Team
Gold medal – first place	1956 Melbourne	Team
European Water Polo Championship
Gold medal – first place	1954 Turin	Team

István Szívós Sr. (Hungarian: id. Szívós István, 20 August 1920 – 22 June 1992) was a Hungarian water polo player. He was part of the Hungarian teams that won gold medals at the 1952 and 1956 Olympics and placed second in 1948. At the 1956 Olympics he also took part in the 200 m breaststroke swimming competition, but failed to reach the final. In 1997 he was inducted into the International Swimming Hall of Fame, one year later than his son István Jr., who competed in water polo at the 1968–1980 Olympics. He was given the honour to carry the national flag of Hungary at the opening ceremony of the 1980 Summer Olympics in Moscow, becoming the 14th water polo player to be a flag bearer at the opening and closing ceremonies of the Olympics.

Szívós was born in Szeged and took up swimming and waterpolo after his family moved to Budapest in the 1930s. During World War II he served in the Hungarian Army between 1942 and 1943, and then returned to sport. He retired in 1959 and subsequently worked as a water polo coach in Hungary and Egypt (1964–66). In the late 1960s he brought his club Orvosegyetem SC to winning two national titles, one Hungarian Cup, and a third place in the European Cup tournament.

== See also ==
- Hungary men's Olympic water polo team records and statistics
- List of Olympic champions in men's water polo
- List of Olympic medalists in water polo (men)
- List of members of the International Swimming Hall of Fame
- Blood in the Water match
