= Györgyi =

Györgyi may refer to:

- Albert Szent-Györgyi (1893–1986), Hungarian physiologist who won the Nobel Prize in Physiology or Medicine in 1937
- Albert Szent-Györgyi Medical University, originally established in Kolozsvár, Transylvania, in 1872
- Dénes Györgyi (1886–1961), Hungarian architect, a member of the Györgyi-Giergl artistic family
- Györgyi Balogh (born 1948), Hungarian former sprinter
- Györgyi Farkas (born 1985), Hungarian heptathlete

== See also ==
- György, a given name
