= Tamás Varga (water polo) =

Hungarian water polo player

Personal information
- Nickname: Csuvi
- Nationality: Hungarian
- Born: 14 July 1975 (age 51) Szolnok, Hungary
- Height: 2.03 m (6 ft 8 in)

Sport
- Sport: Water polo
- Handedness: Right
- Position: Guard
- Current club: Hungary U14 (head coach); Hungary women's U18 (head coach)

Youth career
- Years: Team
- –: Szolnok

Senior clubs
- Years: Team
- –1994: Elektrosoft-Szolnok
- 1994–1996: Vasas-Plaket
- 1996–: Catania
- –: Basel
- 2000–2004: Vasas-Plaket-Euroleasing
- 2004–2005: Festival Nervi
- 2005–2006: UTE-VB Leasing
- 2006–2007: Chiavari
- 2007: → Sliema (Summer League)
- 2007–2009: Szeged Beton
- 2009–2010: Cattaro Maximus
- 2010: → Sirens (Summer League)
- 2010–2011: FTC-Fisher Klíma
- 2011–2015: Debrecen
National team
- Years: Team
- –: Hungary

Teams coached
- 2013–2017: Debrecen
- 2018–: Hungary U14
- 2019–: Hungary women's U18
Medal record
Men's water polo
Representing Hungary
Olympic Games
Gold medal – first place	2004 Athens	Team competition
Gold medal – first place	2008 Beijing	Team competition
World Championships
Gold medal – first place	2003 Barcelona	Team competition
European Championship
Silver medal – second place	1995 Vienna	Team competition
Bronze medal – third place	2001 Budapest	Team competition
Bronze medal – third place	2008 Málaga	Team competition

Tamás Varga (born 14 July 1975, in Szolnok) is a Hungarian water polo player. He was a member of the gold medal winning Hungary men's national water polo team at the 2004 Athens Olympics and the 2008 Beijing Olympics, and was also a member of the squad that finished 5th at the 2012 London Olympics.

== Honours ==
=== National ===
- Olympic Games: Gold medal - 2004, 2008
- World Championships: Gold medal - 2003
- European Championship: Silver medal - 1995; Bronze medal - 2001, 2008
- FINA World League: Gold medal - 2003, 2004
- Junior World Championships: (Gold medal - 1995; Bronze medal - 1993)
- Junior European Championship: (Gold medal - 1994)

=== Club ===
- LEN Cup Winners (2): (2009 - with Szeged; 2010 - with Akademija Cattaro)
- Hungarian Cup (Magyar Kupa): 3x (1996 (1), 2001, 2002 - with Vasas)

== Awards ==
- Masterly youth athlete: 1994, 1995
- Member of the Hungarian team of year: 2003, 2004, 2008
- Ministerial Certificate of Merit (2012)

Orders

- Officer's Cross of the Order of Merit of the Republic of Hungary (2004)
- Commander's Cross of the Order of Merit of the Republic of Hungary (2008)

== See also ==
- Hungary men's Olympic water polo team records and statistics
- List of Olympic champions in men's water polo
- List of Olympic medalists in water polo (men)
- List of world champions in men's water polo
- List of World Aquatics Championships medalists in water polo
