= Gábor Nemes =

Hungarian water polo player (born 1964)

Personal information
- Nationality: Hungarian
- Born: 30 November 1964 (age 61) Budapest, Hungary

Sport
- Sport: Water polo
Medal record
Representing Hungary
World Championships
Bronze medal – third place	1991 Perth	Team competition
European Championships
Silver medal – second place	1993 Sheffield	Team competition

Gábor Nemes (born 30 November 1964) is a Hungarian water polo player. His team placed sixth in the men's tournament at the 1992 Summer Olympics.

== See also ==
- Hungary men's Olympic water polo team records and statistics
- List of men's Olympic water polo tournament goalkeepers
- List of World Aquatics Championships medalists in water polo
