= Ervin Zádor =

Hungarian water polo player (1934-2012)

Personal information
- Born: June 7, 1934 Budapest, Hungary
- Died: April 28, 2012 (aged 77) Linden, California, United States

Sport
- Sport: Water polo
Medal record
Representing Hungary
Olympic Games
Gold medal – first place	1956 Melbourne	Team competition

Ervin Zádor (7 June 1934 – 28 April 2012) was a Hungarian water polo player and member of the Hungarian national team.

== Career ==
At age 21, Ervin Zádor represented Hungary at the 1956 Summer Olympics in Melbourne. He played four matches and scored five goals.

The Soviet Union and Hungary water polo teams met in the semifinals at the Olympics. Because of the Soviet Union's invasion of Hungary a month earlier and the resulting tension between the teams, the game was expected to be very physical. In a match marred by many penalties on both sides, Zádor scored twice as Hungary took a 4-0 lead. Late in the game, Valentin Prokopov struck Zádor in the face, opening a cut under his right eye. Zádor's injury and multiple other combats resulted in it being known as the "Blood In The Water" game. The match was stopped in the final minute to quell fighting among spectators, many of them from Melbourne's large Hungarian community, who were furious over the Soviet invasion of their homeland.

Zádor was shown emerging from the water with blood pouring down his face in a news photo published around the world. He later commented "All I could think about is, 'Could I play the next match?'." Zádor's injury kept him out of the Olympic final, but his team won the Olympic gold medal with a 2-1 victory over Yugoslavia.

In April 2006, a documentary called Freedom's Fury premiered, with Lucy Liu and Quentin Tarantino listed as executive producers. It depicts the Hungarian Revolution of 1956 and climaxes with the water polo battle between Hungary and the Soviet Union. The documentary follows Ervin Zádor, who is portrayed as the unwitting focal point of the politicized match. In a 2006 interview, Zádor said the Hungarian strategy was to anger the Russian team and cause them to make errors. U.S. Olympic swimmer Mark Spitz, who narrates the film, was coached by Ervin Zádor.

== Personal life ==
Born in Budapest, Zádor refused to return to his Soviet-occupied country after the Olympic Games and became a political refugee. He settled in Linden, California. He died on April 28, 2012. Two of his children continue to coach water polo in Ripon, California.

== See also ==
- Hungary men's Olympic water polo team records and statistics
- List of Olympic champions in men's water polo
- List of Olympic medalists in water polo (men)
- Blood in the Water match
