= György Kárpáti =

Hungarian water polo player (1935–2020)

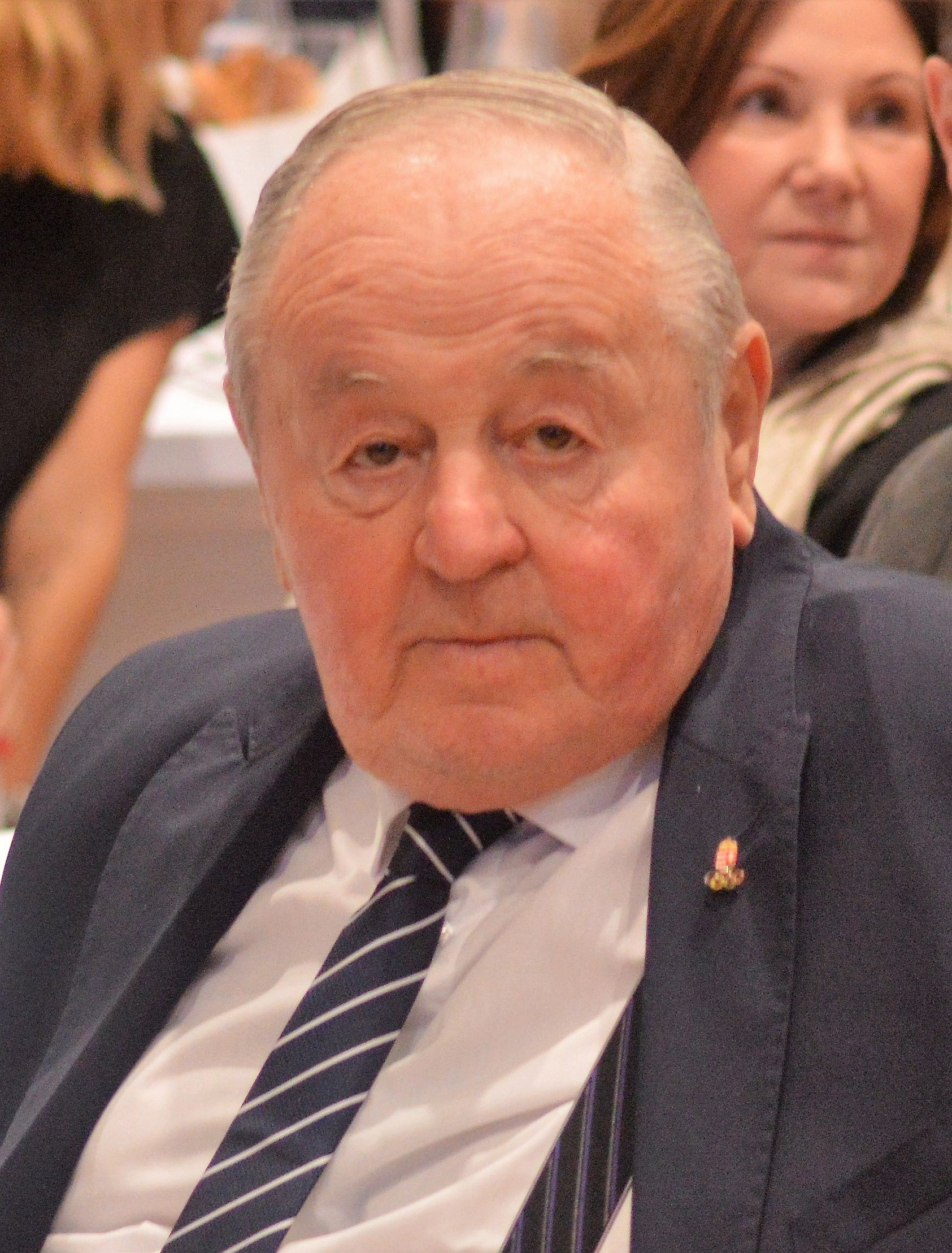
- Kárpáti in 2014

Personal information
- Born: 23 June 1935 Budapest, Hungary
- Died: 17 June 2020 (aged 84) Budapest, Hungary
- Height: 167 cm (5 ft 6 in)
- Weight: 71 kg (157 lb)

Sport
- Sport: Water polo
- Club: Budapesti Kinizsi; Ferencvárosi Torna Club
Medal record
Men's Water Polo
Representing Hungary
Olympic Games
Gold medal – first place	1952 Helsinki	Team competition
Gold medal – first place	1956 Melbourne	Team competition
Bronze medal – third place	1960 Rome	Team competition
Gold medal – first place	1964 Tokyo	Team competition

György Kárpáti (23 June 1935 – 17 June 2020) was a Hungarian water polo player who competed at the 1952 Summer Olympics, 1956 Summer Olympics, 1960 Summer Olympics, and 1964 Summer Olympics. He is one of 12 male athletes who won four or more Olympic medals in water polo, and one of 13 male athletes who won three Olympic gold medals in water polo.

== Career ==
Kárpáti was born in Budapest, and was a member of the Hungarian team which won the gold medal in the 1952 tournament. He played five matches and scored four goals.

Four years later he was a member of the Hungarian team which won again the gold medal in the 1956 Olympic tournament. He played six matches and scored at least six goals (not all scorers are known).

At the 1960 Games he won the bronze medal with the Hungarian team. He played four matches and scored five goals.

His last Olympic tournament was in Tokyo 1964 where he won his third gold medal. He played six matches and scored four goals for the Hungarian team.

Kárpáti studied and gained a degree in law, but he never practised it, he also got a degree in coaching in 1964, which he used when he was assistant coach to Dezső Gyarmati for the national team between 1970-80. Their main success was winning the gold medal at the 1976 Summer Olympics.

In 1982, Kárpáti was elected in to the International Swimming Hall of Fame, and from 1994 he became a member of the Association of Immortal Hungarian Athletes.

== Death ==
After a long illness Kárpáti died on 17 June 2020, aged 84 years. He was buried in the Farkasréti Cemetery on 2 July 2020.

== Personal life ==
György was born Jewish. He was a great friend of the former water polo player and distinguished Italian actor Bud Spencer.

== See also ==
- Hungary men's Olympic water polo team records and statistics
- List of multiple Olympic medalists in one event
- List of multiple Olympic gold medalists in one event
- List of Olympic champions in men's water polo
- List of Olympic medalists in water polo (men)
- List of players who have appeared in multiple men's Olympic water polo tournaments
- List of members of the International Swimming Hall of Fame
- List of select Jewish water polo players
- Blood in the Water match
