= Olivér Halassy =

Hungarian water polo player

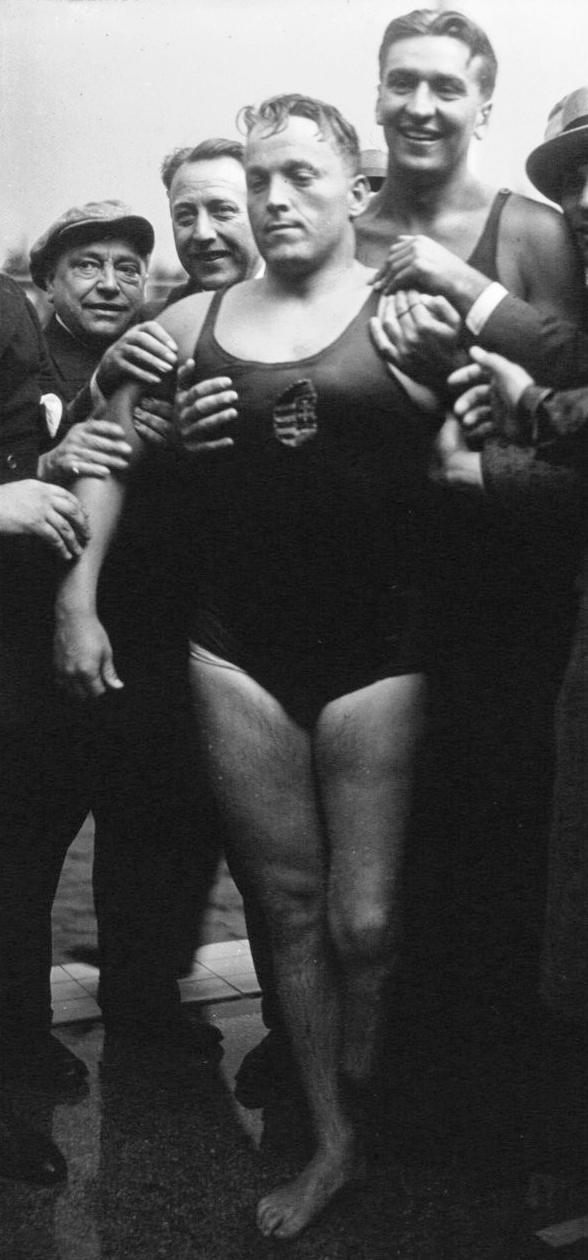
- Halassy at the 1931 European Championships

Personal information
- Full name: Olivér Halassy
- Born: 31 July 1909 Újpest, Kingdom of Hungary, Austria-Hungary
- Died: 10 September 1946 (aged 37) Budapest, Hungary

Sport
- Sport: Swimming
- Strokes: Freestyle
- Club: Újpesti TE
Medal record
Men's water polo
Representing Hungary
Olympic Games
Gold medal – first place	1932 Los Angeles	Team competition
Gold medal – first place	1936 Berlin	Team competition
Silver medal – second place	1928 Amsterdam	Team competition
European Championships
Gold medal – first place	1931 Paris	Team
Gold medal – first place	1934 Magdeburg	Team
Gold medal – first place	1938 London	Team
Men's swimming
Representing Hungary
European Championships
Gold medal – first place	1931 Paris	1500 m freestyle

Olivér Halassy (Note: He is also known as Oliver von Halassy or as Oliver Haltmayer) (né Haltmayer; 31 July 1909 – 10 September 1946) was a Hungarian water polo player and freestyle swimmer who competed at the 1928, 1932 and 1936 Summer Olympics.

== Life ==
Halassy lost his left leg below the knee when he was hit by a train at the age of 11. He later became the first amputee swimmer to compete in the Olympics. He was a member of the Hungarian water polo teams that won one silver and two gold medals in 1928, 1932 and 1936. He played all matches and scored three, eleven, and six goals, respectively.

Halassy won three European water polo titles, in 1931, 1934, and 1938. He also became European champion in 1500 metres freestyle swimming in 1931, a few hours after he helped his water polo team to victory. Nationally he won 25 swimming titles and set 12 records.

Due to his disability, Halassy was exempted from military service during World War II. After retiring from competitions, he worked as an auditor at City Hall.

=== Death ===
He was killed by a Soviet soldier near his home in Budapest, in what Hungarian sources called "tragic circumstances." Other accounts indicate that he was coming home by taxi late at night when he was murdered by occupying Soviet soldiers in a robbery or mugging. His death came just days before his wife gave birth to their third child.

== Legacy ==
Halassy was inducted into the International Swimming Hall of Fame in 1978.

== See also ==
- Hungary men's Olympic water polo team records and statistics
- List of Olympic champions in men's water polo
- List of Olympic medalists in water polo (men)
- List of members of the International Swimming Hall of Fame
