= Colin Keith Gray =

Canadian actor, writer and film director

- Born: Ann Arbor, Michigan
- Other names: Colin K. Gray, Colin Gray
- Education: University of Michigan
- Occupations: Actor, writer, director
- Years active: 1993–present
- Known for: The Hardy Boys; Freedom's Fury
- Relatives: Megan Raney Aarons (sister)
- Website: www.gpixer.com

Colin Keith Gray is a Canadian actor, writer and film director. He played Frank Hardy on the TV show The Hardy Boys for thirteen episodes. He is known for directing the documentary film Freedom's Fury.

== Early life ==
Gray was born in Ann Arbor, Michigan before his family moved to Ottawa, Ontario.

He played water polo, the sport of his future film Freedom's Fury, for Lisgar Collegiate Institute. Gray also performed in various productions by the Orpheus Musical Theatre Society and at the Ottawa Little Theatre.

After high school, he moved backed to the United States and graduated with degrees in political science and French literature from the University of Michigan, while his sister, Megan Raney Aarons, relocated with his mother to the United Kingdom.

== Career ==
After graduating from Michigan, Gray moved to New York City where he earned a role in the Broadway production of Buddy: The Buddy Holly Story.

In 1995, Gray moved to Toronto to perform as Frank Hardy alongside Paul Popowich as Joe Hardy, the eponymous brothers in the 1995 production of The Hardy Boys. The show only lasted for one season of thirteen episodes due to poor ratings.

After the show ended, Gray moved to Los Angeles and earned small roles in television shows including Saved by the Bell: The New Class before switching to writing and directing, and establishing WOLO Entertainment with a friend.

Gray and his sister Megan, working in partnership as "The Sibs", wrote and directed Freedom's Fury, a 2006 documentary film about the clash between Hungary and the Soviet Union in the "Blood in the Water match", the water polo semifinal of the 1956 Summer Olympics during the Hungarian Revolution of 1956. Gray's Michigan co-alumnus Lucy Liu, while working on Kill Bill, helped them enlist Quentin Tarantino as co-executive producer with Liu in 2001. The Canadian premiere earned The Sibs congratulations in the House of Commons of Canada via a private member's statement made by Andrew Telegdi. In the year of the film's release, Gray and Aarons were granted Hungary's highest civilian honour, the Knight's Cross Order of Merit of the Republic of Hungary.

Gray and his sister now manage GRAiNEY Productions which has undertaken projects including Game Day! College Football to the Max, an IMAX 3D film about college football with Seattle Seahawks head coach Pete Carroll serving as executive producer, as well as Redlight a documentary with Lucy Liu about child sex trafficking that features Nobel Peace Prize nominees Mu Sochua and Somaly Mam.

== Filmography ==
Year	Title	Role	Notes
1993	Secret Service	Spencer	Episode "Something for Nothing/The Amateur" (1.12)
1994	Saved by the Bell: The New Class	Ski Patrolman	Episode "Drinking 101" (2.20)
1995	Too Something	Male Friend #1	Episode "Pretend You Know Me" (1.22)
1995	The Hardy Boys	Frank Hardy	13 episodes
1996	JAG	Lieutenant Teese	Episode "The Brotherhood" (1.12)
1997	Living Single	Terrell	Episode "Swing Out Sisters" (4.18)
1999	The West Wing	Reporter	3 episodes
