= Ferenc Keserű =

Hungarian water polo player

Personal information
- Born: August 27, 1903 Budapest, Austria-Hungary
- Died: July 16, 1968 (aged 64) Budapest, Hungary

Sport
- Sport: Water polo
Medal record
Representing Hungary
Olympic Games
Gold medal – first place	1932 Los Angeles	Team competition
Silver medal – second place	1928 Amsterdam	Team competition

Ferenc Keserű (27 August 1903 – 16 July 1968) was a Hungarian water polo player who competed at the 1924, 1928, and 1932 Summer Olympics. Born in Budapest, he first competed at the Olympics in 1924. As a member of the Hungarian water polo team he finished seventh. He played all four matches.

He was also a part of the Hungarian water polo team which won the silver medal in 1928 and the gold medal in 1932. At the 1928 Summer Olympics in Amsterdam he played all four matches and scored four goals. Four years later in Los Angeles he played two matches. He died in Budapest.

== See also ==
- Hungary men's Olympic water polo team records and statistics
- List of Olympic champions in men's water polo
- List of Olympic medalists in water polo (men)
