= György Kutasi =

Hungarian water polo player (1910–1977)

Personal information
- Born: September 16, 1910 Fiume, Austria-Hungary
- Died: June 29, 1977 (aged 66) Melbourne, Australia

Sport
- Sport: Water polo
Medal record
Representing Hungary
Olympic Games
Gold medal – first place	1936 Berlin	Team competition

György Kutasi (September 16, 1910 – June 29, 1977) was a Hungarian water polo player who competed in the 1936 Summer Olympics.

He was part of the Hungarian team which won the gold medal. He played one match as goalkeeper.

== See also ==
- Hungary men's Olympic water polo team records and statistics
- List of Olympic champions in men's water polo
- List of Olympic medalists in water polo (men)
- List of men's Olympic water polo tournament goalkeepers
