= Freedom's Fury =

- Directed by: Colin Keith Gray; Megan Raney Aarons
- Written by: Colin Keith Gray; Megan Raney Aarons
- Produced by: Kristine Lacey; Lucy Liu; Thor Halvorssen; Amy Sommer; Andrew G. Vajna
- Narrated by: Mark Spitz
- Music by: Les Hall
- Production companies: Wolo Entertainment; Cinergi Pictures Entertainment
- Release date: 2006
- Running time: 90 min
- Country: United States
- Languages: English, Hungarian with English subtitles

Freedom's Fury is a documentary film about the semifinal water polo match between Hungary and the USSR at the 1956 Summer Olympics in Melbourne, Australia. The match took place against the background of the Hungarian Revolution, that was brutally crushed by the Soviet army, and it quickly turned into a violent battle, with contemporaries dubbing it the "Blood in the Water match."

The documentary was written and directed by Colin Keith Gray and Megan Raney Aarons, the brother and sister duo better known as "The Sibs". Gray's Michigan co-alumnus Lucy Liu, while working on Kill Bill, helped them enlist Quentin Tarantino as co-executive producer with Liu in 2001.

Freedom's Fury was produced by Kristine Lacey, executive produced by Quentin Tarantino, Lucy Liu, Amy Sommer, and Andrew G. Vajna, and co-produced by Thor Halvorssen. Narration was provided by Olympic gold medalist Mark Spitz, who as a teenager had been coached by Ervin Zádor.

The film debuted at the Tribeca Film Festival in 2006, in the year of the 50th anniversary of the match.

== History ==
Near the close of World War II in 1945, Hungary was liberated from the Nazis by the forces of the Soviet Union. While there was initial jubilation amongst the people of Hungary, they soon found that they had only exchanged one totalitarian regime for another. As Hungarian educator Karoly Nagy puts it in the film, "yes, we were liberated from one devastating, dictatorial, extremist, horrible creature called Nazis [clears throat], but, during that course, a lot of people were also liberated from all their belongings, they were liberated from their rights, they were liberated from their freedom and life, women were liberated from their honor ..."

By 1956 (the year of the Melbourne Summer Olympics), Hungarian tensions with the satellite government installed by the Soviet Union had risen to the point of mass uprising and, eventually, outright revolution. The film documents the meeting (and subsequent battle) between the representatives of these two rival nations, and in a larger sense, became a globally televised embodiment of the Hungarian people's fight for independence under the communist regime.

== Content ==
The documentary tells the story of the young star of the Hungarian Olympic waterpolo team, Ervin Zádor, who finds himself the unwitting focal point of one of the most politicized sports matches ever played, popularly known as the "Blood in the Water" match.

The journey of Zádor and the Hungarian waterpolo team to the 1956 Summer Olympics in Melbourne becomes the film's through-line as "Freedom's Fury" explores the larger human tragedy of the Hungarian Revolution of 1956.

As the revolution rages in the city below, the team is on an isolated mountaintop training camp near Budapest, and doesn't learn the details of the savage crushing of the revolt and brutalization of Hungarian citizens by Soviet forces until they land in Melbourne. The animosity they feel towards the Soviet occupiers for the atrocities they committed is transferred to the Soviet players.

After the match, Zádor and half his teammates decide to defect rather than return to the oppression in their homeland.

In the final act, the documentary also touches on how the Hungarian Revolution become a symbol of freedom and impacted the collapse of communism in 1989.

=== Filmmaker commentary ===
The making of the film allowed for the reconnection of the surviving members of both teams nearly fifty years after the bloody match, this time under very different circumstances. Writer and director Colin Gray said of the men:

Both teams were as much a victim of the circumstances and really both countries were imprisoned by the same ideology - and these guys were able to finally reconnect as human beings and as fellow athletes ... That was something that we really wanted to highlight, the sort of humanistic side to counter the sort of oppression of ideology that everyone had suffered under in the Eastern bloc.

Quentin Tarantino described the film as "the best untold story ever"; he also was a co-executive producer with Lucy Liu and Andy Vajna for the film.

== Release and reception ==
The film received positive reviews, and was praised for its intriguing look at a very important, yet under-told story of international importance.

The Canadian premiere earned "The Sibs" congratulations in the House of Commons of Canada via a private member's statement made by Andrew Telegdi. In the year of the film's release, Gray and Aarons were granted Hungary's highest civilian honour, the Knight's Cross Order of Merit of the Republic of Hungary.

=== Festivals ===
Freedom's Fury was screened at the following festivals:

- Hungarian Film Week 2006
- Global Peace Festival 2006
- Waterfront Film Festival 2006
- Bahama Film Festival 2006
- Cinequest 2006
- Tribeca Film Festival 2006
