= István Szívós (water polo, born 1948) =

Hungarian water polo player (1948–2019)

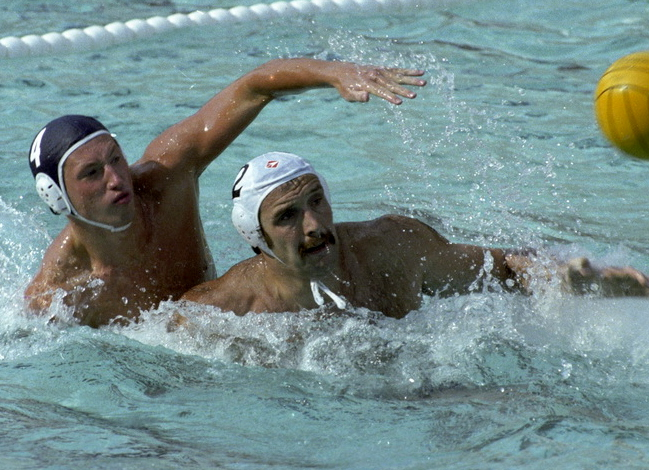
- Szívós (right) at the 1980 Olympics

Personal information
- Full name: István Antal Szívós
- Born: 24 April 1948 Budapest, Hungary
- Died: 10 November 2019 (aged 71) Budapest, Hungary
- Height: 202 cm (6 ft 8 in)
- Weight: 106 kg (234 lb)

Sport
- Sport: Water polo
- Club: Ferencvárosi TC; OSC
Medal record
Representing Hungary
Olympic Games
Bronze medal – third place	1968 Mexico City	Team
Silver medal – second place	1972 Munich	Team
Gold medal – first place	1976 Montreal	Team
Bronze medal – third place	1980 Moscow	Team
World Championships
Gold medal – first place	1973 Belgrade	Team
Silver medal – second place	1975 Cali	Team
Silver medal – second place	1978 Berlin	Team
European Water Polo Championship
Silver medal – second place	1970 Barcelona	Team
Gold medal – first place	1974 Vienna	Team
Gold medal – first place	1977 Jönköping	Team

István Antal Szívós, also known as István Szívós Jr. (Hungarian: ifj. Szívós István, 24 April 1948 – 10 November 2019) was a Hungarian water polo player. He competed in four consecutive Olympics in 1968–1980 and won a medal in each of them, becoming one of eight male athletes who won four or more Olympic medals in water polo. He also won six gold or silver medals at world and European championships and nine national titles. Between 1966 and 1980 he played 308 international matches for Hungary. In 1996 he was inducted to the International Swimming Hall of Fame, one year earlier than his father István Sr., who won Olympic gold medals in water polo in 1952 and 1956.

Szívós graduated from the Medical University in Budapest, where he later worked as a dentist. After retiring from competitions in 1980 he also became a water polo coach and president of Ferencvárosi TC, and served as a board member of the Hungarian Water Polo Federation.

== Personal life ==
His son Márton is also world champion and his father István was also Olympic champion in water polo. He died 10 November 2019 at the age of 71.

== See also ==
- Hungary men's Olympic water polo team records and statistics
- List of multiple Olympic medalists in one event
- List of Olympic champions in men's water polo
- List of Olympic medalists in water polo (men)
- List of players who have appeared in multiple men's Olympic water polo tournaments
- List of world champions in men's water polo
- List of World Aquatics Championships medalists in water polo
- List of members of the International Swimming Hall of Fame
