= György Bródy =

Hungarian water polo player (1908–1967)

- György Bródy, 1932, cropped

Personal information
- Nationality: Hungarian
- Born: 21 July 1908 Budapest, Austria-Hungary
- Died: 5 August 1967 (aged 59) Johannesburg, South Africa

Sport
- Sport: Water polo
Medal record
Men's water polo
Representing Hungary
Water Polo
Gold medal – first place	1932 Los Angeles	Team competition
Gold medal – first place	1936 Berlin	Team competition

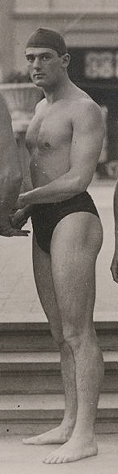
Brody cropped from 1932 Hungarian Team photo

György Bródy (21 July 1908 – 5 August 1967) was a Hungarian water polo player.

== Career ==
At the 1928 Summer Olympics he was a reserve player for the Hungarian water polo team, but did not compete in a match of the tournament.

In 1932, he was part of the Hungarian team that won the gold medal, playing two matches in the critical role of goalkeeper.

Four years later, in 1936, he won the gold medal again with the Hungarian team at the Berlin Games. Playing a major role, he tended goal in six matches. He was one of only around nine Jewish athletes who won medals at the Nazi Germany-hosted Olympics, with the number including four Hungarians.

Bródy died on 5 August 1967 in Johannesburg, South Africa.

== See also ==
- Hungary men's Olympic water polo team records and statistics
- List of Olympic champions in men's water polo
- List of Olympic medalists in water polo (men)
- List of men's Olympic water polo tournament goalkeepers
- List of select Jewish water polo players
