= Alajos Keserű =

Hungarian water polo player (1905–1965)

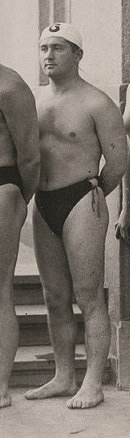
- Olympic gold medalist Hungarian water polo team (1932, Los Angeles) - Alajos Keserű

Personal information
- Born: 8 March 1905 Budapest, Hungary
- Died: 3 May 1965 (aged 60) Budapest, Hungary
Medal record
Men's water polo
Representing Hungary
Olympic Games
Gold medal – first place	1932 Los Angeles	Team competition
Silver medal – second place	1928 Amsterdam	Team competition

Alajos Keserű (8 March 1905 – 3 May 1965) was a Hungarian water polo player who competed in the 1924 Summer Olympics, in the 1928 Summer Olympics, and in the 1932 Summer Olympics.

Born in Budapest, he first competed at the Olympics in 1924. As a member of the Hungarian water polo team he finished seventh. He played all four matches and scored one goal.

Also he was part of the Hungarian water polo team which won the silver medal in 1928 and the gold medal 1936. In Amsterdam at the 1928 Summer Olympics he played all four matches and was the top scorer of the tournament with ten goals. Four years later in Los Angeles he played one match. He died in Budapest.

== See also ==
- Hungary men's Olympic water polo team records and statistics
- List of Olympic champions in men's water polo
- List of Olympic medalists in water polo (men)
