= Blood in the Water match =

Water polo match between Hungary and the USSR in 1956

The "Blood in the Water" match (Hungarian: melbourne-i vérfürdő lit. Blood bath of Melbourne; Russian: Кровь в бассейне, romanized: Krov' v basseyne, lit. 'Blood in the swimming pool') was a water polo match between Hungary and the USSR at the 1956 Melbourne Olympics. The semi-final match took place on 6 December 1956 against the background of the recent Hungarian Revolution, and saw Hungary defeat the USSR 4–0. The name was coined after Hungarian player Ervin Zádor emerged during the last two minutes with blood pouring from above his eye after being punched by Soviet player Valentin Prokopov.

Tensions were at an all-time high between the competing teams; the Soviet armed forces had violently suppressed the Hungarian Revolution just weeks before. Most of the Revolutionaries consisted of civilians, a majority factory workers and students, who constructed Molotov cocktails against the formal armed forces of the USSR. Throughout the match, players would use any form of violence they could manage whenever the players of opposing teams came in contact. Zador’s injury occurred in the closing minutes of the match. Chaos ensued with the crowd booing the Soviets.

== Background ==
Tensions were already high between the Hungarian and Soviet water polo teams, as the Soviets had taken advantage of their political control of Hungary to study and copy the training methods and tactics of the Olympic champion Hungarians.

Then, on 23 October 1956, a demonstration by students of the Budapest University of Technology and Economics escalated into an uprising against the government in Budapest. On 1 November, Soviet tanks started rolling into Hungary and from 4 to 10 November forces began suppressing the uprising with air strikes, artillery bombardments, and tank-infantry actions.

At the time, the Hungarian water polo team was in a mountain training camp above Budapest. They were able to hear the gunfire and see smoke rising. The players were the defending Olympic champions; with the Summer Olympics in Melbourne two months away, they were moved into Czechoslovakia to avoid being caught in the revolution. The players only learned of the true extent of the uprising and the subsequent crackdown after arriving in Australia and they were all anxious for news of friends and family.

By the start of the Olympics, the uprising had been suppressed and many players saw the Olympics as a way to salvage pride for their country. "We felt we were playing not just for ourselves but for our whole country", said Zádor after the match. The match was played in front of a partisan crowd bolstered with expatriate Hungarians as well as Australians and Americans, two of the Soviet Union's Cold War opponents.

== The match ==
6 December 1956	Soviet Union	0–4	Hungary	Melbourne Sports and Entertainment Centre

A whistle came, I looked at the referee, I said 'What's the whistle for?' And the moment I did that, I knew I'd made a horrible mistake. I turned back and with a straight arm, he just smacked me in the face. He tried to punch me out. I saw about 4,000 stars. And I reached to my face and I felt warm blood pouring down. And I instantly said, 'Oh my God, I won't be able to play the next game.'

— Ervin Zádor

The Hungarians had created a strategy before the game to taunt the Soviets, whose language they had studied in school. In the words of Ervin Zádor: "We had decided to try and make the Russians angry to distract them."

From the beginning, kicks and punches were exchanged. At one point, a punch thrown by Hungarian captain Dezső Gyarmati was caught on film. Meanwhile, Zádor scored two goals to the crowd's cheers of Hajrá Magyarok! ("Go Hungarians!").

With one minute remaining in the match, Hungary was leading 4–0. Zádor was marking Valentin Prokopov, with whom he had already exchanged words, and a whistle was blown. In the intermission, Prokopov struck him, causing a bleeding gash. Zádor left the pool; his bleeding was the final straw for a crowd already in a frenzy. Many angry spectators jumped onto the concourse beside the water, shook their fists, shouted abuse and spat at the Russians. To avoid a riot, police entered the arena and shepherded the crowd away.

External images
- Ervin Zádor leaving the pool with a cut eye (National Library of Australia).
- First-aid officer escorting Ervin Zádor to the medical room for treatment of his cut eye (National Library of Australia).
- Ervin Zádor in the medical room, receiving treatment, protected by a police officer (National Library of Australia)
- Ervin Zádor’s cut eye (Public Record Office Victoria)
- Ervin Zádor’s cut eye (Public Record Office Victoria)
- Spectators invading the concourse (Public Record Office Victoria)
- Spectators invading the concourse (Public Record Office Victoria)
- Spectators invading the concourse (Public Record Office Victoria)
- Spectators invading the concourse (Public Record Office Victoria)

Pictures of Zádor's injuries were then published by newspapers, leading to the "Blood in the Water" moniker. Reports that the water in the pool turned red were, however, an exaggeration. Zádor said his only thought was whether he would be able to play the next match.

The referees stopped the match; Hungary was declared the winner since they had been leading. Hungary then beat Yugoslavia 2–1 in the final to win their fourth Olympic gold medal. Zádor's injury forced him to miss the match. After the event was completed, he and some of his teammates defected to the West.

== In film ==
In 2006, for the 50th anniversary of the attempted Hungarian Revolution, the documentary Freedom's Fury, produced by Kristine Lacey and Thor Halvorssen, told the story of the match. Quentin Tarantino described it as "the best untold story ever". The documentary was narrated by the Olympic swimmer Mark Spitz, who, as a teenager, had been coached by Ervin Zádor.

Also in 2006, a feature film about the match was released, entitled Children of Glory (Hungarian title: Szabadság, szerelem, meaning "Freedom, love", after the lines of Sándor Petőfi, the martyred poet of the 1848–49 revolution). The movie shows the Hungarian Revolution through the eyes of a player on the water polo team and a young woman who is one of the student leaders. It was directed by Krisztina Goda, and produced by Andrew G. Vajna. The movie appeared in Hungarian cinemas on 23 October 2006, the 50th anniversary of the revolution. On 29 October 2006, it was shown at the White House for President George W. Bush and guests (including Hungarian-American figures such as George Pataki, Governor of New York, and George A. Olah, Nobel Prize winner).

The incident is also featured in the 1978 Australian film Newsfront.
