= Water polo at the 1964 Summer Olympics – Men's team squads =

The following is the list of squads that took part in the men's water polo tournament at the 1964 Summer Olympics.

- CF=Centre Forward
- CB=Centre Back
- D=Defender
- GK=Goalkeeper

== Australia ==
The following players represented Australia.

- Michael Withers
- Tom Hoad
- Ian Mills
- Ted Peirce
- Nicky Barnes
- Leon Wiegard
- Les Nunn
- Stan Hammond
- Bill McAtee
- Graeme Samuel
- William Phillips

== Belgium ==
The following players represented Belgium.

- Jacques Caufrier
- Bruno De Hesselle
- Karel De Vis
- Roger De Wilde
- Frank D'Osterlinck
- Nicolas Dumont
- André Laurent
- Léon Pickers
- Joseph Stappers
- Johan Van Den Steen

== Brazil ==
The following players represented Brazil.

- Rodney Bell
- Ivo Carotini
- Paulo Carotini
- Osvaldo Cochrane Filho
- Luiz Daniel
- Márvio dos Santos
- João Gonçalves Filho
- Adhemar Grijó Filho
- Ney Nogueira
- Pedro Pinciroli Júnior
- Aladar Szabo

== Egypt ==
The following players represented Egypt.

- Mohamed Khalil
- Mohamed Abid Soliman
- Moukhtar Hussain El-Gamal
- Amin Abdel Rahman
- Sami El-Sayed
- Hazem Kourched
- Ashraf Gamil
- Adel El-Moalem
- Mamadou Amir

== Hungary ==
The following players represented Hungary.

- Miklós Ambrus
- László Felkai
- János Konrád
- Zoltán Dömötör
- Tivadar Kanizsa
- Péter Rusorán
- György Kárpáti
- Mihály Mayer
- Dezső Gyarmati
- Dénes Pócsik
- András Bodnár
- Ottó Boros

== Italy ==
The following players represented Italy.

- Dante Rossi
- Giuseppe D'Altrui
- Eraldo Pizzo
- Gianni Lonzi
- Franco Lavoratori
- Rosario Parmegiani
- Mario Cevasco
- Eugenio Merello
- Alberto Spinola
- Danio Bardi
- Giancarlo Guerrini
- Fritz Dennerlein

== Japan ==
The following players represented Japan.

- Mineo Kato
- Hachiro Arakawa
- Takashi Yokoyama
- Kazuya Takeuchi
- Yoji Shimizu
- Shigenobu Fujimoto
- Koki Takagi
- Keisuke Satsuki

== Netherlands ==
The following players represented the Netherlands.

- Henk Hermsen
- Bram Leenards
- Wim van Spingelen
- Gerrit Wormgoor
- Fred van Dorp
- Harry Vriend
- Nico van der Voet
- Wim Vriend
- Hans Muller
- Jan Bultman
- Ben Kniest

== Romania ==
The following players represented Romania.

- Mircea Ştefănescu
- Anatol Grinţescu
- Alexandru Szabo
- Ştefan Kroner
- Nicolae Firoiu
- Gruia Novac
- Cornel Mărculescu
- Emil Mureşan
- Aurel Zahan
- Iosif Culineac

== Soviet Union ==
The Soviet Union entered a squad of eleven players. They scored 15 goals.

Head coach: Andrey Kistyakovsky and Evgeny Semenov

No.	Pos.	Player	DoB	Age	Caps	Club	Tournament games	Tournament goals
1	GK	Igor Grabovsky	2 September 1941	23	?		6	0
2		Vladimir Kuznetsov	30 June 1937	27	?		6	2
3		Boris Grishin	4 January 1938	26	?		6	1
4		Boris Popov	21 March 1941	23	?		6	0
5		Nikolay Kalashnikov	11 October 1940	24	?		6	2
6		Zenon Bortkevich	29 May 1937	27	?		6	2
7		Nikolay Kuznetsov	25 April 1931	33	?		6	1
8		Vladimir Semyonov	10 May 1938	26	?		6	4
9		Viktor Ageev	29 April 1936	28	?		6	2
10		Leonid Osipov	6 February 1943	21	?		6	1
11	GK	Eduard Egorov	7 January 1940	24	?		2	0

== United States ==
The following players represented the United States.

- Tony van Dorp
- Ron Crawford
- Dave Ashleigh
- Ned McIlroy
- Charles McIlroy
- Stan Cole
- Bob Saari
- Dan Drown
- Ralph Whitney
- George Stransky

== United Team of Germany ==
The following players represented the United Team of Germany.

- Peter Schmidt
- Hubert Höhne
- Siegfried Ballerstedt
- Edgar Thiele
- Klaus Schulze
- Jürgen Thiel
- Klaus Schlenkrich
- Heinz Mäder
- Dieter Vohs
- Jürgen Kluge
- Heinz Wittig

== Yugoslavia ==
The following players represented Yugoslavia.

- Milan Muškatirović
- Ivo Trumbić
- Vinko Rosić
- Zlatko Šimenc
- Božidar Stanišić
- Ante Nardeli
- Zoran Janković
- Mirko Sandić
- Frane Nonković
- Ozren Bonačić
- Karlo Stipanić
