= Belgium at the 1964 Summer Olympics =

- IOC code: BEL
- NOC: Belgian Olympic Committee

in Tokyo
- Competitors: 61 (60 men, 1 woman) in 13 sports
- Flag bearer: Gaston Roelants
- Medals Ranked 20th: Gold 2 Silver 0 Bronze 1 Total 3

Summer Olympics appearances (overview)
- 1900; 1904; 1908; 1912; 1920; 1924; 1928; 1932; 1936; 1948; 1952; 1956; 1960; 1964; 1968; 1972; 1976; 1980; 1984; 1988; 1992; 1996; 2000; 2004; 2008; 2012; 2016; 2020; 2024

Other related appearances
- 1906 Intercalated Games

Belgium competed at the 1964 Summer Olympics in Tokyo, Japan. 61 competitors, 60 men and 1 woman, took part in 36 events in 13 sports.

== Medalists ==
=== Gold ===
- Gaston Roelants — Athletics, Men's 3,000 m Steeplechase
- Patrick Sercu — Cycling, Men's 1,000 m Time Trial

=== Bronze ===
- Walter Godefroot — Cycling, Men's Individual Road Race

== Athletics ==
10 athletes competed for Belgium.

- 400 metres - Jacques Pennewaert (8th place in heat 4, round 1)
- 800 metres - Jacques Pennewaert (8th place); Jos Lambrechts (8th place in heat 3, round 2); Paul Roekaerts (6th place in heat 6, round 1)
- 1500 metres - Eugène Allonsius (6th place in heat 2, round 2)
- 5000 metres - Eugène Allonsius (6th place in heat 2, round 1); Henri Clerckx (10th place in heat 4, round 1);Gaston Roelants (did not start)
- 10,000 metres - Henri Clerckx (12th place); Gaston Roelants (did not start)
- Marathon - Aurèle Vandendriessche (7th place)
- 110 metres hurdles - Leo Mariën (4th place in heat 4, round 1)
- 400 metres hurdles - Wilfried Geeroms (8th place)
- 3000 metres steeplechase - Gaston Roelants (1st place) Gold Medal
- Pole vault - Paul Coppejans (27th place, round 1)

== Canoeing ==
Two canoeists represented Belgium.

- Kayak singles, 1000 metres- René Roels (did not start)
- Kayak doubles, 1000 metres - René Roels, Rik Verbrugghe (4th place in heat 3, round 3)

== Cycling ==
Ten cyclists represented Belgium in 1964.

Individual road race

- Walter Godefroot Bronze Medal
- Eddy Merckx
- Roger Swerts
- Jozef Boons

Team time trial

- Leopold Heuvelmans
- Roland de Neve
- Roland Van De Rijse
- Albert Van Vlierberghe

Sprint

- Patrick Sercu

1000m time trial

- Patrick Sercu Gold Medal

Individual pursuit

- Herman Van Loo

Team pursuit

- Leopold Heuvelmans
- Roland de Neve
- Roland Van De Rijse
- Albert Van Vlierberghe

== Fencing ==
Two fencers, both men, represented Belgium in 1964.

Men's épée

- René Van Den Driessche

Men's sabre

- Yves Brasseur

== Gymnastics ==
One woman gymnast competed for Belgium.

- Individual all-around - Veronica Grymonprez (45th place)
- Balance beam - Veronica Grymonprez (=49th place)
- Floor exercise - Veronica Grymonprez (=43rd place)
- Uneven bars - Veronica Grymonprez (53rd place)
- Vault - Veronica Grymonprez (=35th place)

== Hockey ==
Belgium was represented by 16 hockey players.

- Belgium - =11th place

André Muschs, Claude Ravinet,Daniel Moussiaux, Eric Van Beuren, Franz Lorette, Freddy Rens, Guy Miserque, Guy Verhoeven, Jacques Rémy, Jacques Vanderstappen, Jean-Louis le Clerc, Jean-Louis Roersch, Jean-Marie Buisset, Michel Berger, Michel Muschs, Yves Bernaert

== Rowing ==
Two rowers represented Belgium.

- Double sculls - Michel De Meulemeester, Gérard Higny (9th place)

== Sailing ==
Belgium was represented by one sailor.

- Finn class (one person dinghy), open - André Nelis (10th place)

== Shooting ==
One shooter represented Belgium.

50 m rifle, three positions

- Frans Lafortune

50 m rifle, prone

- Frans Lafortune

== Swimming ==
Two swimmers represented Belgium.

Men

Athlete	Event	Heat		Semifinal		Final	
Athlete	Event	Time	Rank	Time	Rank	Time	Rank
François Simons	100 m freestyle	56.8	=36	Did not advance			
Herman Verbauwen	200 m backstroke	2:24.9	=26	Did not advance			

== Water polo ==
Belgium was represented by 11 water polo players.

- Jacques Caufrier, Bruno De Hesselle, Karel De Vis, Roger De Wilde, Frank D'Osterlinck, Nicolas Dumont, André Laurent, Léon Pickers, Joseph Stappers, Johan Van Den Steen, Eric Van Reybroeck (the team did not start)

== Weightlifting ==
One weightlifter represented Belgium.

- Heavyweight - Serge Reding (10th place)

== Wrestling ==
Three wrestlers represented Belgium.

Greco-Roman:

- Flyweight - Maurice Mewis (=4th place)
- Featherweight - Jef Mewis (=6th place)
- Welterweight - Albert Michiels (eliminated)
