= Vriend =

Vriend is a Dutch surname meaning "friend". Notable people with the surname include:

- Ann Vriend, Canadian singer-songwriter and pianist
- Bep Vriend (born 1946), Dutch contract bridge player
- Cor Vriend (born 1949), Dutch long-distance runner
- Delwin Vriend (born 1966), Canadian activist
- Harry Vriend (born 1938), Dutch water polo player
- Jan Vriend (born 1938), Dutch composer, conductor and pianist
- Klaas Vriend (1952–2019), Dutch speed skater
- Wim Vriend (1941–2021), Dutch water polo player

== See also ==
- Vriend v. Alberta, Supreme Court of Canada case
