= Soviet Union men's Olympic water polo team records and statistics =

This article lists various water polo records and statistics in relation to the Soviet Union men's national water polo team and the Unified Team men's national water polo team (Note: In 1992, 12 of the 15 former Soviet Republics competed together as the Unified Team and marched under the Olympic Flag in the Barcelona Games.) at the Summer Olympics.

The Soviet Union men's national water polo team and the Unified Team men's national water polo team have participated in 10 of 27 official men's water polo tournaments.

== Abbreviations ==
Apps	Appearances	Rk	Rank	Ref	Reference	Cap No.	Water polo cap number
Pos	Playing position	FP	Field player	GK	Goalkeeper	ISHOF	International Swimming Hall of Fame
L/R	Handedness	L	Left-handed	R	Right-handed	Oly debut	Olympic debut in water polo
(C)	Captain	p.	page	pp.	pages		

== Team statistics ==
=== Comprehensive results by tournament ===
Notes:

- Results of Olympic qualification tournaments are not included. Numbers refer to the final placing of each team at the respective Games.
- At the 1904 Summer Olympics, a water polo tournament was contested, but only American contestants participated. Currently the International Olympic Committee (IOC) and the International Swimming Federation (FINA) consider water polo event as part of unofficial program in 1904.
- Related teams: Unified Team men's Olympic water polo team^{†}, Kazakhstan men's Olympic water polo team (statistics), Russia men's Olympic water polo team (statistics), Ukraine men's Olympic water polo team.
- Last updated: 5 May 2021.

Legend

- 1 – Champions
- 2 – Runners-up
- 3 – Third place
- 4 – Fourth place
- — – The nation did not participate in the Games
- Q – Qualified for forthcoming tournament
- – Hosts
- Team^{†} – Defunct team

Men's team	00	04	08	12	20	24	28	32	36	48	52	56	60	64	68	72	76	80	84	88	92	96	00	04	08	12	16	20	Years
Soviet Union^{†} (Note: The Olympic Committee of the Soviet Union was formed on 21 April 1951, and was recognised by the International Olympic Committee on 7 May 1951.)	—	—	—	—	—	—	—	—	—	—	7	3	2	3	2	1	8	1	—	3	Defunct								9
(International Olympic Committee) Unified Team^{†}	—	—	—	—	—	Part of Soviet Union															3	Defunct							1
Kazakhstan	—	—	—	—	—	Part of Soviet Union																	9	11		11		Q	4
Russian Federation	—	—	—	—	—	Part of Soviet Union																5	2	3					3
Ukraine	—	—	—	—	—	—	—	—	—	—	Part of Soviet Union											12							1
Total teams	7		4	6	12	13	14	5	16	18	21	10	16	13	15	16	12	12	12	12	12	12	12	12	12	12	12	12	

=== Number of appearances ===
Last updated: 5 May 2021.

Legend

- Year^{*} – As host team
- Team^{†} – Defunct team

Men's team	Apps	Record streak	Active streak	Debut	Most recent	Best finish	Confederation
Soviet Union^{†}	9	8	0	1952	1988	Champions	Europe – LEN
(International Olympic Committee) Unified Team^{†}	1	1	0	1992	1992	Third place	Europe – LEN

=== Best finishes ===
Last updated: 5 May 2021.

Legend

- Year^{*} – As host team
- Team^{†} – Defunct team

Men's team	Best finish	Apps	Confederation
Soviet Union^{†}	Champions (1972, 1980^{*})	9	Europe – LEN
(International Olympic Committee) Unified Team^{†}	Third place (1992)	1	Europe – LEN

=== Finishes in the top four ===
Last updated: 5 May 2021.

Legend

- Year^{*} – As host team
- Team^{†} – Defunct team

Men's team	Total	Champions	Runners-up	Third place	Fourth place	First	Last
Soviet Union^{†}	7	2 (1972, 1980^{*})	2 (1960, 1968)	3 (1956, 1964, 1988)		1956	1988
(International Olympic Committee) Unified Team^{†}	1			1 (1992)		1992	1992

=== Medal table ===
Last updated: 5 May 2021.

Legend

- Team^{†} – Defunct team

Men's team	Gold	Silver	Bronze	Total
Soviet Union (URS)^{†}	2	2	3	7
Unified Team^{†}	0	0	1	1
Totals (2 entries)	2	2	4	8

== Player statistics ==
=== Multiple appearances ===
The following table is pre-sorted by number of Olympic appearances (in descending order), year of the last Olympic appearance (in ascending order), year of the first Olympic appearance (in ascending order), date of birth (in ascending order), name of the player (in ascending order), respectively.

- Number of five-time Olympians: 0
- Number of four-time Olympians: 1
- Last updated: 27 July 2021.

Legend

- – Hosts

Male athletes who competed in water polo at four or more Olympics
Apps	Player	Birth	Pos	Water polo tournaments					Age of first/last	ISHOF member	Note	Ref
Apps	Player	Birth	Pos	1	2	3	4	5	Age of first/last	ISHOF member	Note	Ref
4	Aleksei Barkalov	1946	FP	1968	1972	1976	1980		22/34	1993		

Notes:

- Dmitry Gorshkov is listed in Russia men's Olympic water polo team records and statistics.
- Nikolay Kozlov is listed in Russia men's Olympic water polo team records and statistics.

=== Multiple medalists ===
The following table is pre-sorted by total number of Olympic medals (in descending order), number of Olympic gold medals (in descending order), number of Olympic silver medals (in descending order), year of receiving the last Olympic medal (in ascending order), year of receiving the first Olympic medal (in ascending order), name of the player (in ascending order), respectively.

- Number of four-time Olympic medalists: 0
- Number of three-time Olympic medalists: 5
- Last updated: 5 May 2021.

Legend and abbreviation

- – Hosts
- EUN – Unified Team
- URS – Soviet Union

Male athletes who won three or more Olympic medals in water polo
Rk	Player	Birth	Height	Pos	Water polo tournaments					Period (age of first/last)	Medals				Ref
Rk	Player	Birth	Height	Pos	1	2	3	4	5	Period (age of first/last)	G	S	B	T	Ref
1	Aleksei Barkalov	1946	1.80 m (5 ft 11 in)	FP	1968	1972	1976	1980		12 years (22/34)	2	1	0	3	
2	Leonid Osipov	1943	1.87 m (6 ft 2 in)	FP	1964	1968	1972			8 years (21/29)	1	1	1	3	
3	Yevgeny Sharonov	1958	1.89 m (6 ft 2 in)	GK	1980; URS		1988; URS	1992; EUN		12 years (21/33)	1	0	2	3	
4	Vladimir Semyonov	1938	1.84 m (6 ft 0 in)	FP	1960	1964	1968			8 years (22/30)	0	2	1	3	
4	Viktor Ageyev	1936	1.84 m (6 ft 0 in)	FP	1956	1960	1964			8 years (20/28)	0	1	2	3	

Notes:

- Dmitry Gorshkov is listed in Russia men's Olympic water polo team records and statistics.
- Nikolay Kozlov is listed in Russia men's Olympic water polo team records and statistics.

=== Top goalscorers ===
The following table is pre-sorted by number of total goals (in descending order), year of the last Olympic appearance (in ascending order), year of the first Olympic appearance (in ascending order), name of the player (in ascending order), respectively.

- Number of goalscorers (50+ goals): 0
- Number of goalscorers (40–49 goals): 0
- Number of goalscorers (30–39 goals): 1
- Last updated: 1 April 2021.

Legend

- – Hosts

Male players with 30 or more goals at the Olympics
Rk	Player	Birth	L/R	Total goals	Water polo tournaments (goals)					Age of first/last	ISHOF member	Note	Ref
Rk	Player	Birth	L/R	Total goals	1	2	3	4	5	Age of first/last	ISHOF member	Note	Ref
1	Aleksei Barkalov	1946		38	1968 (14)	1972 (10)	1976 (6)	1980 (8)		22/34	1993		

- Official Reports (PDF): 1952–1980, 1988.

Note:

- Dmitry Apanasenko is listed in Russia men's Olympic water polo team records and statistics.

=== Goalkeepers ===
The following table is pre-sorted by edition of the Olympics (in ascending order), cap number or name of the goalkeeper (in ascending order), respectively.

Last updated: 5 May 2021.

Legend

- – Hosts

Year	Cap No.	Goalkeeper	Birth	Age	ISHOF member	Note	Ref
1952		Boris Goykhman	1919	33		Starting goalkeeper	
1952		(Unknown)					
1956 (bronze)		Boris Goykhman (2)	1919	37			
1956 (bronze)		Mikhail Ryzhak	1927	29			
1960 (silver)		Leri Gogoladze	1938	22			
1960 (silver)		Boris Goykhman (3)	1919	41			
1964 (bronze)	1	Igor Grabovsky	1941	23			
1964 (bronze)	11	Eduard Egorov	1940	24			
1968 (silver)	1	Vadim Gulyayev	1941	27			
1968 (silver)	11	Oleg Bovin	1946	22			
1972 (gold)	1	Vadim Gulyayev (2)	1941	31			
1972 (gold)	11	Viacheslav Sobchenko	1949	23			
1976	1	Anatoly Klebanov	1952	23			
1976	11	Aleksandr Zakharov	1954	22			
1980 (gold)	1	Yevgeny Sharonov	1958	21	2003		
1980 (gold)	11	Viacheslav Sobchenko (2)	1949	31			
1988 (bronze)	1	Yevgeny Sharonov (2)	1958	29	2003		
1988 (bronze)	13	Mikheil Giorgadze	1961	27			
1992 (bronze)	1	Yevgeny Sharonov (3)	1958	33	2003		
1992 (bronze)	13	Alexander Tchigir	1968	23			
Year	Cap No.	Goalkeeper	Birth	Age	ISHOF member	Note	Ref

Note:

- Alexander Tchigir is also listed in Germany men's Olympic water polo team records and statistics.

== Coach statistics ==
=== Most successful coaches ===
The following table is pre-sorted by total number of Olympic medals (in descending order), number of Olympic gold medals (in descending order), number of Olympic silver medals (in descending order), year of winning the last Olympic medal (in ascending order), year of winning the first Olympic medal (in ascending order), name of the coach (in ascending order), respectively. Last updated: 5 May 2021.

Boris Popov led the Soviet Union men's national water polo team to win an Olympic gold medal in 1980 and a bronze medal in 1988. Four years later, he coached the Unified Team men's national water polo team to another bronze medal.

Legend

- – Hosts

Head coaches who led men's national teams to win three or more Olympic medals
Rk	Head coach	Nationality	Birth	Age	Men's team	Tournaments (finish)					Period	Medals				Ref
Rk	Head coach	Nationality	Birth	Age	Men's team	1	2	3	4	5	Period	G	S	B	T	Ref
1	Boris Popov	Soviet Union	1941	39, 47	Soviet Union	1980 (1st)		1988 (3rd)			12 years	1	0	2	3	
1	Boris Popov	Russia	1941	51	(International Olympic Committee) Unified Team				1992 (3rd)		12 years	1	0	2	3	

=== Medals as coach and player ===
The following table is pre-sorted by total number of Olympic medals (in descending order), number of Olympic gold medals (in descending order), number of Olympic silver medals (in descending order), year of winning the last Olympic medal (in ascending order), year of winning the first Olympic medal (in ascending order), name of the person (in ascending order), respectively. Last updated: 5 May 2021.

Vladimir Semyonov, representing the Soviet Union, won three Olympic medals in a row between 1960 and 1968. As a head coach, he led the Soviet Union men's national water polo team to win an Olympic gold medal in 1972.

Soviet Boris Popov won a bronze medal at the Tokyo Olympics in 1964. He guided the Soviet Union men's national team to two Olympic medals in 1980 and 1988, and the Unified Team to a bronze medal in 1992.

Aleksandr Kabanov of the Soviet Union won a gold at the Munich Olympics in 1972, coached by Vladimir Semyonov. Eight years later, he won the second gold medal at the Moscow Olympics in 1980, coached by Boris Popov. As a head coach, he led Russia men's national team to win two consecutive medals in 2000 and 2004.

Legend

- Year^{*} – As host team

Rk	Person	Birth	Height	Player				Head coach			Total medals				Ref
Rk	Person	Birth	Height	Age	Men's team	Pos	Medal	Age	Men's team	Medal	G	S	B	T	Ref
1	Aleksandr Kabanov	1948	1.81 m (5 ft 11 in)	24, 32	Soviet Union	FP	1972 (gold) , 1980^{*} (gold)	52–56	Russia	2000 (silver) , 2004 (bronze)	2	1	1	4	
2	Vladimir Semyonov	1938	1.84 m (6 ft 0 in)	22–30	Soviet Union	FP	1960 (silver) , 1964 (bronze) , 1968 (silver)	34	Soviet Union	1972 (gold)	1	2	1	4	
3	Boris Popov	1941	1.81 m (5 ft 11 in)	23	Soviet Union	FP	1964 (bronze)	39, 47	Soviet Union	1980^{*} (gold) , 1988 (bronze)	1	0	3	4	
3	Boris Popov	1941	1.81 m (5 ft 11 in)	23	Soviet Union	FP	1964 (bronze)	51	(International Olympic Committee) Unified Team	1992 (bronze)	1	0	3	4	

== Olympic champions ==
=== 1972 Summer Olympics ===
- Edition of men's tournament: 16th
- Host city: Munich, West Germany
- Number of participating teams: 16
- Competition format: Round-robin pools advanced teams to the round-robin final pool
- Champion: Soviet Union (1st title; 1st place in preliminary C group; 1st place in final I group)

Match	Round	Date	Opponent	Result	Goals for	Goals against	Goal diff.
Match 1/8	Preliminary round – Group C	27 August 1972	Italy	Won	4	1	3
Match 2/8	Preliminary round – Group C	28 August 1972	Japan	Won	11	1	10
Match 3/8	Preliminary round – Group C	29 August 1972	Bulgaria	Won	7	2	5
Match 4/8	Preliminary round – Group C	30 August 1972	Spain	Won	8	5	3
Match 5/8	Final round – Group I	1 September 1972	Yugoslavia	Won	5	4	1
Match 6/8	Final round – Group I	2 September 1972	West Germany	Won	4	2	2
Match 7/8	Final round – Group I	3 September 1972	United States	Drawn	6	6	0
Match 8/8	Final round – Group I	4 September 1972	Hungary	Drawn	3	3	0
Total	Matches played: 8 • Wins: 6 • Ties: 2 • Defeats: 0 • Win %: 75.0%				48	24	24

Source: Official Reports (PDF): 1972 (pp. 358, 359, 363, 364, 365).

- Head coach: (Soviet Union) Vladimir Semyonov (1st title as head coach)

Roster
Cap No.	Player	Pos	Height	Weight	Date of birth	Age of winning gold	Oly debut	Goals	ISHOF member
1	Vadim Gulyayev	GK	1.83 m (6 ft 0 in)	90 kg (198 lb)	5 February 1941	31 years, 212 days	No	0	
2	Anatoly Akimov	FP	1.81 m (5 ft 11 in)	84 kg (185 lb)	15 November 1947	24 years, 294 days	Yes	10	
3	Aleksandr Dreval	FP	1.90 m (6 ft 3 in)	89 kg (196 lb)	17 July 1944	28 years, 49 days	Yes	11	
4	Aleksandr Dolgushin	FP	1.87 m (6 ft 2 in)	99 kg (218 lb)	7 March 1946	26 years, 181 days	No	2	2010
5	Vladimir Zhmudsky	FP	1.80 m (5 ft 11 in)	81 kg (179 lb)	23 January 1947	25 years, 225 days	Yes	2	
6	Aleksandr Kabanov	FP	1.81 m (5 ft 11 in)	84 kg (185 lb)	11 June 1948	24 years, 85 days	Yes	1	2001
7	Aleksei Barkalov	FP	1.80 m (5 ft 11 in)	82 kg (181 lb)	18 February 1946	26 years, 199 days	No	10	1993
8	Aleksandr Shidlovsky	FP	1.80 m (5 ft 11 in)	82 kg (181 lb)	1 February 1941	31 years, 216 days	No	4	
9	Nikolay Melnikov	FP	1.84 m (6 ft 0 in)	86 kg (190 lb)	24 January 1948	24 years, 224 days	Yes	1	
10	Leonid Osipov	FP	1.87 m (6 ft 2 in)	90 kg (198 lb)	6 February 1943	29 years, 211 days	No	7	
11	Viacheslav Sobchenko	GK	1.87 m (6 ft 2 in)	86 kg (190 lb)	18 April 1949	23 years, 139 days	Yes	0	
Average			1.84 m (6 ft 0 in)	87 kg (192 lb)	19 September 1945	26 years, 351 days	Total	48	
Coach	Vladimir Semyonov		1.84 m (6 ft 0 in)		10 May 1938	34 years, 117 days			

Sources:

- Official Reports (PDF): 1972 (pp. 358, 359, 363, 364, 365);
- Olympedia: 1972 (men's tournament);
- Sports Reference: 1972 (men's tournament);
- ISHOF.

=== 1980 Summer Olympics ===
- Edition of men's tournament: 18th
- Host city: Moscow, Soviet Union
- Number of participating teams: 12
- Competition format: Round-robin pools advanced teams to the round-robin final pool
- Champion: Soviet Union (2nd title; 1st place in preliminary A group; 1st place in final A group)

Match	Round	Date	Opponent	Result	Goals for	Goals against	Goal diff.
Match 1/8	Preliminary round – Group A	20 July 1980	(International Olympic Committee) Italy	Won	8	6	2
Match 2/8	Preliminary round – Group A	21 July 1980	(International Olympic Committee) Spain	Won	4	3	1
Match 3/8	Preliminary round – Group A	22 July 1980	Sweden	Won	12	1	11
Match 4/8	Final round – Group A	24 July 1980	Hungary	Won	5	4	1
Match 5/8	Final round – Group A	25 July 1980	(International Olympic Committee) Spain	Won	6	2	4
Match 6/8	Final round – Group A	26 July 1980	Cuba	Won	8	5	3
Match 7/8	Final round – Group A	28 July 1980	(International Olympic Committee) Netherlands	Won	7	3	4
Match 8/8	Final round – Group A	29 July 1980	Yugoslavia	Won	8	7	1
Total	Matches played: 8 • Wins: 8 • Ties: 0 • Defeats: 0 • Win %: 100%				58	31	27

Source: Official Reports (PDF): 1980 (pp. 497, 500, 501, 502).

- Head coach: (Soviet Union) Boris Popov (1st title as head coach)

Roster
Cap No.	Player	Pos	Height	Weight	Date of birth	Age of winning gold	Oly debut	Goals	ISHOF member
1	Yevgeny Sharonov	GK	1.89 m (6 ft 2 in)	96 kg (212 lb)	11 December 1958	21 years, 231 days	Yes	0	2003
2	Sergey Kotenko	FP	1.76 m (5 ft 9 in)	78 kg (172 lb)	2 December 1956	23 years, 240 days	No	9	
3	Vladimir Akimov	FP	1.84 m (6 ft 0 in)	80 kg (176 lb)	20 July 1953	27 years, 9 days	Yes	3	
4	Yevgeny Grishin	FP	1.89 m (6 ft 2 in)	93 kg (205 lb)	1 October 1959	20 years, 302 days	Yes	5	
5	Mait Riisman	FP	1.79 m (5 ft 10 in)	83 kg (183 lb)	23 September 1956	23 years, 310 days	Yes	4	
6	Aleksandr Kabanov	FP	1.81 m (5 ft 11 in)	84 kg (185 lb)	11 June 1948	32 years, 48 days	No	5	2001
7	Aleksei Barkalov	FP	1.80 m (5 ft 11 in)	82 kg (181 lb)	18 February 1946	34 years, 162 days	No	8	1993
8	Erkin Shagaev	FP	1.78 m (5 ft 10 in)	74 kg (163 lb)	12 February 1959	21 years, 168 days	Yes	5	
9	Giorgi Mshvenieradze	FP	1.88 m (6 ft 2 in)	104 kg (229 lb)	12 August 1960	19 years, 352 days	Yes	9	
10	Mikhail Ivanov	FP	1.88 m (6 ft 2 in)	98 kg (216 lb)	18 April 1958	22 years, 102 days	Yes	10	
11	Viacheslav Sobchenko	GK	1.87 m (6 ft 2 in)	86 kg (190 lb)	18 April 1949	31 years, 102 days	No	0	
Average			1.84 m (6 ft 0 in)	87 kg (192 lb)	3 April 1955	25 years, 117 days	Total	58	
Coach	Boris Popov		1.81 m (5 ft 11 in)		21 March 1941	39 years, 130 days			2019

Sources:

- Official Reports (PDF): 1980 (pp. 497, 500, 501, 502);
- Olympedia: 1980 (men's tournament);
- Sports Reference: 1980 (men's tournament);
- ISHOF.

== See also ==
- Kazakhstan men's Olympic water polo team records and statistics
- Russia men's Olympic water polo team records and statistics
- List of men's Olympic water polo tournament records and statistics
- Lists of Olympic water polo records and statistics
- Soviet Union at the Olympics
- Unified Team at the Olympics

== Sources ==
=== Official Reports (IOC) ===
PDF documents in the LA84 Foundation Digital Library:

- Official Report of the 1896 Olympic Games (download, archive)
- Official Report of the 1900 Olympic Games (download, archive)
- Official Report of the 1904 Olympic Games (download, archive)
- Official Report of the 1908 Olympic Games (download, archive) (pp. 359–361)
- Official Report of the 1912 Olympic Games (download, archive) (pp. 1021–1024, 1031–1037)
- Official Report of the 1920 Olympic Games (download, archive) (p. 130)
- Official Report of the 1924 Olympic Games (download, archive) (pp. 439–440, 486–494)
- Official Report of the 1928 Olympic Games (download, archive) (pp. 746–757, 797–807)
- Official Report of the 1932 Olympic Games (download, archive) (pp. 619–623, 646–652)
- Official Report of the 1936 Olympic Games, v.2 (download, archive) (pp. 345–356)
- Official Report of the 1948 Olympic Games (download, archive) (pp. 537–540, 640–647)
- Official Report of the 1952 Olympic Games (download, archive) (pp. 600–608)
- Official Report of the 1956 Olympic Games (download, archive) (pp. 592–594, 624–627)
- Official Report of the 1960 Olympic Games (download, archive) (pp. 552–555, 617–634)
- Official Report of the 1964 Olympic Games, v.2 (download, archive) (pp. 682–698)
- Official Report of the 1968 Olympic Games, v.3 (download, archive) (pp. 449–466, 811–826)
- Official Report of the 1972 Olympic Games, v.3 (download, archive) (pp. 331, 353–365)
- Official Report of the 1976 Olympic Games, v.3 (download, archive) (pp. 446–447, 484–497)
- Official Report of the 1980 Olympic Games, v.3 (download, archive) (pp. 458, 495–510)
- Official Report of the 1984 Olympic Games, v.2 (download, archive) (pp. 528–534)
- Official Report of the 1988 Olympic Games, v.2 (download, archive) (pp. 590–598)
- Official Report of the 1992 Olympic Games, v.5 (download, archive) (pp. 354, 386–400)
- Official Report of the 1996 Olympic Games, v.3 (download, archive) (pp. 56–73)

=== Official Results Books (IOC) ===
PDF documents in the LA84 Foundation Digital Library:

- Official Results Book – 2000 Olympic Games – Water Polo (download, archive)
- Official Results Book – 2004 Olympic Games – Water Polo (download, archive)
- Official Results Book – 2008 Olympic Games – Water Polo (download, archive)

PDF documents on the FINA website:

- Official Results Book – 2012 Olympic Games – Diving, Swimming, Synchronised Swimming, Water Polo (archive) (pp. 284–507)

PDF documents in the Olympic World Library:

- Official Results Book – 2016 Olympic Games – Water Polo (archive)

PDF documents on the International Olympic Committee website:

- Official Results Book – 2020 Olympic Games – Water Polo (archive)
- Official Results Book – 2024 Olympic Games – Water Polo

=== Official Reports (FINA) ===
PDF documents on the FINA website:

- HistoFINA – Water polo medalists and statistics (as of September 2019) (archive) (pp. 4–13)
- 1870–2020 | 150 years of Water Polo – Evolution of its rules (archive)

=== Official website (IOC) ===
Water polo on the International Olympic Committee website:

- Water polo
- Men's water polo

=== Olympedia ===
Water polo on the Olympedia website:

- Water polo Archived 2021-12-28 at the Wayback Machine
- Men's water polo
- Athlete count for water polo
- Water polo venues
- Water polo at the 1900 Summer Olympics (men's tournament)
- Water polo at the 1904 Summer Olympics (men's tournament)
- Water polo at the 1908 Summer Olympics (men's tournament)
- Water polo at the 1912 Summer Olympics (men's tournament)
- Water polo at the 1920 Summer Olympics (men's tournament)
- Water polo at the 1924 Summer Olympics (men's tournament)
- Water polo at the 1928 Summer Olympics (men's tournament)
- Water polo at the 1932 Summer Olympics (men's tournament)
- Water polo at the 1936 Summer Olympics (men's tournament)
- Water polo at the 1948 Summer Olympics (men's tournament)
- Water polo at the 1952 Summer Olympics (men's tournament)
- Water polo at the 1956 Summer Olympics (men's tournament)
- Water polo at the 1960 Summer Olympics (men's tournament)
- Water polo at the 1964 Summer Olympics (men's tournament)
- Water polo at the 1968 Summer Olympics (men's tournament)
- Water polo at the 1972 Summer Olympics (men's tournament)
- Water polo at the 1976 Summer Olympics (men's tournament)
- Water polo at the 1980 Summer Olympics (men's tournament)
- Water polo at the 1984 Summer Olympics (men's tournament)
- Water polo at the 1988 Summer Olympics (men's tournament)
- Water polo at the 1992 Summer Olympics (men's tournament)
- Water polo at the 1996 Summer Olympics (men's tournament)
- Water polo at the 2000 Summer Olympics (men's tournament)
- Water polo at the 2004 Summer Olympics (men's tournament)
- Water polo at the 2008 Summer Olympics (men's tournament)
- Water polo at the 2012 Summer Olympics (men's tournament)
- Water polo at the 2016 Summer Olympics (men's tournament)
- Water polo at the 2020 Summer Olympics (men's tournament)

=== Sports Reference ===
Water polo on the Sports Reference website:

- Country Medal Leaders & Athlete Medal Leaders (1900–2016) (archived)
- Men's water polo (1900–2016) (archived)
- Water polo at the 1900 Summer Games (men's tournament) (archived)
- Water polo at the 1904 Summer Games (men's tournament) (archived)
- Water polo at the 1908 Summer Games (men's tournament) (archived)
- Water polo at the 1912 Summer Games (men's tournament) (archived)
- Water polo at the 1920 Summer Games (men's tournament) (archived)
- Water polo at the 1924 Summer Games (men's tournament) (archived)
- Water polo at the 1928 Summer Games (men's tournament) (archived)
- Water polo at the 1932 Summer Games (men's tournament) (archived)
- Water polo at the 1936 Summer Games (men's tournament) (archived)
- Water polo at the 1948 Summer Games (men's tournament) (archived)
- Water polo at the 1952 Summer Games (men's tournament) (archived)
- Water polo at the 1956 Summer Games (men's tournament) (archived)
- Water polo at the 1960 Summer Games (men's tournament) (archived)
- Water polo at the 1964 Summer Games (men's tournament) (archived)
- Water polo at the 1968 Summer Games (men's tournament) (archived)
- Water polo at the 1972 Summer Games (men's tournament) (archived)
- Water polo at the 1976 Summer Games (men's tournament) (archived)
- Water polo at the 1980 Summer Games (men's tournament) (archived)
- Water polo at the 1984 Summer Games (men's tournament) (archived)
- Water polo at the 1988 Summer Games (men's tournament) (archived)
- Water polo at the 1992 Summer Games (men's tournament) (archived)
- Water polo at the 1996 Summer Games (men's tournament) (archived)
- Water polo at the 2000 Summer Games (men's tournament) (archived)
- Water polo at the 2004 Summer Games (men's tournament) (archived)
- Water polo at the 2008 Summer Games (men's tournament) (archived)
- Water polo at the 2012 Summer Games (men's tournament) (archived)
- Water polo at the 2016 Summer Games (men's tournament) (archived)
- Water polo at the 2020 Summer Games (men's tournament) (archived)

=== Todor66 ===
Water polo on the Todor66 website:

- Water polo at the Summer Games
- Water polo at the 1900 Summer Olympics (men's tournament)
- Water polo at the 1904 Summer Olympics (men's tournament)
- Water polo at the 1908 Summer Olympics (men's tournament)
- Water polo at the 1912 Summer Olympics (men's tournament)
- Water polo at the 1920 Summer Olympics (men's tournament)
- Water polo at the 1924 Summer Olympics (men's tournament)
- Water polo at the 1928 Summer Olympics (men's tournament)
- Water polo at the 1932 Summer Olympics (men's tournament)
- Water polo at the 1936 Summer Olympics (men's tournament)
- Water polo at the 1948 Summer Olympics (men's tournament)
- Water polo at the 1952 Summer Olympics (men's tournament)
- Water polo at the 1956 Summer Olympics (men's tournament)
- Water polo at the 1960 Summer Olympics (men's tournament)
- Water polo at the 1964 Summer Olympics (men's tournament)
- Water polo at the 1968 Summer Olympics (men's tournament, men's qualification)
- Water polo at the 1972 Summer Olympics (men's tournament, men's qualification)
- Water polo at the 1976 Summer Olympics (men's tournament, men's European qualification)
- Water polo at the 1980 Summer Olympics (men's tournament, men's European qualification, men's world qualification)
- Water polo at the 1984 Summer Olympics (men's tournament, men's qualification)
- Water polo at the 1988 Summer Olympics (men's tournament, men's qualification)
- Water polo at the 1992 Summer Olympics (men's tournament, men's qualification)
- Water polo at the 1996 Summer Olympics (men's tournament, men's qualification)
- Water polo at the 2000 Summer Olympics (men's tournament, men's qualification)
- Water polo at the 2004 Summer Olympics (men's tournament, men's qualification)
- Water polo at the 2008 Summer Olympics (men's tournament, men's qualification)
- Water polo at the 2012 Summer Olympics (men's tournament, men's qualification)
- Water polo at the 2016 Summer Olympics (men's tournament, men's qualification)
- Water polo at the 2020 Summer Olympics (men's tournament, men's qualification)
- Water polo at the 2024 Summer Olympics (men's tournament, men's qualification)

=== ISHOF ===
International Swimming Hall of Fame (ISHOF) website:

- Honorees Listed by Category – Water Polo
- Honorees Listed by Category – Coaches
- Honorees Listed by Category – Contributors
- Honorees by Country
- Honorees By Last Name
