= Yevgeny Grishin =

Yevgeny Grishin may refer to:

- Yevgeny Grishin (speed skater) (1931–2005), Russian speed skater
- Yevgeny Grishin (water polo) (born 1959), Russian water polo player
