= Heuvelmans =

Heuvelmans is a Dutch surname. Notable people with the surname include:

- Bernard Heuvelmans (1916–2001), French cryptozoologist
- Leopold Heuvelmans (born 1945), Belgian cyclist
- Lucienne Heuvelmans (1885–1944), French sculptor
