= Bortkevich =

Bortkevich is a surname. Notable people with the surname include:

- Zenon Bortkevich (1937–2010), Soviet water polo player
- Leonid Bortkevich (1949–2021), singer from the musical group Pesniary

== See also ==
- Bortkiewicz
