= William Phillips (water polo) =

Australian water polo player (1943–2022)

Personal information
- Full name: William John Berge Phillips
- Born: 4 September 1943 Manly, New South Wales, Australia
- Died: 26 July 2022 (aged 78) Mosman, New South Wales, Australia

Sport
- Sport: Water polo

William John Berge Phillips (4 September 1943 – 26 July 2022) was an Australian water polo player. He competed in the men's tournament at the 1964 Summer Olympics.

== Biography ==
William Phillips grew up as the son of swimming official William Berge Phillips OBE (1913–2003) in Sydney, in the administrative district of Mosman. There he attended Mosman Primary School. At the age of seven, he joined the Balmoral Swimming Club.

In 1962, Phillips was selected for the water polo team of New South Wales. He represented the team in 1962, 1964, 1965, 1966, 1967, 1968 and 1971.

At the 1964 Summer Olympics in Tokyo, Phillips finished 9th with the Australian national team. It was the first Olympic appearance of an Australian water polo team. He was also set to compete at the 1968 Summer Olympics in Mexico City. However, the Australian Olympic Committee refused to pay the travel expenses of the water polo team. Although the players were willing to cover their own costs, they were ultimately excluded from participation.

Phillips studied law at the University of Sydney and later became a lawyer. In 1970, he married Carolyn Ruth Brinsmead.
