= Boris Goykhman =

Soviet water polo player

Personal information
- Born: April 28, 1919 Voznesensk, Ukrainian SSR
- Died: October 28, 2005 (aged 86) Moscow, Russia

Sport
- Sport: Water polo
Medal record
Representing Soviet Union
Olympic Games
Silver medal – second place	1960 Rome	Team competition
Bronze medal – third place	1956 Melbourne	Team competition

Boris Abramovich Goykhman (Russian: Борис Абрамович Гойхман, 28 April 1919 – 28 October 2005) was a Soviet water polo player who competed for the Soviet Union in the 1952 Summer Olympics, in the 1956 Summer Olympics, and in the 1960 Summer Olympics.

== Career ==
He was Jewish, and was born in Voznesensk, Ukrainian SSR.

In 1952, he was a member of the Soviet team which finished seventh in the Olympic water polo tournament. He played all nine matches as a goalkeeper.

Four years later, he won the bronze medal with the Soviet team in the water polo competition at the 1956 Games. He played six matches as a goalkeeper.

At the 1960 Games, he was part of the Soviet team which competed in the Olympic water polo tournament. He played four matches as a goalkeeper. On 3 September 1960, he won an Olympic silver medal at the age of 41 years and 128 days, becoming the oldest Olympic silver medalist in water polo.

== See also ==
- Soviet Union men's Olympic water polo team records and statistics
- List of Olympic medalists in water polo (men)
- List of men's Olympic water polo tournament goalkeepers
- List of select Jewish water polo players
