= Osvaldo Cochrane Filho =

Brazilian water polo player (1933–2020)

Oswaldo Cochrane Filho
Personal information
- Full name: Oswaldo Cochrane Filho
- Born: 29 July 1933; Vitória, Espírito Santo, Brazil
- Died: 9 December 2020 (aged 87); Rio de Janeiro, Brazil

Sport
- Sport: Water polo

Oswaldo Cochrane Filho (29 July 1933 – 9 December 2020) was a Brazilian water polo player. He competed in the men's tournament at the 1964 Summer Olympics.

Oswaldo started swimming at Fluminense at the age of 12. In 1952, aged 19, he joined the club's water polo team that went undefeated for 104 games (from 1952 to 1961). He defended his national team for the first time in 1955 until he retired after the 1971 Pan American Games.

He died from COVID-19 during the COVID-19 pandemic in Brazil.
