= Tokyo Metropolitan Indoor Swimming Pool =

Swimming venue in Tokyo, Japan

Coordinates: 35.679078°N 139.711193°E

- Interactive map of Tokyo Metropolitan Indoor Swimming Pool
- Location: Shibuya, Tokyo, Japan
- Owner: Tokyo Metropolitan Government
- Capacity: 3,000 (1964)

Construction
- Opened: 1958

The Tokyo Metropolitan Indoor Swimming Pool is an aquatics venue located in Tokyo. It hosted the water polo tournament during the 1964 Summer Olympics.

It was constructed initially as the swimming venue for the 1958 Asian Games.
