= Stan Hammond =

Australian water polo player

Personal information
- Nationality: Australian
- Born: 18 March 1942
- Died: 6 March 2010 (aged 67)

Sport
- Sport: Water polo

Stan Hammond (18 March 1942 – 6 March 2010) was an Australian water polo player. He competed in the men's tournament at the 1964 Summer Olympics.
