= Ney Nogueira =

Brazilian water polo player

Personal information
- Born: 21 July 1936; Rio de Janeiro, Brazil
- Died: 27 January 2017 (aged 80)

Sport
- Sport: Water polo

Ney Nogueira (21 July 1936 – 27 January 2017) was a Brazilian water polo player. He competed in the men's tournament at the 1964 Summer Olympics.
