= Bortkiewicz =

Bortkiewicz (Polish pronunciation: [bɔrtˈkjɛvitʂ]) is a surname of Polish-language origin. Notable people with the surname include:

- Ladislaus Bortkiewicz (Polish: Władysław Bortkiewicz, Russian: Владислав Иосифович Бортке́вич; 1868–1931), Polish-Russian economist and statistician
  - For Bortkiewicz distribution, see Poisson distribution
  - For Bortkiewicz' interpretation of Karl Marx's value theory, see Temporal single-system interpretation
- Sergei Bortkiewicz, Russian and Austrian pianist and composer of Polish origins
- Paweł Bortkiewicz
- Wincenty Bortkiewicz

== See also ==
- Bortkevich
