= Vadim Gulyayev =

Russian water polo player

Personal information
- Born: 5 February 1941 Moscow, Soviet Union
- Died: 12 December 1998 (aged 57) Moscow, Russia

Sport
- Sport: Water polo
Medal record
Representing Soviet Union
Olympic Games
Gold medal – first place	1972 Munich	Team competition
Silver medal – second place	1968 Mexico City	Team competition

Vadim Vladimirovich Gulyayev (Russian: Вадим Владимирович Гуляев; 5 February 1941 – 12 December 1998) was a Russian water polo player who competed for the Soviet Union in the 1968 Summer Olympics and in the 1972 Summer Olympics.

== See also ==
- Soviet Union men's Olympic water polo team records and statistics
- List of Olympic champions in men's water polo
- List of Olympic medalists in water polo (men)
- List of men's Olympic water polo tournament goalkeepers
