= Heinz Wittig =

German water polo player

Personal information
- Nationality: German
- Born: 3 March 1938; Halle, Germany
- Died: 15 August 2012 (aged 74); Leipzig, Germany

Sport
- Sport: Water polo

Heinz Wittig (3 March 1938 – 15 August 2012) was a German water polo player. He competed in the men's tournament at the 1964 Summer Olympics.
