= Graeme Samuel (water polo) =

Australian water polo player

Personal information
- Nationality: Australian
- Born: 10 April 1944 (age 80)

Sport
- Sport: Water polo

Graeme Samuel (born 10 April 1944) is an Australian water polo player. He competed in the men's tournament at the 1964 Summer Olympics.
