= Yelena Grishina =

Soviet fencer

Personal information
- Native name: Елена Борисовна Гришина
- Full name: Yelena Borisovna Grishina
- Nationality: Soviet Union
- Born: 6 November 1968 (age 57) Moscow, Soviet Union
- Height: 180 cm (5 ft 11 in)
- Weight: 76 kg (168 lb)
- Children: Sergey Bida (son)
- Parents: Boris Grishin (father); Valentina Rastvorova (mother)
- Relatives: Yevgeny Grishin (brother)

Sport
- Country: Soviet Union
- Sport: Fencing
- Event: foil
- Team: Soviet Union, Unified Team

Achievements and titles
- Olympic finals: 1988 Olympics, 1992 Olympics

Yelena Borisovna Grishina (Russian: Елена Борисовна Гришина; born 6 November 1968) is a former Soviet fencer. She competed in the women's team foil events at the 1988 and 1992 Summer Olympics. In the 1989 World Fencing Championships and the 1990 World Fencing Championships she won silver medals in foil team competing for the Soviet Union, and in 1995 she won a bronze medal in the European Championships in foil.

Grishina is a member of Match TV, the press attaché and spokesperson of the Russian Fencing Federation.

== Personal life ==
Yelena comes from a family of Olympians. Her father, Boris Grishin, medaled in water polo in the Olympics, and her brother Yevgeny Grishin won bronze in water polo in the Olympics as well.

Grishina's mother, Valentina Rastvorova, was born in Odessa, Ukraine. She was a six-time world champion foil fencer who ascended the Olympic podium twice.

Her son, Sergey Bida, is a top-ranked épée fencer who made his Olympic debut in Tokyo, winning a silver medal. He was ranked #1 in the world in 2020. He is also a three-time European épée team champion. He moved to the United States in 2023 after the Russian invasion of Ukraine, along with his wife, Olympic épée fencer Violetta Khrapina Bida.

== Fencing career ==
She competed in the women's team foil events at the 1988 (for the Soviet Union) and 1992 Summer Olympics (for the Unified Team), with the team coming in fourth at each Olympics.

In the 1989 World Fencing Championships and the 1990 World Fencing Championships she won silver medals in foil team competing for the Soviet Union.

In 1995 she won a bronze medal in the European Championships in foil.
