= Ted Peirce =

Australian water polo player (1933–2026)

Personal information
- Born: 3 July 1933 Sydney, New South Wales, Australia
- Died: 25 May 2026 (aged 92)

Vale Edward "Ted" Peirce (3 July 1933 – 25 May 2026) was an Australian water polo player who competed at three Olympic Games.

He competed at the 1956 Melbourne, 1960 Rome and the 1964 Tokyo Olympics.
