= Valentina Rastvorova =

Soviet fencer

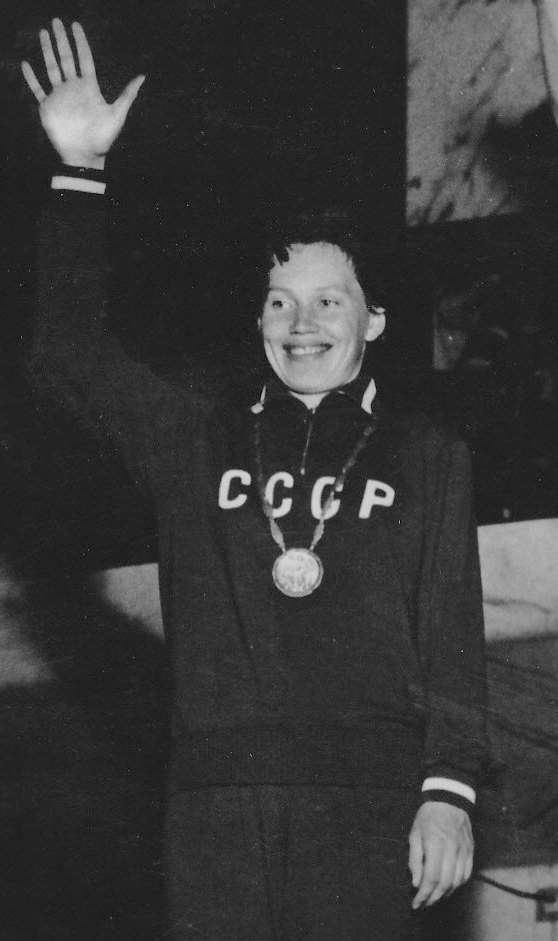
- Rastvorova at the 1960 Olympics

Personal information
- Born: Валентина Ксенофонтовна Растворова; Валентина Ксенофонтівна Растворова; 17 July 1933 Odesa, Ukrainian SSR, Soviet Union
- Died: 24 August 2018 (aged 85)
- Height: 1.67 m (5 ft 6 in)
- Weight: 60 kg (132 lb)
- Spouse: Boris Grishin
- Children: Yevgeny Grishin (son); Yelena Grishina (daughter)
- Relatives: Sergey Bida (grandson)

Sport
- Sport: Fencing
- Event: Foil
- Club: Dynamo Moscow
Medal record
Representing the Soviet Union
Olympic Games
Gold medal – first place	1960 Rome	Foil team
Silver medal – second place	1960 Rome	Foil individual
Silver medal – second place	1964 Tokyo	Foil team
World Fencing Championships
Gold medal – first place	1956 London	Foil team
Gold medal – first place	1958 Philadelphia	Foil individual
Gold medal – first place	1958 Philadelphia	Foil team
Gold medal – first place	1961 Turin	Foil team
Silver medal – second place	1962 Buenos Aires	Foil team
Gold medal – first place	1965 Paris	Foil team
Gold medal – first place	1966 Moscow	Foil team
Silver medal – second place	1967 Montreal	Foil team

Valentyna Ksenofontivna Rastvorova (Валентина Ксенофонтовна Растворова; 17 July 1933 – 24 August 2018) was a Ukrainian who was a Soviet fencer who competed in the 1956, 1960, and 1964 Olympics in the individual foil and team foil events. She won an individual silver medal and team gold medal in 1960, and a team silver medal in 1964. She also won six gold and two silver medals at the world championships of 1956–67.

== Biography ==
=== Personal life ===
She was born in Odesa, Ukraine. In 1956 Rastvorova graduated from the Russian State University of Physical Education, Sport, Youth and Tourism.

She was married to Boris Grishin, an Olympic water polo player. Their son, Yevgeny Grishin, is an Olympic champion in water polo. Her daughter, Yelena Grishina, made it to the finals of the Olympics in foil in 1992 and 1988.

Her grandson, Sergey Bida, is a world champion épée fencer. He made his Olympic debut in Tokyo, winning a silver medal. He was ranked #1 in the world in 2020. He is also a three-time European épée team champion. He moved to the United States in 2023 after the Russian invasion of Ukraine, along with his wife, Olympic épée fencer Violetta Khrapina Bida.

=== Fencing career ===
She competed in the 1956, 1960, and 1964 Olympics in the individual foil and team foil events. She won an individual silver medal and team gold medal in 1960, and a team silver medal in 1964. At the 1956 Olympics, she came in fifth in individual women's foil.

She also won six gold and two silver medals at the world championships of 1956–67, mostly in team foil (1956 London gold: foil team; 1958 Philadelphia gold: foil and foil team; 1961 Torino gold: foil team, bronze: foil; 1962 Buenos Aires silver: foil team; 1965 Paris gold: foil team; 1966 Moscow gold: foil team; 1967 Montréal silver: foil team).

After retiring from competition, she worked as a fencing coach at her club Dynamo Moscow.
