= Viacheslav Sobchenko =

Soviet water polo player

Personal information
- Born: 18 April 1949 (age 77) Stalinabad, Soviet Union

Sport
- Sport: Water polo
Medal record
Representing Soviet Union
Olympic Games
Gold medal – first place	1972 Munich	Team competition
Gold medal – first place	1980 Moscow	Team competition

Vyacheslav Georgiyevich Sobchenko (Russian: Вячеслав Георгиевич Собченко; born 18 April 1949) was a water polo player who competed for the Soviet Union in the 1972 and the 1980 Summer Olympics. He played for the Trud team (Moscow) and the Navy CSK.

== See also ==
- Soviet Union men's Olympic water polo team records and statistics
- List of Olympic champions in men's water polo
- List of Olympic medalists in water polo (men)
- List of men's Olympic water polo tournament goalkeepers
