= Klaus Schulze (water polo) =

German water polo player

Personal information
- Nationality: German
- Born: 17 October 1936 (age 88); Leipzig, Germany

Sport
- Sport: Water polo

Klaus Schulze (born 17 October 1936) is a German water polo player. He competed in the men's tournament at the 1964 Summer Olympics.
