= Sami El-Sayed =

Egyptian water polo player (born 1940)

Personal information
- Nationality: Egyptian
- Born: 21 October 1940 (age 84)

Sport
- Sport: Water polo

Sami El-Sayed (born 21 October 1940) is an Egyptian water polo player. He competed in the men's tournament at the 1964 Summer Olympics.
