= Hubert Höhne =

German water polo player

Personal information
- Nationality: German
- Born: 29 November 1938 (age 86); Magdeburg, Germany

Sport
- Sport: Water polo

Hubert Höhne (born 29 November 1938) is a German water polo player. He competed in the men's tournament at the 1964 Summer Olympics.
