= Keisuke Satsuki =

Japanese water polo player

Personal information
- Nationality: Japanese
- Born: 6 May 1941 (age 83)

Sport
- Sport: Water polo

Keisuke Satsuki (皐月 啓左, Satsuki Keisuke, born 6 May 1941) is a Japanese water polo player. He competed in the men's tournament at the 1964 Summer Olympics.
