= Mamadou Amir =

Egyptian water polo player (born 1946)

Personal information
- Nationality: Egyptian
- Born: 26 May 1946 (age 79)

Sport
- Sport: Water polo

Mamadou Amir (born 26 May 1946) is an Egyptian water polo player. He competed in the men's tournament at the 1964 Summer Olympics.
