= Bill McAtee =

Australian water polo player

Personal information
- Nationality: Australian
- Born: 11 April 1943
- Died: 2008 (aged 64–65)

Sport
- Sport: Water polo

Bill McAtee (11 April 1943 – 2008) was an Australian water polo player. He competed in the men's tournament at the 1964 Summer Olympics.
