= Edgar Thiele =

German water polo player

Personal information
- Nationality: German
- Born: 5 February 1938 (age 87); Berlin, Germany

Sport
- Sport: Water polo

Edgar Thiele (born 5 February 1938) is a German water polo player. He competed in the men's tournament at the 1964 Summer Olympics.
