= Eduard Egorov =

Soviet water polo player

Personal information
- Born: 7 January 1940 (age 86)

Sport
- Sport: Water polo
Medal record
Representing Soviet Union
Olympic Games
Bronze medal – third place	1964 Tokyo	Team competition

Eduard Vasilevich Egorov (Russian: Эдуард Васильевич Егоров; born 7 January 1940) is a Russian water polo player who competed for the Soviet Union in the 1964 Summer Olympics.

In 1964 he was a member of the Soviet team which won the bronze medal in the Olympic water polo tournament. He played two matches as goalkeeper.

== See also ==
- Soviet Union men's Olympic water polo team records and statistics
- List of Olympic medalists in water polo (men)
- List of men's Olympic water polo tournament goalkeepers
