= Joseph Stappers =

Belgian water polo player

Personal information
- Nationality: Belgian
- Born: 13 June 1942 (age 82); Antwerp, Belgium

Sport
- Sport: Water polo

Joseph Stappers (born 13 June 1942) is a Belgian water polo player. He competed in the men's tournament at the 1964 Summer Olympics.
