= Freddy Rens =

Belgian field hockey player

Personal information
- Nationality: Belgian
- Born: 25 December 1936 (age 89) Brussels, Belgium

Sport
- Sport: Field hockey

Freddy Rens (born 25 December 1936) is a Belgian field hockey player. He competed at the 1960 Summer Olympics and the 1964 Summer Olympics.
