= Vladimir Semyonov (water polo) =

Soviet water polo player

Personal information
- Born: 10 May 1938 Moscow, Soviet Union
- Died: 21 November 2016 (aged 78) Moscow, Soviet Union

Sport
- Sport: Water polo
Medal record
Representing Soviet Union
Olympic Games
Silver medal – second place	1960 Rome	Team competition
Silver medal – second place	1968 Mexico City	Team competition
Bronze medal – third place	1964 Tokyo	Team competition

Vladimir Viktorovich Semyonov (Russian: Владимир Викторович Семёнов, 10 May 1938 – 21 November 2016) was a Russian water polo player who competed for the Soviet Union in the 1960 Summer Olympics, in the 1964 Summer Olympics, and in the 1968 Summer Olympics. In 1960 he was a member of the Soviet team which won the silver medal. He played five matches. Four years later he won the bronze medal with the Soviet team in the water polo competition at the 1964 Games. He played all six matches and scored four goals. At the 1968 Games he was part of the Soviet team which won again a silver medal in the Olympic water polo tournament. He played all eight matches and scored four goals.

== See also ==
- Soviet Union men's Olympic water polo team records and statistics
- List of Olympic medalists in water polo (men)
