= Boris Grishin =

Russian water polo player

Personal information
- Full name: Boris Dmitriyevich Grishin
- Born: 4 January 1938 (age 88) Moscow, Soviet Union
Medal record
Men's water polo
Representing the Soviet Union
Olympic Games
Silver medal – second place	1968 Mexico City	Team competition
Bronze medal – third place	1964 Tokio	Team competition

Boris Dmitriyevich Grishin (Russian: Борис Дмитриевич Гришин, born 4 January 1938 in Moscow) is a Russian water polo player who competed for the Soviet Union in the 1964 and the 1968 Summer Olympics. He was married to champion Olympic fencer Valentina Rastvorova. His daughter, Yelena Grishina, is also an Olympic fencer.

Sergey Bida, Yelena's son and Boris's grandson, is a world champion fencer. He made his Olympic debut in Tokyo, winning a silver medal. He was ranked #1 in the world in 2020. He is also a three-time European épée team champion. He moved to the United States in 2023 after the Russian invasion of Ukraine, along with his wife, Olympic épée fencer Violetta Khrapina Bida.

Later Grishin was a water polo coach. His son Yevgeny was also a successful water polo player.

== See also ==
- List of Olympic medalists in water polo (men)
