= Cornel Mărculescu =

Romanian water polo player

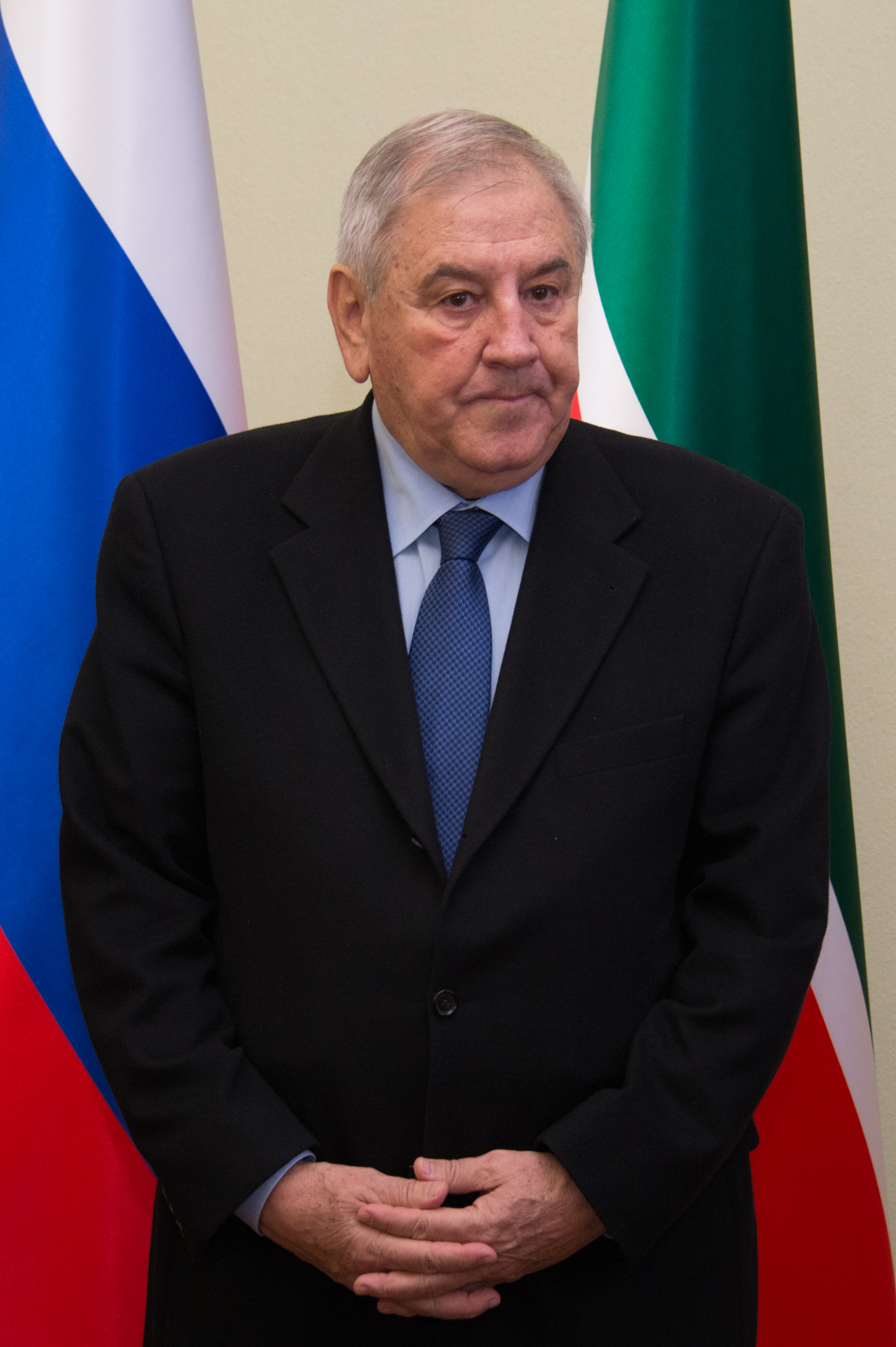

Personal information
- Nationality: Romanian
- Born: 17 July 1941 (age 83); Bucharest, Romania

Sport
- Sport: Water polo

Cornel Mărculescu (born 17 July 1941) is a Romanian former water polo player. He competed in the men's tournament at the 1964 Summer Olympics.

Mărculescu later was a referee, officiating the final of the 1972 Olympic water polo tournament. He then worked as the technical director for Spanish Swimming Federation for nearly 10 years. In 1986, he became the executive director of FINA, where he served until 2021.
