= Zoltán Dömötör =

Hungarian water polo player and swimmer (1935–2019)

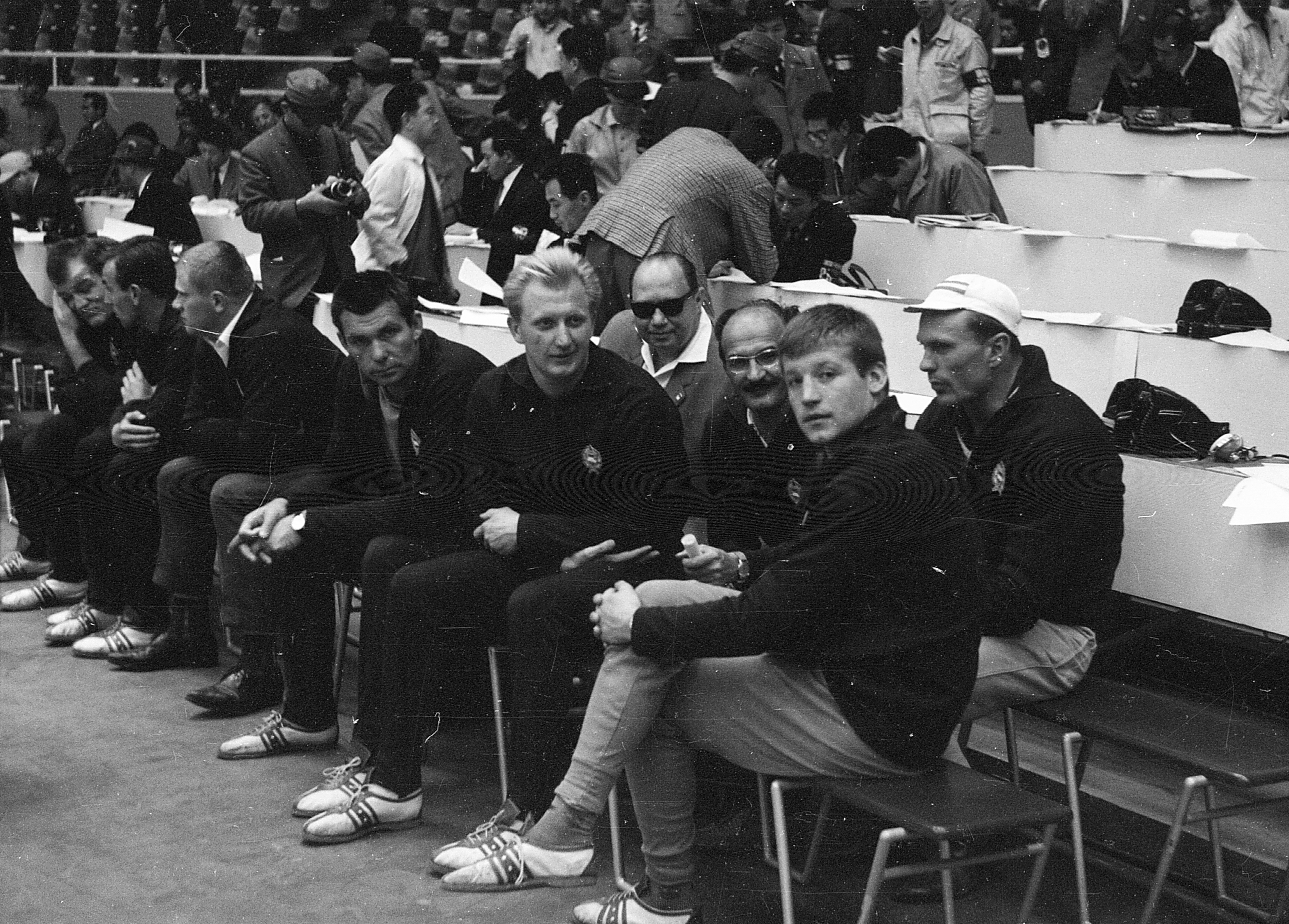
- First row from the right: László Felkai, Zoltán Dömötör, Ottó Boros,?, Miklós Ambrus,? In the second row from the right is the second cameraman József Csőke.

Personal information
- Born: 21 August 1935 Budapest, Hungary
- Died: 20 November 2019 (aged 84)
- Height: 186 cm (6 ft 1 in)
- Weight: 84 kg (185 lb)

Sport
- Sport: Water polo
- Club: Újpesti TE
Medal record
Men's Water Polo
Representing Hungary
Olympic Games
Bronze medal – third place	1960 Rome	Team competition
Gold medal – first place	1964 Tokyo	Team competition
Bronze medal – third place	1968 Mexico City	Team competition
Men's swimming
European Championships
Gold medal – first place	1954 Turin	4×200 m freestyle

Zoltán Dömötör (21 August 1935 – 20 November 2019) was a Hungarian swimmer and water polo player who competed in the 1960 Summer Olympics, in the 1964 Summer Olympics, and in the 1968 Summer Olympics.

He was born in Budapest.

Dömötör was part of the Hungarian water polo team which won the bronze medal in the 1960 tournament. He played six matches and scored nine goals.

Four years later he was a member of the Hungarian team which won the gold medal in the 1964 Olympic tournament. He played all six matches and scored seven goals. He scored the final goal in the last game of the tournament against the Soviet Union to set the result 5-2 which secured the gold medal for Hungary on a better goal difference. The radio commentary of that goal by the legendary György Szepesi is often referred as one of the most memorable moments in Hungarian sports history with Szepesi repeatedly yelling "lőj!" ("shoot!") while Dömötör pump faked the ball for several seconds before finally lobbing it over the sinking goalkeeper.

At the 1968 Games he won his second bronze medal with the Hungarian team. He played all eight matches and scored two goals.

== See also ==
- Hungary men's Olympic water polo team records and statistics
- List of Olympic champions in men's water polo
- List of Olympic medalists in water polo (men)
