= Vladimir Kuznetsov (water polo) =

Soviet water polo player

Personal information
- Born: 30 June 1937 (age 89) Moscow, Soviet Union

Sport
- Sport: Water polo
Medal record
Representing Soviet Union
Olympic Games
Bronze medal – third place	1964 Tokyo	Team competition

Vladimir Vladimirovich Kuznetsov (Russian: Владимир Владимирович Кузнецов, born 30 June 1937) is a Russian water polo player who competed for the Soviet Union in the 1964 Summer Olympics.

In 1964, he was a member of the Soviet team that won the bronze medal in the Olympic water polo tournament. He played in all six matches and scored two goals.

== See also ==
- List of Olympic medalists in water polo (men)
