= Zlatko Šimenc =

Croatian water polo player (1938–2026)

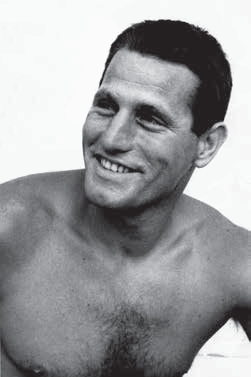
- Šimenc in the 1960s

Personal information
- Born: 29 November 1938 Zagreb, Sava Banovina, Kingdom of Yugoslavia (modern-day Croatia)
- Died: 17 March 2026 (aged 87)
- Height: 1.86 m (6 ft 1 in)
- Weight: 88 kg (194 lb)

Sport
- Sport: Water polo
Medal record
Men's water polo
Representing Yugoslavia
Olympic Games
Silver medal – second place	1964 Tokyo	Team
European Championships
Silver medal – second place	1958 Budapest	Team
Silver medal – second place	1962 Leipzig	Team
Bronze medal – third place	1966 Utrecht	Team
Mediterranean Games
Gold medal – first place	1959 Beirut	Team
Silver medal – second place	1963 Naples	Team

Zlatko Šimenc (29 November 1938 – 17 March 2026) was a Croatian water polo player and coach (1969–1975) of Slovenian origin. He was part of the Yugoslav team that won a silver medal at the 1964 Olympics and placed fourth in 1960. He won three more medals at the European championships in 1958–1966.

== Biography ==
Šimenc's parents moved from Slovenia to Croatia before he was born. They had three sons and one daughter, with Zlatko being the youngest child. He took up swimming aged 11, and in his twenties changed to water polo and handball. He trained as a water polo defender in the summer and as a handball striker in the winter, and won national titles in both sports with his club Mladost. Between 1955 and 1975, he played 101 water polo and 24 handball matches for the national Yugoslav teams.

In 1958, Šimenc enrolled to study law, but next year changed to the newly established in Zagreb institute of physical education, and graduated in 1966. He later earned a master's degree in social sciences and defended a PhD in kinesiology. Since 1966 until retirement, he worked at the Department of Team Sports of the University of Zagreb, and published ca. 60 scientific papers and books on handball and water polo. In parallel, he served as a sports official at the Yugoslav (1980–82) and Croatian (1992–96) water polo federations and was a member of the Croatian Olympic Committee (1991–95). His son Dubravko also became an Olympic medalist in water polo, while his daughter Iva is a coach and former competitor in synchronized swimming.

Šimenc died on 17 March 2026, at the age of 87.

== See also ==
- List of Olympic medalists in water polo (men)
