= Dieter Vohs =

German water polo player

Personal information
- Nationality: German
- Born: 18 June 1935 (age 89); Magdeburg, Germany

Sport
- Sport: Water polo

Dieter Vohs (born 18 June 1935) is a German water polo player. He competed in the men's tournament at the 1964 Summer Olympics.
