= Jacques Caufrier =

Belgian water polo player

Personal information
- Nationality: Belgium
- Born: 15 February 1942 Merelbeke, Belgium
- Died: 2 August 2012 (aged 70)
- Height: 1.88 m (6 ft 2 in)
- Weight: 84 kg (185 lb)

Sport
- Sport: Water polo
National team
- Years: Team
- ?-?: Belgium

Jacques Caufrier (15 February 1942 – 2 August 2012) was a Belgian male water polo player. He was a member of the Belgium men's national water polo team. He competed with the team at the 1960 Summer Olympics and the 1964 Summer Olympics.
