= Jean-Louis le Clerc =

Belgian hockey player

Personal information
- Nationality: Belgian
- Born: 19 January 1940 (age 86) Uccle, Belgium

Sport
- Sport: Field hockey

Jean-Louis le Clerc (born 19 January 1940) is a Belgian former field hockey player. He competed at the 1964 Summer Olympics and the 1968 Summer Olympics.
