= Franz Lorette =

Belgian field hockey player (1935–2016)

Personal information
- Nationality: Belgian
- Born: 15 June 1935 Molenbeek-Saint-Jean, Belgium
- Died: 21 April 2016 (aged 80) Chaumont-Gistoux, Belgium

Sport
- Sport: Field hockey

Franz Lorette (15 June 1935 – 21 April 2016) was a Belgian field hockey player. He competed at the 1956 Summer Olympics, the 1960 Summer Olympics and the 1964 Summer Olympics.
