= Jacques Vanderstappen =

Belgian field hockey player

Personal information
- Nationality: Belgian
- Born: 1 September 1930 Ixelles, Belgium
- Died: 2016 (aged 85–86)

Sport
- Sport: Field hockey

Jacques Vanderstappen (1 September 1930 – 2016) was a Belgian field hockey player. He competed at the 1952, 1956, 1960 and the 1964 Summer Olympics.
