= Nicky Barnes (water polo) =

Australian water polo player

Personal information
- Nationality: Australian
- Born: 28 August 1941
- Died: 2008 (aged 66–67)

Sport
- Sport: Water polo

Nicky Barnes (28 August 1941 – 2008) was an Australian water polo player. He competed at the 1964 Summer Olympics and the 1972 Summer Olympics.
