= Ante Nardelli =

Croatian water polo player

Personal information
- Full name: Antun Nardelli
- Nationality: Yugoslavia
- Born: 15 April 1937 Split, Kingdom of Yugoslavia
- Died: 5 September 1995 (aged 58) Zagreb, Croatia
- Height: 1.81 m (5 ft 11 in)
- Weight: 78 kg (172 lb)

Sport
- Sport: Water polo

Senior clubs
- Years: Team
- ?-?: Jadran Split
National team
- Years: Team
- ?-?: Yugoslavia
Medal record
Representing Yugoslavia
Olympic Games
Silver medal – second place	1964 Tokyo	Team competition

Antun "Ante" Nardelli (Aнтон "Анте" Нардели, 15 April 1937 – 5 September 1995) was a Croatian male water polo player. He was a member of the Yugoslavia men's national water polo team. He won the silver medal at the 1964 Summer Olympics. He was also part of the team at the 1960 Summer Olympics, playing seven matches and scoring five goals. On club level he played for Jadran Split in Yugoslavia.

== See also ==
- List of Olympic medalists in water polo (men)
