= Božidar Stanišić =

Yugoslav water polo player

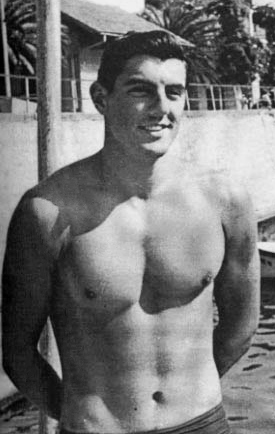

Personal information
- Born: 21 October 1936 Herceg Novi, Zeta Banovina, Kingdom of Yugoslavia
- Died: 3 January 2014 (aged 77) Herceg Novi, Montenegro
- Height: 187 cm (6 ft 2 in)
- Weight: 88 kg (194 lb)

Sport
- Sport: Water polo
- Club: PKV Jadran; VK Bijela
Medal record
Representing Yugoslavia
Olympic Games
Silver medal – second place	1964 Tokyo	Team
European Water Polo Championship
Silver medal – second place	1958 Budapest	Team
Mediterranean Games
Gold medal – first place	1959 Beirut	Team
Silver medal – second place	1963 Naples	Team

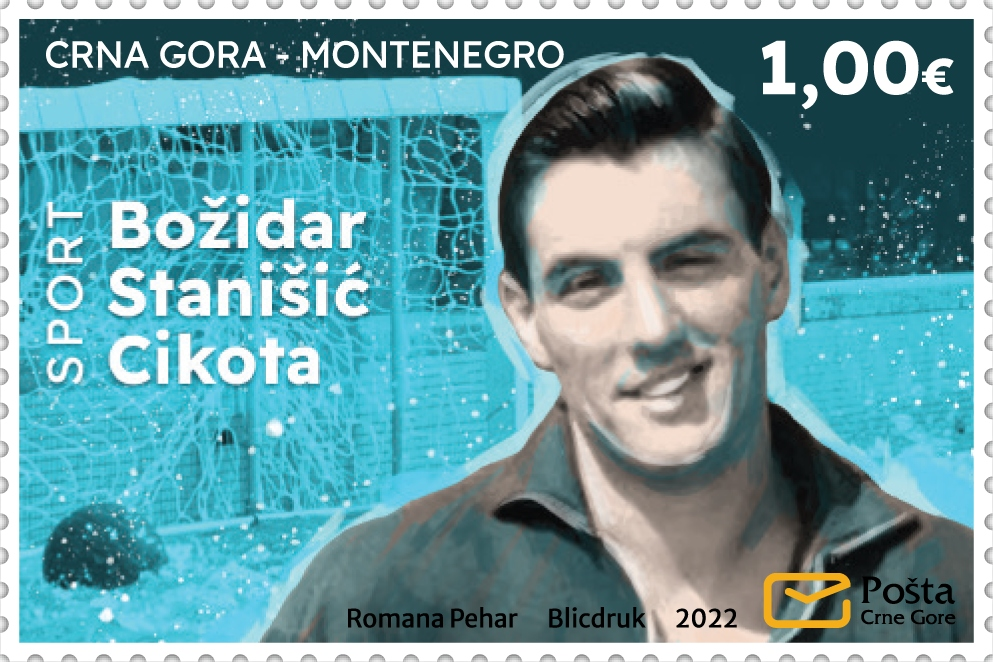
Stanišić on a 2022 stamp of Montenegro

Božidar "Cikota" Stanišić (21 October 1936 – 3 January 2014) was a water polo player from Montenegro. He was part of the Yugoslav teams that won a silver medal at the 1964 Olympics and placed fourth in 1960. He won another silver medal at the 1958 European Championships.

Stanišić learned to swim aged 14. Two years later started playing water polo for PKV Jadran and won with them the national title in 1958 and 1959; he later played for VK Bijela and coached both teams. Stanišić was a lawyer by profession. He was voted the Montenegrin Athlete of the Year a record four times, in 1959, 1961, 1963 and 1965.

== See also ==
- List of Olympic medalists in water polo (men)
