= Jean-Louis Roersch =

Belgian hockey player

Personal information
- Nationality: Belgian
- Born: 8 October 1936 (age 89) Ixelles, Belgium

Sport
- Sport: Field hockey

Jean-Louis Roersch (born 8 October 1936) is a Belgian field hockey player. He competed at the 1960 Summer Olympics, the 1964 Summer Olympics and the 1968 Summer Olympics.
