= Boris Popov =

Soviet water polo player

Personal information
- Born: 21 March 1941 (age 85) Moscow, Soviet Union

Sport
- Sport: Water polo
Medal record
Representing Soviet Union
Olympic Games
Bronze medal – third place	1964 Tokyo	Team competition

Boris Nikitich Popov (Russian: Борис Никитич Попов, born 21 March 1941) is a Russian water polo player who competed for the Soviet Union in the 1964 Summer Olympics.

== Career ==
In 1964 he was a member of the Soviet team which won the bronze medal in the Olympic water polo tournament. He played all six matches.

Popov is one of the most successful water polo coach in Olympic history. He led Soviet Union men's national team to win an Olympic gold medal in 1980 and a bronze medal in 1988. Four years later, he coached the Unified Team to win another bronze medal. In 4th FINA World Championships 1982 in Guayaquil, he won the gold medal in the respective water polo championship as coach of Soviet Union men's national team.
He is one of a few sportspeople who won Olympic medals in water polo as players and head coaches.

== See also ==
- Soviet Union men's Olympic water polo team records and statistics
- List of Olympic champions in men's water polo
- List of Olympic medalists in water polo (men)
- List of world champions in men's water polo
- List of members of the International Swimming Hall of Fame
