= Michel Muschs =

Belgian hockey player

Personal information
- Nationality: Belgian
- Born: 30 May 1940 (age 86) Uccle, Belgium

Sport
- Sport: Field hockey

Michel Muschs (born 30 May 1940) is a Belgian former field hockey player. He competed at the 1960 Summer Olympics and the 1964 Summer Olympics.
