= Nikolay Kuznetsov (water polo) =

Soviet water polo player

Personal information
- Born: 25 April 1931 Baku, Soviet Union
- Died: 30 August 1995 (aged 64)

Sport
- Sport: Water polo
Medal record
Representing Soviet Union
Olympic Games
Bronze medal – third place	1964 Tokyo	Team competition

Nikolay Alekseevich Kuznetsov (Azerbaijani: ?, Russian: Николай Алексеевич Кузнецов, 25 April 1931 – 30 August 1995) was an Azerbaijani water polo player who competed for the Soviet Union in the 1964 Summer Olympics.

In 1964 he was a member of the Soviet team which won the bronze medal in the Olympic water polo tournament. He played all six matches and scored one goal.

== See also ==
- List of Olympic medalists in water polo (men)
