= Frane Nonković =

Croatian water polo player (1939–2024)

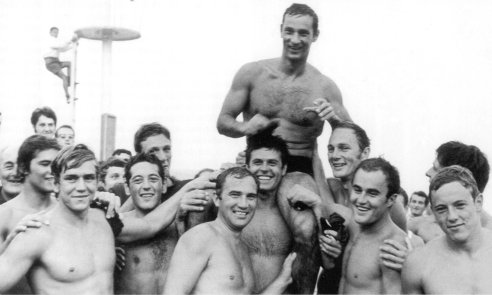
- Nonković (top) in 1970

Personal information
- Born: 25 April 1939 Metković, Littoral Banovina, Kingdom of Yugoslavia
- Died: 5 September 2023 (aged 84)
- Height: 179 cm (5 ft 10 in)
- Weight: 82 kg (181 lb)

Sport
- Sport: Water polo
- Club: VK Primorje, Rijeka
Medal record
Representing Yugoslavia
Olympic Games
Silver medal – second place	1964 Tokyo	Team competition
European Championship
Silver medal – second place	1962 Leipzig	Team competition
Mediterranean Games
Silver medal – second place	1963 Naples	Team competition

Franjo "Frane" Nonković (25 April 1939 – 5 September 2023) was a Croatian water polo player. He was part of the Yugoslav teams that won a silver medal at the 1964 Olympics. Later in the 1960s–70s he became a successful water polo coach. Nonković died on 5 September 2023, at the age of 84.

== See also ==
- List of Olympic medalists in water polo (men)
