= Yevgeny Grishin (water polo) =

Russian water polo player

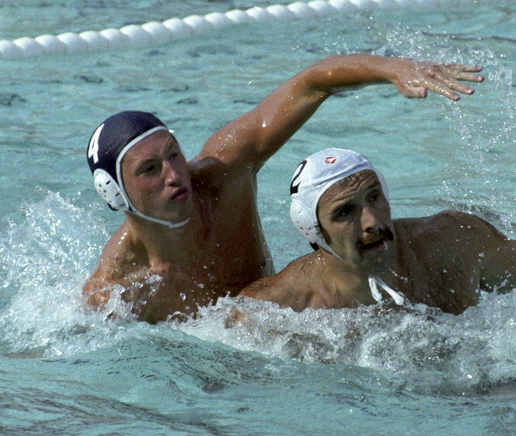
- Grishin (left) at the 1980 Olympics

Personal information
- Born: 1 October 1959 (age 66) Moscow, Russian SFSR, Soviet Union
- Height: 189 cm (6 ft 2 in)
- Weight: 93 kg (205 lb)

Sport
- Sport: Water polo
- Club: Dynamo Moscow
Medal record
Representing the Soviet Union
Olympic Games
Gold medal – first place	1980 Moscow	Team
Bronze medal – third place	1988 Seoul	Team
World Championships
Gold medal – first place	1982 Guayaquil	Team
Bronze medal – third place	1986 Madrid	Team
European Water Polo Championship
Gold medal – first place	1983 Rome	Team
Gold medal – first place	1985 Sofia	Team

Yevgeny Borisovich Grishin (Russian: Евгений Борисович Гришин, born 1 October 1959) is a retired Russian water polo defender. He was part of the Soviet teams that won gold medals at the 1980 Olympics, 1982 World Championships, and 1983 and 1985 European championships, and placed third at the 1986 World Championships and 1988 Olympics. Grishin was coached by his father Boris, who is also a retired Olympic water polo defender. His mother Valentina and sister Yelena are Olympic fencers.

His nephew, Sergey Bida, is a top-ranked épée fencer who made his Olympic debut in Tokyo, winning a silver medal. He was ranked #1 in the world in 2020. He is also a three-time European épée team champion. He moved to the United States in 2023 after the Russian invasion of Ukraine, along with his wife, Olympic épée fencer Violetta Khrapina Bida.

== See also ==
- Soviet Union men's Olympic water polo team records and statistics
- List of Olympic champions in men's water polo
- List of Olympic medalists in water polo (men)
- List of World Aquatics Championships medalists in water polo
