= Igor Grabovsky =

Soviet water polo player

Personal information
- Native name: Игорь Владимирович Грабовский
- Full name: Igor Vladimirovich Grabovsky
- Born: 2 September 1941 (age 84)
- Height: 190 cm (6 ft 3 in)
- Weight: 88 kg (194 lb)

Sport
- Sport: Water polo
Medal record
Men's Water Polo
Representing the Soviet Union
Olympic Games
Bronze medal – third place	1964 Tokyo	Team competition

Igor Vladimirovich Grabovsky (Russian: Игорь Владимирович Грабовский, born 2 September 1941) is a Russian water polo player who competed for the Soviet Union in the 1964 Summer Olympics.

In 1964 he was a member of the Soviet team which won the bronze medal in the Olympic water polo tournament. He played all six matches as goalkeeper.

== See also ==
- Soviet Union men's Olympic water polo team records and statistics
- List of Olympic medalists in water polo (men)
- List of men's Olympic water polo tournament goalkeepers
