= Hazem Kourched =

Egyptian water polo player (born 1943)

Personal information
- Nationality: Egyptian
- Born: 5 July 1943 (age 81)

Sport
- Sport: Water polo

Hazem Kourched (born 5 July 1943) is an Egyptian water polo player. He competed in the men's tournament at the 1964 Summer Olympics.
