= Roland de Neve =

Belgian cyclist

Personal information
- Born: 19 February 1944 (age 82) Drongen, Belgium
- Height: 180 cm (5 ft 11 in)
- Weight: 72 kg (159 lb)

Cycling career
- Sport: Cycling

Roland de Neve (born 19 February 1944) is a former Belgian cyclist. He competed in the team time trial and the team pursuit events at the 1964 Summer Olympics.
