= Nikolay Kalashnikov =

Soviet water polo player

Personal information
- Born: 11 October 1940 (age 85) Moscow, Soviet Union

Sport
- Sport: Water polo
Medal record
Representing Soviet Union
Olympic Games
Bronze medal – third place	1964 Tokyo	Team competition

Nikolay Fyodorovich Kalashnikov (Russian: Николай Фёдорович Калашников, born 11 October 1940) is a Russian water polo player who competed for the Soviet Union in the 1964 Summer Olympics.

In 1964 he was a member of the Soviet team which won the bronze medal in the Olympic water polo tournament. He played all six matches and scored two goals.

== See also ==
- List of Olympic medalists in water polo (men)
