= Vinko Rosić =

Croatian water polo player

Personal information
- Born: 22 May 1941 Split, Independent State of Croatia
- Died: 9 June 2006 (aged 65) Vis, Croatia
- Height: 185 cm (6 ft 1 in)
- Weight: 92 kg (203 lb)
Medal record
Men's water polo
Representing Yugoslavia
Olympic Games
Silver medal – second place	1964 Tokyo	Team

Vinko Rosić (22 May 1941 – 9 June 2006) was a Croatian water polo player. As a member of Yugoslavia's water polo team he won a silver medal at the 1964 Summer Olympics.

== See also ==
- List of Olympic medalists in water polo (men)
