= Anatol Grințescu =

Romanian water polo player

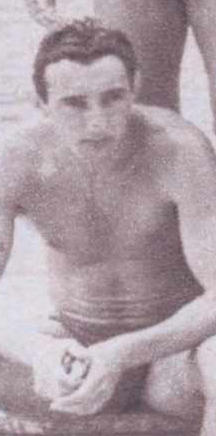
- Anatol Grințescu

Personal information
- Nationality: Romanian
- Born: 1 August 1939; Chișinău, Moldova
- Died: 2 June 2014 (aged 74); Bucharest, Romania

Sport
- Sport: Water polo

Anatol Grințescu (1 August 1939 – 2 June 2014) was a Romanian water polo player. He competed at the 1960 Summer Olympics and the 1964 Summer Olympics.
