= Alberto Spinola =

Italian water polo player

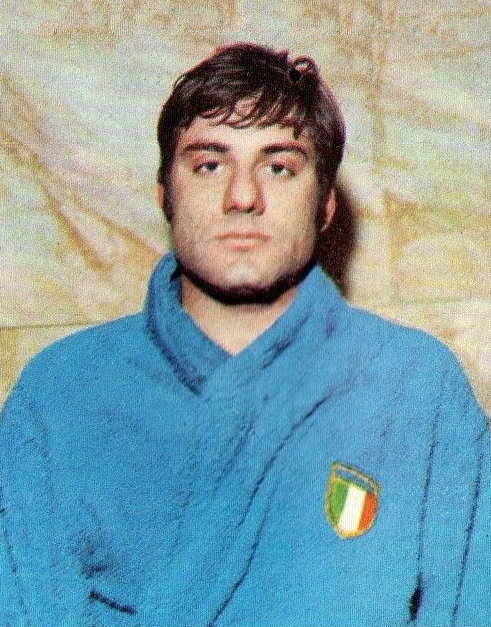

Personal information
- Born: 11 May 1943 Leça de Palmeira, Portugal
- Died: c. August 2018 (aged 75)
- Height: 1.83 m (6 ft 0 in)
- Weight: 80 kg (180 lb)

Sport
- Sport: Water polo
- Club: SS Lazio, Roma

Alberto Spinola (11 May 1943 – c. August 2018) was an Italian water polo player. He competed at the 1964 Summer Olympics and finished in fourth place with the Italian team, contributing two goals in four matches.
