= Frank D'Osterlinck =

Belgian water polo player

Personal information
- Nationality: Belgian
- Born: 30 October 1942 (age 82); Ghent, Belgium

Sport
- Sport: Water polo

Frank D'Osterlinck (born 30 October 1942) is a Belgian water polo player. He competed in the men's tournament at the 1964 Summer Olympics.
