= Ian Mills (water polo) =

Australian water polo player

Personal information
- Nationality: Australian
- Born: 22 January 1945 (age 80)

Sport
- Sport: Water polo

Ian Mills (born 22 January 1945) is an Australian water polo player. He competed at the 1964 Summer Olympics and the 1976 Summer Olympics. In 2011, he was inducted into the Water Polo Australia Hall of Fame.
