= Zenon Bortkevich =

Soviet water polo player

Olympic medal record

Men's Water Polo
Bronze medal – third place	1964 Tokyo	Team competition

Zenon Yanovich Bortkevich (Azerbaijani: ?, Russian: Зенон Янович Борткевич; 29 May 1937 – 19 August 2010) was an Azerbaijani water polo player who competed for the Soviet Union in the 1964 Summer Olympics.

In 1964 he was a member of the Soviet team which won the bronze medal in the Olympic water polo tournament. He played all six matches and scored two goals.

== See also ==
- List of Olympic medalists in water polo (men)
