= Karel De Vis =

Belgian water polo player

Personal information
- Nationality: Belgian
- Born: 29 December 1937 (age 87); Geel, Belgium

Sport
- Sport: Water polo

Karel De Vis (born 29 December 1937) is a Belgian water polo player. He competed at the 1960 Summer Olympics and the 1964 Summer Olympics.
