= Mario Cevasco =

Italian water polo player

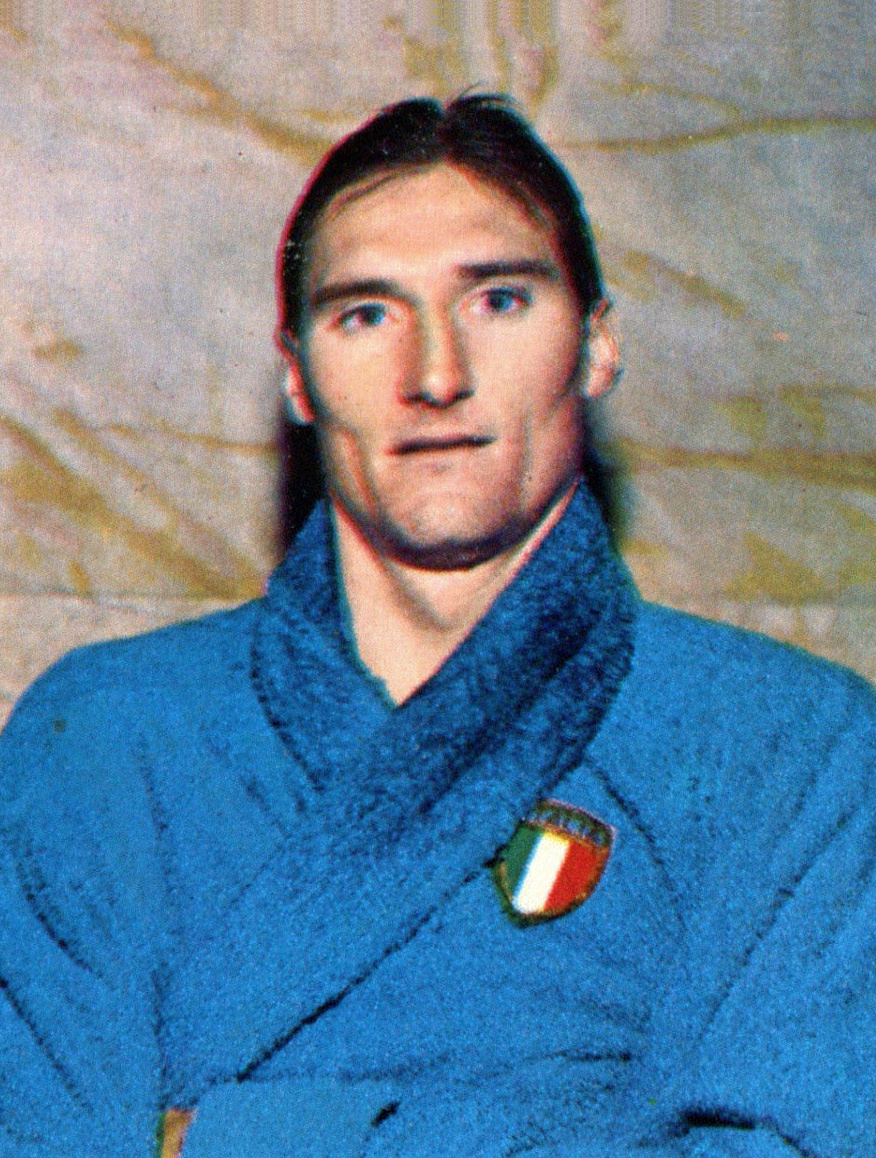

Personal information
- Born: 18 December 1938 Recco, Italy
- Died: 12 April 1999 (aged 60)
- Height: 1.81 m (5 ft 11 in)
- Weight: 75 kg (165 lb)

Sport
- Sport: Water polo
- Club: Pro Recco; Sportiva Nervi
Medal record
Representing Italy
Mediterranean Games
Bronze medal – third place	1963 Naples	Team

Mario Cevasco (18 December 1938 – 12 April 1999) was an Italian water polo player. He competed at the 1964, 1968 and 1972 Olympics and finished in fourth, fourth and sixth place, contributing three, seven and one goals, respectively.

Cevasco started playing water polo in the 1950s, but missed the 1960 Olympics because of his studies. He won 12 national titles and one international medal, a bronze at the 1963 Mediterranean Games. He died of cancer, aged 60, and was survived by wife Laura, children Nicola and Elisa, and brother Angelo.
