= Harry Vriend =

Dutch water polo player (born 1938)

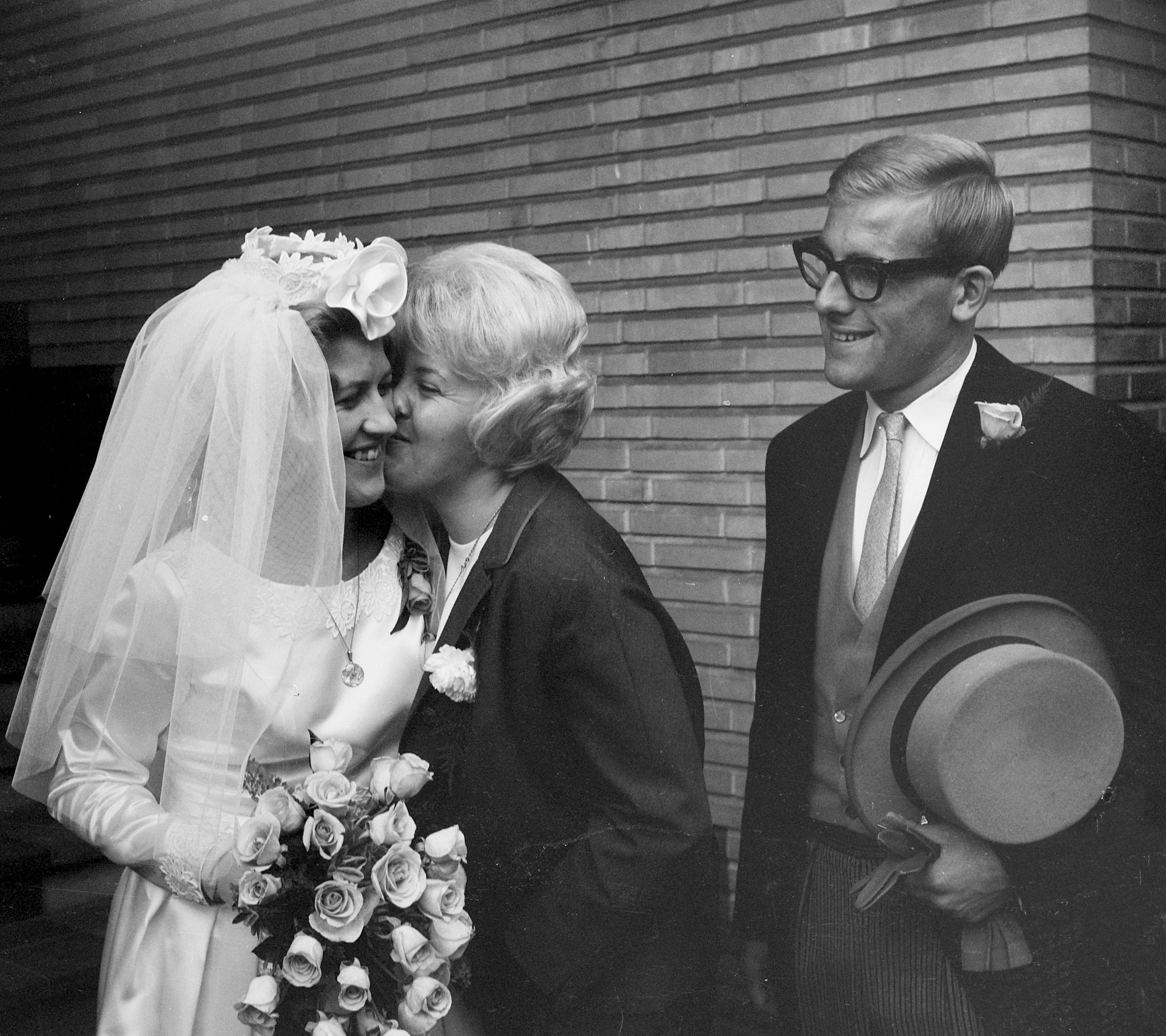
- Harry Vriend marrying Lenie de Nijs in 1963

Personal information
- Birth name: Henri Gerard Vriend
- Nationality: Dutch
- Born: 20 May 1938 (age 86); Amsterdam, North Holland
- Height: 1.76 m (5 ft 9 in)
- Weight: 74 kg (163 lb)

Sport
- Sport: Water polo

Henri "Harry" Gerard Vriend (born 20 May 1938) is a former water polo player from the Netherlands, who competed at the 1960 and 1964 Summer Olympics; in both games he finished in eighth position with the Dutch Men's Team. His brother Wim played alongside Harry at the 1964 games.

On 4 October 1963, Vriend married the Dutch swimmer Lenie de Nijs. He subsequently became a water polo coach and served as the head coach of the men's national team. Vriend later worked for NOS Studio Sport, a Dutch TV program, as a commentator.
