= Amin Abdel Rahman =

Egyptian water polo player (1941–2011)

Abdelrahman Amin
Personal information
- Nationality: Egyptian
- Born: 31 December 1941; Cairo, Egypt
- Died: 2011 (aged 69–70); Cairo, Egypt

Sport
- Sport: Water polo
- Club: Heliopolis

Abdelrahman Amin (born 31 December 1941 – 2011) was an Egyptian water polo player. He competed in the 1960 and 1964 Summer Olympics.
