= Johan Van Den Steen =

Belgian water polo player 1929–1996

Personal information
- Full name: Johan Jacques Van Den Steen
- Nationality: Belgian
- Born: 8 January 1929; Sas van Gent, Netherlands
- Died: 8 February 1996 (aged 67); Sas van Gent, Netherlands

Sport
- Sport: Water polo

Johan Van Den Steen (8 January 1929 – 8 February 1996) was a Belgian water polo player. He competed at the 1952 Summer Olympics and the 1964 Summer Olympics.
