= Leopold Heuvelmans =

Belgian cyclist

Personal information
- Born: 24 March 1945 (age 81) Meerhout, Belgium
- Height: 172 cm (5 ft 8 in)
- Weight: 72 kg (159 lb)

Cycling career
- Sport: Cycling

Leopold Heuvelmans (born 24 March 1945) is a former Belgian cyclist. He competed in the team time trial and the team pursuit events at the 1964 Summer Olympics.
