= Aurel Zahan =

Romanian water polo player

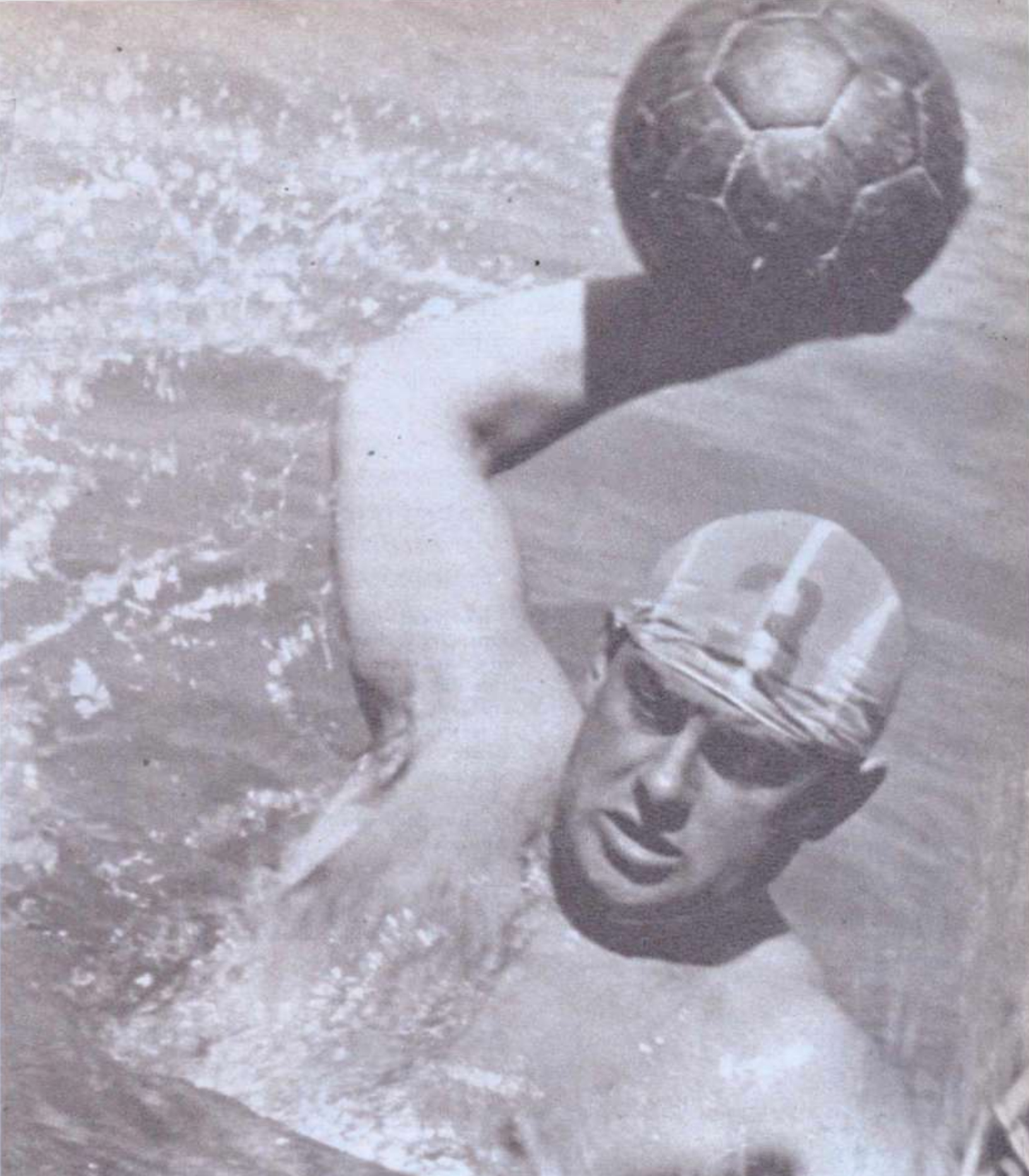
- Zahan in 1968

Personal information
- Nationality: Romanian
- Born: 8 August 1938 Bucharest, Romania
- Died: 2010 (aged 71–72)

Sport
- Sport: Water polo

Aurel Zahan (8 August 1938 – 2010) was a Romanian water polo player. He competed at the 1956 Summer Olympics, the 1960 Summer Olympics and the 1964 Summer Olympics.

== See also ==
- Romania men's Olympic water polo team records and statistics
