= Roger De Wilde =

Belgian water polo player (1940–2019)

Personal information
- Nationality: Belgian
- Born: 5 April 1940 Ghent, Belgium
- Died: 26 December 2019 (aged 79) Ghent, Belgium

Sport
- Sport: Water polo

Roger De Wilde (5 April 1940 – 26 December 2019) was a Belgian water polo player. He competed at the 1960 Summer Olympics and the 1964 Summer Olympics with the Belgian men's water polo team, finishing joint 13th in 1960 and seventh in 1964.
