= Nicolas Dumont (water polo) =

Belgian water polo player (born 1940)

Personal information
- Nationality: Belgian
- Born: 6 June 1940 (age 84); Brussels, Belgium

Sport
- Sport: Water polo

Nicolas Dumont (born 6 June 1940) is a Belgian water polo player. He competed at the 1960 Summer Olympics and the 1964 Summer Olympics.
