= Wim Vriend =

Dutch water polo player (1941–2021)

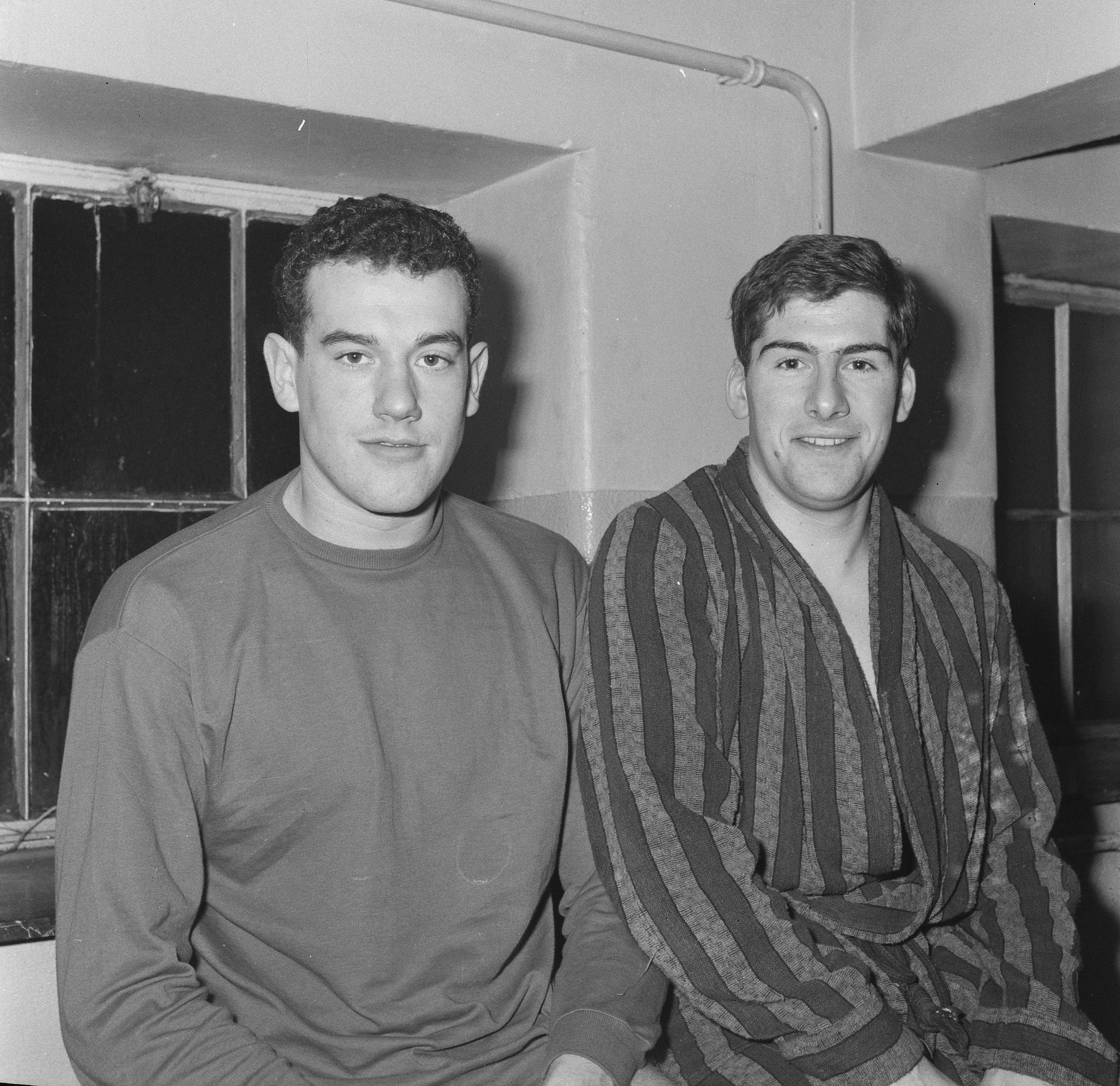
- Wim Vriend in 1964

Personal information
- Nationality: Dutch
- Born: 9 November 1941; Amsterdam, Netherlands
- Died: 30 September 2021 (aged 79); Amsterdam, Netherlands
- Height: 1.76 m (5 ft 9 in)
- Weight: 72 kg (159 lb)

Sport
- Sport: Water polo
- Club: Het Y, Amsterdam

Willem "Wim" Jan Frederik Vriend (9 November 1941 – 30 September 2021) was a water polo player from the Netherlands, who finished in eighth position with the Dutch Men's Team at the 1964 Summer Olympics in Tokyo, Japan. His elder brother Harry was also a member of that team.

Vriend died on 30 September 2021, at the age of 79.
