= Léon Pickers =

Belgian water polo player

Personal information
- Nationality: Belgian
- Born: 27 July 1937; Etterbeek, Belgium
- Died: 25 February 1968 (aged 30)

Sport
- Sport: Water polo

Léon Pickers (27 July 1937 – 25 February 1968) was a Belgian water polo player. He competed at the 1960 Summer Olympics and the 1964 Summer Olympics.
