= Water polo at the 1964 Summer Olympics =

Coordinates: 35.6797°N 139.7124°E

Water polo at the Games of the XVIII Olympiad
- Venues: Tokyo Metropolitan Indoor Swimming Pool
- Date: 11–18 October 1964
- Competitors: 137 from 13 nations

Medalists
1st place, gold medalist(s)		Hungary
2nd place, silver medalist(s)		Yugoslavia
3rd place, bronze medalist(s)		Soviet Union

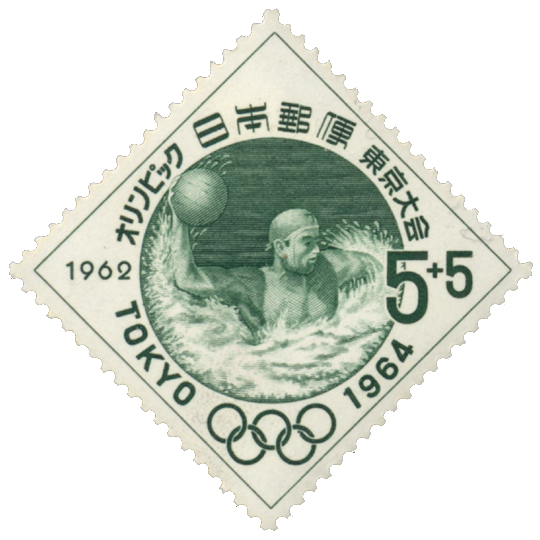
Water polo at the 1964 Olympics on a stamp of Japan

Water polo at the 1964 Summer Olympics was held at the Yoyogi National Gymnasium in Shibuya, Tokyo. The gymnasium was built in 1961-1964 as the first indoor pool for Olympic water polo; it also hosted all swimming and diving events and could accommodate over 13,000 people.

In the water polo tournament, two teams from each of the four preliminary groups advanced to two semifinals, and their four winners competed for the medals. The scores from the preliminary rounds were taken into account in the semifinals, and the scores from the semifinals were taken into account in the finals.

== Qualification ==
Qualification	Date	Host	Berths	Qualified
Host nation	26 May 1959	(West Germany) Munich	1	Japan
1960 Summer Olympics	25 August–3 September 1960	(Italy) Rome	5	Italy; Soviet Union; Hungary; Netherlands; Romania
European Water Polo Championship	19–25 August 1962	(East Germany) Leipzig	~~3~~ 2	East Germany; Belgium; ~~Sweden~~
1963 Pan American Games	24 April–4 May 1963	(Brazil) São Paulo	~~3~~ 2	United States; Brazil; ~~Argentina~~
Africa	1963		1	Egypt
Oceania	1963		1	Australia
Total			~~14~~ 12	

== Medal summary ==
Games	Gold	Silver	Bronze
Men’s tournament	Hungary; Miklós Ambrus; László Felkai; János Konrád; Zoltán Dömötör; Tivadar Kanizsa; Péter Rusorán; György Kárpáti; Mihály Mayer; Dezső Gyarmati; Dénes Pócsik; András Bodnár	Yugoslavia; Milan Muškatirović; Ivo Trumbić; Vinko Rosić; Zlatko Šimenc; Božidar Stanišić; Ante Nardelli; Zoran Janković; Mirko Sandić; Frane Nonković; Ozren Bonačić; Karlo Stipanić	Soviet Union; Igor Grabovsky; Vladimir Kuznetsov; Boris Grishin; Boris Popov; Nikolay Kalashnikov; Zenon Bortkevich; Nikolay Kuznetsov; Vladimir Semyonov; Viktor Ageyev; Leonid Osipov; Eduard Egorov

== Results ==
=== First round ===
==== Group A ====
Pos	Team	Pld	W	D	L	GF	GA	GD	Pts	Qualification
1	Italy	2	2	0	0	9	6	+3	4	Semifinals
2	Romania	2	1	0	1	12	8	+4	2	Semifinals
3	Japan	2	0	0	2	7	14	−7	0	

Source: Official Report p. 673

11 October 1964; 11:10	Official Report p.675	Italy	4–3	Romania	Tokyo Metropolitan Indoor Swimming Pool; Referees: J. Dirnweber (AUT)
11 October 1964; 11:10	Official Report p.675	Score by quarters: 2–0, 0–2, 2–0, 0–1			Tokyo Metropolitan Indoor Swimming Pool; Referees: J. Dirnweber (AUT)
11 October 1964; 11:10	Official Report p.675	Pizzo 3	Goals	Grinţescu 2	Tokyo Metropolitan Indoor Swimming Pool; Referees: J. Dirnweber (AUT)

12 October 1964; 10:00	Official Report p.677	Italy	5–3	Japan	Tokyo Metropolitan Indoor Swimming Pool; Referees: J. Brandi (HUN)
12 October 1964; 10:00	Official Report p.677	Score by quarters: 3–1, 1–0, 0–1, 1–1			Tokyo Metropolitan Indoor Swimming Pool; Referees: J. Brandi (HUN)
12 October 1964; 10:00	Official Report p.677	Pizzo 2	Goals	Takeuchi 2	Tokyo Metropolitan Indoor Swimming Pool; Referees: J. Brandi (HUN)

13 October 1964; 11:10	Official Report p.680	Japan	4–9	Romania	Tokyo Metropolitan Indoor Swimming Pool; Referees: H.G. De Kok (NED)
13 October 1964; 11:10	Official Report p.680	Score by quarters: 1–1, 2–3, 0–2, 1–3			Tokyo Metropolitan Indoor Swimming Pool; Referees: H.G. De Kok (NED)
13 October 1964; 11:10	Official Report p.680	Shimizu 2	Goals	Zahan 3	Tokyo Metropolitan Indoor Swimming Pool; Referees: H.G. De Kok (NED)

==== Group B ====
Pos	Team	Pld	W	D	L	GF	GA	GD	Pts	Qualification
1	Soviet Union	2	2	0	0	9	2	+7	4	Semifinals
2	Germany	2	1	0	1	5	4	+1	2	Semifinals
3	Australia	2	0	0	2	1	9	−8	0	

Source: Official Report p. 673

11 October 1964; 16:30	Official Report p.675	Soviet Union	6–0	Australia	Tokyo Metropolitan Indoor Swimming Pool; Referees: M. Manguillot (ESP)
11 October 1964; 16:30	Official Report p.675	Score by quarters: 1–0, 1–0, 2–0, 2–0			Tokyo Metropolitan Indoor Swimming Pool; Referees: M. Manguillot (ESP)
11 October 1964; 16:30	Official Report p.675	Kuznetsov, Semyonov 2	Goals	None	Tokyo Metropolitan Indoor Swimming Pool; Referees: M. Manguillot (ESP)

12 October 1964; 11:10	Official Report p.677	Soviet Union	3–2	Germany	Tokyo Metropolitan Indoor Swimming Pool; Referees: J. Bauwens (BEL)
12 October 1964; 11:10	Official Report p.677	Score by quarters: 1–2, 0–0, 1–0, 1–0			Tokyo Metropolitan Indoor Swimming Pool; Referees: J. Bauwens (BEL)
12 October 1964; 11:10	Official Report p.677	Bortkevich 2	Goals	Vohs 2	Tokyo Metropolitan Indoor Swimming Pool; Referees: J. Bauwens (BEL)

13 October 1964; 16:30	Official Report p.680	Australia	1–3	Germany	Tokyo Metropolitan Indoor Swimming Pool; Referees: C.H. Angerhausen (BEL)
13 October 1964; 16:30	Official Report p.680	Score by quarters: 0–1, 1–0, 0–2, 0–0			Tokyo Metropolitan Indoor Swimming Pool; Referees: C.H. Angerhausen (BEL)
13 October 1964; 16:30	Official Report p.680	Mills 1	Goals	three players 1	Tokyo Metropolitan Indoor Swimming Pool; Referees: C.H. Angerhausen (BEL)

==== Group C ====
Pos	Team	Pld	W	D	L	GF	GA	GD	Pts	Qualification
1	Yugoslavia	3	3	0	0	17	3	+14	6	Semifinals
2	Netherlands	3	2	0	1	11	13	−2	4	Semifinals
3	United States	3	1	0	2	12	9	+3	2	
4	Brazil	3	0	0	3	3	18	−15	0	

Source: Official Report p. 673

11 October 1964; 10:00	Official Report p.674	Brazil	2–3	Netherlands	Tokyo Metropolitan Indoor Swimming Pool; Referees: E. Semenov (URS)
11 October 1964; 10:00	Official Report p.674	Score by quarters: 1–1, 0–1, 0–0, 1–1			Tokyo Metropolitan Indoor Swimming Pool; Referees: E. Semenov (URS)
11 October 1964; 10:00	Official Report p.674	Szabo, dos Santos 1	Goals	three players 1	Tokyo Metropolitan Indoor Swimming Pool; Referees: E. Semenov (URS)

11 October 1964; 18:50	Official Report p.676	Yugoslavia	2–1	United States	Tokyo Metropolitan Indoor Swimming Pool; Referees: A. Fuchs (BEL)
11 October 1964; 18:50	Official Report p.676	Score by quarters: 1–1, 0–0, 0–0, 1–0			Tokyo Metropolitan Indoor Swimming Pool; Referees: A. Fuchs (BEL)
11 October 1964; 18:50	Official Report p.676	Janković, Rosić 1	Goals	Cole 1	Tokyo Metropolitan Indoor Swimming Pool; Referees: A. Fuchs (BEL)

12 October 1964; 17:40	Official Report p.678	Yugoslavia	7–2	Netherlands	Tokyo Metropolitan Indoor Swimming Pool; Referees: A. Costa (ITA)
12 October 1964; 17:40	Official Report p.678	Score by quarters: 1–0, 2–2, 1–0, 3–0			Tokyo Metropolitan Indoor Swimming Pool; Referees: A. Costa (ITA)
12 October 1964; 17:40	Official Report p.678	Nardeli, Rosić 2	Goals	Leenards, Muller 1	Tokyo Metropolitan Indoor Swimming Pool; Referees: A. Costa (ITA)

12 October 1964; 18:50	Official Report p.679	United States	7–1	Brazil	Tokyo Metropolitan Indoor Swimming Pool; Referees: M. Natori (JPN)
12 October 1964; 18:50	Official Report p.679	Score by quarters: 1–0, 1–0, 3–0, 2–1			Tokyo Metropolitan Indoor Swimming Pool; Referees: M. Natori (JPN)
12 October 1964; 18:50	Official Report p.679	Crawford 3	Goals	Szabo 1	Tokyo Metropolitan Indoor Swimming Pool; Referees: M. Natori (JPN)

13 October 1964; 10:00	Official Report p.679	Yugoslavia	8–0	Brazil	Tokyo Metropolitan Indoor Swimming Pool; Referees: Y.E. El Din (UAR)
13 October 1964; 10:00	Official Report p.679	Score by quarters: 3–0, 0–0, 4–0, 1–0			Tokyo Metropolitan Indoor Swimming Pool; Referees: Y.E. El Din (UAR)
13 October 1964; 10:00	Official Report p.679	Sandić 2	Goals	none	Tokyo Metropolitan Indoor Swimming Pool; Referees: Y.E. El Din (UAR)

13 October 1964; 18:50	Official Report p.681	United States	4–6	Netherlands	Tokyo Metropolitan Indoor Swimming Pool; Referees: J. Dirnweber (AUT)
13 October 1964; 18:50	Official Report p.681	Score by quarters: 2–2, 0–3, 0–0, 2–1			Tokyo Metropolitan Indoor Swimming Pool; Referees: J. Dirnweber (AUT)
13 October 1964; 18:50	Official Report p.681	four players 1	Goals	W. Vriend 2	Tokyo Metropolitan Indoor Swimming Pool; Referees: J. Dirnweber (AUT)

==== Group D ====
Pos	Team	Pld	W	D	L	GF	GA	GD	Pts	Qualification
1	Hungary	2	2	0	0	16	1	+15	4	Semifinals
2	Belgium	2	1	0	1	8	10	−2	2	Semifinals
3	Egypt	2	0	0	2	6	19	−13	0	

Source: Official Report p. 673

11 October 1964; 17:40	Official Report p.676	Hungary	11–1	Egypt	Tokyo Metropolitan Indoor Swimming Pool; Referees: M.J. Segura (ARG)
11 October 1964; 17:40	Official Report p.676	Score by quarters: 2–0, 3–0, 2–1, 4–0			Tokyo Metropolitan Indoor Swimming Pool; Referees: M.J. Segura (ARG)
11 October 1964; 17:40	Official Report p.676	Felkai, Rusorán 2	Goals	Abdel Rahman 1	Tokyo Metropolitan Indoor Swimming Pool; Referees: M.J. Segura (ARG)

12 October 1964; 16:30	Official Report p.678	Hungary	5–0	Belgium	Tokyo Metropolitan Indoor Swimming Pool; Referees: T. Batalle (ESP)
12 October 1964; 16:30	Official Report p.678	Score by quarters: 0–0, 2–0, 3–0, 0–0			Tokyo Metropolitan Indoor Swimming Pool; Referees: T. Batalle (ESP)
12 October 1964; 16:30	Official Report p.678	five players 1	Goals	none	Tokyo Metropolitan Indoor Swimming Pool; Referees: T. Batalle (ESP)

13 October 1964; 17:40	Official Report p.681	Egypt	5–8	Belgium	Tokyo Metropolitan Indoor Swimming Pool; Referees: A. Costa (ITA)
13 October 1964; 17:40	Official Report p.681	Score by quarters: 1–2, 3–3, 1–2, 0–1			Tokyo Metropolitan Indoor Swimming Pool; Referees: A. Costa (ITA)
13 October 1964; 17:40	Official Report p.681	Kourched 2	Goals	Dumont 3	Tokyo Metropolitan Indoor Swimming Pool; Referees: A. Costa (ITA)

=== Semifinals ===
==== Semifinal AB ====
Pos	Team	Pld	W	D	L	GF	GA	GD	Pts	Qualification
1	Soviet Union	3	2	1	0	7	4	+3	5	Final
2	Italy	3	2	0	1	6	6	0	4	Final
3	Romania	3	1	1	1	10	10	0	3	Classification 5–8
4	Germany	3	0	0	3	7	10	−3	0	Classification 5–8

Source: Official Report p. 673

11 October 1964; 11:10	Official Report p.675	Italy	4–3	Romania	Tokyo Metropolitan Indoor Swimming Pool; Referees: J. Dirnweber (AUT)
11 October 1964; 11:10	Official Report p.675	Score by quarters: 2–0, 0–2, 2–0, 0–1			Tokyo Metropolitan Indoor Swimming Pool; Referees: J. Dirnweber (AUT)
11 October 1964; 11:10	Official Report p.675	Pizzo 3	Goals	Grinţescu 2	Tokyo Metropolitan Indoor Swimming Pool; Referees: J. Dirnweber (AUT)

12 October 1964; 11:10	Official Report p.677	Soviet Union	3–2	Germany	Tokyo Metropolitan Indoor Swimming Pool; Referees: J. Bauwens (BEL)
12 October 1964; 11:10	Official Report p.677	Score by quarters: 1–2, 0–0, 1–0, 1–0			Tokyo Metropolitan Indoor Swimming Pool; Referees: J. Bauwens (BEL)
12 October 1964; 11:10	Official Report p.677	Bortkevich 2	Goals	Vohs 2	Tokyo Metropolitan Indoor Swimming Pool; Referees: J. Bauwens (BEL)

14 October 1964; 14:16	Official Report p.683	Italy	0–2	Soviet Union	Tokyo Metropolitan Indoor Swimming Pool; Referees: M. Natori (JPN)
14 October 1964; 14:16	Official Report p.683	Score by quarters: 0–1, 0–1, 0–0, 0–0			Tokyo Metropolitan Indoor Swimming Pool; Referees: M. Natori (JPN)
14 October 1964; 14:16	Official Report p.683	none	Goals	Kuznetsov, Semyonov 1	Tokyo Metropolitan Indoor Swimming Pool; Referees: M. Natori (JPN)

14 October 1964; 15:20	Official Report p.683	Romania	5–4	Germany	Tokyo Metropolitan Indoor Swimming Pool; Referees: J. Bauwens (BEL)
14 October 1964; 15:20	Official Report p.683	Score by quarters: 0–0, 1–1, 2–0, 2–3			Tokyo Metropolitan Indoor Swimming Pool; Referees: J. Bauwens (BEL)
14 October 1964; 15:20	Official Report p.683	five players 1	Goals	four players 1	Tokyo Metropolitan Indoor Swimming Pool; Referees: J. Bauwens (BEL)

15 October 1964; 13:00	Official Report p.684	Italy	2–1	Germany	Tokyo Metropolitan Indoor Swimming Pool; Referees: H.G. De Kok (NED)
15 October 1964; 13:00	Official Report p.684	Score by quarters: 0–0, 0–0, 1–0, 1–1			Tokyo Metropolitan Indoor Swimming Pool; Referees: H.G. De Kok (NED)
15 October 1964; 13:00	Official Report p.684	Cevasco, Spinola 1	Goals	Schlenkrich 1	Tokyo Metropolitan Indoor Swimming Pool; Referees: H.G. De Kok (NED)

15 October 1964; 14:10	Official Report p.684	Soviet Union	2–2	Romania	Tokyo Metropolitan Indoor Swimming Pool; Referees: M. Manguillot (ESP)
15 October 1964; 14:10	Official Report p.684	Score by quarters: 0–0, 1–1, 1–0, 0–1			Tokyo Metropolitan Indoor Swimming Pool; Referees: M. Manguillot (ESP)
15 October 1964; 14:10	Official Report p.684	Ageyev, Kalashnikov 1	Goals	Zahan 2	Tokyo Metropolitan Indoor Swimming Pool; Referees: M. Manguillot (ESP)

==== Semifinal CD ====
Pos	Team	Pld	W	D	L	GF	GA	GD	Pts	Qualification
1	Yugoslavia	3	2	1	0	17	8	+9	5	Final
2	Hungary	3	2	1	0	15	9	+6	5	Final
3	Netherlands	3	1	0	2	14	18	−4	2	Classification 5–8
4	Belgium	3	0	0	3	7	18	−11	0	Classification 5–8

Source: Official Report p. 673

12 October 1964; 16:30	Official Report p.678	Hungary	5–0	Belgium	Tokyo Metropolitan Indoor Swimming Pool; Referees: T. Batalle (ESP)
12 October 1964; 16:30	Official Report p.678	Score by quarters: 0–0, 2–0, 3–0, 0–0			Tokyo Metropolitan Indoor Swimming Pool; Referees: T. Batalle (ESP)
12 October 1964; 16:30	Official Report p.678	five players 1	Goals	none	Tokyo Metropolitan Indoor Swimming Pool; Referees: T. Batalle (ESP)

12 October 1964; 17:40	Official Report p.678	Yugoslavia	7–2	Netherlands	Tokyo Metropolitan Indoor Swimming Pool; Referees: A. Costa (ITA)
12 October 1964; 17:40	Official Report p.678	Score by quarters: 1–0, 2–2, 1–0, 3–0			Tokyo Metropolitan Indoor Swimming Pool; Referees: A. Costa (ITA)
12 October 1964; 17:40	Official Report p.678	Nardeli, Rosić 2	Goals	Leenards, Muller 1	Tokyo Metropolitan Indoor Swimming Pool; Referees: A. Costa (ITA)

14 October 1964; 10:00	Official Report p.682	Hungary	6–5	Netherlands	Tokyo Metropolitan Indoor Swimming Pool; Referees: M. Manguillot (ESP)
14 October 1964; 10:00	Official Report p.682	Score by quarters: 3–0, 1–2, 1–1, 1–2			Tokyo Metropolitan Indoor Swimming Pool; Referees: M. Manguillot (ESP)
14 October 1964; 10:00	Official Report p.682	Dömötör 2	Goals	van der Voet 3	Tokyo Metropolitan Indoor Swimming Pool; Referees: M. Manguillot (ESP)

14 October 1964; 13:00	Official Report p.682	Yugoslavia	6–2	Belgium	Tokyo Metropolitan Indoor Swimming Pool; Referees: M.J. Segura (ARG)
14 October 1964; 13:00	Official Report p.682	Score by quarters: 2–0, 2–1, 1–0, 1–1			Tokyo Metropolitan Indoor Swimming Pool; Referees: M.J. Segura (ARG)
14 October 1964; 13:00	Official Report p.682	Stanišić 2	Goals	D'Osterlinck, Dumont 1	Tokyo Metropolitan Indoor Swimming Pool; Referees: M.J. Segura (ARG)

15 October 1964; 15:20	Official Report p.685	Netherlands	7–5	Belgium	Tokyo Metropolitan Indoor Swimming Pool; Referees: W. Fangero (GER)
15 October 1964; 15:20	Official Report p.685	Score by quarters: 3–2, 2–1, 0–1, 2–1			Tokyo Metropolitan Indoor Swimming Pool; Referees: W. Fangero (GER)
15 October 1964; 15:20	Official Report p.685	van der Voet 3	Goals	Pickers 2	Tokyo Metropolitan Indoor Swimming Pool; Referees: W. Fangero (GER)

15 October 1964; 19:20	Official Report p.685	Yugoslavia	4–4	Hungary	Tokyo Metropolitan Indoor Swimming Pool; Referees: J. Dirnweber (AUT)
15 October 1964; 19:20	Official Report p.685	Score by quarters: 3–0, 0–3, 1–0, 0–1			Tokyo Metropolitan Indoor Swimming Pool; Referees: J. Dirnweber (AUT)
15 October 1964; 19:20	Official Report p.685	Sandić 2	Goals	Kárpáti 2	Tokyo Metropolitan Indoor Swimming Pool; Referees: J. Dirnweber (AUT)

=== Final round ===
==== Classification 5–8 ====
Pos	Team	Pld	W	D	L	GF	GA	GD	Pts
5	Romania	3	2	0	1	14	10	+4	4
6	United Team of Germany	3	2	0	1	14	12	+2	4
7	Belgium	3	1	0	2	13	15	−2	2
8	Netherlands	3	1	0	2	12	16	−4	2

Source: Official Report p. 673

14 October 1964; 15:20	Official Report p.683	Romania	5–4	Germany	Tokyo Metropolitan Indoor Swimming Pool; Referees: J. Bauwens (BEL)
14 October 1964; 15:20	Official Report p.683	Score by quarters: 0–0, 1–1, 2–0, 2–3			Tokyo Metropolitan Indoor Swimming Pool; Referees: J. Bauwens (BEL)
14 October 1964; 15:20	Official Report p.683	five players 1	Goals	four players 1	Tokyo Metropolitan Indoor Swimming Pool; Referees: J. Bauwens (BEL)

15 October 1964; 15:20	Official Report p.685	Netherlands	7–5	Belgium	Tokyo Metropolitan Indoor Swimming Pool; Referees: W. Fangero (GER)
15 October 1964; 15:20	Official Report p.685	Score by quarters: 3–2, 2–1, 0–1, 2–1			Tokyo Metropolitan Indoor Swimming Pool; Referees: W. Fangero (GER)
15 October 1964; 15:20	Official Report p.685	van der Voet 3	Goals	Pickers 2	Tokyo Metropolitan Indoor Swimming Pool; Referees: W. Fangero (GER)

17 October 1964; 14:10	Official Report p.686	Romania	6–1	Netherlands	Tokyo Metropolitan Indoor Swimming Pool; Referees: J. Bauwens (BEL)
17 October 1964; 14:10	Official Report p.686	Score by quarters: 2–0, 1–1, 1–0, 2–0			Tokyo Metropolitan Indoor Swimming Pool; Referees: J. Bauwens (BEL)
17 October 1964; 14:10	Official Report p.686	Mărculescu 3	Goals	W. Vriend 1	Tokyo Metropolitan Indoor Swimming Pool; Referees: J. Bauwens (BEL)

17 October 1964; 15:20	Official Report p.687	Germany	5–3	Belgium	Tokyo Metropolitan Indoor Swimming Pool; Referees: J. Brandi (HUN)
17 October 1964; 15:20	Official Report p.687	Score by quarters: 0–1, 1–1, 1–1, 3–0			Tokyo Metropolitan Indoor Swimming Pool; Referees: J. Brandi (HUN)
17 October 1964; 15:20	Official Report p.687	Thiel 3	Goals	De Wilde 2	Tokyo Metropolitan Indoor Swimming Pool; Referees: J. Brandi (HUN)

18 October 1964; 13:50	Official Report p.688	Romania	3–5	Belgium	Tokyo Metropolitan Indoor Swimming Pool; Referees: M.J. Segura (ARG)
18 October 1964; 13:50	Official Report p.688	Score by quarters: 0–1, 1–1, 0–1, 2–2			Tokyo Metropolitan Indoor Swimming Pool; Referees: M.J. Segura (ARG)
18 October 1964; 13:50	Official Report p.688	three players 1	Goals	Dumont 2	Tokyo Metropolitan Indoor Swimming Pool; Referees: M.J. Segura (ARG)

18 October 1964; 14:40	Official Report p.689	Germany	5–4	Netherlands	Tokyo Metropolitan Indoor Swimming Pool; Referees: N. Prostiakov (URS)
18 October 1964; 14:40	Official Report p.689	Score by quarters: 0–1, 2–0, 0–1, 3–2			Tokyo Metropolitan Indoor Swimming Pool; Referees: N. Prostiakov (URS)
18 October 1964; 14:40	Official Report p.689	Vohs 3	Goals	van der Voet 2	Tokyo Metropolitan Indoor Swimming Pool; Referees: N. Prostiakov (URS)

==== Final ====
Pos	Team	Pld	W	D	L	GF	GA	GD	Pts
1	Hungary	3	2	1	0	12	7	+5	5
2	Yugoslavia	3	2	1	0	8	5	+3	5
3	Soviet Union	3	1	0	2	4	7	−3	2
4	Italy	3	0	0	3	2	7	−5	0

Source: Official Report p. 673

14 October 1964; 14:16	Official Report p.683	Italy	0–2	Soviet Union	Tokyo Metropolitan Indoor Swimming Pool; Referees: M. Natori (JPN)
14 October 1964; 14:16	Official Report p.683	Score by quarters: 0–1, 0–1, 0–0, 0–0			Tokyo Metropolitan Indoor Swimming Pool; Referees: M. Natori (JPN)
14 October 1964; 14:16	Official Report p.683	none	Goals	Kuznetsov, Semyonov 1	Tokyo Metropolitan Indoor Swimming Pool; Referees: M. Natori (JPN)

15 October 1964; 19:20	Official Report p.685	Yugoslavia	4–4	Hungary	Tokyo Metropolitan Indoor Swimming Pool; Referees: J. Dirnweber (AUT)
15 October 1964; 19:20	Official Report p.685	Score by quarters: 3–0, 0–3, 1–0, 0–1			Tokyo Metropolitan Indoor Swimming Pool; Referees: J. Dirnweber (AUT)
15 October 1964; 19:20	Official Report p.685	Sandić 2	Goals	Kárpáti 2	Tokyo Metropolitan Indoor Swimming Pool; Referees: J. Dirnweber (AUT)

17 October 1964; 13:00	Official Report p.686	Italy	1–3	Hungary	Tokyo Metropolitan Indoor Swimming Pool; Referees: M. Manguillot (ESP)
17 October 1964; 13:00	Official Report p.686	Score by quarters: 0–0, 1–0, 0–2, 0–1			Tokyo Metropolitan Indoor Swimming Pool; Referees: M. Manguillot (ESP)
17 October 1964; 13:00	Official Report p.686	Cevasco 1	Goals	three players 1	Tokyo Metropolitan Indoor Swimming Pool; Referees: M. Manguillot (ESP)

17 October 1964; 19:30	Official Report p.687	Yugoslavia	2–0	Soviet Union	Tokyo Metropolitan Indoor Swimming Pool; Referees: A. Fuchs (BEL)
17 October 1964; 19:30	Official Report p.687	Score by quarters: 0–0, 0–0, 2–0, 0–0			Tokyo Metropolitan Indoor Swimming Pool; Referees: A. Fuchs (BEL)
17 October 1964; 19:30	Official Report p.687	Janković 2	Goals	none	Tokyo Metropolitan Indoor Swimming Pool; Referees: A. Fuchs (BEL)

18 October 1964; 13:00	Official Report p.688	Italy	1–2	Yugoslavia	Tokyo Metropolitan Indoor Swimming Pool; Referees: J. Dirnweber (AUT)
18 October 1964; 13:00	Official Report p.688	Score by quarters: 0–1, 0–1, 0–0, 1–0			Tokyo Metropolitan Indoor Swimming Pool; Referees: J. Dirnweber (AUT)
18 October 1964; 13:00	Official Report p.688	Spinola 1	Goals	Sandić, Janković 1	Tokyo Metropolitan Indoor Swimming Pool; Referees: J. Dirnweber (AUT)

18 October 1964; 16:00	Official Report p.689	Soviet Union	2–5	Hungary	Tokyo Metropolitan Indoor Swimming Pool; Referees: T. Batalle (ESP)
18 October 1964; 16:00	Official Report p.689	Score by quarters: 0–1, 2–0, 0–1, 0–3			Tokyo Metropolitan Indoor Swimming Pool; Referees: T. Batalle (ESP)
18 October 1964; 16:00	Official Report p.689	Ageyev, Kalashnikov 1	Goals	Dömötör, Felkai 2	Tokyo Metropolitan Indoor Swimming Pool; Referees: T. Batalle (ESP)

== Sources ==
- PDF documents in the LA84 Foundation Digital Library:
  - Official Report of the 1964 Olympic Games, v.2 (download, archive) (pp. 682–698)
- Water polo on the Olympedia website
  - Water polo at the 1964 Summer Olympics (men's tournament)
- Water polo on the Sports Reference website
  - Water polo at the 1964 Summer Games (men's tournament) (archived)
