= Yugoslavia at the 1956 Summer Olympics =

- Flag of FPR Yugoslavia
- IOC code: YUG (JUG used at these Games)
- NOC: Yugoslav Olympic Committee

in Melbourne/Stockholm
- Competitors: 35 (32 men, 3 women) in 8 sports
- Flag bearer: Zdravko Kovačić
- Medals Ranked 26th: Gold 0 Silver 3 Bronze 0 Total 3

Summer Olympics appearances (overview)
- 1920; 1924; 1928; 1932; 1936; 1948; 1952; 1956; 1960; 1964; 1968; 1972; 1976; 1980; 1984; 1988; 1992; 1996; 2000

Other related appearances
- Serbia (1912, 2008–pres.); Croatia (1992–pres.); Slovenia (1992–pres.); Bosnia and Herzegovina (1992 S–pres.); Independent Olympic Participants (1992 S); North Macedonia (1996–pres.); Serbia and Montenegro (1996–2006); Montenegro (2008–pres.); Kosovo (2016–pres.)

Athletes from the Federal People's Republic of Yugoslavia competed at the 1956 Summer Olympics in Melbourne, Australia. As a partial support to the Dutch-led boycott, Yugoslav athletes competed under the Olympic flag instead of the national flag. 35 competitors, 32 men and 3 women, took part in 16 events in 8 sports.

== Medalists ==
Medal	Name	Sport	Event
Silver	Franjo Mihalić	Athletics	Men's Marathon
Silver	Sava Antić; Ibrahim Biogradlić; Mladen Koščak; Dobroslav Krstić; Luka Liposinović; Muhamed Mujić; Zlatko Papec; Petar Radenković; Nikola Radović; Ivan Santek; Dragoslav Šekularac; Ljubiša Spajić; Todor Veselinović; Blagoje Vidinić	Football (Soccer)	Men's Team Competition
Silver	Ivo Cipci; Tomislav Franjković; Vlado Ivković; Zdravko Ježić; Hrvoje Kačić; Zdravko Kovačić; Lovro Radonjić; Marijan Žužej	Water Polo	Men's Team Competition

== Athletics ==
Men's 110m Hurdles

- Stanko Lorger

- Heat — 14.6s
- Semifinals — 14.6s
- Final — 14.5s (→ 5th place)

Men's Marathon

- Franjo Mihalić — 2:26:32 (→ Silver Medal) - Franjo reached the medal podium despite tripping and falling while getting water from a refreshment table at the 15 km mark of the race.

== Cycling ==
Individual road race

- Veselin Petrović — 5:26:58 (→ 26th place)

== Football ==
Men's Team Competition

- First Round:

- Yugoslavia free

- Quarterfinals:

- Yugoslavia – United States 9:1 (5:1)

- Semifinals:

- Yugoslavia – India 4:1 (0:0)

- Final:

- Yugoslavia – USSR 0:1 (0:0)

- Team Roster:

- Petar Radenković
- Mladen Koščak
- Nikola Radović
- Ivan Šantek
- Ljubiša Spajić
- Dobroslav Krstić
- Dragoslav Šekularac
- Zlatko Papec
- Sava Antić
- Todor Veselinović
- Muhamed Mujić
- Blagoje Vidinić
- Ibrahim Biogradlić
- Luka Lipošinović
- Joško Vidošević
- Vladica Popović
- Kruno Radiljević

== Rowing ==
Yugoslavia had one male rowers participate in one out of seven rowing events in 1956.

Men's single sculls

- Perica Vlašić

== Shooting ==
One shooter represented Yugoslavia in 1956.

50 m rifle, three positions

- Zlatko Mašek

50 m rifle, prone

- Zlatko Mašek

== Swimming ==
Women

Athlete	Event	Heat		Final	
Athlete	Event	Time	Rank	Time	Rank
Vinka Jeričević	200 m breaststroke	2:56.0	5 Q	2:55.8	4
