= List of Olympic medalists in water polo (men) =

Men's water polo has been part of the Summer Olympics program since 1900. Hungary men's national water polo team has won sixteen Olympic medals, becoming the most successful country in men's tournament.

There are fifty-nine male athletes who have won three or more Olympic medals in water polo. Dezső Gyarmati of Hungary is the only athlete of either gender to win five Olympic medals in water polo.

== Abbreviations ==
Rk	Rank	Ref	Reference	LH	Left-handed
Pos	Playing position	FP	Field player	GK	Goalkeeper
(C)	Captain	p.	page	pp.	pages

== Medalists by tournament ==
Games	Gold	Silver	Bronze
1900 Paris	Great Britain (Osborne Swimming Club of Manchester); Thomas Coe; Robert Crawshaw; William Henry; John Arthur Jarvis; Peter Kemp; Victor Lindberg (NZL); Frederick Stapleton	Belgium (Brussels Swimming and Water Polo Club); Jean de Backer; Victor de Behr; Henri Cohen; Fernand Feyaerts; Oscar Grégoire; Albert Michant; Georges Romer; Guillaume Séron; Victor Sonnemans; A. R. Upton	France (Libellule de Paris); Bill Burgess (GBR); Jules Clévenot; Alphonse Decuyper; Louis Laufray; Henri Peslier; Auguste Pesloy; Paul Vasseur
1900 Paris	Great Britain (Osborne Swimming Club of Manchester); Thomas Coe; Robert Crawshaw; William Henry; John Arthur Jarvis; Peter Kemp; Victor Lindberg (NZL); Frederick Stapleton	Belgium (Brussels Swimming and Water Polo Club); Jean de Backer; Victor de Behr; Henri Cohen; Fernand Feyaerts; Oscar Grégoire; Albert Michant; Georges Romer; Guillaume Séron; Victor Sonnemans; A. R. Upton	France (Pupilles de Neptune de Lille); Auguste Camelin; Eugène Coulon; Jean Fardelle; Antoine Fiolet; Pierre Gellé; Louis Marc; Louis Martin; Désiré Mérchez
1904 St. Louis	United States; New York Athletic Club; David Bratton; George Van Cleaf; Leo Goodwin; Louis Handley; David Hesser; Joe Ruddy; James Steen	United States; Chicago Athletic Association; Rex Beach; Jerome Steever; Edwin Swatek; Charles Healy; Frank Kehoe; David Hammond; Bill Tuttle	United States; Missouri Athletic Club; John Meyers; Manfred Toeppen; Gwynne Evans; Amedee Reyburn; Frank Schreiner; Augustus Goessling; Bill Orthwein
1908 London (Note: Having drawn a bye in the first round and having received a walkover against Austria in the semi-final, the final was the only match that Great Britain played during the tournament.) (Note: There was no bronze medal match for the 1908 Games in London. Belgium beat the Netherlands in the only one first round match and beat Sweden in the only semifinal.)	Great Britain; George Cornet; Charles Forsyth; George Nevinson; Paul Radmilovic; Charles Smith; Thomas Thould; George Wilkinson	Belgium; Victor Boin; Herman Donners; Fernand Feyaerts; Oscar Grégoire; Herman Meyboom; Albert Michant; Joseph Pletincx	Sweden; Robert Andersson; Erik Bergvall; Pontus Hanson; Harald Julin; Torsten Kumfeldt; Axel Runström; Gunnar Wennerström
1912 Stockholm	Great Britain; Isaac Bentham; Charles Bugbee; George Cornet; Arthur Edwin Hill; Paul Radmilovic; Charles Smith; George Wilkinson	Sweden; Robert Andersson; Vilhelm Andersson; Erik Bergqvist; Max Gumpel; Pontus Hanson; Harald Julin; Torsten Kumfeldt	Belgium; Victor Boin; Félicien Courbet; Herman Donners; Albert Durant; Oscar Grégoire; Herman Meyboom; Joseph Pletincx
1920 Antwerp	Great Britain; Charles Bugbee; William Henry Dean; Christopher Jones; William Peacock; Noel Purcell; Paul Radmilovic; Charles Smith	Belgium; René Bauwens; Gérard Blitz; Maurice Blitz; Pierre Dewin; Albert Durant; Paul Gailly; Pierre Nijs; Joseph Pletincx	Sweden; Erik Andersson; Robert Andersson; Vilhelm Andersson; Nils Backlund; Erik Bergqvist; Max Gumpel; Pontus Hanson; Harald Julin; Torsten Kumfeldt; Theodor Nauman
1924 Paris	France; Albert Deborgies; Noël Delberghe; Robert Desmettre; Paul Dujardin; Albert Mayaud; Henri Padou; Georges Rigal	Belgium; Gérard Blitz; Maurice Blitz; Joseph Cludts; Joseph De Combe; Pierre Dewin; Albert Durant; Georges Fleurix; Paul Gailly; Joseph Pletincx; Jules Thiry; Jean-Pierre Vermetten	United States; Arthur Austin; Charles E. Collett; Jam Handy; Oliver Horn; Fred Lauer; George Mitchell; John Norton; Wally O'Connor; George Schroth; Herb Vollmer; Johnny Weissmuller
1928 Amsterdam	Germany; Max Amann; Karl Bähre; Emil Benecke; Johann Blank; Otto Cordes; Fritz Gunst; Erich Rademacher; Joachim Rademacher	Hungary; István Barta; Olivér Halassy; Márton Homonnai; Sándor Ivády; Alajos Keserű; Ferenc Keserű; József Vértesy	France; Émile Bulteel; Henri Cuvelier; Paul Dujardin; Jules Keignaert; Henri Padou; Ernest Rogez; Albert Thévenon; Achille Tribouillet; Albert Vandeplancke
1932 Los Angeles	Hungary; István Barta; György Bródy; Olivér Halassy; Márton Homonnai; Sándor Ivády; Alajos Keserű; Ferenc Keserű; János Németh; Miklós Sárkány; József Vértesy	Germany; Emil Benecke; Otto Cordes; Hans Eckstein; Fritz Gunst; Erich Rademacher; Joachim Rademacher; Hans Schulze; Heiko Schwartz	United States; Austin Clapp; Philip Daubenspeck; Charles Finn; Charles McCallister; Wally O'Connor; Cal Strong; Herbert Wildman
1936 Berlin	Hungary; Mihály Bozsi; Jenő Brandi; György Bródy; Olivér Halassy; Kálmán Hazai; Márton Homonnai; György Kutasi; István Molnár; János Németh; Miklós Sárkány; Sándor Tarics	Germany; Bernhard Baier; Fritz Gunst; Josef Hauser; Alfred Kienzle; Paul Klingenburg; Heinrich Krug; Hans Schneider; Hans Schulze; Gustav Schürger; Helmuth Schwenn; Fritz Stolze	Belgium; Gérard Blitz; Albert Castelyns; Pierre Coppieters; Joseph De Combe; Henri De Pauw; Henri Disy; Fernand Isselé; Edmond Michiels; Henri Stoelen
1948 London	Italy; Gildo Arena; Emilio Bulgarelli; Pasquale Buonocore; Aldo Ghira; Mario Majoni; Geminio Ognio; Gianfranco Pandolfini; Tullio Pandolfini; Cesare Rubini	Hungary; Jenő Brandi; Oszkár Csuvik; Dezső Fábián; Dezső Gyarmati (LH); Endre Győrfi; Miklós Holop; László Jeney; Dezső Lemhényi; Károly Szittya; István Szívós Sr.	Netherlands; Cor Braasem; Hennie Keetelaar; Nijs Korevaar; Joop Rohner; Frits Ruimschotel; Piet Salomons; Frits Smol; Hans Stam; Ruud van Feggelen
1952 Helsinki	Hungary; Róbert Antal; Antal Bolvári; Dezső Fábián; Dezső Gyarmati (LH); István Hasznos; László Jeney; György Kárpáti; Dezső Lemhényi; Kálmán Markovits; Miklós Martin; Károly Szittya; István Szívós Sr. György Vizvári	Yugoslavia; Veljko Bakašun; Marko Brainović; Vladimir Ivković; Zdravko Ježić; Zdravko-Ćiro Kovačić; Ivo Kurtini; Lovro Radonjić; Ivo Štakula; Boško Vuksanović	Italy; Gildo Arena; Lucio Ceccarini; Renato De Sanzuane; Raffaello Gambino; Salvatore Gionta; Maurizio Mannelli; Geminio Ognio; Carlo Peretti; Enzo Polito; Cesare Rubini; Renato Traiola
1956 Melbourne	Hungary; Antal Bolvári; Ottó Boros; Dezső Gyarmati (LH); István Hevesi; László Jeney; Tivadar Kanizsa; György Kárpáti; Kálmán Markovits; Mihály Mayer; István Szívós Sr. Ervin Zádor	Yugoslavia; Ivo Cipci; Tomislav Franjković; Vladimir Ivković; Zdravko Ježić; Hrvoje Kačić; Zdravko-Ćiro Kovačić; Lovro Radonjić; Marijan Žužej	Soviet Union; Viktor Ageyev; Pyotr Breus; Boris Goykhman; Nodar Gvakhariya; Vyacheslav Kurennoy; Boris Markarov; Petre Mshvenieradze; Valentin Prokopov; Mikhail Ryzhak; Yury Shlyapin
1960 Rome	Italy; Amedeo Ambron; Danio Bardi; Giuseppe D'Altrui; Salvatore Gionta; Giancarlo Guerrini; Franco Lavoratori; Gianni Lonzi; Luigi Mannelli; Rosario Parmegiani; Eraldo Pizzo; Dante Rossi; Brunello Spinelli	Soviet Union; Viktor Ageyev; Givi Chikvanaia; Leri Gogoladze; Boris Goykhman; Yury Grigorovsky; Anatoly Kartashov; Vyacheslav Kurennoy; Petre Mshvenieradze; Vladimir Novikov; Yevgeny Saltsyn; Vladimir Semyonov	Hungary; András Bodnár; Ottó Boros; Zoltán Dömötör; László Felkai; Dezső Gyarmati (LH); István Hevesi; László Jeney; Tivadar Kanizsa; György Kárpáti; András Katona; János Konrád; Kálmán Markovits; Mihály Mayer; Péter Rusorán
1964 Tokyo	Hungary; Miklós Ambrus; András Bodnár; Ottó Boros; Zoltán Dömötör; László Felkai; Dezső Gyarmati (LH); Tivadar Kanizsa; György Kárpáti; János Konrád; Mihály Mayer; Dénes Pócsik; Péter Rusorán	Yugoslavia; Ozren Bonačić; Zoran Janković; Milan Muškatirović; Ante Nardelli; Frane Nonković; Vinko Rosić; Mirko Sandić; Zlatko Šimenc; Božidar Stanišić; Karlo Stipanić; Ivo Trumbić	Soviet Union; Viktor Ageyev; Zenon Bortkevich; Eduard Egorov; Igor Grabovsky; Boris Grishin; Nikolay Kalashnikov; Nikolay Kuznetsov; Vladimir Kuznetsov; Leonid Osipov; Boris Popov; Vladimir Semyonov
1968 Mexico City	Yugoslavia; Ozren Bonačić; Dejan Dabović; Zdravko Hebel; Zoran Janković; Ronald Lopatni; Uroš Marović; Đorđe Perišić; Miroslav Poljak; Mirko Sandić; Karlo Stipanić; Ivo Trumbić	Soviet Union; Aleksei Barkalov; Oleg Bovin; Givi Chikvanaia; Aleksandr Dolgushin; Yury Grigorovsky; Boris Grishin; Vadim Gulyayev; Leonid Osipov; Vladimir Semyonov; Aleksandr Shidlovsky; Viacheslav Skok	Hungary; András Bodnár; Zoltán Dömötör; László Felkai; Ferenc Konrád; János Konrád; Mihály Mayer; Endre Molnár; Dénes Pócsik; László Sárosi; János Steinmetz; István Szívós Jr.
1972 Munich	Soviet Union; Anatoly Akimov; Aleksei Barkalov; Aleksandr Dolgushin; Aleksandr Dreval; Vadim Gulyayev; Aleksandr Kabanov; Nikolay Melnikov; Leonid Osipov; Aleksandr Shidlovsky; Viacheslav Sobchenko; Vladimir Zhmudsky	Hungary; András Bodnár; Tibor Cservenyák; Tamás Faragó; István Görgényi; Zoltán Kásás; Ferenc Konrád; István Magas; Endre Molnár; Dénes Pócsik; László Sárosi; István Szívós Jr.	United States; Peter Asch; Steven Barnett; Bruce Bradley; Stanley Cole; James Ferguson; Eric Lindroth; John Parker; Gary Sheerer; James Slatton; Russell Webb; Barry Weitzenberg
1976 Montreal	Hungary; Gábor Csapó; Tibor Cservenyák; Tamás Faragó; György Gerendás; György Horkai; György Kenéz; Ferenc Konrád; Endre Molnár; László Sárosi; Attila Sudár; István Szívós Jr.	Italy; Alberto Alberani; Silvio Baracchini; Luigi Castagnola; Vincenzo D'Angelo; Gianni De Magistris; Riccardo De Magistris; Marcello Del Duca; Alessandro Ghibellini; Sante Marsili; Umberto Panerai; Roldano Simeoni	Netherlands; Alex Boegschoten; Ton Buunk; Piet de Zwarte; Andy Hoepelman; Evert Kroon; Nico Landeweerd; Hans Smits; Gijze Stroboer; Rik Toonen; Hans van Zeeland; Jan Evert Veer
1980 Moscow	Soviet Union; Vladimir Akimov; Aleksei Barkalov; Yevgeny Grishin; Mikhail Ivanov; Aleksandr Kabanov; Sergey Kotenko; Giorgi Mshvenieradze; Mait Riisman; Erkin Shagaev; Yevgeny Sharonov; Viacheslav Sobchenko	Yugoslavia; Milivoj Bebić; Zoran Gopčević; Milorad Krivokapić; Boško Lozica; Predrag Manojlović; Zoran Mustur; Damir Polić; Zoran Roje; Ratko Rudić; Slobodan Trifunović; Luka Vezilić	Hungary; Gábor Csapó; Tamás Faragó; György Gerendás; Károly Hauszler; György Horkai; István Kiss; László Kuncz; Endre Molnár; Attila Sudár; István Szívós Jr. István Udvardi
1984 Los Angeles	Yugoslavia; Dragan Andrić; Milivoj Bebić; Perica Bukić; Veselin Đuho; Milorad Krivokapić; Deni Lušić; Igor Milanović; Tomislav Paškvalin (LH); Zoran Petrović; Andrija Popović; Zoran Roje; Goran Sukno; Božo Vuletić	United States; Doug Burke; Peter Campbell; Jody Campbell; Christopher Dorst; Gary Figueroa; Andrew McDonald; Kevin Robertson; Terence Schroeder; Timothy Shaw; John Siman; Jon Svendsen; Joseph Vargas; Craig Wilson	West Germany; Armando Fernández; Roland Freund; Rainer Hoppe; Thomas Huber; Thomas Loebb; Werner Obschernikat; Rainer Osselmann; Frank Otto; Peter Röhle; Jürgen Schröder; Hagen Stamm; Dirk Theismann
1988 Seoul	Yugoslavia; Dragan Andrić; Mislav Bezmalinović; Perica Bukić; Veselin Đuho; Igor Gočanin; Deni Lušić; Igor Milanović; Tomislav Paškvalin (LH); Renco Posinković; Goran Rađenović; Dubravko Šimenc; Aleksandar Šoštar; Mirko Vičević	United States; James Bergeson; Greg Boyer; Peter Campbell; Jeff Campbell; Jody Campbell; Christopher Duplanty; Michael Evans; Douglas Kimbell; Craig Klass; Alan Mouchawar; Kevin Robertson; Terence Schroeder; Craig Wilson	Soviet Union; Dmitry Apanasenko; Viktor Berendyuha; Mikheil Giorgadze; Yevgeny Grishin; Mikhail Ivanov; Aleksandr Kolotov; Sergey Kotenko; Serghei Marcoci; Nurlan Mendygaliyev; Giorgi Mshvenieradze; Sergey Naumov; Yevgeny Sharonov; Nikolai Smirnov
1992 Barcelona	Italy; Francesco Attolico; Gianni Averaimo; Alessandro Bovo; Paolo Caldarella; Alessandro Campagna; Marco D'Altrui; Massimiliano Ferretti; Mario Fiorillo; Ferdinando Gandolfi; Amedeo Pomilio (LH); Francesco Porzio (LH); Giuseppe Porzio; Carlo Silipo	Spain; Daniel Ballart; Manuel Estiarte; Pedro García Aguado; Salvador Gómez; Marco Antonio González; Rubén Michavila; Miki Oca; Sergi Pedrerol (LH); Josep Picó; Jesús Rollán; Ricardo Sánchez; Jordi Sans; Manuel Silvestre	Unified Team; Dmitry Apanasenko; Andrey Belofastov; Yevgeny Sharonov; Dmitry Gorshkov; Vladimir Karabutov; Aleksandr Kolotov; Andrei Kovalenko; Nikolay Kozlov; Serghei Marcoci; Sergey Naumov; Aleksandr Ogorodnikov; Aleksandr Chigir; Aleksey Vdovin
1996 Atlanta	Spain; Josep María Abarca; Ángel Andreo; Daniel Ballart; Manuel Estiarte; Pedro García Aguado; Salvador Gómez; Iván Moro; Miki Oca; Jorge Payá; Sergi Pedrerol (LH); Jesús Rollán; Jordi Sans; Carles Sans	Croatia; Maro Balić; Perica Bukić; Damir Glavan; Igor Hinić; Vjekoslav Kobešćak; Joško Kreković; Ognjen Kržić; Dubravko Šimenc; Siniša Školneković; Ratko Štritof; Tino Vegar; Renato Vrbičić; Zdeslav Vrdoljak	Italy; Alberto Angelini; Francesco Attolico; Fabio Bencivenga; Alessandro Bovo; Alessandro Calcaterra; Roberto Calcaterra; Marco Gerini; Alberto Ghibellini; Luca Giustolisi; Amedeo Pomilio (LH); Francesco Postiglione; Carlo Silipo; Leonardo Sottani
2000 Sydney	Hungary; Tibor Benedek (LH); Péter Biros; Rajmund Fodor; Tamás Kásás; Gergely Kiss (LH); Zoltán Kósz; Tamás Märcz; Tamás Molnár; Barnabás Steinmetz; Zoltán Szécsi; Bulcsú Székely; Zsolt Varga; Attila Vári	Russia; Roman Balashov; Dmitri Dugin; Sergey Garbuzov; Dmitry Gorshkov; Yuri Yatsev; Nikolay Kozlov; Nikolay Maksimov; Andrei Rekechinski; Dmitri Stratan; Revaz Chomakhidze; Aleksandr Yeryshov; Marat Zakirov; Irek Zinnurov	FR Yugoslavia (Note: After the breakup of Yugoslavia, FR Yugoslavia men's national water polo team participated at the 1996 and 2000 Olympics, and won a bronze medal in 2000. In 2003, after the country was renamed from FR Yugoslavia to Serbia and Montenegro, the team was also renamed to "Serbia and Montenegro men's national water polo team".); Aleksandar Ćirić; Danilo Ikodinović; Viktor Jelenić; Nikola Kuljača; Aleksandar Šapić; Dejan Savić; Aleksandar Šoštar; Petar Trbojević; Veljko Uskoković; Jugoslav Vasović; Vladimir Vujasinović; Nenad Vukanić; Predrag Zimonjić
2004 Athens	Hungary; Tibor Benedek (LH); Péter Biros; Rajmund Fodor; István Gergely; Tamás Kásás; Gergely Kiss (LH); Norbert Madaras (LH); Tamás Molnár; Ádám Steinmetz; Barnabás Steinmetz; Zoltán Szécsi; Tamás Varga; Attila Vári	Serbia and Montenegro; Aleksandar Ćirić; Vladimir Gojković; Danilo Ikodinović; Viktor Jelenić; Predrag Jokić; Nikola Kuljača; Slobodan Nikić; Aleksandar Šapić; Dejan Savić; Denis Šefik; Petar Trbojević; Vanja Udovičić; Vladimir Vujasinović	Russia; Roman Balashov; Revaz Chomakhidze; Aleksandr Fyodorov; Sergey Garbuzov; Dmitry Gorshkov; Nikolay Kozlov; Nikolay Maksimov; Andrei Rekechinski; Dmitri Stratan; Aleksandr Yeryshov; Vitaly Yurchik; Marat Zakirov; Irek Zinnurov
2008 Beijing	Hungary; Zoltán Szécsi; Tamás Varga; Norbert Madaras (LH); Dénes Varga; Tamás Kásás; Norbert Hosnyánszky; Gergely Kiss (LH); Tibor Benedek (LH); Dániel Varga; Péter Biros; Gábor Kis; Tamás Molnár; István Gergely	United States; Merrill Moses; Peter Varellas; Peter Hudnut; Jeff Powers; Adam Wright; Rick Merlo; Layne Beaubien; Tony Azevedo; Ryan Bailey; Tim Hutten; Jesse Smith; J. W. Krumpholz; Brandon Brooks	Serbia; Denis Šefik; Živko Gocić; Andrija Prlainović; Vanja Udovičić; Dejan Savić; Duško Pijetlović; Nikola Rađen; Filip Filipović (LH); Aleksandar Ćirić; Aleksandar Šapić; Vladimir Vujasinović; Branko Peković; Slobodan Soro
2012 London	Croatia; Josip Pavić (GK); Damir Burić; Miho Bošković; Nikša Dobud; Maro Joković (LH); Ivan Buljubašić; Petar Muslim; Andro Bušlje; Sandro Sukno; Samir Barać (C); Igor Hinić; Paulo Obradović; Frano Vićan (GK)	Italy; Stefano Tempesti (C, GK); Amaurys Pérez; Niccolò Gitto; Pietro Figlioli; Alex Giorgetti; Maurizio Felugo; Massimo Giacoppo; Valentino Gallo (LH); Christian Presciutti; Deni Fiorentini; Matteo Aicardi; Danijel Premuš; Giacomo Pastorino (GK)	Serbia; Slobodan Soro (GK); Aleksa Šaponjić; Živko Gocić; Vanja Udovičić (C); Dušan Mandić (LH); Duško Pijetlović; Slobodan Nikić; Milan Aleksić; Nikola Rađen; Filip Filipović (LH); Andrija Prlainović; Stefan Mitrović; Gojko Pijetlović (GK)
2016 Rio de Janeiro	Serbia; Gojko Pijetlović (GK); Dušan Mandić (LH); Živko Gocić (C); Sava Ranđelović; Miloš Ćuk; Duško Pijetlović; Slobodan Nikić; Milan Aleksić; Nikola Jakšić; Filip Filipović (LH); Andrija Prlainović; Stefan Mitrović; Branislav Mitrović (GK)	Croatia; Josip Pavić (C, GK); Damir Burić; Antonio Petković; Luka Lončar; Maro Joković (LH); Luka Bukić; Marko Macan; Andro Bušlje; Sandro Sukno; Ivan Krapić; Anđelo Šetka; Xavier García (LH); Marko Bijač (GK)	Italy; Stefano Tempesti (C, GK); Francesco Di Fulvio; Niccolò Gitto; Pietro Figlioli; Andrea Fondelli; Alessandro Velotto; Alessandro Nora (LH); Valentino Gallo (LH); Christian Presciutti; Michaël Bodegas; Matteo Aicardi; Nicholas Presciutti; Marco Del Lungo (GK)
2020 Tokyo	Serbia; Gojko Pijetlović (GK); Dušan Mandić (LH); Nikola Dedović; Sava Ranđelović; Strahinja Rašović; Duško Pijetlović; Đorđe Lazić; Milan Aleksić; Nikola Jakšić; Filip Filipović (C, LH); Andrija Prlainović; Stefan Mitrović; Branislav Mitrović (GK)	Greece; Emmanouil Zerdevas (GK); Konstantinos Genidounias; Dimitrios Skoumpakis; Marios Kapotsis; Ioannis Fountoulis (C); Alexandros Papanastasiou; Georgios Dervisis; Stylianos Argyropoulos; Konstantinos Mourikis; Christodoulos Kolomvos; Konstantinos Gkiouvetsis; Angelos Vlachopoulos; Konstantinos Galanidis (GK)	Hungary; Viktor Nagy (GK); Dániel Angyal; Krisztián Manhercz; Gergő Zalánki (LH); Márton Vámos (LH); Norbert Hosnyánszky; Mátyás Pásztor; Szilárd Jansik; Balázs Erdélyi; Dénes Varga (C); Tamás Mezei (LH); Balázs Hárai; Soma Vogel (GK)
2024 Paris	Serbia; Radoslav Filipović (GK); Dušan Mandić; Strahinja Rašović; Sava Ranđelović; Miloš Ćuk; Nikola Dedović; Radomir Drašović; Nikola Jakšić (C); Nemanja Ubović; Nemanja Vico; Petar Jakšić; Viktor Rašović; Vladimir Mišović(GK)	Croatia; Marko Bijač (GK, C); Rino Burić; Loren Fatović; Luka Lončar; Maro Joković; Luka Bukić; Ante Vukičević; Marko Žuvela; Jerko Marinić Kragić; Josip Vrlić; Matias Biljaka; Konstantin Kharkov; Toni Popadić (GK)	United States; Alex Bowen; Luca Cupido; Hannes Daube; Chase Dodd; Ryder Dodd; Ben Hallock (C); Drew Holland (GK); Johnny Hooper; Max Irving; Alex Obert; Marko Vavic; Adrian Weinberg (GK); Dylan Woodhead
2028 Los Angeles			

== Overall multiple medalists ==
As of the 2024 Summer Olympics, 61 male athletes have won three or more Olympic medals in water polo.

=== By tournament ===
The following table is pre-sorted by edition of the Olympics (in ascending order), name of the team (in ascending order), name of the player (in ascending order), respectively. Last updated: 11 August 2021.

Legend

- Team^{*} – Host team

Year	Total	Five-time Olympic medalist		Four-time Olympic medalist		Three-time Olympic medalist	
1900	0	—	0	—	0	—	0
1904	0	—	0	—	0	—	0
1908	0	—	0	—	0	—	0
1912	1	—	0	—	0	Belgium: Oscar Grégoire	1
1920	7	—	0	—	0	Belgium^{*}: Joseph Pletincx; Great Britain: Paul Radmilovic, Charles Sydney Smith (GK); Sweden: Robert Andersson, Pontus Hanson, Harald Julin, Torsten Kumfeldt	7
1924	2	—	0	Belgium: Joseph Pletincx	1	Belgium: Albert Durant	1
1928	0	—	0	—	0	—	0
1932	0	—	0	—	0	—	0
1936	4	—	0	—	0	Belgium: Gérard Blitz; Germany^{*}: Fritz Gunst; Hungary: Olivér Halassy, Márton Homonnai	4
1948	0	—	0	—	0	—	0
1952	0	—	0	—	0	—	0
1956	3	—	0	—	0	Hungary: Dezső Gyarmati, László Jeney (GK), István Szívós Sr.	3
1960	4	—	0	Hungary: Dezső Gyarmati, László Jeney (GK)	2	Hungary: György Kárpáti, Kálmán Markovits	2
1964	6	Hungary: Dezső Gyarmati	1	Hungary: György Kárpáti	1	Hungary: Ottó Boros (GK), Tivadar Kanizsa, Mihály Mayer; Soviet Union: Viktor Ageyev	4
Year	Total	Five-time Olympic medalist		Four-time Olympic medalist		Three-time Olympic medalist	
1968	6	—	0	Hungary: Mihály Mayer	1	Hungary: András Bodnár, Zoltán Dömötör, László Felkai, János Konrád; Soviet Union: Vladimir Semyonov	5
1972	3	—	0	Hungary: András Bodnár	1	Hungary: Dénes Pócsik; Soviet Union: Leonid Osipov	2
1976	4	—	0	—	0	Hungary: Ferenc Konrád, Endre Molnár (GK), László Sárosi, István Szívós Jr.	4
1980	5	—	0	Hungary: Endre Molnár (GK), István Szívós Jr.	2	Hungary: Tamás Faragó; Soviet Union^{*}: Aleksei Barkalov, Yevgeny Sharonov	3
1984	0	—	0	—	0	—	0
1988	0	—	0	—	0	—	0
1992	1	—	0	—	0	(International Olympic Committee) Unified Team: Yevgeny Sharonov (GK)	1
1996	1	—	0	—	0	Croatia: Perica Bukić	1
2000	0	—	0	—	0	—	0
2004	2	—	0	—	0	Russia: Dmitry Gorshkov, Nikolay Kozlov	2
2008	10	—	0	—	0	Hungary: Tibor Benedek, Péter Biros, Tamás Kásás, Gergely Kiss, Tamás Molnár, Zoltán Szécsi (GK); Serbia: Aleksandar Ćirić, Aleksandar Šapić, Dejan Savić, Vladimir Vujasinović	10
2012	1	—	0	—	0	Serbia: Vanja Udovičić	1
2016	4	—	0	—	0	Serbia: Filip Filipović, Živko Gocić, Duško Pijetlović, Andrija Prlainović	4
2020	7	—	0	Serbia: Filip Filipović, Duško Pijetlović, Andrija Prlainović	3	Serbia: Milan Aleksić, Dušan Mandić, Stefan Mitrović, Gojko Pijetlović (GK)	4
2024	3	—	0	Serbia: Dušan Mandić	1	Serbia: Sava Ranđelović, Nikola Jakšić	2
Year	Total	Five-time Olympic medalist		Four-time Olympic medalist		Three-time Olympic medalist	

Sources:

- Sports Reference: Athlete Medal Leaders (1900–2016);
- Official Results Books (PDF): 2000 (p. 27), 2004 (p. 89), 2008 (p. 79), 2012 (p. 370), 2016 (p. 6), 2020 (p. 11).

=== By confederation ===
Last updated: 11 August 2021.

Confederation	Number of multi-time Olympic medalists			
Confederation	Five-time	Four-time	Three-time	Total
Africa – CANA	0	0	0	0
Americas – UANA	0	0	0	0
Asia – AASF	0	0	0	0
Europe – LEN	1	10	48	59
Oceania – OSA	0	0	0	0
Total	1	10	48	59

=== By team ===
Last updated: 11 August 2021.

Legend

- Team^{†} – Defunct team

Men's team	Number of multi-time Olympians				Confederation
Men's team	Five-time	Four-time	Three-time	Total	Confederation
Belgium	0	1	3	4	Europe – LEN
Croatia	0	0	1	1	Europe – LEN
Germany	0	0	1	1	Europe – LEN
Great Britain	0	0	2	2	Europe – LEN
Hungary	1	6	19	26	Europe – LEN
Russia	0	0	2	2	Europe – LEN
Serbia	0	3	11	14	Europe – LEN
Soviet Union^{†}	0	0	4	4	Europe – LEN
Sweden	0	0	4	4	Europe – LEN
(International Olympic Committee) Unified Team^{†} (Note: In 1992, 12 of the 15 former Soviet Republics competed together as the Unified Team and marched under the Olympic Flag in the Barcelona Games.)	0	0	1	1	Europe – LEN
Total	1	10	48	59	

=== By position ===
Last updated: 11 August 2021.

Position	Number of multi-time Olympians			
Position	Five-time	Four-time	Three-time	Total
Field player	1	8	41	50
Goalkeeper	0	2	7	9
Total	1	10	48	59

=== Four or more Olympic medals ===
The following table is pre-sorted by total number of Olympic medals (in descending order), number of Olympic gold medals (in descending order), number of Olympic silver medals (in descending order), year of receiving the last Olympic medal (in ascending order), year of receiving the first Olympic medal (in ascending order), name of the player (in ascending order), respectively. Last updated: 11 August 2024.

Eleven male athletes won four or more Olympic medals in water polo. Among them, seven were members of the Hungary men's national water polo team. Dezső Gyarmati is the first and only athlete (man or woman) to win five Olympic medals in water polo (three gold, one silver and one bronze).

Filip Filipović, Duško Pijetlović and Andrija Prlainović, all representing Serbia, won four consecutive Olympic medals between 2008 and 2021.

Legend

- – Hosts

Male athletes who won four or more Olympic medals in water polo
Rk	Player	Birth	Height	Men's team	Pos	Water polo tournaments					Period (age of first/last)	Medals				Ref
Rk	Player	Birth	Height	Men's team	Pos	1	2	3	4	5	Period (age of first/last)	G	S	B	T	Ref
1	Dezső Gyarmati	1927	1.86 m (6 ft 1 in)	Hungary	FP	1948	1952	1956	1960	1964	16 years (20/36)	3	1	1	5	
2	György Kárpáti	1935	1.67 m (5 ft 6 in)	Hungary	FP	1952	1956	1960	1964		12 years (17/29)	3	0	1	4	
2	Dušan Mandić	1994	2.02 m (6 ft 8 in)	Serbia	FP	2012	2016	2020	2024		12 years (18/30)	3	0	1	4	
4	László Jeney	1923	1.81 m (5 ft 11 in)	Hungary	GK	1948	1952	1956	1960		12 years (25/37)	2	1	1	4	
5	Mihály Mayer	1933	1.85 m (6 ft 1 in)	Hungary	FP	1956	1960	1964	1968		12 years (22/34)	2	0	2	4	
5	Filip Filipović	1987	1.96 m (6 ft 5 in)	Serbia	FP	2008	2012	2016	2020		13 years (21/34)	2	0	2	4	
5	Duško Pijetlović	1985	1.97 m (6 ft 6 in)	Serbia	FP	2008	2012	2016	2020		13 years (23/36)	2	0	2	4	
5	Andrija Prlainović	1987	1.87 m (6 ft 2 in)	Serbia	FP	2008	2012	2016	2020		13 years (21/34)	2	0	2	4	
9	András Bodnár	1942	1.80 m (5 ft 11 in)	Hungary	FP	1960	1964	1968	1972		12 years (18/30)	1	1	2	4	
9	Endre Molnár	1945	1.85 m (6 ft 1 in)	Hungary	GK	1968	1972	1976	1980		12 years (23/35)	1	1	2	4	
9	István Szívós Jr.	1948	2.02 m (6 ft 8 in)	Hungary	FP	1968	1972	1976	1980		12 years (20/32)	1	1	2	4	
12	Joseph Pletincx	1888		Belgium	FP	1908	1912	1920	1924		16 years (20/36)	0	3	1	4	
Rk	Player	Birth	Height	Men's team	Pos	1	2	3	4	5	Period (age of first/last)	G	S	B	T	Ref
Rk	Player	Birth	Height	Men's team	Pos	Water polo tournaments					Period (age of first/last)	Medals				Ref

Sources:

- Sports Reference: Athlete Medal Leaders (1900–2016);
- Official Results Books (PDF): 2000 (p. 27), 2004 (p. 89), 2008 (p. 79), 2012 (p. 370), 2016 (p. 6), 2020 (p. 11).

=== Three Olympic medals ===
The following table is pre-sorted by number of Olympic gold medals (in descending order), number of Olympic silver medals (in descending order), year of receiving the last Olympic medal (in ascending order), year of receiving the first Olympic medal (in ascending order), name of the player (in ascending order), respectively. Last updated: 11 August 2024.

Forty-eight male athletes won three Olympic medals in water polo.

Legend

- – Hosts

Male athletes who won three Olympic medals in water polo
Rk	Player	Birth	Height	Men's team	Pos	Water polo tournaments					Period (age of first/last)	Medals				Ref
Rk	Player	Birth	Height	Men's team	Pos	1	2	3	4	5	Period (age of first/last)	G	S	B	T	Ref
13	Paul Radmilovic	1886	1.80 m (5 ft 11 in)	Great Britain	FP	1908	1912	1920	1924	1928	20 years (22/42)	3	0	0	3	
13	Charles Smith	1879	1.86 m (6 ft 1 in)	Great Britain	GK	1908	1912	1920	1924		16 years (29/45)	3	0	0	3	
13	Tibor Benedek	1972	1.90 m (6 ft 3 in)	Hungary	FP	1992	1996	2000	2004	2008	16 years (20/36)	3	0	0	3	
13	Péter Biros	1976	1.96 m (6 ft 5 in)	Hungary	FP	2000	2004	2008	2012		12 years (24/36)	3	0	0	3	
13	Tamás Kásás	1976	2.00 m (6 ft 7 in)	Hungary	FP	1996	2000	2004	2008	2012	16 years (20/36)	3	0	0	3	
13	Gergely Kiss	1977	1.98 m (6 ft 6 in)	Hungary	FP	2000	2004	2008	2012		12 years (22/34)	3	0	0	3	
13	Tamás Molnár	1975	1.93 m (6 ft 4 in)	Hungary	FP	2000	2004	2008			8 years (25/33)	3	0	0	3	
13	Zoltán Szécsi	1977	1.98 m (6 ft 6 in)	Hungary	GK	2000	2004	2008	2012		12 years (22/34)	3	0	0	3	
13	Nikola Jakšić	1997	1.96 m (6 ft 5 in)	Serbia	FP	2016	2020	2024			8 years (19/27)	3	0	0	3	
13	Sava Ranđelović	1993	1.93 m (6 ft 4 in)	Serbia	FP	2016	2020	2024			8 years (23/31)	3	0	0	3	
23	Olivér Halassy	1909	1.55 m (5 ft 1 in)	Hungary	FP	1928	1932	1936			8 years (18/27)	2	1	0	3	
23	Márton Homonnai	1906	1.85 m (6 ft 1 in)	Hungary	FP	1924	1928	1932	1936		12 years (18/30)	2	1	0	3	
23	István Szívós Sr.	1920	1.85 m (6 ft 1 in)	Hungary	FP	1948	1952	1956			8 years (27/36)	2	1	0	3	
23	Aleksei Barkalov	1946	1.80 m (5 ft 11 in)	Soviet Union	FP	1968	1972	1976	1980		12 years (22/34)	2	1	0	3	
23	Perica Bukić	1966	1.98 m (6 ft 6 in)	Yugoslavia	FP	1984	1988				12 years (18/30)	2	1	0	3	
23	Perica Bukić	1966	1.98 m (6 ft 6 in)	Croatia	FP				1996		12 years (18/30)	2	1	0	3	
29	Kálmán Markovits	1931	1.78 m (5 ft 10 in)	Hungary	FP	1952	1956	1960			8 years (20/28)	2	0	1	3	
29	Ottó Boros	1929	1.86 m (6 ft 1 in)	Hungary	GK	1956	1960	1964			8 years (27/35)	2	0	1	3	
29	Tivadar Kanizsa	1933	1.80 m (5 ft 11 in)	Hungary	FP	1956	1960	1964			8 years (23/31)	2	0	1	3	
29	Milan Aleksić	1986	1.93 m (6 ft 4 in)	Serbia	FP	2012	2016	2020			9 years (26/35)	2	0	1	3	
29	Stefan Mitrović	1988	1.95 m (6 ft 5 in)	Serbia	FP	2012	2016	2020			9 years (24/33)	2	0	1	3	
29	Gojko Pijetlović	1983	1.94 m (6 ft 4 in)	Serbia	GK	2012	2016	2020			9 years (29/38)	2	0	1	3	
35	Fritz Gunst	1908		Germany	FP	1928	1932	1936			8 years (19/27)	1	2	0	3	
36	Leonid Osipov	1943	1.87 m (6 ft 2 in)	Soviet Union	FP	1964	1968	1972			8 years (21/29)	1	1	1	3	
36	Dénes Pócsik	1940	1.95 m (6 ft 5 in)	Hungary	FP	1964	1968	1972			8 years (24/32)	1	1	1	3	
36	Ferenc Konrád	1945	1.83 m (6 ft 0 in)	Hungary	FP	1968	1972	1976			8 years (23/31)	1	1	1	3	
36	László Sárosi	1946	1.83 m (6 ft 0 in)	Hungary	FP	1968	1972	1976			8 years (22/29)	1	1	1	3	
36	Tamás Faragó	1952	1.94 m (6 ft 4 in)	Hungary	FP	1972	1976	1980			8 years (20/27)	1	1	1	3	
36	Slobodan Nikić	1983	1.97 m (6 ft 6 in)	Serbia and Montenegro	FP	2004					12 years (21/33)	1	1	1	3	
36	Slobodan Nikić	1983	1.97 m (6 ft 6 in)	Serbia	FP			2012	2016		12 years (21/33)	1	1	1	3	
43	Zoltán Dömötör	1935	1.86 m (6 ft 1 in)	Hungary	FP	1960	1964	1968			8 years (25/33)	1	0	2	3	
43	László Felkai	1941	1.80 m (5 ft 11 in)	Hungary	FP	1960	1964	1968			8 years (19/27)	1	0	2	3	
43	János Konrád	1941	1.83 m (6 ft 0 in)	Hungary	FP	1960	1964	1968			8 years (18/27)	1	0	2	3	
43	Yevgeny Sharonov	1958	1.89 m (6 ft 2 in)	Soviet Union	GK	1980		1988			12 years (21/33)	1	0	2	3	
43	Yevgeny Sharonov	1958	1.89 m (6 ft 2 in)	(International Olympic Committee) Unified Team	GK				1992		12 years (21/33)	1	0	2	3	
43	Živko Gocić	1982	1.93 m (6 ft 4 in)	Serbia	FP	2008	2012	2016			8 years (25/33)	1	0	2	3	
47	Oscar Grégoire	1877		Belgium	FP	1900	1908	1912			12 years (23/35)	0	2	1	3	
47	Albert Durant	1892		Belgium	GK	1912	1920	1924			12 years (20/32)	0	2	1	3	
47	Gérard Blitz	1901		Belgium	FP	1920	1924	1928		1936	16 years (19/35)	0	2	1	3	
47	Vladimir Semyonov	1938	1.84 m (6 ft 0 in)	Soviet Union	FP	1960	1964	1968			8 years (22/30)	0	2	1	3	
51	Robert Andersson	1886		Sweden	FP	1908	1912	1920			12 years (21/33)	0	1	2	3	
51	Pontus Hanson	1884		Sweden	FP	1908	1912	1920			12 years (24/36)	0	1	2	3	
51	Harald Julin	1890		Sweden	FP	1908	1912	1920			12 years (18/30)	0	1	2	3	
51	Torsten Kumfeldt	1886		Sweden	GK	1908	1912	1920			12 years (22/34)	0	1	2	3	
51	Viktor Ageyev	1936	1.84 m (6 ft 0 in)	Soviet Union	FP	1956	1960	1964			8 years (20/28)	0	1	2	3	
51	Dmitry Gorshkov	1967	1.80 m (5 ft 11 in)	(International Olympic Committee) Unified Team	FP	1992					12 years (25/37)	0	1	2	3	
51	Dmitry Gorshkov	1967	1.80 m (5 ft 11 in)	Russia	FP		1996	2000	2004		12 years (25/37)	0	1	2	3	
51	Nikolay Kozlov	1972	1.92 m (6 ft 4 in)	(International Olympic Committee) Unified Team	FP	1992					12 years (20/32)	0	1	2	3	
51	Nikolay Kozlov	1972	1.92 m (6 ft 4 in)	Russia	FP		1996	2000	2004		12 years (20/32)	0	1	2	3	
51	Aleksandar Ćirić	1977	1.92 m (6 ft 4 in)	FR Yugoslavia	FP	2000					8 years (22/30)	0	1	2	3	
51	Aleksandar Ćirić	1977	1.92 m (6 ft 4 in)	Serbia and Montenegro	FP		2004				8 years (22/30)	0	1	2	3	
51	Aleksandar Ćirić	1977	1.92 m (6 ft 4 in)	Serbia	FP			2008			8 years (22/30)	0	1	2	3	
51	Aleksandar Šapić	1978	1.88 m (6 ft 2 in)	FR Yugoslavia	FP	1996	2000				12 years (18/30)	0	1	2	3	
51	Aleksandar Šapić	1978	1.88 m (6 ft 2 in)	Serbia and Montenegro	FP			2004			12 years (18/30)	0	1	2	3	
51	Aleksandar Šapić	1978	1.88 m (6 ft 2 in)	Serbia	FP				2008		12 years (18/30)	0	1	2	3	
51	Dejan Savić	1975	1.90 m (6 ft 3 in)	FR Yugoslavia	FP	1996	2000				12 years (21/33)	0	1	2	3	
51	Dejan Savić	1975	1.90 m (6 ft 3 in)	Serbia and Montenegro	FP			2004			12 years (21/33)	0	1	2	3	
51	Dejan Savić	1975	1.90 m (6 ft 3 in)	Serbia	FP				2008		12 years (21/33)	0	1	2	3	
51	Vladimir Vujasinović	1973	1.87 m (6 ft 2 in)	FR Yugoslavia	FP	1996	2000				12 years (22/34)	0	1	2	3	
51	Vladimir Vujasinović	1973	1.87 m (6 ft 2 in)	Serbia and Montenegro	FP			2004			12 years (22/34)	0	1	2	3	
51	Vladimir Vujasinović	1973	1.87 m (6 ft 2 in)	Serbia	FP				2008		12 years (22/34)	0	1	2	3	
51	Vanja Udovičić	1982	1.93 m (6 ft 4 in)	Serbia and Montenegro	FP	2004					8 years (21/29)	0	1	2	3	
51	Vanja Udovičić	1982	1.93 m (6 ft 4 in)	Serbia	FP		2008	2012			8 years (21/29)	0	1	2	3	
Rk	Player	Birth	Height	Men's team	Pos	1	2	3	4	5	Period (age of first/last)	G	S	B	T	Ref
Rk	Player	Birth	Height	Men's team	Pos	Water polo tournaments					Period (age of first/last)	Medals				Ref

Sources:

- Sports Reference: Athlete Medal Leaders (1900–2016);
- Official Results Books (PDF): 2000 (p. 27), 2004 (p. 89), 2008 (p. 79), 2012 (p. 370), 2016 (p. 6), 2020 (p. 11).

== Multiple medalists by team ==
The following tables are pre-sorted by total number of Olympic medals (in descending order), number of Olympic gold medals (in descending order), number of Olympic silver medals (in descending order), year of receiving the last Olympic medal (in ascending order), year of receiving the first Olympic medal (in ascending order), name of the player (in ascending order), respectively.

Legend

- Year^{*} – As host team
- Team^{†} – Defunct team

=== Belgium ===
- Men's national team: Belgium
- Team appearances: 11 (1900, 1908–1928, 1936–1952, 1960–1964)
- As host team: 1920^{*}

* Number of five-time Olympic medalists: 0

- Number of four-time Olympic medalists: 1
- Number of three-time Olympic medalists: 3
- Last updated: 1 May 2021.

Legend

- – Hosts

Male athletes who won three or more Olympic medals in water polo
Rk	Player	Birth	Height	Pos	Water polo tournaments					Period (age of first/last)	Medals				Ref
Rk	Player	Birth	Height	Pos	1	2	3	4	5	Period (age of first/last)	G	S	B	T	Ref
1	Joseph Pletincx	1888		FP	1908	1912	1920	1924		16 years (20/36)	0	3	1	4	
2	Oscar Grégoire	1877		FP	1900	1908	1912			12 years (23/35)	0	2	1	3	
2	Albert Durant	1892		GK	1912	1920	1924			12 years (20/32)	0	2	1	3	
2	Gérard Blitz	1901		FP	1920	1924	1928		1936	16 years (19/35)	0	2	1	3	

=== Croatia ===
- Men's national team: Croatia
- Team appearances: 7 (1996–2020)
- As host team: —
- Related team: Yugoslavia^{†}

* Number of four-time Olympic medalists: 0

- Number of three-time Olympic medalists: 1
- Last updated: 1 May 2021.

Abbreviation

- CRO – Croatia
- YUG – Yugoslavia

Male athletes who won three or more Olympic medals in water polo
Rk	Player	Birth	Height	Pos	Water polo tournaments					Period (age of first/last)	Medals				Ref
Rk	Player	Birth	Height	Pos	1	2	3	4	5	Period (age of first/last)	G	S	B	T	Ref
1	Perica Bukić	1966	1.98 m (6 ft 6 in)	FP	1984; YUG	1988; YUG		1996; CRO		12 years (18/30)	2	1	0	3	

=== France ===
- Men's national team: France
- Team appearances: 11 (1900^{*}, 1912–1928, 1936–1948, 1960, 1988–1992, 2016)
- As host team: 1900^{*}, 1924^{*}

* Number of four-time Olympic medalists: 0

- Number of three-time Olympic medalists: 0
- Last updated: 1 May 2021.

=== Germany ===
- Men's national team: Germany
- Team appearances: 9 (1900, 1928–1936^{*}, 1952, 1992–1996, 2004–2008)
- As host team: 1936^{*}
- Related team: West Germany^{†}

* Number of four-time Olympic medalists: 0

- Number of three-time Olympic medalists: 1
- Last updated: 1 May 2021.

Legend

- – Hosts

Male athletes who won three or more Olympic medals in water polo
Rk	Player	Birth	Height	Pos	Water polo tournaments					Period (age of first/last)	Medals				Ref
Rk	Player	Birth	Height	Pos	1	2	3	4	5	Period (age of first/last)	G	S	B	T	Ref
1	Fritz Gunst	1908		FP	1928	1932	1936			8 years (19/27)	1	2	0	3	

=== Great Britain ===
- Men's national team: Great Britain
- Team appearances: 11 (1900, 1908^{*}–1928, 1936–1956, 2012^{*})
- As host team: 1908^{*}, 1948^{*}, 2012^{*}

* Number of four-time Olympic medalists: 0

- Number of three-time Olympic medalists: 2
- Last updated: 1 May 2021.

Legend

- – Hosts

Male athletes who won three or more Olympic medals in water polo
Rk	Player	Birth	Height	Pos	Water polo tournaments					Period (age of first/last)	Medals				Ref
Rk	Player	Birth	Height	Pos	1	2	3	4	5	Period (age of first/last)	G	S	B	T	Ref
1	Paul Radmilovic	1886	1.80 m (5 ft 11 in)	FP	1908	1912	1920	1924	1928	20 years (22/42)	3	0	0	3	
1	Charles Smith	1879	1.86 m (6 ft 1 in)	GK	1908	1912	1920	1924		16 years (29/45)	3	0	0	3	

=== Greece ===
- Men's national team: Greece
- Team appearances: 16 (1920–1924, 1948, 1968–1972, 1980–2020)
- As host team: 2004^{*}

* Number of four-time Olympic medalists: 0

- Number of three-time Olympic medalists: 0
- Last updated: 11 August 2021.

=== Hungary ===
- Men's national team: Hungary
- Team appearances: 23 (1912, 1924–1980, 1988–2020)
- As host team: —

* Number of five-time Olympic medalists: 1

- Number of four-time Olympic medalists: 6
- Number of three-time Olympic medalists: 19
- Last updated: 11 August 2021.

Male athletes who won three or more Olympic medals in water polo
Rk	Player	Birth	Height	Pos	Water polo tournaments					Period (age of first/last)	Medals				Ref
Rk	Player	Birth	Height	Pos	1	2	3	4	5	Period (age of first/last)	G	S	B	T	Ref
1	Dezső Gyarmati	1927	1.86 m (6 ft 1 in)	FP	1948	1952	1956	1960	1964	16 years (20/36)	3	1	1	5	
2	György Kárpáti	1935	1.67 m (5 ft 6 in)	FP	1952	1956	1960	1964		12 years (17/29)	3	0	1	4	
3	László Jeney	1923	1.81 m (5 ft 11 in)	GK	1948	1952	1956	1960		12 years (25/37)	2	1	1	4	
4	Mihály Mayer	1933	1.85 m (6 ft 1 in)	FP	1956	1960	1964	1968		12 years (22/34)	2	0	2	4	
5	András Bodnár	1942	1.80 m (5 ft 11 in)	FP	1960	1964	1968	1972		12 years (18/30)	1	1	2	4	
5	Endre Molnár	1945	1.85 m (6 ft 1 in)	GK	1968	1972	1976	1980		12 years (23/35)	1	1	2	4	
5	István Szívós Jr.	1948	2.02 m (6 ft 8 in)	FP	1968	1972	1976	1980		12 years (20/32)	1	1	2	4	
8	Tibor Benedek	1972	1.90 m (6 ft 3 in)	FP	1992	1996	2000	2004	2008	16 years (20/36)	3	0	0	3	
8	Péter Biros	1976	1.96 m (6 ft 5 in)	FP	2000	2004	2008	2012		12 years (24/36)	3	0	0	3	
8	Tamás Kásás	1976	2.00 m (6 ft 7 in)	FP	1996	2000	2004	2008	2012	16 years (20/36)	3	0	0	3	
8	Gergely Kiss	1977	1.98 m (6 ft 6 in)	FP	2000	2004	2008	2012		12 years (22/34)	3	0	0	3	
8	Tamás Molnár	1975	1.93 m (6 ft 4 in)	FP	2000	2004	2008			8 years (25/33)	3	0	0	3	
8	Zoltán Szécsi	1977	1.98 m (6 ft 6 in)	GK	2000	2004	2008	2012		12 years (22/34)	3	0	0	3	
14	Olivér Halassy	1909	1.55 m (5 ft 1 in)	FP	1928	1932	1936			8 years (18/27)	2	1	0	3	
14	Márton Homonnai	1906	1.85 m (6 ft 1 in)	FP	1924	1928	1932	1936		12 years (18/30)	2	1	0	3	
14	István Szívós Sr.	1920	1.85 m (6 ft 1 in)	FP	1948	1952	1956			8 years (27/36)	2	1	0	3	
17	Kálmán Markovits	1931	1.78 m (5 ft 10 in)	FP	1952	1956	1960			8 years (20/28)	2	0	1	3	
17	Ottó Boros	1929	1.86 m (6 ft 1 in)	GK	1956	1960	1964			8 years (27/35)	2	0	1	3	
17	Tivadar Kanizsa	1933	1.80 m (5 ft 11 in)	FP	1956	1960	1964			8 years (23/31)	2	0	1	3	
20	Dénes Pócsik	1940	1.95 m (6 ft 5 in)	FP	1964	1968	1972			8 years (24/32)	1	1	1	3	
20	Ferenc Konrád	1945	1.83 m (6 ft 0 in)	FP	1968	1972	1976			8 years (23/31)	1	1	1	3	
20	László Sárosi	1946	1.83 m (6 ft 0 in)	FP	1968	1972	1976			8 years (22/29)	1	1	1	3	
20	Tamás Faragó	1952	1.94 m (6 ft 4 in)	FP	1972	1976	1980			8 years (20/27)	1	1	1	3	
24	Zoltán Dömötör	1935	1.86 m (6 ft 1 in)	FP	1960	1964	1968			8 years (25/33)	1	0	2	3	
24	László Felkai	1941	1.80 m (5 ft 11 in)	FP	1960	1964	1968			8 years (19/27)	1	0	2	3	
24	János Konrád	1941	1.83 m (6 ft 0 in)	FP	1960	1964	1968			8 years (18/27)	1	0	2	3	
Rk	Player	Birth	Height	Pos	1	2	3	4	5	Period (age of first/last)	G	S	B	T	Ref
Rk	Player	Birth	Height	Pos	Water polo tournaments					Period (age of first/last)	Medals				Ref

=== Italy ===
- Men's national team: Italy
- Team appearances: 21 (1920–1924, 1948–2020)
- As host team: 1960^{*}

* Number of four-time Olympic medalists: 0

- Number of three-time Olympic medalists: 0
- Last updated: 1 May 2021.

=== Netherlands ===
- Men's national team: Netherlands
- Team appearances: 17 (1908, 1920–1928^{*}, 1936–1952, 1960–1984, 1992–2000)
- As host team: 1928^{*}

* Number of four-time Olympic medalists: 0

- Number of three-time Olympic medalists: 0
- Last updated: 1 May 2021.

=== Russia ===
- Men's national team: Russia
- Team appearances: 3 (1996–2004)
- As host team: —
- Related teams: Soviet Union^{†}, Unified Team^{†}

* Number of four-time Olympic medalists: 0

- Number of three-time Olympic medalists: 2
- Last updated: 1 May 2021.

Abbreviation

- EUN – Unified Team
- RUS – Russia

Male athletes who won three or more Olympic medals in water polo
Rk	Player	Birth	Height	Pos	Water polo tournaments					Period (age of first/last)	Medals				Ref
Rk	Player	Birth	Height	Pos	1	2	3	4	5	Period (age of first/last)	G	S	B	T	Ref
1	Dmitry Gorshkov	1967	1.80 m (5 ft 11 in)	FP	1992; EUN	1996; RUS	2000; RUS	2004; RUS		12 years (25/37)	0	1	2	3	
1	Nikolay Kozlov	1972	1.92 m (6 ft 4 in)	FP	1992; EUN	1996; RUS	2000; RUS	2004; RUS		12 years (20/32)	0	1	2	3	

=== Serbia ===
- Men's national team: Serbia
- Team appearances: 4 (2008–2020)
- As host team: —
- Related teams: Yugoslavia^{†}, FR Yugoslavia^{†}, Serbia and Montenegro^{†}

* Number of four-time Olympic medalists: 4

- Number of three-time Olympic medalists: 13
- Last updated: 11 August 2024.

Abbreviation

- FRY – FR Yugoslavia
- SCG – Serbia and Montenegro
- SRB – Serbia

Male athletes who won three or more Olympic medals in water polo
Rk	Player	Birth	Height	Pos	Water polo tournaments					Period (age of first/last)	Medals				Ref
Rk	Player	Birth	Height	Pos	1	2	3	4	5	Period (age of first/last)	G	S	B	T	Ref
1	Dušan Mandić	1994	2.02 m (6 ft 8 in)	FP	2012	2016	2020	2024		12 years (18/30)	3	0	1	4	
2	Filip Filipović	1987	1.96 m (6 ft 5 in)	FP	2008	2012	2016	2020		13 years (21/34)	2	0	2	4	
2	Duško Pijetlović	1985	1.97 m (6 ft 6 in)	FP	2008	2012	2016	2020		13 years (23/36)	2	0	2	4	
2	Andrija Prlainović	1987	1.87 m (6 ft 2 in)	FP	2008	2012	2016	2020		13 years (21/34)	2	0	2	4	
5	Nikola Jakšić	1997	1.96 m (6 ft 5 in)	FP	2016	2020	2024			8 years (19/27)	3	0	0	3	
5	Sava Ranđelović	1993	1.93 m (6 ft 4 in)	FP	2016	2020	2024			8 years (23/31)	3	0	0	3	
7	Milan Aleksić	1986	1.93 m (6 ft 4 in)	FP	2012	2016	2020			9 years (26/35)	2	0	1	3	
7	Stefan Mitrović	1988	1.95 m (6 ft 5 in)	FP	2012	2016	2020			9 years (24/33)	2	0	1	3	
7	Gojko Pijetlović	1983	1.94 m (6 ft 4 in)	GK	2012	2016	2020			9 years (29/38)	2	0	1	3	
4	Slobodan Nikić	1983	1.97 m (6 ft 6 in)	FP	2004; SCG		2012; SRB	2016; SRB		12 years (21/33)	1	1	1	3	
9	Živko Gocić	1982	1.93 m (6 ft 4 in)	FP	2008	2012	2016			8 years (25/33)	1	0	2	3	
10	Aleksandar Ćirić	1977	1.92 m (6 ft 4 in)	FP	2000; FRY	2004; SCG	2008; SRB			8 years (22/30)	0	1	2	3	
10	Aleksandar Šapić	1978	1.88 m (6 ft 2 in)	FP	1996; FRY	2000; FRY	2004; SCG	2008; SRB		12 years (18/30)	0	1	2	3	
10	Dejan Savić	1975	1.90 m (6 ft 3 in)	FP	1996; FRY	2000; FRY	2004; SCG	2008; SRB		12 years (21/33)	0	1	2	3	
10	Vladimir Vujasinović	1973	1.87 m (6 ft 2 in)	FP	1996; FRY	2000; FRY	2004; SCG	2008; SRB		12 years (22/34)	0	1	2	3	
10	Vanja Udovičić	1982	1.93 m (6 ft 4 in)	FP	2004; SCG	2008; SRB	2012; SRB			8 years (21/29)	0	1	2	3	
Rk	Player	Birth	Height	Pos	1	2	3	4	5	Period (age of first/last)	G	S	B	T	Ref
Rk	Player	Birth	Height	Pos	Water polo tournaments					Period (age of first/last)	Medals				Ref

=== Serbia and Montenegro ===
- Men's national team: Serbia and Montenegro^{†}
- Team appearances: 1 (2004)
- As host team: —
- Related teams: Yugoslavia^{†}, FR Yugoslavia^{†}, Montenegro, Serbia
- Number of five-time Olympic medalists: 0
- Number of four-time Olympic medalists: 0
- Number of three-time Olympic medalists: 0
- Last updated: 1 May 2021.

Notes:

- Aleksandar Ćirić is listed in section Serbia.
- Slobodan Nikić is listed in section Serbia.
- Aleksandar Šapić is listed in section Serbia.
- Dejan Savić is listed in section Serbia.
- Vanja Udovičić is listed in section Serbia.
- Vladimir Vujasinović is listed in section Serbia.

=== Soviet Union ===
- Men's national team: Soviet Union^{†}
- Team appearances: 9 (1952–1980^{*}, 1988)
- As host team: 1980^{*}
- Related teams: Unified Team^{†}, Russia
- Number of four-time Olympic medalists: 0
- Number of three-time Olympic medalists: 4
- Last updated: 1 May 2021.

Legend

- – Hosts

Male athletes who won three or more Olympic medals in water polo
Rk	Player	Birth	Height	Pos	Water polo tournaments					Period (age of first/last)	Medals				Ref
Rk	Player	Birth	Height	Pos	1	2	3	4	5	Period (age of first/last)	G	S	B	T	Ref
1	Aleksei Barkalov	1946	1.80 m (5 ft 11 in)	FP	1968	1972	1976	1980		12 years (22/34)	2	1	0	3	
2	Leonid Osipov	1943	1.87 m (6 ft 2 in)	FP	1964	1968	1972			8 years (21/29)	1	1	1	3	
3	Vladimir Semyonov	1938	1.84 m (6 ft 0 in)	FP	1960	1964	1968			8 years (22/30)	0	2	1	3	
3	Viktor Ageyev	1936	1.84 m (6 ft 0 in)	FP	1956	1960	1964			8 years (20/28)	0	1	2	3	

Note:

- Yevgeny Sharonov is listed in section Unified Team.

=== Spain ===
- Men's national team: Spain
- Team appearances: 18 (1920–1928, 1948–1952, 1968–1972, 1980–2020)
- As host team: 1992^{*}

* Number of four-time Olympic medalists: 0

- Number of three-time Olympic medalists: 0
- Last updated: 1 May 2021.

=== Sweden ===
- Men's national team: Sweden
- Team appearances: 8 (1908–1924, 1936–1952, 1980)
- As host team: 1912^{*}

* Number of four-time Olympic medalists: 0

- Number of three-time Olympic medalists: 4
- Last updated: 1 May 2021.

Legend

- – Hosts

Male athletes who won three or more Olympic medals in water polo
Rk	Player	Birth	Height	Pos	Water polo tournaments					Period (age of first/last)	Medals				Ref
Rk	Player	Birth	Height	Pos	1	2	3	4	5	Period (age of first/last)	G	S	B	T	Ref
1	Robert Andersson	1886		FP	1908	1912	1920			12 years (21/33)	0	1	2	3	
1	Pontus Hanson	1884		FP	1908	1912	1920			12 years (24/36)	0	1	2	3	
1	Harald Julin	1890		FP	1908	1912	1920			12 years (18/30)	0	1	2	3	
1	Torsten Kumfeldt	1886		GK	1908	1912	1920			12 years (22/34)	0	1	2	3	

=== Unified Team ===
- Men's national team: (International Olympic Committee) Unified Team^{†}
- Team appearances: 1 (1992)
- As host team: —
- Related teams: Soviet Union^{†}, Russia
- Number of four-time Olympic medalists: 0
- Number of three-time Olympic medalists: 1
- Last updated: 1 May 2021.

Legend and abbreviation

- – Hosts
- EUN – Unified Team
- URS – Soviet Union

Male athletes who won three or more Olympic medals in water polo
Rk	Player	Birth	Height	Pos	Water polo tournaments					Period (age of first/last)	Medals				Ref
Rk	Player	Birth	Height	Pos	1	2	3	4	5	Period (age of first/last)	G	S	B	T	Ref
1	Yevgeny Sharonov	1958	1.89 m (6 ft 2 in)	GK	1980; URS		1988; URS	1992; EUN		12 years (21/33)	1	0	2	3	

Notes:

- Dmitry Gorshkov is listed in section Russia.
- Nikolay Kozlov is listed in section Russia.

=== United States ===
- Men's national team: United States
- Team appearances: 22 (1920–1972, 1984^{*}–2020)
- As host team: 1932^{*}, 1984^{*}, 1996^{*}

* Number of four-time Olympic medalists: 0

- Number of three-time Olympic medalists: 0
- Last updated: 1 May 2021.

=== West Germany ===
- Men's national team: West Germany^{†}
- Team appearances: 5 (1968–1976, 1984–1988)
- As host team: 1972^{*}
- Related teams: Germany
- Number of four-time Olympic medalists: 0
- Number of three-time Olympic medalists: 0
- Last updated: 1 May 2021.

=== Yugoslavia ===
- Men's national team: Yugoslavia^{†}
- Team appearances: 12 (1936–1988)
- As host team: —
- Related teams: Croatia, FR Yugoslavia^{†}, Serbia and Montenegro^{†}, Montenegro, Serbia

* Number of four-time Olympic medalists: 0

- Number of three-time Olympic medalists: 0
- Last updated: 1 May 2021.

Note:

- Perica Bukić is listed in section Croatia.

=== FR Yugoslavia ===
- Men's national team: FR Yugoslavia^{†}
- Team appearances: 2 (1996–2000)
- As host team: —
- Related teams: Yugoslavia^{†}, Serbia and Montenegro^{†}, Montenegro, Serbia
- Number of four-time Olympic medalists: 0
- Number of three-time Olympic medalists: 0
- Last updated: 1 May 2021.

Notes:

- Aleksandar Ćirić is listed in section Serbia.
- Aleksandar Šapić is listed in section Serbia.
- Dejan Savić is listed in section Serbia.
- Vladimir Vujasinović is listed in section Serbia.

== See also ==
- Water polo at the Summer Olympics
- Lists of Olympic water polo records and statistics
  - List of men's Olympic water polo tournament records and statistics
  - List of women's Olympic water polo tournament records and statistics
  - List of Olympic champions in men's water polo
  - List of Olympic champions in women's water polo
  - National team appearances in the men's Olympic water polo tournament
  - National team appearances in the women's Olympic water polo tournament
  - List of players who have appeared in multiple men's Olympic water polo tournaments
  - List of players who have appeared in multiple women's Olympic water polo tournaments
  - List of Olympic medalists in water polo (women)
  - List of men's Olympic water polo tournament top goalscorers
  - List of women's Olympic water polo tournament top goalscorers
  - List of men's Olympic water polo tournament goalkeepers
  - List of women's Olympic water polo tournament goalkeepers
  - List of Olympic venues in water polo
- List of World Aquatics Championships medalists in water polo

== Sources ==
=== Official Reports (IOC) ===
PDF documents in the LA84 Foundation Digital Library:

- Official Report of the 1896 Olympic Games (download, archive)
- Official Report of the 1900 Olympic Games (download, archive)
- Official Report of the 1904 Olympic Games (download, archive)
- Official Report of the 1908 Olympic Games (download, archive) (pp. 359–361)
- Official Report of the 1912 Olympic Games (download, archive) (pp. 1021–1024, 1031–1037)
- Official Report of the 1920 Olympic Games (download, archive) (p. 130)
- Official Report of the 1924 Olympic Games (download, archive) (pp. 439–440, 486–494)
- Official Report of the 1928 Olympic Games (download, archive) (pp. 746–757, 797–807)
- Official Report of the 1932 Olympic Games (download, archive) (pp. 619–623, 646–652)
- Official Report of the 1936 Olympic Games, v.2 (download, archive) (pp. 345–356)
- Official Report of the 1948 Olympic Games (download, archive) (pp. 537–540, 640–647)
- Official Report of the 1952 Olympic Games (download, archive) (pp. 600–608)
- Official Report of the 1956 Olympic Games (download, archive) (pp. 592–594, 624–627)
- Official Report of the 1960 Olympic Games (download, archive) (pp. 552–555, 617–634)
- Official Report of the 1964 Olympic Games, v.2 (download, archive) (pp. 682–698)
- Official Report of the 1968 Olympic Games, v.3 (download, archive) (pp. 449–466, 811–826)
- Official Report of the 1972 Olympic Games, v.3 (download, archive) (pp. 331, 353–365)
- Official Report of the 1976 Olympic Games, v.3 (download, archive) (pp. 446–447, 484–497)
- Official Report of the 1980 Olympic Games, v.3 (download, archive) (pp. 458, 495–510)
- Official Report of the 1984 Olympic Games, v.2 (download, archive) (pp. 528–534)
- Official Report of the 1988 Olympic Games, v.2 (download, archive) (pp. 590–598)
- Official Report of the 1992 Olympic Games, v.5 (download, archive) (pp. 354, 386–400)
- Official Report of the 1996 Olympic Games, v.3 (download, archive) (pp. 56–73)

=== Official Results Books (IOC) ===
PDF documents in the LA84 Foundation Digital Library:

- Official Results Book – 2000 Olympic Games – Water Polo (download, archive)
- Official Results Book – 2004 Olympic Games – Water Polo (download, archive)
- Official Results Book – 2008 Olympic Games – Water Polo (download, archive)

PDF documents on the FINA website:

- Official Results Book – 2012 Olympic Games – Diving, Swimming, Synchronised Swimming, Water Polo (archive) (pp. 284–507)

PDF documents in the Olympic World Library:

- Official Results Book – 2016 Olympic Games – Water Polo (archive)

PDF documents on the International Olympic Committee website:

- Official Results Book – 2020 Olympic Games – Water Polo (archive)
- Official Results Book – 2024 Olympic Games – Water Polo

=== Official Reports (FINA) ===
PDF documents on the FINA website:

- HistoFINA – Water polo medalists and statistics (as of September 2019) (archive) (pp. 4–13)
- 1870–2020 | 150 years of Water Polo – Evolution of its rules (archive)

=== Official website (IOC) ===
Water polo on the International Olympic Committee website:

- Water polo
- Men's water polo

=== Olympedia ===
Water polo on the Olympedia website:

- Water polo Archived 2021-12-28 at the Wayback Machine
- Men's water polo
- Athlete count for water polo
- Water polo venues
- Water polo at the 1900 Summer Olympics (men's tournament)
- Water polo at the 1904 Summer Olympics (men's tournament)
- Water polo at the 1908 Summer Olympics (men's tournament)
- Water polo at the 1912 Summer Olympics (men's tournament)
- Water polo at the 1920 Summer Olympics (men's tournament)
- Water polo at the 1924 Summer Olympics (men's tournament)
- Water polo at the 1928 Summer Olympics (men's tournament)
- Water polo at the 1932 Summer Olympics (men's tournament)
- Water polo at the 1936 Summer Olympics (men's tournament)
- Water polo at the 1948 Summer Olympics (men's tournament)
- Water polo at the 1952 Summer Olympics (men's tournament)
- Water polo at the 1956 Summer Olympics (men's tournament)
- Water polo at the 1960 Summer Olympics (men's tournament)
- Water polo at the 1964 Summer Olympics (men's tournament)
- Water polo at the 1968 Summer Olympics (men's tournament)
- Water polo at the 1972 Summer Olympics (men's tournament)
- Water polo at the 1976 Summer Olympics (men's tournament)
- Water polo at the 1980 Summer Olympics (men's tournament)
- Water polo at the 1984 Summer Olympics (men's tournament)
- Water polo at the 1988 Summer Olympics (men's tournament)
- Water polo at the 1992 Summer Olympics (men's tournament)
- Water polo at the 1996 Summer Olympics (men's tournament)
- Water polo at the 2000 Summer Olympics (men's tournament)
- Water polo at the 2004 Summer Olympics (men's tournament)
- Water polo at the 2008 Summer Olympics (men's tournament)
- Water polo at the 2012 Summer Olympics (men's tournament)
- Water polo at the 2016 Summer Olympics (men's tournament)
- Water polo at the 2020 Summer Olympics (men's tournament)

=== Sports Reference ===
Water polo on the Sports Reference website:

- Country Medal Leaders & Athlete Medal Leaders (1900–2016) (archived)
- Men's water polo (1900–2016) (archived)
- Water polo at the 1900 Summer Games (men's tournament) (archived)
- Water polo at the 1904 Summer Games (men's tournament) (archived)
- Water polo at the 1908 Summer Games (men's tournament) (archived)
- Water polo at the 1912 Summer Games (men's tournament) (archived)
- Water polo at the 1920 Summer Games (men's tournament) (archived)
- Water polo at the 1924 Summer Games (men's tournament) (archived)
- Water polo at the 1928 Summer Games (men's tournament) (archived)
- Water polo at the 1932 Summer Games (men's tournament) (archived)
- Water polo at the 1936 Summer Games (men's tournament) (archived)
- Water polo at the 1948 Summer Games (men's tournament) (archived)
- Water polo at the 1952 Summer Games (men's tournament) (archived)
- Water polo at the 1956 Summer Games (men's tournament) (archived)
- Water polo at the 1960 Summer Games (men's tournament) (archived)
- Water polo at the 1964 Summer Games (men's tournament) (archived)
- Water polo at the 1968 Summer Games (men's tournament) (archived)
- Water polo at the 1972 Summer Games (men's tournament) (archived)
- Water polo at the 1976 Summer Games (men's tournament) (archived)
- Water polo at the 1980 Summer Games (men's tournament) (archived)
- Water polo at the 1984 Summer Games (men's tournament) (archived)
- Water polo at the 1988 Summer Games (men's tournament) (archived)
- Water polo at the 1992 Summer Games (men's tournament) (archived)
- Water polo at the 1996 Summer Games (men's tournament) (archived)
- Water polo at the 2000 Summer Games (men's tournament) (archived)
- Water polo at the 2004 Summer Games (men's tournament) (archived)
- Water polo at the 2008 Summer Games (men's tournament) (archived)
- Water polo at the 2012 Summer Games (men's tournament) (archived)
- Water polo at the 2016 Summer Games (men's tournament) (archived)
- Water polo at the 2020 Summer Games (men's tournament) (archived)

=== Todor66 ===
Water polo on the Todor66 website:

- Water polo at the Summer Games
- Water polo at the 1900 Summer Olympics (men's tournament)
- Water polo at the 1904 Summer Olympics (men's tournament)
- Water polo at the 1908 Summer Olympics (men's tournament)
- Water polo at the 1912 Summer Olympics (men's tournament)
- Water polo at the 1920 Summer Olympics (men's tournament)
- Water polo at the 1924 Summer Olympics (men's tournament)
- Water polo at the 1928 Summer Olympics (men's tournament)
- Water polo at the 1932 Summer Olympics (men's tournament)
- Water polo at the 1936 Summer Olympics (men's tournament)
- Water polo at the 1948 Summer Olympics (men's tournament)
- Water polo at the 1952 Summer Olympics (men's tournament)
- Water polo at the 1956 Summer Olympics (men's tournament)
- Water polo at the 1960 Summer Olympics (men's tournament)
- Water polo at the 1964 Summer Olympics (men's tournament)
- Water polo at the 1968 Summer Olympics (men's tournament, men's qualification)
- Water polo at the 1972 Summer Olympics (men's tournament, men's qualification)
- Water polo at the 1976 Summer Olympics (men's tournament, men's European qualification)
- Water polo at the 1980 Summer Olympics (men's tournament, men's European qualification, men's world qualification)
- Water polo at the 1984 Summer Olympics (men's tournament, men's qualification)
- Water polo at the 1988 Summer Olympics (men's tournament, men's qualification)
- Water polo at the 1992 Summer Olympics (men's tournament, men's qualification)
- Water polo at the 1996 Summer Olympics (men's tournament, men's qualification)
- Water polo at the 2000 Summer Olympics (men's tournament, men's qualification)
- Water polo at the 2004 Summer Olympics (men's tournament, men's qualification)
- Water polo at the 2008 Summer Olympics (men's tournament, men's qualification)
- Water polo at the 2012 Summer Olympics (men's tournament, men's qualification)
- Water polo at the 2016 Summer Olympics (men's tournament, men's qualification)
- Water polo at the 2020 Summer Olympics (men's tournament, men's qualification)
- Water polo at the 2024 Summer Olympics (men's tournament, men's qualification)
