= Nodar Gvakhariya =

Soviet water polo player

Personal information
- Born: 3 February 1932 Tbilisi, Soviet Union
- Died: 14 November 1996 (aged 64)

Sport
- Sport: Water polo
Medal record
Representing Soviet Union
Olympic Games
Bronze medal – third place	1956 Melbourne	Team competition

Nodar Gvakharia (Georgian: ნოდარ გვახარია, 3 February 1932 – 14 November 1996) was a Georgian water polo player, born in Tbilisi. who competed for the Soviet Union in the 1956 Summer Olympics.

He was part of the Soviet team which won the bronze medal in the 1956 tournament. He played three matches and scored four goals.

== See also ==
- List of Olympic medalists in water polo (men)
