= Vyacheslav Kurennoy =

Soviet water polo player

Personal information
- Born: 10 December 1932 Moscow, Soviet Union
- Died: 23 December 1992 (aged 60)

Sport
- Sport: Swimming
Medal record
Representing Soviet Union
Men's Water Polo
Olympic Games
Silver medal – second place	1960 Rome	Team competition
Bronze medal – third place	1956 Melbourne	Team competition
Men's swimming
European Championships
Bronze medal – third place	1954 Turin	4×200 m freestyle

Vyacheslav Grigorevich Kurennoy (Russian: Вячеслав Григорьевич Куренной, 10 December 1932 – 23 December 1992) was a Russian water polo player who competed for the Soviet Union in the 1956 Summer Olympics and in the 1960 Summer Olympics.

He was born in Moscow.

== Career ==
In 1956 he was a member of the Soviet team which won the bronze medal. He played all seven matches and scored three goals.

Four years later he won the silver medal with the Soviet team in the water polo competition at the 1960 Games. He played all seven matches and scored nine goals.

== See also ==
- List of Olympic medalists in water polo (men)
