= Boris Markarov =

Russian water polo player (1935–2023)

Personal information
- Born: March 12, 1935 Volkhov, Soviet Union
- Died: April 23, 2023 (aged 88) Saint Petersburg, Russia

Sport
- Sport: Water polo
Medal record
Representing Soviet Union
Olympic Games
Bronze medal – third place	1956 Melbourne	Team competition

Boris Nikitich Markarov (Russian: Борис Никитич Маркаров, 12 March 1935 – 23 April 2023) was a Russian water polo player who competed for the Soviet Union in the 1956 Summer Olympics.

Markarov was part of the Soviet team which won the bronze medal in the 1956 tournament. He played four matches and scored one goal.

Markarov died on 23 April 2023, at the age of 88.

== See also ==
- List of Olympic medalists in water polo (men)
