= János Konrád =

Hungarian water polo player

Personal information
- Born: 27 August 1941 Budapest, Hungary
- Died: 25 November 2014 (aged 73) Budapest, Hungary
- Height: 183 cm (6 ft 0 in)
- Weight: 83 kg (183 lb)

Sport
- Sport: Water polo
- Club: Budapesti VSC; Budapest Honvéd FC
Medal record
Men's Water Polo
Representing Hungary
Olympic Games
Bronze medal – third place	1960 Rome	Team competition
Gold medal – first place	1964 Tokyo	Team competition
Bronze medal – third place	1968 Mexico City	Team competition

János Konrád (27 August 1941 – 25 November 2014) was a Hungarian water polo player and backstroke swimmer who competed in the 1960 Summer Olympics, in the 1964 Summer Olympics, and in the 1968 Summer Olympics. He was born in Budapest. On 25 November 2014 he died at the age of 73.

Konrád was part of the Hungarian water polo team which won the bronze medal in the 1960 tournament. He played one match and scored one goal. He also participated in the 100 metre backstroke competition but was eliminated in the first round. Four years later he was a member of the Hungarian team which won the gold medal in the 1964 Olympic tournament. He played all six matches and scored two goals. At the 1968 Games he won his second bronze medal with the Hungarian team. He played all eight matches and scored three goals.

== See also ==
- Hungary men's Olympic water polo team records and statistics
- List of Olympic champions in men's water polo
- List of Olympic medalists in water polo (men)
