= Dénes Pócsik =

Hungarian water polo player

Personal information
- Born: 9 March 1940 Kunágota, Hungary
- Died: 20 November 2004 (aged 64) Eger, Hungary
- Height: 195 cm (6 ft 5 in)
- Weight: 93 kg (205 lb)

Sport
- Sport: Water polo
- Club: Eger SE
Medal record
Men's Water Polo
Representing Hungary
Olympic Games
Gold medal – first place	1964 Tokyo	Team competition
Bronze medal – third place	1968 Mexico City	Team competition
Silver medal – second place	1972 Munich	Team competition

Dénes Pócsik (9 March 1940 in Kunágota – 20 November 2004 in Eger) was a Hungarian water polo player who competed in the 1964 Summer Olympics, in the 1968 Summer Olympics, and in the 1972 Summer Olympics.

== See also ==
- Hungary men's Olympic water polo team records and statistics
- List of Olympic champions in men's water polo
- List of Olympic medalists in water polo (men)
