= Kálmán Markovits =

Hungarian water polo player

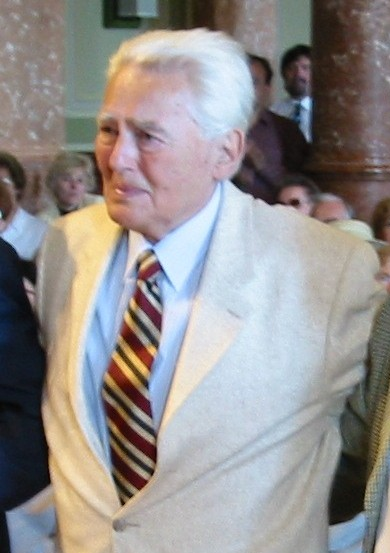

Personal information
- Born: 26 August 1931 Budapest, Hungary
- Died: 5 December 2009 (aged 78) Budapest, Hungary

Sport
- Sport: Water polo
Medal record
Representing Hungary
Olympic Games
Gold medal – first place	1952 Helsinki	Team competition
Gold medal – first place	1956 Melbourne	Team competition
Bronze medal – third place	1960 Rome	Team competition

Kálmán Markovits (26 August 1931 – 5 December 2009) was a Hungarian water polo player who competed in the 1952 Summer Olympics, 1956 Summer Olympics, and 1960 Summer Olympics.

Markovits was part of the Hungarian team which won the gold medal in the 1952 tournament. He played six matches and scored three goals.

Four years later he was a member of the Hungarian team which won again the gold medal in the 1956 Olympic tournament. He played six matches and scored at least three goals (not all scorers are known).

At the 1960 Games he won the bronze medal with the Hungarian team. He played four matches and scored one goal.

== See also ==
- Hungary men's Olympic water polo team records and statistics
- List of Olympic champions in men's water polo
- List of Olympic medalists in water polo (men)
- List of members of the International Swimming Hall of Fame
- Blood in the Water match
