= András Bodnár =

Hungarian water polo player (born 1942)

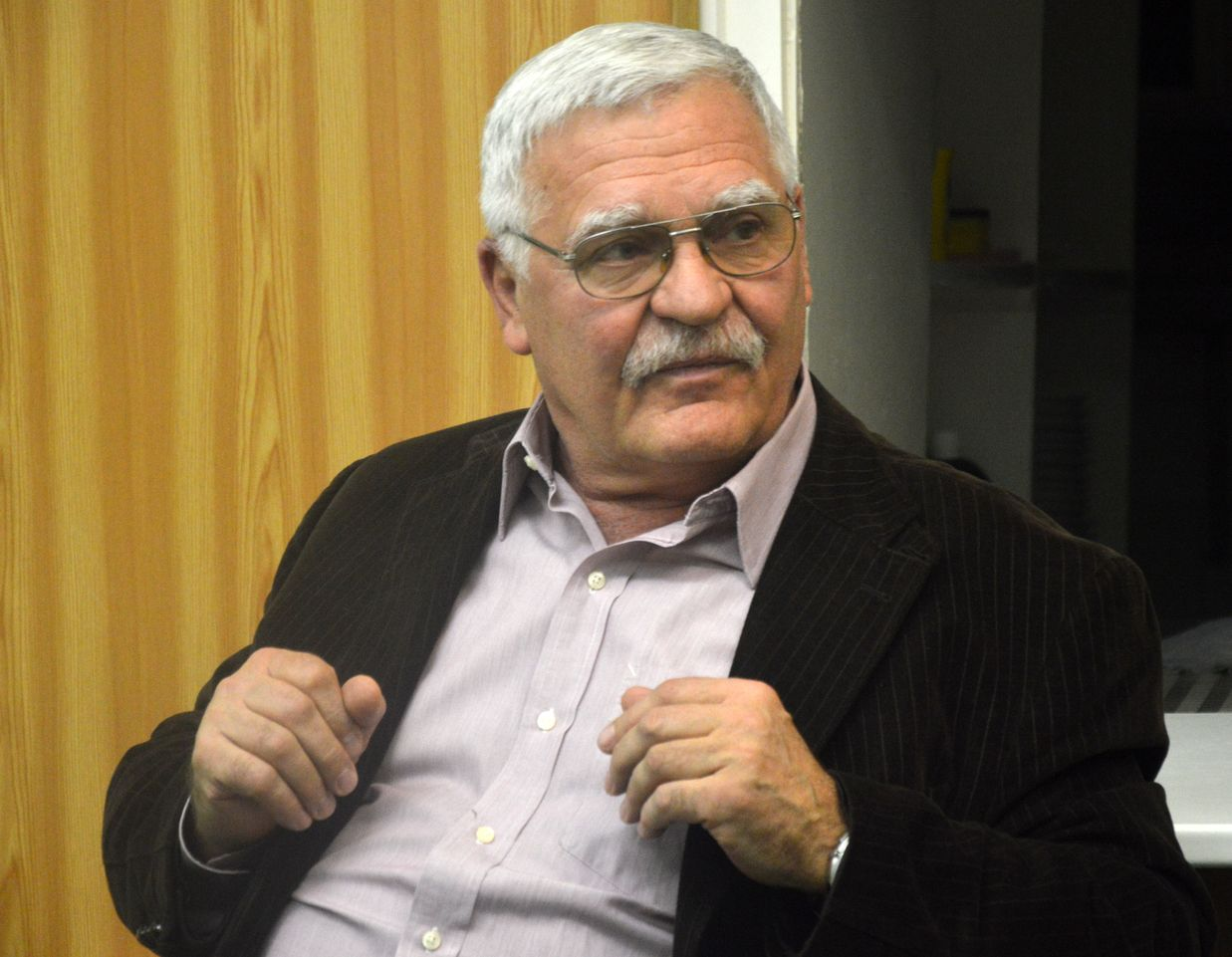

Personal information
- Born: 9 April 1942 (age 84) Ungvár, Kingdom of Hungary
- Height: 180 cm (5 ft 11 in)
- Weight: 78 kg (172 lb)

Sport
- Sport: Water polo
- Club: Egri VK
Medal record
Men's water polo
Representing Hungary
Olympic Games
Gold medal – first place	1964 Tokyo	Team competition
Silver medal – second place	1972 Munich	Team competition
Bronze medal – third place	1960 Rome	Team competition
Bronze medal – third place	1968 Mexico City	Team competition
World Championships
Gold medal – first place	1973 Belgrade	Team competition
Silver medal – second place	1975 Cali	Team competition

András Bodnár (born 9 April 1942) is a former Hungarian water polo player and freestyle swimmer who competed in the 1960 Summer Olympics, 1964 Summer Olympics, 1968 Summer Olympics and 1972 Summer Olympics. He is one of eight male athletes who won four or more Olympic medals in water polo.

Bodnár was born in Ungvár, Kingdom of Hungary. He was part of the Hungarian water polo team which won the bronze medal in the 1960 tournament. He played one match and scored one goal. He also participated in the 1500 metre freestyle competition but was eliminated in the first round.

Four years later he was a member of the Hungarian team which won the gold medal in the 1964 Olympic tournament. He played five matches and scored two goals. In the 400 metre freestyle event he was eliminated in the first round.

At the 1968 Games he won his second bronze medal with the Hungarian team. He played all eight matches and scored two goals.

His last Olympic tournament was in Munich 1972 where he won a silver medal. He played all eight matches and scored seven goals for the Hungarian team.

== See also ==
- Hungary men's Olympic water polo team records and statistics
- List of multiple Olympic medalists in one event
- List of Olympic champions in men's water polo
- List of Olympic medalists in water polo (men)
- List of players who have appeared in multiple men's Olympic water polo tournaments
- List of world champions in men's water polo
- List of World Aquatics Championships medalists in water polo
- List of members of the International Swimming Hall of Fame
