= István Hevesi =

Hungarian water polo player

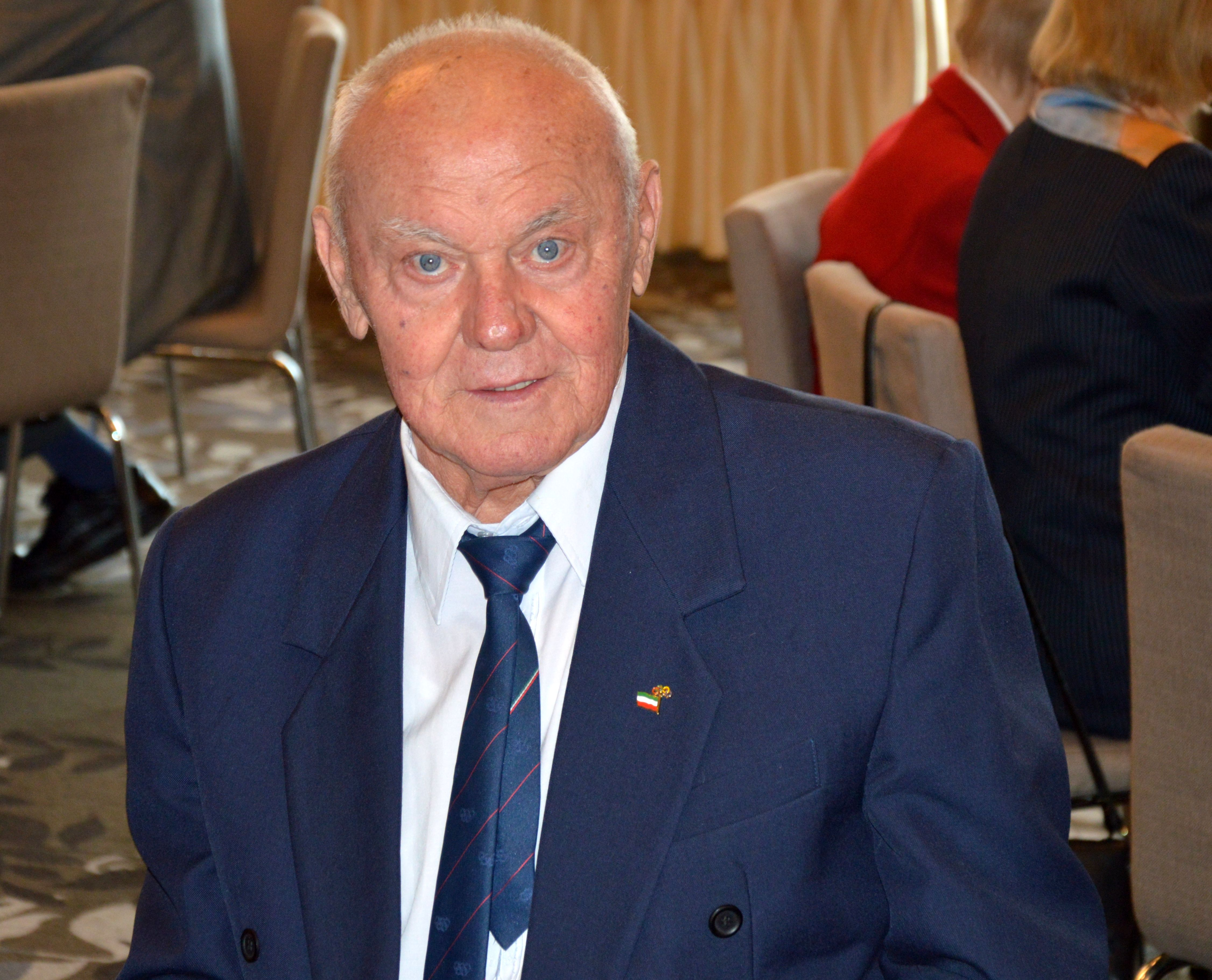

Personal information
- Born: April 2, 1931 Eger, Hungary
- Died: February 9, 2018 (aged 86) Budapest, Hungary

Sport
- Sport: Water polo
Medal record
Representing Hungary
Olympic Games
Gold medal – first place	1956 Melbourne	Team competition
Bronze medal – third place	1960 Rome	Team competition

István Hevesi (2 April 1931 – 9 February 2018) was a Hungarian water polo player who competed in the 1956 Summer Olympics and in the 1960 Summer Olympics. He was born in Eger.

Hevesi was part of the Hungarian team which won the gold medal in the 1956 tournament. He played in three matches. Four years later he was a member of the Hungarian team which won the bronze medal in the 1960 Olympic tournament. He played In five matches and scored one goal.

== See also ==
- Hungary men's Olympic water polo team records and statistics
- List of Olympic champions in men's water polo
- List of Olympic medalists in water polo (men)
- Blood in the Water match
