= Leonid Osipov =

Soviet water polo player (1943–2020)

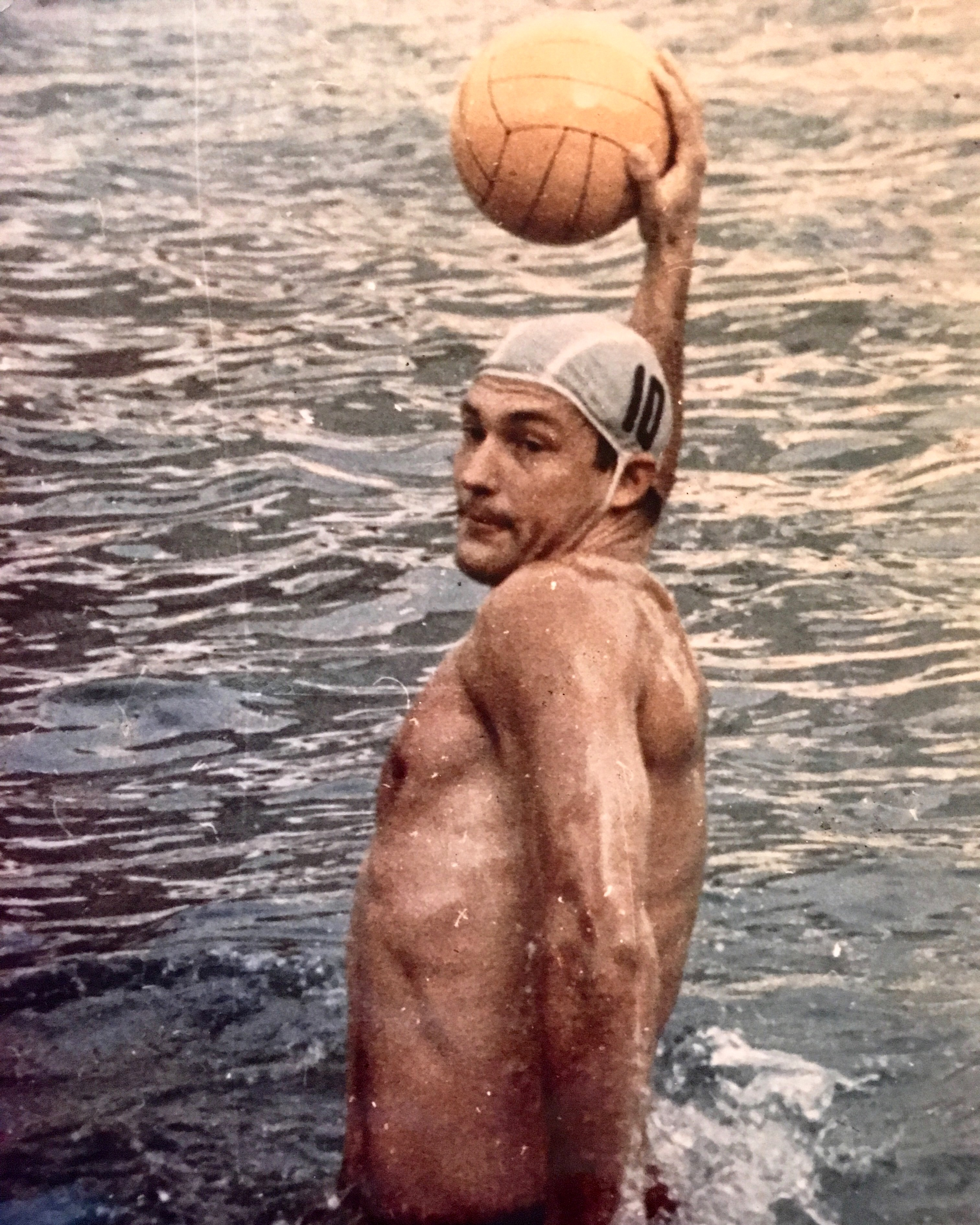

Personal information
- Born: 6 February 1943 Moscow, Soviet Union
- Died: 5 November 2020 (aged 77)

Sport
- Sport: Water polo
Medal record
Representing Soviet Union
Olympic Games
Gold medal – first place	1972 Munich	Team competition
Silver medal – second place	1968 Mexico City	Team competition
Bronze medal – third place	1964 Tokyo	Team competition
World Championships
Silver medal – second place	1973 Belgrade	Team competition
European Championships
Gold medal – first place	1966 Utrecht	Team competition
Gold medal – first place	1970 Barcelona	Team competition

Leonid Mikhaylovich Osipov (Russian: Леонид Михайлович Осипов, 6 February 1943 – 5 November 2020) was a Russian water polo player who competed for the Soviet Union in the 1964, 1968 and in the 1972 Summer Olympics.

== See also ==
- Soviet Union men's Olympic water polo team records and statistics
- List of Olympic champions in men's water polo
- List of Olympic medalists in water polo (men)
- List of World Aquatics Championships medalists in water polo
