= Pyotr Breus =

Soviet water polo player

Personal information
- Born: December 2, 1927 Moscow, Soviet Union
- Died: February 25, 2000 (aged 72)

Sport
- Sport: Water polo
Medal record
Representing Soviet Union
Olympic Games
Bronze medal – third place	1956 Melbourne	Team competition

Pyotr Pavlovich Breus Russian: Пётр Павлович Бреус, (December 2, 1927 – February 25, 2000) was a Russian water polo player who competed for the Soviet Union in the 1956 Summer Olympics, part of the team which won the bronze medal. He played in all seven matches and scored two goals.

== See also ==
- List of Olympic medalists in water polo (men)
