= Mihály Mayer =

Hungarian water polo player

Personal information
- Nationality: Hungarian
- Born: 27 December 1933 Újpest, Hungary
- Died: 4 September 2000 (aged 66) Budapest, Hungary
- Height: 185 cm (6 ft 1 in)
- Weight: 81 kg (179 lb)

Sport
- Sport: Water polo
- Club: Újpesti TE
Medal record
Men's Water Polo
Representing Hungary
Olympic Games
Gold medal – first place	1956 Melbourne	Team competition
Bronze medal – third place	1960 Rome	Team competition
Gold medal – first place	1964 Tokyo	Team competition
Bronze medal – third place	1968 Mexico City	Team competition

Mihály Mayer (27 December 1933 – 4 September 2000) was a Hungarian water polo player who competed in the 1956 Summer Olympics, 1960 Summer Olympics, 1964 Summer Olympics, and in the 1968 Summer Olympics. He is one of eight male athletes who won four or more Olympic medals in water polo.

He was Jewish, was born in Újpest, and died in Budapest.

Mayer was part of the Hungarian team which won the gold medal in the 1956 tournament. He played four matches and scored one goal.

Four years later he was a member of the Hungarian team which won the bronze medal in the 1960 Olympic tournament. He played three matches and scored one goal.

At the 1964 Games he won his second gold medal with the Hungarian team. He played five matches.

In 1968 he won again a bronze medal when the Hungarian team finished third in the Olympic tournament. He played all eight matches.

== Coach career ==
As a coach he led the Hungary men's national water polo team to the silver medal at the Guayaquil Water Polo World Championship in 1982.

== See also ==
- Hungary men's Olympic water polo team records and statistics
- List of multiple Olympic medalists in one event
- List of Olympic champions in men's water polo
- List of Olympic medalists in water polo (men)
- List of players who have appeared in multiple men's Olympic water polo tournaments
- List of members of the International Swimming Hall of Fame
- List of select Jewish water polo players
- Blood in the Water match
