= Fritz Gunst =

German water polo player (1908–1992)

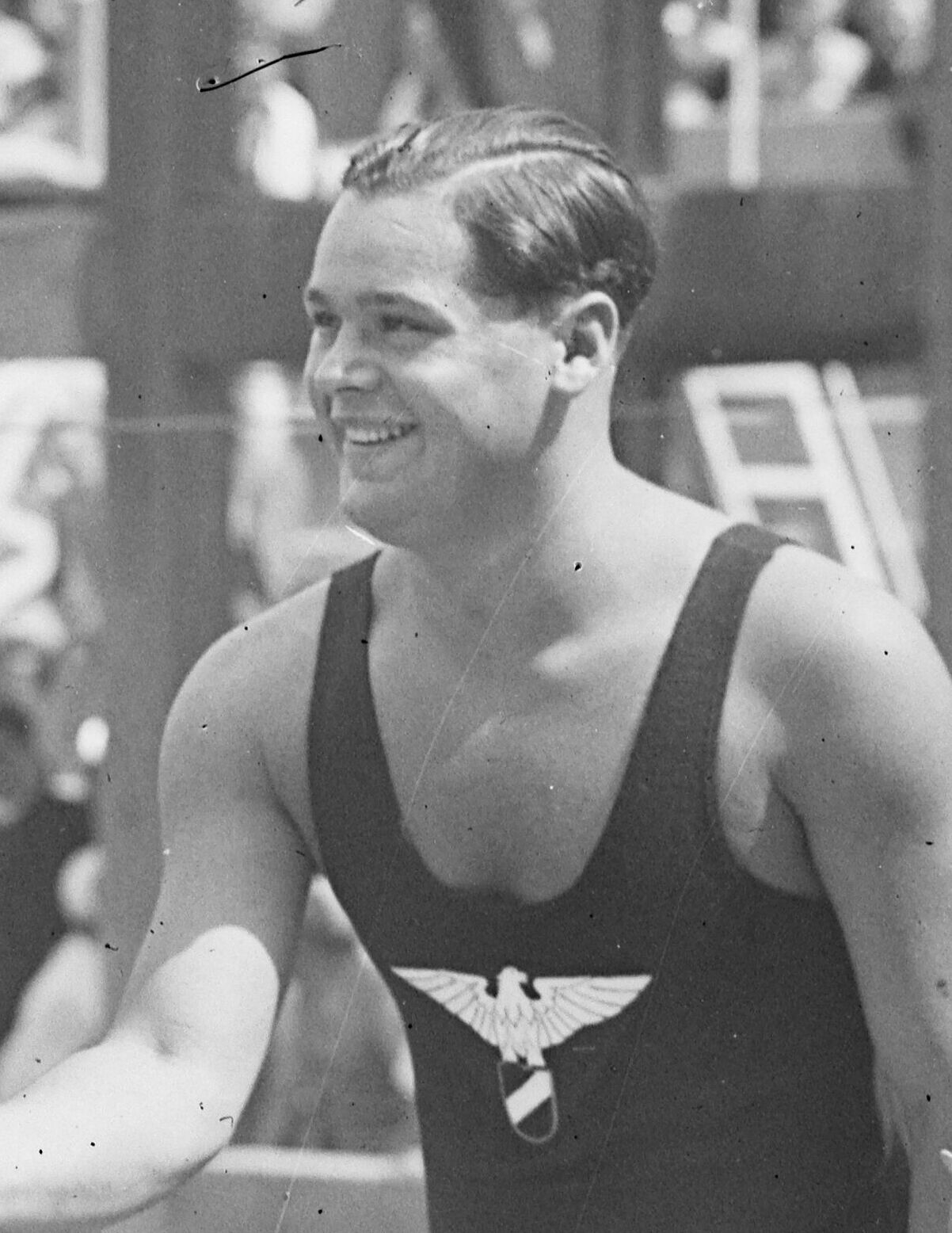

Personal information
- Born: 22 September 1908 Hanover, German Empire
- Died: 9 November 1992 (aged 84) Hanover, Germany

Sport
- Sport: Water polo
Medal record
Men's Water Polo
Representing Germany
Olympic Games
| Gold medal – first place | 1928 Amsterdam | Team competition |
| Silver medal – second place | 1932 Los Angeles | Team competition |
| Silver medal – second place | 1936 Berlin | Team competition |
European Championships
| Bronze medal – third place | 1926 Budapest | Team |
| Silver medal – second place | 1931 Paris | Team |
| Silver medal – second place | 1934 Magdeburg | Team |
| Silver medal – second place | 1938 London | Team |

Fritz "Itze" Gunst (22 September 1908 – 9 November 1992) was a German water polo player who competed in the 1928 Summer Olympics, the 1932 Summer Olympics, and the 1936 Summer Olympics.

At the Amsterdam Games he won the gold medal as member of the German team. He played all three matches and scored one goal.

In 1932, he was part of the German team which won the silver medal. He played all four matches.

Four years later he won his second silver medal with the German team. In Berlin he played six matches.

== See also ==
- Germany men's Olympic water polo team records and statistics
- List of Olympic champions in men's water polo
- List of Olympic medalists in water polo (men)
- List of members of the International Swimming Hall of Fame
