= Valentin Prokopov =

Soviet water polo player (1929-2016)

Personal information
- Born: 2 October 1929
- Died: 5 November 2016 (aged 87)

Sport
- Sport: Water polo
Medal record
Representing Soviet Union
Olympic Games
Bronze medal – third place	1956 Melbourne	Team competition

Valentin Prokopov (Russian: Валенти́н Ива́нович Проко́пов, 2 October 1929 – 5 November 2016) was a Russian water polo player who competed for the Soviet Union in the 1952 Summer Olympics and in the 1956 Summer Olympics. He became notorious for striking Hungarian player Ervin Zádor in the Blood in the Water match.

In 1952 he was part of the Soviet team which finished seventh in the Olympic water polo tournament. He played all nine matches and scored at least two goals (not all scorers are known). Four years later he won the bronze medal with the Soviet team in the 1956 tournament. He played six matches without scoring a goal.

== See also ==
- List of Olympic medalists in water polo (men)
