= Viktor Ageyev =

Soviet water polo player (1936–2023)

Personal information
- Born: 29 April 1936 Moscow, Soviet Union
- Died: 30 January 2023 (aged 86)

Sport
- Sport: Water polo
Medal record
Representing Soviet Union
Olympic Games
Silver medal – second place	1960 Rome	Team competition
Bronze medal – third place	1956 Melbourne	Team competition
Bronze medal – third place	1964 Tokyo	Team competition
European Championships
Silver medal – second place	1962 Leipzig	Team competition
Bronze medal – third place	1958 Budapest	Team competition

Viktor Ivanovich Ageev (Russian: Виктор Иванович Агеев, 29 April 1936 – 30 January 2023) was a Soviet water polo player who competed for the Soviet Union in the 1956 Summer Olympics, in the 1960 Summer Olympics, and in the 1964 Summer Olympics.

== Biography ==
Ageyev was born in Moscow on 29 April 1936. He died on 30 January 2023, at the age of 86.

== Career ==
In 1956 he was a member of the Soviet team which won the bronze medal. He played two matches.

Four years later he won the silver medal with the Soviet team in the water polo competition at the 1960 Games. He played two matches again.

At the 1964 Games he was part of the Soviet team which won again a bronze medal in the Olympic water polo tournament. He played all six matches and scored two goals.

== See also ==
- Soviet Union men's Olympic water polo team records and statistics
- List of Olympic medalists in water polo (men)
