= Ferenc Konrád =

Hungarian water polo player

Personal information
- Born: April 17, 1945 Budapest, Hungary
- Died: April 21, 2015 (aged 70) Budapest, Hungary

Sport
- Sport: Water polo
Medal record
Representing Hungary
Olympic Games
Gold medal – first place	1976 Montreal	Team competition
Silver medal – second place	1972 Munich	Team competition
Bronze medal – third place	1968 Mexico City	Team competition
World Championships
Gold medal – first place	1973 Belgrade	Team competition
Silver medal – second place	1975 Cali	Team competition
European Championships
Gold medal – first place	1974 Vienna	Team competition
Silver medal – second place	1970 Barcelona	Team competition
Summer Universiade
Gold medal – first place	1965 Budapest	Team competition

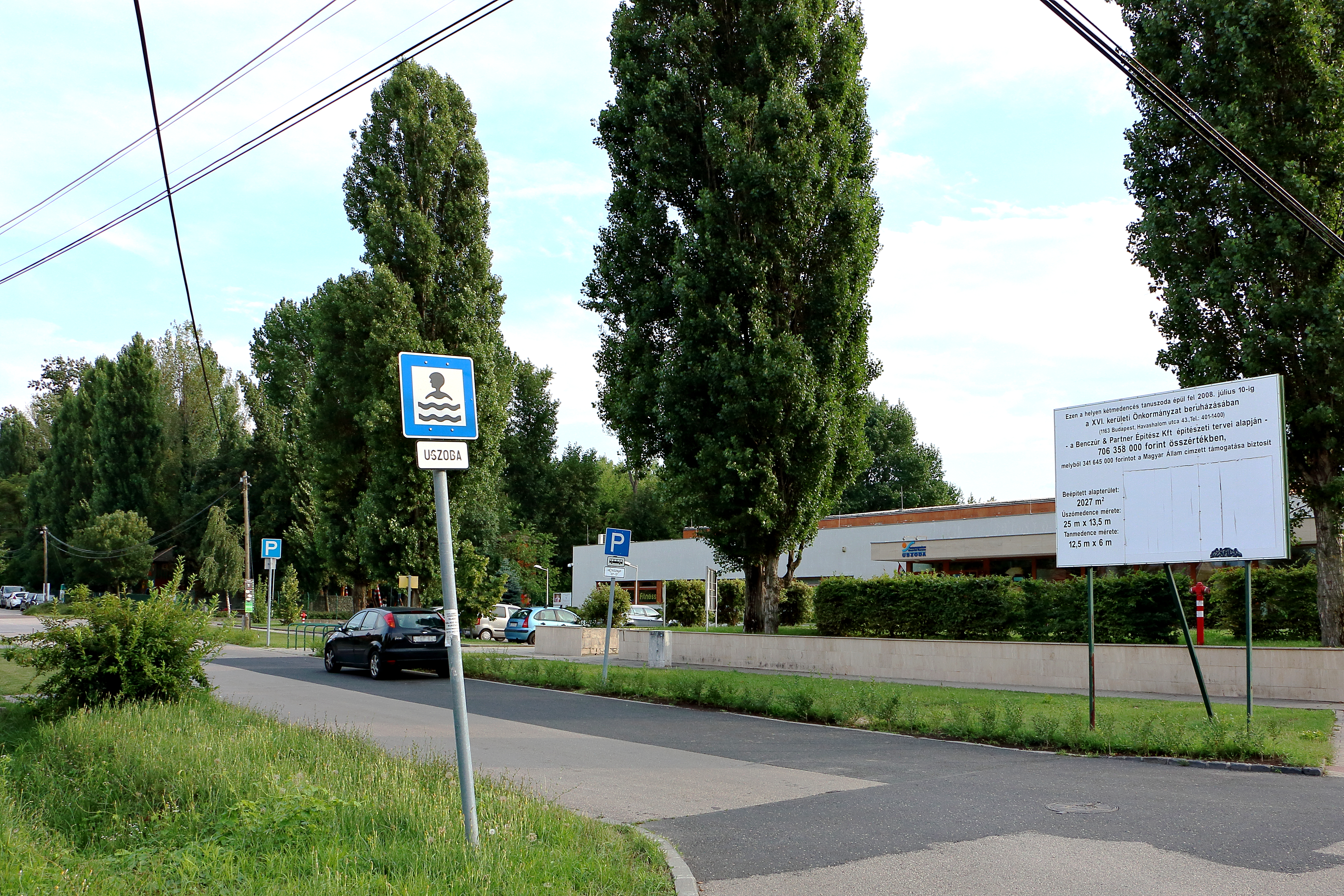

Ferenc Konrád (17 April 1945 – 21 April 2015) was a Hungarian water polo player who competed in the 1968 Summer Olympics, in the 1972 Summer Olympics, and in the 1976 Summer Olympics.

== See also ==
- Hungary men's Olympic water polo team records and statistics
- List of Olympic champions in men's water polo
- List of Olympic medalists in water polo (men)
- List of world champions in men's water polo
- List of World Aquatics Championships medalists in water polo
