= Aleksei Barkalov =

Soviet water polo player

Personal information
- Nationality: Ukrainian
- Born: 18 February 1946 Kharkiv, USSR
- Died: 9 September 2004 (aged 58) Kyiv, Ukraine
- Height: 1.80 m (5 ft 11 in)
- Weight: 82 kg (181 lb)

Sport
- Sport: Water polo
- Club: Dynamo Kharkiv, Dynamo Kyiv
Medal record
Men's Water polo
Representing the Soviet Union
Olympic Games
Gold medal – first place	1980 Moscow	Team competition
Gold medal – first place	1972 Munich	Team competition
Silver medal – second place	1968 Mexico	Team competition
World Championships
Gold medal – first place	1975 Cali	Team competition
Silver medal – second place	1973 Belgrade	Team competition
World Cup
Gold medal – first place	1981 Long Beach	Team competition
European Championships
Gold medal – first place	1970 Barcelona	Team competition
Silver medal – second place	1974 Vienna	Team competition

Aleksei Barkalov (Ukrainian: Олексій Степанович Баркалов, Russian: Алексей Степанович Баркалов; 18 February 1946 – 9 September 2004) was a Ukrainian water polo player who competed in the 1968, 1972, 1976 and 1980 Summer Olympics and won two gold and one silver medals for the Soviet Union team. During his career, he played 412 games for the national team, more than any other athlete in the water polo history. In 1993, he was inducted to the International Swimming Hall of Fame.

== Biography ==
Barkalov was born in the village of Vvedenka near Kharkiv and graduated from the Kharkiv Polytechnic Institute. Before choosing water polo, he played basketball for the Kharkiv city team, as well as football. Since 1957 he competed in water polo for Dynamo Kharkiv and in 1971 changed to Dynamo Kyiv. Since 1976 he acted both as a player and a coach for Dynamo Kyiv. After retirement in 1980 he became the head coach of the Junior Water Polo Team of Ukraine. Between 1990 and 1994 he worked in Yugoslavia, coaching the water polo club of Novi Sad. He then returned to Ukraine and from 1997 to 1999 acted as President of the Water Polo Federation of Ukraine. He received the following awards: Order of Friendship, Order For Merit to the Fatherland (3rd class) and Order of Merit (Ukraine).

Barkalov married Lyudmila Khazieva, a competitive swimmer who won a European bronze medal in 1966. Their only son, Dmitri, also competed in water polo but later pursued a career in business. Dmitri was killed in 2001 at the age of 32. This loss deeply affected Barkalov, and he died three years later due to a heart attack.

== See also ==
- Soviet Union men's Olympic water polo team records and statistics
- List of Olympic champions in men's water polo
- List of Olympic medalists in water polo (men)
- List of players who have appeared in multiple men's Olympic water polo tournaments
- List of men's Olympic water polo tournament top goalscorers
- List of world champions in men's water polo
- List of World Aquatics Championships medalists in water polo
- List of members of the International Swimming Hall of Fame
