= Endre Molnár =

Hungarian water polo player

Personal information
- Born: July 23, 1945 (age 80) Gheorgheni, Kingdom of Romania

Sport
- Sport: Water polo
Medal record
Olympic Games
Gold medal – first place	1976 Montreal	Team competition
Silver medal – second place	1972 Munich	Team competition
Bronze medal – third place	1968 Mexico City	Team competition
Bronze medal – third place	1980 Moscow	Team competition
World Championships
Gold medal – first place	1973 Belgrade	Team competition
Silver medal – second place	1975 Cali	Team competition
Silver medal – second place	1978 West Berlin	Team competition

Endre Molnár (born 23 July 1945) is a former Hungarian water polo player. He is one of eight male athletes who won four or more Olympic medals in water polo.

== See also ==
- Hungary men's Olympic water polo team records and statistics
- List of multiple Olympic medalists in one event
- List of Olympic champions in men's water polo
- List of Olympic medalists in water polo (men)
- List of players who have appeared in multiple men's Olympic water polo tournaments
- List of men's Olympic water polo tournament goalkeepers
- List of world champions in men's water polo
- List of World Aquatics Championships medalists in water polo
