= Aleksandr Dolgushin =

Russian water polo player

Personal information
- Born: 7 March 1946 Moscow, Russian SFSR, Soviet Union
- Died: 17 April 2006 (aged 60) Moscow, Russia
Medal record
Men's water polo
Representing the Soviet Union
Olympic Games
Gold medal – first place	1972 Munich	Team competition
Silver medal – second place	1968 Mexico City	Team competition
World Championships
Gold medal – first place	1975 Cali	Team competition
European Championships
Gold medal – first place	1966 Utrecht	Team competition
Gold medal – first place	1970 Barcelona	Team competition

Aleksandr Ivanovich Dolgushin (Russian: Александр Иванович Долгушин, 7 March 1946 – 17 April 2006) was a Russian water polo player who competed for the Soviet Union in the 1968 Summer Olympics and in the 1972 Summer Olympics.

== See also ==
- Soviet Union men's Olympic water polo team records and statistics
- List of Olympic champions in men's water polo
- List of Olympic medalists in water polo (men)
- List of world champions in men's water polo
- List of World Aquatics Championships medalists in water polo
- List of members of the International Swimming Hall of Fame
