= Vladimir Zhmudsky =

Sovet water polo player

Personal information
- Born: 23 January 1947 (age 79) Dublyany, Ukrainian SSR, Soviet Union

Sport
- Sport: Water polo
Medal record
Representing Soviet Union
Olympic Games
Gold medal – first place	1972 Munich	Team competition
World Championships
Silver medal – second place	1973 Belgrade	Team competition
European Championships
Gold medal – first place	1966 Utrecht	Team competition
Gold medal – first place	1970 Barcelona	Team competition

Vladimir Vladimirovich Zhmudsky (Russian: Владимир Владимирович Жмудский, born 23 January 1947) is a Ukrainian water polo player who competed for the Soviet Union in the 1972.

== See also ==
- Soviet Union men's Olympic water polo team records and statistics
- List of Olympic champions in men's water polo
- List of Olympic medalists in water polo (men)
- List of World Aquatics Championships medalists in water polo
