= Tivadar Kanizsa =

Hungarian water polo player

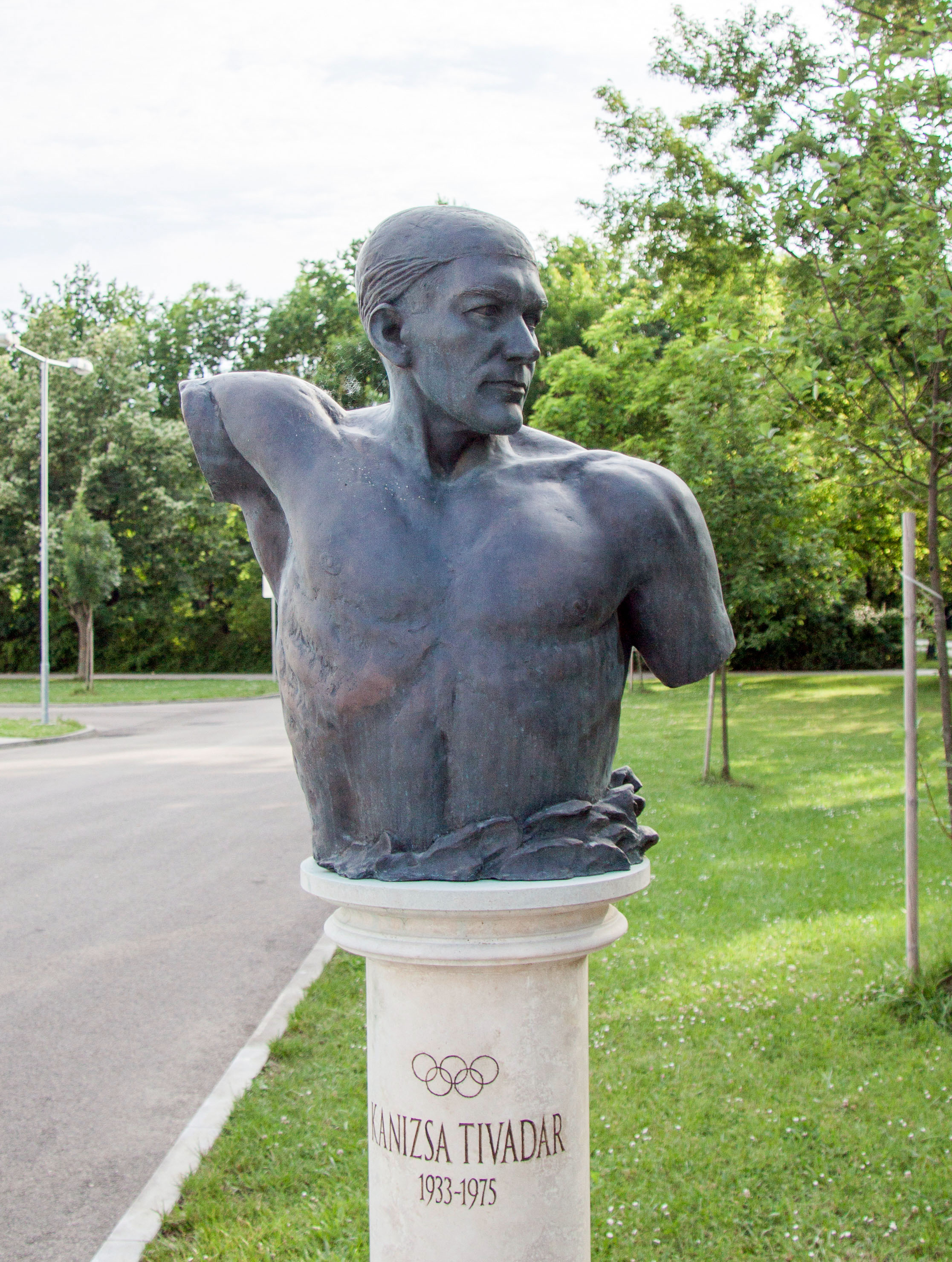

Personal information
- Born: 4 April 1933 Debrecen, Hungary
- Died: 4 November 1975 (aged 42) Jásztelek, Hungary
- Height: 180 cm (5 ft 11 in)
- Weight: 78 kg (172 lb)

Sport
- Sport: Water polo
- Club: Szolnoki Vízilabda SC
Medal record
Men's Water Polo
Representing Hungary
Olympic Games
Gold medal – first place	1956 Melbourne	Team competition
Bronze medal – third place	1960 Rome	Team competition
Gold medal – first place	1964 Tokyo	Team competition

Tivadar Kanizsa (4 April 1933 – 4 November 1975) was a Hungarian water polo player who competed in the 1956 Summer Olympics, in the 1960 Summer Olympics, and in the 1964 Summer Olympics.

He was born in Debrecen and died in Jásztelek.

Kanizsa was part of the Hungarian team which won the gold medal in the 1956 tournament. He played two matches.

Four years later he was a member of the Hungarian team which won the bronze medal in the 1960 Olympic tournament. He played six matches and scored six goals.

At the 1964 Games he won his second gold medal with the Hungarian team. He played five matches and scored one goal.

== See also ==
- Hungary men's Olympic water polo team records and statistics
- List of Olympic champions in men's water polo
- List of Olympic medalists in water polo (men)
- Blood in the Water match
