= Aleksandr Shidlovsky =

Russian water polo player

Personal information
- Born: 1 February 1941 (age 85) Moscow, USSR
Medal record
Men's Water Polo
Representing Soviet Union
Olympic Games
Gold medal – first place	1972 Munich	Team competition
Silver medal – second place	1968 Mexico City	Team competition

Aleksandr Georgiyevich Shidlovsky (Russian: Александр Георгиевич Шидловский, born 1 February 1941 in Moscow) is a Russian water polo player who competed for the Soviet Union in the 1968 Summer Olympics and in the 1972 Summer Olympics.

His son Alexandr Shidlovskiy, became also a water polo player and competed at the 2004 Summer Olympics.

== See also ==
- Soviet Union men's Olympic water polo team records and statistics
- List of Olympic champions in men's water polo
- List of Olympic medalists in water polo (men)
