= Aleksandr Dreval =

Russian water polo player

Personal information
- Born: 17 July 1944 (age 81) Moscow, USSR
Medal record
Men's Water Polo
Representing Soviet Union
Olympic Games
Gold medal – first place	1972 Munich	Team competition
World Championships
Gold medal – first place	1975 Cali	Team competition
Silver medal – second place	1973 Belgrade	Team competition
European Championships
Gold medal – first place	1970 Barcelona	Team competition

Aleksandr Konstantinovich Dreval (Russian: Александр Константинович Древаль, born 17 July 1944) is a Russian water polo player who competed for the Soviet Union in the 1972 and 1976 Summer Olympics.

== See also ==
- Soviet Union men's Olympic water polo team records and statistics
- List of Olympic champions in men's water polo
- List of Olympic medalists in water polo (men)
- List of world champions in men's water polo
- List of World Aquatics Championships medalists in water polo
