= Yury Shlyapin =

Soviet water polo player

Personal information
- Born: January 11, 1932 Moscow, Soviet Union
- Died: July 8, 2009 Moscow, Russia

Sport
- Sport: Water polo
Medal record
Representing Soviet Union
Olympic Games
Bronze medal – third place	1956 Melbourne	Team competition

Yury Aleksandrovich Shlyapin (Russian: Юрий Александрович Шляпин; January 11, 1932 – July 8, 2009) was a Russian water polo player who competed for the Soviet Union in the 1952 Summer Olympics and in the 1956 Summer Olympics.

In 1952 he was part of the Soviet team which finished seventh in the Olympic water polo tournament. He played five matches.

Four years later he won the bronze medal with the Soviet team in the 1956 tournament. He played all seven matches.

== See also ==
- List of Olympic medalists in water polo (men)
