= Hrvoje Kačić =

Croatian water polo player (1932–2023)

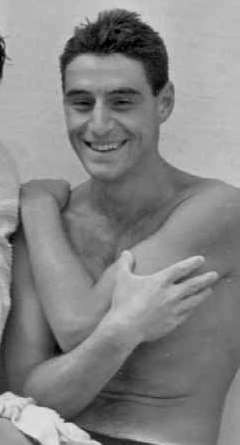
- Kačić in 1956

Personal information
- Born: January 13, 1932 Dubrovnik, Yugoslavia
- Died: February 14, 2023 (aged 91) Zagreb, Croatia

Sport
- Sport: Water polo
Medal record
Representing Yugoslavia
Olympic Games
Silver medal – second place	1956 Melbourne	Team competition
European Championship
Silver medal – second place	1958 Budapest	Team competition
Bronze medal – third place	1950 Vienna	Team competition
Mediterranean Games
Gold medal – first place	1959 Beirut	Team competition

Hrvoje Kačić (13 January 1932 – 14 February 2023) was a Croatian water polo player, legal scholar and politician.

== Biography ==
Kačić was born in Dubrovnik on 13 January 1932. At the age of 18, Kačić played for the Yugoslavia national water polo team at the 1950 European Water Polo Championship at which the team won bronze. During the 1950s he became out of favour with Yugoslavia's communist regime and had his passport confiscated on three occasions. He was jailed by the regime in 1952 which prevented him from joining the national team at the 1952 Summer Olympics. He was also expelled from university.

Kačić competed with the national team at the 1956 Summer Olympics, during which his friend and teammate Ivo Štakula defected to Australia. In 1957, he was awarded the Sportske novosti Croatian Sportsman of the Year. At the 1959 Mediterranean Games he won a gold medal. On the club level he was a long-time member of Croatian waterpolo club Jug from Dubrovnik, multiple national champion.

In 1956 he finished a degree in law. He later finished a doctorate in law in 1965 at the University of Zagreb, specializing in maritime law. Kačić also wrote about history. He has collaborated with Ivo Pilar Institute of History.

Kačić was elected to the Croatian Parliament for the first time in the country's first democratic elections in 1990 as an independent candidate. From 1994 to 2001 he was president of the State Commission for Borders of the Republic of Croatia.

In 1994 he received the Croatian Olympic Committee's Matija Ljubek Award. He has served on the committee which gives out the Franjo Bučar State Award for Sport. Kačić still actively supported Croatian water polo, retaining a position in the Croatian Water Polo Federation and supporting the national team.

Kačić died in Zagreb, Croatia, on 14 February 2023, at the age of 91.

== See also ==
- List of Olympic medalists in water polo (men)
