= Water polo at the 1956 Summer Olympics =

Water polo at the Games of the XVI Olympiad
- Venues: Swimming and Diving Stadium
- Date: 28 November – 7 December 1956
- Competitors: 96 from 10 nations

Medalists
1st place, gold medalist(s)		Hungary
2nd place, silver medalist(s)		Yugoslavia
3rd place, bronze medalist(s)		Soviet Union

Ten nations competed in water polo at the 1956 Summer Olympics in Melbourne.

== Medallists ==
Gold	Silver	Bronze
Hungary Antal Bolvári; Ottó Boros; Dezső Gyarmati; István Hevesi; László Jeney; Tivadar Kanizsa; György Kárpáti; Kálmán Markovits; Miklos Martin; Mihály Mayer; István Szivós; Ervin Zádor	Yugoslavia Ivo Cipci; Tomislav Franjković; Vladimir Ivković; Zdravko Ježić; Hrvoje Kačić; Zdravko-Ćiro Kovačić; Lovro Radonjić; Marijan Žužej	Soviet Union Viktor Ageev; Pyotr Breus; Boris Goykhman; Nodar Gvakhariya; Vyacheslav Kurennoy; Boris Markarov; P'et're Mshveniyeradze; Valentin Prokopov; Mikhail Ryzhak; Yury Shlyapin

== Participating nations ==
For the team rosters see: Water polo at the 1956 Summer Olympics – Men's team squads.

- Australia (9)
- United Team of Germany (11)
- Great Britain (9)
- Hungary (12)
- Italy (11)
- Romania (9)
- Singapore (10)
- Soviet Union (11)
- United States (11)
- Yugoslavia (11)

== Results ==
=== Preliminary round ===
The preliminary round consisted of a round-robin tournament held in three groups. Each team played the other teams in its group once.

==== Group A ====
Nation	Pld.	Win	Loss	Tie	GF	GA	Points
Yugoslavia	3	3	0	0	15	5	6
Soviet Union	3	2	1	0	9	6	4
Romania	3	1	2	0	9	9	2
Australia	3	0	3	0	3	16	0

28 November

- 14:00 - Romania def. Australia, 4-2
- 19:30 - Yugoslavia def. Soviet Union, 3-2

29 November

- 21:15 - Soviet Union def. Romania, 4-3
- 22:15 - Yugoslavia def. Australia, 9-1

30 November

- 10:30 - Yugoslavia def. Romania, 3-2
- 16:00 - Soviet Union def. Australia, 3-0

==== Group B ====
Nation	Pld.	Win	Loss	Tie	GF	GA	Points
Hungary	2	2	0	0	12	3	4
United States	2	1	1	0	7	9	2
Great Britain	2	0	2	0	4	11	0

28 November

- 20:30 - United States def. Great Britain, 5-3

29 November

- 15:45 - Hungary def. Great Britain, 6-1

30 November

- 11:30 - Hungary def. United States, 6-2

==== Group C ====
Nation	Pld.	Win	Loss	Tie	GF	GA	Points
Italy	2	2	0	0	11	3	4
Germany	2	1	1	0	7	5	2
Singapore	2	0	2	0	2	12	0

28 November

- 15:00 - Germany def. Singapore, 5-1

29 November

- 16:45 - Italy def. Singapore, 7-1

30 November

- 22:10 - Italy def. Germany, 4-2

=== Final round ===
The top two teams in each preliminary group advanced to the championship, in which they played each of the four other championship teams they had not previously faced. The results of the preliminary round game against the team from their group carried over into the final round.

The teams that did not advance to the championship played in a consolation tournament.

External images
- Ervin Zádor leaving the pool with a cut eye (National Library of Australia).
- First-aid officer escorting Ervin Zádor to the medical room for treatment of his cut eye (National Library of Australia).
- Ervin Zádor in the medical room, receiving treatment, protected by a police officer (National Library of Australia)
- Ervin Zádor’s cut eye (Public Record Office Victoria)
- Ervin Zádor’s cut eye (Public Record Office Victoria)
- Spectators invading the concourse (Public Record Office Victoria)
- Spectators invading the concourse (Public Record Office Victoria)
- Spectators invading the concourse (Public Record Office Victoria)
- Spectators invading the concourse (Public Record Office Victoria)

==== Championship ====
The most famous water polo match in history was the semi-finals round match between Hungary and the Soviet Union. As the athletes left for the games, the Hungarian Revolution started and was crushed by the Soviet army. Many of the Hungarian athletes vowed never to return home and felt their only means of fighting back was in the pool.

With only two games left for each team, the Hungarians were leading in the standings, 1 point ahead of Yugoslavia and 2 ahead of the Soviets. A Soviet victory would have put them alongside the Hungarians in the standings, with the final match pairings favoring the Soviets, who would face the last-place Germans while Hungary had to compete with Yugoslavia. A Hungarian victory would ensure at least a silver medal for the team, with a draw or a win against Yugoslavia in the last game meaning gold.

The Hungary-Soviet Union confrontation was extremely bloody and violent, riddled with penalties, and the pool was later depicted as turning red from the blood spilt. The Hungarians led the Soviets 4-0 before the game was called off in the final minute to prevent angry spectators, many of them Hungarian immigrants to Australia, reacting to Valentin Prokopov punching Ervin Zádor's eye open. The Hungarians went on to win the gold medal by defeating Yugoslavia 2-1 in the final. Half of the Hungarian Olympic delegation defected after the Games.

Rank	Nation	Pld.	Win	Loss	Tie	GF	GA	Points
1	Hungary	5	5	0	0	20	3	10
2	Yugoslavia	5	3	1	1	13	8	7
3	Soviet Union	5	3	2	0	14	14	6
4	Italy	5	2	3	0	10	13	4
5	United States	5	1	4	0	10	20	2
6	United Team of Germany	5	0	4	1	11	20	1

1 December

- 14:40 - Soviet Union def. Italy, 3-2
- 22:40 - Yugoslavia def. United States, 5-1

3 December

- 16:50 - United States def. Germany, 4-3
- 21:30 - Hungary def. Italy, 4-0

4 December

- 15:40 - Yugoslavia tied Germany, 2-2
- 21:00 - Italy def. United States, 3-2

5 December

- 16:40 - Soviet Union def. United States, 3-1
- 22:20 - Hungary def. Germany, 4-0

6 December

- 15:25 - Hungary def. Soviet Union, 4-0
- 21:55 - Yugoslavia def. Italy, 2-1

7 December

- 14:00 - Soviet Union def. Germany, 6-4
- 21:20 - Hungary def. Yugoslavia, 2-1

==== Consolation ====
Rank	Nation	Pld.	Win	Loss	Tie	GF	GA	Points
7	Great Britain	3	3	0	0	21	9	6
8	Romania	3	2	1	0	21	8	4
9	Australia	3	1	2	0	7	11	2
10	Singapore	3	0	3	0	8	29	0

- Great Britain def. Singapore, 11-5
- Great Britain def. Australia, 5-2
- Romania def. Singapore, 15-1
- Great Britain def. Romania, 5-2
- Australia def. Singapore, 3-2
- Romania def. Australia, 4-2

== See also ==
- Blood in the Water match

== Sources ==
- PDF documents in the LA84 Foundation Digital Library:
  - Official Report of the 1956 Olympic Games (download, archive) (pp. 592–594, 624–627)
- Water polo on the Olympedia website
  - Water polo at the 1956 Summer Olympics (men's tournament)
- Water polo on the Sports Reference website
  - Water polo at the 1956 Summer Games (men's tournament) (archived)
