= Vladimir Ivković =

Croatian water polo player (1929–1992)

Personal information
- Born: 25 July 1929 Dubrovnik, Kingdom of Yugoslavia
- Died: 10 March 1992 (aged 62) Zagreb, Croatia

Sport
- Sport: Water polo
Medal record
Representing Yugoslavia
Olympic Games
Silver medal – second place	1952 Helsinki	Team competition
Silver medal – second place	1956 Melbourne	Team competition

Vladimir Ivković (25 July 1929 – 10 March 1992) was a Croat water polo player who competed for Yugoslavia in the 1952 Summer Olympics and in the 1956 Summer Olympics. He was born in Dubrovnik. Ivković was part of the Yugoslav team which won the silver medal in the 1952 tournament. He played two matches. Four years later he won again the silver medal with the Yugoslav team in the 1956 tournament, and again he played two matches.

== See also ==
- List of Olympic medalists in water polo (men)
