= Zdravko Ježić =

Croatian water polo player

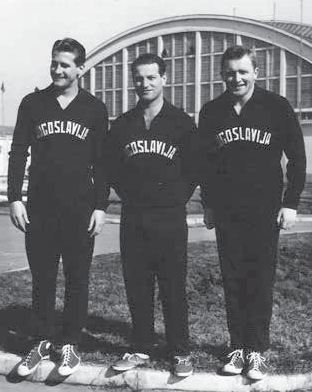
- Ježić (right) in 1956

Personal information
- Born: 17 August 1931 Niš, Serbia
- Died: 19 June 2005 (aged 73) New York City, United States
- Height: 182 cm (6 ft 0 in)
- Weight: 91 kg (201 lb)

Sport
- Sport: Water polo
- Club: HAVK Mladost
Medal record
Representing Yugoslavia
Olympic Games
Silver medal – second place	1952 Helsinki	Team competition
Silver medal – second place	1956 Melbourne	Team competition

Zdravko "Pusko" Ježić (17 August 1931 – 19 June 2005) was a Croatian chemist and water polo player. He was part of the Yugoslav team that won silver medals at the 1952 and 1956 Olympics and placed fourth in 1960.

In 1958 Ježić received a degree in chemical technology from the University of Zagreb, and in 1960, he started working for chemical industry. In 1962, he defended a PhD in organic chemical technology, and then spent a few years as a postdoctoral student at the University of Michigan. From 1966 until his retirement in 1992 he developed polymeric materials at Dow Chemical Company in the United States. He co-authored numerous scientific and technical papers and 13 patents. As a U.S. citizen, Ježić appeared in an Olympic-themed commercial for Dow Chemical during the 1988 Olympics.

Ježić died in New York City in 2005. In 2010, he was inducted into the International Swimming Hall of Fame.

== See also ==
- List of Olympic medalists in water polo (men)
- List of members of the International Swimming Hall of Fame
