= Tomislav Franjković =

Croatian water polo player

Personal information
- Born: 19 May 1931 Korčula, Yugoslavia
- Died: 11 October 2010 (aged 79) Korčula, Croatia

Sport
- Sport: Water polo
Medal record
Representing Yugoslavia
Olympic Games
| Silver medal – second place | 1956 Melbourne | Team competition |

Tomislav Franjković (Томислав Фрањковић, 19 May 1931 – 11 October 2010) was a Croat water polo player who competed for Yugoslavia in the 1956 Summer Olympics.

He was part of the Yugoslav team which won the silver medal in the 1956 tournament. He played six matches.

== See also ==
- List of Olympic medalists in water polo (men)
