= Lovro Radonić =

Croatian water polo player (1928–1990)

Personal information
- Born: February 25, 1928 Korčula, Yugoslavia
- Died: July 31, 1990 (aged 62) Rijeka, Yugoslavia

Sport
- Sport: Swimming, water polo
Medal record
Men's water polo
Representing Yugoslavia
Olympic Games
Silver medal – second place	1952 Helsinki	Team competition
Silver medal – second place	1956 Melbourne	Team competition

Lovro Radonić (February 25, 1928 – July 31, 1990) was a Croatian water polo player and butterfly swimmer who competed for Yugoslavia in the 1952, 1956, and 1960 Summer Olympics. He was born in Korčula, Kingdom of Serbs, Croats and Slovenes. Radonić was part of the Yugoslav team which won the silver medal in the 1952 tournament. He played all nine matches. Four years later he won again the silver medal with the Yugoslav team in the 1956 tournament. He played six matches. In 1960 he participated in the 200 metre butterfly competition but was eliminated in the first round. He was born in Korčula and died in Rijeka.

His son is a noted VK Primorje player and manager Damir Radonić.

== See also ==
- List of Olympic medalists in water polo (men)
