= List of Summer Olympics venues: D–E =

For the Summer Olympics, there were a total of 21 venues starting with the letter 'D' and 20 venues that start with the letter 'E'.

== D ==
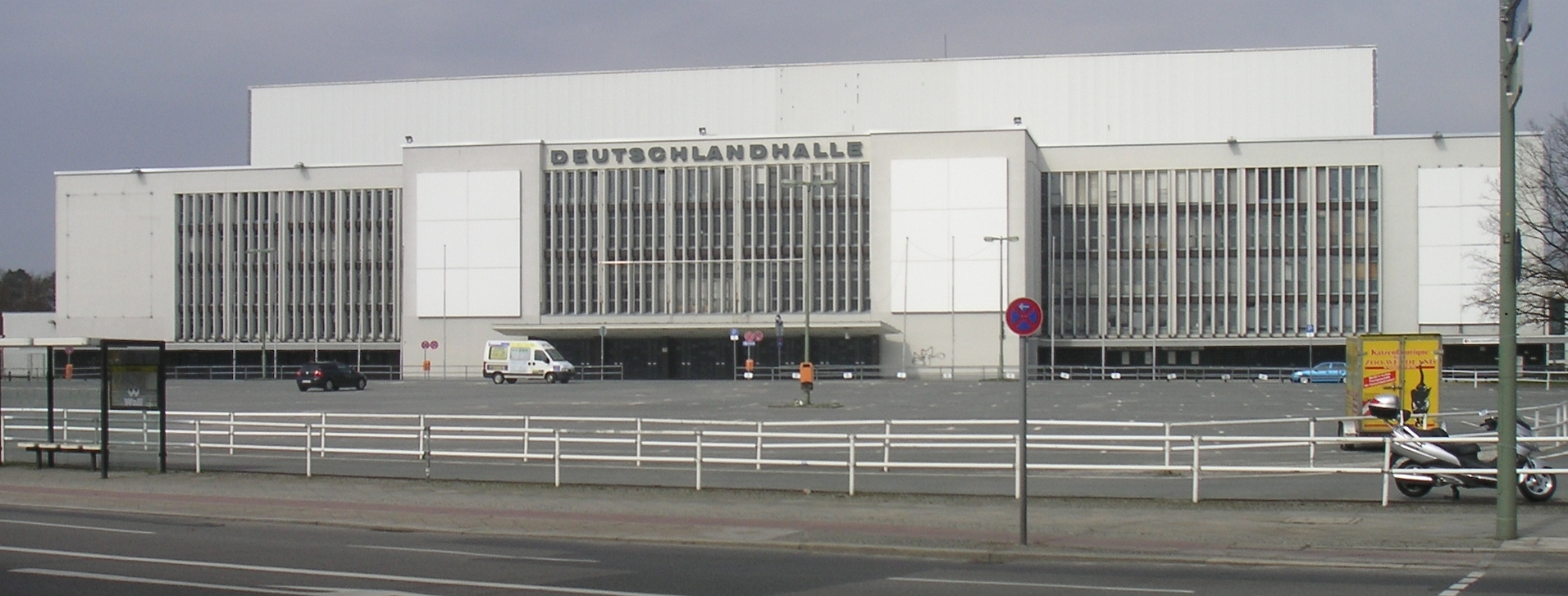
For the 1936 Summer Olympics in Berlin, Deutschlandhalle hosted the boxing, weightlifintg, and wrestling events.

Venue	Games	Sports	Capacity	Ref.
Daegu Stadium	1988 Seoul	Football	23,278	
Daejeon Stadium	1988 Seoul	Football	30,000	
Dantebad	1972 Munich	Water polo	3,200	
Deodoro Arena	2016 Rio de Janeiro	Fencing	5,000	
Deodoro Modern Pentathlon Park	2016 Rio de Janeiro	Modern pentathlon	20,000	
Deutschlandhalle	1936 Berlin	Boxing, Weightlifting, Wrestling	8,630	
Dietrich Eckart Open-Air Theatre	1936 Berlin	Gymnastics	20,000	
Djurgårdsbrunnsviken	1912 Stockholm	Diving, Modern pentathlon (swimming), Rowing, Swimming, Water polo	Not listed.	
Döberitz	1936 Berlin	Equestrian (eventing), Modern pentathlon (riding)	Not listed.	
Donauhalle Ulm	1972 Munich	Handball	2,300	
Dongdaemun Stadium	1988 Seoul	Football	26,383	
Dorney Lake	2012 London	Canoeing (sprint), Rowing	30,000 maximum	
Drei Flüsse Stadion	1972 Munich	Football	20,000	
Dressage Facility Nymphenburg	1972 Munich	Equestrian (dressage)	8,000	
Dunc Gray Velodrome	2000 Sydney	Cycling (track)	3,150	
Dynama Stadium	1980 Moscow	Football	41,040	
Dynamo Central Stadium, Grand Arena	1980 Moscow	Football	36,540	
Dynamo Central Stadium, Minor Arena	1980 Moscow	Field hockey	5,000	
Dynamo Palace of Sports	1980 Moscow	Handball	5,000	
Dynamo Shooting Range	1980 Moscow	Modern pentathlon (shooting), Shooting	2,330	
Druzhba Multipurpose Arena	1980 Moscow	Volleyball	3,900	

== E ==
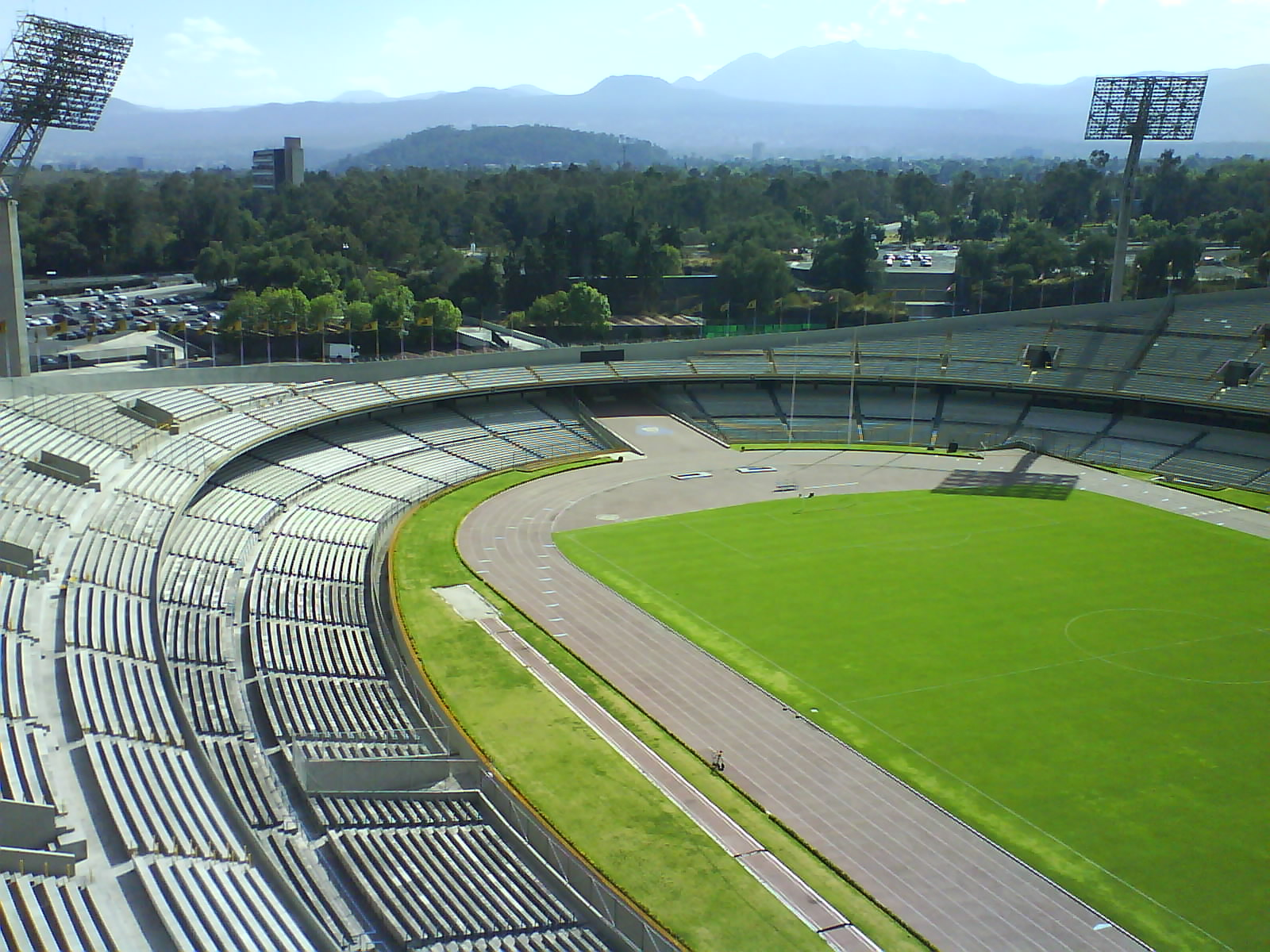
Estadio Olímpico Universitario hosted athletics, equestrian team jumping, and the ceremonies for the 1968 Summer Olympics in Mexico City.

Venue	Games	Sports	Capacity	Ref.
Eagle's Nest Arena	1984 Los Angeles	Judo	4,200	
Earls Court Exhibition Centre	2012 London	Volleyball (indoor)	15,000	
Eiskanal	1972 Munich	Canoeing (slalom)	25,000	
El Dorado Park	1984 Los Angeles	Archery	4,000	
Empire Pool	1948 London	Boxing, Diving, Swimming, Water polo (final)	12,500	
Empire Stadium	1948 London	Athletics, Equestrian (jumping), Field hockey (medal matches), Football (medal matches)	82,000	
Empress Hall, Earl's Court	1948 London	Boxing, Gymnastics, Gymnastics, Weightlifting, Wrestling	19,000	
Enoshima	1964 Tokyo	Sailing	Not listed.	
Estació Nord Sports Hall	1992 Barcelona	Table tennis	5,500	
Estadi de la Nova Creu Alta	1992 Barcelona	Football	16,000	
Estadi del FC Barcelona	1992 Barcelona	Football (final)	100,000	
Estadi Olímpic de Monjuïc	1992 Barcelona	Athletics, Ceremonies (opening/closing)	60,000	
Estadi Olímpic de Terrassa	1992 Barcelona	Field hockey	10,200	
Estadio Azteca	1968 Mexico City	Football (final)	104,000	
Estadio Cuauhtémoc	1968 Mexico City	Football	42,648	
Estadio Luís Casanova	1992 Barcelona	Football	50,000	
Estadio Nou Camp	1968 Mexico City	Football	33,943	
Estadio Olímpico Universitario	1968 Mexico City	Athletics (includes 20 km and 50 km walks), Ceremonies (opening/ closing), Equestrian (jumping team)	63,186	
ESV-Stadion	1972 Munich	Football	11,418	
ExCeL	2012 London	Boxing, Fencing, Judo, Table tennis, Taekwondo, Weightlifting, Wrestling	Not listed.	
