= Nossek =

Nossek is a surname. Notable people with the surname include:

- Carola Nossek (born 1949), German operatic soprano and voice teacher
- H. J. Nossek (1893–1965), American collegiate basketball and football coach
- Heiko Nossek (born 1982), German Olympic water polo player
- Ingulf Nossek (1944–1999), German Olympic water polo player
- Joe Nossek (1940–2026), American professional baseball player, coach, and scout
- Ralph Nossek (1923–2011), British actor
