= Venues of the 1972 Summer Olympics =

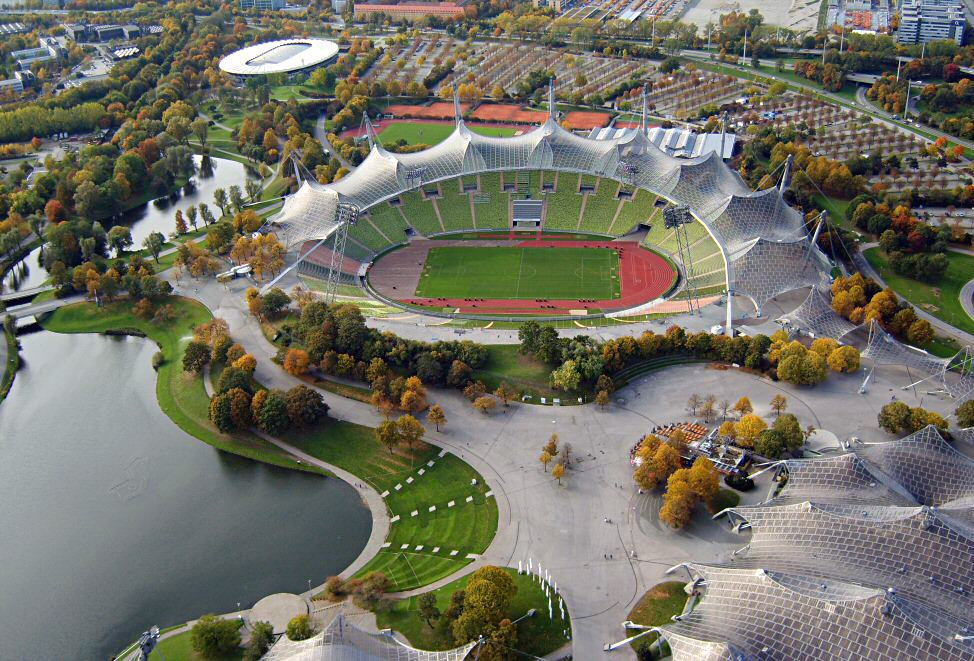
Munich's Olympiastadion.

For the 1972 Summer Olympics, a total of thirty-two sports venues were used. A majority of the venues used were new construction in time for the 1972 Games after Munich was awarded the Games in 1966. Kiel Bay was the only venue from the 1936 Summer Olympics to be used for the 1972 Games. A stretch of the Autobahn near Munich was used for cycling's road team time trial event. After the Olympics, Olympiastadion hosted the final of the FIFA World Cup less than two years later. Augsburg's Eiskanal has served as host to three Canoe Slalom World Championships while the shooting range hosted the World Shooting Championships in 2010. Olympiapark was part of Munich's unsuccessful bid for the 2018 Winter Olympics.

== Venues ==
=== Olympiapark ===
Venue	Sports	Capacity	Ref.
Boxhalle	Boxing, Judo (final)	7,360	
Hockeyanlage	Field hockey	21,900	
Olympiahalle	Gymnastics, Handball (final)	10.563	
Olympiastadion	Athletics, Ceremonies (opening/ closing), Equestrian (jumping team), Football (final), Modern pentathlon (running)	77,000	
Olympisches Dorf	Competitor housing	Not listed.	
Radstadion	Cycling (track)	4,157	
Schwimmhalle	Diving, Modern pentathlon (swimming), Swimming, Water polo (final)	9,182	
Volleyballhalle	Volleyball	3,680	

=== Greater Munich ===
Venue	Sports	Capacity	Ref.
Basketballhalle	Basketball, Judo	6,635	
Bogenschießanlage	Archery	1,100	
Dantebad	Water polo	3,200	
Dressage Facility Nymphenburg	Equestrian (dressage)	8,000	
Grünwald	Cycling (individual road race)	Not listed.	
Messegelände, Fechthalle 1	Fencing (final)	978	
Messegelände Fechthalle 2	Fencing, Modern pentathlon (fencing)	978	
Messegelände, Gewichtheberhalle	Weightlifting	3,297	
Messegelände, Judo- und Ringerhalle	Judo, Wrestling	5,750	
Regattastrecke Oberschleißheim	Canoeing (sprint), Rowing	41,000	
Riding Facility, Riem	Equestrian (jumping individual, eventing cross-country), Modern pentathlon (riding)	23,000	
Schießanlage	Modern pentathlon (shooting), Shooting	4,500	

=== Football venues ===
Venue	Capacity	Ref.
Drei Flüsse Stadion (Passau)	20,000	
ESV-Stadion (Ingolstadt)	11,418	
Jahnstadion (Regensburg)	11,200	
Rosenaustadion (Augsburg)	28,000	
Municipal Stadium (Nuremberg)	45,548	

=== Handball venues ===
Venue	Capacity	Ref.
Sporthalle (Böblingen)	Not listed	
Donauhalle (Ulm)	2,300	
Hohenstaufenhalle (Göppingen)	5,599	
Sporthalle (Augsburg)	3,093	

=== Other venues ===
Venue	Sports	Capacity	Ref.
Bay of Kiel	Sailing	4,000 on 14 steam ships	
Bundesautobahn 96	Cycling (road team time trial)	Not listed.	
Eiskanal (Augsburg)	Canoeing (slalom)	25,000	

== Before the Olympics ==
At the 1936 Summer Olympics in Berlin, Kiel served as host of the sailing events. Munich hosted the World Weightlifting Championships in 1955. Augsburg hosted the ICF Canoe Slalom World Championships in 1957 though that course was a natural whitewater course rather than artificial. Jahnstadion was built in 1926 while Urban Stadium was constructed in 1928. Ingolstadt's stadium was constructed in 1932 while Rosenaustadion was completed in 1951. The handball venues in Böblingen and Augsburg were completed in the mid-1960s.

The German Autobahn was first built in the 1930s and expanded in the 1950s following World War II. The A96 route was constructed in the 1960s and expanded in 1970 in time for the 1972 Summer Olympics.

When Munich was selected as host for the 1972 Summer Games in April 1966, an aggressive construction program began. Fifteen different sites for the canoe sprint and rowing events were reviewed before Oberschleißheim was selected in April 1969. Temporary venues were set at Englischer Garten and Nymphenburg Palace.

== During the Olympics ==
At Eiskanal, East Germany won all four canoe slalom events. This was helped because they studied the course in Augsburg the year before and constructed an exact replica of the course in Zwickau.

For the road team time trial cycling event, a 25 km (16 mi) stretch of the A96 was used with the start-finish point south of Munich near the Fürsten-ried section. The teams crossed over to the other side of the autobahn over a specially constructed turn before proceeding back to the start-finish line.

== After the Olympics ==
Olympiastadion in Munich would be one of nine stadiums to host the FIFA World Cup which took place in 1974, including the final match which host nation West Germany defeated the Netherlands. The Eiskanal in Augsburg hosted the Canoe Slalom World Championships in 1985 and 2003. Schießanlage served as venue host for the ISSF World Shooting Championships in 2010.

Munich was a finalist for the 2018 Winter Olympics. Curling, figure skating, ice hockey, short track speed skating, and speed skating event are planned to take place at Olympiapark. It will work with Garmisch-Partenkirchen, host of the 1936 Winter Olympics who will do all of the snow events, and Schönau am Königssee, whose sliding track plan on doing all of the bobsleigh, luge, and skeleton events as venues for the 2018 Winter Games. In July 2011 Munich lost out to Pyeongcheong.
