= List of Olympic venues in water polo =

For the Summer Olympics, there are 34 venues that have been or will be used for water polo. Debuting in 1900, the first venues took place similar to that of the swimming events. By the 1908 Games, the first water polo venue not located on a river or a lake took place. It was not until the 1920 Games that a separate venue was created for the aquatic venues. 1948 was the first Olympics in water polo took place both indoor and in more than one venue. The first separate water polo venue that was not connected to other aquatic venues was at the 1964 Summer Olympics in Tokyo.

Games	Venue	Other sports hosted at venue for those games	Capacity	Ref.
1900 Paris	Seine	Rowing, Swimming	Not listed.	
1904 St. Louis	Forest Park	Diving, Swimming	Not listed.	
1908 London	White City Stadium	Archery, Athletics, Cycling (track), Diving, Field hockey, Football, Gymnastics, Lacrosse, Rugby union, Swimming, Tug of war, Wrestling	97,000.	
1912 Stockholm	Djurgårdsbrunnsviken	Diving, Modern pentathlon (swimming), Rowing, Swimming	Not listed.	
1920 Antwerp	Stade Nautique d'Antwerp	Diving, Swimming	Not listed.	
1924 Paris	Piscine des Tourelles	Diving, Modern pentathlon (swimming), Swimming	8,023	
1928 Amsterdam	Olympic Sports Park Swim Stadium	Diving, Modern pentathlon (swimming), Swimming	4,440	
1932 Los Angeles	Swimming Stadium	Diving, Modern pentathlon (swimming), Swimming	10000	
1936 Berlin	Olympic Swimming Stadium	Diving, Modern pentathlon (swimming), Swimming	20,000 during 1936 Games.	
1948 London	Empire Pool (final)	Boxing, Diving, Swimming	12,500	
1948 London	Finchley Lido	None	Not listed.	
1952 Helsinki	Swimming Stadium	Diving, Swimming	12,500	
1956 Melbourne	Swimming/Diving Stadium	Diving, Modern pentathlon (swimming), Swimming	6,000	
1960 Rome	Piscina delle Rose	None	1,850	
1960 Rome	Stadio Olimpico del Nuoto (final)	Diving, Modern pentathlon (swimming), Swimming	20,000	
1964 Tokyo	Tokyo Metropolitan Indoor Swimming Pool	None	3,000	
1968 Mexico City	Francisco Márquez Olympic Pool (final)	Diving, Modern pentathlon (swimming), Swimming	15,000	
1968 Mexico City	University City Swimming Pool	None	4,993	
1972 Munich	Dantebad	None	3,200	
1972 Munich	Schwimmhalle (final)	Diving, Modern pentathlon (swimming), Swimming	9,182	
1976 Montreal	Complexe sportif Claude-Robillard	Handball	2,755 (Water polo); 4,721 (Handball)	
1976 Montreal	Olympic Pool (final)	Diving, Modern pentathlon (swimming), Swimming	10,000	
1980 Moscow	Swimming Pool - Moscow	None	10,500	
1980 Moscow	Swimming Pool - Olimpiysky (final)	Diving, Modern pentathlon (swimming), Swimming	13,000	
1984 Los Angeles	Raleigh Runnels Memorial Pool	None	5,000	
1988 Seoul	Jamsil Indoor Swimming Pool	Diving, Modern pentathlon (swimming), Swimming, Synchronized swimming	8,000	
1992 Barcelona	Piscina Municipal de Montjuïc	Diving	6,500	
1992 Barcelona	Piscines Bernat Picornell (final)	Modern pentathlon (swimming), Swimming, Synchronized swimming	10,000	
1996 Atlanta	Georgia Tech Aquatic Center	Diving, Modern pentathlon (swimming), Swimming, Synchronized swimming	15,000	
2000 Sydney	Ryde Aquatic Leisure Centre (women's matches)	None	3,900	
2000 Sydney	Sydney International Aquatic Centre (women's final and men's final)	Diving, Modern pentathlon (swimming), Swimming, Synchronized swimming	10,000 (17.000 during 2000 Games)	
2004 Athens	Athens Olympic Aquatic Centre	Diving, Swimming, Synchronized swimming	11,500 (larger pool)	
2008 Beijing	Ying Tung Natatorium	Modern pentathlon (swimming)	4,852	
2012 London	Water Polo Arena	None	5,000	
2016 Rio de Janeiro	Maria Lenk Aquatics Centre	Diving, Synchronized swimming	6,500	
2016 Rio de Janeiro	Olympic Aquatics Stadium (finals)	Swimming, Synchronized swimming	18,000	
2020 Tokyo	Tokyo Tatsumi International Swimming Center	None	5,000	
2024 Paris	Paris La Défense Arena (finals)	Swimming	15,220	
2024 Paris	Paris Aquatic Centre	Diving, Synchronized swimming	5,000	
2028 Los Angeles	Long Beach Convention Center Lot	Synchronized swimming	Not listed.	
2032 Brisbane	Brisbane Live (finals)	Swimming	17,000	
2032 Brisbane	Brisbane Aquatics Centre	Diving, Synchronized swimming	4,300	

== Gallery of venues ==
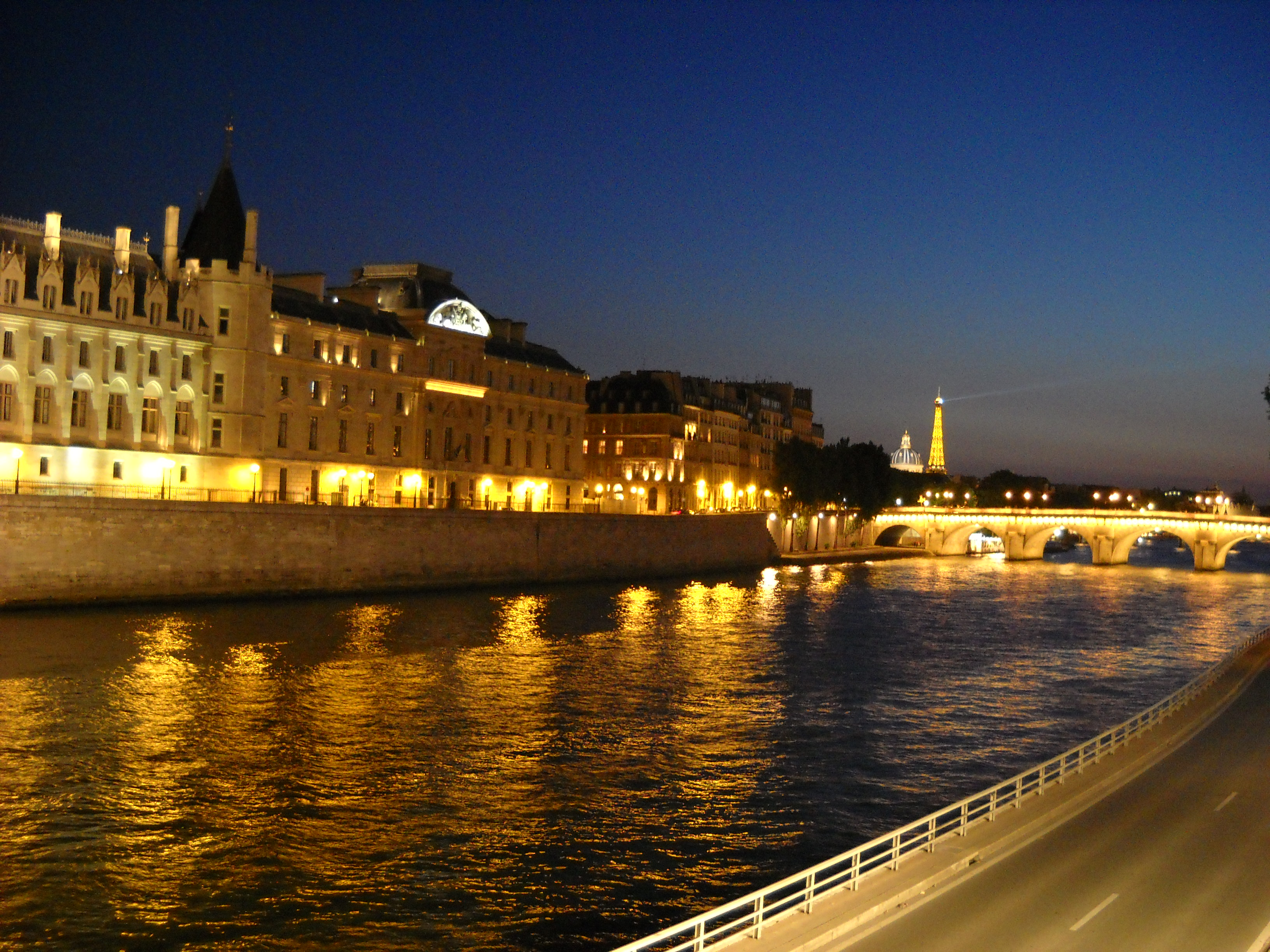
The Seine hosted the first water polo competitions at the 1900 Summer Olympics in Paris.

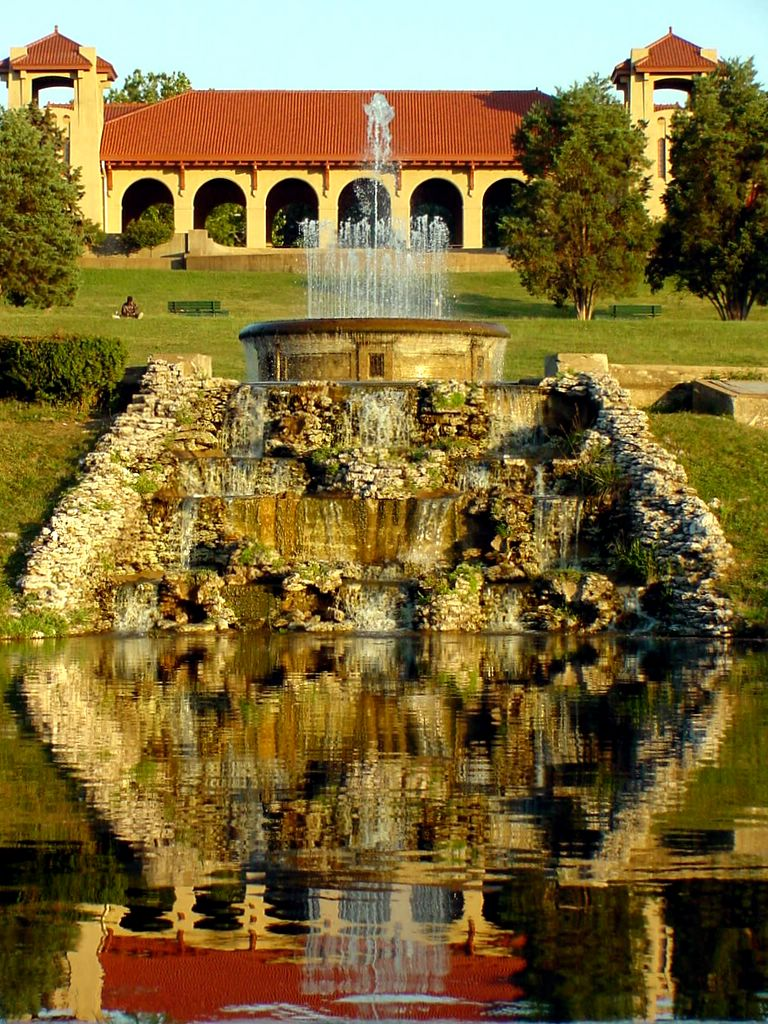
Forest Park hosted water polo at the 1904 Summer Olympics in St. Louis.

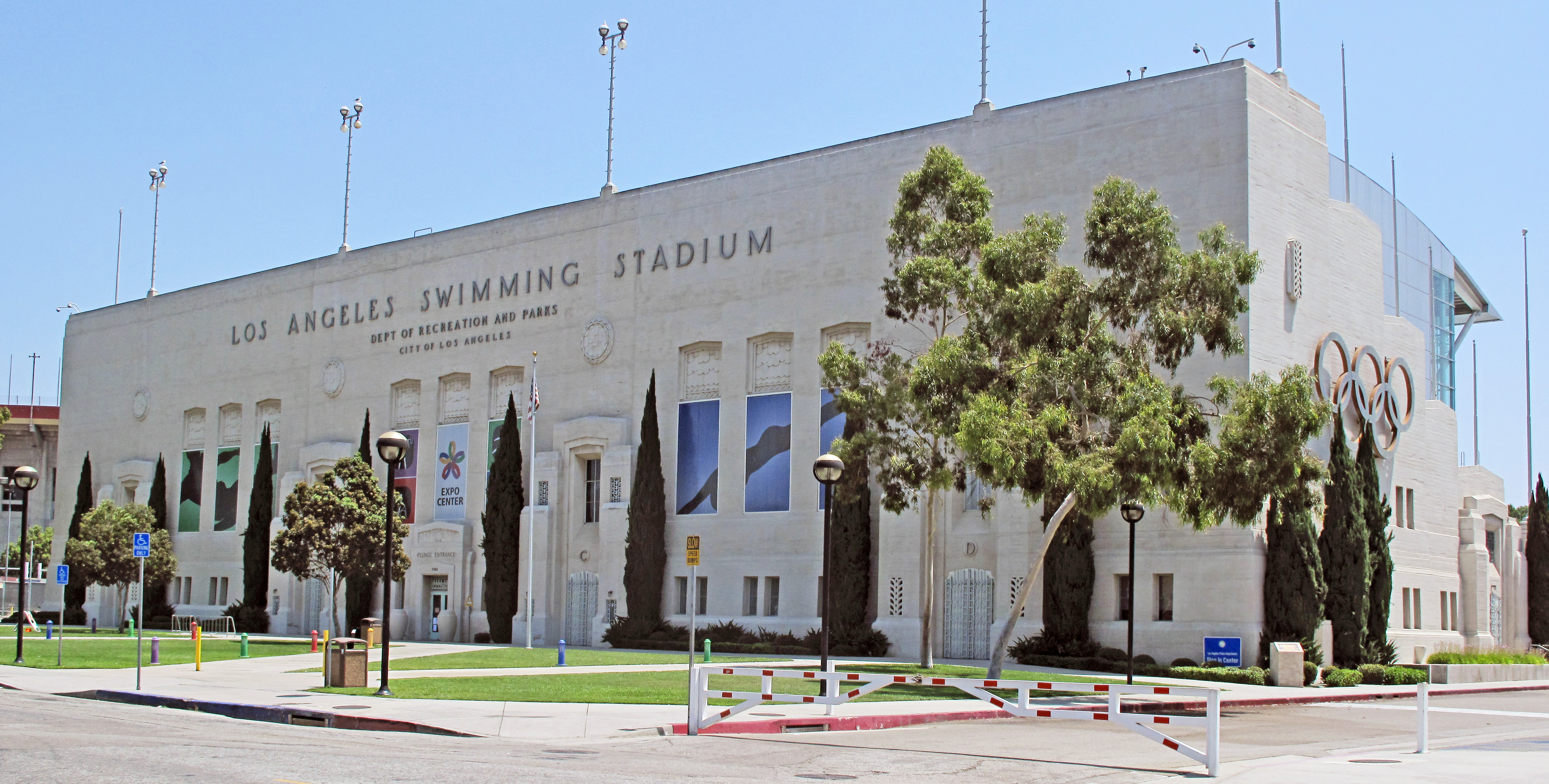
LA84 Foundation/John C. Argue Swim Stadium hosted water polo at the 1932 Summer Olympics in Los Angeles.

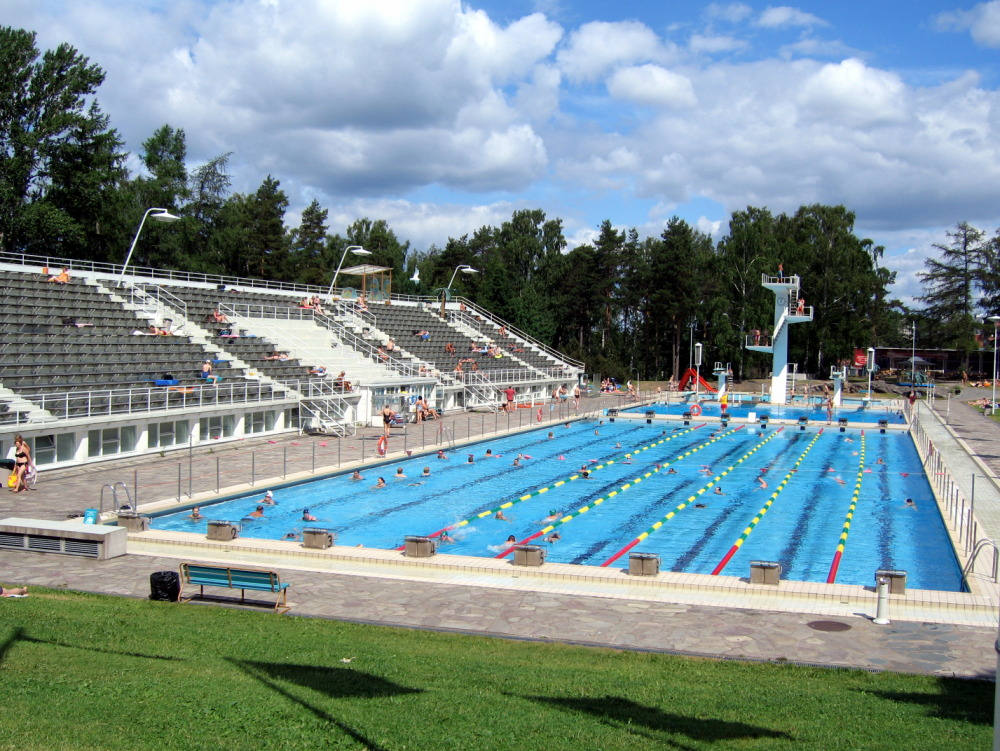
The Swimming Stadium hosted water polo at the 1952 Summer Olympics in Helsinki.

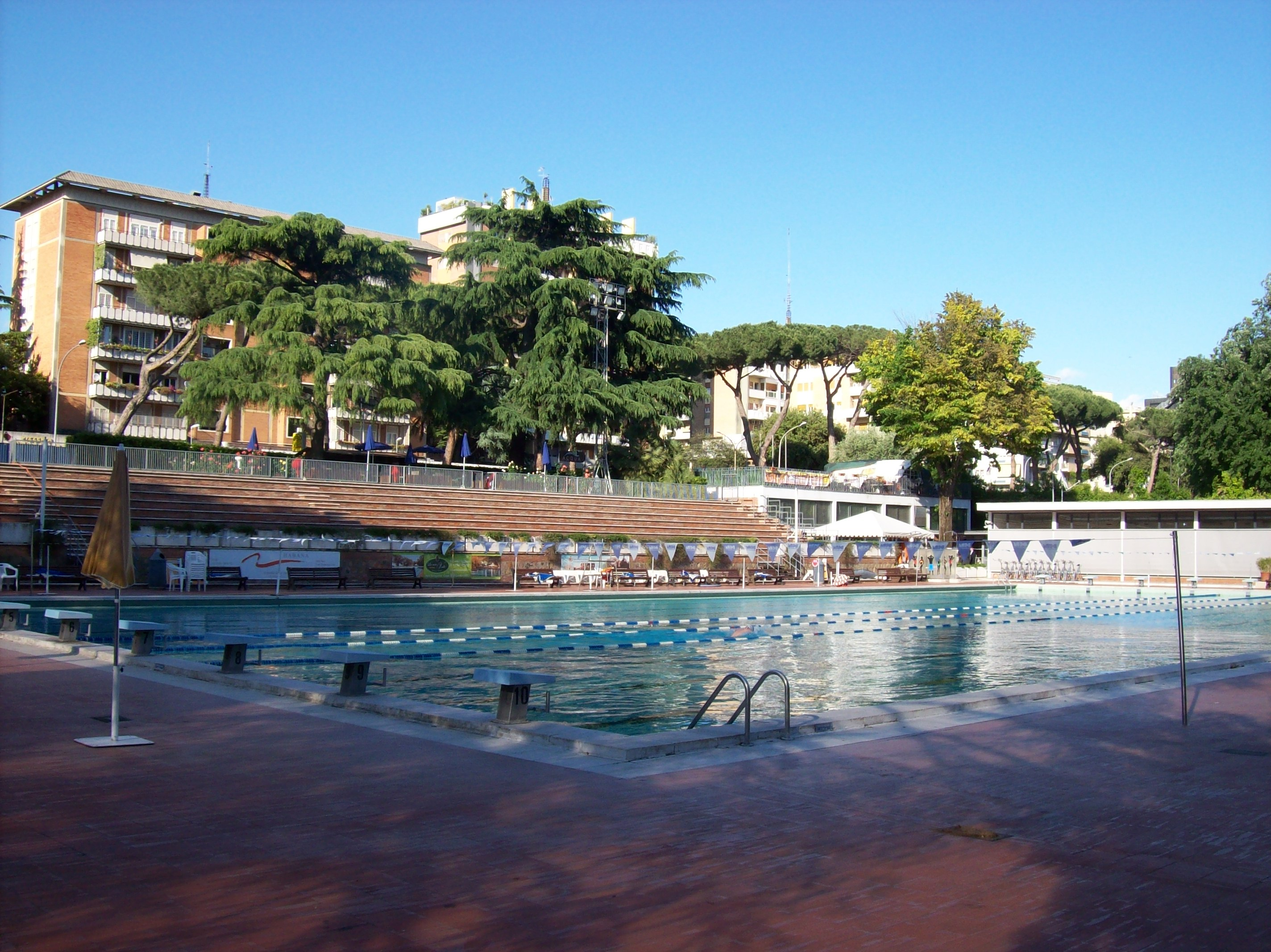
Piscina delle Rose hosted water polo at the 1960 Summer Olympics in Rome.

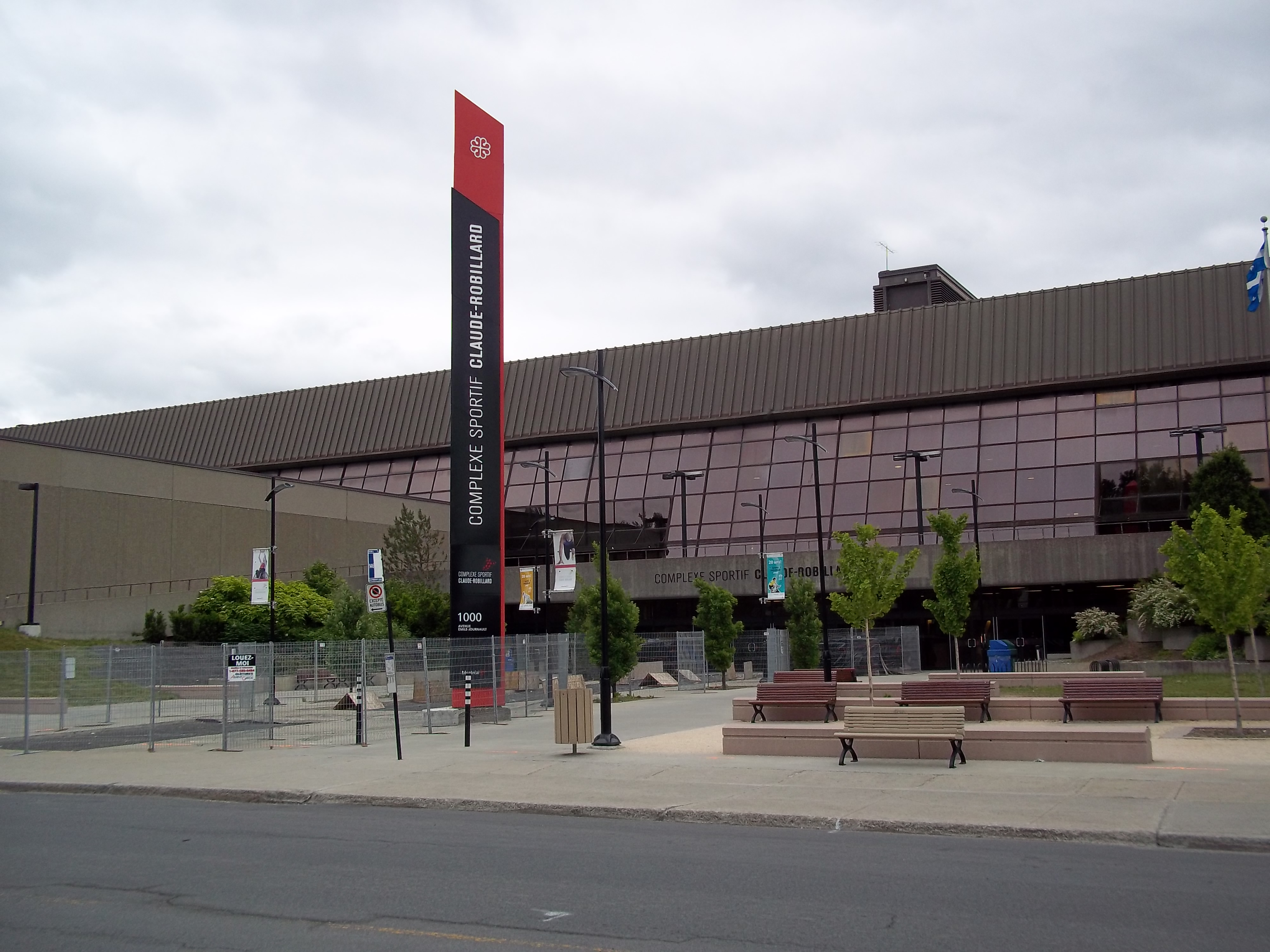
Complexe sportif Claude-Robillard hosted water polo at the 1976 Summer Olympics in Montreal.

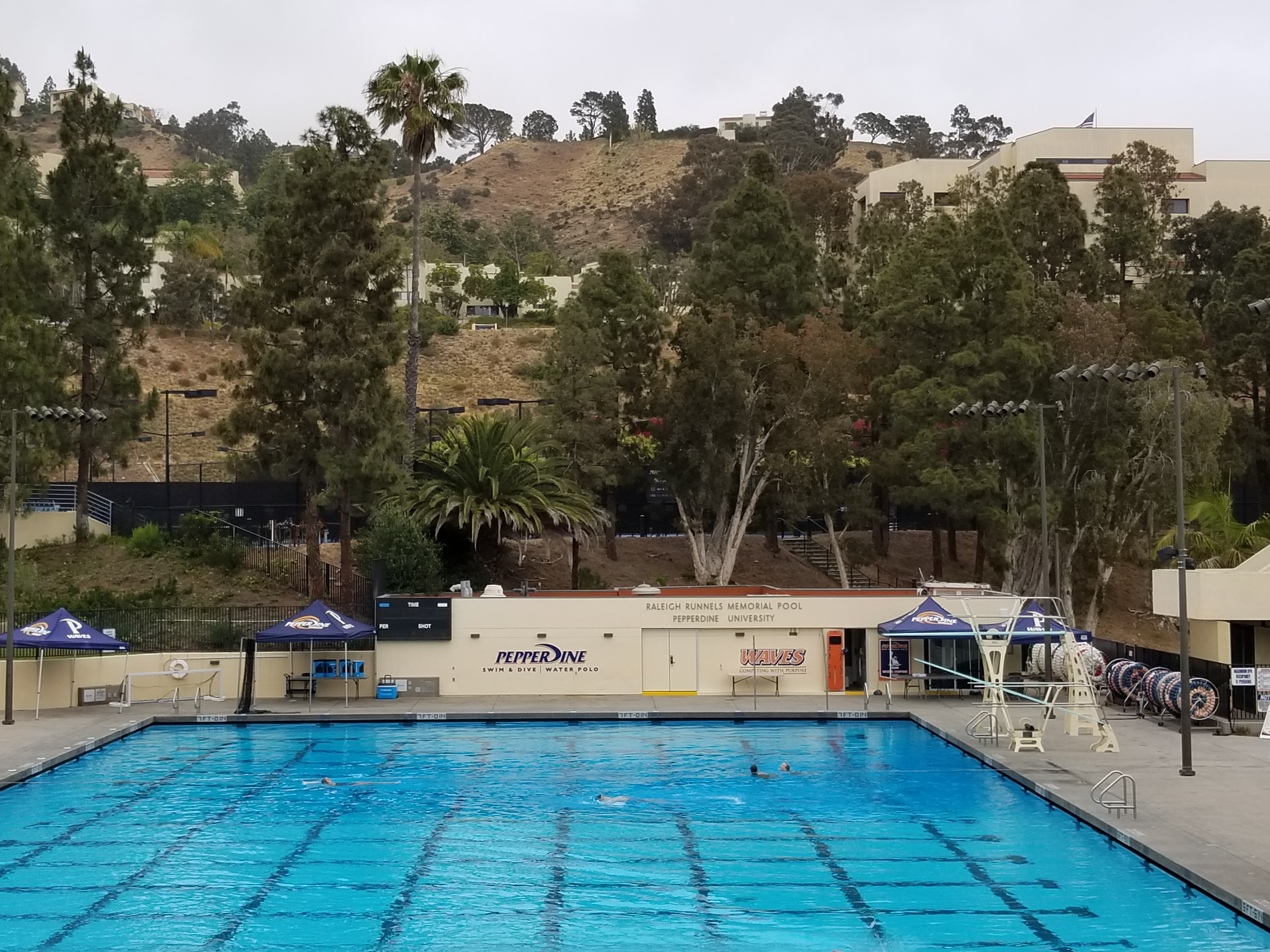
Raleigh Runnels Memorial Pool hosted water polo at the 1984 Summer Olympics in Los Angeles.

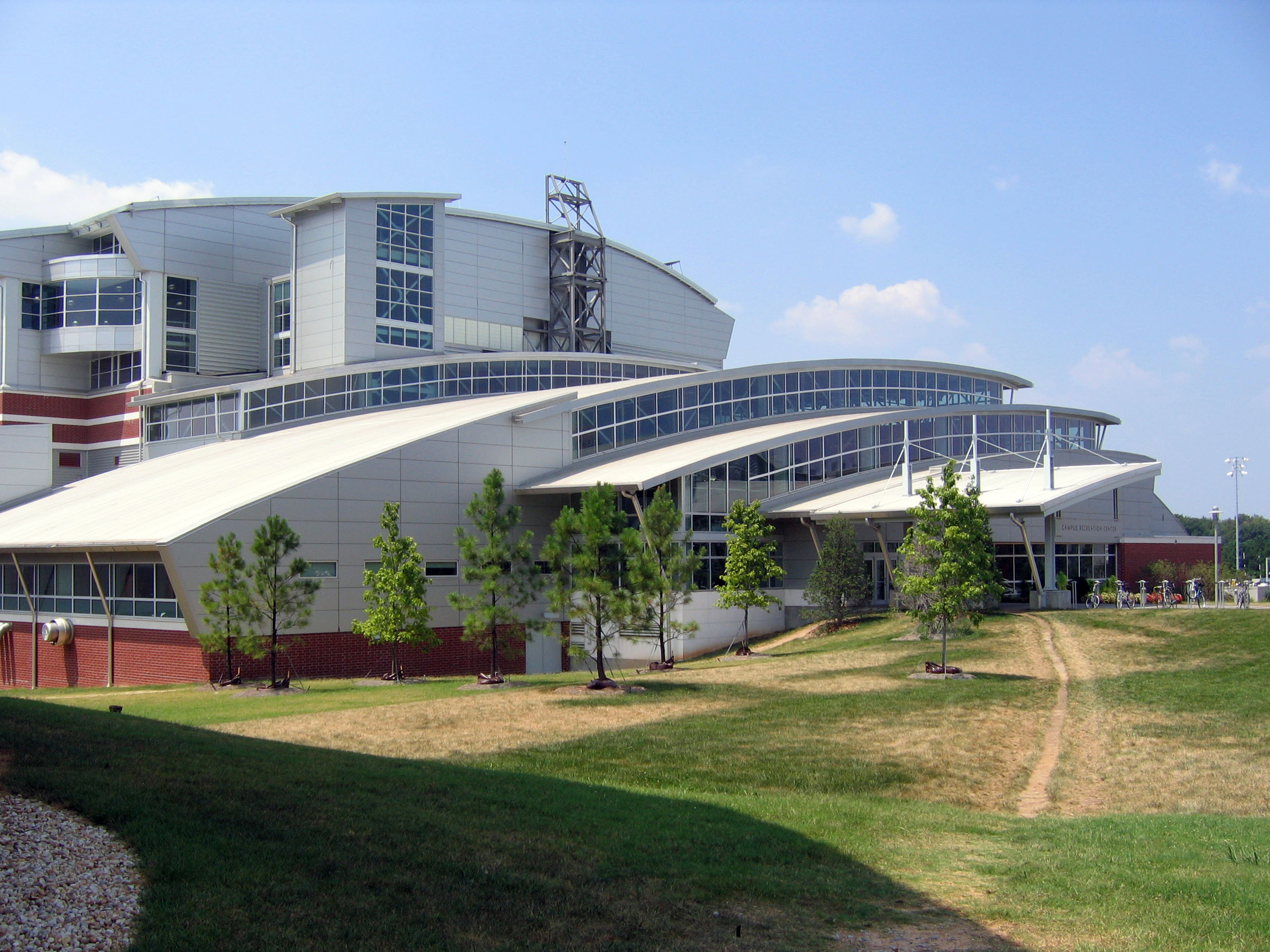
Georgia Tech Aquatic Center hosted water polo at the 1996 Summer Olympics were in Atlanta.

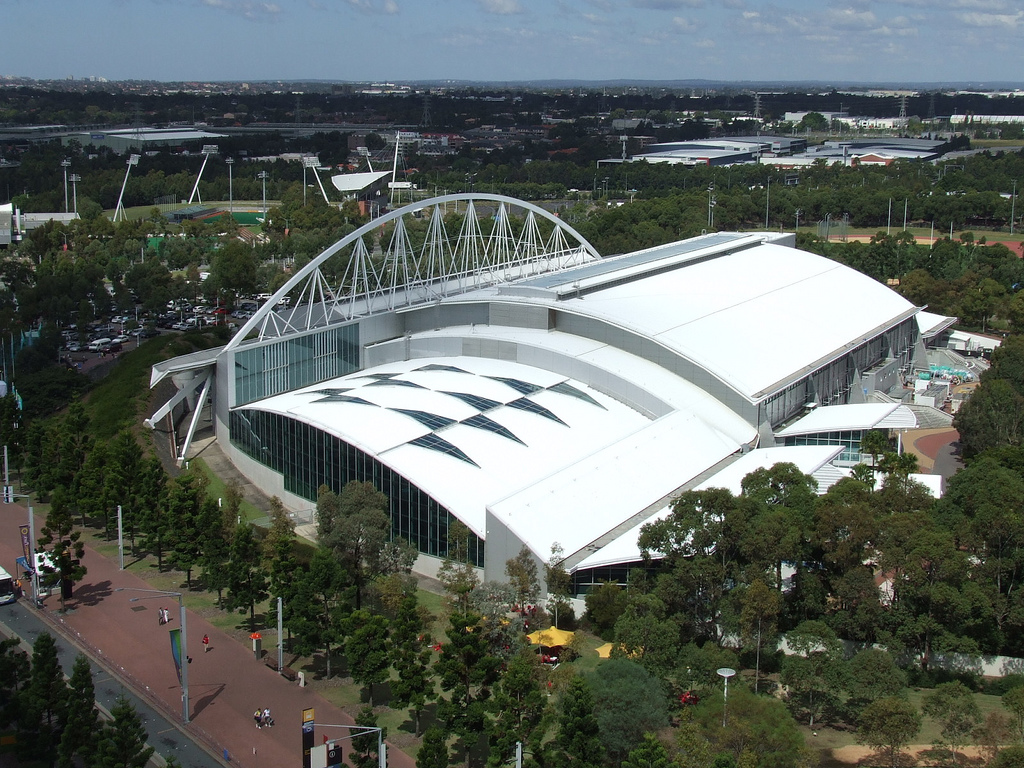
The Sydney Olympic Park Aquatics Centre hosted water polo at the 2000 Summer Olympics.

Athens Olympic Aquatic Centre hosted water polo at the 2004 Summer Olympics.

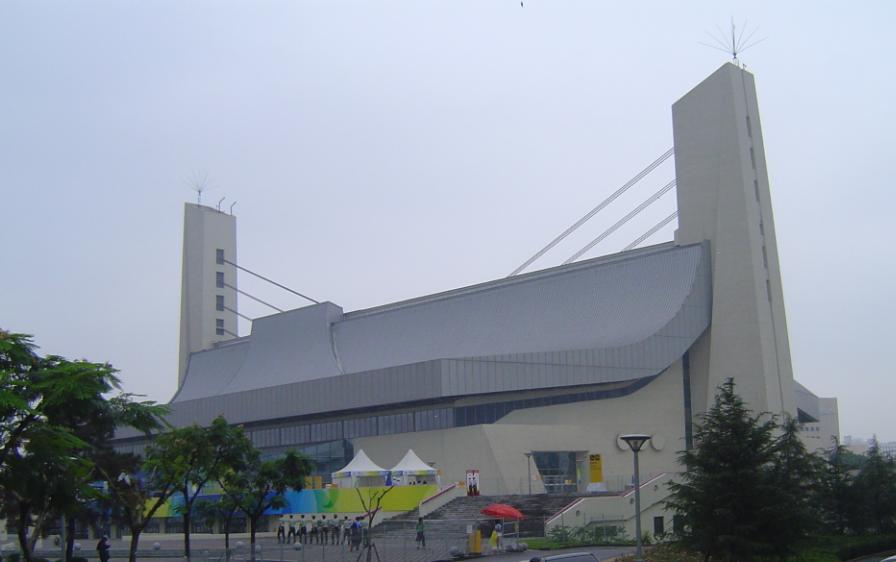
Ying Tung Natatorium hosted water polo at the 2008 Summer Olympics in Beijing.

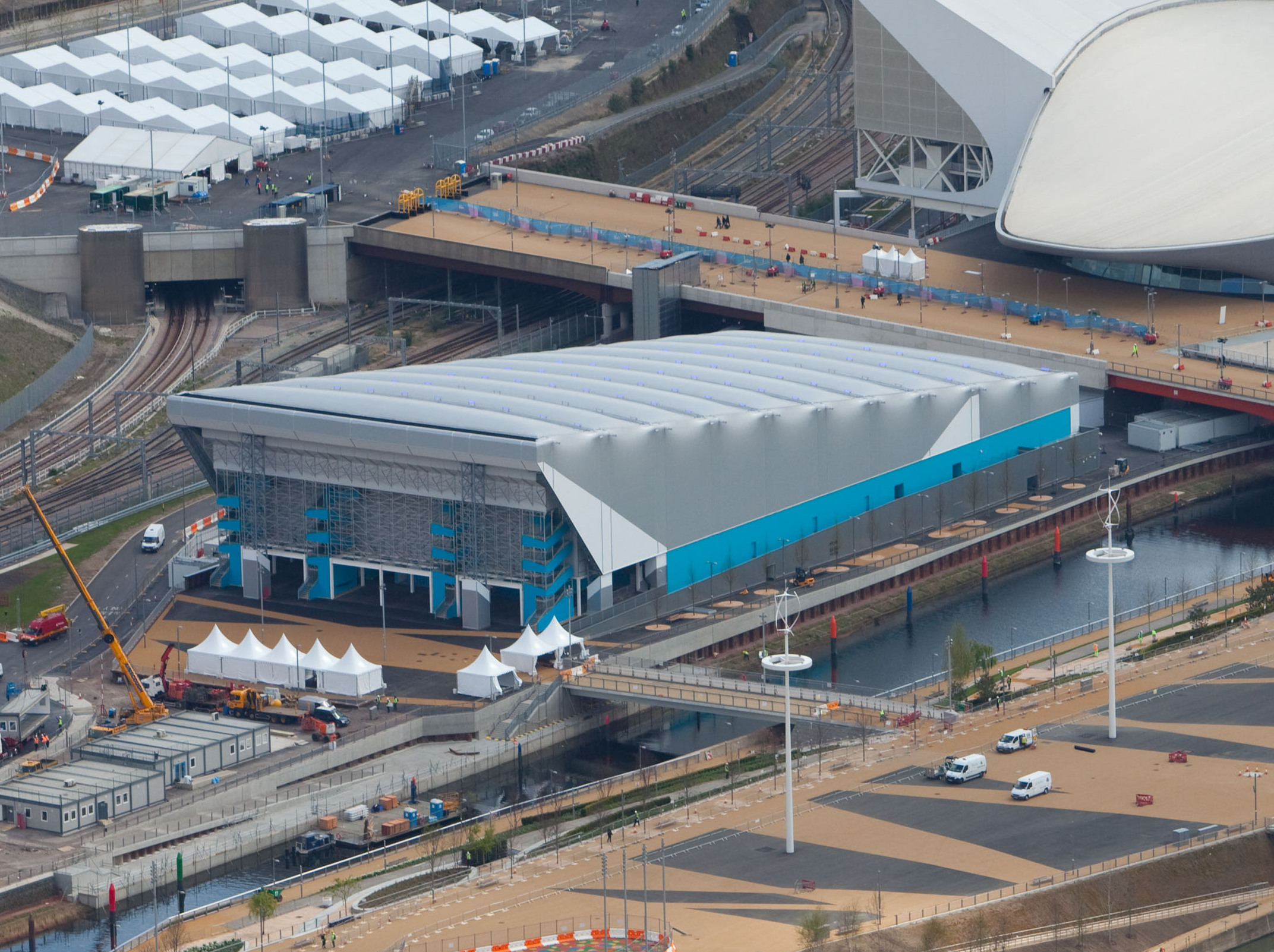
The Water Polo Arena hosted water polo at the 2012 Summer Olympics in London.

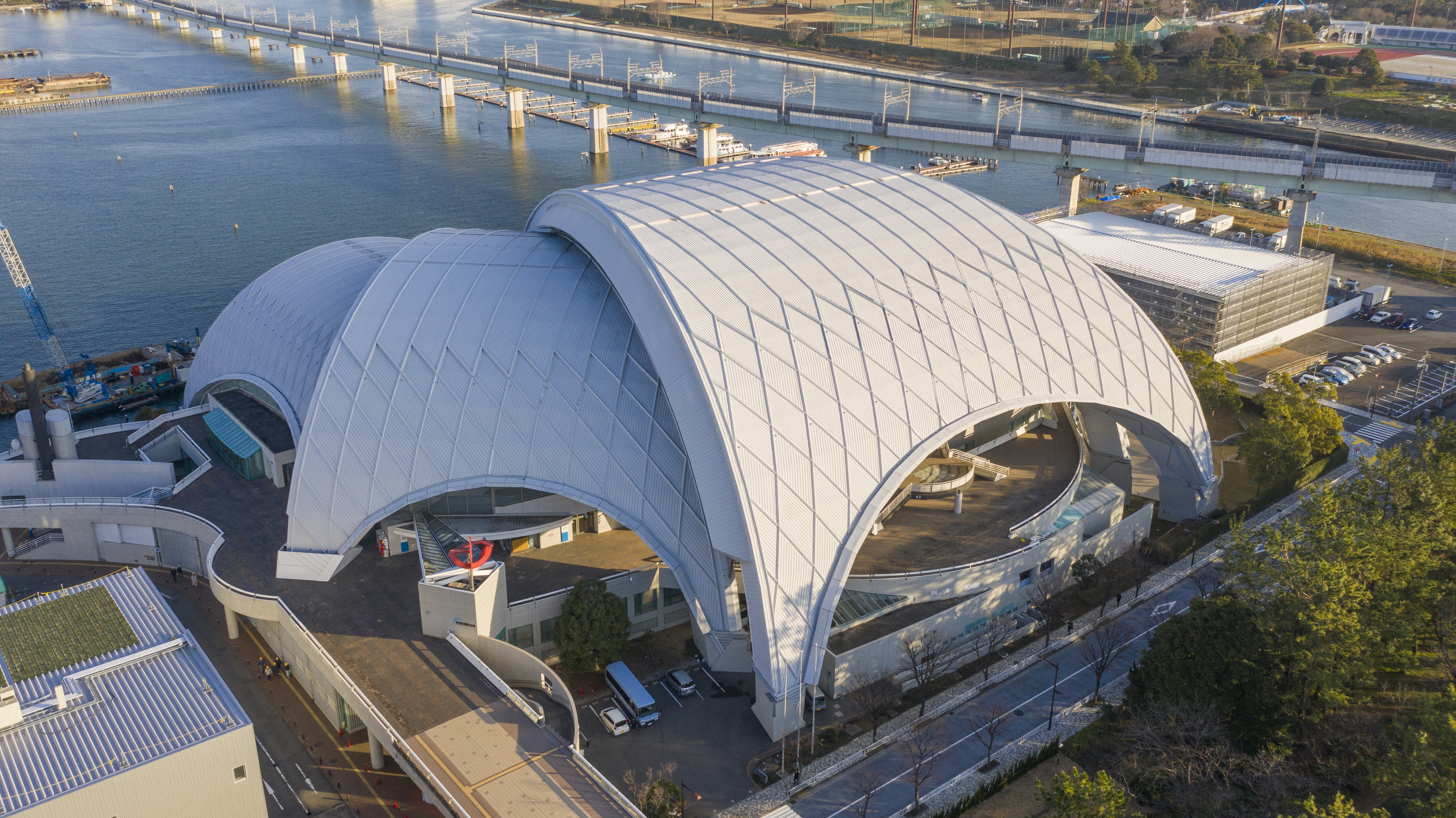
Tokyo Tatsumi International Swimming Center hosted water polo at the 2020 Summer Olympics.

The Paris Aquatics Centre hosted water polo at the 2024 Summer Olympics.

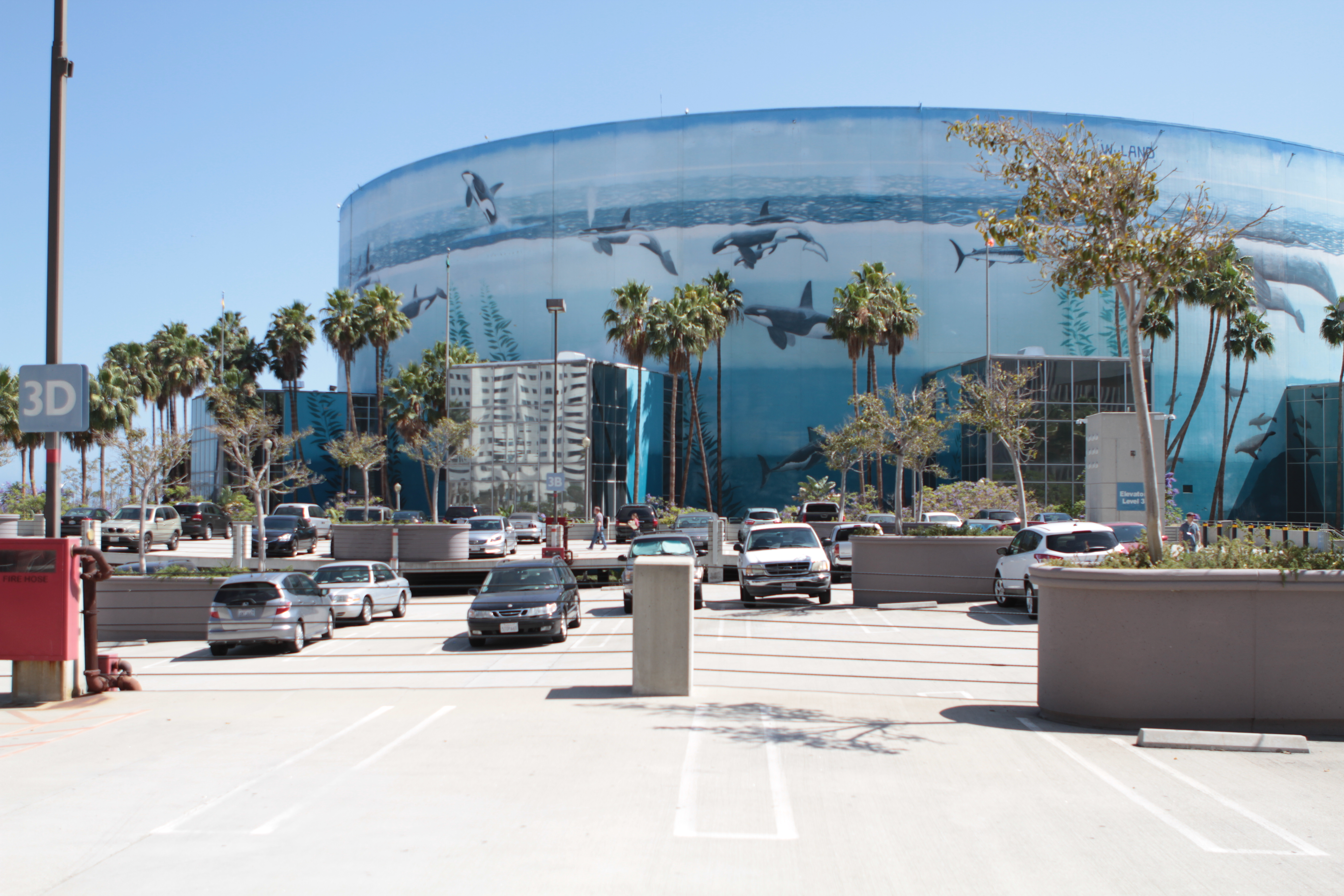
A temporary pool outside of the Long Beach Convention Center will host water polo at the 2028 Summer Olympics in Los Angeles.

== See also ==
- Water polo at the Summer Olympics
- Lists of Olympic water polo records and statistics
  - List of men's Olympic water polo tournament records and statistics
  - List of women's Olympic water polo tournament records and statistics
  - List of Olympic champions in men's water polo
  - List of Olympic champions in women's water polo
  - National team appearances in the men's Olympic water polo tournament
  - National team appearances in the women's Olympic water polo tournament
  - List of players who have appeared in multiple men's Olympic water polo tournaments
  - List of players who have appeared in multiple women's Olympic water polo tournaments
  - List of Olympic medalists in water polo (men)
  - List of Olympic medalists in water polo (women)
  - List of men's Olympic water polo tournament top goalscorers
  - List of women's Olympic water polo tournament top goalscorers
  - List of men's Olympic water polo tournament goalkeepers
  - List of women's Olympic water polo tournament goalkeepers

== Sources ==
=== Official Reports (IOC) ===
PDF documents in the LA84 Foundation Digital Library:

- Official Report of the 1896 Olympic Games (download, archive)
- Official Report of the 1900 Olympic Games (download, archive)
- Official Report of the 1904 Olympic Games (download, archive)
- Official Report of the 1908 Olympic Games (download, archive) (pp. 359–361)
- Official Report of the 1912 Olympic Games (download, archive) (pp. 1021–1024, 1031–1037)
- Official Report of the 1920 Olympic Games (download, archive) (p. 130)
- Official Report of the 1924 Olympic Games (download, archive) (pp. 439–440, 486–494)
- Official Report of the 1928 Olympic Games (download, archive) (pp. 746–757, 797–807)
- Official Report of the 1932 Olympic Games (download, archive) (pp. 619–623, 646–652)
- Official Report of the 1936 Olympic Games, v.2 (download, archive) (pp. 345–356)
- Official Report of the 1948 Olympic Games (download, archive) (pp. 537–540, 640–647)
- Official Report of the 1952 Olympic Games (download, archive) (pp. 600–608)
- Official Report of the 1956 Olympic Games (download, archive) (pp. 592–594, 624–627)
- Official Report of the 1960 Olympic Games (download, archive) (pp. 552–555, 617–634)
- Official Report of the 1964 Olympic Games, v.2 (download, archive) (pp. 682–698)
- Official Report of the 1968 Olympic Games, v.3 (download, archive) (pp. 449–466, 811–826)
- Official Report of the 1972 Olympic Games, v.3 (download, archive) (pp. 331, 353–365)
- Official Report of the 1976 Olympic Games, v.3 (download, archive) (pp. 446–447, 484–497)
- Official Report of the 1980 Olympic Games, v.3 (download, archive) (pp. 458, 495–510)
- Official Report of the 1984 Olympic Games, v.2 (download, archive) (pp. 528–534)
- Official Report of the 1988 Olympic Games, v.2 (download, archive) (pp. 590–598)
- Official Report of the 1992 Olympic Games, v.5 (download, archive) (pp. 354, 386–400)
- Official Report of the 1996 Olympic Games, v.3 (download, archive) (pp. 56–73)

=== Official Results Books (IOC) ===
PDF documents in the LA84 Foundation Digital Library:

- Official Results Book – 2000 Olympic Games – Water Polo (download, archive)
- Official Results Book – 2004 Olympic Games – Water Polo (download, archive)
- Official Results Book – 2008 Olympic Games – Water Polo (download, archive)

PDF documents on the FINA website:

- Official Results Book – 2012 Olympic Games – Diving, Swimming, Synchronised Swimming, Water Polo (archive) (pp. 284–507)

PDF documents in the Olympic World Library:

- Official Results Book – 2016 Olympic Games – Water Polo (archive)

PDF documents on the International Olympic Committee website:

- Official Results Book – 2020 Olympic Games – Water Polo (archive)

=== Official Reports (FINA) ===
PDF documents on the FINA website:

- HistoFINA – Water polo medalists and statistics (as of September 2019) (archive) (pp. 4–13, 56)
- 1870–2020 | 150 years of Water Polo – Evolution of its rules (archive)

=== Official website (IOC) ===
Water polo on the International Olympic Committee website:

- Water polo
- Men's water polo
- Women's water polo

=== Sports Reference ===
Water polo on the Sports Reference website:

- Country Medal Leaders & Athlete Medal Leaders (1900–2016) (archived)
- Men's water polo (1900–2016) (archived)
- Women's water polo (2000–2016) (archived)
- Water polo at the 1900 Summer Games (men's tournament) (archived)
- Water polo at the 1904 Summer Games (men's tournament) (archived)
- Water polo at the 1908 Summer Games (men's tournament) (archived)
- Water polo at the 1912 Summer Games (men's tournament) (archived)
- Water polo at the 1920 Summer Games (men's tournament) (archived)
- Water polo at the 1924 Summer Games (men's tournament) (archived)
- Water polo at the 1928 Summer Games (men's tournament) (archived)
- Water polo at the 1932 Summer Games (men's tournament) (archived)
- Water polo at the 1936 Summer Games (men's tournament) (archived)
- Water polo at the 1948 Summer Games (men's tournament) (archived)
- Water polo at the 1952 Summer Games (men's tournament) (archived)
- Water polo at the 1956 Summer Games (men's tournament) (archived)
- Water polo at the 1960 Summer Games (men's tournament) (archived)
- Water polo at the 1964 Summer Games (men's tournament) (archived)
- Water polo at the 1968 Summer Games (men's tournament) (archived)
- Water polo at the 1972 Summer Games (men's tournament) (archived)
- Water polo at the 1976 Summer Games (men's tournament) (archived)
- Water polo at the 1980 Summer Games (men's tournament) (archived)
- Water polo at the 1984 Summer Games (men's tournament) (archived)
- Water polo at the 1988 Summer Games (men's tournament) (archived)
- Water polo at the 1992 Summer Games (men's tournament) (archived)
- Water polo at the 1996 Summer Games (men's tournament) (archived)
- Water polo at the 2000 Summer Games (men's tournament, women's tournament) (archived)
- Water polo at the 2004 Summer Games (men's tournament, women's tournament) (archived)
- Water polo at the 2008 Summer Games (men's tournament, women's tournament) (archived)
- Water polo at the 2012 Summer Games (men's tournament, women's tournament) (archived)
- Water polo at the 2016 Summer Games (men's tournament, women's tournament) (archived)

=== Todor66 ===
Water polo on the Todor66 website:

- Water polo at the Summer Games
- Water polo at the 1900 Summer Olympics (men's tournament)
- Water polo at the 1904 Summer Olympics (men's tournament)
- Water polo at the 1908 Summer Olympics (men's tournament)
- Water polo at the 1912 Summer Olympics (men's tournament)
- Water polo at the 1920 Summer Olympics (men's tournament)
- Water polo at the 1924 Summer Olympics (men's tournament)
- Water polo at the 1928 Summer Olympics (men's tournament)
- Water polo at the 1932 Summer Olympics (men's tournament)
- Water polo at the 1936 Summer Olympics (men's tournament)
- Water polo at the 1948 Summer Olympics (men's tournament)
- Water polo at the 1952 Summer Olympics (men's tournament)
- Water polo at the 1956 Summer Olympics (men's tournament)
- Water polo at the 1960 Summer Olympics (men's tournament)
- Water polo at the 1964 Summer Olympics (men's tournament)
- Water polo at the 1968 Summer Olympics (men's tournament, men's qualification)
- Water polo at the 1972 Summer Olympics (men's tournament, men's qualification)
- Water polo at the 1976 Summer Olympics (men's tournament, men's European qualification)
- Water polo at the 1980 Summer Olympics (men's tournament, men's European qualification, men's world qualification)
- Water polo at the 1984 Summer Olympics (men's tournament, men's qualification)
- Water polo at the 1988 Summer Olympics (men's tournament, men's qualification)
- Water polo at the 1992 Summer Olympics (men's tournament, men's qualification)
- Water polo at the 1996 Summer Olympics (men's tournament, men's qualification)
- Water polo at the 2000 Summer Olympics (men's tournament, men's qualification, women's tournament, women's qualification)
- Water polo at the 2004 Summer Olympics (men's tournament, men's qualification, women's tournament, women's qualification)
- Water polo at the 2008 Summer Olympics (men's tournament, men's qualification, women's tournament, women's qualification)
- Water polo at the 2012 Summer Olympics (men's tournament, men's qualification, women's tournament, women's qualification)
- Water polo at the 2016 Summer Olympics (men's tournament, men's qualification, women's tournament, women's qualification)
- Water polo at the 2020 Summer Olympics (men's tournament, men's qualification, women's tournament, women's qualification)
