= Toma Tomov (water polo) =

Bulgarian water polo player (1946–2022)

Personal information
- Nationality: Bulgarian
- Born: 17 November 1946; Bulgaria
- Died: 21 November 2022 (aged 76); Bulgaria

Sport
- Sport: Water polo

Toma Tomov (Bulgarian: Тома Томов, 17 November 1946 – 21 November 2022) was a Bulgarian water polo player. He competed in the men's tournament at the 1972 Summer Olympics.
