= Oberschleißheim Regatta Course =

Bavarian rowing venue, Germany

Coordinates: 48°14′34″N 11°30′54″E

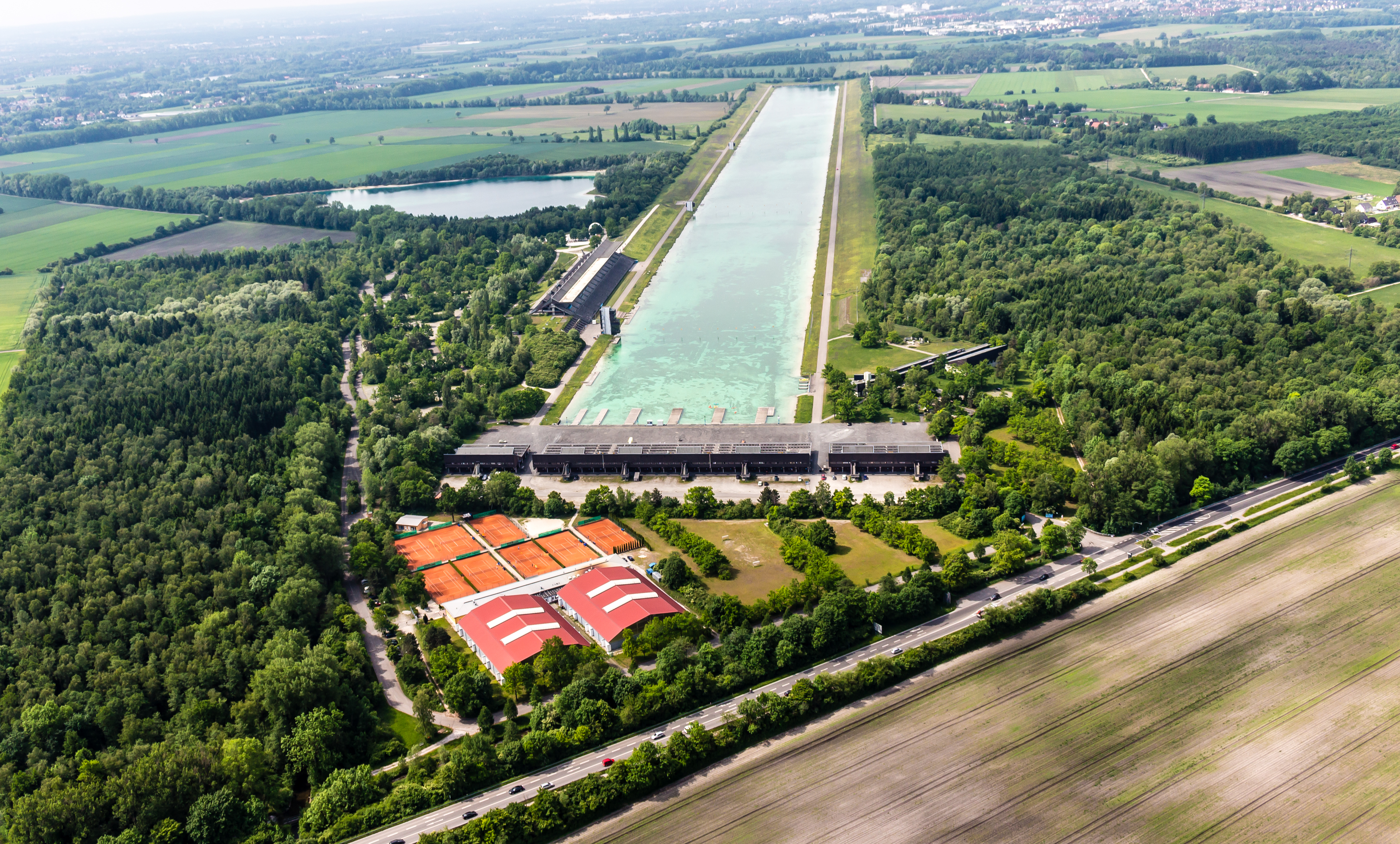
Regattastrecke Oberschleißheim near Munich in Germany. The part next to the viewer is the finish area with the boat houses; the red areas are courts from a nearby tennis club.

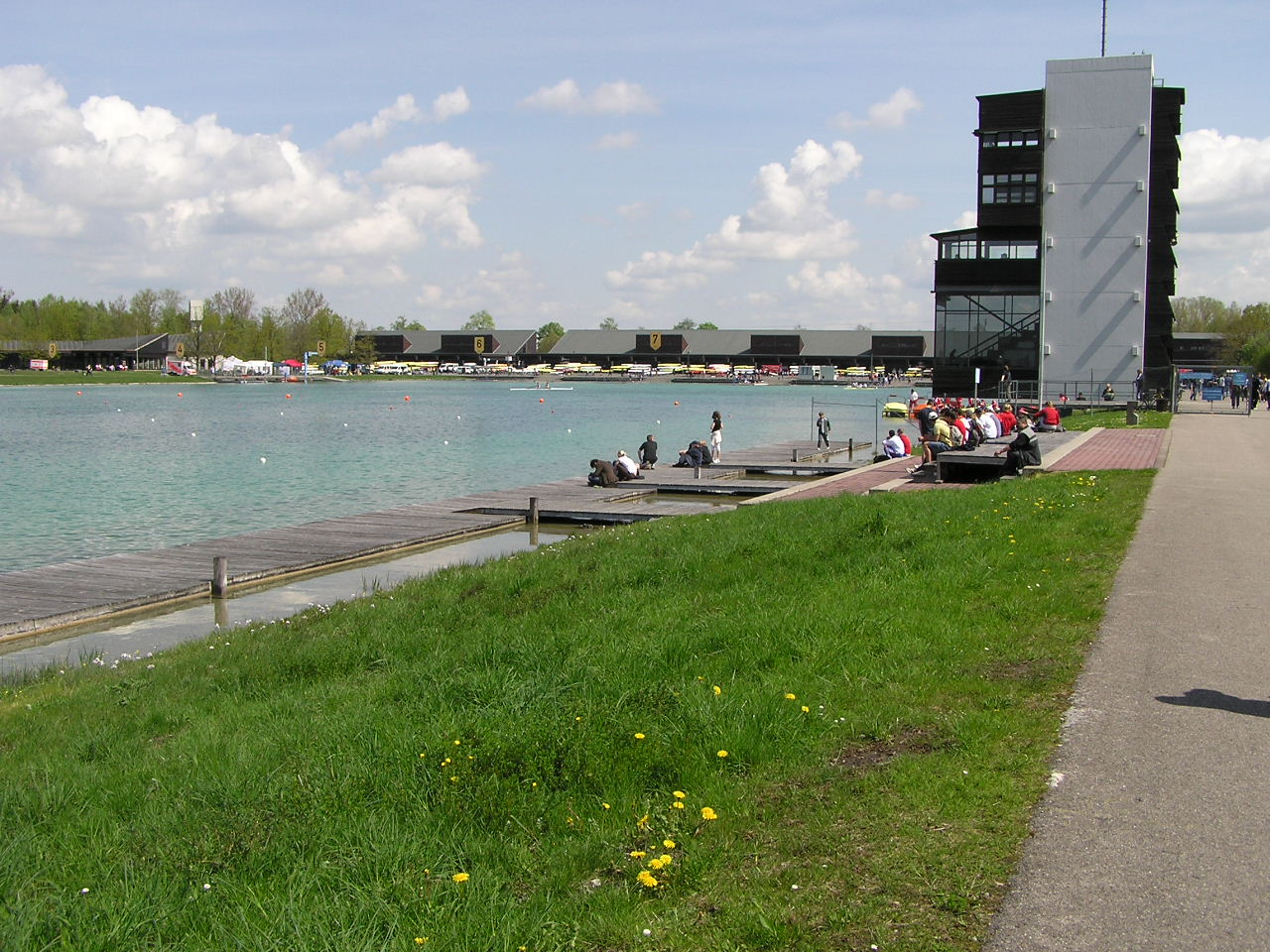
View from below the grandstand towards the finish tower and the boat houses in the background

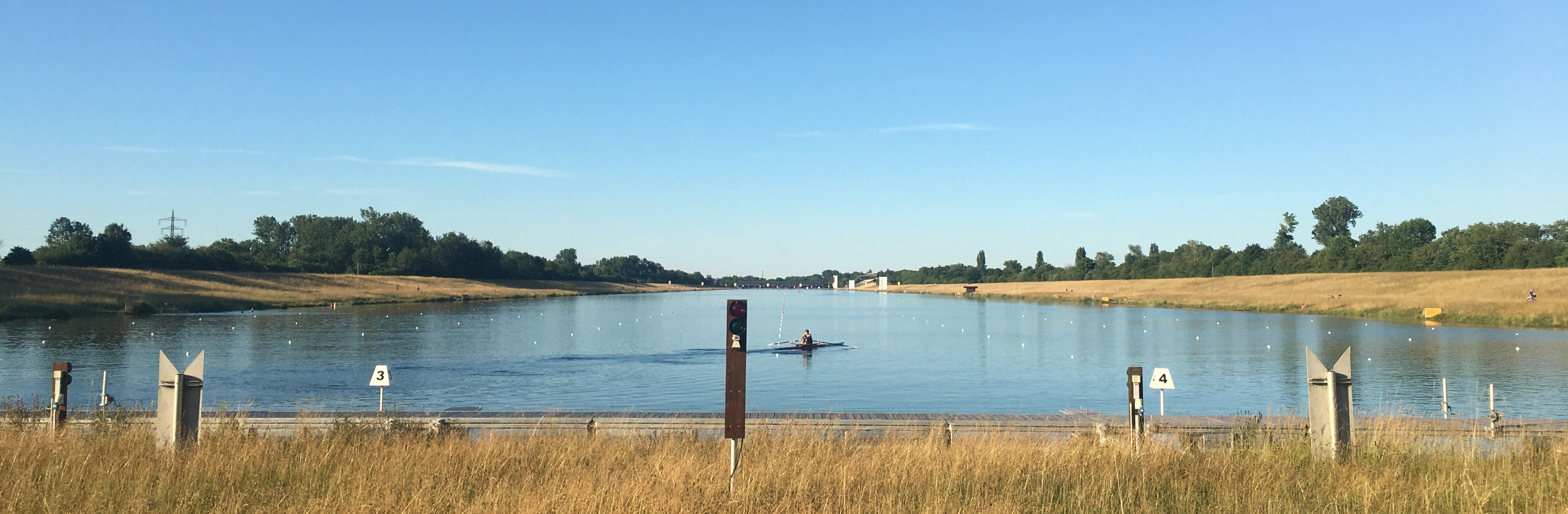
View from the start tower at the southern end towards the finish

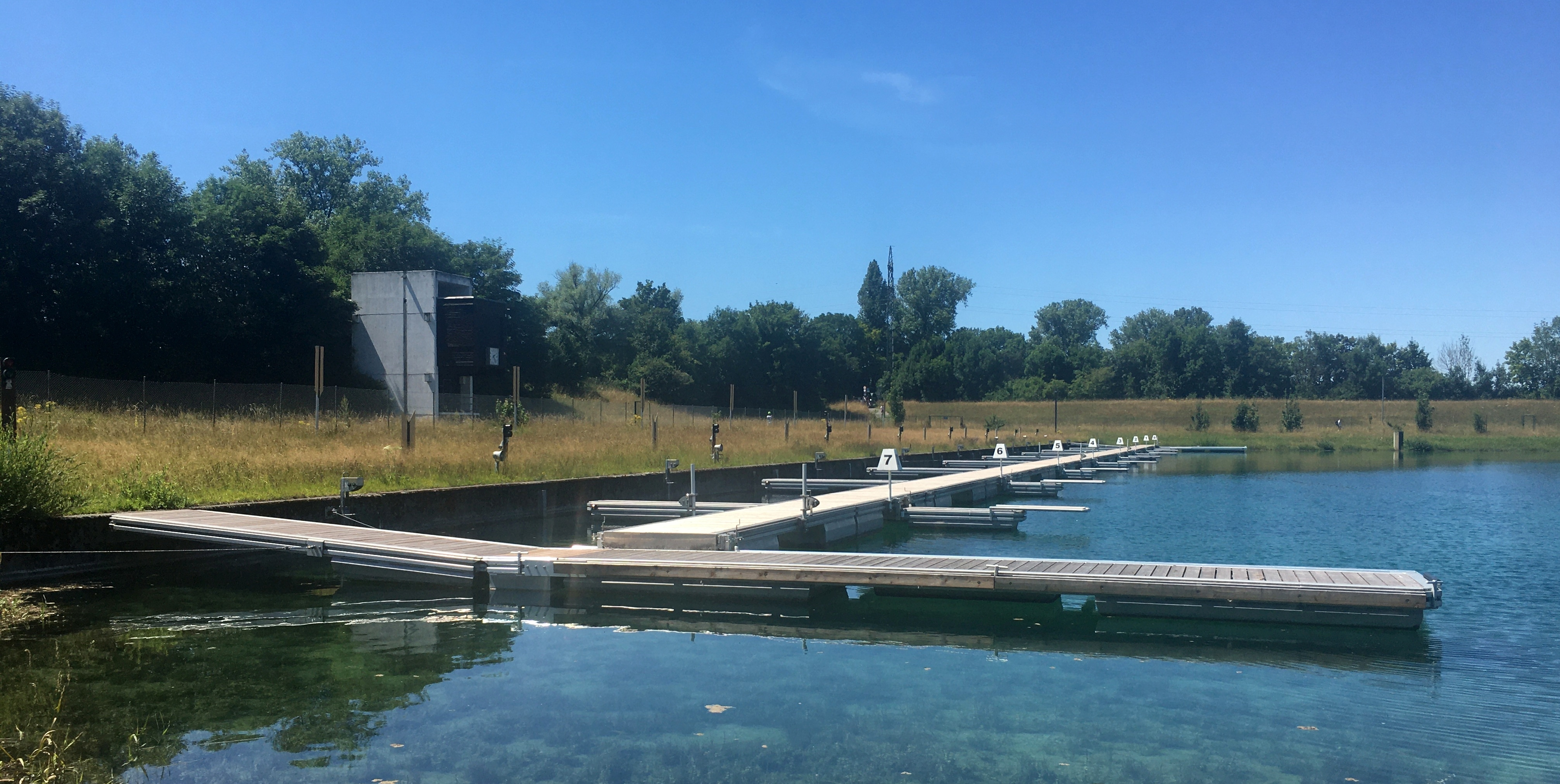
Berth at the start area with start tower in the middle

The Regattastrecke Oberschleißheim is a rowing venue situated in Oberschleißheim near München in Germany. It was built for the rowing and canoeing events of the 1972 Summer Olympics, and has since hosted numerous world rowing events. It is in everyday use by a number of rowing and canoeing clubs and has the official description "Leistungszentrum für Rudern und Kanu" (Engl. performance center for rowing and canoe).

== History ==
In 1972 an artificial canoe sprint and rowing venue was created in Oberschleißheim for the Munich Olympic Summer Games. The course is 2 kilometres (1.2 mi) long and 135 metres (443 ft) wide, and is in regular use. The course is accessible through Munich's public transport and roading network. The stands have a capacity for 9,500 spectators.

== Major events ==
=== Olympics ===
- 1972 Summer Olympics

=== World Rowing Championships ===
Two World Rowing Championships have been held at the venue:

- 1981 World Rowing Championships
- 2007 World Rowing Championships

=== World Rowing Cup ===
World Rowing Cups are regularly held at Oberschleißheim.

- 1997 Rowing World Cup I
- 1998 Rowing World Cup I
- 2000 Rowing World Cup I
- 2001 Rowing World Cup IV
- 2002 Rowing World Cup III
- 2003 Rowing World Cup II
- 2004 Rowing World Cup II
- 2005 Rowing World Cup II
- 2006 Rowing World Cup I
- 2008 Rowing World Cup I
- 2009 Rowing World Cup II
- 2010 Rowing World Cup II
- 2011 Rowing World Cup I

== Flora and Fauna in the Regatta Trough ==
In addition to the brook and rainbow trout already introduced into the regatta course for the Olympic Games, which were intended to prevent excessive growth of aquatic plants, other fish species such as carp, pike, perch and eels were later added. In 2006, 3,000 noble crayfish were also relocated from Lake Eibsee to the clean water of the Oberschleißheim regatta course to give them a better chance of survival.

== Panoramic view ==
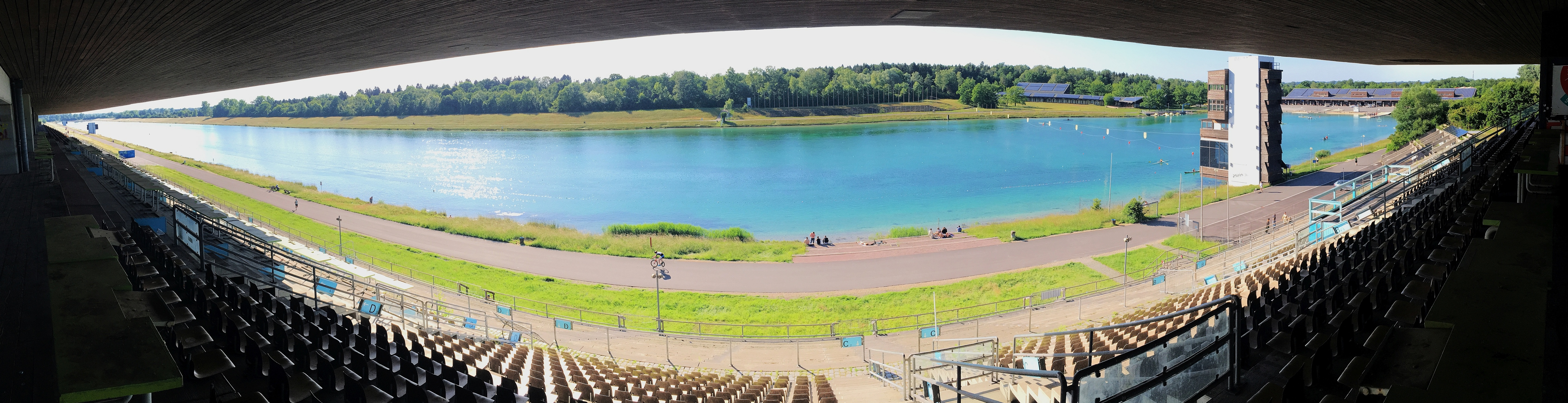
Panoramic view from the top seat rows of the grandstand, during the 1972 Olympics reserved for the press, on the rowing venue. To the right is the finish tower, far right the boat houses.

== See also ==
- Venues of the 1972 Summer Olympics
- World Rowing Championships
- Zentrale Hochschulsportanlage
