= Carlos Sánchez (water polo) =

Cuban water polo player (born 1952)

Personal information
- Nationality: Cuban
- Born: 9 January 1952 (age 73)

Sport
- Sport: Water polo

Carlos Sánchez (born 9 January 1952) is a Cuban water polo player. He competed in the men's tournament at the 1972 Summer Olympics.
