= H. J. Nossek =

American sports coach, physician (1893–1965)

Biographical details
- Born: February 9, 1893; Connecticut, U.S.
- Died: September 7, 1965 (aged 72); Lodi, California, U.S.

Playing career

Football
- c. 1920: Springfield

Coaching career (HC unless noted)

Football
- 1923: Doane

Basketball
- 1923–1924: Doane

Administrative career (AD unless noted)
- 1923–1924: Doane

Head coaching record
- Overall: 3–4 (football); 4–13 (basketball)

Harry Joseph Nossek (February 9, 1893 – September 7, 1965) was an American football and basketball coach, athletics administrator, educator, and physician. He was served as football coach at Doane College in Crete, Nebraska for one season, in 1923, compiling a record of 3–4. Nossek was also the head basketball coach at Doane in 1923–24, tallying a mark of 4–13.

A native of New London, Connecticut, Nossek attended school in Lebanon, Ohio, and then the International YMCA College—now known as Springfield College—in Springfield, Massachusetts, where he played football for three years before graduating in 1923. That year, he was hired as the athletic director at Doane.

Nossek served as a sergeant in the United States Army during World War I. He graduated from the Los Angeles College of Medicine in 1931. He practiced medicine in Lodi, California. Nossek died on September 7, 1965, at his office in Lodi.

== Head coaching record ==
=== Football ===
Year	Team	Overall	Conference	Standing	Bowl/playoffs
Doane Tigers (Nebraska Intercollegiate Conference) (1923)
1923	Doane	3–4	3–4	7th	
Doane:		3–4	3–4		
Total:		3–4			
