= Ingulf Nossek =

German water polo player

Personal information
- Nationality: German
- Born: 14 February 1944; České Budějovice, Protectorate of Bohemia and Moravia
- Died: 19 July 1999 (aged 55)

Sport
- Sport: Water polo

Ingulf Nossek (14 February 1944 – 19 July 1999) was a German water polo player. He competed in the men's tournament at the 1972 Summer Olympics.
