= Water polo at the 1972 Summer Olympics =

Water polo at the Games of the XX Olympiad
- pictogram for Aquatics, also used for Swimming and Diving
- Venues: Dantebad; Olympia Schwimmhalle (final)
- Date: 27 August – 4 September 1972
- Competitors: 176 from 16 nations

Medalists
1st place, gold medalist(s)		Soviet Union
2nd place, silver medalist(s)		Hungary
3rd place, bronze medalist(s)		United States

Final results for the water polo competition at the 1972 Summer Olympics held in Munich.

== Qualification ==
Event	Dates	Hosts	Quotas	Qualified Teams
Host Nation	26 April 1966	Munich	1	West Germany
1968 Summer Olympics	14-26 October 1968	Mexico City	5	Yugoslavia
1968 Summer Olympics	14-26 October 1968	Mexico City	5	Soviet Union
1968 Summer Olympics	14-26 October 1968	Mexico City	5	Hungary
1968 Summer Olympics	14-26 October 1968	Mexico City	5	Italy
1968 Summer Olympics	14-26 October 1968	Mexico City	5	United States
1971 Pan American Games	26 July - 1 August 1971	(Colombia) Cali	3	Cuba
1971 Pan American Games	26 July - 1 August 1971	(Colombia) Cali	3	Mexico
1971 Pan American Games	26 July - 1 August 1971	(Colombia) Cali	3	~~Brazil~~ Canada
European Qualifier	14-20 May 1972	(West Germany) Munich	4	Romania
European Qualifier	14-20 May 1972	(West Germany) Munich	4	Spain
European Qualifier	14-20 May 1972	(West Germany) Munich	4	Bulgaria
European Qualifier	14-20 May 1972	(West Germany) Munich	4	Greece
Oceania Qualifier			1	Australia
Asian Qualifier			1	Japan
Reallocation			1	Netherlands
Total			16	

== Medalists ==
Gold	Silver	Bronze
Soviet Union Anatoli Akimov; Aleksei Barkalov; Vadim Gulyaev; Aleksandr Dolgushin; Aleksandr Dreval; Vladimir Shmudski; Aleksandr Kabanov; Leonid Osipov; Viacheslav Sobtschenko; Nikolai Melnikov Aleksandr Schidlovski	Hungary András Bodnár; Tibor Cservenyák; István Görgényi; Tamás Faragó; Zoltán Kásás; Ferenc Konrád; István Magas; Dénes Pócsik; László Sárosi; Endre Molnár István Szívós, Jr.	United States Peter Asch; Steven Barnett; Bruce Bradley; Stanley Cole; James Ferguson; Eric Lindroth; John Parker; Gary Sheerer; James Slatton; Russell Webb Barry Weitzenberg

== Preliminary round ==
=== Pool A ===
Nation	Pld	W	D	L	GF	GA
United States	5	5	0	0	31	18
Yugoslavia	5	4	0	1	35	24
Cuba	5	3	0	2	28	23
Romania	5	2	0	3	38	26
Mexico	5	1	0	4	25	30
Canada	5	0	0	5	14	50

	27 August		1st	2nd	3rd	4th
Yugoslavia	12-4	Canada	3-1	4-1	3-1	2-1
Mexico	4-6	Cuba	1-2	0-1	1-1	2-2
Romania	3-4	United States	0-1	1-2	1-0	1-1

	28 August		1st	2nd	3rd	4th
United States	7-6	Cuba	1-1	1-0	2-1	3-4
Mexico	7-3	Canada	2-1	0-1	1-0	4-1
Romania	7-8	Yugoslavia	3-2	2-1	2-2	0-3

	29 August		1st	2nd	3rd	4th
United States	8-1	Canada	2-0	3-0	1-0	2-1
Mexico	3-5	Yugoslavia	0-1	1-1	1-3	1-0
Romania	3-4	Cuba	0-2	2-1	0-1	1-0

	30 August		1st	2nd	3rd	4th
Yugoslavia	7-5	Cuba	0-2	3-1	2-1	2-1
Romania	16-4	Canada	1-1	6-1	5-1	4-1
Mexico	5-7	United States	1-1	1-4	1-1	2-1

	31 August		1st	2nd	3rd	4th
Cuba	7-2	Canada	2-0	2-0	1-2	2-0
Yugoslavia	3-5	United States	0-1	1-1	1-2	1-1
Romania	9-6	Mexico	2-2	3-1	2-0	2-3

=== Pool B ===
Nation	Pld	W	D	L	GF	GA
Hungary	4	3	1	0	22	6
West Germany	4	2	2	0	21	13
Netherlands	4	2	1	1	14	11
Australia	4	0	1	3	14	27
Greece	4	0	1	3	13	27

	27 August		1st	2nd	3rd	4th
Hungary	3-0	Netherlands	0-0	2-0	0-0	1-0
Greece	7-7	Australia	3-3	2-1	1-2	1-1

	28 August		1st	2nd	3rd	4th
Australia	2-4	Netherlands	1-0	0-0	0-1	1-3
West Germany	3-3	Hungary	1-0	0-1	0-2	2-0

	29 August		1st	2nd	3rd	4th
West Germany	4-4	Netherlands	2-1	1-0	0-1	1-2
Greece	1-6	Hungary	0-3	0-0	0-2	1-1

	30 August		1st	2nd	3rd	4th
Australia	2-10	Hungary	0-3	1-2	0-3	1-2
West Germany	8-3	Greece	3-1	3-1	1-1	1-0

	31 August		1st	2nd	3rd	4th
West Germany	6-3	Australia	1-1	2-0	1-0	2-2
Greece	2-6	Netherlands	1-0	0-2	1-3	0-1

=== Pool C ===
Nation	Pld	W	D	L	GF	GA
Soviet Union	4	4	0	0	30	9
Italy	4	3	0	1	27	16
Spain	4	2	0	2	19	22
Bulgaria	4	1	0	3	18	25
Japan	4	0	0	4	14	36

	28 August		1st	2nd	3rd	4th
Spain	6-4	Japan	2-1	1-2	1-1	2-0
Italy	1-4	Soviet Union	1-0	0-2	0-2	0-0

	28 August		1st	2nd	3rd	4th
Soviet Union	11-1	Japan	1-0	4-1	3-0	3-0
Italy	8-5	Bulgaria	3-1	3-2	2-1	0-1

	29 August		1st	2nd	3rd	4th
Soviet Union	7-2	Bulgaria	2-0	2-1	2-0	1-1
Italy	6-2	Spain	1-0	0-1	2-1	3-0

	30 August		1st	2nd	3rd	4th
Bulgaria	7-4	Japan	3-1	0-1	2-1	2-1
Spain	5-8	Soviet Union	0-1	1-2	2-2	2-3

	31 August		1st	2nd	3rd	4th
Italy	12-5	Japan	4-1	3-0	1-1	4-3
Spain	6-4	Bulgaria	0-0	2-1	2-1	2-2

== Final round ==
=== Group II (Classification 7th – 12th) ===
Pos.	Nation	Pld	W	D	L	GF	GA
7	Netherlands	5	4	1	0	29	20
8	Romania	5	3	1	1	24	19
9	Cuba	5	3	1	1	24	23
10	Spain	5	2	0	3	26	26
11	Bulgaria	5	0	2	3	17	23
12	Australia	5	0	1	4	18	27

	1 September		1st	2nd	3rd	4th
Romania	7-4	Spain	1-2	2-0	0-0	4-2
Netherlands	5-2	Bulgaria	1-0	0-1	2-1	2-0
Cuba	6-5	Australia	1-1	3-2	1-1	1-1

	2 September		1st	2nd	3rd	4th
Romania	4-3	Bulgaria	2-2	1-0	1-0	0-1
Australia	4-8	Spain	0-1	2-1	1-3	1-3
Cuba	6-8	Netherlands	2-1	2-5	0-2	2-0

	3 September		1st	2nd	3rd	4th
Australia	4-4	Bulgaria	2-2	1-0	1-1	0-1
Romania	5-5	Netherlands	2-2	1-2	0-1	2-0
Cuba	4-3	Spain	2-1	1-2	0-0	1-0

	4 September		1st	2nd	3rd	4th
Cuba	4-4	Bulgaria	0-0	2-3	1-0	1-1
Romania	5-3	Australia	1-1	2-1	1-0	1-1
Netherlands	7-5	Spain	0-1	3-0	2-2	2-2

Results taken from Preliminary Round

			1st	2nd	3rd	4th
Cuba	4-3	Romania	?-?	?-?	?-?	?-?
Netherlands	4-2	Australia	?-?	?-?	?-?	?-?
Spain	6-4	Bulgaria	?-?	?-?	?-?	?-?

=== Group I (Classification Gold – 6th) ===
Pos.	Nation	Pld	W	D	L	GF	GA
1	Soviet Union	5	3	2	0	22	16
2	Hungary	5	3	2	0	23	18
3	United States	5	2	2	1	24	23
4	West Germany	5	0	3	2	15	18
5	Yugoslavia	5	1	1	3	20	24
6	Italy	5	0	2	3	21	26

	1 September		1st	2nd	3rd	4th
Hungary	8-7	Italy	1-0	2-1	3-4	2-2
United States	4-4	West Germany	3-1	1-1	0-0	0-2
Yugoslavia	4-5	Soviet Union	1-2	0-2	2-0	1-1

	2 September		1st	2nd	3rd	4th
Yugoslavia	6-6	Italy	2-2	2-1	1-1	1-2
West Germany	2-4	Soviet Union	1:1	1:3	0:0	0:0
United States	3-5	Hungary	0-0	1-2	2-2	0-1

	3 September		1st	2nd	3rd	4th
West Germany	2-2	Italy	1-2	0-0	0-0	1-0
Yugoslavia	2-4	Hungary	0-1	1-1	0-1	1-1
United States	6-6	Soviet Union	0-1	3-1	2-2	1-2

	4 September		1st	2nd	3rd	4th
Yugoslavia	5-4	West Germany	3-0	0-1	1-1	1-2
United States	6-5	Italy	2-1	1-1	2-1	1-2
Hungary	3-3	Soviet Union	2-1	1-1	0-1	0-0

Results taken from Preliminary Round

			1st	2nd	3rd	4th
United States	5-3	Yugoslavia	?-?	?-?	?-?	?-?
Soviet Union	4-1	Italy	?-?	?-?	?-?	?-?
West Germany	3-3	Hungary	0-1	1-0	0-2	2-0

== Final ranking ==
1. Soviet Union
2. Hungary
3. United States
4. West Germany
5. Yugoslavia
6. Italy
7. Netherlands
8. Romania
9. Cuba
10. Spain
11. Bulgaria
12. Australia
13. Mexico
14. Greece
15. Japan
16. Canada

1972 Men's Olympic Games winners

Soviet Union
First title

=== Top goalscorers ===
Rank	Name	Goals
1	(Cuba) Carlos Sanchez	18
2	(United States) Bruce Bradley	17
3	(Netherlands) Mart Bras	16
3	(Cuba) Juan Janac	16
5	(Italy) Eraldo Pizzo	12
5	(Romania) Gheorghe Zamfirescu	12
5	(Australia) Les Nunn	12
8	(Soviet Union) Aleksandr Dreval	11
8	(West Germany) Ingulf Nossek	11
8	(Italy) Gianni De Magistris	11
8	(Bulgaria) Toma Tomov	11
8	(Mexico) Armando Fernandez	11
13	(Soviet Union) Anatoly Akimov	10
13	(Soviet Union) Oleksiy Barkalov	10
13	(Romania) Viorel Rus	10

== See also ==
- 1973 FINA Men's World Water Polo Championship

== Sources ==
- PDF documents in the LA84 Foundation Digital Library:
  - Official Report of the 1972 Olympic Games, v.3 (download, archive) (pp. 331, 353–365)
- Water polo on the Olympedia website
  - Water polo at the 1972 Summer Olympics (men's tournament)
- Water polo on the Sports Reference website
  - Water polo at the 1972 Summer Games (men's tournament) (archived)
