= Dantebad =

Aquatics venue in Munich, Germany

Coordinates: 48°10′01″N 11°31′51″E

Dantebad is an aquatics venue located in the greater Munich, Germany area. During the 1972 Summer Olympics, it hosted preliminaries for the water polo competition.

The venue was considered as host for the swimming and diving competition when Munich was awarded the games in 1966, but was not up to standards for FINA who only allowed those competitions to be indoors.
