= August 5 =

August 5 this year in various calendars
- Wednesday, 5 August 2026
Akan	Nkyiwukuo
Armenian	16 Nawasardi 1476
Aztec	Pānquetzaliztli 7, 13 Cuāuhtli
Babylonian	21 Du'uzu, 2337 SE
Balinese pawukon	Luang, Pepet, Kajeng, Sri, Wage, Urukung, Buda of Merakih, Sri, Gigis, Pati
Bengali	21 Shrabon, BS 1433
Chinese	Yin Metal Pig・Wall Mansion; Fire Horse Year, Month 6, Day 23 (Dashu, 2 days until Liqiu)
Common Era	5 August 2026 CE
Coptic	29 Epip, AM 1742
Egyptian	21 Choiak, 2775 NE
Ethiopian	29 Ḥamlē, 2018 Amätä Məhrät
French Republican	Décade II, Octidi de Thermidor de l'Année 234 de la République
Gregorian	5 August, AD 2026
Hebrew	22 Av, AM 5786
Hindu	Aśvinī・Śūla; Solar: 20 Śrāvaṇa, 1948 SE; Lunisolar: Saptamī, Kṛishna pakṣa of Āṣāḍha, 2083 VE; Rāudra・5127 KY・1,872,792
Icelandic	Miðvikudagur, 11 Heyannir 2026
Islamic	20 Safar, AH 1448 (using tabular method)
ISO week date	2026-W32-3
Japanese	23 Minazuki, Reiwa 8 (Taisho, 2 days until Risshū)
Julian	23 July, AD 2026 (AM 7534)
Julian day	2461258
Korean	23 Yangdal, 4359 DE
Maya	13.0.13.14.15; 8 Yaxkin, 13 Men
Roman	ante diem X Kalendas Augustas, MMDCCLXXIX AUC
Solar Hijri	14 Mordad, SH 1405
Tibetan	22 chu stod, me pho rta 2153 or 1772 or 1000

<<	August					>>
Su	Mo	Tu	We	Th	Fr	Sa
						1
2	3	4	5	6	7	8
9	10	11	12	13	14	15
16	17	18	19	20	21	22
23	24	25	26	27	28	29
30	31
2026

August 5 in recent years
2026 (Wednesday)
2025 (Tuesday)
2024 (Monday)
2023 (Saturday)
2022 (Friday)
2021 (Thursday)
2020 (Wednesday)
2019 (Monday)
2018 (Sunday)
2017 (Saturday)

August 5 is the 217th day of the year (218th in leap years) in the Gregorian calendar; 148 days remain until the end of the year.

== Events ==
=== Pre-1600 ===
- AD 25 – Guangwu claims the throne as Emperor of China, restoring the Han dynasty after the collapse of the short-lived Xin dynasty.
- 70 – Fires resulting from the destruction of the Second Temple in Jerusalem are extinguished.
- 642 – Battle of Maserfield: Penda of Mercia defeats and kills Oswald of Northumbria.
- 910 – The last major Danish army to raid England for nearly a century is defeated at the Battle of Tettenhall by the allied forces of Mercia and Wessex, led by King Edward the Elder and Æthelred, Lord of the Mercians.
- 939 – The Battle of Alhandic is fought between Ramiro II of León and Abd-ar-Rahman III at Zamora in the context of the Spanish Reconquista. The battle resulted in a victory for the Emirate of Córdoba.
- 974 – Abbasid Caliph al-Muti' is forced to abdicate by his Turkic general Sabuktakin and succeeded by his son al-Ta'i'.
- 1068 – Byzantine–Norman wars: Italo-Normans begin a nearly-three-year siege of Bari.
- 1100 – Henry I is crowned King of England in Westminster Abbey.
- 1192 – Richard I of England defeats Saladin in the battle of Jaffa, which enables him to conclude a favourable treaty for the crusaders.
- 1278 – Spanish Reconquista: the forces of the Kingdom of Castile initiate the ultimately futile Siege of Algeciras against the Emirate of Granada.
- 1305 – First Scottish War of Independence: Sir John Stewart of Menteith, the pro-English Sheriff of Dumbarton, successfully manages to capture Sir William Wallace of Scotland, leading to Wallace's subsequent execution by hanging, evisceration, drawing and quartering, and beheading 18 days later.
- 1388 – The Battle of Otterburn, a border skirmish between the Scottish and the English in Northern England, is fought near Otterburn.
- 1460 – The Kingdom of Scotland captures Roxburgh, one of the last English strongholds in Scotland, following a siege.
- 1506 – The Grand Duchy of Lithuania defeats the Crimean Khanate in the Battle of Kletsk.
- 1583 – Sir Humphrey Gilbert establishes the first English colony in North America, at what is now St. John's, Newfoundland and Labrador.
- 1600 – The Gowrie Conspiracy against King James VI of Scotland (later to become King James I of England) takes place at Gowrie House (Perth, Scotland).

=== 1601–1900 ===
- 1620 – The Mayflower departs from Southampton, England, carrying would-be settlers, on its first attempt to reach North America; it is forced to dock in Dartmouth when its companion ship, the Speedwell, springs a leak.
- 1689 – Beaver Wars: Fifteen hundred Iroquois attack Lachine in New France.
- 1716 – Austro-Turkish War (1716–1718):The Austrians defeat the Ottomans in the Battle of Petrovaradin. One-fifth of a Turkish army and the Grand Vizier are killed.
- 1735 – Freedom of the press: New York Weekly Journal writer John Peter Zenger is acquitted of seditious libel against the royal governor of New York, on the basis that what he had published was true.
- 1763 – Pontiac's War: Battle of Bushy Run: British forces led by Henry Bouquet defeat Chief Pontiac's Indians at Bushy Run.
- 1766 – An earthquake in the Sea of Marmara and Gallipoli (present-day Turkey) along the North Anatolian Fault kills at least 5,000 people.
- 1772 – First Partition of Poland: The representatives of Austria, Prussia, and Russia sign three bilateral conventions condemning the "anarchy" of the Polish–Lithuanian Commonwealth and imputing to the three powers "ancient and legitimate rights" to the territories of the Commonwealth. The conventions allow each of the three great powers to annex a part of the Commonwealth, which they proceed to do over the course of the following two months.
- 1781 – British and Dutch ships engage in the second Battle of Dogger Bank.
- 1796 – The Battle of Castiglione in Napoleon's first Italian campaigns of the French Revolutionary Wars results in a French victory.
- 1816 – The British Admiralty dismisses Francis Ronalds's new invention of the first working electric telegraph as "wholly unnecessary", preferring to continue using the semaphore.
- 1824 – Greek War of Independence: Konstantinos Kanaris leads a Greek fleet to victory against Ottoman and Egyptian naval forces in the Battle of Samos.
- 1858 – Cyrus West Field and others complete the first transatlantic telegraph cable after several unsuccessful attempts. It will operate for less than a month.
- 1860 – Charles XV of Sweden–Norway is crowned king of Norway in Trondheim.
- 1861 – American Civil War: In order to help pay for the war effort, the United States government levies the first income tax as part of the Revenue Act of 1861 (3% of all incomes over US$800; rescinded in 1872).
- 1861 – The United States Army abolishes flogging.
- 1862 – American Civil War: Battle of Baton Rouge: Along the Mississippi River near Baton Rouge, Louisiana, Confederate troops attempt to take the city, but are driven back by fire from Union gunboats.
- 1864 – American Civil War: The Battle of Mobile Bay begins at Mobile Bay near Mobile, Alabama, Admiral David Farragut leads a Union flotilla through Confederate defenses and seals one of the last major Southern ports.
- 1874 – Japan launches its postal savings system, modeled after a similar system in the United Kingdom.
- 1882 – Standard Oil Company of New Jersey, today known as ExxonMobil, is established officially. The company would later grow to become the holder of all Standard Oil companies and the entity at the center of the breakup of Standard Oil.
- 1884 – The cornerstone for the Statue of Liberty is laid on Bedloe's Island (now Liberty Island) in New York Harbor.
- 1888 – Bertha Benz drives from Mannheim to Pforzheim and back in the first long distance automobile trip, commemorated as the Bertha Benz Memorial Route since 2008.

=== 1901–present ===
- 1901 – Peter O'Connor sets the first World Athletics recognised long jump world record of 24 ft 11.75 in (7.6137 m), a record that would stand for 20 years.
- 1906 – Persian Constitutional Revolution: Mozaffar ad-Din Shah Qajar, King of Iran, agrees to convert the government to a constitutional monarchy.
- 1914 – World War I: The German minelayer SS Königin Luise lays a minefield about 40 miles (64 km) off the Thames Estuary (Lowestoft). She is intercepted and sunk by the British light-cruiser HMS Amphion.
- 1914 – World War I: The guns of Point Nepean fort at Port Phillip Heads in Victoria (Australia) fire across the bows of the Norddeutscher Lloyd steamer SS Pfalz which is attempting to leave the Port of Melbourne in ignorance of the declaration of war and she is detained; this is said to be the first Allied shot of the War.
- 1914 – In Cleveland, Ohio, the first electric traffic light is installed.
- 1916 – World War I: Battle of Romani: Allied forces, under the command of Archibald Murray, defeat an attacking Ottoman army under the command of Friedrich Freiherr Kress von Kressenstein, securing the Suez Canal and beginning the Ottoman retreat from the Sinai Peninsula.
- 1925 – Plaid Cymru is formed with the aim of disseminating knowledge of the Welsh language that is at the time in danger of dying out.
- 1926 – Harry Houdini performs his greatest feat, spending 91 minutes underwater in a sealed tank before escaping.
- 1931 – Judge and Nazi Party member Werner Best drafts the Boxheim Documents, which described a violent takeover of the government by the NSDAP.
- 1939 – The Thirteen Roses: Thirteen female members of the Unified Socialist Youth are executed by Francoist forces in Madrid, Spain.
- 1940 – World War II: The Soviet Union formally annexes Latvia.
- 1944 – World War II: At least 1,104 Japanese POWs in Australia attempt to escape from a camp at Cowra, New South Wales; 545 temporarily succeed but are later either killed, commit suicide, or are recaptured.
- 1944 – World War II: Polish insurgents liberate a German labor camp (Gęsiówka) in Warsaw, freeing 348 Jewish prisoners.
- 1944 – World War II: The Nazis begin a week-long massacre of between 40,000 and 50,000 civilians and prisoners of war in Wola, Poland.
- 1949 – In Ecuador, an earthquake destroys 50 towns and kills more than 6,000.
- 1949 – In Montana, 12 smokejumper firefighters and a US Forest Service fire guard are killed in the Mann Gulch Fire.
- 1957 – American Bandstand, a show dedicated to the teenage "baby-boomers" by playing the songs and showing popular dances of the time, debuts on the ABC television network.
- 1960 – Burkina Faso, then known as Upper Volta, becomes independent from France.
- 1962 – Apartheid: Nelson Mandela is jailed. He would not be released until 1990.
- 1962 – American actress Marilyn Monroe is found dead at her home from a drug overdose.
- 1963 – Cold War: The United States, the United Kingdom, and the Soviet Union sign the Partial Nuclear Test Ban Treaty.
- 1964 – Vietnam War: Operation Pierce Arrow: American aircraft from carriers USS Ticonderoga and USS Constellation bomb North Vietnam in retaliation for strikes against U.S. destroyers in the Gulf of Tonkin.
- 1965 – The Indo-Pakistani war of 1965 begins as Pakistani soldiers cross the Line of Control dressed as locals.
- 1966 – A group of red guards at Experimental High in Beijing, including Deng Rong and Liu Pingping, daughters of Deng Xiaoping and Liu Shaoqi respectively, beat the deputy vice principal, Bian Zhongyun, to death with sticks after accusing her of counter-revolutionary revisionism, producing one of the first fatalities of the Cultural Revolution.
- 1969 – The Lonesome Cowboys police raid occurs in Atlanta, Georgia, leading to the creation of the Georgia Gay Liberation Front.
- 1971 – The first Pacific Islands Forum (then known as the "South Pacific Forum") is held in Wellington, New Zealand, with the aim of enhancing cooperation between the independent countries of the Pacific Ocean.
- 1973 – Mars 6 is launched from the USSR.
- 1974 – Watergate scandal: President Richard Nixon, under orders of the US Supreme Court, releases the "Smoking Gun" tape, recorded on June 23, 1972, clearly revealing his actions in covering up and interfering investigations into the break-in. His political support vanishes completely.
- 1979 – In Afghanistan, Maoists undertake the Bala Hissar uprising against the Leninist government.
- 1981 – President Ronald Reagan fires 11,359 striking air-traffic controllers who ignored his order for them to return to work.
- 1984 – A Biman Bangladesh Airlines Fokker F27 Friendship crashes on approach to Zia International Airport, in Dhaka, Bangladesh, killing all 49 people on board.
- 1995 – Yugoslav Wars: The city of Knin, Croatia, a significant Serb stronghold, is taken by Croatian forces during Operation Storm. The date is celebrated in Croatia as Victory Day.
- 2003 – A car bomb explodes in the Indonesian capital of Jakarta outside the Marriott Hotel killing 12 and injuring 150.
- 2008 – The New England Revolution win the 2008 North American SuperLiga final against the Houston Dynamo.
- 2010 – The Copiapó mining accident occurs, trapping 33 Chilean miners approximately 2,300 ft (700 m) below the ground for 69 days.
- 2010 – Ten members of International Assistance Mission Nuristan Eye Camp team are killed by persons unknown in Kuran wa Munjan District of Badakhshan Province, Afghanistan.
- 2012 – The Wisconsin Sikh temple shooting took place in Oak Creek, Wisconsin, killing six victims; the perpetrator committed suicide after being wounded by police.
- 2015 – The Environmental Protection Agency at Gold King Mine waste water spill releases three million gallons of heavy metal toxin tailings and waste water into the Animas River in Colorado.
- 2019 – The revocation of the special status of Jammu and Kashmir (state) occurred and the state was bifurcated into two union territories (Jammu and Kashmir (union territory) and Ladakh).
- 2021 – Australia's second most populous state Victoria enters its sixth COVID-19 lockdown, enacting stage four restrictions statewide in reaction to six new COVID-19 cases recorded that morning.
- 2024 – Following the non-cooperation movement against the government of Bangladesh, Bangladeshi prime minister Sheikh Hasina resigns and flees the country, ending her rule of 15 consecutive years and a total of almost two decades. The date is also known as 36 July.

== Births ==
=== Pre-1600 ===
- 79 BC – Tullia, Roman daughter of Cicero (died 45 BC)
- 1262 – Ladislaus IV of Hungary (died 1290)
- 1301 – Edmund of Woodstock, 1st Earl of Kent, English politician, Lord Warden of the Cinque Ports (died 1330)
- 1397 – Guillaume Du Fay, Belgian-Italian composer and theorist (died 1474)
- 1461 – Alexander Jagiellon, Polish king (died 1506)
- 1540 – Joseph Justus Scaliger, French philologist and historian (died 1609)

=== 1601–1900 ===
- 1607 – Antonio Barberini, Italian cardinal (died 1671)
- 1623 – Antonio Cesti, Italian organist and composer (died 1669)
- 1626 – Richard Ottley, English politician (died 1670)
- 1662 – James Anderson, Scottish lawyer and historian (died 1728)
- 1681 – Vitus Bering, Danish-born Russian explorer (died 1741)
- 1694 – Leonardo Leo, Italian composer (died 1744)
- 1749 – Thomas Lynch Jr., American commander and politician (died 1779)
- 1797 – Friedrich August Kummer, German cellist and composer (died 1879)
- 1802 – Niels Henrik Abel, Norwegian mathematician and theorist (died 1829)
- 1811 – Ambroise Thomas, French composer (died 1896)
- 1813 – Ivar Aasen, Norwegian poet and linguist (died 1896)
- 1815 – Edward John Eyre, English explorer and politician, Governor of Jamaica (died 1901)
- 1827 – Deodoro da Fonseca, Brazilian field marshal and politician, 1st President of Brazil (died 1892)
- 1828 – Louise of the Netherlands (died 1871)
- 1833 – Carola of Vasa (died 1907)
- 1843 – James Scott Skinner, Scottish violinist and composer (died 1927)
- 1844 – Ilya Repin, Russian painter and sculptor (died 1930)
- 1850 – Guy de Maupassant, French short story writer, novelist, and poet (died 1893)
- 1860 – Louis Wain, English artist (died 1939)
- 1862 – Joseph Merrick, English man with severe deformities (died 1890)
- 1866 – Carl Harries, German chemist and academic (died 1923)
- 1866 – Harry Trott, Australian cricketer (died 1917)
- 1868 – Oskar Merikanto, Finnish pianist and composer (died 1924)
- 1872 – Oswaldo Cruz, Brazilian physician, bacteriologist, and epidemiologist, founded the Oswaldo Cruz Foundation (died 1917)
- 1874 – Wesley Clair Mitchell, American economist and academic (died 1948)
- 1874 – Horace Rawlins, English golfer (died 1935)
- 1876 – Mary Ritter Beard, American historian and activist (died 1958)
- 1877 – Tom Thomson, Canadian painter (died 1917)
- 1880 – Gertrude Rush, American lawyer and jurist (died 1962)
- 1880 – Ruth Sawyer, American author and educator (died 1970)
- 1882 – Anne Acheson, Irish sculptor (died 1962)
- 1887 – Reginald Owen, English-American actor and singer (died 1972)
- 1889 – Conrad Aiken, American novelist, short story writer, critic, and poet (died 1973)
- 1890 – Naum Gabo, Russian-American sculptor (died 1977)
- 1890 – Erich Kleiber, Austrian conductor and director (died 1956)
- 1897 – Roberta Dodd Crawford, American soprano and educator (died 1954)
- 1897 – Aksel Larsen, Danish lawyer and politician (died 1972)
- 1900 – Rudolf Schottlaender, German philosopher, classical philologist and translator (died 1988)

=== 1901–present ===
- 1901 – Claude Autant-Lara, French director, screenwriter, and politician (died 2000)
- 1904 – Kenneth V. Thimann, English-American botanist and microbiologist (died 1997)
- 1905 – Wassily Leontief, German-American economist and academic, Nobel Prize laureate (died 1999)
- 1906 – Joan Hickson, English actress (died 1998)
- 1906 – John Huston, American actor, director, and screenwriter (died 1987)
- 1908 – Harold Holt, Australian lawyer and politician, 17th Prime Minister of Australia (died 1967)
- 1908 – Jose Garcia Villa, Filipino short story writer and poet (died 1997)
- 1910 – Bruno Coquatrix, French songwriter and manager (died 1979)
- 1910 – Herminio Masantonio, Argentinian footballer (died 1956)
- 1911 – Robert Taylor, American actor and singer (died 1969)
- 1912 – Abbé Pierre, French priest and humanitarian (died 2007)
- 1914 – Parley Baer, American actor (died 2002)
- 1916 – Peter Viereck, American poet and academic (died 2006)
- 1918 – Tom Drake, American actor and singer (died 1982)
- 1918 – Betty Oliphant, English-Canadian ballerina, co-founded Canada's National Ballet School (died 2004)
- 1919 – Rosalind Hicks, British literary guardian and the only child of author, Agatha Christie (died 2004)
- 1920 – George Tooker, American painter and academic (died 2011)
- 1921 – Terry Becker, American actor, director, and producer (died 2014)
- 1922 – L. Tom Perry, American businessman and religious leader (died 2015)
- 1922 – Frank Stranahan, American golfer (died 2013)
- 1923 – Devan Nair, Malaysian-Singaporean union leader and politician, 3rd President of Singapore (died 2005)
- 1926 – Betsy Jolas, French composer
- 1926 – Jeri Southern, American jazz singer and pianist (died 1991)
- 1929 – Don Matheson, American soldier, police officer, and actor (died 2014)
- 1929 – John H. Moore II, American lawyer and judge (died 2013)
- 1930 – Neil Armstrong, American pilot, engineer, and astronaut, first man to walk on the Moon (died 2012)
- 1930 – Damita Jo DeBlanc, American comedian, actress, and singer (died 1998)
- 1930 – Richie Ginther, American race car driver (died 1989)
- 1930 – Michal Kováč, Slovak lawyer and politician, 1st President of Slovakia (died 2016)
- 1931 – Tom Hafey, Australian footballer and coach (died 2014)
- 1932 – Tera de Marez Oyens, Dutch pianist and composer (died 1996)
- 1932 – Vladimir Fedoseyev, Russian conductor
- 1934 – Karl Johan Åström, Swedish engineer and theorist
- 1934 – Wendell Berry, American novelist, short story writer, poet, and essayist (died 2026)
- 1934 – Gay Byrne, Irish radio and television host (died 2019)
- 1934 – Vern Gosdin, American country singer (died 2009)
- 1935 – Michael Ballhaus, German director and cinematographer (died 2017)
- 1935 – Peter Inge, Baron Inge, English field marshal (died 2022)
- 1935 – Roy Benavidez, American soldier, Medal of Honor Winner (died 1998)
- 1936 – Nikolai Baturin, Estonian author and playwright (died 2019)
- 1936 – John Saxon, American actor (died 2020)
- 1937 – Herb Brooks, American ice hockey player and coach (died 2003)
- 1937 – Brian G. Marsden, English-American astronomer and academic (died 2010)
- 1939 – Roger Clark, English race car driver (died 1998)
- 1939 – Carmen Salinas, Mexican actress and politician (died 2021)
- 1940 – Bobby Braddock, American country music songwriter, musician, and producer
- 1940 – Roman Gabriel, American football player, coach, and actor (died 2024)
- 1940 – Rick Huxley, English bass player (died 2013)
- 1941 – Bob Clark, American director, producer, and screenwriter (died 2007)
- 1941 – Leonid Kizim, Ukrainian general, pilot, and astronaut (died 2010)
- 1941 – Airto Moreira, Brazilian-American drummer and composer
- 1942 – Joe Boyd, American record producer, founded Hannibal Records
- 1943 – Nelson Briles, American baseball player (died 2005)
- 1943 – Sammi Smith, American country music singer-songwriter (died 2005)
- 1944 – Christopher Gunning, English composer (died 2023)
- 1945 – Loni Anderson, American actress (died 2025)
- 1946 – Bruce Coslet, American football player and coach
- 1946 – Shirley Ann Jackson, American physicist
- 1946 – Rick van der Linden, Dutch keyboard player and songwriter (died 2006)
- 1946 – Bob McCarthy, Australian rugby league player and coach
- 1946 – Erika Slezak, American actress
- 1946 – Xavier Trias, Spanish pediatrician and politician, 118th Mayor of Barcelona
- 1947 – Angry Anderson, Australian singer and actor (died 2026)
- 1947 – Bernie Carbo, American baseball player
- 1947 – France A. Córdova, American astrophysicist and academic
- 1947 – Rick Derringer, American singer-songwriter, guitarist, and producer (died 2025)
- 1947 – Greg Leskiw, Canadian guitarist and songwriter
- 1948 – Ray Clemence, English footballer and manager (died 2020)
- 1948 – Barbara Flynn, English actress
- 1948 – David Hungate, American bass guitarist, producer, and arranger
- 1948 – Shin Takamatsu, Japanese architect and academic
- 1950 – Luiz Gushiken, Brazilian trade union leader and politician (died 2013)
- 1950 – Mahendra Karma, Indian lawyer and politician (died 2013)
- 1951 – Samantha Sang, Australian pop singer
- 1952 – Tamás Faragó, Hungarian water polo player
- 1952 – John Jarratt, Australian actor and producer
- 1952 – Louis Walsh, Irish talent manager
- 1953 – Rick Mahler, American baseball player and coach (died 2005)
- 1955 – Eddie Ojeda, American guitarist and songwriter
- 1956 – Christopher Chessun, English Anglican bishop
- 1956 – Jerry Ciccoritti, Canadian actor, director, producer, and screenwriter
- 1956 – Maureen McCormick, American actress
- 1957 – Larry Corowa, Australian rugby league player
- 1957 – David Gill, English businessman
- 1958 – Ulla Salzgeber, German equestrian
- 1959 – Pete Burns, English singer-songwriter (died 2016)
- 1959 – Pat Smear, American guitarist and songwriter
- 1960 – David Baldacci, American lawyer and author
- 1961 – Janet McTeer, English actress
- 1961 – Athula Samarasekera, Sri Lankan cricketer and coach
- 1961 – Mark O'Connor, American violinist/fiddler and composer
- 1961 – Tim Wilson, American comedian, singer-songwriter, and guitarist (died 2014)
- 1962 – Patrick Ewing, Jamaican-American basketball player and coach
- 1962 – Otis Thorpe, American basketball player
- 1963 – Steve Lee, Swiss singer-songwriter (died 2010)
- 1963 – Ingmar De Vos, Belgian sports administrator
- 1963 – Mark Strong, English actor
- 1964 – Rory Morrison, English journalist (died 2013)
- 1964 – Adam Yauch, American rapper and director (died 2012)
- 1965 – Jeff Coffin, American saxophonist and composer
- 1965 – Motoi Sakuraba, Japanese keyboard player and composer
- 1966 – James Gunn, American filmmaker
- 1966 – Jennifer Finch, American singer, bass player, and photographer (died 2026)
- 1966 – Jonathan Silverman, American actor and producer
- 1967 – Matthew Caws, American singer-songwriter and guitarist
- 1967 – Vladyslav Gorai, Ukrainian tenor
- 1968 – Terri Clark, Canadian singer-songwriter and guitarist
- 1968 – Funkmaster Flex, American DJ, radio and television host, rapper, and record producer
- 1968 – Kendo Kashin, Japanese wrestler and mixed martial artist
- 1968 – Marine Le Pen, French lawyer and politician
- 1968 – Oleh Luzhnyi, Ukrainian footballer and manager
- 1968 – Colin McRae, Scottish race car driver (died 2007)
- 1968 – John Olerud, American baseball player
- 1969 – Jackie Doyle-Price, English politician
- 1969 – Vasbert Drakes, Barbadian cricketer
- 1969 – Venkatesh Prasad, Indian cricketer and coach
- 1969 – Rob Scott, Australian rower
- 1971 – Valdis Dombrovskis, Latvian academic and politician, 11th Prime Minister of Latvia
- 1972 – Ikuto Hidaka, Japanese wrestler
- 1972 – Aaqib Javed, Pakistani cricketer and coach
- 1972 – Darren Shahlavi, English-American actor and martial artist (died 2015)
- 1972 – Jon Sleightholme, English rugby player
- 1972 – Theodore Whitmore, Jamaican footballer and manager
- 1972 – Christian Olde Wolbers, Belgian-American guitarist, songwriter, and producer
- 1973 – Paul Carige, Australian rugby league player
- 1973 – Justin Marshall, New Zealand rugby player and sportscaster
- 1974 – Alvin Ceccoli, Australian footballer
- 1974 – Kajol, Indian film actress
- 1974 – Olle Kullinger, Swedish footballer
- 1974 – Antoine Sibierski, French footballer
- 1975 – Dan Hipgrave, English guitarist and journalist
- 1975 – Josep Jufré, Spanish cyclist
- 1975 – Eicca Toppinen, Finnish cellist and composer
- 1976 – Jeff Friesen, Canadian ice hockey player
- 1976 – Marians Pahars, Latvian footballer and manager
- 1976 – Remi Sølvberg, Norwegian politician
- 1976 – Eugen Trică, Romanian footballer and manager
- 1977 – Eric Hinske, American baseball player and coach
- 1977 – Mark Mulder, American baseball player and sportscaster
- 1977 – Michael Walsh, English footballer
- 1978 – Cosmin Bărcăuan, Romanian footballer and manager
- 1978 – Kim Gevaert, Belgian sprinter
- 1978 – Harel Levy, Israeli tennis player
- 1979 – David Healy, Irish footballer
- 1980 – Wayne Bridge, English footballer
- 1980 – Salvador Cabañas, Paraguayan footballer
- 1980 – Jason Culina, Australian footballer
- 1980 – Jesse Williams, American actor, director, producer, and political activist
- 1981 – David Clarke, English ice hockey player
- 1981 – Carl Crawford, American baseball player
- 1981 – Maik Franz, German footballer
- 1981 – Erik Guay, Canadian skier
- 1981 – Travie McCoy, American rapper, singer, and songwriter
- 1981 – Anna Rawson, Australian golfer
- 1981 – Rachel Scott, American murder victim, inspired the Rachel's Challenge (died 1999)
- 1982 – Jamie Houston, English-German rugby player
- 1982 – Lolo Jones, American hurdler
- 1982 – Michele Pazienza, Italian footballer
- 1982 – Jeff Robson, Australian rugby league player
- 1982 – Pete Sell, American mixed martial artist
- 1984 – Steve Matai, New Zealand rugby league player
- 1985 – Laurent Ciman, Belgian footballer
- 1985 – Salomon Kalou, Ivorian footballer
- 1985 – Gil Vermouth, Israeli footballer
- 1985 – Erkan Zengin, Swedish footballer
- 1986 – Paula Creamer, American golfer
- 1986 – Kathrin Zettel, Austrian skier
- 1987 – Orce Gjorgjievski, Macedonian politician
- 1988 – Michael Jamieson, Scottish-English swimmer
- 1988 – Federica Pellegrini, Italian swimmer
- 1989 – Ryan Bertrand, English footballer
- 1989 – Mathieu Manset, French footballer
- 1991 – Esteban Gutiérrez, Mexican race car driver
- 1991 – Wi Ha-joon, South Korean actor
- 1991 – Konrad Hurrell, Tongan rugby league player
- 1991 – Daniëlle van de Donk, Dutch footballer
- 1991 – Andreas Weimann, Austrian footballer
- 1994 – Natalia García, Spanish rhythmic gymnast
- 1995 – Pierre-Emile Højbjerg, Danish footballer
- 1996 – Takakeishō Mitsunobu, Japanese sumo wrestler
- 1996 – Cho Seung-youn, South Korean singer-songwriter and rapper
- 1997 – Jack Cogger, Australian rugby league player
- 1997 – Olivia Holt, American actress and singer
- 1997 – Wang Yibo, Chinese dancer, singer and actor
- 1997 – Yungblud, English musician and actor
- 1998 – Adam Doueihi, Australian-Lebanese rugby league player
- 1999 – Kim Si-hyeon, South Korean singer
- 2000 – Tom Gilbert, Australian rugby league player
- 2001 – Anthony Edwards, American basketball player
- 2003 – Toni Shaw, British Paralympic swimmer
- 2004 – Gavi, Spanish footballer
- 2008 – Hudson Meek, American actor (died 2024)

== Deaths ==
=== Pre-1600 ===
- 553 – Xiao Ji, prince of the Liang dynasty (born 508)
- 642 – Eowa, king of Mercia
- 642 – Oswald, king of Northumbria
- 824 – Heizei, Japanese emperor (born 773)
- 877 – Ubayd Allah ibn Yahya ibn Khaqan, Abbasid vizier
- 882 – Louis III, Frankish king (born 863)
- 890 – Ranulf II, duke of Aquitaine (born 850)
- 910 – Eowils and Halfdan, joint kings of Northumbria
- 910 – Ingwær, king of Northumbria
- 917 – Euthymius I of Constantinople (born 834)
- 940 – Li Decheng, Chinese general (born 863)
- 1063 – Gruffydd ap Llywelyn, King of Gwynedd
- 1364 – Kōgon, Japanese emperor (born 1313)
- 1415 – Richard of Conisburgh, 3rd Earl of Cambridge (born 1375)
- 1415 – Henry Scrope, 3rd Baron Scrope of Masham (born 1370)
- 1447 – John Holland, 2nd Duke of Exeter (born 1395)
- 1579 – Stanislaus Hosius, Polish cardinal (born 1504)
- 1600 – John Ruthven, 3rd Earl of Gowrie, Scottish conspirator (born 1577)

=== 1601–1900 ===
- 1610 – Alonso García de Ramón, Spanish soldier and politician, Royal Governor of Chile (born 1552)
- 1633 – George Abbot, English archbishop and academic (born 1562)
- 1678 – Juan García de Zéspedes, Mexican tenor and composer (born 1619)
- 1729 – Thomas Newcomen, English engineer, invented the eponymous Newcomen atmospheric engine (born 1664)
- 1743 – John Hervey, 2nd Baron Hervey, English courtier and politician, Vice-Chamberlain of the Household (born 1696)
- 1778 – Charles Clémencet, French historian and author (born 1703)
- 1778 – Thomas Linley the younger, English composer (born 1756)
- 1792 – Frederick North, Lord North, English politician, Prime Minister of Great Britain (born 1732)
- 1799 – Richard Howe, 1st Earl Howe, English admiral and politician (born 1726)
- 1868 – Jacques Boucher de Crèvecœur de Perthes, French archaeologist and historian (born 1788)
- 1877 – Robert Williams (known as Trebor Mai), Welsh poet (born 1830)
- 1880 – Ferdinand Ritter von Hebra, Austrian physician and dermatologist (born 1816)
- 1881 – Spotted Tail, American tribal chief (born 1823)
- 1895 – Friedrich Engels, German philosopher (born 1820)

=== 1901–present ===
- 1901 – Victoria, German Empress and Princess Royal of the United Kingdom (born 1840)
- 1904 – George Dibbs, Australian politician, 10th Premier of New South Wales (born 1834)
- 1911 – Bob Caruthers, American baseball player and umpire (born 1864)
- 1916 – George Butterworth, British composer (born 1885)
- 1921 – Dimitrios Rallis, Greek lawyer and politician, 78th Prime Minister of Greece (born 1844)
- 1929 – Millicent Fawcett, English trade union leader and activist (born 1847)
- 1933 – Charles Harold Davis, American painter and academic (born 1856)
- 1935 – David Townsend, American art director and set designer (born 1891)
- 1939 – Béla Jankovich, Hungarian economist and politician, Minister of Education of Hungary (born 1865)
- 1944 – Maurice Turnbull, Welsh cricketer and rugby player (born 1906)
- 1946 – Wilhelm Marx, German lawyer and politician, 17th Chancellor of Germany (born 1863)
- 1948 – Montagu Toller, English cricketer and lawyer (born 1871)
- 1952 – Sameera Moussa, Egyptian physicist and academic (born 1917)
- 1955 – Carmen Miranda, Portuguese-Brazilian actress and singer (born 1909)
- 1957 – Heinrich Otto Wieland, German chemist and academic, Nobel Prize laureate (born 1877)
- 1959 – Edgar Guest, English-American journalist and poet (born 1881)
- 1960 – Arthur Meighen, Canadian lawyer and politician, 9th Prime Minister of Canada (born 1874)
- 1963 – Salvador Bacarisse, Spanish composer (born 1898)
- 1964 – Moa Martinson, Swedish author (born 1890)
- 1964 – Art Ross, Canadian-American ice hockey player and coach (born 1886)
- 1968 – Luther Perkins, American guitarist (born 1928)
- 1978 – Jesse Haines, American baseball player and coach (born 1893)
- 1980 – Harold L. Runnels, American soldier and politician (born 1924)
- 1983 – Judy Canova, American actress and comedian (born 1913)
- 1983 – Joan Robinson, English economist and author (born 1903)
- 1984 – Richard Burton, Welsh actor (born 1925)
- 1985 – Arnold Horween, American football player and coach (born 1898)
- 1987 – Georg Gaßmann, German politician, Mayor of Marburg (born 1910)
- 1991 – Paul Brown, American football player and coach (born 1908)
- 1991 – Soichiro Honda, Japanese engineer and businessman, founded Honda (born 1906)
- 1992 – Robert Muldoon, New Zealand politician, 31st Prime Minister of New Zealand (born 1921)
- 1994 – Menachem Avidom, Israeli composer (born 1908)
- 1994 – Alain de Changy, Belgian race car driver (born 1922)
- 1998 – Otto Kretschmer, German naval officer and submariner (born 1912)
- 1998 – Todor Zhivkov, Bulgarian commander and politician, 36th Prime Minister of Bulgaria (born 1911)
- 2000 – Otto Buchsbaum, Austrian-Brazilian journalist and activist (born 1920)
- 2000 – Tullio Crali, Montenegrin-Italian pilot and painter (born 1910)
- 2000 – Lala Amarnath, Indian cricketer (born 1911)
- 2000 – Alec Guinness, English actor (born 1914)
- 2001 – Otema Allimadi, Ugandan politician, 2nd Prime Minister of Uganda (born 1929)
- 2001 – Christopher Skase, Australian-Spanish businessman (born 1948)
- 2002 – Josh Ryan Evans, American actor (born 1982)
- 2002 – Chick Hearn, American sportscaster (born 1916)
- 2002 – Franco Lucentini, Italian journalist and author (born 1920)
- 2002 – Darrell Porter, American baseball player (born 1952)
- 2002 – Matt Robinson, American actor, producer, and screenwriter (born 1937)
- 2005 – Polina Astakhova, Russian gymnast and coach (born 1936)
- 2005 – Jim O'Hora, American football player and coach (born 1915)
- 2005 – Raul Roco, Filipino lawyer and politician, 31st Filipino Secretary of Education (born 1941)
- 2005 – Eddie Jenkins, Welsh footballer (born 1909)
- 2007 – Jean-Marie Lustiger, French cardinal (born 1926)
- 2007 – Florian Pittiș, Romanian actor, singer, director, and producer (born 1943)
- 2008 – Neil Bartlett, English-American chemist and academic (born 1932)
- 2008 – Reg Lindsay, Australian singer-songwriter, guitarist, and producer (born 1929)
- 2009 – Budd Schulberg, American author, screenwriter, and producer (born 1914)
- 2011 – Andrzej Lepper, Polish farmer and politician, Deputy Prime Minister of Poland (born 1954)
- 2011 – Aziz Shavershian, Australian bodybuilder (born 1989)
- 2012 – Erwin Axer, Polish director and screenwriter (born 1917)
- 2012 – Michel Daerden, Belgian lawyer and politician (born 1949)
- 2012 – Fred Matua, American football player (born 1984)
- 2012 – Martin E. Segal, Russian-American businessman, co-founded Film Society of Lincoln Center (born 1916)
- 2012 – Chavela Vargas, Costa Rican-Mexican singer-songwriter and actress (born 1919)
- 2012 – Roland Charles Wagner, French author and translator (born 1960)
- 2013 – Ruth Asawa, American sculptor and educator (born 1926)
- 2013 – Shawn Burr, Canadian-American ice hockey player (born 1966)
- 2013 – Willie Dunn, Canadian singer-songwriter and producer (born 1942)
- 2013 – Roy Rubin, American basketball player and coach (born 1925)
- 2013 – May Song Vang, American activist (born 1951)
- 2013 – Rob Wyda, American commander and judge (born 1959)
- 2014 – Harold J. Greene, American general (born 1962)
- 2014 – Vladimir Orlov, Russian author (born 1936)
- 2014 – Chapman Pincher, Indian-English historian, journalist, and author (born 1914)
- 2014 – Jesse Leonard Steinfeld, American physician and academic, 11th Surgeon General of the United States (born 1927)
- 2015 – Arthur Walter James, English journalist and politician (born 1912)
- 2015 – Tony Millington, Welsh footballer (born 1943)
- 2018 – Alan Rabinowitz, American zoologist (born 1953)
- 2019 – Toni Morrison, American author, Pulitzer Prize winner, and Nobel laureate (born 1931).
- 2020 – Hawa Abdi, Somali human rights activist and physician (born 1947)
- 2022 – Judith Durham, Australian singer-songwriter (born 1943)
- 2022 – Cherie Gil, Filipino actress (born 1963)
- 2022 – Ali Haydar, Syrian army officer (born 1932)
- 2022 – Issey Miyake, Japanese fashion designer (born 1938)
- 2022 – Dillon Quirke, Irish hurler (born 1998)
- 2025 – Col Joye, Australian singer-songwriter and guitarist (born 1937)

== Holidays and observances ==
- Christian feast day:
  - Abel of Reims
  - Addai
  - Afra
  - Cassian of Autun
  - Dedication of the Basilica of St Mary Major (Catholic Church)
  - Emygdius
  - Margaret the Barefooted
  - Memnius
  - Nonna of Nazianzus
  - Oswald of Northumbria
  - August 5 (Eastern Orthodox liturgics)
- Independence Day (Burkina Faso)
- July Mass Uprising Day (Bangladesh)
- Victory and Homeland Thanksgiving Day and the Day of Croatian defenders (Croatia)
