= O Priya Tumi Kothay =

O Priya Tumi Kothay may refer to:

- O Priya Tumi Kothay (song), a Bengali song by Asif Akbar
- O Priya Tumi Kothay (album), a 2001 album by Asif Akbar
- O Priya Tumi Kothay (film), a 2002 film featuring Shakib Khan
