= Atik Hasan =

Bangladeshi singer

Atik Hasan আতিক হাসান
- Born: 10 February; Chittagong, Bangladesh
- Genre: Pop
- Occupation: Musician
- Years active: 1993–present
- Labels: G-Series; Soundtek
- Spouse: Afroza Naznin

Atik Hasan (born 10 February) is a Bangladeshi singer. He is known for his Bengali songs, which were popular in Bangladesh during the early 2000s and are available on digital music platforms.

== Early life and education ==
Hasan was born on 10 February in Bangladesh to Rafiqul Islam and Sahana Begum. He completed his schooling at Muslim High School and later pursued higher education at Government Hazi Mohammad Mohsin College, Chittagong

== Career and works ==
Atik Hasan began his music career in 1998. He released his first solo album Madhobi Ki Chilo Go Bhul and gained attention with several popular songs in the Bangla music scene. He put out about 14 singles, including Madhobi Ki Chilo Go Bhul, Jokhon Shudhu Mone Pore Tomake and Bojhoni Bhul Kore Konodin which were well received by listeners. This album wrote and composed by Ethun Babu.

By 2012, Atik Hasan released 14 solo albums. He collaborated on Bengali duet albums with Kumar Sanu (2004) and Sonu Nigam (2005), as well as with Andrew Kishore, Monir Khan, S D Rubel, and Asif Akbar. He also worked extensively as a playback singer in films. He became known for his emotional and melodic style, which appealed to audiences in the audio-CD era of Bangladeshi music. After a period of reduced releases, he continued to create music and plan new projects. Some of his music has been published on digital platforms such as Apple Music, which lists singles like Abhishap Dibo Na (2025) and Bishwas Korechhilam Tomake (2026).

Atik Hasan's songs are primarily in the Bengali language and often focus on themes of love, loss and emotional reflection. His style blends traditional Bangla melodies with modern recording techniques. Some of his recordings, such as Madhobi Ki Chilo Go Bhul, remain popular among listeners who enjoy classic Bangla songs. He began his playback singing career with the film Premik Dakat (2000), directed by D. H. Badal Khan. He later recorded songs for around 50 films.

== Album ==
- Madhobi Ki Chilo Go Bhul (2002)
- Abhishap Dibo Na (2025)
- Bishwas Korechhilam Tomake (2026).
