= Ethun Babu =

Bangladeshi music composer

- Born: 16 November 1963 (age 62); Rajshahi
- Occupation: Musician
- Years active: 1990-present

Ethun Babu (born 16 November 1963) is a Bangladeshi songwriter, lyricist and musician. He is best known for writing lyrics and composing music for popular Bangla songs and protest music in Bangladesh. He has worked with many singers and his songs have become well known in Bangladeshi music culture including Asif Akbar, Atik Hasan, Janes Sumon, Momtaz Begum.

== Early life ==
Babu was born on 16 November 1963 in Rajshahi, Bangladesh. He grew up with a passion for music and started his career as a songwriter and composer.

== Career and works ==
Ethun Babu began his professional music career in the 1990s. He has written and composed many songs that became hits in Bangladesh. One of his early successes was the song "O Priya Tumi Kothay", performed by singer Asif Akbar, which became widely popular. In 2002, Babu wrote and composed 12 songs for the album Ekta Chador Hobe, performed by Janes Sumon. The album attracted attention from music listeners at the time. He has also written and composed other songs including Ghum Ashe na, Madhobi Ki Chhilo Vul, and Kokhono Valobashoni.

In recent years, He composed the protest song "Deshta Tomar Baper Naki", performed by Moushumi Chowdhury. The song became well known for its use in public protests in Bangladesh. He has worked with many artists, such as singer Janes Sumon and Bijoy Mamun. Babu has written lyrics and arranged music for their songs released through his YouTube channel EB Music.

== Album ==
- O Priya Tumi Kothay
- Ekta Chador Hobe
- Madhobi Ki Chhilo Vul
- Kokhono Valobashoni
- Mone Rekho
- Gum Ase na
- Priya Kase Nai
- Chandana
- Priya Tomar Mon Bole Kesu Nei
- Khoma Kore Dew
- Boro Betha Dele Anjana
- Mone Mone Mon
- Se Cilo Amar Priyotoma
- Birosher Prem
- Mon Nodi
- Sukhe Theke Valo Theko
- Madhobi Dukkho Debo Koto
- Poran
- Ak Fali Rod
