= Awaaz Utha =

2024 Bangladeshi hip hop protest song by Hannan Hossain Shimul

Song by Hannan Hossain Shimul
- Language: Bengali
- Released: 18 July 2024
- Recorded: 2024
- Genre: Hip hop
- Length: 2:36
- Label: Killaz Kulture
- Songwriter: Hannan Hossain Shimul
- Composer: Hannan Hossain Shimul
- Producer: Samir Islam
External audio
- "Awaaz Utha" on YouTube

"Awaaz Utha" (Bengali: আওয়াজ উডা, lit. 'Raise the voice') is a Bangladeshi hip hop protest song composed in the context of the July revolution, written, and voiced by Hannan Hossain Shimul and produced, composed, mixed and mastered by SnareByt.

The song released during the quota reform movement in Bangladesh. The song's composer, Hannan, was arrested by the police on 25 July from Narayanganj, a week after the release of the song. New York-based non-profit organisation Artist at Risk Connection (ARC) condemned the arrest.

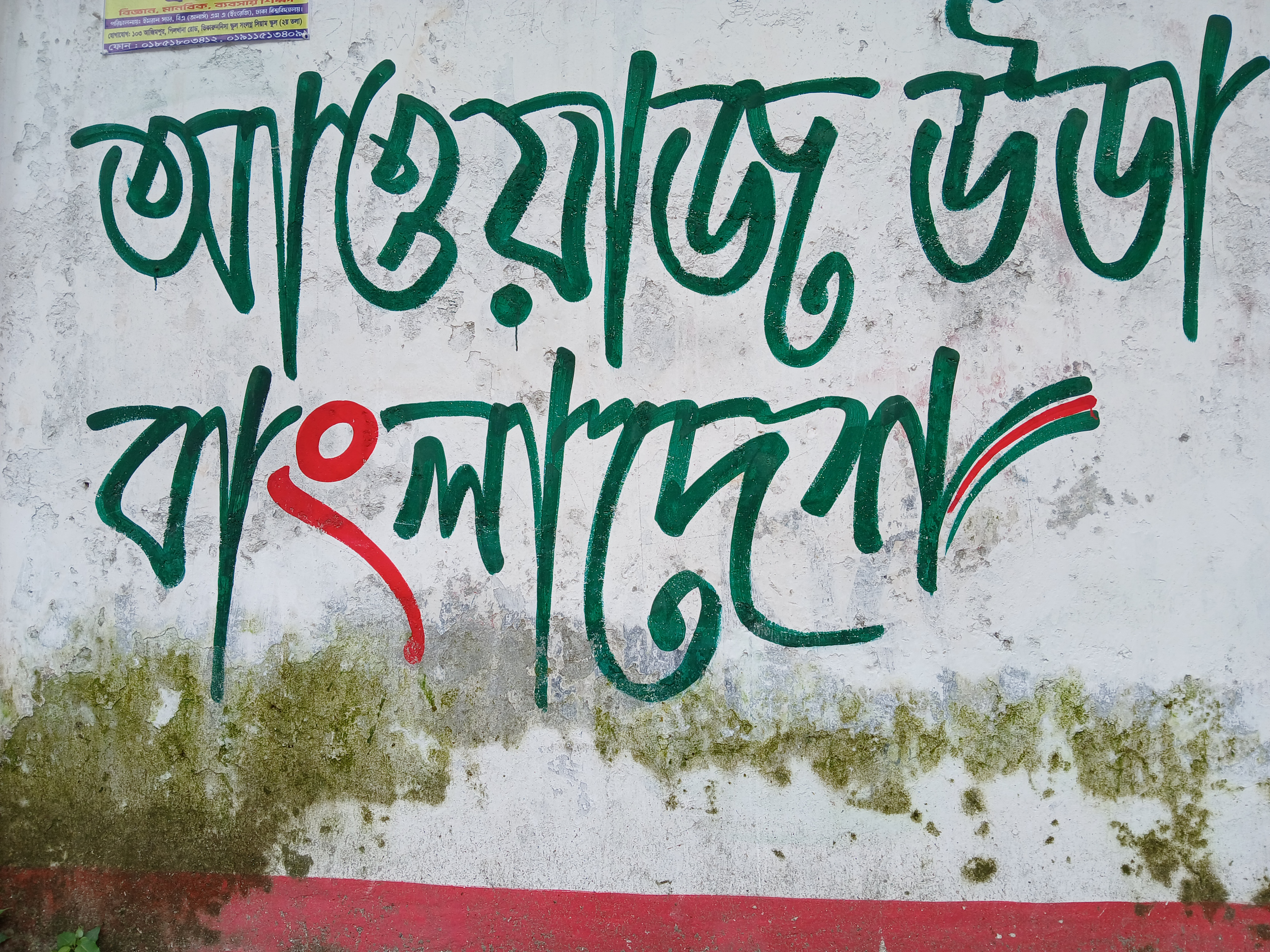
A Bengali graffiti of Awaaz Utha at the Eden College, Dhaka

The song became very popular with the audience around the quota reform movement. In just 13 days, it received over six million views on YouTube, making it the fifth most trending song on YouTube in Bangladesh. Hannan later performed the song in the "Spirits of July" concert on 21 December 2024.

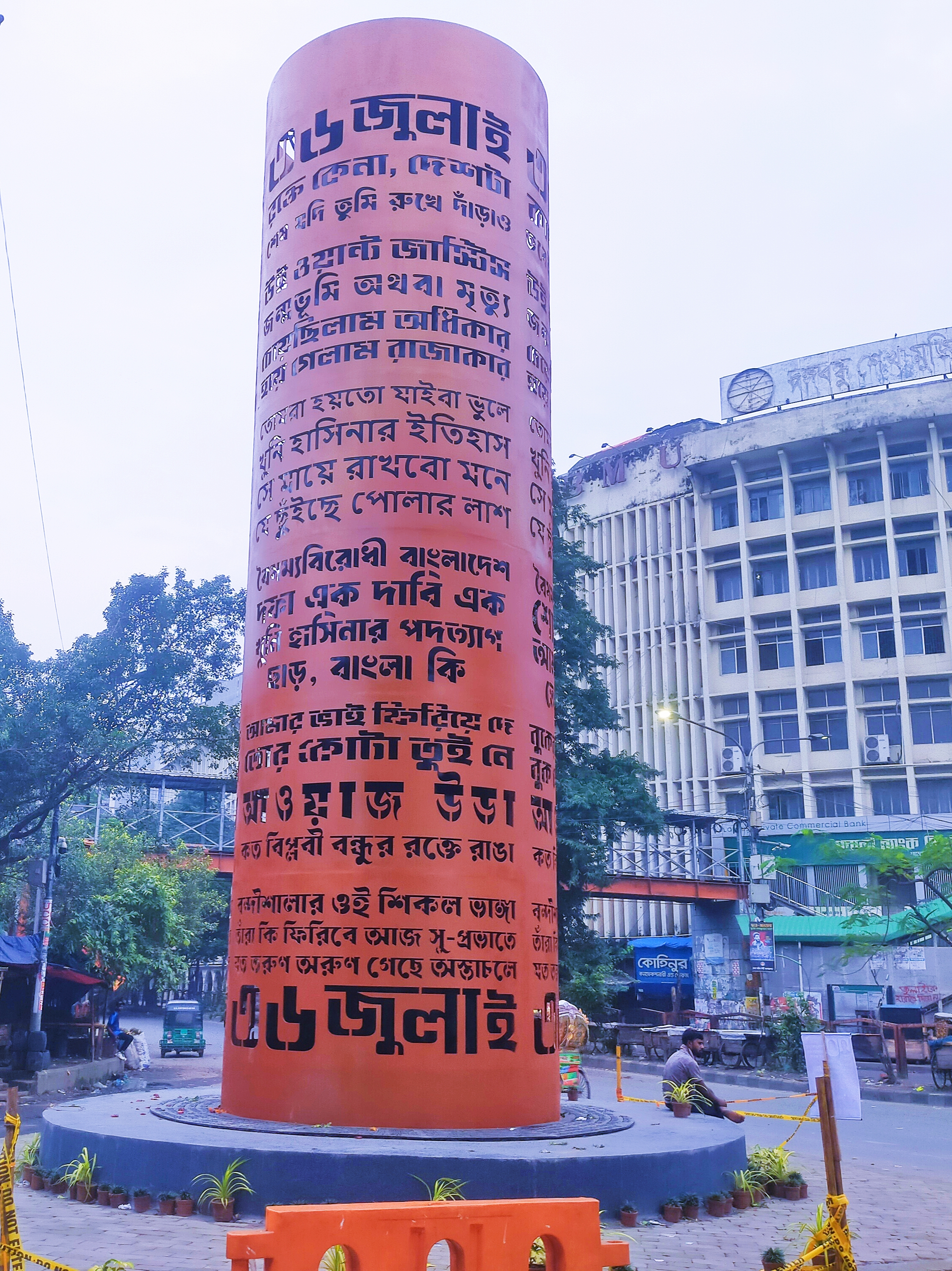
A July Martyr's Monument in Dhaka Which has "আউয়াজ উডা" (Awaaz Utha) engraved in Bengali language on it (6th line from the bottom).

== See also ==
- July 36
- "Deshta Tomar Baper Naki", also became popular during the July Revolution
- "Dhana Dhanya Pushpa Bhara", also became popular during the July Revolution
