= July Martyrs' Day =

Commemorative day in Bangladesh

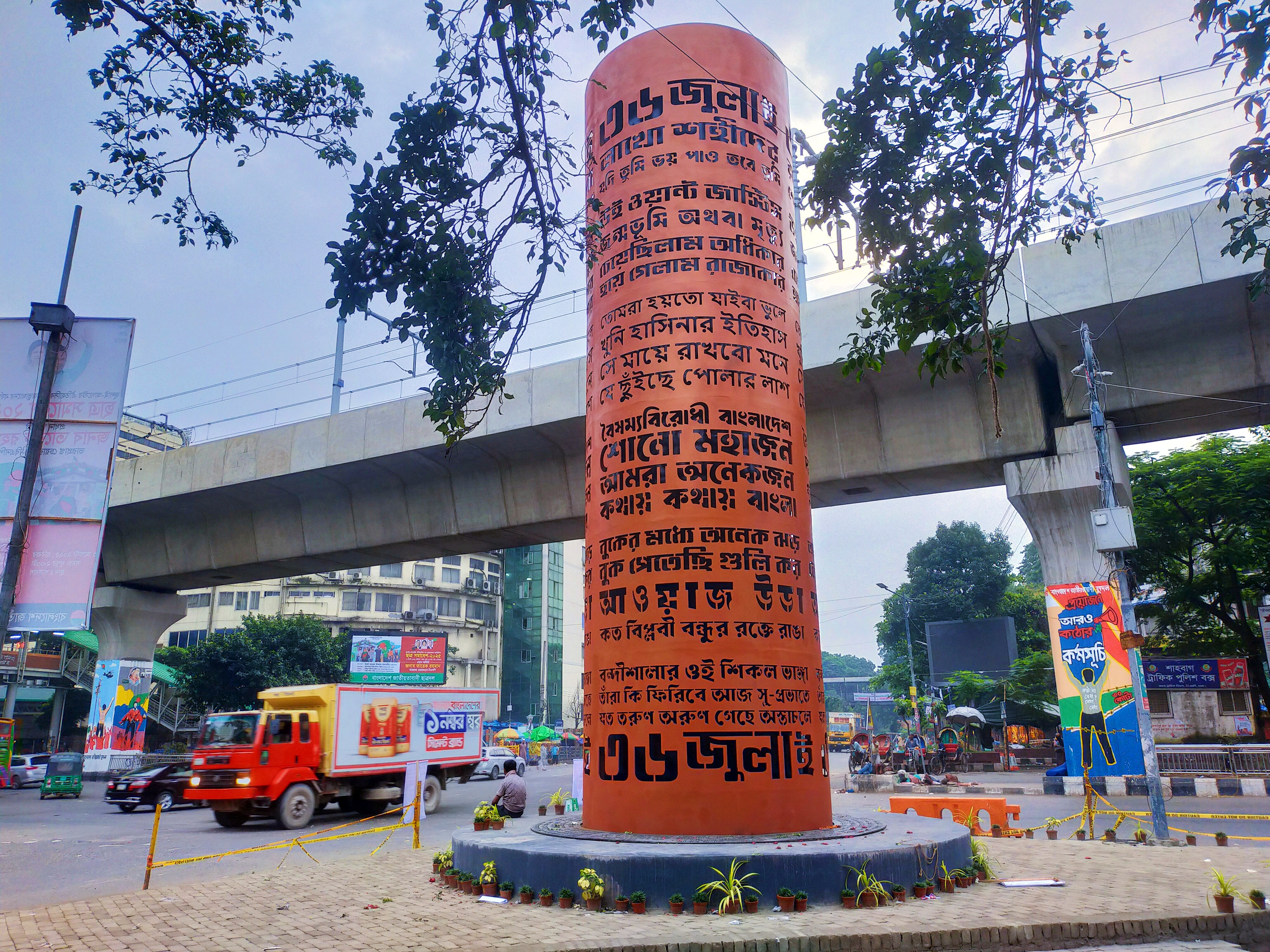
- A July Martyrs' Monument in Dhaka, built in memory of the martyrs of the July massacre. Shahbag, Dhaka.
- Also called: July Shaheed Day; Abu Sayed Day
- Observed by: Bangladesh
- Type: National
- Significance: Observed in memory of Abu Sayed, among the first to die in the July Uprising, and all others.
- Date: 16 July
- Frequency: Annual
- First time: July 16, 2025; 11 months ago
- Started by: Directorate of July Mass Uprising
- Related to: July Mass Uprising Day

July Martyrs' Day (Bengali: জুলাই শহীদ দিবস, romanized: Julāi Śôhīd Dibôs) is a Bangladesh commemorative day on 2 July 2025 through an official gazette, to be observed annually on 16 July. In the list of national and international observances, the day is categorized as a "Type B day". The day is observed in remembrance of Abu Sayed, the first martyr of the 2024 Bangladesh quota reform movement, along with all the martyrs of July. On 5 August 2025 the martyrs of the July Uprising have been declared as "National Heroes" in the July Declaration.

== Background ==
From 1 July to 5 August 2024, during the July Uprising, the then Prime Minister Resignation of Sheikh Hasina was overthrown. In this movement to topple the government, 16 July was a pivotal day because Abu Sayed was shot dead by police on that date, which intensified the protests.
