= July Uprising Day =

Holiday in Bangladesh

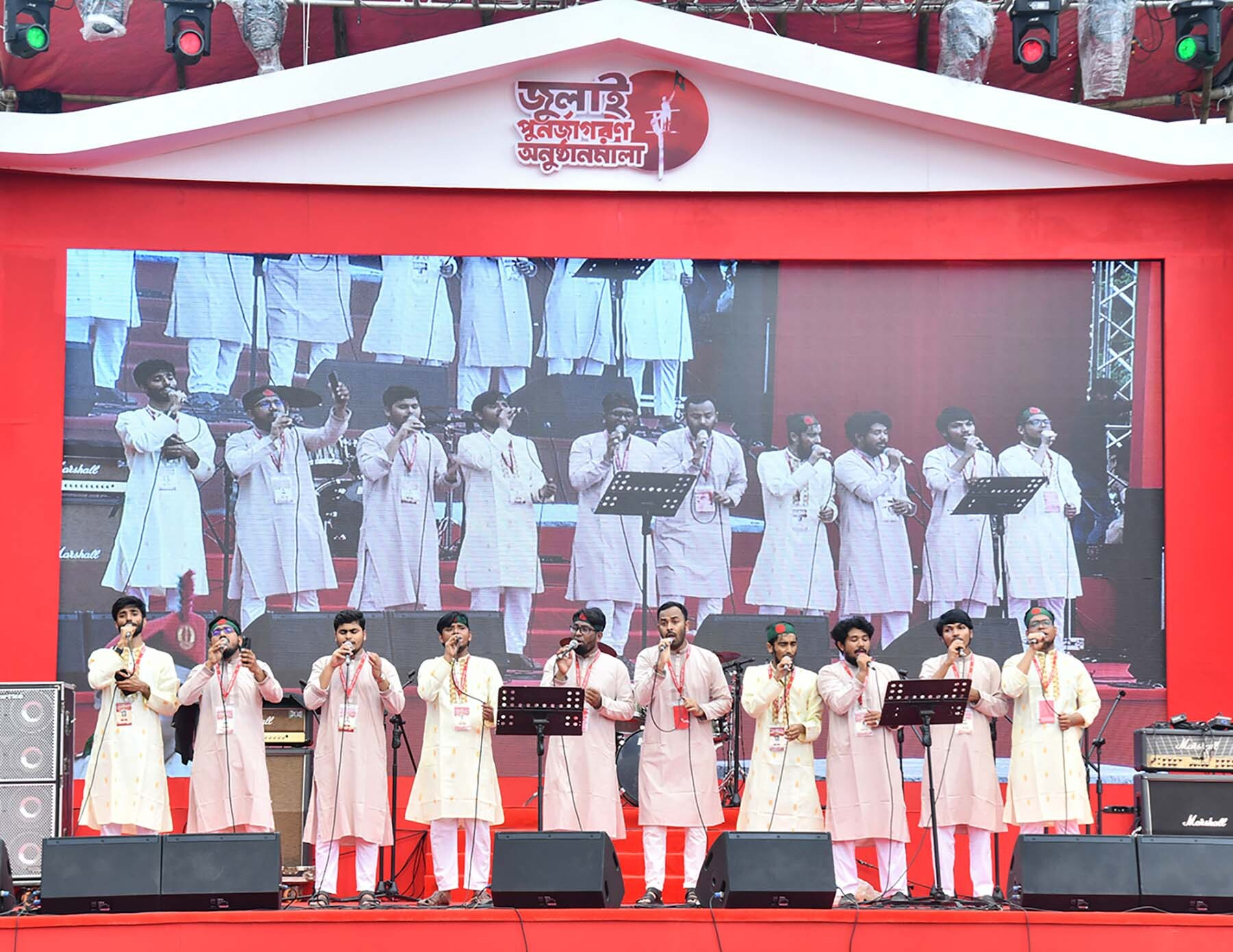
- Singers on July Uprising Day programme
- Official name: July Mass Uprising Day
- Also called: 36 July
- Observed by: Bangladesh
- Type: National
- Significance: Anniversary of the July Uprising
- Celebrations: Floral tributes at memorials, victory rallies, air shows, concerts, documentary screenings, drone shows
- Date: 5 August
- Frequency: Annual
- First time: 5 August 2025; 10 months ago
- Started by: Directorate of July Mass Uprising
- Related to: July Martyrs' Day

July Uprising Day, officially known as July Mass Uprising Day (Bengali: জুলাই গণ-অভ্যুত্থান দিবস, romanized: Julāi Gônô-Ôbhyutthān Dibôs), is a national holiday in Bangladesh that is celebrated on 5 August annually from 2025, commemorating the July Uprising.

On 5 August 2024, as a result of the uprising, prime minister Sheikh Hasina resigned, bringing an end to her 15-year rule, which later became known as 36 July.

== Background ==
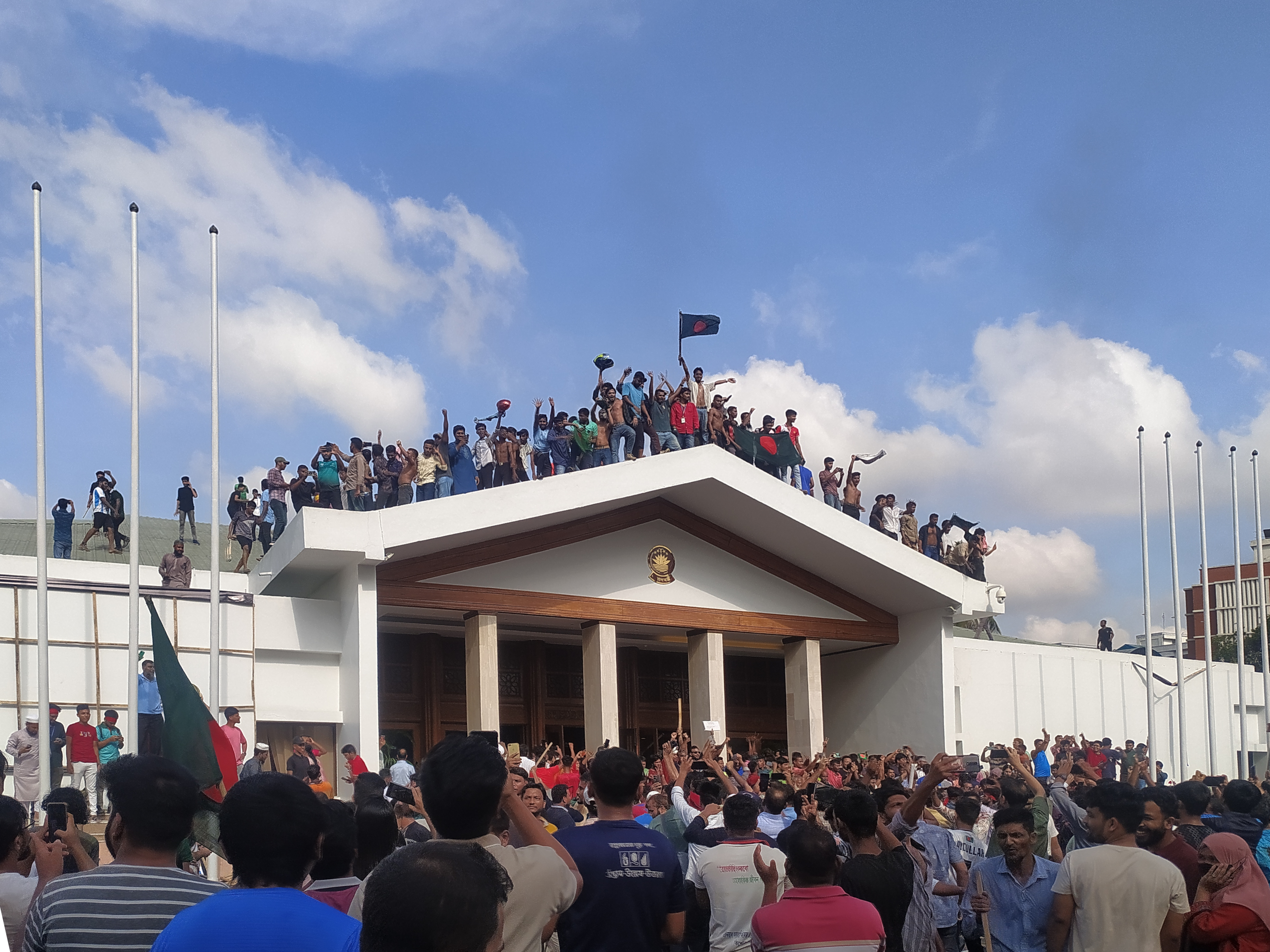
Activists in front of Prime Minister's Office on 5 August 2024, the day of Sheikh Hasina's resignation.

On 1 July 2024, Students Against Discrimination, a non-partisan student platform, initiated the nationwide quota reform movement. During the movement, due to violent attacks on activists, a call for a non-cooperation movement demanding the resignation of prime minister Sheikh Hasina of the then Awami League-led government was made. As part of this, people from various parts of the country began marching towards the capital Dhaka on 5 August 2024. Consequently, Hasina was forced to resign and flee to India with her sister Sheikh Rehana, marking the end of her party's 15-year long rule.

In January 2025, the allocation of business of the Directorate of July Mass Uprising included mention of observing the day, which was subsequently approved. Thereafter, on 25 June 2025, the day was classified as a national day, and on 2 July, it was declared a public holiday.

Considering the ongoing situation, the Ministry of Public Administration declared a public holiday from 5 to 7 August. After the incident, the day began to be referred to by the protesters as 36 July.

On 9 August 2024, Bangladesh Students Union declared 5 August as the "Second Republic Day" during a press conference at their central office. On 20 August, Tarique Rahman, chairman of the Bangladesh Nationalist Party, called for the day to be acknowledged as a national day.

On 16 October 2024, Nahid Islam, former advisor to the Ministry of Posts, Telecommunications and Information Technology and Information and Broadcasting, stated that a date related to the July Uprising would be recognized as national holiday, and discussions were ongoing in the government for that.

That same day, online activist Pinaki Bhattacharya proposed declaring the day as a public holiday named "Anti-Fascism Day" or "Great Escape Day". The following day, a source from the Cabinet Division reported that the day might be officially declared a public holiday, and its name would be finalized in a cabinet meeting. The allocation of business proposal for forming the Directorate of July Mass Uprising under the Ministry of Liberation War Affairs included provisions for commemorating the day, and the proposal was approved in a meeting of the Secretary Committee on Administrative Development on 6 January 2025.

On 29 April 2025, during an inter-ministerial meeting chaired by Faruk-e-Azam, former advisor to the Ministry of Liberation War Affairs, it was decided to recommend the day as a 'Category A' holiday and to send the proposal to the Cabinet Division. On 16 June 2025, Inqilab Moncho compared the day to the country's Independence and Victory Day, demanding it be declared "National Liberation Day".

On 19 June 2025, Mostofa Sarwar Farooki, former advisor to the Ministry of Cultural Affairs, confirmed the decision to observe the day as an annual public holiday from that year. On the same day, the Bangladesh Nationalist Party formed a committee to observe the day as the political party.

On 24 June 2025, the government announced a 26-day "July Memorial Celebration Program" from 1 July to 5 August in observance of the one-year anniversary of the uprising, which included 36 July as a key date. On the next day, the proposed holiday was declared as "July Mass Uprising Day" by the government officially and categorized as Category A holiday.

On 28 June 2025, for the holiday, Bangladesh Jamaat-e-Islami announced plans to hold a mass procession in the capital and rallies and gatherings across the country.

On 2 July 2025, the government declared it a public holiday through an official gazette notification. On the same day, Bangladesh Khelafat Majlis decided to lead a victory procession in 5 August. The following day, the Directorate of Secondary and Higher Education (DSHE) issued a letter instructing all DSHE-affiliated educational institutions in Bangladesh, to observe the holiday. In addition, the Ministry of Information and Broadcasting decided on special programs to mark the day, which include parent assemblies and two film screenings at the offices of deputy commissioners in all 64 districts; multiple film screenings at Bangladesh embassies, various locations, Jatrabari intersection, and all schools, colleges, and universities; Sufi music performances and prayer gatherings at Islamic shrines; publication of books on the July Revolution; honoring the families of six journalists who died in the July massacre; organizing events at the drama stage of the Bangladesh Shilpakala Academy; and publishing special supplements in newspapers. On 17 July 2025, Bangladesh Bank declared it a bank holiday.
