= Shamsul Alam (civil servant) =

M. Shamsul Alam

Personal Secretary to the Prime Minister of Bangladesh
- In office 2001–2006
- Prime Minister: Khaleda Zia

Personal details
- Occupation: Government officer
- Known for: Serving as APS to Prime Minister Khaleda Zia; involvement in Secretariat incident (2006); allegations over property purchase in Gulshan

Md Shamsul Alam is a former personal secretary to Prime Minister Khaleda Zia. Alam is credited with coining the term July 36 the day Prime Minister Sheikh Hasina led Awami League government collapsed.

== Early life ==
Alam was born to Yusuf Ali and Azufa Khatun in Gosairhat, Shariatpur District.

== Career ==
In August 2006, Alauddin Ahmed Chowdhury, then recently serving as assistant personal secretary to the Leader of the Opposition Sheikh Hasina, was involved in a confrontation at the Bangladesh Secretariat. Chowdhury and other officers who had been made officers on special duty during the Bangladesh Nationalist Party government alleged that they were subjected to misbehaviour by fourth-class employees. The incident reportedly occurred when a separate group of officials, identified as having benefited during the Bangladesh Nationalist Party administration and led by Shamsul Alam, visited the Ministry of Establishment. Chowdhury and his colleagues subsequently met with the establishment secretary to complain and stated their intention to appeal to the caretaker government for promotions and postings. Police presence at the Secretariat was increased following the incident, which temporarily disrupted regular work.

According to Prime Minister Khaleda Zia’s ex-private secretary AHM Nurul Islam, Alam, as assistant personal secretary to the prime minister, played a role in the politicisation of Bangladesh’s civil administration during the Bangladesh Nationalist Party-led government from 2001 to 2006. Islam alleged that Alam, along with a group of senior and mid-level officials, helped create lists categorizing civil servants by perceived political affiliation. The list was then used to influence promotions, postings, and transfers. Officials identified as sympathetic to the opposition Awami League were often denied promotions, transferred to undesirable posts, or made officers on special duty. At the same time, those with ties to figures such as Haris Chowdhury or Alam were favoured for desirable positions. In 2005, The Daily Star reported that Alam was asked by the Prime Minister’s Principal Secretary Kamal Siddiqui to explain how he bought land and a house in Gulshan worth several million Bangladeshi Taka. The report said no action was taken on this request, and that Alam ignored it with the Prime Minister Khaleda Zia’s knowledge. These claims were part of wider criticism about corruption in the Prime Minister’s Office during the Bangladesh Nationalist Party’s second term in power.

The Anti-Corruption Commission asked Alam and 10 others associated with former Prime Minister Khaleda Zia to submit their wealth statements. In February 2008, Alam On 10 November 2008, Alam was sentenced to 13 years imprisonment in a corruption case. According to the case he had 17.9 million BDT in illicit wealth. His wife, Khadiza Anam, was sentenced to three years' imprisonment in the same case. The court also ordered his assets to be confiscated.

In September 2021, a member of the Awami League information and research subcommittee, Shawkat Ali Patwari Tuhin, served a legal notice against Alam over comments against Prime Minister Sheikh Hasina. At that time Alam was living in the United States. Alam had posted on Facebook money was smuggled outside the country using diplomatic pouches during Sheikh Hasina's official trip to Europe.

During protests in 2024 that toppled Prime Minister Sheikh Hasina and the Awami League government, Alam is credited with coining the term July 36. Alam noted that intelligence agencies and Embassy of the United States, Dhaka sources predicted that Hasina's government would fall by July 2024. When Hasina did not resign by the end of July, protesters extended the symbolic “July” period to “July 36,” meaning July would continue until Hasina stepped down.

== Personal life ==
Alam is married to Khadiza Anam.
