= July 36 =

Non-existent date coined in Bangladesh

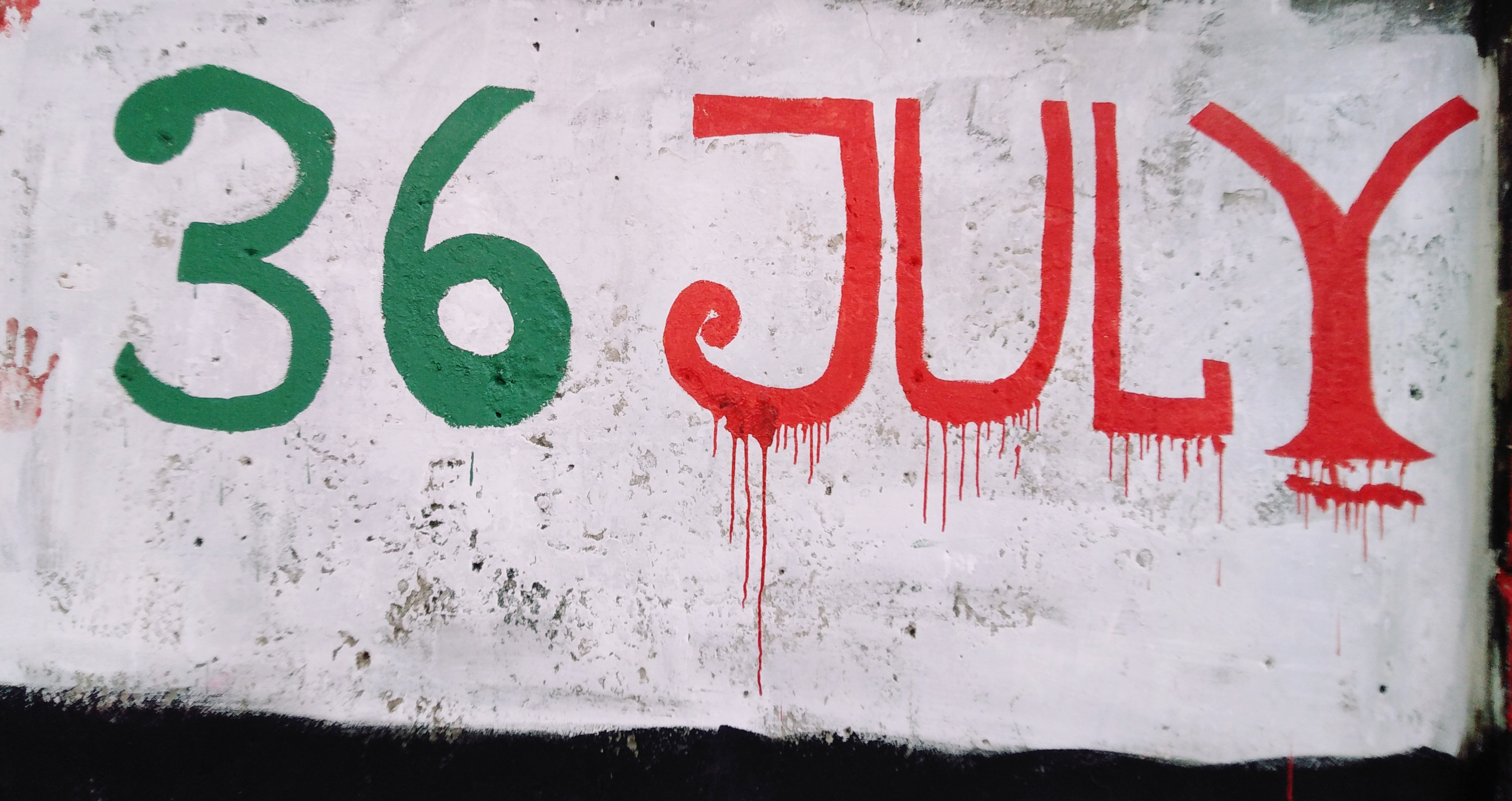
An English graffiti of July 36

In Bangladeshi popular culture, July 36 (or 36 July) (Note: Bangladesh uses DD-MM-YYYY format, hereby 36 July is more widely used.) (Note: Bengali: ৩৬ জুলাই, romanized: 36 Julāi, or ৩৬শে জুলাই, 36śē Julāi, '36th [of] July') is a non-existent date that refers to 5 August 2024, when then Prime Minister Sheikh Hasina resigned and fled the country amidst a mass uprising.

== Background ==
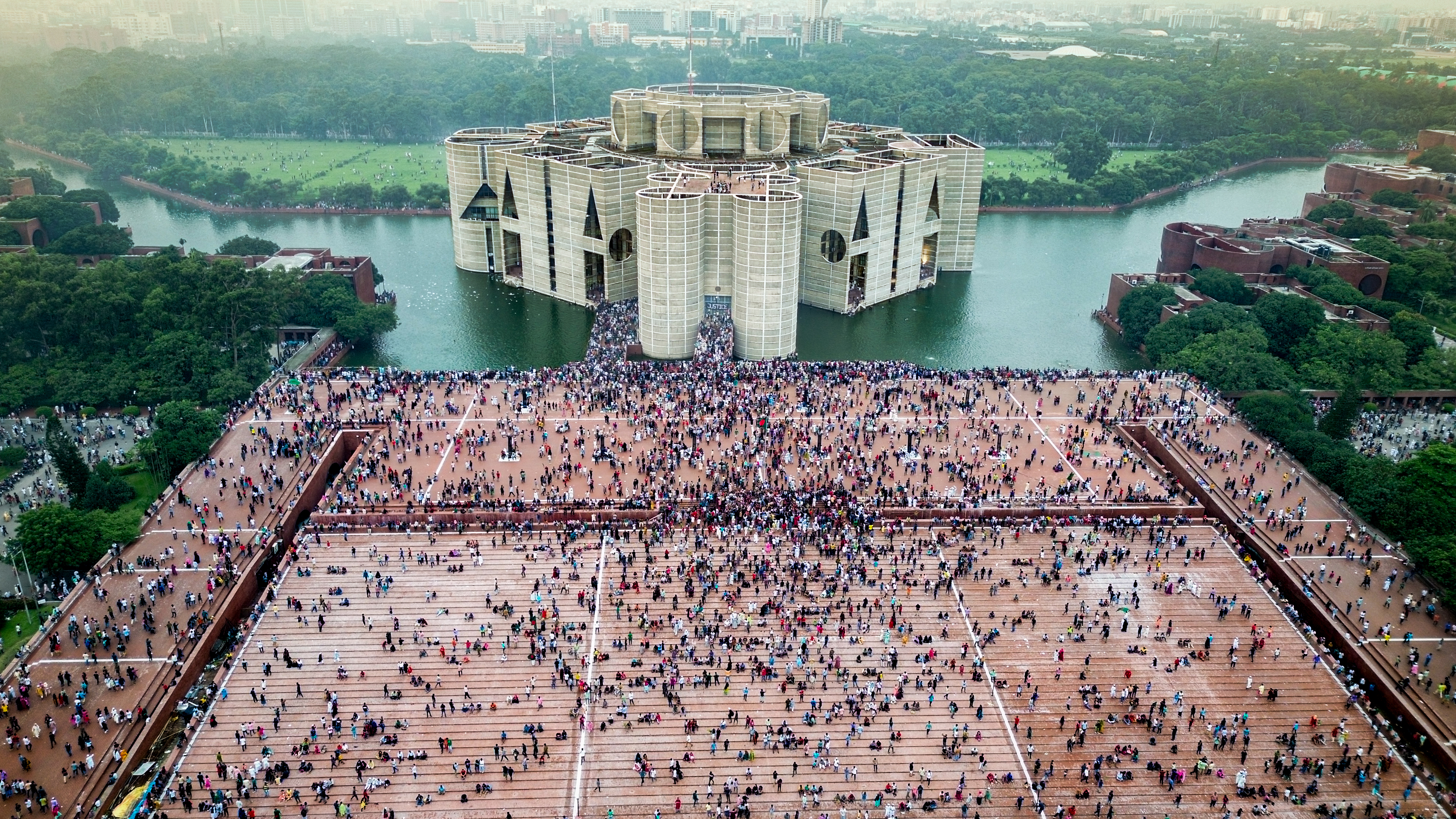
Protesters occupy the Jatiya Sangsad Bhaban following the resignation of Sheikh Hasina

On 5 June 2024, the High Court Division of the Bangladesh Supreme Court reinstated the quota system in government jobs, and the quota reform movement began in Bangladesh. The movement turned deadly on 16 July. On 21 July, the Appellate Division of the Supreme Court overturned the High Court verdict and ruled in favor of quota reform, but the movement continued with nine-point demands calling the mass killing in the movement, what protesters called the July massacre. On 11 July 2024, Bangladeshi Prime Minister Sheikh Hasina, in a press conference called the anti-quota protesters the "grandchildren of Razakars", which angered the students of Dhaka University. This sparked violent protests across the country throughout the month of July, resulting in many lethal casualties and vandalism.

Shamsul Alam, an exiled Bangladeshi senior bureaucrat and online activist residing in the United States, made a Facebook post on 1 August writing about the fictional extension of the month of July until the protests meet success, which translates below:

Avatar of Facebook.com

Facebook.com
(@Shamsul Alam)
tweeted:

Bengali:

জুলাই মাস টেনে দেওয়া হলো বিজয় অবধি - আজ ৩২, কাল ৩৩ তারিখ...এভাবে বিজয়ে গিয়ে শেষ হবে মুক্তির ক্যালেন্ডার!

Translation:

July has been extended until victory - today is the 32nd, tomorrow is the 33rd...in this way, the calendar of liberation will end with victory!

1 August 2024post

Alam's post became viral and protesters also agreed they were "counting down the month of July until the demands are met", thus they counted 1 August as "32 July". The Students Against Discrimination, which led the movement, called for the non-cooperation movement from 4 August (35 July) and announced their "Long March to Dhaka" programme on 5 August (36 July). On that day, millions of people surrounded the Ganabhaban (in Alam's language, the Bastille) and Sheikh Hasina resigned and fled to India. The success of the movement was termed by the agitators as "Second Independence" or "Rebirth Day" and the day as "36 July".

== Recognition ==
On 2 July 2025, the interim government declared 5 August a public holiday named "July Mass Uprising Day". The Directorate of Secondary and Higher Education (DSHE) instructed all DSHE-affiliated educational institutions to observe the day.

A road in Dhaka which was previously named Sheikh Hasina Sarani was renamed to July 36 Expressway in the date’s honour.

== Popular culture ==
Renowned personalities like Mostofa Sarwar Farooki, Akbar Ali and others spoke using the term 36 July. 36 July was depicted in different ways on the countrywide murals and graffiti made by the students, including a calendar of July month comprising 36 days at Jigatola, Dhaka.

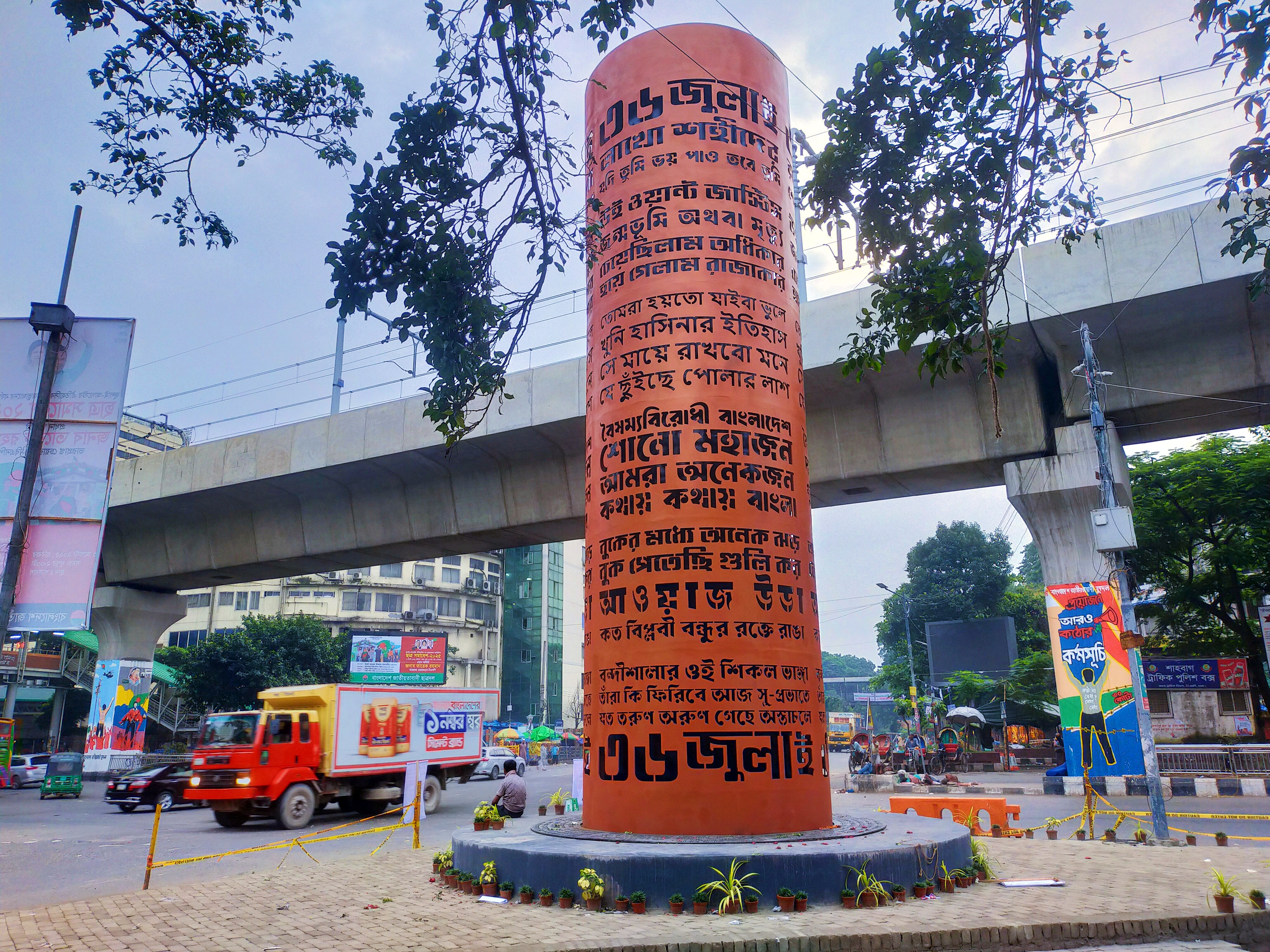
A July Martyr's Monument in Dhaka Which has ৩৬ জুলাই (36 July) engraved in Bengali language on it

== See also ==
- List of non-standard dates
- Awaaz Utha
- Chalaiden
