= O Priya Tumi Kothay (song) =

Song by Asif Akbar

from the album O Priya Tumi Kothay
- Language: Bengali
- Published: 2001
- Length: 5:10
- Songwriter: Ethun Babu

O Priya Tumi Kothay track listing
- 1. O Priya Tumi Kothay; 2. Kokhono Bhalobasoni; 3. Chokeri Jole Lekha

O Priya Tumi Kothay (Bengali: ও প্রিয়া তুমি কোথায়) is a Bengali song by singer Asif Akbar. The album O Priya Tumi Kothay was released on 2001.The meaning of the song name in English is "O Darling where are you?" The song gained popularity in its country and abroad. The song O Priya Tumi Kothay has more than 70 million views on YouTube channel. This song was written and composed by Ethun Babu.
