= July Memorial Monument, Shahbag =

- জুলাই শহীদ স্মৃতিস্তম্ভ
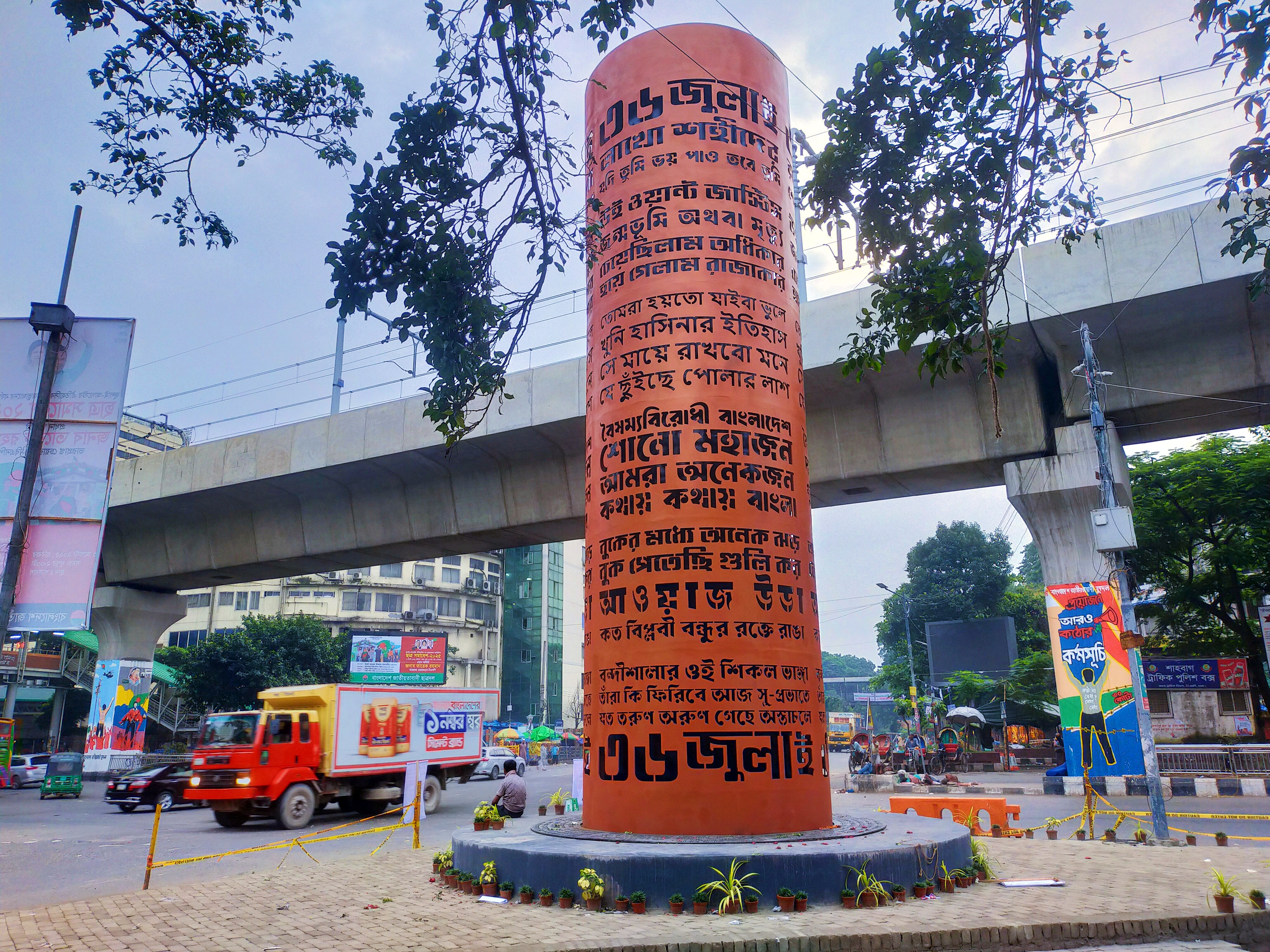
- July Memorial Monument at Shahbag, Dhaka
- Interactive map of July Memorial Monument, Shahbag
- Location: Shahbag, Dhaka, Bangladesh
- Coordinates: 23.7383°N 90.3966°E
- Type: Public monument
- Material: Concrete
- Height: 18 feet (5.5 m)
- Inauguration date: 5 August 2025

The July Memorial Monument is a commemorative structure located in Shahbag, Dhaka, Bangladesh. It honors the martyrs of the July uprising and symbolizes the resilience of the protesters involved in the movement.

== Background ==
The monument was established to honor the martyrs of the July uprising, a pivotal movement in Bangladesh’s recent history. The uprising took place in July 2025, when citizens mobilized across the country to protest against government negligence and demand accountability for social and political injustices. It marked a moment of collective resistance, with widespread demonstrations, rallies, and public expressions of dissent.

The monument was installed as part of a nationwide initiative to establish similar memorials in all 64 districts of Bangladesh. It serves as a reminder of the sacrifices made by those who participated in the July uprising.

== Design and features ==
Standing 18 feet tall with a 6-foot diameter, the monument is constructed from concrete. It features inscriptions of slogans, graffiti, and poems from the July revolution.

== Location ==
The monument is located in the Shahbagh area of Dhaka and central to key administrative and educational institutions.

== See also ==
- July Revolution (Bangladesh)
- Shaheed Minar, Dhaka
- July Martyr's Monuments
