= Deshta Tomar Baper Naki =

2022 Bangladeshi protest song by Moushumi Chowdhury

Song by Moushumi Chowdhury
- Language: Bengali
- Released: 2022
- Recorded: 2022
- Genre: Protest song
- Length: 5:02
- Label: EB Music TV
- Songwriter: Ethun Babu
- Producer: Ethun Babu
External media
Audio
- "Deshta Tomar Baper Naki" on YouTube
Video
- "Deshta Tomar Baper Naki" on YouTube

"Deshta Tomar Baper Naki" (Bengali: দেশটা তোমার বাপের নাকি, lit. 'Does the country belong your father') is a 2022 Bengali language protest song by the Bangladeshi singer Moushumi Chowdhury, and composed by the Bangladeshi composer Ethun Babu. The song gained popularity during the July Revolution of Bangladesh and the RG Kar Hospital rape and murder protests in India.

== Background ==
Moushumi Chowdhury first sung the song in 2022 in the context of the Bangladesh Nationalist Party (BNP)-led anti-government protests against Sheikh Hasina. However, singer Ruksar Rahman claimed that she first performed the song in stage, though the song was recorded in Moushumi's voice. Moushumi faced threats from the Hasina government after the release of the song, and she had leave her home for Dhaka for security purpose.

== Impact and legacy ==
The gained significant popularity during the quota reform movement of Bangladesh's July Revolution.

In the late-August 2024, a singer from Assam, India named Altaf Hussein was detained for an uploading sightly modified version of the melody and lyrics of this song, for which he was alleged for creating tensions along the communal lines.

The song also gained popularity during the protests over RG Kar Hospital rape and murder in India.

== See also ==
- "Awaaz Utha", hip hop protest song by Hannan Hossain Shimul composed during 2024 Bangladesh quota reform movement
- "Dhana Dhanya Pushpa Bhara", patriotic song by D. L. Roy the also became popular in Bangladesh's July Revolution
