= Rob Wyda =

American judge

The Honorable Robert C. Wyda

Allegheny County Magisterial District Judge
- In office 2000–2013

Personal details
- Born: March 26, 1959
- Died: August 5, 2013 (aged 54) Bethel Park, Pennsylvania, U.S.
- Party: Republican and Democratic

Rob Wyda (March 26, 1959 – August 5, 2013) was the District Judge of Bethel Park and Upper St. Clair, one of the largest magisterial districts in Pennsylvania. Beginning in 1999, he was elected three times. He announced his candidacy for a seat on the Pennsylvania Superior Court in March 2013, but withdrew a few weeks later.

He also served as a Commander in the United States Navy Reserve in the Judge Advocate General's Corps. Between 2003 and 2008 he fulfilled assignments in Afghanistan, Iraq, and Guantanamo Bay, Cuba.

== Legal career ==
Judge Wyda held a law degree from Duquesne University. Before taking office in January 2000, he spent seven years as an assistant district attorney, and three years as an assistant court administrator, in Allegheny County's district courts.

As judge, he immediately took the lead in helping the community deal with an epidemic of heroin addiction. He took one day a month to visit public and private schools in his district, and when dealing with juvenile offenders, Judge Wyda would give parents his cellphone number, instructing them to call him if their child was in danger of backsliding. He was known to personally visit the homes of truant kids to discourage such behaviour.

=== Elections ===
He was first elected in 1999, and won a second term in 2005.

Judge Wyda ran in 2011 on both the Republican and Democratic Party primary tickets, defeating William S. Evans in both contexts, on May 17. He won 73.1% and 68.7% of the vote, respectively. He ran unopposed in the November 8th general election. His term would have expired in 2018.

Wyda announced his candidacy on March 1, 2013, for Seat 1 on the Superior Court of Pennsylvania, but despite getting the required 2,000 signatures and qualifying for the Republican primary ballot, he withdrew from the race on March 27, leaving the GOP nomination to Cumberland County attorney Vic Stabile.

== Military service ==
In 2003 Wyda spent time at the Bagram detention facility assisting in the investigations of detainees suspected of international terrorism.

In 2006 Wyda served assisting the prosecution prepare cases against Guantanamo captives who faced charges before the Guantanamo military commissions as part of the United States Department of Defense's Criminal Investigation Task Force.

Wyda was extensively quoted in a 2007 Pittsburgh Tribune-Review article about his time in the service, saying:

- "The detainees are receiving humane treatment -- period,"
- "One of the detainees walked into court and said, 'I'm going to make this easy for all of you. I did what you've accused me of,'

"It was chilling. It gave me goose bumps. It affirmed for me that what I was doing in (Guantanamo) was the right thing to do, to be a part of the mission to bring these evildoers to justice."

- "That's why these people are still detained ... These organizations are underground, so there's going to be a need for security and secrecy in fighting this war."

Judge Wyda would attend Bethel Park High School graduations in his Navy uniform and recognize graduates who signed up for military service.

== Death ==
Wyda died at age 54 on August 5, 2013, of a heart attack in his home in Bethel Park, Pennsylvania. He was survived by his wife, Shannon, son, Jared, daughter, Rachel and mother, Martha.
