= Otto Buchsbaum =

Austrian-born Brazilian activist

Otto Buchsbum
- Born: May 2, 1920; Vienna, Austria
- Died: August 5, 2000 (aged 80)
- Known for: Teatro ao Encontro do Povo movement

Otto Buchsbaum (May 2, 1920 – August 5, 2000) was born in Vienna, Austria. He moved to Brazil in 1939. In 1967, he led, together with his wife, Florence Buchsbaum, the movement "Teatro ao Encontro do Povo" (Theater for the People), whose aim was to offer theater shows to the people, trying to discuss their lives and the world. He founded, in the 1970s, the politico-ecological movement "Resistência Ecológica" (Ecological Resistance) and also ran the newspaper Abertura Cultural (Cultural Opening), which was the mainstay of the movement.
