= Rachel's Challenge =

Anti-violence organization

Rachel's Challenge is an organization in the United States that works to reduce violence. It is a non-religious, non-profit, non-political organization, led by Darrell Scott and his wife Sandy.

Rachel Scott was the first student to be killed in the Columbine High School shooting in 1999. Darrell Scott, Rachel's father, established Rachel's Challenge to perpetuate his daughter's example and the two-page "Code of Ethics" she wrote a month before her death at the hands of the perpetrators of the Columbine High School shooting, Eric Harris and Dylan Klebold. This code of ethics had included the words: "Compassion is the greatest form of love humans have to offer", and Darrell Scott has stated his belief in this message forms the basis for what he both speaks at public appearances, and has written as an author.

The Rachel’s Challenge presentations are given in schools and communities by members of her family and other speakers, using video footage of the Columbine High School massacre and its aftermath, combined with Rachel Scott’s drawings and writings, in a campaign to quell school violence, bullying, and teen suicide. As of 2009, Rachel's Challenge has developed a team of 30 speakers addressing young people in schools and colleges worldwide about Rachel's example. The Rachel's Challenge program includes establishing Friends of Rachel clubs in schools, following the initial presentation, to sustain the campaign's goals on a long-term basis. Schools around the country have incorporated Rachel's challenge into their own clubs bringing the message to their students.

== Darrell Scott ==
Darrell Scott has co-authored three books about his daughter's life and her impact, urging students to practice compassion and kindness. Newsweek reported that he and the organization have "reached out to thousands of schools to deliver a 'chain reaction' of hope through school assemblies, workshops and outreach programs." Scott told Newsweek, "...principals and teachers always need to be on the lookout for that kid who's isolated, or that's quiet, who always stays to himself, because that's typically the type of kid who ends up exploding. They also need to create an atmosphere in the school where students share with someone if they ever hear or see a threat. We know there have been numerous school shootings prevented because a student saw another student writing that he wanted to kill someone or something like that. I think that taking every single threat of any kind seriously is of utmost importance, and again to me it's cultivating an atmosphere, a climate and a culture where everyone's accepted. Because when people feel accepted they're not going to do something like Eric and Dylan [the Columbine perpetrators] did."

== Craig Scott ==
Rachel Scott’s younger brother Craig, a 16-year-old Columbine High School sophomore at the time of the shootings, was physically unharmed but witnessed several classmates being killed in the school library as he huddled under a table with two friends, Isaiah Shoels and Matthew Kechter—both of whom were among the fatalities. The next day, he was interviewed at length by Katie Couric on the Today show. The tearful interview, which NBC did not interrupt with normally scheduled station breaks, was described a year later by USA Today as "one of the most indelible moments of the tragedy". Craig wrote of his sister Rachel, "...her love for people was less conditional than anyone I knew... It didn't matter to her what you looked like or who your friends were. Another thing I liked and respected so much was that she made it clear... what her beliefs were".

Craig continues to make frequent speaking appearances on behalf of Rachel's Challenge, urging teens to strive for a classroom "atmosphere of kindness and compassion" to stem school violence. He is also periodically interviewed on various television programs, such as 20/20, Dateline NBC, and the Today show, to discuss the loss of his sister and his difficult recovery from the traumatic ordeal he experienced as an eyewitness to the murderous rampage.

== Work ==
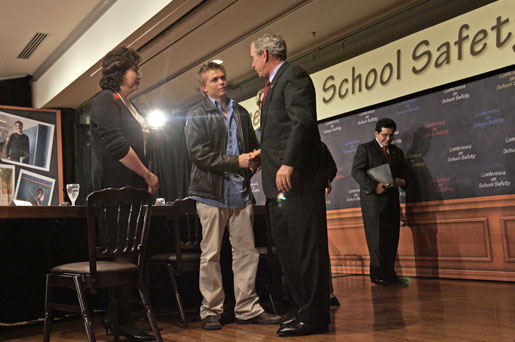
Craig Scott with then-United States President George W. Bush at a White House meeting on October 10, 2006

At the White House Conference on School Safety held in Washington, DC, on October 10, 2006, Craig Scott addressed the President of the United States, the United States Attorney General, and the Secretary of Education, saying, in part, "Kindness and compassion can be the biggest antidotes to anger and hatred, and I believe the biggest antidotes to violence. We've seen bullying stopped, incidents where a student came up with hit lists or plans to shoot up his school, and told either the speaker or told the teacher about their plans, but had a change of heart. How have we done it? We've done it with a simple story of a young girl who believed in compassion, Rachel Joy Scott. But my sister is not the only one who believes in kindness, and she's not been the only one in her brave stance against the injustice willing to stand up for the one who gets put down in school, to sit by the student that sits all alone at lunch, and to talk to or reach out to the one who is consistently ignored or made fun of. She literally has inspired millions of people to continue the chain reaction she started...".

In the aftermath of the Virginia Tech shooting, on April 16, 2007. Darrell and Craig Scott were interviewed on various television programs, such as Showbiz Tonight, The Oprah Winfrey Show, Fox & Friends, and Geraldo at Large, to share their thoughts about school violence and to remember Rachel Scott near the eighth anniversary of the Columbine tragedy. Craig Scott urged viewers on The Oprah Winfrey Show two days later to refrain from too much focus on the shooter, saying "I have found students that actually idolize the two shooters at Columbine... We've focused on my sister, who's so compassionate and kind. And from that, that's the opposite of that anger and hatred."

On April 20, 2009, the tenth anniversary of the Columbine shootings, Darrell Scott told NBC interviewer Natalie Morales on the Today show, "We've seen a lot of lives changed from her story and our program, Rachel's Challenge, has touched literally 13 million lives over the last ten years". He said that from September 2008 to April 2009, his organization received 105 emails from teens dissuaded from suicide because of attending a Rachel's Challenge program. In a separate interview aired the same day, Craig Scott told Morales that, "I meet a lot of hurting students out there and I share with them my hurtful story, but I'm not just carrying a sob story around ... I'm trying to share with them some of the things that I learned to get through it and to be a better person because of it". As of 2008, Craig Scott has spoken to more than one million people in making appearances for Rachel's Challenge, while pursuing a career in filmmaking. He hopes to produce inspirational films and is on the board of directors of the American Screenwriters Association.
