= S D Rubel =

Bangladeshi singer

S D Rubel এস ডি রুবেল
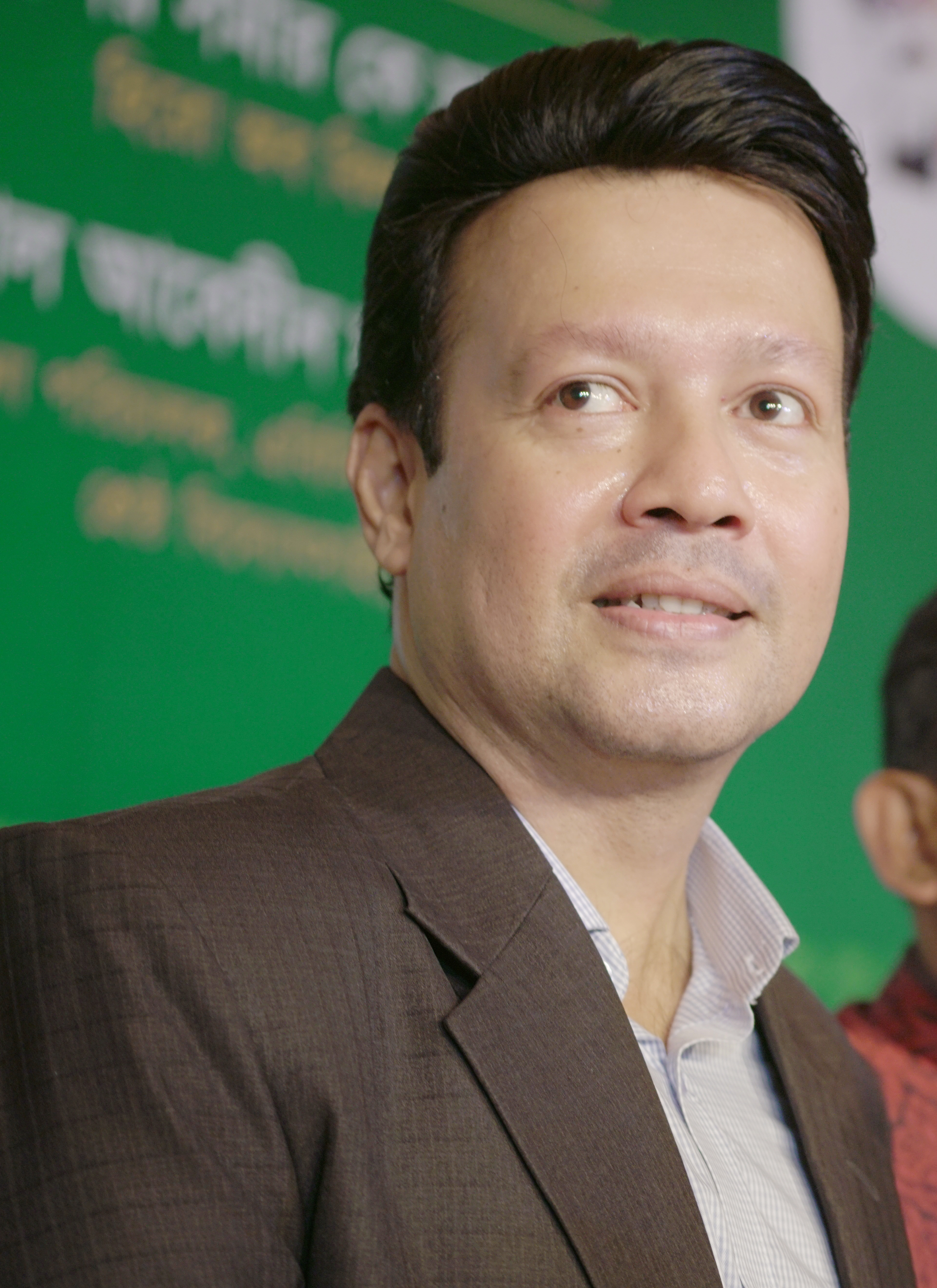
- Rubel in 2020

Background information
- Born: 18 September 1984 (age 42); Chandpur, Bangladesh
- Genre: Pop
- Occupations: Musician; Director; Actor
- Years active: 1995–present

S D Rubel (born 18 September 1984) is a Bangladeshi singer, composer, lyricist, and music director. He is known for his long career in Bengali music and his work as a playback singer in Bangladeshi films. He also works as an actor, film director and producer.

== Early life ==
Rubel was born on 18 September 1984 in Chandpur, Bangladesh. He completed his Secondary School Certificate (SSC) from Chandpur Hasan Ali Government High School and his Higher Secondary Certificate (HSC) from Chandpur Government College. He later studied chemistry at Dhaka College, where he earned both a Bachelor of Science (Honours) and a Master of Science degree in chemistry. He became involved with music at an early age and later entered the music industry as a professional singer.

== Career ==
He began his music career with the album Jiboner Shoikote, which brought him wide attention. He became well known in Bangladesh for his hit song Lal Benaroshi. Rubel released 37 solo albums and he has sung more than 1,400 Bengali songs, including many film tracks, and is recognized for his work in both solo and mixed music albums. He has also worked as a playback singer for Bangladeshi movies. In 2019, he returned to playback singing with the song "Radha Krisna" for a film directed by Palash Khan.

In addition to singing, he has composed and written music for other artists and produced TV dramas, telefilms, documentaries and music videos.

=== Film and Directing ===
Rubel made his acting debut in the film Evabei Bhalobasha Hoy in 2011. He later directed his first movie titled Briddhashram, which was completed before the COVID-19 pandemic and is awaiting cinema release.

=== Other Activities ===
He founded a music school called the School of Fine and Performing Arts to train new musicians. He has also served as a cultural organizer and has been involved in different cultural productions in Bangladesh.

== Albums ==
- Ashru
- Porichoy

== Songs ==
- Lal Benaroshi
- Onek Bedona Vhora Amar Ei Jibon
- Tomar Nil Nil Nil Chokhe
- Elo Boishakh
- Ei Sohore Ami Eka
