= O Priya Tumi Kothay (album) =

Studio album by Asif Akbar
- Released: January 30, 2001
- Recorded: 2000
- Genres: Pop, Modern
- Length: 57:17
- Label: Soundtek
- Producer: Soundtek

Asif Akbar chronology
O Priya Tumi Kothay (2001)	O Priya Tumi Kothay (2001)	Sukhe Theko Tumi Bandhobi (2003)

Singles from O Priya Tumi Kothay
- 1. "O Priya Tumi Kothay" Released: January 30, 2001

O Priya Tumi Kothay (Bengali: ও প্রিয়া তুমি কোথায়) is a Bangladeshi music album by Asif Akbar. It was released on 30 January 2001 by the banner of Soundtek. Asif made his music debut with blockbuster hit album. The album sold about 60 lac copy and became the highest grossing audio album in Bangladesh history of all time.

== Track listing ==
S.N	Song title	Lyrics and tunes	Length	YouTube link
01	O Priya Tumi Kothay	Ethun Babu	5:16	* YouTube
02	Kokhono Bhalobashoni	Ethun Babu	5:10	* YouTube
03	Chokheri Jole Lekha	Ethun Babu	5:10	* YouTube
04	Ekhono Majhe Majhe	Ethun Babu	4:52	* YouTube
05	Eto Koso Mene Neya	Ethun Babu	4:34	* YouTube
06	Pathore Lekha Naam	Ethun Babu	4:50	* YouTube
07	Nisthur Tumi	Ethun Babu	4:15	* YouTube
08	Khoma Kore Dio	Ethun Babu	4:46	* YouTube
09	Jala Jala	Ethun Babu	3:53	* YouTube
10	Jare Bhalobashi	Ethun Babu	4:48	* YouTube
11	Jiboner Boro Porajoy	Ethun Babu	4:50	* YouTube
12	Bhalobashi Ami	Ethun Babu	4:42	* YouTube

== Film soundtrack ==
"O Priya Tumi Kothay"

Song by Asif Akbar

from the album O Priya Tumi Kothay
- Language: Bengali
- Published: 2001
- Length: 5:10
- Songwriter: Ethun Babu

O Priya Tumi Kothay track listing
- 01. O Priya Tumi Kothay; 02. Kokhono Bhalobasoni; 03. Chokeri Jole Lekha

O Priya Tumi Kothay (Bengali: ও প্রিয়া তুমি কোথায়) is a Bengali popular song by singer Asif Akbar. The album O Priya Tumi Kothay was released on 2001.The meaning of the song name in English is O Darling where are you? The song gained most popularity with home and also abroad. The song O Priya Tumi Kothay has been listening more than 70 million times on YouTube channel.
