= July Martyr's Monuments =

Memorials in Bangladesh

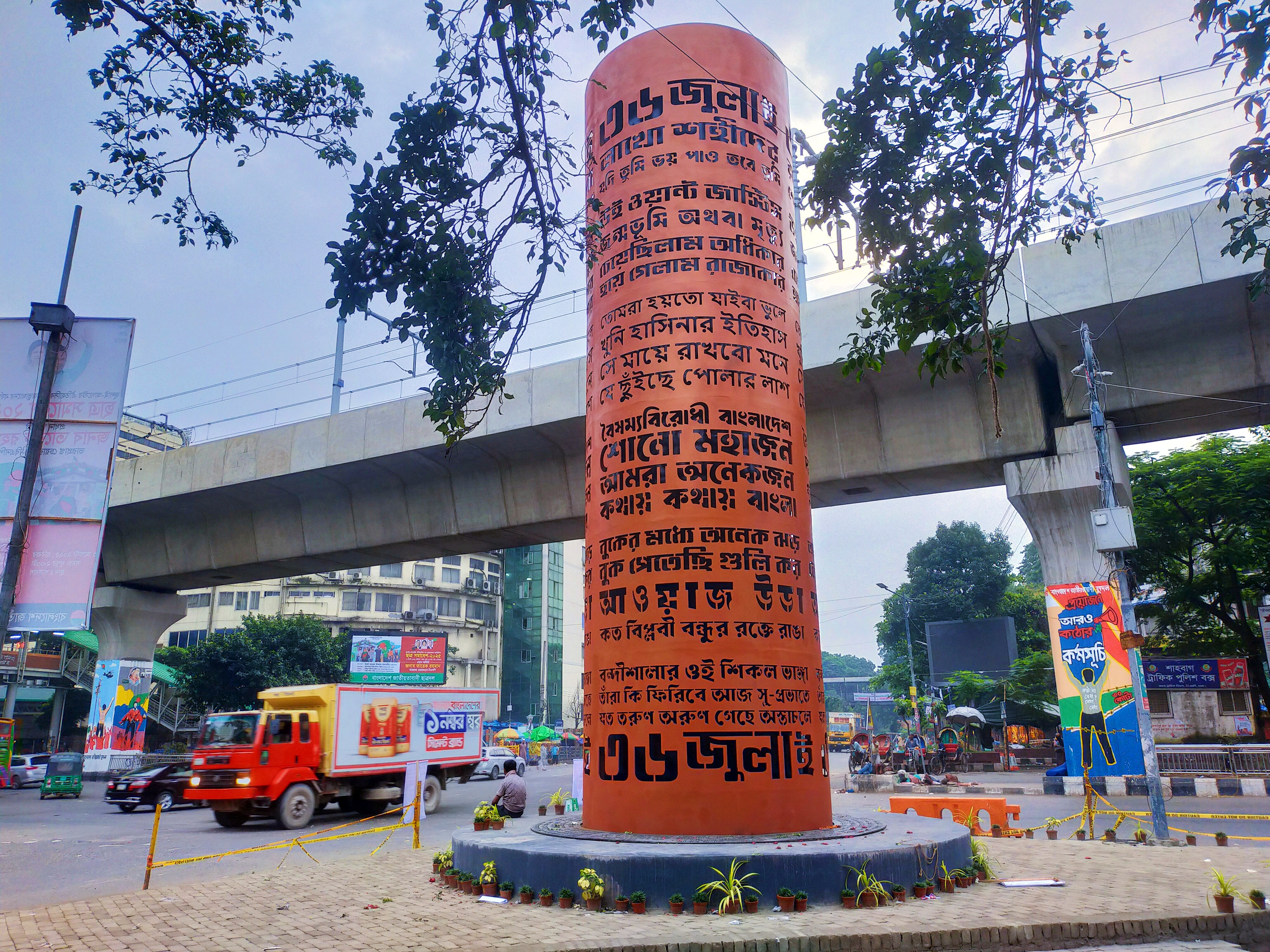
A July Martyr's Monument in Dhaka.

The July Martyr's Monuments (Bengali: জুলাই শহীদ স্মৃতিস্তম্ভ) are memorial monuments under construction across all 64 districts of Bangladesh with a uniform design, commemorating the July massacre. The Government of Bangladesh decided to construct these monuments to mark the anniversary of the July Uprising.

== Background ==
On 24 June 2025, the government announced a month-long program to celebrate the anniversary of the July Uprising. The program included a project to build July Martyrs Memorial Monuments in every district of Bangladesh. On 26 June 2025, a 37-member national committee was formed via gazette notification. This committee planned to construct one monument in each district dedicated to the uprising. The government approved the proposed monument design by artist Abdul Halim Chanchal, endorsed by the Liberation War Affairs Adviser Faruque-e-Azam on 9 July 2025. Following approval, the project formally commenced, and the Cabinet Division directed Deputy Commissioners to identify construction sites. Earlier, on 7 July 2025, the Kurigram District administration decided to build the monument beside the Victory Memorial at College Moor. On 8 July 2025, authorities finalized that the monument in Bandarban would be built beside the Shaheed Minar. The same day, the Mirza Azam Square at Shekhervita in Jamalpur District was demolished for the monument. Additionally, the Chittagong District administration selected the United Nations Park at Panchlaish in the city as the monument site. The Natore District administration set 14 July 2025 as the construction deadline. On 9 July 2025, a meeting of the Kushtia District administration decided to build the monument beside Abrar Fahad Stadium in the city. On 11 July 2025, government adviser Asif Mahmud announced that the monument would be built beside the national highway near Comilla University.

== Construction ==
Approximately ৳1400000 (US$11,000) was allocated for each of the 64 monuments. Construction began across the country on 9 July 2025. This included inauguration at Muktir Sopan Chattar in Sirajganj. The same day, work commenced at the Victory Memorial Chattar in Pouro Park, Gaibandha. In Faridpur, the Awami League office building constructed on government land towards Hasibul Hasan Lablu Road was demolished to begin monument construction. On 10 July 2025, work started beside the Central Shaheed Minar at Muktir Moor in Naogaon. On 11 July 2025, the Deputy Commissioner of Narayanganj District inaugurated construction at the Victory Memorial Chattar in Hajiganj. Construction in Narayanganj was completed before 14 July. On 13 July 2025, the day before its construction was set to begin, the remnants of the Sheikh Mujibur Rahman mural at Bakultala in Jashore were bulldozed. On 14 July 2025, the foundation stone for the monument in Jashore was laid. The same day, construction began at Government College Moor in Meherpur, within Government College premises in Khagrachhari, in front of the old Dak Bungalow at Katiya in Satkhira, near Moktarpara Bridge in Netrokona, near Dhaka Road Bridge in Magura, at Panchlaish in Chittagong and on Alekhar Char Bishwa Road in Comilla. The completed monument in Narayanganj District was inaugurated the same day, bearing the names of 21 people killed in the July Massacre. National Committee Chairman Mostofa Sarwar Farooki assured that construction of all 64 monuments would be completed by 5 August 2025.

== Architectural style ==
According to the design, the steel memorial monument placed on a concrete platform is 18 feet (5.5 m) tall and 6 feet (1.8 m) in diameter. The pillar has internal lighting to illuminate the engraved inscriptions. It includes a 1.5-foot (0.46 m) wide pedestal.

== List ==
Sl.	District	Location	Inauguration Date
1	Narayanganj	23.6349674°N 90.5117454°E	14 July 2025
2	Dhaka	23.7383°N 90.3966°E	5 August 2025
