= Directorate of July Mass Uprising =

Bangladeshi government agency

- Formation: April 30, 2025; 11 months ago
- Headquarters: Dhaka, Bangladesh
- Region served: Bangladesh
- Official language: Bengali
- Website: djmu.portal.gov.bd

The Directorate of July Mass Uprising (Bengali: জুলাই গণ-অভ্যুত্থান অধিদপ্তর) is a directorate of the Ministry of Liberation War Affairs of Bangladesh. It was formally established on April 30, 2025, with the gazette publication of the "July Uprising Martyr Families and July Fighters Welfare and Rehabilitation Ordinance 2025" published by the Ministry of Law, Justice and Parliamentary Affairs.

It was earlier formed as the July Mass Uprising Cell. It maintains the list and information of martyrs in the July Uprising, provide government-determined one-time and monthly financial assistance to the martyr families and injured fighters, and arrange for the rehabilitation of martyr family members and injured fighters. It will work towards the welfare of the martyrs and injured persons and their rehabilitation.

== Department ==
- July Uprising Martyrs List and Information Preservation Department.
- Financial Assistance Department.
- Rehabilitation Department.
