= Asif Akbar =

Bangladeshi singer

Asif Akbar আসিফ আকবর
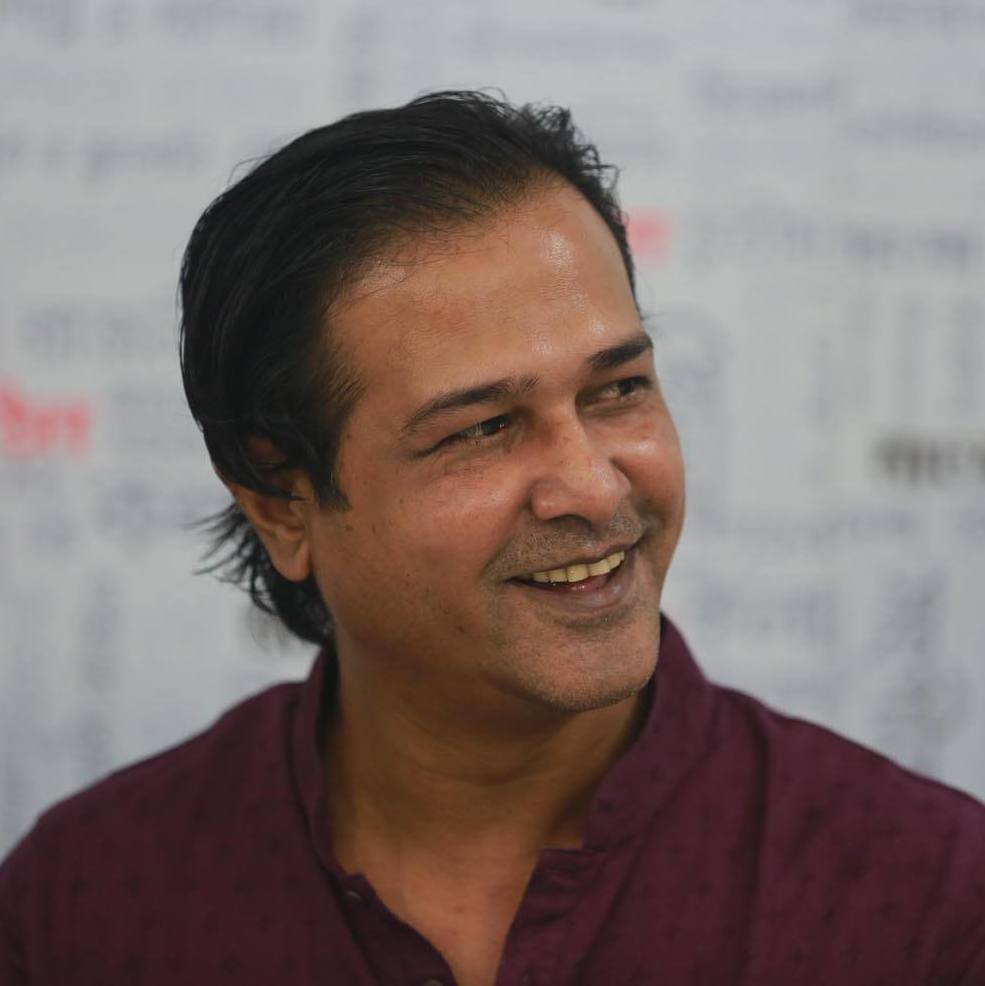
- Asif in 2017

Background information
- Born: 25 March 1972 (age 54); Cumilla, Bangladesh
- Genre: Pop
- Occupations: Musician; producer; actor
- Years active: 1998-present
- Labels: G-Series; Soundtek; ARB
- Spouse: Begum Salma Asif Mitu (m. 1992)
- Website: https://asifakbar.com

Asif Akbar (born 25 March 1972), commonly known as ASIF, is a Bangladeshi singer and cricket personality. He releases solo, duet, and mixed albums and also songs for Bangladeshi cinema. He received six Meril-Prothom Alo Award and a Bangladesh National Film Award. Asif Akbar is one of the directors of the Bangladesh Cricket Board and serves as the chairman of the Age-Group Tournament Committee.

== Background ==
Akbar was born to Ali Akbar and Rokeya Akbar in Comilla. He did his SSC from Comilla Zilla School in 1989 and HSC from Comilla Victoria Government College in 1991.

== Career ==
Music director Shawkat Ali Emon gave Akbar the first break, and he started performing as a playback singer for films since 1998. Akbar made his break with the track "O Priya Tumi Kothay". His debut album was released on 30 January 2001. He consistently releases solo albums and also duets with singers such as Kavita Krishnamurthy, Kumar Sanu, Bappa Mazumder, Doly Shaontoni, Suzana Ansar, Sonia, Kaniz Suborna, Dinat Jahan Munni, Monir Khan, and many others. He temporarily retired from commercial singing on 17 March 2010 to concentrate on his political career but returned to the Bangladeshi music scene with his solo album titled X Prem released in August 2013.

Akbar received the Meril Prothom Alo Award for Best Singer (Male) for five consecutive years from 2001 through 2005, the Bangladesh National Film Award for Best Male Playback Singer for 2006, and for 2013, a record sixth Meril Prothom Alo Award for the performance of his song "X Prem".

== Personal life ==
Akbar is married to Salma Asif Mitu. Politically, he is a supporter of the Bangladesh Nationalist Party (BNP). He was a member of BNP's central executive committee until resigning in 2011.

== Controversy ==
In June 2018, singer Shafiq Tuhin accused Akbar of selling out digital copies of several songs without permission and filed a case against him with Tejgaon Police Station. Akbar was arrested on 6 June from his studio in the FDC area in Dhaka. Later, a Dhaka court rejected both the remand and bail prayers and ordered to send him to jail. After spending 5 days in jail, Dhaka Additional Chief Metropolitan Magistrate granted him bail.

== Discography ==
=== Solo albums ===
Years	Album No	Album name	Genre
2001	001	O Priya Tumi Kothay	Pop
2002	002	Tumi Shukhi Hou	Pop
2002	003	Tumi Kotha Rakhoni	Pop
2002	004	Tumio Kadbe Ekdin	Pop
2003	005	Shukhe Theko Tumi Bandhobi	Pop
2003	006	Pashani Tumi Pashani	Pop
2003	007	Tumi Mone Rakhoni	Pop
2004	008	Akbar Bolo Tumi	Pop
2004	009	Keno Tumi Shukhe Thakbe	Pop
2004	010	Tumi Valobashoni	Pop
2004	011	Tobuo Valobasi	Pop
2005	012	Batashe Prem Uriye Dio	Pop
2005	013	Bachbona	Pop
2005	014	Jobab Daw	Pop
2006	015	Ovinoy	Pop
2006	016	Shongshar	Pop
2006	017	Hridoye Roktokkhoron	Pop
2007	018	Bondi	Pop
2007	019	Shorto	Pop
2007	020	Boikaler Chad	Pop
2008	021	Kichu Bhool Kichu Smriti	Pop
2008	022	Akhono Joshna Dekhi	Pop
2008	023	Ek Fota Asru	Pop
2009	024	Bondhu Tor Khobor Kire	Pop
2009	025	Pani Nai Chokhe	Pop
2009	026	Sei Din Guli Koi	Pop
2009	027	Dorodiyare	Folk
2009	028	Shongkolito Desher Gaan	Pop
2013	029	X-Prem	Pop
2014	030	Jaan Re	Pop

=== Duet and mixed albums ===
No.	Album	Year	Collaborator(s)	Notes
1	Aar Koto Kadabe			
2	Ebong Ami			
3	Ojosrobar Khoma Cheyechi			
4	Ektai Proshno Amar			
5	Aamar Priyo Bandhoby			
6	Ami Tumi Shey			
7	Amii Vul Korechi			
8	Amra Dujone			
9	Anmona			
10	Ononto Opekkha			
11	Onuvobe			
12	Oporadhi			
13	Asman Sakkhi			
14	Ay Fire Ay			
15	Eito Jibon			
16	Bertho Premer Golpo			
17	Bayna			
18	Bedonar Oshru			
19	Vulte Parina Shathi			
20	Birohi Hridoy			
21	Bishonno Sondha			
22	Badhon			
23	Bondhu Maya Nai			
24	Bondhure			
25	Bujhini Kadabe			
26	Chader Desher Konna			
27	Chele Manushi			
28	Cholo Jai Ojanay			
29	Keno Dekhlam Tare			
30	Dukhini Rat			
31	Dukkho Koshto Jontrona			
32	Ei Meye			
33	Eka Tumi Janlena			
34	Firbona Aj Bari			
35	Fis Fas Fis			
36	Har Menechi			
37	Hira Chuni Panna			
38	Jay Din Jay			
39	Jete Chai Prem Nogor			
40	Kemon Acho Notun Thikanay			
41	Kemon Acho Tumi			
42	Kade Mon			
43	Khoma Koro Upoma			
44	Kotha Mone Rakhbe			
45	Kotha Roteche			
46	Kotota Raat Eka Eka			
47	Manoshi			
48	Maya			
49	Milon			
50	Mishti Meye			
51	Mon			
52	Mone Mone Mon			
53	Mon Chuye Jao			
54	Mon Jole			
55	Mon Poboner Nao			
56	Na Paoyar Betha			
57	Nei Tumi Kache			
58	Nirobota			
59	Obohela			
60	Oi Duti Chokhe			
61	Opekkhay Theko			
62	Papi			
63	Pinjira			
64	Porajito Valobasa			
65	Premer Agun Buke			
66	Premer Juari			
67	Priya Kache Nei			
68	Priya Nei Prithibite			
69	Proshno Jage Mone			
70	Sat Asman			
71	Shono Anonna			
72	Sopner Duyare			
73	Sopnobihin			
74	Sukher Shohor			
75	Sukhi Hote Paroni			
76	Sopno Dekhi			
77	Sopnorani			
78	Thikana Bihin Pothe			
79	Tomake Dekhina Kotodin			
80	Tumi Amar Sopno Ghuri			
81	Tumi Bina			
82	Tumi Elena			
83	Tumi Sopno Amar			
84	Uru Uru Mon			
85	Valo Achoto			
86	Valobasa Noy Oporadh			
87	Valobasa Tomake Dhonnobad			
88	Jhograr Gan	2013	Nancy	
89	Jabi Koto Dure	2015	Liza	
90	Bhalobashi Tomakei	2021	Atiya Anisha	

== Film songs ==
Year	Film	Song	Composer(s)	Songwriter(s)	Co-artist(s)
1998	Raja No. 1	"Amari Bhagye Tomari Naam"			solo
2001	Hridoyer Bandhon	"Na Na Korbona Prem"	Shawkat Ali Emon	Kabir Bakul	Kanak Chapa
2001	Hridoyer Bandhon	"E Monta Bolechhe" (version 1)	Shawkat Ali Emon	Kabir Bakul	Kanak Chapa
2001	Bipodjonok	"Ei Jogot Songsare	Ahmed Imtiaz Bulbul	Ahmed Imtiaz Bulbul	Baby Naznin
2002	Arman	"N/A"	Alauddin Ali	Kabir Bakul	Baby Naznin
2002	Bipodjonok	"Ki Jadu Korila Amare"	Ali Akram Shuvo	Kabir Bakul	Dolly Sayontoni
2002	Itihas	"Tumi Koi, Tumi Koi"	Ahmed Imtiaz Bulbul	Ahmed Imtiaz Bulbul	Baby Naznin
2002	Itihas	"Prem Korechhe Prithibite"	Ahmed Imtiaz Bulbul	Ahmed Imtiaz Bulbul	Sabina Yasmin
2002	Karishma	"Premer Pathshalate"	Alam Khan		Baby Naznin
2002	Karishma	"Janure Kichhu Chainare"	Alam Khan		Baby Naznin
2002	Probesh Nishedh	"Ami Tomar Premer Dewana"	Shawkat Ali Emon	N/A	Anima D'Costa
2003	Hingsha Protihingsha	"Koshtoi Koshto, Jibone Amar"	N/A	N/A	solo
2003	Hingsha Protihingsha	"Charidik Nirjon, Koro Na Alingon"	N/A	N/A	Anima D'Costa
2003	Khuner Porinaam	"Ajhore Shrabon Dhara"	Shawkat Ali Emon	Kabir Bakul	Simi Sifat
2003	Sotter Bijoy	"Shopno Dekhi Ami"	Emon Saha	Kabir Bakul	Kanak Chapa
2004	Agun Amar Naam	"Deewana Re Deewana, Ami Prem Deewana"	Emon Saha	Kabir Bakul	Kavita Krishnamurthy
2004	Baap Betar Lorai	"Kokhono Ki Cheyechhile"	Shawkat Ali Emon	N/A	Samina Chowdhury
2004	Kothin Purush	"Bhalobashar Majhe Duti Hridoy"	Shawkat Ali Emon	Kabir Bakul	Kanak Chapa
2004	Kothin Purush	"Chai Gorom Gorom Bhalobasha"	Shawkat Ali Emon	Kabir Bakul	Anima D'Costa
2004	Teji Purush	"Monke Boli Tomari Kotha"	Shawkat Ali Emon	Kabir Bakul	Kanak Chapa
2004	Onno Manush	"O Sokhi Tui Chinli Na"			
2005	Badha	"Ei Tumi Sei Tumi"	Ahmed Imtiaz Bulbul		Kanak Chapa
2005	Ekrokha	"Dewana Re Dewana"			Baby Naznin
2005	Somajke Bodle Dao	"Buke Agun Lage"	Ahmed Imtiaz Bulbul	Ahmed Imtiaz Bulbul	Nazu
2006	Banglar Hero	"O Meye Shono"	Emon Saha	Kabir Bakul	Dinat Jahan Munni
2006	Hira Amar Naam	"Tomar Bari Amar Barir Moddhe Ekta Nodi"	Shawkat Ali Emon	Kabir Bakul	Baby Naznin
2006	Rani Kuthir Baki Itihash	"Amar Majhe Nei Ekhon Ami"	S I Tutul	Kabir Bakul	Samina Chowdhury
2006	Rani Kuthir Baki Itihash	"Shopno Tumi, Sotti Tumi"	S I Tutul	Kabir Bakul	Samina Chowdhury
2006	Torture	"Jaanu Jaanu Jaanu, Tumi Amar Jaani"	N/A	N/A	Bipasha
2006	Torture	"Chokchoke Rupe Tomar Achhe Jaadu"	N/A	N/A	Nazu
2007	Ami Bachte Chai	"Jibon Ei Jibon"	Emon Saha		Anima D'Costa
2007	Moner Sathe Juddho	"Asman Dekhbe Dekhuk"	Emon Saha	Ashraf Babu	Anima D'Costa
2007	Tomar Jonyo Morte Pari	"Chupi Chupi Bole Mon"	Ali Akram Shuvo	Kabir Bakul	Baby Naznin
2007	Tumi Acho Hridoye	"Koshto Buke Boro Koshto"	S. I. Tutul	Kabir Bakul	Baby Naznin
2007	Tumi Acho Hridoye	"Keu Dekhe Dekhuk Na"	S. I. Tutul	Kabir Bakul	Runa Laila
2008	Ek Buk Bhalobasha	"Dhire Dhire Tumi Hole Hridoyer Mehman"	Alam Khan	Kabir Bakul	Kanak Chapa
2009	Bolbo Kotha Bashor Ghore	"Bolbo Kotha Bashor Ghore"	Shawkat Ali Emon	Kabir Bakul	Kanak Chapa
2009	Mon Jekhane Hridoy Sekhane	"Shada Kagojer Moto"			Sabina Yasmin
2009	Mon Diyechi Tomake	"Badhbo Bhalobashar Ghor"			Mimi
2009	Rastar Chele	"Kichu Somoy"	Shawkat Ali Emon	Kabir Bakul	Dinat Jahan Munni
2009	Mone Boro Kosto	"Dhak Dhak Kore Buker Bhetor"	Shawkat Ali Emon	Kabir Bakul	Ronti Das
2009	O Sathii Re	"Ekta Mon Sarakhon"	Ali Akram Shuvo		Dinat Jahan Munni
2009	Shaheb Name Golam	"Shurovi, Tumi Amar Madhobi"	Gazi Mazharul Anwar	Emon Saha	Anima
2010	Bolo Na Tumi Amar	"Beautiful Beautiful"			Doly Sayontoni
2010	Abar Ekti Juddho	"Aaj Holo Budhbar"			Baby Naznin
2013	Tomar Majhe Ami	"Tomar Majhe Ami" (Title Track)			Kanak Chapa
2014	Hero: The Superstar	"Dekhe Tor Mayabi Hasi"	Ali Akram Shuvo	Kabir Bakul	Mimi Naznin
2015	Antaranga	"Muri Chanachur"			Ronti
2015	Podmo Patar Jol	"Alokito Sharadin"			Porshi
2015	Rajababu: The Power	"Selfie"	Ali Akram Shuvo, Aryan Ashik		solo
N/A	Devdas	"Moneri Aynate"	N/A	N/A	solo
