= Abraham-César Lamoureux =

French sculptor and stonemason

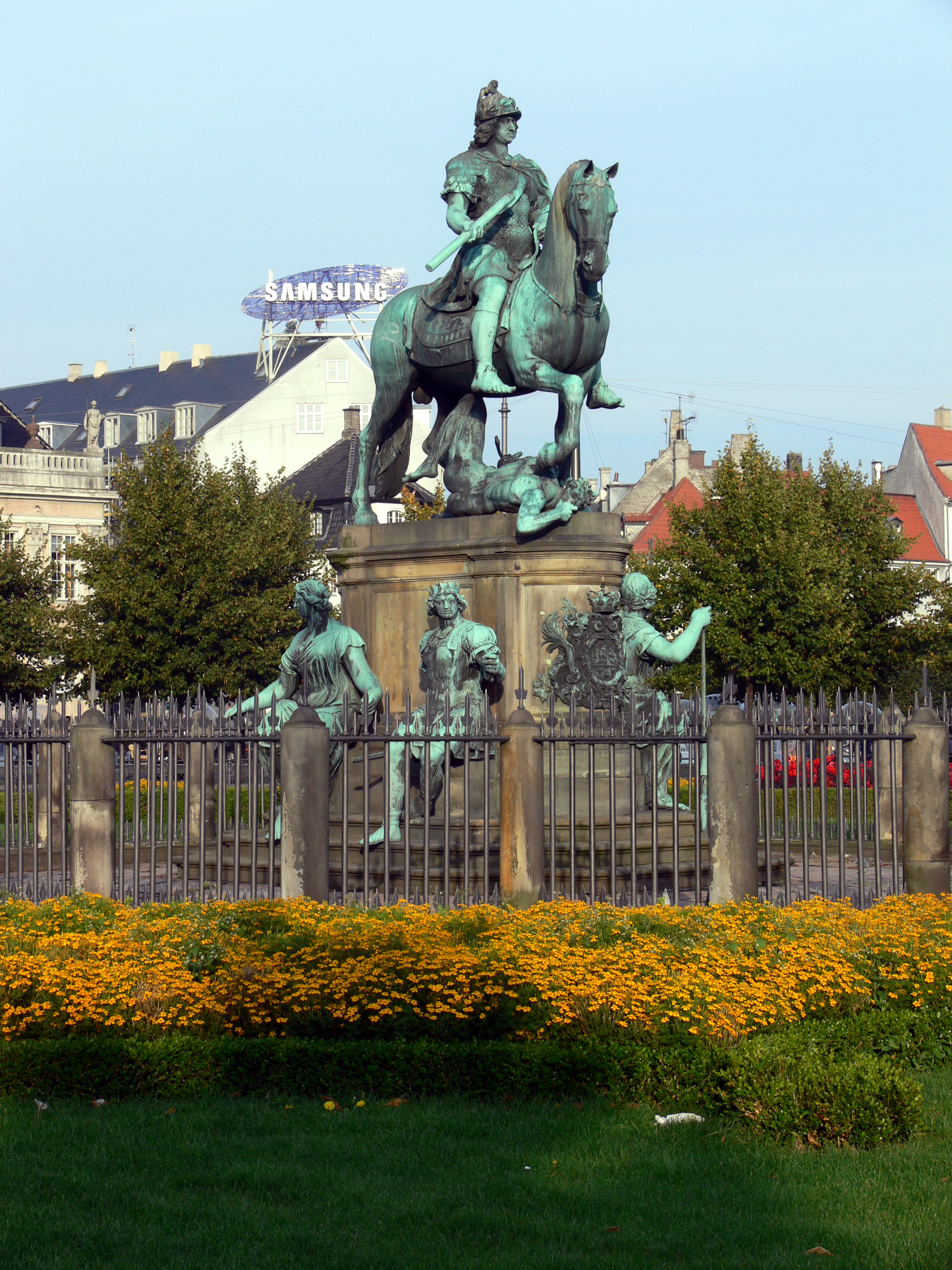
- Equestrian statue of Christian V (bronze copy) at Kongens Nytorv, Copenhagen
- Born: between c. 1640 and 1650; Metz, France
- Died: April 1692; Copenhagen, Denmark
- Resting place: Trinitatis Church, Copenhagen, Denmark
- Known for: Sculpture
- Notable work: Equestrian statue of king Christian V, Copenhagen
- Style: Baroque sculpture
- Spouse: Anna Thiel
- Patrons: Magnus Gabriel De la Gardie; Hedwig Eleonora of Holstein-Gottorp; Christian V of Denmark

Abraham César Lamoureux (c. 1640, Metz – c. April 1692, Copenhagen) was a French sculptor and stonemason who worked in Sweden and in Copenhagen, Denmark. He is best known for creating the first equestrian statue in northern Europe.

== Life and work ==
Little is known about Lamoureux's early years. He was born in Metz in the Lorraine region of France, and he had a younger brother Claude, also a sculptor, as well as a younger sister Magdalena, who was born in Hamburg (Germany) around 1660. Their father, whose first name is unknown, was a sculptor who had worked in the Netherlands, in England and in Hamburg, and might have been an assistant of the sculptor François Dieussart. Lamoureux first appears around 1664 in Stockholm with his stepfather, the sculptor Jean Baptiste Dieussart, when the latter entered service with count Magnus Gabriel De la Gardie, the Lord High Chancellor of Sweden, who was his stepfather's main employer and patron until around 1668. In the same year Lamoureux's mother, who was originally from Antwerp, died in Stockholm. In the years before 1668, Lamoureux (and presumably also his brother Claude) is believed to have been an apprentice or assistant of his stepfather.

Around 1670 he was an apprentice of the sculptor Nicolaes Millich and lived with him in Stockholm's Bonde Palace, but absconded to Güstrow to his stepfather's brother Charles Philippe Dieussart, who at the time was court architect and sculptor of Duke Gustav Adolph of Mecklenburg, and in 1671 Lamoureux, like his stepfather before him, entered the service of count Magnus Gabriel De la Gardie.

Early in 1675 Lamoureux married Anna Thiel, a daughter of Hans Thiel, farrier and Elder of the guild of weaponsmiths, and in 1677 he became court sculptor for Queen Hedvig Eleonora at Jakobsdal Palace, in September 1678 he was contracted by his former employer, De la Gardie, to create sculptures of two seahorses, a Neptune and a dragon for Karlberg Palace.

In 1681, Abraham César Lamoureux and his family, including his brother Claude his sister Magdalena and her husband, the Swedish sculptor and stonemason Johann Gustav Stockenberg, moved to Copenhagen in Denmark (it has been speculated that Lamoureux was convinced to leave Swedish Service by Jens Juel) to become court sculptor for Christian V of Denmark, where he received an annual salary of 400 rigsdalers, which was topped up by an additional 200 rigsdalers from 1685. He is likely to have started work on the Equestrian statue of Christian V around 1682, when he first purchased materials for its creation, and 1687 its installation on Kongens Nytorv was witnessed by Nicodemus Tessin the Younger.

Abraham César Lamoureux died in Copenhagen around April 1692 where he was buried in the Trinitatis Church on 27 April 1692.

== Most important works ==
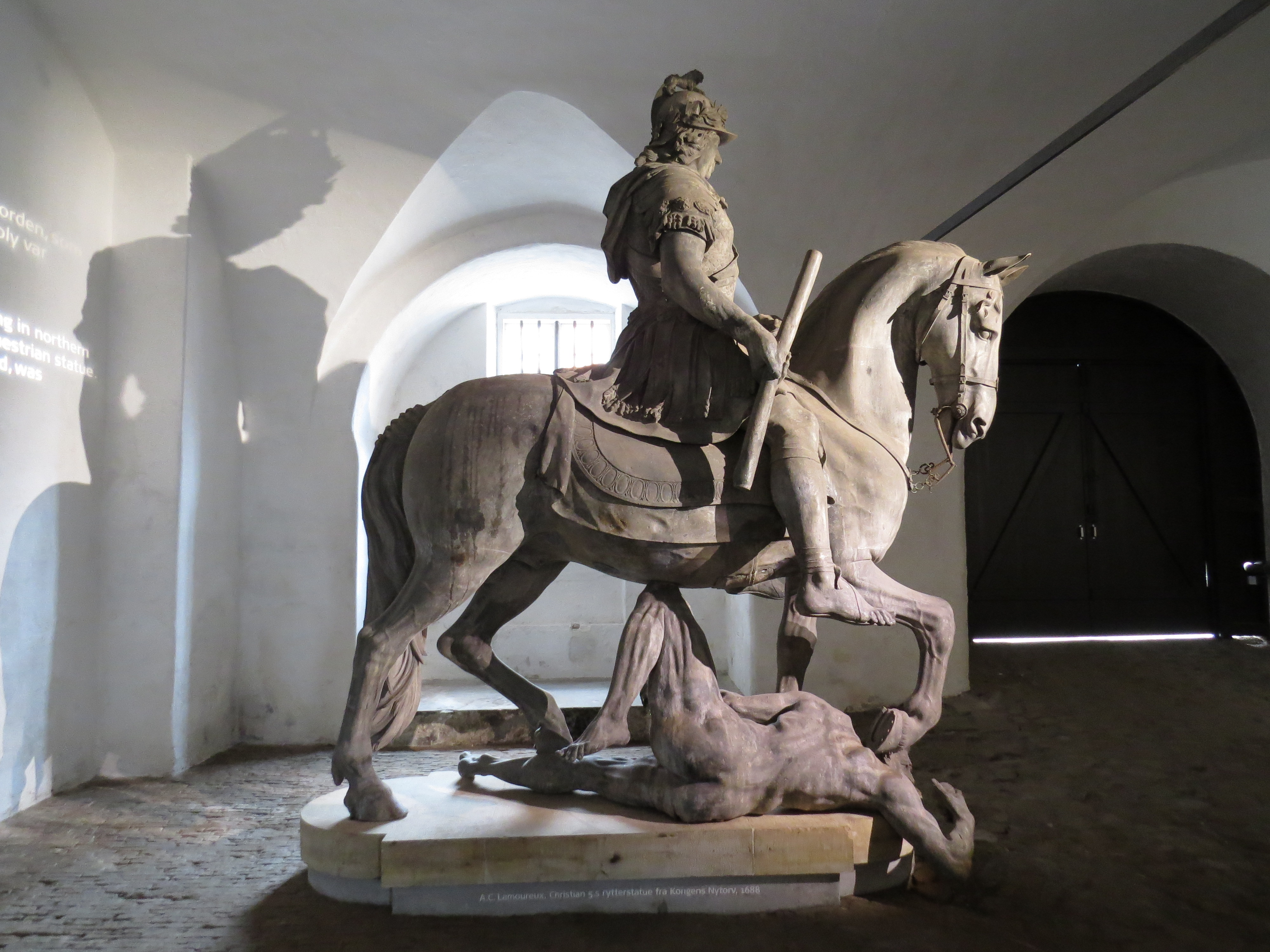
Original equestrian statue of Christian V, now displayed in The Lapidarium of Kings museum, Christian IV's Brewhouse, Copenhagen

Unfortunately there do not seem to be any works completed by Lamoureux in Sweden that still exist. All of his known surviving works are located in Denmark:

- the Equestrian statue of Christian V, based on French statues inspired by the Equestrian Statue of Marcus Aurelius, erected between 1687 and 1688 at Kongens Nytorv and originally made from gilded lead— the statue required frequent repairs due to metal fatigue caused by the softness of the lead, so the original statue was recast in bronze by Einar Utzon-Frank between 1939 and 1942
- a marble bas-relief portrait medallion of king Christian V at Rosenborg Castle

=== Attributed works ===
A number of other works have been attributed to Lamoureux. Among these are:

- a marble bas-relief portrait medallion of Christian V at Gisselfeld
- a Hercules statue from around 1691 at Borchs Kollegium, clearly inspired by the Farnese Hercules

== Literature ==
- Hans Vollmer [in German], ed. (1928), "Lamoureux, französ. Bildhauerfamilie", Allgemeines Lexikon der bildenden Künstler von der Antike bis zur Gegenwart (in German), vol. 22, Leipzig: E. A. Seemann, p. 270
- Birgitte B. Johannsen; V. Thorlacius-Ussing (1979–1984), "Abraham César Lamoureux", Dansk Biografisk Leksikon (in Danish) (3rd ed.), Copenhagen: Gyldendal
- "Lamoureux, Abraham-César", Svenskt konstnärslexikon (in Swedish), vol. III, Malmö: Allhems Förlag AB, 1957, p. 449, LIBRIS ID: 8390296
- Frederik Julius Meier [in Danish] (1887), "l'Amoureux Abraham César", in Carl Frederik Bricka (ed.), Dansk Biografisk Leksikon (in Danish), vol. I. BIND Aaberg - Beaumelle, Copenhagen: Gyldendalske Boghandels Forlag, p. 196
