= Dieussart =

Dieussart is a surname. Notable people with the surname include:

- Charles Philippe Dieussart (c. 1625–1696), Dutch architect and sculptor
- François Dieussart (c. 1600–1661), Walloon sculptor
- Jean Baptiste Dieussart (c. 1630 – after c. 1683), Flemish sculptor
