= Claude Lamoureux =

French sculptor

- Born: c. 1650
- Died: after 1699
- Known for: Sculpture
- Notable work: Allegorical statues for the Equestrian statue of king Christian V, Copenhagen
- Style: Baroque sculpture
- Spouse: Anne Marie Pedersdatter Stephensen
- Patrons: Christian V of Denmark

Claude Lamoureux (c. 1650 – after 1699) was a French sculptor who worked in Sweden and in Copenhagen, Denmark. He is best known for assisting his brother with the creation of the first equestrian statue in northern Europe.

== Life and work ==
The date and place of the birth of Claude Lamoureux are unknown. He was the younger brother of the sculptor Abraham-César Lamoureux, and he had a younger sister Magdalena, who was born in Hamburg (Germany) around 1660.

He probably came to Sweden with his stepfather Jean Baptiste Dieussart, who in 1664 entered service with count Magnus Gabriel De la Gardie, the Lord High Chancellor of Sweden. Lamoureux, like his brother, was probably an apprentice or assistant of his stepfather.

In 1681, Lamoureux as well as his siblings and their families (his brother's family and his sister's husband, the Swedish sculptor and stonemason Johann Gustav Stockenberg) moved to Copenhagen in Denmark, where his brother Abraham-César was employed as court sculptor for Christian V of Denmark.

Around 1685, Lamoureux married Anne Marie Pedersdatter Stephensen, a local woman, with whom he had four known children between 1686 and 1698. From 1686 he was employed as his brother's assistant, receiving an annual salary of 100 rigsdalers. After his brother's death around April 1692 (Abraham-César was buried in Copenhagen's Trinitatis Church on 27 April 1692) he completed his brother's work, adding four allegorical statues to the Pedestal of the Equestrian statue of Christian V in 1695.

In 1699, Lamoureux left the service of the Danish court and was paid the expenses for leaving Denmark. What became of him afterwards is unknown, as are the date and place of his death.

== Known works ==
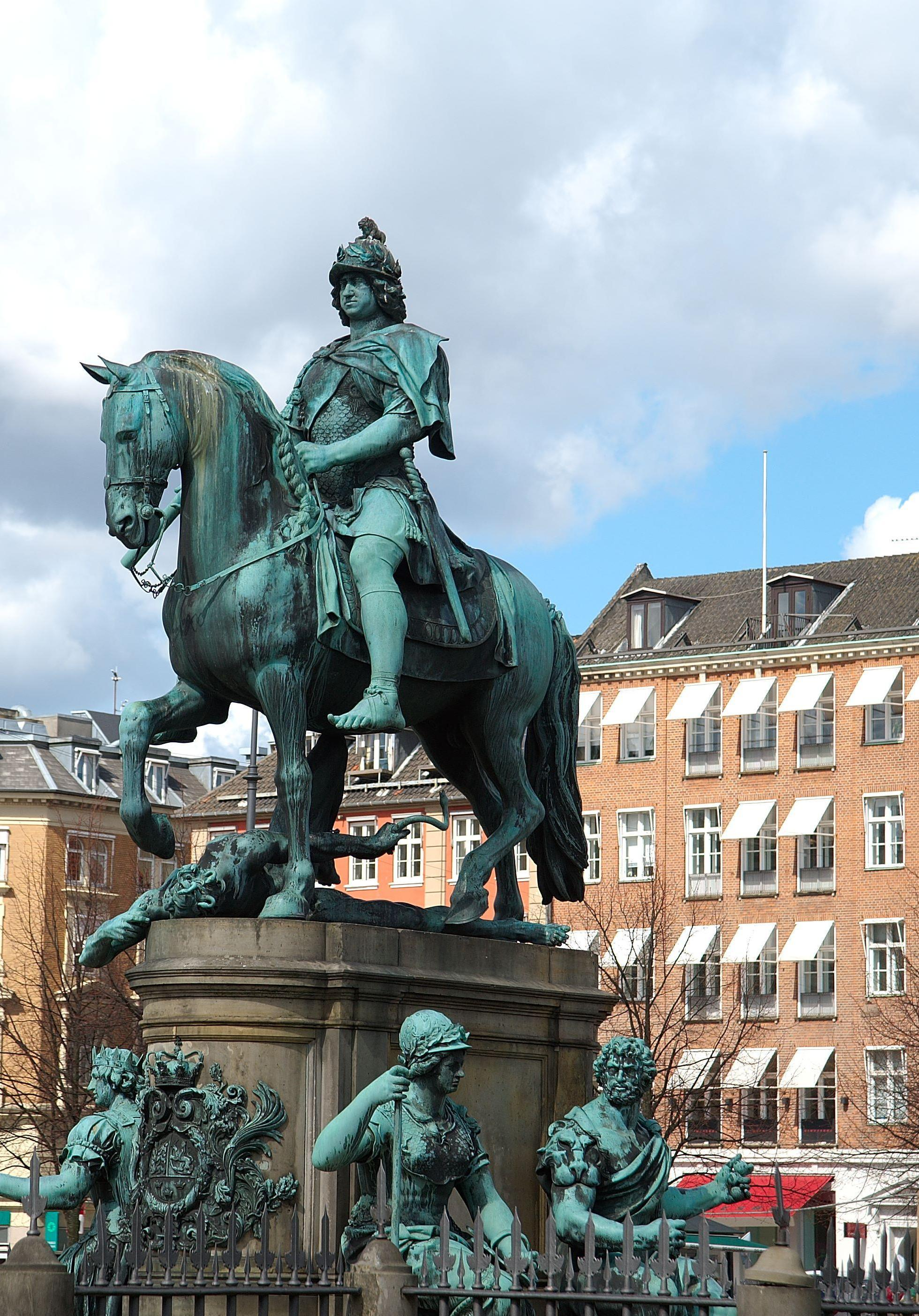
Minerva and Hercules
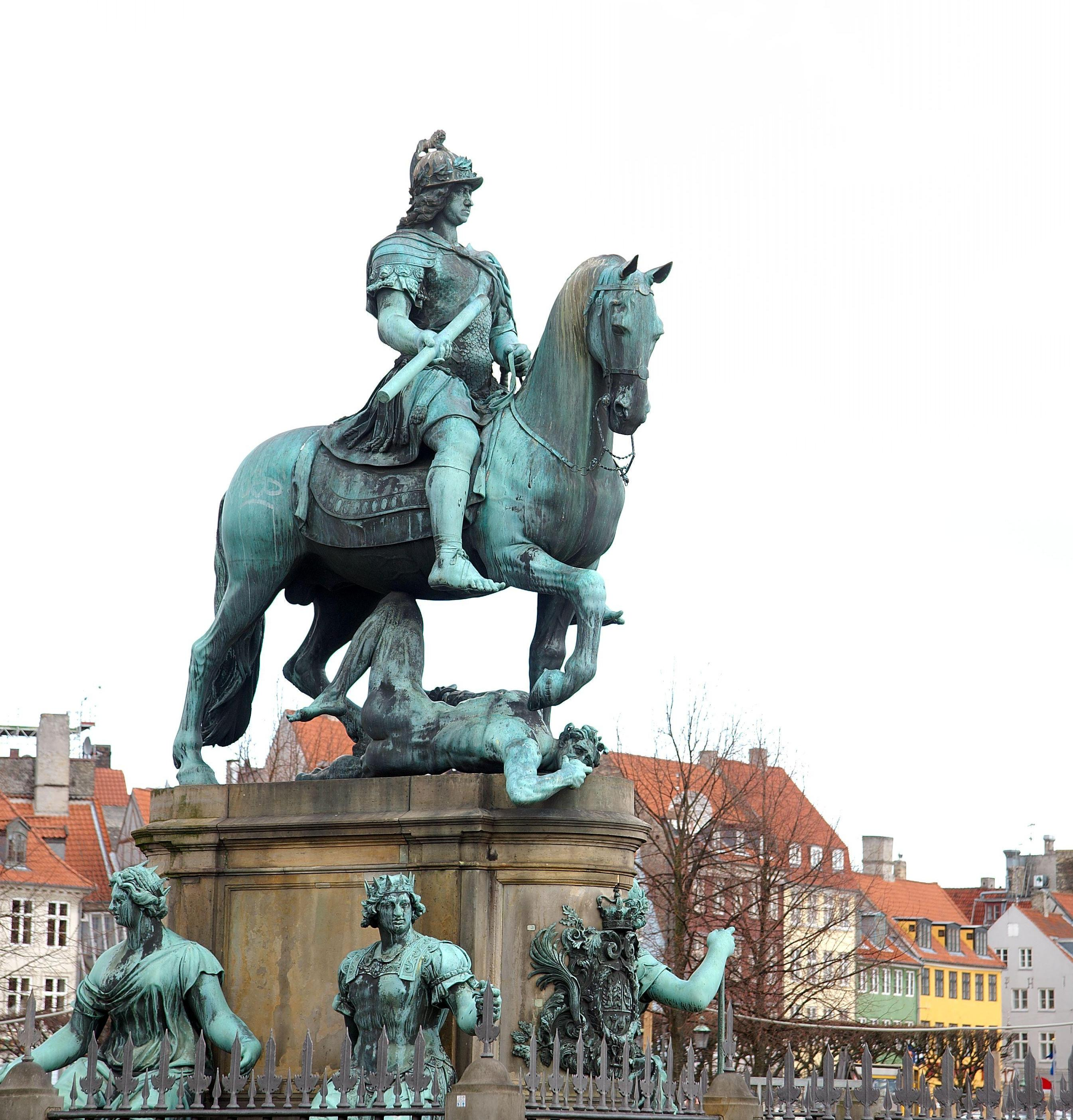
Artemisia and Alexander the Great

- the four allegorical lead statues Wisdom (Minerva), Strength (Hercules), Heroism (Alexander the Great) and Honour (Artemisia) surrounding the pedestal of the Equestrian statue of Christian V at Kongens Nytorv

== Literature ==
- Hans Vollmer [in German], ed. (1928), "Lamoureux, französ. Bildhauerfamilie", Allgemeines Lexikon der bildenden Künstler von der Antike bis zur Gegenwart (in German), vol. 22, Leipzig: E. A. Seemann, p. 270
- Philip Weilbach (1877), "L'Amoureux. Claude L'Amoureux", Dansk Konstnerlexikon (in Danish), Copenhagen: Andr. Fred. Høst & Søn, p. 32
