= Weilbach =

Weilbach may refer to:

- Weilbach, Austria, a municipality in Upper Austria
- Weilbach, Germany, a municipality in Bavaria
- Weilbach (Main), a river of Hesse, Germany
- Weilbachs Kunstnerleksikon, a Danish biographical dictionary of artists and architect
- Iver C. Weilbach & Co. A/S, a Danish provider of nautical charts and publications for the shipping industry
- Weilbach or Bad Weilbach, districts of the town Flörsheim am Main, Hesse, Germany
- Philip Weilbach (1834–1900), Danish art historian and encyclopedian, worked on Weilbachs Kunstnerleksikon
