= Dusart =

Dusart is a surname. Notable people with the surname include:

- Pierre Dusart, French mathematician
- Cornelis Dusart (1660–1704), Dutch painter, draftsman, and printmaker
- Jean Baptiste Dusart (Dieussart) (born c. 1630), Dutch sculptor
