= Equestrian statue of Christian V =

Public sculpture in Copenhagen

Coordinates: 55°40′50″N 12°35′09″E

Christian V
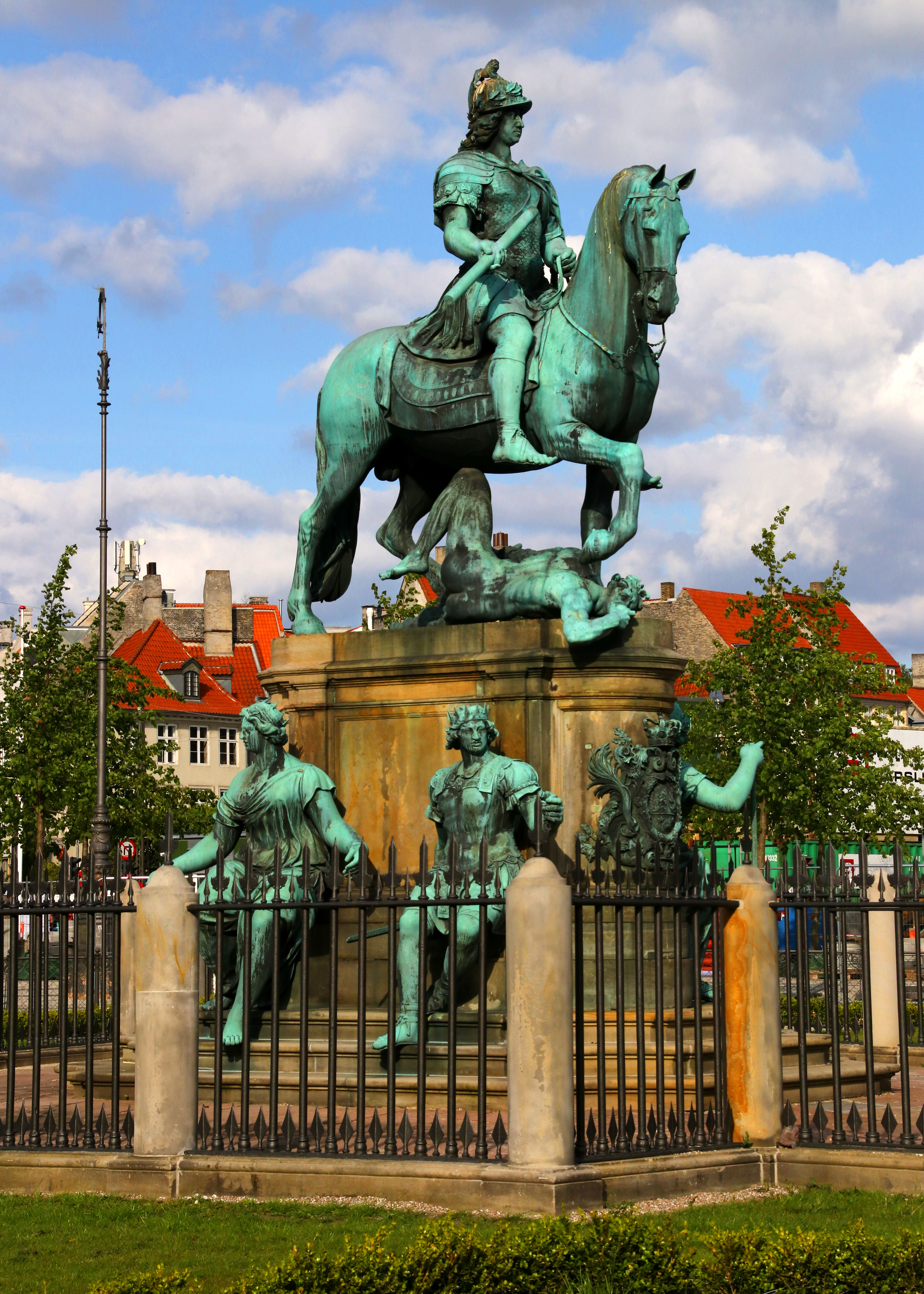
- The statue in 2008
- Artist: Abraham-César Lamoureux
- Year: 1688; 338 years ago
- Type: Bronze equestrian statue
- Location: Copenhagen, Denmark

The equestrian statue of Christian V, located in the centre of Kongens Nytorv, is the oldest of five equestrian statues of Danish monarchs in Copenhagen, Denmark. The equestrian statue was created by the French sculptor Abraham-César Lamoureux, inspired by French equestrian statues that had themselves been based on the Equestrian Statue of Marcus Aurelius. Dating from 1688, it was originally made in gilded lead but recast in bronze in 1939.

== Description ==
With direct inspiration from the equestrian statue of Louis XIII at the centre of Place des Vosges, it depicts the king dressed like a Roman imperator with a Laurel wreathed helmet.

The plinth is surrounded by four allegorical statues. Facing Charlottenborg Palace stand two figures of Minerva and Herkules, representing prudence and strength, while the opposite side features statues of Alexander the Great and Artemisia, personifications of fortitude and honour.

Even though Lamoureux depicted the horse in a trot-like gait, with inspiration from Marcus Aurelius' horse at the Capitoline Hill, the design caused severe problems due to the soft metal used for the casting. The construction therefore had to be strengthened, and Lamoureux introduced a figure of a naked man crouched underneath the horse's hoof, personifying envy but at the same time affording support for the horse's barrel as the weakest point of the statue.

== History ==
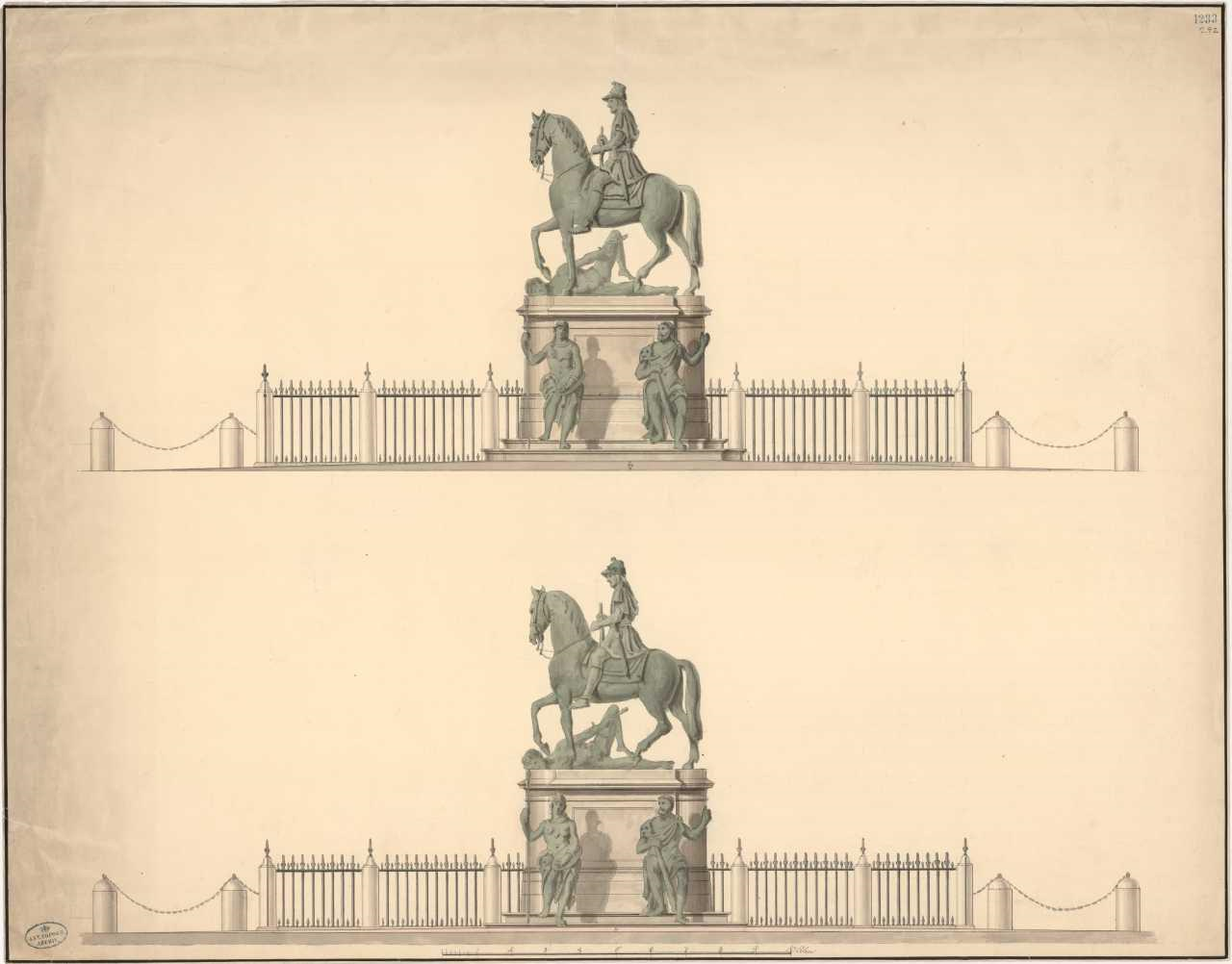
Drawing of the statue..

Shortly after Christian V was crowned in 1670, Kongens Nytorv was laid out as a place royale with inspiration from France. Land around the new square was distributed among interested wealthy citizens, including people from the new ranks. Buildings facing the square were required to have at least two stories and meet certain standards. The French sculptor Abraham-César Lamoureux was commissioned to create an equestrian statue of Christian V for the centre of the square.

In 1688, a Baroque garden complex with trees around a parterre and the gilded equestrian statue of Christian V in its centre, was inaugurated. In 1747 the entire square was rebuilt by Frederik V as a military drill and ceremony ground for the King's troops, which was used until 1908, when the square was re-shaped to its original design.

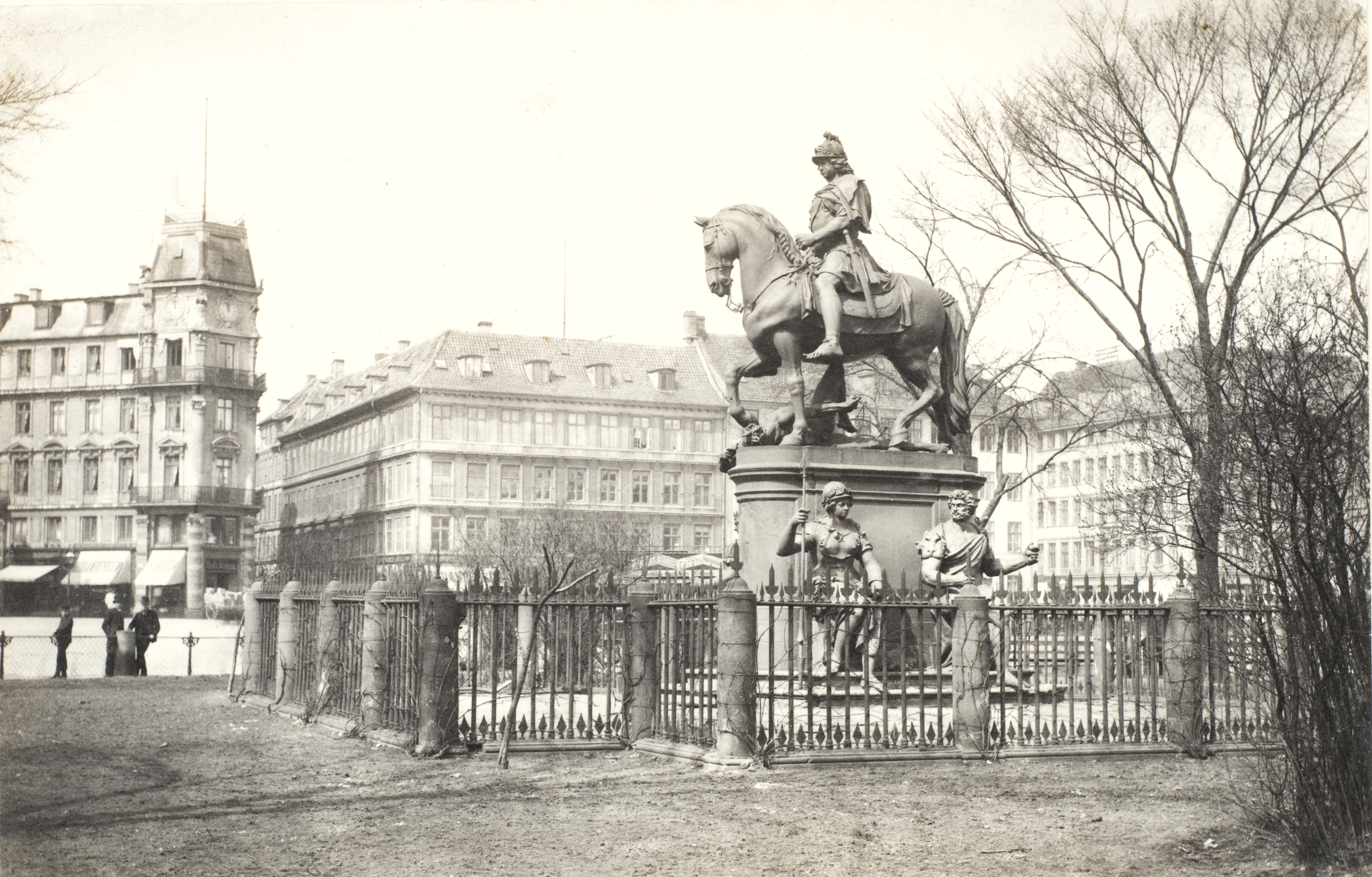
The statue photographed by Frederik Riise in 1888.

The equestrian statue was created in gilded lead. Over the centuries the soft metal used for casting the statue resulted in problems, particularly with the horse's front left leg, and finally Professor Einar Utzon-Frank from the Danish Academy of Fine Arts was commissioned to recast the statue in bronze. This happened from 1939 to 1942 and the new cast was reinaugurated on 22 May 1946.
