= Iver C. Weilbach & Co. =

Weilbach A/S, formerly Iver C. Weilbach & Co., is a provider of software, nautical charts and publications for the shipping industry. It is headquartered at Firskovvej 36, Lyngby in Copenhagen, Denmark, and has subsidiaries in Singapore and Canada, with three offices in Egypt - Port Said, Alexandria and Suez. Dating from 1755, Weilbach A/S is among the oldest, existing maritime supplier companies in the world.

== History ==
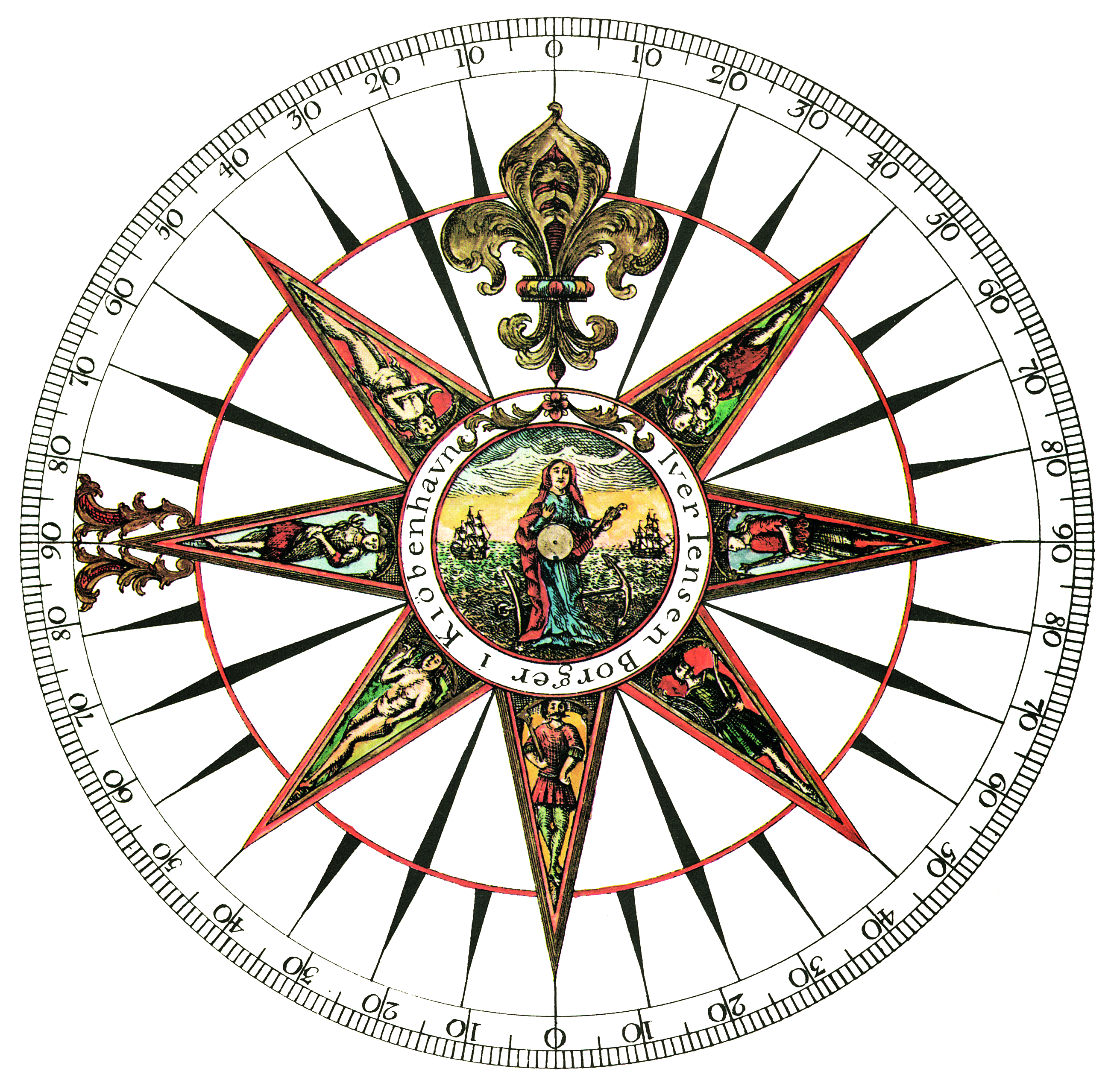
A compass rose made at Iver Jensen Borger's shop in 1760

Established in 1755, Weilbach is one of the oldest maritime suppliers in the world.

Weilbach was established by Iver Jensen Borger, a seafarer with working experience from the Danish long-haul trades with India. Borger settled in Copenhagen, Denmark and used his nautical expertise to set up a flag, sail and compass maker shop. His shop produced nautical instruments and sails for the growing Danish merchant fleet and navy, and it benefitted from the growth of the long-distance trades from Copenhagen in the latter half of the eighteenth century. In 1799, Borger died, and his son-in-law, Johan Philip Weilbach, who introduced the Weilbach name, took over the business.

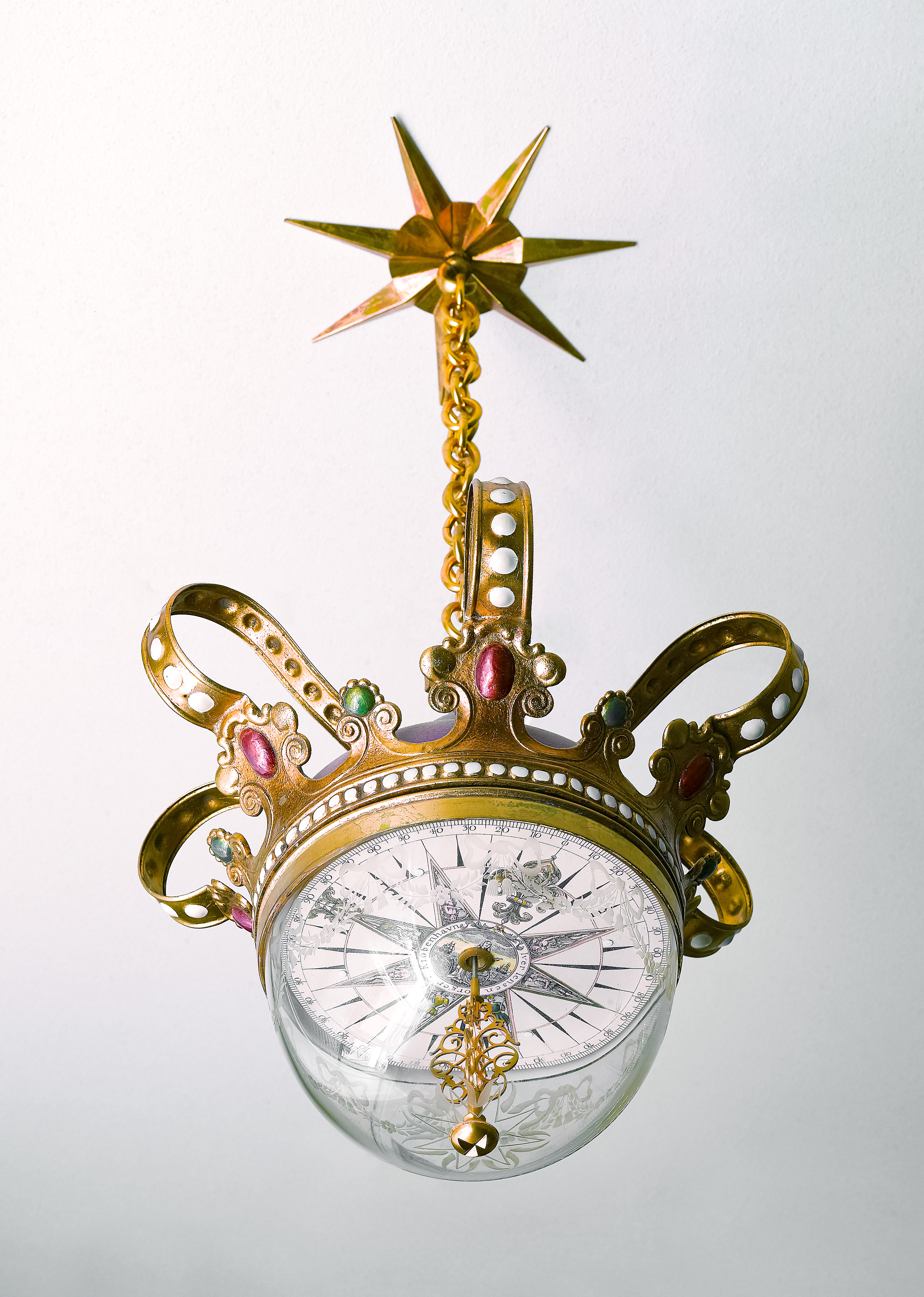
A tell-tale crown compass produced at Iver Jensen Borger's shop in 1760. Hanging in the captains cabin, the compass enabled him to follow the movements of the vessel from there.

At the beginning of the nineteenth century, market conditions turned markedly worse for Weilbach. Denmark got involved in the Napoleonic Wars, which caused a decline in the Danish overseas trade and the Copenhagen merchant fleet. The fleet did not recover after the end of hostilities in 1814, but Weilbach stayed in business, as the family fostered several generations of able managers with nautical expertise.

In the second half of the nineteenth century, steam ships with iron and steel hulls gradually replaced wooden sailing ships. Weilbach responded to these changes by diversifying into the business of compass adjustments. Iron and steel hulls influenced magnetic compasses, causing deviations, and the compass adjusters would correct for this. At the same time, the Weilbach family split the compass and sail maker business between two brothers, Iver C. Weilbach and Johannes Sophus Vilhelm Weilbach. Iver C. Weilbach took over the nautical instrument business, which benefitted from the growth of Copenhagen’s steam shipping companies and the advent of steel shipbuilding in Denmark. Iver C. Weilbach’s shop became the basis for present day Weilbach. The other branch of the Weilbach family got the sail maker business, and gradually shifted away from shipping markets to the production of tents and tarpaulin in response to the decline of sailing shipping.

In the early 1900s, Weilbach successfully transformed from a family business into a company owned by professional managers. Iver C. Weilbach recruited able managers with nautical expertise, and they eventually took over the firm. Under the new management Weilbach diversified into publishing maritime handbooks, notably the Nautical Almanac and the Fisheries’ Yearbook. Weilbach also became Danish agents from several producers of nautical charts, and it started supplying nautical charts to Danish owned or built vessels.

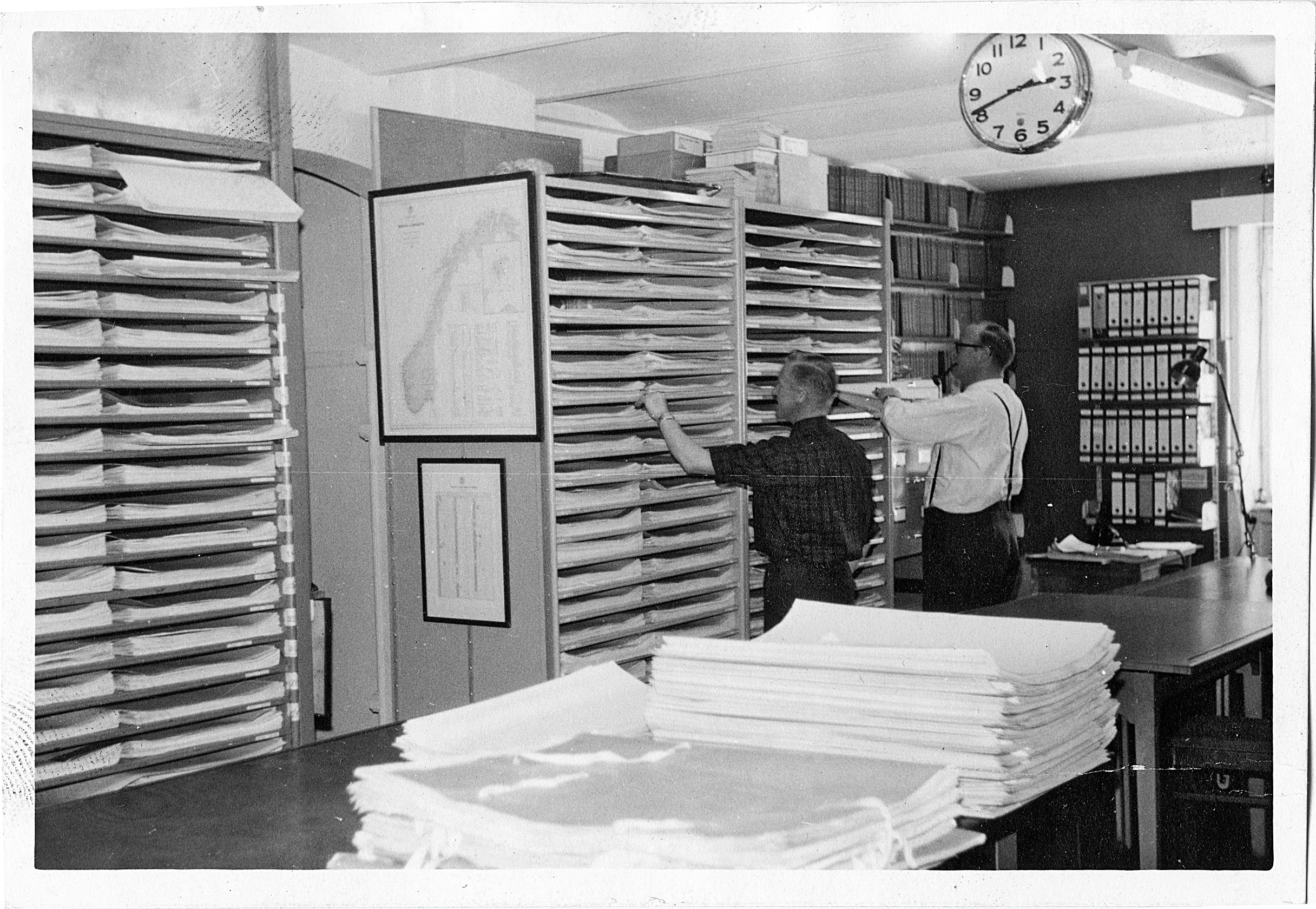
The inventory at the Weilbach office expanded in the 1950s and 1960s

In the Post World War Two era, Weilbach expanded the publishing and nautical chart businesses. It did so in response to the emergence of a comprehensive international regulatory framework for maritime safety and environmental protection. The new regulations, as adopted by the United Nations’ Inter-Governmental Maritime Consultative Organization (later renamed the International Maritime Organization), gave rise to a growing market for maritime handbook libraries onboard merchant ships. Weilbach offered both charts and handbooks on a subscription basis and guaranteed quick delivery for high-paced ship operations. About the same time, merchant ships started to use new navigation technologies of radars and other electronic equipment, developed by navies during World War Two. Gradually these technologies made magnetic compasses and other traditional nautical instruments obsolete. Weilbach found itself sidetracked in this development but maintained the production of magnetic compass until 2010.

Since 1961, the Iver C. Weilbach Foundation has been a major Weilbach shareholder, and it became the sole owner of the company in 2005. The Weilbach foundation’s purpose “is to promote and support research and education within the maritime industry. The foundation funds and supports activities and initiatives for educational institutions, research organisations and individuals engaged in maritime studies.”

After 2000, the advent of digital publishing and chart technologies represented a new break in the Weilbach history. Weilbach set up new offices in Singapore, Egypt, and Vancouver to offer round-the-clock services for customers with world-wide ship operations. At the same time, Weilbach established its own digital publishing business and entered the business of software development for digital nautical charts. It launched the WENDIS software in 2015 and two years later, it acquired the IT software company CherSoft and the subsidiary AtoBviaC. CherSoft develops nautical software applications for the UK Hydrographic Office and nautical chart users and developers.
