= Jean Baptiste Dieussart =

Flemish sculptor

- Born: c. 1630
- Died: after 1683
- Known for: Sculpture
- Notable work: Statues "Amor Dei" and "Amor Patriae" on the roof of the Riddarhuset in Stockholm
- Style: Baroque sculpture
- Patrons: Magnus Gabriel De la Gardie

Jean Baptiste Dieussart, also Jean Baptista Dusart (c. 1630 – after c. 1683) was a Flemish sculptor who worked in the Dutch Republic and mainly in Sweden. He mainly created lead statues of which only a few have survived to modern times.

== Life and work ==
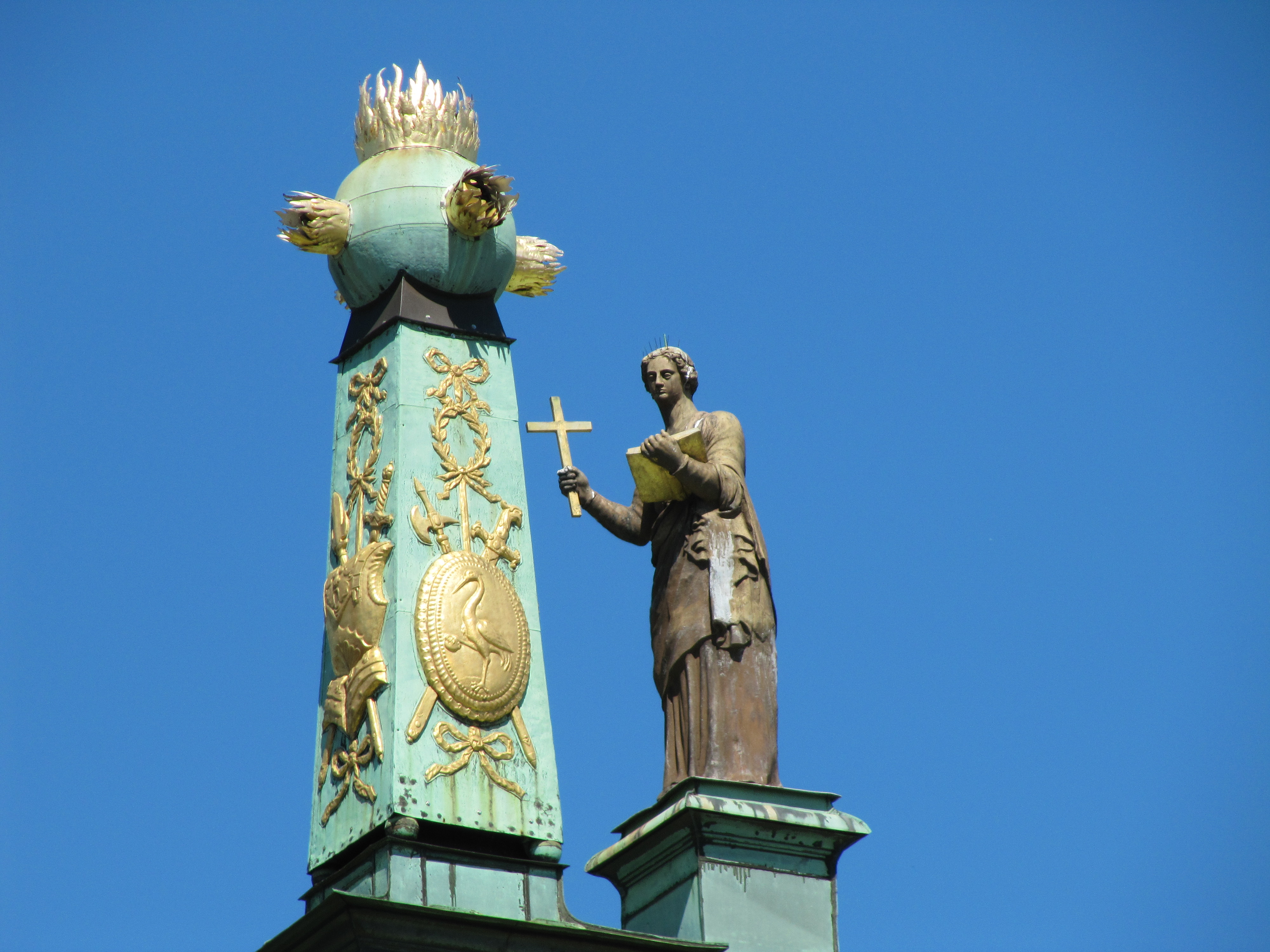
"Amor Dei" statue on the Riddarhuset roof

Dieussart may have been born in Rome (around 1630) (Note: Dieussart is believed to be a son of the sculptor François Dieussart who was working in Rome between 1622 and 1636. Supporting this is a letter written by him in which he mentioned that his father had worked for kings and princes in Germany, England and Brabant.) and was the brother of the architect and sculptor Charles Philippe Dieussart. He first appears around 1664 in Stockholm (possibly coming from Germany), when he entered service with count Magnus Gabriel De la Gardie, the Lord High Chancellor of Sweden, who was his main employer and patron until around 1668. Coming to Sweden, he was accompanied by his wife (who died in Stockholm in 1668) and his stepchildren, including Abraham-César Lamoureux and his brother Claude, who were both sculptors, as well as their sister Magdalena, who later married the sculptor Johann Gustav Stockenberg.

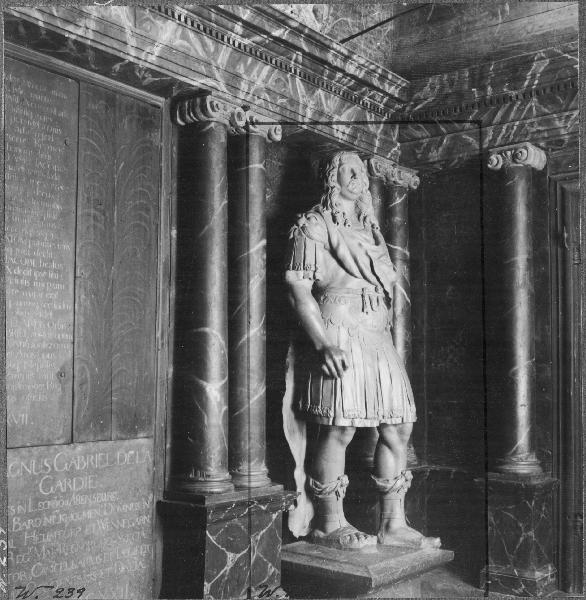
Lead statue of Magnus Gabriel De la Gardie

While Dieussart was a Baroque sculptor and one of the first representatives a free-standing style of sculpture in Sweden (some consider him Sweden's first modern sculptor), his work has been described as examples of a renaissance-like pseudo-classicism. His work consists mainly of statues, for which he used different materials, although the majority of his known works were made from lead or gilded lead. Possibly due to metal fatigue caused by the softness of the material, however, few of Dieussart's works survive.

For Läckö Castle he is known to have created busts of various members of the De la Gardie family and is also believed to be the creator of two full sized statues of Magnus Gabriel De la Gardie and his father Jakob (originally created for Karlberg Palace, where Dieussart also created decorative sculptures for the palace gardens) that were later moved there.

To decorate another palace owned by the De la Gardie family, namely Makalös palace, Dieussart created several lead statues, including a lead replica of a classical Diana statue. Probably assisted by his stepsons he created several sculptures to decorate the gardens and fountains of Jakobsdal (now Ulriksdal) Palace.

In 1667 he was contracted by De la Gardie to create a number of lead sculptures for the roof of the Riddarhuset (which was completed by the architect Jean de la Vallée between 1660 and 1674), which he delivered in 1668, and he was commissioned to complete the northern and southern portals of the building that had been begun by Heinrich Lichtenberg, which he was still working on in 1669.

His stepson Abraham-César replaced him as sculptor in De la Gardie's service between 1671 and 1672 and Dieussart is believed to have stayed in Sweden until around 1672, probably employed in his stepson's workshop, but then may have moved back to the Netherlands, appearing again in Swedish records in 1677, (Note: The sculptor Jean Baptiste Dieussart who worked in Riga (then in Swedish Livonia) between 1677 and 1679 was probably him.) and returning to the Swedish mainland around 1679, probably returning to De la Gardie's service. What became of him after 1680 is unknown, as are the date and place of his death. (Note: A different sculptor by the name of Jean Baptiste Dusart worked in Moravia from around 1695 to 1706, but the name similarity is considered to be a coincidence.)

== Most important works ==
- Lead statues "Amor Dei" and "Amor Patriae" on the roof of the Riddarhuset.
- Garden sculpture group "Perseus and Andromeda" in the park of Jakobsdal Palace (no longer existing).

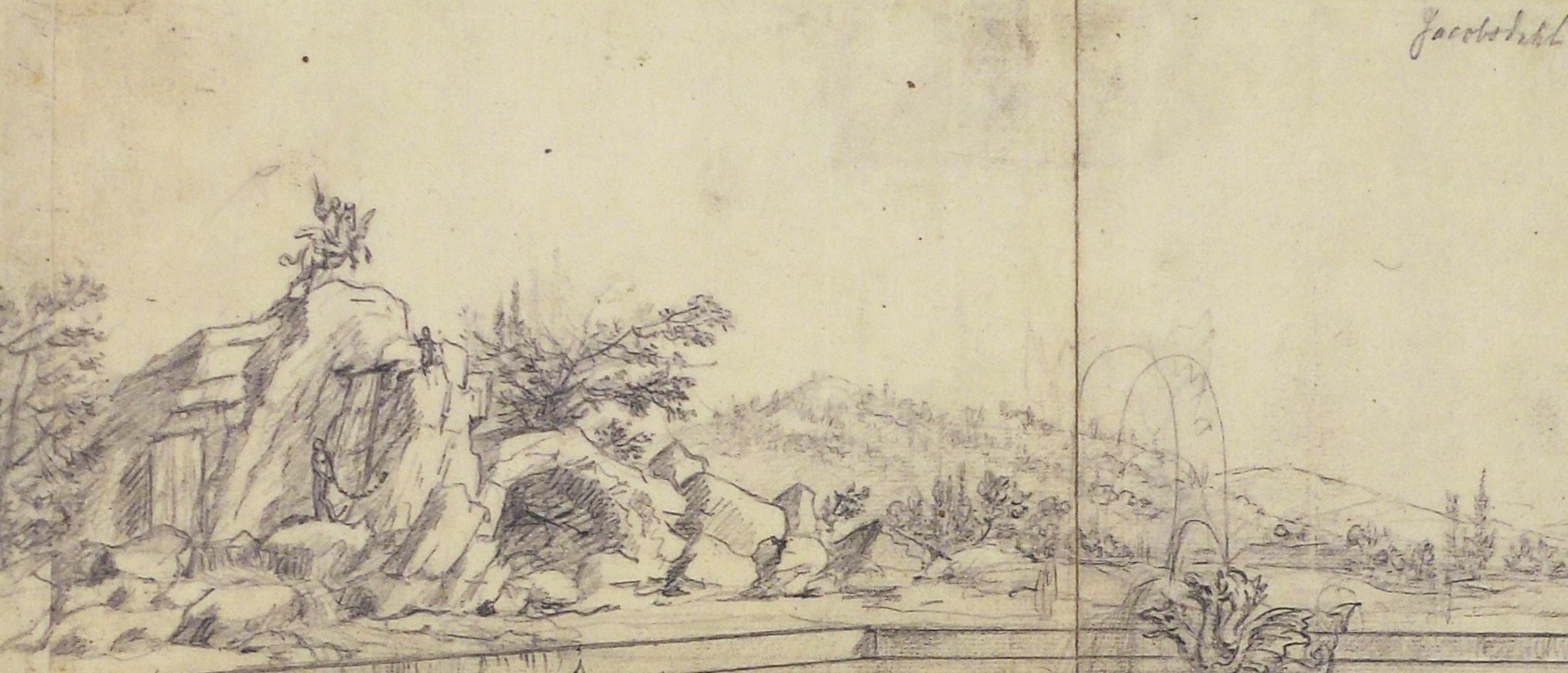
Drawing of Andromeda Cliff (Swedish: Andromedaklippan) in Ulriksdal Palace park (c. 1664) for Erik Dahlberg's Suecia Antiqua et Hodierna

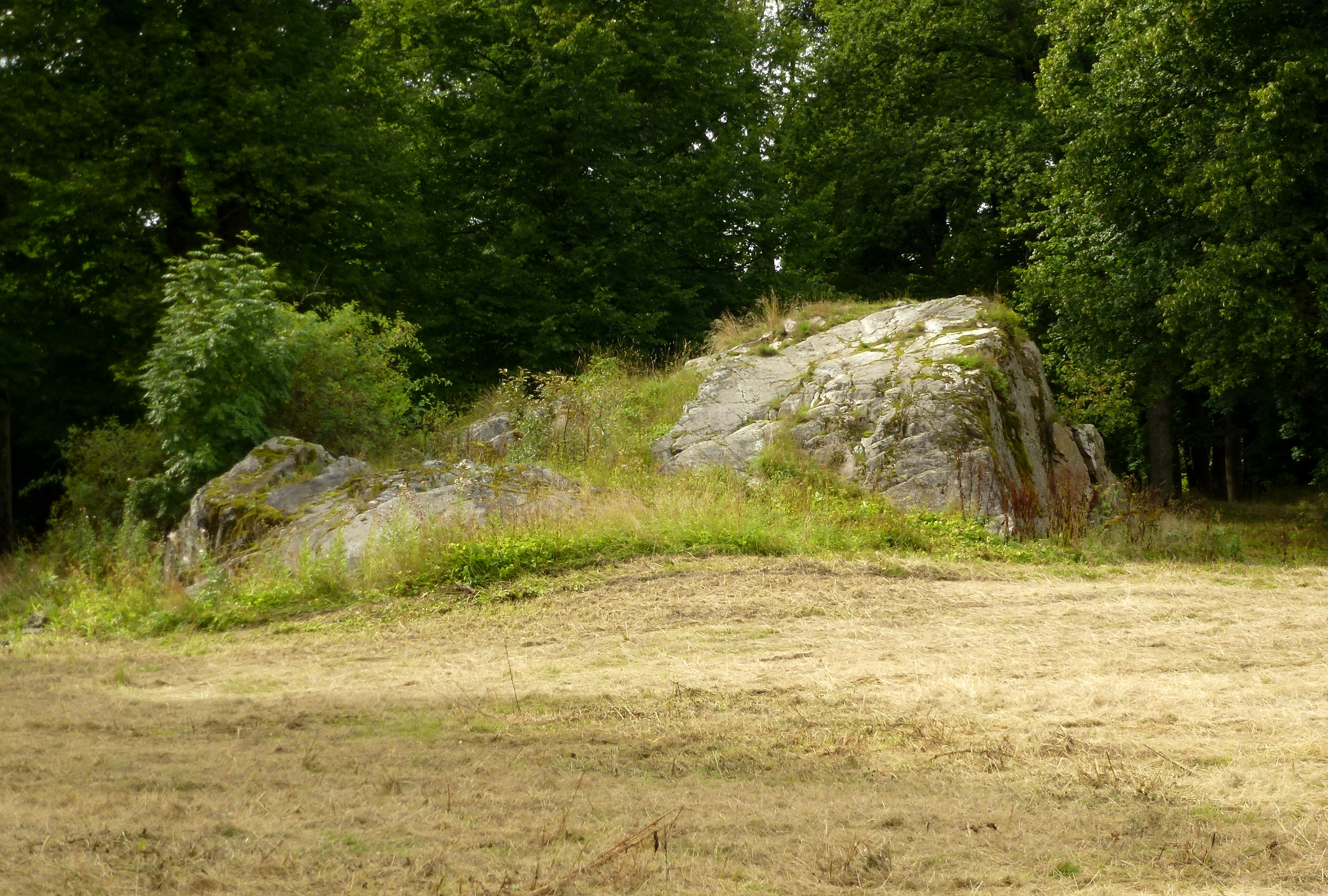
Andromeda Cliff feature (remains) in Ulriksdal Palace park

=== Attributed works ===
- Lead statues of Magnus Gabriel and Jakob De la Gardie, originally made for Karlberg Palace, then moved to Läckö Castle, but later relocated to the De la Gardie family mausoleum in Varnhem Abbey.

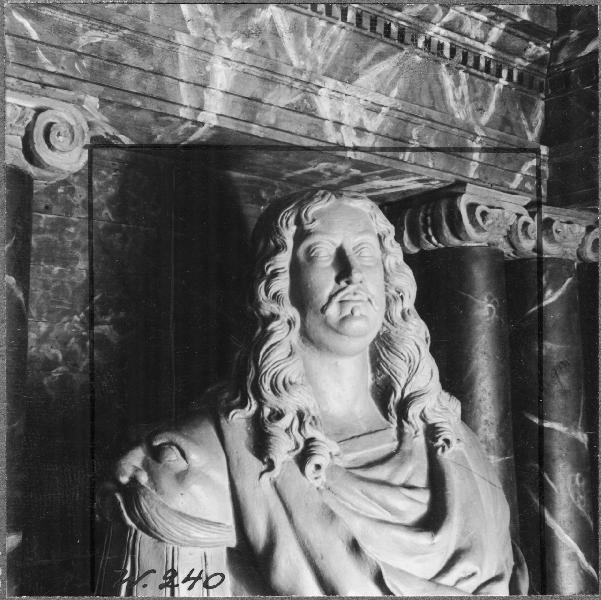
Statue of Magnus Gabriel De la Gardie in Varnhem Abbey (detail)

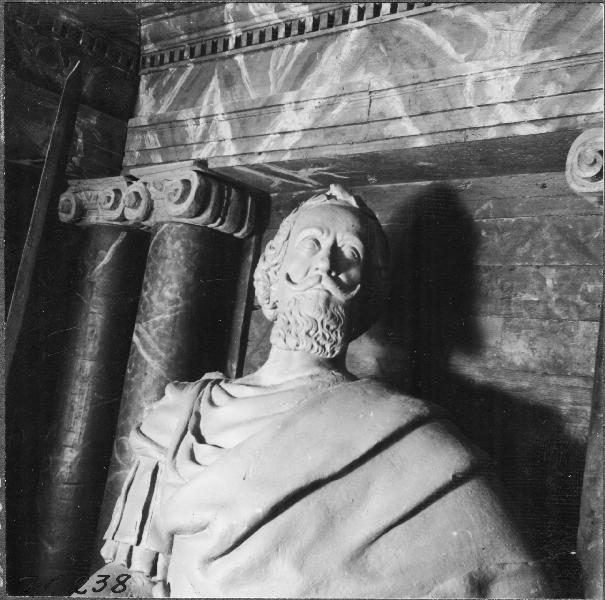
Statue of Jakob De la Gardie in Varnhem Abbey (detail)

== Literature ==
- Th. Westrin; E. Fahlstedt; V. Söderberg, eds. (1923), "Dusart I. Dieussart, Jean Baptiste", Nordisk familjebok (in Swedish), vol. 35 (2 ed.), Stockholm: Nordisk familjeboks förlags aktiebolag, p. 414
- Ulrich Thieme, ed. (1914), "Dusart (Dieussart), Jean Baptist", Allgemeines Lexikon der bildenden Künstler von der Antike bis zur Gegenwart (in German), vol. 10, Leipzig: E. A. Seemann, p. 226
