= Charles Philippe Dieussart =

Dutch Architect and Sculptor

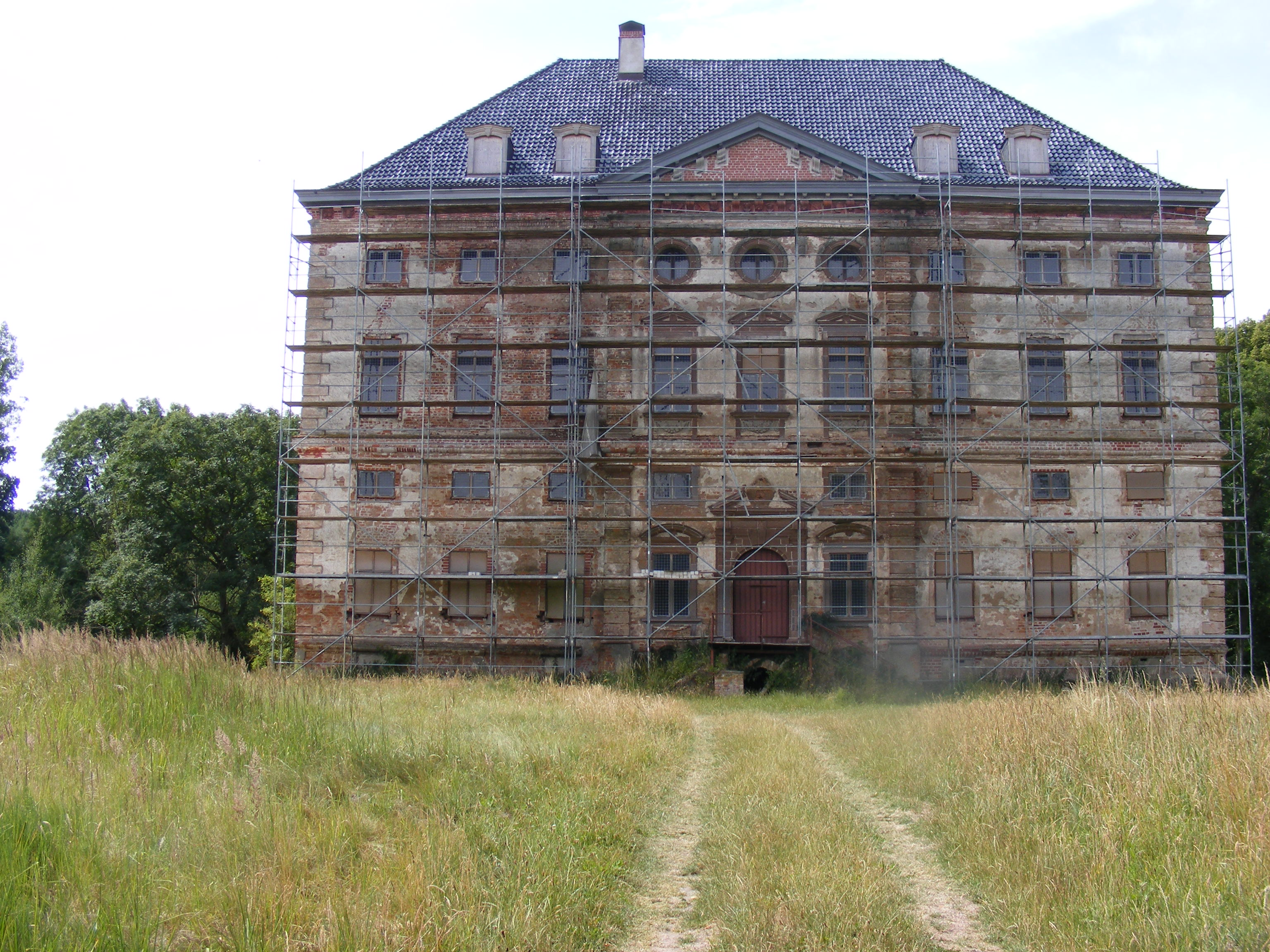
Rossewitz Castle, designed by Charles Philippe Dieussart, Laage, Mecklenburg-Vorpommern

Charles Philippe Dieussart (also Charles Philipp) (ca. 1625–1696) was a Dutch architect and sculptor, active in Germany in the second half of the seventeenth century. Most notably, he designed the Jagdschloss Glienicke, today a UNESCO World Heritage Site.

== Life ==
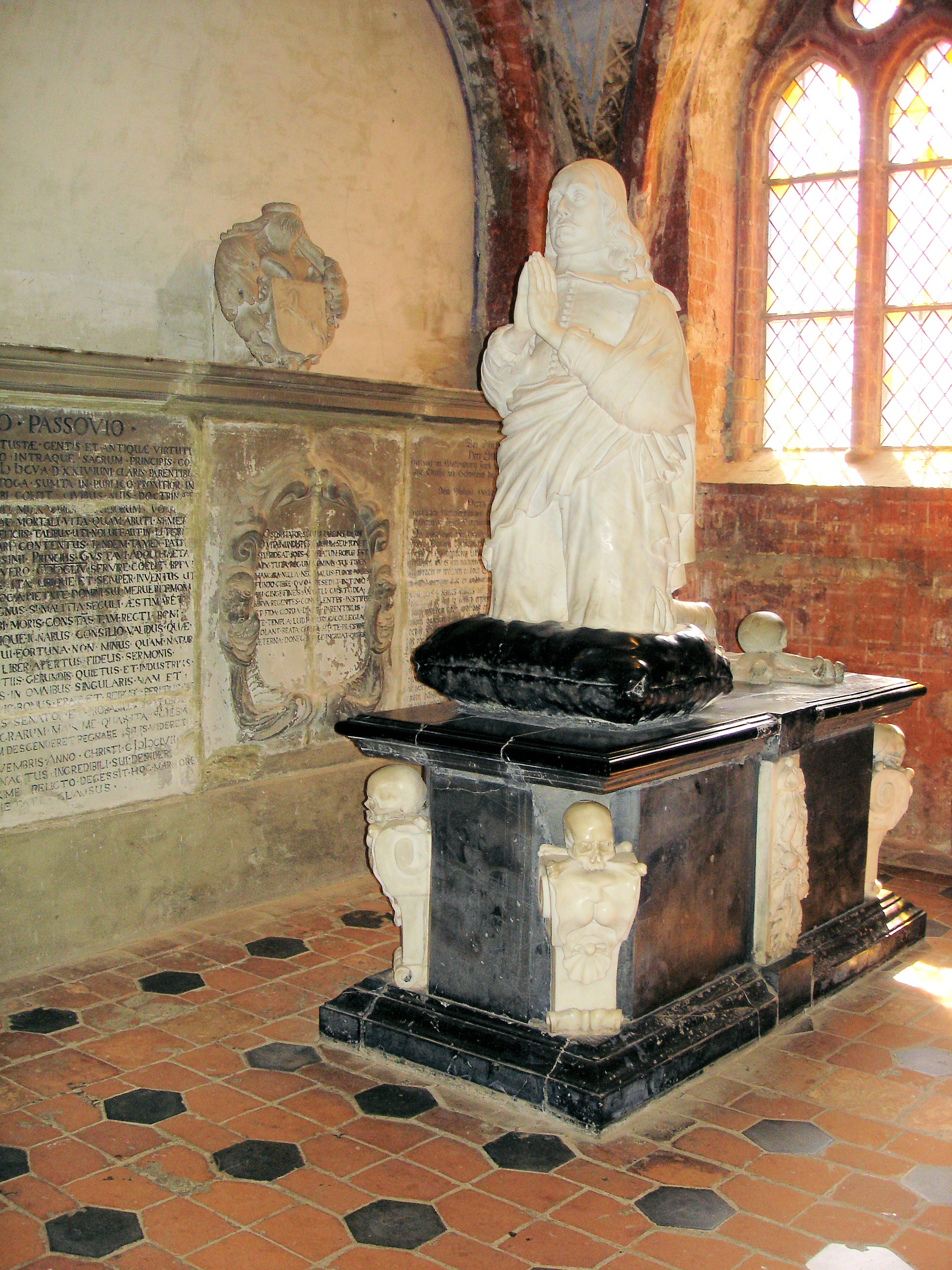
Grave monument for Günther von Passow

Dieussart was descended from French Huguenots who had moved to the Dutch Republic and is thought to have been born in Rome. (Note: In his book, Dieussart identifies himself as the author as "Carlo Philippo Deussart. Rom.", which may indicate that he was originally from Rome. He is also believed to be a son of the sculptor François Dieussart who was working in Rome between 1622 and 1636.) His brother was the sculptor Jean Baptiste Dieussart, who mainly worked in Sweden. In 1657, he entered the service of Duke Gustav Adolf of Mecklenburg-Güstrow. His first important commission, which remained among his most important contributions, was the Rossewitz Castle, the first Baroque building in Mecklenburg. Also, well-known is the tomb he designed for Günther von Passow in the Güstrow Cathedral.

He wrote the book Theatrum architecturae civilis that was published in several editions (1679 and 1682 in Güstrow, 1692 and possibly also 1695 in Bayreuth), dedicated to various of his patrons, (Note: Digitized editions: 1679 edition, dedicated to Duke Gustav Adolf of Mecklenburg-Güstrow: Theatrum architecturae civilis (in German), Güstrow: Christian Scheippel, 1679; 1679 edition, dedicated to Duke Christian Ludwig of Mecklenburg: Theatrum architecturae civilis (in German), Güstrow: Christian Scheippel, 1679; 1679 edition, dedicated to Duke of Prussia and Elector of Brandenburg Frederick William: Theatrum architecturae civilis (in German), Güstrow: Christian Scheippel, 1679; 1682 edition, dedicated to Duke of Prussia and Elector of Brandenburg Frederick William: Theatrum architecturae civilis (in German), Güstrow: Johann Spierling, 1682; 1692 edition, dedicated to Christian Ernst, Margrave of Brandenburg-Bayreuth: Theatrum architecturae civilis (in German), Bayreuth: Johann Georg Amelung, 1692) and for which the architect Leonhard Dientzenhofer commissioned a posthumous edition in Bamberg (with changed dedication and foreword) in 1697.
