= Equestrian statue of Marcus Aurelius =

Classical sculpture in Rome

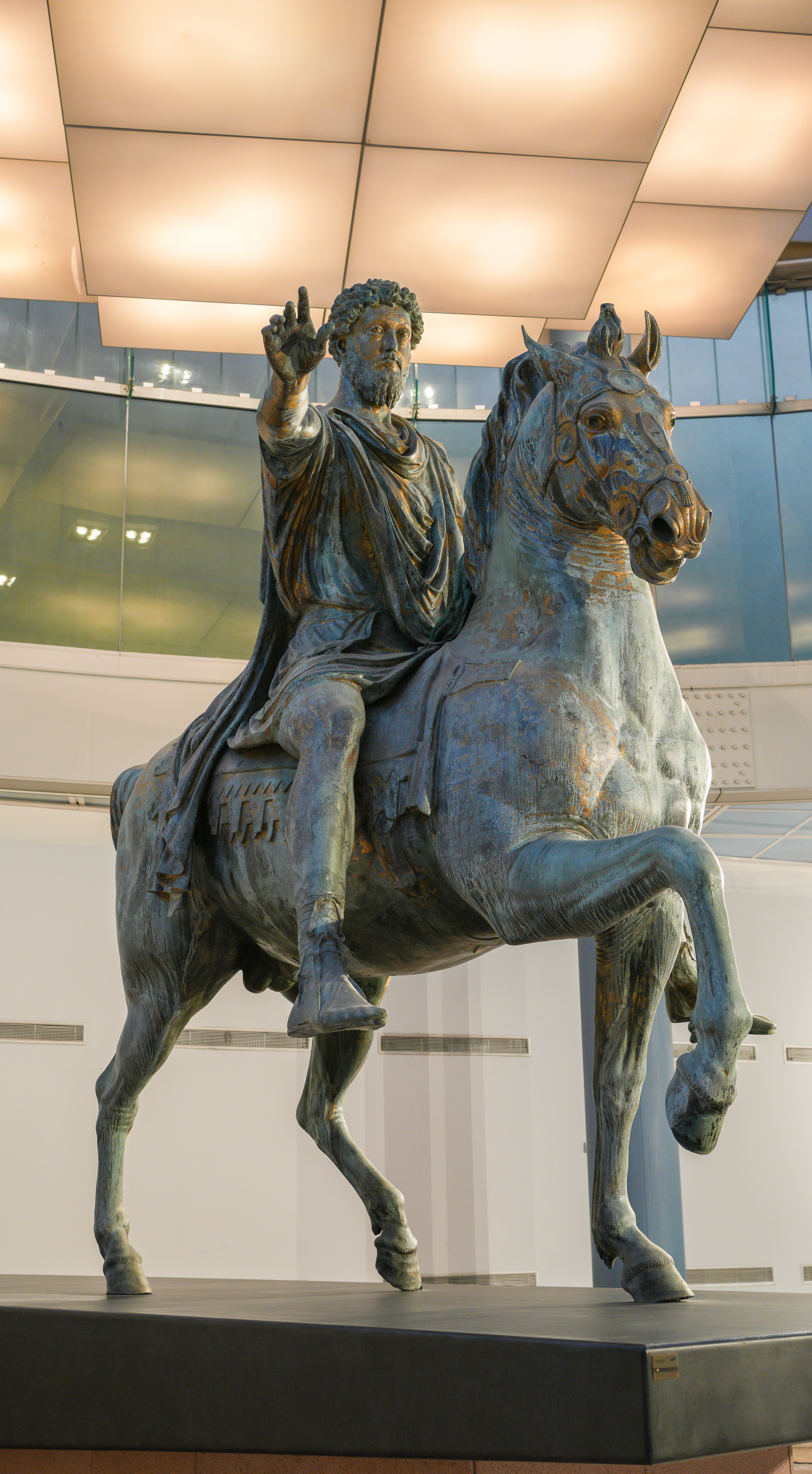
- The original
- Click on the map for a fullscreen view
- Year: 175; 1851 years ago
- Medium: Bronze, originally gilded
- Location: Capitoline Museums; 41°53′34″N 12°28′56″E

The equestrian statue of Marcus Aurelius (Italian: statua equestre di Marco Aurelio; Latin: Equus Marci Aurelii) is an ancient Roman equestrian statue on the Capitoline Hill, Rome, Italy. It is made of bronze and stands 4.24 m (13.9 ft) tall. Although the emperor is mounted, the sculpture otherwise exhibits many similarities to the standing statues of Augustus. The original is on display in the Capitoline Museums, while the sculpture now standing in the open air at the Piazza del Campidoglio is a replica made in 1981 when the original was taken down for restoration.

== Description ==
The statue projects an impression of power and god-like grandeur: the emperor is over life-size and extends his hand in a gesture of adlocutio used by emperors when addressing their troops. Some historians assert that a conquered enemy was originally part of the sculpture (based on medieval accounts, including in the Mirabilia Urbis Romae, which suggest that a small figure of a bound barbarian chieftain cowered underneath the horse's front right leg). Such an image was meant to portray the emperor as victorious and all-conquering. However, shown without weapons or armour, Marcus Aurelius seems to be a bringer of peace rather than a military hero, for this is how he saw himself and his reign.

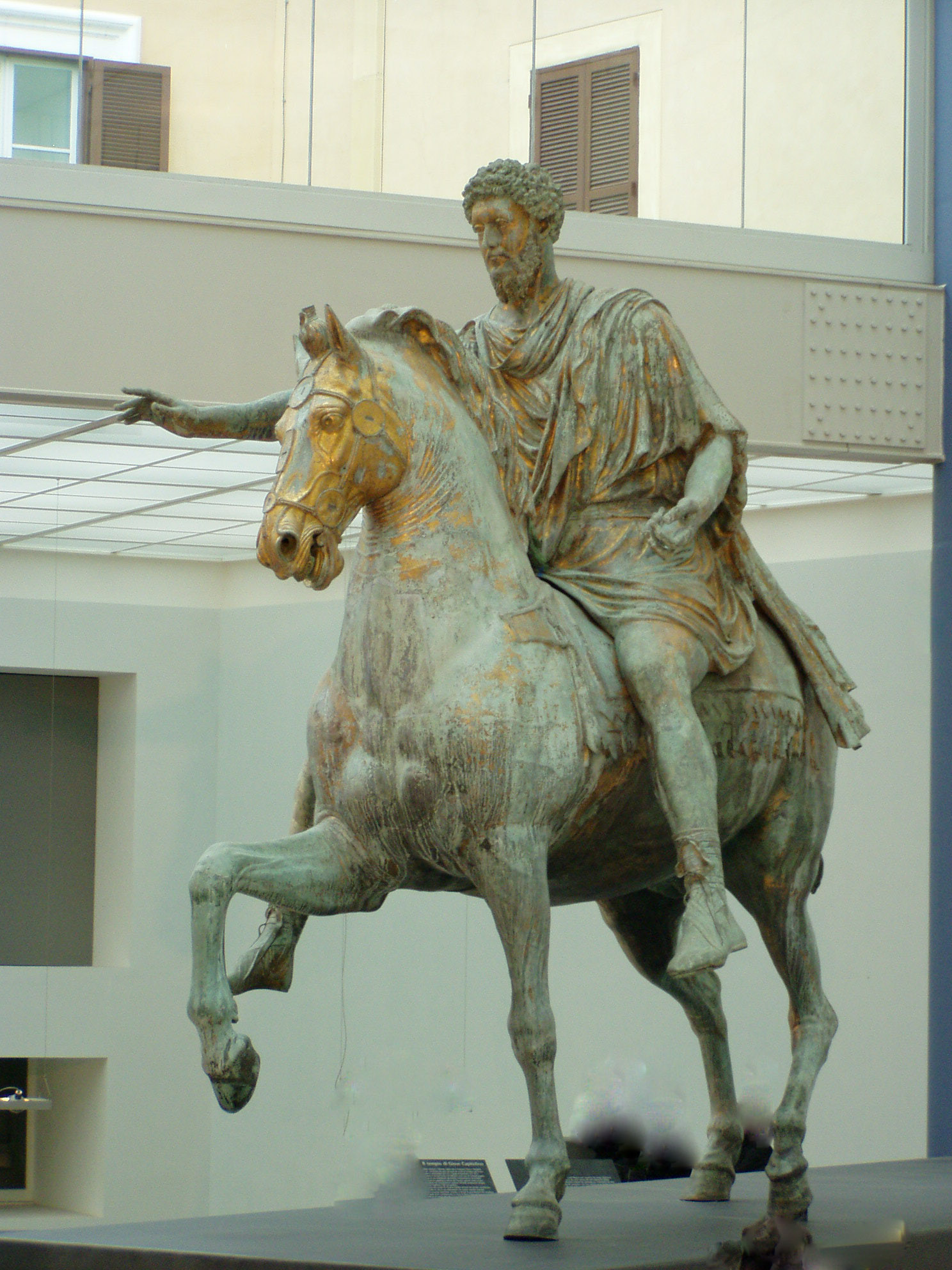

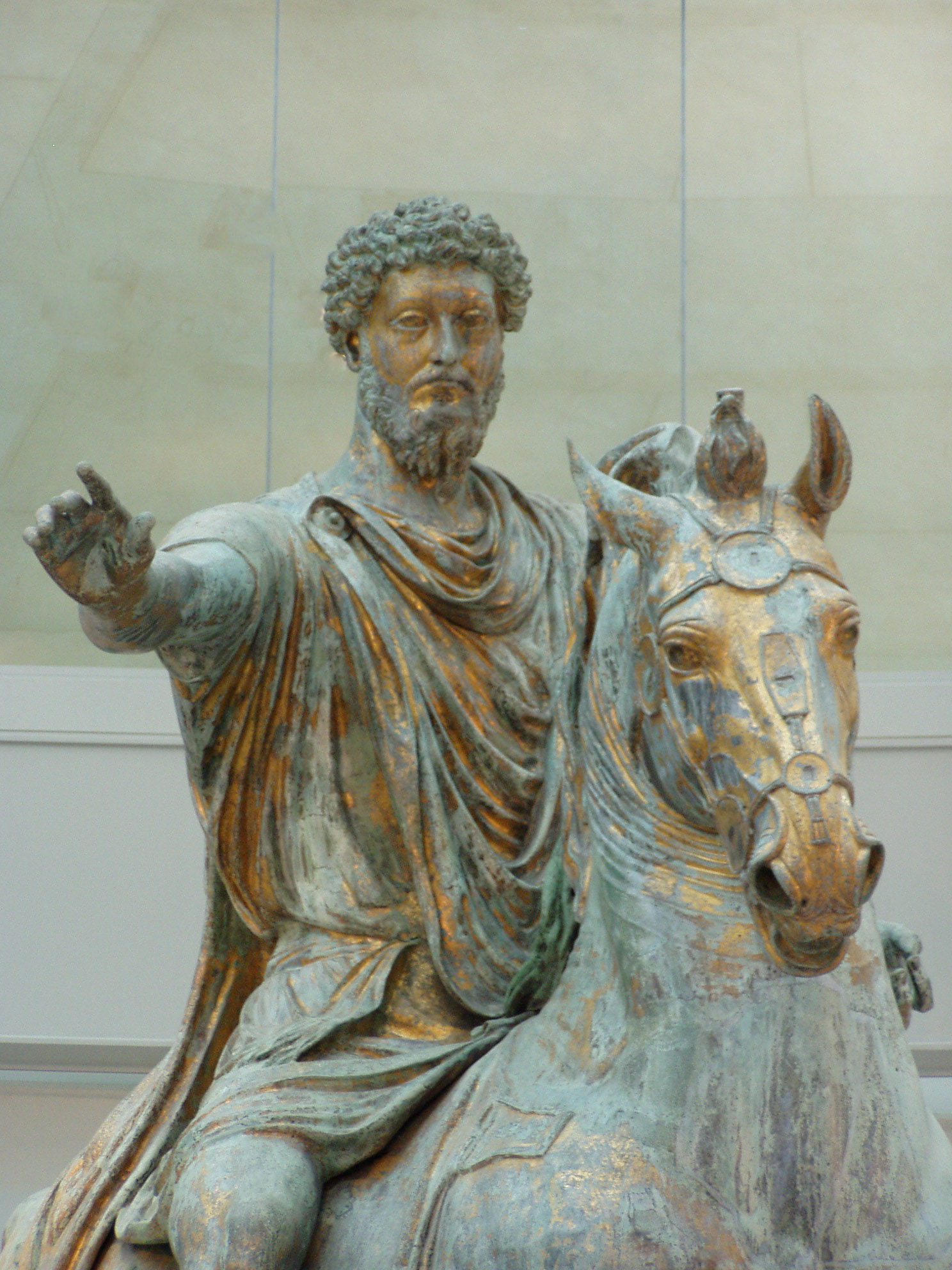

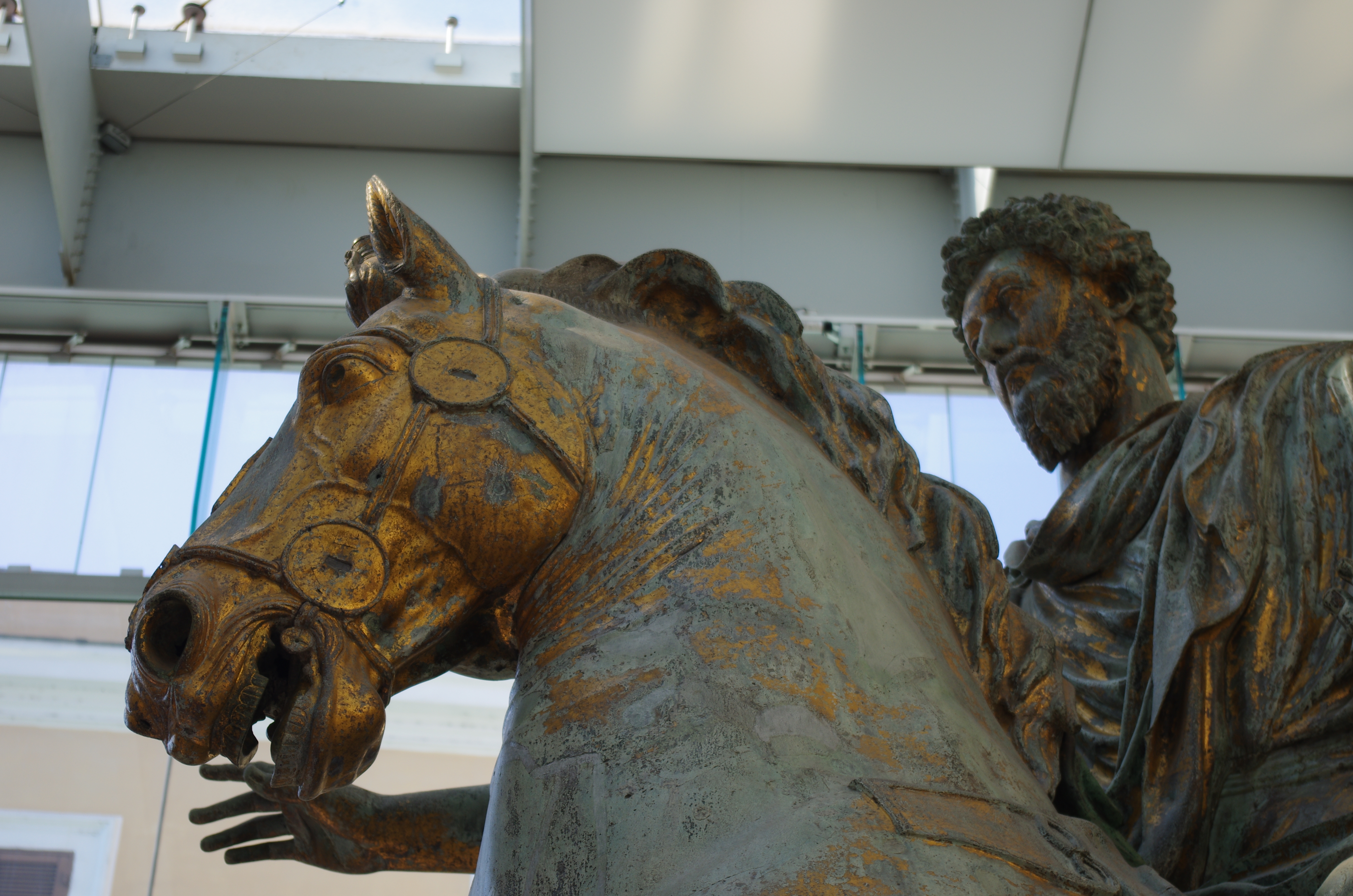

The emperor is shown riding without the use of stirrups, which had not yet been introduced to the West. While the horse has been meticulously studied in order to be recreated for other artists' works, the saddle cloth was copied with the thought that it was part of the standard Roman uniform. The saddle cloth is actually Sarmatian in origin, suggesting that the horse is a Sarmatian horse and that the statue was created to honour the victory over the Sarmatians by Marcus Aurelius, after which he adopted "Sarmaticus" to his name.

== History ==
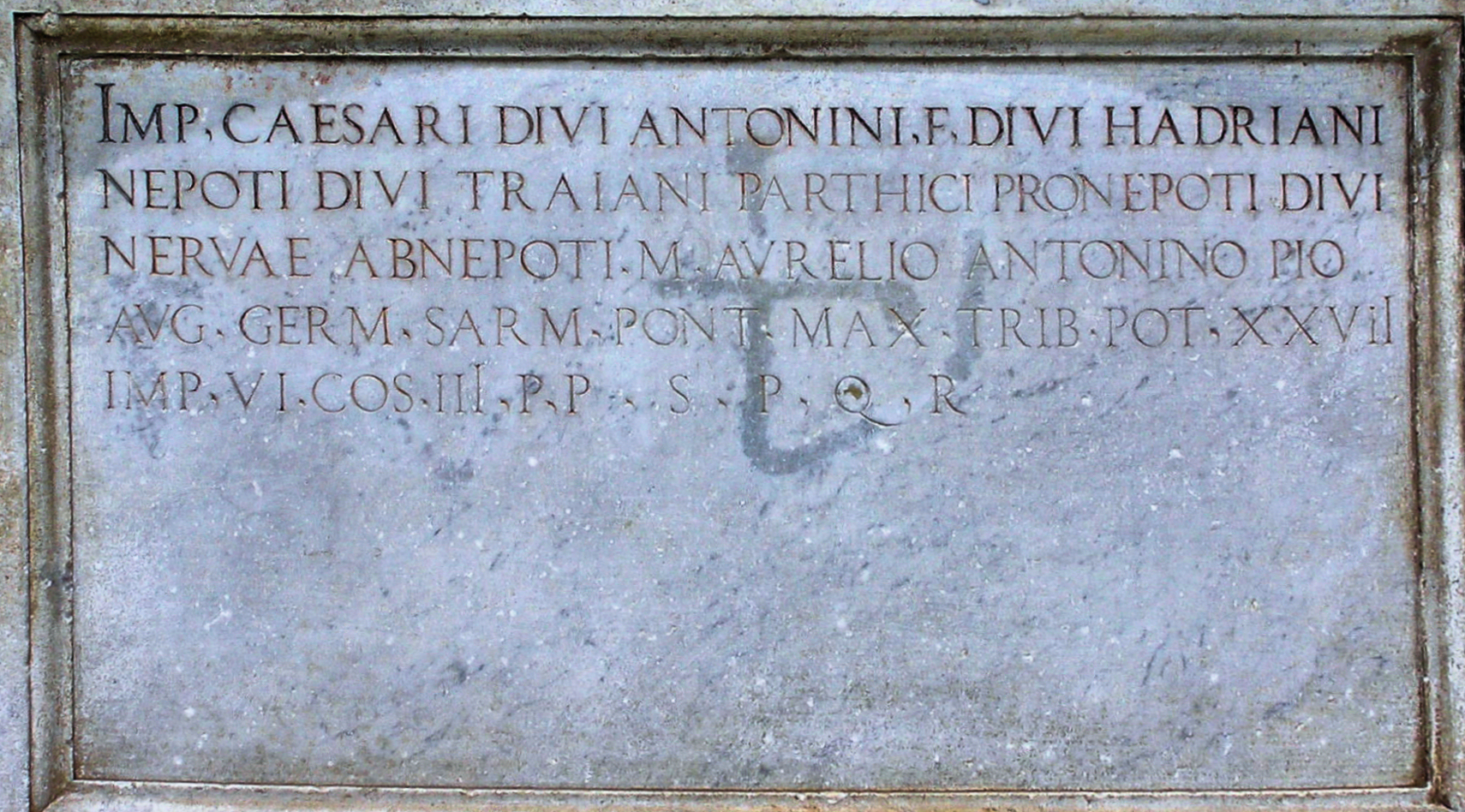
The inscription on the plinth of the statue, commissioned by Pope Paul III

The statue was erected around 175 AD. Its original location is debated: the Roman Forum and Piazza Colonna (where the Column of Marcus Aurelius stands) have been proposed. However, it was noted that the site where it had originally stood had been converted into a vineyard during the early Middle Ages.

Although there were many equestrian imperial statues, they rarely survived because it was the common practice to melt down bronze statues for reuse as material for coins or new sculptures in the late empire. Indeed, that of Marcus Aurelius is one of only two surviving bronze statues of a pre-Christian Roman emperor; the Regisole, destroyed after the French Revolution, may have been another. The equestrian statue of Marcus Aurelius in Rome owes its preservation to the Campidoglio to a common misidentification of Marcus Aurelius, the philosopher-emperor, with Constantine the Great, the Christian emperor; indeed, more than 20 other bronze equestrian statues of various emperors and generals had been melted down since the end of the Imperial Roman era.

It has been speculated that its misidentification stems from the prior existence of an equestrian statue of Constantine which had stood beside the Arch of Septimius Severus, and which had been most likely taken on the orders of the emperor Constans II during his visit to Rome in 663. With its removal, the people eventually mistakenly identified Marcus Aurelius's statue as Constantine's.

In the Middle Ages this was one of the few Roman statues to remain on public view, in the Campus Lateranensis, to the east of the Lateran Palace in Rome, from 1474 on a pedestal provided by Pope Sixtus IV. Its placement next to the Lateran Palace was due to the fact that this site used to contain the house of Marcus Aurelius's grandfather Marcus Annius Verus, which was where the emperor's birth and early education took place. According to the Liber Pontificalis, an unpopular prefect of the city under Pope John XII (d. 964) was hung from it by the hair by the mob.

By order of Pope Paul III, it was moved to the Piazza del Campidoglio (Capitoline Hill) during Michelangelo's redesign of the hill in 1538, to remove it from the main traffic of the square. Though Michelangelo disagreed with the central positioning, he designed a pedestal for it. The original bronze statue is now in the Palazzo dei Conservatori of the Musei Capitolini; that in the square is a modern replica.

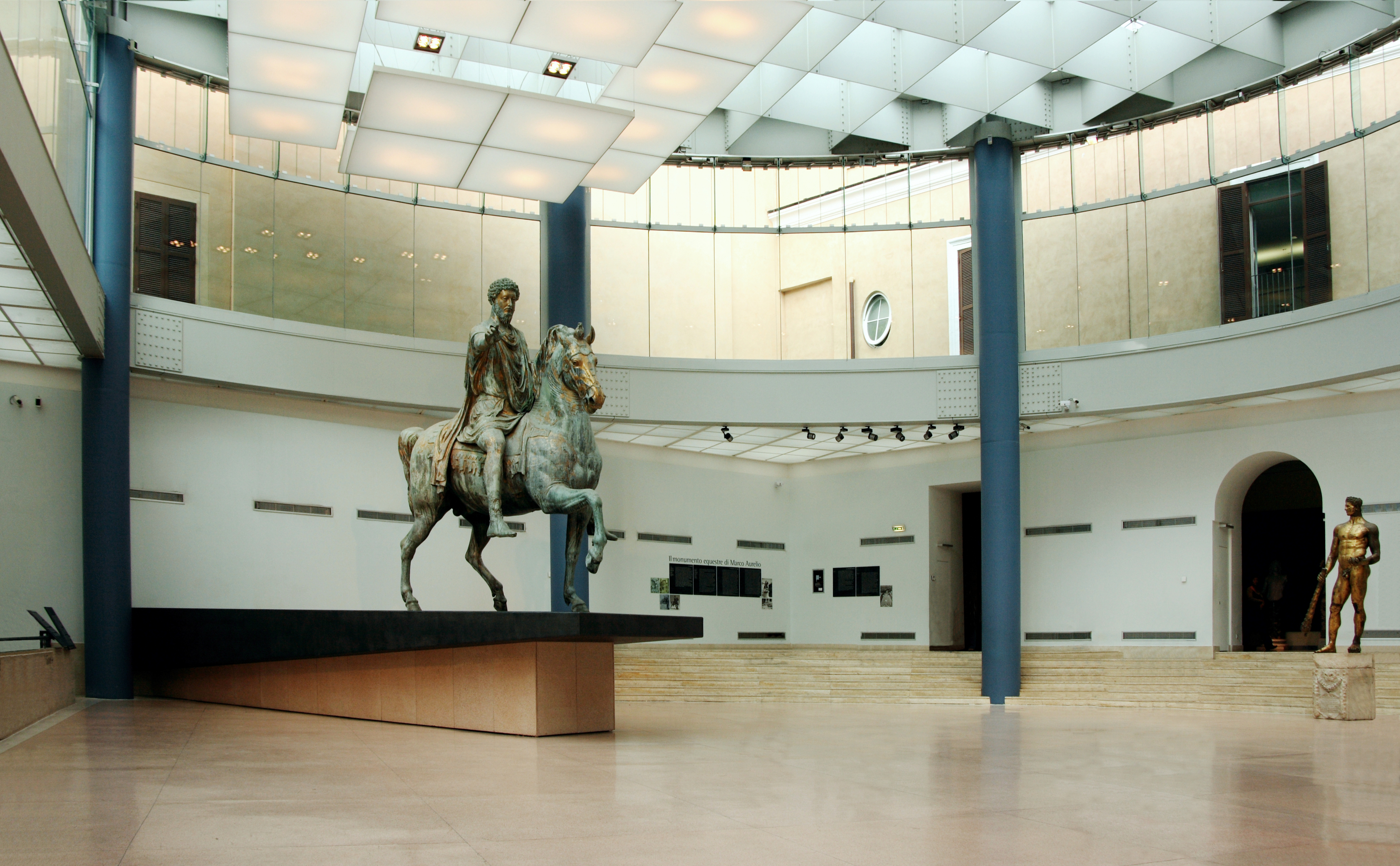
The original statue in the Palazzo dei Conservatori

On the evening of 2 January 1849, following the inception of the revolutionary Roman Republic, a mass procession set up the red–white–green tricolore (now the flag of Italy, then a new and highly "subversive" flag) in the hands of the mounted Marcus Aurelius.

In 1979, a bomb attack in the nearby Palazzo Senatorio damaged the marble base of the statue.

== Cultural significance ==
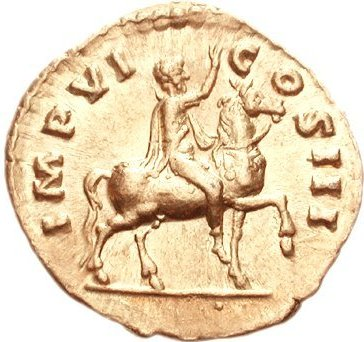
Aureus of Marcus Aurelius (AD December 173 – June 174) and Italian €0.50 coin (2002)

The statue appears on the reverse of an aureus of Marcus Aurelius struck in 174 AD. It is also depicted on the reverse of the modern Italian €0.50 coin, designed by Roberto Mauri.

The statue was formerly completely gilded; visible remnants remain. An old local myth says that it will turn gold again on the Day of Judgment.

=== Replicas ===
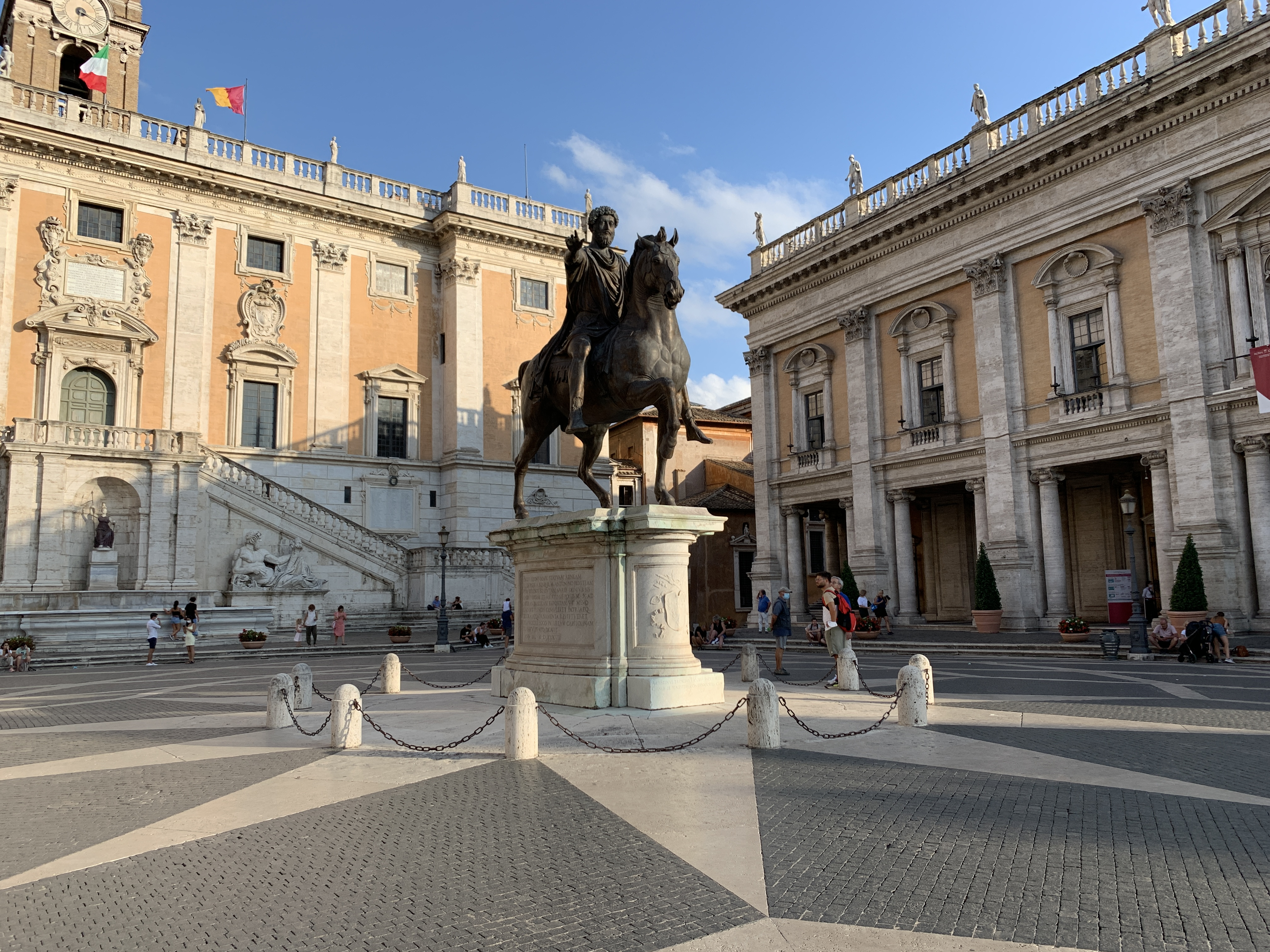
Replica of the equestrian statue of Marcus Aurelius on the Capitoline Hill

In 1981, work began on producing a replica of the statue for outdoor display. Digital image files were used for reference while a laser beam ensured accurate measurements. Conservators used this copy to cast a faithful bronze replica of the statue, now on the Campidoglio.
