= Philip Weilbach =

Danish art historian and encyclopedist

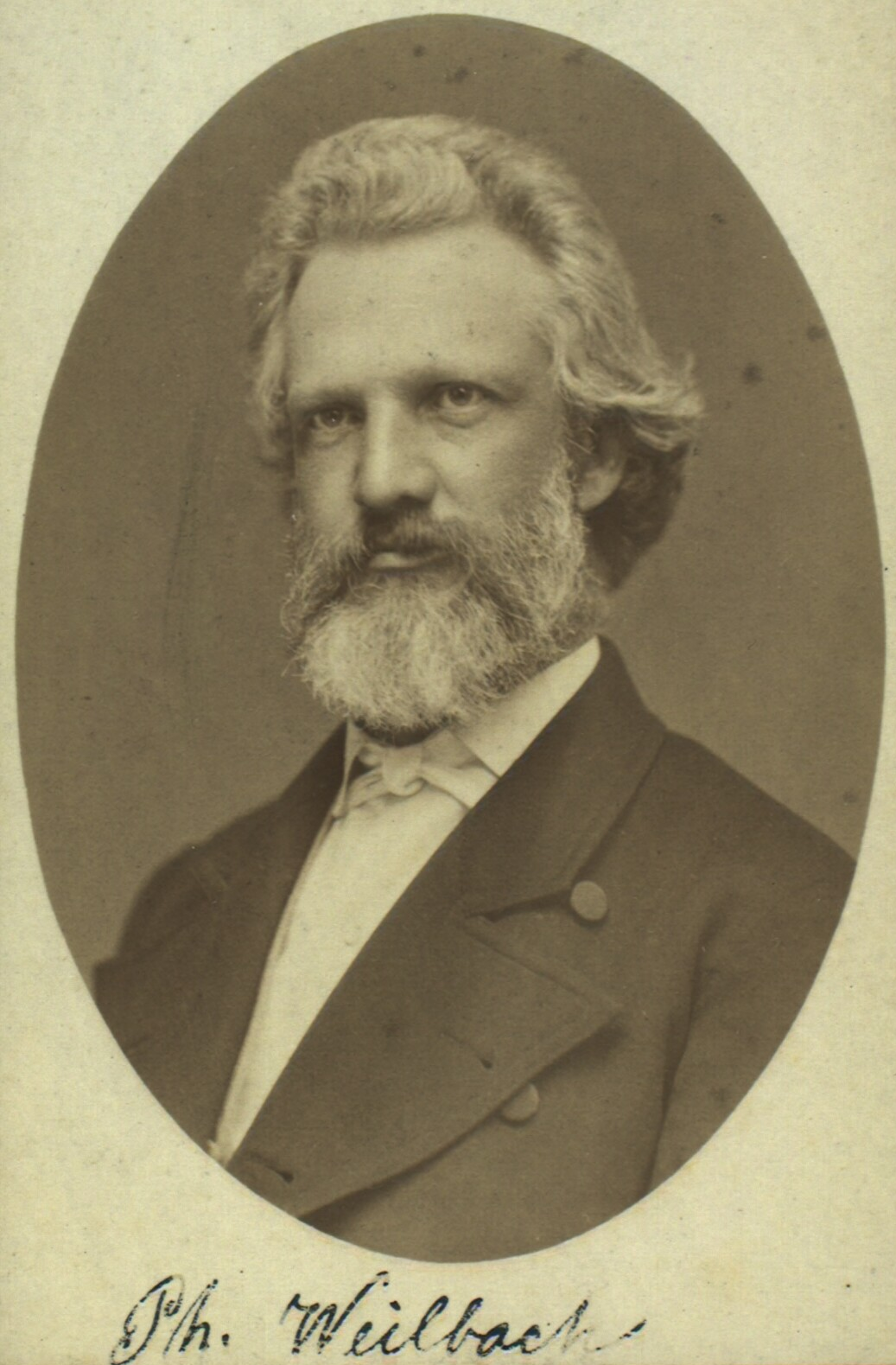
- Born: 5 August 1834; Usserød, Denmark
- Died: 22 November 1900 (aged 66); Copenhagen, Denmark
- Occupation: Art historian

Philip Weilbach (5 August 1834, Usserød – 22 November 1900, Copenhagen) was a Danish art historian and encyclopedist. He is remembered above all for his pioneering work on the early editions of the biographical dictionary, Weilbachs Kunstnerleksikon (Weilbach's Artists' Lexicon).

== Early life ==
Son of Johan Philip Weilbach who ran a clothing factory in Usserød north of Copenhagen, Weilbach graduated from Borgdyd School on the Copenhagen island of Christianshavn in 1852. He then studied esthetics and history of art but did not take final examinations. From 1860 to 1862, he was in Rome as secretary to the Danish consul and became a member of the Scandinavian Association.

== Career ==
On returning to Denmark, he published De berømte Broncedøre for Hovedindgangen til Baptisteriet i Florens, udførte af Lorenzo Ghiberti (1862) about Lorenzo Ghiberti's bronze doors in the Baptistry of Florence Cathedral. He assisted the literary critic Clemens Petersen and also befriended the Norwegian author Bjørnstjerne Bjørnson for a while, leading in 1870 to a collection of articles he published as Konst og Æsthetik (Art and Esthetics). In 1872, he wrote a biography of the painter Christoffer Wilhelm Eckersberg titled Maleren Eckersbergs Levned og Værker.

In 1883, he followed Julius Lange as secretary of the Royal Danish Academy and also became the institution's librarian, a position he maintained for the rest of his life. H.

While his work as a critic was less notable than that of Lange, his contributions to the history of architecture were more successful. These included Hvem har bygget Frederiks Hospital? (Who Built Frederik's Hospital?) in 1899 and En bygning af Harsdorff i Trondhjem (A Building by Harsdorff in Trondheim) in 1901. However, he is remembered above all for his work on the first and second series of Denmark's biographical dictionary of artists and architects known as Weilbachs Kunstnerleksikon, first published in 1877–1878 and again in 1896–1897. These solid works are based on rich background material as well as on archival sources and include personal contributions from artists who were still living at the time. In 1892 Weilbach became a Knight of the Order of the Dannebrog.

== Personal life ==
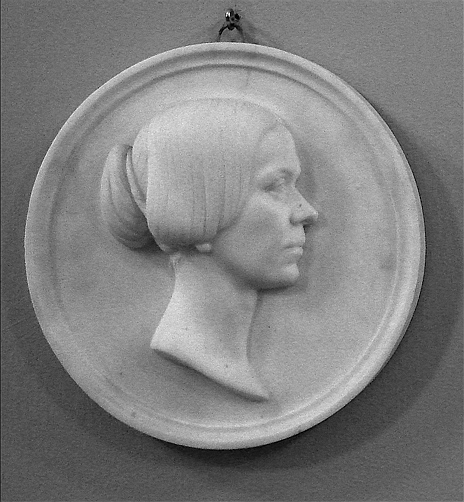
Cæcilie Adolfine Weilbach

Weilbach married Cecilie Adolfine Ammitzbøll (1826–1883), daughter of Hans Henrik Ammitzbøll (1786–1831) and Marie Sophie Ammitzbøll (1793–1853), in Rome on 11 December 1860. They had five children: Philip Bjørnstjerne Weilbach (born 1861), Frederik Immanuel Weilbach (born 1863), Carl Valdemar Weilbach (born 1865), Dagmar Charlotte Weilbach (born 1866), and Niels Olaf Weilbach (1868–1876).

On 19 March 1886, Weilbach married Emma Emilie Frederikke Dreyer (1851–1900), daughter of merchant and consul in Helsingør Carl Frederik August Dreyer (1820–1904) and Juliane Louise Wilhelmine Becker (1825–1900). The marriage was later dissolved.
