= Weilbachs Kunstnerleksikon =

Danish biographical dictionary of artists and architects

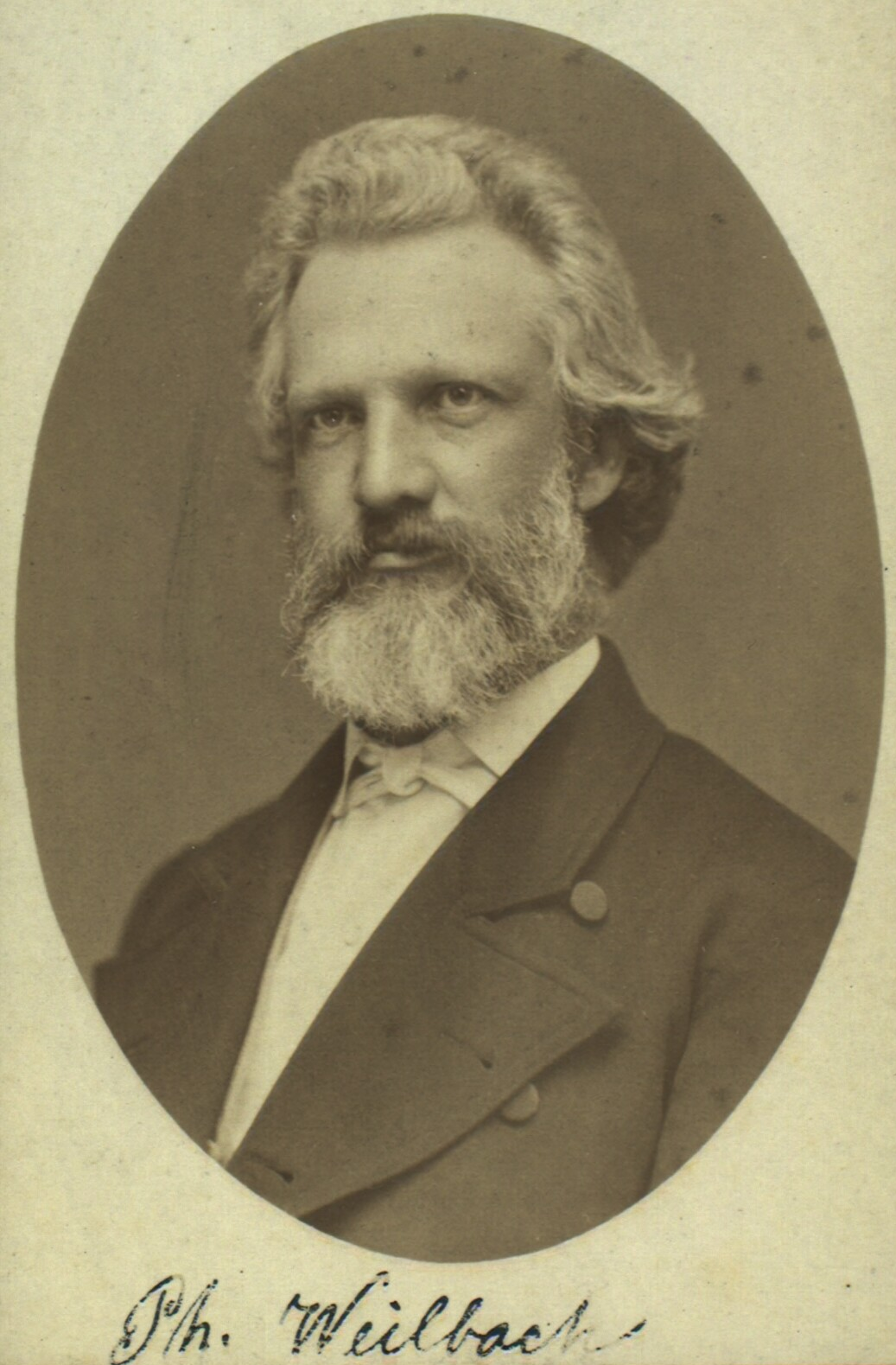
Danish art historian Philip Weilbach (1834-1900), founder of Weilbachs Kunstnerleksikon

Weilbachs Kunstnerleksikon (English: Weilbach's Biographical Dictionary of Artists) is a Danish biographical dictionary of artists and architects. The current edition, which is also freely accessible online, contains the biographies of some 8,000 Danish artists and architects.

== History ==
The first edition, Dansk Konstnerlexikon (1878), was the work of Philip Weilbach which he expanded into the two-volume Nyt dansk Kunstnerlexikon in 1897. In subsequent editions, it became the standard reference work on all notable Danish artists and architects. The third edition, under the auspices of a committee, was published in three volumes (1947–1952) and was said to provide biographical details and information on Danish artists including painters, architects, sculptors, conservators, stonemasons, engineers, lithographers, engravers, stucco artists and miniaturists.

== Current edition ==
The fourth edition of Weilbach, edited by Sys Hartmann, was published in nine volumes in 1994–2000 with the biographies of almost 8,000 artists and architects.

Since 1996, an online, freely accessible digitized version of the fourth edition has been available as the major component of Kunstindeks Danmark.
