= François Dieussart =

- Born: c. 1600
- Died: 1661
- Known for: Sculpture
- Style: Italian Baroque sculpture
- Patrons: Thomas Howard, 21st Earl of Arundel, Christian IV of Denmark, Frederick III of Denmark, Frederick William, Elector of Brandenburg, Archduke Leopold Wilhelm of Austria

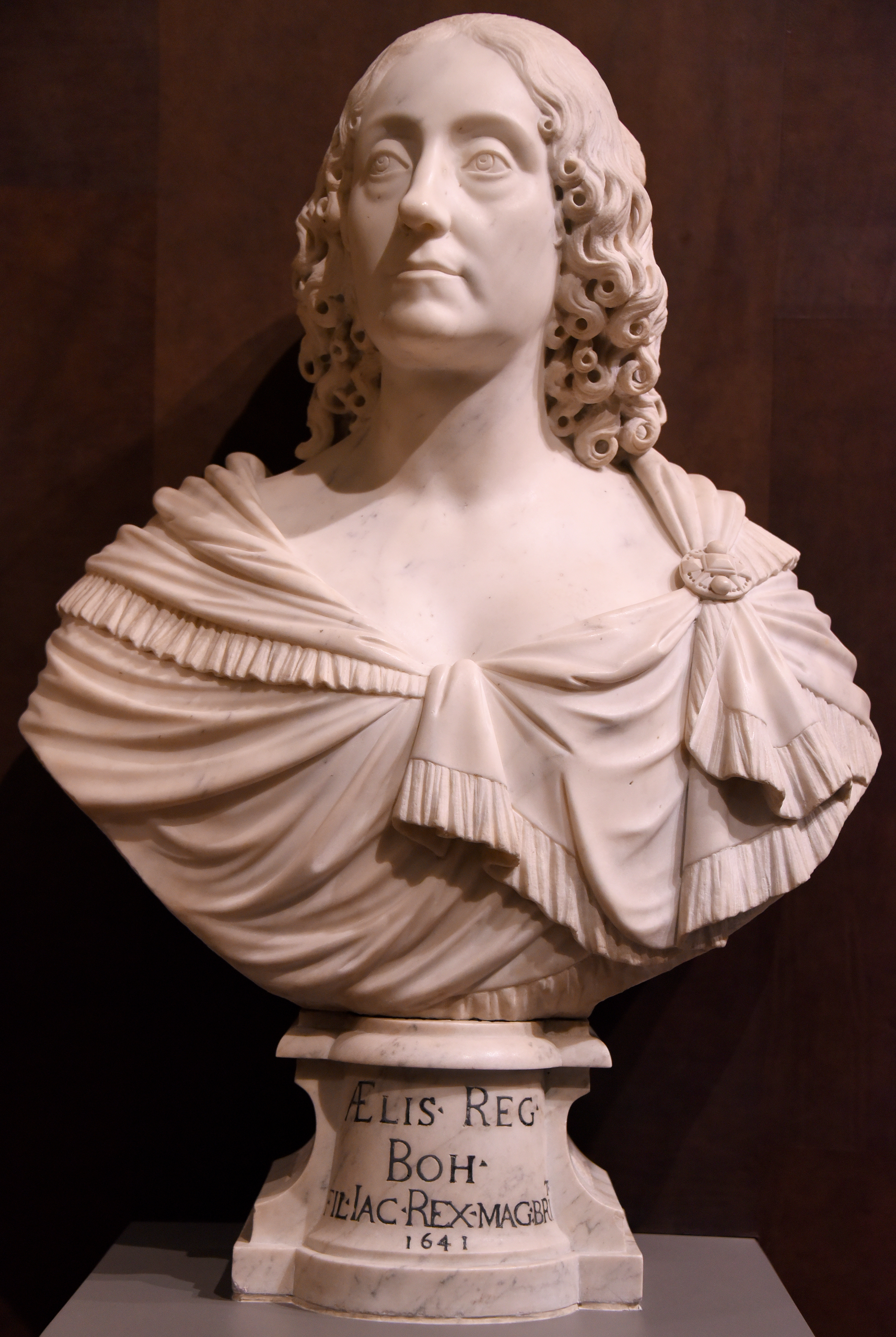
Bust of Elizabeth, Queen of Bohemia. Marble, circa 1641 CE. By Francois Dieussart. From the Dutch Republic, Now the Netherlands. The Victoria and Albert Museum, London

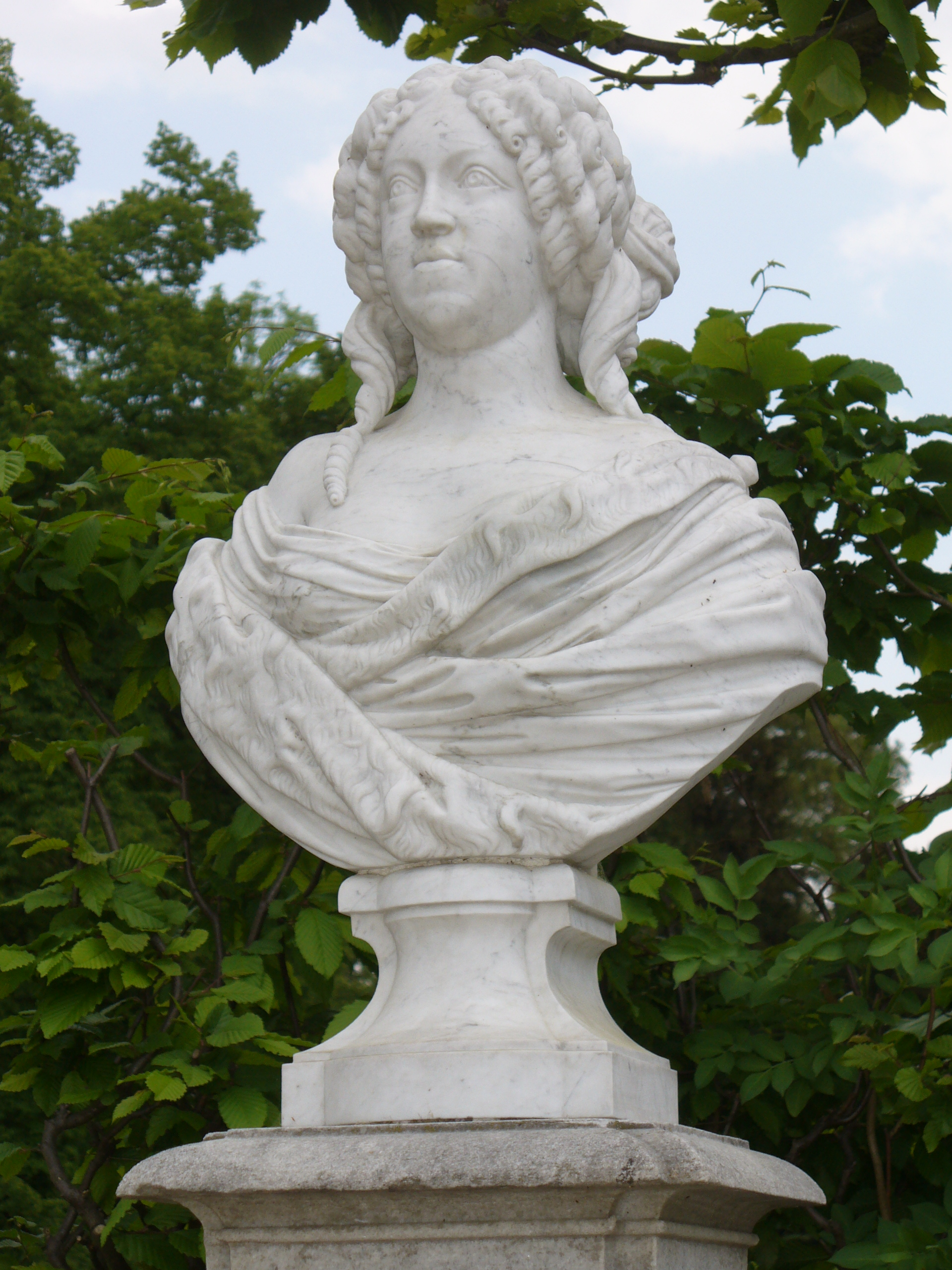
Bust of Mary, Princess Royal and Princess of Orange in Sanssouci.

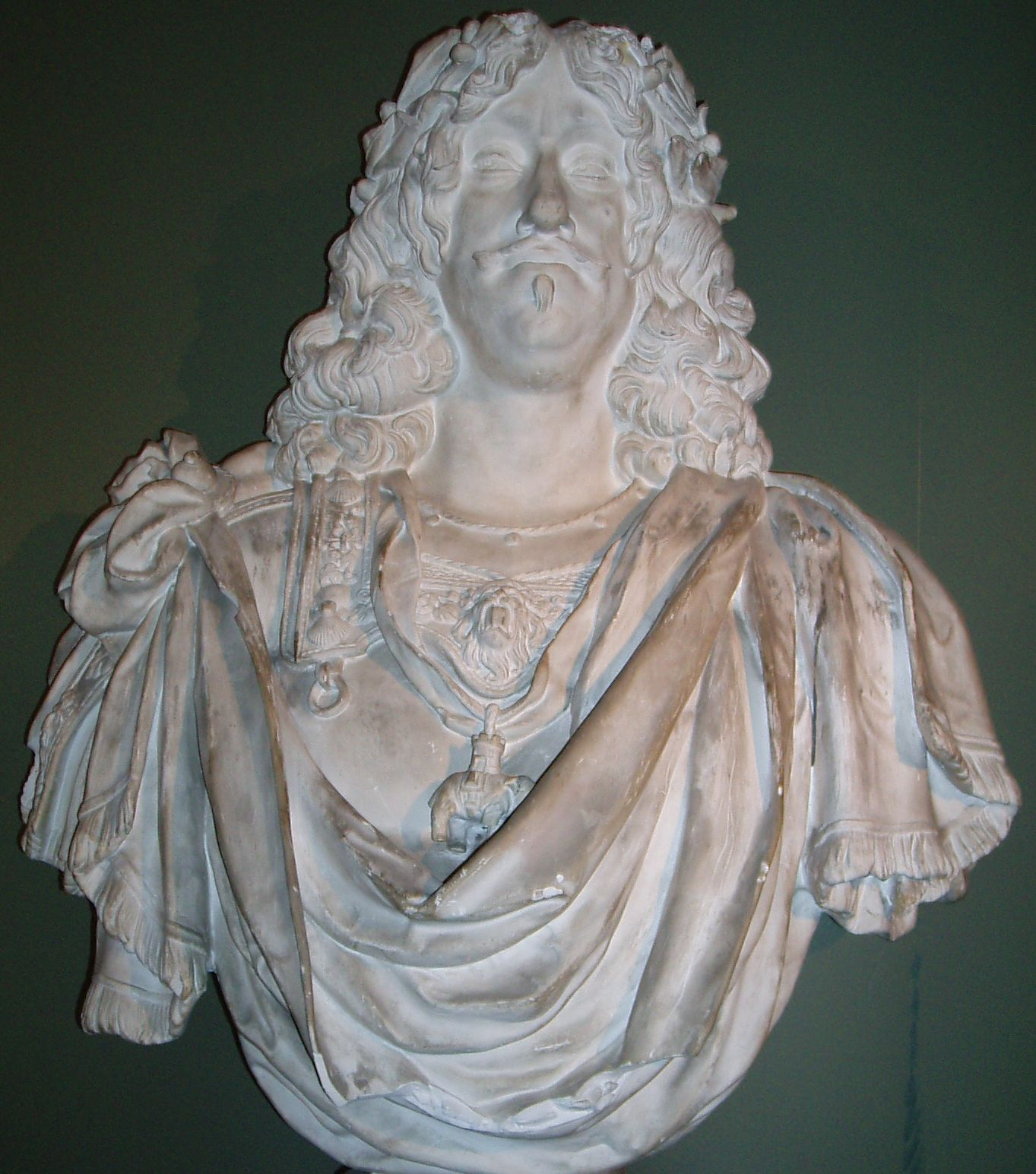
Dieussart's bust of Frederick III of Denmark.

François Dieussart (also Frans; Armentières, c. 1600 – London, 1661) was a Walloon sculptor who worked for court patrons in England, the Dutch Republic and northern Europe, producing portrait busts in the Italianate manner.

== Life and work ==
Dieussart was likely an active sculptor by the time he arrived in Rome in his early twenties. He appears in an entry from 1622 at the charitable organisation run at the Church of St. Julian of the Flemings and had become its director by 1630. He was invited to England by the Earl of Arundel in 1636, and made a reputation there with the construction of a magnificent mechanical monstrance forty feet (12.2 metres) high for Queen Henrietta Maria's chapel at Somerset House.

His bust of Charles I of England, probably commissioned by Arundel, is at Arundel Castle, Another portrait bust of Charles I in Windsor Castle, possibly by Thomas Adye or Francis Bird (c. 1737–44) is speculatively thought to be based on a now lost bust by Dieussart.

He is mentioned in a poem by Cornelis de Bie in his book Het Gulden Cabinet as being court sculptor for the Stuarts in England. A brief biographical sketch for Dieussart was published in the early art dictionary Teutsche Academie by Joachim von Sandrart. According to the RKD he learned his trade in Rome from François Duquesnoy.

== Literature ==
- Frits Scholten, François Dieussart, Constantijn Huygens, and the Classical Ideal in Funerary Sculpture, Simiolus: Netherlands Quarterly for the History of Art, Vol. 25, No. 4. (1997), pp. 303–328.
- Ulrich Thieme, ed. (1914), "Dusart (Dieussart), François", Allgemeines Lexikon der bildenden Künstler von der Antike bis zur Gegenwart (in German), vol. 10, Leipzig: E. A. Seemann, p. 225
