= Deaths in August 2000 =

The following is a list of notable deaths in August 2000.

Entries for each day are listed alphabetically by surname. A typical entry lists information in the following sequence:

- Name, age, country of citizenship at birth, subsequent country of citizenship (if applicable), reason for notability, cause of death (if known), and reference.

== August 2000 ==
=== 1 ===
- Angèle Albrecht, 57, German ballerina.
- Maxie Berger, 83, Canadian boxer.
- Martin Bílek, 27, Czech shot putter, suicide.
- Robert A. Brooks, 68, American entrepreneur, complications after surgery.
- Joanna Constantinidis, 72, English potter and ceramic artist.
- Hugh Hood, 72, Canadian novelist, essayist and university professor.
- Ali Sardar Jafri, 86, Indian urdu writer.
- Aldis Kļaviņš, 25, Latvian Olympic canoeist (1996), traffic collision.
- Louis-Henry Lemirre, 71, French Olympic archer (1972).
- Nanjil K. Manoharan, 71, Indian politician, cardiac arrest.
- Steve McCrory, 36, American boxer and Olympian (1984).
- Arnulf Pilhatsch, 75, Austrian Olympic high jumper (1948).
- Benedetto Pola, 85, Italian Olympic cyclist (1936).
- Joseph Robert Sealy, 93, English botanist.
- Galina Sergeyeva, 86, Soviet and Russian actress.

=== 2 ===
- John Caldwell, 65, Australian farmer and politician.
- William Rossa Cole, 80, American anthologist, columnist, and writer.
- Shlomo Halberstam, 92, American rabbi.
- Trevor Leggett, 85, British author and translator, stroke.
- Howie McCarty, 81, American basketball player.
- Jan Mertens, 84, Dutch politician.
- Patricia Moyes, 77, British mystery writer.
- Simon Stefani, 71, Albanian communist politician.

=== 3 ===
- Isolina Ferré, 85, Puerto Rican Roman Catholic religious sister.
- Joann Lõssov, 78, Soviet Estonian basketball player and Olympian (1952).
- Michael Meyer, 79, English translator and writer.
- Geoffrey Page, 80, British flying ace during World War II.
- Mirian Tsalkalamanidze, 73, Georgian flyweight freestyle wrestler and Olympic champion (1956).

=== 4 ===
- Thomas F. Allgood, 71, American politician, plane crash.
- David Blee, 83, American CIA employee.
- Jimmy Bowie, 75, Scottish football player.
- Pete Corey, 70, American racing driver.
- John Joseph Graham, 86, American Roman Catholic prelate.
- Fred W. Hooper, 102, American racehorse owner and breeder.
- Julio Rodolfo Moctezuma, 73, Mexican lawyer.
- Michael Szwarc, 91, British and American polymer chemist.
- Halyna Zubchenko, 71, Ukrainian painter, muralist, and social activist.

=== 5 ===
- Lala Amarnath, 88, Indian cricketer.
- Otto Buchsbaum, 80, Austrian politician.
- Afrânio Coutinho, 89, Brazilian literary critic and essayist.
- Tullio Crali, 89, Italian artist associated with Futurism.
- Renée Devillers, 97, French stage and film actress.
- Sir Alec Guinness, 86, English actor (The Bridge on the River Kwai, Star Wars, Lawrence of Arabia), Oscar winner (1958), liver cancer.
- Murray Krieger, 76, American literary critic and theorist.
- Arturo Durazo Moreno, 76, Mexican Chief of police and drug trafficker.
- Dudley Randall, 86, American poet and poetry publisher.
- Edgardo Sogno, 84, Italian diplomat, partisan and political figure.
- Otto Wiener, 89, Austrian baritone.
- Pascal Zilliox, 38, French Olympic long-distance runner (1992).

=== 6 ===
- Raymond J. Broderick, 86, American jurist and politician, cancer.
- Lillian Chestney, 86, American painter.
- Sir Robin Day, 76, British political broadcaster, heart complications.
- Marv Felderman, 84, American baseball player (Chicago Cubs).
- George Merry, 71, Canadian Olympic alpine skier (1952).
- Ernesto Montemayor Jr., 72, Mexican Olympic sports shooter (1960, 1972).
- Max Phipps, 60, Australian actor, cancer.
- Raúl Sanguineti, 67, Argentine chess Grandmaster.
- Arthur Harold Stone, 83, British mathematician.
- Joan Trimble, 85, Irish composer and pianist.

=== 7 ===
- Samuel Akpabot, 67, Nigerian music composer, ethnomusicologist and author.
- Georges Matheron, 69, French mathematician and geologist.
- Mona-Lisa Pursiainen, 49, Finnish sprinter and Olympian (1972, 1976), breast cancer.
- Mary Anne MacLeod Trump, 88, American philanthropist and mother of Donald Trump.

=== 8 ===
- Ruth Abrahams, 69, British artist.
- Jaime Annexy, 72, Puerto Rican Olympic hammer thrower (1952).
- Jess Barker, 88, American actor, liver cirrhosis.
- Sholom Noach Berezovsky, 88, Israeli Hasidic rebbe.
- Luigi Bonos, 90, Italian comedian and actor.
- Katherine Butler, 86, Irish nun.
- Mauro Calligaris, 48, Italian Olympic swimmer and swimming coach (1972), traffic collision.
- Alvin Cassel, 86, American lawyer.
- Ralph Chapin, 85, American businessman and Zen pracitioner.
- Walter Chappell, 75, American photographer and poet, lung cancer.
- Abdel Galil Hamza, 76, Egyptian Olympic footballer (1952).
- Ernie Hefferle, 85, American football player and coach.
- Živorad Jevtić, 56, Serbian football player and Olympian (1964).
- Murdo MacKay, 84, Canadian ice hockey player (Montreal Canadiens).
- Jaap Marais, 77, Afrikaner nationalist thinker, author and politician.
- Mario Migliardi, 81, Italian television and film score composer.
- S. Nijalingappa, 97, Indian politician.
- Anatoliy Romashin, 69, Soviet and Russian actor and director, crushed by a falling tree.
- Sir Banja Tejan-Sie, 83, Sierra Leonean politician and Governor General.
- Harry D. Thiers, 81, American mycologist.
- John F. Warren, 91, American cinematographer.

=== 9 ===
- Marcel Bouyer, 80, French politician.
- Eliot Chapple, 91, American anthropologist.
- Josias Cunningham, 66, Northern Irish politician, car crash.
- John Harsanyi, 80, Hungarian-American economist, Nobel Prize laureate, heart attack.
- Arie van Leeuwen, 90, Dutch Olympic hurdler (1928).
- Nicholas Markowitz, 15, American kidnapping victim, shot.
- Louis Nucera, 72, French writer, traffic accident.
- Fouad Serageddin, 88, Egyptian politician, Minister of Finance.
- Vitaliy Starukhin, 51, Ukrainian football player, pneumonia.
- Herb Thomas, 77, American NASCAR driver and member of the NASCAR Hall of Fame, heart attack.
- Lewis Wilson, 80, American actor (Batman).

=== 10 ===
- Johan Camitz, 38, Swedish director of music videos and advertisements, struck by a vehicle.
- Robert Manuel Cook, 91, British classical scholar.
- Suzanne Danco, 89, Belgian soprano.
- Joan Marsh, 87, American child actress in silent films.
- Tibor Mezőfi, 74, Hungarian basketball player and Olympian (1948, 1952).
- Gilbert Parkhouse, 74, Welsh cricket player.
- Charles Ribordy, 70, Swiss Olympic fencer (1960).
- Rita Trapanese, 49, Italian figure skater and Olympian (1968, 1972), traffic collision.

=== 11 ===
- Pat Gerrard Cooke, 65, English painter.
- Les Dye, 84, American gridiron football player (Washington Redskins).
- Paidi Jairaj, 90, Indian film actor, director and producer.
- Talal Maddah, 60, Saudi musician and composer, heart attack.
- Usha Mehta, 80, India Gandhian and freedom fighter.
- Jean Papineau-Couture, 83, Canadian composer.
- Ric Roman, 83, American actor.
- Constantin Zureiq, Syrian Arab intellectual.

=== 12 ===
- Noboru Akiyama, 66, Japanese baseball player.
- Eliyahu Ben-Elissar, 68, Israeli politician and diplomat, cardiac arrest.
- Alberto Pedro Cabrera, 54, Argentine basketball player, leukemia.
- Jean Carzou, 93, French-Armenian artist, painter, and illustrator.
- Maupin Cummings, 90, American lawyer, judge, and politician.
- Dave Edwards, 59, American big band-style musician, cardiac arrest.
- Loretta Young, 87, American actress (The Farmer's Daughter, Come to the Stable, The Loretta Young Show), Oscar winner (1948), ovarian cancer.

=== 13 ===
- Edgar Claxton, 90, English rail engineer.
- John Cullinane, 79, Australian bishop.
- Antony Duff, 80, British diplomat, Director-General of MI5 (1985-1988).
- Terence Feely, 72, British screenwriter, playwright and author.
- Nazia Hassan, 35, Pakistani pop singer-songwriter, lawyer and social activist, lung cancer.
- Lefty Turner, 88, American baseball player.
- Bob Wente, 67, American racing driver.

=== 14 ===
- Walter Benton, 69, American jazz tenor saxophonist.
- John Boland, 55, Irish politician, cancer.
- K. Danner Clouser, 70, American bioethicist, pancreatic cancer.
- David Cushman, 60, American biochemist.
- Alain Fournier, 56, French computer graphics researcher, lymphoma.
- Ken Heintzelman, 84, American baseball player (Pittsburgh Pirates, Philadelphia Phillies).
- Cuan McCarthy, 71, South African cricket player.
- John Milford, 70, American actor, skin cancer.
- Alfred Rieck, 86, German rower and Olympic medalist (1936).
- Bernice Giduz Schubert, 86, American botanist & scholar.
- Hawa Singh, 62, Indian heavyweight boxer.
- Rostislav Vovkushevsky, 83, Soviet and Russian painter.
- Mary K. Wells, 79, American television writer and actress.

=== 15 ===
- Zurab Achba, 50, Abkhazian politician, shot.
- T. A. Sarasvati Amma, 81, Indian mathematician.
- Ulla Barding-Poulsen, 88, Danish Olympic fencer (1936, 1952).
- Ena Begović, 40, Croatian actress, traffic accident.
- Helmut Coing, 88, German legal historian.
- James Flynn, 93, American Olympic fencer (1948).
- Eduardo Luján Manera, 55, Argentine football player and manager.
- Victor Pace, 93, Maltese Olympic water polo player (1928).
- Robert Swink, 82, American film editor (Roman Holiday, Funny Girl, The Boys from Brazil), heart attack.
- Edward Craven Walker, 82, British inventor who invented the lava lamp, cancer.
- Lancelot Ware, 85, British founder of Mensa.

=== 16 ===
- Harmen Blok, 89, Dutch mechanical engineer.
- Alan Caddy, 60, English guitarist (The Tornados).
- Barney Djordjevic, 58, American soccer player.
- Grace Halsell, 77, American journalist and writer, multiple myeloma.
- Chanoch Dov Padwa, 91, British rabbi.
- S. C. C. Anthony Pillai, 86, Indian trade unionist and politician, cardiac arrest.
- Renu Saluja, 48, Indian film editor, stomach cancer.
- Thomas Ypsilantis, 72, Greek-American physicist, heart attack.

=== 17 ===
- Puangroi Apaiwong, 85, Thai composer.
- Jane Ardmore, 88, American writer, complications following hip surgery.
- Erich Borchmeyer, 95, German athlete and Olympian medalist (1932, 1936), suicide.
- Lawrence H. Cooke, 85, American lawyer and politician.
- Franco Donatoni, 73, Italian composer, stroke.
- Robert R. Gilruth, 86, American aerospace engineer.
- Stephan Körner, 86, Czech-born British philosopher, suicide.
- Evert Nyberg, 75, Swedish long-distance runner and Olympian (1948, 1956, 1960).
- Emil Petaja, 85, American science fiction and fantasy writer, heart failure.
- Leslie Rees, 94, Australian children's author and writer.
- Hans-Dietrich von Tiesenhausen, 87, Baltic German Kapitänleutnant during World War II.
- Jack Walker, 71, British industrialist and businessman, lung cancer.

=== 18 ===
- Levente Balatoni, 90, Hungarian Olympic alpine skier (1936).
- César Calvo, 60, Peruvian poet, journalist and author.
- Lakshyadhar Choudhury, 85, Indian actor, playwright, film-director and politician.
- Joseph Comerford, 41, British engineer, neck bones trauma.
- Scott Cutlip, 85, American writer and public relations theorist, cancer.
- Maurice Evans, 63, English football player and manager, heart attack.
- Bernard Krainis, 75, American musician.
- Ola Rotimi, 62, Nigerian playwright and theatre director.
- Morton Shulman, 75, Canadian politician, businessman and physician, Parkinson's disease.

=== 19 ===
- Bineswar Brahma, 52, Indian politician, murdered.
- Bertram Carris, 82, English cricketer.
- D. G. Champernowne, 88, English economist and mathematician.
- David Norton Edelstein, 90, American judge.
- Luce Fabbri, 92, Italian anarchist writer, publisher and daughter of Luigi Fabbri.
- Harry Oppenheimer, 91, South African businessman, industrialist and philanthropist, cancer.
- Antonio Pugliese, 59, Italian-Canadian professional wrestler known as Tony Parisi, aneurysm.
- Lee Sholem, 87, American television and film director.

=== 20 ===
- Peter Compston, 84, English officer.
- Alan Crundwell, 77, British bryologist.
- Nancy Evans, 85, British mezzo-soprano opera singer.
- Giovanni Gaddoni, 85, Italian football player.
- Mitch Halpern, 33, American boxing referee, suicide by gunshot.
- Karl Martitsch, 82, Austrian Olympic skier (1948).
- Bill Simon, 80, American songwriter, musician and music critic.
- Henri Theil, 75, Dutch econometrician.

=== 21 ===
- Sir Campbell Adamson, 78, British industrialist.
- Nanasaheb Bonde, 86, Indian politician.
- Chuck Britz, 72, American recording engineer, brain cancer.
- Jackie Coulter, 46, Northern Irish loyalist, shot.
- Lena Cymbrowitz, 43, American politician, cancer.
- Tom Day, 65, American football player (St. Louis Cardinals, Buffalo Bills, San Diego Chargers).
- Peter Hanlin, 68, Australian Olympic shot putter (1956), aortic rupture.
- John Hayes, 70, American film director, cancer.
- Russ Kerns, 79, American baseball player (Detroit Tigers).
- Daniel Lisulo, 69, Zambian politician.
- Giuseppe Medici, 92, Italian politician.
- Doris Petrie, 82, Canadian film and television actress.
- Gustav Scholz, 70, German boxer, cardiac arrest.
- Ivan Schottel, 78, American football player (Detroit Lions), and coach.
- Andrzej Zawada, 72, Polish mountaineer.

=== 22 ===
- Bill Bradford, 78, American baseball player (Kansas City Athletics).
- George Byer, 88, American politician, heart disease.
- Maxim Cochin, 73, French Olympic boxer (1948).
- Abulfaz Elchibey, 62, Azerbaijani political figure and a Soviet dissident, prostate cancer.
- Charles Kalani, 70, American actor and professional wrestler, heart failure.
- Zdzisław Lesiński, 78, Polish Olympic gymnast (1952).
- Arun Mitra, 90, Indian poet of Bengali.
- Annie Bell Robinson Devine, 88, American activist in the civil rights movement.

=== 23 ===
- Betty Blue, 69, American model and actress, heart failure.
- Muriel Bowen, 74, Irish journalist and politician, complications from a blood disorder.
- Catherine Claude, 75, French novelist.
- Anthony Corallo, 87, American mobster and boss of the Lucchese crime family, natural causes.
- Patricia Jones, 69, Canadian athlete and Olympic medalist (1948).
- John Anthony Kaiser, 67, American priest, shot.
- Rangarajan Kumaramangalam, 48, Indian politician, acute myeloid leukaemia.
- Milivoje Tomić, 80, Serbian actor.
- Marjorie Woodworth, 81, American actress.
- Dindo Yogo, 44, Congolese singer and musician.

=== 24 ===
- Cheng Wu-fei, 88, Chinese painter.
- Renato Dionisi, 90, Italian composer and music educator.
- Luciano Fabbroni, 88, Italian Olympic boxer (1932).
- Andy Hug, 35, Swiss kickboxer, leukemia.
- Bob McPhail, 94, Scottish footballer.
- Ivo Orlandi, 77, Venezuelan Olympic sports shooter (1968).
- Tatiana Riabouchinska, 83, Russian American prima ballerina.
- Kalyanji Virji Shah, 72, Indian film score composer.

=== 25 ===
- Carl Barks, 99, American cartoonist (Scrooge McDuck), chronic lymphocytic leukemia.
- Leo Barnhorst, 76, American basketball player, lymphoma.
- Bernard Becaas, 45, French cyclist, motorcycle crash.
- Frederick C. Bock, 82, American bomber during World War II, cancer.
- Cliff Bruner, 85, American musician and bandleader, cancer.
- Roderick H. Cox, 89, American track and field athlete,football player, teacher, and environmentalist.
- Dennis David, 82, British fighter pilot.
- John Florea, 84, American television director and a photographer.
- Michel Haguenauer, 84, French table tennis player.
- Jack Nitzsche, 63, American musician and film composer (One Flew Over the Cuckoo's Nest, The Exorcist, An Officer and a Gentleman), Oscar winner (1983), infectious disease.
- Valeriy Priyomykhov, 56, Soviet and Russian actor, film director, and author, brain cancer.
- Ginetta Sagan, 75, Italian-American human rights activist, cancer.
- Ivan Stambolić, 63, Serbian politician, shot.
- Peter Swerling, 71, American scientist and radar pioneer, cancer.
- Ramón Torres, 68, American professional wrestler.

=== 26 ===
- Akbar Adibi, 61, Iranian engineer, heart failure.
- Bunny Austin, 94, English tennis player.
- Jim Barrier, 60, American Olympic alpine skier (1960).
- Odette Joyeux, 85, French actress, playwright and novelist, stroke.
- Balan K. Nair, 67, Indian actor, bone cancer.
- Lynden Pindling, 70, Bahamian politician and Prime Minister, prostate cancer.
- Ed Rakow, 65, American baseball player.
- Allen Woody, 44, American bass guitarist (the Allman Brothers Band, Gov't Mule), heroin overdose.
- Wojciech Żukrowski, 84, Polish poet, writer, and literary critic.

=== 27 ===
- Gilbert de Botton, 65, Israeli financial pioneer.
- Denny Chronopoulos, 32, Canadian football player, heart attack.
- Deister, 29, German show jumping horse and European Champion.
- Joseph Lloyd Hogan, 84, American prelate of the Roman Catholic Church.
- Bob Mahoney, 72, American baseball player (Chicago White Sox, St. Louis Browns).

=== 28 ===
- Claudio Alcorso, 87, Italian-Australian entrepreneur.
- Sergei Brushko, 42, Belarusian photographer.
- Knut Holmqvist, 82, Swedish sport shooter and Olympic silver medalist (1952, 1956).
- Khaya Majola, 47, South African cricket player, colon cancer.
- Léa Roback, 96, Canadian trade union organizer, social activist, and feminist, accident.
- Mickey Sullivan, 84, American football player and coach.
- Liao Zhigao, 87, Chinese politician.

=== 29 ===
- Fern Bell, 87, American baseball player (Pittsburgh Pirates).
- Shelagh Fraser, 79, British actress (best known for playing Aunt Beru in Star Wars).
- Mohamed Hamri, 68, Moroccan painter and writer.
- Rose Hobart, 94, American actress and Screen Actors Guild official.
- Per Olof Håkansson, 59, Swedish politician.
- Willie Maddren, 49, English football player and manager, ALS.
- Conrad Marca-Relli, 87, American artist.
- Job Mayo, 58, Filipino Olympic wrestler (1964).
- Marko Todorović, 71, Serbian character actor.
- John Whitfield, 82, Australian rugby league footballer.

=== 30 ===
- David R. Altman, 85, American advertising executive, lymphoma.
- Douglas Robertson Bisset, 92, Scottish sculptor.
- Guillermo Castellanos, 40, Mexican sports shooter and Olympian (1984), shot.
- David Haskell, 52, American actor and singer, brain cancer.
- Joseph H. Lewis, 93, American B-movie film director.
- Hideo Sasaki, 80, American landscape architect.
- Gürdal Tosun, 33, Turkish actor (Bir Demet Tiyatro), kidney failure.

=== 31 ===
- James Booth, 86, British judge and politician.
- Britta Brunius, 88, Swedish film actress.
- Joseph Lennox Federal, 90, American Roman Catholic prelate.
- Lucille Fletcher, 88, American screenwriter, stroke.
- Joan Hartigan, 88, Australian tennis player.
- Les Johnson, 84, Australian public servant and diplomat.
- Saunders King, 91, American guitarist and singer.
- Dolores Moore, 67, American baseball player.
- Francis Dominic Murnaghan Jr., 80, American circuit judge (United States Court of Appeals for the Fourth Circuit).
- Patricia Owens, 75, Canadian-born American actress.
- Yisha'ayahu Schwager, 54, Israeli footballer and Olympian (1968), heart attack.
- Mahavir Shah, 40, Indian actor, car crash.
- John Alexander Simpson, 83, American physicist and science educator, pneumonia.
- Francis Skeat, 91, English glass painter.
- Euan Uglow, 68, British painter, liver cancer.
