= 2000 in film =

The year 2000 in film involved some significant events. The top grosser worldwide was Mission: Impossible 2. Domestically in North America, Gladiator won the Academy Awards for Best Picture and Best Actor (Russell Crowe). Dinosaur was the most expensive film of 2000 and a box-office success.

== Highest-grossing films ==
The top 10 films released in 2000 by worldwide gross are as follows:

Rank	Title	Distributor	Worldwide gross
1	Mission: Impossible 2	Paramount	$546,388,108
2	Gladiator	DreamWorks / Universal	$465,516,248
3	Cast Away	20th Century Fox / DreamWorks	$429,632,142
4	What Women Want	Paramount	$374,111,707
5	Dinosaur	Buena Vista	$349,822,765
6	How the Grinch Stole Christmas	Universal	$346,524,444
7	Meet the Parents	Universal / DreamWorks	$330,444,045
8	The Perfect Storm	Warner Bros.	$328,711,434
9	X-Men	20th Century Fox	$296,339,528
10	What Lies Beneath	DreamWorks / 20th Century Fox	$291,420,351

=== 2000 box office records ===
- Chicken Run became the highest-grossing stop motion animated film ever.
- Dr. Seuss' How the Grinch Stole Christmas's $55.1 million opening weekend became the highest debut for a Christmas-themed film. It had the highest opening weekend for a Jim Carrey film and a Ron Howard film, surpassing both Batman Forever and Ransom simultaneously.

== Events ==
=== Award ceremonies ===
Date	Event	Host	Location	Source
January 22	5th Critics' Choice Awards	Critics Choice Association	West Hollywood, California, U.S.	
January 23	57th Golden Globe Awards	Hollywood Foreign Press Association	Beverly Hills, California, U.S.	
January 29	5th Lumière Awards	Académie des Lumières	Paris, France	
January 29	14th Goya Awards	Academia de las Artes y las Ciencias Cinematográficas de España	Madrid, Spain	
February 13	45th Filmfare Awards	The Times Group	Mumbai, India	
February 19	25th César Awards	French Academy of Cinema Arts and Techniques	Paris, France	
March 2	Producers Guild of America Awards 1999	Producers Guild of America	Beverly Hills, California, U.S.	
March 12	6th Screen Actors Guild Awards	SAG-AFTRA	Los Angeles, California, U.S.	
March 11	52nd Directors Guild of America Awards	Directors Guild of America	Los Angeles, California, U.S.	
March 5	Writers Guild of America Awards 1999	Writers Guild of America, East & Writers Guild of America, West	Manhattan, New York, U.S. & Los Angeles, California, U.S.	
March 25	15th Independent Spirit Awards	Independent Spirit Awards	Santa Monica, California, U.S.	
March 25	20th Golden Raspberry Awards	Golden Raspberry Awards	Hollywood, California, U.S.	
March 26	72nd Academy Awards	Academy of Motion Picture Arts and Sciences	Hollywood, California, U.S.	
April 9	53rd British Academy Film Awards	British Academy of Film and Television Arts	London, England, U.K.	
April 15	13th Kids' Choice Awards	Hollywood Bowl	Los Angeles, U.S.	
April 19	45th David di Donatello	Accademia del Cinema Italiano	Rome, Italy	
June 3	2000 MTV Movie Awards	Sony Pictures Studios	Culver City, California, U.S.	
June 6	26th Saturn Awards	Academy of Science Fiction, Fantasy and Horror Films	Burbank, California, U.S.	
November 11	28th Annie Awards	ASIFA-Hollywood	Los Angeles, California, U.S.	

== Awards ==
Category/Organization	58th Golden Globe Awards January 16, 2001		6th Critics' Choice Awards January 22, 2001	54th BAFTA Awards February 19, 2001	Producers, Directors, Screen Actors, and Writers Guild Awards	73rd Academy Awards March 25, 2001
Category/Organization	Drama	Musical or Comedy	6th Critics' Choice Awards January 22, 2001	54th BAFTA Awards February 19, 2001	Producers, Directors, Screen Actors, and Writers Guild Awards	73rd Academy Awards March 25, 2001
Best Film	Gladiator	Almost Famous	Gladiator			
Best Director	Ang Lee; Crouching Tiger, Hidden Dragon		Steven Soderbergh; Erin Brockovich and Traffic	Ang Lee; Crouching Tiger, Hidden Dragon		Steven Soderbergh; Traffic
Best Actor	Tom Hanks; Cast Away	George Clooney; O Brother, Where Art Thou?	Russell Crowe; Gladiator	Jamie Bell; Billy Elliot	Benicio del Toro; Traffic	Russell Crowe; Gladiator
Best Actress	Julia Roberts; Erin Brockovich	Renée Zellweger; Nurse Betty	Julia Roberts; Erin Brockovich			
Best Supporting Actor	Benicio del Toro; Traffic		Joaquin Phoenix; Gladiator and Quills	Benicio del Toro; Traffic	Albert Finney; Erin Brockovich	Benicio del Toro; Traffic
Best Supporting Actress	Kate Hudson; Almost Famous		Frances McDormand; Almost Famous and Wonder Boys	Julie Walters; Billy Elliot	Judi Dench; Chocolat	Marcia Gay Harden; Pollock
Best Screenplay, Adapted	Stephen Gaghan; Traffic		Stephen Gaghan; Traffic			
Best Screenplay, Original	Stephen Gaghan; Traffic		Cameron Crowe; Almost Famous		Kenneth Lonergan; You Can Count on Me	Cameron Crowe; Almost Famous
Best Animated Film	—N/a	—N/a	Chicken Run	—N/a	—N/a	—N/a
Best Original Score	Gladiator; Hans Zimmer and Lisa Gerrard		Gladiator; The Road to El Dorado; Hans Zimmer	Crouching Tiger, Hidden Dragon; Tan Dun	N/A	Crouching Tiger, Hidden Dragon; Tan Dun
Best Original Song	"Things Have Changed"; Wonder Boys		"My Funny Friend and Me"; The Emperor's New Groove	N/A	N/A	"Things Have Changed"; Wonder Boys
Best Foreign Language Film	Crouching Tiger, Hidden Dragon				N/A	Crouching Tiger, Hidden Dragon

Palme d'Or (53rd Cannes Film Festival):

Dancer in the Dark, directed by Lars von Trier, Denmark

Golden Lion (57th Venice International Film Festival):

The Circle (دایره), directed by Jafar Panahi, Iran

Golden Bear (50th Berlin International Film Festival):

Magnolia, directed by Paul Thomas Anderson, United States

== 2000 films ==
=== By country/region ===
- List of American films of 2000
- List of Argentine films of 2000
- List of Australian films of 2000
- List of Bangladeshi films of 2000
- List of British films of 2000
- List of Canadian films of 2000
- List of Chinese films of 2000
- List of French films of 2000
- List of Hong Kong films of 2000
- List of Indian films of 2000
  - List of Assamese films of the 2000s
  - List of Bengali films of 2000
  - List of Hindi films of 2000
  - List of Kannada films of 2000
  - List of Malayalam films of 2000
  - List of Marathi films of 2000
  - List of Punjabi films of 2000
  - List of Tamil films of 2000
  - List of Telugu films of 2000
- List of Japanese films of 2000
- List of Mexican films of 2000
- List of Pakistani films of 2000
- List of Russian films of 2000
- List of South Korean films of 2000
- List of Spanish films of 2000

=== By genre/medium ===
- List of action films of 2000
- List of animated feature films of 2000
- List of avant-garde films of 2000
- List of crime films of 2000
- List of comedy films of 2000
- List of drama films of 2000
- List of horror films of 2000
- List of science fiction films of 2000
- List of thriller films of 2000
- List of western films of 2000

== Births ==
- January 1 - Ice Spice, American rapper and actress
- January 7 – Marcus Scribner, American actor
- January 8 – Noah Cyrus, American actress and singer
- January 9 – Gordon Maeda, Japanese actor
- January 10 – Reneé Rapp, American actress and singer
- January 11 – Jamie Bick, German actress
- January 17 – Chani, South Korean actor
- January 19 – Asahi Ito, Japanese actor
- January 26 – Ester Expósito, Spanish actress
- January 28 – Julia Lester, American actress
- January 30 - Markella Kavenagh, Australian actress
- February 5
  - Esmé Creed-Miles, English actress
  - Jordan Nagai, American former child voice actor
- February 9 – Evan Roe, American actor
- February 10 – Yara Shahidi, American actress
- February 12 – Asuka Kawazu, Japanese actress
- February 15 – Anson Boon, English actor
- February 16 – Ma Shih-yuan, Taiwanese actress
- February 22 – Celia Rose Gooding, American actress and singer
- February 23 – Christian Martyn, Canadian actor
- February 25 - Tucker Albrizzi, American actor
- February 27 – Tsuyoshi Furukawa, Japanese singer and actor
- February 28 – Jonathan Daviss, American actor
- March 5 – Reiky de Valk, Dutch actor (d. 2023)
- March 6 – Jacob Bertrand, American actor
- March 16 - Fernando Lindez, Spanish actor
- March 21
  - Lorenzo Zurzolo, Italian actor
  - Jace Norman, American actor
- March 22
  - Pawat Chittsawangdee, Thai actor
  - Zoe Terakes, Australian actor
- March 27
  - Halle Bailey, American actress
  - Sophie Nélisse, Canadian actress
- March 31 – Ruby Cruz, American actress
- April 8 – Ella Beatty, American actress
- April 9
  - Brenock O'Connor, English actor
  - Arthur Chen, American-born Chinese actor
- April 11
  - Milly Alcock, Australian actress
  - Morgan Lily, American actress and model
- April 13 – Suzanne Lindon, French actress and filmmaker
- April 16 – Bruna Carvalho, Brazilian actress
- April 20 – Abigail Duhon, American Christian musician and actress
- April 22 – Billy Price, English actor
- May 4 – Nicholas Hamilton, Australian actor
- May 5 - Chase Infiniti, American actress
- May 7 – Maxwell Perry Cotton, American actor
- May 13 – Antonio Cipriano, American actor
- May 18 – Addison Holley, Canadian actress
- May 23 – Ella Rappich, Swedish actress born in South Africa
- May 30 – Jared S. Gilmore, American actor
- June 1 – Willow Shields, American actress
- June 2 - Lilimar Hernandez, American actress
- June 9 - Hazel Moore, American actress
- June 13 – Daniella Perkins, American actress
- June 14 – Thomaz Costa, Brazilian actor
- June 15 – Ouyang Nana, Taiwanese actress, singer and musician
- June 17 – Odessa A'zion, American actress
- June 21 - Natalie Alyn Lind, American actress
- June 22 - Sean Kaufman, American actor
- June 23
  - Kim Hyunsoo, South Korean actress
  - Earl Cave, English actor
  - Caitlin Blackwood, Scottish actress
- June 25 – Iman Benson, American actress
- July 7 – Jamie Flatters, English actor and filmmaker
- July 8
  - Sophie Nyweide, American actress (d. 2025)
  - Benjamin Stockham, American actor
- July 9 – Courtney Grosbeck, American actress and model
- July 13
  - Lucas Lynggaard Tønnesen, Danish actor
  - Malia Pyles, American actress
- July 14 – Maia Reficco, American actress and singer
- July 15 – Julio Peña Fernández, Spanish actor
- July 16 – Jonathan Morgan Heit, American actor
- July 17 – Nico Liersch, German actor
- July 19 – Owen Joyner, American actor
- July 22 – Kaori Oinuma, Filipino-Japanese actress and model
- July 23 – Malte Gårdinger, Swedish actor
- July 25
  - Meg Donnelly, American actress
  - Preston Bailey, American actor
- July 26 – Thomasin McKenzie, New Zealand actress
- July 29 – Lino Facioli, Brazilian actor
- July 31 – Kim Sae-ron, South Korean actress (d. 2025)
- August 3 – Landry Bender, American actress
- August 9 – Kim Hyang-gi, South Korean actress
- August 12 - Savannah Lee Nassif, American actress
- August 13 – Anthony Keyvan, American actor
- August 20 – Fátima Ptacek, American actress and activist
- August 22 - Thomas Weatherall, Australian actor
- August 24 – Griffin Gluck, American actor
- August 28 - Marissa Bode, American actress
- August 29 – Minami Hamabe, Japanese actress
- August 30 - Catherine Lyons, British gymnast
- August 31 – Mia Jenkins, English actress
- September 1 - Cassady McClincy, American actress
- September 3 – Ashley Boettcher, American actress
- September 4 – Ruby Stokes, English actress
- September 9 – Charles Vandervaart, Canadian actor
- September 13 – Siddharth Nigam, Indian actor
- September 14 – Ritvik Sahore, Indian actor
- September 15 – Mallika Singh, Indian actress
- September 22 – Michael Rainey Jr., American actor
- September 25 – Anna Lambe, Canadian Inuk actress from Iqaluit, Nunavut
- September 28 – Frankie Jonas, American actor
- October 4 - Archie Lyndhurst, English actor (d. 2020)
- October 6
  - Klara Castanho, Brazilian actress
  - Addison Rae, American social media personality and actress
  - Isobelle Molloy, English actress
- October 10 – Aedin Mincks, American actor
- October 12 - Mia Threapleton, British actress
- October 16 – David Rawle, Irish actor
- October 18
  - Sophie Thatcher, American actress
  - Conor Sherry, American actor
- October 26 – Ellery Sprayberry, American actress and voice
- October 27 – Lucie Zhang, French actress
- October 31 – Willow Smith, American singer and actress
- November 7 – Dara Reneé, American actress
- November 8 – Jade Pettyjohn, American actress
- November 10 – Mackenzie Foy, American model and actress
- November 13 – Sydney Agudong, American actress and singer
- November 18 – Arabella Morton, Australian actress
- November 21 - Isabel May, American actress
- November 22 – Auliʻi Cravalho, American actress and singer
- November 28
  - Jackson Yee, Chinese actor and singer
  - Kaitlyn Bernard, Canadian actress
- December 9
  - Spike Fearn, English actor
  - Jaren Lewison, American actor
- December 12
  - Devyn Nekoda, Canadian actress
  - Lucas Jade Zumann, American actor
- December 16
  - Rachelle Henry, American actress and filmmaker
  - Lance Lim, American actor
- December 18 – Korapat Kirdpan, Thai actor
- December 19 – Yuumi Kawai, Japanese actress
- December 28 – Larissa Manoela, Brazilian actress
- Khobe Clarke, Canadian actor

== Deaths ==
Month	Date	Name	Age	Country	Profession	Notable films
January	1	George Carl	83	US	Actor, Comedian	Funny Bones
January	5	Vic Schoen	83	US	Composer, Arranger	The Court Jester; Buck Privates
January	7	Klaus Wennemann	59	Germany	Actor	Das Boot; Der Fahnder
January	9	Marguerite Churchill	89	US	Actress	The Big Trail; Dracula's Daughter
January	10	Arthur Batanides	83	US	Actor	Police Academy 2: Their First Assignment; Brannigan
January	11	Helena Carter	79	US	Actress	Invaders from Mars; Kiss Tomorrow Goodbye
January	12	Marc Davis	86	US	Animator	Peter Pan; One Hundred and One Dalmatians
January	15	Fran Ryan	83	US	Actress	Pale Rider; Stripes
January	18	Nancy Coleman	87	US	Actress	Kings Row; Violence
January	18	Frances Drake	87	US	Actress	Les Misérables; It's a Wonderful World
January	18	Jester Hairston	98	US	Actor	In the Heat of the Night; The Alamo
January	19	Hedy Lamarr	85	Austria	Actress	Samson and Delilah; White Cargo
January	19	Alan North	79	US	Actor	Glory; Highlander
January	24	Jeffrey Boam	53	US	Screenwriter	Indiana Jones and the Last Crusade; Lethal Weapon 2
January	25	Tom Pedigo	53	US	Set Decorator	Terms of Endearment; Star Trek III: The Search for Spock
January	28	Tony Doyle	58	Ireland	Actor	The Boxer; Damage
January	28	Joy Shelton	77	UK	Actress	Waterloo Road; Millions Like Us
January	28	Kenneth Waller	72	UK	Actor	Chitty Chitty Bang Bang; Carry On Behind
January	31	Ralph Manza	78	US	Actor	Godzilla; Dave
February	1	James N. Harrell	81	US	Actor	Paper Moon; JFK
February	3	Bonnie Cashin	84	US	Costume Designer	Laura; Nightmare Alley
February	5	Todd Karns	79	US	Actor	It's a Wonderful Life; My Foolish Heart
February	8	Sidney Hayers	78	UK	Director	Circus of Horrors; The Southern Star
February	10	George Jackson	42	US	Producer, Director	New Jack City; Krush Groove
February	10	Jim Varney	50	US	Actor	Ernest Goes to Camp; Toy Story
February	11	Roger Vadim	72	France	Director, Screenwriter	Barbarella; And God Created Woman
February	12	John London	58	US	Key Grip	The Karate Kid; 48 Hrs.
February	16	Marceline Day	91	US	Actress	The Cameraman; London After Midnight
February	16	Lila Kedrova	81	Russia	Actress	Zorba the Greek; Torn Curtain
February	17	Miles White	85	US	Costume Designer	Around the World in 80 Days; The Wiz
February	20	Otello Martelli	97	Italy	Cinematographer	La Dolce Vita; Bitter Rice
February	22	John Kellogg	83	US	Actor	Twelve O'Clock High; The Greatest Show on Earth
February	23	Ofra Haza	42	Israel	Singer, Actress	The Prince of Egypt; The Governess
February	23	Joseph V. Perry	69	US	Actor	Hot Shots! Part Deux; Vibes
February	24	Rosalind Keith	83	US	Actress	Motor Madness; Criminals of the Air
February	27	George Duning	92	US	Composer	From Here to Eternity; 3:10 to Yuma
March	7	Charles Gray	71	UK	Actor	Diamonds are Forever; The Rocky Horror Picture Show
March	10	Judith Barrett	91	US	Actress	Road to Singapore; Cimarron
March	11	Richard Collier	80	US	Actor	Blazing Saddles; Christine
March	13	Rex Everhart	79	US	Actor	Beauty and the Beast; Superman
March	15	Wally Rose	88	US	Actor, Stuntman	The Blues Brothers; Sidekicks
March	25	Jim Cash	59	US	Screenwriter	Top Gun; Dick Tracy
March	25	Helen Martin	90	US	Actress	Don't Be a Menace to South Central While Drinking Your Juice in the Hood; Bulworth
March	27	Ian Dury	57	UK	Singer, Actor	The Cook, the Thief, His Wife & Her Lover; Judge Dredd
March	29	John Baskcomb	84	UK	Actor	Chitty Chitty Bang Bang; Oliver
April	??	Maurice Carter	85–86	UK	Art Director	The Lady Vanishes; Battle of Britain
April	2	Greta Gynt	83	Norway	Actress	Dear Murderer; Take My Life
April	8	Claire Trevor	90	US	Actress	Stagecoach; Key Largo
April	10	Arnold Johnson	78	US	Actor	Rocky; Shaft
April	10	Peter Jones	79	UK	Actor	Chariots of Fire; The Return of the Pink Panther
April	11	Douglas Green	79	US	Second Unit Director	Cabaret; Lenny
April	12	Carmen Dillon	91	UK	Art Director	The Omen; Hamlet
April	12	Christopher Pettiet	24	US	Actor	Point Break; Don't Tell Mom the Babysitter's Dead
April	13	Peter Archer	56	Australia	Actor	Enter the Dragon
April	21	Susan Stephen	68	UK	Actress	Pacific Destiny; For Better, for Worse
April	25	David Merrick	88	US	Producer	The Great Gatsby; Semi-Tough
May	1	Steve Reeves	74	US	Actor	Hercules; Duel of the Titans
May	3	Lewis Allen	94	UK	Director	Suddenly; The Uninvited
May	7	Douglas Fairbanks Jr.	90	US	Actor	Little Caesar; Gunga Din
May	10	Bart the Bear	23	US	Actor	The Bear; Legends of the Fall
May	10	Craig Stevens	81	US	Actor	Buchanan Rides Alone; Gunn
May	11	David Bretherton	76	US	Film Editor	Cabaret; Clue
May	11	René Muñoz	62	Cuba	Actor, Screenwriter	Fray Escoba; Cristo negro
May	13	Paul Bartel	61	US	Actor, Director	Eating Raoul; Death Race 2000
May	20	Edward Bernds	94	US	Director	The Three Stooges Meet Hercules; Return of the Fly
May	21	John Gielgud	96	UK	Actor	Becket; Arthur
May	25	Nicholas Clay	53	UK	Actor	Excalibur; Evil Under the Sun
May	25	Francis Lederer	100	Czech Republic	Actor	The Man I Married; The Return of Dracula
May	26	William McCaughey	70	US	Sound Engineer	Rocky; The Deer Hunter
May	26	Samuel A. Taylor	87	US	Screenwriter	Sabrina; Vertigo
May	26	Sō Yamamura	90	Japan	Actor	Tora! Tora! Tora!; Gung Ho
May	28	Robert Fryer	79	US	Producer	The Shining; The Boys from Brazil
May	29	Aubrey Richards	79	UK	Actor	The Ipcress File; The Man Who Haunted Himself
May	30	Doris Hare	95	UK	Actress	On the Buses; Mutiny on the Buses
May	30	Bill Thomas	78	US	Costume Designer	Spartacus; Babes in Toyland
May	31	Walter Sparrow	73	UK	Actor	Robin Hood: Prince of Thieves; Ever After
June	10	Terry Forrestal	52	UK	Stuntman	Titanic; Braveheart
June	10	J. Watson Webb Jr.	84	US	Film Editor	Kiss of Death; Cheaper by the Dozen
June	11	Elizabeth Lawrence	77	US	Actress	The Crucible; Sleeping with the Enemy
June	13	John Bramall	76	UK	Sound Engineer	Straw Dogs; Where Eagles Dare
June	18	Nancy Marchand	71	US	Actress	Sabrina; The Naked Gun: From the Files of Police Squad!
June	19	Anton Gorchev	60	Bulgaria	Actor	The Goat Horn; Thorn Apple
June	24	David Tomlinson	83	UK	Actor	Mary Poppins; Tom Jones
June	27	David Neal	68	UK	Actor	Flash Gordon; Superman
June	28	Nils Poppe	92	Sweden	Actor	The Seventh Seal; The Devil's Eye
June	28	Michael Ripper	87	UK	Actor	Oliver Twist; The Spy Who Came in from the Cold
June	29	John Abineri	72	UK	Actor	The Godfather Part III; The McKenzie Break
June	29	Vittorio Gassman	77	Italy	Actor	War and Peace; Sleepers
July	1	Walter Matthau	79	US	Actor	The Fortune Cookie; The Odd Couple
July	3	Harold Nicholas	79	US	Dancer, Actor	Sun Valley Serenade; Funny Bones
July	3	Kemal Sunal	55	Turkey	Actor	King of the Doormen; Hababam Sınıfı
July	10	Justin Pierce	25	UK	Actor	Kids; Next Friday
July	14	Meredith MacRae	56	US	Actress	Bikini Beach; Norwood
July	18	Roberto Contreras	71	US	Actor	Scarface; Topaz
July	19	James B. Clark	92	US	Director, Film Editor	Flipper; How Green Was My Valley
July	22	Eric Christmas	84	UK	Actor	Harold and Maude; Air Bud
July	27	Don Weis	78	US	Director	The Affairs of Dobie Gillis; Critic's Choice
July	30	Nan Leslie	74	US	Actress	Under the Tonto Rim; The Woman on the Beach
July	30	Max Showalter	83	US	Actor	Sixteen Candles; 10
August	5	Alec Guinness	86	UK	Actor	The Bridge on the River Kwai; Star Wars
August	8	Jess Barker	88	US	Actor	Reign of Terror; Scarlet Street
August	8	John F. Warren	91	US	Cinematographer	Torn Curtain; The Country Girl
August	9	Lewis Wilson	80	US	Actor	Batman; Once Upon a Time
August	10	Joan Marsh	86	US	Actress	Anna Karenina; Road to Zanzibar
August	11	Eddie Powell	73	UK	Stuntman	Alien; Indiana Jones and the Last Crusade
August	12	Loretta Young	87	US	Actress	The Farmer's Daughter; The Bishop's Wife
August	15	Robert Swink	82	US	Film Editor	Roman Holiday; The Diary of Anne Frank
August	22	Toru Tanaka	70	US	Actor	Last Action Hero; Darkman
August	24	Patricia Owens	75	Canada	Actress	Sayonara; The Fly
August	25	Jack Nitzsche	63	US	Composer	One Flew Over the Cuckoo's Nest; The Exorcist
August	29	Rose Hobart	94	US	Actress	Dr. Jekyll and Mr. Hyde; Conflict
August	30	Joseph H. Lewis	93	US	Director	Gun Crazy; My Name Is Julia Ross
September	2	Ishaq Bux	83	India	Actor	Raiders of the Lost Ark; The Rocky Horror Picture Show
September	2	Jean Speegle Howard	73	US	Actress	Apollo 13; Scrooged
September	3	Edward Anhalt	86	US	Screenwriter	Jeremiah Johnson; Becket
September	3	Walt Stanchfield	81	US	Animator	Who Framed Roger Rabbit; The Jungle Book
September	7	Gian Luigi Polidoro	73	Italy	Director	Il diavolo; Run for Your Wife
September	10	Mary Colquhoun	59	UK	Casting Director	Glory; After Hours
September	12	Juan Ibáñez	83	Mexico	Director	Isle of the Snake People; Fear Chamber
September	12	Gary Olsen	55	Australia	Actor, Key Grip	Pink Floyd – The Wall; The Cook, the Thief, His Wife & Her Lover
September	14	Beah Richards	80	US	Actress	In the Heat of the Night; Guess Who's Coming to Dinner
September	19	Ann Doran	89	US	Actress	Rebel Without a Cause; Wildcats
September	19	Gloria Talbott	69	US	Actress	I Married a Monster from Outer Space; The Daughter of Dr. Jekyll
September	26	Richard Mulligan	67	US	Actor	Little Big Man; S.O.B.
October	2	Richard Liberty	68	US	Actor	Day of the Dead; The Crazies
October	6	Richard Farnsworth	80	US	Actor	Misery; The Straight Story
October	9	David Dukes	55	US	Actor	The First Deadly Sin; Only When I Laugh
October	10	Emile Kuri	93	Mexico	Set Decorator	It's a Wonderful Life; Mary Poppins
October	11	Sam O'Steen	76	US	Film Editor	The Graduate; Chinatown
October	12	Gordon Stulberg	76	Canada	Studio Executive	
October	13	Jean Peters	73	US	Actress	Pickup on South Street; It Happens Every Spring
October	15	Vincent Canby	76	US	Film Critic	None; critiqued films for The New York Times
October	17	Walter Shenson	81	UK	Producer, Director	From Here to Eternity; A Hard's Day Night
October	18	Julie London	74	US	Actress, Singer	Man of the West; The Great Man
October	18	Sidney Salkow	89	US	Director	Sitting Bull; Twice-Told Tales
October	18	Gwen Verdon	75	US	Actress, Dancer	Damn Yankees; Cocoon
October	21	Mort Briskin	86	US	Producer, Screenwriter	Walking Tall; Framed
October	22	Anthony Chinn	69	Guyana	Actor	Raiders of the Lost Ark; The Fifth Element
October	24	Pasquale Cajano	79	Italy	Actor	Casino; Analyze This
October	26	Muriel Evans	90	US	Actress	Manhattan Melodrama; House of Secrets
October	28	Anthony Lee	39	US	Actor	Liar Liar; American Strays
October	30	Steve Allen	78	US	Actor	The Benny Goodman Story; College Confidential
October	30	Elizabeth Bradley	83	UK	Actress	An American Werewolf in London; Davy Jones' Locker
October	31	Ring Lardner Jr.	85	US	Screenwriter	MASH; The Cincinnati Kid
November	1	Allan Surtees	75	UK	Actor	Frankenstein Must Be Destroyed; Eye of the Needle
November	3	Leonardo Benvenuti	77	Italy	Screenwriter	Once Upon a Time in America; Alfredo, Alfredo
November	11	Rayford Barnes	80	US	Actor	The Wild Bunch; The Hunting Party
November	22	Christian Marquand	73	France	Actor, Director	The Flight of the Phoenix; The Longest Day
November	26	Carlo Simi	76	Italy	Costume Designer, Production Designer	The Good, the Bad and the Ugly; For a Few Dollars More
November	27	Anne Barton	76	US	Actress	What Ever Happened to Baby Jane?; The Comancheros
November	27	George Wells	91	US	Screenwriter	Angels in the Outfield; Take Me Out to the Ball Game
November	29	Margaret Early	80	US	Actress	Strike Up the Band; Jezebel
December	4	Chet Douglas	64	US	Actor	Two Rode Together; Papa's Delicate Condition
December	6	Werner Klemperer	80	Germany	Actor	Judgment at Nuremberg; Houseboat
December	10	Marie Windsor	80	US	Actress	The Narrow Margin; The Killing
December	11	Don Devlin	70	US	Producer, Screenwriter	Thunder Island; Loving
December	11	David Lewis	84	US	Actor	The Apartment; The Absent-Minded Professor
December	11	N. Richard Nash	87	US	Screenwriter	Porgy and Bess; The Rainmaker
December	12	George Montgomery	84	US	Actor	Coney Island; Battle of the Bulge
December	14	Uldis Pūcītis	63	Latvia	Actor, Director	Purva bridējs; Elpojiet dziļi Gaisma tuneļa galā
December	16	Margo Moore	69	US	Actress	Wake Me When It's Over; Hound-Dog Man
December	20	Richard Hazard	79	US	Composer, Orchestrator	Terms of Endearment; Nickelodeon
December	22	Stuart Lancaster	80	US	Actor	Edward Scissorhands; Batman Returns
December	23	Billy Barty	76	US	Actor	Mickey McGuire; Willow
December	23	Noor Jehan	75	Pakistan	Singer, Actress	Sheela; Jugnu
December	26	Leo Gordon	78	US	Actor, Screenwriter	My Name Is Nobody; The Man Who Knew Too Much
December	26	Jason Robards	77	US	Actor	All the President's Men; Once Upon a Time in the West
December	30	Julius J. Epstein	91	US	Screenwriter	Casablanca; Arsenic and Old Lace

== Film debuts ==
- Malin Åkerman − The Skulls
- Jamie Bell − Billy Elliot
- Roger Casamajor − The Sea
- John Cena − Ready to Rumble
- Michael Cera − Frequency
- Abbie Cornish – The Monkey's Mask
- Terry Crews − The 6th Day
- Paul Dano − The Newcomers
- David Denman – The Replacements
- Chris Evans − The Newcomers
- Fares Fares – Jalla! Jalla!
- Darcy Fehr – Desire
- Isla Fisher − Out of Depth
- Dolores Fonzi − Burnt Money
- Martin Freeman – The Low Down
- Gael García Bernal – Amores perros
- Rick Gonzalez – Mambo Café
- Topher Grace − Traffic
- Jon Hamm − Space Cowboys
- Jay Hernandez – Living the Life
- Óscar Jaenada − What You Never Knew
- Michelle Jenner – Faust: Love of the Damned
- John Krasinski – State and Main
- Clara Lago − Miserable Life
- Christine Lakin – Finding Kelly
- Rachelle Lefevre – Stardom
- Anson Mount – Boiler Room
- Rachel Nichols − Autumn in New York
- Aaron Paul – Whatever It Takes
- Josh Peck − Snow Day
- Lucy Punch – Greenfingers
- Dominic Purcell – Mission: Impossible 2
- Maggie Q – Model from Hell
- Kelly Reilly – Maybe Baby
- Michelle Rodriguez − Girlfight
- Zoe Saldaña − Center Stage
- Bill Skarsgård – White Water Fury
- Hugo Silva − Miserable Life
- Jimmi Simpson – Loser
- Kasia Smutniak – At the Right Moment
- Kristen Stewart − The Flintstones in Viva Rock Vegas
- Juno Temple – Pandaemonium
- Kerry Washington − Our Song
- Sam Worthington − Bootmen
- Anton Yelchin – A Man Is Mostly Water
- Aaliyah – Romeo Must Die

== See also ==
- List of 2000 box office number-one films in the United States
