= Ulrik Birch =

Danish aviator

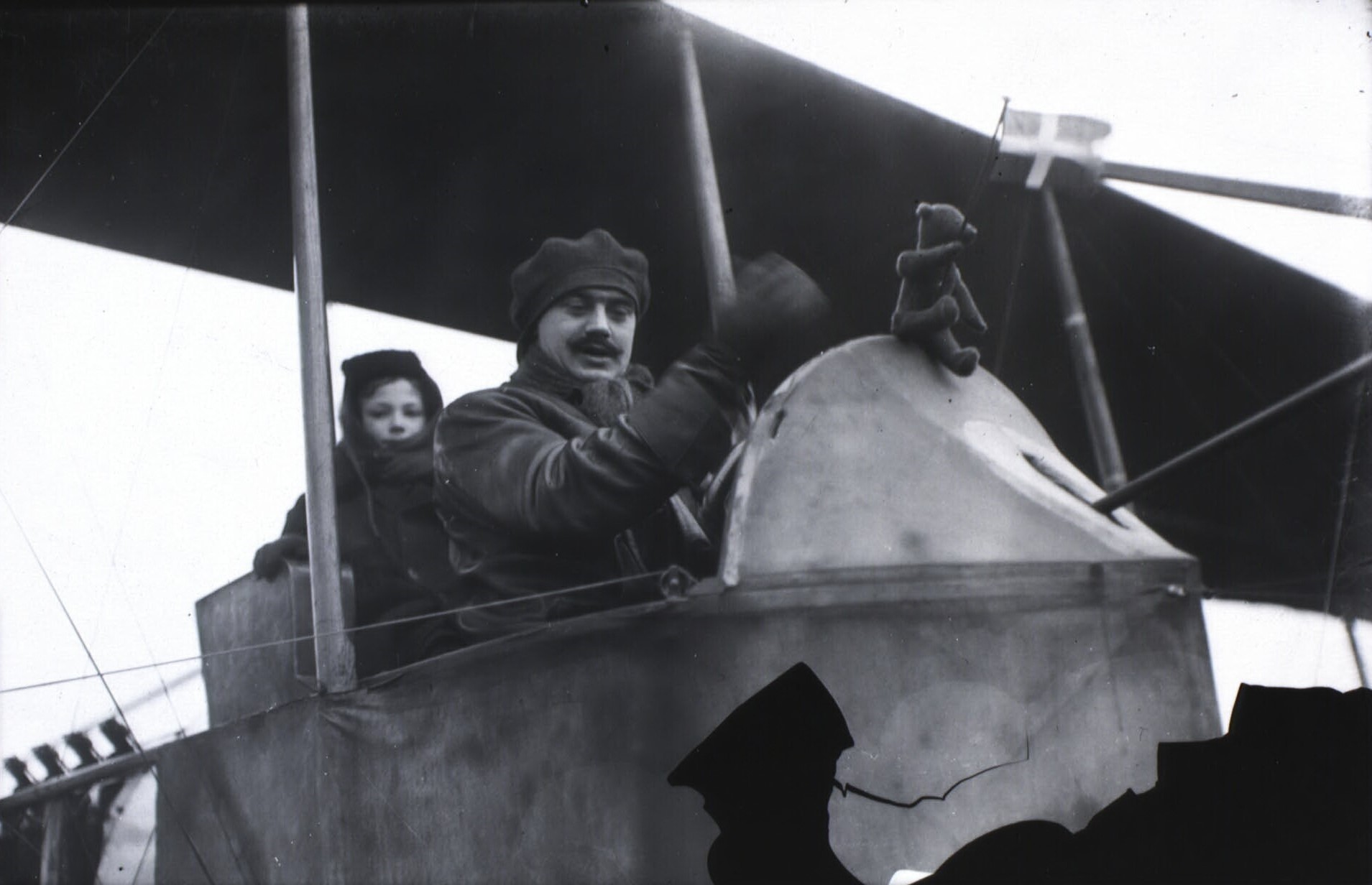
Ulrik Birch photographed in his aircraft by Holger Damgaard in 1912.

Ulrik Johan Carl Birch (25 October 1883 – 10 October 1913) was a Danish aviation pioneer. He died from his injuries after crashing with his aircraft Ørnen at Kløvermarken in October 1913. He was the first Danish aviator killed in an aircraft accident. In 1916, the Danish Aeronautical Society erected a memorial stone for Birch at Staunings Plads in Fælledparken. In 2007, it was moved to a new location close to the Danish Aviators Memorial in Enveloppeparken on Amager.

== Biography ==
Birch was born on 25 October 1883 in Copenhagen, the son of book printer Carl Christian Birch (1845–98) and Anne Elisabeth Eriksen (1860–1928). He was trained as a book printer as his father. He received his first training as an aviator at Robert Svendsen's aviation school in Christianshavn. In 1911, he moved to Paris to attend the aviation school in Issy-les-Molinea. It was here he completed his first solo flight. Later in the same year, he was admitted to the Aérodrome d'Étampes - Mondésir in Étampes where he studied under Maurice Chevillard.When he was about to obtain his pilot's license on May 9, 1811, he crashed his plane and broke one leg.

When he was about to obtain his pilot's certificate on 9 May 1811, he crashed his plane and broke one leg. Still not fully recovered from his injuries, he finally received his pilot's license in 1912. After returning home, he began flying with passengers from Tivoli Gardens. He also served as instructor for Prince Axel.

On 3 August 1912, he was wed to Dagmar Elise (Lilly) Løvenskiold Berg (1887–1968) in St. Matthew's Church in Copenhagen. She was a daughter of businessman Thorvald Jakobsen Berg (1851–1909) and Hermine (Mimi) Jørgine Mathilde Oline Løvenskiold (adopted, née Jørgensen, (1862–1941). As their honeymoon, Birch and his wife toured Eastern Denmark in his aircraft, amid great media attention.

In 1913, Birch was employed as instructor in the Royal Danish Navy's Air Corps. He was therefore sent back to Paris to learn to fly a seaplane. Not long after returning to Copenhagen, early in October of that year, he crashed his plane, Ørnen (lot. "The Eagle"), atto Kløvermarken. He died from his injuries just a few days later. He was the first Danish aviator killed in an aviation accident. He is interred at Bispebjerg Cemetery.

== Legacy ==
In 1916, the Danish Aeronautical Society erected a memorial stone for Birch at Staunings Plads in Fælledparken. In 2007, it was moved to a new location close to the Danish Aviators Memorial in Enveloppeparken on Amager.

The street Ulrik Birchs ALlé in Sundbyvester on Amager is named after Birch. The street was established in circa 1915. The street Ulrik Birchs Vej in Vadum is also named after him. It is part of a cluster of streets named for Danish aviation pioneers.
