= Chien-Ying Chang =

British painter (1913–2003)

- Self-portrait (1936)
- Born: 張茜英; 25 May 1913; Wuxi, China
- Died: 7 November 2003 (aged 90); Finchley, London, England
- Resting place: Kenwood House
- Education: Nanjing University; Slade School of Art
- Known for: Oil painting, Chinese ink painting
- Spouse: Cheng Wu-fei

Chien-Ying Chang (25 May 1913 – 7 November 2003) was a Chinese-born painter who settled in Britain in 1946.

== Early life ==
Chien-Ying Chang was the daughter of a customs official and attended Wuxi secondary school, after which she studied art at the Nanjing University between 1931 and 1935. At Nanjing she met her future husband, Cheng-Wu Fei. Influenced by Xu Beihong, she helped him found the China Institute of Fine Arts in Chongqing. He had studied western painting techniques in London after the First World War, and urged her to do so too. She and Cheng-Wu Fei subsequently won British Council grants to study in Britain, both enrolling at the Slade School of Art from 1947 to 1950 and working under Randolph Schwabe and William Coldstream.

== Career in Britain ==
Following the communist takeover of China, Chien-Ying Chang and Cheng-Wu Fei decided to make Britain their home, pursuing various interests for some 50 years. Their exhibitions at the Royal Academy, the Royal Society of Painters in Watercolours, the Society of Women Artists, and at numerous private galleries, soon attracted the attention of figures such as the painter Stanley Spencer and Mrs Clement Attlee, wife of the prime minister. Spencer was present at the couple's marriage at a Kensington registry office in 1953. He painted several portraits of Chien-Ying Chang, and was in turn painted by Cheng-Wu Fei. They visited Spencer at Cookham in Berkshire, where Chien-Ying prepared a Chinese meal for him. Spencer came up to London when the couple were about to leave England by boat. Cheng-Wu Fei became ill, and their journey was postponed and eventually cancelled. This was fortuitous as they later learned that the new Chinese regime did not take kindly to the Western ideas brought back by returning artists.

The couple remained in Britain, admiring its landscape and rain reminiscent of China. On expeditions to the Lake District and Devon, Chien-Ying Chang created paintings with a distinctly Chinese mood. She still worked on rice paper, giving her work a delicate quality. They bought a house in Finchley in north London, filling the garden with oriental plants, while Chien-Ying Chang decorated the inside walls with landscape murals.

== Design work ==
'Fishes' (1955)

Her husband confined himself to an academic career, while Chien-Ying Chang toured the country demonstrating the traditional painting techniques of China. Her home cooking skills were taught at Kenneth Lo's Chinese cookery school, and she also appeared on his television programme 'The Taste of China'. The delicate brush strokes she employed in her paintings came from her skill as a calligrapher, leading to many commissions to illustrate books of poems and several film-sets about China. She painted street signs and was involved in the costume design for productions such as The Inn of the Sixth Happiness and The World of Suzy Wong. Her work for The Road to Hong Kong led to a friendship with the American comedian Bob Hope, while she also designed a silk pattern with swallows for the fashion designer Christian Dior, and sang in Peking Opera productions, singing both male and female roles. In later years she became well known as the artist behind a series of prints of birds and landscapes which graced homes throughout the country. Her work was part of the painting event in the art competition at the 1948 Summer Olympics. On the death of her husband she visited Shanghai, finding that the place had changed beyond all recognition.
