= Einar Utzon-Frank =

Danish sculptor

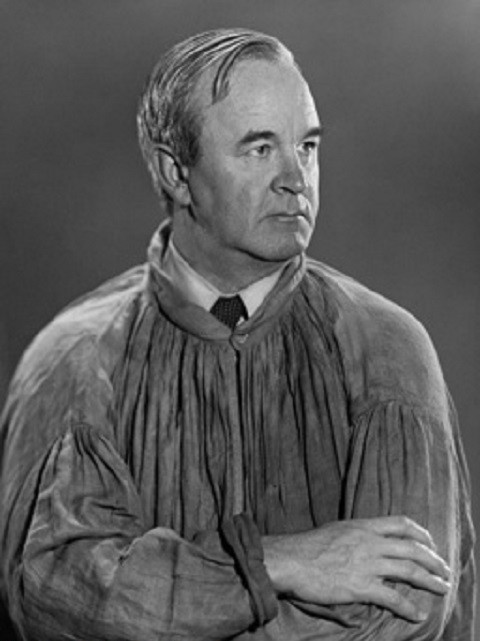
- Born: 30 March 1858; Frederisberg, Denmark
- Died: 15 July 1955 (aged 67); Asserbo, Denmark
- Education: Royal Danish Academy of Fine Arts
- Known for: Sculpting

Aksel (Axel) Einar (Ejnar) Utzon-Frank (30 March 1888 – 15 July 1955) was a Danish sculptor and professor at the Royal Danish Academy of Fine Arts. During his lifetime, he produced many sculptures, some of which stand as public monuments. Utzon-Frank was son of Jens Christian Frank and Anna Cathrine Utzon. Anna Cathrine was sister to the grandfather of Pritzker Prize-winning architect Jørn Utzon.

== Early life and education ==
Einar Utzon-Frank was born in the Frederiksberg district of Copenhagen in 1888, the son of Jens Christian Frank and Anna Cathrine Utzon.

Utzon-Frank began his artistic life as a painter but changed direction to become a sculptor. He was admitted to the Royal Danish Academy of Fine Arts in 1906, where he became a close friend of the somewhat older Kai Nielsen. However, the two friends followed diverging paths through their creative careers, with Nielsen following a lush modernism in contrast to Utzon-Frank's clear, cool classical style which follows the tradition of Bertel Thorvaldsen.

From 1912 to 1913 Utzen-Frank travelled around Europe, visiting Berlin, Dresden, Munich, Florence, Rome, Naples, Paestum, Paris and later Italy, Greece and England, and many of the classical influences from his travels are evident in his work.

== Career ==
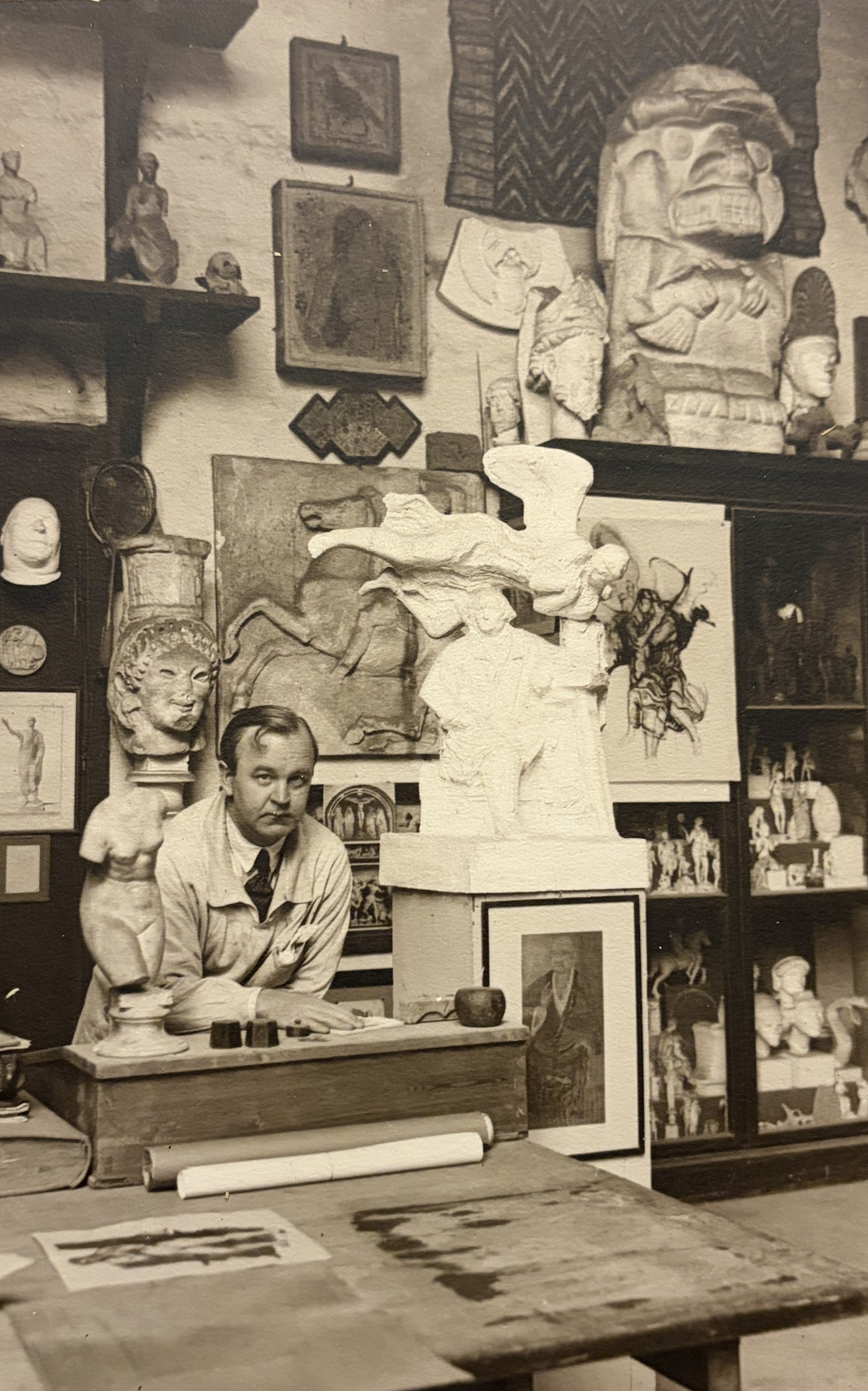
Utzon-Frank in his studio

At the end of the 1930s he was commissioned to recast the equestrian statue of Christian V — originally erected between 1687 and 1688 on Kongens Nytorv and made from gilded lead by Abraham-César Lamoureux — in bronze, which he did between 1939 and 1942. His work was part of the sculpture event in the art competition at the 1932 Summer Olympics.

== Academia ==
In 1918 at the age of 30, Utzon-Frank was appointed a professor at the Royal Danish Academy of Art in Copenhagen, a post in which he remained until 1955. In his teaching, he laid emphasis on solid craftsmanship skills. He was a teacher and educator of great importance and came to dominate several generations of sculptors, including Henry Heerup, Sigrid Lütken, Janus Kamban, Anne Marie Carl-Nielsen, Gestur Þorgrímsson and Douglas Robertson Bisset.

== Private life ==
Utzon-Frank married Gerda Harriet Margrete Christensen on 4 December 1908. Their daughter Grete Utzon Frank was born on 8 February 1909 in Copenhagen. She married painter and author William Flemming Bergsøe on 21 March 1930.

== Works ==
His best-known works include:

- Knælende Aphrodite (1916)
- Atalante (1919), depicting the woman Atalanta from Greek mythology. This bronze statue is placed in the central park of Rådhusparken in Aarhus.
- Slangedræber, the Police Headquarters, Copenhagen (1924)
- Beatrice as poesiens genius, Dantesøjlen, Copenhagen (1924), sold in 2003 for 28,000 DKK
- Sarkofag for Frederik VIII, Roskilde Cathedral, Roskilde, Denmark
- Hamlet Memorial Grave, Marienlyst Park, Helsingør (1926)
- Erik of Pomerania (1926)
- Youth, Enghaveparken, Copenhagen (1933)
- The Weather Girls, Richshuset, Copenhagen (1936)
- Knud the Holy, Odense, Denmark (1944)
- Danish Aviators Memorial, Envoloppeparken, Copenhagen (1938)
- Christian X (Equestrian statue), Sankt Annæ Plads, Copenhagen (1954)
- Thorvaldsen (1953)

== Gallery ==
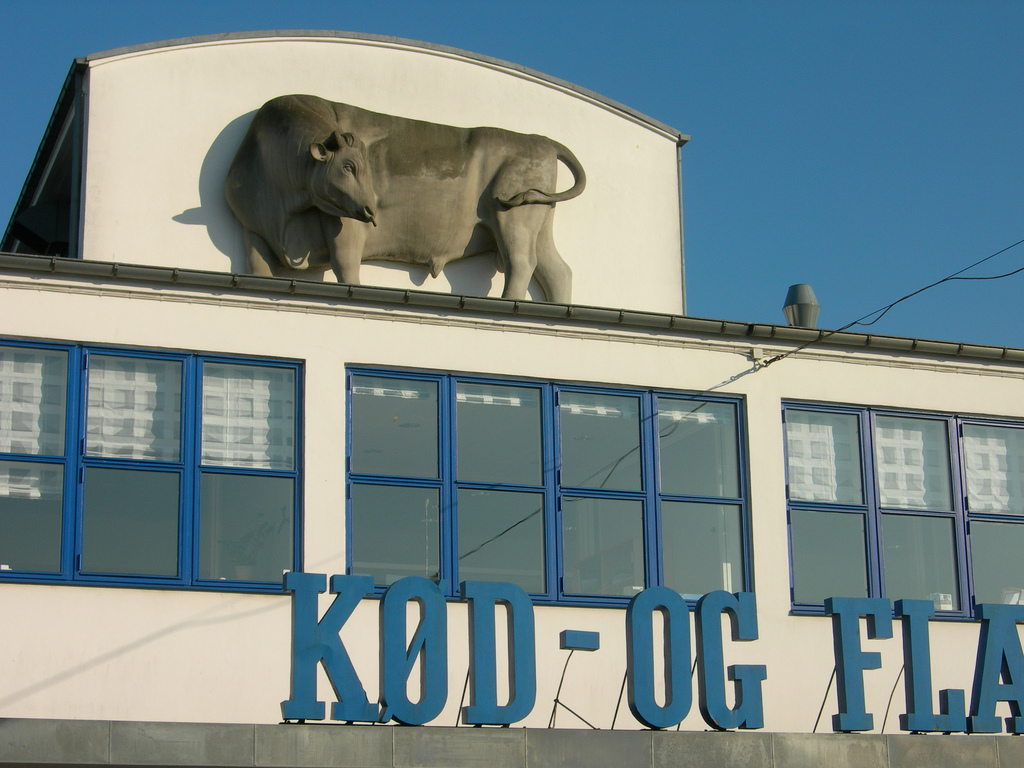
Bull, Kødbyen, Copenhagen

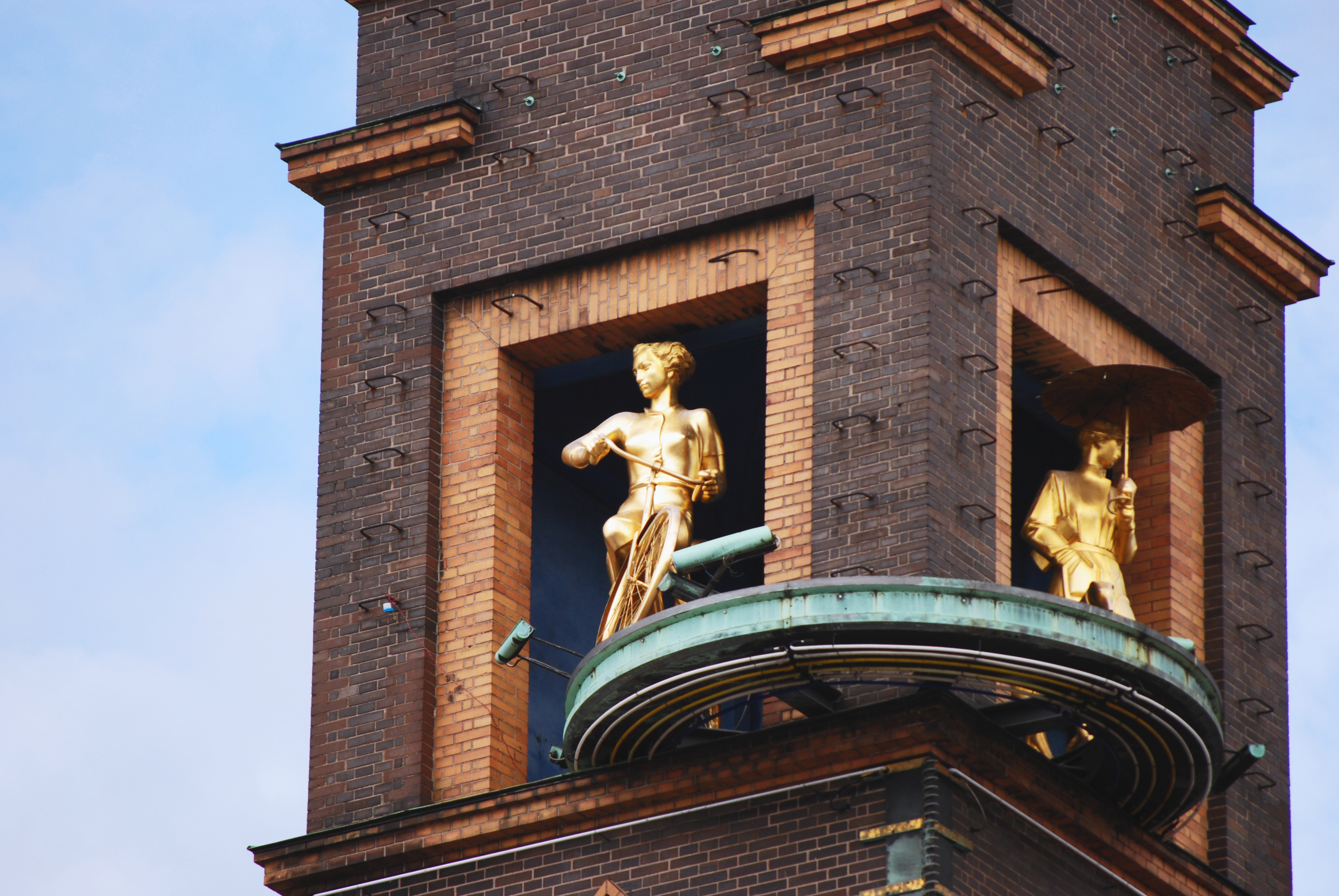
The mobile, weather-forecasting sculpture The Weather Girls at the City Hall Square in Copenhagen

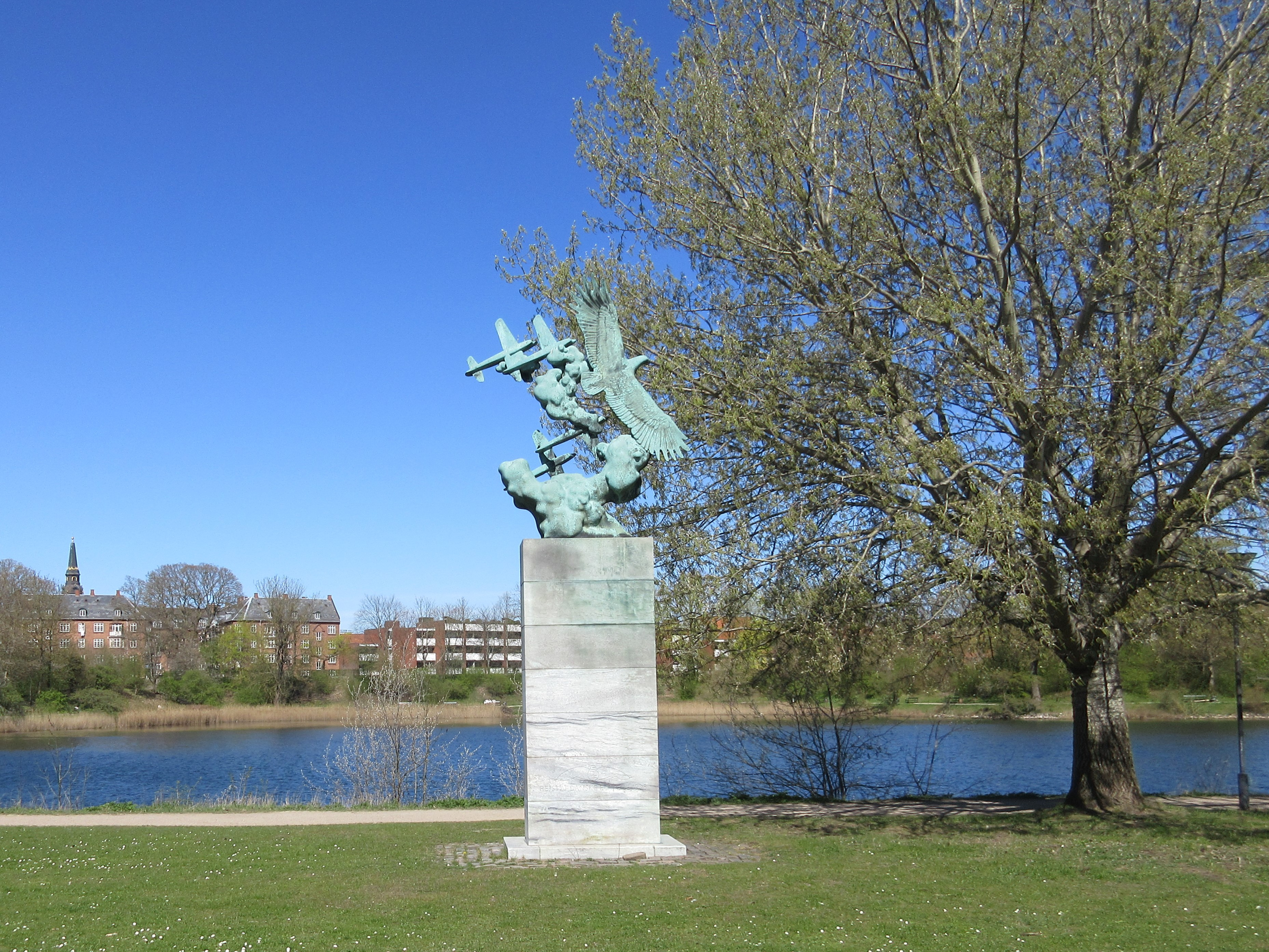
Danish Aviators Memorial, Copenhagen (1039)

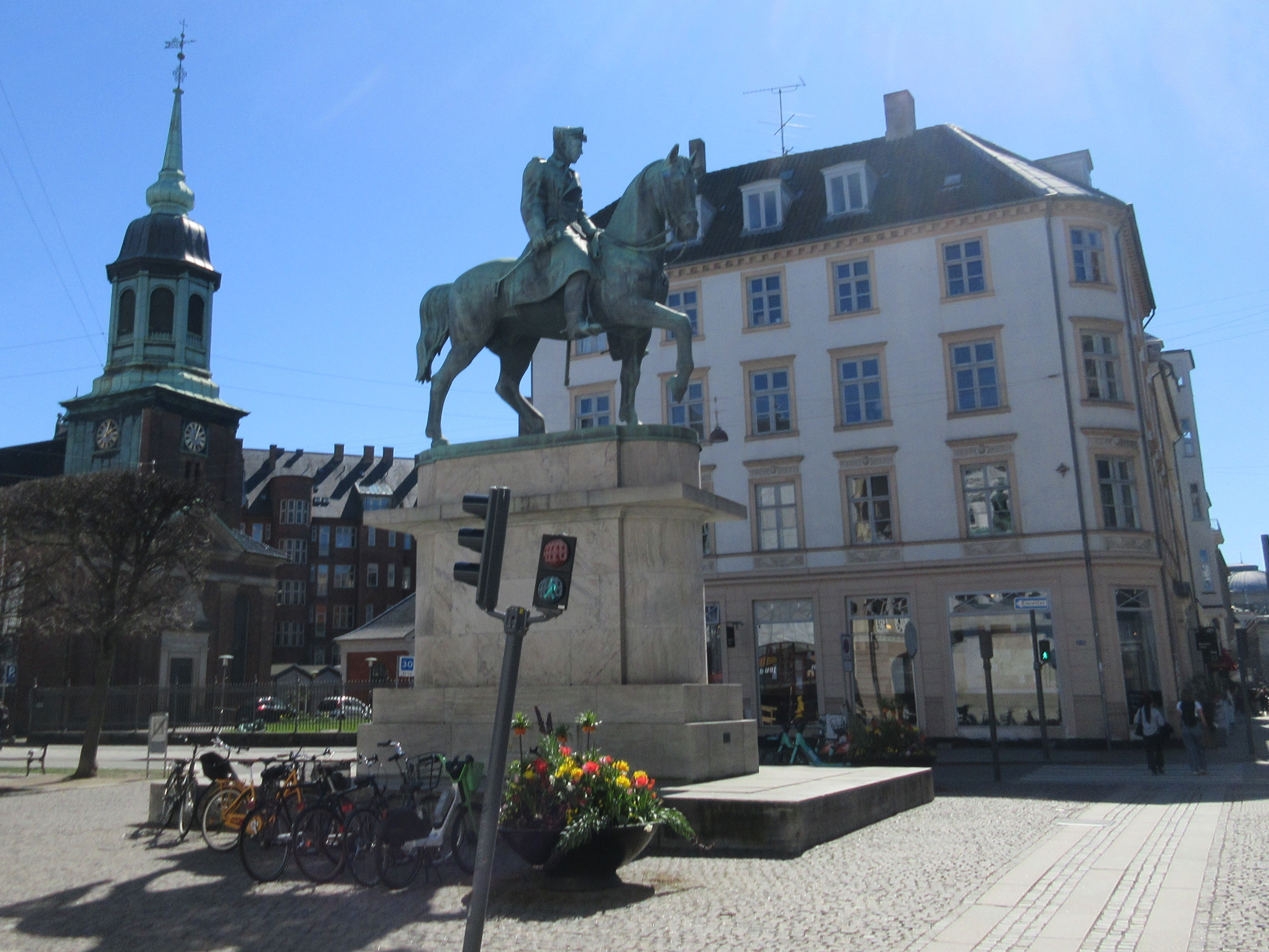
Christian X, Copenhagen (1954)

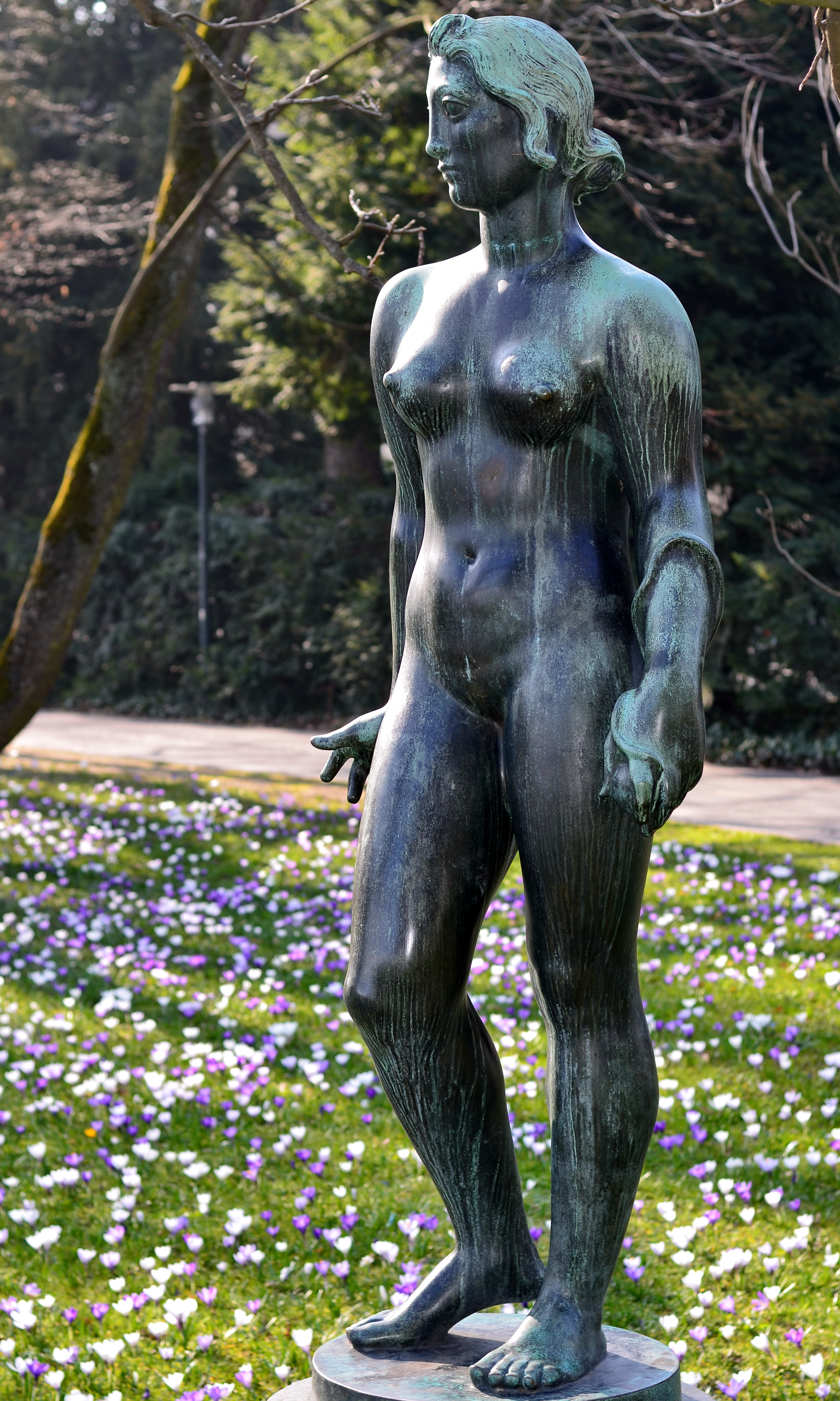
Aphrodite at the Arboretum Zürich in Switzerland

== See also ==
- Art of Denmark
