= Christianshavns Enveloppe =

Historic site in Copenhagen, Denmark

Enveloppeparken and Dyssen
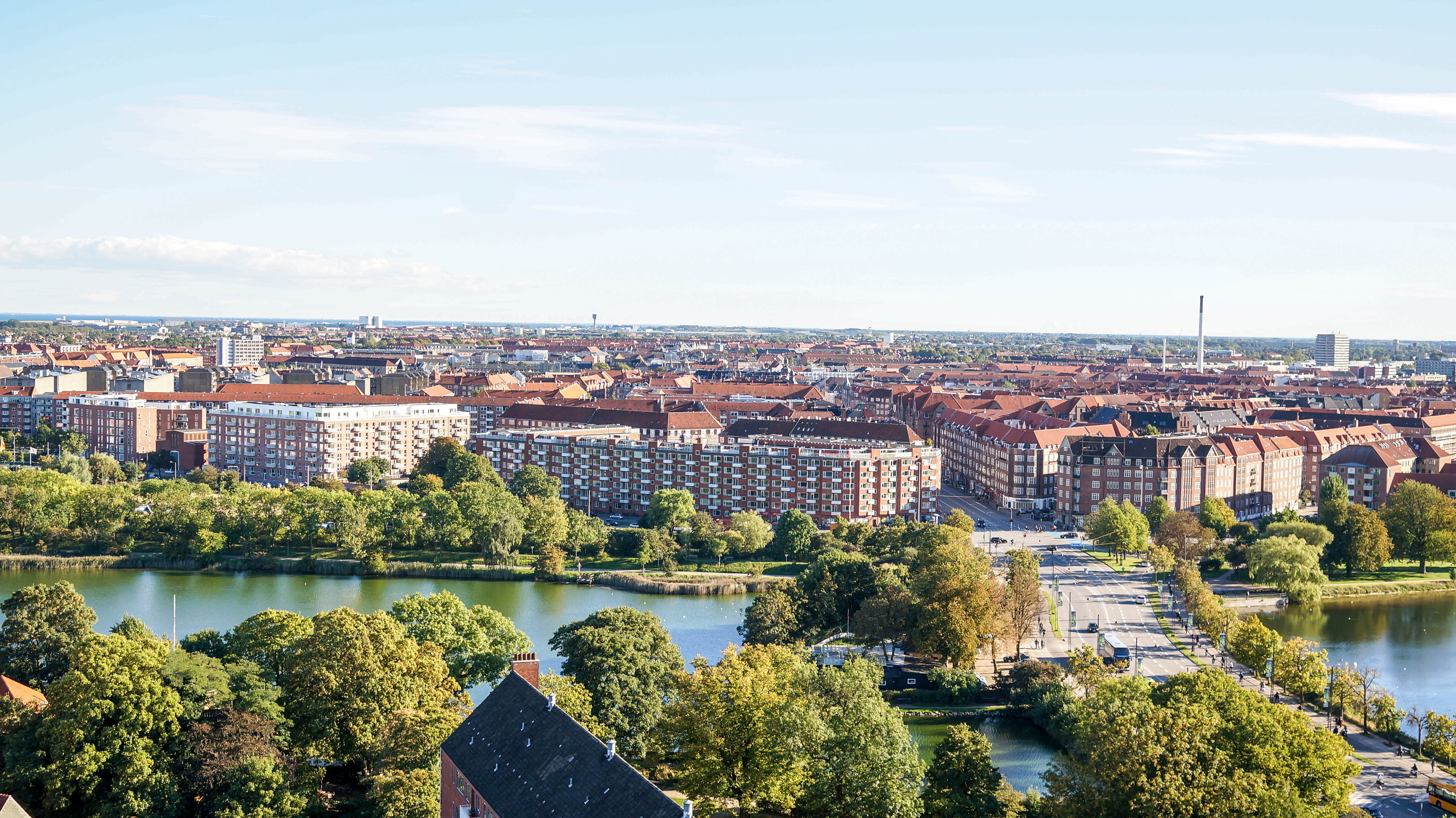
- Christianshavns Enveloppe viewed from the tower of Church of Our Saviour on the other side of Stadsgraven
- Interactive map of Enveloppeparken and Dyssen
- Type: Public park and historic site
- Location: Amager, Copenhagen
- Coordinates: 55.6738°N 12.6081°E
- Created: 1934 (Enveloppeparken) and 1971 (Dyssen)

Christianshavns Enveloppe is a former system of outworks located in front of Christianshavns Vold and Stadsgraven, on Amager. in Copenhagen, Denmark. Its well-preserved, northern half is now part of Freetown Christiania and known as Dyssen. Its southern portion was removed in the first half of the 20th century and has now been replaced by a public park, Enveloppeparken.

== History ==
Christianhavns Vold was one of four ramparts that used to surround Copenhagen. Christianshavns Enveloppe was constructed on the City Moat's Counterscarp in 1779-91. It ran from Quinti Lynette in the north to Kalvebods Lynette in the south and comprised 10 redans which were numbered 1-10 from the north. The navy constructed four gunpowder magazines with associated guardhouses at the 2nd to 5th redan in 1779-81. An extra moat, a so-called avant-foss, was dug out in front of the structure in 1810-13.

It was renovated and a wooden footbridge was built across the inner and outer city moat. The two redans furthest to the south (9th and 10th) were removed in connection with the construction of a new arsenal (Ny Tøjhus) in 1887-88. Another portion, with the 8th redan, disappeared as a result of the construction of Amager Boulevard in 1906-07. The rest of the southern portion (south of Torvegade) was converted into the public park Enveloppeparken in 1934-36.

The 6th redan was ceded to Copenhagen Municipality and opened to the public in 1961. The rest remained military area but became part of Freetown Christiania in 1971.

== Today ==
=== Dyssen ===
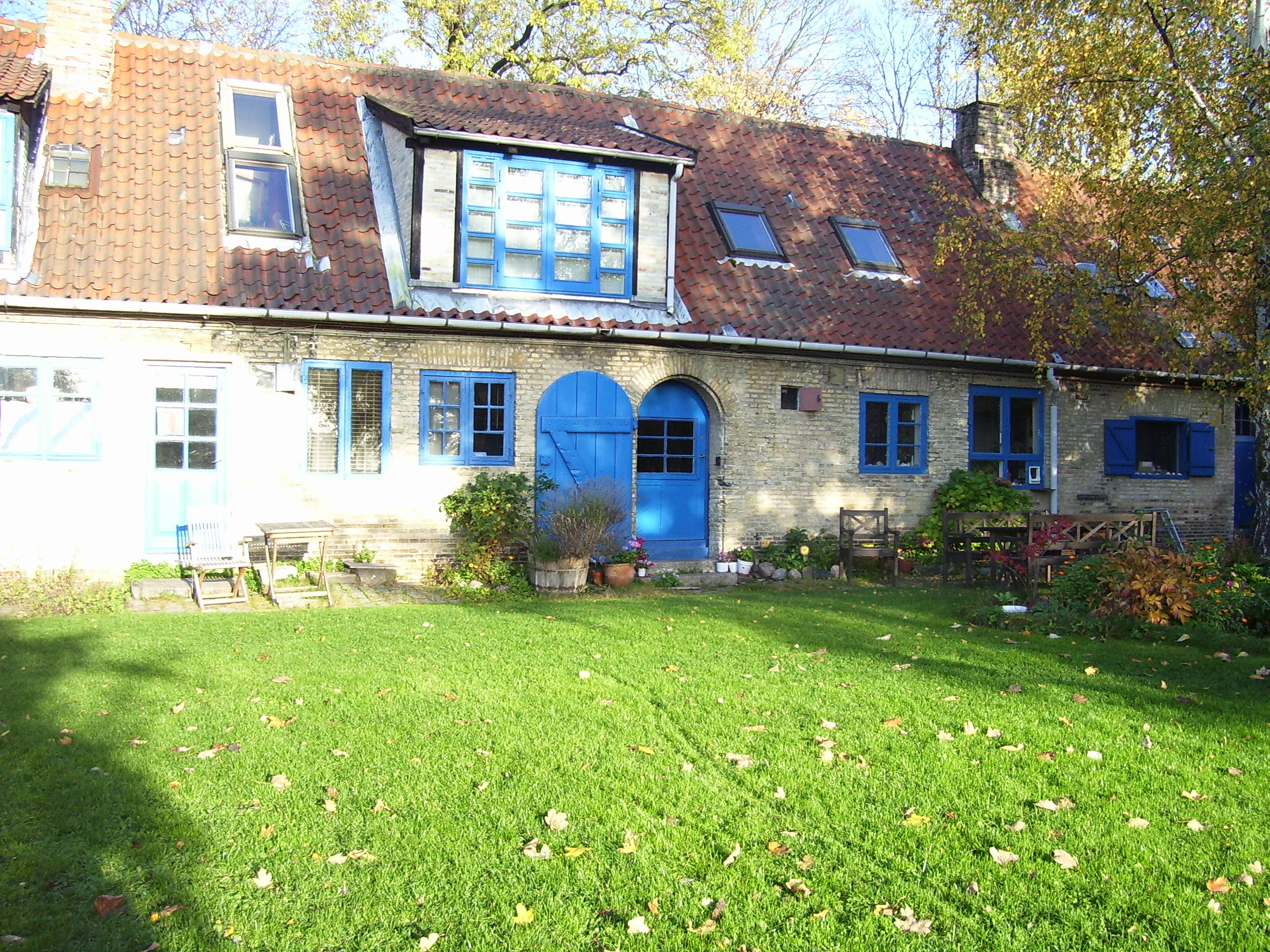
Former guardhouse at the 2nd Redan

Dyssen is still separated from the rest of Amager by the outer city moat (Ydre Stadsgrav) but connected to it at Torvegade in the south and just south of Refshalevej in the north. The area with the five northernmost redans are part of Freetown Christiania and known as Dyssem. The four gunpowder magazines are known as Aircondition (2. Redan, 1781), Autogena (3rd Redan, 1780), Fakirskolen (4th Redan, 1779)and Kosmiske Blomst (5. Redan, 1779).

=== Envolopeparken ===
The greenspace to the south of Torvegade is known as Envolopeparken. The path along the shore of Stadsgraven is called Enveloppevej. The park contains four monuments. Closest to Torvegade is a memorial to fallen members of the resistance movement during World War II. It was designed by Morten Nielsen and unveiled on 5 May 1949. It consists of a sculpture group with two people, one standing and one fallen, mounted on a tall plinth. Further south stands the Danish Aviators Memorial, commemoriating Danish aviators killed in service. It was created by Einar Utzon-Frank and inaugurated on 19 August 1938. It consists of a bronze composition of clouds, a giant eagle and four aeroplanes. Close to it stands a stone with an inscription commemorating Ulrik Birch who became the first Danish aviation casualty when he died in an aeroplane crash at nearby Kløvermarken on 1+ October 1913. The stone was designed by Georg Ulmer and installed in 1918. Close to the footbridge to the Panther's Bastion on the other side of Stadsgraven stands a sculpture by Mogens Bøggild of a cow getting up from the ground. It is from 1956.
