= Danish Aviators Memorial =

Monument in Copenhagen, Denmark

Coordinates: 55°40′05″N 12°35′31″E

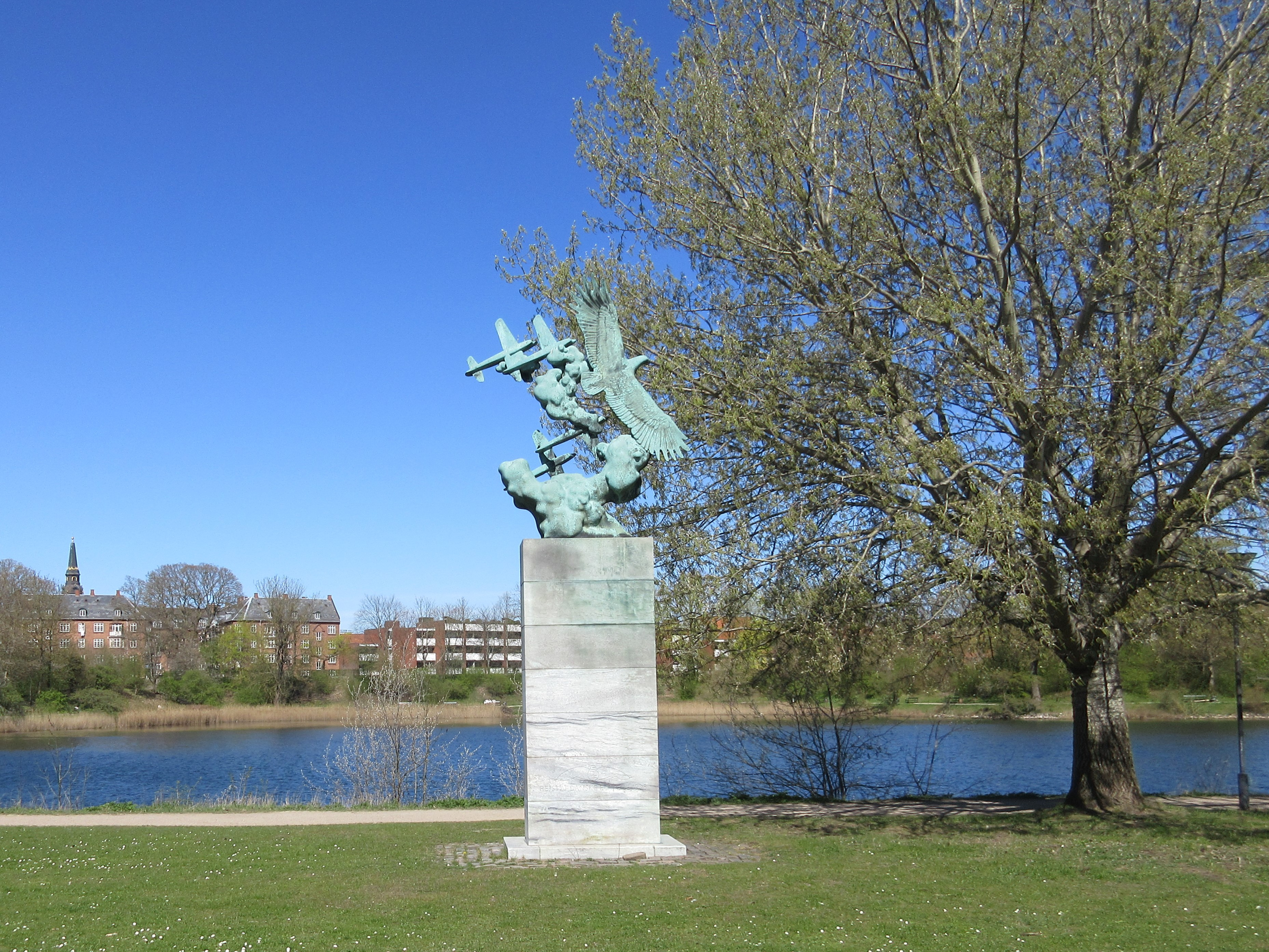
The monument in April 2026.

The Danish Aviators Memorial (Danish: Danske Flyveres Minde), situated in Enveloppeparken, close to Christmas Møllers Plads, Copenhagen, was erected in 1938 as a tribute to Danish aviators who were killed in duty. It was designed by Einar Utzon-Frank.

== History ==
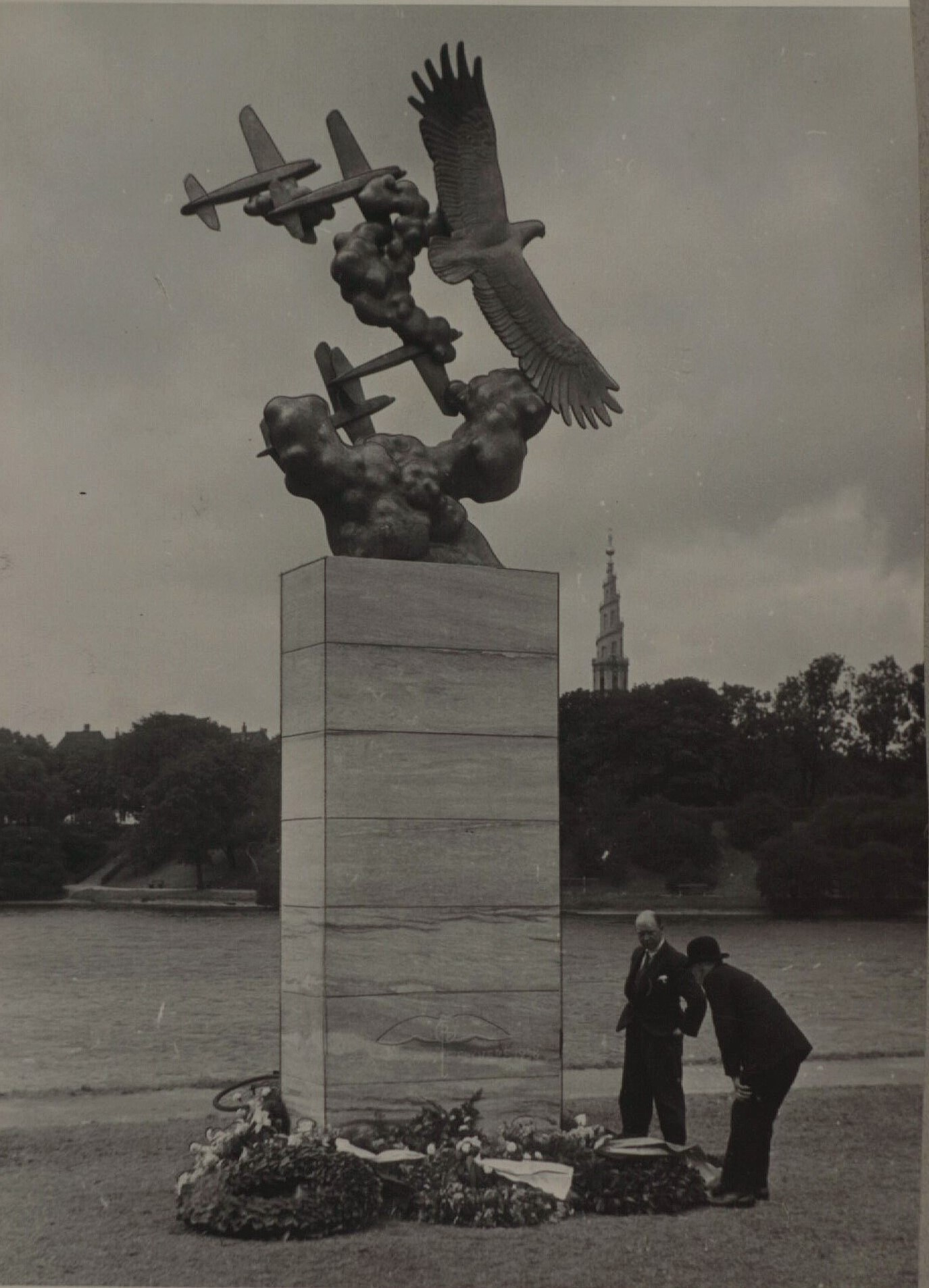
The inauguration of the memorial on 16 August 1938.

Some of the first Danish experiments with aviation took place at Kløvermarken. The first Danish aviator who was killed in an aircraft accident was Ulrik Birch. He crashed with his aircraft Ørnen on 10 October 1913 and died from his injuries a few days later. A memorial stone to Birch was erected by the Danish Aeronautical Society in Fælledparken in 1916. The stone was designed by sculptor Georg Ylmer.

The monument was created at the initiative of the Danish Association of Aviators. Einar Utzon-Frank was charged with designing the monument. It was unveiled on 19 August 1938.

The Ulrik Birch Memorial was moved to a site close to the Danish Aviators Memorial in 2007.

== Description ==
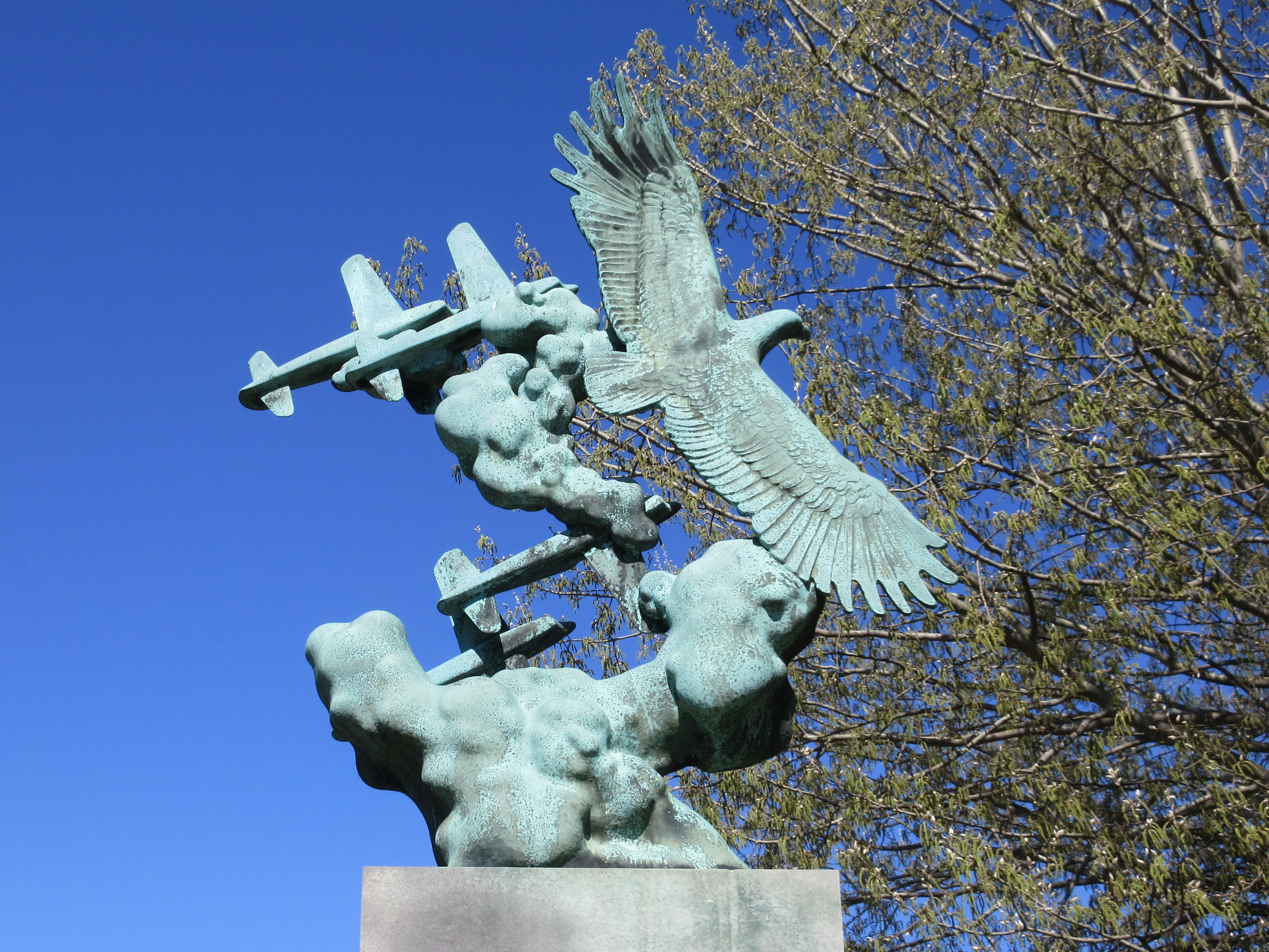
The bronze sculpture.

The monument consists of a bronze sculpture mounted on a tall plinth. The bronze sculpture depicts a gigantic eagle, four aeroplanes, and cloud formations. The latter are used to keep the other elements together.
