= Barney Djordjevic =

American soccer player (1942–2000)

Personal information
- Full name: Slobodan Đorđević
- Date of birth: 2 July 1942
- Place of birth: Niš, Yugoslavia
- Date of death: 16 August 2000 (aged 58)
- Place of death: New York, United States
- Position: Forward

International career
Years	Team	Apps	(Gls)
1972	United States	1	(0)

Slobodan "Barney" Djordjevic (July 2, 1942 – August 16, 2000) was an American soccer forward who earned one cap with the U.S. national team in a 2–1 World Cup qualification loss to Mexico on September 10, 1972, in Los Angeles. During the 1967–68 season, Djordjevic played for the New York club Inter S.C. in the American Soccer League. He also played for New York Inter-Giuliana in the German American Soccer League, and for New York Greeks in 1971 and 1972.

On September 10, 1972, in what was the final match of qualifying for the 1974 World Cup, an error by the United States Soccer Federation and a number of injuries left manager Bob Kehoe, who had been hired on a short-term basis, with only ten field players at his disposal. Two players, Fred Kovacs and Dieter Ficken, a German-American from New York, were flown in at the last minute and arrived at the stadium just two hours before kickoff. This left them one player short. It was Ficken who spotted fellow New York player Djordjevic in the nearly empty stands. Djordjevic, who had come to watch the match as a supporter, was subsequently selected as a player, received his kit, and signed the necessary paperwork to participate. Kehoe then played him as a left winger for half the match before substituting him for Johnny Moore, who would not make his professional debut until two years later.

In 2021, Brazilian writer Max Gehringer suggested that Djordjevic was probably tipped off before the match about the shortage of players, and that he showed up specifically so that he would be drafted.
