= Hazel Moore =

Mergers, acquisitions and venture capital specialist

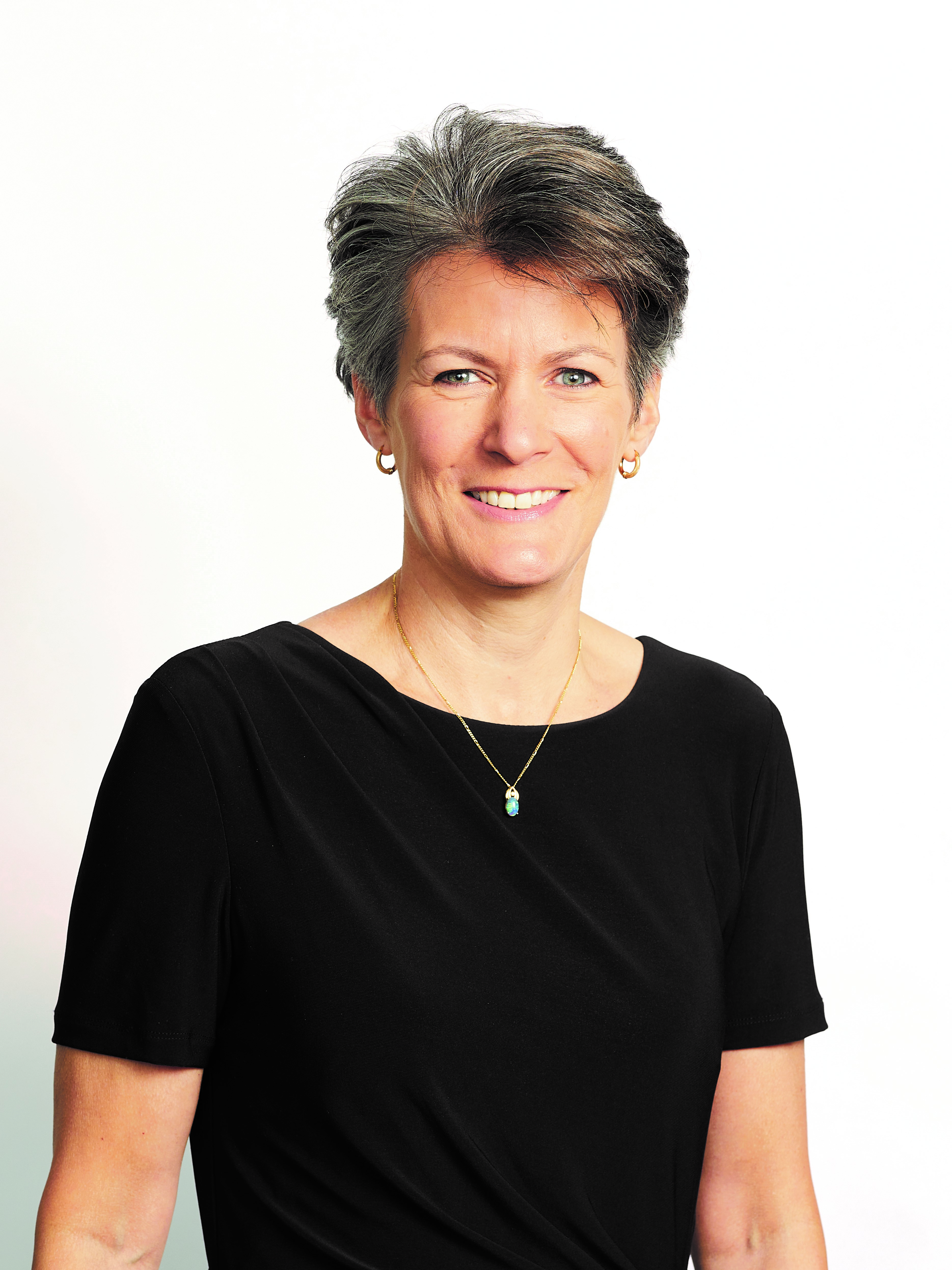
Hazel Moore OBE

Hazel Moore OBE is an English businesswoman, with a specialty in mergers and acquisitions and venture capital. Moore is the co-founder and chairman of FirstCapital, an investment bank which provides mergers and acquisitions, private equity and growth capital advice to high growth technology companies.

== Career ==
Moore studied Natural Sciences at Corpus Christi College, University of Cambridge, graduating in 1990. After a short period working as an engineer for GEC Marconi, Moore went to Hong Kong and joined WI Carr as an equity analyst.

This trip motivated Moore to set up her own business. Returning to the UK in 1995, Moore went on to co-found FirstCapital in 1999 with current CEO Jason Purcell.

From 2012-2018 Moore was a Governing Board member of Innovate UK; the UK's national innovation agency.

In June 2019 Moore was appointed as a non-executive director to the Board of British Patient Capital; a £2.5bn fund of funds investing in venture and growth capital funds. Moore stepped down from this role in 2025.

In May 2025, Moore was appointed a non-executive director of BBB Investment Services Ltd, a new business within the British Business Bank set up to offer investment services to clients, regulated by the Financial Conduct Authority. BBBSIL will establish the British Growth Partnership, encouraging UK pension fund and other institutional investment into the UK’s fastest growing, most innovative companies.

She has also been involved in he North West Fund amongst other initiatives.

== Awards ==
Moore received an OBE in the 2017 New Year's Honours list for services to Entrepreneurship and Innovation. She was given her OBE by Prince Charles at Buckingham Palace on 17 February 2017.

Moore was named as one of the most influential women in mid-market M&A by Mergers and Acquisitions in February 2019.

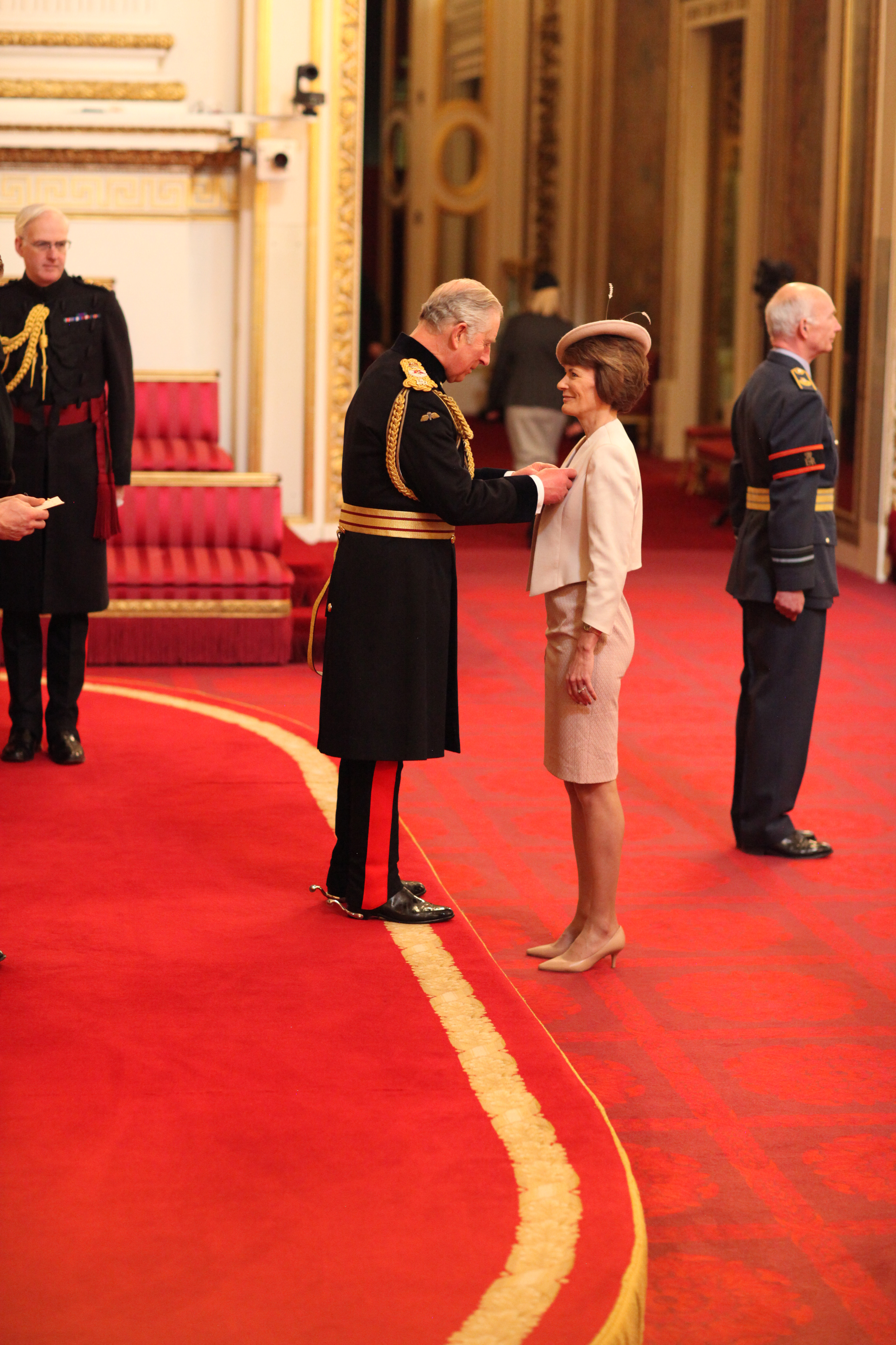
Hazel Moore receiving her OBE from Prince Charles
