= Wojciech Żukrowski =

Polish writer (1916–2000)

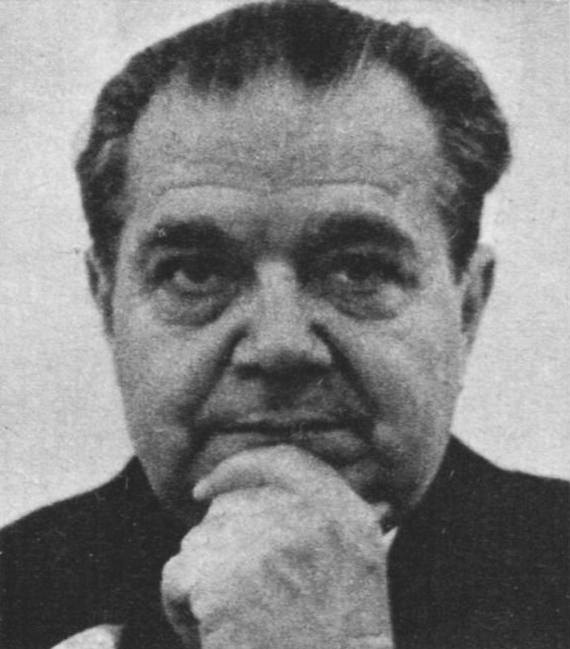
Wojciech Żukrowski

Wojciech Żukrowski (14 April 1916 in Kraków – 26 August 2000 in Warsaw) was a Polish prosaist, poet, reporter, essayist and literary critic.

== Life ==
In 1936, Żukrowski graduated from High School Zana in Pruszkow. In the same year he made his writing debut in a youth magazine, Kuźnia Młodych. After basic military training, in 1937, he matriculated at Jagiellonian University. He began his studies at the Faculty of Law in accordance with the wishes of his father, a lawyer and economist. However, in 1938, he transferred his studies to the Faculty of Humanities, studying Polish philology.

At the outbreak of World War II, he joined the Polish Army horse artillery. He was wounded in his right leg.

Stephanie Kraft, who translated his novel, Kamienne tablice (Stone Tablets), to English wrote that during the German occupation of Poland in World War II, Żukrowski worked at the Solvay limestone quarry alongside Karol Józef Wojtyła, who became Pope John Paul II. The quarry was not watched closely by the Germans and was a refuge for Polish intellectuals. The two were part of an underground acting group called the Rhapsodic Theatre. They continued to correspond by letter until Żukrowski's death in 2000.

He was after the war an officer in the People's Army and 1953/54 Front correspondent in Vietnam. From 1956 to 1959 he was in the diplomatic service in India. Żukrowski was also a Sejm deputy.

He wrote novels, short stories, children's books, stories and film scenarios which have been translated into numerous languages. His debut Żukrowski 1943 with the work Rdza.

At the request of the children, he received the international award as a Knight of the Order of the Smile.

He completed Stone Tablets in 1965. The Polish censors initially blocked its publication, but their decision was overturned in person by Poland's head of state, Władysław Gomułka. The book was published in Poland in 1966. The public reaction to the book's criticisms of Stalinist abuses and its conceptual sympathy with the Hungarian Revolution of 1956 led to problems with its subsequent print runs. Permission for a film version was refused in 1966 but eventually a film version was made in 1984.

In 1970, Czechoslovak government intervention prohibited public distribution of the first Czech translation print run. When the ban was lifted, the warehouse had already been emptied as the warehouse workers had smuggled the books out to readers.

Żukrowski won the Reymont Prize for lifetime literary achievement in 1996. He died in 2000. He had written 44 books and won 20 literary awards.

The English translation of Kamienne tablice (Stone Tablets) was released in 2016.

== Works ==
- Rdza (1943)
- Bal w agreście (1944)
- Porwanie w Tiutiurlistanie (1946)
- Z kraju milczenia (1946)
- Piórkiem flaminga czyli opowiadania przewrotne (1947)
- Ręka ojca (1948)
- Wiersze (1948)
- Mądre zioła (1951)
- Córeczka (1952)
- Szabla Gabrysia (1952)
- Słoneczne lato (1952)
- Dni klęski (1952)
- Poszukiwacze skarbów (1953)
- W kamieniołomie i inne opowiadania (1954)
- Dom bez ścian. Dziennik pobytu w Wietnamie (1954)
- Ognisko w dżungli. Opowieści i baśnie z Wietnamu (1955)
- Desant na Kamiennej Wyspie (1955)
- Wybór opowiadań (1956)
- Mój przyjaciel słoń (1957)
- Kantata (1957)
- Opowieści z dreszczykiem (1957)
- Okruchy weselnego tortu (1958)
- Wędrówki z moim Guru (1960)
- Skąpani w ogniu (1961)
- W królestwie miliona słoni (1961)
- Nieśmiały narzeczony (1964)
- Opowieści z Dalekiego Wschodu (1965)
- Kamienne tablice (1966); English translation "Stone Tablets" (2016),
- Szczęściarz (1967)
- Noce Ariadny (1968)
- Lotna (1969)
- Kierunek Berlin (1970)
- Wybór opowiadań (1972)
- Karambole (1973)
- W głębi zwierciadła. Gawędy o pisarzach i książkach (1973)
- Plaża nad Styksem (1976)
- Ostrożnie ze Złotym Lisem (1978)
- Białe zaproszenie i inne opowiadania (1979)
- Zapach psiej sierści (1980)
- Opowiadania z czasu wojny (1983)
- Na tronie w Blabonie (1986)
- Kamienny pies. Baśnie wietnamskie (1989)
- Rozmowy o książkach (1989)
- Czarci tuzin (compilation of series published in 2000)
