= Douglas Robertson Bisset =

Scottish sculptor (1908–2000)

- Born: 25 May 1908; Strichen, Aberdeenshire
- Died: 30 August 2000 (aged 92); Callander, Stirlingshire
- Known for: Painting, sculpture

Douglas Robertson Bisset (25 May 1908 – 30 August 2000), was a Scottish sculptor, best known for his works in the city of Glasgow and for several notable portrait busts.

== Biography ==
Bisset was born in Strichen in Aberdeenshire and served an apprenticeship with an architectural sculptor in Glasgow before studying at the Glasgow School of Art between 1930 and 1933. Bisset won the Newberry Gold Medal and a John Keppie Scholarship, which allowed him to travel to Germany, Austria and Denmark to further his studies. During 1933 he worked as an assistant teacher at the Royal Danish Academy of Fine Arts under Einar Utzon-Frank. Bisset then spent two years at the British School at Rome before moving to Greece in 1935 where he was attached to the British School of Archaeology in Athens for three years.

Bisset contributed plaster statues, now lost, of David Livingstone and James Watt for the Scottish Pavilion North which was part of the Empire Exhibition held in Glasgow in 1938. Many years later, he produced a relief panel, with an unusual take on the idea of the Grim Reaper, which was sited above the mortuary door of the Glasgow Victoria Infirmary.

Bisset returned to Britain at the start of World War Two and settled in London. During 1939 he taught art and sculpture at the Brighton School of Art and later in 1939 took the post of Head of Sculpture at Leeds College of Art where he remained until 1946. In 1944, the War Artists' Advisory Committee purchased a bronze bust by Bisset of the Victoria Cross holder John Patrick Kenneally. Bisset's 1950 portrait bust of Ernest Bevin is now in the British Government's Art Collection.

From 1980 until 1995, Bisset lived in Mexico but eventually returned to live in Glasgow.
