= Sergei Brushko =

Sergei (or Siarhei) Brushko, Сергей Брушко (рус.) (1958–2000) was a Belarusian photographer.

Siarhei Brushko was born on 28 May 1958 in the town of Haradzieja, near Niasviž, Minsk Region.

After receiving his first camera as a birthday gift at age 6, Siarhei Brushko dedicated his entire life to photography. In his youth, Brushko earned extra money by shooting village holidays, and with the money he bought chemicals for photography and rare Czech photo magazines, for which he travelled to Lithuania.

After graduating from school, he decided to study geography at the Belarusian State University, but was one point below the passing score at the entrance exams. Brushko returned to photography, when, after the army, he went to be trained as a photography technologist at a vocational school in Maladziečna. After leaving it, he was assigned to a job as a studio photographer in Salihorsk. However, Brushko immediately tried to find a freer and more promising job and was soon noticed as a freelance author, first with a local newspaper, and later with the nationwide newspaper Čyrvonaja Zmiena. On the wave of glasnost and the emergence of the national democratic movement, the Belarusian-language outlet constantly raised acute social and political topics. This could not affect the works of Siarhei Brushko, as his photos became expressly social, while the Soviet-style realism disappeared from his works and art photography retreated to the background.

At this time, Brushko began working on the theme of the Chernobyl tragedy, and the topic eventually became the author’s calling. Since his first trips to the relocation zone in 1987, later to the oncology centre and up to the last trip two months before his death, the topic echoed in the society. It was the social tragedy after the explosion that formed the basis of the photographer’s works. Almost without touching the exclusion zone and environmental aspects, Siarhei Brushko talked about the tragedy of innocent people who were simply expelled from their land as a result of a man-made disaster and the recklessness of people. The themes of meetings and partings, wandering without a native land, pain and illness were all stocked for a dozen years to be eventually told through photographs.

During those years, Brushko published a number of reports, most notably about a women’s prison, street children, and the extinction of villages. The theme of country life also became one of the author’s work dominants.

The active period lasted about 10 years. In the mid-90s, the photographer was diagnosed with incurable Raynaud’s syndrome. It was during this time that his only book was published, Brushko’s co-project with the Swiss photographer Hugo Jaeggi “Die Hoffnung stirbt zuletzt: Belarus im Jahre Zwölf nach Tschernobyl” (1998).

In the last 2 years of his life, the photographer struggled with the disease, spending most of his time in the hospital.

Siarhei Brushko died on 28 August 2000 and was buried in his native town of Haradzieja.
