= Renato Dionisi (composer) =

Italian composer

Renato Dionisi (2 January 1910 in Rovinj – 24 August 2000 in Verona) was an Italian composer and music educator.

== Biography ==
Renato Dionisi was born in Rovinj in Istria, but soon moved to Borgo Sacco, Rovereto where he spent his childhood and early youth. He studied music composition at the music schools in Bolzano and Rovereto, graduating in 1936. From 1940 he taught music history, choral music, harmony and counterpoint at several schools including the Bolzano Conservatory, Milan Conservatory and the Conservatory "Luigi Cherubini" in Florence.

== Selected works ==
Dionisi's scores are largely published by Casa Ricordi, Edizioni Suvini Zerboni, Edizioni Musicali G. Zanibon and Edizioni Bèrben.

Orchestral

- Aldebaran for flute, oboe, trumpet, harp, string orchestra and percussion (1981)
- Luctus in ludis for narrator and chamber orchestra (1971)
- Sonatina per orchestra e pianoforte a quattro mani (1982)

Concertante

- Tre movimenti (3 Movements) for viola and string orchestra (1966)
- Concerto for 2 pianos and string orchestra (1968)
- Musica for timpani and chamber orchestra

Chamber music

- Quartetto a fiati (Wind Quartet) for flute, oboe, clarinet and bassoon (1958)
- Divertimento per sei strumenti (Divertimento for Six Instruments) for flute, oboe, clarinet, horn, bassoon and piano (1966)
- Piccole composizioni per strumenti a fiato (Little Compositions for Wind Instruments), 19 Small Pieces for flute, oboe, clarinet, bassoon in various combinations (1970)
- Melismi for guitar and 4 instruments (flute, clarinet, viola, cello) (1971)
- Dialogo for trumpet and organ (1972)
- Tredici piccole composizioni (13 Little Compositions) for violin and piano (1973)
- Fantasia for 2 trumpets, 2 trombones and organ (1976)
- Piccole composizioni (Little Compositions), 9 Pieces (set 1) for 2 cellos (1980)
- Piccole composizioni (Little Compositions), 9 Pieces (set 2) for cello and piano (1980)
- Sonatina for viola and piano (1983)
- Due pezzi (2 Pieces) for clarinet solo

Organ

- Tre contrappunti (1966)

Piano

- 15 piccole composizioni per pianisti piccoli (15 Little Compositions for Little Pianists) (1959)
- Movimenti (1966)
- Suoni e risonanze (1971)

Vocal

- Due canti sacri for voice, clarinet and piano (1968)
