= Betty Blue (model) =

American model and actress

Playboy centerfold appearance
- November 1956
- Preceded by: Janet Pilgrim
- Succeeded by: Lisa Winters

Personal details
- Born: August 14, 1931 West Memphis, Arkansas, U.S.
- Died: August 23, 2000 (aged 69)
- Height: 5 ft 3 in (1.60 m)

Betty Blue (August 14, 1931 – August 23, 2000) was an American model and actress and was Playboy magazine's Playmate of the Month for the November 1956 issue. Her centerfold was photographed by Hal Adams.

A self-described nudist, Blue was a showgirl at the El Rancho Hotel and Casino in Las Vegas before becoming a Playmate, and posed for other men's magazines before and after joining the Playboy family. She also did additional nude photo shoots for Playboy, usually anonymously, and can be seen in a mid-1990s topless shot in The Playmate Book.

Blue had a limited acting career, mostly in TV commercials and some B-movies.

From 1957 to 1963, Blue was married to producer and director Harold Lime. They remarried in 1991.

Upon her death from heart failure, her ashes were sprinkled on the grounds of the Playboy Mansion.

== Filmography ==
- Women in Revolt (1971) (as Baby Betty) .... Betty
- Not Tonight Henry (1961) .... Pocahontas

== See also ==
- List of people in Playboy 1953–1959

Lynn Turner	Marguerite Empey	Marian Stafford	Rusty Fisher	Marion Scott	Gloria Walker
Alice Denham	Jonnie Nicely	Elsa Sørensen	Janet Pilgrim	Betty Blue	Lisa Winters
