= Cheng Wu-fei =

Chinese painter

- 費成武
- Born: 30 December 1911
- Died: 24 August 2000 (aged 88); Barnet, England
- Resting place: Kenwood House
- Education: Nanjing University Slade School of Art
- Occupation: Painter
- Spouse: Chien-Ying Chang

Cheng Wu-fei (Mandarin Chinese: 費成武; 30 December 1911 – 24 August 2000) was a Chinese painter

== Biography ==
Born in 1911, Chen Wu-fei was a student of Xu Beihong at the Department of Fine Arts of the National Central University of Nanjing where he met his future wife Chang Chien-ying, both would win British Council grants to study overseas in Britain, where they enrolled in the Slade School of Art from 1947 to 1950

Chen, participated in the painting event in the art competition at the 1948 Summer Olympics.

Chen was married to Chang Chien-ying in 1953. Following the rise of the Chinese Communist Party, the couple opted to permanently stay in London. Much of his later life was dedicated to an academic career.
