= Deaths in July 2000 =

The following is a list of notable deaths in July 2000.

Entries for each day are listed alphabetically by surname. A typical entry lists information in the following sequence:

- Name, age, country of citizenship at birth, subsequent country of citizenship (if applicable), reason for notability, cause of death (if known), and reference.

== July 2000 ==
=== 1 ===
- Lucie Blackman, 21, English bar hostess, murdered.
- Burt Douglas, 69, American film, stage and television actor.
- Raymond Robert Forster, 78, New Zealand arachnologist and museum director.
- John Albert Axel Gibson, 83, British flying ace during World War II.
- Irene Hirst, 69, British Olympic gymanst (1948, 1952).
- Steve Hokuf, 89, American football player (Boston Redskins), and coach, stroke.
- Begum Om Habibeh Aga Khan, 94, fourth wife of Sir Sultan Muhammad Shah.
- Cub Koda, 51, American rock and roll musician and record compiler, kidney failure.
- Ganju Lama, 75, Sikkimese Gurkha and recipient of the Victoria Cross, cancer.
- Walter Matthau, 79, American actor (The Odd Couple, The Fortune Cookie, The Sunshine Boys), Oscar winner (1967), heart attack.
- Pierre Petit, 78, French composer.

=== 2 ===
- Mina Aoe, 59, Japanese female enka singer, pancreatic cancer.
- Joey Dunlop, 48, Northern Irish motorcycle racer, traffic collision.
- Constance Howard, 89, English textile artist and embroiderer.
- Paul McLaughlin, 80, Canadian sailor and Olympian (1948, 1952).
- Karl Sweetan, 57, American gridiron football player (Detroit Lions, New Orleans Saints, Los Angeles Rams), complications following surgery.
- Georgi Tringov, 63, Bulgarian chess grandmaster.

=== 3 ===
- Vivian Bullwinkel, 84, Australian nurse, heart attack.
- Walter Cassel, 90, American operatic baritone and actor.
- Nancy Cato, 83, Australian writer and poet.
- Samuel Chandanappally, 60, Indian writer, college professor and orator.
- Eddie Craddock, 72, Australian rules footballer.
- James Grogan, 68, American figure skater and Olympian (1948, 1952), multiple organ failure.
- André Guinier, 88, French physicist.
- Michael Hamilton, 81, British politician.
- Paul G. Hatfield, 72, American attorney and politician, member of the U.S. Senate (1978).
- John Hejduk, 70, Czech-American architect, artist and educator.
- Leonard Hilton, 52, American long-distance runner and Olympian (1972), pancreatic cancer.
- János Kamara, 73, Hungarian communist politician.
- Enric Miralles, 45, Spanish architect, brain tumor.
- Harold Nicholas, 79, American dancer (Nicholas Brothers), heart attack.
- Fiorentino Sullo, 79, Italian politician, complications from diabetes.
- Kemal Sunal, 55, Turkish actor, heart attack aboard a flight.

=== 4 ===
- Donald Blessing, 94, American rower and Olympic champion (1928).
- Jack T. Bradley, 82, US Army Air Force fighter ace during World War II.
- Chuck Briggs, 40, American guitarist, HIV.
- Chiquet Mawet, 63, Belgian poet.
- Allan Fakir, 68, Pakistani folk singer.
- Gustaw Herling-Grudziński, 81, Polish writer and political dissident, stroke.
- Halil Kaya, 79-80, Turkish Olympic wrestler (1948).
- Yuri Klinskikh, 35, Russian singer, songwriter and arranger, heart failure.
- Marina Kroschina, 47, Ukrainian tennis player, suicide.
- Philip Lever, 3rd Viscount Leverhulme, 85, British aristocrat.
- Vladimír Ráž, 77, Czechoslovak film actor.
- Shōji Ueda, 87, Japanese photographer, heart attack.

=== 5 ===
- Syed Abdus Sobhan, 67, Bangladeshi lawyer and politician.
- Blanca Álvarez Mantilla, 68, Spanish journalist, cancer.
- Mary Nicol Neill Armour, 98, Scottish painter.
- Franta Belsky, 79, Czech sculptor, prostate cancer.
- Giovanni Bettinelli, 65, Italian racing cyclist.
- Edgar Cardoso, 87, Portuguese civil engineer and university professor.
- Yodelin' Slim Clark, 82, American musician.
- Leon deValinger Jr., 95, American archivist and historian.
- Mehrangiz Manoochehrian, 94, Iranian lawyer, musician and feminist.
- Peter Bullfrog Moore, 68, Australian rugby league administrator, esophageal cancer.
- Dorino Serafini, 90, Italian motorcycle road racer and racing driver.
- Gloria Williams, 57, American singer, diabetes.
- Jos Wohlfart, 80, Luxembourgish politician.
- Lord Woodbine, 71, Trinidadian calypsonian and music promoter, house fire.

=== 6 ===
- Alix André, 91, French novelist.
- Miervaldis Birze, 79, Latvian writer, publicist, and physician.
- Roderic Coote, 85, British Anglican prelate.
- Eric Fraser, 69, English rugby player.
- Lazar Koliševski, 86, Yugoslav communist political leader.
- Fred Lane, 24, American football player (Carolina Panthers), shot.
- Akira Miyazawa, 72, Japanese jazz saxophonist, clarinetist, and flautist.
- Ľudovít Rajter, 93, Slovak composer and conductor.
- Władysław Szpilman, 88, Jewish-Polish pianist and Holocaust survivor portrayed in the 2002 film The Pianist, natural causes.
- Marcella Comès Winslow, 95, American photographer and portrait painter.

=== 7 ===
- István Bodor, 73, Hungarian canoeist and Olympian (1952).
- Jim Brown, 90, Canadian sprinter and Olympian (1932), complications from a broken hip.
- Dame Stella Casey, 76, New Zealand social activist.
- Kenny Irwin, 30, American stock car racing driver, racing accident.
- Charles Johnson, 87, British Olympic diver (1948).
- Achim Krause-Wichmann, 70, German Olympic rower (1952).
- Ursula Kuczynski, 93, German communist activist and spy.
- James C. Quayle, 79, American newspaper publisher.
- William J. Randall, 90, American politician, member of the United States House of Representatives (1959-1977).
- Johann Urbanek, 89, Austrian football player.
- Charles Alan Wright, 72, American constitutional lawyer, complications following lung surgery.
- Dmitry Alexandrovich Zavadsky, 27, Belarusian journalist, homicide.

=== 8 ===
- FM-2030, 69, Iranian-American author, transhumanist philosopher, futurist and Olympian (1948), pancreatic cancer.
- Patricia Carpenter, 77, American music theorist.
- Pieter Goemans, 75, Dutch composer ("Aan de Amsterdamse grachten").
- Judit Kéri-Novák, 50, Hungarian Olympic rower (1976, 1980).
- Anne Mueller, 69, British civil servant and academic, Parkinson's disease.
- Maurice Owen, 76, English footballer.
- Cliff Sear, 63, Welsh footballer, heart attack.

=== 9 ===
- Bianca Bianchi, 85, Italian teacher, socialist politician, feminist, and writer.
- Doug Fisher, 58, English actor, heart attack.
- Henri Gault, 70, French food journalist, heart attack.
- Herbert Hunger, 85, Austrian byzantinist.
- Erkki Koiso, 66, Finnish ice hockey player and Olympian (1960).
- John Morgan, 41, British etiquette expert, fall.
- Joe Sostilio, 85, American racing driver.
- John Vitale, 34, American football player, cancer.

=== 10 ===
- Gertrud Arndt, 96, German photographer and designer.
- Frank Berni, 96, Italian-born British restaurateur.
- Henri Bol, 55, Dutch painter.
- Denis O'Conor Don, 87, English noble and hereditary Chief of the Name O'Conor.
- Dick Glasser, 65, American singer, songwriter, and record producer, lung cancer.
- Vakkom Majeed, 90, Indian politician.
- Conrad McRae, 29, American basketball player, heart attack.
- Ursule Molinaro, French-American writer.
- Bill Munson, 58, American gridiron football player, drowned.
- Francisco Matos Paoli, 85, Puerto Rican poet, critic, and essayist.
- Justin Pierce, 25, British skateboarder and actor (Kids, Next Friday), suicide by hanging.
- Apostolos Vakalopoulos, 90, Greek historian.
- Norma Wilson, 90, New Zealand athlete and Olympian (1928).

=== 11 ===
- Begum Akbar Jehan Abdullah, 84, Indian politician.
- Bill Alexander, 90, British political activist.
- Dick Caldwell, 91, British admiral.
- Jaroslav Filip, 51, Slovak musician, composer, dramaturge, and actor, heart attack.
- Pedro Mir, 87, Dominican poet and writer (Poet Laureate), pulmonary illness.
- Robert Runcie, 78, British Archbishop of Canterbury, cancer.
- Barry Tabobondung, 39, Canadian ice hockey player, traffic collision.

=== 12 ===
- Merrill Bradshaw, 71, American composer and professor.
- Al Butler, 62, American basketball player (Boston Celtics, New York Knicks, Baltimore Bullets), cancer.
- Tom Galley, 84, English football player.
- Charles Merritt, 91, Canadian war hero and recipient of the Victoria Cross.
- Prince Tomislav of Yugoslavia, 72, Yugoslav prince.

=== 13 ===
- Matt Anthony, 79, Canadian football player, cancer.
- Harry Coe, 68, American attorney, suicide.
- A. D. Hope, 92, Australian poet.
- Dick Edgar Ibarra Grasso, 86, Argentine historian and researcher.
- Jan Karski, 86, Polish resistance fighter and academic, heart and kidney disease.
- Alice Lord, 98, American Olympic diver (1920).
- Mauno Rintanen, 75, Finnish football player, basketball player, and Olympian (1952).
- Indira Sant, 86, Marathi poet from Maharashtra, India.
- Fabio Santamaria, 74, Cuban Olympic wrestler (1948).

=== 14 ===
- Bill Barth, 57, American blues guitarist, heart attack.
- Finn-Egil Eckblad, 76, Norwegian mycologist.
- Alvin Hollingsworth, 72, American painter and comics artist.
- Luís Machado, 74, Portuguese Olympic rower (1948).
- Meredith MacRae, 56, American actress (My Three Sons, Petticoat Junction), complications of brain cancer.
- Georges Maranda, 68, Canadian baseball player (San Francisco Giants, Minnesota Twins), cancer.
- Mark Oliphant, 98, Australian physicist, Governor of South Australia.
- Pepo, 88, Chilean cartoonist.

=== 15 ===
- Emanuel Araújo, 57, Brazilian historian and editor.
- Paul Bühlmann, 73, Swiss comedian, radio personality, and actor.
- Johnny Duncan, 67, American bluegrass musician, cancer.
- Juan Filloy, 105, Argentine writer, natural causes.
- Jocko Henderson, 82, American radio disc jockey, and hip hop music pioneer, cancer and diabetes.
- Leo Hoegh, 92, U.S. Army officer, lawyer, and politician, Governor of Iowa (1955-1957).
- John O. Pastore, 93, American lawyer and politician, Governor of Rhode Island (1945-1950) and member of the U.S. Senate (1950-1976), kidney failure.
- Louis Quilico, 75, Canadian opera singer.
- Kalle Svensson, 74, Swedish footballer and Olympian (1948, 1952).
- Paul Young, 53, British singer and songwriter (Sad Café, Mike + The Mechanics), heart attack.

=== 16 ===
- Franciszek Adamczak, 73, Polish–Swedish palaeontologist.
- Fay Alexander, 75, American circus performer.
- Igor Domnikov, 41, Russian journalist and editor, bludgeoned with a hammer.
- György Petri, 56, Hungarian poet, laryngeal cancer.
- Barbosa Lima Sobrinho, 103, Brazilian lawyer, writer, journalist and politician.
- Jean Vercoutter, 89, French Egyptologist.
- Bernie Whitebear, 62, American Indian activist, colon cancer.
- William Foote Whyte, 86, American sociologist.

=== 17 ===
- Pascale Audret, 64, French actress, traffic collision.
- David Brooke-Taylor, 80, English cricketer.
- William R. Corson, 74, American author and soldier.
- Thomas Quinn Curtiss, 85, American writer, and film and theater critic.
- Brown Derby, 86, Scottish actor.
- Zhao Lirong, 72, Chinese singer and film actress, lung cancer.
- Hans-Hermann Magnussen, 74, German Olympic sailor (1952).
- Aligi Sassu, 88, Italian painter and sculptor.
- Jean Swain, 76, American singer.
- Berthe Villancher, 91, French gymnastics judge and official.

=== 18 ===
- Abdul Malek, 64, Bangladeshi politician.
- Ansuyabai Borkar, 70-71, Indian social activist.
- René Chocat, 79, French basketball player and Olympian (1948, 1952).
- Roberto Contreras, 71, American actor.
- Paul Coverdell, 61, American politician, member of the U.S. Senate from Georgia (since 1993), cerebral hemorrhage.
- Archie Craig, 88, Scottish racing cyclist.
- John F. Davis, 93, American lawyer and law professor.
- Enrique de Gandía, 94, Argentine historian and author.
- Francisco Javier Sáenz de Oíza, 81, Spanish architect, cancer.
- José Ángel Valente, 71, Spanish poet and essayist.

=== 19 ===
- James B. Clark, 92, American film and television director.
- Stephen Gendin, 34, American AIDS activist, AIDS-induced lymphoma.
- Kamala Das Gupta, 93, Indian freedom fighter.
- Hananiah Harari, 87, American painter and illustrator.
- Alfred Knight, 82, British Olympic weightlifter (1948).
- Owen Maddock, 74, British engineer and racing car designer.
- Carlos Monteverde, 80, Venezuelan Olympic sports shooter (1952, 1956, 1960).
- Tommy O'Boyle, 82, American football coach.
- Allen Paulson, 78, American businessman, cancer.

=== 20 ===
- Tibor Bodor, 79, Hungarian actor.
- Justin Carmack, 19, American child actor, car accident.
- Mickey Colmer, 81, American football player (Brooklyn Dodgers, New York Yankees).
- Eyvind Earle, 84, American artist (Paul Bunyan, Lady and the Tramp, Sleeping Beauty), author and illustrator, esophageal cancer.
- Joseph F. Enright, 89, American submarine commander.
- József Gulrich, 58, Hungarian Olympic swimmer (1964).
- James Hobson Morrison, 91, American politician (member of the United States House of Representatives), heart attack.
- Béla Rajki, 91, Hungarian swimming coach and water polo coach.
- Murray G. Ross, 90, Canadian sociologist, author, and academic administrator.
- Mabel Scott, 85, American gospel music and R&B vocalist.
- Jim Suchecki, 72, American baseball player (Boston Red Sox, St. Louis Browns, Pittsburgh Pirates).
- Alexis P. Vlasto, 84, British historian and philologist.
- Malaclypse the Younger, 59, American author, cancer.

=== 21 ===
- Vladimir Bagirov, 63, Soviet-Latvian grandmaster of chess, chess author, and trainer, heart attack.
- Tony DeBlase, 58, American author, liver failure.
- Constanze Engelbrecht, 50, German actress, breast cancer.
- Iain Hamilton, 78, Scottish composer.
- Maria Kleschar-Samokhvalova, 84, Soviet Russian painter and graphic artist.
- Frank Miller, 73, Canadian politician, Premier of Ontario.
- Vladimir Novikov, 92, Soviet-Russian politician and statesman.
- Eddie Pequenino, 72, Argentine film actor.
- Yosef Qafih, 82, Yemenite-Israeli zionist orthodox rabbi.
- Oliver Henry Radkey, 91, American historian of Russian and Soviet history.
- Stanojlo Rajičić, 89, Serbian composer and musicologist.
- Marc Reisner, 51, American environmentalist and writer, colon cancer.
- Josef Šenkýř, 44, Czech Olympic sailor (1980), traffic collision.
- Åke Senning, 84, Swedish cardiac surgeon.
- Yoshio Watanabe, 93, Japanese photographer.

=== 22 ===
- John Butterfield, Baron Butterfield, 80, British medical researcher and academic administrator.
- Eric Christmas, 84, British actor (Porky's, Days of Our Lives, Air Bud), natural causes.
- Alexander Dallin, 76, American historian and political scientist, heart failure.
- Raymond Lemieux, 80, Canadian organic chemist, aneurysm.
- Staffan Burenstam Linder, 68, Swedish economist and politician, lung cancer.
- Claude Sautet, 76, French film director and screenwriter, liver cancer.
- Archie W. Straiton, 92, American physicist.
- Teleco, 86, Brazilian football player.
- Yusuf Tunaoğlu, 54, Turkish footballer, cardiac arrest.
- Howie Yeager, 85, American football player (New York Giants).

=== 23 ===
- Basil Acres, 73, English footballer.
- Ralph Evans, 76, American competitive sailor and Olympic medalist (1948).
- Carmen Martín Gaite, 74, Spanish author.
- Oiva Lommi, 78, Finnish Olympic rower (1948, 1952).
- Vittorio Mangano, 59, Italian mobster, cancer.
- Kao Pao-shu, 61, Chinese actress, producer, writer and film director.
- Mars Rafikov, 66, Soviet cosmonaut.
- Ahmad Shamloo, 74, Iranian poet, writer and journalist.
- Rolf Storm, 69, Swedish Olympic boxer (1952).

=== 24 ===
- Ignacio Alfaro Arregui, 82, Spanish military officer.
- Alvin L. Alm, 63, American politician, heart failure.
- George Bailey, 94, British athlete and Olympian (1932).
- Anatoli Firsov, 59, Russian ice hockey player and Olympian (1964, 1968, 1972), heart attack.
- Pierre Hardy, 92, French sport shooter and Olympic medalist (1924).
- Jim Kremer, 81, Luxembourgish football player and Olympian (1948).
- Dharmasiri Senanayake, 67, Sri Lankan politician.
- Oscar Shumsky, 83, American violinist and conductor.
- G. Wood, 80, American actor (M*A*S*H, Harold and Maude, Brewster McCloud), congestive heart failure.

=== 25 ===
- Eva Braak, 60, German anatomist, ovarian cancer.
- Julia Pirotte, 92, Polish photojournalist.
- Aleksander Rokosa, 64, Polish Olympic gymnast (1960, 1964, 1968).
- Fred C. Sheffey, 71, United States Army major general, lung cancer.
- Elizabeth Wilson, 86, American screenwriter and playwright.
- Notable people killed in the crash of Air France Flight 4590:
  - Rudi Faßnacht, 65, German football manager.
  - Christian Götz, 60, German trade unionist and politician.
  - Christian Marty, 54, French windsurfer and captain of Flight 4590.

=== 26 ===
- Abhayadev, 87, Indian poet and lyricist.
- Ludwig Bielenberg, 70, German Olympic sailor (1952, 1956).
- U. R. Jeevarathinam, Tamil actress, singer and producer.
- Dalkhan Khozhaev, 39, Chechen historian, field commander, brigadier general and author, shot by a sniper.
- John Tukey, 85, American mathematician.
- Don Weis, 78, American film and television director.

=== 27 ===
- Virginia Admiral, 85, American painter and poet.
- Earl Craven, 77, American football and basketball coach and college athletics administrator.
- Albert van Dantzig, 63, Dutch historian, Alzheimer's disease.
- Bruce Douglas-Mann, 73, British politician.
- Val Dufour, 73, American actor, cancer.
- Paddy Joyce, 77, British actor, stroke.
- Vladimir Lisunov, 60, Russian nonconformist artist, murdered.
- Constance Stuart Larrabee, 85, English photographer and war correspondent.
- Gordon Solie, 71, American wrestling commentator, throat cancer.

=== 28 ===
- Jaime Cardriche, 32, American actor (Malcolm & Eddie, House Party, Deep Cover), complications during gall bladder surgery.
- Margaret Chapman, 59, English illustrator and painter.
- Depé, 28, French association football supporter.
- Leslie Martin, 91, English architect.
- Abraham Pais, 82, Dutch-American physicist, cardiovascular disease.
- Jonas M. Platt, 80, United States Marine Corps officer, heart and lung ailments.
- Jerome Smith, 47, American guitarist (KC and the Sunshine Band), bulldozing accident.
- Chic Stone, 77, American comic book artist (Fantastic Four).
- John Wells, 93, British artist.

=== 29 ===
- Kobie Coetsee, 69, South African lawyer and politician, heart attack.
- Eladio Dieste, 82, Uruguayan engineer.
- René Gerónimo Favaloro, 77, Argentine cardiologist, suicide by gunshot.
- Benny Fenton, 81, English football player and manager.
- Åke Hodell, 81, Swedish fighter pilot, poet, author, text-sound composer, and artist.
- Richard Kerry, 85, American Foreign Service officer and lawyer, prostate cancer.
- Bobby Reid, 63, Scottish football player.
- Bob Welch, 72, Canadian politician.

=== 30 ===
- Örjan Blomquist, 42, Swedish cross-country skier, cancer.
- Ab Box, 91, Canadian football player.
- Staff Barootes, 81, Canadian politician, member of the Senate of Canada (1984-1993).
- Jim Clark, 71, American gridiron football player (Washington Redskins).
- Derek Hill, 83, English portrait and landscape painter.
- Nan Leslie, 74, American actress, pneumonia.
- Max Showalter, 83, American actor (Niagara, Sixteen Candles, 10), cancer.
- Jack Smiley, 77, American basketball player.

=== 31 ===
- István Gulyás, 68, Hungarian tennis player.
- Lars Jansson, 73, Finnish author and cartoonist.
- William Keepers Maxwell, Jr., 91, American novelist, short story writer, essayist and children's author.
- Constance Babington Smith, 87, British journalist and writer.
- Armando Trindade, 72, Pakistani prelate of the Roman Catholic Church.
- Hendrik C. van de Hulst, 81, Dutch astronomer and mathematician.
- Thomas Wolff, 46, American mathematician, traffic collision.
