= Archibald Craig =

Archibald Craig may refer to:

- Archibald Craig (fencer) (1887–1960), British fencer
- Archibald Campbell Craig (1888–1985), Scottish minister and biblical scholar
- Archie Craig (1912–2000), Scottish racing cyclist
