= Starship Troopers (soundtrack) =

Starship Troopers (Original Motion Picture Soundtrack)

Film score by Basil Poledouris
- Released: November 4, 1997
- Recorded: June–September 1997
- Studios: Sony Scoring Stage, Sony Pictures, Culver City, California
- Genre: Film score
- Length: 36:18
- Label: Varèse Sarabande
- Producers: Basil Poledouris; Curtis Roush; Eric Colvin; Tim Boyle

Basil Poledouris chronology
Switchback (1997)	Starship Troopers (Original Motion Picture Soundtrack) (1997)	Les Misérables (1998)

Starship Troopers (Original Motion Picture Soundtrack) is the film score composed and conducted by Basil Poledouris and performed by the Hollywood Studio Symphony to the 1997 film Starship Troopers directed by Paul Verhoeven. It was released through Varèse Sarabande on November 4, 1997, and featured 11 tracks. The complete score was later released as a double CD "deluxe edition" in June 2016.

== Background ==
Basil Poledouris had previously worked with Verhoeven on Flesh and Blood (1985) and RoboCop (1987). He intended to score it as an action film, but as Verhoeven wanted the music to offer a realistic background for the characters, Poledouris focused on creating excitement, passion and poignancy through its music. The basis for the score was derived from the theme of the Rodger Young spaceship, titled "Klendathu Drop" which Verhoeven had chosen. Poledouris developed themes for specific characters and relationships, including the one between Rico and Dizzy which was considered the "heart" of Starship Troopers, but did not create a theme for the Arachnids as he wanted their distinct noises to contrast with the score.

Poledouris wrote the film score within a span of six months. It was recorded at the Sony Pictures Studios recording stage between June and September 1997 with a full orchestra of 97 musicians using acoustic and percussion instruments. Evelyn Oz, a band including Poledouris' daughter, Zoë, performs two songs during the prom scene: an original song, "Into It", and "I Have Not Been to Oxford Town", composed by David Bowie.

== Reception ==
Thomas Glorieux of Maintitles wrote "This is not only an amazing action score, this is a thematic action score with hardly a dull moment in sight." James Southall of Movie Wave called it as "epic, glorious, Basil Poledouris at his very best." Christian Clemmensen of Filmtracks wrote "Starship Troopers is ambitiously rowdy ear candy, taking the heroic style from Robocop and magnifying it to nearly silly degrees that are engaging if only in their volume." Stephen Thomas Erlewine of AllMusic wrote "Although it doesn't hold up particularly well when its removed from the sci-fi film, Starship Troopers is an appropriately rousing and melodramatic score, perfectly suited to Paul Verhoeven's dizzying action flick."

== Original release ==
The Starship Troopers score was distributed by Varèse Sarabande which released through compact discs (CD) on November 4, 1997. The album did not include the complete score; it had only 36 minutes of music featured in the album. Bootleg copies which were made from the additional material using the score from the film's DVD release were surfaced thereafter.

Starship Troopers (Original Motion Picture Soundtrack) track listing
No.	Title	Length
1.	"Fed Net March"	0:48
2.	"Klendathu Drop"	4:29
3.	"Punishment / Asteroid Grazing"	4:50
4.	"Tango Urilla"	3:50
5.	"Hopper Canyon"	2:43
6.	"Bugs!!"	2:19
7.	"Dizzy's Funeral"	1:17
8.	"Destruction of Roger Young"	3:27
9.	"Brainbug"	3:58
10.	"They Will Win"	4:01
11.	"Into It"	4:36
Total length:		36:18

== Deluxe edition ==
On June 3, 2016, Varèse Sarabande unveiled the deluxe edition of the film's score in double CDs pressed to 3,000 copies. The album consisted of the complete score as heard in the film with materials which were unused partially or in full were included. Zoë's performance of the original song "Into It" and "I Have Not Been To Oxford Town", were included in the album. The album was further issued in a double LP on August 4, 2023.

Deluxe edition disc one track listing
No.	Title	Length
1.	"Fed-Net #1 / Bug Attack on Newsman"	2:52
2.	"Kiss in the Park" (unused)	1:01
3.	"Telepathy Practice / Carl Orders Cyrano"	0:43
4.	"Friends Forever"	0:44
5.	"Transporting"	1:20
6.	"Fed-Net #2 / Crime and Punishment"	0:19
7.	"Carmen's Shuttle Ride"	1:40
8.	"Undocking"	1:55
9.	"Teamwork"	0:46
10.	"Dear John"	1:03
11.	"Breckinridge Killed"	1:03
12.	"Punishment / Asteroid Grazing"	5:36
13.	"Call to War / Bad News from Home"	2:25
14.	"War!!"	0:53
15.	"Fed-Net #3 / Countdown to Victory"	0:39
16.	"Klandathu Drop"	4:45
17.	"Klendathu Battle" (unused)	3:59
18.	"Fed-Net #4"	0:59
19.	"The Fleet Limps Home" (partially unused)	3:07
20.	"Battle Ready"	0:36
21.	"Rasczak's Roughnecks"	0:53
22.	"Tango Urilla"	5:12
23.	"Johnny and Dizzy"	1:30
24.	"Hopper Canyon / Mess Hall Mess"	4:12
Total length:		48:12

Deluxe edition disc two track listing
No.	Title	Length
1.	"Bugs!!!"	3:00
2.	"Radio Shack / Whiskey Outpost Pt. 2 / Death of Dizzy"	7:25
3.	"Dizzy's Funeral"	1:16
4.	"Rico's Roughnecks / Destruction of the Rodger Young / Bug City"	9:33
5.	"Brainbug / Cave Nuke"	3:57
6.	"They Will Win"	3:59
7.	"End Titles"	10:03
8.	"Into It" (performed by Zoë Poledouris)	4:32
9.	"I Have Not Been to Oxford Town" (performed by Zoë Poledouris)	3:48
10.	"Klendathu Battle" (Version 1; unused)	4:14
11.	"Bugs!!!" (Version 1; unused)	2:59
Total length:		54:46

== Personnel ==
Credits adapted from liner notes.

- Music – Basil Poledouris
- Producer – Basil Poledouris, Curtis Roush, Eric Colvin, Tim Boyle
- Recording and mixing – Tim Boyle
- Mastering – Patricia Sullivan
- Supervising score editor – Curtis Roush
- Assistant score editor – James Burt
- Musical assistance – Julia Michels
- Executive producer – Robert Townson

Orchestra

- Performer – The Hollywood Studio Symphony
- Orchestration – Greig McRitchie, Steve Bramson, Steven Scott Smalley, Vince Bartold
- Conductor – Basil Poledouris
- Contractor – Sandy De Crescent
- Concertmaster – Endre Granat

Instruments

- Bass – Bruce P. Morgenthaler, Christian C. Kollgaard, Charles Domanico, David Parmeter, David Young, Donald V. Ferrone, Drew D. Dembowski, Edward Meares, Oscar Hidalgo, Peter Doubrovsky, Richard Feves, Steve Edelman, Susan A. Ranney, Arni Egilsson
- Bassoon – David W. Riddles, Kenneth E. Munday, Rose Corrigan, Michael R. O'Donovan
- Cello – Antony Cooke, Armen Ksajikian, Christine Ermacoff, Dane R. Little, Daniel Smith, David Low, David Speltz, Douglas Davis, John A. Walz, Matthew Cooker, Paul A. Cohen, Robert Adcock, Roger Lebow, Sebastian Toettcher, Steve Richards, Timothy E. Landauer, Todd Hemmenway, Dennis Karmazyn, Stephen P. Erdody
- Clarinet – Emily Bernstein, Gary S. Bovyer, Gary G. Gray, James M. Kanter
- Drums and percussions – Alan Estes, Donald J. Williams, Emil Radocchia, Gregory Goodall, Jerry Williams, Joe Porcaro, Larry Bunker, Peter Limonick, Steven Schaeffer, Thomas D. Raney
- Electronic percussions – Steve Forman
- Flute – David Shostac, Geraldine Rotella, James R. Walker, Samuel Karam, Susan Greenberg, Louise M. DiTullio
- French horn – Brian D. A. O'Connor, David A. Duke, John A. Reynolds, Kurt G. Snyder, Phillip E. Yao, Richard Todd, Steven Becknell, Todd L. Miller, James W. Thatcher
- Harp – Gayle Levant, Jo Ann Turovsky
- Keyboards – Eric D. Colvin, Michael A. Lang, Ralph E. Grierson, Steven Bramson, Steve Forman
- Oboe – Barbara Northcutt, Phillip Ayling, Earle D. Dumler
- Synthesizer – Eric Colvin
- Trombone – Alan L. Kaplan, William Reichenbach, Charles C. Loper, Phillip Teele, William Booth, Richard Nash
- Trumpet – Boyde W. Hood, Calvin Price, David W. Washburn, George Burnette Dillon, Jon Lewis, Rick Baptist, Roy L. Poper, Timothy G. Morrison, Warren H. Luening, Jr., Malcolm McNab
- Tuba – John Tommy Johnson
- Viola – Brian Dembow, Carrie Holzman-Little, Dan Lionel Neufeld, Denyse N. Buffum, Frances C. Moore, Janet Lakatos, Keith Greene, Marlow G. Fisher, Michael Nowak, Michael Ramos, Mihail Zinovyev, Rick Gerding, Robert L. Becker, Roland Kato, Simon Oswell, Victoria E. Miskolczy, Donald McInnes, Pamela Goldsmith
- Violin – Alan Grunfeld, Amy Hershberger, Anatoly Rosinsky, Armen Garabedian, Arnold Belnick, Berj Garabedian, Bruce Dukov, Carolyn Osborn, Charles H. Everett, Claudia Parducci, Darius Campo, Dennis Molchan, Dimitrie Leivici, Eun-Mee Ahn, Galina Golovin Zherdev, Gary Kuo, Haim Shtrum, Isabella Lippi, Jay Rosen, Jayme Miller, Julianne M. French, Julie Ann Gigante, Karen Jones, Ken Yerke, Kwihee Shamban Kahng, Liane Mautner Reynolds, Lily Ho Chen, Lisa M. Sutton Johnson, Margaret Wooten, Mari Tsumura Botnick, Michael J. Ferril, Michelle Richards Kikuchi, Miran Haig Kojian, Miwako Watanabe, Natalie Leggett, Patricia Johnson, Polly H. Sweeney, Rachel Stegeman Purkin, Rafael Rishik, Richard L. Altenbach, Robert Brosseau, Robin Olson, Ron Clark, Ronald Folsom, Sheldon Sanov, Sid Page, Susan Rishik Parmeter, Tamara L. Hatwan Chang, Tiffany Yi Hu

== Sources ==
- Sammon, Paul M. (1997). The Making Of Starship Troopers. United States: Little, Brown and Company. ISBN 978-0316644617.
