= Robert Crowley (CIA) =

CIA officer (1924–2000)

Robert Trumbull Crowley (July 13, 1924 – October 8, 2000) was an officer in the Central Intelligence Agency beginning in 1947, achieving the rank of assistant director for clandestine operations, second in command of the CIA's Directorate of Operations, which was in charge of covert operations.

A native of Chicago, Illinois and graduate of the United States Military Academy in West Point, New York, he served in the US Army in the Pacific theater during World War II. While at West Point, Crowley played for the Army Black Knights men's soccer program, where he was an NSCAA First-Team All-American in 1948. After the war, he remained in the United States Army Reserve, retiring with the rank of lieutenant colonel in 1986.

== The New KGB: Engine of Soviet Power ==
Crowley co-authored The New KGB: Engine of Soviet Power with William R. Corson. Released in 1985, the book asserts that the KGB took control of the Communist Party and the Soviet Union.

== Sources ==
Crowley was a source for David Wise's 1992 book Molehunt. Journalist, conspiracy theorist, forger, and holocaust denier Gregory Douglas claimed to have conducted a series of interviews with Crowley in 1993, later published in 2013 in his book Conversations with the Crow. Douglas wrote that Crowley euphemistically told him the CIA had assassinated Indian Prime Minister Shastri, as well as Indian nuclear scientist Homi Bhabha thirteen days apart in 1966 in order to thwart the Indian nuclear programme. The Indian media reported on these claims largely unquestioned.
