= David Dalton (violist) =

American violist (1934–2022)

David Johnson Dalton
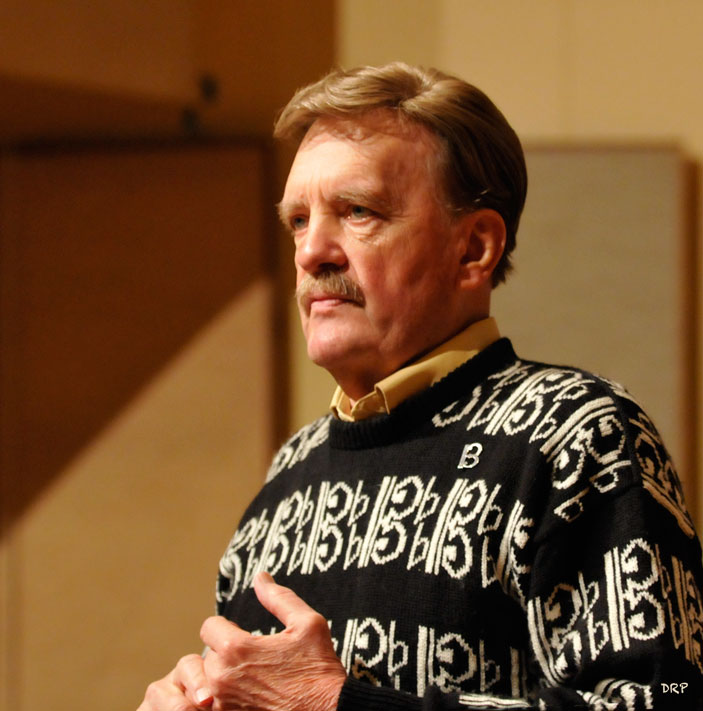
- Born: January 18, 1934; Springville, Utah, U.S.
- Died: December 23, 2022 (aged 88)
- Occupation: Classical viola player
- Known for: Working with William Primrose to form the Primrose International Viola Archive
- Spouse: Donna Glazier
- Children: 4

Academic background
- Education: Indiana University School of Music (Doc.Mus., 1970); Eastman School of Music (B.M, 1959; M.M, 1961); Munich Hochschule für Musik
- Thesis: The Genesis of Bartók's Viola Concerto (1970)

David Johnson Dalton (January 18, 1934 – December 23, 2022) was an American violist, author, and professor emeritus at Brigham Young University (BYU). He graduated from Eastman School of Music in 1961 and received his doctorate in viola performance in 1970 at Indiana University School of Music under William Primrose. As a faculty member at BYU, Dalton's main contribution was the establishment of the Primrose International Viola Archive, the largest collection of viola music in the world. Dalton's other significant positions include editor of the Journal of the American Viola Society, president of the American Viola Society, and president of the International Viola Society.

== Early life ==
David Dalton was born in 1934 to Jessie (Johnson) and Oliver Huntington Dalton in Springville, Utah. His father, a lifelong resident of Springville, was a prominent civic leader and cattleman. His mother was also a prominent member of the local community, known especially for her involvement in theater and the arts. She was a member of the Provo Fine Arts Club, Federated Music Club, and numerous other arts associations. David was born the third child of five, and grew up "pitching hay, threshing grain, and doing all those farm activities." David received his first violin at age eight, when he found it underneath the Christmas tree.

== Music education ==
Dalton began taking lessons soon after that, first from the local high school music director, Harmon Hatch, and later with John Hilgendorf. When he entered high school, Dalton studied with Lawrence Sardoni, the director of the BYU Symphony Orchestra. Dalton began studies at Brigham Young University himself in the fall of 1952, where he was named Concertmaster of the BYU Symphony Orchestra. In these early years of his musical training, Dalton often played at church and community events, both as a soloist and as a part of trios, quartets, and the Springville Civic Orchestra.

In college, Dalton's mentor was Harold Wolf, the concertmaster of the Utah Symphony. Dalton studied with Wolf for one year, and was concertmaster of the BYU Symphony for two years. In 1954, Dalton halted his studies at BYU and spent two and a half years in Germany on a proselyting mission for the Church of Jesus Christ of Latter-day Saints (LDS). While in Germany, Dalton had the opportunity to perform at the LDS soldiers' conference in Berchtesgaden, and tour Germany and France for one month, performing for 15 groups of the 12th U.S. Air Force. At the conclusion of his mission, Dalton enrolled at the Vienna Academy of Music, returning to Utah six months later.

He married Donna Glazier in the fall of 1957. They have three daughters and a son.

Also in 1957, Dalton was accepted at the Eastman School of Music in New York. He played with the Rochester-Eastman Symphony Orchestra in his first year there and with the Rochester Philharmonic for four years, and in 1958 was granted a scholarship. He received his Bachelor of Music degree with distinction on June 7, 1959. In 1960 he was one of six degree-seeking candidates invited to play at one of the school's concerto programs. In the same year, he received a Performer's Certificate and a full-tuition fellowship for graduate work. It was also at Eastman that Dalton was first introduced to the viola. After taking a required class in viola and on recommendation from his teacher, Dalton began playing viola with the Rochester Philharmonic, and did so for the next three years. In 1961, William Primrose joined the faculty at Eastman for the summer. "Blown away" after hearing Primrose practice, Dalton decided to permanently shift his focus from the violin to the viola. After graduating from Eastman, Dalton received the Bavarian State Music Scholarship to study at the Munich Hochschule für Musik, which he attended from 1961 to 1962.

== Teaching and academic career ==
Upon his return, Dalton was hired at Southwestern College in Winfield, Kansas as a string instructor and conductor of the college orchestra. After a year at Southwestern he was invited to join the faculty at Brigham Young University in the fall of 1963. He spent three years at Brigham Young University teaching viola and violin and was also instrumental in developing the university's chamber music program. In 1967 Dalton took a three-year leave of absence from Brigham Young University to complete a doctoral degree in viola performance at Indiana University School of Music. Dalton attended IU for three years, studying under his former mentor from Eastman—William Primrose. He wrote his dissertation on viola repertoire in 1970, including an interview with William Primrose and Tibor Serly, and the latter's involvement in preparing Bartók's manuscript for his viola concerto. The interviews were published in Music and Letters in 1976. After he received his doctorate in 1970, he returned to Brigham Young University. While teaching there, he helped form a faculty quartet called the Deseret String Quartet.

Dalton was the first editor of the Journal of the American Viola Society. He was president of the American Viola Society from 1986 to 1990 and president of the International Viola Society 1999–2001.

Dalton was extensively involved in both chamber and orchestral groups throughout his career. He was a long-time member of the Deseret String Quartet beginning in 1970, served as the director of the Young Chamber Players of Utah (1985–2001), and directed the music for several Brigham Young University opera productions including Falstaff, La Bohème, and Jenůfa. Dalton directed and participated in various orchestras. He was the principal violist for the Mobile Symphony in 1966, and conducted the Salt Lake Symphony from 1981 to 1994.

== Recognition and honors ==
In 1999 Dalton was elected "College string teacher of the year" by the Utah chapter of the American String Teachers Association. He has also been honored by the American Viola Society for his work with the Primrose International Viola Archive. Dalton was honored by the International Viola Society at their 40th international congress in 2012. He was recognized for his "advocacy of the viola and its literature through his published materials." In 2013 the International Viola Society awarded him the Golden Clef award, which is their highest honor.

== Involvement with Primrose and the Primrose International Viola Archive ==
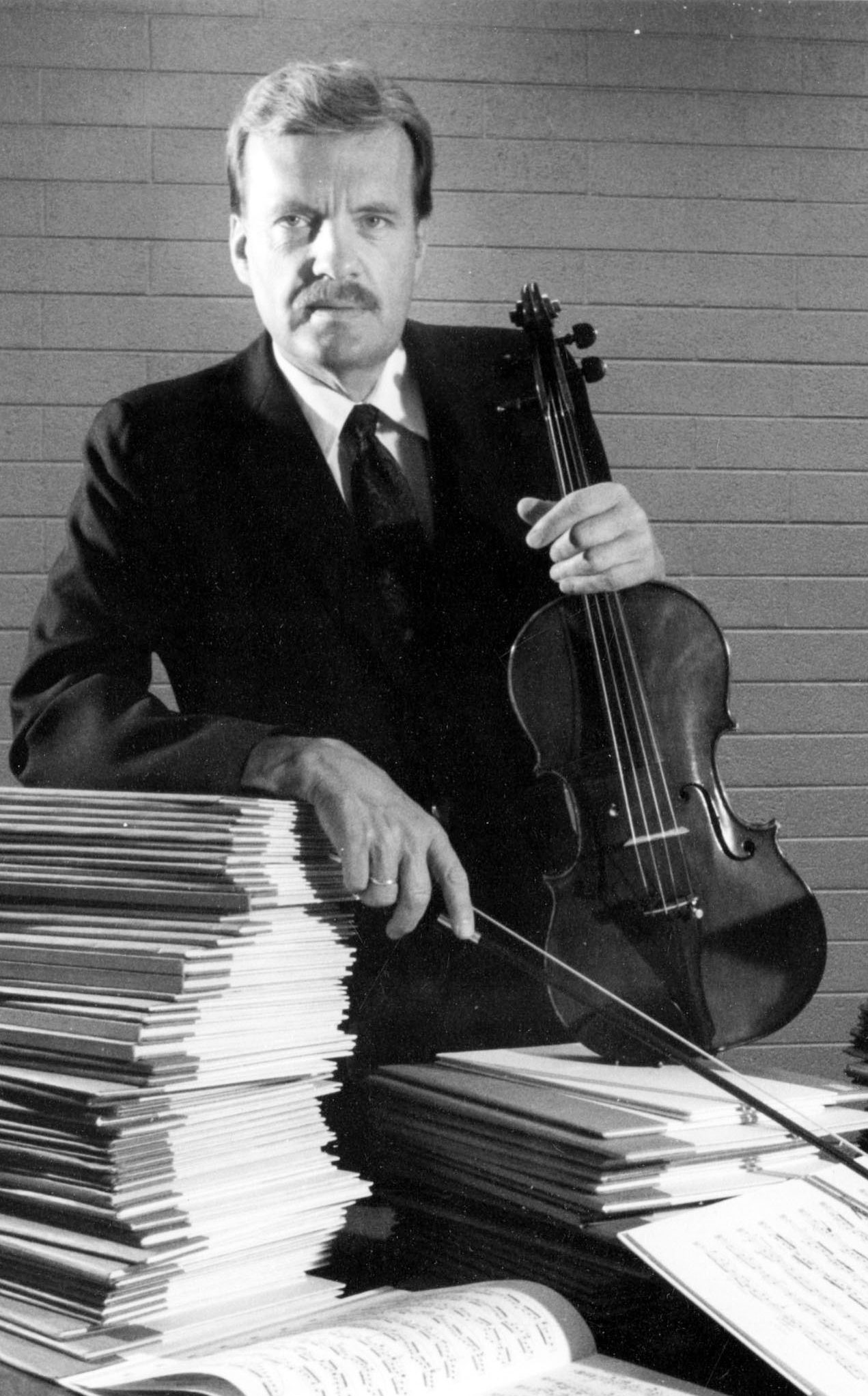
David Dalton with viola and scores in the Primrose International Viola Archive

In 1970 and at the request of Primrose, Dalton began working with his mentor to publish Primrose's memoirs. Over the next 7 years Dalton and Primrose collaborated extensively. In 1978 their efforts were published as Walk on the North Side: Memoirs of a Violist. Primrose and Dalton went on to publish another book in 1988, this one specifically on the viola, entitled Playing the Viola: Conversations with William Primrose.

While writing Primrose's memoirs, Dalton suggested that Brigham Young University's Harold B. Lee Library could preserve Primrose's papers. After meeting with library officials in 1974, Primrose decided to donate his memorabilia to the Harold B. Lee library as part of a project to start a national-scale viola archive. After Primrose's materials were housed, Dalton worked with Franz Zeyringer, president of the International Viola Society and other prominent violists to secure additional donations for the Primrose International Viola Archive. Dalton also worked with Zeyringer to solicit viola music from music publishers, successfully securing some more obscure scores for the archive.

== Publications and transcriptions ==
- Primrose, William. Walk on the North Side: Memoirs of a Violist. Provo, Utah: Brigham Young University Press, 1978.
- Playing the Viola: Conversations with William Primrose. New York: Oxford University Press, 1988.
- Zeyringer, Franz. Literatur fuer Viola. Translated by David Dalton. Hartberg, Austria: Verlag Julius Schoenwetter Jr., 1976.
- "The Bratsche at Bonn." American String Teacher (Indiana: August 1976).
- "Les Amis de l'Alto at Lille." American String Teacher (Cincinnati:Fall 1990).
- "Riley's History of the Viola." American String Teacher Volume XLII, Number 2 (Cincinnati: Spring 1992).
- "From Graz con grazia." American String Teacher (Athens:1981).
- "Lesson by Election." The Instrumentalist (Illinois: March 1976):pages 32–40.
- "Viola Vigor." The Instrumentalist (Illinois: March 1976): pages 14–21.
- "Competitions and the Lionel Tertis, 1984." Journal of the American Viola Society (Fall, 1984).
- "The Primrose International Viola Archive at BYU." Journal of the American Viola Society (Fall, 1982).
- "The Genesis of Bartok’s Viola Concerto." Music & Letters (Oxford:April 1976).
- "Goethe and the Composers of His Time." Music Review (Cambridge: May 1973).
- "Struck with Colours." Strad 101, Number 1201 (London: 1990).
- Suite in D, for Viola and Piano (Harpsichord), by Marin Marais; transcription by David Dalton, C.F. Peters, Inc., New York, New York, 1964.
- Romanza, for Soprano, Viola, and Piano (1st edition), by Gaetano Donizetti; edited by David Dalton Rarities for Strings Publications, Cleveland, Ohio, 1981.
- Chants d'Espagne de Joaquin Nin; arrangement pour Alto et Piano de David Dalton, Editions Max Eschig, Paris, 1984.
- "Three American Pieces for Unaccompanied Viola," by Aaron Minsky; transcription by David Dalton, Oxford University Press, 1991.

== See also ==
- Primrose International Viola Archive
- Viola Concerto (Bartók)
