= Ernst Wallfisch =

Violist, recording artist and pedagogue (1920 - 1979)

Ernst Wallfisch (27 May 1920 in Frankfurt am Main – 8 May 1979 in Northampton, Massachusetts) was a prominent viola soloist, recording artist and pedagogue, primarily remembered along with his wife, pianist Lory Wallfisch, as partners of the Wallfisch Duo.

Born into a musical family, Ernst Wallfisch immigrated to Bucharest, Romania in 1926. He studied violin with Cecilia Nitzulescu-Lupu at the Bucharest Conservatory. Having a strong attraction to the sound of the viola, he turned his attentions to the instrument at the age of 14 and made his highly praised début on viola at 18. At the Conservatory, he met violinist-composer George Enescu, who was one of his greatest sources of inspiration, and his wife Lory, a pianist with whom he started to perform during the War. They married in November 1944. Yehudi Menuhin heard the duo perform in Bucharest in May 1946 on the occasion of his first trip to Romania. Menuhin was deeply moved by their playing and helped the couple immigrate to the United States. They became American citizens in 1953, and had their only child, musician Paul Wallfisch in 1962.

Ernst Wallfisch and accompanist Alain Motard 1962 on tour of Southern Africa organised by Hans Adler.

Ernst Wallfisch was a member of the Pro Musica Quartet and the Bucharest Philharmonic Orchestra prior to his immigration, later a member of the Dallas Symphony Orchestra, Cleveland Orchestra, and principal violist with the Detroit Symphony Orchestra from 1953 to 1955. As the Wallfisch Duo, he performed throughout the United States, Canada, South America, Europe, North Africa and Israel. Pablo Casals provided another influence and long-lasting inspiration, which culminated in chamber music collaborations at several Pablo Casals Festivals in Prades between 1955 and 1961. As viola pedagogue, he taught at the Mozarteum University of Salzburg and at the Lucerne Conservatory. Both Ernst and Lory Wallfisch joined the music faculty of Smith College at Northampton, Massachusetts in 1964. Ernst Wallfisch died suddenly of a heart attack in 1979.

Wallfisch was also a master viola da gamba player, even making recordings.

Lory Wallfisch donated her husband's collection of viola music, approximately 300 items, to the Primrose International Viola Archive at Brigham Young University.

== Discography ==
Viola works

- Ernst und Lory Wallfisch at Pablo-Casals-Festival Prades – Ernst Wallfisch (viola); Lory Wallfisch (piano); Bayer Records; BR 200050 (1996)

Felix Mendelssohn: Sonata in C minor for viola and piano (1823–1824)
Johannes Brahms: Sonata in F minor for viola and piano, Op.120 No.1
Robert Schumann: Märchenbilder for viola and piano, Op.113 (1851)

- Ernest Bloch: Werke für Bratsche und Klavier (Works for Viola and Piano) – Ernst Wallfisch (viola); Lory Wallfisch (piano); EBS (1995)

Suite for viola and piano (1919)
Meditation et Processional for viola and piano (1951)
Suite Hébraïque for viola and piano (1951)
Suite for viola solo (1958)

- Ernst Wallfisch In Memoriam – Bayer-Records; BR 200 028 (1993)

Johann Baptist Wanhal: Concerto in C major for viola and orchestra; Jörg Faerber; Württembergisches Kammerorchester Heilbronn; recorded 1972
Niccolò Paganini: Sonata per la Gran' Viola in C minor for viola and orchestra (1834); Franz Allers; Nordwestdeutsche Philharmonie; recorded 1976
Carl Maria von Weber: Variations on "A Schüsserl und a Rein'dl'" in C major for viola and orchestra (1806); Wilhelm Brückner-Rüggeberg; NDR-Sinfonieorchester Hamburg; recorded 1976
Carl Maria von Weber: Andante e rondo ongarese in C minor for viola and orchestra, Op.35 (1809); Wilhelm Brückner-Rüggeberg; NDR-Sinfonieorchester Hamburg; recorded 1964
Gian Francesco Malipiero: Dialogo No.5 "Quasi Concerto" for viola and orchestra (1956); Sergiu Comissiona; Jerusalem Symphony Orchestra; recorded 1959

- Hindemith Chamber Music Vol. 6 – Ernst Wallfisch (viola); Lory Wallfisch (piano); Musical Heritage Society OR H-294 (1971)

Sonata for viola solo, Op.11 No.5
Sonata for viola and piano (1939)

- Hummel and Haydn – Ernst Wallfisch (viola); Lory Wallfisch (harpsichord); Jörg Faerber; Württembergisches Kammerorchester Heilbronn; Turnabout Vox 34079S

Johann Nepomuk Hummel: Fantasie in G minor for viola, 2 clarinets and string orchestra, Op.94
Michael Haydn: Concerto in C major for viola, harpsichord and string orchestra

- Lory et Ernst Wallfisch – Ernst Wallfisch (viola and violin); Lory Wallfisch (piano and harpsichord); INA Mémoire Vive; IMV029 (1998)

Charles Koechlin: Sonata for viola and piano, Op.53 (1911–1913); recorded 1957
Darius Milhaud: Sonata No. 2 for viola and piano, Op.244 (1944); recorded 1979
Marcel Mihalovici: Textes for viola and piano, Op.104 (1975); recorded 1979
Jean-Joseph de Mondonville: Sonata Concerto No.6 in A major for violin and harpsichord; recorded 1979

- Lory Wallfisch Remembers: A Festival of Romanian Music – Ernst Wallfisch (viola); Lory Wallfisch (piano); EBS 6146

George Enescu: Piesă de concert (Concertpiece) for viola and piano (1906)
Mihail Jora: Sonata for viola and piano, Op.32 (1956)

- Music for Viola and Piano – Ernst Wallfisch (viola); Lory Wallfisch (piano); Musical Heritage Society; MHS 1562

Felix Mendelssohn: Sonata in C minor for viola and piano (1823–1824)
Joseph Joachim: Variationen über ein eigenes Thema for viola and piano, Op.10 (1854)

- Stamitz Concerti – Suzanne Lautenbacher (violin); Ernst Wallfisch (viola); Jörg Faerber; Württembergisches Kammerorchester Heilbronn; Turnabout Vox TV34221

Carl Stamitz: Concerto in D major for viola and orchestra, Op.1, No. 1
Carl Stamitz: Sinfonia Concertante in D major for violin, viola and orchestra (1780–1782)

- Telemann Suite and Concertos – Ernst Wallfisch (viola and viola da gamba); Ulrich Koch (viola); Jörg Faerber; Württembergisches Kammerorchester Heilbronn; Turnabout Vox TV 34288

Concerto in G major for viola and string orchestra, TWV 51:G9
Concerto in G major for 2 violas and string orchestra, TWV 52:G3
Suite in D major for viola da gamba and string orchestra

Chamber works

- Casals Festival at Prades: Live Concert Performances – Music & Arts Program (2003)

Wolfgang Amadeus Mozart: Piano Quartet No.2 in E♭ major, K.493; Yehudi Menuhin (violin), Ernst Wallfisch (viola), Pablo Casals (cello), Mieczysław Horszowski (piano)

- Johannes Brahms String Sextets – Yehudi Menuhin, Robert Masters (violins), Cecil Aronowitz, Ernst Wallfisch (violas), Maurice Gendron, Derek Simpson (celli); EMI Classics

String Sextet No.1 in B♭ major, Op.18
String Sextet No.2 in G major, Op.36

- Max Reger - Kammermusik Vol.4 – Ernst Wallfisch (viola), Lory Wallfisch (piano), Philipp Naegele (violin) - Da Camera Magna 77 504 CD

Suite for viola solo No.1 in G minor, Op.131d/1 (1916)
Suite for viola solo No.2 in D major, Op.131d/2 (1916)
Suite for viola solo No.3 in E minor, Op.131d/3 (1916)
Piano Trio No.1 in B minor, Op.2 (1891) w.viola
