= Donald McInnes (violist) =

American violist (1939–2024)

- Born: Donald McLeod McInnes; March 7, 1939; San Francisco, California, U.S.
- Died: October 23, 2024 (aged 85); Rancho Mirage, California, U.S.
- Education: University of California, Santa Barbara; University of Southern California
- Years active: 1955–2019
- Children: 3
- Musical career
- Genre: Classical
- Instruments: Viola
- Formerly of: Pittsburgh Symphony Orchestra; Santa Barbara Symphony Orchestra; Seattle Symphony

Donald McLeod McInnes (March 7, 1939 – October 23, 2024) was an American violist. He studied at the University of California, Santa Barbara (UC Santa Barbara) and the University of Southern California (USC). His teachers William Primrose and Jascha Heifetz were influential on his later career as a soloist, orchestra member, and viola teacher. He was principal violist of various orchestras, including the Pittsburgh Symphony Orchestra, the Santa Barbara Symphony Orchestra, and the Seattle Symphony. In 1974, McInnes premièred "Concerto on Old English Rounds for Viola," a work he commissioned from William Schuman through a grant from the Ford Foundation. He also premiered Vincent Persichetti's "Parable XVI" in 1975. He recorded Harold en Italie with Leonard Bernstein and the Orchestre National de France.

McInnes taught at the Music Academy of the West, Idyllwild Arts Academy, the University of Michigan, the University of Cincinnati – College-Conservatory of Music, and the University of Washington before teaching at USC for over 30 years.

== Early life and education ==
Donald McLeod McInnes was born on March 7, 1939, in San Francisco, California. His first viola teacher was Stefan Krayk. He received his bachelor's degree in music from UC Santa Barbara, and his master's degree from the University of Southern California, where he studied with William Primrose. McInnes frequently sought his advice in his early solo career. Jascha Heifetz guided his professional development as a soloist, counseling him to maintain good relationships with the conductor and principal violist of orchestras he performed with. He attended the Music Academy of the West from 1954 to 1956, where he often listened to Lotte Lehmann sing.

== Career ==
=== Performing and recording ===
McInnes performed as principal violist with the Santa Barbara Symphony from 1955 to 1961, with the Seattle Symphony from 1966-1968, and with the Pittsburgh Symphony from 1972 to 1973. McInnes was a participating artist in the Marlboro Music School and Festival in 1970 and 1971. McInnes played 14 seasons with Camerata Pacifica, a chamber ensemble in Santa Barbara, California. He also performed with the New York Philharmonic, the Boston Symphony Orchestra, and the Orchestre National de France.

In 1970, McInnes performed Henri Casadesus's viola concerto, and Paul Hindemith's Trauermusik with the Port Angeles Symphony. In 1972, he performed Igor Stravinsky's Elegy for solo viola at a "mini-festival" in honor of Stravinsky at the University of Washington. He performed Bartok's viola concerto with the Boise Philharmonic in 1975.

McInnes performed many premieres of new works for viola, including works commissioned with his performance in mind. These included works by William Schuman, Vincent Persichetti, William Bergsma, Robert Suderberg, Paul Tufts, and Thomas Pasatieri. In 1971, McInnes received a grant from the Ford Foundation for musicians under age 35, through which he commissioned William Schuman to write "Concerto on Old English Rounds for Viola." McInnes premiered the work in 1974 with Michael Tilson Thomas conducting the Boston Symphony. McInnes also performed and recorded the work with Leonard Bernstein conducting the New York Philharmonic. In a review of the New York performance, Harold C. Shonberg described McInnes as a "sensitive musician" "with a gorgeous, mellow sound". McInnes premiered Perschetti's Parable XVI at the International Viola Congress on June 29, 1975. McInnes also priemered Bergsma's Variations and a Fantasy for Viola and Orchestra in 1978, and Sunderberg's VIOLA I for Solo Viola in 1988. Fantasy for Solo Viola by Paul Louis Fink and Sonata for Viola and Piano by Paul Tufts are dedicated to him; McInnes premiered both in 1974.

McInnes's collaboration with Bernstein continued and he recorded Harold en Italie by Hector Berlioz with him in 1976. In Classical Music: The Essential Listening Companion, Goodfellow described McInnes's recording as "less prepossessing" than William Lincer's performance of the same piece. In 2001, Ivan March reviewed the CD re-issue in his The Penguin Guide to Compact Discs. He described McInnes as playing with "superbly rich and even tone."

During his career McInnes performed many solo recitals. Donal Henahan reviewed one of his 1979 recitals in The New York Times. Henahan called the recital "splendid." He praised McInnes's "technical finesse" and wrote that the performance of "Fantastic Variations on a Theme From 'Tristan'" "blossom[ed] dramatically." In contrast, Henahan was not as moved by McInnes's performance of works by Marais, Ravel, and Paganini.

McInnes performed in many symphony recordings for film soundtracks during the twenty-five years he lived in Los Angeles. These films included The Little Mermaid, Titanic, and Red October. He also played in Barbara Streisand's orchestra on tour as her principal violist from 1985 to 2000.

In 2009, McInnes retired from performing, but not from teaching.

=== Teaching and publishing ===
McInnes was a renowned professor of viola at various universities for 53 years of his life. He taught at the University of Washington from 1966-1979, at the University of Cincinnati – College-Conservatory of Music from 1979 to 1982, at the University of Michigan from 1982-1985, and at the University of Southern California (USC) from 1985 until 2019. McInnes taught outside of the university setting as well. He taught at the Music Academy of the West, Idyllwild Arts Academy, and the BANFF Center. He taught as a guest professor at the Royal Conservatory in Barcelona, Spain, the Shanghai Conservatory and the Central Conservatory in Beijing. McInnes's teaching style includes scale studies and etudes, as well as studies in orchestral repertoire.

His students who have gone on to be professional violists include Katheryn Steely, Valerie Kuinka, and Cynthia Phelps.

McInnes made arrangements of popular classical music pieces for viola, publishing them through Ovation Press. He retired from university teaching in 2019.

== Personal life ==
McInnes and his husband had three children together. He died at his Rancho Mirage home on October 23, 2024, at the age of 85.

== Awards and honors ==
McInnes was on the board of the American Viola Society from 1982 until 1996. He received two awards from the American Viola Society. In 1989, he received the distinguished service award, and in 1995, he received an "outstanding achievement" plaque. McInnes received the Silver Alto Clef award in 2007 from the International Viola Society.

== Discography ==
- As violist in the solo string quartet in a performance of Vivaldi Gallery: For Divided Orchestra and String Quartet.
- As the solo violist performing "Fantastic Variations for viola and piano, on a theme from Tristan".
- As the soloist on Concerto on Old English Rounds for viola, women's chorus and orchestra, with Leonard Bernstein conducting the New York Philharmonic.
- In 1977, McInnes recorded Harold en Italie by Hector Berlioz with Leonard Bernstein conducting the Orchestre National de France.
  - Later, this recording was compiled on an EMI Classics 2-disc set with Berlioz's Symphonie fantastique and 5 Overtures.
- As second violist on the LaSalle Quartet's recording of Schoenburg's Verklärte Nacht Streichtrio.
- As violist in the quartet performing Robert Suderburg's "Solo Music II, Ritual Cycle of Lyrics and Dance for Unaccompanied Viola"
