= Primrose International Viola Archive =

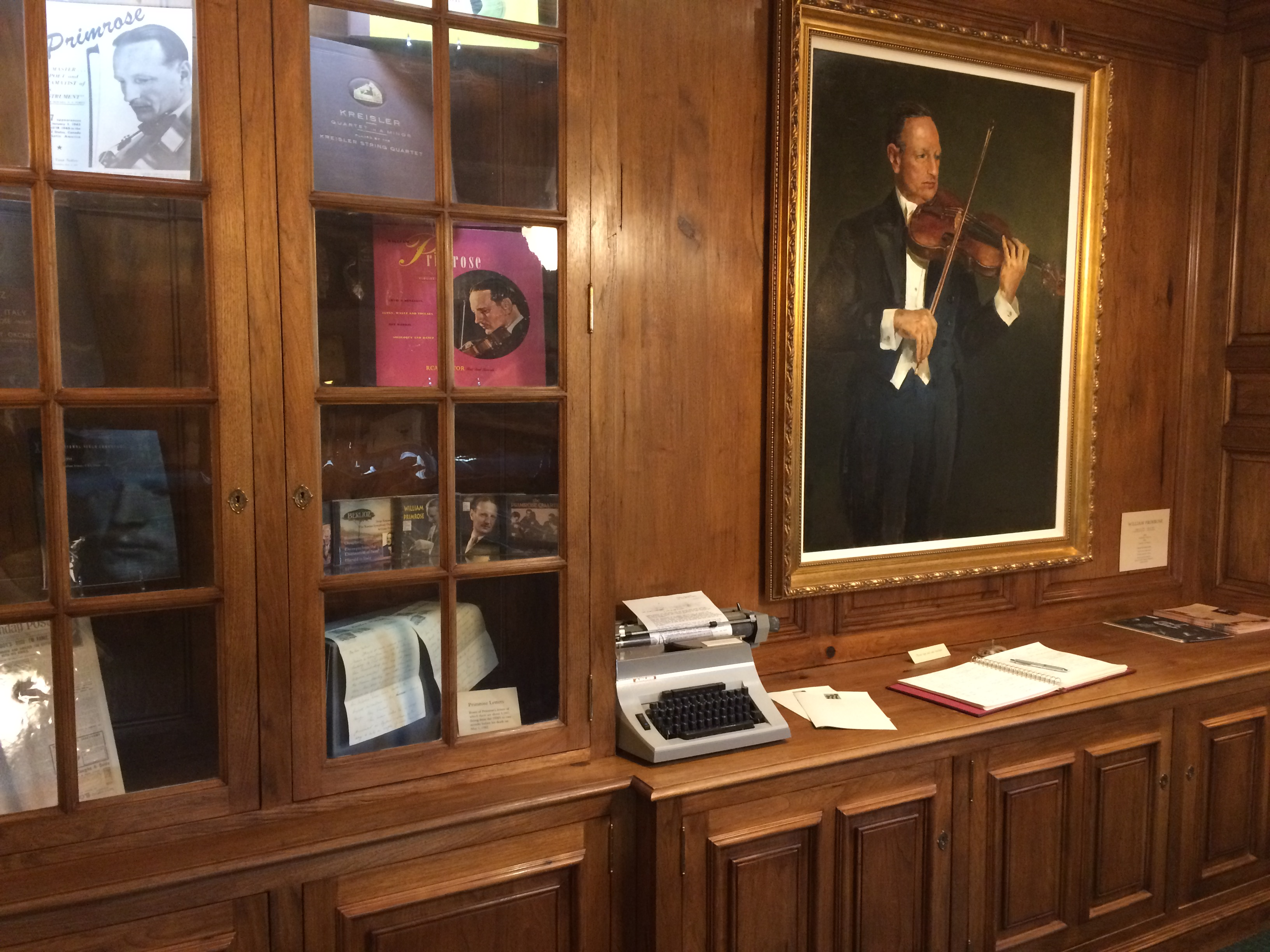
- Portrait and cabinet in the Primrose International Viola Archive at Brigham Young University.
- Interactive map of Primrose International Viola Archive
- 40.2487°N 111.6493°W
- Alternative name: PIVA
- Location: Provo, United States of America
- Type: Music archives
- Established: 1974; 52 years ago
- Affiliation: Brigham Young University; International Viola Society; American Viola Society

Building information
- Building: Harold B. Lee Library
- Website: Official website

The Primrose International Viola Archive (PIVA) is the official viola archive of both the International Viola Society and American Viola Society and the largest collection of viola music in the world. It is located in the Harold B. Lee Library at Brigham Young University. Scottish-American violist William Primrose started the archive with the donation of his many materials on the viola.

It was previously known as the William Primrose Viola Library and the Primrose International Viola Society's Archive.

== History ==
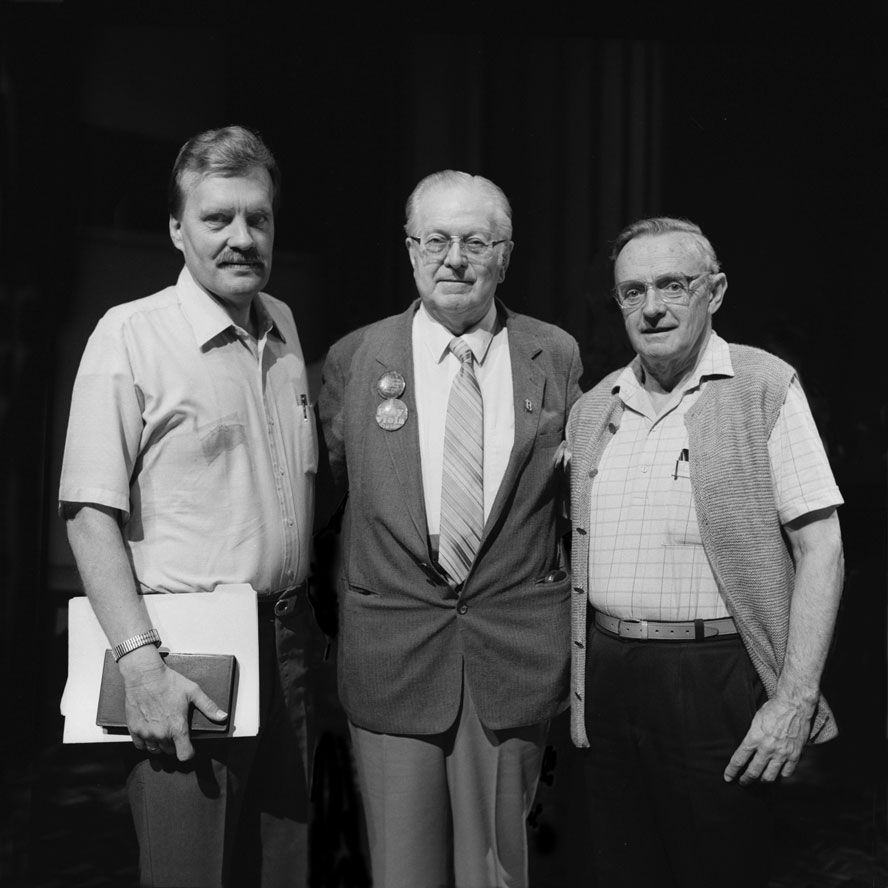
David Dalton, Maurice W. Riley, and Franz Zeyringer at International Viola Congress XV, Ann Arbor, Michigan

The Primrose International Viola Archive was initially proposed in 1974 using the existing viola holdings of the Harold B. Lee Library (HBLL) at Brigham Young University (BYU) along with contributions from Scottish-American violist William Primrose, forming the William Primrose Viola Library. BYU faculty violist emeritus David Dalton had studied viola under William Primrose at Indiana University, and had established a close friendship with him. While helping Primrose to write his memoirs, Dalton suggested that the HBLL could preserve Primrose's papers. After meeting with library officials in 1974, the Primrose Viola Archive was established in 1979 when Primrose agreed to donate his viola sheet music and memorabilia to the library to start a national-scale viola archive.

In 1981, the International Viola Society combined its archive in Austria with the Primrose archive, and the archive's name changed to the Primrose International Viola Archive. From 1983, the archive has collected newly published viola music and made a special effort to make its repository of viola music exhaustive. Notable donors include Jan Albrecht, Paul Doktor, Ulrich Druner, Walter Lebermann, Rudolf Tretzsch, Ernst Wallfisch, and Franz Zeyringer, founder of the International Viola Society. In 2005, Brigham Young University hosted the American Viola Society's Primrose International Viola Competition and Festival.

== Holdings ==
The PIVA includes over 6,000 published scores, around 250 sound recordings, and hundreds of manuscripts and correspondence. It is considered "the largest viola collection in the world".

The collection includes viola manuscripts from Primrose's collection, a viola manuscript by Ernst Toch with a dedication to Primrose, a holograph score of Efrem Zimbalist's "Sarasateana: Suite of Spanish Dances," Milhaud's second viola concerto with a dedication from the composer, the working manuscript for Béla Bartók's viola concerto, and the manuscript for George Rochberg's Viola Sonata. The collection also includes Primrose recordings and a Primrose photo archive.

== Gallery ==
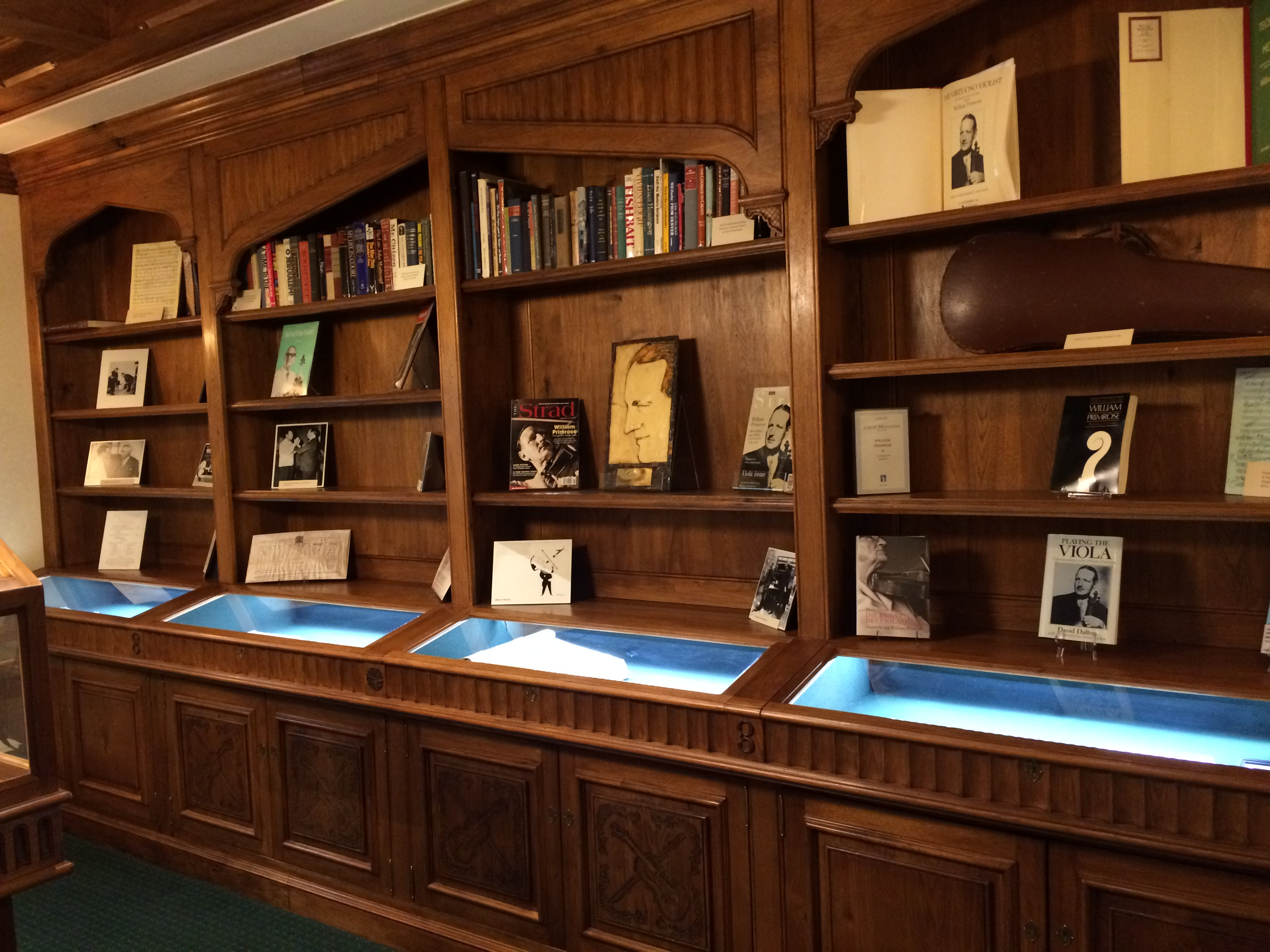
Display cabinets

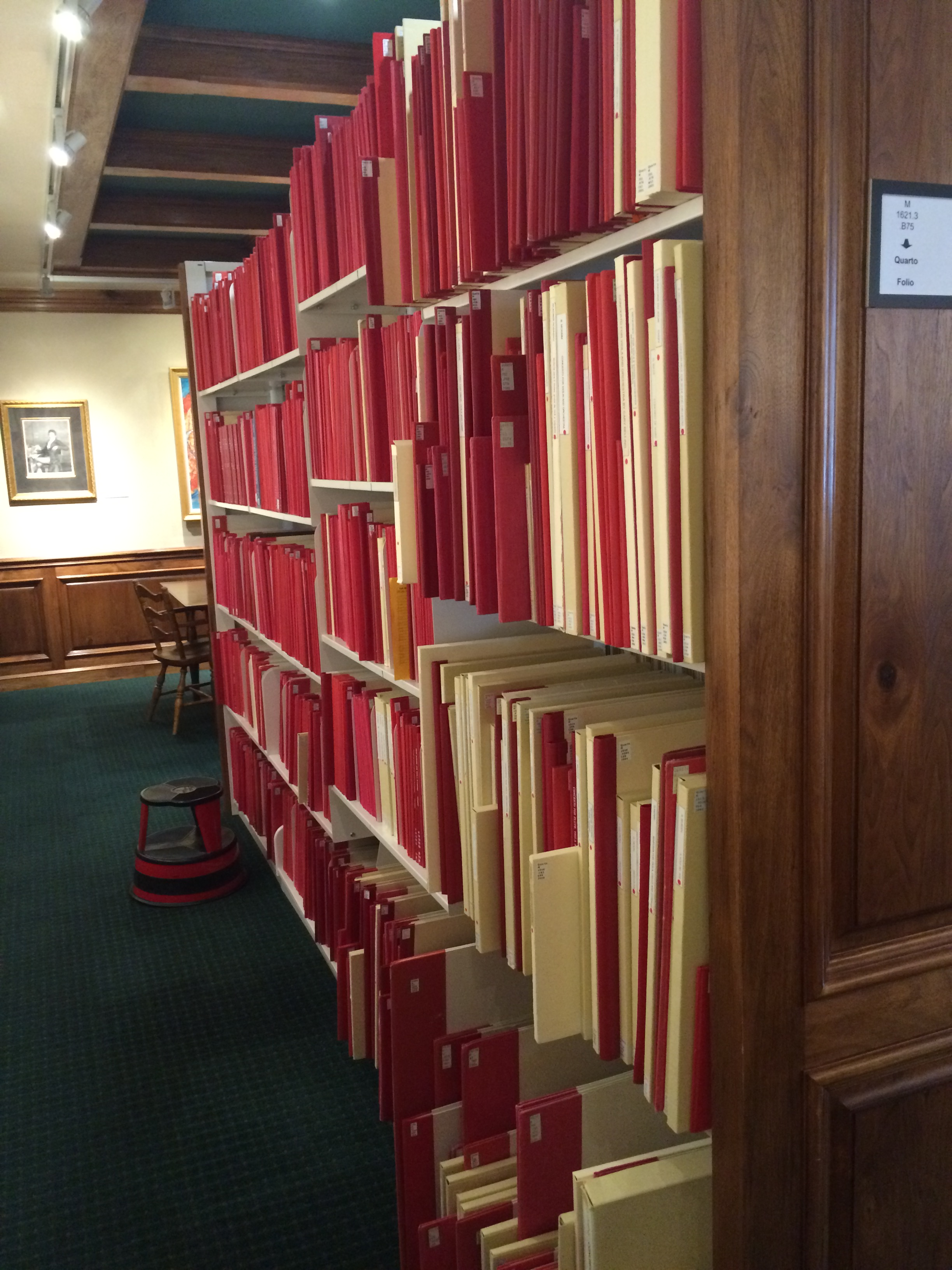
Viola music stacks

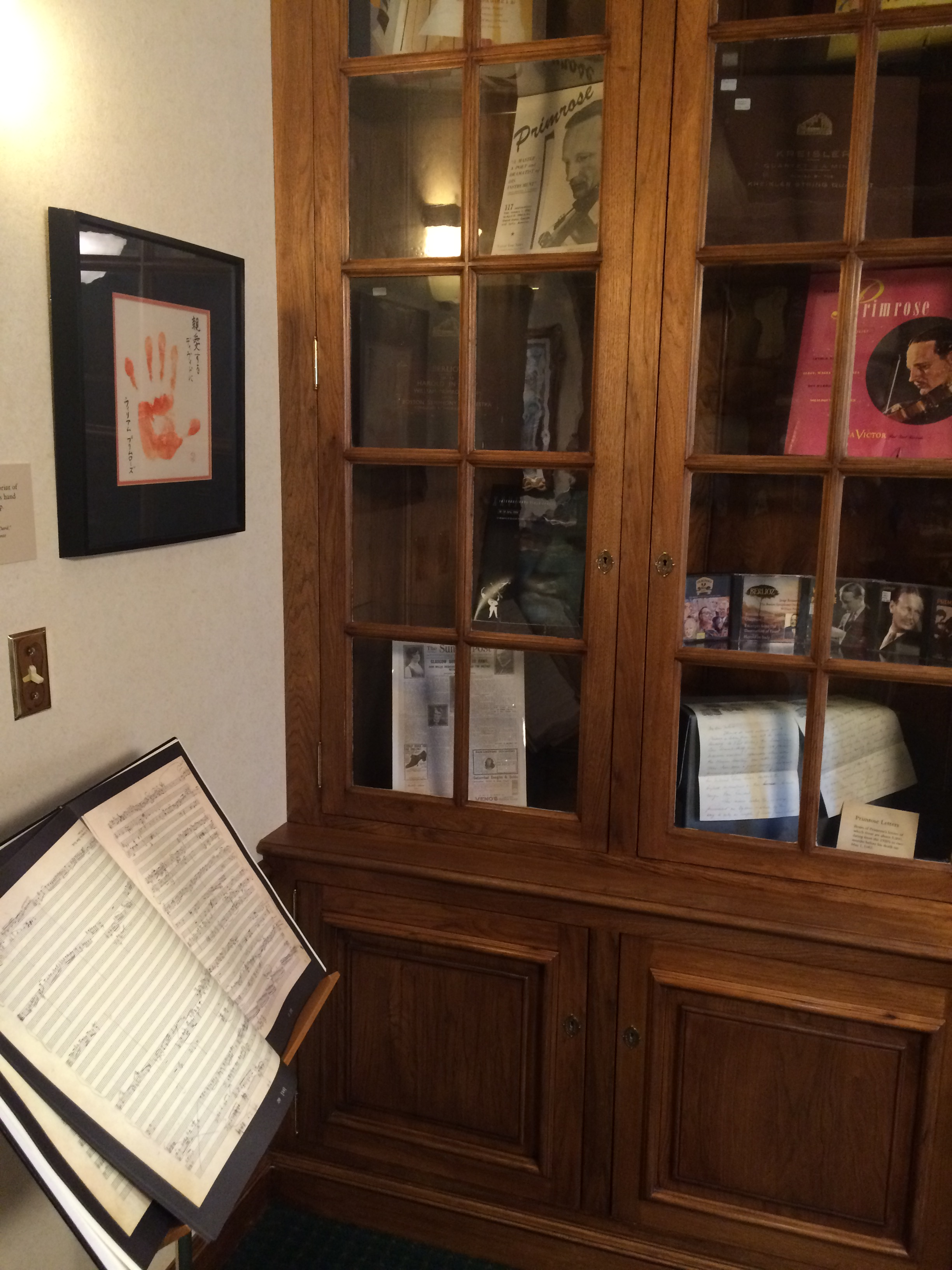
Primrose's handprint and a reproduction of the Bartok score
