= Paul Gallez =

Argentine cartographer and historian (1920–2007)

Paul Gallez (1920–2007) was an Argentine cartographer and historian. Born in Brussels, he was based in the city of Bahía Blanca, province of Buenos Aires, Argentina.

Gallez made an extensive research on maps to show that America was known long before the Age of Discovery, inspired by previous works by Dick Edgar Ibarra Grasso and Enrique de Gandía. He was the first to identify all the principal fluvial system of South America in the Henricus Martellus Germanus map of 1489, using a distortion grid. Gallez considered that fellow historians and himself, constitute the so-called Argentine School of Protocartography.

== Publications ==
- "Région polarisée et région-plan. La région argentine du Comahue et le problème de ses limites" (1967, Économie appliquée)
- "Problems of regional planning in semi arid countries" (1970, The Annals of Regional Science)
- "Analyse d’un cercle vicieux microéconomique de la misère" (1970, L'Actualité économique)
- "Planificacion triangular en Patagonia Central" (1971, Erdkunde)
- "Les Grands Fleuves d'Amérique du Sud sur le Ptolémée Londonien d'Henri Hammer (1489)" (1975, Erdkunde)
- "Trois thèses de prédécouverte de l'Amérique du Sud par le Pacifique" (1976, Gesnerus)
- "Le Pays des Alacalufs (Terre de Feu) sur les planisphères de 1489 à 1548" (1978, Sudhoffs Archiv)
- "Les travaux de l'Ecole Argentine de Protocartographie" (1978, Archives internationales d'Histoire des Sciences)
- "L'Amérique du Sud sur une carte arabe du IXe siècle: avec 7 cartes" (1979, Sudhoffs Archiv)
- "Walsperger and His Knowledge of the Patagonian Giants" (1981, Imago Mundi)
- La Cola del Dragón: América del Sur en los mapas antiguos, medievales y renacentistas (1990)
- Cristobal de Haro. Banqueros y pimenteros en busca del estrecho magallánico (1991)
- Protocartografia y exploraciones (1999)

== See also ==
- Dick Edgar Ibarra Grasso
- Enrique de Gandía
- Pre-Columbian trans-oceanic contact
