= Howie Yeager =

American football player (1915–2000)

Howard Leon Yeager
No. 6
- Position: Wingback

Personal information
- Born: February 19, 1915; Orosi, California, U.S.
- Died: July 22, 2000 (aged 85); Purcellville, Virginia, U.S.
- Listed height: 5 ft 11 in (1.80 m)
- Listed weight: 173 lb (78 kg)

Career information
- High school: John Muir High School
- College: UC Santa Barbara Gauchos
- NFL draft: 1938: undrafted

Career history
- New York Giants (1941)

Howard Leon Yeager (February 19, 1915 – July 22, 2000) was an American football wingback who played in the National Football League (NFL) with the New York Giants. He played college football for the UC Santa Barbara Gauchos and is a member of the school's hall of fame.

== Early life and education ==
Yeager was born in Orosi, California, and attended the University of California, Santa Barbara. He was a student-athlete, participating in the Gauchos' football and track & field teams. He was the UCSB record holder for the 100 broad jump and low hurdles. He was inducted to the UC Santa Barbara Gauchos Hall of Fame.

== Football career ==
Yeager played for the Jersey City Giants of the American Association in 1938. The team served as a farm team for the New York Giants and Yeager was under consideration for promotion to the parent club, but a move never materialized.

Yeager was moved up to the parent club, New York Giants, for the 1941 NFL season. He appeared in 10 games where he gained 287 yards and scored 4 touchdowns.

After returning from World War II, Yeager played for the Los Angeles Bulldogs who built their offense around him.

== Personal life ==
The start of American involvement in World War II saw the conclusion of Yeager's NFL career as he became a fighter pilot. While serving, he suffered severe burns while attending to a plane crash, saving at least one life in the process.
