= Archibald Craig (fencer) =

British fencer (1887–1960)

Personal information
- Born: Archibald David Edmonstone Craig; 24 March 1887 Walton-on-Thames, Surrey, England
- Died: 30 December 1960 (aged 73) Willesden, London, England

Sport
- Sport: FencingSummer Olympics Sporting Events 1924 Paris, France
- Events: Men's Épée, Summer Olympics (oldest participant) Sporting Events 1948 London, England

Archibald David Edmonstone Craig (24 March 1887 – 30 December 1960) was a British fencer. He competed at the 1924 and 1948 Summer Olympics.
