= William R. Corson =

American author

- Military career
- Allegiance: United States
- Branch: Army and Marine Corps
- Rank: Lieutenant colonel

William Raymond Corson (September 25, 1925 – July 17, 2000) was an American author and a retired lieutenant colonel in the United States Marine Corps. He was an expert on counterinsurgency warfare and served the majority of his career as an intelligence officer on special assignment with the Central Intelligence Agency.

== Education and military service ==
Corson was born in Chicago.

He studied at the University of Chicago until he enlisted in the US Marine Corps on 12 December 1942. He saw combat on Guam and Bougainville. After the war, he pursued higher education again, obtaining a master's degree in business and economics from the University of Miami and later a doctorate in economics from American University.

In 1949, Corson joined the U.S. Marine Corps as a commissioned officer, and served in the Korean War in 1952. From 1953 to 1955 he was a student at the Naval Intelligence School in Washington, studying the Chinese language. He was later made a liaison officer in Hong Kong, serving from 1958 to 1962.

After this he was assigned to the office of the secretary of defense, specializing in Asian affairs. In this role, Corson gained contacts at the highest level U.S. decision making in regards to the war in Southeast Asia.

Corson became an instructor at the U.S. Naval Academy, teaching a course on Communism and the Revolutionary War from 1964 to 1966. He later taught history at Howard University for a year.

He was sent to Vietnam in 1966, initially commanding a Marine Corps tank battalion before being given command of the Combined Action Program (CAP) the following year. The CAP provided security from communist insurgents and worked to gain the trust of the local Vietnamese population. According to an official Marine Corps history the program was highly successful, and Corson won the praise of his superiors.

Returning to the United States in 1967, he was given another sensitive assignment as deputy director of the Southeast Asia Intelligence Force, a role in which he worked closely with the Central Intelligence Agency.

== Decorations ==
Corson was awarded the Navy Commendation Medal with combat "V".

== Writing career ==
Corson retired in 1968, and subsequently began his career writing books. For several years, he wrote a column on veterans affairs for Penthouse magazine, serving as the publication's Washington editor.

== Family ==
His first marriage to Charlotte Corson ended in divorce, although they produced two children, Christopher and David. He later married Judith C. Corson, with whom he had three children: Adam, Zachary, and Andrew. William and Judith remained married until his death in 2000.

== Publications ==
=== Articles ===
- "Declaration of War Against Heroin." Penthouse, vol. 2, no. 5 (Jan. 1971).
- "Toward a Concept of Military Domestic Action." Naval War College Review, vol. 24, no. 8 (Apr. 1972), pp. 15–26. JSTOR 44641306.

=== Books ===
- The Betrayal. New York: W. W. Norton & Co. (1968)
- Promise or Peril: The Black College Student in America. New York: W. W. Norton & Co. (1970)
- Consequences of Failure. New York: W. W. Norton & Co. (1973)
- New KGB: Engine of Soviet Power, with R. Crowley. New York: William Morrow & Co. (1985)
- The Armies of Ignorance: The Rise of the American Intelligence Empire. New York: Dial Press/J. Wade (1986)
- Widows, with Susan B. Trento and Joseph J. Trento. New York: Crown Publishers (1989)
