= Fay Alexander =

American stunt man and circus acrobat

Fay L. Alexander (October 19, 1924 - July 16, 2000) was a stunt man and circus acrobat. He was one of the first trapeze artists to perform a triple somersault (a trick noteworthy for fatal attempts). Alexander performed it routinely. In Hollywood, he performed stunts for Tony Curtis and Doris Day and was in several movies about circus life.
