= Ludwig Bielenberg =

German sailor

Personal information
- Nationality: German
- Born: 1 June 1930; Kiel, Germany
- Died: 26 July 2000 (aged 70); Hamburg, Germany

Sport
- Sport: Sailing

Ludwig Bielenberg (1 June 1930 – 26 July 2000) was a German sailor. He competed at the 1952 Summer Olympics and the 1956 Summer Olympics.
