= Fred C. Sheffey =

United States Army general (1928–2000)

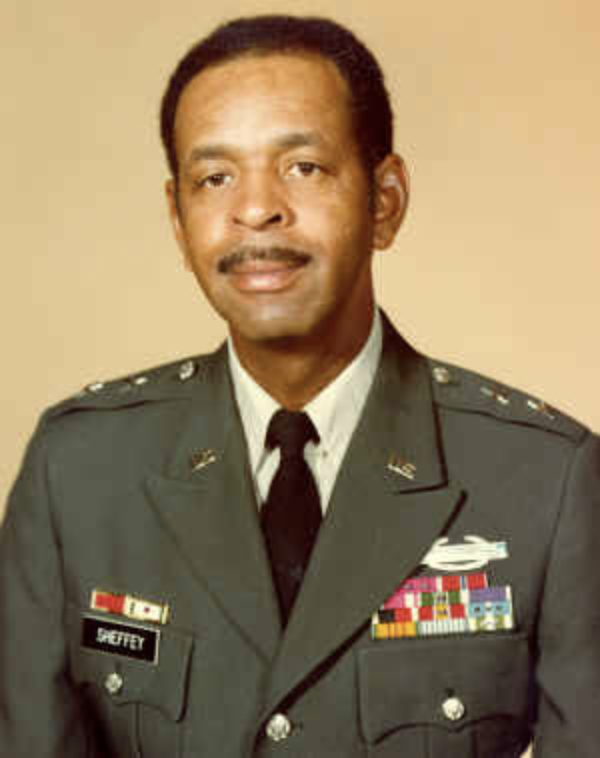
- Born: August 28, 1928; McKeesport, Pennsylvania
- Died: July 25, 2000 (aged 71); De Soto, Texas
- Burial place: Arlington National Cemetery
- Military career
- Allegiance: United States of America
- Branch: United States Army
- Service years: 1950–1980
- Rank: Major General
- Conflicts: Korean War; Vietnam War
- Awards: Distinguished Service Medal(3); Legion of Merit; Bronze Star; Purple Heart

Fred Clifton Sheffey Jr. (August 27, 1928 – July 25, 2000) was a major general in the United States Army.

== Early life and education ==
Sheffey was born and grew up in McKeesport, Pennsylvania. He attended Central State University in Wilberforce, Ohio, where he participated in Army Reserve Officers' Training Corps and was a four year starter and all-conference selection at guard on the basketball team. He was commissioned a second lieutenant in the infantry upon graduating with a BS in economics. Sheffey later earned a master’s in business administration from Ohio State University and a master's degree in international affairs from George Washington University.

== Military service ==
Shortly after graduating Sheffey was assigned to the 24th Infantry Regiment of the 25th Infantry Division and sent to Korea as an infantry platoon leader. Shortly after bing promoted to first lieutenant in April 1951, he was severely wounded in the upper right hip from mortar shrapnel and was evacuated back to the United States. After spending 18 months in the hospital, Sheffey was assigned to train infantrymen at Fort Indiantown Gap before being detailed to the Quartermaster Corps in 1953.

Sheffey was promoted to Lieutenant Colonel in January 1966 and given command of the 266th Quartermaster Battalion. He deployed to Vietnam with the 266th in June 1966. Sheffey was promoted to Colonel in 1970 after graduating from the National War College. He deployed to Vietnam for a second tour in May 1971 and commanded the 54th General Support Group. Upon his return in July 1972 he was named the Director of Financial Resources for the Office of the Deputy Chief of Staff of Logistics at the Pentagon. Sheffey was promoted to Brigadier General on July 1, 1973.

Sheffey was then named the Director of Materiel Management, during which he was promoted to Major General. In 1977, Sheffey became the first African American to command the Quartermaster School, Quartermaster Training Command and Fort Lee. His appointment initially caused public outcry because he was not originally named post commander at Fort Lee in addition to the schools, which traditionally were a combined command. Sheffey was named post commander shortly afterwards, with the Army explaining that there had been "an administrative error." Sheffey retired from the Army in 1980.

== Post Military Life ==
After retiring from the Army, Sheffey worked for Lockheed Martin. Sheffey died of lung cancer on July 25, 2000, in De Soto, Texas. He was interred in Arlington National Cemetery.
