= Depé =

French association football supporter

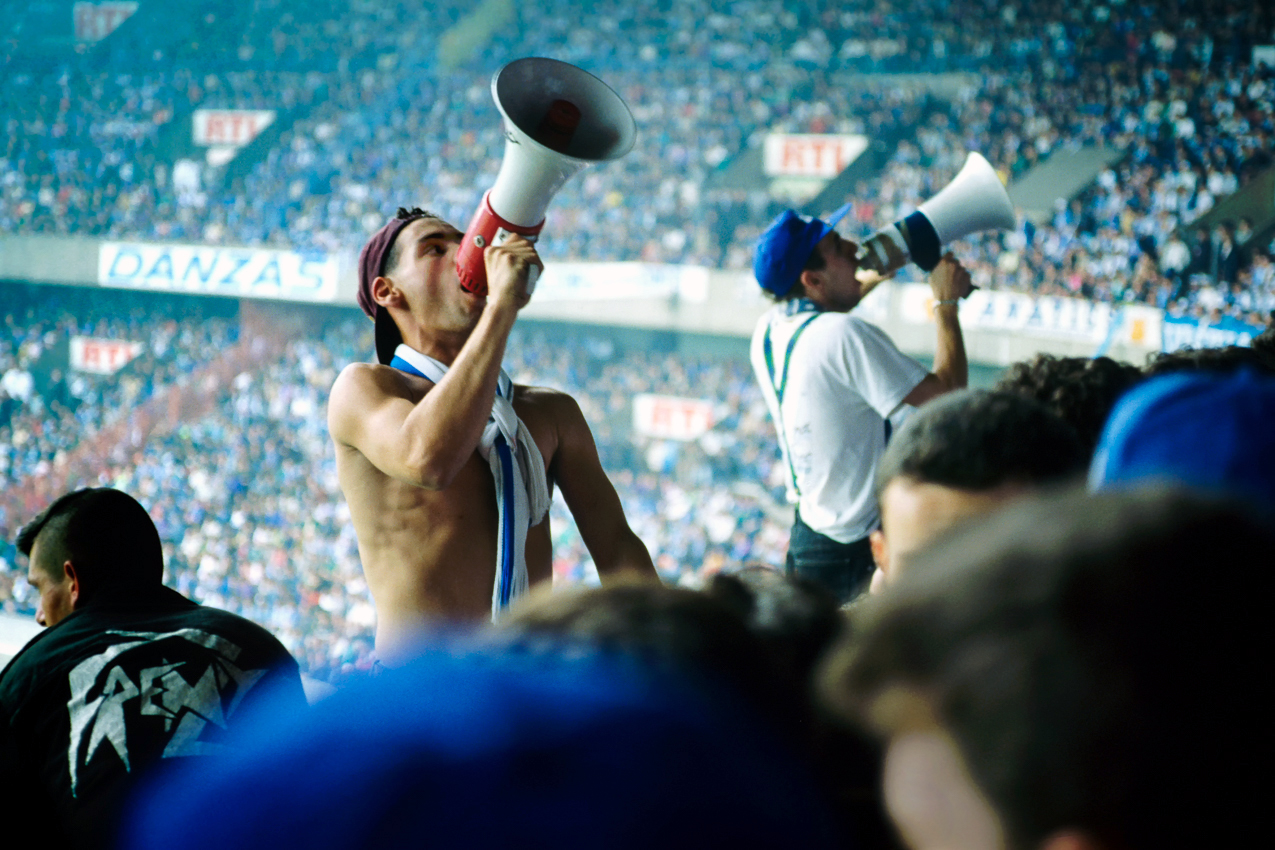
- Peretti (with the red megaphone) in 1991
- Born: Patrice Christian de Peretti; 11 March 1972; Marseille, France
- Died: 28 July 2000 (aged 28)

Patrice Christian de Peretti (11 March 1972 – 28 July 2000), nicknamed Depé, was a French association football supporter. A supporter of the football club Olympique de Marseille, he was dubbed as the "number one supporter" by Le Temps.

Peretti died from a coronary aneurysm on 28 July 2000, at the age of 28.

On 28 July 2020, the football club Olympique de Marseille released the short documentary film Virage Depé, published on YouTube. The documentary paid tribute to Depé.
