= Franciszek Adamczak =

Polish-Swedish palaeontologist (1927–2000)

Franciszek Adamczak (1 March 1927 – 16 July 2000) was a Polish–Swedish palaeontologist who made major contributions to the study of Palaeozoic ostracods.

== Biography ==
Born in Poland, Franciszek J. Adamczak studied geology at the University of Warsaw. He worked there for ten years, starting in 1954. In 1964 he emigrated to Sweden, took Swedish nationality, and worked at the Stockholm University; he also became a member of the Swedish Geological Society. At the end of life he participated in a project aiming at producing a new edition of the ostracod volume (Part Q) of the Treatise on Invertebrate Paleontology. As this project did not come to fruition, his papers were published posthumously by a collaborator, German ostracodologist Gerhard Becker.

== Research ==
=== Overview ===
Franciszek Adamczak worked on the morphology, systematics, and evolution of Palaeozoic ostracods. Among his discoveries, one may note the description of Eridostraca (= Eridostracina Adamczak, 1961), interpreted either as a primitive suborder of ostracods or as a different group of microcrustaceans. Franciszek Adamczak also described several ostracod genera, like Kuresaaria Adamczak, 1967 or Guerichiella Adamczak, 1968.

=== Selected publications ===
- Polyzygia Gürich, an ostracod genus from the Givetian of the Holy Cross Mountains (1956)
- Eridostraca, a new suborder of ostracods and its phylogenetic significance (1961)
- Palaeocopa and Platycopa Ostracoda from Middle Devonian rocks in the Holy Cross Mountains, Poland (1968)
- Middle Devonian Podocopida (Ostracoda) from Poland: their morphology, systematics and occurrence (1976)
- Contributions to Palaeozoic Ostracod Classification (posthumously, 2003–2006)

== Eponymy ==
The following ostracod genera are named in Franciszek Adamczak's honour:

- Adamczakiella Becker & Sanchez de Posada, 1977;
- Adamczakellus Groos-Uffenorde in Feist & Groos-Uffenorde, 1979;
- Adamczakia Schallreuter, 1986;
- Adamczakites Olempska, 1994.
