= Enrique de Gandía =

Argentine historian and author

Enrique de Gandía (February 1, 1906, in Buenos Aires – July 18, 2000) was an Argentine historian, author of over a hundred books.

He taught, as a professor of School of Fine Arts (1948), the University of Morón (1960) and the University of Belgrano (1967), being co-founder of the latter two. He also held the chair of Political Science at the Kennedy University (1991). In 1948 he was director of the Buenos Aires Municipal Museum (now the Historical Museum of Buenos Aires "Cornelio de Saavedra").

His career was recognized with the designation as a full member of the National Academies of History (1930), Moral and Political Sciences (1938 ), Geography (1985), and the National Academy of Sciences (1987). In 1933, he co-founded the National Institute of San Martin. In 1930, he co-founded the Paraguayan Institute of Historical Research, this institution and the Institute of History and Geography of Paraguay it would appoint an honorary member. He received numerous awards, including Konex 1984, the appointment of Government of Portugal as Commander of the Order of Prince Henry the Navigator (1991), honorary doctorates of the National University of Asuncion and University of the Basque Country.

He was considered by Paul Gallez, member and initiator of the Argentine School of Protocartography. He was the first to theorise that the fourth peninsula of Asia (called sometimes Cattigara Peninsula) in ancient maps was South America in his book Primitivos navegantes vascos.

== Publications ==
Partial list of the works published by Gandía:

- Historia del Gran Chaco - 1929
- Límites de las gobernaciones sudamericanas en el siglo XVI - 1933
- Los derechos del Paraguay sobre el Chaco Boreal en el siglo XVI - 1935
- Historia de la República Argentina en el Siglo XIX - 1940
- Historia de Cristóbal Colón - 1942
- Primitivos navegantes vascos - 1942
- Buenos Aires colonial - 1957
- Bolívar y la libertad - 1959
- Nicolás Avellaneda: Sus ideas y su tiempo - 1985
- Simón Bolívar: Su pensamiento político - 1984
- Historia de las ideas políticas en la Argentina - 1988
- Nueva historia de América, la libertad y la antilibertad - 1988
- Nueva historia del descubrimiento de América - 1987
- Américo Vespucci y sus cinco viajes al nuevo mundo - 1990

== See also ==
- Dick Edgar Ibarra Grasso
- Paul Gallez
- Basque sailors
- Pre-Columbian trans-oceanic contact
