= Dick Edgar Ibarra Grasso =

Argentine researcher (1914–2000)

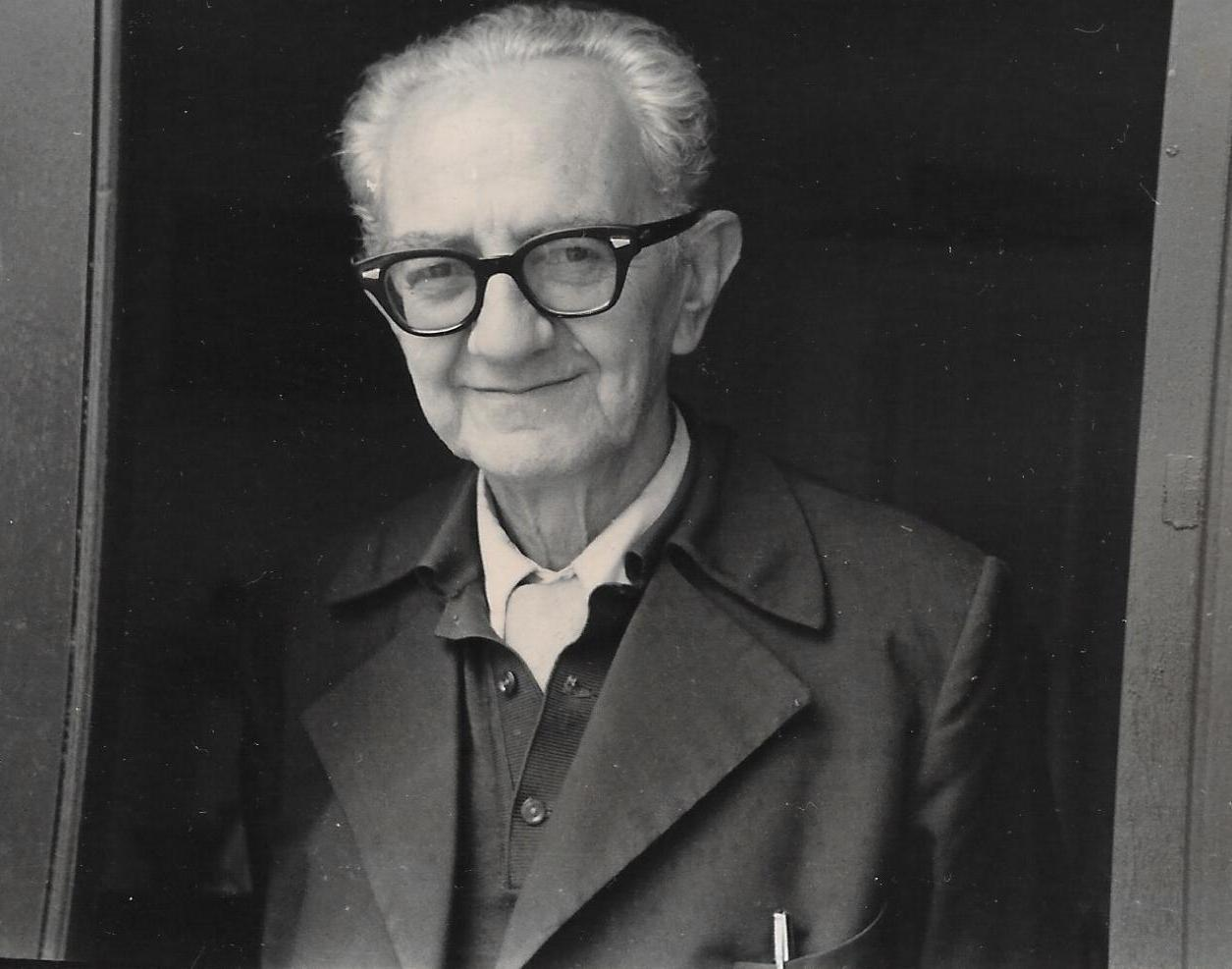
- Born: 17 January 1914; Concordia, Entre Rios, Argentina
- Died: 13 July 2000 (aged 86); Buenos Aires, Argentina
- Years active: 1940–2000

Dick Edgar Ibarra Grasso (17 January 1914 – 13 July 2000) was an Argentine researcher who explored the possibility of colonization of the Americas by several ancient ethnic groups.

He suggested that the coasts of Ecuador and Peru could be found in Ptolemy and Marinus of Tyre maps on the so-called Cattigara Peninsula. Ibarra Grasso based some of his assumptions on the suggestions made by Enrique de Gandía in the book "Primitivos navegantes vascos". He was considered by Paul Gallez, a member of the Argentine School of Protocartography.

He arrived in Bolivia in 1940. Ibarra Grasso's first destination was Potosí. At the age of 26, Ibarra Grasso came to Bolivia to look for the current existence of an Andean ideographic writing that he had seen mentioned in texts by Nordenskiold, Tschudi and Wiener.

In 1963, he created the School of Anthropology and Archaeology of the Universidad Mayor de San Simon, the first in Bolivia and the third in Latin America, with 18 students.

In the field work of the students of the School, abundant archaeological material was obtained (textiles, stone objects, ceramics), which notably increased the collection of the Museum of the UMSS. Ibarra and his students worked in Mizque, Aiquile, Omereque, Tiwanaku, Incarrakay and Incallajta.

Ibarra Grasso founded three archaeological museums:

- Casa de la Moneda de Potosí, 1940.
- San Francisco Xavier University Archaeological Museum, 1944.
- Archaeological Museum of the Universidad Mayor de San Simón, 1951.

The Universidad Mayor de San Simón awarded him the Doctorate Honoris Causa, and the Bolivian State the Condor of the Andes.

== Publications ==
- Historia de la navegación primitiva, Buenos Aires, Argentina, 1949.
- La escritura indígena andina, 1953.
- Tiahuanaco, 1956.
- Copacabana (in cooperation with Marks Portugal), 1957.
- Mapa arqueológico de Bolivia, 1962.
- Lenguas indígenas de Bolivia, 1964.
- Prehistoria de Bolivia, 1965.
- Introducción a la americanística, 1967.
- Argentina indígena y prehistoria americana, 1967.
- La verdadera historia de los incas, 1969.
- La representación de América en Mapas romanos de los tiempos de Cristo, Ediciones Ibarra Grasso, Buenos Aires, Argentina, 1970.
- América en la prehistoria mundial. DIFUSION GRECO FENICIA. Editor: TIPOGRAFICA EDITORA ARGENTINA, Bs. As., Argentina, 1982.
- Ciencias astronómica y sociología incaica, 1982.
- Sin Atlántida ni ovnis, 1984 (Arze 1987).
- Breve Historia de las Razas de América. Editorial Claridad, Buenos Aires. 1989.
- Los hombres Barbados en la América precolombina: razas indígenas americanas, Editorial Kier S.A., Buenos Aires, Argentina, 1997.
- "Novedades Sobre la Verdadera Historia de los Incas" Journal of Inter-American Studies 5(1) 1963: pp. 19–30, page 22, in Spanish
- Cosmogonía y Mitología Indígena Americana. Editorial Kier, 1997. página 65. ISBN 950-17-0064-X, 9789501700640

However, Ibarra Grasso's production was very extensive, being able to count 35 books on the previously mentioned topics.

== See also ==
- Pre-Columbian trans-oceanic contact
