= International Viola Society =

The International Viola Society, also called the "IVS" or "the Society," is an international organization dedicated to players of the viola. It is currently based in Dordrecht, the Netherlands, and sponsors annual International Viola Congresses. The purposes of the International Viola Society include promoting the standards of excellence in viola performance throughout the world, research relating to the history of the viola, influencing publishers to publish music, support the Primrose International Viola Archive, and many others.

The IVS was founded in 1968 by Franz Zeyringer as The Viola-Forschungsgellschaft. The IVS published the multi-language Viola Yearbook from 1979 to 1994. The IVS consists of several national sections around the world and also gives out many awards for excellence in areas relating to the viola.

The society currently has 21 Sections throughout the world in Australia/New Zealand, Brazil, Canada, China, Finland, France, Germany, Great Britain, Iceland, Italy, Netherlands, Nigeria, Poland, Portugal, South Africa, Spain, Switzerland, Thailand, Turkey and the United States.
